= 2024 Heilbronner Neckarcup – Singles =

Singles
- 2024 Heilbronner Neckarcup

Final
- Champion: (India) Sumit Nagal
- Runner-up: (Switzerland) Alexander Ritschard
- Score: 6–1, 6–7^{(5–7)}, 6–3

Events
Singles	Doubles
← 2023 ·	Heilbronner Neckarcup	· 2025 →

Matteo Arnaldi was the defending champion but chose not to defend his title.

Sumit Nagal won the title after defeating Alexander Ritschard 6–1, 6–7^{(5–7)}, 6–3 in the final.

== Seeds ==
1. (Germany) Daniel Altmaier (second round)
2. (Germany) Yannick Hanfmann (first round)
3. (India) Sumit Nagal (champion)
4. (Germany) Maximilian Marterer (second round)
5. (France) Luca Van Assche (semifinals)
6. (Colombia) Daniel Elahi Galán (first round)
7. (Spain) Albert Ramos Viñolas (first round)
8. (Austria) Jurij Rodionov (second round)

== Draw ==
=== Key ===
- Q = Qualifier
- WC = Wild card
- LL = Lucky loser
- Alt = Alternate
- ITF = ITF entry
- PR = Protected ranking
- SR = Special ranking
- SE = Special exempt
- JE = Junior exempt
- JR = Junior Accelerator Programme entrant
- CO = College Accelerator Programme entrant
- NG = Next Gen Accelerator Program entrant
- w/o = Walkover
- r = Retired
- d = Defaulted

=== Finals ===
Semifinals
5	(France) Luca Van Assche	2	6^{5}
3	(India) Sumit Nagal	6	7^{7}
(Switzerland) Alexander Ritschard	6	6^{7}	6
(United Kingdom) Jan Choinski	3	7^{9}	4

Final
3	(India) Sumit Nagal	6	6^{5}	6
(Switzerland) Alexander Ritschard	1	7^{7}	3

=== Top half ===
First round
1/WC	(Germany) D Altmaier	6	7^{7}
WC	(Germany) M Topo	3	6^{4}
(Poland) M Kaśnikowski	4	6	6
Alt	(Germany) S Fanselow	6	4	1
(France) G Blancaneaux	6	7^{9}
Q	(Germany) Lasse Pörtner	1	6^{7}
(France) M Janvier	7^{7}	3	6^{2}
5	(France) L Van Assche	6^{2}	6	7^{7}
3	(India) S Nagal	6	1	6
Q	(Georgia (country)) N Basilashvili	2	6	3
(Spain) J Barranco Cosano	6	6
Alt	(Denmark) A Holmgren	4	2
(Spain) N Sánchez Izquierdo	7^{8}	6
Q	(Brazil) D Dutra da Silva	6^{6}	2
I Gakhov	6	6
6	(Colombia) DE Galán	4	3

Second round
1/WC	(Germany) D Altmaier	2	5
(Poland) M Kaśnikowski	6	7
(France) G Blancaneaux	6	3	2
5	(France) L Van Assche	3	6	6
3	(India) S Nagal	6	6
(Spain) J Barranco Cosano	4	1
(Spain) N Sánchez Izquierdo	3	1
I Gakhov	6	6

Quarterfinals
(Poland) M Kaśnikowski	3	6	0
5	(France) L Van Assche	6	3	6
3	(India) S Nagal	6	7^{7}
I Gakhov	1	6^{4}

Semifinals
5	(France) L Van Assche	2	6^{5}
3	(India) S Nagal	6	7^{7}

=== Bottom half ===
First round
7	(Spain) A Ramos Viñolas	4	6^{2}
(Switzerland) A Ritschard	6	7^{7}
(Chile) T Barrios Vera	6	6
(Germany) B Hassan	4	0
(Germany) H Squire	6	6
(Paraguay) AD Vallejo	3	2
Q	(Germany) D Masur	3	0
4	(Germany) M Marterer	6	6
8	(Austria) J Rodionov	6	6^{3}	6
(France) M Martineau	3	7^{7}	2
Q	(United Kingdom) F Gill	4	5
(Spain) A Moro Cañas	6	7
Q	(Germany) Peter Heller	5	6	7
(Germany) R Molleker	7	4	5
(United Kingdom) J Choinski	6	6
2/WC	(Germany) Y Hanfmann	4	2

Second round
(Switzerland) A Ritschard	6	6
(Chile) T Barrios Vera	3	3
(Germany) H Squire	6	6
4	(Germany) M Marterer	0	2
8	(Austria) J Rodionov	6	6^{4}	6^{1}
(Spain) A Moro Cañas	3	7^{7}	7^{7}
Q	(Germany) P Heller	3	3
(United Kingdom) J Choinski	6	6

Quarterfinals
(Switzerland) A Ritschard	6	6
(Germany) H Squire	2	3
(Spain) A Moro Cañas	3	3
(United Kingdom) J Choinski	6	6

Semifinals
(Switzerland) A Ritschard	6	6^{7}	6
(United Kingdom) J Choinski	3	7^{9}	4
