= 2022 Heilbronner Neckarcup – Singles =

Singles
- 2022 Heilbronner Neckarcup

Final
- Champion: (Germany) Daniel Altmaier
- Runner-up: (Slovakia) Andrej Martin
- Score: 3–6, 6–1, 6–4

Events
| Singles | Doubles |
| ← 2021 · | Heilbronner Neckarcup | · 2023 → |

Bernabé Zapata Miralles was the defending champion but lost in the quarterfinals to Andrej Martin.

Daniel Altmaier won the title after defeating Martin 3–6, 6–1, 6–4 in the final.

== Seeds ==
1. (Germany) Daniel Altmaier (champion)
2. (Argentina) Facundo Bagnis (second round)
3. (Colombia) Daniel Elahi Galán (semifinals)
4. (Spain) Bernabé Zapata Miralles (quarterfinals)
5. (Chinese Taipei) Tseng Chun-hsin (quarterfinals)
6. (Moldova) Radu Albot (first round)
7. (Switzerland) Marc-Andrea Hüsler (first round)
8. (Slovakia) Andrej Martin (final)

== Draw ==
=== Key ===
- Q = Qualifier
- WC = Wild card
- LL = Lucky loser
- Alt = Alternate
- SE = Special exempt
- PR = Protected ranking
- ITF = ITF entry
- JE = Junior exempt
- w/o = Walkover
- r = Retired
- d = Defaulted
- SR = Special ranking

=== Finals ===
Semifinals
1 | (Germany) Daniel Altmaier | 6 | 2 | 6
3 | (Colombia) Daniel Elahi Galán | 3 | 6 | 4
8 | (Slovakia) Andrej Martin | 2 | 7^{7} | 0
Q | (Czech Republic) Jonáš Forejtek | 6 | 6^{4} | 1^{r}

Final
1 | (Germany) Daniel Altmaier | 3 | 6 | 6
8 | (Slovakia) Andrej Martin | 6 | 1 | 4

=== Top half ===
First round
1 | (Germany) D Altmaier | 6 | 6
(Argentina) F Mena | 2 | 3
(Argentina) P Cachin | 3 | 6 | 1
(France) C Lestienne | 6 | 1 | 6
WC | (Germany) MH Rehberg | 6 | 4 | 4
(Argentina) TA Tirante | 3 | 6 | 6
(Argentina) C Ugo Carabelli | 3 | 6 | 7^{9}
7 | (Switzerland) M-A Hüsler | 6 | 3 | 6^{7}
3 | (Colombia) DE Galán | 6 | 6
Alt | (Netherlands) J Sels | 3 | 4
(Switzerland) D Stricker | 6^{4} | 0^{r}
Q | (Lebanon) B Hassan | 7^{7} | 2
(Belgium) Z Bergs | 6^{4} | 6 | 4
Q | (Germany) H Squire | 7^{7} | 4 | 6
(United States) E Escobedo | 2 | 3
5 | (Chinese Taipei) C-h Tseng | 6 | 6

Second round
1 | (Germany) D Altmaier | 6 | 6
(France) C Lestienne | 1 | 4
(Argentina) TA Tirante | 6 | 6
(Argentina) C Ugo Carabelli | 2 | 1
3 | (Colombia) DE Galán | 6 | 4 | 6
Q | (Lebanon) B Hassan | 2 | 6 | 2
Q | (Germany) H Squire | 1 | 2
5 | (Chinese Taipei) C-h Tseng | 6 | 6

Quarterfinals
1 | (Germany) D Altmaier | 6 | 6
(Argentina) TA Tirante | 3 | 2
3 | (Colombia) DE Galán | 5 | 6 | 6
5 | (Chinese Taipei) C-h Tseng | 7 | 3 | 4

Semifinals
1 | (Germany) D Altmaier | 6 | 2 | 6
3 | (Colombia) DE Galán | 3 | 6 | 4

=== Bottom half ===
First round
8 | (Slovakia) A Martin | 6 | 7
E Gerasimov | 4 | 5
Q | (Ukraine) O Krutykh | 6 | 6
(France) G Simon | 2 | 1
Q | (Germany) R Molleker | 6 | 4 | 6
Alt | (Germany) N Kuhn | 4 | 6 | 4
WC | (Romania) M Copil | 7^{7} | 4 | 4
4/WC | (Spain) B Zapata Miralles | 6^{5} | 6 | 6
6 | (Moldova) R Albot | 3 | 3
Alt | (Switzerland) A Ritschard | 6 | 6
LL | (Serbia) M Zekić | 3 | 5
Q | (India) S Nagal | 6 | 1^{r}
(United States) B Fratangelo | 1 | 7^{7} | 6^{4}
Q | (Czech Republic) J Forejtek | 6 | 6^{5} | 7^{7}
(United States) M Krueger | 2 | 4
2 | (Argentina) F Bagnis | 6 | 6

Second round
8 | (Slovakia) A Martin | 6 | 6
Q | (Ukraine) O Krutykh | 3 | 4
Q | (Germany) R Molleker | 4 | 4
4/WC | (Spain) B Zapata Miralles | 6 | 6
Alt | (Switzerland) A Ritschard | 6 | 6
LL | (Serbia) M Zekić | 1 | 1
Q | (Czech Republic) J Forejtek | 7^{10} | 2 | 6
2 | (Argentina) F Bagnis | 6^{8} | 6 | 3

Quarterfinals
8 | (Slovakia) A Martin | 7 | 6
4/WC | (Spain) B Zapata Miralles | 5 | 2
Alt | (Switzerland) A Ritschard | 7 | 3 | 3
Q | (Czech Republic) J Forejtek | 5 | 6 | 6

Semifinals
8 | (Slovakia) A Martin | 2 | 7^{7} | 0
Q | (Czech Republic) J Forejtek | 6 | 6^{4} | 1^{r}
