= 2024 Heilbronner Neckarcup – Doubles =

Doubles
- 2024 Heilbronner Neckarcup

Final
- Champions: (Monaco) Romain Arneodo (France) Geoffrey Blancaneaux
- Runners-up: (Germany) Jakob Schnaitter (Germany) Mark Wallner
- Score: 7–6^{(7–5)}, 5–7, [10–3]

Events
Singles	Doubles
← 2023 ·	Heilbronner Neckarcup	· 2025 →

Constantin Frantzen and Hendrik Jebens were the defending champions but lost in the semifinals to Jakob Schnaitter and Mark Wallner.

Romain Arneodo and Geoffrey Blancaneaux won the title after defeating Schnaitter and Wallner 7–6^{(7–5)}, 5–7, [10–3] in the final.

== Seeds ==
1. (Germany) Constantin Frantzen / (Germany) Hendrik Jebens (semifinals)
2. (France) Théo Arribagé / (Romania) Victor Vlad Cornea (first round)
3. (Bolivia) Boris Arias / (Bolivia) Federico Zeballos (quarterfinals)
4. (Venezuela) Luis David Martínez / (Colombia) Cristian Rodríguez (semifinals)

== Draw ==
=== Key ===
- Q = Qualifier
- WC = Wild card
- LL = Lucky loser
- Alt = Alternate
- SE = Special exempt
- PR = Protected ranking
- ITF = ITF entry
- JE = Junior exempt
- w/o = Walkover
- r = Retired
- d = Defaulted
- SR = Special ranking

=== Draw ===
First round
1	(Germany) C Frantzen (Germany) H Jebens	6	6
(Spain) J Barranco Cosano (Spain) N Sánchez Izquierdo	4	3
WC	(Germany) J Engel (Germany) D Masur	2	6^{4}
(Sweden) F Bergevi (Netherlands) M Veldheer	6	7^{7}
3	(Bolivia) B Arias (Bolivia) F Zeballos	6	6
(Belgium) M Geerts (Spain) A Moro Cañas	4	4
(Germany) B Hassan (Germany) R Molleker	3	7	[4]
(Germany) J Schnaitter (Germany) M Wallner	6	5	[10]
WC	(Germany) S Fanselow (Germany) Lucas Gerch	4	6	[1]
(Italy) G Ricca (Italy) Augusto Virgili	6	4	[10]
(Japan) T Matsui (Japan) K Uesugi	3	3
4	(Venezuela) LD Martínez (Colombia) C Rodríguez	6	6
(Australia) T Fancutt (France) M Janvier	6	2	[4]
(Monaco) R Arneodo (France) G Blancaneaux	2	6	[10]
(United States) C Harrison (France) F Martin	2	7^{7}	[10]
2	(France) T Arribagé (Romania) V Cornea	6	6^{4}	[7]

Quarterfinals
1	(Germany) C Frantzen (Germany) H Jebens	3	7^{7}	[10]
(Sweden) F Bergevi (Netherlands) M Veldheer	6	6^{4}	[5]
3	(Bolivia) B Arias (Bolivia) F Zeballos	3	5
(Germany) J Schnaitter (Germany) M Wallner	6	7
(Italy) G Ricca (Italy) A Virgili	4	4
4	(Venezuela) LD Martínez (Colombia) C Rodríguez	6	6
(Monaco) R Arneodo (France) G Blancaneaux	6	6
(United States) C Harrison (France) F Martin	4	4

Semifinals
1	(Germany) C Frantzen (Germany) H Jebens	6^{4}	3
(Germany) J Schnaitter (Germany) M Wallner	7^{7}	6
4	(Venezuela) LD Martínez (Colombia) C Rodríguez	1	2
(Monaco) R Arneodo (France) G Blancaneaux	6	6

Final
(Germany) J Schnaitter (Germany) M Wallner	6^{5}	7	[3]
(Monaco) R Arneodo (France) G Blancaneaux	7^{7}	5	[10]
