= 2021 Heilbronner Neckarcup – Singles =

Singles
- 2021 Heilbronner Neckarcup

Final
- Champion: (Spain) Bernabé Zapata Miralles
- Runner-up: (Colombia) Daniel Elahi Galán
- Score: 6–3, 6–4

Events
Singles	Doubles
← 2019 ·	Heilbronner Neckarcup	· 2022 →

Filip Krajinović was the defending champion but chose not to defend his title.

Bernabé Zapata Miralles won the title after defeating Daniel Elahi Galán 6–3, 6–4 in the final.

== Seeds ==
1. (Czech Republic) Jiří Veselý (first round)
2. (Germany) Yannick Hanfmann (second round)
3. (Austria) Dennis Novak (semifinals)
4. (Colombia) Daniel Elahi Galán (final)
5. (Japan) Taro Daniel (quarterfinals)
6. (United States) Denis Kudla (first round)
7. (Germany) Philipp Kohlschreiber (quarterfinals)
8. (United States) Mackenzie McDonald (semifinals)

== Draw ==
=== Key ===
- Q = Qualifier
- WC = Wild card
- LL = Lucky loser
- Alt = Alternate
- SE = Special exempt
- PR = Protected ranking
- ITF = ITF entry
- JE = Junior exempt
- w/o = Walkover
- r = Retired
- d = Defaulted
- SR = Special ranking

=== Finals ===
Semifinals
(Spain) Bernabé Zapata Miralles	6	1	6
3	(Austria) Dennis Novak	3	6	3
4	(Colombia) Daniel Elahi Galán	6	6^{4}	7
8	(United States) Mackenzie McDonald	4	7^{7}	5

Final
(Spain) Bernabé Zapata Miralles	6	6
4	(Colombia) Daniel Elahi Galán	3	4

=== Top half ===
First round
1	(Czech Republic) J Veselý	6^{2}	6^{3}
(Germany) O Otte	7^{7}	7^{7}
(Ukraine) I Marchenko	3	6^{2}
(Spain) B Zapata Miralles	6	7^{7}
WC	(Germany) R Molleker	0	6	3
(France) A Hoang	6	3	6
(India) S Nagal	7	1	6
6	(United States) D Kudla	5	6	1
3	(Austria) D Novak	6	2	7
WC	(Germany) Y Maden	2	6	5
Q	(Germany) M Moraing	7^{7}	6
(Switzerland) H Laaksonen	6^{2}	2
LL	(Argentina) TM Etcheverry	6	6
PR	(Russia) A Kuznetsov	3	2
(Germany) D Altmaier	5	0
5	(Japan) T Daniel	7	6

Second round
(Germany) O Otte	2	1
(Spain) B Zapata Miralles	6	6
(France) A Hoang	6	1	4
(India) S Nagal	1	6	6
3	(Austria) D Novak	7^{7}	4	7
Q	(Germany) M Moraing	6^{4}	6	5
LL	(Argentina) TM Etcheverry	4	1
5	(Japan) T Daniel	6	6

Quarterfinals
(Spain) B Zapata Miralles	6	6
(India) S Nagal	3	1
3	(Austria) D Novak	6	6
5	(Japan) T Daniel	4	4

Semifinals
(Spain) B Zapata Miralles	6	1	6
3	(Austria) D Novak	3	6	3

=== Bottom half ===
First round
7	(Germany) P Kohlschreiber	6	6
Q	(France) M Janvier	4	3
(Switzerland) M-A Hüsler	7^{7}	4	6^{3}
(United States) B Nakashima	6^{3}	6	7^{7}
Alt	(Italy) A Giannessi	7^{7}	6
(India) P Gunneswaran	6^{4}	1
(Australia) M Polmans	1	1
4	(Colombia) DE Galán	6	6
8	(United States) M McDonald	6	4
Q	(Australia) A Vukic	3	3^{r}
Alt	(Belgium) K Coppejans	6	6
(Spain) C Taberner	2	1
Q	(Turkey) E Kırkın	6^{6}	6	5
LL	(Brazil) J Menezes	7^{8}	2	7
(Netherlands) T Griekspoor	0	4
2/WC	(Germany) Y Hanfmann	6	6

Second round
7	(Germany) P Kohlschreiber	3	6	6
(United States) B Nakashima	6	4	1
Alt	(Italy) A Giannessi	7^{7}	6^{7}	4
4	(Colombia) DE Galán	6^{4}	7^{9}	6
8	(United States) M McDonald	6	4	6
Alt	(Belgium) K Coppejans	4	6	3
LL	(Brazil) J Menezes	6	6
2/WC	(Germany) Y Hanfmann	4	3

Quarterfinals
7	(Germany) P Kohlschreiber	6	2	6^{4}
4	(Colombia) DE Galán	2	6	7^{7}
8	(United States) M McDonald	6	6
LL	(Brazil) J Menezes	3	3

Semifinals
4	(Colombia) DE Galán	6	6^{4}	7
8	(United States) M McDonald	4	7^{7}	5
