= 2019 Heilbronner Neckarcup – Singles =

Professional tennis tournament

Singles
- 2019 Heilbronner Neckarcup

Final
- Champion: (Serbia) Filip Krajinović
- Runner-up: (Belgium) Arthur De Greef
- Score: 6–3, 6–1

Events
Singles	Doubles
← 2018 ·	Heilbronner Neckarcup	· 2021 →

Rudolf Molleker was the defending champion but lost in the quarterfinals to Dennis Novak.

Filip Krajinović won the title after defeating Arthur De Greef 6–3, 6–1 in the final.

== Seeds ==
All seeds receive a bye into the second round.

1. (Serbia) Filip Krajinović (champion)
2. (United States) Tennys Sandgren (second round)
3. (Kazakhstan) Alexander Bublik (second round)
4. (Czech Republic) Jiří Veselý (third round)
5. (Uzbekistan) Denis Istomin (second round)
6. (Bolivia) Hugo Dellien (quarterfinals)
7. (Brazil) Thiago Monteiro (third round)
8. (Germany) Maximilian Marterer (withdrew)
9. (Sweden) Elias Ymer (third round)
10. (Germany) Yannick Maden (second round)
11. (Austria) Dennis Novak (semifinals)
12. (Spain) Guillermo García López (third round)
13. (Italy) Stefano Travaglia (semifinals)
14. (Canada) Peter Polansky (third round)
15. (Austria) Sebastian Ofner (second round)
16. (Germany) Matthias Bachinger (quarterfinals)

== Draw ==
=== Key ===
- Q = Qualifier
- WC = Wild card
- LL = Lucky loser
- Alt = Alternate
- SE = Special exempt
- PR = Protected ranking
- ITF = ITF entry
- JE = Junior exempt
- w/o = Walkover
- r = Retired
- d = Defaulted
- SR = Special ranking

=== Finals ===
Quarterfinals
1/WC	(Serbia) Filip Krajinović	7	7^{8}
LL	(Serbia) Viktor Troicki	5	6^{6}
13	(Italy) Stefano Travaglia	6	3	7
6	(Bolivia) Hugo Dellien	4	6	5
(Belgium) Arthur De Greef	3	6	6
16	(Germany) Matthias Bachinger	6	1	2
11	(Austria) Dennis Novak	1	7	7^{7}
(Germany) Rudolf Molleker	6	5	6^{3}

Semifinals
1/WC	(Serbia) Filip Krajinović	1	7^{7}	6
13	(Italy) Stefano Travaglia	6	6^{5}	1
(Belgium) Arthur De Greef	6	7
11	(Austria) Dennis Novak	3	5

Final
1/WC	(Serbia) Filip Krajinović	6	6
(Belgium) Arthur De Greef	3	1

=== Top half ===
==== Section 1 ====
First round
(Germany) D Köpfer	6	6
(Germany) D Brands	3	1
ITF	(France) Baptiste Crepatte	6	7^{7}
(Brazil) R Dutra Silva	3	6^{2}
WC	(Germany) D Altmaier	6	6
(Austria) J Rodionov	4	2
(Argentina) C Berlocq	3	1
(Russia) A Vatutin	6	6

Second round
1/WC	(Serbia) F Krajinović	6	4	7
(Germany) D Köpfer	4	6	5
ITF	(France) B Crepatte	1	6^{4}
14	(Canada) P Polansky	6	7^{7}
12	(Spain) G García López	6	6
WC	(Germany) D Altmaier	3	3
(Russia) A Vatutin	6	1	6^{6}
LL	(Serbia) V Troicki	2	6	7^{8}

Third round
1/WC	(Serbia) F Krajinović	6	7
14	(Canada) P Polansky	3	5
12	(Spain) G García López	4	4
LL	(Serbia) V Troicki	6	6

Quarterfinals
1/WC	(Serbia) F Krajinović	7	7^{8}
LL	(Serbia) V Troicki	5	6^{6}

==== Section 2 ====
First round
(Japan) Yo Watanuki	2	2
(Slovakia) J Kovalík	6	6
WC	(Germany) C-M Stebe	4	3
(Germany) D Brown	6	6
ITF	(France) A Rinderknech	6	3	2
ITF	(Argentina) H Casanova	3	6	6
(Italy) M Viola	4	3
Q	(Hungary) A Balázs	6	6

Second round
3	(Kazakhstan) A Bublik	6^{2}	0
(Slovakia) J Kovalík	7^{7}	6
(Germany) D Brown	1	4
13	(Italy) S Travaglia	6	6
9/WC	(Sweden) E Ymer	6	6
ITF	(Argentina) H Casanova	3	0
Q	(Hungary) A Balázs	6	2	3
6	(Bolivia) H Dellien	4	6	6

Third round
(Slovakia) J Kovalík	6	3	6^{1}
13	(Italy) S Travaglia	1	6	7^{7}
9/WC	(Sweden) E Ymer	2	2
6	(Bolivia) H Dellien	6	6

Quarterfinals
13	(Italy) S Travaglia	6	3	7
6	(Bolivia) H Dellien	4	6	5

=== Bottom half ===
==== Section 3 ====
First round
(Colombia) DE Galán	7	6^{5}	3
(France) C Lestienne	5	7^{7}	6
(Belgium) A De Greef	6	6
(United States) N Rubin	2	2
ITF	(Germany) Peter Heller	6	6
LL	(Germany) K Krawietz	3	2
Q	(Germany) D Masur	6	4	6
(Germany) Y Hanfmann	3	6	2

Second round
7	(Brazil) T Monteiro	6	7
(France) C Lestienne	4	5
(Belgium) A De Greef	6	6
10/WC	(Germany) Y Maden	4	2
16	(Germany) M Bachinger	6	6
ITF	(Germany) P Heller	3	3
Q	(Germany) D Masur	5	4
4	(Czech Republic) J Veselý	7	6

Third round
7	(Brazil) T Monteiro	6^{7}	6	6^{3}
(Belgium) A De Greef	7^{9}	2	7^{7}
16	(Germany) M Bachinger	6	6
4	(Czech Republic) J Veselý	4	4

Quarterfinals
(Belgium) A De Greef	3	6	6
16	(Germany) M Bachinger	6	1	2

==== Section 4 ====
First round
(Germany) O Otte	6	6
(Czech Republic) L Rosol	4	1
(Argentina) M Trungelliti	7^{7}	6
(Italy) S Napolitano	6^{5}	4
(Bosnia and Herzegovina) M Bašić	4	2
ITF	(Russia) A Karatsev	6	6
(Germany) R Molleker	5	6	6
(Germany) M Moraing	7	4	1

Second round
5	(Uzbekistan) D Istomin	2	2
(Germany) O Otte	6	6
(Argentina) M Trungelliti	6^{3}	2
11	(Austria) D Novak	7^{7}	6
15	(Austria) S Ofner	4	6	6^{1}
ITF	(Russia) A Karatsev	6	2	7^{7}
(Germany) R Molleker	6	6
2	(United States) T Sandgren	3	4

Third round
(Germany) O Otte	5	2
11	(Austria) D Novak	7	6
ITF	(Russia) A Karatsev	5	3
(Germany) R Molleker	7	6

Quarterfinals
11	(Austria) D Novak	1	7	7^{7}
(Germany) R Molleker	6	5	6^{3}
