= 2022 Heilbronner Neckarcup =

- Date: 9–14 May
- Edition: 8th
- Surface: Clay
- Location: Heilbronn, Germany

Champions

Singles
- (Germany) Daniel Altmaier

Doubles
- (Colombia) Nicolás Barrientos / (Mexico) Miguel Ángel Reyes-Varela
← 2021 ·	Heilbronner Neckarcup	· 2023 →

The 2022 Heilbronner Neckarcup was a professional tennis tournament played on clay courts. It was the eighth edition of the tournament which was part of the 2022 ATP Challenger Tour. It took place in Heilbronn, Germany between 9 and 14 May 2022.

== Champions ==
=== Singles ===
- (Germany) Daniel Altmaier def. (Slovakia) Andrej Martin 3–6, 6–1, 6–4.

=== Doubles ===
- (Colombia) Nicolás Barrientos / (Mexico) Miguel Ángel Reyes-Varela def. (Netherlands) Jelle Sels / (Netherlands) Bart Stevens 7–5, 6–3.

== Singles main-draw entrants ==
=== Seeds ===
Country	Player	Rank^{1}	Seed
GER	Daniel Altmaier	65	1
ARG	Facundo Bagnis	97	2
COL	Daniel Elahi Galán	109	3
ESP	Bernabé Zapata Miralles	113	4
TPE	Tseng Chun-hsin	118	5
MDA	Radu Albot	120	6
SUI	Marc-Andrea Hüsler	125	7
SVK	Andrej Martin	135	8

- ^{1} Rankings are as of 2 May 2022.

=== Other entrants ===
The following players received wildcards into the singles main draw:

- (Romania) Marius Copil
- (Germany) Max Hans Rehberg
- (Spain) Bernabé Zapata Miralles

The following players received entry into the singles main draw as alternates:

- (Germany) Nicola Kuhn
- (Switzerland) Alexander Ritschard
- (Netherlands) Jelle Sels

The following players received entry from the qualifying draw:

- (Czech Republic) Jonáš Forejtek
- (Lebanon) Benjamin Hassan
- (Ukraine) Oleksii Krutykh
- (Germany) Rudolf Molleker
- (India) Sumit Nagal
- (Germany) Henri Squire

The following player received entry as a lucky loser:

- (Serbia) Miljan Zekić
