= 2026 Neckarcup 2.0 – Doubles =

Doubles
- 2026 Neckarcup 2.0

Final
- Champions: (Chinese Taipei) Jason Jung (Japan) Kaito Uesugi
- Runners-up: (Germany) Tim Rühl (Netherlands) Mick Veldheer
- Score: 7–6^{(7–4)}, 2–6, [12–10]

Events
Singles	Doubles
- Neckarcup 2.0

Vasil Kirkov and Bart Stevens were the defending champions but chose not to defend their title.

Jason Jung and Kaito Uesugi won the title after defeating Tim Rühl and Mick Veldheer 7–6^{(7–4)}, 2–6, [12–10] in the final.

== Seeds ==
1. (Australia) Blake Bayldon / (Australia) Marc Polmans (first round)
2. (United States) George Goldhoff / (Canada) Cleeve Harper (quarterfinals)
3. (Croatia) Nino Serdarušić / (Czech Republic) Michael Vrbenský (quarterfinals)
4. (Israel) Daniel Cukierman / (Argentina) Mariano Kestelboim (first round)

== Draw ==
Key

- Q = Qualifier
- WC = Wild card
- LL = Lucky loser
- Alt = Alternate
- ITF = ITF entry
- PR = Protected ranking
- SR = Special ranking
- SE = Special exempt
- JE = Junior exempt
- JR = Junior Accelerator Programme entrant
- CO = College Accelerator Programme entrant
- NG = Next Gen Accelerator Program entrant
- w/o = Walkover
- r = Retired
- d = Defaulted

First round
1	(Australia) B Bayldon (Australia) M Polmans	2	3
(Germany) T Rühl (Netherlands) M Veldheer	6	6
WC	(Germany) H Squire (Germany) M Wiskandt	6	3	[13]
(Spain) B Pujol Navarro (Spain) D Vega Hernández	1	6	[11]
4	(Israel) D Cukierman (Argentina) M Kestelboim	4	4
(Sweden) E Grevelius (Sweden) A Heinonen	6	6
(Colombia) DE Galán (Brazil) JL Reis da Silva	6^{6}	4
(Croatia) M Dodig (Croatia) L Mikrut	7^{8}	6
(Chinese Taipei) J Jung (Japan) K Uesugi	7^{7}	6
Alt	(Spain) P Martínez (Netherlands) M Vervoort	6^{2}	1
WC	(Germany) T Handel (Germany) Lasse Pörtner	2	4
3	(Croatia) N Serdarušić (Czech Republic) M Vrbenský	6	6
(Venezuela) Juan José Bianchi (Bulgaria) A Genov	4	5
(Argentina) A Barrena (United States) E Nava	6	7
(Romania) V Cornea (Morocco) Y Lalami	6^{5}	6^{5}
2	(United States) G Goldhoff (Canada) C Harper	7^{7}	7^{7}

Quarterfinals
(Germany) T Rühl (Netherlands) M Veldheer	3	7^{7}	[10]
WC	(Germany) H Squire (Germany) M Wiskandt	6	6^{4}	[5]
(Sweden) E Grevelius (Sweden) A Heinonen	7	6^{5}	[4]
(Croatia) M Dodig (Croatia) L Mikrut	5	7^{7}	[10]
(Chinese Taipei) J Jung (Japan) K Uesugi	6	7^{7}
3	(Croatia) N Serdarušić (Czech Republic) M Vrbenský	2	6^{4}
(Argentina) A Barrena (United States) E Nava	6	6^{1}	[10]
2	(United States) G Goldhoff (Canada) C Harper	3	7^{7}	[6]

Semifinals
(Germany) T Rühl (Netherlands) M Veldheer	6	3	[10]
(Croatia) M Dodig (Croatia) L Mikrut	4	6	[8]
(Chinese Taipei) J Jung (Japan) K Uesugi	6	6
(Argentina) A Barrena (United States) E Nava	2	2

Final
(Germany) T Rühl (Netherlands) M Veldheer	6^{4}	6	[10]
(Chinese Taipei) J Jung (Japan) K Uesugi	7^{7}	2	[12]
