= 2019 Heilbronner Neckarcup – Doubles =

Doubles
- 2019 Heilbronner Neckarcup

Final
- Champions: (Germany) Kevin Krawietz (Germany) Andreas Mies
- Runners-up: (Germany) Andre Begemann (France) Fabrice Martin
- Score: 6–2, 6–4

Events
Singles	Doubles
← 2018 ·	Heilbronner Neckarcup	· 2021 →

Rameez Junaid and David Pel were the defending champions, but only Junaid chose to defend his title, partnering Jozef Kovalík. Junaid lost in the quarterfinals to Andre Begemann and Fabrice Martin.

Kevin Krawietz and Andreas Mies won the title after defeating Begemann and Martin 6–2, 6–4 in the final.

Just three weeks later, Krawietz and Mies would defeat Martin and Jérémy Chardy in the final of the French Open to win their first Grand Slam title.

== Seeds ==
1. (Germany) Kevin Krawietz / (Germany) Andreas Mies (champions)
2. (Czech Republic) Roman Jebavý / (Argentina) Andrés Molteni (first round)
3. (Sweden) Robert Lindstedt / (Pakistan) Aisam-ul-Haq Qureshi (quarterfinals)
4. (Ukraine) Denys Molchanov / (Slovakia) Igor Zelenay (first round)

== Draw ==
=== Key ===
- Q = Qualifier
- WC = Wild card
- LL = Lucky loser
- Alt = Alternate
- SE = Special exempt
- PR = Protected ranking
- ITF = ITF entry
- JE = Junior exempt
- w/o = Walkover
- r = Retired
- d = Defaulted
- SR = Special ranking

First round
1	(Germany) K Krawietz (Germany) A Mies	6	6
WC	(Germany) D Brown (Serbia) N Zimonjić	4	3
WC	(Germany) D Altmaier (Germany) R Molleker	7^{7}	4	[10]
(Uzbekistan) D Istomin (Canada) P Polansky	6^{2}	6	[8]
3	(Sweden) R Lindstedt (Pakistan) A-u-H Qureshi	6	6
ITF	(Germany) Peter Heller (Russia) A Karatsev	4	4
WC	(Turkey) T Altuna (India) VS Prashanth	6	3	[5]
(Argentina) C Berlocq (Bolivia) H Dellien	4	6	[10]
(Mexico) H Hach Verdugo (Mexico) MÁ Reyes-Varela	0	4
(Germany) A Begemann (France) F Martin	6	6
(Australia) R Junaid (Slovakia) J Kovalík	6	3	[10]
4	(Ukraine) D Molchanov (Slovakia) I Zelenay	4	6	[3]
(Monaco) R Arneodo (Spain) G García López	7	6
(Belgium) S Gillé (Belgium) J Vliegen	5	4
ITF	(Zimbabwe) B Lock (Zimbabwe) CJ Lock	6	2	[10]
2	(Czech Republic) R Jebavý (Argentina) A Molteni	4	6	[5]

Quarterfinals
1	(Germany) K Krawietz (Germany) A Mies	6	6
WC	(Germany) D Altmaier (Germany) R Molleker	2	4
3	(Sweden) R Lindstedt (Pakistan) A-u-H Qureshi	4	3
(Argentina) C Berlocq (Bolivia) H Dellien	6	6
(Germany) A Begemann (France) F Martin	6	6
(Australia) R Junaid (Slovakia) J Kovalík	2	2
(Monaco) R Arneodo (Spain) G García López	6	6
ITF	(Zimbabwe) B Lock (Zimbabwe) CJ Lock	4	4

Semifinals
1	(Germany) K Krawietz (Germany) A Mies	w/o
(Argentina) C Berlocq (Bolivia) H Dellien
(Germany) A Begemann (France) F Martin	4	6	[11]
(Monaco) R Arneodo (Spain) G García López	6	3	[9]

Final
1	(Germany) K Krawietz (Germany) A Mies	6	6
(Germany) A Begemann (France) F Martin	2	4
