= 2021 Heilbronner Neckarcup =

- Date: 10–16 May
- Edition: 7th
- Draw: 32S / 16D
- Surface: Clay
- Location: Heilbronn, Germany

Champions

Singles
- (Spain) Bernabé Zapata Miralles

Doubles
- (United States) Nathaniel Lammons / (United States) Jackson Withrow
← 2019 ·	Heilbronner Neckarcup	· 2022 →

The 2021 Heilbronner Neckarcup was a professional tennis tournament played on clay courts. It was the seventh edition of the tournament which was part of the 2021 ATP Challenger Tour. It took place in Heilbronn, Germany between 10 and 16 May 2021.

== Champions ==
=== Singles ===
- (Spain) Bernabé Zapata Miralles def. (Colombia) Daniel Elahi Galán 6–3, 6–4.

=== Doubles ===
- (United States) Nathaniel Lammons / (United States) Jackson Withrow def. (Sweden) André Göransson / (Netherlands) Sem Verbeek 6–7^{(4–7)}, 6–4, [10–8].

== Singles main-draw entrants ==
=== Seeds ===
Country	Player	Rank^{1}	Seed
CZE	Jiří Veselý	72	1
GER	Yannick Hanfmann	96	2
AUT	Dennis Novak	111	3
COL	Daniel Elahi Galán	112	4
JPN	Taro Daniel	114	5
USA	Denis Kudla	117	6
GER	Philipp Kohlschreiber	119	7
USA	Mackenzie McDonald	121	8

- ^{1} Rankings are as of 3 May 2021.

=== Other entrants ===
The following players received wildcards into the singles main draw:

- (Germany) Yannick Hanfmann
- (Germany) Yannick Maden
- (Germany) Rudolf Molleker

The following player received entry into the singles main draw using a protected ranking:

- (Russia) Andrey Kuznetsov

The following players received entry into the singles main draw as alternates:

- (Belgium) Kimmer Coppejans
- (Italy) Alessandro Giannessi

The following players received entry from the qualifying draw:

- (France) Maxime Janvier
- (Turkey) Ergi Kırkın
- (Germany) Mats Moraing
- (Australia) Aleksandar Vukic

The following players received entry as lucky losers:

- (Argentina) Tomás Martín Etcheverry
- (Brazil) João Menezes
