= 2026 Neckarcup 2.0 – Singles =

Singles
- 2026 Neckarcup 2.0

Final
- Champion: (United States) Emilio Nava
- Runner-up: (Croatia) Luka Mikrut
- Score: Walkover

Events
Singles	Doubles
- Neckarcup 2.0

Ignacio Buse was the defending champion but chose not to defend his title.

Emilio Nava won the title via walkover after Luka Mikrut withdrew before the final due to a shoulder injury.

== Seeds ==
1. (Argentina) Marco Trungelliti (quarterfinals)
2. (United States) Emilio Nava (champion)
3. (United Kingdom) Jan Choinski (second round)
4. (Spain) Pedro Martínez (second round)
5. (Bolivia) Hugo Dellien (first round)
6. (Austria) Joel Schwärzler (first round)
7. (Belgium) Gauthier Onclin (first round)
8. (Argentina) Alex Barrena (first round)

== Draw ==
Key

- Q = Qualifier
- WC = Wild card
- LL = Lucky loser
- Alt = Alternate
- ITF = ITF entry
- PR = Protected ranking
- SR = Special ranking
- SE = Special exempt
- JE = Junior exempt
- JR = Junior Accelerator Programme entrant
- CO = College Accelerator Programme entrant
- NG = Next Gen Accelerator Program entrant
- w/o = Walkover
- r = Retired
- d = Defaulted

=== Finals ===
Semifinals
NG	(Germany) Diego Dedura	4	4
(Croatia) Luka Mikrut	6	6
Alt	(Germany) Henri Squire	1	4
2	(United States) Emilio Nava	6	6

Final
(Croatia) Luka Mikrut
2	(United States) Emilio Nava	w/o

=== Top half ===
First round
1	(Argentina) M Trungelliti	6	6
Q	(Jordan) A Shelbayh	3	4
(Chinese Taipei) Y-h Hsu	6	1	6
Q	(Netherlands) Sander Jong	4	6	4
NG	(Germany) D Dedura	6	6
Q	(Germany) M Wiskandt	1	4
(Brazil) JL Reis da Silva	6	3	6
8	(Argentina) A Barrena	3	6	3
3	(United Kingdom) J Choinski	6	6
(Germany) T Gentzsch	4	4
(Croatia) L Mikrut	7^{7}	7
Q	(Spain) Àlex Martí Pujolràs	6^{5}	5
Q	(Colombia) DE Galán	3	5
WC	(Germany) MH Rehberg	6	7
Q	(Germany) M Möller	5	6	6
7	(Belgium) G Onclin	7	1	4

Second round
1	(Argentina) M Trungelliti	3	6	6
(Chinese Taipei) Y-h Hsu	6	1	1
NG	(Germany) D Dedura	7^{14}	7^{8}
(Brazil) JL Reis da Silva	6^{12}	6^{6}
3	(United Kingdom) J Choinski	3	3
(Croatia) L Mikrut	6	6
WC	(Germany) MH Rehberg	3	4
Q	(Germany) M Möller	6	6

Quarterfinals
1	(Argentina) M Trungelliti	2	3
NG	(Germany) D Dedura	6	6
(Croatia) L Mikrut	5	7	6
Q	(Germany) M Möller	7	5	3

Semifinals
NG	(Germany) D Dedura	4	4
(Croatia) L Mikrut	6	6

=== Bottom half ===
First round
5	(Bolivia) H Dellien	3	5
WC	(Germany) M Schönhaus	6	7
WC	(Germany) Mika Petkovic	1	3
(Spain) A Moro Cañas	6	6
Alt	(Germany) H Squire	6	7
LL	(Australia) M Polmans	0	5
(Portugal) F Ferreira Silva	2	5
4	(Spain) P Martínez	6	7
6	(Austria) J Schwärzler	4	6	4
(Croatia) M Dodig	6	2	6
P Kotov	2	1
(Netherlands) G den Ouden	6	6
(Italy) L Giustino	6	2	4
(Germany) M Topo	2	6	6
(Netherlands) M Houkes	4	6^{3}
2	(United States) E Nava	6	7^{7}

Second round
WC	(Germany) M Schönhaus	7^{7}	3	4
(Spain) A Moro Cañas	6^{3}	6	6
Alt	(Germany) H Squire	7^{7}	6
4	(Spain) P Martínez	6^{4}	4
(Croatia) M Dodig	3	7^{7}	0
(Netherlands) G den Ouden	6	6^{4}	6
(Germany) M Topo	3	4
2	(United States) E Nava	6	6

Quarterfinals
(Spain) A Moro Cañas	6^{3}	3
Alt	(Germany) H Squire	7^{7}	6
(Netherlands) G den Ouden	6	2	4
2	(United States) E Nava	4	6	6

Semifinals
Alt	(Germany) H Squire	1	4
2	(United States) E Nava	6	6
