= 2015 Heilbronner Neckarcup – Doubles =

Doubles
- 2015 Heilbronner Neckarcup

Final
- Champion: (Poland) Mateusz Kowalczyk (Slovakia) Igor Zelenay
- Runner-up: (Germany) Dominik Meffert (Germany) Tim Pütz
- Score: 6–4, 6–3

Events
Singles	Doubles
← 2014 ·	Heilbronner Neckarcup	· 2016 →

Andre Begemann and Tim Pütz were the defending champion, but Begemann decided not to compete this year. Pütz played alongside Dominik Meffert and reached the final.

Mateusz Kowalczyk and Igor Zelenay won the title, defeating Pütz and Meffert in the final, 6–4, 6–3.

== Seeds ==
1. (Australia) Rameez Junaid / (Canada) Adil Shamasdin (quarterfinals)
2. (Poland) Mateusz Kowalczyk / (Slovakia) Igor Zelenay (champions)
3. (Kazakhstan) Andrey Golubev / (Kazakhstan) Aleksandr Nedovyesov (first round)
4. (Netherlands) Wesley Koolhof / (Netherlands) Matwé Middelkoop (quarterfinals)

== Draw ==
=== Key ===
- Q = Qualifier
- WC = Wild card
- LL = Lucky loser
- Alt = Alternate
- SE = Special exempt
- PR = Protected ranking
- ITF = ITF entry
- JE = Junior exempt
- w/o = Walkover
- r = Retired
- d = Defaulted
- SR = Special ranking

First round
1	(Australia) R Junaid (Canada) A Shamasdin	7^{10}	6
(United Kingdom) K Skupski (United Kingdom) N Skupski	6^{8}	3
Alt	(Germany) Alexander Mannapov (Germany) M Moraing	1	1
(Germany) D Brown (Germany) T Kamke	6	6
4	(Netherlands) W Koolhof (Netherlands) M Middelkoop	6^{3}	7	[10]
(Netherlands) J Huta Galung (Russia) K Kravchuk	7^{7}	5	[7]
(Australia) J Kubler (Australia) J Millman	2	6	[8]
(Germany) D Meffert (Germany) T Pütz	6	2	[10]
(Italy) A Motti (United States) D Novikov	6	6
(Lithuania) R Berankis (Argentina) G Pella	3	3
(Germany) A Beck (Germany) J-L Struff	6	6
3	(Kazakhstan) A Golubev (Kazakhstan) A Nedovyesov	4	4
(Belgium) M Authom (Romania) P Grigoriu	6	2	[8]
WC	(Germany) A Zverev (Germany) M Zverev	3	6	[10]
WC	(Germany) Florian Fallert (Germany) N Langer	4	4
2	(Poland) M Kowalczyk (Slovakia) I Zelenay	6	6

Quarterfinals
1	(Australia) R Junaid (Canada) A Shamasdin	6	6^{4}	[9]
(Germany) D Brown (Germany) T Kamke	2	7^{7}	[11]
4	(Netherlands) W Koolhof (Netherlands) M Middelkoop	6^{4}	6	[6]
(Germany) D Meffert (Germany) T Pütz	7^{7}	4	[10]
(Italy) A Motti (United States) D Novikov	6	7^{8}
(Germany) A Beck (Germany) J-L Struff	4	6^{6}
WC	(Germany) A Zverev (Germany) M Zverev	3	7	[6]
2	(Poland) M Kowalczyk (Slovakia) I Zelenay	6	5	[10]

Semifinals
(Germany) D Brown (Germany) T Kamke	3	6^{3}
(Germany) D Meffert (Germany) T Pütz	6	7^{7}
(Italy) A Motti (United States) D Novikov	1	4
2	(Poland) M Kowalczyk (Slovakia) I Zelenay	6	6

Final
(Germany) D Meffert (Germany) T Pütz	4	3
2	(Poland) M Kowalczyk (Slovakia) I Zelenay	6	6
