= 2022 Heilbronner Neckarcup – Doubles =

Doubles
- 2022 Heilbronner Neckarcup

Final
- Champions: (Colombia) Nicolás Barrientos (Mexico) Miguel Ángel Reyes-Varela
- Runners-up: (Netherlands) Jelle Sels (Netherlands) Bart Stevens
- Score: 7–5, 6–3

Events
Singles	Doubles
← 2021 ·	Heilbronner Neckarcup	· 2023 →

Nathaniel Lammons and Jackson Withrow were the defending champions but only Withrow chose to defend his title, partnering Denys Molchanov. Withrow lost in the quarterfinals to Andrej Martin and Tristan-Samuel Weissborn.

Nicolás Barrientos and Miguel Ángel Reyes-Varela won the title after defeating Jelle Sels and Bart Stevens 7–5, 6–3 in the final.

== Seeds ==
1. (Ukraine) Denys Molchanov / (United States) Jackson Withrow (quarterfinals)
2. (Serbia) Ivan Sabanov / (Serbia) Matej Sabanov (semifinals)
3. (United Kingdom) Jonny O'Mara / (Australia) John-Patrick Smith (first round)
4. (United States) Hunter Reese / (Netherlands) Sem Verbeek (quarterfinals)

== Draw ==
=== Key ===
- Q = Qualifier
- WC = Wild card
- LL = Lucky loser
- Alt = Alternate
- SE = Special exempt
- PR = Protected ranking
- ITF = ITF entry
- JE = Junior exempt
- w/o = Walkover
- r = Retired
- d = Defaulted
- SR = Special ranking

First round
1	(Ukraine) D Molchanov (United States) J Withrow	2	6	[10]
(Germany) H Jebens (Germany) J Lenz	6	2	[8]
WC	(Germany) C Frantzen (Germany) T Sandkaulen	5	7^{7}	[6]
(Slovakia) A Martin (Austria) T-S Weissborn	7	6^{5}	[10]
4	(United States) H Reese (Netherlands) S Verbeek	6	4	[10]
(Germany) D Brown (Lebanon) B Hassan	3	6	[4]
Alt	A Vatutin (Serbia) M Zekić	6	3	[5]
(Netherlands) J Sels (Netherlands) B Stevens	4	6	[10]
(Colombia) N Barrientos (Mexico) MÁ Reyes-Varela	6	6
(United States) J Cerretani (Australia) T Fancutt	2	3
(Romania) VV Cornea (Germany) F Fallert	6	4	[14]
3	(United Kingdom) J O'Mara (Australia) J-P Smith	2	6	[12]
(Italy) M Bortolotti (Spain) S Martos Gornés	6	6
WC	(Turkey) Y Erel (Turkey) K Kırcı	4	4
(India) Y Bhambri (India) S Myneni	6	4	[10]
2	(Serbia) I Sabanov (Serbia) M Sabanov	3	6	[12]

Quarterfinals
1	(Ukraine) D Molchanov (United States) J Withrow	2	4
(Slovakia) A Martin (Austria) T-S Weissborn	6	6
4	(United States) H Reese (Netherlands) S Verbeek	4	6^{5}
(Netherlands) J Sels (Netherlands) B Stevens	6	7^{7}
(Colombia) N Barrientos (Mexico) MÁ Reyes-Varela	6	7
(Romania) VV Cornea (Germany) F Fallert	4	5
(Italy) M Bortolotti (Spain) S Martos Gornés	1	5
2	(Serbia) I Sabanov (Serbia) M Sabanov	6	7

Semifinals
(Slovakia) A Martin (Austria) T-S Weissborn	1	1^{r}
(Netherlands) J Sels (Netherlands) B Stevens	6	2
(Colombia) N Barrientos (Mexico) MÁ Reyes-Varela	6	7^{7}
2	(Serbia) I Sabanov (Serbia) M Sabanov	1	6^{3}

Final
(Netherlands) J Sels (Netherlands) B Stevens	5	3
(Colombia) N Barrientos (Mexico) MÁ Reyes-Varela	7	6
