= 2014 Heilbronner Neckarcup – Doubles =

Doubles
- 2014 Heilbronner Neckarcup

Final
- Champion: (Germany) Andre Begemann (Germany) Tim Puetz
- Runner-up: (Netherlands) Jesse Huta Galung (Australia) Rameez Junaid
- Score: 6–3, 6–3

Events
Singles	Doubles
Heilbronner Neckarcup	· 2015 →

This was the first edition of the event. Andre Begemann and Tim Puetz won the title, defeating Jesse Huta Galung and Rameez Junaid in the final, 6–3, 6–3.

== Seeds ==
1. (Germany) Martin Emmrich / (United States) Nicholas Monroe (first round)
2. (Sweden) Johan Brunström / (Finland) Henri Kontinen (quarterfinals)
3. (Austria) Julian Knowle / (Slovakia) Michal Mertiňák (semifinals)
4. (Netherlands) Jesse Huta Galung / (Australia) Rameez Junaid (final)

== Draw ==
=== Key ===
- Q = Qualifier
- WC = Wild card
- LL = Lucky loser
- Alt = Alternate
- SE = Special exempt
- PR = Protected ranking
- ITF = ITF entry
- JE = Junior exempt
- w/o = Walkover
- r = Retired
- d = Defaulted
- SR = Special ranking

=== Draw ===
First round
1	(Germany) M Emmrich (United States) N Monroe	5	3
(Germany) A Beck (Austria) M Fischer	7	6
(Germany) A Begemann (Germany) T Puetz	7^{7}	6
(Netherlands) S Fransen (Netherlands) W Koolhof	6^{2}	4
3	(Austria) J Knowle (Slovakia) M Mertiňák	6	6
WC	(Brazil) A Ghem (Netherlands) S Groen	4	3
WC	(Germany) K Krawietz (Germany) F Moser	6	5	[1]
(Moldova) R Albot (New Zealand) A Sitak	2	7	[10]
Alt	(Austria) S Bader (Austria) A Haider-Maurer	2	4
PR	(Slovakia) A Martin (Slovakia) I Zelenay	6	6
PR	(Canada) F Dancevic (Ecuador) G Lapentti	3	4
4	(Netherlands) JH Galung (Australia) R Junaid	6	6
(Monaco) B Balleret (Italy) A Motti	4	6	[10]
(Germany) D Brown (India) P Raja	6	4	[7]
(Germany) P Marx (Germany) A Satschko	2	4
2	(Sweden) J Brunström (Finland) H Kontinen	6	6

Quarterfinals
(Germany) A Beck (Austria) M Fischer	5^{r}
(Germany) A Begemann (Germany) T Puetz	5
3	(Austria) J Knowle (Slovakia) M Mertiňák	6	6
(Moldova) R Albot (New Zealand) A Sitak	0	2
PR	(Slovakia) A Martin (Slovakia) I Zelenay	2	6	[5]
4	(Netherlands) JH Galung (Australia) R Junaid	6	4	[10]
(Monaco) B Balleret (Italy) A Motti	6	6
2	(Sweden) J Brunström (Finland) H Kontinen	4	3

Semifinals
(Germany) A Begemann (Germany) T Puetz	6	2	[10]
3	(Austria) J Knowle (Slovakia) M Mertiňák	2	6	[6]
4	(Netherlands) JH Galung (Australia) R Junaid	6	6
(Monaco) B Balleret (Italy) A Motti	2	3

Final
(Germany) A Begemann (Germany) T Puetz	6	6
4	(Netherlands) JH Galung (Australia) R Junaid	3	3

== Sources ==
- Main Draw
