= 2017 Heilbronner Neckarcup – Doubles =

Doubles
- 2017 Heilbronner Neckarcup

Final
- Champions: (Czech Republic) Roman Jebavý (Croatia) Antonio Šančić
- Runners-up: (Canada) Adil Shamasdin (Slovakia) Igor Zelenay
- Score: 6–4, 6–1

Events
Singles	Doubles
← 2016 ·	Heilbronner Neckarcup	· 2018 →

Sander Arends and Tristan-Samuel Weissborn were the defending champions but only Weissborn chose to defend his title, partnering Dino Marcan. Weissborn lost in the quarterfinals to Hugo Nys and Max Schnur.

Roman Jebavý and Antonio Šančić won the title after defeating Adil Shamasdin and Igor Zelenay 6–4, 6–1 in the final.

== Seeds ==
1. (Czech Republic) Roman Jebavý / (Croatia) Antonio Šančić (champions)
2. (Canada) Adil Shamasdin / (Slovakia) Igor Zelenay (final)
3. (Croatia) Dino Marcan / (Austria) Tristan-Samuel Weissborn (quarterfinals)
4. (United Kingdom) Ken Skupski / (United Kingdom) Neal Skupski (quarterfinals)

== Draw ==
=== Key ===
- Q = Qualifier
- WC = Wild card
- LL = Lucky loser
- Alt = Alternate
- SE = Special exempt
- PR = Protected ranking
- ITF = ITF entry
- JE = Junior exempt
- w/o = Walkover
- r = Retired
- d = Defaulted
- SR = Special ranking

First round
1	(Czech Republic) R Jebavý (Croatia) A Šančić	6	5	[10]
(Australia) Jarryd Chaplin (Australia) J-P Smith	4	7	[6]
(India) J Nedunchezhiyan (Indonesia) C Rungkat	6	5	[10]
(United States) J Cerretani (Germany) A Mies	1	7	[7]
3	(Croatia) D Marcan (Austria) T-S Weissborn	6	6
Q	(Hungary) M Fucsovics (United States) S Kozlov	4	4
(Switzerland) L Margaroli (Brazil) C Zampieri	2	1
(France) H Nys (United States) M Schnur	6	6
WC	(Germany) Y Maden (Germany) T Pütz	7^{7}	6^{3}	[11]
WC	(Germany) G Kretschmer (Germany) A Satschko	6^{3}	7^{7}	[13]
(Peru) S Galdós (Argentina) N Kicker	7	3	[15]
4	(United Kingdom) K Skupski (United Kingdom) N Skupski	5	6	[17]
(Uruguay) A Behar (Brazil) F Neis	7^{7}	2	[4]
WC	(Turkey) T Altuna (Netherlands) D Pel	6^{3}	6	[10]
(El Salvador) M Arévalo (Spain) Í Cervantes	4	4
2	(Canada) A Shamasdin (Slovakia) I Zelenay	6	6

Quarterfinals
1	(Czech Republic) R Jebavý (Croatia) A Šančić	6	6
(India) J Nedunchezhiyan (Indonesia) C Rungkat	3	3
3	(Croatia) D Marcan (Austria) T-S Weissborn	6^{5}	4
(France) H Nys (United States) M Schnur	7^{7}	6
WC	(Germany) G Kretschmer (Germany) A Satschko	7^{7}	6
4	(United Kingdom) K Skupski (United Kingdom) N Skupski	6^{5}	3
WC	(Turkey) T Altuna (Netherlands) D Pel	3	4
2	(Canada) A Shamasdin (Slovakia) I Zelenay	6	6

Semifinals
1	(Czech Republic) R Jebavý (Croatia) A Šančić	4	7^{10}	[10]
(France) H Nys (United States) M Schnur	6	6^{8}	[6]
WC	(Germany) G Kretschmer (Germany) A Satschko	6	6^{5}	[8]
2	(Canada) A Shamasdin (Slovakia) I Zelenay	4	7^{7}	[10]

Final
1	(Czech Republic) R Jebavý (Croatia) A Šančić	6	6
2	(Canada) A Shamasdin (Slovakia) I Zelenay	4	1
