= 2018 Heilbronner Neckarcup – Singles =

Singles
- 2018 Heilbronner Neckarcup

Final
- Champion: (Germany) Rudolf Molleker
- Runner-up: (Czech Republic) Jiří Veselý
- Score: 4–6, 6–4, 7–5

Events
Singles	Doubles
← 2017 ·	Heilbronner Neckarcup	· 2019 →

Filip Krajinović was the defending champion but chose not to defend his title.

Rudolf Molleker won the title after defeating Jiří Veselý 4–6, 6–4, 7–5 in the final.

== Seeds ==
1. (Australia) John Millman (first round)
2. (Czech Republic) Jiří Veselý (final)
3. (Germany) Yannick Maden (second round)
4. (Germany) Yannick Hanfmann (second round)
5. (Estonia) Jürgen Zopp (first round)
6. (Switzerland) Henri Laaksonen (quarterfinals)
7. (Russia) Alexey Vatutin (quarterfinals)
8. (Slovakia) Norbert Gombos (first round)

== Draw ==
=== Key ===
- Q = Qualifier
- WC = Wild card
- LL = Lucky loser
- Alt = Alternate
- SE = Special exempt
- PR = Protected ranking
- ITF = ITF entry
- JE = Junior exempt
- w/o = Walkover
- r = Retired
- d = Defaulted
- SR = Special ranking

=== Finals ===
Semifinals
(Argentina) Juan Ignacio Londero	6	3	2
WC	(Germany) Rudolf Molleker	4	6	6
(Poland) Kamil Majchrzak	5	2
2	(Czech Republic) Jiří Veselý	7	6

Final
WC	(Germany) Rudolf Molleker	4	6	7
2	(Czech Republic) Jiří Veselý	6	4	5

=== Top half ===
First round
1	(Australia) J Millman	6	1	2
(Argentina) JI Londero	1	6	6
WC	(Germany) D Köpfer	7	6
Q	(Germany) D Masur	5	4
(Germany) O Otte	4	6	7^{8}
(Slovenia) B Rola	6	3	6^{6}
WC	(Germany) T Pütz	6	4	6
8	(Slovakia) N Gombos	4	6	3
4	(Germany) Y Hanfmann	6	4	6
(Australia) M Polmans	2	6	3
(Spain) E López Pérez	4	3
WC	(Germany) R Molleker	6	6
(Germany) T Kamke	0	4
Q	(Spain) B Zapata Miralles	6	6
(Serbia) P Krstin	2	2
7	(Russia) A Vatutin	6	6

Second round
(Argentina) JI Londero	7^{7}	5	6
WC	(Germany) D Köpfer	6^{2}	7	3
(Germany) O Otte	7	6^{6}	7^{8}
WC	(Germany) T Pütz	5	7^{8}	6^{6}
4	(Germany) Y Hanfmann	6	3	3
WC	(Germany) R Molleker	4	6	6
Q	(Spain) B Zapata Miralles	6	4	2
7	(Russia) A Vatutin	4	6	6

Quarterfinals
(Argentina) JI Londero	6	3	6
(Germany) O Otte	4	6	3
WC	(Germany) R Molleker	6	2	6
7	(Russia) A Vatutin	1	6	4

Semifinals
(Argentina) JI Londero	6	3	2
WC	(Germany) R Molleker	4	6	6

=== Bottom half ===
First round
5	(Estonia) J Zopp	4	6^{5}
(Germany) M Moraing	6	7^{7}
(Norway) C Ruud	6^{4}	6	3
(Germany) D Brown	7^{7}	4	6
(Poland) K Majchrzak	6	6
(Egypt) M Safwat	3	4
(United States) D Novikov	4	0^{r}
3	(Germany) Y Maden	6	3
6	(Switzerland) H Laaksonen	4	6	6
(Italy) A Giannessi	6	4	4
(Germany) M Bachinger	2	7^{7}	3
Q	(Germany) B Hassan	6	6^{3}	6
(Barbados) D King	4	1^{r}
Q	(Netherlands) I Sijsling	6	4
WC	(Germany) M Möller	2	2
2	(Czech Republic) J Veselý	6	6

Second round
(Germany) M Moraing
(Germany) D Brown	w/o
(Poland) K Majchrzak	6	6
3	(Germany) Y Maden	4	3
6	(Switzerland) H Laaksonen	6^{5}	6	7
Q	(Germany) B Hassan	7^{7}	2	5
Q	(Netherlands) I Sijsling	3	6	2
2	(Czech Republic) J Veselý	6	4	6

Quarterfinals
(Germany) D Brown	3	1^{r}
(Poland) K Majchrzak	6	3
6	(Switzerland) H Laaksonen	3	1
2	(Czech Republic) J Veselý	6	6

Semifinals
(Poland) K Majchrzak	5	2
2	(Czech Republic) J Veselý	7	6
