= 2015 Heilbronner Neckarcup =

- Date: 11–17 May
- Edition: 2nd
- Draw: 32S / 16D
- Prize money: €42,500+H
- Surface: Clay
- Location: Heilbronn, Germany

Champions

Singles
- (Germany) Alexander Zverev

Doubles
- (Poland) Mateusz Kowalczyk / (Slovakia) Igor Zelenay
← 2014 ·	Heilbronner Neckarcup	· 2016 →

The 2015 Heilbronner Neckarcup was a professional tennis tournament played on clay courts. It was the second edition of the tournament which was part of the 2015 ATP Challenger Tour. It took place in Heilbronn, Germany between 11 and 17 May 2015.

== Singles main-draw entrants ==
=== Seeds ===
Country	Player	Rank^{1}	Seed
BIH	Damir Džumhur	81	1
GER	Jan-Lennard Struff	87	2
LTU	Ričardas Berankis	91	3
GER	Dustin Brown	104	4
GER	Alexander Zverev	110	5
GER	Tobias Kamke	113	6
CZE	Radek Štěpánek	115	7
KAZ	Andrey Golubev	119	8

- ^{1} Rankings are as of May 4, 2015.

=== Other entrants ===
The following players received wildcards into the singles main draw:

- (Germany) Daniel Brands
- (Germany) Jan Choinski
- (Germany) Nils Langer

The following players received entry from the qualifying draw:

- (Netherlands) Jesse Huta Galung
- (Germany) Jeremy Jahn
- (Slovakia) Jozef Kovalík
- (Germany) Mats Moraing

The following player received entry as a lucky loser:

- (Switzerland) Henri Laaksonen

== Doubles main-draw entrants ==
=== Seeds ===
Country	Player	Country	Player	Rank^{1}	Seed
AUS	Rameez Junaid	CAN	Adil Shamasdin	123	1
POL	Mateusz Kowalczyk	SVK	Igor Zelenay	216	2
KAZ	Andrey Golubev	KAZ	Aleksandr Nedovyesov	219	3
NED	Wesley Koolhof	NED	Matwé Middelkoop	240	4

- ^{1} Rankings are as of May 4, 2015.

=== Other entrants ===
The following pairs received wildcards into the doubles main draw:

- (Germany) Florian Fallert / (Germany) Nils Langer
- (Germany) Alexander Zverev / (Germany) Mischa Zverev

The following pair received entry as an alternate:

- (Germany) Alexander Mannapov / (Germany) Mats Moraing

== Champions ==
=== Singles ===
- (Germany) Alexander Zverev def. (Argentina) Guido Pella, 6–1, 7–6^{(9–7)}

=== Doubles ===
- (Poland) Mateusz Kowalczyk / (Slovakia) Igor Zelenay def. (Germany) Dominik Meffert / (Germany) Tim Pütz, 6–4, 6–3
