= 2017 Heilbronner Neckarcup =

- Date: 15 – 21 May
- Edition: 4th
- Draw: 32S / 16D
- Surface: Clay
- Location: Heilbronn, Germany

Champions

Singles
- (Serbia) Filip Krajinović

Doubles
- (Czech Republic) Roman Jebavý / (Croatia) Antonio Šančić
| ← 2016 · | Heilbronner Neckarcup | · 2018 → |

The 2017 Heilbronner Neckarcup was a professional tennis tournament played on clay courts. It was the fourth edition of the tournament which was part of the 2017 ATP Challenger Tour. It took place in Heilbronn, Germany between 15 and 21 May 2017.

== Point distribution ==
| Event | W | F | SF | QF | Round of 16 | Round of 32 | Q | Q2 |
| Singles | 90 | 55 | 33 | 17 | 8 | 0 | 5 | 0 |
| Doubles | 90 | 55 | 33 | 17 | 0 | — | — | — |

== Singles main-draw entrants ==
=== Seeds ===
| Country | Player | Rank^{1} | Seed |
|---|---|---|---|
| ARG | Nicolás Kicker | 92 | 1 |
| RUS | Evgeny Donskoy | 94 | 2 |
| CZE | Adam Pavlásek | 95 | 3 |
| SVK | Norbert Gombos | 103 | 4 |
| SUI | Henri Laaksonen | 105 | 5 |
| ARG | Guido Pella | 109 | 6 |
| SVK | Andrej Martin | 112 | 7 |
| NOR | Casper Ruud | 119 | 8 |

- ^{1} Rankings are as of May 8, 2017.

=== Other entrants ===
The following players received wildcards into the singles main draw:

- (Germany) Daniel Altmaier
- (Germany) Daniel Brands
- (Turkey) Marsel İlhan
- (Germany) Yannick Maden

The following players received entry from the qualifying draw:

- (Australia) Sam Groth
- (Germany) Dominik Köpfer
- (Serbia) Filip Krajinović
- (Germany) Cedrik-Marcel Stebe

== Champions ==
=== Singles ===
- (Serbia) Filip Krajinović def. (Slovakia) Norbert Gombos 6–3, 6–2.

=== Doubles ===
- (Czech Republic) Roman Jebavý / (Croatia) Antonio Šančić def. (Canada) Adil Shamasdin / (Slovakia) Igor Zelenay 6–4, 6–1.
