= 2017 Heilbronner Neckarcup – Singles =

Singles
- 2017 Heilbronner Neckarcup

Final
- Champion: (Serbia) Filip Krajinović
- Runner-up: (Slovakia) Norbert Gombos
- Score: 6–3, 6–2

Events
Singles	Doubles
← 2016 ·	Heilbronner Neckarcup	· 2018 →

Nikoloz Basilashvili was the defending champion but chose not to defend his title.

Filip Krajinović won the title after defeating Norbert Gombos 6–3, 6–2 in the final.

== Seeds ==
1. (Argentina) Nicolás Kicker (first round)
2. (Russia) Evgeny Donskoy (first round)
3. (Czech Republic) Adam Pavlásek (first round)
4. (Slovakia) Norbert Gombos (final)
5. (Switzerland) Henri Laaksonen (first round)
6. (Argentina) Guido Pella (semifinals)
7. (Slovakia) Andrej Martin (quarterfinals)
8. (Norway) Casper Ruud (quarterfinals)

== Draw ==
=== Key ===
- Q = Qualifier
- WC = Wild card
- LL = Lucky loser
- Alt = Alternate
- SE = Special exempt
- PR = Protected ranking
- ITF = ITF entry
- JE = Junior exempt
- w/o = Walkover
- r = Retired
- d = Defaulted
- SR = Special ranking

=== Finals ===
Semifinals
(Italy) Lorenzo Giustino	3	5
4	(Slovakia) Norbert Gombos	6	7
Q	(Serbia) Filip Krajinović	4	6	7^{7}
6	(Argentina) Guido Pella	6	3	6^{4}

Final
4	(Slovakia) Norbert Gombos	3	2
Q	(Serbia) Filip Krajinović	6	6

=== Top half ===
First round
1	(Argentina) N Kicker	2	6	1
Q	(Germany) D Köpfer	6	3	6
(United States) D Novikov	4	4
(Italy) L Giustino	6	6
(Slovakia) J Kovalík	6^{0}	4
(Kazakhstan) A Bublik	7^{7}	6
Q	(Australia) S Groth	3	3
7	(Slovakia) A Martin	6	6
4	(Slovakia) N Gombos	4	7^{7}	6
WC	(Germany) D Brands	6	6^{5}	3
WC	(Germany) D Altmaier	4	4
(Canada) S Diez	6	6
(France) C Lestienne	2	1
(Bosnia and Herzegovina) M Bašić	6	6
WC	(Turkey) M İlhan	2	6	1
8	(Norway) C Ruud	6	4	6

Second round
Q	(Germany) D Köpfer	6^{4}	6	1
(Italy) L Giustino	7^{7}	1	6
(Kazakhstan) A Bublik	6	3	3
7	(Slovakia) A Martin	4	6	6
4	(Slovakia) N Gombos	6	6
(Canada) S Diez	1	4
(Bosnia and Herzegovina) M Bašić	5	7^{7}	5
8	(Norway) C Ruud	7	6^{4}	7

Quarterfinals
(Italy) L Giustino	6	7
7	(Slovakia) A Martin	3	5
4	(Slovakia) N Gombos	6	7
8	(Norway) C Ruud	4	5

Semifinals
(Italy) L Giustino	3	5
4	(Slovakia) N Gombos	6	7

=== Bottom half ===
First round
5	(Switzerland) H Laaksonen	2	1
Q	(Serbia) F Krajinović	6	6
(Germany) T Kamke	6	5	7^{7}
(United States) S Kozlov	4	7	6^{4}
(Belarus) U Ignatik	6^{5}	1
(Belgium) K Coppejans	7^{7}	6
(Hungary) M Fucsovics	6	7
3	(Czech Republic) A Pavlásek	2	5
6	(Argentina) G Pella	6	7^{7}
Q	(Germany) C-M Stebe	4	6^{2}
WC	(Germany) Y Maden	6^{6}	1
(Serbia) L Đere	7^{8}	6
(Italy) M Cecchinato	6	6
(Canada) D Shapovalov	3	4
(United States) M Krueger	6	4	6
2	(Russia) E Donskoy	0	6	4

Second round
Q	(Serbia) F Krajinović	6	1
(Germany) T Kamke	1	0^{r}
(Belgium) K Coppejans	6	3	3
(Hungary) M Fucsovics	3	6	6
6	(Argentina) G Pella	6	6
(Serbia) L Đere	1	0
(Italy) M Cecchinato	6	6
(United States) M Krueger	3	2

Quarterfinals
Q	(Serbia) F Krajinović	7^{7}	7^{7}
(Hungary) M Fucsovics	6^{2}	6^{3}
6	(Argentina) G Pella	6	6
(Italy) M Cecchinato	2	2

Semifinals
Q	(Serbia) F Krajinović	4	6	7^{7}
6	(Argentina) G Pella	6	3	6^{4}
