= 2024 Heilbronner Neckarcup =

- Date: 3–9 June
- Edition: 10th
- Surface: Clay
- Location: Heilbronn, Germany

Champions

Singles
- (India) Sumit Nagal

Doubles
- (Monaco) Romain Arneodo / (France) Geoffrey Blancaneaux
← 2023 ·	Heilbronner Neckarcup	· 2025 →

The 2024 Heilbronner Neckarcup was a professional tennis tournament played on clay courts. It was the tenth edition of the tournament which was part of the 2024 ATP Challenger Tour. It took place in Heilbronn, Germany between 3 and 9 June 2024.

== Champions ==
=== Singles ===
- (India) Sumit Nagal def. (Switzerland) Alexander Ritschard 6–1, 6–7^{(5–7)}, 6–3.

=== Doubles ===
- (Monaco) Romain Arneodo / (France) Geoffrey Blancaneaux def. (Germany) Jakob Schnaitter / (Germany) Mark Wallner 7–6^{(7–5)}, 5–7, [10–3].

== Singles main-draw entrants ==
=== Seeds ===
Country	Player	Rank^{1}	Seed
GER	Daniel Altmaier	83	1
GER	Yannick Hanfmann	85	2
IND	Sumit Nagal	95	3
GER	Maximilian Marterer	101	4
FRA	Luca Van Assche	103	5
COL	Daniel Elahi Galán	106	6
ESP	Albert Ramos Viñolas	111	7
AUT	Jurij Rodionov	139	8

- ^{1} Rankings are as of 27 May 2024.

=== Other entrants ===
The following players received wildcards into the singles main draw:

- (Germany) Daniel Altmaier
- (Germany) Yannick Hanfmann
- (Germany) Marko Topo

The following players received entry into the singles main draw as alternates:

- (Germany) Sebastian Fanselow
- (Denmark) August Holmgren

The following players received entry from the qualifying draw:

- (Georgia (country)) Nikoloz Basilashvili
- (Brazil) Daniel Dutra da Silva
- (United Kingdom) Felix Gill
- (Germany) Peter Heller
- (Germany) Daniel Masur
- (Germany) Lasse Pörtner
