= 2016 Heilbronner Neckarcup – Singles =

Singles
- 2016 Heilbronner Neckarcup

Final
- Champion: (Georgia (country)) Nikoloz Basilashvili
- Runner-up: (Germany) Jan-Lennard Struff
- Score: 6–4, 7–6^{(7–3)}

Events
Singles	Doubles
← 2015 ·	Heilbronner Neckarcup	· 2017 →

Alexander Zverev was the defending champion, but chose not to defend his title.

Nikoloz Basilashvili won the title after defeating Jan-Lennard Struff 6–4, 7–6^{(7–3)} in the final.

== Seeds ==
1. (Lithuania) Ričardas Berankis (first round)
2. (Argentina) Horacio Zeballos (first round)
3. (Spain) Albert Montañés (semifinals)
4. (Spain) Daniel Muñoz de la Nava (first round)
5. (Japan) Yoshihito Nishioka (first round)
6. (Germany) Jan-Lennard Struff (final)
7. (Germany) Dustin Brown (first round)
8. (Netherlands) Igor Sijsling (quarterfinals)

== Draw ==
=== Key ===
- Q = Qualifier
- WC = Wild card
- LL = Lucky loser
- Alt = Alternate
- SE = Special exempt
- PR = Protected ranking
- ITF = ITF entry
- JE = Junior exempt
- w/o = Walkover
- r = Retired
- d = Defaulted
- SR = Special ranking

=== Finals ===
Semifinals
(Slovakia) Jozef Kovalík	6	4	3
(Georgia (country)) Nikoloz Basilashvili	1	6	6
3	(Spain) Albert Montañés	0	3
6	(Germany) Jan-Lennard Struff	6	6

Final
(Georgia (country)) Nikoloz Basilashvili	6	7^{7}
6	(Germany) Jan-Lennard Struff	4	6^{3}

=== Top half ===
First round
1	(Lithuania) R Berankis	3	6	3
(Turkey) M İlhan	6	1	6
WC	(Serbia) J Tipsarević	5	3
(Argentina) C Berlocq	7	6
(Russia) A Rublev	2	2
(Croatia) F Škugor	6	6
(Slovakia) J Kovalík	6	4	6
5	(Japan) Y Nishioka	2	6	3
4	(Spain) D Muñoz de la Nava	4	1
(Georgia (country)) N Basilashvili	6	6
Q	(Germany) P Torebko	6	2	3
(Slovenia) B Rola	3	6	6
WC	(Germany) M Marterer	7^{7}	6
Q	(Germany) A Beck	6^{2}	2
(Spain) A Menéndez-Maceiras	1	6^{8}
8	(Netherlands) I Sijsling	6	7^{10}

Second round
(Turkey) M İlhan	6	2	3
(Argentina) C Berlocq	2	6	6
(Croatia) F Škugor	6^{5}	2
(Slovakia) J Kovalík	7^{7}	6
(Georgia (country)) N Basilashvili	6^{4}	6	7^{7}
(Slovenia) B Rola	7^{7}	3	6^{5}
WC	(Germany) M Marterer	2	4
8	(Netherlands) I Sijsling	6	6

Quarterfinals
(Argentina) C Berlocq	1	4
(Slovakia) J Kovalík	6	6
(Georgia (country)) N Basilashvili	6	3	6
8	(Netherlands) I Sijsling	2	6	4

Semifinals
(Slovakia) J Kovalík	6	4	3
(Georgia (country)) N Basilashvili	1	6	6

=== Bottom half ===
First round
7	(Germany) D Brown	3	6	2
LL	(Belgium) Y Reuter	6	3	6
(Japan) G Soeda	4	5
WC	(Germany) Y Maden	6	7
(Argentina) N Kicker	6	6
Q	(Germany) K Krawietz	4	2
Q	(Switzerland) H Laaksonen	4	3
3	(Spain) A Montañés	6	6
6	(Germany) J-L Struff	7^{7}	7^{8}
(Germany) M Zverev	6^{3}	6^{6}
(United States) R Harrison	6	3	2
(Argentina) R Olivo	3	6	6
(Colombia) A González	6	3	3
(United States) F Tiafoe	3	6	6
WC	(Germany) F Mayer	4	7	6
2	(Argentina) H Zeballos	6	5	4

Second round
LL	(Belgium) Y Reuter	6	6
WC	(Germany) Y Maden	3	4
(Argentina) N Kicker	3	1
3	(Spain) A Montañés	6	6
6	(Germany) J-L Struff	7	6^{3}	6
(Argentina) R Olivo	5	7^{7}	4
(United States) F Tiafoe	3	6	1
WC	(Germany) F Mayer	6	1	6

Quarterfinals
LL	(Belgium) Y Reuter	1	4
3	(Spain) A Montañés	6	6
6	(Germany) J-L Struff	6	6
WC	(Germany) F Mayer	2	3

Semifinals
3	(Spain) A Montañés	0	3
6	(Germany) J-L Struff	6	6
