= 2025 Heilbronner Neckarcup – Singles =

Singles
- 2025 Heilbronner Neckarcup

Final
- Champion: (Peru) Ignacio Buse
- Runner-up: (Netherlands) Guy den Ouden
- Score: 7–5, 7–5

Events
Singles	Doubles
- Heilbronner Neckarcup

Sumit Nagal was the defending champion but lost in the second round to Rodrigo Pacheco Méndez.

Ignacio Buse won the title after defeating Guy den Ouden 7–5, 7–5 in the final.

== Seeds ==
1. (Italy) Luca Nardi (first round)
2. (Spain) Pablo Carreño Busta (first round)
3. (Denmark) Elmer Møller (first round)
4. (France) Valentin Royer (second round)
5. (United States) Emilio Nava (quarterfinals)
6. (Italy) Francesco Passaro (quarterfinals)
7. (India) Sumit Nagal (second round)
8. (Italy) Andrea Pellegrino (first round)

== Draw ==
Key

- Q = Qualifier
- WC = Wild card
- LL = Lucky loser
- Alt = Alternate
- ITF = ITF entry
- PR = Protected ranking
- SR = Special ranking
- SE = Special exempt
- JE = Junior exempt
- JR = Junior Accelerator Programme entrant
- CO = College Accelerator Programme entrant
- NG = Next Gen Accelerator Program entrant
- w/o = Walkover
- r = Retired
- d = Defaulted

=== Finals ===
Semifinals
Q	(Germany) Marko Topo	5	3
(Netherlands) Guy den Ouden	7	6
(Argentina) Marco Trungelliti	4	6^{3}
(Peru) Ignacio Buse	6	7^{7}

Final
(Netherlands) Guy den Ouden	5	5
(Peru) Ignacio Buse	7	7

=== Top half ===
First round
1	(Italy) L Nardi	3	6	3
(Spain) D Rincón	6	3	6
WC	(Germany) J Engel	3	3
(Argentina) F Mena	6	6
(Switzerland) D Stricker	6	7
Q	A Vatutin	3	5
Q	(Germany) M Topo	6	6
8	(Italy) A Pellegrino	3	0
3	(Denmark) E Møller	6^{5}	5
(Netherlands) G den Ouden	7^{7}	7
(Belgium) G Onclin	3	6	7^{8}
LL	(Italy) F Maestrelli	6	4	6^{6}
WC	(Germany) D Dedura	7	7
Q	(Germany) H Squire	5	5
M Sharipov	3	3
5	(United States) E Nava	6	6

Second round
(Spain) D Rincón	5	6^{0}
(Argentina) F Mena	7	7^{7}
(Switzerland) D Stricker	7^{7}	6^{4}	0^{r}
Q	(Germany) M Topo	6^{5}	7^{7}	0
(Netherlands) G den Ouden	6	6
(Belgium) G Onclin	3	2
WC	(Germany) D Dedura	4	4
5	(United States) E Nava	6	6

Quarterfinals
(Argentina) F Mena	3	6	3
Q	(Germany) M Topo	6	3	6
(Netherlands) G den Ouden	7	6
5	(United States) E Nava	5	3

Semifinals
Q	(Germany) M Topo	5	3
(Netherlands) G den Ouden	7	6

=== Bottom half ===
First round
7	(India) S Nagal	6	6
WC	(Germany) T Gentzsch	1	4
(Spain) P Martín Tiffon	6	3	1
(Mexico) R Pacheco Méndez	3	6	6
(Argentina) M Trungelliti	7^{8}	0	6
(United Kingdom) J Choinski	6^{6}	6	2
Q	(Germany) M Wiskandt	6^{5}	7	4
4	(France) V Royer	7^{7}	5	6
6	(Italy) F Passaro	6^{4}	7^{7}	6
Q	(Germany) F Broska	7^{7}	6^{2}	1
(Netherlands) M Houkes	2	4
(Norway) V Durasovic	6	6
(Kazakhstan) T Skatov	1	6^{4}
(Peru) I Buse	6	7^{7}
(Kazakhstan) D Yevseyev	7	7
2	(Spain) P Carreño Busta	5	5

Second round
7	(India) S Nagal	5	7^{7}	0
(Mexico) R Pacheco Méndez	7	6^{2}	6
(Argentina) M Trungelliti	6	4	6
4	(France) V Royer	1	6	4
6	(Italy) F Passaro	6	6
(Norway) V Durasovic	3	4
(Peru) I Buse	6	6
(Kazakhstan) D Yevseyev	0	3

Quarterfinals
(Mexico) R Pacheco Méndez	6	4	2
(Argentina) M Trungelliti	2	6	6
6	(Italy) F Passaro	6	1	4
(Peru) I Buse	3	6	6

Semifinals
(Argentina) M Trungelliti	4	6^{3}
(Peru) I Buse	6	7^{7}
