= 2015 Heilbronner Neckarcup – Singles =

Singles
- 2015 Heilbronner Neckarcup

Final
- Champion: (Germany) Alexander Zverev
- Runner-up: (Argentina) Guido Pella
- Score: 6–1, 7–6^{(9–7)}

Events
Singles	Doubles
← 2014 ·	Heilbronner Neckarcup	· 2016 →

Jan-Lennard Struff was the defending champion, but he lost in the semifinals to Alexander Zverev.

Zverev went on to win the title, defeating Guido Pella in the final, 6–1, 7–6^{(9–7)}.

== Seeds ==
1. (Bosnia and Herzegovina) Damir Džumhur (first round)
2. (Germany) Jan-Lennard Struff (semifinals)
3. (Lithuania) Ričardas Berankis (first round)
4. (Germany) Dustin Brown (first round)
5. (Germany) Alexander Zverev (champion)
6. (Germany) Tobias Kamke (first round)
7. (Czech Republic) Radek Štěpánek (first round)
8. (Kazakhstan) Andrey Golubev (second round)

== Draw ==
=== Key ===
- Q = Qualifier
- WC = Wild card
- LL = Lucky loser
- Alt = Alternate
- SE = Special exempt
- PR = Protected ranking
- ITF = ITF entry
- JE = Junior exempt
- w/o = Walkover
- r = Retired
- d = Defaulted
- SR = Special ranking

=== Finals ===
Semifinals
(Argentina) Guido Pella	6	6
(Japan) Yoshihito Nishioka	0	1
5	(Germany) Alexander Zverev	6	7^{7}
2	(Germany) Jan-Lennard Struff	3	6^{2}

Final
(Argentina) Guido Pella	1	6^{7}
5	(Germany) Alexander Zverev	6	7^{9}

=== Top half ===
First round
1	(Bosnia and Herzegovina) D Džumhur	4	4
(Germany) A Beck	6	6
(Australia) J Kubler	6^{12}	6	7
Q	(Germany) Jeremy Jahn	7^{14}	4	5
WC	(Germany) J Choinski	6^{6}	5
(Romania) M Copil	7^{8}	7
(Argentina) G Pella	7^{7}	7
6	(Germany) T Kamke	6^{5}	5
3	(Lithuania) R Berankis	6^{6}	4
(Germany) M Berrer	7^{8}	6
Q	(Slovakia) J Kovalík	7^{7}	6
(Kazakhstan) A Nedovyesov	6^{3}	4
(Japan) Y Nishioka	6	6^{3}	7^{7}
(Netherlands) I Sijsling	4	7^{7}	6^{5}
(Belgium) M Authom	2	1
8	(Kazakhstan) A Golubev	6	6

Second round
(Germany) A Beck	6	6
(Australia) J Kubler	3	2
(Romania) M Copil	2	3
(Argentina) G Pella	6	6
(Germany) M Berrer	3	2
Q	(Slovakia) J Kovalík	6	6
(Japan) Y Nishioka	7	4	7
8	(Kazakhstan) A Golubev	5	6	5

Quarterfinals
(Germany) A Beck	1	5
(Argentina) G Pella	6	7
Q	(Slovakia) J Kovalík	3	4
(Japan) Y Nishioka	6	6

Semifinals
(Argentina) G Pella	6	6
(Japan) Y Nishioka	0	1

=== Bottom half ===
First round
5	(Germany) A Zverev	6	6
(Argentina) H Zeballos	4	2
LL	(Switzerland) H Laaksonen	3	6	3
(United States) D Novikov	6	3	6
Q	(Germany) M Moraing	3	4
WC	(Germany) N Langer	6	6
(United States) B Fratangelo	4	7	7^{7}
4	(Germany) D Brown	6	5	6^{1}
7	(Czech Republic) R Štěpánek	3	5
(Germany) M Bachinger	6	7
WC	(Germany) D Brands	6	6
(Russia) K Kravchuk	3	2
(Moldova) R Albot	1	7	6
(Australia) J Millman	6	5	4
Q	(Netherlands) J Huta Galung	3	2
2	(Germany) J-L Struff	6	6

Second round
5	(Germany) A Zverev	6	6
(United States) D Novikov	2	3
WC	(Germany) N Langer	6^{0}	5
(United States) B Fratangelo	7^{7}	7
(Germany) M Bachinger	6	7^{9}
WC	(Germany) D Brands	3	6^{7}
(Moldova) R Albot	6	3	4
2	(Germany) J-L Struff	2	6	6

Quarterfinals
5	(Germany) A Zverev	4	6	6
(United States) B Fratangelo	6	4	3
(Germany) M Bachinger	6	3	3
2	(Germany) J-L Struff	3	6	6

Semifinals
5	(Germany) A Zverev	6	7^{7}
2	(Germany) J-L Struff	3	6^{2}
