= 2018 Heilbronner Neckarcup – Doubles =

Doubles
- 2018 Heilbronner Neckarcup

Final
- Champions: (Australia) Rameez Junaid (Netherlands) David Pel
- Runners-up: (Germany) Kevin Krawietz (Germany) Andreas Mies
- Score: 6–2, 2–6, [10–7]

Events
Singles	Doubles
← 2017 ·	Heilbronner Neckarcup	· 2019 →

Roman Jebavý and Antonio Šančić were the defending champions but only Jebavý chose to defend his title, partnering Florin Mergea. Jebavý lost in the first round to Denys Molchanov and Igor Zelenay.

Rameez Junaid and David Pel won the title after defeating Kevin Krawietz and Andreas Mies 6–2, 2–6, [10–7] in the final.

== Seeds ==
1. (Netherlands) Matwé Middelkoop / (Argentina) Andrés Molteni (first round)
2. (United Kingdom) Ken Skupski / (United Kingdom) Neal Skupski (first round)
3. (Germany) Andre Begemann / (Israel) Jonathan Erlich (first round)
4. (Ukraine) Denys Molchanov / (Slovakia) Igor Zelenay (semifinals)

== Draw ==
=== Key ===
- Q = Qualifier
- WC = Wild card
- LL = Lucky loser
- Alt = Alternate
- SE = Special exempt
- PR = Protected ranking
- ITF = ITF entry
- JE = Junior exempt
- w/o = Walkover
- r = Retired
- d = Defaulted
- SR = Special ranking

First round
1	(Netherlands) M Middelkoop (Argentina) A Molteni	7	6^{7}	[9]
Q	(Netherlands) Miliaan Niesten (Netherlands) I Sijsling	5	7^{9}	[11]
WC	(Argentina) JI Londero (Germany) M Moraing
(Australia) R Junaid (Netherlands) D Pel	w/o
4	(Ukraine) D Molchanov (Slovakia) I Zelenay	6^{5}	6	[10]
(Czech Republic) R Jebavý (Romania) F Mergea	7^{7}	4	[4]
(United States) D Novikov (Russia) A Vatutin
(Germany) P Petzschner (Germany) T Pütz	w/o
WC	(Turkey) T Altuna (Brazil) F Romboli	2	3
WC	(Italy) A Giannessi (Spain) E López Pérez	6	6
(Germany) K Krawietz (Germany) A Mies	3	6	[12]
3	(Germany) A Begemann (Israel) J Erlich	6	3	[10]
(India) J Nedunchezhiyan (Austria) T-S Weissborn	6	6
(Germany) D Brown (Barbados) D King	3	4
(Belgium) S Gillé (Belgium) J Vliegen	7^{9}	6
2	(United Kingdom) K Skupski (United Kingdom) N Skupski	6^{7}	4

Quarterfinals
Q	(Netherlands) M Niesten (Netherlands) I Sijsling	4	1
(Australia) R Junaid (Netherlands) D Pel	6	6
4	(Ukraine) D Molchanov (Slovakia) I Zelenay	6	2	[10]
(Germany) P Petzschner (Germany) T Pütz	2	6	[6]
WC	(Italy) A Giannessi (Spain) E López Pérez	1	0
(Germany) K Krawietz (Germany) A Mies	6	6
(India) J Nedunchezhiyan (Austria) T-S Weissborn	6	3	[4]
(Belgium) S Gillé (Belgium) J Vliegen	3	6	[10]

Semifinals
(Australia) R Junaid (Netherlands) D Pel	6	6
4	(Ukraine) D Molchanov (Slovakia) I Zelenay	1	4
(Germany) K Krawietz (Germany) A Mies	6	7^{8}
(Belgium) S Gillé (Belgium) J Vliegen	1	6^{6}

Final
(Australia) R Junaid (Netherlands) D Pel	6	2	[10]
(Germany) K Krawietz (Germany) A Mies	2	6	[7]
