= 2016 Heilbronner Neckarcup – Doubles =

Doubles
- 2016 Heilbronner Neckarcup

Final
- Champion: (Netherlands) Sander Arends (Austria) Tristan-Samuel Weissborn
- Runner-up: (Croatia) Nikola Mektić (Croatia) Antonio Šančić
- Score: 6–3, 6–4

Events
Singles	Doubles
← 2015 ·	Heilbronner Neckarcup	· 2017 →

Mateusz Kowalczyk and Igor Zelenay were the defending champions but chose to participate with different partners. Kowalczyk partnered Tomasz Bednarek while Zelenay partnered Rameez Junaid. Both failed to defend their title, with Kowalczyk losing to Zelenay in the first round and Zelenay losing to Sander Arends and Tristan-Samuel Weissborn in the quarterfinals.

Sander Arends and Tristan-Samuel Weissborn won the title after defeating Nikola Mektić and Antonio Šančić 6–3, 6–4 in the final.

== Seeds ==
1. (Chile) Julio Peralta / (Argentina) Horacio Zeballos (quarterfinals)
2. (Slovakia) Andrej Martin / (Chile) Hans Podlipnik (quarterfinals)
3. (United Kingdom) Ken Skupski / (United Kingdom) Neal Skupski (first round)
4. (Australia) Rameez Junaid / (Slovakia) Igor Zelenay (quarterfinals)

== Draw ==
Key

- Q = Qualifier
- WC = Wild card
- LL = Lucky loser
- Alt = Alternate
- ITF = ITF entry
- PR = Protected ranking
- SR = Special ranking
- SE = Special exempt
- JE = Junior exempt
- JR = Junior Accelerator Programme entrant
- CO = College Accelerator Programme entrant
- NG = Next Gen Accelerator Program entrant
- w/o = Walkover
- r = Retired
- d = Defaulted

First round
1	(Chile) J Peralta (Argentina) H Zeballos	6	7
WC	(Germany) A Beck (Germany) Y Maden	2	5
(Croatia) N Mektić (Croatia) A Šančić	6	3	[10]
LL	(Croatia) I Sabanov (Croatia) M Sabanov	3	6	[5]
3	(United Kingdom) K Skupski (United Kingdom) N Skupski	4	3
(El Salvador) M Arévalo (Croatia) F Škugor	6	6
(Argentina) A Molteni (Mexico) MÁ Reyes-Varela	6	3	[10]
(United States) R Harrison (New Zealand) M Venus	4	6	[6]
(Germany) F Moser (Germany) M Zverev	6^{4}	6^{8}
(Netherlands) S Arends (Austria) T-S Weissborn	7^{7}	7^{10}
(Poland) T Bednarek (Poland) M Kowalczyk	3	1
4	(Australia) R Junaid (Slovakia) I Zelenay	6	6
WC	(Germany) D Brown (Germany) O Otte	6	3	[10]
WC	(Germany) K Krawietz (Germany) S Stadler	3	6	[3]
(Germany) G Kretschmer (Germany) A Satschko	6	1	[8]
2	(Slovakia) A Martin (Chile) H Podlipnik	1	6	[10]

Quarterfinals
1	(Chile) J Peralta (Argentina) H Zeballos	6^{4}	6	[5]
(Croatia) N Mektić (Croatia) A Šančić	7^{7}	4	[10]
(El Salvador) M Arévalo (Croatia) F Škugor	3	2
(Argentina) A Molteni (Mexico) MÁ Reyes-Varela	6	6
(Netherlands) S Arends (Austria) T-S Weissborn	2	6	[11]
4	(Australia) R Junaid (Slovakia) I Zelenay	6	4	[9]
WC	(Germany) D Brown (Germany) O Otte	6	6
2	(Slovakia) A Martin (Chile) H Podlipnik	4	4

Semifinals
(Croatia) N Mektić (Croatia) A Šančić	6	6
(Argentina) A Molteni (Mexico) MÁ Reyes-Varela	2	2
(Netherlands) S Arends (Austria) T-S Weissborn	2	6	[10]
WC	(Germany) D Brown (Germany) O Otte	6	3	[5]

Final
(Croatia) N Mektić (Croatia) A Šančić	3	4
(Netherlands) S Arends (Austria) T-S Weissborn	6	6
