= 2019 Heilbronner Neckarcup =

- Date: 13–19 May
- Edition: 6th
- Draw: 48S / 16D
- Surface: Clay
- Location: Heilbronn, Germany

Champions

Singles
- (Serbia) Filip Krajinović

Doubles
- (Germany) Kevin Krawietz / (Germany) Andreas Mies
← 2018 ·	Heilbronner Neckarcup	· 2021 →

The 2019 Heilbronner Neckarcup was a professional tennis tournament played on clay courts. It was the sixth edition of the tournament which was part of the 2019 ATP Challenger Tour. It took place in Heilbronn, Germany between 13 and 19 May 2019.

== Singles main-draw entrants ==
=== Seeds ===
Country	Player	Rank^{1}	Seed
SRB	Filip Krajinović	74	1
USA	Tennys Sandgren	89	2
KAZ	Alexander Bublik	94	3
CZE	Jiří Veselý	100	4
UZB	Denis Istomin	103	5
BOL	Hugo Dellien	109	6
BRA	Thiago Monteiro	110	7
~~GER~~	~~Maximilian Marterer~~	~~112~~	~~8~~
SWE	Elias Ymer	113	9
GER	Yannick Maden	116	10
AUT	Dennis Novak	121	11
ESP	Guillermo García López	123	12
ITA	Stefano Travaglia	124	13
CAN	Peter Polansky	125	14
AUT	Sebastian Ofner	126	15
GER	Matthias Bachinger	130	16

- ^{1} Rankings are as of May 6, 2019.

=== Other entrants ===
The following players received wildcards into the singles main draw:

- (Germany) Daniel Altmaier
- (Serbia) Filip Krajinović
- (Germany) Yannick Maden
- (Germany) Cedrik-Marcel Stebe
- (Sweden) Elias Ymer

The following players received entry into the singles main draw using their ITF World Tennis Ranking:

- (Argentina) Hernán Casanova
- (France) Baptiste Crepatte
- (Germany) Peter Heller
- (Russia) Aslan Karatsev
- (France) Arthur Rinderknech

The following players received entry from the qualifying draw:

- (Hungary) Attila Balázs
- (Germany) Daniel Masur

The following players received entry as lucky losers:

- (Germany) Kevin Krawietz
- (Serbia) Viktor Troicki

== Champions ==
=== Singles ===
- (Serbia) Filip Krajinović def. (Belgium) Arthur De Greef 6–3, 6–1.

=== Doubles ===
- (Germany) Kevin Krawietz / (Germany) Andreas Mies def. (Germany) Andre Begemann / (France) Fabrice Martin 6–2, 6–4.
