= 2014 Heilbronner Neckarcup =

- Date: 12–18 May
- Edition: 1st
- Draw: 32S / 16D
- Prize money: €35,000+H
- Surface: Clay
- Location: Heilbronn, Germany

Champions

Singles
- (Germany) Jan-Lennard Struff

Doubles
- (Germany) Andre Begemann / (Germany) Tim Puetz
Heilbronner Neckarcup	· 2015 →

The 2014 Heilbronner Neckarcup was a professional tennis tournament played on clay courts. It was the first edition of the tournament which was part of the 2014 ATP Challenger Tour. It took place in Heilbronner, Germany between 12 and 18 May 2014.

== Singles main-draw entrants ==
=== Seeds ===
Country	Player	Rank^{1}	Seed
GER	Jan-Lennard Struff	73	1
GER	Dustin Brown	89	2
USA	Michael Russell	98	3
RUS	Andrey Kuznetsov	104	4
AUT	Andreas Haider-Maurer	105	5
~~GER~~	~~Julian Reister~~	~~112~~	~~6~~
SLO	Blaž Kavčič	121	7
CAN	Frank Dancevic	122	8
TUN	Marsel İlhan	145	9

- ^{1} Rankings are as of May 5, 2014.

=== Other entrants ===
The following players received wildcards into the singles main draw:

- (Germany) Nils Langer
- (United Kingdom) Kyle Edmund
- (Germany) Björn Phau
- (Germany) Alexander Zverev

The following player used protected ranking to gain entry into the singles main draw:

- (Colombia) Giovanni Lapentti

The following players received entry from the qualifying draw:

- (Brazil) André Ghem
- (Australia) Jason Kubler
- (Australia) Thanasi Kokkinakis
- (Belgium) Kimmer Coppejans

== Doubles main-draw entrants ==
=== Seeds ===
Country	Player	Country	Player	Rank^{1}	Seed
GER	Martin Emmrich	USA	Nicholas Monroe	100	1
SWE	Johan Brunström	FIN	Henri Kontinen	121	2
AUT	Julian Knowle	SVK	Michal Mertiňák	130	3
NED	Jesse Huta Galung	AUS	Rameez Junaid	148	4

- ^{1} Rankings are as of May 5, 2014.

=== Other entrants ===
The following pairs received wildcards into the doubles main draw:

- (Brazil) André Ghem / (Netherlands) Sander Groen
- (Germany) Kevin Krawietz / (Germany) Frank Moser
- (Australia) Thanasi Kokkinakis / (Germany) Alexander Zverev

== Champions ==
=== Singles ===
- (Germany) Jan-Lennard Struff def. (Hungary) Márton Fucsovics, 6–2, 7–6^{(7–5)}

=== Doubles ===
- (Germany) Andre Begemann / (Germany) Tim Puetz def. (Netherlands) Jesse Huta Galung / (Australia) Rameez Junaid, 6–3, 6–3
