= 2026 Neckarcup 2.0 =

- Date: 1–7 June
- Edition: 12th
- Surface: Clay
- Location: Bad Rappenau, Germany

Champions

Singles
- (United States) Emilio Nava

Doubles
- (Chinese Taipei) Jason Jung / (Japan) Kaito Uesugi
- Neckarcup 2.0

The 2026 Neckarcup 2.0 was a professional tennis tournament played on clay courts. It was the 12th edition of the tournament which was part of the 2026 ATP Challenger Tour. It took place in Bad Rappenau, Heilbronn district, Germany between 1 and 7 June 2026.

== Champions ==
=== Singles ===
- (United States) Emilio Nava def. (Croatia) Luka Mikrut via walkover.

=== Doubles ===
- (Chinese Taipei) Jason Jung / (Japan) Kaito Uesugi def. (Germany) Tim Rühl / (Netherlands) Mick Veldheer 7–6^{(7–4)}, 2–6, [12–10].

== Singles main-draw entrants ==
=== Seeds ===
Country	Player	Rank^{1}	Seed
ARG	Marco Trungelliti	81	1
USA	Emilio Nava	94	2
GBR	Jan Choinski	101	3
ESP	Pedro Martínez	140	4
BOL	Hugo Dellien	144	5
AUT	Joel Schwärzler	170	6
BEL	Gauthier Onclin	182	7
ARG	Alex Barrena	190	8

- ^{1} Rankings are as of 25 May 2026.

=== Other entrants ===
The following players received wildcards into the singles main draw:

- (Germany) Mika Petkovic
- (Germany) Max Hans Rehberg
- (Germany) Max Schönhaus

The following player received entry into the singles main draw as a special exempt:

- (Switzerland) ~~Kilian Feldbausch~~

The following player received entry into the singles main draw through the Next Gen Accelerator programme:

- (Germany) Diego Dedura

The following player received entry into the singles main draw as an alternate:

- (Germany) Henri Squire

The following players received entry from the qualifying draw:

- (Colombia) Daniel Elahi Galán
- (Netherlands) Sander Jong
- (Spain) Àlex Martí Pujolràs
- (Germany) Marvin Möller
- (Jordan) Abdullah Shelbayh
- (Germany) Max Wiskandt

The following player received entry as a lucky loser:

- (Australia) Marc Polmans
