= 2018 Heilbronner Neckarcup =

- Date: 14–20 May
- Edition: 5th
- Draw: 32S / 16D
- Surface: Clay
- Location: Heilbronn, Germany

Champions

Singles
- (Germany) Rudolf Molleker

Doubles
- (Australia) Rameez Junaid / (Netherlands) David Pel
← 2017 ·	Heilbronner Neckarcup	· 2019 →

The 2018 Heilbronner Neckarcup was a professional tennis tournament played on clay courts. It was the fifth edition of the tournament which was part of the 2018 ATP Challenger Tour. It took place in Heilbronn, Germany between 14 and 20 May 2018.

== Singles main-draw entrants ==
=== Seeds ===
Country	Player	Rank^{1}	Seed
AUS	John Millman	58	1
CZE	Jiří Veselý	80	2
GER	Yannick Maden	118	3
GER	Yannick Hanfmann	132	4
EST	Jürgen Zopp	135	5
SUI	Henri Laaksonen	145	6
RUS	Alexey Vatutin	146	7
SVK	Norbert Gombos	150	8

- ^{1} Rankings are as of May 7, 2018.

=== Other entrants ===
The following players received wildcards into the singles main draw:

- (Germany) Dominik Köpfer
- (Germany) Rudolf Molleker
- (Germany) Marvin Möller
- (Germany) Tim Pütz

The following players received entry from the qualifying draw:

- (Germany) Benjamin Hassan
- (Germany) Daniel Masur
- (Netherlands) Igor Sijsling
- (Spain) Bernabé Zapata Miralles

== Champions ==
=== Singles ===
- (Germany) Rudolf Molleker def. (Czech Republic) Jiří Veselý 4–6, 6–4, 7–5.

=== Doubles ===
- (Australia) Rameez Junaid / (Netherlands) David Pel def. (Germany) Kevin Krawietz / (Germany) Andreas Mies 6–2, 2–6, [10–7].
