= 2025 Heilbronner Neckarcup =

- Date: 2–8 June
- Edition: 11th
- Surface: Clay
- Location: Bad Rappenau, Germany

Champions

Singles
- (Peru) Ignacio Buse

Doubles
- (United States) Vasil Kirkov / (Netherlands) Bart Stevens
- Heilbronner Neckarcup

The 2025 Neckarcup 2.0 was a professional tennis tournament played on clay courts. It was the 11th edition of the tournament which was part of the 2025 ATP Challenger Tour. It took place in Bad Rappenau, Heilbronn district, Germany between 2 and 8 June 2025.

== Champions ==
=== Singles ===
- (Peru) Ignacio Buse def. (Netherlands) Guy den Ouden 7–5, 7–5.

=== Doubles ===
- (United States) Vasil Kirkov / (Netherlands) Bart Stevens def. (Germany) Jakob Schnaitter / (Germany) Mark Wallner 7–6^{(7–5)}, 4–6, [10–7].

== Singles main-draw entrants ==
=== Seeds ===
Country	Player	Rank^{1}	Seed
ITA	Luca Nardi	95	1
ESP	Pablo Carreño Busta	99	2
DEN	Elmer Møller	112	3
FRA	Valentin Royer	120	4
USA	Emilio Nava	137	5
ITA	Francesco Passaro	139	6
IND	Sumit Nagal	170	7
ITA	Andrea Pellegrino	173	8

- ^{1} Rankings are as of 26 May 2025.

=== Other entrants ===
The following players received wildcards into the singles main draw:

- (Germany) Diego Dedura
- (Germany) Justin Engel
- (Germany) Tom Gentzsch

The following players received entry from the qualifying draw:

- (Germany) Florian Broska
- ~~(Japan) Rei Sakamoto~~
- (Germany) Henri Squire
- (Germany) Marko Topo
- Alexey Vatutin
- (Germany) Max Wiskandt

The following player received entry as a lucky loser:

- (Italy) Francesco Maestrelli
