= 2016 Heilbronner Neckarcup =

- Date: 9–15 May
- Edition: 3rd
- Draw: 32S / 16D
- Prize money: €64,000+H
- Surface: Clay
- Location: Heilbronn, Germany

Champions

Singles
- (Georgia (country)) Nikoloz Basilashvili

Doubles
- (Netherlands) Sander Arends / (Austria) Tristan-Samuel Weissborn
- Heilbronner Neckarcup

The 2016 Heilbronner Neckarcup was a professional tennis tournament played on clay courts. It was the third edition of the tournament which was part of the 2016 ATP Challenger Tour. It took place in Heilbronn, Germany between 9 and 15 May 2016.

== Singles main-draw entrants ==
=== Seeds ===
Country	Player	Rank^{1}	Seed
LTU	Ričardas Berankis	55	1
ARG	Horacio Zeballos	91	2
ESP	Albert Montañés	100	3
ESP	Daniel Muñoz de la Nava	101	4
JPN	Yoshihito Nishioka	104	5
GER	Jan-Lennard Struff	107	6
GER	Dustin Brown	110	7
NED	Igor Sijsling	123	8

- ^{1} Rankings are as of May 2, 2016.

=== Other entrants ===
The following players received wildcards into the singles main draw:

- (Germany) Yannick Maden
- (Germany) Maximilian Marterer
- (Germany) Florian Mayer
- (Serbia) Janko Tipsarević

The following players received entry from the qualifying draw:

- (Germany) Andreas Beck
- (Germany) Kevin Krawietz
- (Switzerland) Henri Laaksonen
- (Germany) Peter Torebko

The following player received entry as a lucky loser:

- (Belgium) Yannik Reuter

== Champions ==
=== Singles ===
- (Georgia (country)) Nikoloz Basilashvili def. (Germany) Jan-Lennard Struff, 6–4, 7–6^{(7–3)}

=== Doubles ===
- (Netherlands) Sander Arends / (Austria) Tristan-Samuel Weissborn def. (Croatia) Nikola Mektić / (Croatia) Antonio Šančić, 6–3, 6–4
