= Alexander Ritschard =

Swiss tennis player

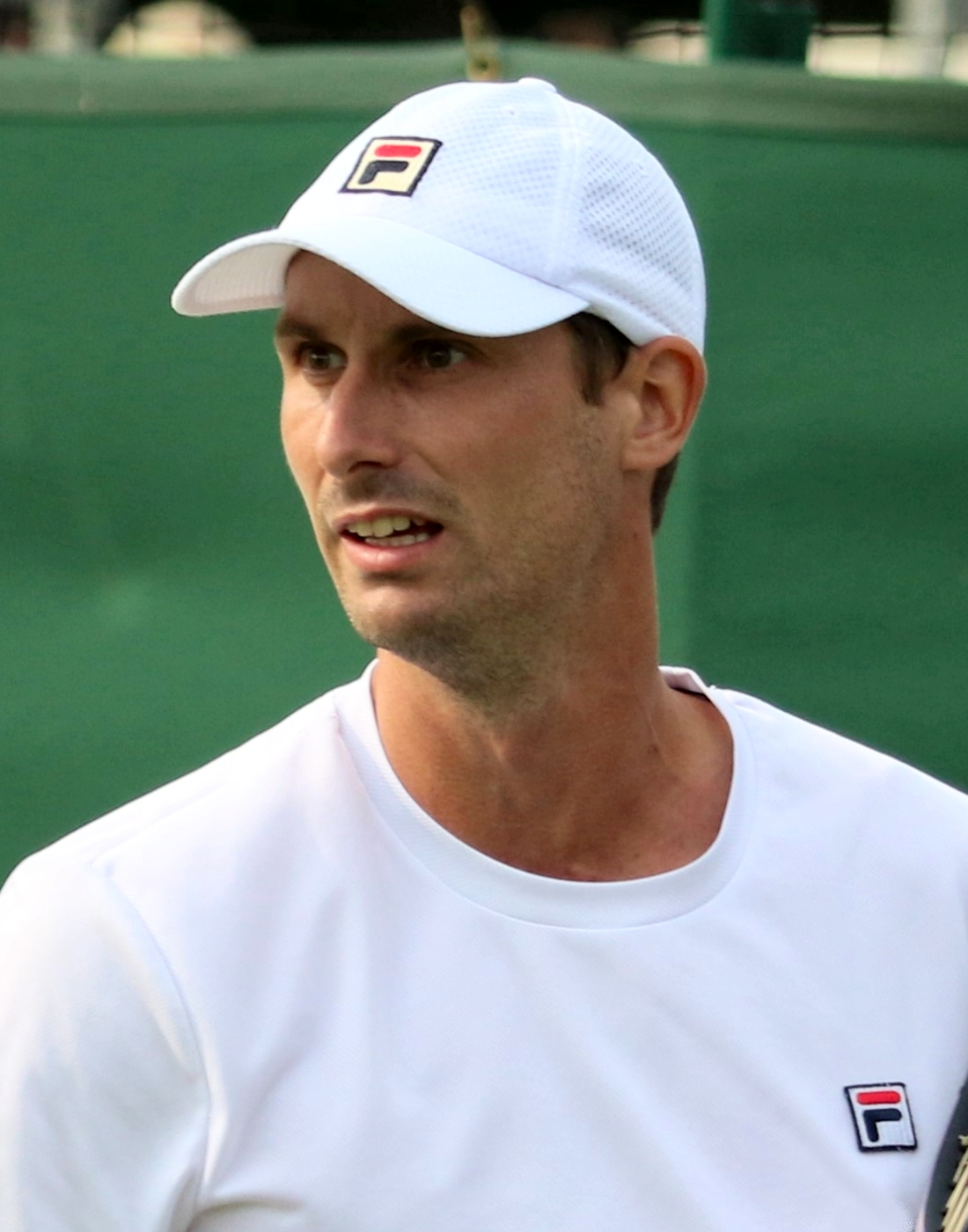
- Ritschard at the 2023 Wimbledon qualifying
- Country (sports): Switzerland (2010–2018; 2022–present); United States (2018–2022)
- Born: 24 March 1994 (age 32) Zürich, Switzerland
- Height: 1.93 m (6 ft 4 in)
- Turned pro: 2018
- Plays: Right-handed (two-handed backhand)
- College: Virginia
- Coach: Hans Ritschard, Juan Ramirez
- Prize money: US $940,292

Singles
- Career record: 4–8
- Career titles: 0
- Highest ranking: No. 99 (30 September 2024)
- Current ranking: No. 280 (26 October 2026)

Grand Slam singles results
- Australian Open: Q3 (2024)
- French Open: Q3 (2022, 2024)
- Wimbledon: 1R (2022)
- US Open: 1R (2022)

Doubles
- Career record: 0–1
- Career titles: 0
- Highest ranking: No. 388 (4 April 2022)
- Last updated on: 26 October 2026.

Alexander Ritschard (born March 24, 1994) is a Swiss-American professional tennis player. He has a career-high ATP singles ranking of world No. 99, achieved on 30 September 2024 and a doubles ranking of No. 388, achieved on 4 April 2022.

== Career ==
=== 2013: ATP Tour debut in doubles ===
Ritschard made his ATP Tour main-draw debut at the Suisse Open Gstaad in the doubles draw, partnering Alexander Sadecky.

=== 2022: ATP & Major debuts & first singles win ===
At the age of 28, he made his Grand Slam and ATP Tour debut in singles, after qualifying for the 2022 Wimbledon Championships. He drew fourth seeded Stefanos Tsitsipas who, despite his ranking, performed very poorly on grass, having lost in the first round of his two previous Wimbledon appearances. Ritschard stormed out to a 4–1 lead in the first set, on serve, looking like another possible upset but Tsitsipas rallied to win the set in a tiebreaker and the match in four sets.

At the Swiss Open, he won his maiden ATP Tour match defeating eighth seed Joao Sousa as a wildcard.

He made his debut at the US Open as a qualifier. In October, he won his maiden Challenger title in Hamburg defeating Henri Laaksonen, after the fellow Swiss retired in the second set when Ritschard was 7–5, 6–5 up and had 40–30 on his service game, climbing 50 positions back to No. 166 in the singles rankings on 24 October 2022.

=== 2023–2024: Three Challenger titles, top 100 ===
He qualified for the main draw of the 2023 BMW Open and defeated Jan-Lennard Struff but lost in the second round to Marcos Giron.

Ranked No. 194, he also qualified into the main draw of the 2024 US Clay Court Championships. In April, he returned to the top 175 with lifting his second trophy at the 2024 Savannah Challenger.

Following a Challenger final at the 2024 Heilbronner Neckarcup in June and a title at the 2024 Salzburg Open in July, he reached a new career-high of No. 135 on 29 July 2024.

Following a semifinal showing at the 2024 Copa Sevilla, he reached the top 125 at No. 121 in the singles rankings on 23 September 2024. A week later, after winning his third Challenger at the 2024 Lisboa Belém Open, he reached the top 100 at world No. 99 on 30 September 2025, at 30 years of age.

== Personal life ==
Ritschard attended the University of Virginia, graduating in 2017.

In April 2018, Ritschard started representing the United States. On 28 February 2022, he decided to once again represent Switzerland.

== Performance timeline ==
Key
W	F	SF	QF	#R	RR	Q#	DNQ	A	NH

(W) winner; (F) finalist; (SF) semifinalist; (QF) quarterfinalist; (#R) rounds 4, 3, 2, 1; (RR) round-robin stage; (Q#) qualification round; (DNQ) did not qualify; (A) absent; (NH) not held; (SR) strike rate (events won / competed); (W–L) win–loss record.

=== Singles ===
Tournament	2022	2023	2024	2025	SR	W–L	Win%
Grand Slam tournaments
Australian Open	A	Q1	Q3	A	0 / 0	0–0	–
French Open	Q3	Q1	Q3	A	0 / 0	0–0	–
Wimbledon	1R	Q1	Q2	A	0 / 1	0–1	0%
US Open	1R	Q1	Q1	A	0 / 1	0–1	0%
Win–loss	0–2	0–0	0–0	0–0	0 / 2	0–2	0%
ATP Masters 1000
Indian Wells Masters	A	A	A	A	0 / 0	0–0	–
Miami Open	A	A	A	Q1	0 / 0	0–0	–
Monte Carlo Masters	A	A	A	A	0 / 0	0–0	–
Madrid Open	A	A	A	Q1	0 / 0	0-0	–
Italian Open	A	A	A	A	0 / 0	0–0	–
Canadian Open	A	A	A	A	0 / 0	0–0	–
Cincinnati Masters	A	A	A	A	0 / 0	0–0	–
Shanghai Masters	NH	A	A	A	0 / 0	0–0	–
Paris Masters	A	A	A		0 / 0	0–0	–
Win–loss	0–0	0–0	0–0	0–0	0 / 0	0–0	–

== ATP Challenger Tour finals ==
=== Singles: 10 (5 titles, 5 runner-ups) ===
Legend ATP Challenger Tour (5–5)	Finals by surface Hard (1–1) Clay (4–4)

Result	W–L	Date	Tournament	Tier	Surface	Opponent	Score
Loss	0–1	Oct 2021	Naples, Italy	Challenger	Clay	(Netherlands) Tallon Griekspoor	3–6, 2–6
Loss	0–2	Feb 2022	Forlì V, Italy	Challenger	Hard (i)	(United Kingdom) Jack Draper	6–3, 3–6, 6–7^{(8–10)}
Win	1–2	Oct 2022	Hamburg, Germany	Challenger	Hard (i)	(Switzerland) Henri Laaksonen	7–5, 6–5 ret.
Loss	1–3	Jun 2023	Lyon, France	Challenger	Clay	(Brazil) Felipe Meligeni Alves	4–6, 6–0, 6–7^{(7–9)}
Win	2–3	Apr 2024	Savannah, USA	Challenger	Clay (green)	(Ecuador) Andrés Andrade	6–2, 6–4
Loss	2–4	Jun 2024	Heilbronn, Germany	Challenger	Clay	(India) Sumit Nagal	1–6, 7–6^{(7–5)}, 3–6
Win	3–4	Jul 2024	Salzburg, Austria	Challenger	Clay	(France) Kyrian Jacquet	6–4, 6–2
Win	4–4	Sep 2024	Lisbon, Portugal	Challenger	Clay	(Belgium) Raphaël Collignon	6–3, 6–7^{(3–7)}, 6–3
Loss	4–5	Aug 2025	Augsburg, Germany	Challenger	Clay	(Germany) Cedrik-Marcel Stebe	3–6, 3–6
Win	5–5	Oct 2026	Lisbon, Portugal	Challenger	Clay	Svyatoslav Gulin	6–2, 6–1

== ITF Futures/World Tennis Tour finals ==
=== Singles: 10 (7 titles, 3 runner-ups) ===
Legend ITF Futures/WTT (7–3)	Finals by surface Hard (1–1) Clay (6–2)

Result	W–L	Date	Tournament	Tier	Surface	Opponent	Score
Loss	0–1	Jun 2013	Germany F7, Roemerberg	Futures	Clay	(France) Pierre-Hugues Herbert	4–6, 4–6
Win	1–1	May 2018	Sweden F1, Karlskrona	Futures	Clay	(Slovenia) Mike Urbanija	6–2, 2–6, 6–1
Win	2–1	May 2018	Sweden F2, Kalmar	Futures	Clay	(Germany) Frederik Press	6–4, 6–3
Win	3–1	May 2018	Sweden F3, Lund	Futures	Clay	(France) Manuel Guinard	6–3, 6–3
Win	4–1	Mar 2019	M25 Calabasas, USA	WTT	Hard	(United States) Stefan Kozlov	6–2, 0–6, 7–6^{(7–5)}
Loss	4–2	Jan 2020	M25 Los Angeles, USA	WTT	Hard	(Argentina) Francisco Cerúndolo	3–6, 3–6
Win	5–2	Feb 2020	M25 Palm Coast, USA	WTT	Clay	(Latvia) Mārtiņš Podžus	7–6^{(9–7)}, 6–4
Loss	5–3	Aug 2026	M25 Santander, Spain	WTT	Clay	(Spain) Carlos Sánchez Jover	3–6, 0–4 ret.
Win	6–3	Aug 2026	M25 Oviedo, Spain	WTT	Clay	(Spain) Sergi Perez Contri	7–6^{(7–4)}, 7–6^{(7–4)}
Win	7–3	Oct 2026	M25 Zaragoza, Spain	WTT	Clay	(Spain) Alejandro Moro Cañas	6–3, 6–2
