= Emilio Nava =

American tennis player (born 2001)

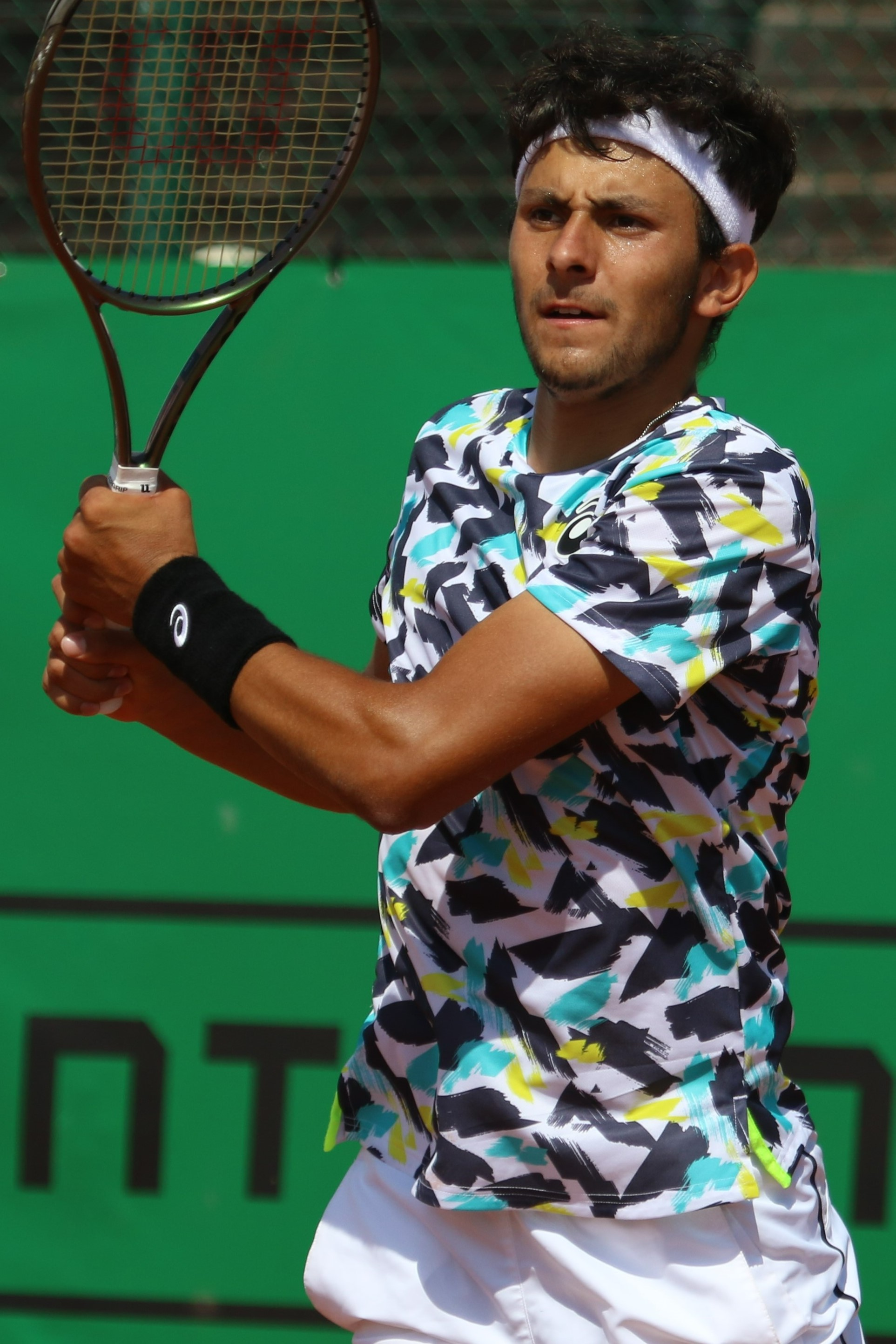
- Nava at the 2022 Internationaux de Tennis de Blois
- Country (sports): United States
- Residence: Los Angeles, California, US
- Born: December 2, 2001 (age 24) Woodland Hills, California, US
- Height: 6 ft 1 in (1.85 m)
- Turned pro: 2018
- Plays: Right-handed (two-handed backhand)
- Coach: Diego Cristin
- Prize money: US $2,190,536

Singles
- Career record: 15–34
- Career titles: 0
- Highest ranking: No. 74 (March 16, 2026)
- Current ranking: No. 111 (August 31, 2026)

Grand Slam singles results
- Australian Open: 2R (2026)
- French Open: 2R (2025)
- Wimbledon: 1R (2026)
- US Open: 2R (2022)

Doubles
- Career record: 5–5
- Career titles: 0
- Highest ranking: No. 187 (October 28, 2024)
- Current ranking: No. 644 (August 31, 2026)

Grand Slam doubles results
- US Open: 3R (2024)
- Last updated on: August 31, 2026.

Emilio Nava (born December 2, 2001) is an American professional tennis player. He has a career-high ATP singles ranking of No. 74 achieved on 16 March 2026 and a doubles ranking of No. 187 achieved on 28 October 2024.

== Early life ==
Nava is the son of Olympic sprinter Eduardo Nava and professional tennis player Maria Xóchitl Escobedo, both of whom are originally from Mexico. He is also the cousin of former professional tennis player Ernesto Escobedo. His brother, Eduardo Nava is also a professional tennis player who played college tennis at TCU and Wake Forest University.

== Professional career ==
=== 2019–2021: Major and Masters debuts ===
Nava reached two Grand Slam Boys' finals at the 2019 Australian Open and at the 2019 US Open.

Nava made his ATP main draw debut at the 2019 Abierto Mexicano Telcel after receiving a wildcard into the singles main draw. He lost to Mackenzie McDonald in the first round.

At the 2021 Miami Open, Nava qualified for the main draw to make his debut at ATP Masters 1000 level but lost in the first round to Lloyd Harris.

Nava made his Grand Slam debut at the 2021 US Open after being given a wildcard for the singles main draw. He lost to Lorenzo Musetti in the first round.

=== 2022: Major win & Challenger title, top 200 ===
At the 2022 Shymkent Challenger, Nava won his first Challenger title after defeating Sebastian Fanselow in the final.

At the US Open as a wildcard, he defeated John Millman in the first round for his first win at a Major event.

=== 2023: First Masters win ===
Ranked No. 182, he received a wildcard for the main draw of the 2023 Miami Open for a consecutive year, recording his first Masters 1000 win over John Isner in straight sets with two tiebreaks. He lost to Taylor Fritz in 58 minutes. He also received a wildcard first for the qualifying competition for the Masters in Madrid, which later was upgraded to a main draw wildcard. He made his main draw debut at the 2023 French Open as a qualifier, losing to Roberto Carballés Baena. He won the Challenger title in Modena and moved to a new career-high ranking of No. 168 on 3 July 2023. He also qualified for the 2023 US Open but lost to fifth seed and former US Open finalist Casper Ruud.

=== 2024–2026: Masters third rounds, top 75 ===
Nava qualified for the 2024 Dallas Open defeating compatriot Aidan Mayo and Marco Trungelliti in the qualifying competition, before losing to Michael Mmoh in the first round of the main draw. In doubles, at the same tournament, he reached the semifinals with Ben Shelton. He received a wildcard for the 2024 Delray Beach Open. He also qualified for the 2024 Los Cabos Open defeating wildcard Nicolás Mejía and again alternate player Aidan Mayo. He scored his third ATP win and second outside the Majors, over wildcard Diego Schwartzman.

At the 2024 BNP Paribas Open in Indian Wells, in the first qualifying round, he saved seven match points to defeat compatriot Steve Johnson in what was the last singles match of Johnson’s career. He lost to another compatriot Denis Kudla in the next round. At the next Masters, the 2024 Miami Open, he reached the main draw, after qualifying with wins over Quentin Halys and Yoshihito Nishioka, for a fourth consecutive year. As a result he reached the top 125 in the rankings on 1 April 2024.

In 2025, he won three Challenger titles in a row, at the 2025 Paraguay Open in Ascuncion, his fourth in Concepción, Chile and his fifth in Sarasota and returned to the top 150 on 15 April 2025. Nava and Borna Ćorić were the only players thus far with three Challenger trophies in 2025. He was just the second American to win three clay-court Challenger trophies in the same season after his good friend Tristan Boyer who accomplished the feat in 2024. Nava reached a fourth consecutive final in Tallahassee but lost to Chris Rodesch. He gained a wildcard entry into the 2025 French Open by winning the United States Tennis Association's Roland Garros Wild Card Challenge and recorded his first win at the tournament over Botic van de Zandschulp in straight sets. Nava lost to 10th seed Holger Rune in the second round.

He reached his first ATP quarterfinal at the 2025 Los Cabos Open where he defeated Aleksandar Vukic and sixth seed Bu Yunchaokete en route and secured a new career-high ranking in the top 120. At the 2025 National Bank Open Nava qualified for the main draw defeating Mitchell Krueger making his debut in Canada. He recorded his first wins at the tournament over Zizou Bergs and then lucky loser Térence Atmane to reach his first career Masters third round. As a result he moved into the top 110 in the singles rankings on 4 August 2025. Following making his top 100 debut on 15 September 2025, Nava won his fourth Challenger of the season at the 2025 Challenger de Villa María.

Ranked No. 116, Nava reached a second Masters third round at the 2026 Madrid Open, saving three match points against world No. 16 Valentin Vacherot,but lost to Arthur Fils. Ranked No. 97, Nava qualified for the main draw at the 2026 French Open. In June, he won his first ATP Challenger title of 2026 at the Neckarcup 2.0.

== Performance timeline ==
Key
W	F	SF	QF	#R	RR	Q#	DNQ	A	NH

(W) winner; (F) finalist; (SF) semifinalist; (QF) quarterfinalist; (#R) rounds 4, 3, 2, 1; (RR) round-robin stage; (Q#) qualification round; (DNQ) did not qualify; (A) absent; (NH) not held; (SR) strike rate (events won / competed); (W–L) win–loss record.
To avoid confusion and double counting, these charts are updated at the conclusion of a tournament or when the player's participation has ended.

Tournament	2018	2019	2020	2021	2022	2023	2024	2025	2026	SR	W–L	Win %
Grand Slam tournaments
Australian Open	A	A	A	A	A	Q3	Q3	Q1	2R	0 / 1	1–1	50%
French Open	A	A	A	A	A	1R	Q1	2R	1R	0 / 3	1–3	25%
Wimbledon	A	A	NH	A	A	A	Q2	Q2		0 / 0	0–0	–
US Open	A	A	A	1R	2R	1R	Q1	1R		0 / 4	1–4	20%
Win–loss	0–0	0–0	0–0	0–1	1–1	0–2	0–0	1–2	1–1	0 / 7	3–7	30%
ATP Masters 1000
Indian Wells Open	A	A	NH	A	Q1	Q2	Q2	A	1R	0 / 1	0–1	0%
Miami Open	A	A	NH	1R	1R	2R	1R	A	1R	0 / 5	1–5	17%
Monte-Carlo Masters	A	A	NH	A	A	A	A	A	1R	0 / 1	0–1	0%
Madrid Open	A	A	NH	A	A	1R	Q1	A	3R	0 / 2	2–2	50%
Italian Open	A	A	A	A	A	Q2	Q1	A	Q1	0 / 0	0–0	–
Canadian Open	A	A	NH	A	A	A	A	3R		0 / 1	2–1	67%
Cincinnati Open	A	A	A	A	Q1	A	A	2R		0 / 1	1–1	50%
Shanghai Masters	A	A	NH			A	A	A		0 / 0	0–0	–
Paris Masters	A	A	NH	A	A	A	A	A		0 / 0	0–0	–
Win–loss	0–0	0–0	0–0	0–1	0–1	1–2	0–1	3–2	2–4	0 / 11	6–11	35%
Career statistics
Tournaments	0	1	0	2	4	4	5	6	10	Total: 32		
Overall win–loss	0–0	0–1	0–0	0–2	1–4	1–4	1–5	6–6	6–10	0 / 32	15–32	32%
Year-end ranking	1366	944	665	323	178	147	212	88		$1,784,847		

== ATP Challenger and ITF Tour finals ==
=== Singles: 12 (8 titles, 4 runner-ups) ===
Legend ATP Challenger Tour (7–3) ITF WT Tour (1–1)	Finals by surface Hard (0–1) Clay (8–3)

Result	W–L	Date	Tournament	Tier	Surface	Opponent	Score
Win	1–0	May 2022	Shymkent Challenger, Kazakhstan	Challenger	Clay	(Germany) Sebastian Fanselow	6–4, 7–6^{(7–3)}
Win	2–0	Jun 2023	Modena Challenger, Italy	Challenger	Clay	(France) Titouan Droguet	6–7^{(5–7)}, 7–6^{(8–6)}, 6–4
Loss	2–1	Aug 2023	Golden Gate Open, US	Challenger	Hard	(France) Constant Lestienne	6–7^{(4–7)}, 2–6
Win	3–1	Mar 2025	Paraguay Open, Paraguay	Challenger	Clay	(Brazil) Thiago Monteiro	7–5, 6–3
Win	4–1	Mar 2025	Challenger Concepción, Chile	Challenger	Clay	(Argentina) Nicolás Kicker	6–1, 7–6^{(7–3)}
Win	5–1	Apr 2025	Sarasota Open, US	Challenger	Clay	(Canada) Liam Draxl	6–2, 7–6^{(7–2)}
Loss	5–2	Apr 2025	Tallahassee Tennis Challenger, US	Challenger	Clay	(Luxembourg) Chris Rodesch	6–4, 3–6, 4–6
Win	6–2	Sep 2025	Challenger de Villa María, Argentina	Challenger	Clay	(Argentina) Alex Barrena	6–3, 6–3
Loss	6–3	May 2026	Open de Oeiras II, Portugal	Challenger	Clay	(Serbia) Laslo Djere	3–6, 4–6
Win	7–3	Jun 2026	Neckarcup 2.0, Germany	Challenger	Clay	(Croatia) Luka Mikrut	walkover

Result	W–L	Date	Tournament	Tier	Surface	Opponent	Score
Win	1–0	Mar 2021	M15 La Nucia, Spain	WTT	Clay	(Spain) Nikolás Sánchez Izquierdo	7–6^{(10–8)}, 7–5
Loss	1–1	Apr 2021	M25 Reus, Spain	WTT	Clay	(France) Matteo Martineau	4–6, 6–2, 6–7^{(4–7)}

=== Doubles: 2 (1 title, 1 runner-up) ===
Legend ATP Challenger Tour (0–0) ITF WT Tour (1–1)	Finals by surface Hard (1–1) Clay (0–0)

Result	W–L	Date	Tournament	Tier	Surface	Partner	Opponents	Score
Win	1–1	Sep 2020	M15 Sintra, Portugal	WTT	Hard	(United States) Eduardo Nava	(Germany) Sebastian Fanselow (Germany) Maik Steiner	6–3, 6–4
Loss	1–1	Sep 2020	M15 Castelo Branco, Portugal	WTT	Hard	(United States) Eduardo Nava	(Brazil) Mateus Alves (Brazil) Igor Marcondes	6–7^{(4–7)}, 7–5, [8–10]

== Junior Grand Slam finals ==
=== Singles: 2 (2 runner-ups) ===
Result	Year	Tournament	Surface	Opponent	Score
Loss	2019	Australian Open	Hard	(Italy) Lorenzo Musetti	6–4, 2–6, 6–7^{(12–14)}
Loss	2019	US Open	Hard	(Czech Republic) Jonáš Forejtek	7–6^{(7–4)}, 0–6, 2–6

=== Doubles: 2 (2 runner-ups) ===
Result	Year	Tournament	Surface	Partner	Opponents	Score
Loss	2018	US Open	Hard	(United States) Axel Nefve	(Bulgaria) Adrian Andreev (United Kingdom) Anton Matusevich	2–6, 6–2, [8–10]
Loss	2019	Australian Open	Hard	(United States) Cannon Kingsley	(Czech Republic) Jonáš Forejtek (Czech Republic) Dalibor Svrčina	6–7^{(5–7)}, 4–6
