= Rudolf Molleker =

German tennis player

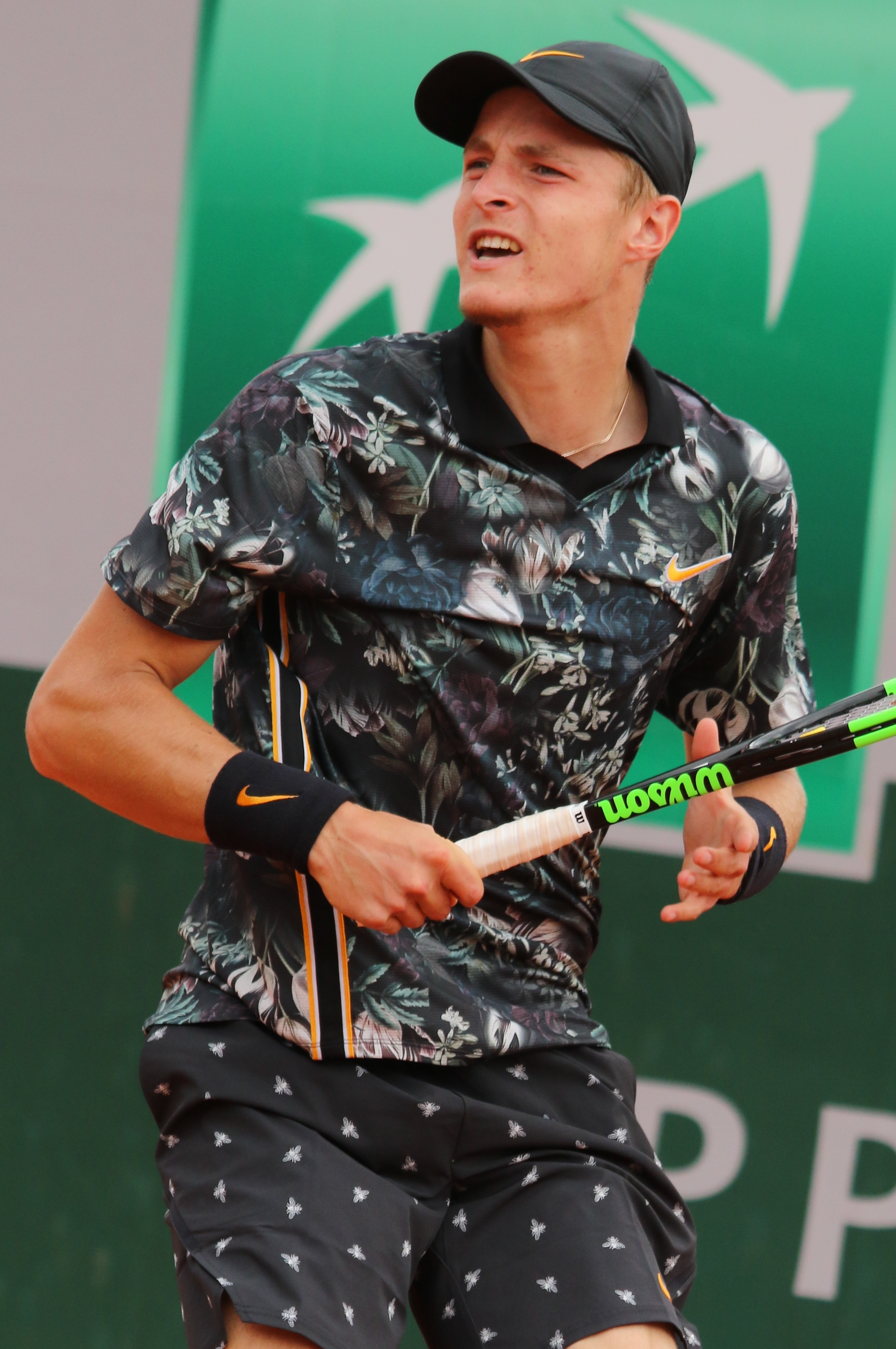
- Molleker at the 2019 French Open
- Country (sports): Germany
- Residence: Oranienburg, Germany
- Born: 26 October 2000 (age 25) Sievierodonetsk, Ukraine
- Height: 1.88 m (6 ft 2 in)
- Turned pro: 2017
- Plays: Right-handed (two-handed backhand)
- Coach: Benjamin Thiele
- Prize money: US $792,192

Singles
- Career record: 5–13
- Career titles: 0
- Highest ranking: No. 146 (29 July 2019)
- Current ranking: No. 522 (19 October 2026)

Grand Slam singles results
- Australian Open: 1R (2019)
- French Open: 1R (2019)
- Wimbledon: Q2 (2024)
- US Open: Q1 (2019, 2024)

Doubles
- Career record: 1–8
- Career titles: 0
- Highest ranking: No. 376 (21 March 2022)
- Last updated on: 19 October 2026.

Rudolf Molleker (born 26 October 2000) is a German tennis player. Molleker achieved a career high ATP singles ranking of world No. 146 on 29 July 2019 and a doubles ranking of world No. 376 on 21 March 2022.

== Personal information ==
He was born in Sieverodonetsk in Ukraine to Roman and Tanja Molleker and moved to Oranienburg in Germany when he was three years old. He is of Russian–German descent.

He trained at Mouratoglou Tennis Academy in Sophia Antipolis (France) starting in 2018.

== Career ==
=== 2017: ATP debut ===
Molleker made his ATP main draw debut at the German Open in Hamburg after defeating, in the qualifying rounds, Casper Ruud and Leonardo Mayer, who later won the tournament as a lucky loser.

=== 2018: First Challenger title & ATP and top-10 wins ===
Molleker won his first ATP Challenger Tour title as a wildcard at the Heilbronner Neckarcup, defeating Jiří Veselý in the final. He won his first match at ATP-level at the Stuttgart Open, defeating compatriot Jan-Lennard Struff in the first round. At the 2018 German Open in Hamburg, as a wildcard, he beat former world No. 3 David Ferrer in the first round.

=== 2019: Grand Slam and top 150 debut ===
Molleker made his Grand Slam debut at the 2019 Australian Open, battling through three qualifying rounds before falling to world No. 16 Diego Schwartzman in four sets.

At the 2019 BMW Open he recorded his third ATP win over Marius Copil as a wildcard. He also entered the doubles event with Andre Begemann as an alternate pair. At the 2019 French Open, he performed a similar feat to the Australian Open, twice coming back from a set down to qualify for the main draw. He again lost in four sets in the first round, this time to Alexander Bublik. He received a wildcard in singles and in doubles for the main draw of the 2019 Hamburg European Open. He defeated two-time Hamburg champion Leonardo Mayer to record his fourth ATP singles win.

=== 2021–2025: Out of top 400 ===
In 2021, he received a wildcard for the 2021 MercedesCup in Stuttgart, but lost to Marin Čilić. He received a wildcard in doubles at the 2021 Hamburg European Open partnering Daniel Altmaier. At the 2022 Hamburg European Open, having received a wildcard, he reached the second round of qualifying but lost to compatriot, 18-year-old and also a wildcard Marko Topo. He received a wildcard for the main draw at the 2023 Hamburg European Open but lost to compatriot and wildcard Maximilian Marterer. Ranked No. 179, he also received a wildcard for the main draw at the 2024 BMW Open, and defeated qualifier Francesco Passaro for his fifth ATP win.

== Singles performance timeline ==
Key
W	F	SF	QF	#R	RR	Q#	DNQ	A	NH

(W) winner; (F) finalist; (SF) semifinalist; (QF) quarterfinalist; (#R) rounds 4, 3, 2, 1; (RR) round-robin stage; (Q#) qualification round; (DNQ) did not qualify; (A) absent; (NH) not held; (SR) strike rate (events won / competed); (W–L) win–loss record.
To avoid confusion and double counting, these charts are updated at the conclusion of a tournament or when the player's participation has ended.

Current through the 2025 ATP Tour.

Tournament	2017	2018	2019	2020	2021	2022	2023	2024	2025	2026	SR	W–L	Win%
Grand Slam tournaments
Australian Open	A	A	1R	A	Q1	A	A	Q2	A	A	0 / 1	0–1	0%
French Open	A	A	1R	Q1	A	A	A	Q1	A		0 / 1	0–1	0%
Wimbledon	A	A	A	NH	A	A	A	Q2	A		0 / 0	0–0	–
US Open	A	A	Q1	A	A	A	A	Q1	A		0 / 0	0–0	–
Win–loss	0–0	0–0	0–2	0–0	0–0	0–0	0–0	0–0	0–0	0–0	0 / 2	0–2	0%
Career statistics
Tournaments	1	3	5	0	1	0	1	2	0	0	Career total: 13		
Overall win–loss	0–1	2–3	2–5	0–0	0–1	0–0	0–1	1–2	0–0	0–0	0 / 13	5–13	28%
Year-end ranking	566	207	164	217	379	333	201	268	397				

== ATP Challenger finals ==
=== Singles: 3 (2–1) ===
Finals by surface
Hard (0–0)
Clay (2–1)

Result	W–L	Date	Tournament	Surface	Opponent	Score
Win	1–0	May 2018	Heilbronn, Germany	Clay	(Czech Republic) Jiří Veselý	4–6, 6–4, 7–5
Loss	1–1	Jun 2019	Poznan, Poland	Clay	(Spain) Tommy Robredo	7–5, 4–6, 1–6
Win	2–1	Aug 2023	Prague, Czech Republic	Clay	(France) Gabriel Debru	6–2, 6–2

== ITF Futures/World Tennis Tour finals ==
=== Singles: 10 (5–5) ===
Finals by surface
Hard (0–1)
Clay (5–4)

Result	W–L	Date	Tournament	Surface	Opponent	Score
Loss	0–1	Sep 2017	Hammamet, Tunisia	Clay	(France) Elliot Benchetrit	4–6, 0–2 ret.
Loss	0–2	Apr 2018	Antalya, Turkey	Clay	(Croatia) Nino Serdarušić	5–7, 2–6
Loss	0–3	May 2022	M25 Split, Croatia	Clay	(Ukraine) Viacheslav Bielinskyi	2–6, 3–6
Win	1–3	Jun 2022	M15 Kamen, Germany	Clay	(Austria) David Pichler	6–1, 6–4
Win	2–3	Aug 2022	M25 Wetzlar, Germany	Clay	(Dominican Republic) Nick Hardt	7–6^{(7–3)}, 6–1
Win	3–3	Dec 2022	M15 Antalya, Turkey	Clay	(Bulgaria) Yanaki Milev	6–3, 6–4
Loss	3–4	Feb 2023	M15 Oberhaching, Germany	Hard (i)	(Germany) Daniel Masur	6–7^{(3–7)}, 6–7^{(4–7)}
Loss	3–5	Mar 2023	M25 Palma Nova, Spain	Clay	(Spain) Pablo Llamas Ruiz	3–6, 2–6
Win	4–5	May 2023	M25 Bodrum, Turkey	Clay	(United Kingdom) George Loffhagen	6–1, 7–6^{(7–4)}
Win	5–5	Jun 2025	M25 Bol, Croatia	Clay	(Portugal) Tiago Pereira	6–4, 6–7^{(5–7)}, 6–3

=== Doubles: 2 (2–0) ===
Finals by surface
Hard (0–0)
Clay (2–0)

Result	W–L	Date	Tournament	Surface	Partner	Opponents	Score
Win	1–0	Sep 2017	Tunisia F25, Hammamet	Clay	(France) Elliot Benchetrit	(Tunisia) Aziz Dougaz (Tunisia) Anis Ghorbel	7–5, 6–3
Win	2–0	Mar 2025	M25 Tarragona, Spain	Clay	(Austria) Sandro Kopp	(Belgium) Michael Geerts (Germany) Daniel Masur	7–5, 4–6, [10–8]

== Junior Grand Slam finals ==
=== Doubles: 1 (1 runner-up) ===
Result	Year	Tournament	Surface	Partner	Opponent	Score
Loss	2018	Australian Open	Hard	(Germany) Henri Squire	(France) Hugo Gaston (France) Clément Tabur	2–6, 2–6
