= Heilbronner Neckarcup =

Neckarcup 2.0
- 2026 Neckarcup 2.0

ATP Challenger Tour
- Event name: Neckarcup 2.0 Bad Rappenau
- Location: Bad Rappenau, Heilbronn district (2025-)
- Venue: Tennisclub (TC) Blau-Gelb Bad Rappenau (2025-), Tennisclub Heilbronn am Trappensee (2014-2024)
- Category: Challenger 100 (2019-2022, 2024-),Challenger 125 (2023)
- Surface: Clay
- Draw: 32S/24Q/16D
- Prize money: €145,250 (2025), 120,950+H
- Website: Website

The Neckarcup 2.0 is a tennis tournament held in Bad Rappenau, Germany. The event is part of the ATP Challenger Tour and is played on outdoor clay courts. It was the first tournament to debut Electronic Live Calling (ELC) on clay in 2024. It was previously held in Heilbronn from 2014 until 2024. In 2023 it was upgraded to a Challenger 125 for a year.

Filip Krajinović is the singles record holder with two titles won.

== Past finals ==
=== Singles ===
Year	Champions	Runners-up	Score
2026	(United States) Emilio Nava	(Croatia) Luka Mikrut	walkover
2025	(Peru) Ignacio Buse	(Netherlands) Guy den Ouden	7–5, 7–5
2024	(India) Sumit Nagal	(Switzerland) Alexander Ritschard	6–1, 6–7^{(5–7)}, 6–3
2023	(Italy) Matteo Arnaldi	(Argentina) Facundo Díaz Acosta	7–6^{(7–4)}, 6–1
2022	(Germany) Daniel Altmaier	(Slovakia) Andrej Martin	3–6, 6–1, 6–4
2021	(Spain) Bernabé Zapata Miralles	(Colombia) Daniel Elahi Galán	6–3, 6–4
2020	Not held due to the COVID-19 pandemic		
2019	(Serbia) Filip Krajinović (2)	(Belgium) Arthur De Greef	6–3, 6–1
2018	(Germany) Rudolf Molleker	(Czech Republic) Jiří Veselý	4–6, 6–4, 7–5
2017	(Serbia) Filip Krajinović (1)	(Slovakia) Norbert Gombos	6–3, 6–2
2016	(Georgia (country)) Nikoloz Basilashvili	(Germany) Jan-Lennard Struff	6–4, 7–6^{(7–3)}
2015	(Germany) Alexander Zverev	(Argentina) Guido Pella	6–1, 7–6^{(9–7)}
2014	(Germany) Jan-Lennard Struff	(Hungary) Márton Fucsovics	6–2, 7–6^{(7–5)}

=== Doubles ===
Year	Champions	Runners-up	Score
2026	(Chinese Taipei) Jason Jung (Japan) Kaito Uesugi	(Germany) Tim Rühl (Netherlands) Mick Veldheer	7–6^{(7–4)}, 2–6, [12–10]
2025	(United States) Vasil Kirkov (Netherlands) Bart Stevens	(Germany) Jakob Schnaitter (Germany) Mark Wallner	7–6^{(7–5)}, 4–6, [10–7]
2024	(Monaco) Romain Arneodo (France) Geoffrey Blancaneaux	(Germany) Jakob Schnaitter (Germany) Mark Wallner	7–6^{(7–5)}, 5–7, [10–3]
2023	(Germany) Constantin Frantzen (Germany) Hendrik Jebens	(Romania) Victor Vlad Cornea (Austria) Philipp Oswald	7–6^{(9–7)}, 6–4
2022	(Colombia) Nicolás Barrientos (Mexico) Miguel Ángel Reyes-Varela	(Netherlands) Jelle Sels (Netherlands) Bart Stevens	7–5, 6–3
2021	(United States) Nathaniel Lammons (United States) Jackson Withrow	(Sweden) André Göransson (Netherlands) Sem Verbeek	6–7^{(4–7)}, 6–4, [10–8]
2020	Not held due to the COVID-19 pandemic		
2019	(Germany) Kevin Krawietz (Germany) Andreas Mies	(Germany) Andre Begemann (France) Fabrice Martin	6–2, 6–4
2018	(Australia) Rameez Junaid (Netherlands) David Pel	(Germany) Kevin Krawietz (Germany) Andreas Mies	6–2, 2–6, [10–7]
2017	(Czech Republic) Roman Jebavý (Croatia) Antonio Šančić	(Canada) Adil Shamasdin (Slovakia) Igor Zelenay	6–4, 6–1
2016	(Netherlands) Sander Arends (Austria) Tristan-Samuel Weissborn	(Croatia) Nikola Mektić (Croatia) Antonio Šančić	6–3, 6–4
2015	(Poland) Mateusz Kowalczyk (Slovakia) Igor Zelenay	(Germany) Dominik Meffert (Germany) Tim Pütz	6–4, 6–3
2014	(Germany) Andre Begemann (Germany) Tim Puetz	(Netherlands) Jesse Huta Galung (Australia) Rameez Junaid	6–3, 6–3
