= 2019 Canberra Challenger – Singles =

Singles
- 2019 Canberra Challenger

Final
- Champion: (Poland) Hubert Hurkacz
- Runner-up: (Belarus) Ilya Ivashka
- Score: 6–4, 4–6, 6–2

Events
Singles	Doubles
- Canberra Challenger

Andreas Seppi was the defending champion but chose not to defend his title.

Hubert Hurkacz won the title after defeating Ilya Ivashka 6–4, 4–6, 6–2 in the final.

== Seeds ==
All seeds receive a bye into the second round.

1. (Spain) Roberto Carballés Baena (second round)
2. (Poland) Hubert Hurkacz (champion)
3. (Czech Republic) Jiří Veselý (semifinals)
4. (Belarus) Ilya Ivashka (final)
5. (Australia) Marc Polmans (second round)
6. (South Korea) Chung Yun-seong (second round)
7. (France) Elliot Benchetrit (quarterfinals)
8. (China) Li Zhe (third round)
9. (Bosnia and Herzegovina) Tomislav Brkić (third round)
10. (China) Wu Di (second round)
11. (France) Tristan Lamasine (quarterfinals)
12. (Australia) Bradley Mousley (quarterfinals)
13. (United States) Roy Smith (second round)
14. (Argentina) Renzo Olivo (semifinals)
15. (France) Tak Khunn Wang (third round)
16. (France) Hugo Grenier (third round)

== Draw ==
Key

- Q = Qualifier
- WC = Wild card
- LL = Lucky loser
- Alt = Alternate
- ITF = ITF entry
- PR = Protected ranking
- SR = Special ranking
- SE = Special exempt
- JE = Junior exempt
- JR = Junior Accelerator Programme entrant
- CO = College Accelerator Programme entrant
- NG = Next Gen Accelerator Program entrant
- w/o = Walkover
- r = Retired
- d = Defaulted

=== Finals ===
Quarterfinals
14	(Argentina) Renzo Olivo	6	3	6
ITF	(France) Sadio Doumbia	3	6	3
4	(Belarus) Ilya Ivashka	6	6
7	(France) Elliot Benchetrit	0	4
12/WC	(Australia) Bradley Mousley	6^{3}	3
3	(Czech Republic) Jiří Veselý	7^{7}	6
11	(France) Tristan Lamasine	6^{2}	4
2	(Poland) Hubert Hurkacz	7^{7}	6

Semifinals
14	(Argentina) Renzo Olivo	1	3
4	(Belarus) Ilya Ivashka	6	6
3	(Czech Republic) Jiří Veselý	3	1
2	(Poland) Hubert Hurkacz	6	6

Final
4	(Belarus) Ilya Ivashka	4	6	2
2	(Poland) Hubert Hurkacz	6	4	6

=== Top half ===
==== Section 1 ====
First round
(China) Y He	4	6	1
(Australia) H Bourchier	6	2	6
Alt	(Netherlands) S Verbeek	1	7^{9}	6
(China) X Gao	6	6^{7}	3
Q	(Australia) Lucas Vuradin	3	1
(France) H Nys	6	6
ITF	(France) S Doumbia	6	6
ITF	(Northern Mariana Islands) C Sinclair	3	4

Second round
1	(Spain) R Carballés Baena	6^{4}	6	3
(Australia) H Bourchier	7^{7}	1	6
Alt	(Netherlands) S Verbeek	6	4	6^{4}
14	(Argentina) R Olivo	4	6	7^{7}
9	(Bosnia and Herzegovina) T Brkić	6	4	7
(France) H Nys	2	6	5
ITF	(France) S Doumbia	6	6
5	(Australia) M Polmans	3	4

Third round
(Australia) H Bourchier	1	5
14	(Argentina) R Olivo	6	7
9	(Bosnia and Herzegovina) T Brkić	2	1
ITF	(France) S Doumbia	6	6

Quarterfinals
14	(Argentina) R Olivo	6	3	6
ITF	(France) S Doumbia	3	6	3

==== Section 2 ====
First round
Alt	(Australia) David Barclay	4	7^{9}	2
WC	(Australia) J Frawley	6	6^{7}	6
(Chile) MT Barrios Vera	6	6
(Australia) Jacob Grills	3	3
(Australia) A Harris	7	3	6
ITF	(Russia) A Zhurbin	5	6	3
(Australia) T Fancutt	6	6
(China) Xia Zihao	3	2

Second round
4	(Belarus) I Ivashka	4	6	7^{7}
WC	(Australia) J Frawley	6	1	6^{4}
(Chile) MT Barrios Vera	7^{7}	6
13	(United States) Roy Smith	6^{3}	3
10	(China) D Wu	4	5
(Australia) A Harris	6	7
(Australia) T Fancutt	6^{2}	6^{4}
7	(France) E Benchetrit	7^{7}	7^{7}

Third round
4	(Belarus) I Ivashka	6	6
(Chile) MT Barrios Vera	1	2
(Australia) A Harris	6^{3}	6^{5}
7	(France) E Benchetrit	7^{7}	7^{7}

Quarterfinals
4	(Belarus) I Ivashka	6	6
7	(France) E Benchetrit	0	4

=== Bottom half ===
==== Section 3 ====
First round
(United Kingdom) B Klein	6	6
(Australia) D Kelly	4	4
Alt	(France) M Chazal	6	6
WC	(Australia) A Addison	4	3
WC	(Australia) Tom Evans	3	2
(Germany) Tobias Simon	6	6
ITF	(Italy) M Bortolotti	6	6
WC	(Australia) Thomas Bosancic	2	2

Second round
6	(South Korea) Y-s Chung	6^{2}	7^{7}	0
(United Kingdom) B Klein	7^{7}	6^{5}	6
Alt	(France) M Chazal	7	6^{4}	6^{1}
12/WC	(Australia) B Mousley	5	7^{7}	7^{7}
16	(France) H Grenier	6	6^{6}	6
(Germany) T Simon	4	7^{8}	4
ITF	(Italy) M Bortolotti	3	3
3	(Czech Republic) J Veselý	6	6

Third round
(United Kingdom) B Klein	4	7^{13}	5
12/WC	(Australia) B Mousley	6	6^{11}	7
16	(France) H Grenier	5	2
3	(Czech Republic) J Veselý	7	6

Quarterfinals
12/WC	(Australia) B Mousley	6^{3}	3
3	(Czech Republic) J Veselý	7^{7}	6

==== Section 4 ====
First round
(Chinese Taipei) Lo Chien-hsun	5	2
(Switzerland) M-A Hüsler	7	6
(France) G Blancaneaux	4	3
(Australia) Michael Look	6	6
Alt	(Australia) M Romios	6	7^{7}
(Belgium) S Gillé	3	6^{0}
Q	(France) F Martin	3	6^{5}
(Chinese Taipei) C-h Tseng	6	7^{7}

Second round
8	(China) Z Li	6	7^{9}
(Switzerland) M-A Hüsler	2	6^{7}
(Australia) M Look	2	2
11	(France) T Lamasine	6	6
15	(France) TK Wang	7^{7}	6
Alt	(Australia) M Romios	6^{5}	0
(Chinese Taipei) C-h Tseng	4	4
2	(Poland) H Hurkacz	6	6

Third round
8	(China) Z Li	3	4
11	(France) T Lamasine	6	6
15	(France) TK Wang	6^{5}	4
2	(Poland) H Hurkacz	7^{7}	6

Quarterfinals
11	(France) T Lamasine	6^{2}	4
2	(Poland) H Hurkacz	7^{7}	6
