= 2017 Canberra Challenger – Singles =

Singles
- 2017 Canberra Challenger

Final
- Champion: (Israel) Dudi Sela
- Runner-up: (Germany) Jan-Lennard Struff
- Score: 3–6, 6–4, 6–3

Events
Singles	Doubles
- Canberra Challenger

Paolo Lorenzi was the defending champion but chose not to defend his title.

Dudi Sela won the title after defeating Jan-Lennard Struff 3–6, 6–4, 6–3 in the final.

== Seeds ==
1. (Germany) Jan-Lennard Struff (final)
2. (Austria) Gerald Melzer (second round)
3. (France) Pierre-Hugues Herbert (second round)
4. (Argentina) Renzo Olivo (second round)
5. (Russia) Konstantin Kravchuk (quarterfinals)
6. (Belgium) Steve Darcis (semifinals)
7. (Argentina) Carlos Berlocq (quarterfinals)
8. (Israel) Dudi Sela (champion)

== Draw ==
Key

- Q = Qualifier
- WC = Wild card
- LL = Lucky loser
- Alt = Alternate
- ITF = ITF entry
- PR = Protected ranking
- SR = Special ranking
- SE = Special exempt
- JE = Junior exempt
- JR = Junior Accelerator Programme entrant
- CO = College Accelerator Programme entrant
- NG = Next Gen Accelerator Program entrant
- w/o = Walkover
- r = Retired
- d = Defaulted

=== Finals ===
Semifinals
1	(Germany) Jan-Lennard Struff	7^{7}	6
6	(Belgium) Steve Darcis	6^{5}	3
(Colombia) Alejandro Falla	4	6	1
8	(Israel) Dudi Sela	6	2	6

Final
1	(Germany) Jan-Lennard Struff	6	4	3
8	(Israel) Dudi Sela	3	6	6

=== Top half ===
First round
1	(Germany) J-L Struff	6	6
WC	(Australia) B Walkin	4	4
WC	(Australia) A Harris	7^{7}	6
(Australia) T Fancutt	6^{3}	4
Q	(Australia) J Frawley	7^{7}	2	2
(Australia) A Vukic	6^{4}	6	6
Q	(United States) N Pasha	6^{5}	3
5	(Russia) K Kravchuk	7^{7}	6
3	(France) P-H Herbert	7^{7}	6
WC	(Australia) A Popyrin	6^{2}	4
Q	(Japan) Yu Watanuki	7^{9}	4	4
(Canada) D Shapovalov	6^{7}	6	6
(Chile) H Podlipnik	6	6
WC	(Australia) C Puttergill	3	3
(France) C Moutet	1	1
6	(Belgium) S Darcis	6	6

Second round
1	(Germany) J-L Struff	6	3	6
WC	(Australia) A Harris	1	6	4
(Australia) A Vukic	4	6^{1}
5	(Russia) K Kravchuk	6	7^{7}
3	(France) P-H Herbert	6	4	4
(Canada) D Shapovalov	3	6	6
(Chile) H Podlipnik	2	4
6	(Belgium) S Darcis	6	6

Quarterfinals
1	(Germany) J-L Struff	6	6^{6}	6
5	(Russia) K Kravchuk	4	7^{8}	3
(Canada) D Shapovalov	0	6^{4}
6	(Belgium) S Darcis	6	7^{7}

Semifinals
1	(Germany) J-L Struff	7^{7}	6
6	(Belgium) S Darcis	6^{5}	3

=== Bottom half ===
First round
7	(Argentina) C Berlocq	6	6
(Australia) S de Waard	3	3
(Moldova) R Albot	1	4
(France) Q Halys	6	6
(Australia) D Kelly	6^{6}	2
(Colombia) A Falla	7^{8}	6
LL	(Australia) J Delaney	2	7	5
4	(Argentina) R Olivo	6	5	7
8	(Israel) D Sela	6	6
Q	(Switzerland) L Margaroli	1	1
(Germany) M Moraing	6	6
(Argentina) A Molteni	4	0
(India) VS Prashanth	7^{7}	6^{8}	3
(Australia) S Groth	6^{1}	7^{10}	6
(Australia) Daniel Nolan	6	5	6^{6}
2	(Austria) G Melzer	4	7	7^{8}

Second round
7	(Argentina) C Berlocq	7^{8}	6^{0}	6
(France) Q Halys	6^{6}	7^{7}	4
(Colombia) A Falla	6	6^{4}	7^{7}
4	(Argentina) R Olivo	1	7^{7}	6^{3}
8	(Israel) D Sela	6	6
(Germany) M Moraing	3	2
(Australia) S Groth	4	6	7^{7}
2	(Austria) G Melzer	6	4	6^{2}

Quarterfinals
7	(Argentina) C Berlocq	2	5
(Colombia) A Falla	6	7
8	(Israel) D Sela	7^{7}	6
(Australia) S Groth	6^{5}	2

Semifinals
(Colombia) A Falla	4	6	1
8	(Israel) D Sela	6	2	6
