= 2018 Canberra Challenger – Doubles =

Doubles
- 2018 Canberra Challenger

Final
- Champions: (Israel) Jonathan Erlich (India) Divij Sharan
- Runners-up: (Chile) Hans Podlipnik-Castillo (Belarus) Andrei Vasilevski
- Score: 7–6^{(7–1)}, 6–2

Events
Singles	Doubles
- Canberra Challenger

Andre Begemann and Jan-Lennard Struff were the defending champions but chose not to defend their title.

Jonathan Erlich and Divij Sharan won the title after defeating Hans Podlipnik-Castillo and Andrei Vasilevski 7–6^{(7–1)}, 6–2 in the final.

== Seeds ==
1. (Chile) Hans Podlipnik-Castillo / (Belarus) Andrei Vasilevski (final)
2. (Israel) Jonathan Erlich / (India) Divij Sharan (champions)
3. (Canada) Adil Shamasdin / (United Kingdom) Neal Skupski (first round)
4. (Australia) Steven de Waard / (Japan) Ben McLachlan (semifinals)

== Draw ==
Key

- Q = Qualifier
- WC = Wild card
- LL = Lucky loser
- Alt = Alternate
- ITF = ITF entry
- PR = Protected ranking
- SR = Special ranking
- SE = Special exempt
- JE = Junior exempt
- JR = Junior Accelerator Programme entrant
- CO = College Accelerator Programme entrant
- NG = Next Gen Accelerator Program entrant
- w/o = Walkover
- r = Retired
- d = Defaulted

First round
1	(Chile) H Podlipnik-Castillo (Belarus) A Vasilevski	7^{11}	6
(France) E Benchetrit (France) G Blancaneaux	6^{9}	3
(France) H Grenier (France) M Janvier	7^{7}	6
(United States) N Lammons (United States) A Lawson	6^{3}	4
4	(Australia) S de Waard (Japan) B McLachlan	6	6
(Australia) D Propoggia (Australia) S Puodziunas	4	2
WC	(Australia) Alexander Crnokrak (Australia) M Romios	5	0
(Australia) Jarryd Chaplin (Australia) L Saville	7	6
(United States) S Bangoura (United States) N Pasha	w/o
(France) H Nys (Germany) T Pütz
(China) Z Li (Japan) Yo Watanuki	4	7^{7}	[10]
3	(Canada) A Shamasdin (United Kingdom) N Skupski	6	6^{5}	[7]
(Italy) A Seppi (Australia) Gavin van Peperzeel	w/o
WC	(Australia) H Bourchier (Australia) A Harris
WC	(Australia) J Beale (Australia) T Fancutt	3	1
2	(Israel) J Erlich (India) D Sharan	6	6

Quarterfinals
1	(Chile) H Podlipnik-Castillo (Belarus) A Vasilevski	2
(France) H Grenier (France) M Janvier	1^{r}
4	(Australia) S de Waard (Japan) B McLachlan	6	7^{7}
(Australia) J Chaplin (Australia) L Saville	4	6^{4}
(United States) S Bangoura (United States) N Pasha	6	4	[10]
(China) Z Li (Japan) Yo Watanuki	4	6	[12]
(Italy) A Seppi (Australia) G van Peperzeel	4	3
2	(Israel) J Erlich (India) D Sharan	6	6

Semifinals
1	(Chile) H Podlipnik-Castillo (Belarus) A Vasilevski	6	7^{7}
4	(Australia) S de Waard (Japan) B McLachlan	4	6^{5}
(China) Z Li (Japan) Yo Watanuki	4	7^{7}	[4]
2	(Israel) J Erlich (India) D Sharan	6	6^{5}	[10]

Final
1	(Chile) H Podlipnik-Castillo (Belarus) A Vasilevski	6^{1}	2
2	(Israel) J Erlich (India) D Sharan	7^{7}	6
