= 2017 Canberra Challenger – Doubles =

Doubles
- 2017 Canberra Challenger

Final
- Champions: (Germany) Andre Begemann (Germany) Jan-Lennard Struff
- Runners-up: (Argentina) Carlos Berlocq (Argentina) Andrés Molteni
- Score: 6–3, 6–4

Events
Singles	Doubles
- Canberra Challenger

Mariusz Fyrstenberg and Santiago González were the defending champions but chose not to defend their title.

Andre Begemann and Jan-Lennard Struff won the title after defeating Carlos Berlocq and Andrés Molteni 6–3, 6–4 in the final.

== Seeds ==
1. (United States) James Cerretani / (Austria) Philipp Oswald (quarterfinals)
2. (Chile) Hans Podlipnik / (United States) Max Schnur (semifinals)
3. (Germany) Andre Begemann / (Germany) Jan-Lennard Struff (champions)
4. (Switzerland) Luca Margaroli / (Japan) Toshihide Matsui (first round)

== Draw ==
Key

- Q = Qualifier
- WC = Wild card
- LL = Lucky loser
- Alt = Alternate
- ITF = ITF entry
- PR = Protected ranking
- SR = Special ranking
- SE = Special exempt
- JE = Junior exempt
- JR = Junior Accelerator Programme entrant
- CO = College Accelerator Programme entrant
- NG = Next Gen Accelerator Program entrant
- w/o = Walkover
- r = Retired
- d = Defaulted

First round
1	(United States) J Cerretani (Austria) P Oswald	6^{6}	6	[10]
(Austria) G Melzer (Germany) M Moraing	7^{8}	3	[4]
WC	(Australia) R Hijikata (Australia) Benard Bruno Nkomba	0	6	[3]
(Argentina) C Berlocq (Argentina) A Molteni	6	3	[10]
4	(Switzerland) L Margaroli (Japan) T Matsui	4	5
(Australia) S de Waard (New Zealand) B McLachlan	6	7
(United States) N Pasha (Australia) B Walkin	4	6	[10]
(Australia) Daniel Nolan (Australia) C Puttergill	6	3	[8]
(Australia) T Fancutt (Australia) J Frawley	3	5
(France) C Moutet (India) VS Prashanth	6	7
(Australia) D Kelly (Australia) S Puodziunas	6^{2}	7^{7}	[8]
3	(Germany) A Begemann (Germany) J-L Struff	7^{7}	6^{5}	[10]
WC	(Australia) Dimitri Morogiannis (Australia) Jarred Wynan	6	3	[10]
(Australia) J Delaney (Japan) Yu Watanuki	1	6	[12]
WC	(Australia) A Popyrin (Australia) Anthony Popyrin	4	7^{7}	[5]
2	(Chile) H Podlipnik (United States) M Schnur	6	6^{5}	[10]

Quarterfinals
1	(United States) J Cerretani (Austria) P Oswald	3	2
(Argentina) C Berlocq (Argentina) A Molteni	6	6
(Australia) S de Waard (New Zealand) B McLachlan	7^{7}	7^{7}
(United States) N Pasha (Australia) B Walkin	6^{4}	6^{5}
(France) C Moutet (India) VS Prashanth	2	7	[5]
3	(Germany) A Begemann (Germany) J-L Struff	6	5	[10]
(Australia) J Delaney (Japan) Yu Watanuki	0^{r}
2	(Chile) H Podlipnik (United States) M Schnur	3

Semifinals
(Argentina) C Berlocq (Argentina) A Molteni	6	1	[10]
(Australia) S de Waard (New Zealand) B McLachlan	4	6	[8]
3	(Germany) A Begemann (Germany) J-L Struff	7^{7}	6
2	(Chile) H Podlipnik (United States) M Schnur	6^{4}	3

Final
(Argentina) C Berlocq (Argentina) A Molteni	3	4
3	(Germany) A Begemann (Germany) J-L Struff	6	6
