= 2018 Canberra Challenger =

- Date: 8–13 January 2018
- Edition: 3rd
- Category: ATP Challenger Tour
- Draw: 32S / 16D
- Surface: Hard
- Location: Canberra, Australia

Champions

Singles
- (Italy) Andreas Seppi

Doubles
- (Israel) Jonathan Erlich / (India) Divij Sharan
← 2017 ·	Canberra Challenger	· 2019 →

The 2018 Canberra Challenger was a professional tennis tournament played on outdoor hard courts. It was the third edition of the tournament which was a part of the 2018 ATP Challenger Tour. It took place in Canberra, Australia between 8 and 13 January 2018.

== Singles main-draw entrants ==
=== Seeds ===
Country	Player	Rank^{1}	Seed
ISR	Dudi Sela	67	1
GER	Florian Mayer	69	2
ESP	Guillermo García López	70	3
KAZ	Mikhail Kukushkin	74	4
DOM	Víctor Estrella Burgos	83	5
HUN	Márton Fucsovics	85	6
ITA	Andreas Seppi	86	7
SRB	Laslo Đere	88	8

- ^{1} Rankings are as of January 1, 2017.

=== Other entrants ===
The following players received wildcards into the singles main draw:

- (Australia) Alexander Crnokrak
- (Australia) Benjamin Mitchell
- (Australia) Dane Propoggia
- (Australia) Gavin van Peperzeel

The following players received entry from the qualifying draw:

- (Australia) Jeremy Beale
- (Australia) Harry Bourchier
- (Australia) Thomas Fancutt
- (United States) Nathan Pasha

== Champions ==
=== Singles ===
- (Italy) Andreas Seppi def. (Hungary) Márton Fucsovics 5–7, 6–4, 6–3.

=== Doubles ===
- (Israel) Jonathan Erlich / (India) Divij Sharan def. (Chile) Hans Podlipnik Castillo / (Belarus) Andrei Vasilevski 7–6^{(7–1)}, 6–2.
