= 2020 Canberra Challenger – Doubles =

Doubles
- 2020 Canberra Challenger

Final
- Champions: (Australia) Max Purcell (Australia) Luke Saville
- Runners-up: (Israel) Jonathan Erlich (Belarus) Andrei Vasilevski
- Score: 7–6^{(7–3)}, 7–6^{(7–3)}

Events
Singles	Doubles
← 2019 ·	Canberra Challenger	· 2021 →

Marcelo Demoliner and Hugo Nys were the defending champions but chose not to defend their title.

Max Purcell and Luke Saville won the title after defeating Jonathan Erlich and Andrei Vasilevski 7–6^{(7–3)}, 7–6^{(7–3)} in the final.

== Seeds ==
1. (El Salvador) Marcelo Arévalo / (United Kingdom) Jonny O'Mara (first round)
2. (Netherlands) Sander Arends / (Chinese Taipei) Hsieh Cheng-peng (semifinals)
3. (Israel) Jonathan Erlich / (Belarus) Andrei Vasilevski (final)
4. (United States) Nicholas Monroe / (United States) Jackson Withrow (quarterfinals)

== Draw ==
=== Key ===
- Q = Qualifier
- WC = Wild card
- LL = Lucky loser
- Alt = Alternate
- SE = Special exempt
- PR = Protected ranking
- ITF = ITF entry
- JE = Junior exempt
- w/o = Walkover
- r = Retired
- d = Defaulted
- SR = Special ranking

First round
1	(El Salvador) M Arévalo (United Kingdom) J O'Mara	7^{7}	5	[4]
(United States) M Giron (United States) B Klahn	6^{2}	7	[10]
WC	(Australia) A Harris (Australia) A Santillan	6^{6}	2
(Australia) M Ebden (Sweden) R Lindstedt	7^{8}	6
3	(Israel) J Erlich (Belarus) A Vasilevski	4	6	[10]
(Germany) D Koepfer (South Korea) S-w Kwon	6	1	[8]
(Romania) M Copil (Ukraine) D Molchanov	6	6^{6}	[10]
(Spain) J Munar (Finland) E Ruusuvuori	4	7^{8}	[3]
(Spain) G Granollers (Spain) D Vega Hernández	5	3
(Australia) M Purcell (Australia) L Saville	7	6
(Australia) M Reid (Australia) J-P Smith	6^{2}	4
4	(United States) N Monroe (United States) J Withrow	7^{7}	6
WC	(Australia) H Bourchier (Australia) Jacob Grills	2	2
WC	(Australia) M Polmans (Australia) S Puodziunas	6	6
Alt	(China) Z Li (China) Zh Zhang	3	6^{4}
2	(Netherlands) S Arends (Chinese Taipei) C-p Hsieh	6	7^{7}

Quarterfinals
(United States) M Giron (United States) B Klahn	5	6^{3}
(Australia) M Ebden (Sweden) R Lindstedt	7	7^{7}
3	(Israel) J Erlich (Belarus) A Vasilevski	7^{7}	6
(Romania) M Copil (Ukraine) D Molchanov	6^{3}	3
(Australia) M Purcell (Australia) L Saville	7	6
4	(United States) N Monroe (United States) J Withrow	5	3
WC	(Australia) M Polmans (Australia) S Puodziunas	4	4
2	(Netherlands) S Arends (Chinese Taipei) C-p Hsieh	6	6

Semifinals
(Australia) M Ebden (Sweden) R Lindstedt	7^{12}	4	[10]
3	(Israel) J Erlich (Belarus) A Vasilevski	6^{10}	6	[12]
(Australia) M Purcell (Australia) L Saville	1	6	[10]
2	(Netherlands) S Arends (Chinese Taipei) C-p Hsieh	6	2	[7]

Final
3	(Israel) J Erlich (Belarus) A Vasilevski	6^{3}	6^{3}
(Australia) M Purcell (Australia) L Saville	7^{7}	7^{7}
