= 2020 Canberra Challenger =

- Date: 6–12 January 2020
- Edition: 5th
- Category: ATP Challenger Tour
- Draw: 48S / 16D
- Surface: Hard
- Location: Bendigo, Australia

Champions

Singles
- (Germany) Philipp Kohlschreiber

Doubles
- (Australia) Max Purcell / (Australia) Luke Saville
- Canberra Challenger

The 2020 Apis Canberra International was a professional tennis tournament that was played on outdoor hard courts. It was the fifth edition of the tournament which was a part of the 2020 ATP Challenger Tour. It took place in Bendigo, Australia between 6 and 12 January 2020. The tournament was relocated to Bendigo due to the hazardous air quality in Canberra from the 2019–20 Australian bushfire season.

== Singles main-draw entrants ==
=== Seeds ===
Country	Player	Rank^{1}	Seed
FRA	Ugo Humbert	57	1
ITA	Andreas Seppi	72	2
ITA	Jannik Sinner	78	3
GER	Philipp Kohlschreiber	79	4
USA	Steve Johnson	85	5
ESP	Jaume Munar	86	6
KOR	Kwon Soon-woo	88	7
GER	Dominik Koepfer	94	8
USA	Marcos Giron	102	9
SUI	Henri Laaksonen	104	10
CAN	Brayden Schnur	106	11
SVK	Norbert Gombos	109	12
JPN	Taro Daniel	110	13
RUS	Evgeny Donskoy	112	14
USA	Denis Kudla	113	15
GER	Peter Gojowczyk	117	16

- ^{1} Rankings are as of December 30, 2019.

=== Other entrants ===
The following players received wildcards into the singles main draw:

- (Australia) Matthew Ebden
- (Australia) Jason Kubler
- (Australia) Max Purcell
- (Australia) Akira Santillan
- (Australia) Aleksandar Vukic

The following players received entry from the qualifying draw:

- (Australia) Harry Bourchier
- (Colombia) Daniel Elahi Galán

The following player received entry as a lucky loser:

- (China) Li Zhe

== Champions ==
=== Singles ===
- (Germany) Philipp Kohlschreiber def. (Finland) Emil Ruusuvuori 7–6^{(7–5)}, 4–6, 6–3.

=== Doubles ===
- (Australia) Max Purcell / (Australia) Luke Saville def. (Israel) Jonathan Erlich / (Belarus) Andrei Vasilevski 7–6^{(7–3)}, 7–6^{(7–3)}.
