= 2018 Canberra Challenger – Singles =

Singles
- 2018 Canberra Challenger

Final
- Champion: (Italy) Andreas Seppi
- Runner-up: (Hungary) Márton Fucsovics
- Score: 5–7, 6–4, 6–3

Events
Singles	Doubles
- Canberra Challenger

Dudi Sela was the defending champion but lost in the first round to Hugo Grenier.

Andreas Seppi won the title after defeating Márton Fucsovics 5–7, 6–4, 6–3 in the final.

== Seeds ==
1. (Israel) Dudi Sela (first round)
2. (Germany) Florian Mayer (quarterfinals)
3. (Spain) Guillermo García López (quarterfinals)
4. (Kazakhstan) Mikhail Kukushkin (first round, retired)
5. (Dominican Republic) Víctor Estrella Burgos (semifinals)
6. (Hungary) Márton Fucsovics (final)
7. (Italy) Andreas Seppi (champion)
8. (Serbia) Laslo Đere (first round)

== Draw ==
Key

- Q = Qualifier
- WC = Wild card
- LL = Lucky loser
- Alt = Alternate
- ITF = ITF entry
- PR = Protected ranking
- SR = Special ranking
- SE = Special exempt
- JE = Junior exempt
- JR = Junior Accelerator Programme entrant
- CO = College Accelerator Programme entrant
- NG = Next Gen Accelerator Program entrant
- w/o = Walkover
- r = Retired
- d = Defaulted

=== Finals ===
Semifinals
6	(Hungary) Márton Fucsovics	6	4	6
(France) Maxime Janvier	3	6	2
7	(Italy) Andreas Seppi	6	6
5	(Dominican Republic) Víctor Estrella Burgos	2	2

Final
6	(Hungary) Márton Fucsovics	7	4	3
7	(Italy) Andreas Seppi	5	6	6

=== Top half ===
First round
1	(Israel) D Sela	6^{6}	1
(France) H Grenier	7^{8}	6
(Australia) A Harris	6	6
WC	(Australia) Gavin van Peperzeel	2	1
Q	(Australia) H Bourchier	2	4
(China) Z Li	6	6
(Tunisia) M Jaziri	2	1^{r}
6	(Hungary) M Fucsovics	6	5
4	(Kazakhstan) M Kukushkin	6^{2}	0^{r}
Q	(Australia) J Beale	7^{7}	0
(Argentina) N Kicker	4	5
(France) E Benchetrit	6	7
(Chile) N Jarry	7^{7}	6
(France) C Moutet	6^{4}	3
(France) M Janvier	3	7	6
8	(Serbia) L Đere	6	5	2

Second round
(France) H Grenier	7	3	7^{7}
(Australia) A Harris	5	6	6^{3}
(China) Z Li	1	2
6	(Hungary) M Fucsovics	6	6
Q	(Australia) J Beale	7	3	4
(France) E Benchetrit	5	6	6
(Chile) N Jarry	2	6	6^{5}
(France) M Janvier	6	2	7^{7}

Quarterfinals
(France) H Grenier	4	4
6	(Hungary) M Fucsovics	6	6
(France) E Benchetrit	4	2
(France) M Janvier	6	6

Semifinals
6	(Hungary) M Fucsovics	6	4	6
(France) M Janvier	3	6	2

=== Bottom half ===
First round
7	(Italy) A Seppi	3	6	7^{9}
(Germany) M Marterer	6	3	6^{7}
Q	(United States) N Pasha	6	2	7^{7}
Q	(Australia) T Fancutt	4	6	6^{2}
WC	(Australia) Alexander Crnokrak	1	2
(France) G Blancaneaux	6	6
(United States) S Bangoura	3	4
3	(Spain) G García López	6	6
5	(Dominican Republic) V Estrella Burgos	6	6
(Australia) L Saville	3	3
(Germany) T Pütz	5	7^{7}	6
(South Korea) S-w Kwon	7	6^{1}	4
WC	(Australia) D Propoggia	6	3	1
WC	(Australia) B Mitchell	3	6	6
(Japan) Yo Watanuki	7	1	4
2	(Germany) F Mayer	5	6	6

Second round
7	(Italy) A Seppi	6	6
Q	(United States) N Pasha	2	4
(France) G Blancaneaux	5	4
3	(Spain) G García López	7	6
5	(Dominican Republic) V Estrella Burgos	w/o
(Germany) T Pütz
WC	(Australia) B Mitchell	4	6^{6}
2	(Germany) F Mayer	6	7^{8}

Quarterfinals
7	(Italy) A Seppi	6	6
3	(Spain) G García López	3	4
5	(Dominican Republic) V Estrella Burgos	7^{7}	0	6
2	(Germany) F Mayer	6^{4}	6	3

Semifinals
7	(Italy) A Seppi	6	6
5	(Dominican Republic) V Estrella Burgos	2	2
