= 2020 Canberra Challenger – Singles =

Singles
- 2020 Canberra Challenger

Final
- Champion: (Germany) Philipp Kohlschreiber
- Runner-up: (Finland) Emil Ruusuvuori
- Score: 7–6^{(7–5)}, 4–6, 6–3

Events
Singles	Doubles
- Canberra Challenger

Hubert Hurkacz was the defending champion, but chose not to defend his title.

Philipp Kohlschreiber won the title after defeating Emil Ruusuvuori 7–6^{(7–5)}, 4–6, 6–3 in the final.

== Seeds ==
All seeds receive a bye into the second round.

1. (France) Ugo Humbert (third round)
2. (Italy) Andreas Seppi (second round)
3. (Italy) Jannik Sinner (second round)
4. (Germany) Philipp Kohlschreiber (champion)
5. (United States) Steve Johnson (quarterfinals)
6. (Spain) Jaume Munar (quarterfinals)
7. (South Korea) Kwon Soon-woo (quarterfinals)
8. (Germany) Dominik Koepfer (quarterfinals)
9. (United States) Marcos Giron (second round)
10. (Switzerland) Henri Laaksonen (third round)
11. (Canada) Brayden Schnur (second round)
12. (Slovakia) Norbert Gombos (second round)
13. (Japan) Taro Daniel (third round)
14. (Russia) Evgeny Donskoy (semifinals)
15. (United States) Denis Kudla (semifinals)
16. (Germany) Peter Gojowczyk (third round)

== Draw ==
Key

- Q = Qualifier
- WC = Wild card
- LL = Lucky loser
- Alt = Alternate
- ITF = ITF entry
- PR = Protected ranking
- SR = Special ranking
- SE = Special exempt
- JE = Junior exempt
- JR = Junior Accelerator Programme entrant
- CO = College Accelerator Programme entrant
- NG = Next Gen Accelerator Program entrant
- w/o = Walkover
- r = Retired
- d = Defaulted

=== Finals ===
Quarterfinals
15	(United States) Denis Kudla	7^{7}	6
6	(Spain) Jaume Munar	6^{3}	2
(Finland) Emil Ruusuvuori	6	6
8	(Germany) Dominik Koepfer	3	4
5	(United States) Steve Johnson	6^{4}	5
4	(Germany) Philipp Kohlschreiber	7^{7}	7
7	(South Korea) Kwon Soon-woo	6^{6}	6	1
14	(Russia) Evgeny Donskoy	7^{8}	4	6

Semifinals
15	(United States) Denis Kudla	0	5
(Finland) Emil Ruusuvuori	6	7
4	(Germany) Philipp Kohlschreiber	4	6	6
14	(Russia) Evgeny Donskoy	6	2	3

Final
(Finland) Emil Ruusuvuori	6^{5}	6	3
4	(Germany) Philipp Kohlschreiber	7^{7}	4	6

=== Top half ===
==== Section 1 ====
First round
(Sweden) E Ymer	5	6^{3}
(Serbia) D Petrović	7	7^{7}
WC	(Australia) M Ebden	2	4
(United States) M Krueger	6	6
(Germany) O Otte	5	6	6
(Italy) L Giustino	7	1	4
(Barbados) D King	4	6	6
(Chinese Taipei) J Jung	6	4	3

Second round
1	(France) U Humbert	6	6
(Serbia) D Petrović	1	4
(United States) M Krueger	7^{7}	2	4
15	(United States) D Kudla	6^{4}	6	6
10	(Switzerland) H Laaksonen	3	6	6
(Germany) O Otte	6	4	4
(Barbados) D King	6	3	0
6	(Spain) J Munar	4	6	6

Third round
1	(France) U Humbert	6^{4}	3
15	(United States) D Kudla	7^{7}	6
10	(Switzerland) H Laaksonen	3	3
6	(Spain) J Munar	6	6

Quarterfinals
15	(United States) D Kudla	7^{7}	6
6	(Spain) J Munar	6^{3}	2

==== Section 2 ====
First round
(Finland) E Ruusuvuori	3	6	6
(India) R Ramanathan	6	2	3
(India) P Gunneswaran	7	6
WC	(Australia) J Kubler	5	3
(Slovakia) F Horanský	2	1
(Australia) A Bolt	6	6
(Slovenia) B Rola	7	7^{7}
(Belarus) I Ivashka	5	6^{3}

Second round
3	(Italy) J Sinner	3	4
(Finland) E Ruusuvuori	6	6
(India) P Gunneswaran	4	6^{4}
13	(Japan) T Daniel	6	7^{7}
11	(Canada) B Schnur	2	3
(Australia) A Bolt	6	6
(Slovenia) B Rola	4	6	0
8	(Germany) D Koepfer	6	3	6

Third round
(Finland) E Ruusuvuori	6	6
13	(Japan) T Daniel	2	4
(Australia) A Bolt	6	3	5
8	(Germany) D Koepfer	3	6	7

Quarterfinals
(Finland) E Ruusuvuori	6	6
8	(Germany) D Koepfer	3	4

=== Bottom half ===
==== Section 3 ====
First round
WC	(Australia) M Purcell	2	4
(China) Zh Zhang	6	6
(Peru) JP Varillas	5	3
(United States) B Klahn	7	6
(Israel) D Sela	7	2	4
Q	(Colombia) DE Galán	5	6	6
(Ecuador) E Gómez	5	6^{4}
WC	(Australia) A Vukic	7	7^{7}

Second round
5	(United States) S Johnson	6^{9}	6	6
(China) Zh Zhang	7^{11}	4	4
(United States) B Klahn	6	6
12	(Slovakia) N Gombos	3	4
16	(Germany) P Gojowczyk	3	7	6
Q	(Colombia) DE Galán	6	5	3
WC	(Australia) A Vukic	4	5
4	(Germany) P Kohlschreiber	6	7

Third round
5	(United States) S Johnson	6	7^{7}
(United States) B Klahn	4	6^{4}
16	(Germany) P Gojowczyk	5	4
4	(Germany) P Kohlschreiber	7	6

Quarterfinals
5	(United States) S Johnson	6^{4}	5
4	(Germany) P Kohlschreiber	7^{7}	7

==== Section 4 ====
First round
(Germany) Y Maden	7^{7}	6
(Spain) G García López	6^{2}	3
Q	(Australia) H Bourchier	5	6	7^{7}
(Australia) M Polmans	7	3	6^{4}
(Romania) M Copil	6	5	6^{7}
(Australia) A Harris	4	7	7^{9}
WC	(Australia) A Santillan	4	0
LL	(China) Z Li	6	6

Second round
7	(South Korea) S-w Kwon	6	6
(Germany) Y Maden	1	2
Q	(Australia) H Bourchier	6	6^{3}	6
9	(United States) M Giron	3	7^{7}	3
14	(Russia) E Donskoy	6	7^{7}
(Australia) A Harris	3	6^{4}
LL	(China) Z Li	3	7	6
2	(Italy) A Seppi	6	5	4

Third round
7	(South Korea) S-w Kwon	6	6
Q	(Australia) H Bourchier	2	4
14	(Russia) E Donskoy	7^{7}	6
LL	(China) Z Li	6^{2}	2

Quarterfinals
7	(South Korea) S-w Kwon	6^{6}	6	1
14	(Russia) E Donskoy	7^{8}	4	6
