= 2017 Canberra Challenger =

- Date: 9-14 January 2017
- Edition: 2nd
- Category: ATP Challenger Tour
- Draw: 32S / 16D
- Prize money: $75,000
- Surface: Hard
- Location: Canberra, Australia

Champions

Singles
- (Israel) Dudi Sela

Doubles
- (Germany) Andre Begemann / (Germany) Jan-Lennard Struff
- Canberra Challenger

The 2017 Canberra Challenger is a professional tennis tournament played on outdoor hard courts. It is the second edition of the tournament, which is a part of the 2017 ATP Challenger Tour. It takes place in Canberra, Australia, between 9 and 14 January 2017.

== Singles main-draw entrants ==
=== Seeds ===
Country	Player	Rank^{1}	Seed
GER	Jan-Lennard Struff	63	1
AUT	Gerald Melzer	68	2
FRA	Pierre-Hugues Herbert	78	3
ARG	Renzo Olivo	83	4
RUS	Konstantin Kravchuk	85	5
BEL	Steve Darcis	86	6
ARG	Carlos Berlocq	95	7
ISR	Dudi Sela	96	8

- ^{1} Rankings are as of January 2, 2017.

=== Other entrants ===
The following players received wildcards into the singles main draw:

- (Australia) Andrew Harris
- (Australia) Alexei Popyrin
- (Australia) Calum Puttergill
- (Australia) Brandon Walkin

The following players received entry from the qualifying draw:

- (Australia) James Frawley
- (Switzerland) Luca Margaroli
- (United States) Nathan Pasha
- (Japan) Yusuke Watanuki

The following player received entry as a lucky loser:

- (Australia) Jake Delaney

== Champions ==
=== Men's singles ===
- (Israel) Dudi Sela def. (Germany) Jan-Lennard Struff 3–6, 6–4, 6–3.

=== Men's doubles ===
- (Germany) Andre Begemann / (Germany) Jan-Lennard Struff def. (Argentina) Carlos Berlocq / (Argentina) Andrés Molteni 6–3, 6–4.
