= 2019 Canberra Challenger – Doubles =

Doubles
- 2019 Canberra Challenger

Final
- Champions: (Brazil) Marcelo Demoliner (France) Hugo Nys
- Runners-up: (Sweden) André Göransson (Netherlands) Sem Verbeek
- Score: 3–6, 6–4, [10–3]

Events
Singles	Doubles
- Canberra Challenger

Jonathan Erlich and Divij Sharan were the defending champions but chose not to defend their title.

Marcelo Demoliner and Hugo Nys won the title after defeating André Göransson and Sem Verbeek 3–6, 6–4, [10–3] in the final.

== Seeds ==
1. (Ukraine) Denys Molchanov / (Slovakia) Igor Zelenay (semifinals)
2. (Germany) Andreas Mies / (Chile) Hans Podlipnik Castillo (quarterfinals)
3. (Brazil) Marcelo Demoliner / (France) Hugo Nys (champions)
4. (Spain) David Marrero / (France) Fabrice Martin (first round)

== Draw ==
Key

- Q = Qualifier
- WC = Wild card
- LL = Lucky loser
- Alt = Alternate
- ITF = ITF entry
- PR = Protected ranking
- SR = Special ranking
- SE = Special exempt
- JE = Junior exempt
- JR = Junior Accelerator Programme entrant
- CO = College Accelerator Programme entrant
- NG = Next Gen Accelerator Program entrant
- w/o = Walkover
- r = Retired
- d = Defaulted

First round
1	(Ukraine) D Molchanov (Slovakia) I Zelenay	3	6	[10]
(United Kingdom) B Klein (Australia) B Mousley	6	3	[7]
WC	(Australia) H Bourchier (Australia) D Kelly	6	1	[8]
(Australia) A Harris (China) Z Li	2	6	[10]
3	(Brazil) M Demoliner (France) H Nys	6	7^{7}
(Belgium) S Gillé (Belgium) J Vliegen	3	6^{4}
WC	(Australia) A Taylor (Australia) J Taylor	4	4
(United States) JP Fruttero (Switzerland) M-A Hüsler	6	6
(Sweden) A Göransson (Netherlands) S Verbeek	6	6
WC	(Australia) T Fancutt (Australia) Jacob Grills	3	2
(Bosnia and Herzegovina) T Brkić (Argentina) R Olivo	5	6	[10]
4	(Spain) D Marrero (France) F Martin	7	2	[6]
(Uruguay) A Behar (France) G Blancaneaux	6	6
ITF	(France) S Doumbia (Russia) A Zhurbin	2	2
ITF	(Italy) M Bortolotti (Australia) S Puodziunas	3	3
2	(Germany) A Mies (Chile) H Podlipnik Castillo	6	6

Quarterfinals
1	(Ukraine) D Molchanov (Slovakia) I Zelenay	7^{7}	6
(Australia) A Harris (China) Z Li	6^{3}	3
3	(Brazil) M Demoliner (France) H Nys	6^{5}	6	[11]
(United States) JP Fruttero (Switzerland) M-A Hüsler	7^{7}	4	[9]
(Sweden) A Göransson (Netherlands) S Verbeek	6	6
(Bosnia and Herzegovina) T Brkić (Argentina) R Olivo	4	2
(Uruguay) A Behar (France) G Blancaneaux	4	6	[15]
2	(Germany) A Mies (Chile) H Podlipnik Castillo	6	2	[13]

Semifinals
1	(Ukraine) D Molchanov (Slovakia) I Zelenay	5	6	[8]
3	(Brazil) M Demoliner (France) H Nys	7	3	[10]
(Sweden) A Göransson (Netherlands) S Verbeek	6	7
(Uruguay) A Behar (France) G Blancaneaux	1	5

Final
3	(Brazil) M Demoliner (France) H Nys	3	6	[10]
(Sweden) A Göransson (Netherlands) S Verbeek	6	4	[3]
