= 2014 Heilbronner Neckarcup – Singles =

Singles
- 2014 Heilbronner Neckarcup

Final
- Champion: (Germany) Jan-Lennard Struff
- Runner-up: (Hungary) Márton Fucsovics
- Score: 6–2, 7–6^{(7–5)}

Events
Singles	Doubles
Heilbronner Neckarcup	· 2015 →

This was the first edition of the event.

Jan-Lennard Struff won the title, defeating Márton Fucsovics in the final, 6–2, 7–6^{(7–5)}.

== Seeds ==
1. (Germany) Jan-Lennard Struff (champion)
2. (Germany) Dustin Brown (first round)
3. (United States) Michael Russell (second round)
4. (Russia) Andrey Kuznetsov (quarterfinals)
5. (Austria) Andreas Haider-Maurer (second round)
6. (Germany) Julian Reister (withdrew because of back injury)
7. (Slovenia) Blaž Kavčič (quarterfinals)
8. (Canada) Frank Dancevic (first round)
9. (Turkey) Marsel İlhan (quarterfinals)

== Draw ==
=== Key ===
- Q = Qualifier
- WC = Wild card
- LL = Lucky loser
- Alt = Alternate
- SE = Special exempt
- PR = Protected ranking
- ITF = ITF entry
- JE = Junior exempt
- w/o = Walkover
- r = Retired
- d = Defaulted
- SR = Special ranking

=== Finals ===
Semifinals
1	(Germany) Jan-Lennard Struff	6	6
Q	(Australia) Thanasi Kokkinakis	2	1
(Hungary) Márton Fucsovics	6	4	6
(Slovakia) Andrej Martin	3	6	4

Final
1	(Germany) Jan-Lennard Struff	6	7^{7}
(Hungary) Márton Fucsovics	2	6^{5}

=== Top half ===
First round
1	(Germany) J-L Struff	5	6	6
LL	(Belarus) E Gerasimov	7	2	4
WC	(Germany) N Langer	6	1	4
(Ukraine) I Marchenko	4	6	6
Q	(Brazil) A Ghem	6	6
(Japan) H Moriya	1	0
Q	(Australia) J Kubler	6^{6}	5
5	(Austria) A Haider-Maurer	7^{8}	7
3	(United States) M Russell	6	7
(Slovakia) N Gomboš	4	5
(Netherlands) J Huta Galung	4	2
Q	(Australia) T Kokkinakis	6	6
(Serbia) F Krajinović	6	3	4
(Moldova) R Albot	3	6	6
Q	(Belgium) K Coppejans	1	2
9	(Turkey) M İlhan	6	6

Second round
1	(Germany) J-L Struff	6	6
(Ukraine) I Marchenko	1	2
Q	(Brazil) A Ghem	6	6
5	(Austria) A Haider-Maurer	1	3
3	(United States) M Russell	2	1
Q	(Australia) T Kokkinakis	6	6
(Moldova) R Albot	2	4
9	(Turkey) M İlhan	6	6

Quarterfinals
1	(Germany) J-L Struff	6	7
Q	(Brazil) A Ghem	3	5
Q	(Australia) T Kokkinakis	4	6	7
9	(Turkey) M İlhan	6	3	5

Semifinals
1	(Germany) J-L Struff	6	6
Q	(Australia) T Kokkinakis	2	1

=== Bottom half ===
First round
8	(Canada) F Dancevic	6^{6}	4
(Hungary) M Fucsovics	7^{8}	6
(Austria) M Fischer	4	3
(France) G Burquier	6	6
(Australia) J Duckworth	4	3
WC	(Germany) A Zverev	6	6
PR	(Ecuador) G Lapentti	3	6^{2}
4	(Russia) A Kuznetsov	6	7^{7}
7	(Slovenia) B Kavčič	7^{7}	6
WC	(Germany) B Phau	6^{5}	3
(Germany) A Beck	4	4
(United Kingdom) J Ward	6	6
(Australia) N Kyrgios	1	4
(Slovakia) A Martin	6	6
WC	(United Kingdom) K Edmund	4	6	6
2	(Germany) D Brown	6	1	4

Second round
(Hungary) M Fucsovics	6	7^{7}
(France) G Burquier	2	6^{5}
WC	(Germany) A Zverev	2	6	5
4	(Russia) A Kuznetsov	6	4	7
7	(Slovenia) B Kavčič	6	3	7
(United Kingdom) J Ward	1	6	5
(Slovakia) A Martin	6	6
WC	(United Kingdom) K Edmund	3	3

Quarterfinals
(Hungary) M Fucsovics	6^{3}	6	6
4	(Russia) A Kuznetsov	7^{7}	3	1
7	(Slovenia) B Kavčič	4	3
(Slovakia) A Martin	6	6

Semifinals
(Hungary) M Fucsovics	6	4	6
(Slovakia) A Martin	3	6	4
