= 2019 Canberra Challenger =

- Date: 6–12 January 2019
- Edition: 4th
- Category: ATP Challenger Tour
- Draw: 48S / 16D
- Surface: Hard
- Location: Canberra, Australia

Champions

Singles
- (Poland) Hubert Hurkacz

Doubles
- (Brazil) Marcelo Demoliner / (France) Hugo Nys
- Canberra Challenger

The 2019 East Hotel Canberra Challenger was a professional tennis tournament played on outdoor hard courts. It was the fourth edition of the tournament which was a part of the 2019 ATP Challenger Tour. It took place in Canberra, Australia between 6 and 12 January 2019.

== Singles main-draw entrants ==
=== Seeds ===
Country	Player	Rank^{1}	Seed
ESP	Roberto Carballés Baena	73	1
POL	Hubert Hurkacz	86	2
CZE	Jiří Veselý	89	3
BLR	Ilya Ivashka	91	4
AUS	Marc Polmans	166	5
KOR	Chung Yun-seong	274	6
FRA	Elliot Benchetrit	275	7
CHN	Li Zhe	277	8
BIH	Tomislav Brkić	302	9
CHN	Wu Di	307	10
FRA	Tristan Lamasine	309	11
AUS	Bradley Mousley	327	12
USA	Roy Smith	328	13
ARG	Renzo Olivo	331	14
FRA	Tak Khunn Wang	333	15
FRA	Hugo Grenier	341	16

- ^{1} Rankings are as of December 31, 2018.

=== Other entrants ===
The following players received wildcards into the singles main draw:

- (Australia) Aaron Addison
- (Australia) Thomas Bosancic
- (Australia) Tom Evans
- (Australia) James Frawley
- (Australia) Bradley Mousley

The following players received entry into the singles main draw using their ITF World Tennis Ranking:

- (Italy) Marco Bortolotti
- (France) Sadio Doumbia
- (Northern Mariana Islands) Colin Sinclair
- (Russia) Alexander Zhurbin

The following players received entry into the singles main draw as alternates:

- (Australia) David Barclay
- (France) Maxime Chazal
- (Australia) Matthew Romios
- (Netherlands) Sem Verbeek

The following players received entry from the qualifying draw:

- (France) Fabrice Martin
- (Australia) Lucas Vuradin

== Champions ==
=== Singles ===
- (Poland) Hubert Hurkacz def. (Belarus) Ilya Ivashka 6–4, 4–6, 6–2.

=== Doubles ===
- (Brazil) Marcelo Demoliner / (France) Hugo Nys def. (Sweden) André Göransson / (Netherlands) Sem Verbeek 3–6, 6–4, [10–3].
