= Andrei Vasilevski (tennis) =

Belarusian tennis player (born 1991)

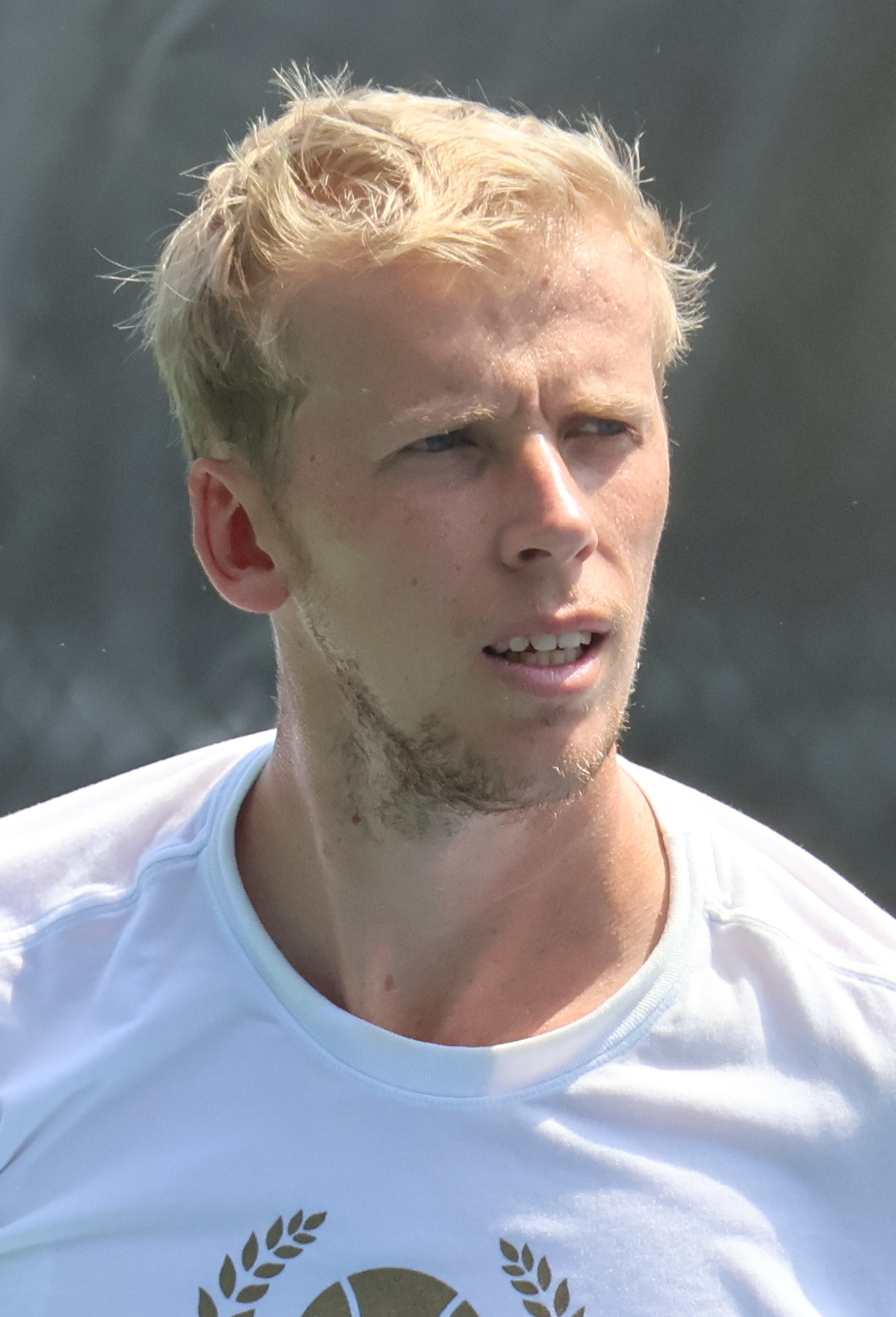
- Vasilevski in 2024
- Country (sports): Belarus
- Born: 28 May 1991 (age 35) Minsk, Belarusian SSR, Soviet Union
- Height: 1.85 m (6 ft 1 in)
- Turned pro: 2009
- Retired: 2022 (last match played)
- Plays: Right-handed (two handed-backhand)
- Coach: Aliaksandr Vasilevski
- Prize money: $411,099

Singles
- Career record: 0-5 (at ATP Tour level, Grand Slam level, and in Davis Cup)
- Career titles: 0
- Highest ranking: No. 569 (13 October 2014)

Doubles
- Career record: 40-59 (at ATP Tour level, Grand Slam level, and in Davis Cup)
- Career titles: 1
- Highest ranking: No. 52 (5 February 2018)

Grand Slam doubles results
- Australian Open: 3R (2018)
- French Open: 1R (2018)
- Wimbledon: QF (2017)
- US Open: 1R (2017)

Grand Slam mixed doubles results
- Wimbledon: 3R (2021)

Team competitions
- Davis Cup: 3-10
- Last updated on: 15 April 2023.

Andrei Aleksandrovich Vasilevski (Belarusian: Андрэй Аляксандравіч Васілеўскі; Russian: Андрей Александрович Василевский; born 28 May 1991) is a Belarusian former professional tennis player. He has a career-high doubles ranking of World No. 52 achieved on 5 February 2018. Vasilevski competed for the Belarus Davis Cup team starting in 2009. As of 2024, he is the hitting partner for compatriot Aryna Sabalenka.

== Professional career ==
=== 2017-2018: Maiden ATP final ===
Vasilevski finished as runner-up, partnering Hans Podlipnik Castillo in the doubles competition of the 2017 Generali Open Kitzbühel, losing to fourth seeded pair of Pablo Cuevas and Guillermo Durán. Three weeks earlier in July, the pair also reached the quarterfinals of a Grand Slam at the 2017 Wimbledon Championships for the first time in their career defeating seeds No. 12 Juan Sebastián Cabal and Robert Farah and seeds No. 7 Raven Klaasen and Rajeev Ram en route.

=== 2020-2021: Maiden ATP doubles title ===
Vasilevski reached his second ATP final with Jonathan Erlich at the 2020 Maharashtra Open in Pune, but lost to André Göransson and Christopher Rungkat.

Vasilevski won his maiden doubles title on his 30th birthday at the 2021 Belgrade Open partnering Jonathan Erlich who won his 22nd title. He also reached two other finals with Erlich at the 2021 Open Sud de France in Montpellier losing to the top seeded pair Kontinen/Roger-Vasselin, at the 2021 Astana Open in Nur-Sultan losing also to top seeded pair Santiago González/Andrés Molteni.

== ATP career finals ==
=== Doubles: 5 (1 title, 4 runners-up) ===
| Winner – Legend Grand Slam tournaments (0–0) ATP World Tour Finals (0–0) ATP World Tour Masters 1000 (0–0) ATP World Tour 500 Series (0–0) ATP World Tour 250 Series (1–4) | Finals by surface Hard (0–3) Clay (1–1) Grass (0–0) |

| Result | W–L | Date | Tournament | Tier | Surface | Partner | Opponents | Score |
|---|---|---|---|---|---|---|---|---|
| Loss | 0–1 | Aug 2017 | Austrian Open, Austria | 250 Series | Clay | (Chile) Hans Podlipnik Castillo | (Uruguay) Pablo Cuevas (Argentina) Guillermo Durán | 4–6, 6–4, [10–12] |
| Loss | 0–2 | Feb 2020 | Maharashtra Open, India | 250 Series | Hard | (Israel) Jonathan Erlich | (Sweden) André Göransson (Indonesia) Christopher Rungkat | 2–6, 6–3, [8–10] |
| Loss | 0–3 | Feb 2021 | Open Sud de France, France | 250 Series | Hard (i) | (Israel) Jonathan Erlich | (Finland) Henri Kontinen (France) Édouard Roger-Vasselin | 2–6, 5–7 |
| Win | 1–3 | May 2021 | Belgrade Open, Serbia | 250 Series | Clay | (Israel) Jonathan Erlich | (Sweden) André Göransson (Brazil) Rafael Matos | 6–4, 6–1 |
| Loss | 1–4 | Sep 2021 | Astana Open, Kazakhstan | 250 Series | Hard (i) | (Israel) Jonathan Erlich | (Mexico) Santiago González (Argentina) Andrés Molteni | 1–6, 2–6 |

== Challenger and Futures Finals ==
=== Singles: 1 (1–0) ===
| Legend (singles) ATP Challenger Tour (0–0) ITF Futures Tour (1–0) | Titles by surface Hard (1–0) Clay (0–0) Grass (0–0) Carpet (0–0) |

| Result | W–L | Date | Tournament | Tier | Surface | Opponent | Score |
|---|---|---|---|---|---|---|---|
| Win | 1–0 | Jul 2014 | Kazakhstan F9, Astana | Futures | Hard | (Kazakhstan) Denis Yevseyev | 6–4, 6–3 |

=== Doubles: 75 (41–34) ===
| Legend (doubles) ATP Challenger Tour (14–13) ITF Futures Tour (27–21) | Titles by surface Hard (24–16) Clay (16–15) Grass (0–0) Carpet (0–1) |

| Result | W–L | Date | Tournament | Tier | Surface | Partner | Opponents | Score |
|---|---|---|---|---|---|---|---|---|
| Loss | 0–1 | Oct 2009 | Belarus F2, Minsk | Futures | Hard (i) | (Belarus) Aliaksandr Bury | (Belarus) Sergey Betov (Belarus) Nikolai Fidirko | 3–6, 3–6 |
| Loss | 0–2 | Jun 2010 | Poland F4, Gliwice | Futures | Clay | (Belarus) Nikolai Fidirko | (Poland) Błażej Koniusz (Poland) Grzegorz Panfil | 3–6, 1–6 |
| Win | 1–2 | Aug 2010 | Belarus F2, Minsk | Futures | Clay | (Belarus) Nikolai Fidirko | (Russia) Andrei Levine (Serbia) David Savić | 6–4, 7–5 |
| Win | 2–2 | Oct 2010 | Kazakhstan F3, Astana | Futures | Hard (i) | (Russia) Vitali Reshetnikov | (Russia) Sergei Krotiouk (Kazakhstan) Serizhan Yessenbekov | 6–3, 6–2 |
| Win | 3–2 | Oct 2010 | Kazakhstan F4, Astana | Futures | Hard (i) | (Russia) Mikhail Elgin | (Belarus) Sergey Betov (Kazakhstan) Alexey Kedryuk | 5–7, 6–4, [10–4] |
| Loss | 3–3 | Oct 2010 | Belarus F4, Minsk | Futures | Hard (i) | (Russia) Vitali Reshetnikov | (Belarus) Sergey Betov (Belarus) Dzmitry Zhyrmont | 3–6, 3–6 |
| Win | 4–3 | Mar 2011 | Russia F4, Tyumen | Futures | Hard (i) | (Russia) Alexander Rumyantsev | (Russia) Vitali Reshetnikov (Russia) Dmitri Sitak | 6–2, 6–4 |
| Loss | 4–4 | May 2011 | Uzbekistan F1, Andijan | Futures | Hard | (Russia) Alexander Rumyantsev | (Russia) Ervand Gasparyan (Finland) Harri Heliövaara | 4–6, 5–7 |
| Loss | 4–5 | Jun 2011 | Uzbekistan F2, Namangan | Futures | Hard | (Russia) Alexander Rumyantsev | (South Africa) Raven Klaasen (New Zealand) Michael Venus | 1–6, 1–6 |
| Win | 5–5 | Jul 2011 | Estonia F1, Tallinn | Futures | Clay | (Belarus) Aliaksandr Bury | (Belarus) Pavel Filin (Belarus) Dzmitry Zhyrmont | 4–6, 7–6^{(7–5)}, [10–6] |
| Win | 6–5 | Aug 2011 | Lithuania F1, Vilnius | Futures | Clay | (Chile) Hans Podlipnik Castillo | (Belarus) Nikolai Fidirko (Belarus) Egor Gerasimov | 6–2, 6–2 |
| Loss | 6–6 | Sep 2011 | Poland F8, Sobota | Futures | Clay | (Belarus) Aliaksandr Bury | (Poland) Adam Chadaj (Poland) Andriej Kapaś | 5–7, 4–6 |
| Loss | 6–7 | Sep 2011 | Trnava, Slovakia | Challenger | Clay | (Belarus) Aliaksandr Bury | (Australia) Colin Ebelthite (Czech Republic) Jaroslav Pospíšil | 3–6, 4–6 |
| Loss | 6–8 | Oct 2011 | Palermo, Italy | Challenger | Clay | (Belarus) Aliaksandr Bury | (Poland) Tomasz Bednarek (Poland) Mateusz Kowalczyk | 2–6, 4–6 |
| Loss | 6–9 | Jan 2012 | Russia F3, Sergiyev Posad | Futures | Hard (i) | (Russia) Ervand Gasparyan | (Latvia) Andis Juška (Latvia) Deniss Pavlovs | 1–6, 4–6 |
| Loss | 6–10 | Mar 2012 | Russia F6, Moscow | Futures | Carpet (i) | (Belarus) Sergey Betov | (Latvia) Andis Juška (Latvia) Deniss Pavlovs | 6–7^{(5–7)}, 1–6 |
| Loss | 6–11 | Mar 2012 | Russia F7, Tyumen | Futures | Hard (i) | (Russia) Sergei Krotiouk | (Latvia) Andis Juška (Latvia) Deniss Pavlovs | 3–6, 4–6 |
| Loss | 6–12 | Apr 2012 | Kazakhstan F2, Astana | Futures | Hard (i) | (Belarus) Sergey Betov | (Russia) Mikhail Fufygin (Russia) Andrei Levine | 7–6^{(7–3)}, 5–7, [12–14] |
| Loss | 6–13 | Jun 2012 | Poland F3, Bytom | Futures | Clay | (Poland) Piotr Gadomski | (Poland) Mateusz Kowalczyk (Poland) Grzegorz Panfil | 4–6, 6–7^{(3–7)} |
| Loss | 6–14 | Jun 2012 | Košice, Slovakia | Challenger | Clay | (Belarus) Uladzimir Ignatik | (Poland) Tomasz Bednarek (Poland) Mateusz Kowalczyk | 2–6, 7–5, [12–14] |
| Win | 7–14 | Jun 2012 | Russia F9, Kazan | Futures | Clay | (Belarus) Egor Gerasimov | (Russia) Ivan Nedelko (Russia) Anton Zaitcev | 6–4, 6–4 |
| Win | 8–14 | Aug 2012 | Poland F4, Bydgoszcz | Futures | Clay | (Ukraine) Artem Smirnov | (Poland) Grzegorz Panfil (Poland) Michał Przysiężny | 7–6^{(8–6)}, 6–0 |
| Loss | 8–15 | Nov 2012 | USA F31, Niceville | Futures | Clay | (New Zealand) Artem Sitak | (United States) Jason Jung (United States) Ryan Thacher | 5–7, 2–6 |
| Loss | 8–16 | Mar 2013 | Russia F2, Yoshkar-Ola | Futures | Hard (i) | (Belarus) Egor Gerasimov | (Netherlands) Antal van der Duim (Netherlands) Boy Westerhof | 6–7^{(8–10)}, 3–6 |
| Loss | 8–17 | Mar 2013 | Russia F3, Tyumen | Futures | Hard (i) | (Estonia) Vladimir Ivanov | (Belarus) Aliaksandr Bury (Russia) Mikhail Fufygin | 6–7^{(2–7)}, 3–6 |
| Loss | 8–18 | May 2013 | Russia F6, Kazan | Futures | Clay | (Estonia) Vladimir Ivanov | (Russia) Mikhail Fufygin (Russia) Andrei Levine | 2–6, 4–6 |
| Loss | 8–19 | Jun 2013 | Germany F6, Cologne | Futures | Clay | (Belarus) Nikolai Fidirko | (Russia) Andrei Plotniy (Kazakhstan) Denis Yevseyev | 3–6, 3–6 |
| Win | 9–19 | Aug 2013 | Belarus F1, Minsk | Futures | Hard | (Belarus) Yaraslav Shyla | (France) Jules Marie (France) Fabrice Martin | 6–4, 7–6^{(7–2)} |
| Win | 10–19 | Feb 2014 | Russia F1, Moscow | Futures | Hard (i) | (Belarus) Yaraslav Shyla | (Russia) Anton Galkin (Russia) Ilya Lebedev | 7–5, 4–6, [10–8] |
| Win | 11–19 | Mar 2014 | Kazakhstan F1, Aktobe | Futures | Hard (i) | (Belarus) Yaraslav Shyla | (Georgia (country)) Aleksandre Metreveli (Kazakhstan) Denis Yevseyev | 6–3, 3–6, [12–10] |
| Win | 12–19 | Mar 2014 | Kazakhstan F2, Aktobe | Futures | Hard (i) | (Belarus) Yaraslav Shyla | (Russia) Ilya Lebedev (Russia) Dmitry Surchenko | 6–3, 5–7, [10–4] |
| Win | 13–19 | Mar 2014 | Kazakhstan F3, Aktobe | Futures | Hard (i) | (Belarus) Yaraslav Shyla | (Russia) Mikhail Fufygin (Uzbekistan) Shonigmatjon Shofayziev | 6–4, 6–3 |
| Loss | 13–20 | Apr 2014 | Kazakhstan F4, Shymkent | Futures | Clay | (Belarus) Yaraslav Shyla | (Russia) Kirill Dmitriev (Russia) Andrei Plotniy | 6–4, 4–6, [12–14] |
| Win | 14–20 | Apr 2014 | Kazakhstan F5, Shymkent | Futures | Clay | (Belarus) Yaraslav Shyla | (Ukraine) Dmytro Badanov (Russia) Yan Sabanin | 6–2, 6–2 |
| Win | 15–20 | Apr 2014 | Kazakhstan F6, Shymkent | Futures | Clay | (Belarus) Yaraslav Shyla | (Estonia) Vladimir Ivanov (Russia) Ivan Nedelko | 7–6^{(8–6)}, 6–0 |
| Win | 16–20 | Jun 2014 | Kazakhstan F8, Astana | Futures | Hard | (Belarus) Yaraslav Shyla | (Russia) Mikhail Fufygin (Uzbekistan) Shonigmatjon Shofayziev | 6–4, 6–3 |
| Loss | 16–21 | Jul 2014 | Kazakhstan F9, Astana | Futures | Hard | (Belarus) Yaraslav Shyla | (Russia) Mikhail Fufygin (Uzbekistan) Shonigmatjon Shofayziev | 3–6, 7–5, [6–10] |
| Loss | 16–22 | Sep 2014 | Russia F10, Vsevolozhsk | Futures | Clay | (Estonia) Vladimir Ivanov | (Kazakhstan) Alexander Bublik (Russia) Richard Muzaev | 3–6, 6–3, [9–11] |
| Loss | 16–23 | Oct 2014 | Belarus F3, Minsk | Futures | Hard (i) | (Uzbekistan) Shonigmatjon Shofayziev | (Lithuania) Laurynas Grigelis (Lithuania) Lukas Mugevičius | 4–6, 6–4, [6–10] |
| Win | 17–23 | Jan 2015 | Kazakhstan F1, Astana | Futures | Hard (i) | (Belarus) Yaraslav Shyla | (Russia) Mikhail Elgin (Russia) Karen Khachanov | 3–6, 7–6^{(7–2)}, [10–4] |
| Win | 18–23 | Jan 2015 | Kazakhstan F2, Astana | Futures | Hard (i) | (Belarus) Yaraslav Shyla | (Russia) Evgenii Tiurnev (Russia) Anton Zaitcev | 7–6^{(7–5)}, 7–6^{(7–5)} |
| Win | 19–23 | Mar 2015 | Tunisia F8, El Kantaoui | Futures | Hard | (Belarus) Yaraslav Shyla | (Italy) Claudio Grassi (United Kingdom) David Rice | 6–3, 4–6, [10–6] |
| Win | 20–23 | Apr 2015 | Kazakhstan F3, Shymkent | Futures | Clay | (Belarus) Yaraslav Shyla | (Russia) Ivan Gakhov (Russia) Evgenii Tiurnev | 4–6, 6–3, [10–6] |
| Win | 21–23 | May 2015 | Kazakhstan F4, Shymkent | Futures | Clay | (Belarus) Yaraslav Shyla | (Estonia) Vladimir Ivanov (Ukraine) Volodymyr Uzhylovskyi | 6–2, 7–6^{(7–4)} |
| Win | 22–23 | Aug 2015 | Russia F5, Moscow | Futures | Clay | (Estonia) Vladimir Ivanov | (Ukraine) Vladyslav Manafov (Netherlands) Mark Vervoort | 6–2, 6–4 |
| Win | 23–23 | Oct 2015 | Belarus F3, Minsk | Futures | Hard (i) | (Belarus) Dzmitry Zhyrmont | (Ukraine) Danylo Kalenichenko (Slovakia) Adrian Sikora | 6–2, 6–4 |
| Win | 24–23 | Oct 2015 | Belarus F4, Minsk | Futures | Hard (i) | (Belarus) Dzmitry Zhyrmont | (Belarus) Maxim Dubarenco (Russia) Evgenii Tiurnev | 6–3, 6–3 |
| Win | 25–23 | Jan 2016 | Kazakhstan F1, Aktobe | Futures | Hard (i) | (Belarus) Yaraslav Shyla | (Russia) Evgeny Karlovskiy (Russia) Denis Matsukevich | 6–3, 6–2 |
| Win | 26–23 | Jan 2016 | Kazakhstan F2, Aktobe | Futures | Hard (i) | (Belarus) Yaraslav Shyla | (Uzbekistan) Sanjar Fayziev (Kazakhstan) Timur Khabibulin | 4–6, 6–4, [12–10] |
| Win | 27–23 | Apr 2016 | Kazakhstan F3, Shymkent | Futures | Clay | (Uzbekistan) Sanjar Fayziev | (Russia) Markos Kalovelonis (Georgia (country)) Aleksandre Metreveli | 6–2, 6–4 |
| Loss | 27–24 | Apr 2016 | Kazakhstan F4, Shymkent | Futures | Clay | (Serbia) Miki Janković | (Russia) Markos Kalovelonis (Georgia (country)) Aleksandre Metreveli | 4–6, 1–6 |
| Win | 28–24 | May 2016 | Samarkand, Uzbekistan | Challenger | Clay | (Russia) Denis Matsukevich | (Chinese Taipei) Hsieh Cheng-peng (Chinese Taipei) Yang Tsung-hua | 6–4, 5–7, [10–5] |
| Win | 29–24 | Jul 2016 | Astana, Kazakhstan | Challenger | Hard | (Belarus) Yaraslav Shyla | (Russia) Mikhail Elgin (Russia) Alexander Kudryavtsev | 6–4, 6–4 |
| Win | 30–24 | Aug 2016 | Meerbusch, Germany | Challenger | Clay | (Russia) Mikhail Elgin | (Belgium) Sander Gillé (Belgium) Joran Vliegen | 7–6^{(8–6)}, 6–4 |
| Loss | 30–25 | Sep 2016 | Genova, Italy | Challenger | Clay | (Belarus) Aliaksandr Bury | (Chile) Julio Peralta (Argentina) Horacio Zeballos | 4–6, 3–6 |
| Loss | 30–26 | Oct 2016 | Orléans, France | Challenger | Hard (i) | (Uruguay) Ariel Behar | (Croatia) Nikola Mektić (Croatia) Franko Škugor | 2–6, 5–7 |
| Win | 31–26 | Jan 2017 | Koblenz, Germany | Challenger | Hard (i) | (Chile) Hans Podlipnik Castillo | (Czech Republic) Roman Jebavý (Czech Republic) Lukáš Rosol | 7–5, 3–6, [16–14] |
| Win | 32–26 | Mar 2017 | Wrocław, Poland | Challenger | Hard (i) | (Canada) Adil Shamasdin | (Russia) Mikhail Elgin (Ukraine) Denys Molchanov | 6–3, 3–6, [21–19] |
| Win | 33–26 | May 2017 | Shymkent, Kazakhstan | Challenger | Clay | (Chile) Hans Podlipnik Castillo | (Belgium) Clement Geens (Argentina) Juan Pablo Paz | 6–4, 6–2 |
| Win | 34–26 | Aug 2017 | Portorož, Slovenia | Challenger | Hard | (Chile) Hans Podlipnik Castillo | (Czech Republic) Lukáš Rosol (Croatia) Franko Škugor | 6–3, 7–6^{(7–4)} |
| Win | 35–26 | Oct 2017 | Tashkent, Uzbekistan | Challenger | Hard | (Chile) Hans Podlipnik Castillo | (India) Yuki Bhambri (India) Divij Sharan | 6–4, 6–2 |
| Loss | 35–27 | Jan 2018 | Canberra, Australia | Challenger | Hard | (Chile) Hans Podlipnik Castillo | (Israel) Jonathan Erlich (India) Divij Sharan | 6–7^{(1–7)}, 2–6 |
| Loss | 35–28 | Nov 2018 | Bratislava, Slovakia | Challenger | Hard (i) | (India) Ramkumar Ramanathan | (Ukraine) Denys Molchanov (Slovakia) Igor Zelenay | 2–6, 6–3, [9–11] |
| Win | 36–28 | Jan 2019 | Orlando, USA | Challenger | Hard | (Monaco) Romain Arneodo | (Portugal) Gonçalo Oliveira (Italy) Andrea Vavassori | 7–6^{(7–2)}, 2–6, [15–13] |
| Loss | 36–29 | Jan 2019 | Newport Beach, USA | Challenger | Hard | (Monaco) Romain Arneodo | (United States) Robert Galloway (United States) Nathaniel Lammons | 5–7, 6–7^{(1–7)} |
| Win | 37–29 | Feb 2019 | Cleveland, USA | Challenger | Hard | (Monaco) Romain Arneodo | (United States) Robert Galloway (United States) Nathaniel Lammons | 6–4, 7–6^{(7–4)} |
| Loss | 37–30 | Apr 2019 | Murcia, Spain | Challenger | Clay | (Australia) Rameez Junaid | (New Zealand) Marcus Daniell (Spain) David Marrero | 4–6, 4–6 |
| Loss | 37–31 | May 2019 | Shymkent, Uzbekistan | Challenger | Clay | (Portugal) Gonçalo Oliveira | (Austria) Jurij Rodionov (Finland) Emil Ruusuvuori | 4–6, 6–3, [8–10] |
| Win | 38–31 | May 2019 | Samarkand, Uzbekistan | Challenger | Clay | (Portugal) Gonçalo Oliveira | (Uzbekistan) Sergey Fomin (Russia) Teymuraz Gabashvili | 3–6, 6–3, [10–4] |
| Win | 39–31 | May 2019 | Vicenza, Italy | Challenger | Clay | (Portugal) Gonçalo Oliveira | (Brazil) Fabrício Neis (Brazil) Fernando Romboli | 6–3, 6–4 |
| Loss | 39–32 | Jun 2019 | Almaty, Uzbekistan | Challenger | Clay | (Portugal) Gonçalo Oliveira | (Slovakia) Andrej Martin (Chile) Hans Podlipnik Castillo | 6–7^{(4–7)}, 6–3, [8–10] |
| Loss | 39–33 | Jun 2019 | Milan, Italy | Challenger | Clay | (Italy) Andrea Vavassori | (Bosnia and Herzegovina) Tomislav Brkić (Croatia) Ante Pavić | 6–7^{(6–8)}, 2–6 |
| Win | 40–33 | Aug 2019 | Augsburg, Germany | Challenger | Clay | (Slovakia) Igor Zelenay | (Croatia) Ivan Sabanov (Croatia) Matej Sabanov | 4–6, 6–4, [10–3] |
| Win | 41–33 | Oct 2019 | Brest, France | Challenger | Hard (i) | (Ukraine) Denys Molchanov | (Italy) Andrea Vavassori (Spain) David Vega Hernández | 6-3, 6–1 |
| Loss | 41–34 | Jan 2020 | Bendigo, Australia | Challenger | Hard | (Israel) Jonathan Erlich | (Australia) Max Purcell (Australia) Luke Saville | 6–7^{(3–7)}, 6–7^{(3–7)} |
