= Jan-Lennard Struff =

German tennis player (born 1990)

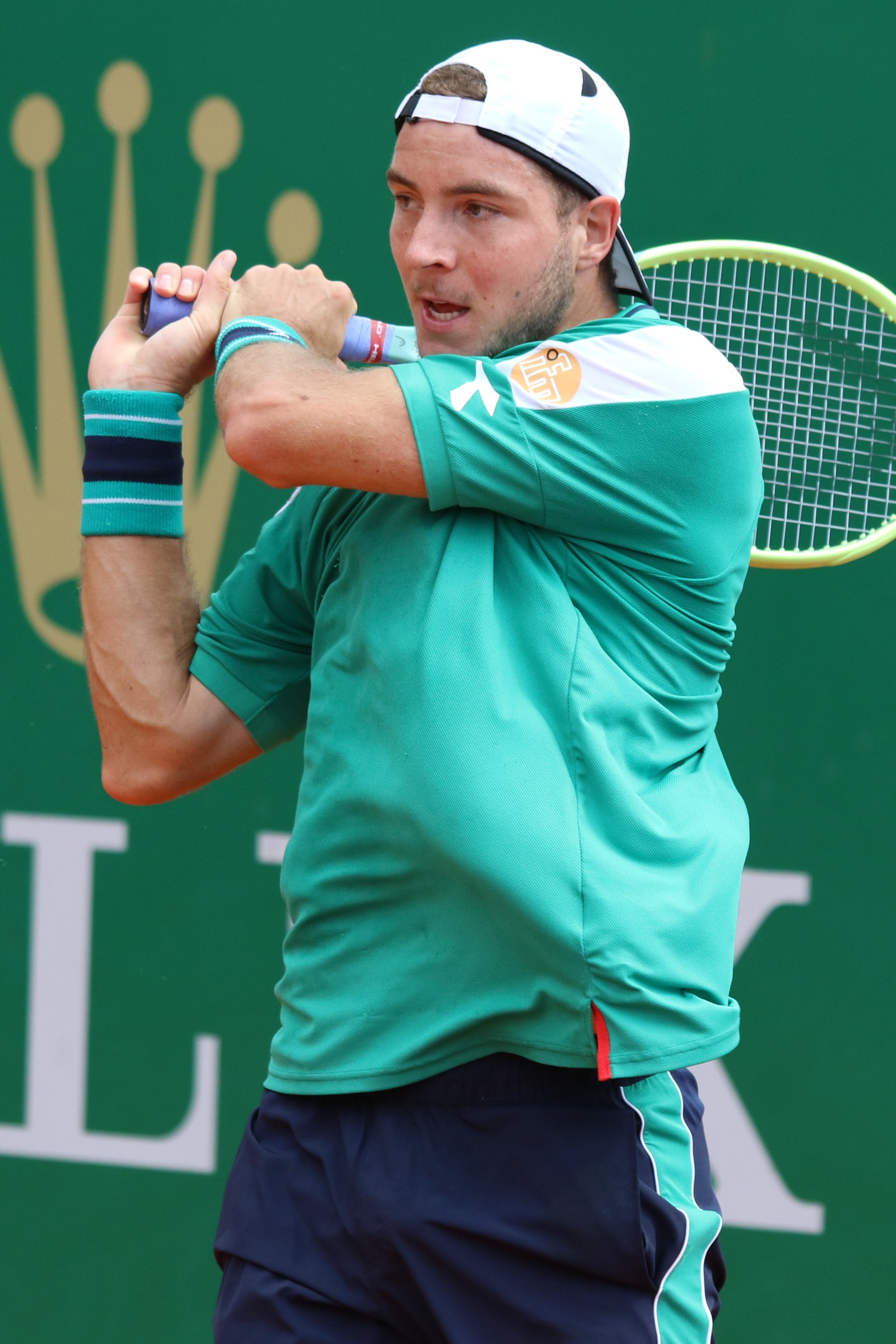
- Struff at the 2023 Monte-Carlo Masters
- Country (sports): Germany
- Residence: Warstein, Germany
- Born: 25 April 1990 (age 36) Warstein, West Germany
- Height: 1.93 m (6 ft 4 in)
- Turned pro: 2009
- Plays: Right-handed (two-handed backhand)
- Coach: Markus Wislsperger, Uwe Liedtke
- Prize money: US $15,166,798

Singles
- Career record: 260–286
- Career titles: 1
- Highest ranking: No. 21 (19 June 2023)
- Current ranking: No. 37 (9 November 2026)

Grand Slam singles results
- Australian Open: 2R (2018, 2024)
- French Open: 4R (2019, 2021)
- Wimbledon: QF (2026)
- US Open: 4R (2025)

Other tournaments
- Olympic Games: 2R (2021, 2024)

Doubles
- Career record: 109–114
- Career titles: 5
- Highest ranking: No. 21 (22 October 2018)
- Current ranking: No. 279 (31 August 2026)

Grand Slam doubles results
- Australian Open: SF (2018)
- French Open: 3R (2021)
- Wimbledon: QF (2018)
- US Open: 2R (2014, 2026)

Other doubles tournaments
- Olympic Games: QF (2021, 2024)

Team competitions
- Davis Cup: SF (2021, 2024, 2025)
- Last updated on: 31 August 2026.

Jan-Lennard Struff (German pronunciation: [ʃtʁʊf]; born 25 April 1990) is a German professional tennis player. He has a career-high ATP singles ranking of world No. 21, achieved on 19 June 2023. He also reached a best doubles ranking of No. 21 on 22 October 2018. He is currently the No. 2 German singles player.

Struff became the third oldest first-time ATP champion (since the inception of the ATP Tour in 1990) in 2024 at the age of 33, when he won his first ATP singles title by beating third seeded Taylor Fritz in straight sets in the final of the BMW Open.

== Career ==
=== 2014: First two ATP semifinals, top 50 debut ===
Struff advanced to his first semifinals on the ATP Tour in Marseille, Munich and Metz. He entered the top 50 in the ATP rankings for the first time in his career and finished the year in the top 100 also for the first time at World No. 59.

=== 2015: Davis Cup debut ===
Struff made his Davis Cup debut for Germany against France in the first round. He lost the first rubber to Gilles Simon with 8–10 in the fifth set, and his team lost the tie with 2–3.

=== 2016: First ATP 1000 third round, top-3 win ===
Struff reached the third round of the Paris Masters as a qualifier, his best showing at the Masters 1000 level thus far, after beating world No. 3 Stan Wawrinka, saving a match point.

=== 2017: Two ATP semifinals ===
Struff reached the semifinals of both Winston-Salem and St. Petersburg.

=== 2018: Australian Open doubles semifinal, first doubles title ===
Struff got to the semifinals in the Australian Open men's doubles in partnership with Ben McLachlan, including a win over the No. 1 seeds Łukasz Kubot and Marcelo Melo.

At the 2018 Wimbledon Championships, he reached the quarterfinals in doubles, also partnering with McLachlan, where they lost to the wildcard pair of Frederik Nielsen and Joe Salisbury.

In Tokyo, Struff defeated Marin Čilić and had a match point in the second set of his quarterfinal encounter against Denis Shapovalov. At the same tournament, he won the first title of his career in doubles, partnering again with McLachlan.

=== 2019: Top-3 win, French Open fourth round ===
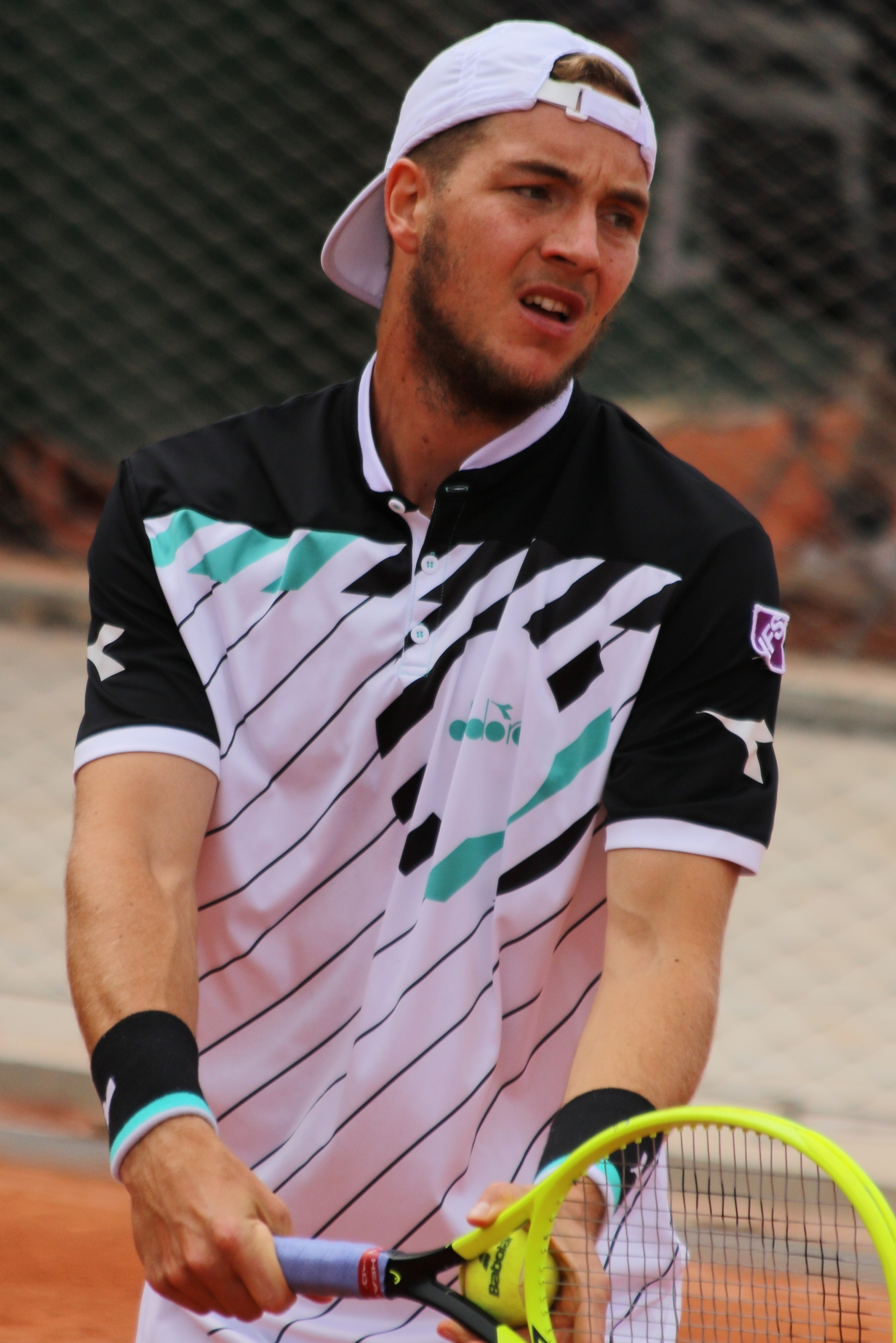
Struff at the 2019 French Open

Struff started his 2019 season at the Brisbane International. He lost in the first round to Jérémy Chardy. At the ASB Classic in Auckland, he upset fourth seed and world No. 24, Pablo Carreño Busta, in the quarterfinals. He was defeated in the semifinals by British wildcard Cameron Norrie. However, in doubles, he and his partner, Ben McLachlan, won the title, beating Raven Klaasen and Michael Venus in the final. Ranked 51 at the Australian Open, he lost in the first round to Australian Matthew Ebden in four sets.

In February, Struff competed at the Sofia Open. He lost in the second round to second seed and world No. 12, Stefanos Tsitsipas. In Rotterdam, he fell in the first round of qualifying to Dutch wildcard Ryan Nijboer. At the Dubai Championships, he stunned seventh seed and world No. 14, Milos Raonic, in the first round. He was defeated in the second round by Márton Fucsovics. In doubles, he and Ben McLachlan reached the final where they lost to Joe Salisbury and Rajeev Ram. At the Indian Wells Masters, he upset world No. 3 and compatriot, Alexander Zverev, in the third round. He was eliminated from the tournament in the fourth round by 13th seed and world No. 14, Milos Raonic. In Miami, he lost in the first round to American qualifier Reilly Opelka.

Struff started his clay-court season at the Monte-Carlo Masters. He upset 15th seed and world No. 20, Denis Shapovalov, in the first round. He lost in the second round to Grigor Dimitrov. In Barcelona, he beat 10th seed and world No. 22, David Goffin, in the second round. He upset fifth seed and world No. 8, Stefanos Tsitsipas, in the third round for his second Top 10 win of the season. He was defeated in his quarterfinal match by top seed, world No. 2, and eleven-time champion, Rafael Nadal. At the BMW Open in Munich, he lost in the first round to Brazilian qualifier Thiago Monteiro. In Madrid, he was defeated in the second round by ninth seed Marin Čilić. At the Italian Open, he upset ninth seed and world No. 10, Marin Čilić, in the second round. He was eliminated in the third round by world No. 6 Kei Nishikori. Ranked 45 at the French Open, he upset 20th seed and world No. 24, Denis Shapovalov, in the first round. In the third round, he upset 13th seed and world No. 15, Borna Ćorić, in a third round thriller which lasted four-hour-22-minutes. With his third round victory over Ćorić, he reached the fourth round for the first time. He fell in his fourth-round match to world No. 1, Novak Djokovic.

Struff started his grass-court season at the Stuttgart Open. He beat eighth seed and world No. 25, Denis Shapovalov, in the first round. He reached the semifinals where he lost to Matteo Berrettini. In Halle, he was defeated in the second round by third seed and world No. 9, Karen Khachanov. Seeded 33rd at Wimbledon, he made it to the third round, where he lost to Mikhail Kukushkin.

Seeded seventh at the Hamburg Open, Struff lost in the second round to Pablo Carreño Busta.

Seeded 14th at the Citi Open, Struff lost in the second round to Jordan Thompson. At the Rogers Cup in Montreal, he was defeated in the second round by 13th seed and world No. 17, Nikoloz Basilashvili. In Cincinnati, he stunned fifth seed and world No. 7, Stefanos Tsitsipas, in the second round in a tight three-set match. He lost in the third round to ninth seed and world No. 8, and eventual champion, Daniil Medvedev. Ranked 37 at the US Open, he was beaten in the second round by world No. 14 John Isner.

Seeded eighth at the Moselle Open, Struff lost in the first round to Pierre-Hugues Herbert. In Tokyo, he was defeated in the first round by Japanese wildcard Go Soeda. At the Shanghai Masters, he was eliminated from the tournament in the first round by 11th seed and world No. 13, Matteo Berrettini. Seeded seventh at the European Open, he lost in the second round to Frances Tiafoe. At the Swiss Indoors, he reached the quarterfinals where he was defeated by eventual finalist Alex de Minaur. At the Paris Masters, he upset world No. 8 and defending champion, Karen Khachanov, in the second round for the seventh Top 10 win of his career. He lost in the third round to Jo-Wilfried Tsonga in three sets.

=== 2020: Top 30 debut ===
Struff started his 2020 season by representing Germany at the 1st edition of the ATP Cup. Germany was in Group F alongside Australia, Greece, and Canada. Against Australia, he lost to Nick Kyrgios. Against Greece, he won his match over Michail Pervolarakis. Against Canada, he got the victory over Félix Auger-Aliassime. In the end, Germany ended 3rd in Group F. Seeded seventh at the first edition of the Adelaide International, he lost in the second round to Australian wildcard Alex Bolt. Ranked 37 at the Australian Open, he was defeated in the first round by world No. 2, seven-time champion, and eventual champion, Novak Djokovic, in four sets.

At the Rotterdam Open, Struff lost in the first round to eventual finalist, Félix Auger-Aliassime, in three sets. However, in doubles, he and his partner, Henri Kontinen, reached the final where they lost to Pierre-Hugues Herbert and Nicolas Mahut. In Dubai, he upset fifth seed, world No. 12, and 2018 champion, Roberto Bautista Agut, in the first round. He reached the quarterfinals where he fell to second seed, world No. 6, last year finalist, and eventual finalist, Stefanos Tsitsipas, in three sets. Representing Germany in the Davis Cup tie against Belarus, he won both of his rubbers by beating Ilya Ivashka and Egor Gerasimov. Germany ended up winning the tie over Belarus 4-1. The ATP Tour cancelled all tournaments from March through July due to the COVID-19 pandemic.

When the ATP Tour resumed tournament play in August, Struff competed at the Western & Southern Open. This event usually takes place in Cincinnati but this year, it was held at the USTA Billie Jean King National Tennis Center in New York City in order to reduce unnecessary player travel by centralizing the tournament and the subsequent US Open in the same venue. He upset 12th seed and world No. 17, Denis Shapovalov, in the second round. He then upset seventh seed and world No. 10, David Goffin, in the third round to earn his best ATP Masters 1000 showing by reaching the quarterfinals. He ended up losing his quarterfinal match to world No. 1, 2018 champion, and eventual champion, Novak Djokovic. As a result, he entered the top 30 for the first time in his career and reached a career-high in singles of World No. 29 on 31 August 2020. Seeded 28th at the US Open, he made it to the third round where he was defeated by three-time champion Djokovic.

At the Italian Open, Struff lost in the first round to qualifier Federico Coria. In Hamburg, he was defeated in the first round by eighth seed and world No. 16, Karen Khachanov. Seeded 30th at the French Open, he was eliminated from the tournament in the second round by qualifier and compatriot, Daniel Altmaier.

Seeded seventh at the Bett1Hulks Indoors, Struff lost in the first round to qualifier and compatriot, Oscar Otte. Seeded seventh at the Bett1Hulks Championship, he was defeated in the second round by Yoshihito Nishioka. In Vienna, he was beaten in the first round by third seed and world No. 5, Stefanos Tsitsipas. At the Paris Masters, he lost in the second round to ninth seed and world No. 15, Pablo Carreño Busta. Struff played his final tournament of the season at the Sofia Open. Seeded fourth, he lost in the second round to eventual finalist Vasek Pospisil.

Struff ended the year ranked No. 36.

=== 2021: ATP Cup semifinalist, first ATP Tour final ===
Struff started his 2021 season at the Antalya Open. Seeded fifth, he reached the quarterfinals where he lost to Jérémy Chardy, despite having two match points in the third-set tie breaker. In February, he represented Germany with Alexander Zverev, Kevin Krawietz and Andreas Mies at the ATP Cup. Germany was in Group A alongside Canada and Serbia. He beat Milos Raonic of Canada, and Dušan Lajović of Serbia to help Germany qualify for the semifinals. In the semifinal tie against Russia, he lost to Andrey Rublev in three sets. In the end, Russia beat Germany 2-1 to advance to the ATP Cup final. At the Australian Open, he lost in the first round to Australian wildcard Christopher O'Connell.

Seeded eighth at the Open Sud de France, Struff was defeated in the first round by qualifier and compatriot, Peter Gojowczyk. In Rotterdam, he was beaten in the first round by sixth seed, world No. 14, and 2017 finalist, David Goffin. At the Dubai Championships, he lost in the second round to third seed and world No. 12, Denis Shapovalov. Seeded 31st at the Miami Open, he made it to the third round where he was eliminated by seventh seed and world No. 12, Roberto Bautista Agut.

Struff started his clay-court season at the Sardegna Open. Seeded fifth, he reached the quarterfinals where he fell to fourth seed Nikoloz Basilashvili. In Monte-Carlo, he lost in the first round to 14th seed and world No. 17, Grigor Dimitrov. Seeded seventh at the BMW Open in Munich, he reached his first ATP singles final after defeating fourth seed, Filip Krajinović, in the quarterfinals, after a three hour match, and qualifier, Ilya Ivashka, in the semifinals. This was his best performance at this tournament since reaching the semifinals in 2014 (l. to Fabio Fognini). He lost in the final to fifth seed Nikoloz Basilashvili. At the Madrid Open, he was eliminated from the tournament in the first round by qualifier Alexei Popyrin. In Rome, he lost in the second round to world No. 7, Andrey Rublev, in three sets. Seeded fourth at the first edition of the Emilia-Romagna Open in Parma, Italy, he reached the quarterfinals where he lost to sixth seed Tommy Paul. Ranked 42 at the French Open, he upset world No. 7, Andrey Rublev, in the first round in five sets. He proceeded to the fourth round after wins over Facundo Bagnis and qualifier Carlos Alcaraz. He lost in the fourth round to world No. 10 Diego Schwartzman.

Struff began his grass-court season at the Halle Open. He stunned top seed and world No. 2, Daniil Medvedev, in the first round. He lost in the second round to qualifier, Marcos Giron, in three sets. At the first edition of the Mallorca Championships, he was defeated in the first round by Adrian Mannarino. Ranked No. 45 at Wimbledon, he lost in the first round to world No. 2, Daniil Medvedev, in four sets.

After Wimbledon, Struff competed at the Hamburg European Open. Seeded seventh, he lost in the first round to Laslo Djere. Representing Germany at the Summer Olympics, he was defeated in the second round by world No. 1 Novak Djokovic.

At the National Bank Open in Toronto, Struff lost in the first round to Fabio Fognini. In Cincinnati, he was beaten in the first round by lucky loser and compatriot, Dominik Koepfer. Seeded ninth at the Winston-Salem Open, he lost in the third round to eventual champion Ilya Ivashka. At the US Open, he was defeated in the first round by Tallon Griekspoor in five sets.

At the Moselle Open in Metz, Struff was beaten in the first round by Mikael Ymer. In October, he competed at the Indian Wells Masters. He lost in the second round to 25th seed and world No. 30, Fabio Fognini. At the European Open in Antwerp, he was eliminated in the second round by seventh seed Lloyd Harris. In St. Petersburg, Russia, he upset second seed and world No. 13, Denis Shapovalov, in the quarterfinals. He lost his semifinal match to fifth seed and world No. 28, Taylor Fritz. At the Paris Masters, he fell in the first round to qualifier Tommy Paul. In his final tournament of the season, Struff represented Germany at the Davis Cup Finals. Germany was in Group F alongside Serbia and Austria. Against Serbia, he lost to Novak Djokovic. Against Serbia, he beat Dennis Novak. Germany beat Serbia and Austria 2-1 to advance to the quarterfinals. Playing Great Britain in the quarterfinals, he defeated Cameron Norrie in three sets. Germany beat Great Britain 2-1 to advance to the semifinals. In the semifinals against Russia, he lost to Daniil Medvedev. Germany ended up losing to Russia 1-2.

Struff ended the year ranked No. 51.

=== 2022: Injury, Challenger title, top 150 ===
Struff began his 2022 season by representing Germany at the ATP Cup. Germany was in Group C alongside Canada, Great Britain, and the USA. In his first match, he lost to Dan Evans of Great Britain. In his second match, he defeated John Isner of the USA. In his final match, he lost to Denis Shapovalov of Canada. Germany ended in third place in Group C. At the Adelaide International 2, he lost in the first round to qualifier Corentin Moutet. Ranked No. 52 at the Australian Open, he was defeated in the first round by Botic van de Zandschulp.

In February, Struff competed at the Dubai Championships. He lost in the first round to qualifier Ričardas Berankis. Representing Germany in the Davis Cup tie against Brazil, he played one match and lost to Thiago Monteiro. In the end, Germany won the tie over Brazil 3–1. At the Indian Wells Masters, he fell in the first round to lucky loser John Millman. Seeded fourth at the Arizona Tennis Classic, an ATP Challenger event, he was eliminated in the first round by lucky loser and compatriot, Mats Moraing. However, in doubles, he and his partner Oscar Otte reached the final and lost to Treat Huey and Denis Kudla. At the Miami Open, Struff retired during his first-round match against Pedro Martínez due to a right foot injury. Due to that injury, Struff missed these clay-court tournaments: Grand Prix Hassan II, Barcelona Open, BMW Open, Geneva Open, and French Open.

Struff returned to action during the grass-court season in June at the BOSS Open in Stuttgart. Playing as a wildcard, he won his first match since January by beating Marcos Giron in the first round in three sets. He lost in the second round to sixth seed Lorenzo Sonego. In Halle, he was defeated in the first round by Ilya Ivashka. At the Mallorca Championships, he fell in the first round of qualifying to Fernando Verdasco. Ranked No. 155 at Wimbledon, he faced fifth seed and world No. 7, Carlos Alcaraz, in the first round. He pushed Alcaraz to five sets, but he ended up losing the match.

After Wimbledon, Struff competed at the Brawo Open, an ATP Challenger event in Braunschweig, Germany. He won his 6th ATP Challenger tour title by beating compatriot, Maximilian Marterer, in the final. He returned to the top 150 at world No. 126 on 11 July 2022. He also won the doubles title with Marcelo Demoliner by defeating Roman Jebavý and Adam Pavlásek in the final. In Hamburg, he lost in the first round to seventh seed and world No. 26, Karen Khachanov, in three sets, despite having two match points at 6-5 in the third set. Seeded third at the first edition of the Zug Open, he was eliminated from the tournament in the second round by Italian qualifier Lorenzo Giustino. Seeded third at the Meerbusch Challenger, he was beaten in the second round by eventual finalist Dennis Novak. At the US Open, Struff fell in the second round of qualifying to Enzo Couacaud.

After the US Open, Struff competed at the Cassis Open. Seeded fifth, he lost in the second round to Borna Gojo. Then, he represented Germany in the Davis Cup Finals Group stage. Germany was in Group C alongside France, Belgium, and Australia. He beat Benjamin Bonzi of France, Zizou Bergs of Belgium, and Max Purcell of Australia. Germany did end up beating France, Belgium, and Australia which earned them a spot in the Knockout stage. Getting past qualifying at the Sofia Open, he reached the quarterfinals where he was defeated by fourth seed Lorenzo Musetti. In Basel, he lost in the first round of qualifying to Roman Safiullin. At the Trofeo Faip–Perrel, he made it to the final where he was defeated by Otto Virtanen. At the Slovak Open, he lost in the first round to eventual finalist Fábián Marozsán. Struff played his final event of the year by representing Germany in the Davis Cup quarterfinal tie against Canada. He upset world No. 18 Denis Shapovalov. In the end, Germany ended up losing 2-1 to Canada.

Struff ended the year ranked No. 151.

=== 2023: First lucky loser ATP 1000 finalist, German No. 1 ===
In January, Struff started his 2023 season at the Canberra Challenger. He reached the semifinals where he lost to Leandro Riedi. Struff qualified for his ninth career-appearance in the main draw at the Australian Open.

He qualified for four back-to-back Masters 1000 at the Indian Wells Open, at the Miami Open and at the Monte-Carlo Masters where he reached the second round defeating Quentin Halys, Fabio Fognini and Albert Ramos Viñolas respectively. He returned to the top 100 on 3 April 2023. In Monte Carlo, he went one step further reaching the round of 16 with a defeat over 14th seed Alex de Minaur. Next, he upset fourth seed Casper Ruud, for his fourth top-5 win and first top-10 win since June 2021, reaching the quarterfinals for the second time at the Masters 1000-level in his career, which moved him into the top 65 in the rankings.

At the Madrid Open, he qualified for his fourth consecutive Masters as a lucky loser, where he reached also the second round defeating Lorenzo Sonego. Next he upset 32nd seed Ben Shelton to reach the third round. He reached the round of 16 with a win over Dušan Lajović. He made back to back Masters 1000 quarterfinals, and only his third in his career, defeating Pedro Cachin. He reached the semifinals of a Masters for the first time in his career upsetting fourth seed Stefanos Tsitsipas for his second top-5 win of the season. He became the third lucky loser to advance to the semifinals of a Masters event, joining Thomas Johansson (2004 Toronto) and Lucas Pouille (2016 Rome). He then won his semifinal match against qualifier Aslan Karatsev, the player to whom he lost to in the qualifying rounds, and became the first lucky loser to reach a Masters final in history. In the final, he lost to world No. 2 and defending champion Carlos Alcaraz in three sets. As a result he moved back into the top 30 in the rankings at a new career high ranking of No. 28 and became the German No. 1 ahead of Alexander Zverev following the Rome Masters on 22 May 2023. Despite this, he lost to Jiří Lehečka in the first round of the French Open.

Struff reached his second final of the season in Stuttgart after beating Zhang Zhizhen, 7th seed Tommy Paul, Richard Gasquet and top seed Hubert Hurkacz. He lost to Frances Tiafoe in 3 sets in the final despite holding a championship point in the third set. As a result, he entered the top 25 at world no. 21 at the end of the week. Struff then played in Halle, where he beat Roman Safiullin before losing to eventual champion Alexander Bublik. He announced that due to an injured hip, he would not play in Wimbledon. Eventually he also skipped the next Major, the US Open. After a three months break he returned to the Asian swing at the Zhuhai Championships where he lost to eventual finalist Yoshihito Nishioka in the quarterfinals. He won his first round match, snapping a four-match losing streak, at the Swiss Indoors in Basel defeating Christopher Eubanks. At the Sofia Open, he reached his 12th career semifinal defeating Fabian Marozsan.

Struff ended the year ranked No. 25 and was awarded the ATP Comeback Player of the Year for his performance in 2023.

=== 2024: First ATP singles title, second ATP 500 doubles title ===
Struff began his year in Hong Kong, beating Marin Čilić in 3 tiebreak sets after saving 7 match points before losing, again in 3 tiebreak sets, to Sebastian Ofner in the second round. As the 24th seed, he won his first match in 6 years at the Australian Open, beating Rinky Hijikata in 5 sets, but lost to Miomir Kecmanović in the second round.

In Rotterdam, Struff reached the round of 16, defeating Alejandro Davidovich Fokina, before losing to Emil Ruusuvuori. At his next tournaments, Struff had less success in singles, losing in the first round of Doha to Christopher O'Connell and in Dubai Tennis Championships to Hubert Hurkacz. However, he won his second ATP 500 doubles title at the Dubai Tennis Championships with Tallon Griekspoor.

He made a back-to-back appearance in the third round of Indian Wells, where he beat Borna Ćorić but lost to Jannik Sinner. In Miami, he defeated Daniel Altmaier but lost to Alex de Minaur. In the beginning of the clay court season in Monte-Carlo, he reached the third round by defeating Sebastián Báez and Borna Ćorić before again losing to Jannik Sinner.

In Munich, as the fourth seed, Struff beat two-time defending finalist Botic van de Zandschulp, Félix Auger-Aliassime and two-time defending champion Holger Rune to reach his fourth career final. At age 33, Struff won his first ATP singles title by beating third seed Taylor Fritz in straight sets in the final, becoming the third oldest first-time champion since the inception of the ATP Tour in 1990, after Paolo Lorenzi and Víctor Estrella Burgos, and the first since Lorenzi in 2016 Kitzbühel. He also reached the final of the doubles event, partnering Andreas Mies, where he lost to Yuki Bhambri and Albano Olivetti.

=== 2025: Disappointing start of the year, back to top 100 ===
Struff had a disappointing start of the year after struggling with injuries in the last two years. This resulted him in dropping out of top 100 in the ATP rankings.

In August, Struff qualified for the main draw at the 2025 US Open. With wins over Botic van de Zandschulp, Holger Rune and Frances Tiafoe he reached the round of 16 where he lost in straight sets to Novak Djokovic. This run enabled him to climb back to top 100 in the ATP rankings.

=== 2026: Wimbledon quarterfinal, ATP 500 semifinal, back to top 40 ===
In July, Struff reached his first major quarterfinal at Wimbledon, after defeating Hubert Hurkacz in the fourth round. At age 36, he became the oldest player in the Open Era to reach his first major quarterfinal. He lost in the quarterfinal to top seed Jannik Sinner.

Struff had a successful indoor hard court season. In Brussels, he reached his fourth career final, upsetting world no. 10 Arthur Fils in the semifinals on the way there. He lost in the final to Tallon Griekspoor, but received a Special Exemption into Basel and skipped qualifying for the tournament. There, he defeated Novak Djokovic for the first time in eight attempts, then beat Nuno Borges to reach his first ATP 500-level semifinal, where he lost to Jiří Lehečka. As a result of this, Struff returned to the world's top 40, and for the second week in a row, Struff received another Special Exemption into the Paris Masters.

== Performance timelines ==
Key
W	F	SF	QF	#R	RR	Q#	P#	DNQ	A	Z#	PO	G	S	B	NMS	NTI	P	NH

(W) winner; (F) finalist; (SF) semifinalist; (QF) quarterfinalist; (#R) rounds 4, 3, 2, 1; (RR) round-robin stage; (Q#) qualification round; (P#) preliminary round; (DNQ) did not qualify; (A) absent; (Z#) Davis/Fed Cup Zonal Group (with number indication) or (PO) play-off; (G) gold, (S) silver or (B) bronze Olympic/Paralympic medal; (NMS) not a Masters tournament; (NTI) not a Tier I tournament; (P) postponed; (NH) not held; (SR) strike rate (events won / competed); (W–L) win–loss record.
To avoid confusion and double counting, these charts are updated at the conclusion of a tournament or when the player's participation has ended.

=== Singles ===
Current through the 2026 Paris Masters.

Tournament	2011	2012	2013	2014	2015	2016	2017	2018	2019	2020	2021	2022	2023	2024	2025	2026	SR	W–L	Win %
Grand Slam tournaments
Australian Open	A	A	Q3	1R	1R	Q2	1R	2R	1R	1R	1R	1R	1R	2R	1R	1R	0 / 12	2–12	14%
French Open	A	A	1R	2R	1R	1R	1R	2R	4R	2R	4R	A	1R	3R	1R	2R	0 / 13	12–13	48%
Wimbledon	A	A	2R	1R	1R	1R	1R	3R	3R	NH	1R	1R	A	3R	3R	QF	0 / 12	13–12	52%
US Open	Q1	A	1R	2R	Q2	1R	1R	3R	2R	3R	1R	Q2	A	1R	4R	2R	0 / 11	10–11	48%
Win–loss	0–0	0–0	1–3	2–4	0–3	0–3	0–4	6–4	6–4	3–3	3–4	0–2	0–2	5–4	5–4	6–4	0 / 48	37–48	44%
National representation
Summer Olympics	NH	A	not held			1R	not held				2R	not held		2R	not held		0 / 3	2–2	50%
Davis Cup	A	A	A	A	1R	PO	PO	QF	QF	QR	SF	QF	A	SF	SF	QF	0 / 7	17–12	59%
ATP 1000 tournaments
Indian Wells Open	A	A	A	A	1R	A	2R	1R	4R	NH	2R	1R	2R	3R	1R	1R	0 / 10	7–10	41%
Miami Open	A	A	Q2	Q2	2R	A	3R	1R	1R	NH	3R	1R	2R	3R	1R	1R	0 / 10	6–10	38%
Monte-Carlo Masters	A	A	A	Q1	1R	1R	3R	3R	2R	NH	1R	A	QF	3R	1R	Q1	0 / 9	10–9	53%
Madrid Open	A	A	A	A	A	A	A	2R	2R	NH	1R	A	F	4R	2R	2R	0 / 7	12–7	63%
Italian Open	A	A	A	A	A	A	2R	A	3R	1R	2R	A	A	2R	A	2R	0 / 6	6–6	50%
Canadian Open	A	A	A	A	A	A	A	A	2R	NH	1R	A	A	A	A	1R	0 / 3	1–3	25%
Cincinnati Open	A	A	A	A	A	A	A	A	3R	QF	1R	A	A	1R	Q1	2R	0 / 5	6–5	55%
Shanghai Masters	A	A	A	A	A	A	3R	A	1R	not held			2R	A	A	2R	0 / 4	3–4	43%
Paris Masters	A	A	A	Q1	Q2	3R	1R	Q1	3R	2R	1R	A	1R	2R	A	3R	0 / 8	8–8	50%
Win–loss	0–0	0–0	0–0	0–0	1–3	2–2	8–6	3–4	12–9	4–3	3–8	0–2	11–6	8–7	1–4	6–8	0 / 62	59–62	49%
Career statistics
	2011	2012	2013	2014	2015	2016	2017	2018	2019	2020	2021	2022	2023	2024	2025	2026	Career		
Tournaments	0	0	9	17	18	18	28	24	27	14	27	10	17	22	21	22	Career total: 274		
Titles	0	0	0	0	0	0	0	0	0	0	0	0	0	1	0	0	Career total: 1		
Finals	0	0	0	0	0	0	0	0	0	0	1	0	2	1	0	1	Career total: 5		
Hard win–loss	0–0	0–0	1–3	9–8	5–9	7–9	16–15	13–14	18–19	14–12	14–19	7–8	6–10	9–14	9–13	15–14	0 / 153	143–167	46%
Clay win–loss	0–0	0–0	2–4	5–6	0–7	5–6	11–11	8–8	11–7	1–3	11–8	0–2	9–5	15–5	3–7	4–5	1 / 84	85–84	50%
Grass win–loss	0–0	0–0	1–2	1–3	0–3	1–3	1–3	2–3	6–3	0–0	1–3	1–3	5–2	6–2	3–3	6–3	0 / 37	34–36	49%
Overall win–loss	0–0	0–0	4–9	15–17	5–19	13–18	28–29	23–25	35–29	15–15	26–30	8–13	20–17	30–21	15–23	25–22	1 / 274	262–287	48%
Win %	–	–	31%	47%	21%	42%	49%	48%	55%	50%	46%	38%	54%	59%	39%	53%	Career total: 48%		
Year-end ranking (Note: Year-end ranking 2009: 702, 2010: 359)	239	168	107	59	107	63	53	57	35	36	51	151	25	42	83				

=== Doubles ===
Current through the 2026 US Open.

Tournament	2012	2013	2014	2015	2016	2017	2018	2019	2020	2021	2022	2023	2024	2025	2026	SR	W–L	Win %
Grand Slam tournaments
Australian Open	A	A	A	1R	A	1R	SF	1R	QF	A	2R	A	A	A	A	0 / 6	8–6	57%
French Open	A	A	A	1R	A	2R	1R	1R	1R	3R	A	1R	A	A	A	0 / 7	3–7	30%
Wimbledon	A	A	2R	A	2R	1R	QF	1R	NH	A	A	A	A	A	1R	0 / 6	5–5	50%
US Open	A	A	2R	A	A	1R	1R	1R	1R	1R	A	A	A	A	2R	0 / 7	2–7	22%
Win–loss	0–0	0–0	2–2	0–2	1–1	1–4	7–4	0–4	3–3	2–2	1–1	0–1	0–0	0–0	1–1	0 / 26	18–25	42%
National representation
Summer Olympics	A	not held			A	not held				QF	not held		QF	not held		0 / 2	4–2	67%
Davis Cup	A	A	A	1R	PO	PO	QF	QF	QR	SF	QF	A	SF	SF	QF	0 / 7	4–0	100%
ATP 1000 tournaments
Indian Wells Open	A	A	A	A	A	A	A	2R	NH	2R	A	A	A	A	A	0 / 2	2–2	50%
Miami Open	A	A	A	A	A	A	SF	A	NH	1R	A	A	A	A	A	0 / 2	3–2	60%
Monte-Carlo Masters	A	A	A	A	A	A	A	1R	NH	1R	A	A	A	QF	A	0 / 3	2–3	40%
Madrid Open	A	A	A	A	A	A	QF	1R	NH	A	A	A	A	A	A	0 / 2	2–2	50%
Italian Open	A	A	A	A	A	A	A	1R	2R	1R	A	A	A	A	A	0 / 3	1–3	25%
Canadian Open	A	A	A	A	A	A	A	1R	NH	1R	A	A	A	A	1R	0 / 3	0–3	0%
Cincinnati Open	A	A	A	A	A	A	A	A	1R	2R	A	A	A	A	A	0 / 2	1–2	33%
Shanghai Masters	A	A	A	A	A	A	2R	1R	not held			A	A	A	A	0 / 2	1–2	33%
Paris Masters	A	A	A	A	A	A	1R	2R	1R	A	A	A	A	A	A	0 / 3	1–3	25%
Win–loss	0–0	0–0	0–0	0–0	0–0	0–0	6–4	2–7	1–3	2–6	0–0	0–0	0–0	2–1	0–1	0 / 22	13–22	37%
Career statistics
	2012	2013	2014	2015	2016	2017	2018	2019	2020	2021	2022	2023	2024	2025	2026	Career		
Tournaments	1	1	7	10	5	13	22	21	8	12	4	5	3	4	5	Career total: 121		
Titles	0	0	0	0	0	0	1	2	0	0	0	0	1	0	1	Career total: 5		
Finals	0	0	0	0	0	0	2	3	1	0	0	0	2	0	1	Career total: 9		
Overall win–loss	0–1	0–1	4–7	4–10	4–5	3–12	34–21	20–19	9–8	11–13	3–4	3–5	9–2	2–4	4–3	5 / 121	110–115	49%
Win %	0%	0%	36%	29%	44%	20%	62%	51%	53%	46%	43%	38%	82%	33%	57%	Career total: 49%		
Year-end ranking	404	450	169	162	182	190	22	56	53	69	137	277	128	362				

== ATP Tour finals ==
=== Singles: 5 (1 title, 4 runner-ups) ===
Legend Grand Slam (–) ATP 1000 (0–1) ATP 500 (–) ATP 250 (1–3)	Finals by surface Hard (0–1) Clay (1–2) Grass (0–1)	Finals by setting Outdoor (1–3) Indoor (0–1)

Result	W–L	Date	Tournament	Tier	Surface	Opponent	Score
Loss	0–1	May 2021	Bavarian Championships, Germany	ATP 250	Clay	(Georgia (country)) Nikoloz Basilashvili	4–6, 6–7^{(5–7)}
Loss	0–2	May 2023	Madrid Open, Spain	ATP 1000	Clay	(Spain) Carlos Alcaraz	4–6, 6–3, 3–6
Loss	0–3	Jun 2023	Stuttgart Open, Germany	ATP 250	Grass	(United States) Frances Tiafoe	6–4, 6–7^{(1–7)}, 6–7^{(8–10)}
Win	1–3	Apr 2024	Bavarian Championships, Germany	ATP 250	Clay	(United States) Taylor Fritz	7–5, 6–3
Loss	1–4	Oct 2026	European Open, Belgium	ATP 250	Hard (i)	(Netherlands) Tallon Griekspoor	6–4, 3–6, 4–6

=== Doubles: 9 (5 titles, 4 runner-ups) ===
Legend Grand Slam (–) ATP 1000 (–) ATP 500 (2–2) ATP 250 (3–2)	Finals by surface Hard (4–3) Clay (0–1) Grass (1–0)	Finals by setting Outdoor (3–3) Indoor (2–1)

Result	W–L	Date	Tournament	Tier	Surface	Partner	Opponents	Score
Loss	0–1	Jan 2018	Sydney International, Australia	ATP 250	Hard	(Serbia) Viktor Troicki	(Poland) Łukasz Kubot (Brazil) Marcelo Melo	3–6, 4–6
Win	1–1	Oct 2018	Japan Open, Japan	ATP 500	Hard (i)	(Japan) Ben McLachlan	(South Africa) Raven Klaasen (New Zealand) Michael Venus	6–4, 7–5
Win	2–1	Jan 2019	Auckland Open, New Zealand	ATP 250	Hard	(Japan) Ben McLachlan	(South Africa) Raven Klaasen (New Zealand) Michael Venus	6–3, 6–4
Loss	2–2	Mar 2019	Dubai Championships, United Arab Emirates	ATP 500	Hard	(Japan) Ben McLachlan	(United States) Rajeev Ram (United Kingdom) Joe Salisbury	6–7^{(4–7)}, 3–6
Win	3–2	Sep 2019	Moselle Open, France	ATP 250	Hard (i)	(Sweden) Robert Lindstedt	(France) Nicolas Mahut (France) Édouard Roger-Vasselin	2–6, 7–6^{(7–1)}, [10–4]
Loss	3–3	Feb 2020	Rotterdam Open, Netherlands	ATP 500	Hard (i)	(Finland) Henri Kontinen	(France) Pierre-Hugues Herbert (France) Nicolas Mahut	6–7^{(5–7)}, 6–4, [7–10]
Win	4–3	Mar 2024	Dubai Championships, United Arab Emirates	ATP 500	Hard	(Netherlands) Tallon Griekspoor	(Croatia) Ivan Dodig (United States) Austin Krajicek	6–4, 4–6, [10–6]
Loss	4–4	Apr 2024	Bavarian Championships, Germany	ATP 250	Clay	(Germany) Andreas Mies	(India) Yuki Bhambri (France) Albano Olivetti	6–7^{(6–8)}, 6–7^{(5–7)}
Win	5–4	Jun 2026	Stuttgart Open, Germany	ATP 250	Grass	(Germany) Yannick Hanfmann	(Estonia) Daniil Glinka (Greece) Stefanos Sakellaridis	7–6^{(7–2)}, 3–6, [11–9]

== ATP Challenger Tour finals ==
=== Singles: 21 (7 titles, 14 runner-ups) ===
Finals by surface
Hard (3–7)
Clay (4–7)

Result	W–L	Date	Tournament	Surface	Opponent	Score
Loss	0–1	Jun 2011	Franken Challenge, Germany	Clay	(Portugal) João Sousa	2–6, 6–0, 2–6
Loss	0–2	Sep 2011	TEAN International, Netherlands	Clay	(Netherlands) Igor Sijsling	6–7^{(2–7)}, 3–6
Loss	0–3	Sep 2012	Torneo Omnia Ciudad Madrid, Spain	Clay	(Spain) Daniel Gimeno Traver	4–6, 2–6
Loss	0–4	Nov 2012	GB Pro-Series Loughborough, UK	Hard (i)	(Russia) Evgeny Donskoy	2–6, 6–4, 1–6
Loss	0–5	Jan 2013	Intersport Heilbronn Open, Germany	Hard (i)	(Germany) Michael Berrer	5–7, 3–6
Loss	0–6	Feb 2013	Trofeo Faip–Perrel, Italy	Hard (i)	(Poland) Michał Przysiężny	6–4, 6–7^{(5–7)}, 6–7^{(5–7)}
Loss	0–7	Sep 2013	Geneva Open Challenger, Switzerland	Hard	(Tunisia) Malek Jaziri	4–6, 3–6
Loss	0–8	Feb 2014	Trofeo Faip–Perrel, Italy	Hard (i)	(Italy) Simone Bolelli	6–7^{(6–8)}, 6–4
Win	1–8	May 2014	Heilbronner Neckarcup, Germany	Clay	(Hungary) Márton Fucsovics	6–2, 7–6^{(7–5)}
Loss	1–9	Sep 2014	Szczecin Open, Poland	Clay	(Germany) Dustin Brown	4–6, 3–6
Win	2–9	Sep 2015	Pekao Szczecin Open, Poland	Clay	(Ukraine) Artem Smirnov	6–4, 6–3
Win	3–9	Oct 2015	Open d'Orléans, France	Hard (i)	(Poland) Jerzy Janowicz	5–7, 6–4, 6–3
Loss	3–10	May 2016	Heilbronner Neckarcup, Germany	Clay	(Georgia (country)) Nikoloz Basilashvili	4–6, 6–7^{(3–7)}
Loss	3–11	Jun 2016	Franken Challenge, Germany	Clay	(Moldova) Radu Albot	3–6, 4–6
Win	4–11	Sep 2016	TEAN International, Netherlands	Clay	(Netherlands) Robin Haase	6–4, 6–1
Win	5–11	Oct 2016	Ethias Trophy, Belgium	Hard	(France) Vincent Millot	6–2, 6–0
Loss	5–12	Jan 2017	Canberra Challenger, Australia	Hard	(Israel) Dudi Sela	6–3, 4–6, 3–6
Loss	5–13	Aug 2018	IsarOpen, Germany	Clay	(Portugal) Pedro Sousa	1–6, 3–6
Win	6–13	Jul 2022	Brawo Open, Germany	Clay	(Germany) Maximilian Marterer	6–2, 6–2
Loss	6–14	Nov 2022	Trofeo Faip–Perrel, Italy	Hard (i)	(Finland) Otto Virtanen	2–6, 5–7
Win	7–14	Nov 2025	All In Open, France	Hard (i)	(United Kingdom) Liam Broady	6–4, 6–4

=== Doubles: 9 (7 titles, 2 runner-ups) ===
Finals by surface
Hard (2–2)
Clay (5–0)

Result	W–L	Date	Tournament	Surface	Partner	Opponent	Score
Loss	0–1	Nov 2013	Slovak Open, Slovakia	Hard (i)	(Germany) Gero Kretschmer	(Finland) Henri Kontinen (Sweden) Andreas Siljeström	6–7^{(6–8)}, 2–6
Win	1–1	Sep 2014	Pekao Szczecin Open, Poland	Clay	(Germany) Dustin Brown	(Poland) Tomasz Bednarek (Slovakia) Igor Zelenay	6–2, 6–4
Win	2–1	Sep 2015	TEAN International, Netherlands	Clay	(Germany) Tobias Kamke	(Romania) Victor Hănescu (Romania) Adrian Ungur	7–6^{(7–1)}, 4–6, [10–7]
Win	3–1	Sep 2016	TEAN International, Netherlands (2)	Clay	(Germany) Daniel Masur	(Netherlands) Robin Haase (Netherlands) Boy Westerhof	6–4, 6–1
Win	4–1	Jan 2017	Canberra Challenger, Australia	Hard	(Germany) Andre Begemann	(Argentina) Carlos Berlocq (Argentina) Andrés Molteni	6–3, 6–4
Win	5–1	Sep 2017	AON Open Challenger, Italy	Clay	(Germany) Tim Pütz	(Argentina) Guido Andreozzi (Uruguay) Ariel Behar	7–6^{(7–5)}, 7–6^{(10–8)}
Loss	5–2	Mar 2022	Arizona Tennis Classic, United States	Hard	(Germany) Oscar Otte	(Philippines) Treat Huey (United States) Denis Kudla	6–7^{(10–12)}, 6–3, [6–10]
Win	6–2	Jul 2022	Brawo Open, Germany	Clay	(Brazil) Marcelo Demoliner	(Czech Republic) Roman Jebavý (Czech Republic) Adam Pavlásek	6–4, 7–5
Win	7–2	Nov 2022	Trofeo Faip–Perrel, Italy	Hard (i)	(Germany) Henri Squire	(France) Jonathan Eysseric (France) Albano Olivetti	6–4, 6–7^{(5–7)}, [10–7]

== ITF Futures finals ==
=== Singles: 10 (6 titles, 4 runner-ups) ===
Finals by surface
Hard (1–0)
Clay (5–3)
Carpet (0–1)

Result	W–L	Date	Tournament	Surface	Opponent	Score
Win	1–0	Jun 2010	Cologne F5, Germany	Clay	(Germany) Dennis Bloemke	7–6^{(7–5)}, 6–0
Loss	1–1	Aug 2010	Dortmund F10, Germany	Clay	(Bulgaria) Grigor Dimitrov	5–7, 5–7
Loss	1–2	Feb 2011	Nussloch F4, Germany	Carpet (i)	(Sweden) Ervin Eleskovic	5–7, 4–6
Win	2–2	Mar 2011	Barcelona F9, Spain	Clay	(Spain) Pedro Clar	6–4, 6–3
Loss	2–3	Apr 2011	Reus F10, Spain	Clay	(Spain) Pedro Clar	4–6, 3–6
Loss	2–4	Apr 2011	Vercelli F5, Italy	Clay	(Italy) Stefano Galvani	6–7^{(6–8)}, 0–6
Win	3–4	Jun 2012	Cologne F6, Germany	Clay	(Germany) Jeremy Jahn	7–6^{(7–4)}, 7–5
Win	4–4	Jul 2012	Dortmund F11, Germany	Clay	(Germany) Matthias Wunner	6–1, 6–4
Win	5–4	Aug 2012	Este F23, Italy	Clay	(Italy) Salvatore Caruso	6–7^{(3–7)}, 6–2, 6–2
Win	6–4	Oct 2012	Essen F19 Germany	Hard (i)	(Germany) Bastian Knittel	6–3, 6–2

=== Doubles: 9 (2 titles, 7 runner-ups) ===
Finals by surface
Hard (0–0)
Clay (2–7)

Result	W–L	Date	Tournament	Surface	Partner	Opponent	Score
Loss	0–1	Jul 2008	Erftstadt F12, Germany	Clay	(Germany) Patrick Pradella	(Germany) Martin Emmrich (Germany) Bastian Knittel	3–6, 2–6
Loss	0–2	Aug 2008	Wetzlar F13, Germany	Clay	(Germany) Patrick Pradella	(Netherlands) Roy Bruggeling (Netherlands) Bas van der Valk	5–7, 2–6
Loss	0–3	Aug 2009	Wetzlar F13, Germany	Clay	(Germany) Patrick Pradella	(Netherlands) Roy Bruggeling (Netherlands) Bas van der Valk	3–6, 4–6
Loss	0–4	Apr 2011	Reus F10, Spain	Clay	(Germany) Richard Waite	(Spain) Marc Fornell Mestres (Netherlands) Mike Vermeer	6–7^{(3–7)}, 7–6^{(7–1)}, [8–10]
Win	1–4	Apr 2012	Ajaccio F8, France	Clay	(Germany) Alexander Satschko	(France) Romain Jouan (Belgium) Yannick Mertens	0–6, 6–4, [10–7]
Loss	1–5	Jun 2012	Cologne F6, Germany	Clay	(Germany) Mattis Wetzel	(Australia) Alex Bolt (Australia) Andrew Whittington	1–6, 0–6
Loss	1–6	Jul 2012	Breda F3, Netherlands	Clay	(Germany) Patrick Pradella	(Netherlands) Matwé Middelkoop (Netherlands) Miliaan Niesten	2–6, 4–6
Loss	1–7	Jul 2012	Dortmund F10, Germany	Clay	(Germany) Patrick Pradella	(Mexico) Alejandro Moreno Figueroa (Mexico) Miguel Ángel Reyes-Varela	6–4, 4–6, [7–10]
Win	2–7	Aug 2012	Este F23, Italy	Clay	(Germany) Alexander Satschko	(Chile) Jorge Aguilar (Chile) Juan Carlos Sáez	4–6, 6–4, [10–7]

== Playing style ==
Struff is a power baseliner type player, frequently making use of serve and volley as well. He possesses a strong serve along with a heavy forehand and solid backhand. When he plays well he can dictate play from the back of the court and hit winners from the forehand and backhand side. He also has a solid volley.

== Wins over top 10 players ==
- Struff has a 16–52 record against players who were, at the time the match was played, ranked in the top 10.

Season	2016	2017	2018	2019	2020	2021	2022	2023	2024	2025	2026	Total
Wins	1	0	1	5	1	2	0	2	0	1	3	16

#	Player	Rk	Tournament	Surface	Rd	Score	Rk	Ref
2016
1.	(Switzerland) Stan Wawrinka	3	Paris Masters, France	Hard (i)	2R	3–6, 7–6^{(8–6)}, 7–6^{(7–1)}	91	
2018
2.	(Croatia) Marin Čilić	6	Japan Open, Japan	Hard (i)	1R	3–6, 6–4, 7–6^{(7–1)}	56	
2019
3.	(Germany) Alexander Zverev	3	Indian Wells Open, United States	Hard	3R	6–3, 6–1	55	
4.	(Greece) Stefanos Tsitsipas	8	Barcelona Open, Spain	Clay	3R	6–4, 3–6, 6–2	51	
5.	(Croatia) Marin Čilić	10	Italian Open, Italy	Clay	2R	6–2, 6–3	51	
6.	(Greece) Stefanos Tsitsipas	7	Cincinnati Open, United States	Hard	2R	6–4, 6–7^{(5–7)}, 7–6^{(8–6)}	36	
7.	(Russia) Karen Khachanov	8	Paris Masters, France	Hard (i)	2R	7–6^{(7–5)}, 3–6, 7–5	36	
2020
8.	(Belgium) David Goffin	10	Cincinnati Open, United States	Hard	3R	6–4, 3–6, 6–4	34	
2021
9.	(Russia) Andrey Rublev	7	French Open, France	Clay	1R	6–3, 7–6^{(8–6)}, 4–6, 3–6, 6–4	42	
10.	(Russia) Daniil Medvedev	2	Halle Open, Germany	Grass	1R	7–6^{(8–6)}, 6–3	45	
2023
11.	(Norway) Casper Ruud	4	Monte-Carlo Masters, France	Clay	3R	6–1, 7–6^{(8–6)}	100	
12.	(Greece) Stefanos Tsitsipas	5	Madrid Open, Spain	Clay	QF	7–6^{(7–5)}, 5–7, 6–3	65	
2025
13.	Karen Khachanov	10	Almaty Open, Kazakhstan	Hard (i)	2R	4–6, 7–6^{(7–5)}, 6–3	98	
2026
14.	(Kazakhstan) Alexander Bublik	10	French Open, France	Clay	1R	7–5, 6–7^{(6–8)}, 6–4, 7–5	80	
15.	Daniil Medvedev	9	Wimbledon, United Kingdom	Grass	3R	7–6^{(7–4)}, 7–6^{(7–5)}, 7–5	74	
16.	(France) Arthur Fils	10	European Open, Belgium	Hard (i)	SF	6–4, 6–7^{(7–9)}, 7–6^{(7–5)}	58	

== National representation ==
=== Davis Cup: 33 (21–12) ===
Group membership Finals / World Group (11–9) Qualifying round / Play-offs (10–3)	Matches by type Singles (17–12) Doubles (4–0)	Matches by surface Hard (16–10) Clay (5–2)	Matches by venue Germany (10–1) Away (7–4) Neutral (4–7)

Date	Venue	Surface	Rd	Opponent nation	Score	Match	Opponent player(s)	W/L	Rubber score
2015
Mar 2015	Frankfurt	Hard (i)	1R	France	2–3	Singles 1	Gilles Simon	Loss	6–7^{(4–7)}, 6–2, 7–6^{(7–1)}, 2–6, 8–10
Mar 2015	Frankfurt	Hard (i)	1R	France	2–3	Singles 5 (dead)	Nicolas Mahut	Win	7–6^{(8–6)}, 6–3
2016
Sep 2016	Berlin	Clay	PO	Poland	3–2	Singles 1	Kamil Majchrzak	Win	6–7^{(8–10)}, 6–3, 5–7, 6–2, 6–1
Sep 2016	Berlin	Clay	PO	Poland	3–2	Singles 5 (decider)	Hubert Hurkacz	Win	7–6^{(7–4)}, 6–4, 6–1
2017
Sep 2017	Oeiras	Clay	PO	Portugal	3–2	Singles 2	Pedro Sousa	Loss	2–6, 5–7, 6–7^{(5–7)}
Sep 2017	Oeiras	Clay	PO	Portugal	3–2	Doubles (w/ T Pütz)	G Elias / J Sousa	Win	6–2, 4–6, 6–7^{(5–7)}, 6–4, 6–4
Sep 2017	Oeiras	Clay	PO	Portugal	3–2	Singles 4	João Sousa	Win	6–0, 6–7^{(3–7)}, 3–6, 7–6^{(8–6)}, 6–4
2018
Feb 2018	Brisbane	Hard	1R	Australia	3–1	Singles 2	Nick Kyrgios	Loss	4–6, 4–6, 4–6
Feb 2018	Brisbane	Hard	1R	Australia	3–1	Doubles (w/ T Pütz)	M Ebden / J Peers	Win	6–4, 6–7^{(5–7)}, 6–2, 6–7^{(4–7)}, 6–4
Apr 2018	Valencia	Clay	QF	Spain	2–3	Doubles (w/ T Pütz)	F López / M López	Win	6–3, 6–4, 3–6, 6–7^{(4–7)}, 7–5
2019
Feb 2019	Frankfurt	Hard (i)	QR	Hungary	5–0	Doubles (w/ T Pütz)	G Borsos / P Nagy	Win	6–2, 6–3
Nov 2019	Madrid	Hard (i)	RR	Argentina	3–0	Singles 2	Diego Schwartzman	Win	6–3, 7–6^{(10–8)}
Nov 2019	Madrid	Hard (i)	RR	Chile	2–1	Singles 2	Cristian Garín	Loss	7–6^{(7–3)}, 6–7^{(7–9)}, 6–7^{(8–10)}
Nov 2019	Madrid	Hard (i)	QF	Great Britain	0–2	Singles 2	Dan Evans	Loss	6–7^{(6–8)}, 6–3, 6–7^{(2–7)}
2020–21
Mar 2020	Düsseldorf	Hard (i)	QR	Belarus	4–1	Singles 1	Ilya Ivashka	Win	6–4, 6–4
Mar 2020	Düsseldorf	Hard (i)	QR	Belarus	4–1	Singles 4	Egor Gerasimov	Win	6–3, 6–2
Nov 2021	Innsbruck	Hard (i)	RR	Serbia	2–1	Singles 2	Novak Djokovic	Loss	2–6, 4–6
Nov 2021	Innsbruck	Hard (i)	RR	Austria	2–1	Singles 2	Dennis Novak	Win	7–5, 6–4
Nov 2021	Innsbruck	Hard (i)	QF	Great Britain	2–1	Singles 2	Cameron Norrie	Win	7–6^{(8–6)}, 3–6, 6–2
Dec 2021	Madrid	Hard (i)	SF	Russia	1–2	Singles 2	Daniil Medvedev	Loss	4–6, 4–6
2022
Mar 2022	Rio de Janeiro	Clay	QR	Brazil	3–1	Singles 2	Thiago Monteiro	Loss	3–6, 6–1, 3–6
Sep 2022	Hamburg	Hard (i)	RR	France	2–1	Singles 1	Benjamin Bonzi	Win	6–4, 2–6, 7–5
Sep 2022	Hamburg	Hard (i)	RR	Belgium	2–1	Singles 1	Zizou Bergs	Win	6–4, 7–6^{(11–9)}
Sep 2022	Hamburg	Hard (i)	RR	Australia	2–1	Singles 1	Max Purcell	Win	6–1, 7–5
Nov 2022	Málaga	Hard (i)	QF	Canada	1–2	Singles 1	Denis Shapovalov	Win	6–3, 4–6, 7–6^{(7–2)}
2024
Feb 2024	Tatabánya	Hard (i)	QR	Hungary	3–2	Singles 2	Márton Fucsovics	Loss	3–6, 5–7
Feb 2024	Tatabánya	Hard (i)	QR	Hungary	3–2	Singles 4	Máté Valkusz	Win	6–3, 6–2
Nov 2024	Málaga	Hard (i)	QF	Canada	2–0	Singles 2	Denis Shapovalov	Win	4–6, 7–5, 7–6^{(7–5)}
Nov 2024	Málaga	Hard (i)	SF	Netherlands	0–2	Singles 2	Tallon Griekspoor	Loss	7–6^{(7–4)}, 5–7, 4–6
2025
Sep 2025	Tokyo	Hard (i)	Q2	Japan	4–0	Singles 1	Yoshihito Nishioka	Win	6–4, 6–7^{(4–7)}, 6–4
Nov 2025	Bologna	Hard (i)	QF	Argentina	2–1	Singles 1	Tomás Martín Etcheverry	Loss	6–7^{(3–7)}, 6–7^{(7–9)}
Nov 2025	Bologna	Hard (i)	SF	Spain	1–2	Singles 1	Pablo Carreño Busta	Loss	4–6, 6–7^{(6–8)}
2026
Feb 2026	Düsseldorf	Hard (i)	Q1	Peru	4–0	Singles 2	Juan Pablo Varillas	Win	6–4, 6–2

=== ATP Cup: 12 (7–5) ===
Matches by type
Singles (5–4)
Doubles (2–1)

Venue	Surface	Rd	Opponent nation	Score	Match	Opponent player(s)	W/L	Match score
2020
Brisbane	Hard	RR	Australia	0–3	Singles	Nick Kyrgios	Loss	4–6, 6–7^{(4–7)}
Brisbane	Hard	RR	Greece	2–1	Singles	Michail Pervolarakis	Win	6–4, 6–1
Brisbane	Hard	RR	Canada	1–2	Singles	Félix Auger-Aliassime	Win	6–1, 6–4
2021
Melbourne	Hard	RR	Canada	2–1	Singles	Milos Raonic	Win	7–6^{(7–4)}, 7–6^{(7–2)}
Melbourne	Hard	RR	Canada	2–1	Doubles (w/ K Krawietz)	S Diez / P Polansky	Loss	6–7^{(4–7)}, 7–6^{(8–6)}, [3–10]
Melbourne	Hard	RR	Serbia	2–1	Singles	Dušan Lajović	Win	3–6, 6–3, 6–4
Melbourne	Hard	RR	Serbia	2–1	Doubles (w/ A Zverev)	N Ćaćić / N Djokovic	Win	7–6^{(7–4)}, 5–7, [10–7]
Melbourne	Hard	SF	Russia	1–2	Singles	Andrey Rublev	Loss	6–3, 1–6, 2–6
Melbourne	Hard	SF	Russia	1–2	Doubles (w/ K Krawietz)	E Donskoy / A Karatsev	Win	6–3, 7–6^{(7–2)}
2022
Sydney	Hard	RR	Great Britain	1–2	Singles	Dan Evans	Loss	1–6, 2–6
Sydney	Hard	RR	United States	2–1	Singles	John Isner	Win	7–6^{(9–7)}, 4–6, 7–5
Sydney	Hard	RR	Canada	1–2	Singles	Denis Shapovalov	Loss	6–7^{(5–7)}, 6–4, 3–6

Awards
Preceded by (Croatia) Borna Ćorić	ATP Comeback Player of the Year; 2023	Succeeded by (Italy) Matteo Berrettini
