= James Frawley (tennis) =

Australian tennis player

- Country (sports): Australia
- Residence: Canberra, Australia
- Born: 29 March 1994 (age 32) Canberra, Australia
- Height: 1.83 m (6 ft 0 in)
- Plays: Right-handed
- Prize money: $41,800

Singles
- Career record: 0–0 (at ATP Tour level, Grand Slam level, and in Davis Cup)
- Career titles: 0
- Highest ranking: No. 606 (27 May 2019)

Doubles
- Career record: 0–2 (at ATP Tour level, Grand Slam level, and in Davis Cup)
- Career titles: 0
- Highest ranking: No. 282 (6 March 2023)

James Frawley (born 29 March 1994) is an Australian tennis player.

Frawley has a career high ATP singles ranking of No. 606 achieved on 27 May 2019 and a career high ATP doubles ranking of No. 282 achieved on 6 March 2023.

Frawley made his ATP main draw debut at the 2015 Malaysian Open in the doubles draw partnering Nick Kyrgios.

== ITF Futures/World Tennis Tour Finals ==
=== Doubles: 15 (10–5) ===
Titles by surface
Hard (4–2)
Clay (6–3)
Grass (0–0)
Carpet (0–0)

Result	W–L	Date	Tournament	Tier	Surface	Partner	Opponents	Score
Loss	0–1	Sep 2016	Australia F6, Brisbane	Futures	Hard	(Australia) Harry Bourchier	(Australia) Dayne Kelly (Australia) Bradley Mousley	2–6, 3–6
Loss	0–2	Apr 2017	Turkey F16, Antalya	Futures	Clay	(Australia) Joel Cannell	(Uruguay) Martín Cuevas (Peru) Juan Pablo Varillas	2–6, 4–6
Win	1–2	May 2018	Singapore F3, Singapore	Futures	Hard	(Australia) Jeremy Beale	(Chinese Taipei) Hsu Yu-hsiou (Japan) Yuta Shimizu	6–2, 6–3
Win	2–2	Jul 2019	M15 Saarlouis, Germany	World Tennis Tour	Clay	(Germany) Mats Rosenkranz	(Luxembourg) Tom Diederich (Germany) Lasse Muscheites	6–4, 6–2
Loss	2–3	Jul 2019	M15 Marburg, Germany	World Tennis Tour	Clay	(Germany) Mats Rosenkranz	(Romania) Vasile Antonescu (Romania) Patrick Grigoriu	6–7^{(6–8)}, 6–4, [6–10]
Win	3–3	Jul 2019	M25 Kassel, Germany	World Tennis Tour	Clay	(Germany) Mats Rosenkranz	(France) Sadio Doumbia (France) Fabien Reboul	7–5, 7–6^{(12–10)}
Win	4–3	Aug 2019	M15 Wetzlar, Germany	World Tennis Tour	Clay	(Germany) Mats Rosenkranz	(Germany) Constantin Schmitz (Germany) Niklas Schell	2–6, 6–3, [12–10]
Win	5–3	Jun 2022	M15 Martos, Spain	World Tennis Tour	Clay	(Australia) Akira Santillan	(Spain) Adrià Soriano Barrera (Spain) Benjamín Winter López	6–7^{(7–9)}, 6–3, [10–6]
Loss	5–4	Jul 2022	M25 Den Haag, Netherlands	World Tennis Tour	Clay	(Australia) Akira Santillan	(Brazil) Orlando Luz (Brazil) Marcelo Zormann	6–7^{(5–7)}, 6–2, [9–11]
Win	6–4	Aug 2022	M15 Trier, Germany	World Tennis Tour	Clay	(Germany) Christoph Negritu	(Germany) Tom Gentzsch (Germany) Adrian Oetzbach	6–3, 6–4
Win	7–4	Sep 2022	M15 Allershausen, Germany	World Tennis Tour	Clay	(Germany) Christoph Negritu	(Latvia) Miķelis Lībietis (Germany) Timo Stodder	6–4, 2–6, [10–5]
Win	8–4	Oct 2022	M15 Monastir, Tunisia	World Tennis Tour	Hard	(Germany) Christoph Negritu	(United States) Bruno Kuzuhara (China) Sun Fajing	6–4, 1–6, [10–6]
Loss	8–5	Oct 2022	M25 Monastir, Tunisia	World Tennis Tour	Hard	(Germany) Christoph Negritu	(India) Rithvik Choudary Bollipalli (India) Niki Kaliyanda Poonacha	3–6, 6–2, [6–10]
Win	9–5	Nov 2022	M25 Traralgon, Australia	World Tennis Tour	Hard	(Australia) Jeremy Beale	(Australia) Adam Taylor (United Kingdom) Mark Whitehouse	6–3, 6–4
Win	10–5	Nov 2022	M25 Traralgon, Australia	World Tennis Tour	Hard	(Australia) Jeremy Beale	(Australia) Matthew Romios (Australia) Calum Puttergill	6–3, 6–2
