= Canberra Challenger =

Tennis tournament held in Australia

Defunct tennis tournament
- Event name: Apis Canberra International (2020), East Hotel Canberra Challenger (2019)
- Location: Bendigo (2020), Canberra, Australia
- Venue: Canberra Tennis Centre
- Category: ATP Challenger Tour
- Surface: Hard / Outdoors
- Draw: 32S/32Q/16D
- Prize money: $130,000
- Website: Website

The Apis Canberra International was a tennis tournament held in Canberra, Australia since 2016 until 2020 when it was relocated to Bendigo. The event was part of the ATP Challenger Tour and was played on outdoor hardcourts.

In January 2019, Tennis ACT announced that the Canberra Challenger would continue despite the introduction of the ATP Cup the following summer.

== Past finals ==
=== Singles ===
Year	Champion	Runner-up	Score
2016	(Italy) Paolo Lorenzi	(Croatia) Ivan Dodig	6–2, 6–4
2017	(Israel) Dudi Sela	(Germany) Jan-Lennard Struff	3–6, 6–4, 6–3
2018	(Italy) Andreas Seppi	(Hungary) Márton Fucsovics	5–7, 6–4, 6–3
2019	(Poland) Hubert Hurkacz	(Belarus) Ilya Ivashka	6–4, 4–6, 6–2
2020	(Germany) Philipp Kohlschreiber	(Finland) Emil Ruusuvuori	7–6^{(7–5)}, 4–6, 6–3

=== Doubles ===
Year	Champions	Runners-up	Score
2016	(Poland) Mariusz Fyrstenberg (Mexico) Santiago González	(Australia) Maverick Banes (Australia) Jarryd Chaplin	7–6^{(7–3)}, 6–3
2017	(Germany) Andre Begemann (Germany) Jan-Lennard Struff	(Argentina) Carlos Berlocq (Argentina) Andrés Molteni	6–3, 6–4
2018	(Israel) Jonathan Erlich (India) Divij Sharan	(Chile) Hans Podlipnik-Castillo (Belarus) Andrei Vasilevski	7–6^{(7–1)}, 6–2
2019	(Brazil) Marcelo Demoliner (France) Hugo Nys	(Sweden) André Göransson (Netherlands) Sem Verbeek	3–6, 6–4, [10–3]
2020	(Australia) Max Purcell (Australia) Luke Saville	(Israel) Jonathan Erlich (Belarus) Andrei Vasilevski	7–6^{(7–3)}, 7–6^{(7–3)}
