= 2024 Hangzhou Open =

- Date: 18–24 September
- Edition: 1st
- Category: ATP Tour 250 series
- Draw: 28S / 16D
- Prize money: $1,081,395
- Surface: Hard / outdoor
- Location: Hangzhou, China
- Venue: Hangzhou Olympic Sports Expo Center

Champions

Singles
- (Croatia) Marin Čilić

Doubles
- (India) Jeevan Nedunchezhiyan / (India) Vijay Sundar Prashanth
Hangzhou Open	· 2025 →

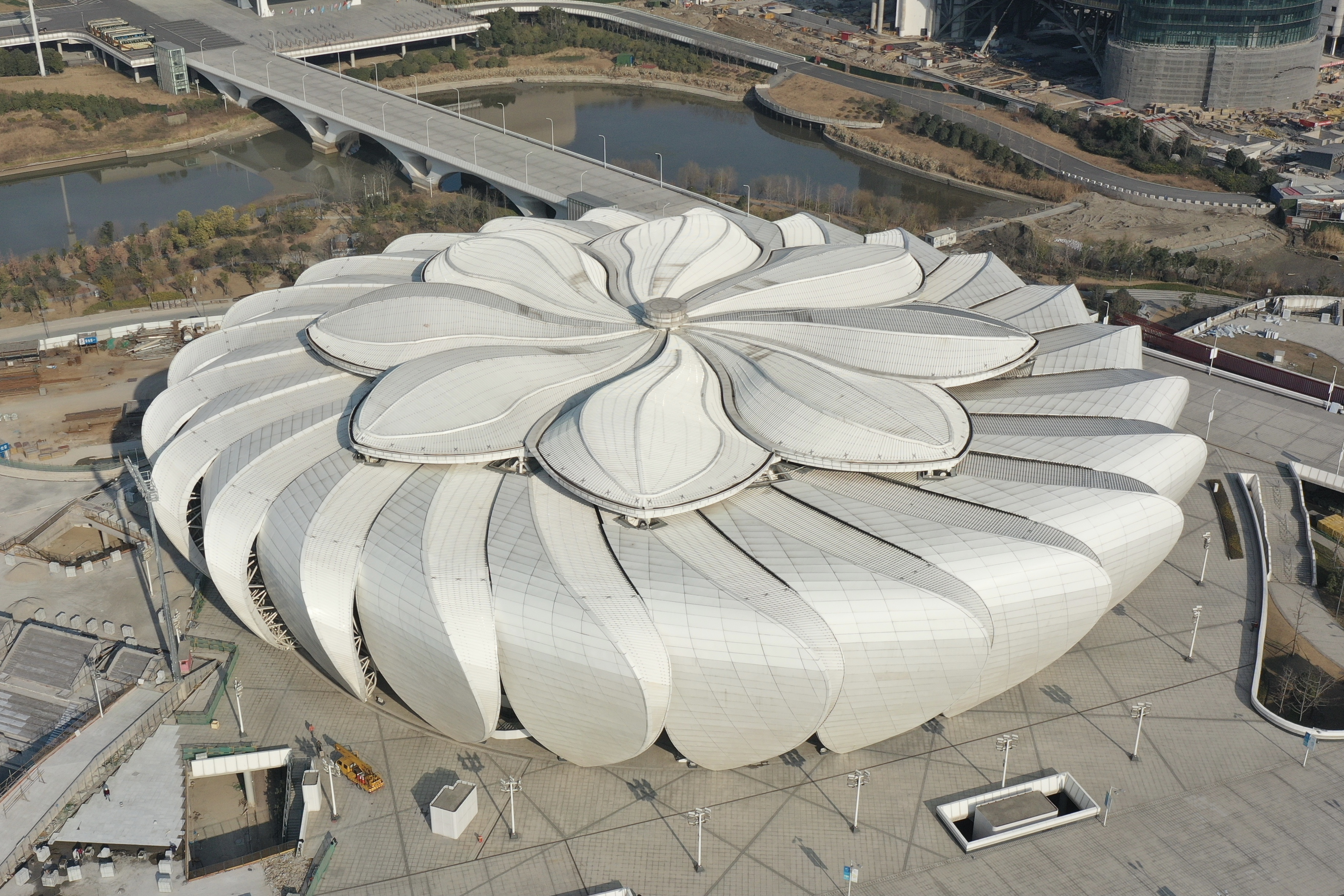
retractable roof at Tennis Center in Hangzhou

The 2024 Hangzhou Open was a men's tennis tournament played on outdoor hardcourts. It was the first edition of the Hangzhou Open and part of the ATP Tour 250 series of the 2024 ATP Tour. It took place at the Hangzhou Olympic Sports Expo Center in Hangzhou, China, from 18 September until 24 September 2024. Unseeded Marin Čilić, who entered the main draw on a wildcard, won the singles title. The tournament replaced the Zhuhai Championships on the ATP Tour calendar.

== Finals ==
=== Singles ===
- (Croatia) Marin Čilić defeated (China) Zhang Zhizhen 7–6^{(7–5)}, 7–6^{(7–5)}

=== Doubles ===
- (India) Jeevan Nedunchezhiyan / (India) Vijay Sundar Prashanth defeated (Germany) Constantin Frantzen / (Germany) Hendrik Jebens 4–6, 7–6^{(7–5)}, [10–7]

== Singles main-draw entrants ==
=== Seeds ===
Country	Player	Rank^{1}	Seed
DEN	Holger Rune	14	1
	Karen Khachanov	23	2
~~ARG~~	~~Tomás Martín Etcheverry~~	~~34~~	~~3~~
USA	Brandon Nakashima	39	4
ITA	Luciano Darderi	41	5
CHN	Zhang Zhizhen	48	6
HUN	Fábián Marozsán	49	7
JPN	Yoshihito Nishioka	54	8

- ^{1} Rankings are as of 16 September 2024

=== Other entrants ===
The following players received wildcards into the singles main draw:

- (China) Bu Yunchaokete
- (Croatia) Marin Čilić
- (China) Wu Yibing

The following players received entry from the qualifying draw:

- (Argentina) Marco Trungelliti
- (Japan) Yasutaka Uchiyama
- (Hong Kong) Coleman Wong
- (Kazakhstan) Denis Yevseyev

The following player received entry as lucky losers:

- (United States) Mitchell Krueger
- (Australia) James McCabe

=== Withdrawals ===
- (Italy) Matteo Berrettini → replaced by (Italy) Mattia Bellucci
- (Argentina) Tomás Martín Etcheverry → replaced by (United States) Mitchell Krueger
- (Germany) Dominik Koepfer → replaced by (Italy) Luca Nardi
- (United States) Sebastian Korda → replaced by (Germany) Maximilian Marterer
- (Serbia) Dušan Lajović → replaced by (Kazakhstan) Mikhail Kukushkin
- (United States) Alex Michelsen → replaced by (Bosnia and Herzegovina) Damir Džumhur
- (India) Sumit Nagal → replaced by (Australia) James McCabe
- Andrey Rublev → replaced by (United States) Zachary Svajda

== Doubles main-draw entrants ==
=== Seeds ===
Country	Player	Country	Player	Rank^{1}	Seed
USA	Nathaniel Lammons	USA	Jackson Withrow	40	1
GBR	Julian Cash	GBR	Lloyd Glasspool	80	2
URU	Ariel Behar	USA	Robert Galloway	85	3
GBR	Jamie Murray	AUS	John Peers	91	4

- ^{1} Rankings are as of 16 September 2024

=== Other entrants ===
The following pairs received wildcards into the doubles main draw:

- (China) Bu Yunchaokete / (China) Te Rigele
- (China) Jin Yuquan / (China) Li Zekai

The following pairs received entry as alternates:

- (Australia) Rinky Hijikata / (United States) Mackenzie McDonald
- (New Zealand) Rubin Statham / (United States) Zachary Svajda

=== Withdrawals ===
- (Italy) Luciano Darderi / (Argentina) Tomás Martín Etcheverry → replaced by (Australia) Rinky Hijikata / (United States) Mackenzie McDonald
- (Bosnia and Herzegovina) Damir Džumhur / (Serbia) Dušan Lajović → replaced by (New Zealand) Rubin Statham / (United States) Zachary Svajda
- (Belgium) Sander Gillé / (Belgium) Joran Vliegen → replaced by (Australia) Blake Bayldon / (Australia) Thomas Fancutt
