= 2025 Hangzhou Open – Doubles =

Doubles
- 2025 Hangzhou Open

Final
- Champions: (Portugal) Francisco Cabral (Austria) Lucas Miedler
- Runners-up: (Colombia) Nicolás Barrientos (Netherlands) David Pel
- Score: 6–4, 6–4

Details
- Draw: 28 (2WC)
- Seeds: 8

Events
Singles	Doubles
← 2024 ·	Hangzhou Open	· 2026 →

Francisco Cabral and Lucas Miedler defeated Nicolás Barrientos and David Pel in the final, 6–4, 6–4 to win the doubles tennis title at the 2025 Hangzhou Open.

Jeevan Nedunchezhiyan and Vijay Sundar Prashanth were the reigning champions, but Nedunchezhiyan did not participate this year. Prashanth partnered Arjun Kadhe, but lost in the quarterfinals to Guido Andreozzi and Manuel Guinard.

== Seeds ==
1. (Portugal) Francisco Cabral / (Austria) Lucas Miedler (champions)
2. (United States) Robert Cash / (United States) JJ Tracy (quarterfinals)
3. (Brazil) Fernando Romboli / (Australia) John-Patrick Smith (quarterfinals)
4. (Argentina) Guido Andreozzi / (France) Manuel Guinard (semifinals)

== Draw ==
=== Key ===
- Q = Qualifier
- WC = Wild card
- LL = Lucky loser
- Alt = Alternate
- ITF = ITF entry
- PR = Protected ranking
- SR = Special ranking
- SE = Special exempt
- JE = Junior exempt
- JR = Junior Accelerator Programme entrant
- CO = College Accelerator Programme entrant
- NG = Next Gen Accelerator Program entrant
- w/o = Walkover
- r = Retired
- d = Defaulted

=== Draw ===
First round
1	(Portugal) F Cabral (Austria) L Miedler	6	6
(Uruguay) A Behar (Belgium) J Vliegen	3	2
(Monaco) R Arneodo (Belgium) S Gillé	6	4	[10]
(India) A Chandrasekar (United States) R Stalder	2	6	[7]
3	(Brazil) F Romboli (Australia) J-P Smith	3	6	[10]
(Australia) R Hijikata (Australia) A Walton	6	3	[8]
(India) S Balaji (India) RC Bollipalli	6	7
(France) T Arribagé (Chinese Taipei) R Ho	4	5
PR	(India) A Kadhe (India) VS Prashanth	6	6
WC	(United States) L Tien (China) Y Wu	2	4
WC	(China) Y Bu (United States) S Korda	1	4
4	(Argentina) G Andreozzi (France) M Guinard	6	6
(Colombia) N Barrientos (Netherlands) D Pel	6^{4}	7^{7}	[10]
(Czech Republic) P Nouza (Czech Republic) P Rikl	7^{7}	6^{4}	[8]
(Argentina) TM Etcheverry (Argentina) C Ugo Carabelli	3	4
2	(United States) R Cash (United States) JJ Tracy	6	6

Quarterfinals
1	(Portugal) F Cabral (Austria) L Miedler	4	6	[10]
(Monaco) R Arneodo (Belgium) S Gillé	6	3	[6]
3	(Brazil) F Romboli (Australia) J-P Smith	7^{7}	2	[5]
(India) S Balaji (India) RC Bollipalli	6^{5}	6	[10]
PR	(India) A Kadhe (India) VS Prashanth	4	2
4	(Argentina) G Andreozzi (France) M Guinard	6	6
(Colombia) N Barrientos (Netherlands) D Pel	6	7^{7}
2	(United States) R Cash (United States) JJ Tracy	1	6^{3}

Semifinals
1	(Portugal) F Cabral (Austria) L Miedler	3	6	[10]
(India) S Balaji (India) RC Bollipalli	6	3	[3]
4	(Argentina) G Andreozzi (France) M Guinard	1	6	[8]
(Colombia) N Barrientos (Netherlands) D Pel	6	3	[10]

Final
1	(Portugal) F Cabral (Austria) L Miedler	6	6
(Colombia) N Barrientos (Netherlands) D Pel	4	4
