= 2023 Heilbronner Neckarcup =

- Date: 5–11 June
- Edition: 9th
- Surface: Clay
- Location: Heilbronn, Germany

Champions

Singles
- (Italy) Matteo Arnaldi

Doubles
- (Germany) Constantin Frantzen / (Germany) Hendrik Jebens
- Heilbronner Neckarcup

The 2023 Heilbronner Neckarcup was a professional tennis tournament played on clay courts. It was the ninth edition of the tournament which was part of the 2023 Challenger Tour 125. It took place in Heilbronn, Germany between 5 and 11 June 2023.

== Champions ==
=== Singles ===
- (Italy) Matteo Arnaldi def. (Argentina) Facundo Díaz Acosta 7–6^{(7–4)}, 6–1.

=== Doubles ===
- (Germany) Constantin Frantzen / (Germany) Hendrik Jebens def. (Romania) Victor Vlad Cornea / (Austria) Philipp Oswald 7–6^{(9–7)}, 6–4.

== Singles main-draw entrants ==
=== Seeds ===
| Country | Player | Rank^{1} | Seed |
|---|---|---|---|
| ITA | Marco Cecchinato | 72 | 1 |
| ESP | Jaume Munar | 81 | 2 |
| COL | Daniel Elahi Galán | 91 | 3 |
| AUT | Dominic Thiem | 92 | 4 |
| ITA | Matteo Arnaldi | 106 | 5 |
| HUN | Fábián Marozsán | 115 | 6 |
| GER | Oscar Otte | 120 | 7 |
| | Pavel Kotov | 121 | 8 |

- ^{1} Rankings are as of 29 May 2023.

=== Other entrants ===
The following players received wildcards into the singles main draw:

- (Germany) Rudolf Molleker
- (Austria) Dominic Thiem
- (Germany) Marko Topo

The following players received entry into the singles main draw as alternates:

- (France) Dan Added
- (Argentina) Hernán Casanova
- (Turkey) Cem İlkel

The following players received entry from the qualifying draw:

- (Germany) Sebastian Fanselow
- (Germany) Lucas Gerch
- (Switzerland) Jérôme Kym
- (Germany) Max Hans Rehberg
- (Australia) Akira Santillan
- (Germany) Henri Squire

The following player received entry as a lucky loser:

- (France) Maxime Janvier
