= 2025 Hangzhou Open – Singles =

Singles
- 2025 Hangzhou Open

Final
- Champion: (Kazakhstan) Alexander Bublik
- Runner-up: (France) Valentin Royer
- Score: 7–6^{(7–4)}, 7–6^{(7–4)}

Details
- Draw: 28 (4 Q / 3 WC )
- Seeds: 8

Events
| Singles | Doubles |
| ← 2024 · | Hangzhou Open | · 2026 → |

Alexander Bublik defeated Valentin Royer in the final, 7–6^{(7–4)}, 7–6^{(7–4)} to win the singles tennis title at the 2025 Hangzhou Open. It was his eighth ATP Tour title. Bublik was the second player in the 2025 season to win a title without dropping serve during the tournament, after Taylor Fritz at the Stuttgart Open.

Marin Čilić was the defending champion, but lost in the first round to Nishesh Basavareddy.

== Seeds ==
The top four seeds received a bye into the second round.

1. Andrey Rublev (second round)
2. Daniil Medvedev (quarterfinals)
3. (Kazakhstan) Alexander Bublik (champion)
4. (France) Corentin Moutet (semifinals)
5. (Argentina) Camilo Ugo Carabelli (first round)
6. (France) Adrian Mannarino (first round)
7. (United States) Learner Tien (quarterfinals)
8. (Italy) Matteo Berrettini (first round)

== Draw ==
=== Key ===
- Q = Qualifier
- WC = Wild card
- LL = Lucky loser
- Alt = Alternate
- ITF = ITF entry
- PR = Protected ranking
- SR = Special ranking
- SE = Special exempt
- JE = Junior exempt
- JR = Junior Accelerator Programme entrant
- CO = College Accelerator Programme entrant
- NG = Next Gen Accelerator Program entrant
- w/o = Walkover
- r = Retired
- d = Defaulted

=== Finals ===
Semifinals
Q | (France) Valentin Royer | 6 | 6
4 | (France) Corentin Moutet | 3 | 2
3 | (Kazakhstan) Alexander Bublik | 6 | 6
WC | (China) Wu Yibing | 3 | 3

Final
Q | (France) Valentin Royer | 6^{4} | 6^{4}
3 | (Kazakhstan) Alexander Bublik | 7^{7} | 7^{7}

=== Top half ===
First round
(United States) A Kovacevic | 6 | 6^{6} | 3
Q | (France) V Royer | 4 | 7^{8} | 6
Q | (Italy) G Zeppieri | 6 | 6
WC | (China) F Sun | 3 | 2
(Argentina) M Navone | 7 | 3 | 4
7 | (United States) L Tien | 5 | 6 | 6
(France) A Cazaux | 6 | 3 | 7
(Italy) M Arnaldi | 4 | 6 | 5
(Bosnia and Herzegovina) D Džumhur | 2 | 4
(Argentina) TM Etcheverry | 6 | 6
Q | (Australia) R Hijikata | 7^{7} | 6
5 | (Argentina) C Ugo Carabelli | 6^{2} | 4

Second round
1 | A Rublev | 4 | 6^{2}
Q | (France) V Royer | 6 | 7^{7}
Q | (Italy) G Zeppieri | 4 | 3
7 | (United States) L Tien | 6 | 6
4 | (France) C Moutet | 6^{1} | 6 | 7^{7}
(France) A Cazaux | 7^{7} | 3 | 6^{3}
(Argentina) TM Etcheverry | 6 | 6
Q | (Australia) R Hijikata | 1 | 4

Quarterfinals
Q | (France) V Royer | 7^{7} | 4 | 6
7 | (United States) L Tien | 6^{0} | 6 | 2
4 | (France) C Moutet | 3 | 3
(Argentina) TM Etcheverry | 6 | 0^{r}

Semifinals
Q | (France) V Royer | 6 | 6
4 | (France) C Moutet | 3 | 2

=== Bottom half ===
First round
8 | (Italy) M Berrettini | 3 | 3
LL | (Czech Republic) D Svrčina | 6 | 6
(China) Y Bu | 7^{7} | 4 | 6^{3}
WC | (China) Z Zhang | 6^{2} | 6 | 7^{7}
(Australia) A Vukic | 6 | 1 | 6
(Belgium) D Goffin | 4 | 6 | 1
6 | (France) A Mannarino | 6 | 6^{5} | 5
WC | (China) Y Wu | 4 | 7^{7} | 7
(Australia) A Walton | 5 | 3
(United States) S Korda | 7 | 6
Q | (United States) N Basavareddy | 4 | 6 | 6
(Croatia) M Čilić | 6 | 4 | 3

Second round
LL | (Czech Republic) D Svrčina | 6 | 6
WC | (China) Z Zhang | 4 | 3
(Australia) A Vukic | 7^{8} | 4 | 4
3 | (Kazakhstan) A Bublik | 6^{6} | 6 | 6
WC | (China) Y Wu | 4 | 6 | 6
(United States) S Korda | 6 | 1 | 4
Q | (United States) N Basavareddy | 2 | 3
2 | D Medvedev | 6 | 6

Quarterfinals
LL | (Czech Republic) D Svrčina | 1 | 1
3 | (Kazakhstan) A Bublik | 6 | 6
WC | (China) Y Wu | 5 | 7^{7} | 6
2 | D Medvedev | 7 | 6^{5} | 4

Semifinals
3 | (Kazakhstan) A Bublik | 6 | 6
WC | (China) Y Wu | 3 | 3

== Qualifying ==
=== Seeds ===
1. (France) Valentin Royer (qualified)
2. (Czech Republic) Dalibor Svrčina (qualifying competition, lucky loser)
3. (United States) Nishesh Basavareddy (qualified)
4. (Australia) Rinky Hijikata (qualified)
5. (United States) Brandon Holt (qualifying competition)
6. (United States) Tristan Boyer (first round)
7. (Canada) Liam Draxl (first round)
8. (Chinese Taipei) Tseng Chun-hsin (first round)

=== Qualifiers ===
1. (France) Valentin Royer
2. (Italy) Giulio Zeppieri
3. (United States) Nishesh Basavareddy
4. (Australia) Rinky Hijikata

=== Lucky loser ===
1. (Czech Republic) Dalibor Svrčina

=== Qualifying draw ===
==== First qualifier ====
First round
1 | (France) Valentin Royer | 6 | 7
WC | (China) Charles Chen | 3 | 5
(United States) Eliot Spizzirri | 2 | 6 | 6
8 | (Chinese Taipei) Tseng Chun-hsin | 6 | 1 | 4

Qualifying competition
1 | (France) Valentin Royer | 7 | 4 | 6
(United States) Eliot Spizzirri | 5 | 6 | 3

==== Second qualifier ====
First round
2 | (Czech Republic) Dalibor Svrčina | 0 | 6 | 2
(Kazakhstan) Timofey Skatov | 6 | 4 | 0^{r}
PR | (Italy) Giulio Zeppieri | 6^{5} | 6 | 6
7 | (Canada) Liam Draxl | 7^{7} | 1 | 3

Qualifying competition
2 | (Czech Republic) Dalibor Svrčina | 1 | 4
PR | (Italy) Giulio Zeppieri | 6 | 6

==== Third qualifier ====
First round
3 | (United States) Nishesh Basavareddy | 6 | 7^{7}
(Kazakhstan) Beibit Zhukayev | 2 | 6^{3}
Alt | (Belgium) Gauthier Onclin | 6 | 7^{8}
6 | (United States) Tristan Boyer | 4 | 6^{6}

Qualifying competition
3 | (United States) Nishesh Basavareddy | 6 | 6
Alt | (Belgium) Gauthier Onclin | 1 | 3

==== Fourth qualifier ====
First round
4 | (Australia) Rinky Hijikata | 4 | 7^{7} | 6
(United States) Christopher Eubanks | 6 | 6^{5} | 4
WC | (China) Chen Ye | 5 | 2
5 | (United States) Brandon Holt | 7 | 6

Qualifying competition
4 | (Australia) Rinky Hijikata | 6 | 7
5 | (United States) Brandon Holt | 2 | 5
