= 2023 Moselle Open =

- Date: 5–11 November
- Edition: 20th
- Category: ATP Tour 250 series
- Surface: Hard (indoor)
- Location: Metz, France
- Venue: Arènes de Metz

Champions

Singles
- (France) Ugo Humbert

Doubles
- (Monaco) Hugo Nys / (Poland) Jan Zieliński
- Moselle Open

The 2023 Moselle Open was a men's tennis tournament to be played on indoor hard courts. It was the 20th edition of the event, and it is part of the ATP 250 tournaments on the 2023 ATP Tour. It took place at the Arènes de Metz from 5 November to 11 November 2023.

== Champions ==
=== Singles ===
- (France) Ugo Humbert def. Alexander Shevchenko, 6–3, 6–3

=== Doubles ===
- (Monaco) Hugo Nys / (Poland) Jan Zieliński def. (Germany) Hendrik Jebens / (Germany) Constantin Frantzen, 6–4, 6–4

== Singles main-draw entrants ==
=== Seeds ===
Country	Player	Rank^{1}	Seed
~~DEN~~	~~Holger Rune~~	~~7~~	~~1~~
~~AUS~~	~~Alex de Minaur~~	~~13~~	~~2~~
	Karen Khachanov	15	3
FRA	Ugo Humbert	26	4
KAZ	Alexander Bublik	33	5
ITA	Lorenzo Sonego	46	6
GER	Yannick Hanfmann	47	7
SUI	Stan Wawrinka	51	8
GER	Daniel Altmaier	54	9

- ^{1} Rankings are as of 30 October 2023

=== Other entrants ===
The following players received wildcards into the singles main draw:

- (France) Arthur Cazaux
- (Italy) Fabio Fognini
- (France) Pierre-Hugues Herbert

The following players received entry from the qualifying draw:

- (France) Mathias Bourgue
- (France) Calvin Hemery
- (France) Harold Mayot
- (Jordan) Abdullah Shelbayh

The following players received entry as lucky losers:

- (Netherlands) Gijs Brouwer
- (France) Matteo Martineau
- (Hungary) Máté Valkusz

=== Withdrawals ===
- (Canada) Félix Auger-Aliassime → replaced by (Netherlands) Botic van de Zandschulp
- (Australia) Alex de Minaur → replaced by (Netherlands) Gijs Brouwer
- (France) Arthur Fils → replaced by (France) Matteo Martineau
- (Poland) Hubert Hurkacz → replaced by (France) Constant Lestienne
- Aslan Karatsev → replaced by (Italy) Lorenzo Sonego
- (Czech Republic) Jiří Lehečka → replaced by (Japan) Yosuke Watanuki
- (United Kingdom) Andy Murray → replaced by (France) Hugo Gaston
- (Japan) Yoshihito Nishioka → replaced by (Austria) Dominic Thiem
- (United Kingdom) Cameron Norrie → replaced by (Germany) Yannick Hanfmann
- (United States) Tommy Paul → replaced by (Spain) Bernabé Zapata Miralles
- (Denmark) Holger Rune → replaced by (Hungary) Máté Valkusz
- (Norway) Casper Ruud → replaced by Alexander Shevchenko
- Roman Safiullin → replaced by (Brazil) Thiago Seyboth Wild
- (United States) J. J. Wolf → replaced by (France) Luca Van Assche

== Doubles main-draw entrants ==
=== Seeds ===
Country	Player	Country	Player	Rank^{1}	Seed
MON	Hugo Nys	POL	Jan Zieliński	41	1
FIN	Harri Heliövaara	GER	Andreas Mies	62	2
GBR	Lloyd Glasspool	AUS	John Peers	70	3
FRA	Sadio Doumbia	FRA	Fabien Reboul	72	4

- Rankings are as of 30 October 2023

=== Other entrants ===
The following pairs received wildcards into the doubles main draw:

- (France) Ugo Blanchet / (France) Matteo Martineau
- (Italy) Fabio Fognini / (France) Pierre-Hugues Herbert

=== Withdrawals ===
- (El Salvador) Marcelo Arévalo / (Netherlands) Jean-Julien Rojer → replaced by (France) Dan Added / (France) Jonathan Eysseric
- (Mexico) Santiago González / (France) Édouard Roger-Vasselin → replaced by (Germany) Constantin Frantzen / (Germany) Hendrik Jebens
- (France) Pierre-Hugues Herbert / (France) Nicolas Mahut → replaced by (Netherlands) Sander Arends / (Mexico) Miguel Ángel Reyes-Varela
- (Germany) Kevin Krawietz / (Germany) Tim Pütz → replaced by (France) Théo Arribagé / (France) Luca Sanchez
- (United Kingdom) Jamie Murray / (New Zealand) Michael Venus → replaced by (India) Anirudh Chandrasekar / (Netherlands) Bart Stevens
