= 2024 Hangzhou Open – Singles =

Singles
- 2024 Hangzhou Open

Final
- Champion: (Croatia) Marin Čilić
- Runner-up: (China) Zhang Zhizhen
- Score: 7–6^{(7–5)}, 7–6^{(7–5)}

Details
- Draw: 28 (4 Q / 3 WC )
- Seeds: 8

Events
Singles	Doubles
Hangzhou Open	· 2025 →

Marin Čilić defeated Zhang Zhizhen in the final, 7–6^{(7–5)}, 7–6^{(7–5)} to win the inaugural singles tennis title at the 2024 Hangzhou Open. He saved two match points (in the quarterfinals against Yasutaka Uchiyama) en route to his 21st career ATP Tour singles title, and his first since the 2021 St. Petersburg Open.

Ranked as the world No. 777, Čilić became the lowest-ranked player to win an ATP Tour singles title, and the second-lowest ranked player to reach an ATP Tour final since the introduction of the ATP rankings in 1973, after Raemon Sluiter (ranked No. 866) at the 2009 Rosmalen Open.

== Seeds ==
The top four seeds received a bye into the second round.

1. (Denmark) Holger Rune (second round)
2. Karen Khachanov (second round)
3. (Argentina) Tomás Martín Etcheverry (withdrew)
4. (United States) Brandon Nakashima (semifinals)
5. (Italy) Luciano Darderi (first round)
6. (China) Zhang Zhizhen (final)
7. (Hungary) Fábián Marozsán (second round, withdrew)
8. (Japan) Yoshihito Nishioka (second round)

== Draw ==
=== Key ===
- Q = Qualifier
- WC = Wild card
- LL = Lucky loser
- Alt = Alternate
- ITF = ITF entry
- PR = Protected ranking
- SR = Special ranking
- SE = Special exempt
- JE = Junior exempt
- JR = Junior Accelerator Programme entrant
- CO = College Accelerator Programme entrant
- NG = Next Gen Accelerator Program entrant
- w/o = Walkover
- r = Retired
- d = Defaulted

=== Finals ===
Semifinals
WC	(Croatia) Marin Čilić	6	7^{8}
4	(United States) Brandon Nakashima	4	6^{6}
6	(China) Zhang Zhizhen	7^{7}	6
WC	(China) Bu Yunchaokete	6^{3}	4

Final
WC	(Croatia) Marin Čilić	7^{7}	7^{7}
6	(China) Zhang Zhizhen	6^{5}	6^{5}

=== Top half ===
First round
LL	(Australia) J McCabe	4	4
Q	(Japan) Y Uchiyama	6	6
WC	(Croatia) M Čilić	5	6	6
(United States) Z Svajda	7	3	0
(Germany) M Marterer	4	2
8	(Japan) Y Nishioka	6	6
WC	(China) Y Wu	3	0^{r}
Q	(Hong Kong) C Wong	6	0
(Australia) R Hijikata	2	7^{8}	6
(Bosnia and Herzegovina) D Džumhur	6	6^{6}	2
(Italy) L Nardi	0	2
7	(Hungary) F Marozsán	6	6

Second round
1	(Denmark) H Rune	5	4
Q	(Japan) Y Uchiyama	7	6
WC	(Croatia) M Čilić	6	6
8	(Japan) Y Nishioka	4	1
4	(United States) B Nakashima	6^{7}	7^{7}	6
Q	(Hong Kong) C Wong	7^{9}	6^{4}	1
(Australia) R Hijikata	w/o
7	(Hungary) F Marozsán

Quarterfinals
Q	(Japan) Y Uchiyama	2	7^{7}	6^{5}
WC	(Croatia) M Čilić	6	6^{4}	7^{7}
4	(United States) B Nakashima	7	6
(Australia) R Hijikata	5	3

Semifinals
WC	(Croatia) M Čilić	6	7^{8}
4	(United States) B Nakashima	4	6^{6}

=== Bottom half ===
First round
6	(China) Z Zhang	6	1	6
Q	(Kazakhstan) D Yevseyev	2	6	4
A Karatsev	4	0
(Italy) M Bellucci	6	6
(France) C Moutet	6^{6}	1
(Spain) R Carballés Baena	7^{8}	6
5	(Italy) L Darderi	3	4
(Kazakhstan) M Kukushkin	6	6
(Kazakhstan) A Shevchenko	6	6
Q	(Argentina) M Trungelliti	1	1
WC	(China) Y Bu	7	6
(France) H Gaston	5	3

Second round
6	(China) Z Zhang	6	6
(Italy) M Bellucci	3	0
(Spain) R Carballés Baena	3	6	6
LL	(United States) M Krueger	6	3	4
(Kazakhstan) M Kukushkin	6	7^{7}
(Kazakhstan) A Shevchenko	4	6^{3}
WC	(China) Y Bu	7^{9}	4	6
2	K Khachanov	6^{7}	6	3

Quarterfinals
6	(China) Z Zhang	6	6
(Spain) R Carballés Baena	3	3
(Kazakhstan) M Kukushkin	4	2
WC	(China) Y Bu	6	6

Semifinals
6	(China) Z Zhang	7^{7}	6
WC	(China) Y Bu	6^{3}	4

== Qualifying ==
=== Seeds ===
1. (Moldova) Radu Albot (first round)
2. (Argentina) Marco Trungelliti (qualified)
3. (United States) Mitchell Krueger (qualifying competition, lucky loser)
4. (Hong Kong) Coleman Wong (qualified)
5. (United States) Mackenzie McDonald (first round)
6. (Japan) Yasutaka Uchiyama (qualified)
7. (United States) Emilio Nava (first round)
8. (Kazakhstan) Denis Yevseyev (qualified)

=== Qualifiers ===
1. (Kazakhstan) Denis Yevseyev
2. (Argentina) Marco Trungelliti
3. (Japan) Yasutaka Uchiyama
4. (Hong Kong) Coleman Wong

=== Lucky losers ===
1. (United States) Mitchell Krueger
2. (Australia) James McCabe

=== Qualifying draw ===
==== First qualifier ====
First round
1	(Moldova) Radu Albot	6	1	1
Alt	(Czech Republic) Dalibor Svrčina	3	6	6
Alt	(United States) Reilly Opelka	6^{4}	6	3
8	(Kazakhstan) Denis Yevseyev	7^{7}	4	6

Qualifying competition
Alt	(Czech Republic) Dalibor Svrčina	6	4	4
8	(Kazakhstan) Denis Yevseyev	0	6	6

==== Second qualifier ====
First round
2	(Argentina) Marco Trungelliti	6	3	6
(Japan) Yosuke Watanuki	1	6	3
(Australia) James McCabe	6^{4}	7	6
5	(United States) Mackenzie McDonald	7^{7}	5	4

Qualifying competition
2	(Argentina) Marco Trungelliti	6	6
(Australia) James McCabe	2	3

==== Third qualifier ====
First round
3	(United States) Mitchell Krueger	6	6
(Colombia) Nicolás Mejía	4	2
(United States) Maxime Cressy	4	0
6	(Japan) Yasutaka Uchiyama	6	6

Qualifying competition
3	(United States) Mitchell Krueger	4	3
6	(Japan) Yasutaka Uchiyama	6	6

==== Fourth qualifier ====
First round
4	(Hong Kong) Coleman Wong	6	6
WC	(China) Xiao Linang	3	2
WC	(China) Te Rigele	6	6
7	(United States) Emilio Nava	4	4

Qualifying competition
4	(Hong Kong) Coleman Wong	6^{9}	6	6
WC	(China) Te Rigele	7^{11}	4	4
