= 2024 Hangzhou Open – Doubles =

Doubles
- 2024 Hangzhou Open

Final
- Champions: (India) Jeevan Nedunchezhiyan (India) Vijay Sundar Prashanth
- Runners-up: (Germany) Constantin Frantzen (Germany) Hendrik Jebens
- Score: 4–6, 7–6^{(7–5)}, [10–7]

Details
- Draw: 28 (2WC)
- Seeds: 8

Events
Singles	Doubles
Hangzhou Open	· 2025 →

Jeevan Nedunchezhiyan and Vijay Sundar Prashanth defeated Constantin Frantzen and Hendrik Jebens in the final, 4–6, 7–6^{(7–5)}, [10–7] to win the inaugural doubles tennis title at the 2024 Hangzhou Open. It was Prashanth's first ATP Tour doubles title and Nedunchezhiyan's second.

== Seeds ==
1. (United States) Nathaniel Lammons / (United States) Jackson Withrow (first round)
2. (United Kingdom) Julian Cash / (United Kingdom) Lloyd Glasspool (quarterfinals)
3. (Uruguay) Ariel Behar / (United States) Robert Galloway (semifinals)
4. (United Kingdom) Jamie Murray / (Australia) John Peers (quarterfinals)

== Draw ==
=== Key ===
- Q = Qualifier
- WC = Wild card
- LL = Lucky loser
- Alt = Alternate
- ITF = ITF entry
- PR = Protected ranking
- SR = Special ranking
- SE = Special exempt
- JE = Junior exempt
- JR = Junior Accelerator Programme entrant
- CO = College Accelerator Programme entrant
- NG = Next Gen Accelerator Program entrant
- w/o = Walkover
- r = Retired
- d = Defaulted

=== Draw ===
First round
1	(United States) N Lammons (United States) J Withrow	1	6	[8]
(Moldova) R Albot (Germany) M Marterer	6	2	[10]
(Austria) A Erler (Netherlands) M Middelkoop	5	7^{7}	[5]
(Germany) C Frantzen (Germany) H Jebens	7	6^{5}	[10]
4	(United Kingdom) J Murray (Australia) J Peers	7	7
(Japan) Y Nishioka (Japan) K Uesugi	5	5
Alt	(Australia) R Hijikata (United States) M McDonald	6	7
(India) RC Bollipalli (India) A Kadhe	3	5
WC	(China) Y Bu (China) R Te	6	6
WC	(China) Y Jin (China) Z Li	3	4
Alt	(New Zealand) R Statham (United States) Z Svajda	6^{3}	2
3	(Uruguay) A Behar (United States) R Galloway	7^{7}	6
(Australia) B Bayldon (Australia) T Fancutt	6^{4}	6	[7]
(India) J Nedunchezhiyan (India) VS Prashanth	7^{7}	4	[10]
(Colombia) N Barrientos (Tunisia) S Mansouri	3	7^{7}	[5]
2	(United Kingdom) J Cash (United Kingdom) L Glasspool	6	6^{4}	[10]

Quarterfinals
(Moldova) R Albot (Germany) M Marterer
(Germany) C Frantzen (Germany) H Jebens	w/o
4	(United Kingdom) J Murray (Australia) J Peers	6	6^{3}	[5]
Alt	(Australia) R Hijikata (United States) M McDonald	3	7^{7}	[10]
WC	(China) Y Bu (China) R Te	6^{7}	3
3	(Uruguay) A Behar (United States) R Galloway	7^{9}	6
(India) J Nedunchezhiyan (India) VS Prashanth	6^{4}	7^{8}	[10]
2	(United Kingdom) J Cash (United Kingdom) L Glasspool	7^{7}	6^{6}	[8]

Semifinals
(Germany) C Frantzen (Germany) H Jebens	w/o
Alt	(Australia) R Hijikata (United States) M McDonald
3	(Uruguay) A Behar (United States) R Galloway	6	2	[4]
(India) J Nedunchezhiyan (India) VS Prashanth	0	6	[10]

Final
(Germany) C Frantzen (Germany) H Jebens	6	6^{5}	[7]
(India) J Nedunchezhiyan (India) VS Prashanth	4	7^{7}	[10]
