= 2023 Heilbronner Neckarcup – Singles =

Singles
- 2023 Heilbronner Neckarcup

Final
- Champion: (Italy) Matteo Arnaldi
- Runner-up: (Argentina) Facundo Díaz Acosta
- Score: 7–6^{(7–4)}, 6–1

Events
Singles	Doubles
← 2022 ·	Heilbronner Neckarcup	· 2024 →

Daniel Altmaier was the defending champion but chose not to defend his title.

Matteo Arnaldi won the title after defeating Facundo Díaz Acosta 7–6^{(7–4)}, 6–1 in the final.

== Seeds ==
1. (Italy) Marco Cecchinato (first round)
2. (Spain) Jaume Munar (quarterfinals)
3. (Colombia) Daniel Elahi Galán (quarterfinals)
4. (Austria) Dominic Thiem (second round)
5. (Italy) Matteo Arnaldi (champion)
6. (Hungary) Fábián Marozsán (second round)
7. (Germany) Oscar Otte (first round)
8. Pavel Kotov (quarterfinals)

== Draw ==
=== Key ===
- Q = Qualifier
- WC = Wild card
- LL = Lucky loser
- Alt = Alternate
- ITF = ITF entry
- PR = Protected ranking
- SR = Special ranking
- SE = Special exempt
- JE = Junior exempt
- JR = Junior Accelerator Programme entrant
- CO = College Accelerator Programme entrant
- NG = Next Gen Accelerator Program entrant
- w/o = Walkover
- r = Retired
- d = Defaulted

=== Finals ===
Semifinals
(Argentina) Facundo Díaz Acosta	7	6
WC	(Germany) Rudolf Molleker	5	3
(Spain) Pedro Martínez	6^{4}	5
5	(Italy) Matteo Arnaldi	7^{7}	7

Final
(Argentina) Facundo Díaz Acosta	6^{4}	1
5	(Italy) Matteo Arnaldi	7^{7}	6

=== Top half ===
First round
1	(Italy) M Cecchinato	5	3
Q	(Australia) A Santillan	7	6
(Slovakia) J Kovalík	3	6	7^{7}
(Germany) M Marterer	6	2	6^{5}
LL	(France) M Janvier	6	6
Q	(Germany) Lucas Gerch	4	3
(Argentina) F Díaz Acosta	6	6^{1}	6
7	(Germany) O Otte	4	7^{7}	1
3	(Colombia) DE Galán	6	7^{7}
Alt	(Turkey) C İlkel	4	6^{3}
Q	(Switzerland) J Kym	6^{2}	3
(Brazil) F Meligeni Alves	7^{7}	6
Q	(Germany) S Fanselow	4	7^{7}	1
WC	(Germany) R Molleker	6	6^{5}	6
Alt	(Argentina) H Casanova	3	4
6	(Hungary) F Marozsán	6	6

Second round
Q	(Australia) A Santillan	6	3	6
(Slovakia) J Kovalík	2	6	3
LL	(France) M Janvier	1	6	6^{5}
(Argentina) F Díaz Acosta	6	3	7^{7}
3	(Colombia) DE Galán	5	6	6
(Brazil) F Meligeni Alves	7	0	2
WC	(Germany) R Molleker	7	6
6	(Hungary) F Marozsán	5	4

Quarterfinals
Q	(Australia) A Santillan	5	3
(Argentina) F Díaz Acosta	7	6
3	(Colombia) DE Galán	4	7	5
WC	(Germany) R Molleker	6	5	7

Semifinals
(Argentina) F Díaz Acosta	7	6
WC	(Germany) R Molleker	5	3

=== Bottom half ===
First round
8	P Kotov	7^{8}	6
(Italy) A Pellegrino	6^{6}	2
Q	(Germany) MH Rehberg	2	4^{r}
Alt	(France) D Added	6	5
Q	(Germany) H Squire	4	2
(Spain) P Martínez	6	6
(Japan) K Uchida	4	4
4/WC	(Austria) D Thiem	6	6
5	(Italy) M Arnaldi	7	6
(Slovakia) N Gombos	5	3
(Ukraine) O Krutykh	4	4
WC	(Germany) M Topo	6	6
(Bosnia and Herzegovina) D Džumhur	5	1
(Kazakhstan) T Skatov	7	6
(Bolivia) H Dellien	1	1
2	(Spain) J Munar	6	6

Second round
8	P Kotov	6	6
Alt	(France) D Added	2	2
(Spain) P Martínez	2	6	6
4/WC	(Austria) D Thiem	6	3	1
5	(Italy) M Arnaldi	2	6	6
WC	(Germany) M Topo	6	3	1
(Kazakhstan) T Skatov	2	5
2	(Spain) J Munar	6	7

Quarterfinals
8	P Kotov	4	6	6^{3}
(Spain) P Martínez	6	4	7^{7}
5	(Italy) M Arnaldi	1	6	7
2	(Spain) J Munar	6	4	5

Semifinals
(Spain) P Martínez	6^{4}	5
5	(Italy) M Arnaldi	7^{7}	7
