= 2023 Open d'Orléans – Doubles =

Tennis tournament in France

Doubles
- 2023 Open d'Orléans

Final
- Champions: (Germany) Constantin Frantzen (Germany) Hendrik Jebens
- Runners-up: (United Kingdom) Henry Patten (Australia) John-Patrick Smith
- Score: 7–6^{(7–5)}, 7–6^{(14–12)}

Events
Singles	Doubles
← 2022 ·	Open d'Orléans	· 2024 →

Nicolas Mahut and Édouard Roger-Vasselin were the defending champions but only Mahut chose to defend his title, partnering Pierre-Hugues Herbert. Mahut lost in the quarterfinals to Constantin Frantzen and Hendrik Jebens.

Frantzen and Jebens won the title after defeating Henry Patten and John-Patrick Smith 7–6^{(7–5)}, 7–6^{(14–12)} in the final.

== Seeds ==
1. (United Kingdom) Julian Cash / (United States) Robert Galloway (first round)
2. (France) Pierre-Hugues Herbert / (France) Nicolas Mahut (quarterfinals)
3. (United States) Maxime Cressy / (France) Albano Olivetti (first round)
4. (Mexico) Miguel Ángel Reyes-Varela / (Spain) David Vega Hernández (first round)

== Draw ==
=== Key ===
- Q = Qualifier
- WC = Wild card
- LL = Lucky loser
- Alt = Alternate
- ITF = ITF entry
- PR = Protected ranking
- SR = Special ranking
- SE = Special exempt
- JE = Junior exempt
- JR = Junior Accelerator Programme entrant
- CO = College Accelerator Programme entrant
- NG = Next Gen Accelerator Program entrant
- w/o = Walkover
- r = Retired
- d = Defaulted

First round
1	(United Kingdom) J Cash (United States) R Galloway	4	1
WC	(France) G Debru (France) A Hoang	6	6
(Romania) VV Cornea (Austria) P Oswald	6	3	[10]
(United Kingdom) H Patten (Australia) J-P Smith	4	6	[12]
3	(United States) M Cressy (France) A Olivetti	6^{7}	5
(France) A Escoffier (Switzerland) M-A Hüsler	7^{9}	7
(Spain) S Martos Gornés (Netherlands) S Verbeek	6	6^{5}	[11]
I Liutarevich (Ukraine) V Manafov	4	7^{7}	[9]
(Netherlands) S Arends (Netherlands) D Pel	6	6
(Czech Republic) T Macháč (Slovakia) A Molčan	1	3
(Colombia) N Barrientos (France) J Eysseric	7^{7}	6
4	(Mexico) MÁ Reyes-Varela (Spain) D Vega Hernández	6^{1}	2
(Germany) C Frantzen (Germany) H Jebens	6	6
WC	(France) M Bourgue (France) B Paire	0	3
(Finland) P Niklas-Salminen (Greece) Pe Tsitsipas	6^{3}	2
2	(France) P-H Herbert (France) N Mahut	7^{7}	6

Quarterfinals
WC	(France) G Debru (France) A Hoang	6^{2}	4
(United Kingdom) H Patten (Australia) J-P Smith	7^{7}	6
(France) A Escoffier (Switzerland) M-A Hüsler	4	6^{4}
(Spain) S Martos Gornés (Netherlands) S Verbeek	6	7^{7}
(Netherlands) S Arends (Netherlands) D Pel	6	3	[10]
(Colombia) N Barrientos (France) J Eysseric	4	6	[7]
(Germany) C Frantzen (Germany) H Jebens	7^{7}	6
2	(France) P-H Herbert (France) N Mahut	6^{5}	4

Semifinals
(United Kingdom) H Patten (Australia) J-P Smith	6	7
(Spain) S Martos Gornés (Netherlands) S Verbeek	3	5
(Netherlands) S Arends (Netherlands) D Pel
(Germany) C Frantzen (Germany) H Jebens	w/o

Final
(United Kingdom) H Patten (Australia) J-P Smith	6^{5}	6^{12}
(Germany) C Frantzen (Germany) H Jebens	7^{7}	7^{14}
