= 2025 Mutua Madrid Open – Men's doubles =

Men's doubles
- 2025 Mutua Madrid Open

Final
- Champions: (Spain) Marcel Granollers (Argentina) Horacio Zeballos
- Runners-up: (El Salvador) Marcelo Arévalo (Croatia) Mate Pavić
- Score: 6–4, 6–4

Events
Singles	men	women
Doubles	men	women
← 2024 ·	Mutua Madrid Open	· 2026 →

Marcel Granollers and Horacio Zeballos defeated Marcelo Arévalo and Mate Pavić in the final, 6–4, 6–4 to win the men's doubles tennis title at the 2025 Madrid Open.

Sebastian Korda and Jordan Thompson were the reigning champions, but Thompson withdrew before the tournament began. Korda partnered Ivan Dodig, but lost in the first round to Alexander Erler and Constantin Frantzen.

Rohan Bopanna extended his own record as the oldest man to win a Masters 1000 match by winning his first-round match.

== Seeds ==
1. (El Salvador) Marcelo Arévalo / (Croatia) Mate Pavić (final)
2. (Finland) Harri Heliövaara / (United Kingdom) Henry Patten (quarterfinals)
3. (Germany) Kevin Krawietz / (Germany) Tim Pütz (semifinals)
4. (Italy) Simone Bolelli / (Italy) Andrea Vavassori (first round)
5. (Spain) Marcel Granollers / (Argentina) Horacio Zeballos (champions)
6. (Croatia) Nikola Mektić / (New Zealand) Michael Venus (quarterfinals)
7. (United Kingdom) Julian Cash / (United Kingdom) Lloyd Glasspool (withdrew)
8. (United States) Nathaniel Lammons / (United States) Jackson Withrow (first round)

== Draw ==
=== Key ===
- Q = Qualifier
- WC = Wild card
- LL = Lucky loser
- Alt = Alternate
- ITF = ITF entry
- PR = Protected ranking
- SR = Special ranking
- SE = Special exempt
- JE = Junior exempt
- JR = Junior Accelerator Programme entrant
- CO = College Accelerator Programme entrant
- NG = Next Gen Accelerator Program entrant
- w/o = Walkover
- r = Retired
- d = Defaulted

=== Finals ===
Semifinals
1	(El Salvador) Marcelo Arévalo (Croatia) Mate Pavić	6^{8}	7	[10]
(United States) Christian Harrison (United States) Evan King	7^{10}	5	[6]
3	(Germany) Kevin Krawietz (Germany) Tim Pütz	6^{6}	5
5	(Spain) Marcel Granollers (Argentina) Horacio Zeballos	7^{8}	7

Final
1	(El Salvador) Marcelo Arévalo (Croatia) Mate Pavić	4	4
5	(Spain) Marcel Granollers (Argentina) Horacio Zeballos	6	6

=== Top half ===
First round
1	(El Salvador) M Arévalo (Croatia) M Pavić	6	6
(Brazil) R Matos (Brazil) M Melo	3	4
(United Kingdom) J Murray (United States) R Ram	6	6
Alt	(Mexico) S González (United States) A Krajicek	4	4
(Italy) F Cobolli (Italy) L Musetti	6	5	[11]
(France) S Doumbia (France) F Reboul	3	7	[9]
(Uruguay) A Behar (Belgium) J Vliegen	5	6	[7]
6	(Croatia) N Mektić (New Zealand) M Venus	7	3	[10]
4	(Italy) S Bolelli (Italy) A Vavassori	2	6	[8]
(United Kingdom) J Salisbury (United Kingdom) N Skupski	6	4	[10]
(United States) C Harrison (United States) E King	6	7^{7}
(Australia) M Ebden (Australia) J Peers	4	6^{5}
Alt	(Brazil) F Romboli (Australia) J-P Smith	0	3
(Argentina) M González (Argentina) A Molteni	6	6
(India) R Bopanna (United States) B Shelton	6^{5}	7	[10]
8	(United States) N Lammons (United States) J Withrow	7^{7}	5	[7]

Second round
1	(El Salvador) M Arévalo (Croatia) M Pavić	6	3	[10]
(United Kingdom) J Murray (United States) R Ram	1	6	[4]
(Italy) F Cobolli (Italy) L Musetti	3	6^{4}
6	(Croatia) N Mektić (New Zealand) M Venus	6	7^{7}
(United Kingdom) J Salisbury (United Kingdom) N Skupski	3	5
(United States) C Harrison (United States) E King	6	7
(Argentina) M González (Argentina) A Molteni	6	6^{5}	[11]
(India) R Bopanna (United States) B Shelton	4	7^{7}	[9]

Quarterfinals
1	(El Salvador) M Arévalo (Croatia) M Pavić	6^{5}	6	[10]
6	(Croatia) N Mektić (New Zealand) M Venus	7^{7}	4	[5]
(United States) C Harrison (United States) E King	6	6
(Argentina) M González (Argentina) A Molteni	4	2

Semifinals
1	(El Salvador) M Arévalo (Croatia) M Pavić	6^{8}	7	[10]
(United States) C Harrison (United States) E King	7^{10}	5	[6]

=== Bottom half ===
First round
Alt	(Germany) H Jebens (Austria) L Miedler	7^{7}	4	[8]
(Belgium) S Gillé (Poland) J Zieliński	6^{5}	6	[10]
Alt	(France) G Jacq (France) A Müller	1	3
(Czech Republic) T Macháč (United States) T Paul	6	6
(Sweden) A Göransson (Netherlands) S Verbeek	5	7^{12}	[10]
(Czech Republic) J Menšík (Czech Republic) A Pavlásek	7	6^{10}	[8]
WC	(Monaco) R Arneodo (France) M Guinard	6^{4}	6	[11]
3	(Germany) K Krawietz (Germany) T Pütz	7^{7}	4	[13]
5	(Spain) M Granollers (Argentina) H Zeballos	6	6
Alt	(Netherlands) S Arends (United Kingdom) L Johnson	4	2
(France) G Mpetshi Perricard (France) A Olivetti	2	7^{7}	[10]
WC	(Spain) A Davidovich Fokina (United States) F Tiafoe	6	6^{3}	[5]
(Croatia) I Dodig (United States) S Korda	3	4
(Austria) A Erler (Germany) C Frantzen	6	6
(India) Y Bhambri (United States) R Galloway	3	6^{4}
2	(Finland) H Heliövaara (United Kingdom) H Patten	6	7^{7}

Second round
(Belgium) S Gillé (Poland) J Zieliński	6	6
(Czech Republic) T Macháč (United States) T Paul	4	3
(Sweden) A Göransson (Netherlands) S Verbeek	7^{8}	5	[7]
3	(Germany) K Krawietz (Germany) T Pütz	6^{6}	7	[10]
5	(Spain) M Granollers (Argentina) H Zeballos	6	7^{7}
(France) G Mpetshi Perricard (France) A Olivetti	4	6^{5}
(Austria) A Erler (Germany) C Frantzen	4	4
2	(Finland) H Heliövaara (United Kingdom) H Patten	6	6

Quarterfinals
(Belgium) S Gillé (Poland) J Zieliński	3	4
3	(Germany) K Krawietz (Germany) T Pütz	6	6
5	(Spain) M Granollers (Argentina) H Zeballos	7^{7}	6
2	(Finland) H Heliövaara (United Kingdom) H Patten	6^{3}	3

Semifinals
3	(Germany) K Krawietz (Germany) T Pütz	6^{6}	5
5	(Spain) M Granollers (Argentina) H Zeballos	7^{8}	7

== Seeded teams ==
The following are the seeded teams. Seedings are based on ATP rankings as of 21 April 2025.

Country	Player	Country	Player	Rank	Seed
ESA	Marcelo Arévalo	CRO	Mate Pavić	2	1
FIN	Harri Heliövaara	GBR	Henry Patten	7	2
GER	Kevin Krawietz	GER	Tim Pütz	13	3
ITA	Simone Bolelli	ITA	Andrea Vavassori	17	4
ESP	Marcel Granollers	ARG	Horacio Zeballos	21	5
CRO	Nikola Mektić	NZL	Michael Venus	29	6
~~GBR~~	~~Julian Cash~~	~~GBR~~	~~Lloyd Glasspool~~	~~29~~	~~7~~
USA	Nathaniel Lammons	USA	Jackson Withrow	37	8

== Other entry information ==
=== Wildcards ===
- (Monaco) Romain Arneodo / (France) Manuel Guinard
- (Spain) Alejandro Davidovich Fokina / (United States) Frances Tiafoe
- ~~(France) Arthur Fils / (Norway) Casper Ruud~~

=== Alternates ===
- (Netherlands) Sander Arends / (United Kingdom) Luke Johnson
- (Mexico) Santiago González / (United States) Austin Krajicek
- (France) Grégoire Jacq / (France) Alexandre Müller
- (Germany) Hendrik Jebens / (Austria) Lucas Miedler
- (Brazil) Fernando Romboli / (Australia) John-Patrick Smith

=== Withdrawals ===
- (France) Théo Arribagé / (Argentina) Francisco Cerúndolo → replaced by (Brazil) Fernando Romboli / (Australia) John-Patrick Smith
- (United Kingdom) Julian Cash / (United Kingdom) Lloyd Glasspool → replaced by (Germany) Hendrik Jebens / (Austria) Lucas Miedler
- (France) Arthur Fils / (Norway) Casper Ruud → replaced by (Netherlands) Sander Arends / (United Kingdom) Luke Johnson
- Karen Khachanov / Andrey Rublev → replaced by (France) Grégoire Jacq / (France) Alexandre Müller
- (United States) Sebastian Korda / (Australia) Jordan Thompson → replaced by (Croatia) Ivan Dodig / (United States) Sebastian Korda
- (United States) Alex Michelsen / (Chile) Alejandro Tabilo → replaced by (Austria) Alexander Erler / (Germany) Constantin Frantzen
- (Monaco) Hugo Nys / (France) Édouard Roger-Vasselin → replaced by (Mexico) Santiago González / (United States) Austin Krajicek
