= 2025 US Open – Men's doubles =

Tennis championship

Men's doubles
- 2025 US Open

Final
- Champions: (Spain) Marcel Granollers (Argentina) Horacio Zeballos
- Runners-up: (United Kingdom) Joe Salisbury (United Kingdom) Neal Skupski
- Score: 3–6, 7–6^{(7–4)}, 7–5
- Date: September 6, 2025

Details
- Draw: 64
- Seeds: 16

Events
Singles	men	women		boys	girls
Doubles	men	women	mixed	boys	girls
WC Singles	men	women	quad	boys	girls
WC Doubles	men	women	quad	boys	girls
- US Open

Marcel Granollers and Horacio Zeballos defeated Joe Salisbury and Neal Skupski in the final, 3–6, 7–6^{(7–4)}, 7–5 to win the men's doubles tennis title at the 2025 US Open. They saved three championship points en route to the title. It was the second major title for both players, following the 2025 French Open.

Max Purcell and Jordan Thompson were the reigning champions, but Purcell did not participate as he was serving a suspension for violating anti-doping rules. Thompson partnered Matthew Ebden, but lost in the first round to Karol Drzewiecki and Marcus Willis.

Lloyd Glasspool retained the ATP No. 1 doubles ranking after Marcelo Arévalo and Mate Pavić lost in the second round.

This tournament marked the final major appearances of five-time major doubles champion and former world No. 1 Nicolas Mahut, who partnered Giovanni Mpetshi Perricard; they lost in the first round to Kevin Krawietz and Tim Pütz, two-time major doubles champion and former world No. 1 Rohan Bopanna, who partnered Romain Arneodo; they lost in the first round to Robert Cash and JJ Tracy, and seven-time major doubles champion and Olympic silver medalist Ivan Dodig and seven-time major doubles champion and former world No. 1 Jamie Murray; they lost in the first round to Rafael Matos and Marcelo Melo.

== Seeds ==
1. (United Kingdom) Julian Cash / (United Kingdom) Lloyd Glasspool (first round)
2. (El Salvador) Marcelo Arévalo / (Croatia) Mate Pavić (second round)
3. (Finland) Harri Heliövaara / (United Kingdom) Henry Patten (first round)
4. (Germany) Kevin Krawietz / (Germany) Tim Pütz (third round)
5. (Spain) Marcel Granollers / (Argentina) Horacio Zeballos (champions)
6. (United Kingdom) Joe Salisbury / (United Kingdom) Neal Skupski (final)
7. (Italy) Simone Bolelli / (Italy) Andrea Vavassori (second round)
8. (United States) Christian Harrison / (United States) Evan King (first round)
9. (Monaco) Hugo Nys / (France) Édouard Roger-Vasselin (third round)
10. (Argentina) Máximo González / (Argentina) Andrés Molteni (third round)
11. (Croatia) Nikola Mektić / (United States) Rajeev Ram (quarterfinals)
12. (Portugal) Francisco Cabral / (Austria) Lucas Miedler (second round)
13. (Netherlands) Sander Arends / (United Kingdom) Luke Johnson (second round)
14. (India) Yuki Bhambri / (New Zealand) Michael Venus (semifinals)
15. (France) Sadio Doumbia / (France) Fabien Reboul (quarterfinals)
16. (Australia) Matthew Ebden / (Australia) Jordan Thompson (first round)

Click on the seed number of a player to go to their draw section.

== Draw ==
Key

- Q = Qualifier
- WC = Wild card
- LL = Lucky loser
- Alt = Alternate
- ITF = ITF entry
- PR = Protected ranking
- SR = Special ranking
- SE = Special exempt
- JE = Junior exempt
- JR = Junior Accelerator Programme entrant
- CO = College Accelerator Programme entrant
- NG = Next Gen Accelerator Program entrant
- w/o = Walkover
- r = Retired
- d = Defaulted

=== Finals ===
Quarterfinals
15	(France) Sadio Doumbia (France) Fabien Reboul	1	6^{7}
(United States) Robert Cash (United States) JJ Tracy	6	7^{9}
(Germany) Constantin Frantzen (Netherlands) Robin Haase	5	6	3
5	(Spain) Marcel Granollers (Argentina) Horacio Zeballos	7	3	6
11	(Croatia) Nikola Mektić (United States) Rajeev Ram	3	7^{8}	3
14	(India) Yuki Bhambri (New Zealand) Michael Venus	6	6^{6}	6
6	(United Kingdom) Joe Salisbury (United Kingdom) Neal Skupski	7^{8}	6
(Czech Republic) Tomáš Macháč (Czech Republic) Matěj Vocel	6^{6}	3

Semifinals
(United States) Robert Cash (United States) JJ Tracy	3	6	1
5	(Spain) Marcel Granollers (Argentina) Horacio Zeballos	6	3	6
14	(India) Yuki Bhambri (New Zealand) Michael Venus	7^{7}	6^{5}	4
6	(United Kingdom) Joe Salisbury (United Kingdom) Neal Skupski	6^{2}	7^{7}	6

Final
5	(Spain) Marcel Granollers (Argentina) Horacio Zeballos	3	7^{7}	7
6	(United Kingdom) Joe Salisbury (United Kingdom) Neal Skupski	6	6^{4}	5

=== Top half ===
==== Section 1 ====
First round
1	(United Kingdom) J Cash (United Kingdom) L Glasspool	6^{6}	6^{4}
(Austria) A Erler (United States) R Galloway	7^{8}	7^{7}
Alt	(Australia) B Bayldon (Australia) A Walton	6^{3}	4
(Germany) J Schnaitter (Germany) M Wallner	7^{7}	6
(Brazil) R Matos (Brazil) M Melo	6	6
(Croatia) I Dodig (United Kingdom) J Murray	4	3
(Sweden) A Göransson (Netherlands) S Verbeek	3	3
15	(France) S Doumbia (France) F Reboul	6	6
10	(Argentina) M González (Argentina) A Molteni	6	6
(Mexico) S González (United States) A Krajicek	1	4
(France) T Arribagé (France) B Bonzi	7^{7}	4	6^{6}
Alt	(Canada) C Harper (Netherlands) J-J Rojer	6^{2}	6	7^{10}
(Monaco) R Arneodo (India) R Bopanna	4	3
(United States) R Cash (United States) JJ Tracy	6	6
(Spain) P Martínez (Spain) J Munar	6^{4}	6	2
7	(Italy) S Bolelli (Italy) A Vavassori	7^{7}	4	6

Second round
(Austria) A Erler (United States) R Galloway	6^{4}	7	6^{9}
(Germany) J Schnaitter (Germany) M Wallner	7^{7}	5	7^{11}
(Brazil) R Matos (Brazil) M Melo	3	4
15	(France) S Doumbia (France) F Reboul	6	6
10	(Argentina) M González (Argentina) A Molteni	6	6
Alt	(Canada) C Harper (Netherlands) J-J Rojer	2	4
(United States) R Cash (United States) JJ Tracy	6^{4}	7^{7}	7^{10}
7	(Italy) S Bolelli (Italy) A Vavassori	7^{7}	6^{2}	6^{8}

Third round
(Germany) J Schnaitter (Germany) M Wallner	6^{5}	6	3
15	(France) S Doumbia (France) F Reboul	7^{7}	3	6
10	(Argentina) M González (Argentina) A Molteni	3	3
(United States) R Cash (United States) JJ Tracy	6	6

Quarterfinals
15	(France) S Doumbia (France) F Reboul	1	6^{7}
(United States) R Cash (United States) JJ Tracy	6	7^{9}

==== Section 2 ====
First round
3	(Finland) H Heliövaara (United Kingdom) H Patten	7^{7}	6^{9}	5
(Germany) C Frantzen (Netherlands) R Haase	6^{5}	7^{11}	7
(Brazil) O Luz (France) A Olivetti	5	7	6
PR	(France) A Mannarino (Finland) E Ruusuvuori	7	5	2
(Argentina) TM Etcheverry (Argentina) C Ugo Carabelli	6	6^{2}	6
(Bosnia and Herzegovina) D Džumhur (United States) A Kovacevic	1	7^{7}	3
(Italy) M Bellucci (Hungary) F Marozsán	2	4
13	(Netherlands) S Arends (United Kingdom) L Johnson	6	6
12	(Portugal) F Cabral (Austria) L Miedler	7^{8}	6
(Colombia) N Barrientos (United States) N Lammons	6^{6}	4
(Czech Republic) A Pavlásek (Poland) J Zieliński	7^{7}	7^{7}
(Uruguay) A Behar (Belgium) J Vliegen	6^{2}	6^{2}
WC	(United States) M McDonald (United States) E Quinn	4	7^{8}	6
WC	(United States) T Hilderbrand (United States) P Trhac	6	6^{6}	4
(Serbia) M Kecmanović (Serbia) H Medjedovic	3	6^{2}
5	(Spain) M Granollers (Argentina) H Zeballos	6	7^{7}

Second round
(Germany) C Frantzen (Netherlands) R Haase	6^{5}	7^{8}	6
(Brazil) O Luz (France) A Olivetti	7^{7}	6^{6}	4
(Argentina) TM Etcheverry (Argentina) C Ugo Carabelli	7	7^{8}
13	(Netherlands) S Arends (United Kingdom) L Johnson	5	6^{6}
12	(Portugal) F Cabral (Austria) L Miedler	4	4
(Czech Republic) A Pavlásek (Poland) J Zieliński	6	6
WC	(United States) M McDonald (United States) E Quinn	2	2
5	(Spain) M Granollers (Argentina) H Zeballos	6	6

Third round
(Germany) C Frantzen (Netherlands) R Haase	6	6
(Argentina) TM Etcheverry (Argentina) C Ugo Carabelli	3	4
(Czech Republic) A Pavlásek (Poland) J Zieliński	7^{7}	3	6^{4}
5	(Spain) M Granollers (Argentina) H Zeballos	6^{1}	6	7^{10}

Quarterfinals
(Germany) C Frantzen (Netherlands) R Haase	5	6	3
5	(Spain) M Granollers (Argentina) H Zeballos	7	3	6

=== Bottom half ===
==== Section 3 ====
First round
8	(United States) C Harrison (United States) E King	6	3	4
Alt	(India) A Chandrasekar (India) VS Prashanth	3	6	6
(Kazakhstan) A Bublik (Brazil) M Demoliner	3	2
(Brazil) F Romboli (Australia) J-P Smith	6	6
(Chinese Taipei) R Ho (Germany) H Jebens	3	7^{7}	7^{10}
WC	(United States) T Boyer (United States) E Nava	6	6^{5}	6^{7}
(Argentina) G Andreozzi (France) M Guinard	5	6^{4}
11	(Croatia) N Mektić (United States) R Ram	7	7^{7}
14	(India) Y Bhambri (New Zealand) M Venus	6	6
(United States) M Giron (United States) L Tien	0	3
Alt	(Ecuador) G Escobar (Mexico) MÁ Reyes-Varela	6	7^{7}
WC	(United States) B Holt (United States) C Smith	4	6^{4}
WC	(United States) C Williams (United States) T Winegar	7^{9}	6
(Czech Republic) P Nouza (Czech Republic) P Rikl	6^{7}	4
PR	(France) N Mahut (France) G Mpetshi Perricard	6^{4}	5
4	(Germany) K Krawietz (Germany) T Pütz	7^{7}	7

Second round
Alt	(India) A Chandrasekar (India) VS Prashanth	4	3
(Brazil) F Romboli (Australia) J-P Smith	6	6
(Chinese Taipei) R Ho (Germany) H Jebens	6	6^{2}	3
11	(Croatia) N Mektić (United States) R Ram	4	7^{7}	6
14	(India) Y Bhambri (New Zealand) M Venus	6	7
Alt	(Ecuador) G Escobar (Mexico) MÁ Reyes-Varela	1	5
WC	(United States) C Williams (United States) T Winegar	6^{7}	6^{3}
4	(Germany) K Krawietz (Germany) T Pütz	7^{9}	7^{7}

Third round
(Brazil) F Romboli (Australia) J-P Smith	7^{9}	5	5
11	(Croatia) N Mektić (United States) R Ram	6^{7}	7	7
14	(India) Y Bhambri (New Zealand) M Venus	6	6
4	(Germany) K Krawietz (Germany) T Pütz	4	4

Quarterfinals
11	(Croatia) N Mektić (United States) R Ram	3	7^{8}	3
14	(India) Y Bhambri (New Zealand) M Venus	6	6^{6}	6

==== Section 4 ====
First round
6	(United Kingdom) J Salisbury (United Kingdom) N Skupski	6	6
WC	(United States) G Goldhoff (United States) R Stalder	3	4
(Belgium) D Goffin (France) A Müller	0	1
WC	(United States) M Exsted (United States) C Woestendick	6	6
(India) S Balaji (India) RC Bollipalli	6	6^{8}	4
(United States) V Kirkov (Netherlands) B Stevens	3	7^{10}	6
(Australia) R Hijikata (Netherlands) D Pel	6^{2}	6^{2}
9	(Monaco) H Nys (France) É Roger-Vasselin	7^{7}	7^{7}
16	(Australia) M Ebden (Australia) J Thompson	6^{5}	2
Alt	(Poland) K Drzewiecki (United Kingdom) M Willis	7^{7}	6
(Australia) J Peers (United States) J Withrow	7^{7}	1	7^{10}
(Belgium) Z Bergs (Belgium) R Collignon	6^{5}	6	6^{7}
(Australia) MC Romios (United States) R Seggerman	6^{13}	7	3
(Czech Republic) T Macháč (Czech Republic) M Vocel	7^{15}	5	6
(Ecuador) D Hidalgo (India) A Kadhe	7	6^{4}	4
2	(El Salvador) M Arévalo (Croatia) M Pavić	5	7^{7}	6

Second round
6	(United Kingdom) J Salisbury (United Kingdom) N Skupski	6	1	6
WC	(United States) M Exsted (United States) C Woestendick	4	6	3
(United States) V Kirkov (Netherlands) B Stevens	3	1
9	(Monaco) H Nys (France) É Roger-Vasselin	6	6
Alt	(Poland) K Drzewiecki (United Kingdom) M Willis	3	6	7^{13}
(Australia) J Peers (United States) J Withrow	6	3	6^{11}
(Czech Republic) T Macháč (Czech Republic) M Vocel	5	7^{7}	7
2	(El Salvador) M Arévalo (Croatia) M Pavić	7	6^{4}	5

Third round
6	(United Kingdom) J Salisbury (United Kingdom) N Skupski	4	7^{7}	6
9	(Monaco) H Nys (France) É Roger-Vasselin	6	6^{3}	4
Alt	(Poland) K Drzewiecki (United Kingdom) M Willis	6	3	1
(Czech Republic) T Macháč (Czech Republic) M Vocel	4	6	6

Quarterfinals
6	(United Kingdom) J Salisbury (United Kingdom) N Skupski	7^{8}	6
(Czech Republic) T Macháč (Czech Republic) M Vocel	6^{6}	3

== Seeded teams ==
The following are the seeded teams. Seedings are based on ATP rankings as of August 25, 2025.

Country	Player	Country	Player	Rank	Seed
GBR	Julian Cash	GBR	Lloyd Glasspool	3	1
ESA	Marcelo Arévalo	CRO	Mate Pavić	6	2
FIN	Harri Heliövaara	GBR	Henry Patten	10	3
GER	Kevin Krawietz	GER	Tim Pütz	15	4
ESP	Marcel Granollers	ARG	Horacio Zeballos	25	5
GBR	Joe Salisbury	GBR	Neal Skupski	25	6
ITA	Simone Bolelli	ITA	Andrea Vavassori	25	7
USA	Christian Harrison	USA	Evan King	35	8
MON	Hugo Nys	FRA	Édouard Roger-Vasselin	40	9
ARG	Máximo González	ARG	Andrés Molteni	42	10
CRO	Nikola Mektić	USA	Rajeev Ram	44	11
POR	Francisco Cabral	AUT	Lucas Miedler	54	12
NED	Sander Arends	GBR	Luke Johnson	55	13
IND	Yuki Bhambri	NZL	Michael Venus	57	14
FRA	Sadio Doumbia	FRA	Fabien Reboul	59	15
AUS	Matthew Ebden	AUS	Jordan Thompson	66	16

== Other entry information ==
=== Wildcards ===
- (United States) Tristan Boyer / (United States) Emilio Nava
- (United States) Maxwell Exsted / (United States) Cooper Woestendick
- (United States) George Goldhoff / (United States) Reese Stalder
- (United States) Trey Hilderbrand / (United States) Patrik Trhac
- (United States) Brandon Holt / (United States) Colton Smith
- (United States) Mackenzie McDonald / (United States) Ethan Quinn
- (United States) Cooper Williams / (United States) Theodore Winegar

=== Protected ranking ===
- (France) Nicolas Mahut / (France) Giovanni Mpetshi Perricard
- (France) Adrian Mannarino / (Finland) Emil Ruusuvuori

=== Alternates ===
- (Australia) Blake Bayldon / (Australia) Adam Walton
- (India) Anirudh Chandrasekar / (India) Vijay Sundar Prashanth
- (Poland) Karol Drzewiecki / (United Kingdom) Marcus Willis
- (Ecuador) Gonzalo Escobar / (Mexico) Miguel Ángel Reyes-Varela
- (Canada) Cleeve Harper / (Netherlands) Jean-Julien Rojer

=== Withdrawals ===
- (Germany) Daniel Altmaier / (Venezuela) Luis David Martínez → replaced by (India) Anirudh Chandrasekar / (India) Vijay Sundar Prashanth
- (Portugal) Nuno Borges / (France) Arthur Rinderknech → replaced by (Ecuador) Gonzalo Escobar / (Mexico) Miguel Ángel Reyes-Varela
- (Argentina) Francisco Cerúndolo / (Argentina) Federico Agustín Gómez → replaced by (Poland) Karol Drzewiecki / (United Kingdom) Marcus Willis
- (Italy) Luciano Darderi / (Australia) Tristan Schoolkate → replaced by (Canada) Cleeve Harper / (Netherlands) Jean-Julien Rojer
- (United Kingdom) Jacob Fearnley / (Poland) Kamil Majchrzak → replaced by (Australia) Blake Bayldon / (Australia) Adam Walton
