= 2023 Moselle Open – Doubles =

Doubles
- 2023 Moselle Open

Final
- Champions: (Monaco) Hugo Nys (Poland) Jan Zieliński
- Runners-up: (Germany) Constantin Frantzen (Germany) Hendrik Jebens
- Score: 6–4, 6–4

Events
| Singles | Doubles |
| ← 2022 · | Moselle Open | · 2024 → |

Defending champions Hugo Nys and Jan Zieliński defeated Constantin Frantzen and Hendrik Jebens 6–4, 6–4 in the final to win the doubles tennis title at the 2023 Moselle Open.

== Seeds ==
1. (Monaco) Hugo Nys / (Poland) Jan Zieliński (champions)
2. (Finland) Harri Heliövaara / (Germany) Andreas Mies (semifinals)
3. (United Kingdom) Lloyd Glasspool / (Australia) John Peers (quarterfinals)
4. (France) Sadio Doumbia / (France) Fabien Reboul (semifinals)

== Draw ==
=== Key ===
- Q = Qualifier
- WC = Wild card
- LL = Lucky loser
- Alt = Alternate
- SE = Special exempt
- PR = Protected ranking
- ITF = ITF entry
- JE = Junior exempt
- w/o = Walkover
- r = Retired
- d = Defaulted
- SR = Special ranking

=== Draw ===
First round
1 | (Monaco) H Nys (Poland) J Zieliński | 6 | 6^{4} | [10]
(Netherlands) S Arends (Mexico) MÁ Reyes-Varela | 3 | 7^{7} | [1]
WC | (Italy) F Fognini (France) P-H Herbert | 6 | 6
(Brazil) M Demoliner (Brazil) R Matos | 4 | 4
4 | (France) S Doumbia (France) F Reboul | 6 | 6
(Monaco) R Arneodo (Austria) S Weissborn | 4 | 3
(France) T Arribagé (France) L Sanchez | 3 | 4
(India) A Chandrasekar (Netherlands) B Stevens | 6 | 6
(Germany) C Frantzen (Germany) H Jebens | 6 | 7^{7}
(India) Y Bhambri (Romania) VV Cornea | 3 | 6^{4}
(United States) R Galloway (France) A Olivetti | 7^{7} | 6^{5} | [12]
3 | (United Kingdom) L Glasspool (Australia) J Peers | 6^{4} | 7^{7} | [14]
(France) D Added (France) J Eysseric | 4 | 6 | [4]
WC | (France) U Blanchet (France) M Martineau | 6 | 4 | [10]
(Kazakhstan) A Bublik; A Shevchenko | 3 | 3
2 | (Finland) H Heliövaara (Germany) A Mies | 6 | 6

Quarterfinals
1 | (Monaco) H Nys (Poland) J Zieliński | w/o
WC | (Italy) F Fognini (France) P-H Herbert
4 | (France) S Doumbia (France) F Reboul | 6 | 6
(India) A Chandrasekar (Netherlands) B Stevens | 2 | 4
(Germany) C Frantzen (Germany) H Jebens | 7^{7} | 6
3 | (United Kingdom) L Glasspool (Australia) J Peers | 6^{5} | 4
WC | (France) U Blanchet (France) M Martineau | 4 | 5
2 | (Finland) H Heliövaara (Germany) A Mies | 6 | 7

Semifinals
1 | (Monaco) H Nys (Poland) J Zieliński | 6^{6} | 6 | [10]
4 | (France) S Doumbia (France) F Reboul | 7^{8} | 2 | [2]
(Germany) C Frantzen (Germany) H Jebens | 7^{7} | 6^{7} | [10]
2 | (Finland) H Heliövaara (Germany) A Mies | 6^{3} | 7^{9} | [5]

Final
1 | (Monaco) H Nys (Poland) J Zieliński | 6 | 6
(Germany) C Frantzen (Germany) H Jebens | 4 | 4
