= 2023 Heilbronner Neckarcup – Doubles =

Doubles
- 2023 Heilbronner Neckarcup

Final
- Champions: (Germany) Constantin Frantzen (Germany) Hendrik Jebens
- Runners-up: (Romania) Victor Vlad Cornea (Austria) Philipp Oswald
- Score: 7–6^{(9–7)}, 6–4

Events
Singles	Doubles
- Heilbronner Neckarcup

Nicolás Barrientos and Miguel Ángel Reyes-Varela were the defending champions but chose to defend their title with different partners. Barrientos partnered Diego Hidalgo but lost in the quarterfinals to Victor Vlad Cornea and Philipp Oswald. Reyes-Varela partnered Jonathan Eysseric but lost in the quarterfinals to Andrey Golubev and Denys Molchanov.

Constantin Frantzen and Hendrik Jebens won the title after defeating Cornea and Oswald 7–6^{(9–7)}, 6–4 in the final.

== Seeds ==
1. (Monaco) Romain Arneodo / (Austria) Sam Weissborn (first round)
2. (India) Yuki Bhambri / (India) Saketh Myneni (first round)
3. (Romania) Victor Vlad Cornea / (Austria) Philipp Oswald (final)
4. (Kazakhstan) Andrey Golubev / (Ukraine) Denys Molchanov (semifinals)

== Draw ==
Key

- Q = Qualifier
- WC = Wild card
- LL = Lucky loser
- Alt = Alternate
- ITF = ITF entry
- PR = Protected ranking
- SR = Special ranking
- SE = Special exempt
- JE = Junior exempt
- JR = Junior Accelerator Programme entrant
- CO = College Accelerator Programme entrant
- NG = Next Gen Accelerator Program entrant
- w/o = Walkover
- r = Retired
- d = Defaulted

First round
1	(Monaco) R Arneodo (Austria) S Weissborn	6^{3}	6	[6]
(Germany) C Frantzen (Germany) H Jebens	7^{7}	3	[10]
(Bolivia) B Arias (Bolivia) F Zeballos	6	6
(Serbia) I Sabanov (Serbia) M Sabanov	2	4
4	(Kazakhstan) A Golubev (Ukraine) D Molchanov	7^{7}	6
(Bosnia and Herzegovina) D Džumhur; P Kotov	6^{4}	3
(Netherlands) S Arends (Netherlands) D Pel	3	2
(France) J Eysseric (Mexico) MÁ Reyes-Varela	6	6
(Colombia) N Barrientos (Ecuador) D Hidalgo	6	6
WC	(India) R Ramanathan (Serbia) N Zimonjić	1	3
(Jamaica) D Brown (Greece) Pe Tsitsipas	5	7^{7}	[8]
3	(Romania) VV Cornea (Austria) P Oswald	7	6^{4}	[10]
(Spain) P Martínez (Italy) A Pellegrino	6	6
(India) A Chandrasekar (India) VS Prashanth	2	4
WC	(Germany) R Molleker (Germany) H Squire	6	6
2	(India) Y Bhambri (India) S Myneni	1	3

Quarterfinals
(Germany) C Frantzen (Germany) H Jebens	7	6
(Bolivia) B Arias (Bolivia) F Zeballos	5	2
4	(Kazakhstan) A Golubev (Ukraine) D Molchanov	6	7^{7}
(France) J Eysseric (Mexico) MÁ Reyes-Varela	4	6^{4}
(Colombia) N Barrientos (Ecuador) D Hidalgo	6	6^{9}	[1]
3	(Romania) VV Cornea (Austria) P Oswald	1	7^{11}	[10]
(Spain) P Martínez (Italy) A Pellegrino	7^{7}	6
WC	(Germany) R Molleker (Germany) H Squire	6^{4}	2

Semifinals
(Germany) C Frantzen (Germany) H Jebens	6	7^{7}
4	(Kazakhstan) A Golubev (Ukraine) D Molchanov	4	6^{3}
3	(Romania) VV Cornea (Austria) P Oswald	6	6
(Spain) P Martínez (Italy) A Pellegrino	1	2

Final
(Germany) C Frantzen (Germany) H Jebens	7^{9}	6
3	(Romania) VV Cornea (Austria) P Oswald	6^{7}	4
