= 2023 Moselle Open – Singles =

Singles
- 2023 Moselle Open

Final
- Champion: (France) Ugo Humbert
- Runner-up: Alexander Shevchenko
- Score: 6–3, 6–3

Details
- Draw: 28 (4 Q / 3 WC )
- Seeds: 8

Events
Singles	Doubles
- Moselle Open

Ugo Humbert defeated Alexander Shevchenko in the final, 6–3, 6–3 to win the singles tennis title at the 2023 Moselle Open. It was his fourth career ATP Tour singles title.

Lorenzo Sonego was the defending champion, but lost in the quarterfinals to Fabio Fognini.

== Seeds ==
The top four seeds received a bye into the second round.

1. (Denmark) Holger Rune (withdrew)
2. (Australia) Alex de Minaur (withdrew)
3. Karen Khachanov (quarterfinals)
4. (France) Ugo Humbert (champion)
5. (Kazakhstan) Alexander Bublik (second round)
6. (Italy) Lorenzo Sonego (quarterfinals)
7. (Germany) Yannick Hanfmann (first round)
8. (Switzerland) Stan Wawrinka (second round, retired)
9. (Germany) Daniel Altmaier (first round)

== Draw ==
Key

- Q = Qualifier
- WC = Wild card
- LL = Lucky loser
- Alt = Alternate
- ITF = ITF entry
- PR = Protected ranking
- SR = Special ranking
- SE = Special exempt
- JE = Junior exempt
- JR = Junior Accelerator Programme entrant
- CO = College Accelerator Programme entrant
- NG = Next Gen Accelerator Program entrant
- w/o = Walkover
- r = Retired
- d = Defaulted

=== Finals ===
Semifinals
WC	(Italy) Fabio Fognini	0	2
4	(France) Ugo Humbert	6	6
Alexander Shevchenko	6	6
WC	(France) Pierre-Hugues Herbert	4	4

Final
4	(France) Ugo Humbert	6	6
Alexander Shevchenko	3	3

=== Top half ===
First round
(Brazil) T Seyboth Wild	6^{3}	6^{9}
WC	(Italy) F Fognini	7^{7}	7^{11}
Q	(Jordan) A Shelbayh	7^{7}	6
(France) H Gaston	6^{5}	2
(United States) M Giron	6	3	6^{3}
6	(Italy) L Sonego	2	6	7^{7}
LL	(France) M Martineau	4	2
(Austria) D Thiem	6	6
Q	(France) H Mayot	6	1	6
(Japan) Y Watanuki	4	6	4
(France) G Barrère	7^{7}	6
7	(Germany) Y Hanfmann	6^{5}	4

Second round
5	(Kazakhstan) A Bublik	6	6^{7}	6^{5}
WC	(Italy) F Fognini	4	7^{9}	7^{7}
Q	(Jordan) A Shelbayh	3	5
6	(Italy) L Sonego	6	7
4	(France) U Humbert	7^{7}	4	6
(Austria) D Thiem	6^{5}	6	3
Q	(France) H Mayot	7^{7}	2	7^{7}
(France) G Barrère	6^{2}	6	6^{5}

Quarterfinals
WC	(Italy) F Fognini	6	6
6	(Italy) L Sonego	1	2
4	(France) U Humbert	6	7
Q	(France) H Mayot	3	5

Semifinals
WC	(Italy) F Fognini	0	2
4	(France) U Humbert	6	6

=== Bottom half ===
First round
9	(Germany) D Altmaier	2	2
LL	(Hungary) M Valkusz	6	6
A Shevchenko	6	7
Q	(France) M Bourgue	4	5
(France) C Lestienne	6	6
Q	(France) C Hemery	3	2
8	(Switzerland) S Wawrinka	6	6
(Spain) B Zapata Miralles	0	2
(France) L Van Assche	3	6	7^{7}
(Netherlands) B van de Zandschulp	6	3	6^{5}
WC	(France) P-H Herbert	7^{9}	6
WC	(France) A Cazaux	6^{7}	4

Second round
LL	(Hungary) M Valkusz	5	6	2
A Shevchenko	7	2	6
(France) C Lestienne	4	4
3	K Khachanov	6	6
8	(Switzerland) S Wawrinka	6	6^{6}	0^{r}
(France) L Van Assche	3	7^{8}	0
WC	(France) P-H Herbert	7	6
LL	(Netherlands) G Brouwer	5	4

Quarterfinals
A Shevchenko	6	6
3	K Khachanov	4	4
(France) L Van Assche	6	3	5
WC	(France) P-H Herbert	4	6	7

Semifinals
A Shevchenko	6	6
WC	(France) P-H Herbert	4	4

== Qualifying ==
=== Seeds ===
1. (United Kingdom) Jan Choinski (first round)
2. (Netherlands) Gijs Brouwer (qualifying competition, lucky loser)
3. (France) Harold Mayot (qualified)
4. (France) Hugo Grenier (first round)
5. (France) Ugo Blanchet (first round)
6. (France) Calvin Hemery (qualified)
7. (France) Giovanni Mpetshi Perricard (withdrew)
8. (Jordan) Abdullah Shelbayh (qualified)

=== Qualifiers ===
1. (France) Mathias Bourgue
2. (Jordan) Abdullah Shelbayh
3. (France) Harold Mayot
4. (France) Calvin Hemery

=== Lucky losers ===
1. (France) Matteo Martineau
2. (Hungary) Máté Valkusz
3. (Netherlands) Gijs Brouwer

=== Qualifying draw ===
==== First qualifier ====
First round
1	(United Kingdom) Jan Choinski	6^{3}	7^{7}	2
(France) Mathias Bourgue	7^{7}	6^{5}	6
(France) Matteo Martineau	6	6
Alt	(Monaco) Hugo Nys	4	4

Qualifying competition
(France) Mathias Bourgue	6^{4}	6	7
(France) Matteo Martineau	7^{7}	4	5

==== Second qualifier ====
First round
2	(Netherlands) Gijs Brouwer	6	6
Alt	Mikalai Haliak	3	2
(France) Dan Added	4	3
8	(Jordan) Abdullah Shelbayh	6	6

Qualifying competition
2	(Netherlands) Gijs Brouwer	4	7^{7}	3
8	(Jordan) Abdullah Shelbayh	6	6^{5}	6

==== Third qualifier ====
First round
3	(France) Harold Mayot	6	3	6
Alt	(Germany) Peter Gojowczyk	3	6	3
WC	(France) Tom Paris	6	6
5	(France) Ugo Blanchet	4	1

Qualifying competition
3	(France) Harold Mayot	6	6
WC	(France) Tom Paris	3	4

==== Fourth qualifier ====
First round
4	(France) Hugo Grenier	6^{4}	2
(Hungary) Máté Valkusz	7^{7}	6
(Belgium) Michael Geerts	6^{7}	4
6/WC	(France) Calvin Hemery	7^{9}	6

Qualifying competition
(Hungary) Máté Valkusz	3	4
6/WC	(France) Calvin Hemery	6	6
