= Jeevan Nedunchezhiyan =

Indian tennis player (born 1988)

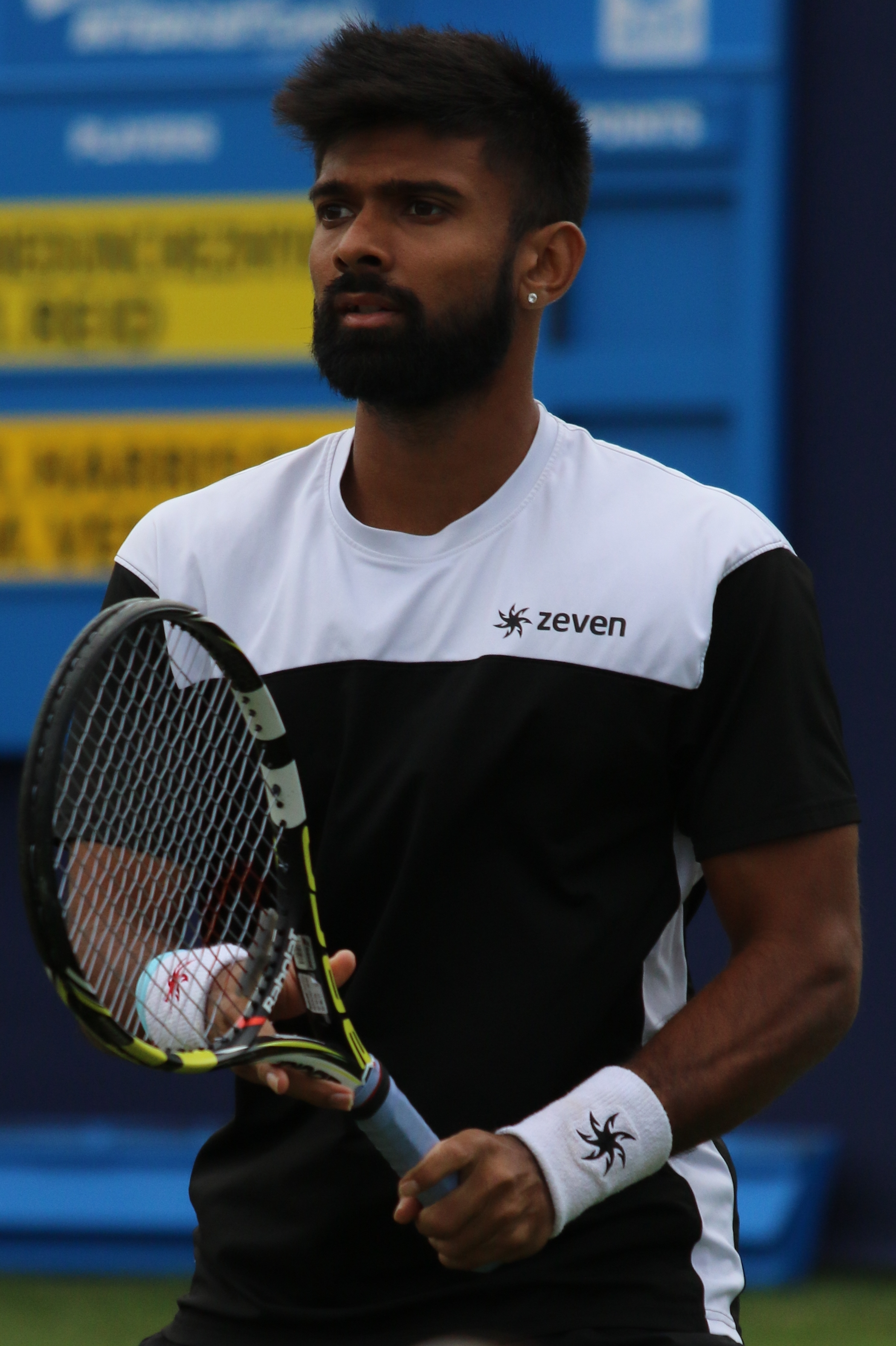
- Nedunchezhiyan at the 2017 Aegon International Eastbourne
- Country (sports): India
- Residence: Chennai, India
- Born: 20 October 1988 (age 38) Chennai, Tamil Nadu, India
- Height: 1.73 m (5 ft 8 in)
- Turned pro: 2011
- Plays: Left-handed (two-handed backhand)
- College: Washington
- Prize money: $501,559

Singles
- Career record: 0–1
- Career titles: 0
- Highest ranking: No. 293 (25 August 2014)

Doubles
- Career record: 35–49
- Career titles: 2
- Highest ranking: No. 64 (18 March 2019)
- Current ranking: No. 97 (6 January 2025)

Grand Slam doubles results
- Australian Open: 2R (2023)
- French Open: 1R (2019, 2023)
- Wimbledon: 1R (2017, 2018, 2019, 2023)
- US Open: 1R (2018)
Medal record
Representing India
Men's tennis
South Asian Games
Silver medal – second place	2019 Kathmandu/Pokhara	Men's Doubles
Silver medal – second place	2019 Kathmandu/Pokhara	Mixed Doubles
- Last updated on: 6 January 2025.

Jeevan Nedunchezhiyan (born 20 October 1988) is an Indian professional tennis player. He has a career-high ATP doubles ranking of No. 64 achieved on 18 March 2019. He won the doubles title with Rohan Bopanna at the 2017 Chennai Open, in a historic final featuring four Indian players.

== Personal life ==
He is the grandson of veteran political leader V. R. Nedunchezhiyan, who was acting chief minister of Tamil Nadu in two tenures. Maternally he is the grandson of Col.Dr. M. D. K. Kuthalingam, who was a former vice chancellor of Madurai Kamaraj University, and has also been Jeevan's mentor.

Jeevan also found the love of his life in 2024 when he married Vishnupriya Chiteri Meyyappan.

== Professional career ==
=== 2011: Turned pro ===
Nedunchezhiyan turned pro in year 2011.

=== 2017: First ATP doubles title ===
Nedunchezhiyan won his first ATP World Tour level title at the 2017 Aircel Chennai Open. He won the title with partner Rohan Bopanna by defeating a pair of compatriots, Purav Raja and Divij Sharan, in an all Indian final. As a result, he broke into the top 100 at world No. 86 on 9 January 2017.

=== 2023: First Major win at Australian Open, Third ATP final ===
He reached his third ATP final at the 2023 Tata Open Maharashtra with compatriot N.Sriram Balaji as an alternate pair. They defeated compatriots Purav Raja and Divij Sharan in straight sets in first round. In the quarterfinals, they upset second seeds Nathaniel Lammons and Jackson Withrow in straight sets winning both sets in a tiebreak. Next they defeated British pair of Jack Cash and Henry Patten in the semifinals in straight sets to reach their first ATP Tour final as a team. Despite not losing a single set on their way to final they were defeated in straight sets by Sander Gillé and Joran Vliegen in the final. He won his first Grand Slam doubles match at the 2023 Australian Open with Balaji defeating fifth seeds Ivan Dodig and Austin Krajicek as an alternate pair. He entered the main draw of the 2023 French Open also as an alternate pair with Balaji.

=== 2024: Hangzhou Open title ===
Partnering with Vijay Sundar Prashanth, Nedunchezhiyan won the doubles title at the 2024 Hangzhou Open, defeating Constantin Frantzen and Hendrik Jebens in the final.

== ATP Tour finals ==
=== Doubles: 4 (2 titles, 2 runner-ups) ===
Legend Grand Slam tournaments (0–0) ATP World Tour Finals (0–0) ATP World Tour Masters 1000 (0–0) ATP World Tour 500 Series (0–0) ATP World Tour 250 Series (2–2)	Titles by surface Hard (2–2) Clay (0–0) Grass (0–0)	Titles by setting Outdoor (2–2) Indoor (0–0)

Result	W–L	Date	Tournament	Tier	Surface	Partner	Opponents	Score
Win	1–0	Jan 2017	Chennai Open, India	250 Series	Hard	(India) Rohan Bopanna	(India) Purav Raja (India) Divij Sharan	6–3, 6–4
Loss	1–1	Sep 2018	Chengdu Open, China	250 Series	Hard	(United States) Austin Krajicek	(Croatia) Ivan Dodig (Croatia) Mate Pavić	2–6, 4–6
Loss	1–2	Jan 2023	Maharashtra Open, India	250 Series	Hard	(India) Sriram Balaji	(Belgium) Sander Gillé (Belgium) Joran Vliegen	4–6, 4–6
Win	2–2	Sep 2024	Hangzhou Open, China	ATP 250	Hard	(India) Vijay Sundar Prashanth	(Germany) Hendrik Jebens (Germany) Constantin Frantzen	4–6, 7–6^{(7–5)}, [10–7]

== ATP Challenger and ITF Tour Finals ==
=== Singles: 14 (7–7) ===
Legend (singles) ATP Challenger Tour (0–0) ITF Futures Tour (7–7)	Titles by surface Hard (5–5) Clay (2–2) Grass (0–0) Carpet (0–0)

Result	W–L	Date	Tournament	Tier	Surface	Opponent	Score
Loss	0–1	Jul 2007	India F6, Chennai	Futures	Clay	(India) Vijay Kannan	6–0, 3–6, 5–7
Win	1–1	Nov 2011	India F10, Pune	Futures	Hard	(India) Vishnu Vardhan	6–4, 7–5
Win	2–1	Dec 2011	India F12, Kolkata	Futures	Clay	(India) Sriram Balaji	6–2, 6–1
Win	3–1	Apr 2012	India F5, Madurai	Futures	Clay	(Spain) Marc Giner	4–6, 6–1, 7–6^{(7–4)}
Win	4–1	Oct 2012	India F13, Mumbai	Futures	Hard	(Croatia) Mate Pavić	6–1, 6–1
Loss	4–2	Mar 2013	India F1, Chennai	Futures	Clay	(Romania) Victor Crivoi	6–7^{(3–7)}, 5–7
Loss	4–3	Jun 2013	India F7, Chennai	Futures	Hard	(India) Sriram Balaji	7–6^{(8–6)}, 4–6, 0–6
Win	5–3	Jun 2013	India F8, Coimbatore	Futures	Hard	(India) Vijayant Malik	6–2, 5–1 ret.
Loss	5–4	Aug 2013	Gabon F1, Libreville	Futures	Hard	(Republic of Ireland) James McGee	6–1, 6–4
Loss	5–5	Aug 2013	Gabon F2, Libreville	Futures	Hard	(France) Arthur Surreaux	6–4, 4–6, 5–7
Loss	5–6	Oct 2013	Nigeria F2, Lagos	Futures	Hard	(Croatia) Ante Pavić	4–6, 3–6
Loss	5–7	Jun 2014	Guam F1, Tumon	Futures	Hard	(Japan) Takuto Niki	7–6^{(8–6)}, 2–6, 5–7
Win	6–7	Mar 2015	India F2, Bhimavaram	Futures	Hard	(Spain) David Pérez Sanz	7–6^{(9–7)}, 6–1
Win	7–7	Sep 2015	India F12, Chennai	Futures	Hard	(India) Prajnesh Gunneswaran	7–6^{(10–8)}, 6–4

=== Doubles: 63 (35–28) ===
Legend (doubles) ATP Challenger Tour (13–22) ITF Futures Tour (22–6)	Titles by surface Hard (23–18) Clay (11–8) Grass (1–1) Carpet (0–1)

Result	W–L	Date	Tournament	Tier	Surface	Partner	Opponents	Score
Win	1–0	Jul 2007	India F6, Chennai	Futures	Clay	(India) Vivek Shokeen	(India) Sriram Balaji (India) Vijay Sundar Prashanth	7–5, 6–4
Loss	1–1	Dec 2011	India F12, Kolkata	Futures	Clay	(India) Vijay Sundar Prashanth	(India) Sriram Balaji (India) Vinayak Sharma Kaza	3–6, 6–4, [3–10]
Win	2–1	Apr 2012	India F4, Trichy	Futures	Clay	(India) Vijay Sundar Prashanth	(India) Rupesh Roy (India) Vivek Shokeen	7–6^{(7–3)}, 6–7^{(5–7)}, [10–7]
Win	3–1	Jun 2012	India F9, Bangalore	Futures	Hard	(India) Ranjeet Virali-Murugesan	(India) Sriram Balaji (India) Arun-Prakash Rajagopalan	4–6, 6–3, [10–7]
Loss	3–2	Dec 2012	Cambodia F2, Phnom Penh	Futures	Hard	(China) Gao Wan	(New Zealand) Marcus Daniell (United Kingdom) Richard Gabb	1–6, 6–7^{(5–7)}
Win	4–2	Dec 2012	India F15, Davanagere	Futures	Hard	(India) Sriram Balaji	(India) Vijay Sundar Prashanth (India) Arun-Prakash Rajagopalan	6–7^{(4–7)}, 6–4, [10–1]
Loss	4–3	Mar 2013	India F1, Chennai	Futures	Clay	(India) Sriram Balaji	(Japan) Arata Onozawa (India) Arun-Prakash Rajagopalan	4–6, 6–0, [7–10]
Win	5–3	Jun 2013	India F6, Chennai	Futures	Hard	(India) Sriram Balaji	(Japan) Toshihide Matsui (Japan) Bumpei Sato	6–1, 6–4
Win	6–3	Jun 2013	India F7, Chennai	Futures	Hard	(India) Sriram Balaji	(South Africa) Keith-Patrick Crowley (India) Arun-Prakash Rajagopalan	6–2, 6–7^{(6–8)}, [10–5]
Win	7–3	Aug 2013	Gabon F1, Libreville	Futures	Hard	(India) Vishnu Vardhan	(Republic of Ireland) Sam Barry (France) Elie Rousset	6–2, 6–7^{(6–8)}, [10–5]
Loss	7–4	Aug 2013	Gabon F2, Libreville	Futures	Hard	(India) Vishnu Vardhan	(Republic of Ireland) Sam Barry (France) Elie Rousset	0–6, 0–6
Win	8–4	Sep 2013	Burundi F1, Bujumbura	Futures	Clay	(Belgium) Yannick Mertens	(Zimbabwe) Mark Fynn (Burundi) Hassan Ndayishimiye	6–3, 6–2
Win	9–4	Nov 2013	India F10, Bhopal	Futures	Hard	(India) Purav Raja	(Kyrgyzstan) Daniiar Duldaev (India) Karunuday Singh	6–3, 6–3
Win	10–4	Mar 2014	India F3, Chennai	Futures	Clay	(India) Vishnu Vardhan	(India) Sriram Balaji (India) Ranjeet Virali-Murugesan	7–6^{(7–1)}, 6–3
Win	11–4	Aug 2014	Gabon F1, Libreville	Futures	Hard	(Republic of Ireland) Sam Barry	(Zimbabwe) Mark Fynn (South Africa) Ruan Roelofse	6–2, 6–2
Win	12–4	Aug 2014	Gabon F2, Libreville	Futures	Hard	(Republic of Ireland) Sam Barry	(Zimbabwe) Mark Fynn (South Africa) Ruan Roelofse	7–6^{(7–5)}, 6–3
Win	13–4	Oct 2014	Kazakhstan F12, Shymkent	Futures	Clay	(Spain) Enrique López Pérez	(Ukraine) Yurii Dzhavakian (Ukraine) Olexiy Kolisnyk	7–5, 6–0
Win	14–4	Oct 2014	Kazakhstan F13, Shymkent	Futures	Clay	(Spain) Enrique López Pérez	(Bulgaria) Aleksandar Lazov (Georgia (country)) Aleksandre Metreveli	6–3, 6–3
Win	15–4	Nov 2014	India F7, Raipur	Futures	Hard	(India) Vishnu Vardhan	(India) Vinayak Sharma Kaza (India) Vijay Sundar Prashanth	2–6, 6–3, [10–6]
Win	1–0	Feb 2015	Kolkata, India	Challenger	Hard	(India) Somdev Devvarman	(Australia) James Duckworth (Australia) Luke Saville	w/o
Win	16–4	Mar 2015	India F1, Chandigarh	Futures	Hard	(India) Vijay Sundar Prashanth	(Spain) Enrique López Pérez (Spain) David Pérez Sanz	6–3, 6–4
Loss	16–5	Apr 2015	Indonesia F3, Jakarta	Futures	Hard	(Thailand) Danai Udomchoke	(Japan) Toshihide Matsui (Indonesia) Christopher Rungkat	4–6, 2–6
Loss	16–6	May 2015	Nigeria F1, Abuja	Futures	Hard	(Croatia) Matija Pecotić	(United States) Deiton Baughman (United States) Eric Quigley	1–6, 4–6
Win	17–6	May 2015	Nigeria F2, Abuja	Futures	Hard	(Croatia) Matija Pecotić	(South Africa) Keith-Patrick Crowley (South Africa) Tucker Vorster	6–4, 3–6, [10–4]
Win	18–6	May 2015	Guam F1, Tumon	Futures	Hard	(Japan) Yuichi Ito	(Japan) Masakatsu Noguchi (Japan) Masaki Sasai	2–6, 6–3, [10–7]
Win	19–6	Aug 2015	India F11, Chennai	Futures	Hard	(India) Vijay Sundar Prashanth	(India) Mohit Mayur Jayaprakash (India) Vinayak Sharma Kaza	6–4, 7–6^{(7–5)}
Win	20–6	Sep 2015	India F12, Chennai	Futures	Hard	(India) Vijay Sundar Prashanth	(Russia) Markos Kalovelonis (Kazakhstan) Timur Khabibulin	4–6, 6–3, [10–4]
Loss	1–1	Mar 2016	Shenzhen, China	Challenger	Hard	(India) Saketh Myneni	(Australia) Luke Saville (Australia) Jordan Thompson	6–3, 4–6, [10–12]
Win	2–1	Apr 2016	Nanjing, China	Challenger	Clay	(India) Saketh Myneni	(Ukraine) Denys Molchanov (Kazakhstan) Aleksandr Nedovyesov	6–3, 6–3
Win	3–1	May 2016	Karshi, Uzbekistan	Challenger	Hard	(Spain) Enrique López Pérez	(Georgia (country)) Aleksandre Metreveli (Kazakhstan) Dmitry Popko	6–1, 6–4
Loss	3–2	Oct 2016	Ho Chi Minh City, Vietnam	Challenger	Hard	(India) Ramkumar Ramanathan	(Thailand) Sanchai Ratiwatana (Thailand) Sonchat Ratiwatana	5–7, 4–6
Loss	3–3	Nov 2016	Kobe, Japan	Challenger	Hard (i)	(Indonesia) Christopher Rungkat	(Germany) Daniel Masur (Croatia) Ante Pavić	6–4, 3–6, [6–10]
Loss	3–4	Nov 2016	Toyota, Japan	Challenger	Carpet (i)	(Indonesia) Christopher Rungkat	(Australia) Matt Reid (Australia) John-Patrick Smith	3–6, 4–6
Loss	3–5	Feb 2017	Dallas, USA	Challenger	Hard (i)	(Indonesia) Christopher Rungkat	(Republic of Ireland) David O'Hare (United Kingdom) Joe Salisbury	7–6^{(8–6)}, 3–6, [9–11]
Win	4–5	May 2017	Ostrava, Czech Republic	Challenger	Clay	(Croatia) Franko Škugor	(Australia) Rameez Junaid (Czech Republic) Lukáš Rosol	6–3, 6–2
Loss	4–6	Oct 2017	Ningbo, China	Challenger	Hard	(Indonesia) Christopher Rungkat	(Moldova) Radu Albot (New Zealand) Jose Statham	5–7, 3–6
Loss	4–7	Nov 2017	Kobe, Japan	Challenger	Hard (i)	(Indonesia) Christopher Rungkat	(Japan) Ben McLachlan (Japan) Yasutaka Uchiyama	6–4, 3–6, [8–10]
Win	5–7	Feb 2018	Dallas, USA	Challenger	Hard (i)	(Indonesia) Christopher Rungkat	(India) Leander Paes (United Kingdom) Joe Salisbury	6–4, 3–6, [10–7]
Loss	5–8	Mar 2018	Lille, France	Challenger	Hard	(India) Purav Raja	(France) Hugo Nys (Germany) Tim Pütz	6–7^{(3–7)}, 6–1, [7–10]
Loss	5–9	Apr 2018	Tallahassee, USA	Challenger	Clay	(Spain) Enrique López Pérez	(United States) Robert Galloway (United States) Denis Kudla	3–6, 1–6
Loss	5–10	May 2018	Savannah, USA	Challenger	Clay	(Spain) Enrique López Pérez	(United Kingdom) Luke Bambridge (Australia) Akira Santillan	2–6, 2–6
Loss	5–11	Jun 2018	Nottingham, Great Britain	Challenger	Grass	(United States) Austin Krajicek	(Denmark) Frederik Nielsen (United Kingdom) Joe Salisbury	6–7^{(5–7)}, 1–6
Win	6–11	Jun 2018	Ilkley, Great Britain	Challenger	Grass	(United States) Austin Krajicek	(Germany) Kevin Krawietz (Germany) Andreas Mies	6–3, 6–3
Win	7–11	Jul 2018	Winnetka, USA	Challenger	Hard	(United States) Austin Krajicek	(Venezuela) Roberto Maytín (Indonesia) Christopher Rungkat	6–7^{(4–7)}, 6–4, [10–5]
Win	8–11	Oct 2018	Monterrey, Mexico	Challenger	Hard	(El Salvador) Marcelo Arévalo	(India) Leander Paes (Mexico) Miguel Ángel Reyes-Varela	6–1, 6–4
Loss	8–12	Nov 2018	Shenzhen, China	Challenger	Hard	(India) Sriram Balaji	(Chinese Taipei) Hsieh Cheng-peng (Indonesia) Christopher Rungkat	4–6, 2–6
Win	9–12	Oct 2021	Lisbon, Portugal	Challenger	Clay	(India) Purav Raja	(Portugal) Nuno Borges (Portugal) Francisco Cabral	7–6^{(7–5)}, 6–3
Loss	9–13	Nov 2021	Tenerife, Spain	Challenger	Hard	(India) Purav Raja	(Portugal) Nuno Borges (Portugal) Francisco Cabral	3–6, 4–6
Win	10–13	Jun 2022	Bratislava, Slovakia	Challenger	Clay	(India) Sriram Balaji	(Ukraine) Vladyslav Manafov (Ukraine) Oleg Prihodko	7–6^{(8–6)}, 6–4
Win	11–13	Jun 2022	Blois, France	Challenger	Clay	(India) Sriram Balaji	(Monaco) Romain Arneodo (France) Jonathan Eysseric	6–4, 6–7^{(3–7)}, [10–7]
Loss	11–14	Sep 2022	Braga, Portugal	Challenger	Clay	(Indonesia) Christopher Rungkat	(Czech Republic) Vít Kopřiva (Czech Republic) Jaroslav Pospíšil	6–3, 3–6, [4–10]
Loss	11–15	Nov 2022	Temuco, Chile	Challenger	Hard	(Venezuela) Luis David Martínez	(Argentina) Guido Andreozzi (Argentina) Guillermo Durán	4–6, 2–6
Loss	11–16	May 2023	Skopje, North Macedonia	Challenger	Clay	(India) Sriram Balaji	(Czech Republic) Petr Nouza (Czech Republic) Andrew Paulson	6–7^{(5–7)}, 3–6
Loss	11–17	Oct 2023	Alicante, Spain	Challenger	Hard	(Australia) John-Patrick Smith	(India) Niki Kaliyanda Poonacha (India) Divij Sharan	4–6, 6–3, [7–10]
Loss	11–18	Nov 2023	Helsinki, Finland	Challenger	Hard	(India) Vijay Sundar Prashanth	(India) Sriram Balaji (Germany) Andre Begemann	2–6, 5–7
Loss	11–19	Nov 2023	Danderyd, Sweden	Challenger	Hard	(India) Vijay Sundar Prashanth	(United Kingdom) Julian Cash (Netherlands) Bart Stevens	7–6^{(9–7)}, 4–6, [7–10]
Loss	11–20	Mar 2024	Murcia, Spain	Challenger	Clay	(India) Arjun Kadhe	(France) Théo Arribagé (Romania) Victor Vlad Cornea	5–7, 1–6
Win	12–20	Apr 2024	Cuernavaca, Mexico	Challenger	Hard	(India) Arjun Kadhe	(Poland) Piotr Matuszewski (Australia) Matthew Romios	7–6^{(7–5)}, 6–4
Loss	12–21	Aug 2024	Bonn, Germany	Challenger	Clay	(India) Vijay Sundar Prashanth	(France) Théo Arribagé (Brazil) Orlando Luz	2–6, 4–6
Win	13–21	Feb 2025	Pune, India	Challenger	Hard	(India) Vijay Sundar Prashanth	(Australia) Blake Bayldon (Australia) Matthew Romios	3–6, 6–3, [10–0]
Win	21–6	Jan 2026	M25 Chennai, India	World Tennis Tour	Hard	(India) Ramkumar Ramanathan	(India) S D Prajwal Dev (India) Nitin Kumar Sinha	4–6, 6–3, [10–8]
Win	22–6	Mar 2026	M25 Mumbai, India	World Tennis Tour	Hard	(India) Ramkumar Ramanathan	(Sweden) Leo Borg (Ukraine) Yurii Dzhavakian	6–3, 6–4
Loss	13–22	Nov 2026	Monastir, Tunisia	Challenger	Hard	(United Kingdom) James MacKinlay	(Czech Republic) Filip Duda (Portugal) Tiago Pereira	6–7^{(1–7)}, 6–7^{(2–7)}
