= Hendrik Jebens =

German tennis player (born 1995)

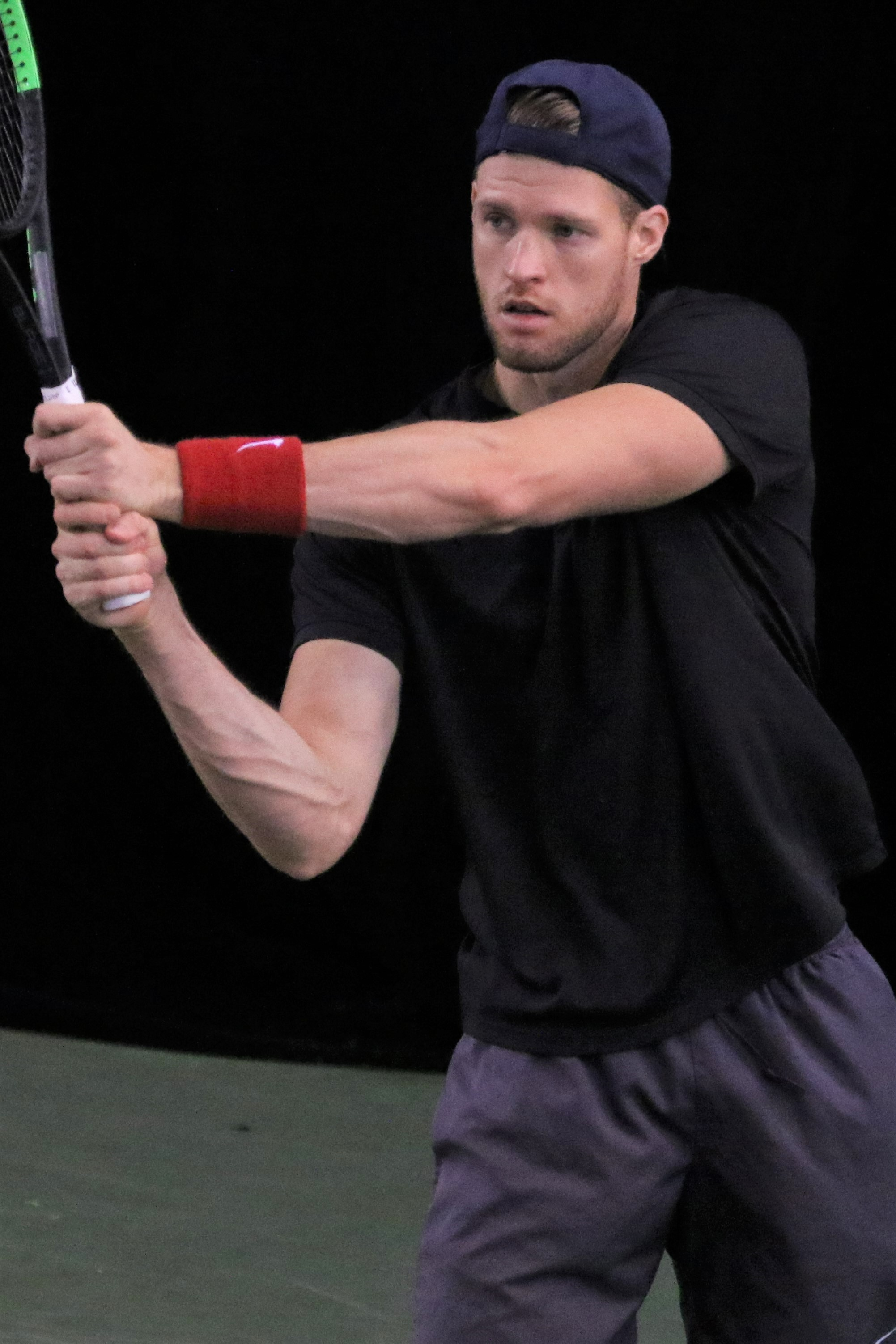
- Jebens at the 2022 Internationaux de Tennis de Vendée
- Country (sports): Germany
- Born: 8 August 1995 (age 31) Stuttgart, Germany
- Height: 1.96 m (6 ft 5 in)
- Plays: Right-handed (two-handed backhand)
- College: San Diego State
- Prize money: US $545,086

Singles
- Career record: 0–0
- Career titles: 0
- Highest ranking: No. 1035 (11 November 2019)

Doubles
- Career record: 39–51
- Career titles: 0
- Highest ranking: No. 45 (5 August 2024)
- Current ranking: No. 67 (25 May 2026)

Grand Slam doubles results
- Australian Open: 2R (2026)
- French Open: 2R (2026)
- Wimbledon: QF (2024)
- US Open: 2R (2025)
- Last updated on: 27 May 2026.

Hendrik Jebens (born 8 August 1995) is a German professional tennis player who specializes in doubles. He has a career-high ATP doubles ranking of world No. 45, achieved on 5 August 2024. He has won nine ATP Challenger doubles titles, seven of them with compatriot Constantin Frantzen.

== Career ==
=== 2022 ===
Jebens lost the doubles first round qualifying match of the ATP 500 event Swiss Indoors with partner Fabian Fallert in three sets against Nathaniel Lammons and Jackson Withrow.

=== 2023–2024: ATP and Grand Slam debuts, three ATP finals ===
Jebens won two ATP Challenger doubles titles in the first quarter of 2023, in Koblenz with Fabian Fallert, and in Biel/Bienne with Constantin Frantzen. He made his ATP Tour doubles main draw debut at the 2023 Grand Prix Hassan II in Marrakesh, partnering Petros Tsitsipas.

He reached his first ATP Tour final at the 2024 Moselle Open alongside Frantzen, but lost to Hugo Nys and Jan Zieliński. Jebens reached his second ATP Tour final at the 2024 Generali Open Kitzbühel, also alongside Frantzen, but lost to Alexander Erler and Andreas Mies. The pair also made it to the 2024 Hangzhou Open final, losing to Jeevan Nedunchezhiyan and Vijay Sundar Prashanth in the final.

== Doubles performance timeline ==
Key
W	F	SF	QF	#R	RR	Q#	DNQ	A	NH

(W) winner; (F) finalist; (SF) semifinalist; (QF) quarterfinalist; (#R) rounds 4, 3, 2, 1; (RR) round-robin stage; (Q#) qualification round; (DNQ) did not qualify; (A) absent; (NH) not held; (SR) strike rate (events won / competed); (W–L) win–loss record.
To avoid confusion and double counting, these charts are updated at the conclusion of a tournament or when the player's participation has ended.

Current through the 2026 Stockholm Open.

Tournament	2023	2024	2025	2026	SR	W–L
Grand Slam tournaments
Australian Open	A	1R	1R	2R	0 / 3	1–3
French Open	A	1R	1R	2R	0 / 3	1–3
Wimbledon	A	QF	2R	3R	0 / 3	6–3
US Open	A	1R	2R	1R	0 / 3	1–3
Win–loss	0–0	3–4	2–4	4–4	0 / 12	9–12
ATP 1000 tournaments
Miami Open	A	A	1R	A	0 / 1	0–1
Madrid Open	A	A	1R	A	0 / 1	0–1
Win–loss	0–0	0–0	0–2	0–0	0 / 2	0–2
Career statistics
Tournaments	6	20	17	18	61	
Titles	0	0	0	0	0	
Finals	1	2	1	1	5	
Overall win–loss	3–6	19–20	11–17	12–18	45–61	
Year-end ranking	63	52	76		42%	

== ATP Tour finals ==
=== Doubles: 5 (5 runner-ups) ===
Legend Grand Slam (–) ATP 1000 (–) ATP 500 (0–1) ATP 250 (0–4)	Finals by surface Hard (0–3) Clay (0–2) Grass (–)	Finals by setting Outdoor (0–3) Indoor (0–2)

Result	W–L	Date	Tournament	Tier	Surface	Partner	Opponents	Score
Loss	0–1	Nov 2023	Moselle Open, France	ATP 250	Hard (i)	(Germany) Constantin Frantzen	(Monaco) Hugo Nys (Poland) Jan Zieliński	4–6, 4–6
Loss	0–2	Jul 2024	Austrian Open Kitzbühel, Austria	ATP 250	Clay	(Germany) Constantin Frantzen	(Austria) Alexander Erler (Germany) Andreas Mies	3–6, 6–3, [6–10]
Loss	0–3	Sep 2024	Hangzhou Open, China	ATP 250	Hard	(Germany) Constantin Frantzen	(India) Jeevan Nedunchezhiyan (India) Vijay Sundar Prashanth	6–4, 6–7^{(5–7)}, [7–10]
Loss	0–4	Jul 2025	Swiss Open Gstaad, Switzerland	ATP 250	Clay	(France) Albano Olivetti	(Portugal) Francisco Cabral (Austria) Lucas Miedler	7–6^{(7–4)}, 6–7^{(4–7)}, [3–10]
Loss	0–5	Feb 2026	Rotterdam Open, Netherlands	ATP 500	Hard (i)	(Chinese Taipei) Ray Ho	(Italy) Simone Bolelli (Italy) Andrea Vavassori	3–6, 4–6

== ATP Challenger finals ==
=== Doubles: 23 (10 titles, 13 runner-ups) ===
Legend ATP Challenger (10–13)	Finals by surface Hard (4–5) Clay (6–6) Carpet (0–2)

Result	W–L	Date	Tournament	Surface	Partner	Opponents	Score
Loss	0–1	Feb 2022	Cherbourg, France	Hard (i)	(Germany) Niklas Schell	(France) Jonathan Eysseric (France) Quentin Halys	6–7^{(6–8)}, 2–6
Loss	0–2	May 2022	Troisdorf, Germany	Clay	(Poland) Piotr Matuszewski	(Jamaica) Dustin Brown (United States) Evan King	4–6, 5–7
Loss	0–3	Jul 2022	Lüdenscheid, Germany	Clay	(Germany) Fabian Fallert	(Netherlands) Robin Haase (Netherlands) Sem Verbeek	2–6, 7–5, [3–10]
Loss	0–4	Aug 2022	Banja Luka, Bosnia	Clay	(Germany) Fabian Fallert	(Ukraine) Vladyslav Manafov (Ukraine) Oleg Prihodko	3–6, 4–6
Loss	0–5	Oct 2022	Ismaning, Germany	Carpet (i)	(Germany) Fabian Fallert	(Belgium) Michael Geerts (Finland) Patrik Niklas-Salminen	6–7^{(5–7)}, 6–7^{(8–10)}
Win	1–5	Feb 2023	Koblenz, Germany	Hard (i)	(Germany) Fabian Fallert	(France) Jonathan Eysseric (Ukraine) Denys Molchanov	7–6^{(7–2)}, 6–3
Loss	1–6	Mar 2023	Lugano, Switzerland	Hard (i)	(Germany) Constantin Frantzen	(Belgium) Zizou Bergs (Netherlands) David Pel	2–6, 6–7^{(6–8)}
Win	2–6	Mar 2023	Biel/Bienne, Switzerland	Hard (i)	(Germany) Constantin Frantzen	(Romania) Victor Vlad Cornea (Croatia) Franko Škugor	6–2, 6–4
Loss	2–7	May 2023	Mauthausen, Austria	Clay	(Germany) Constantin Frantzen	(Monaco) Romain Arneodo (Austria) Sam Weissborn	4–6, 2–6
Win	3–7	Jun 2023	Heilbronn, Germany	Clay	(Germany) Constantin Frantzen	(Romania) Victor Vlad Cornea (Austria) Philipp Oswald	7–6^{(9–7)}, 6–4
Loss	3–8	Jun 2023	Lyon, France	Clay	(Germany) Constantin Frantzen	(France) Manuel Guinard (France) Grégoire Jacq	4–6, 6–2, [7–10]
Win	4–8	Aug 2023	Augsburg, Germany	Clay	(Germany) Constantin Frantzen	(France) Constantin Kouzmine (Ukraine) Volodymyr Uzhylovskyi	6–2, 6–2
Win	5–8	Sep 2023	Como, Italy	Clay	(Germany) Constantin Frantzen	(Sweden) Filip Bergevi (Netherlands) Mick Veldheer	6–3, 6–4
Win	6–8	Sep 2023	Bad Waltersdorf, Austria	Clay	(Germany) Constantin Frantzen	(Italy) Marco Bortolotti (Italy) Francesco Passaro	6–1, 6–2
Win	7–8	Oct 2023	Orléans, France	Hard (i)	(Germany) Constantin Frantzen	(United Kingdom) Henry Patten (Australia) John-Patrick Smith	7–6^{(7–5)}, 7–6^{(14–12)}
Loss	7–9	Nov 2023	Ismaning, Germany	Carpet (i)	(Germany) Constantin Frantzen	(India) Sriram Balaji (Germany) Andre Begemann	6–7^{(4–7)}, 4–6
Loss	7–10	Mar 2024	Lugano, Switzerland	Hard (i)	(Germany) Constantin Frantzen	(Netherlands) Sander Arends (Netherlands) Sem Verbeek	7–6^{(11–9)}, 6–7^{(1–7)}, [8–10]
Win	8–10	May 2024	Mauthausen, Austria	Clay	(Germany) Constantin Frantzen	(United States) Ryan Seggerman (United States) Patrik Trhac	6–4, 6–4
Loss	8–11	May 2025	Turin, Italy	Clay	(Netherlands) Robin Haase	(Uruguay) Ariel Behar (Belgium) Joran Vliegen	2–6, 4–6
Win	9–11	Aug 2025	Hagen, Germany	Clay	(France) Albano Olivetti	(United States) Vasil Kirkov (Netherlands) Bart Stevens	6–4, 6–7^{(2–7)}, [10–8]
Loss	9–12	Sep 2025	Rennes, France	Hard (i)	(France) Albano Olivetti	(Finland) Patrik Niklas-Salminen (Czech Republic) Matěj Vocel	3–6, 3–6
Loss	9–13	Nov 2025	Lyon, France	Hard (i)	(India) Sriram Balaji	(Ecuador) Diego Hidalgo (United States) Patrik Trhac	3–6, 4–6
Win	10–13	Oct 2026	Roanne, France	Hard (i)	(Monaco) Romain Arneodo	(United Kingdom) David Stevenson (United Kingdom) Marcus Willis	6–4, 6–4

== ITF World Tennis Tour finals ==
=== Doubles: 7 (3 titles, 4 runner-ups) ===
Legend ITF WTT (3–4)	Finals by surface Hard (2–3) Clay (1–0) Carpet (0–1)

Result	W–L	Date	Tournament	Surface	Partner	Opponents	Score
Loss	0–1	Jun 2019	M25 Martos, Spain	Hard	(Germany) Fabian Fallert	(Spain) Jaume Pla Malfeito (Colombia) Eduardo Struvay	6–4, 3–6, [7–10]
Loss	0–2	Jul 2019	M25 Ajaccio, France	Hard	(Germany) Fabian Fallert	(France) Yanais Laurent (Brazil) Thiago Seyboth Wild	4–6, 6–1, [8–10]
Win	1–2	Oct 2019	M25 Claremont, US	Hard	(Germany) Milen Ianakiev	(Philippines) Ruben Gonzales (South Africa) Ruan Roelofse	6–4, 3–6, [17–15]
Loss	1–3	Feb 2020	M15 Grenoble, France	Hard (i)	(Germany) Fabian Fallert	(Russia) Artem Dubrivnyy (Czech Republic) Andrew Paulson	6–7^{(4–7)}, 6–3, [7–10]
Win	2–3	Aug 2021	M25 Überlingen, Germany	Clay	(Germany) Niklas Schell	(Germany) Fabian Fallert (Germany) Tim Handel	6–4, 7–5
Win	3–3	Sep 2021	M25 Plaisir, France	Hard	(Germany) Niklas Schell	(Sweden) Filip Bergevi (France) Arthur Reymond	6–2, 7–6^{(7–0)}
Loss	3–4	Oct 2021	M25 Sarreguemines, France	Carpet (i)	(France) Constantin Kouzmine	(Australia) Blake Ellis (Australia) Tristan Schoolkate	6–7^{(1–7)}, 6–3, [5–10]
