= 2025 Hangzhou Open =

- Date: 17–23 September
- Edition: 2nd
- Category: ATP 250 tournaments
- Draw: 28S / 16D
- Surface: Hard / outdoor
- Location: Hangzhou, China
- Venue: Hangzhou Olympic Sports Expo Center

Champions

Singles
- (Kazakhstan) Alexander Bublik

Doubles
- (Portugal) Francisco Cabral / (Austria) Lucas Miedler
- Hangzhou Open

The 2025 Lynk & Co Hangzhou Open was a men's tennis tournament played on outdoor hardcourts. It was the second edition of the Hangzhou Open an ATP 250 tournament on the 2025 ATP Tour. It took place at the Hangzhou Olympic Sports Expo Center in Hangzhou, China, from 17 September until 23 September 2025.

== Champions ==
=== Singles ===
- (Kazakhstan) Alexander Bublik def. (France) Valentin Royer, 7–6^{(7–4)}, 7–6^{(7–4)}

=== Doubles ===
- (Portugal) Francisco Cabral / (Austria) Lucas Miedler def. (Colombia) Nicolás Barrientos / (Netherlands) David Pel, 6–4, 6–4

== Singles main-draw entrants ==
=== Seeds ===
Country	Player	Rank^{1}	Seed
	Andrey Rublev	14	1
	Daniil Medvedev	18	2
KAZ	Alexander Bublik	19	3
FRA	Corentin Moutet	39	4
ARG	Camilo Ugo Carabelli	43	5
FRA	Adrian Mannarino	53	6
USA	Learner Tien	54	7
ITA	Matteo Berrettini	57	8

- ^{1} Rankings are as of 15 September 2025

=== Other entrants ===
The following players received wildcards into the singles main draw:

- (China) Sun Fajing
- (China) Wu Yibing
- (China) Zhang Zhizhen

The following players received entry from the qualifying draw:

- (United States) Nishesh Basavareddy
- (Australia) Rinky Hijikata
- (France) Valentin Royer
- (Italy) Giulio Zeppieri

The following player received entry as a lucky loser:

- (Czech Republic) Dalibor Svrčina

=== Withdrawals ===
- (Spain) Roberto Bautista Agut → replaced by (Czech Republic) Dalibor Svrčina
- (Italy) Mattia Bellucci → replaced by (Australia) Adam Walton
- (Serbia) Laslo Djere → replaced by (Australia) Aleksandar Vukic
- Karen Khachanov → replaced by (China) Bu Yunchaokete

== Doubles main-draw entrants ==
=== Seeds ===
Country	Player	Country	Player	Rank^{1}	Seed
POR	Francisco Cabral	AUT	Lucas Miedler	59	1
USA	Robert Cash	USA	JJ Tracy	71	2
BRA	Fernando Romboli	AUS	John-Patrick Smith	90	3
ARG	Guido Andreozzi	FRA	Manuel Guinard	95	4

- ^{1} Rankings are as of 15 September 2025

=== Other entrants ===
The following pairs received wildcards into the doubles main draw:

- (China) Bu Yunchaokete / (United States) Sebastian Korda
- (China) Wu Yibing / (United States) Learner Tien

The following pair received entry with a protected ranking:

- (India) Arjun Kadhe / (India) Vijay Sundar Prashanth
