= Constantin Frantzen =

German tennis player

- Country (sports): Germany
- Born: 16 March 1998 (age 28) Düsseldorf, Germany
- Height: 1.93 m (6 ft 4 in)
- Plays: Right-handed (two-handed backhand)
- College: Baylor University
- Prize money: US $952,284

Singles
- Career record: 0–0
- Career titles: 0
- Highest ranking: No. 1226 (20 February 2023)

Doubles
- Career record: 71–73
- Career titles: 2
- Highest ranking: No. 29 (24 August 2026)
- Current ranking: No. 36 (26 October 2026)

Grand Slam doubles results
- Australian Open: 1R (2024, 2025, 2026)
- French Open: 2R (2025)
- Wimbledon: QF (2024)
- US Open: QF (2025)
- Last updated on: 26 October 2026.

Constantin Frantzen (born 16 March 1998) is a German professional tennis player who specializes in doubles. He has a career-high ATP doubles ranking of world No. 29 achieved on 24 August 2026.

Frantzen has won one ATP Tour doubles title at the 2025 Chengdu Open, with Robin Haase.

He played college tennis at Baylor University.

== Career ==
=== 2023–2024: ATP and major debuts in doubles ===
Frantzen made his ATP Tour doubles main draw debut at the Swiss Open Gstaad alongside Hendrik Jebens.

He reached his first ATP Tour final at the Moselle Open with partner Jebens, but lost to Hugo Nys and Jan Zieliński. Frantzen reached his second ATP Tour final at the 2024 Generali Open Kitzbühel also alongside Jebens but lost to Alexander Erler and Andreas Mies. The pair also made it to the 2024 Hangzhou Open final, losing to Jeevan Nedunchezhiyan and Vijay Sundar Prashanth in the final.

=== 2025: Maiden ATP title ===
In September, Frantzen won his first doubles title on the ATP Tour at the Chengdu Open, playing alongside Robin Haase.

== Doubles performance timeline ==
Key
W	F	SF	QF	#R	RR	Q#	DNQ	A	NH

(W) winner; (F) finalist; (SF) semifinalist; (QF) quarterfinalist; (#R) rounds 4, 3, 2, 1; (RR) round-robin stage; (Q#) qualification round; (DNQ) did not qualify; (A) absent; (NH) not held; (SR) strike rate (events won / competed); (W–L) win–loss record.
To avoid confusion and double counting, these charts are updated at the conclusion of a tournament or when the player's participation has ended.

Current through the 2026 Stockholm Open.

Tournament	2023	2024	2025	2026	SR	W–L
Grand Slam tournaments
Australian Open	A	1R	1R	1R	0 / 3	0–3
French Open	A	1R	2R	1R	0 / 3	1–3
Wimbledon	A	QF	3R	1R	0 / 3	5–3
US Open	A	1R	QF	1R	0 / 3	3–3
Win–loss	0–0	3–4	6–4	0–4	0 / 12	9–12
ATP 1000 tournaments
Indian Wells Open	A	A	1R	QF	0 / 2	2–2
Miami Open	A	A	1R	1R	0 / 2	0–2
Madrid Open	A	A	2R	A	0 / 1	1–1
Cincinnati Open	A	A	A	F	0 / 1	4–1
Shanghai Masters	A	A	A	1R	0 / 1	0–1
Win–loss	0–0	0–0	1–3	6–4	0 / 7	7–7
Career statistics
Tournaments	5	20	25	28	78	
Titles	0	0	1	1	2	
Finals	1	2	1	4	8	
Overall win–loss	3–5	19–20	23–23	30–27	75–75	
Year-end ranking	65	52	48		50%	

== Significant finals ==
=== ATP 1000 tournaments ===
==== Doubles: 1 (runner-up) ====
Result	Year	Tournament	Surface	Partner	Opponents	Score
Loss	2026	Cincinnati Open	Hard	(Netherlands) Robin Haase	(Brazil) Orlando Luz (Brazil) Rafael Matos	4–6, 6–3, [7–10]

== ATP Tour finals ==
=== Doubles: 8 (2 titles, 6 runner-ups) ===
Legend Grand Slam (–) ATP 1000 (0–1) ATP 500 (0–1) ATP 250 (2–4)	Finals by surface Hard (2–4) Clay (0–2) Grass (–)	Finals by setting Outdoor (1–4) Indoor (1–2)

Result	W–L	Date	Tournament	Tier	Surface	Partner	Opponents	Score
Loss	0–1	Nov 2023	Moselle Open, France	ATP 250	Hard (i)	(Germany) Hendrik Jebens	(Monaco) Hugo Nys (Poland) Jan Zieliński	4–6, 4–6
Loss	0–2	Jul 2024	Austrian Open, Austria	ATP 250	Clay	(Germany) Hendrik Jebens	(Austria) Alexander Erler (Germany) Andreas Mies	3–6, 6–3, [6–10]
Loss	0–3	Sep 2024	Hangzhou Open, China	ATP 250	Hard	(Germany) Hendrik Jebens	(India) Jeevan Nedunchezhiyan (India) Vijay Sundar Prashanth	6–4, 6–7^{(5–7)}, [7–10]
Win	1–3	Sep 2025	Chengdu Open, China	ATP 250	Hard	(Netherlands) Robin Haase	(United States) Vasil Kirkov (Netherlands) Bart Stevens	4–6, 6–3, [10–7]
Loss	1–4	Feb 2026	Open Occitanie, France	ATP 250	Hard (i)	(Netherlands) Robin Haase	(France) Théo Arribagé (France) Albano Olivetti	6–7^{(6–8)}, 1–6
Loss	1–5	Feb 2026	Rio Open, Brazil	ATP 500	Clay	(Netherlands) Robin Haase	(Brazil) João Fonseca (Brazil) Marcelo Melo	6–4, 3–6, [8–10]
Loss	1–6	Aug 2026	Cincinnati Open, United States	ATP 1000	Hard	(Netherlands) Robin Haase	(Brazil) Orlando Luz (Brazil) Rafael Matos	4–6, 6–3, [7–10]
Win	2–6	Oct 2026	European Open, Belgium	ATP 250	Hard (i)	(United States) Robert Galloway	(France) Sadio Doumbia (Netherlands) Bart Stevens	6–7^{(4–7)}, 6–4, [10–8]

== ATP Challenger finals ==
=== Doubles: 18 (9 titles, 9 runner-ups) ===
Finals by surface
Hard (2–5)
Clay (7–3)
Carpet (0–1)

Result	W–L	Date	Tournament	Surface	Partner	Opponents	Score
Loss	0–1	Sep 2022	Columbus, United States	Hard	(United Kingdom) Charles Broom	(United Kingdom) Julian Cash (United Kingdom) Henry Patten	2–6, 5–7
Loss	0–2	Oct 2022	Las Vegas, United States	Hard	(United States) Reese Stalder	(United Kingdom) Julian Cash (United Kingdom) Henry Patten	4–6, 6–7^{(1–7)}
Loss	0–3	Mar 2023	Pau, France	Hard (i)	(United Kingdom) Julian Cash	(France) Dan Added (France) Albano Olivetti	6–3, 1–6, [8–10]
Loss	0–4	Mar 2023	Lugano, Switzerland	Hard (i)	(Germany) Hendrik Jebens	(Belgium) Zizou Bergs (Netherlands) David Pel	2–6, 6–7^{(6–8)}
Win	1–4	Mar 2023	Biel/Bienne, Switzerland	Hard (i)	(Germany) Hendrik Jebens	(Romania) Victor Vlad Cornea (Croatia) Franko Škugor	6–2, 6–4
Loss	1–5	May 2023	Mauthausen, Austria	Clay	(Germany) Hendrik Jebens	(Monaco) Romain Arneodo (Austria) Sam Weissborn	4–6, 2–6
Win	2–5	Jun 2023	Heilbronn, Germany	Clay	(Germany) Hendrik Jebens	(Romania) Victor Vlad Cornea (Austria) Philipp Oswald	7–6^{(9–7)}, 6–4
Loss	2–6	Jun 2023	Lyon, France	Clay	(Germany) Hendrik Jebens	(France) Manuel Guinard (France) Grégoire Jacq	4–6, 6–2, [7–10]
Win	3–6	Aug 2023	Augsburg, Germany	Clay	(Germany) Hendrik Jebens	(France) Constantin Kouzmine (Ukraine) Volodymyr Uzhylovskyi	6–2, 6–2
Win	4–6	Sep 2023	Como, Italy	Clay	(Germany) Hendrik Jebens	(Sweden) Filip Bergevi (Netherlands) Mick Veldheer	6–3, 6–4
Win	5–6	Sep 2023	Bad Waltersdorf, Austria	Clay	(Germany) Hendrik Jebens	(Italy) Marco Bortolotti (Italy) Francesco Passaro	6–1, 6–2
Win	6–6	Oct 2023	Orléans, France	Hard (i)	(Germany) Hendrik Jebens	(United Kingdom) Henry Patten (Australia) John-Patrick Smith	7–6^{(7–5)}, 7–6^{(14–12)}
Loss	6–7	Nov 2023	Ismaning, Germany	Carpet (i)	(Germany) Hendrik Jebens	(India) Sriram Balaji (Germany) Andre Begemann	6–7^{(4–7)}, 4–6
Loss	6–8	Mar 2024	Lugano, Switzerland	Hard (i)	(Germany) Hendrik Jebens	(Netherlands) Sander Arends (Netherlands) Sem Verbeek	7–6^{(11–9)}, 6–7^{(1–7)}, [8–10]
Win	7–8	May 2024	Mauthausen, Austria	Clay	(Germany) Hendrik Jebens	(United States) Ryan Seggerman (United States) Patrik Trhac	6–4, 6–4
Win	8–8	Mar 2025	Naples, Italy	Clay	(Austria) Alexander Erler	(France) Geoffrey Blancaneaux (France) Albano Olivetti	6–4, 6–4
Loss	8–9	Jun 2025	Sassuolo, Italy	Clay	(Austria) Alexander Erler	(Australia) Matthew Romios (United States) Ryan Seggerman	6–7^{(4–7)}, 6–3, [7–10]
Win	9–9	May 2026	Valencia, Spain	Clay	(Netherlands) Robin Haase	(Netherlands) Sander Arends (Netherlands) David Pel	6–4, 6–7^{(5–7)}, [11–9]

== ITF Tour finals ==
=== Doubles: 11 (5 titles, 6 runner-ups) ===
Finals by surface
Hard (1–4)
Clay (3–2)
Carpet (1–0)

Result	W–L	Date	Tournament	Surface	Partner	Opponents	Score
Win	1–0	Oct 2015	Ismaning, Germany	Carpet (i)	(Austria) Alexander Erler	(Germany) Kevin Krawietz (Germany) Tim Sandkaulen	2–6, 7–5^{(7–5)}, [10–8]
Loss	1–1	Oct 2021	M15 Lubbock, United States	Hard	(Slovenia) Sven Lah	(United States) Sekou Bangoura (Netherlands) Gijs Brouwer	4–6, 6–4, [5–10]
Loss	1–2	Nov 2021	M25 Harlingen, United States	Hard	(Romania) Gabi Adrian Boitan	(Philippines) Francis Alcantara (United Kingdom) Mark Whitehouse	6–7^{(3–7)}, 7–5, [7–10]
Loss	1–3	Feb 2022	M25 Glasgow, United Kingdom	Hard (i)	(United Kingdom) Charles Broom	(Netherlands) Gijs Brouwer (United Kingdom) Aidan McHugh	6–4, 6–7^{(1–7)}, [4–10]
Loss	1–4	Apr 2022	M15 Monastir, Tunisia	Hard	(Germany) Tim Sandkaulen	(Poland) Szymon Kielan (Poland) Michał Mikuła	6–7^{(4–7)}, 7–6^{(7–2)}, [2–10]
Win	2–4	Apr 2022	M15 Monastir, Tunisia	Hard	(United Kingdom) Charles Broom	(China) Li Zhe (China) Bu Yunchaokete	7–5, 2–6, [10–8]
Win	3–4	May 2022	M15 Meerbusch, Germany	Clay	(Germany) Tim Sandkaulen	(Chile) Miguel Fernando Pereira (Brazil) Gabriel Roveri Sidney	7–6^{(7–5)}, 6–4
Win	4–4	May 2022	M25 Most, Czech Republic	Clay	(Germany) Tim Sandkaulen	(Czech Republic) Marek Gengel (Czech Republic) David Poljak	6–3, 4–6, [10–7]
Loss	4–5	Jun 2022	M25 Arlon, Belgium	Clay	(Germany) Tim Sandkaulen	(India) Anirudh Chandrasekar (India) Vijay Sundar Prashanth	6–7^{(5–7)}, 4–6
Win	5–5	Jul 2022	M25 Kassel, Germany	Clay	(Germany) Tim Sandkaulen	(Germany) Tom Gentzsch (Germany) Leopold Zima	6–4, 6–2
Loss	5–6	Aug 2022	M25 Wetzlar, Germany	Clay	(Germany) Tim Sandkaulen	(Lebanon) Benjamin Hassan (France) Tristan Lamasine	4–6, 3–6
