= Hangzhou Open =

ATP Tour
- Event name: Hangzhou Open
- Tour: ATP Tour
- Founded: 2024; 2 years ago
- Location: Hangzhou; China
- Venue: Hangzhou Olympic Sports Center
- Category: ATP 250
- Surface: Hard / Outdoor
- Prize money: US$1,019,185
- Website: Website

Current champions (2026)
- Singles: Daniil Medvedev
- Doubles: (Portugal) Francisco Cabral (United States) JJ Tracy

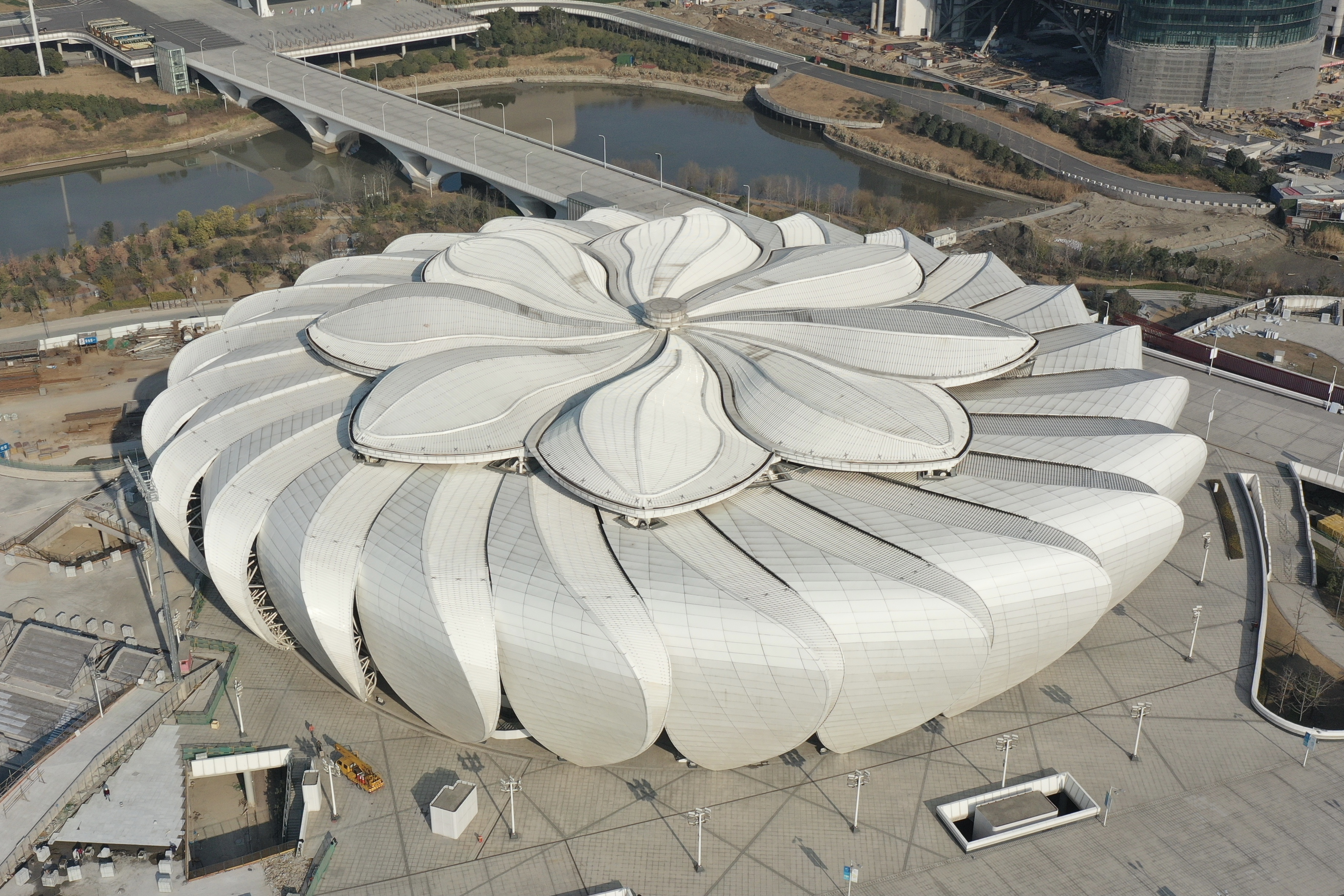
retractable roof at Tennis Center in Hangzhou

The AITO Hangzhou Open is a men's ATP Tour 250 series tournament played on outdoor hardcourts. It was launched as part of the 2024 ATP Tour, replacing the Zhuhai Championships. It takes place at the Hangzhou Olympic Expo Center in Hangzhou, China.

== Results ==
=== Singles ===
Year	Champion	Runner-up	Score
2024	(Croatia) Marin Čilić	(China) Zhang Zhizhen	7–6^{(7–5)}, 7–6^{(7–5)}
2025	(Kazakhstan) Alexander Bublik	(France) Valentin Royer	7–6^{(7–4)}, 7–6^{(7–4)}
2026	Daniil Medvedev	Andrey Rublev	7–5, 6–4

=== Doubles ===
Year	Champion	Runner-up	Score
2024	(India) Jeevan Nedunchezhiyan (India) Vijay Sundar Prashanth	(Germany) Constantin Frantzen (Germany) Hendrik Jebens	4–6, 7–6^{(7–5)}, [10–7]
2025	(Portugal) Francisco Cabral (Austria) Lucas Miedler	(Colombia) Nicolás Barrientos (Netherlands) David Pel	6–4, 6–4
2026	(Portugal) Francisco Cabral (United States) JJ Tracy	(Netherlands) Sander Arends (Netherlands) David Pel	7–5, 6–4

== External link ==
- Hangzhou Open Overview
