= Matteo Berrettini career statistics =

Tennis statistics of Matteo Berrettini

This is a list of the main career statistics of Italian professional tennis player Matteo Berrettini. All statistics are according to the ATP Tour and ITF websites.

Career finals
Discipline	Type	Won	Lost	Total
Singles	Grand Slam	0	1	1
Singles	ATP Finals	–	–	–
Singles	ATP 1000	0	1	1
Singles	ATP 500	2	0	2
Singles	ATP 250	8	4	12
Singles	Olympics	–	–	–
Singles	Total	10	6	16
Doubles	Grand Slam	–	–	–
Doubles	ATP Finals	–	–	–
Doubles	ATP 1000	–	–	–
Doubles	ATP 500	–	–	–
Doubles	ATP 250	2	1	3
Doubles	Olympics	–	–	–
Doubles	Total	2	1	3

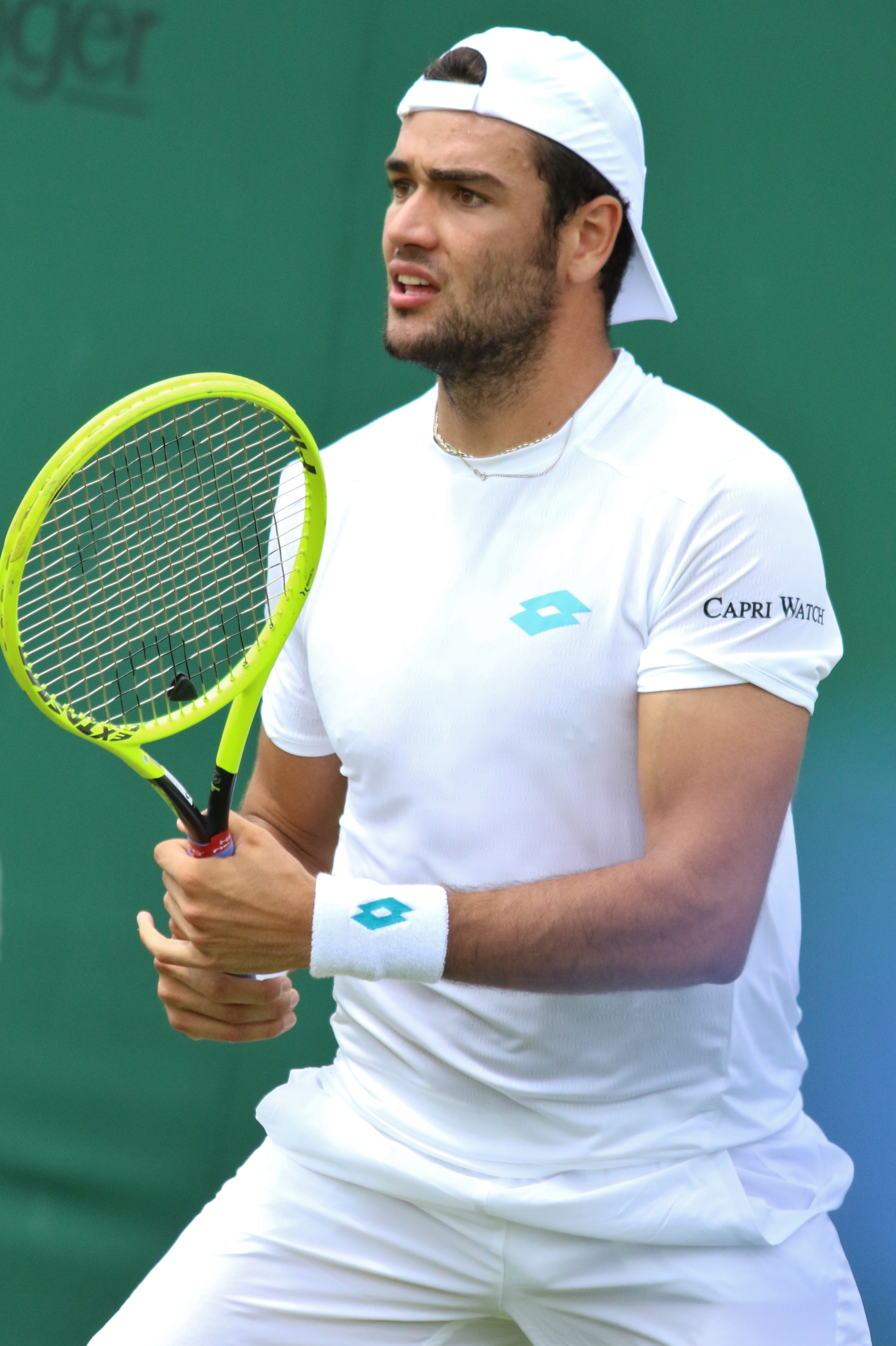
Berrettini at the 2019 Wimbledon Championships.

== Performance timelines ==
Key
W	F	SF	QF	#R	RR	Q#	DNQ	A	NH

(W) winner; (F) finalist; (SF) semifinalist; (QF) quarterfinalist; (#R) rounds 4, 3, 2, 1; (RR) round-robin stage; (Q#) qualification round; (DNQ) did not qualify; (A) absent; (NH) not held; (SR) strike rate (events won / competed); (W–L) win–loss record.
To avoid confusion and double counting, these charts are updated at the conclusion of a tournament or when the player's participation has ended.

=== Singles ===
Current through the 2026 US Open.

Tournament	2017	2018	2019	2020	2021	2022	2023	2024	2025	2026	SR	W–L	Win%
Grand Slam tournaments
Australian Open	A	1R	1R	2R	4R (Note: Berrettini withdrew before the fourth round of the 2021 Australian Open, which does not officially count as a loss.)	SF	1R	A	2R	A	0 / 7	10–6	63%
French Open	A	3R	2R	3R	QF (Note: Berrettini's fourth round opponent, Roger Federer, withdrew before the fourth round of the 2021 French Open, which does not officially count as a win.)	A	A	A	A	QF (Note: Berrettini withdrew during the quarterfinal match of the 2026 French Open due to injury.)	0 / 5	12–5	71%
Wimbledon	A	2R	4R	NH	F	A	4R	2R	1R	3R	0 / 7	16–7	70%
US Open	Q2	1R	SF	4R	QF	QF	2R	2R	A	2R	0 / 8	19–8	70%
Win–loss	0–0	3–4	9–4	6–3	16–3	9–2	4–3	2–2	1–2	7–3	0 / 27	57–26	69%
Year-end championships
ATP Finals	DNQ		RR	Alt	RR	Did not qualify					0 / 2	1–3	25%
National representation
Summer Olympics	not held				A	not held		A	not held		0 / 0	0–0	–
Davis Cup	A	A	RR	A		SF	A	W	W		2 / 4	12–2	86%
ATP 1000 tournaments
Indian Wells Open	A	2R	1R	NH	3R	4R	2R	A	3R	2R	0 / 7	5–7	42%
Miami Open	A	Q1	1R	NH	A	A	2R	1R	QF	3R	0 / 5	5–5	50%
Monte-Carlo Masters	A	A	1R	NH	2R	A	3R (Note: Berrettini withdrew before the third round of the 2023 Monte-Carlo Masters, which does not officially count as a loss.)	1R	3R	3R	0 / 6	6–5	55%
Madrid Open	A	Q1	A	NH	F	A	A	A	3R	1R	0 / 3	5–3	63%
Italian Open	1R	2R	3R	QF	3R	A	A	A	3R	1R	0 / 7	8–7	53%
Canadian Open	A	A	A	NH	A	1R	2R	A	A	1R	0 / 3	1–3	25%
Cincinnati Open	A	A	1R	3R	3R	1R	1R	1R	A	2R	0 / 7	3–7	30%
Shanghai Masters	A	Q2	SF	not held			A	2R	1R		0 / 3	5–3	63%
Paris Masters	A	A	2R	2R	A	A	A	1R	A		0 / 3	0–3	0%
Win–loss	0–1	1–2	6–7	3–3	8–5	2–3	3–4	1–5	8–6	6–7	0 / 44	38–43	47%
Career statistics
	2017	2018	2019	2020	2021	2022	2023	2024	2025	2026	Career		
Tournaments	1	20	24	6	14	11	10	15	17	14	Career total: 132		
Titles	0	1	2	0	2	2	0	3	0	0	Career total: 10		
Finals	0	1	3	0	4	4	0	4	0	0	Career total: 16		
Overall win–loss	0–1	19–19	43–25	9–6	41–12	32–12	12–11	32–12	22–17	16–14	10 / 132	226–129	64%
Win %	0%	50%	63%	60%	77%	73%	52%	73%	56%	53%	Career total: 64%		
Year-end ranking	135	54	8	10	7	16	92	34	56		$14,979,686		

=== Doubles ===
Current through the 2026 Cincinnati Open.

Tournament	2018	2019	2020	2021	2022	2023	2024	2025	2026	SR	W–L	Win%
Grand Slam tournaments
Australian Open	A	1R	A	A	A	A	A	A	A	0 / 1	0–1	0%
French Open	A	2R	A	A	A	A	A	A	A	0 / 1	1–1	50%
Wimbledon	1R	A	NH	A	A	A	A	A	A	0 / 1	0–1	0%
US Open	2R	A	A	A	A	A	A	A		0 / 1	1–1	50%
Win–loss	1–2	1–2	0–0	0–0	0–0	0–0	0–0	0–0	0–0	0 / 4	2–4	33%
ATP 1000 tournaments
Indian Wells Open	A	A	NH	A	A	A	A	QF	A	0 / 1	2–1	67%
Miami Open	A	A	NH	A	A	A	A	A	A	0 / 0	0–0	–
Monte-Carlo Masters	A	1R	NH	A	A	A	A	A	2R	0 / 2	1–2	33%
Madrid Open	A	A	NH	A	A	A	A	A	A	0 / 0	0–0	–
Italian Open	A	1R	A	A	A	A	A	1R	A	0 / 2	0–2	0%
Canadian Open	A	A	NH	A	A	A	A	A	A	0 / 0	0–0	–
Cincinnati Open	A	1R	A	A	A	A	A	A	A	0 / 1	0–1	0%
Shanghai Masters	A	2R	not held			A	A	A		0 / 1	1–1	50%
Paris Masters	A	A	A	A	A	A	A	A		0 / 0	0–0	–
Win–loss	0–0	1–4	0–0	0–0	0–0	0–0	0–0	2–2	1–1	0 / 7	4–7	36%
Career statistics
	2018	2019	2020	2021	2022	2023	2024	2025	2026	SR	W–L	Win %
Tournaments	5	12	0	4	1	1	0	2	1	Career total: 26		
Titles	2	0	0	0	0	0	0	0	0	Career total: 2		
Finals	2	1	0	0	0	0	0	0	0	Career total: 3		
Overall win–loss	9–3	7–10	0–0	5–5	2–5	0–1	1–0	2–2	1–1	2 / 26	27–26	51%
Win %	75%	41%	–	50%	29%	0%	100%	50%	50%	Career total: 51%		
Year-end ranking	125	208	220	267	824	—	—	356				

== Grand Slam tournaments finals ==
=== Singles: 1 (runner-up) ===
Result	Year	Tournament	Surface	Opponent	Score
Loss	2021	Wimbledon	Grass	(Serbia) Novak Djokovic	7–6^{(7–4)}, 4–6, 4–6, 3–6

== Other significant finals ==
=== ATP 1000 tournaments ===
==== Singles: 1 (runner-up) ====
Result	Year	Tournament	Surface	Opponent	Score
Loss	2021	Madrid Open	Clay	(Germany) Alexander Zverev	7–6^{(10–8)}, 4–6, 3–6

== ATP Tour finals ==
=== Singles: 16 (10 titles, 6 runner-ups) ===
Legend Grand Slam (0–1) ATP Finals (0–0) ATP 1000 (0–1) ATP 500 (2–0) ATP 250 (8–4)	Finals by surface Hard (0–1) Clay (6–3) Grass (4–2)	Finals by setting Outdoor (10–6) Indoor (0–0)

Result	W–L	Date	Tournament	Tier	Surface	Opponent	Score
Win	1–0	Jul 2018	Swiss Open, Switzerland	ATP 250	Clay	(Spain) Roberto Bautista Agut	7–6^{(11–9)}, 6–4
Win	2–0	Apr 2019	Hungarian Open, Hungary	ATP 250	Clay	(Serbia) Filip Krajinović	4–6, 6–3, 6–1
Loss	2–1	May 2019	Bavarian Championships, Germany	ATP 250	Clay	(Chile) Cristian Garín	1–6, 6–3, 6–7^{(1–7)}
Win	3–1	Jun 2019	Stuttgart Open, Germany	ATP 250	Grass	(Canada) Félix Auger-Aliassime	6–4, 7–6^{(13–11)}
Win	4–1	Apr 2021	Serbia Open, Serbia	ATP 250	Clay	(Russia) Aslan Karatsev	6–1, 3–6, 7–6^{(7–0)}
Loss	4–2	May 2021	Madrid Open, Spain	ATP 1000	Clay	(Germany) Alexander Zverev	7–6^{(10–8)}, 4–6, 3–6
Win	5–2	Jun 2021	Queen's Club Championships, UK	ATP 500	Grass	(United Kingdom) Cameron Norrie	6–4, 6–7^{(5–7)}, 6–3
Loss	5–3	Jul 2021	Wimbledon, UK	Grand Slam	Grass	(Serbia) Novak Djokovic	7–6^{(7–4)}, 4–6, 4–6, 3–6
Win	6–3	Jun 2022	Stuttgart Open, Germany (2)	ATP 250	Grass	(United Kingdom) Andy Murray	6–4, 5–7, 6–3
Win	7–3	Jun 2022	Queen's Club Championships, UK (2)	ATP 500	Grass	(Serbia) Filip Krajinović	7–5, 6–4
Loss	7–4	Jul 2022	Swiss Open, Switzerland	ATP 250	Clay	(Norway) Casper Ruud	6–4, 6–7^{(4–7)}, 2–6
Loss	7–5	Oct 2022	Tennis Napoli Cup, Italy	ATP 250	Hard	(Italy) Lorenzo Musetti	6–7^{(5–7)}, 2–6
Win	8–5	Apr 2024	Grand Prix Hassan II, Morocco	ATP 250	Clay	(Spain) Roberto Carballés Baena	7–5, 6–2
Loss	8–6	Jun 2024	Stuttgart Open, Germany	ATP 250	Grass	(United Kingdom) Jack Draper	6–3, 6–7^{(5–7)}, 4–6
Win	9–6	Jul 2024	Swiss Open, Switzerland (2)	ATP 250	Clay	(France) Quentin Halys	6–3, 6–1
Win	10–6	Jul 2024	Austrian Open Kitzbühel, Austria	ATP 250	Clay	(France) Hugo Gaston	7–5, 6–3

=== Doubles: 3 (2 titles, 1 runner-up) ===
Legend Grand Slam (0–0) ATP Finals (0–0) ATP 1000 (0–0) ATP 500 (0–0) ATP 250 (2–1)	Finals by surface Hard (1–1) Clay (1–0) Grass (0–0)	Finals by setting Outdoor (0–0) Indoor (0–0)

Result	W–L	Date	Tournament	Tier	Surface	Partner	Opponents	Score
Win	1–0	Jul 2018	Swiss Open, Switzerland	ATP 250	Clay	(Italy) Daniele Bracciali	(Ukraine) Denys Molchanov (Slovakia) Igor Zelenay	7–6^{(7–2)}, 7–6^{(7–5)}
Win	2–0	Sep 2018	St. Petersburg Open, Russia	ATP 250	Hard (i)	(Italy) Fabio Fognini	(Czech Republic) Roman Jebavý (Netherlands) Matwé Middelkoop	7–6^{(8–6)}, 7–6^{(7–4)}
Loss	2–1	Sep 2019	St. Petersburg Open, Russia	ATP 250	Hard (i)	(Italy) Simone Bolelli	(India) Divij Sharan (Slovakia) Igor Zelenay	3–6, 6–3, [8–10]

== ATP Challenger and ITF Futures finals ==
=== Singles: 13 (5 titles, 8 runner-ups) ===
Legend ATP Challenger Tour (3–6) ITF Futures (2–2)	Finals by surface Hard (2–6) Clay (2–1) Carpet (1–1)

Result	W–L	Date	Tournament	Tier	Surface	Opponent	Score
Loss	0–1	Nov 2016	Castel del Monte International, Italy	Challenger	Carpet (i)	(Italy) Luca Vanni	7–5, 0–6, 3–6
Loss	0–2	Mar 2017	Quanzhou International, China	Challenger	Hard	(Italy) Thomas Fabbiano	6–7^{(5–7)}, 6–7^{(7–9)}
Win	1–2	Jul 2017	San Benedetto Tennis Cup, Italy	Challenger	Clay	(Serbia) Laslo Đere	6–3, 6–4
Loss	1–3	Aug 2017	Tilia Slovenia Open, Slovenia	Challenger	Hard (i)	(Ukraine) Sergiy Stakhovsky	7–6^{(7–4)}, 6–7^{(6–8)}, 3–6
Loss	1–4	Sep 2017	Amex-Istanbul Challenger, Turkey	Challenger	Hard	(Tunisia) Malek Jaziri	6–7^{(4–7)}, 6–0, 5–7
Win	2–4	Feb 2018	Trofeo Faip–Perrel, Italy	Challenger	Hard	(Italy) Stefano Napolitano	6–2, 3–6, 6–2
Loss	2–5	Mar 2018	Irving Tennis Classic, US	Challenger	Hard	(Kazakhstan) Mikhail Kukushkin	2–6, 6–3, 1–6
Win	3–5	Mar 2019	Arizona Tennis Classic, US	Challenger	Hard	(Kazakhstan) Mikhail Kukushkin	3–6, 7–6^{(8–6)}, 7–6^{(7–2)}
Loss	3–6	Mar 2024	Arizona Tennis Classic, US	Challenger	Hard	(Portugal) Nuno Borges	5–7, 6–7^{(4–7)}
Loss	0–1	Sep 2015	F36 Antalya, Turkey	Futures	Hard	(Croatia) Matija Pecotić	7–6^{(8–6)}, 6–7^{(4–7)}, 2–6
Win	1–1	Oct 2015	F30 Santa Margherita di Pula, Italy	Futures	Clay	(Italy) Andrea Basso	4–6, 6–3, 6–3
Loss	1–2	Sep 2016	F28 Reggio Emilia, Italy	Futures	Clay	(Italy) Stefano Travaglia	Walkover
Win	2–2	Feb 2017	F1 Oberentfelden, Switzerland	Futures	Carpet (i)	(France) Laurent Lokoli	6–2, 6–4

=== Doubles: 5 (4 titles, 1 runner-up) ===
Legend ATP Challenger Tour (0–0) ITF Futures (4–1)	Finals by surface Hard (1–0) Clay (3–1)

Result	W–L	Date	Tournament	Tier	Surface	Partner	Opponents	Score
Win	1–0	Mar 2015	F12 Antalya, Turkey	Futures	Hard	(Italy) Filippo Baldi	(Italy) Edoardo Eremin (Italy) Lorenzo Sonego	6–7^{(3–7)}, 6–2, [10–0]
Loss	1–1	May 2015	F9 Santa Margherita di Pula, Italy	Futures	Clay	(Italy) Filippo Baldi	(Italy) Pietro Licciardi (Italy) Pietro Rondoni	6–3, 4–6, [7–10]
Win	2–1	Oct 2015	F30 Santa Margherita di Pula, Italy	Futures	Clay	(Italy) Andrea Pellegrino	(Italy) Filippo Baldi (Italy) Gianluca Naso	Walkover
Win	3–1	Sep 2016	F27 Trieste, Italy	Futures	Clay	(Italy) Jacopo Stefani	(Germany) Florian Fallert (Germany) Tobias Simon	7–6^{(7–3)}, 6–3
Win	4–1	Sep 2016	F28 Reggio Emilia, Italy	Futures	Clay	(Italy) Jacopo Stefani	(Italy) Andrea Pellegrino (Italy) Andrea Vavassori	6–3, 7–6^{(7–5)}

== Wins over top 10 players ==
- Berrettini has a 12–31 (27.91%) record against players who were, at the time the match was played, ranked in the top 10.

Season	2019	2020	2021	2022	2023	2024	2025	2026	Total
Wins	6	0	1	0	2	0	2	1	12

#	Player	Rk	Event	Surface	Rd	Score	Rk	Ref
2019
1.	(Germany) Alexander Zverev	5	Italian Open, Italy	Clay	2R	7–5, 7–5	33	
2.	(Russia) Karen Khachanov	9	Stuttgart Open, Germany	Grass	2R	6–4, 6–2	30	
3.	(Russia) Karen Khachanov	9	Halle Open, Germany	Grass	QF	6–2, 7–6^{(7–4)}	22	
4.	(Spain) Roberto Bautista Agut	10	Shanghai Masters, China	Hard	3R	7–6^{(7–5)}, 6–4	13	
5.	(Austria) Dominic Thiem	5	Shanghai Masters, China	Hard	QF	7–6^{(10–8)}, 6–4	13	
6.	(Austria) Dominic Thiem	5	ATP Finals, United Kingdom	Hard (i)	RR	7–6^{(7–3)}, 6–3	8	
2021
7.	(Austria) Dominic Thiem	3	ATP Cup, Australia	Hard	RR	6–2, 6–4	10	
2023
8.	(Norway) Casper Ruud	3	United Cup, Australia	Hard	RR	6–4, 6–4	16	
9.	(Poland) Hubert Hurkacz	10	United Cup, Australia	Hard	HCF	6–4, 3–6, 6–3	16	
2025
10.	(Serbia) Novak Djokovic	7	Qatar Open, Qatar	Hard	1R	7–6^{(7–4)}, 6–2	35	
11.	(Germany) Alexander Zverev	2	Monte-Carlo Masters, France	Clay	2R	2–6, 6–3, 7–5	34	
2026
12.	Daniil Medvedev	10	Monte-Carlo Masters, France	Clay	2R	6–0, 6–0	90	

- Key: (Rk) first use, opponent rank; (Rd) round; (Rk) 2nd use, player rank; (Ref) reference; (F) final; (SF) semifinal; (QF) quarterfinal; (#R) rounds 4, 3, 2, 1; (RR) round-robin stage; (Q#) qualifying rounds or stages (3), 2, 1.

* as of 8 April 2026

== Double-bagel matches ==
=== Singles ===
Result	W–L	Year	Tournament	Tier	Surface	Opponent	Rk	Rd
Win	1–0	2026	Monte-Carlo Masters, France	ATP 1000	Clay	Daniil Medvedev	10	2R

== Best Grand Slam results details ==
Australian Open
2022 Australian Open (7th Seed)
Round	Opponent	Score
1R	(United States) Brandon Nakashima	4–6, 6–2, 7–6^{(7–5)}, 6–3
2R	(United States) Stefan Kozlov (WC)	6–1, 4–6, 6–4, 6–1
3R	(Spain) Carlos Alcaraz (31)	6–2, 7–6^{(7–3)}, 4–6, 2–6, 7–6^{(10–5)}
4R	(Spain) Pablo Carreño Busta (19)	7–5, 7–6^{(7–4)}, 6–4
QF	(France) Gaël Monfils (17)	6–4, 6–4, 3–6, 3–6, 6–2
SF	(Spain) Rafael Nadal (6)	3–6, 2–6, 6–3, 3–6

Wimbledon
2021 Wimbledon (7th seed)
Round	Opponent	Score
1R	(Argentina) Guido Pella	6–4, 3–6, 6–4, 6–0
2R	(Netherlands) Botic van de Zandschulp (Q)	6–3, 6–4, 7–6^{(7–4)}
3R	(Slovenia) Aljaž Bedene	6–4, 6–4, 6–4
4R	(Belarus) Ilya Ivashka	6–4, 6–3, 6–1
QF	(Canada) Félix Auger-Aliassime (16)	6–3, 5–7, 7–5, 6–3
SF	(Poland) Hubert Hurkacz (14)	6–3, 6–0, 6–7^{(3–7)}, 6–4
F	(Serbia) Novak Djokovic (1)	7–6^{(7–4)}, 4–6, 4–6, 3–6

French Open
2021 French Open (9th Seed)
Round	Opponent	Score
1R	(Japan) Taro Daniel (Q)	6–0, 6–4, 4–6, 6–4
2R	(Argentina) Federico Coria	6–3, 6–3, 6–2
3R	(South Korea) Kwon Soon-woo	7–6^{(8–6)}, 6–3, 6–4
4R	(Switzerland) Roger Federer (8)	w/o
QF	(Serbia) Novak Djokovic (1)	3–6, 2–6, 7–6^{(7–5)}, 5–7

US Open
2019 US Open (24th Seed)
Round	Opponent	Score
1R	(France) Richard Gasquet	6–4, 6–3, 2–6, 6–2
2R	(Australia) Jordan Thompson	7–5, 7–6^{(7–5)}, 4–6, 6–1
3R	(Australia) Alexei Popyrin	6–4, 6–4, 6–7^{(3–7)}, 7–6^{(7–2)}
4R	(Russia) Andrey Rublev	6–1, 6–4, 7–6^{(8–6)}
QF	(France) Gaël Monfils (13)	3–6, 6–3, 6–2, 3–6, 7–6^{(7–5)}
SF	(Spain) Rafael Nadal (2)	6–7^{(6–8)}, 4–6, 1–6

== Grand Slam seedings ==
Year	Australian Open	French Open	Wimbledon	US Open
2017	DNQ	DNQ	DNQ	DNQ
2018	–	–	–	–
2019	–	29th	17th	24th
2020	8th	7th	NH	6th
2021	9th	9th	7th	6th
2022	7th	Did not play	Did not play	13th
2023	13th	Did not play	–	–
2024	Did not play	Did not play	–	–
2025	–	Did not play	32nd	Did not play
2026	Did not play	–	–	–

== ATP Tour career earnings ==
Year	Majors	ATP wins	Total wins	Earnings ($)	Money list rank
2013	0	0	0	$156	NA
2014	0	0	0	$1,649	NA
2015	0	0	0	$10,891	NA
2016	0	0	0	$8,679	782
2017	0	0	0	$88,024	276
2018	0	1	1	$781,675	79
2019	0	2	2	$3,439,782	8
2020	0	0	0	$762,245	30
2021	0	2	2	$3,231,908	6
2022	0	2	2	$2,218,287	18
2023	0	0	0	1,028,056	68
2024	0	3	3	917,658	85
2025	0	0	0	$1,222,092	68
2026	0	0	0	$87,015	169
Career*	0	10	10	$13,827,685	65

* Statistics correct as of 2 March 2026.

== Exhibition matches ==
=== Singles ===
Result	Date	Tournament	Surface	Opponent	Score
Win	Jul 2020	Ultimate Tennis Showdown, Sophia Antipolis, France	Hard (i)	(Greece) Stefanos Tsitsipas	16–15, 15–12, 12–14, 8–15, 3–2

== See also ==
- Italian players best ranking
- Best result of an Italian tennis player in Grand Slam
