= 2018 Swiss Open Gstaad =

- Date: 23–29 July
- Edition: 51st
- Category: ATP World Tour 250 Series
- Draw: 28S / 16D
- Prize money: €482,060
- Surface: Clay
- Location: Gstaad, Switzerland
- Venue: Roy Emerson Arena

Champions

Singles
- (Italy) Matteo Berrettini

Doubles
- (Italy) Matteo Berrettini / (Italy) Daniele Bracciali
- Swiss Open Gstaad

The 2018 Swiss Open Gstaad, also known as the 2018 J. Safra Sarasin Swiss Open Gstaad for sponsorship reasons, was a men's tennis tournament played on outdoor clay courts. It was the 51st edition of the Swiss Open, and part of the ATP World Tour 250 Series of the 2018 ATP World Tour. It took place at the Roy Emerson Arena in Gstaad, Switzerland, from 23 July through 29 July 2018. Unseeded Matteo Berrettini won the singles title.

== Finals ==
=== Singles ===
- (Italy) Matteo Berrettini defeated (Spain) Roberto Bautista Agut, 7–6^{(11–9)}, 6–4

=== Doubles ===
- (Italy) Matteo Berrettini / (Italy) Daniele Bracciali defeated (Ukraine) Denys Molchanov / (Slovakia) Igor Zelenay, 7–6^{(7–2)}, 7–6^{(7–5)}

== Singles main draw entrants ==
=== Seeds ===
Country	Player	Rank^{1}	Seed
ITA	Fabio Fognini	15	1
ESP	Roberto Bautista Agut	17	2
CRO	Borna Ćorić	21	3
RUS	Andrey Rublev	35	4
NED	Robin Haase	38	5
POR	João Sousa	45	6
ESP	Guillermo García López	62	7
ESP	Feliciano López	67	8

- ^{1} Rankings are as of 16 July 2018.

=== Other entrants ===
The following players received wildcards into the main draw:

- (Spain) Nicolás Almagro
- (Canada) Félix Auger-Aliassime
- (Switzerland) Marc-Andrea Hüsler

The following players received entry from the qualifying draw:

- (Argentina) Facundo Bagnis
- (Germany) Yannick Hanfmann
- (Spain) Adrián Menéndez Maceiras
- (Estonia) Jürgen Zopp

The following players received entry as lucky losers:

- (Croatia) Viktor Galović
- (Spain) Oriol Roca Batalla

=== Withdrawals ===
Before the tournament

- (Russia) Evgeny Donskoy → replaced by (Argentina) Guido Andreozzi
- (Kazakhstan) Mikhail Kukushkin → replaced by (Croatia) Viktor Galović
- (Argentina) Guido Pella → replaced by (Spain) Oriol Roca Batalla
- (Serbia) Viktor Troicki → replaced by (Uzbekistan) Denis Istomin

== Doubles main draw entrants ==
=== Seeds ===
Country	Player	Country	Player	Rank^{1}	Seed
NED	Robin Haase	NED	Matwé Middelkoop	68	1
MEX	Santiago González	POR	João Sousa	114	2
CZE	Roman Jebavý	ARG	Andrés Molteni	119	3
NED	Sander Arends	CRO	Antonio Šančić	133	4

- ^{1} Rankings are as of 16 July 2018.

=== Other entrants ===
The following pairs received wildcards into the doubles main draw:

- (Switzerland) Adrian Bodmer / (Switzerland) Jakub Paul
- (Switzerland) Marc-Andrea Hüsler / (Switzerland) Luca Margaroli

The following pair received entry as alternates:

- (Argentina) Guido Andreozzi / (Spain) Jaume Munar

=== Withdrawals ===
Before the tournament

- (Argentina) Guido Pella
