= Anna Markovych =

Ukrainian tennis player and coach

Anna Markovych (Makiïvka, 1982) is a tennis coach and former tennis player from Ukraine.

She was Ukraine's number 1-ranked tennis player from 1998 to 2003.

On 31 March 1999, she became a certified tennis coach and instructor. On 24 May 1999, Ukraine's Ministry of Sport awarded her the title of Master of Sport. In 2000, she completed her diploma in physical education and sport at Donetsk National Technical University. With her brother, Yaroslav Markovych, and her father, Vladimir Markovych, she runs a network of professional tennis players. She lives in Italy and became a Grade 2 tennis instructor in 2019, a qualification issued by the FIT (the Italian Tennis Federation). One of her pupils is the junior tennis player Rebecca Amerio, Italy's number one under-14 champion.
