= 2018 Swiss Open Gstaad – Singles =

Singles
- 2018 Swiss Open Gstaad

Final
- Champion: (Italy) Matteo Berrettini
- Runner-up: (Spain) Roberto Bautista Agut
- Score: 7–6^{(11–9)}, 6–4

Details
- Draw: 28
- Seeds: 8

Events
Singles	Doubles
- Swiss Open Gstaad

Fabio Fognini was the defending champion, but lost in the second round to Jürgen Zopp.

Matteo Berrettini won his first ATP World Tour title, defeating Roberto Bautista Agut in the final, 7–6^{(11–9)}, 6–4.

== Seeds ==
The top four seeds receive a bye into the second round.

1. (Italy) Fabio Fognini (second round)
2. (Spain) Roberto Bautista Agut (final)
3. (Croatia) Borna Ćorić (second round)
4. (Russia) Andrey Rublev (second round)
5. (Netherlands) Robin Haase (first round)
6. (Portugal) João Sousa (first round)
7. (Spain) Guillermo García López (first round)
8. (Spain) Feliciano López (quarterfinals)

== Draw ==
Key

- Q = Qualifier
- WC = Wild card
- LL = Lucky loser
- Alt = Alternate
- ITF = ITF entry
- PR = Protected ranking
- SR = Special ranking
- SE = Special exempt
- JE = Junior exempt
- JR = Junior Accelerator Programme entrant
- CO = College Accelerator Programme entrant
- NG = Next Gen Accelerator Program entrant
- w/o = Walkover
- r = Retired
- d = Defaulted

=== Finals ===
Semifinals
Q	(Estonia) Jürgen Zopp	4	6^{6}
(Italy) Matteo Berrettini	6	7^{8}
(Serbia) Laslo Đere	7^{7}	4	4
2	(Spain) Roberto Bautista Agut	6^{5}	6	6

Final
(Italy) Matteo Berrettini	7^{11}	6
2	(Spain) Roberto Bautista Agut	6^{9}	4

=== Top half ===
First round
Q	(Germany) Y Hanfmann	6	3	6^{4}
Q	(Estonia) J Zopp	3	6	7^{7}
WC	(Switzerland) M-A Hüsler	6^{8}	6	7^{7}
WC	(Spain) N Almagro	7^{10}	3	6^{4}
Q	(Argentina) F Bagnis	4	6	7
6	(Portugal) J Sousa	6	3	5
(Italy) M Berrettini	6	6
(Moldova) R Albot	4	2
LL	(Spain) O Roca Batalla	6	6^{4}	6
(Italy) P Lorenzi	3	7^{7}	3
(Argentina) F Delbonis	3	6^{3}
8	(Spain) F López	6	7^{7}

Second round
1	(Italy) F Fognini	1	6	3
Q	(Estonia) J Zopp	6	3	6
WC	(Switzerland) M-A Hüsler	6^{10}	1
Q	(Argentina) F Bagnis	7^{12}	6
4	(Russia) A Rublev	3	3
(Italy) M Berrettini	6	6
LL	(Spain) O Roca Batalla	6	6^{4}	4
8	(Spain) F López	4	7^{7}	6

Quarterfinals
Q	(Estonia) J Zopp	3	6	6
Q	(Argentina) F Bagnis	6	4	3
(Italy) M Berrettini	6	6
8	(Spain) F López	4	3

Semifinals
Q	(Estonia) J Zopp	4	6^{6}
(Italy) M Berrettini	6	7^{8}

=== Bottom half ===
First round
5	(Netherlands) R Haase	1	6	3
LL	(Croatia) V Galović	6	3	6
WC	(Canada) F Auger-Aliassime	6	7^{7}
(Argentina) G Andreozzi	3	6^{3}
(Serbia) L Đere	7^{8}	7
(Uzbekistan) D Istomin	6^{6}	5
7	(Spain) G García López	6^{3}	2
(Spain) R Carballés Baena	7^{7}	6
(Sweden) E Ymer	6^{9}	5
(Japan) T Daniel	7^{11}	7
(Spain) J Munar	6	6
Q	(Spain) A Menéndez Maceiras	1	0

Second round
LL	(Croatia) V Galović	3	6	6
WC	(Canada) F Auger-Aliassime	6	4	2
(Serbia) L Đere	6	1	6
3	(Croatia) B Ćorić	4	6	1
(Spain) R Carballés Baena	4	6	6^{4}
(Japan) T Daniel	6	4	7^{7}
(Spain) J Munar	6	3	2
2	(Spain) R Bautista Agut	2	6	6

Quarterfinals
LL	(Croatia) V Galović	7^{7}	3	6^{5}
(Serbia) L Đere	6^{5}	6	7^{7}
(Japan) T Daniel	5	1
2	(Spain) R Bautista Agut	7	6

Semifinals
(Serbia) L Đere	7^{7}	4	4
2	(Spain) R Bautista Agut	6^{5}	6	6

== Qualifying ==
=== Seeds ===
1. (Germany) Yannick Hanfmann (qualified)
2. (Estonia) Jürgen Zopp (qualified)
3. (Latvia) Ernests Gulbis (withdrew)
4. (Spain) Adrián Menéndez Maceiras (qualified)
5. (Argentina) Facundo Bagnis (qualified)
6. (Italy) Matteo Donati (first round)
7. (France) Kenny de Schepper (first round)
8. (Croatia) Viktor Galović (qualifying competition, lucky loser)

=== Qualifiers ===
1. (Germany) Yannick Hanfmann
2. (Estonia) Jürgen Zopp
3. (Argentina) Facundo Bagnis
4. (Spain) Adrián Menéndez Maceiras

=== Lucky losers ===
1. (Croatia) Viktor Galović
2. (Spain) Oriol Roca Batalla

=== Qualifying draw ===
==== First qualifier ====
First round
1	(Germany) Yannick Hanfmann	6	6
WC	(Switzerland) Luca Margaroli	4	2
Alt	(Ecuador) Gonzalo Escobar	3	6	6^{5}
8	(Croatia) Viktor Galović	6	3	7^{7}

Qualifying competition
1	(Germany) Yannick Hanfmann	6^{4}	7^{7}	6
8	(Croatia) Viktor Galović	7^{7}	6^{5}	4

==== Second qualifier ====
First round
2	(Estonia) Jürgen Zopp	6	6
Alt	(Argentina) Andrés Molteni	2	3
(Spain) Oriol Roca Batalla	6	7
7	(France) Kenny de Schepper	2	5

Qualifying competition
2	(Estonia) Jürgen Zopp	6	6
(Spain) Oriol Roca Batalla	3	4

==== Third qualifier ====
First round
Alt	(Switzerland) Yann Marti	6	6
Alt	(Switzerland) Adrian Bodmer	4	3
(Germany) Kevin Krawietz	3	6	2
5	(Argentina) Facundo Bagnis	6	4	6

Qualifying competition
Alt	(Switzerland) Yann Marti	d
5	(Argentina) Facundo Bagnis

==== Fourth qualifier ====
First round
4	(Spain) Adrián Menéndez Maceiras	6	7
PR	(Colombia) Santiago Giraldo	3	5
WC	(Switzerland) Jakub Paul	4	6	6
6	(Italy) Matteo Donati	6	4	4

Qualifying competition
4	(Spain) Adrián Menéndez Maceiras	6	6
WC	(Switzerland) Jakub Paul	3	0
