= 2024 Generali Open Kitzbühel – Singles =

Singles
- 2024 Generali Open Kitzbühel

Final
- Champion: (Italy) Matteo Berrettini
- Runner-up: (France) Hugo Gaston
- Score: 7–5, 6–3

Details
- Draw: 28
- Seeds: 8

Events
Singles	Doubles
- Generali Open Kitzbühel

Matteo Berrettini defeated Hugo Gaston in the final, 7–5, 6–3 to win the singles tennis title at the 2024 Austrian Open Kitzbühel. Berrettini did not drop a set en route to his tenth ATP Tour title, and his second title in as many weeks, after winning the Swiss Open the week before. It was Gaston's first ATP Tour final since the 2021 Swiss Open.

Sebastián Báez was the defending champion, but lost to Gaston in the quarterfinals.

== Seeds ==
The top four seeds received a bye into the second round.

1. (Argentina) Sebastián Báez (quarterfinals)
2. (Chile) Alejandro Tabilo (second round)
3. (Argentina) Tomás Martín Etcheverry (withdrew)
4. (Spain) Pedro Martínez (quarterfinals)
5. (Austria) Sebastian Ofner (first round)
6. (Portugal) Nuno Borges (withdrew)
7. (Spain) Roberto Carballés Baena (second round)
8. (Serbia) Laslo Djere (second round)

== Draw ==
Key

- Q = Qualifier
- WC = Wild card
- LL = Lucky loser
- Alt = Alternate
- ITF = ITF entry
- PR = Protected ranking
- SR = Special ranking
- SE = Special exempt
- JE = Junior exempt
- JR = Junior Accelerator Programme entrant
- CO = College Accelerator Programme entrant
- NG = Next Gen Accelerator Program entrant
- w/o = Walkover
- r = Retired
- d = Defaulted

=== Finals ===
Semifinals
(France) Hugo Gaston	6	2
(Argentina) Facundo Díaz Acosta	1	0^{r}
(Germany) Yannick Hanfmann	4	4
(Italy) Matteo Berrettini	6	6

Final
(France) Hugo Gaston	5	3
(Italy) Matteo Berrettini	7	6

=== Top half ===
First round
SE	(Argentina) TA Tirante	6	6
(Austria) D Thiem	2	4
(France) H Gaston	6	6^{5}	6
(Germany) D Altmaier	4	7^{7}	4
(Hungary) M Fucsovics	6	2	3
7	(Spain) R Carballés Baena	4	6	6
Q	(Slovakia) L Klein	4	6	6^{3}
(India) S Nagal	6	1	7^{7}
(Argentina) F Díaz Acosta	2	6	6
(Argentina) F Coria	6	3	0
Q	(Colombia) DE Galán	6	5	6
LL	(Serbia) H Medjedovic	4	7	3

Second round
1	(Argentina) S Báez	6	6
SE	(Argentina) TA Tirante	3	3
(France) H Gaston	6	7^{7}
7	(Spain) R Carballés Baena	2	6^{5}
4	(Spain) P Martínez	7	7
(India) S Nagal	5	5
(Argentina) F Díaz Acosta	6	4	6
Q	(Colombia) DE Galán	2	6	3

Quarterfinals
1	(Argentina) S Báez	5	7	6^{6}
(France) H Gaston	7	5	7^{8}
4	(Spain) P Martínez	7^{7}	3	4
(Argentina) F Díaz Acosta	6^{2}	6	6

Semifinals
(France) H Gaston	6	2
(Argentina) F Díaz Acosta	1	0^{r}

=== Bottom half ===
First round
8	(Serbia) L Djere	7^{8}	6
Q	(Czech Republic) V Kopřiva	6^{6}	3
(Brazil) T Seyboth Wild	6	7^{8}
WC	(Austria) J Schwärzler	2	6^{6}
(Spain) J Munar	3	4
(Germany) Y Hanfmann	6	6
5	(Austria) S Ofner	4	6	6^{3}
WC	(Austria) L Neumayer	6	4	7^{7}
WC	(United States) N Moreno de Alboran	6	6
Q	(Argentina) A Collarini	4	4
(Italy) M Berrettini	7^{8}	7^{7}
P Kotov	6^{6}	6^{5}

Second round
8	(Serbia) L Djere	6	3	2
(Brazil) T Seyboth Wild	4	6	6
(Germany) Y Hanfmann	6	1	6
LL	(Brazil) G Heide	3	6	2
WC	(Austria) L Neumayer	4	4
WC	(United States) N Moreno de Alboran	6	6
(Italy) M Berrettini	7^{7}	7^{7}
2	(Chile) A Tabilo	6^{4}	6^{5}

Quarterfinals
(Brazil) T Seyboth Wild	6^{2}	4
(Germany) Y Hanfmann	7^{7}	6
WC	(United States) N Moreno de Alboran	6^{5}	3
(Italy) M Berrettini	7^{7}	6

Semifinals
(Germany) Y Hanfmann	4	4
(Italy) M Berrettini	6	6

== Qualifying ==
=== Seeds ===
1. (Spain) Albert Ramos Viñolas (first round)
2. (Czech Republic) Vít Kopřiva (qualified)
3. (Slovakia) Lukáš Klein (qualified)
4. (Serbia) Hamad Medjedovic (qualifying competition, lucky loser)
5. (France) Pierre-Hugues Herbert (first round)
6. (Kazakhstan) Mikhail Kukushkin (first round)
7. (Finland) Otto Virtanen (qualifying competition)
8. (Switzerland) Alexander Ritschard (first round)

=== Qualifiers ===
1. (Argentina) Andrea Collarini
2. (Czech Republic) Vít Kopřiva
3. (Slovakia) Lukáš Klein
4. (Colombia) Daniel Elahi Galán

=== Lucky losers ===
1. (Serbia) Hamad Medjedovic
2. (Brazil) Gustavo Heide

=== Qualifying draw ===
==== First qualifier ====
First round
1	(Spain) Albert Ramos Viñolas	6	4	4
WC	(Austria) Sandro Kopp	2	6	6
Alt	(Argentina) Andrea Collarini	3	6	6
6	(Kazakhstan) Mikhail Kukushkin	6	2	1

Qualifying competition
WC	(Austria) Sandro Kopp	2	0^{r}
Alt	(Argentina) Andrea Collarini	6	3

==== Second qualifier ====
First round
2	(Czech Republic) Vít Kopřiva	6	6^{3}	6
Alt	(Peru) Ignacio Buse	1	7^{7}	1
(Brazil) Gustavo Heide	6	6
8	(Switzerland) Alexander Ritschard	1	3

Qualifying competition
2	(Czech Republic) Vít Kopřiva	3	6	7
(Brazil) Gustavo Heide	6	3	5

==== Third qualifier ====
First round
3	(Slovakia) Lukáš Klein	7^{7}	6
(Ukraine) Vitaliy Sachko	6^{5}	1
(Italy) Alexander Weis	1	5
7	(Finland) Otto Virtanen	6	7

Qualifying competition
3	(Slovakia) Lukáš Klein	6	6
7	(Finland) Otto Virtanen	2	4

==== Fourth qualifier ====
First round
4	(Serbia) Hamad Medjedovic	6	6
WC	(Austria) Alexander Erler	4	1
(Colombia) Daniel Elahi Galán	7^{7}	4	6
5	(France) Pierre-Hugues Herbert	6^{2}	6	0

Qualifying competition
4	(Serbia) Hamad Medjedovic	4	6	2
(Colombia) Daniel Elahi Galán	6	2	6
