= Tennis in Italy =

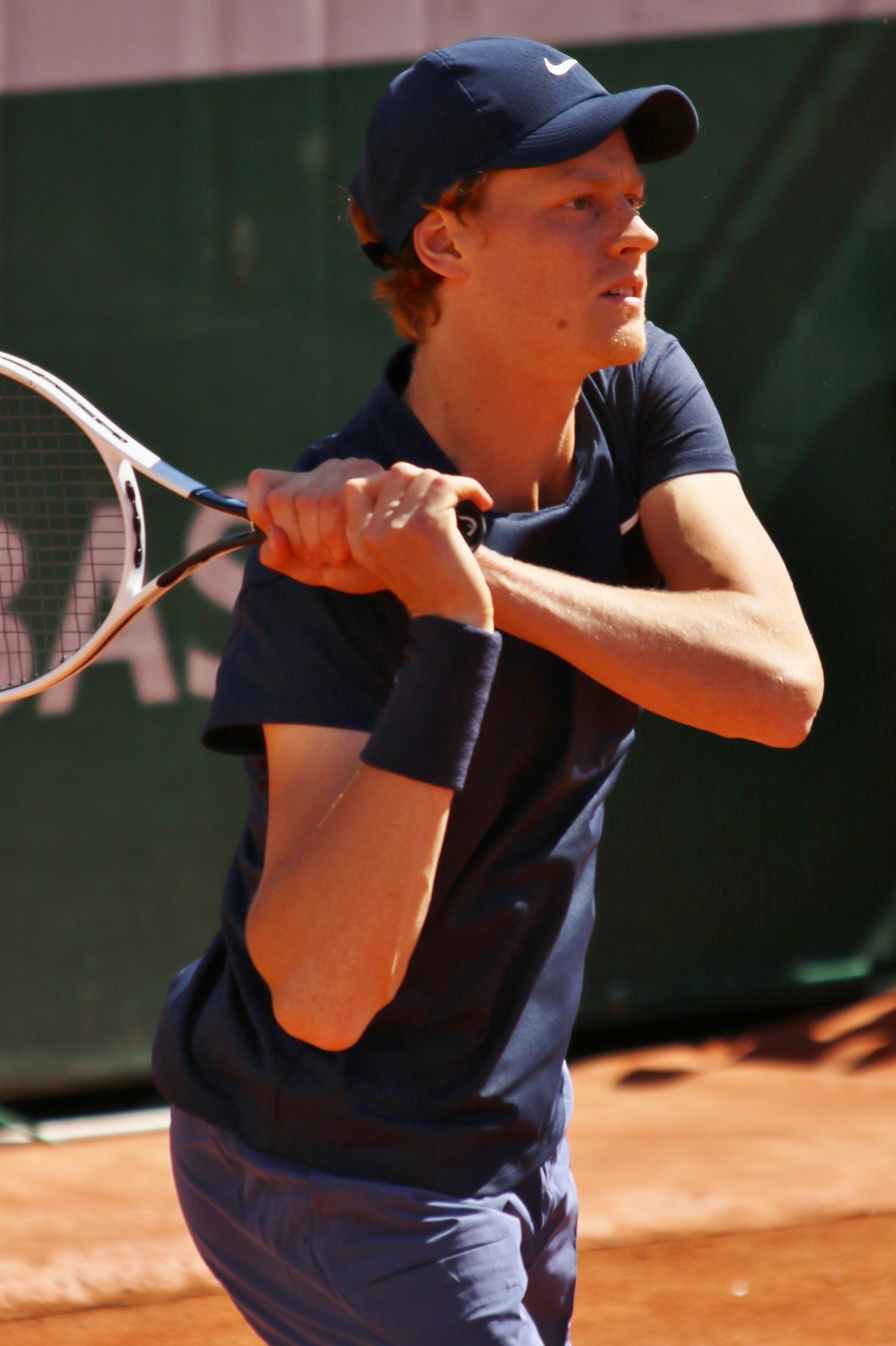
Jannik Sinner is currently the top Italian player in the ATP rankings.

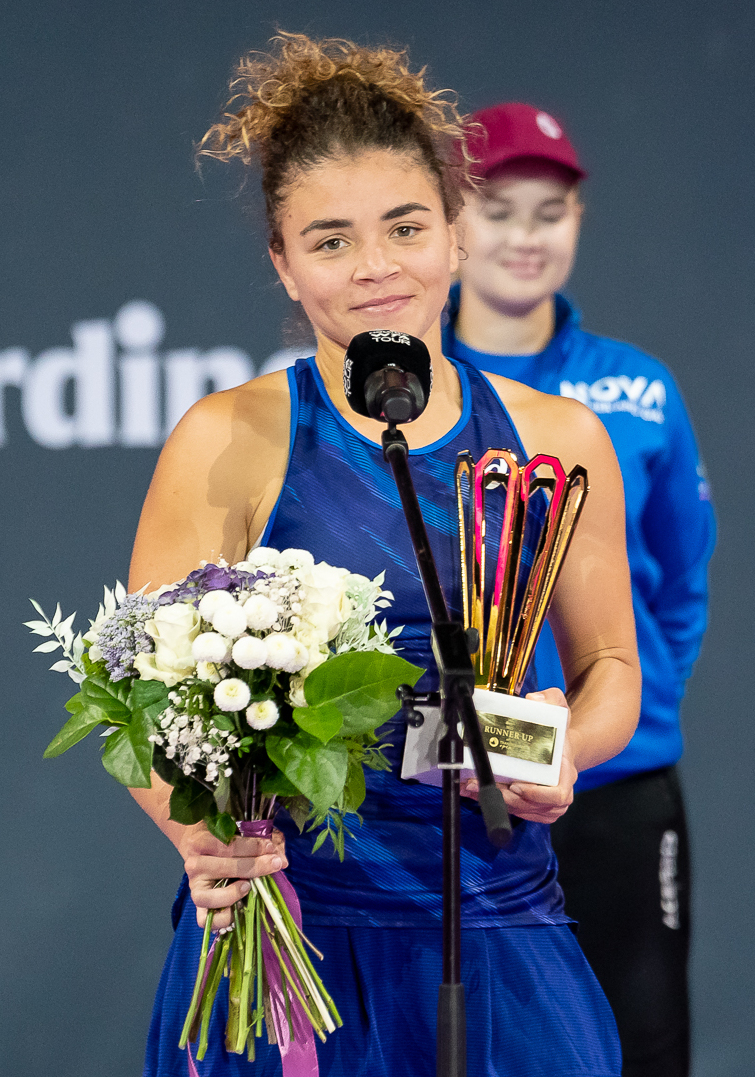
Jasmine Paolini is currently the top Italian player in the WTA rankings.

Tennis in Italy is governed by the Italian Tennis and Padel Federation and in 2012 it was the 6th sport by number of practitioners, with 1,298,000 people.

== History ==
One Italian player, Jannik Sinner, has been men's singles world No. 1 (ATP ranking).

Five Italian players have won Grand Slam tournaments: Nicola Pietrangeli (1959 and 1960 French Championships), Adriano Panatta (1976 French Open), Francesca Schiavone (2010 French Open), Flavia Pennetta (2015 US Open) and Jannik Sinner (2024 Australian Open, 2024 US Open, 2025 Australian Open, 2025 and 2026 Wimbledon).

Four Italian players have won an Olympic medal: Uberto De Morpurgo and Lorenzo Musetti won a bronze medal in the men's singles, respectively in 1924 and 2024, and the Sara Errani–Jasmine Paolini duo won a gold medal in the women's doubles, again in 2024.

The men's national team won the Davis Cup four times (1976, 2023, 2024 and 2025) and the women's national team won the Billie Jean King Cup six times (2006, 2009, 2010, 2013, 2024 and 2025).

Women's tennis in particular has seen tremendous successes in the 21st century, with the advent of Francesca Schiavone, Sara Errani, Flavia Pennetta and Roberta Vinci. All four of these women reached the top 10 of the WTA rankings in both singles and doubles (with Schiavone and Errani reaching the top 5 in singles and Pennetta, Errani and Vinci reaching No 1 in doubles), and reached Grand Slam finals in both disciplines. Schiavone and Pennetta won singles Grand Slam titles, while Pennetta, Errani and Vinci won doubles Grand Slam titles, with Errani and Vinci achieving the Career Grand Slam in doubles as a pair. They were also responsible for Italy's 4 Fed Cup victories as members of the national Fed Cup team.

== Players best singles ranking ==
In this table only those who have reached the top 20 in the world singles ranking.

Active

Updated as of 25 October 2026. Data refer to the Open Era (from 1968), then notable exlusions includes: Uberto De Morpurgo, Nicola Pietrangeli and Lea Pericoli.

=== Men ===
#	Player	Rank	Achieved	Grand Slam best	ATP titles
1	Jannik Sinner	1	10 June 2024	Win – Australian Open (2024, 2025), 2024 US Open, Wimbledon Championships (2025, 2026)	30
2	Adriano Panatta	4	24 August 1976	Win – 1976 French Open	10
3	Lorenzo Musetti	5	12 January 2025	SF – 2024 Wimbledon, 2025 French Open	3
4	Matteo Berrettini	6	31 January 2022	F – 2021 Wimbledon	10
4	Flavio Cobolli	6	24 August 2026	F – 2026 French Open	3
6	Corrado Barazzutti	7	21 August 1978	SF – 1977 US Open, 1978 French Open	5
7	Fabio Fognini	9	15 July 2019	QF – 2011 French Open	9
8	Paolo Bertolucci	12	23 August 1973	QF – 1973 French Open	6
9	Marco Cecchinato	16	25 February 2019	SF – 2018 French Open	3
9	Luciano Darderi	16	18 May 2026	4R – 2026 Australian Open	5
11	Omar Camporese	18	10 February 1992	4R – 1992 Australian Open	2
11	Andrea Gaudenzi	18	27 February 1995	4R – 1994 French Open	3
11	Andreas Seppi	18	28 January 2013	4R – 2012 French Open, 2013 Wimbledon, Australian Open (2013, 2015, 2017, 2018)	3
14	Renzo Furlan	19	15 April 1996	QF – 1995 French Open	2

=== Women ===
#	Player	Rank	Achieved	Grand Slam best	WTA titles
1	Francesca Schiavone	4	31 January 2011	Win – 2010 French Open	8
1	Jasmine Paolini	4	28 October 2024	F – 2024 French Open, 2024 Wimbledon	3
3	Sara Errani	5	20 May 2013	F – 2012 French Open	9
4	Flavia Pennetta	6	28 September 2015	Win – 2015 US Open	11
5	Roberta Vinci	7	9 May 2016	F – 2015 US Open	10
6	Silvia Farina	11	20 May 2002	QF – 2003 Wimbledon	3
7	Raffaella Reggi	13	25 April 1988	QF – 1987 French Open	5
8	Sandra Cecchini	15	14 March 1988	QF – 1985 French Open	11
9	Martina Trevisan	18	8 May 2023	SF – 2022 French Open	1

== Grand slam best results ==
=== Men's singles ===
Still active

Thirteen Italian tennis players played at least the semi-final in a Grand Slam tournament.

Player	Tournament	Result
Uberto De Morpurgo	1930 French Open	Semifinal
Giorgio De Stefani	1932 French Open	Final
Giorgio De Stefani	1934 French Open	Semifinal
Giuseppe Merlo	1955 French Open	Semifinal
Giuseppe Merlo	1956 French Open	Semifinal
Nicola Pietrangeli	1959 French Open	Win
Nicola Pietrangeli	1960 French Open	Win
Nicola Pietrangeli	1960 Wimbledon	Semifinal
Nicola Pietrangeli	1961 French Open	Final
Nicola Pietrangeli	1964 French Open	Final
Orlando Sirola	1960 French Open	Semifinal
Adriano Panatta	1973 French Open	Semifinal
Adriano Panatta	1975 French Open	Semifinal
Adriano Panatta	1976 French Open	Win
Corrado Barazzutti	1977 US Open	Semifinal
Corrado Barazzutti	1978 French Open	Semifinal
Marco Cecchinato	2018 French Open	Semifinal
Matteo Berrettini	2019 US Open	Semifinal
Matteo Berrettini	2021 Wimbledon	Final
Matteo Berrettini	2022 Australian Open	Semifinal
Jannik Sinner	2023 Wimbledon	Semifinal
Jannik Sinner	2024 Australian Open	Win
Jannik Sinner	2024 French Open	Semifinal
Jannik Sinner	2024 US Open	Win
Jannik Sinner	2025 Australian Open	Win
Jannik Sinner	2025 French Open	Final
Jannik Sinner	2025 Wimbledon	Win
Jannik Sinner	2025 US Open	Final
Jannik Sinner	2026 Australian Open	Semifinal
Jannik Sinner	2026 Wimbledon	Win
Lorenzo Musetti	2024 Wimbledon	Semifinal
Lorenzo Musetti	2025 French Open	Semifinal
Flavio Cobolli	2026 French Open	Final
Matteo Arnaldi	2026 French Open	Semifinal

=== Men's doubles ===
Still active

Eight Italian tennis players played at least the semi-final in a Grand Slam tournament.

Player	Tournament	Result
Uberto De Morpurgo	1925 Wimbledon Championships	Semifinal
Nicola Pietrangeli	1955 French Championships	Final
Nicola Pietrangeli	1956 Wimbledon Championships	Final
Nicola Pietrangeli	1957 Wimbledon Championships	Semifinal
Nicola Pietrangeli	1958 Wimbledon Championships	Semifinal
Nicola Pietrangeli	1959 French Championships	Win
Nicola Pietrangeli	1959 Wimbledon Championships	Semifinal
Orlando Sirola	1955 French Championships	Final
Orlando Sirola	1956 Wimbledon Championships	Final
Orlando Sirola	1957 Wimbledon Championships	Semifinal
Orlando Sirola	1958 Wimbledon Championships	Semifinal
Orlando Sirola	1959 French Championships	Win
Orlando Sirola	1959 Wimbledon Championships	Semifinal
Simone Bolelli	2011 US Open	Semifinal
Simone Bolelli	2013 Australian Open	Semifinal
Simone Bolelli	2015 Australian Open	Win
Simone Bolelli	2015 French Open	Semifinal
Simone Bolelli	2021 Wimbledon Championships	Semifinal
Simone Bolelli	2024 Australian Open	Final
Simone Bolelli	2024 French Open	Final
Simone Bolelli	2025 Australian Open	Final
Simone Bolelli	2026 French Open	Semifinal
Fabio Fognini	2011 US Open	Semifinal
Fabio Fognini	2013 Australian Open	Semifinal
Fabio Fognini	2015 Australian Open	Win
Fabio Fognini	2015 French Open	Semifinal
Daniele Bracciali	2012 French Open	Semifinal
Potito Starace	2012 French Open	Semifinal
Andrea Vavassori	2024 Australian Open	Final
Andrea Vavassori	2024 French Open	Final
Andrea Vavassori	2025 Australian Open	Final
Andrea Vavassori	2026 French Open	Semifinal

=== Women's singles ===
Still active

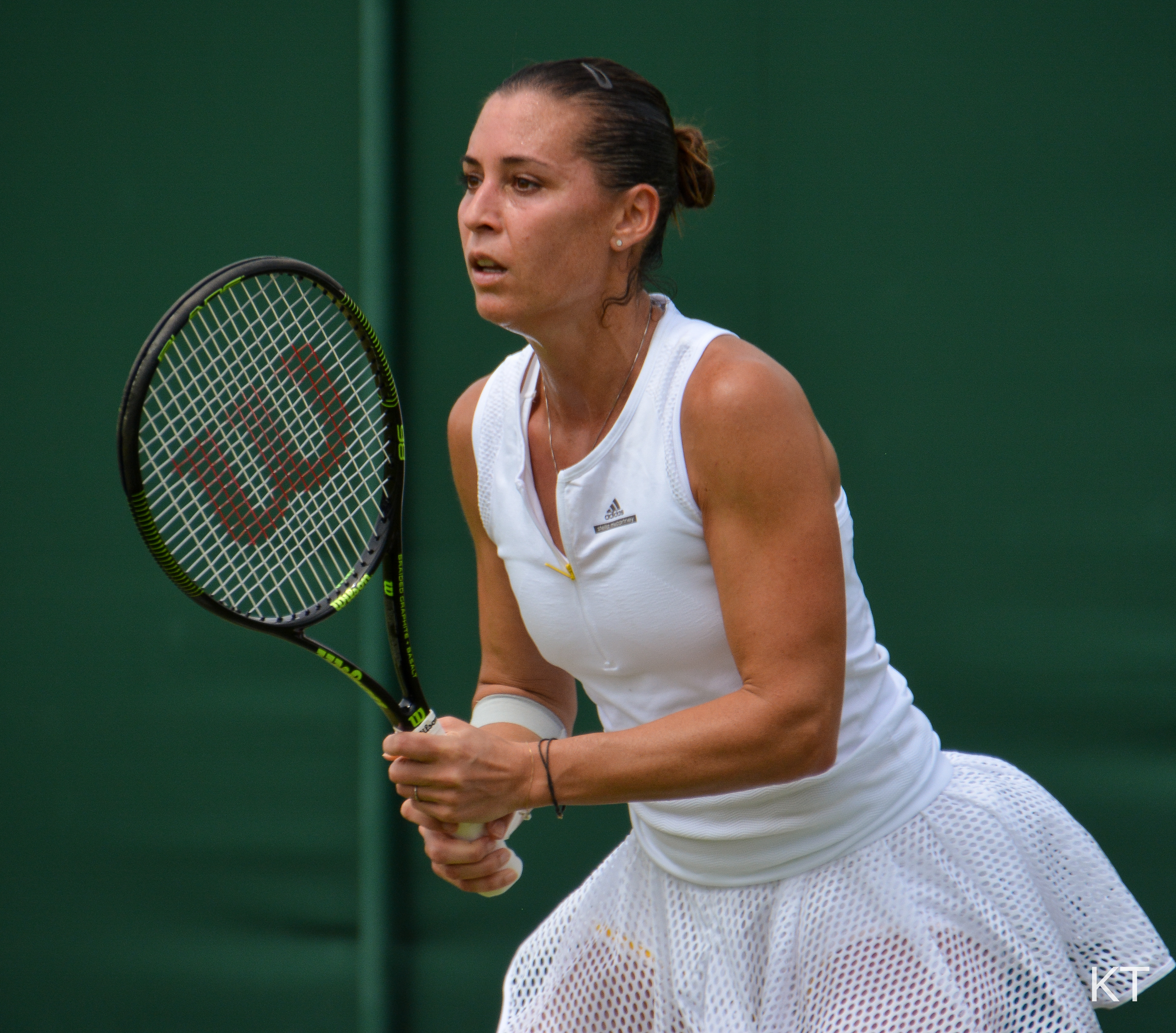
Flavia Pennetta, last Italian female winner of a Grand Slam tournament, in 2015.

Nine Italian female tennis players have reached at least the semifinals of a Grand Slam singles tournament.

Player	Tournament	Result
Maud Rosenbaum Levi	1930 U. S. National Championships	Semifinal
Annalisa Ullstein Bossi Bellani	1949 French International Championships	Semifinal
Silvana Lazzarino	1954 French International Championships	Semifinal
Francesca Schiavone	2010 French Open	Win
Francesca Schiavone	2011 French Open	Final
Sara Errani	2012 French Open	Final
Sara Errani	2012 US Open	Semifinal
Sara Errani	2013 French Open	Semifinal
Flavia Pennetta	2013 US Open	Semifinal
Flavia Pennetta	2015 US Open	Win
Roberta Vinci	2015 US Open	Final
Martina Trevisan	2022 French Open	Semifinal
Jasmine Paolini	2024 French Open	Final
Jasmine Paolini	2024 Wimbledon	Final

=== Women's doubles ===
Still active

Nine Italian tennis players played at least the semi-final in a Grand Slam tournament.

Player	Tournament	Result
Anna Maria Nasuelli	1974 French Open	Semifinal
Sabina Simmonds	1978 Australian Open	Semifinal
Daniela Marzano	1978 French Open	Semifinal
Sandra Cecchini	1993 French Open	Semifinal
Roberta Vinci	2001 US Open	Semifinal
Roberta Vinci	2004 French Open	Semifinal
Roberta Vinci	2012 Australian Open	Final
Roberta Vinci	2012 French Open	Win
Roberta Vinci	2012 US Open	Win
Roberta Vinci	2013 Australian Open	Win
Roberta Vinci	2013 French Open	Final
Roberta Vinci	2014 Australian Open	Win
Roberta Vinci	2014 French Open	Final
Roberta Vinci	2014 Wimbledon Championships	Win
Flavia Pennetta	2005 US Open	Final
Flavia Pennetta	2010 Wimbledon Championships	Semifinal
Flavia Pennetta	2011 Australian Open	Win
Flavia Pennetta	2012 Wimbledon Championships	Semifinal
Flavia Pennetta	2014 US Open	Final
Flavia Pennetta	2015 US Open	Semifinal
Francesca Schiavone	2006 US Open	Semifinal
Francesca Schiavone	2008 French Open	Final
Francesca Schiavone	2009 Australian Open	Semifinal
Francesca Schiavone	2012 Wimbledon Championships	Semifinal
Mara Santangelo	2007 French Open	Win
Mara Santangelo	2007 Wimbledon Championships	Semifinal
Mara Santangelo	2009 Australian Open	Semifinal
Sara Errani	2012 Australian Open	Final
Sara Errani	2012 French Open	Win
Sara Errani	2012 US Open	Win
Sara Errani	2013 Australian Open	Win
Sara Errani	2013 French Open	Final
Sara Errani	2014 Australian Open	Win
Sara Errani	2014 French Open	Final
Sara Errani	2014 Wimbledon Championships	Win
Sara Errani	2024 French Open	Final
Sara Errani	2025 French Open	Win
Sara Errani	2025 US Open	Semifinal
Jasmine Paolini	2024 French Open	Final
Jasmine Paolini	2025 French Open	Win
Jasmine Paolini	2025 US Open	Semifinal

== All tournament winners in Open Era ==
=== Men's singles ===
As of 25 October 2026, 118 tournaments have been won by 29 Italian tennis players in the major circuit.

Still active

Titles	Players
30	Jannik Sinner
10	Matteo Berrettini
10	Adriano Panatta
9	Fabio Fognini
6	Paolo Bertolucci
5	Corrado Barazzutti
5	Luciano Darderi
4	Lorenzo Sonego
3	Paolo Canè
3	Marco Cecchinato
3	Flavio Cobolli
3	Andrea Gaudenzi
3	Lorenzo Musetti
3	Andreas Seppi

Titles	Players
2	Omar Camporese
2	Francesco Cancellotti
2	Renzo Furlan
2	Stefano Pescosolido
2	Davide Sanguinetti
2	Filippo Volandri

Titles	Players
1	Daniele Bracciali
1	Simone Colombo
1	Paolo Lorenzi
1	Massimiliano Narducci
1	Gianni Ocleppo
1	Claudio Panatta
1	Claudio Pistolesi
1	Gianluca Pozzi
1	Tonino Zugarelli

=== Women's singles ===
As of 17 January 2026, 80 tournaments have been won by 21 Italian tennis players in the major circuit.

Still active

Titles	Players
11	Sandra Cecchini
11	Flavia Pennetta
10	Roberta Vinci
9	Sara Errani
8	Francesca Schiavone
5	Raffaella Reggi
4	Camila Giorgi
3	Silvia Farina Elia
3	Rita Grande
3	Jasmine Paolini
2	Elisabetta Cocciaretto
2	Karin Knapp

Titles	Players
1	Lucia Bronzetti
1	Federica Bonsignori
1	Alberta Brianti
1	Tathiana Garbin
1	Marzia Grossi
1	Katia Piccolini
1	Gloria Pizzichini
1	Mara Santangelo
1	Martina Trevisan

=== Men's doubles ===
As of 17 May 2026, 92 tournaments have been won by 37 Italian tennis players in the major circuit.

Still active

Titles	Players
21	Simone Bolelli
18	Adriano Panatta
13	Andrea Vavassori
12	Paolo Bertolucci
8	Fabio Fognini
6	Daniele Bracciali
6	Claudio Panatta
6	Potito Starace
5	Omar Camporese
5	Simone Colombo
5	Diego Nargiso
3	Paolo Canè
3	Lorenzo Sonego
2	Enzo Artoni
2	Matteo Berrettini
2	Massimo Bertolini
2	Cristian Brandi
2	Andrea Gaudenzi
2	Gianni Ocleppo

Titles	Players
1	Corrado Barazzutti
1	Flavio Cipolla
1	Giorgio Galimberti
1	Paolo Lorenzi
1	Gianni Marchetti
1	Filippo Messori
1	Federico Mordegan
1	Lorenzo Musetti
1	Andrea Pellegrino
1	Stefano Pescosolido
1	Gianluca Pozzi
1	Davide Sanguinetti
1	Vincenzo Santopadre
1	Andreas Seppi
1	Jannik Sinner
1	Laurence Tieleman
1	Enzo Vattuone
1	Tonino Zugarelli

=== Women's doubles ===
As of 5 October 2025, 129 tournaments have been won by 21 Italian tennis players in the major circuit.

Still active

Titles	Players
36	Sara Errani
25	Roberta Vinci
17	Flavia Pennetta
11	Sandra Cecchini
11	Tathiana Garbin
10	Jasmine Paolini
9	Silvia Farina Elia
9	Mara Santangelo
7	Francesca Schiavone
6	Laura Golarsa

Titles	Players
5	Laura Garrone
5	Rita Grande
4	Raffaella Reggi
3	Maria Elena Camerin
3	Giulia Casoni
3	Adriana Serra Zanetti
2	Alberta Brianti
2	Antonella Serra Zanetti
1	Linda Ferrando
1	Lea Pericoli
1	Emily Stellato

== Italian wins against the Current World's Number 1 ==
=== Male ===
Nine Italian tennis players managed to beat the current number 1 in the world.

#	Date	Player	Tournament	Tier	Surface	Current World's N.1	Score
1	17 May 1974	Corrado Barazzutti	Munich, West Germany	250 series	Clay	(Romania) Ilie Năstase	6–3, 6–7, 6–1
2	9 November 1975	Adriano Panatta	Stockholm, Sweden	Masters 1000	Carpet	(United States) Jimmy Connors	4–6, 6–3, 7–5
3	18 April 1977	Adriano Panatta	Houston, United States	250 series	Clay	(United States) Jimmy Connors	6–1, 7–5
4	15 June 2000	Gianluca Pozzi	Queen's, Great Britain	250 series	Grass	(United States) Andre Agassi	4–6, 3–2 ret.
5	10 May 2007	Filippo Volandri	Rome, Italy	Masters 1000	Clay	(Switzerland) Roger Federer	6–3, 6–4
6	16 May 2017	Fabio Fognini	Rome, Italy	Masters 1000	Clay	(United Kingdom) Andy Murray	6–2, 6–4
7	30 October 2020	Lorenzo Sonego	Vienna, Austria	500 series	Hard (i)	(Serbia) Novak Djokovic	6–2, 6–1
8	31 March 2023	Jannik Sinner	Miami, United States	Masters 1000	Hard	(Spain) Carlos Alcaraz	6–7^{(4–7)}, 6–4, 6–2
9	13 April 2023	Lorenzo Musetti	Monte-Carlo, Monaco	Masters 1000	Clay	(Serbia) Novak Djokovic	4–6, 7–5, 6–4
10	14 November 2023	Jannik Sinner	Turin, Italy	ATP Finals	Hard (i)	(Serbia) Novak Djokovic	7–5, 6–7^{(5–7)}, 7–6^{(7–2)}
11	25 November 2023	Jannik Sinner	Malaga, Spain	Davis Cup	Hard (i)	(Serbia) Novak Djokovic	6–2, 2–6, 7–5
12	26 January 2024	Jannik Sinner	Melbourne, Australia	Grand Slam	Hard	(Serbia) Novak Djokovic	6–1, 6–2, 6–7^{(6–8)}, 6–3
13	11 March 2024	Luca Nardi	Indian Wells, United States	Masters 1000	Hard	(Serbia) Novak Djokovic	6–4, 3–6, 6–3
14	16 November 2025	Jannik Sinner	Turin, Italy	ATP Finals	Hard (i)	(Spain) Carlos Alcaraz	7–6^{(7–4)}, 7–5
15	14 April 2026	Jannik Sinner	Monte-Carlo, France	Masters 1000	Clay	(Spain) Carlos Alcaraz	7–6^{(7–5)}, 6–3

=== Female ===
Four Italian tennis players managed to beat the current number 1 in the world.

#	Date	Player	Tournament	Tier	Surface	Current World's N.1	Score
1	26 May 2004	Tathiana Garbin	Paris, France	Grand Slam	Clay	(Belgium) Justine Henin	7–5, 6–4
2	23 April 2006	Francesca Schiavone	Nancy, France	Billie Jean King Cup	Clay	(France) Amélie Mauresmo	4–6, 7–6^{(7–4)}, 6–4
3	28 February 2008	Francesca Schiavone	Dubai, United Arab Emirates	Tier II Series	Hard	(Belgium) Justine Henin	7–6^{(7–3)}, 7–6^{(7–4)}
4	16 October 2008	Flavia Pennetta	Zurich, Switzerland	Tier II Series	Hard (i)	(Serbia) Jelena Janković	5–7, 6–3, 6–3
5	10 August 2011	Roberta Vinci	Toronto, Canada	Premier 5	Hard	(Denmark) Caroline Wozniacki	6–4, 7–5
6	7 October 2011	Flavia Pennetta	Beijing, China	Premier Mandatory	Hard (i)	(Denmark) Caroline Wozniacki	3–6, 6–0, 7–6^{(7–2)}
7	11 September 2015	Roberta Vinci	New York, United States	Grand Slam	Hard	(United States) Serena Williams	2–6, 6–4, 6–4

== All-Italian finals in Open Era ==
=== Male ===
There were seven all-Italian finals in Open Era in the ATP Tour.

#	Date	Tournament	Venue	Tier	Surface	Winner	Runner-up	Result
1	May 1974	Florence Open	(Italy) Florence	C events	Clay	Adriano Panatta	Paolo Bertolucci	6–4, 6–1
2	July 1976	Swedish Open	(Sweden) Båstad	Three-star events	Clay	Tonino Zugarelli	Corrado Barazzutti	4–6, 7–5, 6–2
3	March 1980	Cairo Open	(Egypt) Cairo	Grand Prix	Clay	Corrado Barazzutti	Paolo Bertolucci	4–6, 7–5, 6–2
4	April 1987	Hypo Group Tennis International	(Italy) Bari	Grand Prix	Clay	Claudio Pistolesi	Francesco Cancellotti	6–7, 7–5, 6–3
5	May 1988	Florence Open	(Italy) Florence	Grand Prix	Clay	Massimiliano Narducci	Claudio Panatta	3–6. 6–1, 6–4
6	Feb 2021	Great Ocean Road Open	(Australia) Melbourne	250 Series	Hard	Jannik Sinner	Stefano Travaglia	7–6^{(7–4)}, 6–4
7	Oct 2022	Tennis Napoli Cup	(Italy) Naples	250 Series	Hard	Lorenzo Musetti	Matteo Berrettini	7–6^{(7–5)}, 6–2

=== Female ===
#	Date	Tournament	Venue	Tier	Surface	Winner	Runner-up	Result
1	May 1985	Spanish Open	(Spain) Barcelona	WTA $50,000	Clay	Sandra Cecchini	Raffaella Reggi	6–3, 6–4
2	July 1990	Estoril Open	(Portugal) Oeiras	WTA Tier V	Clay	Federica Bonsignori	Laura Garrone	2–6, 6–3, 6–3
3	July 1991	San Marino Open	City of San Marino	WTA Tier V	Clay	Katia Piccolini	Silvia Farina	6–2, 6–3
4	March 2003	Morocco Open	(Morocco) Casablanca	WTA Tier V	Clay	Rita Grande	Antonella Serra Zanetti	6–2, 4–6, 6–1
5	February 2007	Copa Colsanitas	(Colombia) Bogotá	WTA Tier III	Clay	Roberta Vinci	Tathiana Garbin	6–7^{(5–7)}, 6–4, 0–3 ret.
6	July 2009	Internazionali Femminili di Palermo	(Italy) Palermo	WTA International	Clay	Flavia Pennetta	Sara Errani	6–1, 6–2
7	April 2010	Barcelona Ladies Open	(Spain) Barcelona	WTA International	Clay	Francesca Schiavone	Roberta Vinci	6–1, 6–1
8	February 2012	Abierto Mexicano Telcel	(Mexico) Acapulco	WTA International	Clay	Sara Errani	Flavia Pennetta	5–7, 7–6^{(7–2)}, 6–0
9	July 2013	Internazionali Femminili di Palermo	(Italy) Palermo	WTA International	Clay	Roberta Vinci	Sara Errani	6–3, 3–6, 6–3
10	May 2015	Nürnberger Cup	(Germany) Nürnberg	WTA International	Clay	Karin Knapp	Roberta Vinci	7–6^{(7–5)}, 4–6, 6–1
11	September 2015	US Open	(United States) New York City	Grand Slam	Hard	Flavia Pennetta	Roberta Vinci	7-6, 6–2

== See also ==
- ATP Tour records
- Sport in Italy
- Italy Davis Cup team
- Italy Billie Jean King Cup team
- Italian Tennis and Padel Federation
