= 2024 Generali Open Kitzbühel – Doubles =

Doubles
- 2024 Generali Open Kitzbühel

Final
- Champions: (Austria) Alexander Erler (Germany) Andreas Mies
- Runners-up: (Germany) Constantin Frantzen (Germany) Hendrik Jebens
- Score: 6–3, 3–6, [10–6]

Events
Singles	Doubles
- Generali Open Kitzbühel

Alexander Erler and Andreas Mies won the doubles title at the 2024 Generali Open Kitzbühel, defeating Constantin Frantzen and Hendrik Jebens in the final, 6–3, 3–6, [10–6]. It was Erler's sixth ATP Tour doubles title (and his third in Kitzbühel), and Mies' seventh.

Erler and Lucas Miedler were the reigning champions, but Miedler withdrew before the tournament began.

== Seeds ==
1. (United Kingdom) Jamie Murray / (Czech Republic) Adam Pavlásek (quarterfinals)
2. (Mexico) Santiago González / (Tunisia) Skander Mansouri (semifinals)
3. (Netherlands) Robin Haase / (Netherlands) Jean-Julien Rojer (quarterfinals)
4. (Ecuador) Gonzalo Escobar / (Kazakhstan) Aleksandr Nedovyesov (quarterfinals)
5. (Germany) Constantin Frantzen / (Germany) Hendrik Jebens (final)
6. (Austria) Alexander Erler / (Germany) Andreas Mies (champions)
7. (United Kingdom) Lloyd Glasspool / (Netherlands) Matwé Middelkoop (semifinals)
8. (Monaco) Romain Arneodo / (Austria) Sam Weissborn (quarterfinals)

== Draw ==
Key

- Q = Qualifier
- WC = Wild card
- LL = Lucky loser
- Alt = Alternate
- ITF = ITF entry
- PR = Protected ranking
- SR = Special ranking
- SE = Special exempt
- JE = Junior exempt
- JR = Junior Accelerator Programme entrant
- CO = College Accelerator Programme entrant
- NG = Next Gen Accelerator Program entrant
- w/o = Walkover
- r = Retired
- d = Defaulted

=== Draw ===
First round
1	(United Kingdom) J Murray (Czech Republic) A Pavlásek	6	6
(Bolivia) B Arias (Bolivia) F Zeballos	3	4
WC	(Germany) D Altmaier (Austria) D Thiem	7^{7}	4	[2]
6	(Austria) A Erler (Germany) A Mies	6^{5}	6	[10]
3	(Netherlands) R Haase (Netherlands) J-J Rojer	6	6
(Spain) S Martos Gornés (Spain) J Munar	1	4
P Kotov (Spain) P Martínez	3	5
7	(United Kingdom) L Glasspool (Netherlands) M Middelkoop	6	7
5	(Germany) C Frantzen (Germany) H Jebens	6	3	[10]
(Argentina) F Coria (Colombia) DE Galán	1	6	[7]
Alt	(Serbia) I Sabanov (Serbia) M Sabanov	3	3
4	(Ecuador) G Escobar (Kazakhstan) A Nedovyesov	6	6
8	(Monaco) R Arneodo (Austria) S Weissborn	3	6	[13]
WC	(Austria) P Oswald (Austria) J Schwärzler	6	2	[11]
(Czech Republic) P Nouza (Czech Republic) P Rikl	3	4
2	(Mexico) S González (Tunisia) S Mansouri	6	6

Quarterfinals
1	(United Kingdom) J Murray (Czech Republic) A Pavlásek	7	6^{7}	[9]
6	(Austria) A Erler (Germany) A Mies	5	7^{9}	[11]
3	(Netherlands) R Haase (Netherlands) J-J Rojer	4	3
7	(United Kingdom) L Glasspool (Netherlands) M Middelkoop	6	6
5	(Germany) C Frantzen (Germany) H Jebens	6	6
4	(Ecuador) G Escobar (Kazakhstan) A Nedovyesov	4	3
8	(Monaco) R Arneodo (Austria) S Weissborn	3	7	[4]
2	(Mexico) S González (Tunisia) S Mansouri	6	5	[10]

Semifinals
6	(Austria) A Erler (Germany) A Mies	6	3	[10]
7	(United Kingdom) L Glasspool (Netherlands) M Middelkoop	1	6	[7]
5	(Germany) C Frantzen (Germany) H Jebens	6^{5}	6	[10]
2	(Mexico) S González (Tunisia) S Mansouri	7^{7}	3	[7]

Final
6	(Austria) A Erler (Germany) A Mies	6	3	[10]
5	(Germany) C Frantzen (Germany) H Jebens	3	6	[6]
