= 2024 Generali Open Kitzbühel =

- Date: 22–27 July
- Edition: 80th
- Category: ATP 250 series
- Surface: Clay / Outdoor
- Location: Kitzbühel, Austria
- Venue: Tennis stadium Kitzbühel

Champions

Singles
- (Italy) Matteo Berrettini

Doubles
- (Austria) Alexander Erler / (Germany) Andreas Mies
- Generali Open Kitzbühel

The 2024 Generali Open Kitzbühel was a tennis tournament played on outdoor clay courts. It was the 80th edition of the tournament and part of the ATP 250 tournaments on the 2024 ATP Tour. It took place at the Tennis stadium Kitzbühel in Kitzbühel, Austria, from 22 through 27 July 2024.

== Champions ==
=== Singles ===
- (Italy) Matteo Berrettini def. (France) Hugo Gaston, 7–5, 6–3

=== Doubles ===
- (Austria) Alexander Erler / (Germany) Andreas Mies def. (Germany) Constantin Frantzen / (Germany) Hendrik Jebens, 6–3, 3–6, [10–6]

== Singles main draw entrants ==
=== Seeds ===
Country	Player	Rank^{1}	Seed
ARG	Sebastián Báez	19	1
CHI	Alejandro Tabilo	20	2
~~ARG~~	~~Tomás Martín Etcheverry~~	~~32~~	~~3~~
ESP	Pedro Martínez	49	4
AUT	Sebastian Ofner	50	5
~~POR~~	~~Nuno Borges~~	~~51~~	~~6~~
ESP	Roberto Carballés Baena	54	7
SRB	Laslo Djere	57	8

- ^{1} Rankings are as of 15 July 2024.

=== Other entrants ===
The following players received wildcards into the main draw:

- (Austria) Lukas Neumayer
- (United States) Nicolas Moreno de Alboran
- (Austria) Joel Schwärzler

The following player received entry as an emergency substitution:

- (Austria) Dominic Thiem

The following player received entry as a special exempt:

- (Argentina) Thiago Agustín Tirante

The following players received entry from the qualifying draw:

- (Argentina) Andrea Collarini
- (Colombia) Daniel Elahi Galán
- (Slovakia) Lukáš Klein
- (Czech Republic) Vít Kopřiva

The following players received entry as lucky losers:

- (Brazil) Gustavo Heide
- (Serbia) Hamad Medjedovic

=== Withdrawals ===
- (Portugal) Nuno Borges → replaced by (Serbia) Hamad Medjedovic
- (Argentina) Tomás Martín Etcheverry → replaced by (Brazil) Gustavo Heide
- (Chile) Nicolás Jarry → replaced by (Brazil) Thiago Seyboth Wild
- (Norway) Casper Ruud → replaced by (Austria) Dominic Thiem

== Doubles main draw entrants ==
=== Seeds ===
Country	Player	Country	Player	Rank^{1}	Seed
GBR	Jamie Murray	CZE	Adam Pavlásek	78	1
MEX	Santiago González	TUN	Skander Mansouri	78	2
NED	Robin Haase	NED	Jean-Julien Rojer	85	3
ECU	Gonzalo Escobar	KAZ	Aleksandr Nedovyesov	97	4
GER	Constantin Frantzen	GER	Hendrik Jebens	105	5
AUT	Alexander Erler	GER	Andreas Mies	106	6
GBR	Lloyd Glasspool	NED	Matwé Middelkoop	111	7
MON	Romain Arneodo	AUT	Sam Weissborn	151	8

- ^{1} Rankings as of 15 July 2024.

=== Other entrants ===
The following pairs received wildcards into the doubles main draw:

- (Germany) Daniel Altmaier / (Austria) Dominic Thiem
- (Austria) Philipp Oswald / (Austria) Joel Schwärzler

The following pair received entry as alternates:

- (Serbia) Ivan Sabanov / (Serbia) Matej Sabanov

=== Withdrawals ===
- (Germany) Andre Begemann / (Romania) Victor Vlad Cornea → replaced by (Serbia) Ivan Sabanov / (Serbia) Matej Sabanov
- (Austria) Alexander Erler / (Austria) Lucas Miedler → replaced by (Austria) Alexander Erler / (Germany) Andreas Mies
- (Germany) Yannick Hanfmann / (Germany) Andreas Mies → replaced by (Czech Republic) Petr Nouza / (Czech Republic) Patrik Rikl
- (Chile) Nicolás Jarry / (Chile) Alejandro Tabilo → replaced by (Bolivia) Boris Arias / (Bolivia) Federico Zeballos
