= Italian Tennis and Padel Federation =

National governing body of tennis in Italy

Federazione Italiana Tennis e Padel
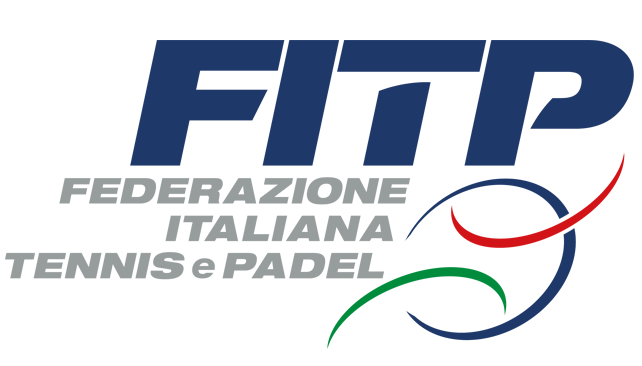
- Sport: Tennis
- Jurisdiction: Italy
- Abbreviation: FITP
- Founded: 1910
- Affiliation: International Tennis Federation (ITF)
- Regional affiliation: Europe (TE)
- Headquarters: Rome
- President: Angelo Binaghi

Official website
- fitp.it
- (Italy)

Old FIT logo used until 2022

The Italian Tennis and Padel Federation (Italian: Federazione Italiana Tennis e Padel, FITP since 2023; formerly Italian: Federazione Italiana Tennis, FIT) is the national governing body for the tennis sport in Italy.

== History ==
The FITP, originally Federazione Italiana Lawn Tennis (FILT), was born in Florence in 1910 with just 26 affiliated clubs.

In 2022, the FIT decided to extend its activities to padel, beach tennis, and pickleball, as of January 2023.

=== Davis and Fed Cup ===
Tournament	Wins	Teams	Non-playing captain
Davis Cup	1976	Adriano Panatta; Corrado Barazzutti; Paolo Bertolucci; Tonino Zugarelli	Nicola Pietrangeli
Davis Cup	2023	Jannik Sinner; Lorenzo Musetti; Lorenzo Sonego; Matteo Arnaldi; Simone Bolelli	Filippo Volandri
Davis Cup	2024	Jannik Sinner; Lorenzo Musetti; Matteo Berrettini; Andrea Vavassori; Simone Bolelli	Filippo Volandri
Davis Cup	2025	Flavio Cobolli; Lorenzo Sonego; Matteo Berrettini; Andrea Vavassori; Simone Bolelli	Filippo Volandri
Fed Cup	2006, 2009, 2010, 2013	Francesca Schiavone; Flavia Pennetta; Sara Errani; Roberta Vinci	Corrado Barazzutti

=== ATP Cup ===
Tournament	Runner-up	Team	Non-playing captain
ATP Cup	2021	Matteo Berrettini; Fabio Fognini; Simone Bolelli; Andrea Vavassori	Vincenzo Santopadre

=== United Cup ===
Tournament	Runner-up	Team	Non-playing captain
United Cup	2023	Matteo Berrettini; Martina Trevisan; Lorenzo Musetti; Lucia Bronzetti; Andrea Vavassori; Camilla Rosatello; Marco Bortolotti	Vincenzo Santopadre

== Presidents ==
Here are the 110 years of presidents of the Italian Tennis Federation.

- 1910: Marquess Piero Antinori
- 1913 - 1927: Beppe Croce
- 1928: Augusto Turati
- 1929 - 1938: Alessandro Lessona
- 1939: Attilio Fontan
- 1940 - 1941: Erberto Vasellia
- 1943: Giorgio de' Stefani (Regent Presidential Committee)
- 1944: Riccardo Sabbadini (Regent CONI)
- 1949 - 1956: Aldo Tolusso
- 1958 - 1969: Giorgio de' Stefani
- 1969 - 1973: Luigi Orsini
- 1973 - 1976: Giorgio Neri
- 1976 - 1988: Paolo Galgani
- 1988 - 1989: Mario Pescante (Commissary)
- 1989 - 1998: Paolo Galgani
- 1998 - 2000: Francesco Ricci Bitti
- 2000: Gianguido Sacchi Morsiani (Commissary)
- 2000: Luigi Tronchetti Provera (Commissary)
- from 2001: Angelo Binaghi

== Broadcast ==
The federation also has a satellite television channel, SuperTennis.

== See also ==
- Tennis in Italy
- Italy Davis Cup team
- Italy Fed Cup team
