= 2018 Swiss Open Gstaad – Doubles =

Doubles
- 2018 Swiss Open Gstaad

Final
- Champions: (Italy) Matteo Berrettini (Italy) Daniele Bracciali
- Runners-up: (Ukraine) Denys Molchanov (Slovakia) Igor Zelenay
- Score: 7–6^{(7–2)}, 7–6^{(7–5)}

Events
| Singles | Doubles |
| ← 2017 · | Swiss Open Gstaad | · 2019 → |

Oliver Marach and Philipp Oswald were the defending champions, but they chose to compete alongside different partners in Hamburg instead.

Matteo Berrettini and Daniele Bracciali won the title, defeating Denys Molchanov and Igor Zelenay in the final, 7–6^{(7–2)}, 7–6^{(7–5)}.

== Seeds ==
1. (Netherlands) Robin Haase / (Netherlands) Matwé Middelkoop (semifinals)
2. (Mexico) Santiago González / (Portugal) João Sousa (semifinals)
3. (Czech Republic) Roman Jebavý / (Argentina) Andrés Molteni (first round)
4. (Netherlands) Sander Arends / (Croatia) Antonio Šančić (first round)

== Draw ==
=== Key ===
- Q = Qualifier
- WC = Wild card
- LL = Lucky loser
- Alt = Alternate
- SE = Special exempt
- PR = Protected ranking
- ITF = ITF entry
- JE = Junior exempt
- w/o = Walkover
- r = Retired
- d = Defaulted
- SR = Special ranking

=== Draw ===
First round
1 | (Netherlands) R Haase (Netherlands) M Middelkoop | 5 | 6 | [12]
(Moldova) R Albot (Belarus) A Vasilevski | 7 | 4 | [10]
WC | (Switzerland) M-A Hüsler (Switzerland) L Margaroli | 4 | 4
WC | (Switzerland) A Bodmer (Switzerland) J Paul | 6 | 6
4 | (Netherlands) S Arends (Croatia) A Šančić | 4 | 5
PR | (Italy) M Berrettini (Italy) D Bracciali | 6 | 7
(Germany) K Krawietz (Germany) A Mies | 6^{4} | 4
(France) J Eysseric (France) H Nys | 7^{7} | 6
(India) S Balaji (India) V Vardhan | 7^{9} | 3 | [9]
Alt | (Argentina) G Andreozzi (Spain) J Munar | 6^{7} | 6 | [11]
(Ukraine) D Molchanov (Slovakia) I Zelenay | 6 | 3 | [10]
3 | (Czech Republic) R Jebavý (Argentina) A Molteni | 3 | 6 | [8]
(Uruguay) A Behar (Spain) G García López | 4 | 3
(Spain) R Carballés Baena (Japan) T Daniel | 6 | 6
(United States) A Krajicek (India) J Nedunchezhiyan | 1 | 0
2 | (Mexico) S González (Portugal) J Sousa | 6 | 6

Quarterfinals
1 | (Netherlands) R Haase (Netherlands) M Middelkoop | 6 | 6
WC | (Switzerland) A Bodmer (Switzerland) J Paul | 4 | 2
PR | (Italy) M Berrettini (Italy) D Bracciali | 6 | 6
(France) J Eysseric (France) H Nys | 4 | 3
Alt | (Argentina) G Andreozzi (Spain) J Munar | 6 | 5 | [7]
(Ukraine) D Molchanov (Slovakia) I Zelenay | 4 | 7 | [10]
(Spain) R Carballés Baena (Japan) T Daniel | 2 | 6^{2}
2 | (Mexico) S González (Portugal) J Sousa | 6 | 7^{7}

Semifinals
1 | (Netherlands) R Haase (Netherlands) M Middelkoop | 6^{3} | 7^{7} | [7]
PR | (Italy) M Berrettini (Italy) D Bracciali | 7^{7} | 6^{5} | [10]
(Ukraine) D Molchanov (Slovakia) I Zelenay | 6 | 6
2 | (Mexico) S González (Portugal) J Sousa | 4 | 4

Final
PR | (Italy) M Berrettini (Italy) D Bracciali | 7^{7} | 7^{7}
(Ukraine) D Molchanov (Slovakia) I Zelenay | 6^{2} | 6^{5}
