= Adrian Bodmer =

Swiss tennis player

- Country (sports): Switzerland
- Born: 6 March 1995 (age 30) Wil, Switzerland
- Height: 1.80 m (5 ft 11 in)
- Plays: Right-handed (one-handed backhand)
- Coach: Joachim Kretz; Francesco Ceriani
- Prize money: US $60,208

Singles
- Career record: 0–2 (at ATP Tour level, Grand Slam level, and in Davis Cup)
- Career titles: 0
- Highest ranking: No. 455 (7 May 2018)

Doubles
- Career record: 1–2 (at ATP Tour level, Grand Slam level, and in Davis Cup)
- Career titles: 0
- Highest ranking: No. 292 (9 April 2018)

Adrian Bodmer (born 6 March 1995) is a Swiss tennis player. He has a career high ATP singles ranking of World No. 455 achieved on 7 May 2018 and a career high doubles ranking of No. 292 achieved on 9 April 2018.

Bodmer represents Switzerland at the Davis Cup, where he has a W/L record of 0–1.

== Career ==
He made his ATP Tour main draw debut at the 2018 Swiss Open where he, alongside compatriot Jakub Paul, was given a wildcard entry into the doubles draw. A fortunate draw saw them matched up again another Swiss-paired wildcard entry in Marc-Andrea Hüsler and Luca Margaroli in the first round, and they took advantage of the opportunity by defeating them in straight sets 6–4, 6–4. They were defeated in the second round by top seeded Dutch duo Robin Haase and Matwé Middelkoop in straight sets 4–6, 2–6.

== ITF Futures/World Tennis Tour finals ==
=== Singles: 5 (3 titles, 2 runner-ups) ===
Legend ITF Futures/WTT (3–2)	Finals by surface Hard (1–0) Clay (2–1) Grass (0–0) Carpet (0–0)

Result	W–L	Date	Tournament	Tier	Surface	Opponent	Score
Win	1–0	May 2017	Italy F11, Santa Margherita di Pula	Futures	Clay	(Australia) Marc Polmans	6–3, 6–2
Win	2–0	Aug 2017	Germany F12, Ueberlingen	Futures	Clay	(Germany) Louis Wessels	7–6^{(7–5)}, 6–3
Loss	2–1	Apr 2018	Italy F9, Santa Margherita di Pula	Futures	Clay	(Argentina) Hernán Casanova	3–6, 3–6
Win	3–1	Mar 2024	M15 Heraklion, Greece	WTT	Hard	(Australia) Jacob Bradshaw	6–3, 7–6^{(7–4)}
Loss	3–2	Oct 2024	M15 Heraklion, Greece	WTT	Hard	(United States) Cannon Kingsley	3–6, 6–7^{(4–7)}

=== Doubles: 23 (12 titles, 11 runner-ups) ===
Legend ITF Futures/WTT (12–11)	Finals by surface Hard (6–7) Clay (6–3) Grass (0–0) Carpet (0–1)

Result	W–L	Date	Tournament	Tier	Surface	Partner	Opponents	Score
Loss	0–1	Apr 2012	Switzerland F3, Fällanden	Futures	Carpet (i)	(Austria) Philipp Oswald	(New Zealand) Marcus Daniell (Hungary) Márton Fucsovics	7–6^{(7–3)}, 3–6, [8–10]
Loss	0–2	Nov 2014	Turkey F42, Antalya	Futures	Hard	(Switzerland) Antoine Bellier	(Austria) Lucas Miedler (Austria) Tristan-Samuel Weissborn	5–7, 1–6
Win	1–2	Nov 2016	Greece F8, Heraklion	Futures	Hard	(Germany) Jakob Sude	(France) Alexandre Müller (France) Florent Diep	6–2, 6–1
Loss	1–3	Jan 2017	Egypt F1, Sharm El Sheikh	Futures	Hard	(Germany) Jakob Sude	(France) Alexandre Müller (France) Antoine Escoffier	2–6, 6–3, [9–11]
Loss	1–4	Apr 2017	Italy F7, Santa Margherita di Pula	Futures	Clay	(Germany) Jakob Sude	(United States) Rhyne Williams (Netherlands) Mark Vervoort	4–6, 4–6
Win	2–4	Apr 2017	Italy F8, Santa Margherita di Pula	Futures	Clay	(Germany) Jakob Sude	(United States) Rhyne Williams (Argentina) Andrea Collarini	7–6^{(7–5)}, 4–6, [10–1]
Win	3–4	Apr 2017	Italy F10, Santa Margherita di Pula	Futures	Clay	(Germany) Jakob Sude	(Poland) Mateusz Kowalczyk (Poland) Grzegorz Panfil	4–6, 7–6^{(9–7)}, [10–5]
Win	4–4	May 2017	Italy F11, Santa Margherita di Pula	Futures	Clay	(Germany) Jakob Sude	(Argentina) Federico Juan Aguilar (Argentina) Juan Pablo Ficovich	6–3, 6–3
Loss	4–5	Jul 2017	Austria F2, Kramsach	Futures	Clay	(Germany) Jakob Sude	(Austria) Maximilian Neuchrist (Austria) Pascal Brünner	2–6, 6–2, [5–10]
Win	5–5	Sep 2017	Great Britain F5, Roehampton	Futures	Hard	(Monaco) Lucas Catarina	(United Kingdom) Luke Johnson (Republic of Ireland) Peter Bothwell	6–2, 6–2
Win	6–5	Nov 2017	Greece F7, Heraklion	Futures	Hard	(Austria) Matthias Haim	(Belgium) Germain Gigounon (Czech Republic) Dominik Kellovský	7–6^{(7–5)}, 6–4
Loss	6–6	Dec 2017	Dominican Republic F2, Santo Domingo	Futures	Hard	(Austria) Matthias Haim	(Portugal) Bernardo Saraiva (Netherlands) Sem Verbeek	5–7, 4–6
Loss	6–7	Mar 2018	Greece F1, Heraklion	Futures	Hard	(Germany) Jakob Sude	(Serbia) Danilo Petrović (Hungary) Gábor Borsos	7–5, 4–6, [6–10]
Win	7–7	Mar 2018	Greece F3, Heraklion	Futures	Hard	(Germany) Jakob Sude	(Italy) Filippo Baldi (Italy) Julian Ocleppo	6–4, 6–3
Win	8–7	Apr 2018	Italy F5, Santa Margherita di Pula	Futures	Clay	(Netherlands) Mark Vervoort	(Netherlands) Tallon Griekspoor (Belgium) Maxime Authom	7–6^{(7–3)}, 4–6, [12–10]
Loss	8–8	Jan 2019	M15 Manacor, Spain	WTT	Clay	(Germany) Jakob Sude	(Belgium) Jeroen Vanneste (France) Laurent Lokoli	1–6, 4–6
Win	9–8	Jan 2019	M15 Manacor, Spain	WTT	Clay	(Germany) Jakob Sude	(Switzerland) Sandro Ehrat (Switzerland) Vullnet Tashi	4–6, 6–3, [11–9]
Loss	9–9	Mar 2019	M15 Sharm El Sheikh, Egypt	WTT	Hard	(Germany) Daniel Altmaier	(Italy) Enrico Dalla Valle (Italy) Francesco Forti	6–4, 1–6, [7–10]
Loss	9–10	Nov 2019	M15 Heraklion, Greece	WTT	Hard	(Austria) Jonas Trinker	(United Kingdom) Luke Johnson (Poland) Jan Zieliński	6–1, 2–6, [10–12]
Loss	9–11	May 2022	M15 Heraklion, Greece	WTT	Hard	(Austria) Jonas Trinker	(Georgia (country)) Aleksandre Bakshi (Germany) Kai Lemstra	6–7^{(3–7)}, 6–7^{(3–7)}
Win	10–11	Jun 2022	M15 Ra'anana, Israel	WTT	Hard	(Switzerland) Luca Castelnuovo	(Latvia) Kārlis Ozoliņš (Latvia) Robert Strombachs	6–4, 6–3
Win	11–11	Aug 2024	M25 Maribor, Slovenia	WTT	Clay	(Czech Republic) Dominik Kellovský	(Czech Republic) Filip Duda (Czech Republic) David Poljak	7–6^{(7–4)}, 6–2
Win	12–11	Oct 2024	M15 Heraklion, Greece	WTT	Hard	(Switzerland) Johan Nikles	(Greece) Christos Antonopoulos (Greece) Michalis Sakellaridis	6–2, 6–1
