= 2017 Italian Open – Men's singles =

Men's singles
- 2017 Italian Open

Final
- Champion: (Germany) Alexander Zverev
- Runner-up: (Serbia) Novak Djokovic
- Score: 6–4, 6–3

Details
- Draw: 56 (7 Q / 4 WC )
- Seeds: 16

Events
| Singles | men | women |
| Doubles | men | women |
| ← 2016 · | Italian Open | · 2018 → |

Alexander Zverev defeated Novak Djokovic in the final, 6–4, 6–3 to win the men's singles tennis title at the 2017 Italian Open. It was his first Masters 1000 title, becoming the first player born in the 1990s to win a Masters event.

Andy Murray was the defending champion, but lost in the second round to Fabio Fognini.

== Seeds ==
The top eight seeds receive a bye into the second round.

1. (United Kingdom) Andy Murray (second round)
2. (Serbia) Novak Djokovic (final)
3. (Switzerland) Stan Wawrinka (third round)
4. (Spain) Rafael Nadal (quarterfinals)
5. (Canada) Milos Raonic (quarterfinals)
6. (Croatia) Marin Čilić (quarterfinals)
7. (Japan) Kei Nishikori (third round)
8. (Austria) Dominic Thiem (semifinals)

9. (Belgium) David Goffin (third round)
10. (Bulgaria) Grigor Dimitrov (first round)
11. (France) Lucas Pouille (first round)
12. (Czech Republic) Tomáš Berdych (third round)
13. (United States) Jack Sock (third round)
14. (Spain) Albert Ramos Viñolas (first round)
15. (Spain) Pablo Carreño Busta (second round)
16. (Germany) Alexander Zverev (champion)

Click on the seed number of a player to go to their draw section.

== Draw ==
=== Key ===
- Q = Qualifier
- WC = Wild card
- LL = Lucky loser
- Alt = Alternate
- ITF = ITF entry
- PR = Protected ranking
- SR = Special ranking
- SE = Special exempt
- JE = Junior exempt
- JR = Junior Accelerator Programme entrant
- CO = College Accelerator Programme entrant
- NG = Next Gen Accelerator Program entrant
- w/o = Walkover
- r = Retired
- d = Defaulted

=== Finals ===
Quarterfinals
16 | (Germany) Alexander Zverev | 7^{7} | 6
5 | (Canada) Milos Raonic | 6^{4} | 1
(United States) John Isner | 7^{7} | 2 | 7^{7}
6 | (Croatia) Marin Čilić | 6^{3} | 6 | 6^{2}
8 | (Austria) Dominic Thiem | 6 | 6
4 | (Spain) Rafael Nadal | 4 | 3
(Argentina) Juan Martín del Potro | 1 | 4
2 | (Serbia) Novak Djokovic | 6 | 6

Semifinals
16 | (Germany) Alexander Zverev | 6 | 6^{5} | 6
(United States) John Isner | 4 | 7^{7} | 1
8 | (Austria) Dominic Thiem | 1 | 0
2 | (Serbia) Novak Djokovic | 6 | 6

Final
16 | (Germany) Alexander Zverev | 6 | 6
2 | (Serbia) Novak Djokovic | 4 | 3

=== Top half ===
==== Section 1 ====
First round
(Italy) F Fognini | 6 | 6
WC | (Italy) M Berrettini | 1 | 3
(Serbia) V Troicki | 7^{7} | 6
WC | (Italy) S Napolitano | 6^{1} | 2
Q | (South Africa) K Anderson | 4 | 6 | 4
16 | (Germany) A Zverev | 6 | 4 | 6
12 | (Czech Republic) T Berdych | 7^{9} | 6
(Germany) M Zverev | 6^{7} | 4
(Netherlands) R Haase | 3 | 5
Q | (Argentina) C Berlocq | 6 | 7
LL | (United States) E Escobedo | 0 | 6 | 6^{1}
PR | (Germany) T Haas | 6 | 4 | 7^{7}

Second round
1 | (United Kingdom) A Murray | 2 | 4
(Italy) F Fognini | 6 | 6
(Serbia) V Troicki | 3 | 4
16 | (Germany) A Zverev | 6 | 6
12 | (Czech Republic) T Berdych | 6 | 6
Q | (Argentina) C Berlocq | 3 | 4
PR | (Germany) T Haas | 4 | 3
5 | (Canada) M Raonic | 6 | 6

Third round
(Italy) F Fognini | 3 | 3
16 | (Germany) A Zverev | 6 | 6
12 | (Czech Republic) T Berdych | 3 | 2
5 | (Canada) M Raonic | 6 | 6

Quarterfinals
16 | (Germany) A Zverev | 7^{7} | 6
5 | (Canada) M Raonic | 6^{4} | 1

==== Section 2 ====
First round
(France) N Mahut | 3 | 4
(France) B Paire | 6 | 6
(Germany) F Mayer | 6 | 6
Q | (Brazil) T Monteiro | 4 | 2
(United States) J Isner | 6^{4} | 7^{7} | 6
14 | (Spain) A Ramos Viñolas | 7^{7} | 6^{4} | 1
9 | (Belgium) D Goffin | 6^{5} | 6 | 6
LL | (Brazil) T Bellucci | 7^{7} | 3 | 4
(Spain) F Verdasco | 6 | 6
(United States) D Young | 3 | 3
(United States) R Harrison | 2 | 7^{7} | 6
LL | (United States) J Donaldson | 6 | 6^{0} | 3

Second round
3 | (Switzerland) S Wawrinka | 6 | 1 | 6
(France) B Paire | 3 | 6 | 3
(Germany) F Mayer | 6^{4} | 6^{4}
(United States) J Isner | 7^{7} | 7^{7}
9 | (Belgium) D Goffin | 3 | 6 | 6
(Spain) F Verdasco | 6 | 3 | 2
(United States) R Harrison | 3 | 2
6 | (Croatia) M Čilić | 6 | 6

Third round
3 | (Switzerland) S Wawrinka | 6^{1} | 4
(United States) J Isner | 7^{7} | 6
9 | (Belgium) D Goffin | 3 | 4
6 | (Croatia) M Čilić | 6 | 6

Quarterfinals
(United States) J Isner | 7^{7} | 2 | 7^{7}
6 | (Croatia) M Čilić | 6^{3} | 6 | 6^{2}

=== Bottom half ===
==== Section 3 ====
First round
Q | (France) A Mannarino | 4 | 6^{2}
(Uruguay) P Cuevas | 6 | 7^{7}
Q | (Germany) J-L Struff | 6^{8} | 6 | 6
(Australia) B Tomic | 7^{10} | 1 | 4
(United States) S Querrey | 7^{8} | 7^{10}
11 | (France) L Pouille | 6^{6} | 6^{8}
13 | (United States) J Sock | 6 | 1 | 7
(Argentina) D Schwartzman | 4 | 6 | 5
(Czech Republic) J Veselý | 6 | 6
(United Kingdom) D Evans | 3 | 1
Q | (Spain) N Almagro | 7^{8} | 6
WC | (Italy) A Seppi | 6^{6} | 3

Second round
8 | (Austria) D Thiem | 7^{7} | 6
(Uruguay) P Cuevas | 6^{4} | 4
Q | (Germany) J-L Struff | 4 | 3
(United States) S Querrey | 6 | 6
13 | (United States) J Sock | 6 | 3 | 7^{7}
(Czech Republic) J Veselý | 4 | 6 | 6^{1}
Q | (Spain) N Almagro | 0^{r}
4 | (Spain) R Nadal | 3

Third round
8 | (Austria) D Thiem | 3 | 6 | 7^{9}
(United States) S Querrey | 6 | 3 | 6^{7}
13 | (United States) J Sock | 3 | 4
4 | (Spain) R Nadal | 6 | 6

Quarterfinals
8 | (Austria) D Thiem | 6 | 6
4 | (Spain) R Nadal | 4 | 3

==== Section 4 ====
First round
(Spain) D Ferrer | 4 | 6 | 6
(Spain) F López | 6 | 3 | 1
(Portugal) J Sousa | 3 | 4
(United Kingdom) K Edmund | 6 | 6
(Argentina) JM del Potro | 3 | 6 | 6
10 | (Bulgaria) G Dimitrov | 6 | 2 | 3
15 | (Spain) P Carreño Busta | 6 | 6
(France) G Simon | 3 | 3
LL | (Ukraine) A Dolgopolov | 4 | 2
(Spain) R Bautista Agut | 6 | 6
WC | (Italy) G Mager | 7^{7} | 4 | 0^{r}
Q | (United Kingdom) A Bedene | 6^{3} | 6 | 3

Second round
7 | (Japan) K Nishikori | 7 | 6
(Spain) D Ferrer | 5 | 2
(United Kingdom) K Edmund | 5 | 4
(Argentina) JM del Potro | 7 | 6
15 | (Spain) P Carreño Busta | 7^{8} | 1 | 4
(Spain) R Bautista Agut | 6^{6} | 6 | 6
Q | (United Kingdom) A Bedene | 6^{2} | 2
2 | (Serbia) N Djokovic | 7^{7} | 6

Third round
7 | (Japan) K Nishikori | 6^{4} | 3
(Argentina) JM del Potro | 7^{7} | 6
(Spain) R Bautista Agut | 4 | 4
2 | (Serbia) N Djokovic | 6 | 6

Quarterfinals
(Argentina) JM del Potro | 1 | 4
2 | (Serbia) N Djokovic | 6 | 6

== Qualifying ==
=== Seeds ===
1. (Germany) Jan-Lennard Struff (qualified)
2. (France) Adrian Mannarino (qualified)
3. (Brazil) Thomaz Bellucci (qualifying competition, lucky loser)
4. (United Kingdom) Aljaž Bedene (qualified)
5. (South Africa) Kevin Anderson (qualified)
6. (Argentina) Carlos Berlocq (qualified)
7. (Spain) Nicolás Almagro (qualified)
8. (United States) Jared Donaldson (qualifying competition, lucky loser)
9. (Kazakhstan) Mikhail Kukushkin (first round, retired)
10. (United States) Ernesto Escobedo (qualifying competition, lucky loser)
11. (Uzbekistan) Denis Istomin (qualifying competition, retired)
12. (Dominican Republic) Víctor Estrella Burgos (first round)
13. (Ukraine) Alexandr Dolgopolov (qualifying competition, lucky loser)
14. (France) Pierre-Hugues Herbert (first round)

=== Qualifiers ===
1. (Germany) Jan-Lennard Struff
2. (France) Adrian Mannarino
3. (Brazil) Thiago Monteiro
4. (United Kingdom) Aljaž Bedene
5. (South Africa) Kevin Anderson
6. (Argentina) Carlos Berlocq
7. (Spain) Nicolás Almagro

=== Lucky losers ===
1. (Brazil) Thomaz Bellucci
2. (United States) Jared Donaldson
3. (United States) Ernesto Escobedo
4. (Ukraine) Alexandr Dolgopolov

=== Qualifying draw ===
==== First qualifier ====
First round
1 | (Germany) Jan-Lennard Struff | 6 | 6
(Japan) Taro Daniel | 1 | 2
WC | (Italy) Andrea Pellegrino | 4 | 5
11 | (Uzbekistan) Denis Istomin | 6 | 7

Qualifying competition
1 | (Germany) Jan-Lennard Struff | 6 | 5
11 | (Uzbekistan) Denis Istomin | 2 | 5^{r}

==== Second qualifier ====
First round
2 | (France) Adrian Mannarino | 4 | 6 | 7
WC | (Italy) Salvatore Caruso | 6 | 4 | 5
(Romania) Marius Copil | 6 | 3 | 4
8 | (United States) Jared Donaldson | 1 | 6 | 6

Qualifying competition
2 | (France) Adrian Mannarino | 6 | 6
8 | (United States) Jared Donaldson | 4 | 1

==== Third qualifier ====
First round
3 | (Brazil) Thomaz Bellucci | 6 | 6
(Bosnia and Herzegovina) Damir Džumhur | 2 | 3
(Brazil) Thiago Monteiro | 6 | 7^{7}
14 | (France) Pierre-Hugues Herbert | 2 | 6^{0}

Qualifying competition
3 | (Brazil) Thomaz Bellucci | 3 | 6^{3}
(Brazil) Thiago Monteiro | 6 | 7^{7}

==== Fourth qualifier ====
First round
4 | (United Kingdom) Aljaž Bedene | 6 | 6
(Slovakia) Lukáš Lacko | 2 | 3
(Argentina) Renzo Olivo | 6 | 4
9 | (Kazakhstan) Mikhail Kukushkin | 1 | 1^{r}

Qualifying competition
4 | (United Kingdom) Aljaž Bedene | 6 | 6
(Argentina) Renzo Olivo | 3 | 4

==== Fifth qualifier ====
First round
5 | (South Africa) Kevin Anderson | 4 | 6 | 6
(Italy) Luca Vanni | 6 | 1 | 2
(Italy) Alessandro Giannessi | 3 | 4
10 | (United States) Ernesto Escobedo | 6 | 6

Qualifying competition
5 | (South Africa) Kevin Anderson | 6 | 6
10 | (United States) Ernesto Escobedo | 2 | 3

==== Sixth qualifier ====
First round
6 | (Argentina) Carlos Berlocq | 6 | 6
(Colombia) Santiago Giraldo | 2 | 1
WC | (Italy) Andrea Arnaboldi | 6 | 5 | 7^{7}
12 | (Dominican Republic) Víctor Estrella Burgos | 0 | 7 | 6^{2}

Qualifying competition
6 | (Argentina) Carlos Berlocq | 6 | 7
WC | (Italy) Andrea Arnaboldi | 1 | 5

==== Seventh qualifier ====
First round
7 | (Spain) Nicolás Almagro | 6 | 3 | 7^{7}
WC | (Italy) Lorenzo Sonego | 3 | 6 | 6^{3}
(Barbados) Darian King | 3 | 6 | 6^{7}
13 | (Ukraine) Alexandr Dolgopolov | 6 | 3 | 7^{9}

Qualifying competition
7 | (Spain) Nicolás Almagro | 7 | 6
13 | (Ukraine) Alexandr Dolgopolov | 5 | 4
