= Matteo Berrettini =

Italian tennis player (born 1996)

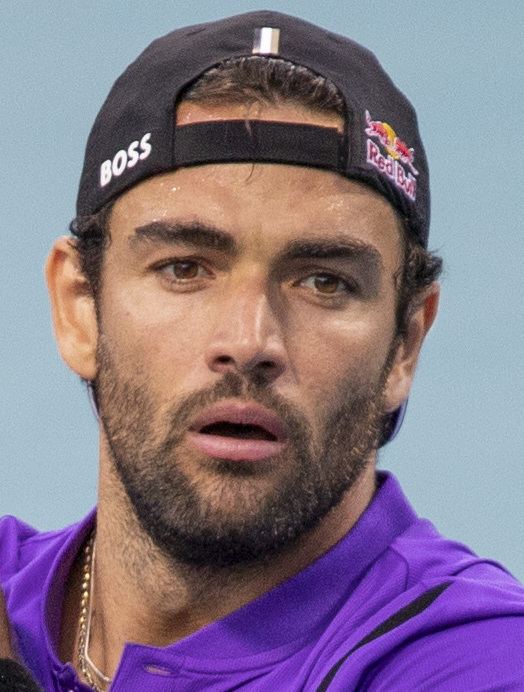
- Berrettini at the 2025 Miami Open
- Country (sports): Italy
- Residence: Monte Carlo, Monaco
- Born: 12 April 1996 (age 30) Rome, Italy
- Height: 1.96 m (6 ft 5 in)
- Turned pro: 2015
- Plays: Right-handed (two-handed backhand)
- Coach: Vincenzo Santopadre (2011–Oct 2023); Francisco Roig (Dec 2023–Oct 2024); Alessandro Bega (Mar 2024–); Thomas Enqvist (Mar 2026–), Umberto Rianna
- Prize money: US $14,979,686

Singles
- Career record: 225–128
- Career titles: 10
- Highest ranking: No. 6 (31 January 2022)
- Current ranking: No. 43 (9 November 2026)

Grand Slam singles results
- Australian Open: SF (2022)
- French Open: QF (2021, 2026)
- Wimbledon: F (2021)
- US Open: SF (2019)

Other tournaments
- Tour Finals: RR (2019, 2021)

Doubles
- Career record: 27–26
- Career titles: 2
- Highest ranking: No. 105 (22 July 2019)
- Current ranking: No. 586 (31 August 2026)

Grand Slam doubles results
- Australian Open: 1R (2019)
- French Open: 2R (2019)
- Wimbledon: 1R (2018)
- US Open: 2R (2018)

Team competitions
- Davis Cup: W (2024, 2025); Record: 12–2
- Last updated on: 31 August 2026.

Matteo Berrettini (Italian pronunciation: [matˈtɛːo berretˈtiːni]; born 12 April 1996) is an Italian professional tennis player. He has been ranked as high as world No. 6 in singles by the ATP, achieved in January 2022, and No. 105 in doubles, attained in July 2019. His best performances were reaching the singles final at 2021 Wimbledon, the semifinals of the 2019 US and the 2022 Australian Opens, and the quarterfinals of the 2021 and 2026 French Open. He is the first Italian man to reach the quarterfinals or better at all four Majors.

Berrettini has won ten ATP Tour singles titles and two doubles titles. Berrettini was part of the Italian team that won the Davis Cup in 2024 and 2025, going undefeated in all his rubbers. He has been undefeated in his past 11 singles matches, extending to 2022.

After turning professional in 2015, Berrettini won two singles titles on the ITF World Tennis Tour and three on the ATP Challenger Tour, breaking into the top 100 of the ATP rankings in May 2018. Two months later, he reached his first ATP Tour final at the 2018 Swiss Open, where he won his maiden title and made his top 60 debut. In 2019, after claiming two further titles at the Hungarian Open and Stuttgart Open, he entered into the top 25, and carried his momentum into his maiden career major semifinal at the US Open to end the year ranked in the top 10. Berrettini made additional strides in 2021 after reaching his first Masters 1000 final at the Madrid Open, winning his first ATP 500 title at the Queen's Club Championships, and becoming the first Italian player, male or female, to contest a Wimbledon singles final. Berrettini is known for his aggressive game style boosted by his large build. At 1.96 m (6 ft 5 in), Berrettini possesses one of the tour's fastest serves and often uses his heavy topspin forehand to dictate rallies and set up one-two punches, making him versatile on all surfaces. In order to compensate for his weaknesses, he often deploys his backhand slice to keep the ball low for his opponent and uses a blocked return to neutralize points. As an all-court player, he has also developed these tactics to be comfortable at the net to close points.

== Junior career ==
Berrettini played his first junior match in May 2011 at the age of 15 at a grade 1 tournament in Italy. He won 6 singles titles (5 on clay court and 1 on hard court) and reached career-high junior ranking of world No. 52. Berrettini ended his junior career with an overall win–loss record of 84–30.

Junior Grand Slam results – singles:

Australian Open: 2R (2014)
French Open: 1R (2014)
Wimbledon: 2R (2014)
US Open: 3R (2014)

Junior Grand Slam results – doubles:

Australian Open: 1R (2014)
French Open: QF (2014)
Wimbledon: 1R (2014)
US Open: 1R (2014)

== Professional career ==
=== 2017: ATP debut ===
Berrettini made his ATP main draw debut at the Italian Open after earning a wildcard in the pre-qualifying wildcard tournament. He was defeated by Fabio Fognini in the first round. He was the top seed in the eight man Italian field competing for the final spot in the inaugural Next Generation ATP Finals in Milan, but lost to Filippo Baldi in straight sets.

=== 2018: First title ===
After qualifying for the 2018 Qatar ExxonMobil Open, ranked No. 135, he notched his first tour-level win over No. 55 Viktor Troicki. On his next tournament, he entered his first Grand Slam main draw as a lucky loser at Australian Open but lost in the first round to No. 27 Adrian Mannarino.

Berrettini entered the 2018 BNP Paribas Open as a lucky loser replacing 17th seed Nick Kyrgios directly in the second round.

At the Swiss Open Gstaad, Berrettini won his first ATP title, defeating Roberto Bautista Agut in the final. He also won his first ATP doubles title at the same event, partnering with Daniele Bracciali.

=== 2019: Major semifinal and top 10 ===
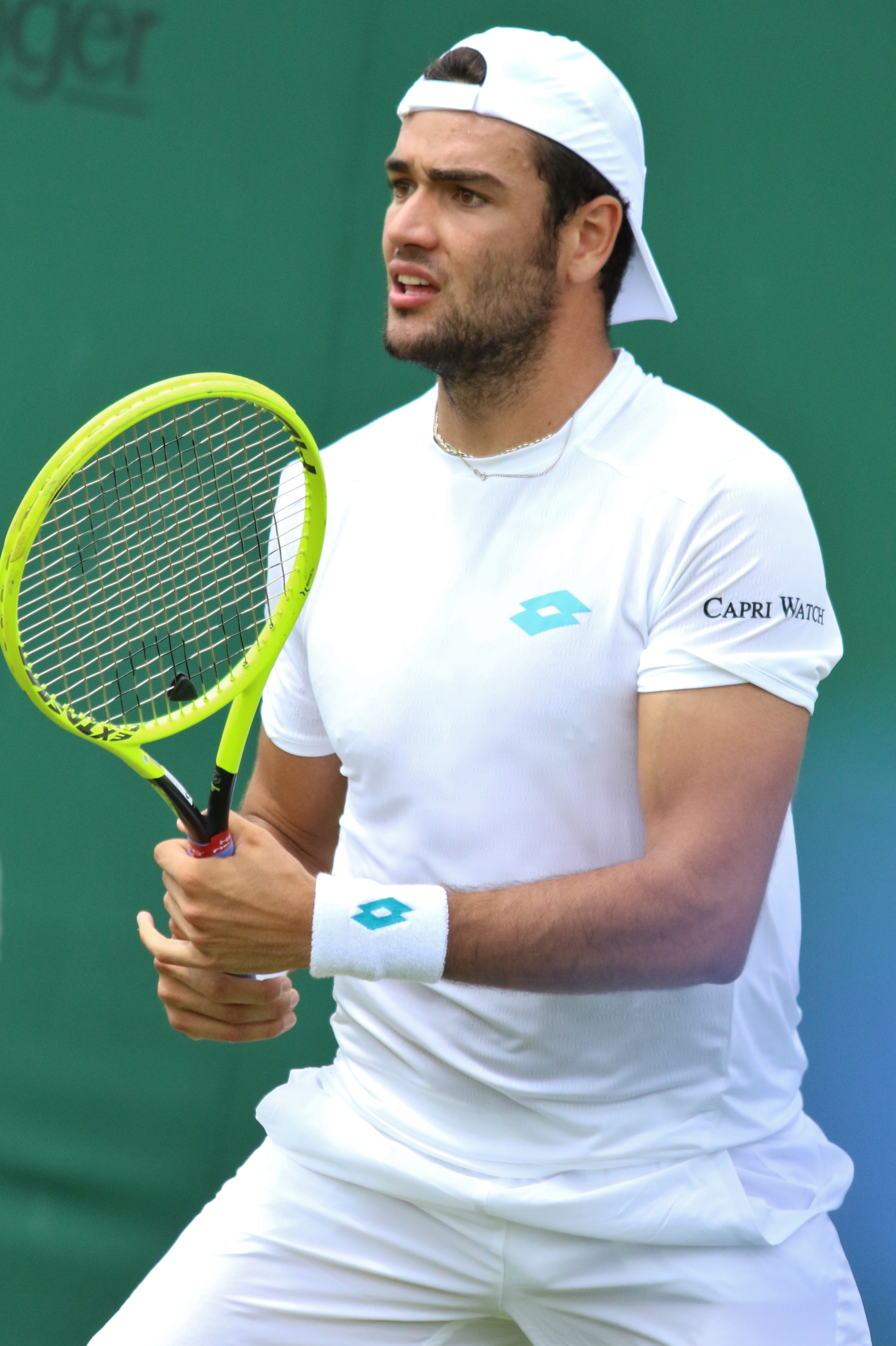
Berrettini at the 2019 Wimbledon Championships

At the Hungarian Open, Berrettini won his second ATP singles title, defeating Filip Krajinović in the final. Berrettini continued his form into the following week as he reached the final at the Bavarian International Tennis Championships. There, his nine-match winning streak was snapped by Cristian Garín in a third set tie-breaker. At the Italian Open, Berrettini upset Alexander Zverev in the round of 32 for his first win against a top-5 player.

Berrettini's improvement continued into the grass court season, winning his third singles title in Stuttgart over Félix Auger-Aliassime in the final. Berrettini's serve was not broken throughout the entire tournament, thereby making him only the fifth man since 1999 to win two tournaments without dropping serve (the other occasion coming at the 2018 Gstaad Open). The following week, Berrettini reached his first ATP 500 semifinal at the Halle Open where he was defeated by David Goffin. Following the tournament, the Italian broke into the top-20.

As the 17th seed at Wimbledon, Berrettini reached the fourth round of a Grand Slam for the first time after defeating Diego Schwartzman in five sets. He then lost to eight-time champion Roger Federer comprehensively in 74 minutes. After congratulating Federer for his win during their post-match handshake, Berrettini jokingly asked Federer, "Thanks for the tennis lesson, how much do I owe you?"

Berrettini withdrew from his next two events in Gstaad and Montreal, citing an ankle injury. He played a lead-up tournament in Cincinnati before competing in the US Open. There, despite his lack of preparation, Berettini reached his first Major quarterfinal after defeating Andrey Rublev in the fourth round. He then beat Gaël Monfils in a fifth set tiebreak to become the first Italian man to reach the US Open semifinals since 1977. Berrettini's run ended against eventual champion Rafael Nadal in straight sets, despite holding two set points in the opening-set tiebreak.

Pursuing an ATP Finals berth, Berrettini achieved his best Masters result yet at the Shanghai Masters by reaching the semifinals. Along the way Berrettini claimed his second career top-5 victory by beating Dominic Thiem in the quarterfinals. Another semifinal appearance at the Vienna Open saw Berrettini break into the top ten rankings. As world number 8, Berrettini claimed the final spot in the 2019 ATP Finals in London. There, he lost his opening two round robin matches to Novak Djokovic and Roger Federer, before becoming the first Italian man to win a match at the event by defeating Dominic Thiem.

=== 2020: Stagnant results ===
After withdrawing from the ATP Cup due to physical problems, at the Australian Open, Berrettini beat Andrew Harris before losing to Tennys Sandgren in the second round. After the tour shutdown and return due to the COVID-19 pandemic, he won the Ultimate Tennis Showdown. He lost in the third round to Reilly Opelka in Cincinnati.

At the US Open, he reached the fourth round without dropping a set. He then lost to Andrey Rublev in four sets in a rematch of the previous year's fourth round.

He reached the quarterfinals in Rome for the first time, losing to Casper Ruud. Berrettini reached the third round at the French Open. At the Paris Masters, he lost to Marcos Giron in the first round, citing physical pain. Despite his weak results, Berrettini finished in the top-10 for the second consecutive year (due to his 2019 ranking points being protected by the post COVID-19 ranking changes).

=== 2021: Wimbledon final ===
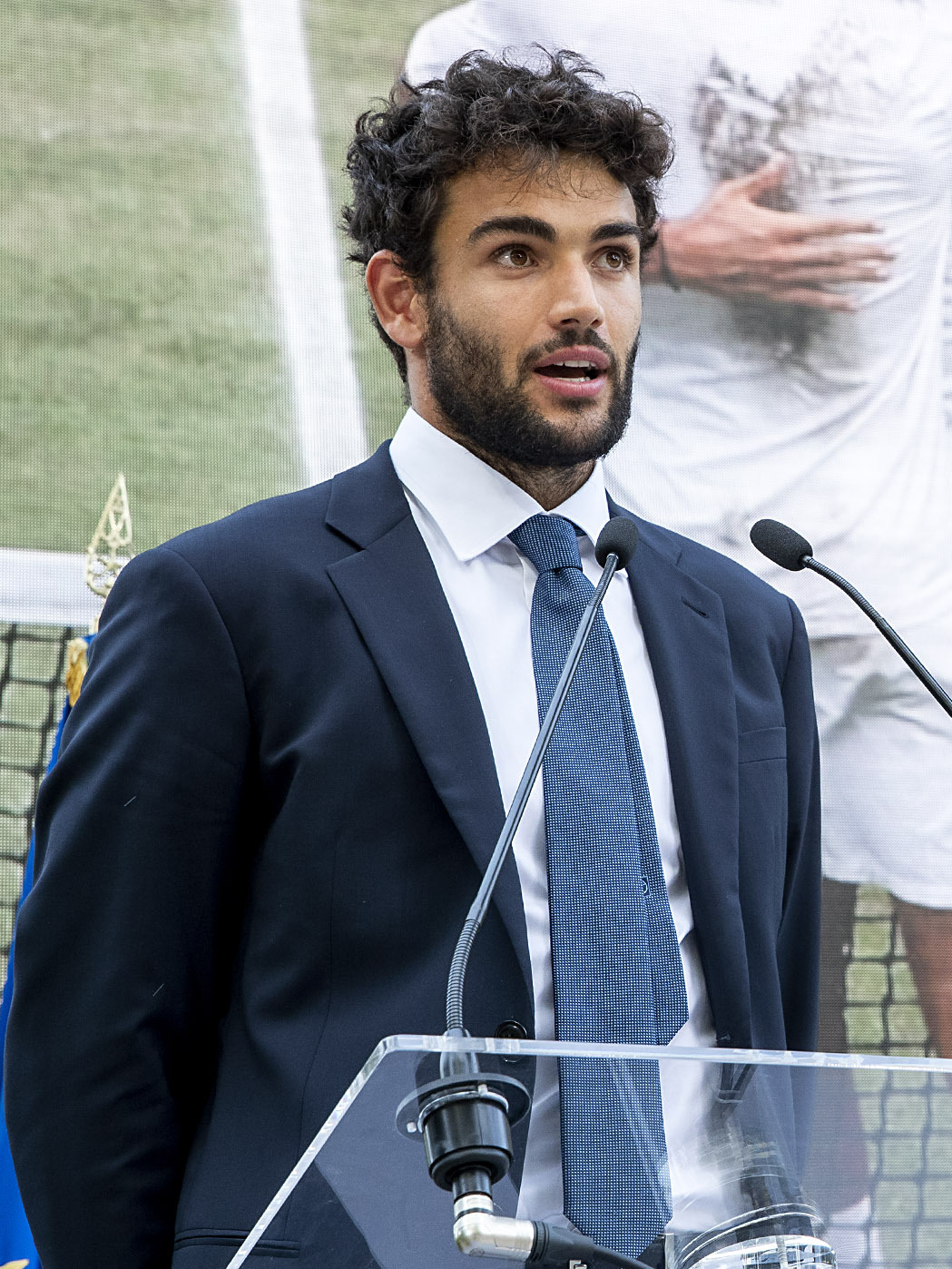
Berrettini in 2021

Berrettini's strong performance advanced Italy to the final of the 2021 ATP Cup against Russia, where he lost to Daniil Medvedev in straight sets. At the Australian Open, he reached the fourth round but withdrew from the tournament with abdominal pain. Berrettini remained out of competition until the clay season in April, where he won his first singles title in over a year at the Serbia Open over Aslan Karatsev. In May at the Madrid Open, he reached his first Masters 1000 final, which he lost to Alexander Zverev in three sets.

At the French Open, Berrettini became the first Italian man to reach the fourth round at each major. He reached his second career major quarterfinal when Roger Federer withdrew ahead of their fourth-round match. In the quarterfinals, he lost in four sets against World No. 1 Novak Djokovic.

On 20 June Berrettini won the biggest title of his career at the Queen's Club Championships, his first at the ATP 500 level. He became the first Italian in history to win this title, defeating three Britons en route (Andy Murray, Dan Evans, and Cameron Norrie).

At the Wimbledon Championships, Berrettini reached his second straight Major quarterfinal, then defeated Felix Auger-Aliassime in four sets to reach his first Wimbledon semifinal, becoming the first Italian man in the Open Era to reach the Wimbledon semifinals and the first since Nicola Pietrangeli in 1960. He advanced to his maiden major final after beating Hubert Hurkacz, becoming the first Italian to reach a Wimbledon singles final and the first Italian man to reach a major final since Adriano Panatta at the 1976 French Open. There, he lost to Novak Djokovic in four sets.

At the US Open, Berrettini reached the quarterfinals following wins over Ilya Ivashka and Oscar Otte. He then lost to Novak Djokovic in four sets, in a repeat of the Wimbledon final. At the ATP Finals, Berrettini was forced to withdraw with an abdominal injury during his first match with Alexander Zverev.

=== 2022: Australian Open semifinal, world No. 6 ===
At the Australian Open, Berrettini reached the quarterfinals for the first time after defeating Brandon Nakashima, Stefan Kozlov, Carlos Alcaraz, and Pablo Carreño Busta en route. He became the first man born in the 1990s and the first Italian man to reach the quarterfinals at all four majors. By defeating Monfils in five sets, Berrettini then became the first Italian man to reach the singles semifinals at the tournament. There, he was stopped by eventual champion Nadal in four sets, but as a result of his run, he improved to a career-high ranking of world No. 6. Following a poor outing in Rio de Janeiro and an early retirement in Acapulco, he then traveled to Indian Wells, where he was dispatched in the fourth round by Miomir Kecmanović in three sets. Soon after, Berrettini announced that he had sustained an injury to his right hand that necessitated emergency surgery, forcing him to withdraw from Miami and the tour's clay swing, including the French Open, in order to fully recover.

Berrettini returned for the tour's grasscourt season at the Stuttgart Open in early June, and found his form by winning the title. He later confirmed his form, winning his second title at the Queen's Club Championships.

He withdrew from the 2022 Wimbledon Championships after testing positive for COVID-19. In July 2022, Berrettini entered the Swiss Open Gstaad final and lost in three sets against Casper Ruud. At the US Open, Berrettini defeated Andy Murray in the third round. He reached the quarterfinals after defeating Alejandro Davidovich Fokina in five sets. In the quarterfinals, he lost to Casper Ruud in straight sets. At the 2022 Laver Cup, Berrettini was named an alternate for Team Europe, and replaced Roger Federer mid-tournament, after Federer played the final match of his career in doubles.

=== 2023: Injuries, rankings decline, hiatus ===
Berrettini started his season at the inaugural edition of the United Cup, defeating Thaigo Monteiro and Casper Ruud in straight sets. Then, he beat Hubert Hurkacz in three sets to help Team Italy move on to the semifinals. He lost to Stefanos Tsitsipas in three sets. Italy still made the final though, but Berrettini lost to Taylor Fritz in the final, giving team USA the title.

He then played the 2023 Australian Open, losing to former world No. 1 Andy Murray in the first round in five tight sets in a close-to-five hours match thriller. After that, he played the Mexican Open, defeating Alex Molčan and Elias Ymer, before retiring to Holger Rune in the quarterfinals.

He lost in the second round of the 2023 BNP Paribas Open to Taro Daniel. He then played the Arizona Tennis Classic, an ATP Challenger 175 tournament. He beat Mattia Bellucci, and Aleksandar Vukic, before losing to Alexander Shevchenko in the quarterfinals. He lost also in the second round of the 2023 Miami Open. He won one match at the 2023 Monte-Carlo Masters before he was forced to withdraw from his third round match. He skipped the 2023 Mutua Madrid Open, the 2023 Italian Open and the 2023 French Open. Injury also saw him miss the opportunity to defend his back to back titles at the Queen's Club Championships.

He beat Zverev at Wimbledon in three sets to advance to the fourth round, where he lost to Carlos Alcaraz. At the US Open he retired in the second round putting an early end to his season. In October he split with his coach Santopadre and started to work with Francisco Roig, former assistant coach of Rafael Nadal, in December.

=== 2024–2025: Comeback, two titles, top 30, Injury ===
Berrettini started the year by withdrawing from 2024 Australian Open on the eve of his scheduled first-round match against Stefanos Tsitsipas because of a foot injury. He then held an online press conference on 20 February to announce that he will be back to competition in March after six months of hiatus, starting from the 2024 Arizona Tennis Classic and the 2024 Miami Open and then into the clay season. On his comeback he won his first match over Hugo Gaston in Phoenix. He reached the final, defeating two more French players, eighth seed Arthur Cazaux, Terence Atmane and then seventh seed Aleksandar Vukic before losing to defending champion Nuno Borges. In Miami he lost to Andy Murray in three sets in a close-to-three hours match while dealing with intestinal virus, almost fainting at some point.

Using protected ranking, he entered the 2024 Grand Prix Hassan II and reached his first final since 2022 in Naples, defeating sixth seed Alexander Shevchenko, Jaume Munar, fourth seed Lorenzo Sonego and seventh seed Mariano Navone. He lifted his fourth clay title and first since 2022, defeating defending champion Roberto Carballes Baena in straight sets. As a result, he moved 50 positions up and returned to the top 100 at No. 84 on 8 April 2024.

Berrettini lost in the first round of Monte-Carlo Masters to Miomir Kecmanović. He then withdrew from Munich to have another short training block ahead of the tournaments in Madrid and Rome. However, he later withdrew from Madrid, Rome and Roland Garros revealing he is not quite ready after recovering from illness, missing these tournaments for three consecutive years.

Having lost in the second round at Wimbledon to fellow Italian Jannik Sinner, Berrettini won his second title at the Swiss Open in Gstaad, defeating third seed Félix Auger-Aliassime in the quarterfinals, top seed Stefanos Tsitsipas in the last four and Quentin Halys in the final. He won back-to-back titles at the 2024 Generali Open Kitzbühel defeating Hugo Gaston in the final.

In October 2024, Berrettini announced he had split from coach Francisco Roig while Alessandro Bega continued to serve as his assistant coach.

In May 2025, following his retirement at the 2025 Italian Open due to an injury, he withdrew from the 2025 French Open and later the 2025 US Open. By missing the US Open he has missed seven majors in the last four years.

=== 2026: French Open quarterfinal, back to top 50 ===
His injury problems continued into the 2026 season, as he began the year by pulling out of the 2026 Australian Open due to an abdominal injury. He was back in training before the end of January. He began his season in Buenos Aires, defeating Federico Coria in the first round before losing to Vít Kopřiva. He reached the quarterfinal in Rio the following week, beating Tomás Barrios Vera and Dušan Lajović, before losing to Ignacio Buse.

He defeated Adrian Mannarino in the first round of Indian Wells before losing to Alexander Zverev in the second round. In Miami, he reached the third round, defeating Alexandre Muller, upsetting 10th seed Alexander Bublik, before losing to Valentin Vacherot.

In Monte-Carlo, as a wildcard, Berrettini upset world No. 10 Daniil Medvedev in a Double bagel, scoring his first top 10 win since beating Alexander Zverev in the previous year's edition, before losing to Joao Fonseca. Despite this, due to losses in Madrid and Rome, Berrettini fell out of the top 100 for the first time since 2024.

Entering the French Open, his first Roland Garros since 2021 and first Grand Slam since Wimbledon the previous year, Berrettini defeated Márton Fucsovics, upset 22nd seed Arthur Rinderknech, overcame Francisco Comesaña in over 5 hours, saving two match points, and defeated Juan Manuel Cerúndolo in the fourth round to reach his second French Open quarterfinal, his first Grand Slam quarterfinal since 2022. In the last eight, he retired due to injury while trailing fellow Italian, Matteo Arnaldi, by a set and a break of serve.

== Playing style ==
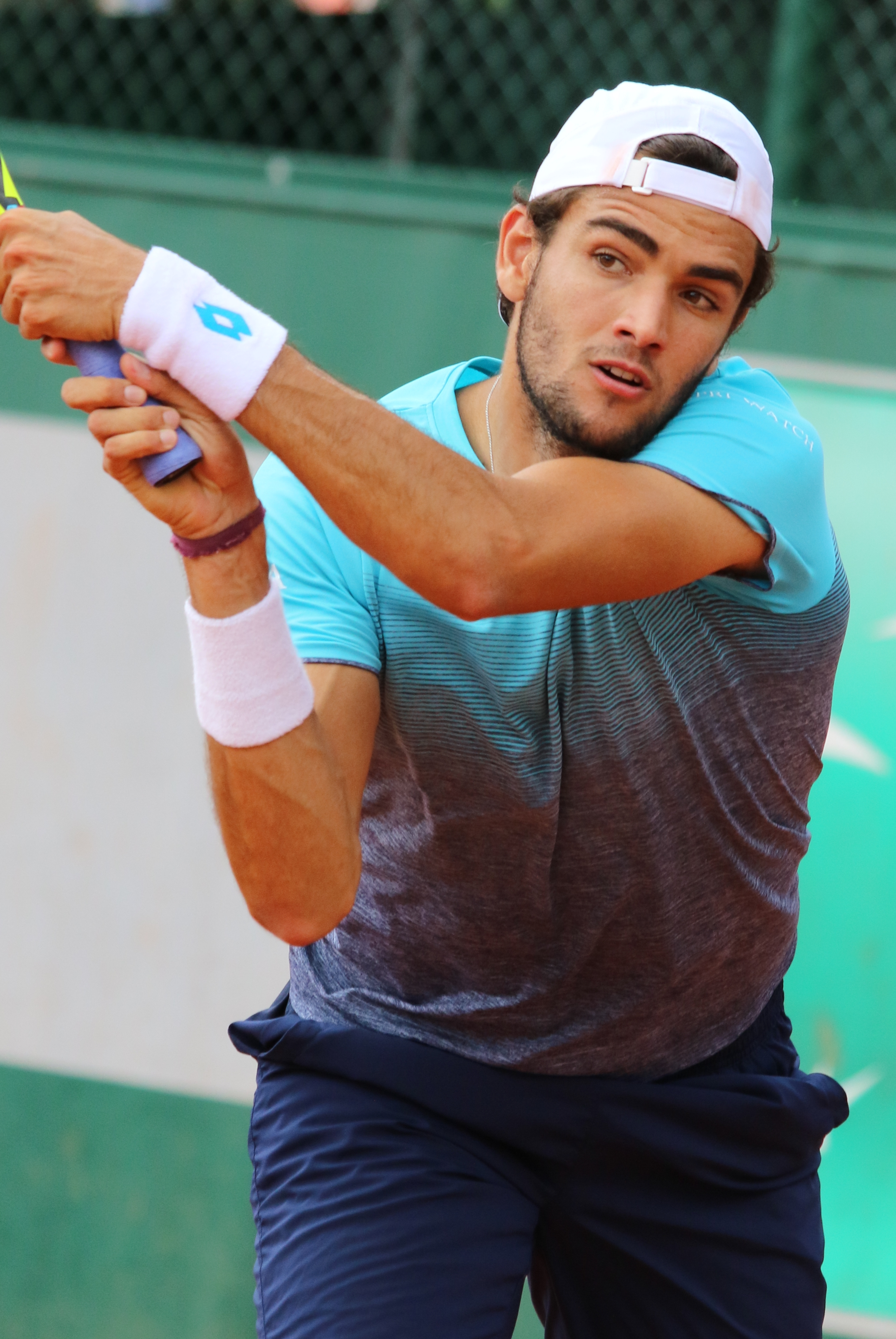
Berrettini's backhand

Berrettini is an aggressive all-court player known for his strong serve and forehand. His primary weapon is his forehand, known for its speed, spin and depth. At 1.96 m (6 ft 5 in), he also possesses a strong serve, capable of reaching up to 235 km/h (146 mph). His favorite surface is grass. In describing his build, American former tennis player Jim Courier compared Berrettini to a rugby player or a linebacker and described how that laid the foundation for his game style. Berrettini focuses on setting up quick points and hitting winners with aggressive play and putting pressure on his opponent. His transitional and net game are also integral parts of his game to finish off points, and he has been known to serve-and-volley. His aggressive game grounded in big serves and forehands have led to many to compare him to Fernando González and Juan Martín del Potro.

Despite having a weaker and less consistent backhand, Berrettini has developed a blocked return and deploys his developed backhand slice to neutralize aggression and keep the ball low. This slice allows him to set up aggressive forehands. He has good disguise on his dropshot on both wings, often following with an approach to the net.

Berrettini's weaknesses are his defensive game, consistency and footwork. He suffers most when put under pressure by opponents and is forced to defend on the run, especially when attacked on the backhand wing. Prior to 2019, inconsistency was an obstacle to success.

== Personal life ==
Born in Rome to Luca Berrettini and Claudia Bigo, Berrettini has a younger brother, Jacopo, who is also a tennis player. Berrettini is of partial Brazilian descent through his maternal grandmother Lucia Fogaça, a Brazilian born in Rio de Janeiro.

From 2019 to 2022, he was in a relationship with Croatian-born Australian tennis player Ajla Tomljanović.

In January 2023, he was first seen publicly with new girlfriend, Italian television presenter Melissa Satta. In February 2024, Berrettini confirmed his split with Melissa in an online press conference.

=== Television and film ===
Berrettini appears in the tennis docuseries Break Point, which premiered on Netflix on January 13, 2023. He also appears in the documentary film Federer: Twelve Final Days about Roger Federer's final tournament, the 2022 Laver Cup.

In August 2023, Hugo Boss launched its new collection, featuring Berrettini, Patrick Mahomes, Naomi Campbell, Suki Waterhouse, and Lee Min-ho in its campaign.

== Career statistics ==
=== Grand Slam tournament performance timeline ===
Key
W	F	SF	QF	#R	RR	Q#	DNQ	A	NH

(W) winner; (F) finalist; (SF) semifinalist; (QF) quarterfinalist; (#R) rounds 4, 3, 2, 1; (RR) round-robin stage; (Q#) qualification round; (DNQ) did not qualify; (A) absent; (NH) not held; (SR) strike rate (events won / competed); (W–L) win–loss record.
To avoid confusion and double counting, these charts are updated at the conclusion of a tournament or when the player's participation has ended.

Current through 2026 US Open.

Tournament	2017	2018	2019	2020	2021	2022	2023	2024	2025	2026	SR	W–L	Win%
Australian Open	A	1R	1R	2R	4R (Note: Berrettini withdrew before the fourth round of the 2021 Australian Open, which does not officially count as a loss.)	SF	1R	A	2R	A	0 / 7	10–6	63%
French Open	A	3R	2R	3R	QF (Note: Berrettini's fourth round opponent, Roger Federer, withdrew before the fourth round of the 2021 French Open, which does not officially count as a win.)	A	A	A	A	QF (Note: Berrettini retired during the quarterfinal match of the 2026 French Open due to injury.)	0 / 5	12–5	71%
Wimbledon	A	2R	4R	NH	F	A	4R	2R	1R	3R	0 / 7	16–7	70%
US Open	Q2	1R	SF	4R	QF	QF	2R	2R	A	2R	0 / 8	19–8	70%
Win–loss	0–0	3–4	9–4	6–3	16–3	9–2	4–3	2–2	1–2	7–3	0 / 27	57–26	69%

=== Grand Slam tournaments ===
==== Singles: 1 (runner-up) ====
Result	Year	Tournament	Surface	Opponent	Score
Loss	2021	Wimbledon	Grass	(Serbia) Novak Djokovic	7–6^{(7–4)}, 4–6, 4–6, 3–6

=== ATP 1000 tournaments ===
==== Singles: 1 (runner-up) ====
Result	Year	Tournament	Surface	Opponent	Score
Loss	2021	Madrid Open	Clay	(Germany) Alexander Zverev	7–6^{(10–8)}, 4–6, 3–6

=== Awards and honours ===
Berrettini has received the following awards and honours:

==== Professional awards ====
- ATP Most Improved Player – 2019
- ATP Comeback Player of the Year – 2024

==== Orders ====
- CONI Golden Collar of Sports Merit (Collare d'Oro al Merito Sportivo) – 2024

== See also ==
- Matteo Berrettini career statistics
- Italian players best ranking
- Tennis in Italy

Awards
Preceded by (Greece) Stefanos Tsitsipas	ATP Most Improved Player; 2019	Succeeded by (Russia) Andrey Rublev
Preceded by (Germany) Jan-Lennard Struff	ATP Comeback Player of the Year; 2024	Succeeded by Incumbent
