= Ben Shelton career statistics =

Career finals
| Discipline | Type | Won | Lost | Total |
|---|---|---|---|---|
| Singles | Grand Slam | 0 | 1 | 1 |
| Singles | ATP Finals | – | – | – |
| Singles | ATP 1000 | 2 | 0 | 2 |
| Singles | ATP 500 | 3 | 2 | 5 |
| Singles | ATP 250 | 2 | 0 | 2 |
| Singles | Olympics | – | – | – |
| Singles | Total | 7 | 3 | 10 |
| Doubles | Grand Slam | – | – | – |
| Doubles | ATP Finals | – | – | – |
| Doubles | ATP 1000 | – | – | – |
| Doubles | ATP 500 | 0 | 1 | 1 |
| Doubles | ATP 250 | 1 | 0 | 1 |
| Doubles | Olympics | – | – | – |
| Doubles | Total | 1 | 1 | 2 |

This is a list of main career statistics of American professional tennis player Ben Shelton. All statistics are according to the ATP Tour and ITF websites.

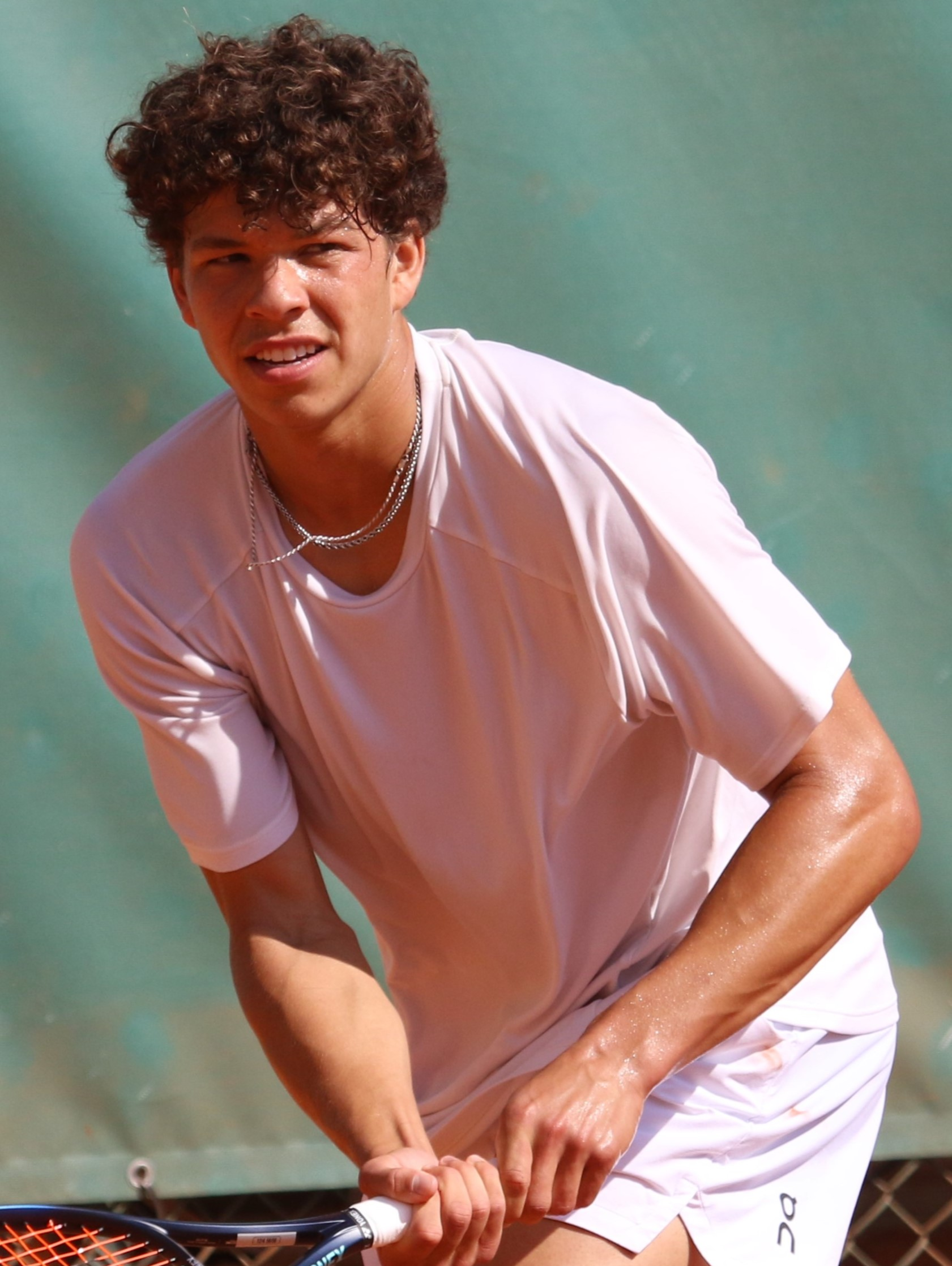
Shelton at the 2023 Monte-Carlo Masters

== Performance timelines ==
Key
| W | F | SF | QF | #R | RR | Q# | DNQ | A | NH |

(W) winner; (F) finalist; (SF) semifinalist; (QF) quarterfinalist; (#R) rounds 4, 3, 2, 1; (RR) round-robin stage; (Q#) qualification round; (DNQ) did not qualify; (A) absent; (NH) not held; (SR) strike rate (events won / competed); (W–L) win–loss record.
To avoid confusion and double counting, these charts are updated at the conclusion of a tournament or when the player's participation has ended.

=== Singles ===
Current through the 2026 ATP Finals.

| Tournament | 2021 | 2022 | 2023 | 2024 | 2025 | 2026 | SR | W–L | Win % |
|---|---|---|---|---|---|---|---|---|---|
Grand Slam tournaments
| Australian Open | A | A | QF | 3R | SF | QF | 0 / 4 | 15–4 | 79% |
| French Open | A | A | 1R | 3R | 4R (Note: Shelton received a walkover in the second round, which does not count as a win.) | 2R | 0 / 4 | 5–4 | 56% |
| Wimbledon | A | A | 2R | 4R | QF | 1R | 0 / 4 | 8–4 | 67% |
| US Open | Q2 | 1R | SF | 3R | 3R | F | 0 / 5 | 15–5 | 75% |
| Win–loss | 0–0 | 0–1 | 10–4 | 9–4 | 13–4 | 11–4 | 0 / 17 | 43–17 | 72% |
Year-end championships
| ATP Finals | Did not qualify | | | | RR | SF | 0 / 2 | 2–5 | 29% |
National representation
| Davis Cup | A | A | A | QF | A | 2R | 0 / 2 | 0–3 | 0% |
ATP 1000 tournaments
| Indian Wells Open | A | A | 2R | 4R | QF | 3R | 0 / 4 | 7–4 | 64% |
| Miami Open | A | A | 2R | 3R | 2R | 2R | 0 / 4 | 1–4 | 20% |
| Monte-Carlo Masters | A | A | 1R | A | 1R | A | 0 / 2 | 0–2 | 0% |
| Madrid Open | A | A | 2R | 3R | 3R | 2R | 0 / 4 | 2–4 | 33% |
| Italian Open | A | A | 2R | 3R | 2R | 2R | 0 / 4 | 1–4 | 20% |
| Canadian Open | A | A | 2R | 2R | W | W | 2 / 4 | 14–2 | 88% |
| Cincinnati Open | A | 3R | 2R | QF | QF | 2R | 0 / 5 | 9–5 | 64% |
| Shanghai Masters | NH | | QF | 4R | 2R | 3R | 0 / 4 | 6–4 | 60% |
| Paris Masters | A | A | 1R | 2R | QF | F | 0 / 4 | 7–4 | 64% |
| Win–loss | 0–0 | 2–1 | 6–9 | 12–8 | 15–8 | 12–7 | 2 / 35 | 47–33 | 59% |
Career statistics
| Tournaments | 0 | 3 | 25 | 25 | 23 | 22 | Career total: 98 | | |
| Titles | 0 | 0 | 1 | 1 | 1 | 4 | Career total: 7 | | |
| Finals | 0 | 0 | 1 | 2 | 2 | 5 | Career total: 10 | | |
| Overall win–loss | 0–0 | 3–3 | 26–24 | 42–26 | 40–24 | 47–21 | 7 / 98 | 158–98 | 62% |
| Year-end ranking | 573 | 96 | 17 | 21 | 9 | | $19,305,644 | | |

=== Doubles ===
| Tournament | 2022 | 2023 | 2024 | 2025 | 2026 | SR | W–L | Win % |
|---|---|---|---|---|---|---|---|---|
Grand Slam tournaments
| Australian Open | A | A | 1R | A | A | 0 / 1 | 0–1 | 0% |
| French Open | A | 2R | A | A | A | 0 / 1 | 1–1 | 50% |
| Wimbledon | A | 1R | 2R | A | A | 0 / 2 | 1–2 | 33% |
| US Open | 2R | 1R | A | A | A | 0 / 2 | 1–2 | 33% |
| Win–loss | 1–1 | 1–3 | 1–2 | 0–0 | 0–0 | 0 / 6 | 3–6 | 33% |
National representation
| Davis Cup | A | A | QF | A | | 0 / 1 | 0–1 | 0% |
ATP 1000 tournaments
| Indian Wells Open | A | 1R | 1R | A | A | 0 / 2 | 0–2 | 0% |
| Miami Open | A | QF | 2R | 1R | A | 0 / 3 | 3–3 | 50% |
| Monte-Carlo Masters | A | 1R | A | QF | A | 0 / 2 | 2–2 | 50% |
| Madrid Open | A | 1R | A | 2R | A | 0 / 2 | 1–2 | 33% |
| Italian Open | A | 2R | SF | A | A | 0 / 2 | 4–2 | 67% |
| Canadian Open | A | A | 2R | QF | A | 0 / 2 | 3–1 | 75% |
| Cincinnati Open | A | QF | A | A | A | 0 / 1 | 2–1 | 67% |
| Shanghai Masters | NH | 1R | 1R | A | 1R | 0 / 3 | 0–3 | 0% |
| Paris Masters | A | A | 1R | A | | 0 / 1 | 0–1 | 0% |
| Win–loss | 0–0 | 5–7 | 5–6 | 5–3 | 0–1 | 0 / 18 | 15–17 | 47% |
Career statistics
| Tournaments | 1 | 16 | 15 | 10 | 6 | Career total: 48 | | |
| Titles | 0 | 0 | 0 | 0 | 1 | Career total: 1 | | |
| Finals | 0 | 1 | 0 | 0 | 1 | Career total: 2 | | |
| Overall win–loss | 1–1 | 12–16 | 14–15 | 8–9 | 7–5 | 1 / 48 | 42–46 | 48% |
| Year-end ranking | 287 | 95 | 101 | 118 | | | | |

== Grand Slam tournaments finals ==
=== Singles: 1 (1 runner-up) ===
| Result | Year | Tournament | Surface | Opponent | Score |
|---|---|---|---|---|---|
| Loss | 2026 | US Open | Hard | (Germany) Alexander Zverev | 3–6, 6–7^{(2–7)}, 7–5, 2–6 |

== Other significant finals ==
=== ATP 1000 tournaments ===
==== Singles: 3 (2 titles, 1 runner-up) ====
| Result | Year | Tournament | Surface | Opponent | Score |
|---|---|---|---|---|---|
| Win | 2025 | Canadian Open | Hard | Karen Khachanov | 6–7^{(5–7)}, 6–4, 7–6^{(7–3)} |
| Win | 2026 | Canadian Open (2) | Hard | (United States) Brandon Nakashima | 6–3, 7–6^{(7–4)} |
| Loss | 2026 | Paris Masters | Hard (i) | (Spain) Carlos Alcaraz | 6–7^{(5–7)}, 5–7 |

== ATP Tour finals ==
=== Singles: 11 (7 titles, 4 runner-ups) ===
| Legend Grand Slam (0–1) ATP Finals (–) ATP 1000 (2–1) ATP 500 (3–2) ATP 250 (2–0) | Finals by surface Hard (4–3) Clay (2–1) Grass (1–0) | Finals by setting Outdoor (6–2) Indoor (1–2) |

| Result | W–L | Date | Tournament | Tier | Surface | Opponent | Score |
|---|---|---|---|---|---|---|---|
| Win | 1–0 | Oct 2023 | Japan Open, Japan | ATP 500 | Hard | Aslan Karatsev | 7–5, 6–1 |
| Win | 2–0 | Apr 2024 | U.S. Men's C.C. Championships, US | ATP 250 | Clay | (United States) Frances Tiafoe | 7–5, 4–6, 6–3 |
| Loss | 2–1 | Oct 2024 | Swiss Indoors, Switzerland | ATP 500 | Hard (i) | (France) Giovanni Mpetshi Perricard | 4–6, 6–7^{(4–7)} |
| Loss | 2–2 | Apr 2025 | BMW Open, Germany | ATP 500 | Clay | (Germany) Alexander Zverev | 2–6, 4–6 |
| Win | 3–2 | Aug 2025 | Canadian Open, Canada | ATP 1000 | Hard | Karen Khachanov | 6–7^{(5–7)}, 6–4, 7–6^{(7–3)} |
| Win | 4–2 | Feb 2026 | Dallas Open, US | ATP 500 | Hard (i) | (United States) Taylor Fritz | 3–6, 6–3, 7–5 |
| Win | 5–2 | Apr 2026 | BMW Open, Germany | ATP 500 | Clay | (Italy) Flavio Cobolli | 6–2, 7–5 |
| Win | 6–2 | Jun 2026 | Stuttgart Open, Germany | ATP 250 | Grass | (United States) Taylor Fritz | 6–4, 2–6, 6–4 |
| Win | 7–2 | Aug 2026 | Canadian Open, Canada (2) | ATP 1000 | Hard | (United States) Brandon Nakashima | 6–3, 7–6^{(7–4)} |
| Loss | 7–3 | Sep 2026 | US Open, US | Grand Slam | Hard | (Germany) Alexander Zverev | 3–6, 6–7^{(2–7)}, 7–5, 2–6 |
| Loss | 7–4 | Nov 2026 | Paris Masters, France | ATP 1000 | Hard (i) | (Spain) Carlos Alcaraz | 6–7^{(5–7)}, 5–7 |

=== Doubles: 2 (1 title, 1 runner-up) ===
| Legend Grand Slam (–) ATP 1000 (–) ATP 500 (0–1) ATP 250 (1–0) | Finals by surface Hard (0–1) Clay (1–0) Grass (–) | Finals by setting Outdoor (1–1) Indoor (–) |

| Result | W–L | Date | Tournament | Tier | Surface | Partner | Opponents | Score |
|---|---|---|---|---|---|---|---|---|
| Loss | 0–1 | Jul 2023 | Washington Open, US | ATP 500 | Hard | (United States) Mackenzie McDonald | (Argentina) Máximo González (Argentina) Andrés Molteni | 7–6^{(7–4)}, 2–6, [6–10] |
| Win | 1–1 | Apr 2026 | U.S. Men's Clay Court Championships, US | ATP 250 | Clay | (Ecuador) Andrés Andrade | (Brazil) Orlando Luz (Brazil) Rafael Matos | 4–6, 6–3, [10–6] |

== ATP Challenger and ITF Tour finals ==
=== Singles: 7 (4 titles, 3 runner-ups) ===
| Legend ATP Challenger Tour (3–3) ITF WTT (1–0) | Finals by surface Hard (4–3) Clay (–) |

| Result | W–L | Date | Tournament | Tier | Surface | Opponent | Score |
|---|---|---|---|---|---|---|---|
| Loss | 0–1 | Jul 2022 | Georgia's Rome Challenger, US | Challenger | Hard (i) | (China) Wu Yibing | 5–7, 3–6 |
| Loss | 0–2 | Aug 2022 | Chicago Men's Challenger, US | Challenger | Hard | Roman Safiullin | 3–6, 6–4, 5–7 |
| Loss | 0–3 | Oct 2022 | Tiburon Challenger, US | Challenger | Hard | (United States) Zachary Svajda | 6–2, 2–6, 4–6 |
| Win | 1–3 | Oct 2022 | Charlottesville Men's Pro Challenger, US | Challenger | Hard (i) | (United States) Christopher Eubanks | 7–6^{(7–4)}, 7–5 |
| Win | 2–3 | Nov 2022 | Knoxville Challenger, US | Challenger | Hard (i) | (United States) Christopher Eubanks | 6–3, 1–6, 7–6^{(7–4)} |
| Win | 3–3 | Nov 2022 | Champaign–Urbana Challenger, US | Challenger | Hard (i) | (Australia) Aleksandar Vukic | 0–6, 6–3, 6–2 |

| Result | W–L | Date | Tournament | Tier | Surface | Opponent | Score |
|---|---|---|---|---|---|---|---|
| Win | 1–0 | Jul 2021 | M25 Champaign, US | WTT | Hard | (Netherlands) Gijs Brouwer | 7–6^{(7–4)}, 6–3 |

=== Doubles: 2 (1 title, 1 runner-up) ===
| Legend ATP Challenger Tour (–) ITF WTT (1–1) |

| Result | W–L | Date | Tournament | Tier | Surface | Partner | Opponents | Score |
|---|---|---|---|---|---|---|---|---|
| Win | 1–0 | Jul 2021 | M25 Champaign, US | WTT | Hard | (United States) Eliot Spizzirri | (South Korea) Chung Yun-seong (Japan) Rio Noguchi | 6–4, 6–0 |
| Loss | 1–1 | Oct 2021 | M15 Vero Beach, US | WTT | Clay | (Canada) Liam Draxl | (Denmark) Johannes Ingildsen (Portugal) Duarte Vale | 3–6, 4–6 |

== Career Grand Slam statistics ==
=== Grand Slam tournament seedings ===
The tournaments won by Shelton are in boldface, and advanced into finals by Shelton are in italics.

| Legend seeded No. 1 (0 / 0) seeded No. 2 (0 / 0) seeded No. 3 (0 / 0) seeded No. 4–10 (0 / 6) seeded No. 11–32 (0 / 8) unseeded (0 / 3) | Longest streak 0 0 0 6 6 2 |

| Year | Australian Open | French Open | Wimbledon | US Open |
|---|---|---|---|---|
| 2021 | Did not play | Did not play | Did not play | Did not qualify |
| 2022 | Did not play | Did not play | Did not play | Wild card |
| 2023 | Unseeded | 30th | 32nd | Unseeded |
| 2024 | 16th | 15th | 14th | 13th |
| 2025 | 21st | 13th | 10th | 6th |
| 2026 | 8th | 5th | 4th | 8th (1) |

=== Best Grand Slam tournament results details ===
Grand Slam winners are in boldface, and runner-ups are in italics (at time of matches played).

Australian Open
2025 Australian Open (21st seed)
| Round | Opponent | Rank | Score |
|---|---|---|---|
| 1R | (United States) Brandon Nakashima | 35 | 7–6^{(7–3)}, 7–5, 7–5 |
| 2R | (Spain) Pablo Carreño Busta (PR) | 182 | 6–3, 6–3, 6–7^{(4–7)}, 6–4 |
| 3R | (Italy) Lorenzo Musetti (16) | 15 | 6–3, 3–6, 6–4, 7–6^{(7–5)} |
| 4R | (France) Gaël Monfils | 41 | 7–6^{(7–3)}, 6–7^{(3–7)}, 7–6^{(7–2)}, 1–0 ret. |
| QF | (Italy) Lorenzo Sonego | 55 | 6–4, 7–5, 4–6, 7–6^{(7–4)} |
| SF | **(Italy) Jannik Sinner (1)** | **1** | 6–7^{(2–7)}, 2–6, 2–6 |

Wimbledon
2025 Wimbledon (10th seed)
| Round | Opponent | Rank | Score |
|---|---|---|---|
| 1R | (Australia) Alex Bolt (Q) | 179 | 6–4, 7–6^{(7–1)}, 7–6^{(7–4)} |
| 2R | (Australia) Rinky Hijikata | 87 | 6–2, 7–5, 6–4 |
| 3R | (Hungary) Márton Fucsovics (LL) | 105 | 6–3, 7–6^{(7–4)}, 6–2 |
| 4R | (Italy) Lorenzo Sonego | 47 | 3–6, 6–1, 7–6^{(7–1)}, 7–5 |
| QF | **(Italy) Jannik Sinner (1)** | **1** | 6–7^{(2–7)}, 4–6, 4–6 |

French Open
2025 French Open (13th seed)
| Round | Opponent | Rank | Score |
|---|---|---|---|
| 1R | (Italy) Lorenzo Sonego | 44 | 6–4, 4–6, 3–6, 6–2, 6–3 |
| 2R | (France) Hugo Gaston | 83 | Walkover |
| 3R | (Italy) Matteo Gigante (Q) | 167 | 6–3, 6–3, 6–4 |
| 4R | **(Spain) Carlos Alcaraz (2)** | 2 | 6–7^{(8–10)}, 3–6, 6–4, 4–6 |

US Open
2026 US Open (8th seed)
| Round | Opponent | Rank | Score |
|---|---|---|---|
| 1R | (Netherlands) Tallon Griekspoor | 56 | 1–6, 6–1, 7–6^{(7–3)}, 6–2 |
| 2R | (Poland) Hubert Hurkacz | 47 | 6–3, 5–7, 7–6^{(7–3)}, 7–5 |
| 3R | (Canada) Denis Shapovalov | 48 | 7–6^{(7–3)}, 6–7^{(5–7)}, 6–3, 6–4 |
| 4R | (Greece) Stefanos Tsitsipas | 53 | 6–2, 6–3, 6–4 |
| QF | (Spain) Carlos Alcaraz (2) | 3 | 6–7^{(5–7)}, 6–1, 6–3, 1–6, 7–6^{(10–7)} |
| SF | (United States) Frances Tiafoe (11) | 12 | 4–6, 6–3, 6–3, 7–5 |
| F | **(Germany) Alexander Zverev (1)** | 2 | 3–6, 6–7^{(5–7)}, 7–5, 2–6 |

== National and international representation ==
=== Team competitions finals: 2 (1 title, 1 runner-up) ===
| Finals by tournaments Davis Cup (–) United Cup (–) Laver Cup (1–1) | Finals by teams United States (–) World (1–1) |

| Result | Date | W–L | Tournament | Surface | Team | Partners | Opponent team | Opponent players | Score |
|---|---|---|---|---|---|---|---|---|---|
| Win | Sep 2023 | 1–0 | Laver Cup, Vancouver, Canada | Hard (i) | Team World | Taylor Fritz; Frances Tiafoe; Tommy Paul; Félix Auger-Aliassime; Francisco Cerúndolo | Team Europe | Andrey Rublev; Casper Ruud; Hubert Hurkacz; Alejandro Davidovich Fokina; Arthur Fils; Gaël Monfils | 13–2 |
| Loss | Sep 2024 | 1–1 | Laver Cup, Berlin, Germany | Hard (i) | Team World | Taylor Fritz; Frances Tiafoe; Alejandro Tabilo; Francisco Cerúndolo; Thanasi Kokkinakis | Team Europe | Carlos Alcaraz; Alexander Zverev; Daniil Medvedev; Casper Ruud; Stefanos Tsitsipas; Grigor Dimitrov | 11–13 |

== Wins over top 10 players ==
- Shelton has a 12–27 (27.27%) win-loss record against players who were, at the time the match was played, ranked in the top 10.

| Season | 2022 | 2023 | 2024 | 2025 | 2026 | Total |
|---|---|---|---|---|---|---|
| Wins | 1 | 2 | 2 | 2 | 5 | 12 |

| # | Player | Rk | Event | Surface | Rd | Score | Rk | Ref |
|---|---|---|---|---|---|---|---|---|
2022
| 1. | (Norway) Casper Ruud | 5 | Cincinnati Open, United States | Hard | 2R | 6–3, 6–3 | 229 | |
2023
| 2. | (United States) Frances Tiafoe | 10 | US Open, United States | Hard | QF | 6–2, 3–6, 7–6^{(9–7)}, 6–2 | 47 | |
| 3. | (Italy) Jannik Sinner | 4 | Shanghai Masters, China | Hard | 4R | 2–6, 6–3, 7–6^{(7–5)} | 20 | |
2024
| 4. | Daniil Medvedev | 5 | Laver Cup, Germany | Hard (i) | RR | 6–7^{(6–8)}, 7–5, [10–7] | 17 | |
| 5. | Andrey Rublev | 7 | Swiss Indoors, Switzerland | Hard (i) | QF | 7–5, 6–7^{(3–7)}, 6–4 | 23 | |
2025
| 6. | (Australia) Alex de Minaur | 8 | Canadian Open, Canada | Hard | QF | 6–3, 6–4 | 7 | |
| 7. | (United States) Taylor Fritz | 4 | Canadian Open, Canada | Hard | SF | 6–4, 6–3 | 7 | |
2026
| 8. | (United States) Taylor Fritz | 7 | Dallas Open, United States | Hard (i) | F | 3–6, 6–3, 7–5 | 9 | |
| 9. | (United States) Taylor Fritz | 9 | Stuttgart Open, Germany | Grass | F | 6–4, 2–6, 6–4 | 5 | |
| 10. | (Spain) Carlos Alcaraz | 3 | US Open, United States | Hard | QF | 6–7^{(5–7)}, 6–1, 6–3, 1–6, 7–6^{(10–7)} | 9 | |
| 11. | (France) Arthur Fils | 7 | ATP Finals, Italy | Hard | RR | 6–2, 3–6, 6–3 | 4 | |
| 12. | (Spain) Rafael Jódar | 10 | ATP Finals, Italy | Hard (i) | RR | 7–6^{(10–8)}, 7–5 | 4 | |

*As of November 19, 2026

== Exhibition matches ==
=== Singles ===
| Result | Date | Tournament | Surface | Opponent | Score |
|---|---|---|---|---|---|
| Loss | Dec 2024 | The Garden Cup, New York, US | Hard | (Spain) Carlos Alcaraz | 6–4, 2–6, [4–7] |
| Loss | Jun 2025 | Giorgio Armani Tennis Classic, London, UK | Grass | (Argentina) Tomás Martín Etcheverry | 6–7^{(3–7)}, 6–7^{(2–7)} |
| Win | Dec 2025 | The Atlanta Cup, Atlanta, US | Hard (i) | (Australia) Nick Kyrgios | 7–6^{(7–1)}, 6–3 |

== See also ==
- United States Davis Cup team
- Fastest recorded tennis serves
