= 2023 Miami Open =

- Date: March 21 – April 2
- Edition: 38th
- Category: ATP Masters 1000 (ATP); WTA 1000 (WTA)
- Draw: 96S / 48Q / 32D
- Prize money: $8,800,000 (ATP) $8,800,000 (WTA)
- Surface: Hard - outdoor
- Location: Miami Gardens, Florida, United States
- Venue: Hard Rock Stadium

Champions

Men's singles
- Daniil Medvedev

Women's singles
- (Czech Republic) Petra Kvitová

Men's doubles
- (Mexico) Santiago González / (France) Édouard Roger-Vasselin

Women's doubles
- (United States) Coco Gauff / (United States) Jessica Pegula
- Miami Open

The 2023 Miami Open was a professional hardcourt tennis tournament played from March 21 to April 2, 2023, on the grounds of Hard Rock Stadium in Miami Gardens, Florida in the United States. It was the 38th edition of the men's and women's event and was classified as an ATP Masters 1000 event on the 2023 ATP Tour and a WTA 1000 event on the 2023 WTA Tour.

Carlos Alcaraz and Iga Świątek were the defending champions in the men's and women's singles draw, respectively. However, Świątek withdrew before the tournament began due to injury. This was the second consecutive year that the reigning women's singles champion pulled out from the tournament. Alcaraz lost in the semifinals to Jannik Sinner.

== Finals ==
=== Men's singles ===
- Daniil Medvedev defeated (Italy) Jannik Sinner, 7–5, 6–3.

This was Medvedev's 19th ATP Tour title, and fourth of the year.

=== Women's singles ===
- (Czech Republic) Petra Kvitová defeated (Kazakhstan) Elena Rybakina, 7–6^{(16–14)}, 6–2.

This was Kvitová's 30th WTA Tour title, and her first of the year.

=== Men's doubles ===
- (Mexico) Santiago González / (France) Édouard Roger-Vasselin defeated (United States) Austin Krajicek / (France) Nicolas Mahut, 7–6^{(7–4)}, 7–5.

=== Women's doubles ===
- (United States) Coco Gauff / (United States) Jessica Pegula defeated (Canada) Leylah Fernandez / (United States) Taylor Townsend, 7–6^{(8–6)}, 6–2.

== Points and prize money ==
=== Point distribution ===
Event	W	F	SF	QF	R16	R32	R64	R128	Q	Q2	Q1
Men's singles	1000	600	360	180	90	45	25*	10	16	8	0
Men's doubles	1000	600	360	180	90	0	—N/a	—N/a	—N/a	—N/a	—N/a
Women's singles	1000	650	390	215	120	65	35*	10	30	20	2
Women's doubles	1000	650	390	215	120	10	—N/a	—N/a	—N/a	—N/a	—N/a

* Players with byes receive first round points.

=== Prize money ===
Event	W	F	SF	QF	R16	R32	R64	R128	Q2	Q1
Men's singles	$1,262,220	$662,360	$352,635	$184,465	$96,955	$55,770	$30,885	$18,660	$9,440	$5,150
Women's singles	$1,262,220	$662,360	$352,635	$184,465	$96,955	$55,770	$30,885	$18,660	$9,440	$5,150
Men's doubles*	$436,730	$231,660	$123,550	$62,630	$33,460	$18,020	—N/a	—N/a	—N/a	—N/a
Women's doubles*	$436,730	$231,660	$123,550	$62,630	$33,460	$18,020	—N/a	—N/a	—N/a	—N/a

*Players with byes receive first round points

== See also ==
- 2023 ATP Tour
- ATP Tour Masters 1000
- List of ATP Tour top-level tournament singles champions
- Tennis Masters Series records and statistics
- 2023 WTA Tour
- WTA 1000 tournaments
- WTA Premier Mandatory/5
- List of WTA Tour top-level tournament singles champions
