= 2024 Miami Open – Men's doubles =

Men's doubles
- 2024 Miami Open

Final
- Champions: (India) Rohan Bopanna (Australia) Matthew Ebden
- Runners-up: (Croatia) Ivan Dodig (United States) Austin Krajicek
- Score: 6–7^{(3–7)}, 6–3, [10–6]

Events
Singles	men	women
Doubles	men	women
← 2023 ·	Miami Open	· 2025 →

Rohan Bopanna and Matthew Ebden defeated Ivan Dodig and Austin Krajicek in the final, 6–7^{(3–7)}, 6–3, [10–6] to win the men's doubles tennis title at the 2024 Miami Open. It was their second Masters 1000 title as a pair, Bopanna's sixth, and Ebden's second overall. At the age of 44, Bopanna extended his own record as the oldest Masters finalist and champion in history. Bopanna also regained the ATP No. 1 doubles ranking after reaching the final; Dodig, Wesley Koolhof, Joe Salisbury and Horacio Zeballos were also in contention at the start of the tournament.

Santiago González and Édouard Roger-Vasselin were the defending champions, but chose not to participate together. González partnered Neal Skupski, but lost in the first round to Marcelo Melo and Roger-Vasselin. Melo and Roger-Vasselin then lost in the quarterfinals to Dodig and Krajicek.

== Seeds ==
1. (India) Rohan Bopanna / (Australia) Matthew Ebden (champions)
2. (Croatia) Ivan Dodig / (United States) Austin Krajicek (final)
3. (United States) Rajeev Ram / (United Kingdom) Joe Salisbury (quarterfinals)
4. (Spain) Marcel Granollers / (Argentina) Horacio Zeballos (semifinals)
5. (Mexico) Santiago González / (United Kingdom) Neal Skupski (first round)
6. (Argentina) Máximo González / (Argentina) Andrés Molteni (first round)
7. (Germany) Kevin Krawietz / (Germany) Tim Pütz (semifinals)
8. (Netherlands) Wesley Koolhof / (Croatia) Nikola Mektić (second round)

== Draw ==
=== Key ===
- Q = Qualifier
- WC = Wild card
- LL = Lucky loser
- Alt = Alternate
- ITF = ITF entry
- PR = Protected ranking
- SR = Special ranking
- SE = Special exempt
- JE = Junior exempt
- JR = Junior Accelerator Programme entrant
- CO = College Accelerator Programme entrant
- NG = Next Gen Accelerator Program entrant
- w/o = Walkover
- r = Retired
- d = Defaulted

=== Finals ===
Semifinals
1	(India) Rohan Bopanna (Australia) Matthew Ebden	6	6
4	(Spain) Marcel Granollers (Argentina) Horacio Zeballos	1	4
7	(Germany) Kevin Krawietz (Germany) Tim Pütz	4	7^{7}	[7]
2	(Croatia) Ivan Dodig (United States) Austin Krajicek	6	6^{4}	[10]

Final
1	(India) Rohan Bopanna (Australia) Matthew Ebden	6^{3}	6	[10]
2	(Croatia) Ivan Dodig (United States) Austin Krajicek	7^{7}	3	[6]

=== Top half ===
First round
1	(India) R Bopanna (Australia) M Ebden	4	7^{7}	[10]
(Italy) S Bolelli (Italy) A Vavassori	6	6^{4}	[4]
(Monaco) H Nys (Poland) J Zieliński	7^{7}	7^{7}
(Belgium) S Gillé (Belgium) J Vliegen	6^{5}	6^{2}
Alt	(Australia) J-P Smith (Netherlands) S Verbeek	7^{10}	4	[10]
(Kazakhstan) A Bublik (Austria) S Ofner	6^{8}	6	[5]
(Austria) A Erler (Austria) L Miedler	2	2
8	(Netherlands) W Koolhof (Croatia) N Mektić	6	6
4	(Spain) M Granollers (Argentina) H Zeballos	3	6	[10]
(France) S Doumbia (France) F Reboul	6	3	[5]
(Finland) H Heliövaara (Australia) J Peers	6^{4}	6^{6}
(El Salvador) M Arévalo (Croatia) M Pavić	7^{7}	7^{8}
(France) A Mannarino (France) F Martin	3	6^{6}
(United Kingdom) L Glasspool (Netherlands) J-J Rojer	6	7^{8}
(United States) N Lammons (United States) J Withrow	4	7^{8}	[10]
6	(Argentina) M González (Argentina) A Molteni	6	6^{6}	[4]

Second round
1	(India) R Bopanna (Australia) M Ebden	7	7^{7}
(Monaco) H Nys (Poland) J Zieliński	5	6^{3}
Alt	(Australia) J-P Smith (Netherlands) S Verbeek	6	6
8	(Netherlands) W Koolhof (Croatia) N Mektić	3	3
4	(Spain) M Granollers (Argentina) H Zeballos	7	6
(El Salvador) M Arévalo (Croatia) M Pavić	5	3
(United Kingdom) L Glasspool (Netherlands) J-J Rojer	7^{7}	6
(United States) N Lammons (United States) J Withrow	6^{4}	4

Quarterfinals
1	(India) R Bopanna (Australia) M Ebden	3	7^{7}	[10]
Alt	(Australia) J-P Smith (Netherlands) S Verbeek	6	6^{4}	[7]
4	(Spain) M Granollers (Argentina) H Zeballos	7^{7}	3	[12]
(United Kingdom) L Glasspool (Netherlands) J-J Rojer	6^{4}	6	[10]

Semifinals
1	(India) R Bopanna (Australia) M Ebden	6	6
4	(Spain) M Granollers (Argentina) H Zeballos	1	4

=== Bottom half ===
First round
7	(Germany) K Krawietz (Germany) T Pütz	2	6	[10]
(Argentina) F Cerúndolo (Argentina) TM Etcheverry	6	3	[7]
(United Kingdom) J Cash (Netherlands) T Griekspoor	5	4
WC	(United States) S Korda (United Kingdom) A Murray	7	6
WC	(Australia) T Kokkinakis (Greece) S Tsitsipas	6	6
(Australia) A de Minaur (Australia) R Hijikata	3	4
WC	(United States) W Blumberg (Norway) C Ruud	6^{5}	4
3	(United States) R Ram (United Kingdom) J Salisbury	7^{7}	6
5	(Mexico) S González (United Kingdom) N Skupski	4	4
(Brazil) M Melo (France) É Roger-Vasselin	6	6
(United States) C Eubanks (United States) B Shelton	7	6
(Netherlands) R Haase (Germany) A Mies	5	3
(Uruguay) A Behar (Czech Republic) A Pavlásek	4	5
(Australia) M Purcell (Australia) J Thompson	6	7
(India) Y Bhambri (New Zealand) M Venus	6^{5}	4
2	(Croatia) I Dodig (United States) A Krajicek	7^{7}	6

Second round
7	(Germany) K Krawietz (Germany) T Pütz	w/o
WC	(United States) S Korda (United Kingdom) A Murray
WC	(Australia) T Kokkinakis (Greece) S Tsitsipas	5	6^{4}
3	(United States) R Ram (United Kingdom) J Salisbury	7	7^{7}
(Brazil) M Melo (France) É Roger-Vasselin	6^{5}	7	[10]
(United States) C Eubanks (United States) B Shelton	7^{7}	5	[8]
(Australia) M Purcell (Australia) J Thompson	3	2
2	(Croatia) I Dodig (United States) A Krajicek	6	6

Quarterfinals
7	(Germany) K Krawietz (Germany) T Pütz	6	6^{5}	[10]
3	(United States) R Ram (United Kingdom) J Salisbury	3	7^{7}	[7]
(Brazil) M Melo (France) É Roger-Vasselin	6^{1}	6^{4}
2	(Croatia) I Dodig (United States) A Krajicek	7^{7}	7^{7}

Semifinals
7	(Germany) K Krawietz (Germany) T Pütz	4	7^{7}	[7]
2	(Croatia) I Dodig (United States) A Krajicek	6	6^{4}	[10]

== Seeded teams ==
The following are the seeded teams. Seedings are based on ATP rankings as of March 18, 2024.

Country	Player	Country	Player	Rank	Seed
IND	Rohan Bopanna	AUS	Matthew Ebden	5	1
CRO	Ivan Dodig	USA	Austin Krajicek	6	2
USA	Rajeev Ram	GBR	Joe Salisbury	13	3
ESP	Marcel Granollers	ARG	Horacio Zeballos	17	4
MEX	Santiago González	GBR	Neal Skupski	21	5
ARG	Máximo González	ARG	Andrés Molteni	28	6
GER	Kevin Krawietz	GER	Tim Pütz	29	7
NED	Wesley Koolhof	CRO	Nikola Mektić	30	8

== Other entry information ==
=== Wildcards ===
- (United States) William Blumberg / (Norway) Casper Ruud
- (Australia) Thanasi Kokkinakis / (Greece) Stefanos Tsitsipas
- (United States) Sebastian Korda / (United Kingdom) Andy Murray

=== Alternates ===
- (Australia) John-Patrick Smith / (Netherlands) Sem Verbeek

=== Withdrawals ===
- (Australia) Alex de Minaur / (Australia) Alexei Popyrin → replaced by (Australia) Alex de Minaur / (Australia) Rinky Hijikata
- (France) Nicolas Mahut / (France) Édouard Roger-Vasselin → replaced by (Austria) Alexander Erler / (Austria) Lucas Miedler
- (Brazil) Marcelo Melo / (Germany) Alexander Zverev → replaced by (Brazil) Marcelo Melo / (France) Édouard Roger-Vasselin
- (United Kingdom) Jamie Murray / (New Zealand) Michael Venus → replaced by (India) Yuki Bhambri / (New Zealand) Michael Venus
- (United States) Tommy Paul / (United States) Frances Tiafoe → replaced by (Australia) John-Patrick Smith / (Netherlands) Sem Verbeek
