= Austin Krajicek =

American tennis player (born 1990)

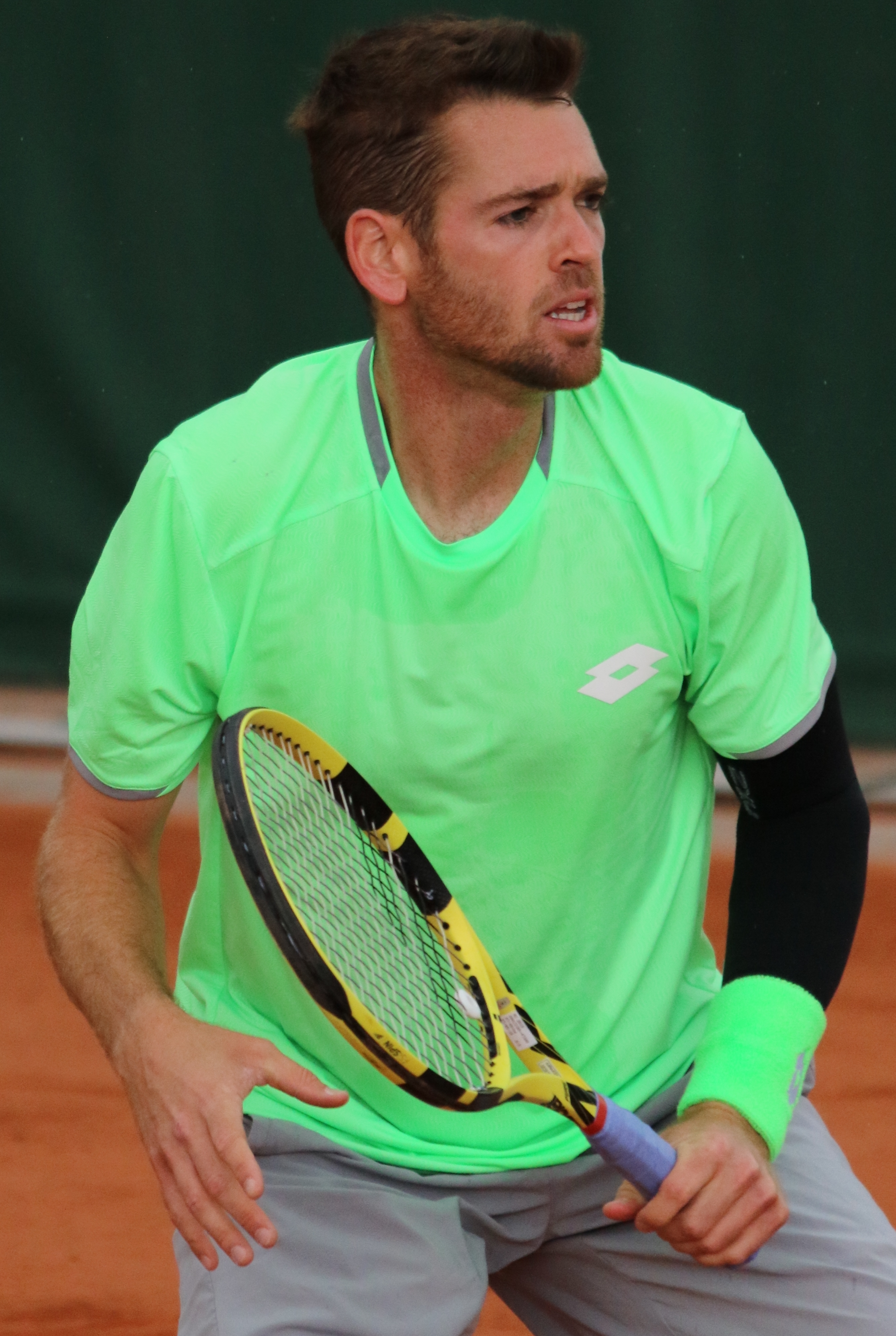
- Krajicek at the 2019 French Open
- Country (sports): United States
- Residence: Plano, Texas, U.S.
- Born: June 16, 1990 (age 36) Tampa, Florida, U.S.
- Height: 6 ft 2 in (1.88 m)
- Turned pro: 2012
- Plays: Left-handed (two-handed backhand)
- College: Texas A&M University
- Coach: Philip Farmer, Rob Morgan
- Prize money: US $4,469,286

Singles
- Career record: 12–24
- Career titles: 0
- Highest ranking: No. 94 (October 26, 2015)

Grand Slam singles results
- Australian Open: 2R (2016)
- French Open: Q1 (2014, 2015)
- Wimbledon: Q3 (2016)
- US Open: 2R (2015)

Doubles
- Career record: 271–208
- Career titles: 16
- Highest ranking: No. 1 (June 12, 2023)
- Current ranking: No. 34 (August 31, 2026)

Grand Slam doubles results
- Australian Open: 3R (2020, 2025, 2026)
- French Open: W (2023)
- Wimbledon: QF (2026)
- US Open: SF (2023)

Other doubles tournaments
- Tour Finals: RR (2022, 2023)
- Olympic Games: F (2024)

Grand Slam mixed doubles results
- Australian Open: 1R (2020, 2022, 2023)
- French Open: 2R (2019)
- Wimbledon: 1R (2021, 2022, 2024)
- US Open: F (2023)
Olympic medal record
Men's tennis
Representing United States
Olympic Games
| Silver medal – second place | 2024 Paris | Men's doubles |
- Last updated on: September 1, 2026.

Austin Krajicek (/ˈkraɪtʃɛk/ KRYE-chek; born June 16, 1990) is an American professional tennis player who specializes in doubles. He has been ranked as high as world No. 1 in doubles by the Association of Tennis Professionals (ATP) in June 2023. He also reached a best singles ranking of No. 94 in October 2015.

Krajicek has won 16 doubles titles on the ATP Tour. Since partnering with Ivan Dodig in 2021, Krajicek has won one ATP 1000 title at 2023 Monte Carlo Masters, and his first major title at the 2023 French Open, a victory that crowned him the ATP world No. 1 in June 2023.

A former player for Texas A&M University, Krajicek won the national doubles title at the 2011 NCAA Division I Tennis Championships, the first in the program's history. He turned professional in 2012 and made his top 100 singles debut in 2015, a year in which he made the quarterfinals of the ATP 500 in Tokyo and broke through on the major level by reaching the second round of the US Open.

== Personal life ==
Krajicek is a distant cousin of Dutch tennis player and former Wimbledon champion Richard Krajicek and his sister Michaëlla Krajicek.

== College ==
Krajicek attended Texas A&M University from 2008 to 2011. He won the doubles title with Jeff Dadamo at the 2011 NCAA Division I Tennis Championships, which was the first national title in program history.

He was a four-time doubles All-American (2008–11), and a two-time singles All-American (2010 & 2011). Krajicek was the Big 12 Freshman of the Year, and in his junior and senior seasons was the Big 12 Player of the Year.

== Professional career ==
=== 2012–2017: Early years ===
Prior to 2018 Krajicek competed mainly on the ITF Futures and ATP Challenger Tour, both in singles and doubles.

He won his second doubles match (the first was in 2013 with Denis Kudla) at the 2017 US Open with partner Jackson Withrow by defeating Philipp Oswald and André Sá in the first round.

=== 2018–2020: First ATP title, top 50 debut ===
Krajicek reached the quarterfinals of the 2018 US Open doubles tournament partnering Tennys Sandgren, his best showing at a Grand Slam in doubles. He entered the top 50 in doubles reaching a career-high of No. 44 on October 22, 2018. He later reached the top 40 with a career-high of World No. 35 on May 27, 2019.

He reached the third round of the 2020 Australian Open partnering Franko Škugor and the pair also won the title at the 2020 Austrian Open in Kitzbühel.

=== 2021: Masters final, Olympic semifinalist, new partner Dodig ===
Partnering Vasek Pospisil, he reached his tenth final at the 2021 Hall of Fame Open where he lost to fellow Americans Jack Sock and William Blumberg.

At the Olympics, he reached the semifinals partnering again with Tennys Sandgren where they lost to eventual champions Mate Pavic and Nikola Mektic. The pair lost in the bronze medal match to the New Zealand pair of Marcus Daniell and Michael Venus.

Partnering with Steve Johnson, he reached his first Masters 1000 final at the 2021 Western & Southern Open in Cincinnati, defeating Colombian pair Juan Sebastián Cabal and Robert Farah in a tight three-set match. The pair last competed at the 2020 edition of the Cincinnati Masters where they reached the semifinals.

With new partner Ivan Dodig, he reached the final at the 2021 Winston-Salem Open.

=== 2022: First major final, world No. 9, ATP finals ===
He won the title at the 2022 ATP Lyon Open with Ivan Dodig, their first as a team.

At the 2022 French Open, he reached the first major final in his career, partnering with Dodig and defeating top seeds Joe Salisbury and Rajeev Ram in the quarterfinals. They lost to Marcelo Arevalo and Jean Julien Rojer in the final. As a result, he made his debut in the top 25 and became the American No. 2 player after Rajeev Ram.

At Halle and Eastbourne, he reached the semifinals with Dodig. As a result, he reached world No. 19 in the doubles rankings on June 27, and a couple of weeks later the top 15 on July 11.

At the ATP 500 Washington Open, he reached his 15th final, and then his 16th at the 2022 Firenze Open defeating Nicolas Mahut and Édouard Roger-Vasselin. At the 2022 Tennis Napoli Cup, he won his second title with Dodig as a team, defeating home favorites Lorenzo Sonego and Andrea Vavassori to reach their fifth final of 2022 and Australian duo Matthew Ebden and John Peers in the final. He reached his third straight and sixth final for the season with Dodig at the ATP 500 2022 Swiss Indoors in Basel, defeating top seeds Arevalo/Rojer and the Kazakhstani duo of Andrey Golubev and Aleksandr Nedovyesov en route. The team won their third title together by defeating Mahut/Roger-Vasselin.

At the Paris Masters, Krajicek and Dodig reached the semifinals, defeating Belgian pair Sander Gille/Joran Vliegen and top seeds Rajeev Ram/Joe Salisbury to reach their seventh final for the season. On 5 November, the pair qualified for the 2022 ATP Finals after defeating German duo Kevin Krawietz and Andreas Mies to reach their seventh final of 2022 as a team. Krajicek reached world No. 9 in the rankings on November 7, 2022 and finished the year ranked No. 10 on November 21, 2022.

=== 2023: First major title, year-end world No. 1 ===
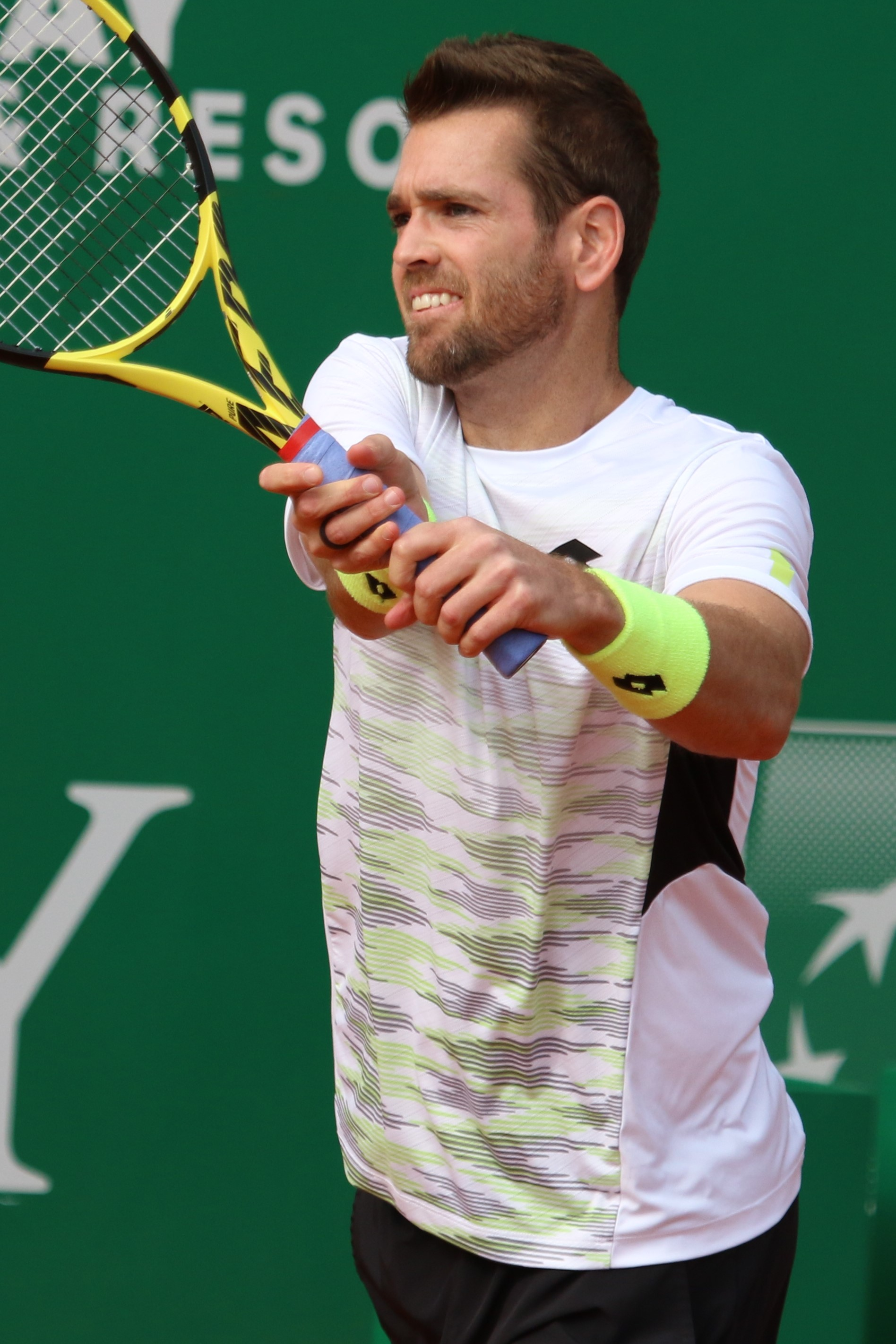
Krajicek at the 2023 Monte-Carlo Masters

Krajicek reached his third Masters final at the Miami Open with Nicolas Mahut and fourth at the Monte-Carlo Masters with Dodig, the latter of which they won after defeating Romain Arneodo and Sam Weissborn. As a result Krajicek moved to a new career high of world No. 3 and became the American No. 1 doubles player.

The successful momentum the pair found on clay boosted Krajicek and Dodig to a second consecutive final at the 2023 French Open, where they won their first Major title together, a victory that crowned Krajicek the new World No. 1. He won his second grass court title with Dodig at the 2023 Queen's Club Championships and reclaimed the No. 1 ranking before Wimbledon.

At the US Open he reached the mixed doubles final with compatriot Jessica Pegula. At the same tournament he also made it to the semifinals in doubles with Dodig.

He finished the year as the world No. 1 player for the first time in his career.

=== 2024: Consecutive Miami final, Olympics silver medal ===
At the 2024 BNP Paribas Open, he reached the quarterfinals with Dodig having never gotten past the second round at this Masters. As a result, he reclaimed the world No. 1 ranking replacing Rohan Bopanna. At the 2024 Miami Open he reached the final for a second consecutive year, this time with Dodig, but lost to top seeds Bopanna and Ebden.

As the defending champions with Dodig at the 2024 Monte-Carlo Masters and seeded second, having received a bye in the first round, they lost in the second round to Joran Vliegen and Sander Gille.

He won the silver medal with Rajeev Ram at the Paris Olympics.

== World TeamTennis ==
Krajicek made his World TeamTennis debut in 2020 with the Orange County Breakers at The Greenbrier.

== Performance timelines ==
Key
| W | F | SF | QF | #R | RR | Q# | P# | DNQ | A | Z# | PO | G | S | B | NMS | NTI | P | NH |

(W) winner; (F) finalist; (SF) semifinalist; (QF) quarterfinalist; (#R) rounds 4, 3, 2, 1; (RR) round-robin stage; (Q#) qualification round; (P#) preliminary round; (DNQ) did not qualify; (A) absent; (Z#) Davis/Fed Cup Zonal Group (with number indication) or (PO) play-off; (G) gold, (S) silver or (B) bronze Olympic/Paralympic medal; (NMS) not a Masters tournament; (NTI) not a Tier I tournament; (P) postponed; (NH) not held; (SR) strike rate (events won / competed); (W–L) win–loss record.
To avoid confusion and double counting, these charts are updated at the conclusion of a tournament or when the player's participation has ended.

=== Doubles ===
Current through the 2026 Mexican Open.

| Tournament | 2011 | 2012 | 2013 | 2014 | 2015 | 2016 | 2017 | 2018 | 2019 | 2020 | 2021 | 2022 | 2023 | 2024 | 2025 | SR | W–L | Win% |
|---|---|---|---|---|---|---|---|---|---|---|---|---|---|---|---|---|---|---|
Grand Slam tournaments
| Australian Open | A | A | A | A | 2R | 2R | A | A | 2R | 3R | A | 2R | 1R | 2R | 3R | 0 / 8 | 9–8 | 53% |
| French Open | A | A | A | A | 2R | A | A | A | 1R | 2R | 2R | F | W | 2R | 3R | 1 / 8 | 17–7 | 71% |
| Wimbledon | A | A | A | 2R | A | A | A | 1R | 1R | A | 1R | 3R | 2R | 1R | 1R | 0 / 8 | 4–8 | 33% |
| US Open | 1R | A | 2R | 1R | 1R | 1R | 2R | QF | 2R | 2R | 2R | 2R | SF | 2R | 1R | 0 / 14 | 14–14 | 50% |
| Win–loss | 0–1 | 0–0 | 1–1 | 1–2 | 2–3 | 1–2 | 1–1 | 3–2 | 2–4 | 4–3 | 2–3 | 9–4 | 11–4 | 3–4 | 4-4 | 1 / 38 | 44–37 | 54% |
Olympic Games
| Summer Olympics | NH | A | Not Held | | | A | Not Held | | | | 4th | Not Held | | S | | 0 / 2 | 7–3 | 70% |
Year-end championship
| ATP Finals | Did Not Qualify | | | | | | | | | | | RR | RR | | | 0 / 2 | 1–5 | 17% |
ATP Masters Series
| Indian Wells Masters | A | A | A | A | A | A | A | A | A | NH | 1R | A | 2R | QF | 1R | 0 / 4 | 3–4 | 43% |
| Miami Open | A | A | A | A | A | A | A | A | 1R | NH | 1R | 2R | F | F | 1R | 0 / 6 | 9–6 | 60% |
| Monte-Carlo Masters | A | A | A | A | A | A | A | A | A | NH | A | 1R | W | 2R | A | 1 / 3 | 5–2 | 71% |
| Madrid Open | A | A | A | A | A | A | A | A | 1R | NH | A | A | 1R | 1R | 1R | 0 / 4 | 0–4 | 0% |
| Italian Open | A | A | A | A | A | A | A | A | 2R | 1R | 1R | 1R | 2R | 1R | A | 0 / 6 | 2–6 | 25% |
| Canadian Open | A | A | A | A | A | A | A | A | 2R | NH | 2R | 1R | 2R | A | 2R | 0 / 5 | 4–5 | 44% |
| Cincinnati Masters | A | A | A | A | A | A | A | A | 2R | SF | F | 1R | SF | 1R | 1R | 0 / 7 | 10–7 | 59% |
| Shanghai Masters | A | A | A | A | A | A | A | A | A | Not Held | | | 1R | 2R | QF | 0 / 3 | 3-3 | 50% |
| Paris Masters | A | A | A | A | A | A | A | 2R | 2R | 2R | A | F | QF | 1R | 2R | 0 / 7 | 9-7 | 56% |
| Win–loss | 0–0 | 0–0 | 0–0 | 0–0 | 0–0 | 0–0 | 0–0 | 1–1 | 4–6 | 4–3 | 5–5 | 4–6 | 14–8 | 9–8 | 0-3 | 1 / 39 | 41–40 | 51% |
Career statistics
| | 2011 | 2012 | 2013 | 2014 | 2015 | 2016 | 2017 | 2018 | 2019 | 2020 | 2021 | 2022 | 2023 | 2024 | 2025 | Career | | |
| Titles | 0 | 0 | 0 | 0 | 0 | 0 | 0 | 1 | 2 | 1 | 0 | 3 | 5 | 0 | | 12 | | |
| Finals | 0 | 0 | 0 | 0 | 0 | 1 | 0 | 3 | 4 | 1 | 3 | 7 | 8 | 3 | | 29 | | |
| Overall win–loss | 0–1 | 0–0 | 1–1 | 7–8 | 6–11 | 5–8 | 1–2 | 17–8 | 31–26 | 14–10 | 24–23 | 40–26 | 47–19 | 29-22 | | 227–170 | | 57% |
| Year-end ranking | 382 | 146 | 104 | 69 | 83 | 112 | 126 | 41 | 42 | 41 | 40 | 10 | 1 | 43 | | $3,815,438 | | |

=== Mixed doubles ===
| Tournament | 2013 | ... | 2019 | 2020 | 2021 | 2022 | 2023 | 2024 | SR | W–L |
|---|---|---|---|---|---|---|---|---|---|---|
| Australian Open | A | | A | 1R | A | 1R | 1R | A | 0 / 3 | 0–3 |
| French Open | A | | 2R | A | A | 1R | 1R | 1R | 0 / 4 | 1–4 |
| Wimbledon | A | | A | A | 1R | 1R | A | 1R | 0 / 3 | 0–3 |
| US Open | 1R | | 1R | A | SF | 2R | F | 1R | 0 / 6 | 8–6 |
| Win–loss | 0–1 | | 1–2 | 0–1 | 3–2 | 1–4 | 4–3 | 0–3 | 0 / 16 | 9–16 |

== Grand Slam tournaments finals ==
=== Doubles: 2 (1 title, 1 runner-up) ===
| Result | Year | Tournament | Surface | Partner | Opponents | Score |
|---|---|---|---|---|---|---|
| Loss | 2022 | French Open | Clay | (Croatia) Ivan Dodig | (El Salvador) Marcelo Arévalo (Netherlands) Jean-Julien Rojer | 7–6^{(7–4)}, 6–7^{(5–7)}, 3–6 |
| Win | 2023 | French Open | Clay | (Croatia) Ivan Dodig | (Belgium) Sander Gillé (Belgium) Joran Vliegen | 6–3, 6–1 |

=== Mixed doubles: 1 (runner-up) ===
| Result | Year | Tournament | Surface | Partner | Opponents | Score |
|---|---|---|---|---|---|---|
| Loss | 2023 | US Open | Hard | (United States) Jessica Pegula | (Kazakhstan) Anna Danilina (Finland) Harri Heliövaara | 3–6, 4–6 |

== Other significant finals ==
=== ATP 1000 tournaments ===
==== Doubles: 5 (1 title, 4 runner-ups) ====
| Result | Year | Tournament | Surface | Partner | Opponents | Score |
|---|---|---|---|---|---|---|
| Loss | 2021 | Cincinnati Masters | Hard | (United States) Steve Johnson | (Spain) Marcel Granollers (Argentina) Horacio Zeballos | 6–7^{(5–7)}, 6–7^{(5–7)} |
| Loss | 2022 | Paris Masters | Hard (i) | (Croatia) Ivan Dodig | (Netherlands) Wesley Koolhof (United Kingdom) Neal Skupski | 6–7^{(5–7)}, 4–6 |
| Loss | 2023 | Miami Open | Hard | (France) Nicolas Mahut | (Mexico) Santiago González (France) Édouard Roger-Vasselin | 6–7^{(4–7)}, 5–7 |
| Win | 2023 | Monte-Carlo Masters | Clay | (Croatia) Ivan Dodig | (Monaco) Romain Arneodo (Austria) Sam Weissborn | 6–0, 4–6, [14–12] |
| Loss | 2024 | Miami Open | Hard | (Croatia) Ivan Dodig | (India) Rohan Bopanna (Australia) Matthew Ebden | 7–6^{(7–3)}, 3–6, [6–10] |

=== Summer Olympics ===
==== Doubles: 2 (1 silver medal) ====
| Result | Year | Tournament | Surface | Partner | Opponents | Score |
|---|---|---|---|---|---|---|
| 4th place | 2021 | Tokyo Summer Olympics | Hard | (United States) Tennys Sandgren | (New Zealand) Marcus Daniell (New Zealand) Michael Venus | 6–7^{(3–7)}, 2–6 |
| Silver | 2024 | Paris Summer Olympics | Clay | (United States) Rajeev Ram | (Australia) Matthew Ebden (Australia) John Peers | 7–6^{(8–6)}, 6–7^{(1–7)}, [8–10] |

== ATP Tour finals ==
=== Doubles: 36 (16 titles, 20 runner-ups) ===
| Legend Grand Slam (1–1) Olympics (0–1) ATP Finals (–) ATP 1000 (1–4) ATP 500 (5–4) ATP 250 (9–10) | Finals by surface Hard (8–15) Clay (4–3) Grass (4–2) | Finals by setting Outdoor (13–18) Indoor (3–2) |

| Result | W–L | Date | Tournament | Tier | Surface | Opponent | Score | |
|---|---|---|---|---|---|---|---|---|
| Loss | 0–1 | Jan 2016 | Maharashtra Open, India | 250 Series | Hard | (France) Benoît Paire | (Austria) Oliver Marach (France) Fabrice Martin | 3–6, 5–7 |
| Loss | 0–2 | Feb 2018 | Ecuador Open, Ecuador | 250 Series | Clay | (United States) Jackson Withrow | (Chile) Nicolás Jarry (Chile) Hans Podlipnik Castillo | 6–7^{(6–8)}, 3–6 |
| Loss | 0–3 | Sep 2018 | Chengdu Open, China | 250 Series | Hard | (India) Jeevan Nedunchezhiyan | (Croatia) Ivan Dodig (Croatia) Mate Pavić | 2–6, 4–6 |
| Win | 1–3 | Oct 2018 | Kremlin Cup, Russia | 250 Series | Hard (i) | (United States) Rajeev Ram | (Belarus) Max Mirnyi (Austria) Philipp Oswald | 7–6^{(7–4)}, 6–4 |
| Loss | 1–4 | Mar 2019 | Mexican Open, Mexico | 500 Series | Hard | (New Zealand) Artem Sitak | (Germany) Alexander Zverev (Germany) Mischa Zverev | 6–2, 6–7^{(4–7)}, [5–10] |
| Win | 2–4 | Jun 2019 | Rosmalen Championships, Netherlands | 250 Series | Grass | (United Kingdom) Dominic Inglot | (Australia) Marcus Daniell (Netherlands) Wesley Koolhof | 6–4, 4–6, [10–4] |
| Win | 3–4 | Jul 2019 | Atlanta Open, US | 250 Series | Hard | (United Kingdom) Dominic Inglot | (United States) Bob Bryan (United States) Mike Bryan | 6–4, 6–7^{(5–7)}, [11–9] |
| Loss | 3–5 | Aug 2019 | Los Cabos Open, Mexico | 250 Series | Hard | (United Kingdom) Dominic Inglot | (Monaco) Romain Arneodo (Monaco) Hugo Nys | 5–7, 7–5, [14–16] |
| Win | 4–5 | Sep 2020 | Austrian Open, Austria | 250 Series | Clay | (Croatia) Franko Škugor | (Spain) Marcel Granollers (Argentina) Horacio Zeballos | 7–6^{(7–5)}, 7–5 |
| Loss | 4–6 | Jul 2021 | Hall of Fame Open, US | 250 Series | Grass | (Canada) Vasek Pospisil | (United States) William Blumberg (United States) Jack Sock | 2–6, 6–7^{(3–7)} |
| Loss | 4–7 | Aug 2021 | Cincinnati Open, US | Masters 1000 | Hard | (United States) Steve Johnson | (Spain) Marcel Granollers (Argentina) Horacio Zeballos | 6–7^{(5–7)}, 6–7^{(5–7)} |
| Loss | 4–8 | Aug 2021 | Winston-Salem Open, US | 250 Series | Hard | (Croatia) Ivan Dodig | (El Salvador) Marcelo Arévalo (Netherlands) Matwé Middelkoop | 7–6^{(7–5)}, 5–7, [6–10] |
| Win | 5–8 | May 2022 | Lyon Open, France | 250 Series | Clay | (Croatia) Ivan Dodig | (Argentina) Máximo González (Brazil) Marcelo Melo | 6–3, 6–4 |
| Loss | 5–9 | Jun 2022 | French Open, Paris, France | Grand Slam | Clay | (Croatia) Ivan Dodig | (El Salvador) Marcelo Arévalo (Netherlands) Jean-Julien Rojer | 7–6^{(7–4)}, 6–7^{(5–7)}, 3–6 |
| Loss | 5–10 | Aug 2022 | Washington Open, US | 500 Series | Hard | (Croatia) Ivan Dodig | (Australia) Nick Kyrgios (United States) Jack Sock | 5–7, 4–6 |
| Loss | 5–11 | Oct 2022 | Firenze Open, Italy | 250 Series | Hard (i) | (Croatia) Ivan Dodig | (France) Nicolas Mahut (France) Édouard Roger-Vasselin | 6–7^{(4–7)}, 3–6 |
| Win | 6–11 | Oct 2022 | Napoli Cup, Italy | 250 Series | Hard | (Croatia) Ivan Dodig | (Australia) Matthew Ebden (Australia) John Peers | 6–3, 1–6, [10–8] |
| Win | 7–11 | Oct 2022 | Swiss Indoors, Switzerland | 500 Series | Hard (i) | (Croatia) Ivan Dodig | (France) Nicolas Mahut (France) Édouard Roger-Vasselin | 6–4, 7–6^{(7–5)} |
| Loss | 7–12 | Nov 2022 | Paris Masters, France | Masters 1000 | Hard (i) | (Croatia) Ivan Dodig | (Netherlands) Wesley Koolhof (United Kingdom) Neal Skupski | 6–7^{(5–7)}, 4–6 |
| Loss | 7–13 | Jan 2023 | Adelaide International 2, Australia | 250 Series | Hard | (Croatia) Ivan Dodig | (El Salvador) Marcelo Arévalo (Netherlands) Jean-Julien Rojer | Walkover |
| Win | 8–13 | Feb 2023 | Rotterdam Open, Netherlands | 500 Series | Hard (i) | (Croatia) Ivan Dodig | (India) Rohan Bopanna (Australia) Matthew Ebden | 7–6^{(7–5)}, 2–6, [12–10] |
| Loss | 8–14 | Mar 2023 | Miami Open, US | Masters 1000 | Hard | (France) Nicolas Mahut | (Mexico) Santiago González (France) Édouard Roger-Vasselin | 6–7^{(4–7)}, 5–7 |
| Win | 9–14 | Apr 2023 | Monte-Carlo Masters, Monaco | Masters 1000 | Clay | (Croatia) Ivan Dodig | (Monaco) Romain Arneodo (Austria) Sam Weissborn | 6–0, 4–6, [14–12] |
| Win | 10–14 | Jun 2023 | French Open, Paris, France | Grand Slam | Clay | (Croatia) Ivan Dodig | (Belgium) Sander Gillé (Belgium) Joran Vliegen | 6–3, 6–1 |
| Win | 11–14 | Jun 2023 | Queen's Club, UK | 500 Series | Grass | (Croatia) Ivan Dodig | (United States) Taylor Fritz (Czech Republic) Jiří Lehečka | 6–4, 6–7^{(5–7)}, [10–3] |
| Loss | 11–15 | Jun 2023 | Eastbourne International, UK | 250 Series | Grass | (Croatia) Ivan Dodig | (Croatia) Nikola Mektić (Croatia) Mate Pavić | 4–6, 2–6 |
| Win | 12–15 | Oct 2023 | China Open, China | 500 Series | Hard | (Croatia) Ivan Dodig | (Netherlands) Wesley Koolhof (United Kingdom) Neal Skupski | 6–7^{(12–14)}, 6–3, [10–5] |
| Loss | 12–16 | Mar 2024 | Dubai Tennis Championships, UAE | 500 Series | Hard | (Croatia) Ivan Dodig | (Netherlands) Tallon Griekspoor (Germany) Jan-Lennard Struff | 4–6, 6–4, [6–10] |
| Loss | 12–17 | Mar 2024 | Miami Open, US | Masters 1000 | Hard | (Croatia) Ivan Dodig | (India) Rohan Bopanna (Australia) Matthew Ebden | 7–6^{(7–3)}, 3–6, [6–10] |
| Loss | 12–18 | Aug 2024 | Olympic Games, Paris, France | Olympics | Clay | (United States) Rajeev Ram | (Australia) Matthew Ebden (Australia) John Peers | 7–6^{(8–6)}, 6–7^{(1–7)}, [8–10] |
| Win | 13–18 | Jun 2025 | Stuttgart Open, Germany | 250 Series | Grass | (Mexico) Santiago González | (United States) Alex Michelsen (United States) Rajeev Ram | 6–4, 6–4 |
| Win | 14–18 | Jun 2025 | Mallorca Championships, Spain | 250 Series | Grass | (Mexico) Santiago González | (India) Yuki Bhambri (United States) Robert Galloway | 6–1, 1–6, [15–13] |
| Win | 15–18 | Feb 2026 | Delray Beach Open, US | 250 Series | Hard | (Croatia) Nikola Mektić | (United States) Benjamin Kittay (United States) Ryan Seggerman | 6–7^{(3–7)}, 6–3, [11–9] |
| Loss | 15–19 | Aug 2026 | Washington Open, US | 500 Series | Hard | (Croatia) Nikola Mektić | (United Kingdom) Julian Cash (United Kingdom) Lloyd Glasspool | 3–6, 4–6 |
| Loss | 15–20 | Aug 2026 | Winston-Salem Open, US | 250 Series | Hard | (Croatia) Nikola Mektić | (Czech Republic) Petr Nouza (Austria) Neil Oberleitner | 5–7, 4–6 |
| Win | 16–20 | Oct 2026 | Japan Open, Japan | 500 Series | Hard | (Croatia) Nikola Mektić | (France) Théo Arribagé (France) Albano Olivetti | 7–6^{(7–5)}, 5–7, [10–6] |

== ATP Challenger and ITF Tour finals ==
=== Singles: 12 (8 titles, 4 runner-ups) ===
| Legend ATP Challenger Tour (2–1) ITF Futures (6–3) | Finals by surface Hard (6–4) Clay (2–0) |

| Result | W–L | Date | Tournament | Tier | Surface | Opponent | Score |
|---|---|---|---|---|---|---|---|
| Win | 1–0 | Sep 2014 | Open Medellín, Colombia | Challenger | Clay | (Brazil) João Souza | 7–5, 6–3 |
| Win | 2–0 | Apr 2015 | León Challenger, Mexico | Challenger | Hard | (Spain) Adrián Menéndez Maceiras | 6–7^{(3–7)}, 7–6^{(7–5)}, 6–4 |
| Loss | 2–1 | Aug 2015 | Nordic Naturals Challenger, United States | Challenger | Hard | (Australia) John Millman | 5–7, 6–2, 3–6 |

| Result | W–L | Date | Tournament | Tier | Surface | Opponent | Score |
|---|---|---|---|---|---|---|---|
| Loss | 0–1 | Aug 2010 | United States F20, Godfrey | Futures | Hard | (United States) Robbye Poole | 3–6, 5–7 |
| Loss | 0–2 | Jan 2012 | China F1, Shenzhen | Futures | Hard | (Czech Republic) Jiří Veselý | 3–6, 5–7 |
| Win | 1–2 | Jan 2012 | China F2, Shenzhen | Futures | Hard | (China) Zhang Ze | 3–6, 6–3, 7–6^{(7–4)} |
| Win | 2–2 | Oct 2012 | United States F27, Austin | Futures | Hard | (United Kingdom) Joshua Milton | 6–0, 6–1 |
| Loss | 2–3 | Mar 2013 | Canada F1, Gatineau | Futures | Hard (i) | (Germany) Tim Pütz | 2–6, 4–6 |
| Win | 3–3 | Mar 2013 | Canada F2, Sherbrooke | Futures | Hard (i) | (Germany) Moritz Baumann | 6–4, 3–6, 6–2 |
| Win | 4–3 | Apr 2013 | United States F10, Little Rock | Futures | Hard | (Australia) Luke Saville | 6–4, 6–2 |
| Win | 5–3 | May 2013 | United States F13, Tampa | Futures | Clay | (United States) Christian Harrison | walkover |
| Win | 6–3 | Jul 2013 | Canada F4, Saskatoon | Futures | Hard | (United States) Tennys Sandgren | 7–5, 7–6^{(8–6)} |

=== Doubles: 54 (34–20) ===
| Legend ATP Challenger Tour (22–14) ITF Futures (12–6) | Finals by surface Hard (29–15) Clay (3–3) Grass (2–1) Carpet (0–1) |

| Result | W–L | Date | Tournament | Tier | Surface | Partner | Opponents | Score |
|---|---|---|---|---|---|---|---|---|
| Win | 1–0 | Nov 2011 | Knoxville Challenger, United States | Challenger | Hard (i) | (United States) Steve Johnson | (Australia) Adam Hubble (Denmark) Frederik Nielsen | 3–6, 6–4, [13–11] |
| Win | 2–0 | Jul 2012 | Lexington Challenger, United States | Challenger | Hard | (Australia) John Peers | (United States) Tennys Sandgren (United States) Rhyne Williams | 6–1, 7–6^{(7–4)} |
| Loss | 2–1 | Oct 2012 | Natomas Men's Pro Tournament, United States | Challenger | Hard | (United States) Devin Britton | (United States) Tennys Sandgren (United States) Rhyne Williams | 6–4, 4–6, [10–12] |
| Win | 3–1 | Nov 2012 | Champaign–Urbana Challenger, United States | Challenger | Hard (i) | (United States) Devin Britton | (South Africa) Jean Andersen (South Africa) Izak van der Merwe | 6–3, 6–3 |
| Win | 4–1 | May 2013 | Tallahassee Tennis Challenger, United States | Challenger | Clay | (United States) Tennys Sandgren | (Australia) Greg Jones (Canada) Peter Polansky | 1–6, 6–2, [10–8] |
| Win | 5–1 | Sep 2013 | Telecom İzmir Cup, Turkey | Challenger | Hard | (United States) Tennys Sandgren | (United Kingdom) Brydan Klein (Australia) Dane Propoggia | 7–6^{(7–4)}, 6–4 |
| Win | 6–1 | Oct 2013 | Tiburon Challenger, United States | Challenger | Hard | (United States) Rhyne Williams | (United States) Bradley Klahn (United States) Rajeev Ram | 6–4, 6–1 |
| Loss | 6–2 | Nov 2013 | Champaign–Urbana Challenger, United States | Challenger | Hard (i) | (United States) Tennys Sandgren | (United Kingdom) Edward Corrie (United Kingdom) Daniel Smethurst | 6–7^{(5–7)}, 6–0, [7–10] |
| Win | 7–2 | Jan 2014 | Nouvelle-Calédonie Open, New Caledonia (France) | Challenger | Hard | (United States) Tennys Sandgren | (Croatia) Ante Pavić (Slovenia) Blaž Rola | 7–6^{(7–4)}, 6–3 |
| Loss | 7–3 | May 2014 | Santaizi Challenger, Chinese Taipei | Challenger | Carpet (i) | (Australia) John-Patrick Smith | (Australia) Sam Groth (Australia) Chris Guccione | 4–6, 7–5, [8–10] |
| Loss | 7–4 | May 2014 | Gimcheon Open, South Korea | Challenger | Hard | (Australia) John-Patrick Smith | (Australia) Sam Groth (Australia) Chris Guccione | 7–6^{(7–5)}, 5–7, [4–10] |
| Win | 8–4 | Aug 2014 | Vancouver Open, Canada | Challenger | Hard | (Australia) John-Patrick Smith | (New Zealand) Marcus Daniell (New Zealand) Artem Sitak | 6–3, 4–6, [10–8] |
| Win | 9–4 | Sep 2014 | Medellín Open, Colombia | Challenger | Clay | (Mexico) César Ramírez | (Venezuela) Roberto Maytín (Argentina) Andrés Molteni | 6–3, 7–5 |
| Loss | 9–5 | Nov 2014 | Internazionali Val Gardena Südtirol, Italy | Challenger | Hard (i) | (Republic of Ireland) James Cluskey | (Belarus) Sergey Betov (Belarus) Aliaksandr Bury | 4–6, 7–5, [6–10] |
| Win | 10–5 | Jan 2015 | Nouvelle-Calédonie Open, New Caledonia (France) | Challenger | Hard | (United States) Tennys Sandgren | (United States) Jarmere Jenkins (United States) Bradley Klahn | 7–6^{(7–2)}, 6–7^{(5–7)}, [10–5] |
| Win | 11–5 | Apr 2015 | León Challenger, Mexico | Challenger | Hard | (United States) Rajeev Ram | (Argentina) Guillermo Durán (Argentina) Horacio Zeballos | 6–2, 7–5 |
| Win | 12–5 | Apr 2015 | Jalisco Open, Mexico | Challenger | Hard | (United States) Rajeev Ram | (Brazil) Marcelo Demoliner (Mexico) Miguel Ángel Reyes-Varela | 7–5, 4–6, [10–6] |
| Loss | 12–6 | Sep 2015 | Cary Challenger, United States | Challenger | Hard | (United States) Nicholas Monroe | (United States) Chase Buchanan (Slovenia) Blaž Rola | 4–6, 7–6^{(7–5)}, [4–10] |
| Loss | 12–7 | Nov 2015 | Champaign–Urbana Challenger, United States | Challenger | Hard (i) | (United States) Nicholas Monroe | (Republic of Ireland) David O'Hare (United Kingdom) Joe Salisbury | 1–6, 4–6 |
| Loss | 12–8 | Apr 2016 | Open de Guadeloupe, Guadeloupe (France) | Challenger | Hard | (United States) Mitchell Krueger | (United States) James Cerretani (Netherlands) Antal van der Duim | 2–6, 7–5, [8–10] |
| Loss | 12–9 | Sep 2016 | Cary Challenger, United States | Challenger | Hard | (United States) Stefan Kozlov | (Canada) Philip Bester (Canada) Peter Polansky | 2–6, 2–6 |
| Win | 13–9 | Nov 2016 | Champaign–Urbana Challenger, United States | Challenger | Hard (i) | (United States) Tennys Sandgren | (United Kingdom) Liam Broady (United Kingdom) Luke Bambridge | 7–6^{(7–4)}, 7–6^{(7–2)} |
| Win | 14–9 | Jan 2017 | Maui Championships, United States | Challenger | Hard | (United States) Jackson Withrow | (United States) Bradley Klahn (United States) Tennys Sandgren | 6–4, 6–3 |
| Win | 15–9 | Feb 2017 | Morelos Open, Mexico | Challenger | Hard | (United States) Jackson Withrow | (United States) Kevin King (South Africa) Dean O'Brien | 6–7^{(4–7)}, 7–6^{(7–5)}, [11–9] |
| Loss | 15–10 | Nov 2017 | Shenzhen Longhua Open, China | Challenger | Hard | (United States) Jackson Withrow | (India) Sriram Balaji (India) Vishnu Vardhan | 6–7^{(3–7)}, 6–7^{(3–7)} |
| Loss | 15–11 | Nov 2017 | Hua Hin Challenger, Thailand | Challenger | Hard | (United States) Jackson Withrow | (Thailand) Sanchai Ratiwatana (Thailand) Sonchat Ratiwatana | 4–6, 7–5, [5–10] |
| Win | 16–11 | Mar 2018 | Oracle Indian Wells Challenger, United States | Challenger | Hard | (United States) Jackson Withrow | (United States) Evan King (United States) Nathan Pasha | 6–7^{(3–7)}, 6–1, [11–9] |
| Loss | 16–12 | Jun 2018 | Nottingham Open, United Kingdom | Challenger | Grass | (India) Jeevan Nedunchezhiyan | (Denmark) Frederik Nielsen (United Kingdom) Joe Salisbury | 6–7^{(5–7)}, 1–6 |
| Win | 17–12 | Jun 2018 | Ilkley Trophy, United Kingdom | Challenger | Grass | (India) Jeevan Nedunchezhiyan | (Germany) Kevin Krawietz (Germany) Andreas Mies | 6–3, 6–3 |
| Win | 18–12 | Jul 2018 | Nielsen Tennis Championships, United States | Challenger | Hard | (India) Jeevan Nedunchezhiyan | (Venezuela) Roberto Maytín (Indonesia) Christopher Rungkat | 6–7^{(4–7)}, 6–4, [10–5] |
| Win | 19–12 | Nov 2018 | Oracle Houston Challenger, United States | Challenger | Hard | (United States) Nicholas Monroe | (El Salvador) Marcelo Arévalo (United States) James Cerretani | 4–6, 7–6^{(7–3)}, [10–5] |
| Loss | 19–13 | Mar 2019 | Arizona Tennis Classic, United States | Challenger | Hard | (New Zealand) Artem Sitak | (United Kingdom) Jamie Murray (United Kingdom) Neal Skupski | 7–6^{(7–2)}, 5–7, [6–10] |
| Win | 20–13 | Mar 2022 | Monterrey Challenger, Mexico | Challenger | Hard | (Mexico) Hans Hach Verdugo | (United States) Robert Galloway (Australia) John-Patrick Smith | 6-0, 6-3 |
| Loss | 20–14 | Mar 2025 | Arizona Tennis Classic, United States | Challenger | Hard | (United States) Rajeev Ram | (Spain) Marcel Granollers (Argentina) Horacio Zeballos | 3–6, 6–7^{(2–7)} |
| Win | 21–14 | Apr 2025 | Mexico City Open, Mexico | Challenger | Clay | (Mexico) Santiago González | (United States) Ryan Seggerman (United States) Patrik Trhac | 7–6^{(11–9)}, 3–6, [10–5] |
| Win | 22–14 | Jun 2025 | Nottingham Open, United Kingdom | Challenger | Grass | (Mexico) Santiago González | (Brazil) Fernando Romboli (Australia) John-Patrick Smith | 7–6^{(7–2)}, 6–4 |

| Result | W–L | Date | Tournament | Tier | Surface | Partner | Opponents | Score |
|---|---|---|---|---|---|---|---|---|
| Win | 1–0 | Jul 2008 | United States F19, Godfrey | Futures | Hard | (United States) Conor Pollock | (Mexico) Daniel Garza (Brazil) Nicolas Santos | 6–1, 6–7^{(6–8)}, [10–6] |
| Win | 2–0 | Jun 2009 | United States F12, Loomis | Futures | Hard | (United States) Conor Pollock | (Colombia) Alejandro González (Colombia) Eduardo Struvay | 6–2, 7–6^{(7–1)} |
| Loss | 2–1 | Jul 2009 | United States F16, Pittsburgh | Futures | Clay | (United States) Rhyne Williams | (Barbados) Haydn Lewis (United States) Denis Zivkovic | 3–6, 6–3, [3–10] |
| Loss | 2–2 | Jul 2011 | United States F16, Innisbrook | Futures | Clay | (United States) Jeff Dadamo | (United States) Benjamin Rogers (Australia) John-Patrick Smith | 6–7^{(3–7)}, 3–6 |
| Win | 3–2 | Jul 2011 | United States F20, Godfrey | Futures | Hard | (United States) Jeff Dadamo | (United States) Joel Kielbowicz (United States) Chris Kwon | 6–2, 6–3 |
| Loss | 3–3 | Jan 2012 | China F2, Shenzhen | Futures | Hard | (United States) Devin Britton | (Chinese Taipei) Hsieh Cheng-peng (Chinese Taipei) Lee Hsin-han | 6–7^{(5–7)}, 0–6 |
| Win | 4–3 | Jan 2012 | Mexico F1, Monterrey | Futures | Hard | (United States) Devin Britton | (Moldova) Roman Borvanov (Guatemala) Christopher Díaz Figueroa | 6–2, 6–3 |
| Win | 5–3 | Feb 2012 | Mexico F2, Mexico City | Futures | Hard | (United States) Devin Britton | (Dominican Republic) Víctor Estrella Burgos (Venezuela) Piero Luisi | 6–3, 6–4 |
| Loss | 5–4 | May 2012 | Spain F13, Getxo | Futures | Clay | (United States) Rhyne Williams | (Spain) Iván Arenas-Gualda (Spain) Enrique López Pérez | 7–6^{(7–5)}, 6–7^{(4–7)}, [7–10] |
| Win | 6–4 | Sep 2012 | United States F26, Irvine | Futures | Hard | (United States) Devin Britton | (United States) Marcos Giron (United States) Dennis Novikov | 6–2 ret. |
| Win | 7–4 | Oct 2012 | United States F27, Austin | Futures | Hard | (United States) Devin Britton | (Australia) Carsten Ball (United States) Chase Buchanan | 6–4, 7–5 |
| Win | 8–4 | Mar 2013 | Canada F2, Sherbrooke | Futures | Hard (i) | (United States) Chase Buchanan | (Mexico) Daniel Garza (United States) Vahid Mirzadeh | 6–3, 6–2 |
| Win | 9–4 | Apr 2013 | United States F10, Little Rock | Futures | Hard | (United States) Chase Buchanan | (United Kingdom) David Rice (United Kingdom) Sean Thornley | 6–2, 6–3 |
| Loss | 9–5 | Jun 2013 | Mexico F10, Quintana Roo | Futures | Hard | (United States) Jean-Yves Aubone | (Venezuela) Luis David Martínez (Venezuela) David Souto | 4–6, 6–4, [6–10] |
| Win | 10–5 | Jul 2013 | Canada F4, Saskatoon | Futures | Hard | (United States) Tennys Sandgren | (Moldova) Roman Borvanov (Canada) Milan Pokrajac | 6–4, 3–6, [10–6] |
| Win | 11–5 | Jan 2017 | United States F2, Long Beach | Futures | Hard | (United States) Jackson Withrow | (United Kingdom) Luke Bambridge (United Kingdom) Joe Salisbury | 6–3, 3–6, [10–8] |
| Win | 12–5 | Jul 2017 | United States F21, Tulsa | Futures | Hard | (United States) Jackson Withrow | (United States) Tommy Paul (United States) Nathan Ponwith | 6–4, 6–2 |
| Loss | 12–6 | Oct 2017 | United States F33, Houston | Futures | Hard | (United States) Thai-Son Kwiatkowski | (United States) Aron Hiltzik (United States) Dennis Nevolo | 6–7^{(3–7)}, 3–6 |

Sporting positions
| Preceded by (United States) Josh Zavala | Big 12 Tennis Player of the Year; 2010 (co with (Bulgaria) Dimitar Kutrovsky); 2011 | Succeeded by (Romania) Costin Pavăl |
