= 2023 Monte-Carlo Masters =

- Date: 9–16 April
- Edition: 116th
- Category: Masters 1000
- Draw: 56S / 28D
- Prize money: €5,779,335
- Surface: Clay
- Location: Roquebrune-Cap-Martin, France (billed as Monte Carlo, Monaco)
- Venue: Monte Carlo Country Club

Champions

Singles
- Andrey Rublev

Doubles
- (Croatia) Ivan Dodig / (United States) Austin Krajicek
← 2022 ·	Monte-Carlo Masters	· 2024 →

The 2023 Monte-Carlo Masters (also known as the Rolex Monte-Carlo Masters for sponsorship reasons) was a tennis tournament for male professionals, played on outdoor clay courts. It was the 116th edition of the annual Monte Carlo Masters tournament, sponsored by Rolex for the 14th time. It was held at the Monte Carlo Country Club in Roquebrune-Cap-Martin, France (though billed as Monte Carlo, Monaco). The event was an ATP Masters 1000 tournament on the 2023 ATP Tour.

== Champions ==
=== Singles ===
- Andrey Rublev def. (Denmark) Holger Rune, 5–7, 6–2, 7–5

=== Doubles ===
- (Croatia) Ivan Dodig / (United States) Austin Krajicek def. (Monaco) Romain Arneodo / (Austria) Sam Weissborn, 6–0, 4–6, [14–12]

== Points ==
Because the Monte Carlo Masters is the non-mandatory Masters 1000 event, special rules regarding points distribution are in place. The Monte Carlo Masters counts as one of a player's 500 level tournaments, while distributing Masters 1000 points.

Event	W	F	SF	QF	Round of 16	Round of 32	Round of 64	Q	Q2	Q1
Men's Singles	1,000	600	360	180	90	45	10	25	16	0
Men's Doubles	1,000	600	360	180	90	0	—	—	—	—

=== Prize money ===
Event	W	F	SF	QF	Round of 16	Round of 32	Round of 64	Q2	Q1
Singles	€892,590	€487,420	€266,530	€145,380	€77,760	€41,700	€23,100	€11,830	€6,200
Doubles*	€282,870	€152,140	€81,140	€41,140	€21,980	€11,830	—	—	—

_{*per team}

== Singles main draw entrants ==
=== Seeds ===
Country	Player	Rank^{1}	Seed
SRB	Novak Djokovic	1	1
GRE	Stefanos Tsitsipas	3	2
	Daniil Medvedev	4	3
NOR	Casper Ruud	5	4
	Andrey Rublev	6	5
DEN	Holger Rune	8	6
ITA	Jannik Sinner	9	7
USA	Taylor Fritz	10	8
	Karen Khachanov	11	9
POL	Hubert Hurkacz	12	10
GBR	Cameron Norrie	13	11
~~USA~~	~~Frances Tiafoe~~	~~15~~	~~12~~
GER	Alexander Zverev	16	13
AUS	Alex de Minaur	19	14
CRO	Borna Ćorić	20	15
ITA	Lorenzo Musetti	21	16

^{1} Rankings are as of 3 April 2023

=== Other entrants ===
The following players received wildcards into the main draw:

- (Italy) Lorenzo Sonego
- (Austria) Dominic Thiem
- (Monaco) Valentin Vacherot
- (Switzerland) Stan Wawrinka

The following players received entry via the qualifying draw:

- (Hungary) Márton Fucsovics
- Ivan Gakhov
- (France) Ugo Humbert
- Ilya Ivashka
- (Italy) Luca Nardi
- (Australia) Alexei Popyrin
- (Germany) Jan-Lennard Struff

The following players received entry as lucky losers:

- (Serbia) Filip Krajinović
- (Serbia) Dušan Lajović
- (Finland) Emil Ruusuvuori

=== Withdrawals ===
- (Spain) Carlos Alcaraz → replaced by (Chile) Nicolás Jarry
- (Canada) Félix Auger-Aliassime → replaced by (United States) Mackenzie McDonald
- (Spain) Pablo Carreño Busta → replaced by (Serbia) Laslo Đere
- (United States) Sebastian Korda → replaced by (Serbia) Filip Krajinović
- (France) Gaël Monfils → replaced by (United Kingdom) Jack Draper
- (Spain) Rafael Nadal → replaced by (Switzerland) Marc-Andrea Hüsler
- (United States) Brandon Nakashima → replaced by (Serbia) Dušan Lajović
- (Japan) Yoshihito Nishioka → replaced by (Spain) Albert Ramos Viñolas
- (United States) Tommy Paul → replaced by (Spain) Jaume Munar
- (Canada) Denis Shapovalov → replaced by (United Kingdom) Andy Murray
- (United States) Frances Tiafoe → replaced by (Finland) Emil Ruusuvuori

== Doubles main draw entrants ==
=== Seeds ===
Country	Player	Country	Player	Rank^{1}	Seed
NED	Wesley Koolhof	GBR	Neal Skupski	2	1
USA	Rajeev Ram	GBR	Joe Salisbury	7	2
ESA	Marcelo Arévalo	NED	Jean-Julien Rojer	12	3
CRO	Nikola Mektić	CRO	Mate Pavić	13	4
CRO	Ivan Dodig	USA	Austin Krajicek	19	5
GBR	Lloyd Glasspool	FIN	Harri Heliövaara	23	6
IND	Rohan Bopanna	AUS	Matthew Ebden	35	7
ESP	Marcel Granollers	ARG	Horacio Zeballos	38	8

^{1} Rankings are as of 3 April 2023.

=== Other entrants ===
The following pairs received wildcards into the doubles main draw:

- (Monaco) Romain Arneodo / (Austria) Sam Weissborn
- (France) Nicolas Mahut / (Switzerland) Stan Wawrinka
- (Greece) Petros Tsitsipas / (Greece) Stefanos Tsitsipas

The following pair received entry into the doubles main draw as alternates:

- (Mexico) Santiago González / (France) Édouard Roger-Vasselin

=== Withdrawals ===
- (Italy) Simone Bolelli / (Italy) Fabio Fognini → replaced by (Italy) Simone Bolelli / (Italy) Lorenzo Musetti
- (Australia) John Peers / (United States) Frances Tiafoe → replaced by (Mexico) Santiago González / (France) Édouard Roger-Vasselin
