= 2023 Monte-Carlo Masters – Doubles =

Doubles
- 2023 Monte-Carlo Masters

Final
- Champions: (Croatia) Ivan Dodig (United States) Austin Krajicek
- Runners-up: (Monaco) Romain Arneodo (Austria) Sam Weissborn
- Score: 6–0, 4–6, [14–12]

Events
Singles	Doubles
← 2022 ·	Monte-Carlo Masters	· 2024 →

Ivan Dodig and Austin Krajicek defeated Romain Arneodo and Sam Weissborn in the final, 6–0, 4–6, [14–12] to win the doubles tennis title at the 2023 Monte Carlo Masters. The pair saved two championship points en route to the title and earned Dodig his sixth ATP Masters 1000 title, Krajicek his first, and the duo their fifth career title together. Arneodo was contending to become the first Monegasque champion of the tournament in the Open Era.

Rajeev Ram and Joe Salisbury were the defending champions, but lost in the second round to Arneodo and Weissborn.

== Seeds ==
The top four seeds received a bye into the second round.

1. (Netherlands) Wesley Koolhof / (United Kingdom) Neal Skupski (quarterfinals)
2. (United States) Rajeev Ram / (United Kingdom) Joe Salisbury (second round)
3. (El Salvador) Marcelo Arévalo / (Netherlands) Jean-Julien Rojer (quarterfinals)
4. (Croatia) Nikola Mektić / (Croatia) Mate Pavić (second round)
5. (Croatia) Ivan Dodig / (United States) Austin Krajicek (champions)
6. (United Kingdom) Lloyd Glasspool / (Finland) Harri Heliövaara (quarterfinals)
7. (India) Rohan Bopanna / (Australia) Matthew Ebden (second round)
8. (Spain) Marcel Granollers / (Argentina) Horacio Zeballos (first round)

== Draw ==
=== Key ===
- Q = Qualifier
- WC = Wild card
- LL = Lucky loser
- Alt = Alternate
- ITF = ITF entry
- PR = Protected ranking
- SR = Special ranking
- SE = Special exempt
- JE = Junior exempt
- JR = Junior Accelerator Programme entrant
- CO = College Accelerator Programme entrant
- NG = Next Gen Accelerator Program entrant
- w/o = Walkover
- r = Retired
- d = Defaulted

=== Finals ===
Semifinals
(France) Fabrice Martin (Germany) Andreas Mies	6^{1}	4
5	(Croatia) Ivan Dodig (United States) Austin Krajicek	7^{7}	6
(Germany) Kevin Krawietz (Germany) Tim Pütz	6^{7}	6	[7]
WC	(Monaco) Romain Arneodo (Austria) Sam Weissborn	7^{9}	4	[10]

Final
5	(Croatia) Ivan Dodig (United States) Austin Krajicek	6	4	[14]
WC	(Monaco) Romain Arneodo (Austria) Sam Weissborn	0	6	[12]

=== Top half ===
First round
K Khachanov; A Rublev	7	6
(United Kingdom) J Murray (New Zealand) M Venus	5	4
(Argentina) F Cerúndolo (United Kingdom) D Evans	3	6	[9]
(France) F Martin (Germany) A Mies	6	4	[11]
(Argentina) D Schwartzman (Italy) J Sinner	6	1	[11]
8	(Spain) M Granollers (Argentina) H Zeballos	3	6	[9]
(Italy) S Bolelli (Italy) L Musetti	6^{5}	2
(United States) T Fritz (Denmark) H Rune	7^{7}	6
Alt	(Mexico) S González (France) É Roger-Vasselin	5	7^{7}	[5]
(Colombia) JS Cabal (Colombia) R Farah	7	6^{2}	[10]
(Monaco) H Nys (Poland) J Zieliński	6^{3}	3
5	(Croatia) I Dodig (United States) A Krajicek	7^{7}	6

Second round
1	(Netherlands) W Koolhof (United Kingdom) N Skupski	6^{5}	6	[14]
K Khachanov; A Rublev	7^{7}	3	[12]
(France) F Martin (Germany) A Mies	6	6
(Argentina) D Schwartzman (Italy) J Sinner	4	4
4	(Croatia) N Mektić (Croatia) M Pavić	3	4
(United States) T Fritz (Denmark) H Rune	6	6
(Colombia) JS Cabal (Colombia) R Farah	6^{4}	4
5	(Croatia) I Dodig (United States) A Krajicek	7^{7}	6

Quarterfinals
1	(Netherlands) W Koolhof (United Kingdom) N Skupski	7	3	[7]
(France) F Martin (Germany) A Mies	5	6	[10]
(United States) T Fritz (Denmark) H Rune
5	(Croatia) I Dodig (United States) A Krajicek	w/o

Semifinals
(France) F Martin (Germany) A Mies	6^{1}	4
5	(Croatia) I Dodig (United States) A Krajicek	7^{7}	6

=== Bottom half ===
First round
7	(India) R Bopanna (Australia) M Ebden	3	6	[10]
(Brazil) R Matos (Spain) D Vega Hernández	6	3	[8]
(United Kingdom) C Norrie (United States) B Shelton	2	3
(Germany) K Krawietz (Germany) T Pütz	6	6
WC	(Greece) Pe Tsitsipas (Greece) S Tsitsipas	7^{7}	6^{4}	[10]
(Bulgaria) G Dimitrov (Poland) H Hurkacz	6^{3}	7^{7}	[5]
6	(United Kingdom) L Glasspool (Finland) H Heliövaara	6	6
WC	(France) N Mahut (Switzerland) S Wawrinka	3	4
(Argentina) M González (Argentina) A Molteni	6	7^{7}
(United States) M Cressy (Netherlands) M Middelkoop	3	6^{2}
(Brazil) M Melo (Germany) A Zverev	2	4
WC	(Monaco) R Arneodo (Austria) S Weissborn	6	6

Second round
7	(India) R Bopanna (Australia) M Ebden	4	3
(Germany) K Krawietz (Germany) T Pütz	6	6
WC	(Greece) Pe Tsitsipas (Greece) S Tsitsipas	2	7^{7}	[5]
3	(El Salvador) M Arévalo (Netherlands) J-J Rojer	6	6^{5}	[10]
6	(United Kingdom) L Glasspool (Finland) H Heliövaara	5	6	[10]
(Argentina) M González (Argentina) A Molteni	7	4	[8]
WC	(Monaco) R Arneodo (Austria) S Weissborn	6	6
2	(United States) R Ram (United Kingdom) J Salisbury	2	3

Quarterfinals
(Germany) K Krawietz (Germany) T Pütz	6	6
3	(El Salvador) M Arévalo (Netherlands) J-J Rojer	2	4
6	(United Kingdom) L Glasspool (Finland) H Heliövaara	2	6^{3}
WC	(Monaco) R Arneodo (Austria) S Weissborn	6	7^{7}

Semifinals
(Germany) K Krawietz (Germany) T Pütz	6^{7}	6	7
WC	(Monaco) R Arneodo (Austria) S Weissborn	7^{9}	4	[10]
