= 2023 Monte-Carlo Masters – Singles =

Tennis tournament event

Singles
- 2023 Monte-Carlo Masters

Final
- Champion: Andrey Rublev
- Runner-up: (Denmark) Holger Rune
- Score: 5–7, 6–2, 7–5

Details
- Draw: 56 (7 Q / 4 WC)
- Seeds: 16

Events
Singles	Doubles
- Monte-Carlo Masters

Andrey Rublev defeated Holger Rune in the final, 5–7, 6–2, 7–5 to win the men's singles tennis title at the 2023 Monte-Carlo Masters. It was his first ATP 1000 title. Rune was the first teenager to reach the Monte-Carlo Masters final since Rafael Nadal in 2006.

Stefanos Tsitsipas was the two-time defending champion, but lost in the quarterfinals to Taylor Fritz.

== Seeds ==
The top eight seeds received a bye into the second round.

1. (Serbia) Novak Djokovic (third round)
2. (Greece) Stefanos Tsitsipas (quarterfinals)
3. Daniil Medvedev (quarterfinals)
4. (Norway) Casper Ruud (third round)
5. Andrey Rublev (champion)
6. (Denmark) Holger Rune (final)
7. (Italy) Jannik Sinner (semifinals)
8. (United States) Taylor Fritz (semifinals)
9. Karen Khachanov (third round)
10. (Poland) Hubert Hurkacz (third round)
11. (United Kingdom) Cameron Norrie (first round)
12. (United States) Frances Tiafoe (withdrew)
13. (Germany) Alexander Zverev (third round)
14. (Australia) Alex de Minaur (second round)
15. (Croatia) Borna Ćorić (first round)
16. (Italy) Lorenzo Musetti (quarterfinals)

Click on the seed number of a player to go to their draw section.

== Draw ==
Key

- Q = Qualifier
- WC = Wild card
- LL = Lucky loser
- Alt = Alternate
- ITF = ITF entry
- PR = Protected ranking
- SR = Special ranking
- SE = Special exempt
- JE = Junior exempt
- JR = Junior Accelerator Programme entrant
- CO = College Accelerator Programme entrant
- NG = Next Gen Accelerator Program entrant
- w/o = Walkover
- r = Retired
- d = Defaulted

=== Finals ===
Quarterfinals
16	(Italy) Lorenzo Musetti	2	2
7	(Italy) Jannik Sinner	6	6
3	Daniil Medvedev	3	4
6	(Denmark) Holger Rune	6	6
5	Andrey Rublev	6	7^{7}
Q	(Germany) Jan-Lennard Struff	1	6^{5}
8	(United States) Taylor Fritz	6	6
2	(Greece) Stefanos Tsitsipas	2	4

Semifinals
7	(Italy) Jannik Sinner	6	5	5
6	(Denmark) Holger Rune	1	7	7
5	Andrey Rublev	5	6	6
8	(United States) Taylor Fritz	7	1	3

Final
6	(Denmark) Holger Rune	7	2	5
5	Andrey Rublev	5	6	7

=== Top half ===
==== Section 1 ====
First round
Q	I Gakhov	7^{8}	2	6
(United States) M McDonald	6^{6}	6	3
WC	(Monaco) V Vacherot	5	5
Q	(Italy) L Nardi	7	7
(Serbia) M Kecmanović	6^{1}	0
16	(Italy) L Musetti	7^{7}	6
10	(Poland) H Hurkacz	6^{5}	7^{7}	7^{7}
(Serbia) L Djere	7^{7}	6^{5}	6^{5}
(Argentina) S Báez	3	5
(United Kingdom) J Draper	6	7
(Argentina) D Schwartzman	6	6
(Belgium) D Goffin	4	2

Second round
1	(Serbia) N Djokovic	7^{7}	6
Q	I Gakhov	6^{5}	2
Q	(Italy) L Nardi	0	0
16	(Italy) L Musetti	6	6
10	(Poland) H Hurkacz	6	6^{3}	7
(United Kingdom) J Draper	3	7^{7}	5
(Argentina) D Schwartzman	0	1^{r}
7	(Italy) J Sinner	6	3

Third round
1	(Serbia) N Djokovic	6	5	4
16	(Italy) L Musetti	4	7	6
10	(Poland) H Hurkacz	6	6^{6}	1
7	(Italy) J Sinner	3	7^{8}	6

Quarterfinals
16	(Italy) L Musetti	2	2
7	(Italy) J Sinner	6	6

==== Section 2 ====
First round
Q	(France) U Humbert	6	5	5
WC	(Italy) L Sonego	3	7	7
(Spain) R Bautista Agut	5	7^{12}	6
LL	(Serbia) F Krajinović	7	6^{10}	1
(Kazakhstan) A Bublik	6	2	4
13	(Germany) A Zverev	3	6	6
11	(United Kingdom) C Norrie	3	4
(Argentina) F Cerúndolo	6	6
(United States) M Cressy	4	2
(Italy) M Berrettini	6	6
(France) R Gasquet	1	4
WC	(Austria) D Thiem	6	6

Second round
3	D Medvedev	6	6
WC	(Italy) L Sonego	3	2
(Spain) R Bautista Agut	4	4
13	(Germany) A Zverev	6	6
(Argentina) F Cerúndolo	7	6^{1}	4
(Italy) M Berrettini	5	7^{7}	6
WC	(Austria) D Thiem	2	4
6	(Denmark) H Rune	6	6

Third round
3	D Medvedev	3	7	7^{9}
13	(Germany) A Zverev	6	5	6^{7}
(Italy) M Berrettini
6	(Denmark) H Rune	w/o

Quarterfinals
3	D Medvedev	3	4
6	(Denmark) H Rune	6	6

=== Bottom half ===
==== Section 3 ====
First round
(Switzerland) M-A Hüsler	6^{3}	6	4
(Spain) J Munar	7^{7}	4	6
(United Kingdom) D Evans	6	2	3
Q	I Ivashka	2	6	6
(Spain) A Davidovich Fokina	2	2
9	K Khachanov	6	6
14	(Australia) A de Minaur	6	6
(United Kingdom) A Murray	1	3
Q	(Germany) J-L Struff	6	6
(Spain) A Ramos Viñolas	4	3
(Netherlands) B van de Zandschulp	3	7^{7}	6
Q	(Hungary) M Fucsovics	6	6^{2}	1

Second round
5	A Rublev	4	6	6
(Spain) J Munar	6	2	2
Q	I Ivashka	6^{2}	2
9	K Khachanov	7^{7}	6
14	(Australia) A de Minaur	3	2
Q	(Germany) J-L Struff	6	6
(Netherlands) B van de Zandschulp	5	6^{1}
4	(Norway) C Ruud	7	7^{7}

Third round
5	A Rublev	7^{7}	6
9	K Khachanov	6^{4}	2
Q	(Germany) J-L Struff	6	7^{8}
4	(Norway) C Ruud	1	6^{6}

Quarterfinals
5	A Rublev	6	7^{7}
Q	(Germany) J-L Struff	1	6^{5}

==== Section 4 ====
First round
WC	(Switzerland) S Wawrinka	5	6	6
(Netherlands) T Griekspoor	7	3	4
(United States) B Shelton	1	6	3
(Bulgaria) G Dimitrov	6	3	6
(Czech Republic) J Lehečka	6	7
LL	(Finland) E Ruusuvuori	1	5
15	(Croatia) B Ćorić	2	3
(Chile) N Jarry	6	6
LL	(Serbia) D Lajović	6^{1}	3
Q	(Australia) A Popyrin	7^{7}	6
(France) B Bonzi	6	7
(Spain) B Zapata Miralles	1	5

Second round
8	(United States) T Fritz	7^{12}	6
WC	(Switzerland) S Wawrinka	6^{10}	2
(Bulgaria) G Dimitrov	6^{4}	4
(Czech Republic) J Lehečka	7^{7}	6
(Chile) N Jarry	3	7	6
Q	(Australia) A Popyrin	6	5	4
(France) B Bonzi	1^{r}
2	(Greece) S Tsitsipas	4

Third round
8	(United States) T Fritz	4	6	6
(Czech Republic) J Lehečka	6	4	1
(Chile) N Jarry	3	4
2	(Greece) S Tsitsipas	6	6

Quarterfinals
8	(United States) T Fritz	6	6
2	(Greece) S Tsitsipas	2	4

== Qualifying ==
=== Seeds ===
1. (Finland) Emil Ruusuvuori (qualifying competition, lucky loser)
2. (France) Adrian Mannarino (first round)
3. (France) Grégoire Barrère (first round)
4. (France) Constant Lestienne (first round)
5. (Serbia) Dušan Lajović (qualifying competition, lucky loser)
6. (Hungary) Márton Fucsovics (qualified)
7. Ilya Ivashka (qualified)
8. (Serbia) Filip Krajinović (qualifying competition, lucky loser)
9. (France) Ugo Humbert (qualified)
10. (Peru) Juan Pablo Varillas (first round)
11. (Germany) Oscar Otte (qualifying competition)
12. (France) Luca Van Assche (qualifying competition)
13. (Australia) Alexei Popyrin (qualified)
14. (Japan) Taro Daniel (qualifying competition)

=== Qualifiers ===
1. (Germany) Jan-Lennard Struff
2. Ivan Gakhov
3. (Australia) Alexei Popyrin
4. (Italy) Luca Nardi
5. (France) Ugo Humbert
6. (Hungary) Márton Fucsovics
7. Ilya Ivashka

=== Lucky losers ===
1. (Serbia) Dušan Lajović
2. (Serbia) Filip Krajinović
3. (Finland) Emil Ruusuvuori

=== Draw ===
==== First qualifier ====
First round
1	(Finland) Emil Ruusuvuori	6	6
WC	(Monaco) Hugo Nys	3	4
(Germany) Jan-Lennard Struff	7	6
10	(Peru) Juan Pablo Varillas	5	2

Qualifying competition
1	(Finland) Emil Ruusuvuori	6^{4}	7	0
(Germany) Jan-Lennard Struff	7^{7}	5	6

==== Second qualifier ====
First round
2	(France) Adrian Mannarino	6	0	1
Alt	Ivan Gakhov	1	6	6
PR	(Hungary) Attila Balázs	2	0
12/WC	(France) Luca Van Assche	6	6

Qualifying competition
Alt	Ivan Gakhov	6	0	6
12/WC	(France) Luca Van Assche	3	6	2

==== Third qualifier ====
First round
3	(France) Grégoire Barrère	3	3
WC	(France) Benoît Paire	6	6
Alt	(Czech Republic) Vít Kopřiva	6	3	1
13	(Australia) Alexei Popyrin	3	6	6

Qualifying competition
WC	(France) Benoît Paire	6	6^{2}	4
13	(Australia) Alexei Popyrin	2	7^{7}	6

==== Fourth qualifier ====
First round
4	(France) Constant Lestienne	3	7^{8}	2
(Italy) Luca Nardi	6	6^{6}	6
(Spain) Pedro Martínez	2	4
11	(Germany) Oscar Otte	6	6

Qualifying competition
(Italy) Luca Nardi	6^{5}	6	7^{7}
11	(Germany) Oscar Otte	7^{7}	3	6^{4}

==== Fifth qualifier ====
First round
5	(Serbia) Dušan Lajović	6	6
Alt	(Portugal) João Sousa	2	4
WC	(Monaco) Lucas Catarina	6^{8}	4
9	(France) Ugo Humbert	7^{10}	6

Qualifying competition
5	(Serbia) Dušan Lajović	6	3	4
9	(France) Ugo Humbert	2	6	6

==== Sixth qualifier ====
First round
6	(Hungary) Márton Fucsovics	4	6	6
(Italy) Giulio Zeppieri	6	4	2
Roman Safiullin	7^{7}	3	2
8	(Serbia) Filip Krajinović	6^{4}	6	6

Qualifying competition
6	(Hungary) Márton Fucsovics	6	7
8	(Serbia) Filip Krajinović	3	5

==== Seventh qualifier ====
First round
7/Alt	Ilya Ivashka	6	6
(France) Hugo Gaston	4	4
(Finland) Otto Virtanen	1	4
14	(Japan) Taro Daniel	6	6

Qualifying competition
7/Alt	Ilya Ivashka	6	6^{8}	6
14	(Japan) Taro Daniel	4	7^{10}	2
