= 2023 Miami Open – Men's singles =

Men's singles
- 2023 Miami Open

Final
- Champion: Daniil Medvedev
- Runner-up: (Italy) Jannik Sinner
- Score: 7–5, 6–3

Details
- Draw: 96 (12 Q / 5 WC )
- Seeds: 32

Events
| Singles | men | women |
| Doubles | men | women |
- Miami Open

Daniil Medvedev defeated Jannik Sinner in the final, 7–5, 6–3 to win the men's singles tennis title at the 2023 Miami Open. It was his fifth Masters 1000 title, fourth title of the season, and 19th career title overall. He became only the ninth man to win five Masters titles.

Carlos Alcaraz was the defending champion, but lost in the semifinals to Sinner in a rematch of their Indian Wells semifinal two weeks prior.

Novak Djokovic regained the world No. 1 ranking from Alcaraz at the end of the tournament, despite having been unable to enter the United States due to being unvaccinated for COVID-19.

== Seeds ==
All seeds received a bye into the second round.

1. (Spain) Carlos Alcaraz (semifinals)
2. (Greece) Stefanos Tsitsipas (fourth round)
3. (Norway) Casper Ruud (third round)
4. Daniil Medvedev (champion)
5. (Canada) Félix Auger-Aliassime (third round)
6. Andrey Rublev (fourth round)
7. (Denmark) Holger Rune (fourth round)
8. (Poland) Hubert Hurkacz (third round)
9. (United States) Taylor Fritz (quarterfinals)
10. (Italy) Jannik Sinner (final)
11. (United Kingdom) Cameron Norrie (second round)
12. (United States) Frances Tiafoe (third round)
13. (Germany) Alexander Zverev (second round)
14. Karen Khachanov (semifinals)
15. (Australia) Alex de Minaur (second round)
16. (United States) Tommy Paul (fourth round)
17. (Croatia) Borna Ćorić (second round)
18. (Italy) Lorenzo Musetti (second round)
19. (Italy) Matteo Berrettini (second round)
20. (Spain) Alejandro Davidovich Fokina (third round)
21. (Bulgaria) Grigor Dimitrov (third round)
22. (Spain) Roberto Bautista Agut (second round)
23. (United Kingdom) Daniel Evans (second round)
24. (Canada) Denis Shapovalov (third round)
25. (Argentina) Francisco Cerúndolo (quarterfinals)
26. (Netherlands) Botic van de Zandschulp (fourth round)
27. (Argentina) Sebastián Báez (second round)
28. (Japan) Yoshihito Nishioka (second round)
29. (Serbia) Miomir Kecmanović (third round)
30. (United States) Maxime Cressy (second round)
31. (Argentina) Diego Schwartzman (third round)
32. (United States) Ben Shelton (second round)

Click on the seed number of a player to go to their draw section.

== Draw ==
Key

- Q = Qualifier
- WC = Wild card
- LL = Lucky loser
- Alt = Alternate
- ITF = ITF entry
- PR = Protected ranking
- SR = Special ranking
- SE = Special exempt
- JE = Junior exempt
- JR = Junior Accelerator Programme entrant
- CO = College Accelerator Programme entrant
- NG = Next Gen Accelerator Program entrant
- w/o = Walkover
- r = Retired
- d = Defaulted

=== Finals ===
Quarterfinals
1 | (Spain) Carlos Alcaraz | 6 | 6
9 | (United States) Taylor Fritz | 4 | 2
(Finland) Emil Ruusuvuori | 3 | 1
10 | (Italy) Jannik Sinner | 6 | 6
Q | (United States) Christopher Eubanks | 3 | 5
4 | Daniil Medvedev | 6 | 7
25 | (Argentina) Francisco Cerúndolo | 3 | 2
14 | Karen Khachanov | 6 | 6

Semifinals
1 | (Spain) Carlos Alcaraz | 7^{7} | 4 | 2
10 | (Italy) Jannik Sinner | 6^{4} | 6 | 6
4 | Daniil Medvedev | 7^{7} | 3 | 6
14 | Karen Khachanov | 6^{5} | 6 | 3

Final
10 | (Italy) Jannik Sinner | 5 | 3
4 | Daniil Medvedev | 7 | 6

=== Top half ===
==== Section 1 ====
First round
Q | (Brazil) F Meligeni Alves | 3 | 6 | 4
(Argentina) F Bagnis | 6 | 1 | 6
(United Kingdom) A Murray | 4 | 5
(Serbia) D Lajović | 6 | 7
(Germany) O Otte | 6^{3} | 3
(United States) B Nakashima | 7^{7} | 6
(Switzerland) M-A Hüsler | 6^{4} | 7^{7} | 6
(Spain) A Ramos Viñolas | 7^{7} | 6^{2} | 3

Second round
1 | (Spain) C Alcaraz | 6 | 6
(Argentina) F Bagnis | 0 | 2
(Serbia) D Lajović | 6 | 7^{7}
30 | (United States) M Cressy | 4 | 6^{2}
20 | (Spain) A Davidovich Fokina | 6 | 7^{7}
(United States) B Nakashima | 4 | 6^{5}
(Switzerland) M-A Hüsler | 7 | 3 | 4
16 | (United States) T Paul | 5 | 6 | 6

Third round
1 | (Spain) C Alcaraz | 6 | 7^{7}
(Serbia) D Lajović | 0 | 6^{5}
20 | (Spain) A Davidovich Fokina | 3 | 5
16 | (United States) T Paul | 6 | 7

Fourth round
1 | (Spain) C Alcaraz | 6 | 6
16 | (United States) T Paul | 4 | 4

==== Section 2 ====
First round
WC | (United States) E Nava | 7^{7} | 7^{7}
(United States) J Isner | 6^{5} | 6^{4}
PR | (Argentina) G Pella | 1 | 6 | 6
(Peru) JP Varillas | 6 | 3 | 2
(China) Y Wu | 7 | 7
PR | (United Kingdom) K Edmund | 5 | 5
(Argentina) P Cachin | 4 | 6^{2}
(Hungary) M Fucsovics | 6 | 7^{7}

Second round
9 | (United States) T Fritz | 6 | 6
WC | (United States) E Nava | 4 | 1
PR | (Argentina) G Pella | 3 | 6 | 3
24 | (Canada) D Shapovalov | 6 | 3 | 6
31 | (Argentina) D Schwartzman | 7^{7} | 6
(China) Y Wu | 6^{1} | 1
(Hungary) M Fucsovics | 3 | 5
7 | (Denmark) H Rune | 6 | 7

Third round
9 | (United States) T Fritz | 6 | 6
24 | (Canada) D Shapovalov | 4 | 4
31 | (Argentina) D Schwartzman | 4 | 2
7 | (Denmark) H Rune | 6 | 6

Fourth round
9 | (United States) T Fritz | 6 | 6
7 | (Denmark) H Rune | 3 | 4

==== Section 3 ====
First round
I Ivashka | 6 | 6
Q | (Germany) D Altmaier | 2 | 1
(Australia) A Popyrin | 7^{7} | 4
(Sweden) M Ymer | 6^{5} | 4^{r}
(Finland) E Ruusuvuori | 6 | 6
Q | (Portugal) N Borges | 1 | 4
WC | (Japan) T Daniel | 4
(France) A Rinderknech | 1^{r}

Second round
3 | (Norway) C Ruud | 6 | 6
I Ivashka | 2 | 3
(Australia) A Popyrin | 6 | 6^{4} | 2
26 | (Netherlands) B van de Zandschulp | 4 | 7^{7} | 6
22 | (Spain) R Bautista Agut | 4 | 6^{5}
(Finland) E Ruusuvuori | 6 | 7^{7}
WC | (Japan) T Daniel | 6 | 6
13 | (Germany) A Zverev | 0 | 4

Third round
3 | (Norway) C Ruud | 6 | 4 | 4
26 | (Netherlands) B van de Zandschulp | 3 | 6 | 6
(Finland) E Ruusuvuori | 6 | 7^{7}
WC | (Japan) T Daniel | 3 | 6^{3}

Fourth round
26 | (Netherlands) B van de Zandschulp | 6 | 4 | 5
(Finland) E Ruusuvuori | 4 | 6 | 7

==== Section 4 ====
First round
Q | (Australia) A Vukic | 2 | 6^{3}
(Serbia) L Djere | 6 | 7^{7}
(Italy) F Fognini | 4 | 7 | 4
Q | (Germany) J-L Struff | 6 | 5 | 6
(France) U Humbert | 3
PR | (France) G Monfils | 3^{r}
(Kazakhstan) A Bublik | 5 | 3
(United States) JJ Wolf | 7 | 6

Second round
10 | (Italy) J Sinner | 6 | 6
(Serbia) L Djere | 4 | 2
Q | (Germany) J-L Struff | 6 | 6^{5} | 4
21 | (Bulgaria) G Dimitrov | 4 | 7^{7} | 6
29 | (Serbia) M Kecmanović | 6 | 6^{5} | 7^{7}
(France) U Humbert | 4 | 7^{7} | 6^{3}
(United States) JJ Wolf | 6^{3} | 4
6 | A Rublev | 7^{7} | 6

Third round
10 | (Italy) J Sinner | 6 | 6
21 | (Bulgaria) G Dimitrov | 3 | 4
29 | (Serbia) M Kecmanović | 1 | 2
6 | A Rublev | 6 | 6

Fourth round
10 | (Italy) J Sinner | 6 | 6
6 | A Rublev | 2 | 4

=== Bottom half ===
==== Section 5 ====
First round
LL | (Australia) T Kokkinakis | 4 | 6 | 7^{9}
WC | (Belgium) Z Bergs | 6 | 3 | 6^{7}
(France) A Mannarino | 1 | 6 | 6
WC | (China) J Shang | 6 | 4 | 2
Q | (United States) C Eubanks | 7^{7} | 6
(United States) D Kudla | 6^{2} | 2
(France) G Barrère | 6 | 3 | 6
Q | R Safiullin | 4 | 6 | 3

Second round
8 | (Poland) H Hurkacz | 6^{10} | 7^{9} | 7^{8}
LL | (Australia) T Kokkinakis | 7^{12} | 6^{7} | 6^{6}
(France) A Mannarino | 6 | 3 | 6
32 | (United States) B Shelton | 4 | 6 | 1
17 | (Croatia) B Ćorić | 6 | 4 | 2
Q | (United States) C Eubanks | 3 | 6 | 6
(France) G Barrère | 6 | 6
11 | (United Kingdom) C Norrie | 3 | 2

Third round
8 | (Poland) H Hurkacz | 6^{5} | 6^{0}
(France) A Mannarino | 7^{7} | 7^{7}
Q | (United States) C Eubanks | 6 | 7^{9}
(France) G Barrère | 3 | 6^{7}

Fourth round
(France) A Mannarino | 6^{2} | 6^{5}
Q | (United States) C Eubanks | 7^{7} | 7^{7}

==== Section 6 ====
First round
(Spain) P Martínez | 2 | 6^{4}
(France) Q Halys | 6 | 7^{7}
(Colombia) DE Galán | 4 | 2
(United States) M McDonald | 6 | 6
(Slovakia) A Molčan | 6 | 4 | 6
Q | (Australia) J Thompson | 2 | 6 | 3
(Spain) R Carballés Baena | 6 | 3
(Spain) B Zapata Miralles | 0 | 0^{r}

Second round
15 | (Australia) A de Minaur | 7^{7} | 6^{3} | 6^{8}
(France) Q Halys | 6^{5} | 7^{7} | 7^{10}
(United States) M McDonald | 7^{10} | 7^{7}
19 | (Italy) M Berrettini | 6^{8} | 6^{5}
28 | (Japan) Y Nishioka | 6^{5} | 6 | 2
(Slovakia) A Molčan | 7^{7} | 1 | 6
(Spain) R Carballés Baena | 1 | 2
4 | D Medvedev | 6 | 6

Third round
(France) Q Halys | 7^{7} | 6
(United States) M McDonald | 6^{2} | 3
(Slovakia) A Molčan
4 | D Medvedev | w/o

Fourth round
(France) Q Halys | 4 | 2
4 | D Medvedev | 6 | 6

==== Section 7 ====
First round
(Brazil) T Monteiro | 6 | 7^{8}
(Australia) J Kubler | 4 | 6^{6}
LL | (United States) A Kovacevic | 7^{7} | 2 | 6
(Spain) J Munar | 6^{4} | 6 | 1
(Italy) L Sonego | 7^{9} | 6
WC | (Austria) D Thiem | 6^{7} | 2
Q | (Japan) Y Watanuki | 6 | 7
Q | (France) B Paire | 4 | 5

Second round
5 | (Canada) F Auger-Aliassime | 7^{7} | 7^{10}
(Brazil) T Monteiro | 6^{5} | 6^{8}
LL | (United States) A Kovacevic | 4 | 4
25 | (Argentina) F Cerúndolo | 6 | 6
23 | (United Kingdom) D Evans | 6 | 3 | 2
(Italy) L Sonego | 4 | 6 | 6
Q | (Japan) Y Watanuki | 7^{7} | 6^{3} | 4
12 | (United States) F Tiafoe | 6^{5} | 7^{7} | 6

Third round
5 | (Canada) F Auger-Aliassime | 2 | 5
25 | (Argentina) F Cerúndolo | 6 | 7
(Italy) L Sonego | 6 | 6
12 | (United States) F Tiafoe | 3 | 4

Fourth round
25 | (Argentina) F Cerúndolo | 3 | 6 | 6
(Italy) L Sonego | 6 | 3 | 2

==== Section 8 ====
First round
Q | P Kotov | 2 | 2
(Argentina) TM Etcheverry | 6 | 6
(Argentina) F Coria | 3 | 4
(Czech Republic) J Lehečka | 6 | 6
(United States) M Giron | 4 | 6 | 4
Q | (Chile) C Garín | 6 | 2 | 6
(France) R Gasquet | 6 | 3 | 6
LL | (Australia) C O'Connell | 4 | 6 | 1

Second round
14 | K Khachanov | 6 | 3 | 6
(Argentina) TM Etcheverry | 1 | 6 | 3
(Czech Republic) J Lehečka | 6 | 6
18 | (Italy) L Musetti | 4 | 4
27 | (Argentina) S Báez | 6^{2} | 3
Q | (Chile) C Garín | 7^{7} | 6
(France) R Gasquet
2 | (Greece) S Tsitsipas | w/o

Third round
14 | K Khachanov | 6 | 6
(Czech Republic) J Lehečka | 2 | 4
Q | (Chile) C Garín | 3 | 6 | 4
2 | (Greece) S Tsitsipas | 6 | 4 | 6

Fourth round
14 | K Khachanov | 7^{7} | 6
2 | (Greece) S Tsitsipas | 6^{4} | 4

== Seeded players ==
The following are the seeded players. Seedings are based on ATP rankings as of March 20, 2023. Rankings and points before are as of March 20, 2023.

| Seed | Rank | Player | Points before | Points defending | Points earned | Points after | Status |
|---|---|---|---|---|---|---|---|
| 1 | 1 | (Spain) Carlos Alcaraz | 7,420 | 1,000 | 360 | 6,780 | Semifinals lost to (Italy) Jannik Sinner [10] |
| 2 | 3 | (Greece) Stefanos Tsitsipas | 5,770 | 90 | 90 | 5,770 | Fourth round lost to Karen Khachanov [14] |
| 3 | 4 | (Norway) Casper Ruud | 5,560 | 600 | 45 | 5,005 | Third round lost to (Netherlands) Botic van de Zandschulp [26] |
| 4 | 5 | Daniil Medvedev | 4,330 | 180 | 1,000 | 5,150 | Champion, defeated (Italy) Jannik Sinner [10] |
| 5 | 6 | (Canada) Félix Auger-Aliassime | 3,415 | 10 | 45 | 3,450 | Third round lost to (Argentina) Francisco Cerúndolo [25] |
| 6 | 7 | Andrey Rublev | 3,390 | 10 | 90 | 3,470 | Fourth round lost to (Italy) Jannik Sinner [10] |
| 7 | 8 | (Denmark) Holger Rune | 3,325 | (45)^{†} | 90 | 3,370 | Fourth round lost to (United States) Taylor Fritz [9] |
| 8 | 9 | (Poland) Hubert Hurkacz | 3,065 | 360 | 45 | 2,750 | Third round lost to (France) Adrian Mannarino |
| 9 | 10 | (United States) Taylor Fritz | 2,975 | 90 | 180 | 3,065 | Quarterfinals lost to (Spain) Carlos Alcaraz [1] |
| 10 | 11 | (Italy) Jannik Sinner | 2,925 | 180 | 600 | 3,345 | Runner-up, lost to (Russia) Daniil Medvedev [4] |
| 11 | 12 | (United Kingdom) Cameron Norrie | 2,815 | 90 | 10 | 2,735 | Second round lost to (France) Grégoire Barrère |
| 12 | 14 | (United States) Frances Tiafoe | 2,710 | 90 | 45 | 2,665 | Third round lost to (Italy) Lorenzo Sonego |
| 13 | 15 | (Germany) Alexander Zverev | 2,580 | 180 | 10 | 2,410 | Second round lost to (Japan) Taro Daniel [WC] |
| 14 | 16 | Karen Khachanov | 2,505 | 10 | 360 | 2,855 | Semifinals lost to Daniil Medvedev [4] |
| 15 | 18 | (Australia) Alex de Minaur | 2,085 | 45 | 10 | 2,050 | Second round lost to (France) Quentin Halys |
| 16 | 19 | (United States) Tommy Paul | 2,045 | 45 | 90 | 2,090 | Fourth round lost to (Spain) Carlos Alcaraz [1] |
| 17 | 20 | (Croatia) Borna Ćorić | 1,905 | 25 | 10 | 1,890 | Second round lost to (United States) Christopher Eubanks [Q] |
| 18 | 21 | (Italy) Lorenzo Musetti | 1,840 | 10 | 10 | 1,840 | Second round lost to (Czech Republic) Jiří Lehečka |
| 19 | 23 | (Italy) Matteo Berrettini | 1,732 | 0 | 10 | 1,742 | Second round lost to (United States) Mackenzie McDonald |
| 20 | 25 | (Spain) Alejandro Davidovich Fokina | 1,545 | 10 | 45 | 1,580 | Third round lost to (United States) Tommy Paul [16] |
| 21 | 27 | (Bulgaria) Grigor Dimitrov | 1,450 | 10 | 45 | 1,485 | Third round lost to (Italy) Jannik Sinner [10] |
| 22 | 28 | (Spain) Roberto Bautista Agut | 1,430 | 45 | 10 | 1,395 | Second round lost to (Finland) Emil Ruusuvuori |
| 23 | 29 | (United Kingdom) Dan Evans | 1,345 | 10 | 10 | 1,345 | Second round lost to (Italy) Lorenzo Sonego |
| 24 | 30 | (Canada) Denis Shapovalov | 1,345 | 10 | 45 | 1,380 | Third round lost to (United States) Taylor Fritz [9] |
| 25 | 31 | (Argentina) Francisco Cerúndolo | 1,320 | 360 | 180 | 1,140 | Quarterfinals lost to Karen Khachanov [14] |
| 26 | 32 | (Netherlands) Botic van de Zandschulp | 1,170 | 10 | 90 | 1,250 | Fourth round lost to (Finland) Emil Ruusuvuori |
| 27 | 33 | (Argentina) Sebastián Báez | 1,170 | 10 | 10 | 1,170 | Second round lost to (Chile) Cristian Garín [Q] |
| 28 | 34 | (Japan) Yoshihito Nishioka | 1,144 | 61 | 10 | 1,093 | Second round lost to (Slovakia) Alex Molčan |
| 29 | 35 | (Serbia) Miomir Kecmanović | 1,120 | 180 | 45 | 985 | Third round lost to Andrey Rublev [6] |
| 30 | 37 | (United States) Maxime Cressy | 1,016 | 10 | 10 | 1,016 | Second round lost to (Serbia) Dušan Lajović |
| 31 | 38 | (Argentina) Diego Schwartzman | 990 | 10 | 45 | 1,025 | Third round lost to (Denmark) Holger Rune [7] |
| 32 | 39 | (United States) Ben Shelton | 989 | 0 | 10 | 999 | Second round lost to (France) Adrian Mannarino |

† The player did not qualify for the main draw in 2022. Points from his 19th best result will be deducted instead.

=== Withdrawn players ===
The following players would have been seeded, but withdrew before the tournament began.

| Rank | Player | Points before | Points dropped | Points after | Withdrawal reason |
|---|---|---|---|---|---|
| 2 | (Serbia) Novak Djokovic | 7,160 | 0 | 7,160 | Vaccination requirements not met |
| 13 | (Spain) Rafael Nadal | 2,715 | 0 | 2,715 | Left leg injury |
| 17 | (Spain) Pablo Carreño Busta | 2,230 | 45 | 2,185 | Elbow injury |
| 22 | (Croatia) Marin Čilić | 1,735 | 45 | 1,690 | Knee injury |
| 24 | (Australia) Nick Kyrgios | 1,645 | 90 | 1,555 | Left knee injury |
| 26 | (United States) Sebastian Korda | 1,525 | 45 | 1,480 | Right wrist injury |
| 36 | (Netherlands) Tallon Griekspoor | 1,069 | 10 | 1,059 | Unspecified |

== Other entry information ==
=== Wildcards ===
- (Belgium) Zizou Bergs
- (Japan) Taro Daniel
- (United States) Emilio Nava
- (China) Shang Juncheng
- (Austria) Dominic Thiem

=== Protected ranking ===
- (United Kingdom) Kyle Edmund
- (France) Gaël Monfils
- (Argentina) Guido Pella

=== Withdrawals ===
Before the tournament

- (France) Benjamin Bonzi → replaced by (France) Ugo Humbert
- (United States) Jenson Brooksby → replaced by (Brazil) Thiago Monteiro
- (Spain) Pablo Carreño Busta → replaced by (Australia) Alexei Popyrin
- (Croatia) Marin Čilić → replaced by Ilya Ivashka
- (Serbia) Novak Djokovic → replaced by (Colombia) Daniel Elahi Galán
- (United Kingdom) Jack Draper → replaced by (Australia) Christopher O'Connell
- (Belgium) David Goffin → replaced by (Hungary) Márton Fucsovics
- (Netherlands) Tallon Griekspoor → replaced by (Argentina) Facundo Bagnis
- (United States) Sebastian Korda → replaced by (United States) Denis Kudla
- (Serbia) Filip Krajinović → replaced by (Australia) Thanasi Kokkinakis
- (South Korea) Kwon Soon-woo → replaced by (Italy) Fabio Fognini
- (Australia) Nick Kyrgios → replaced by (Germany) Oscar Otte
- (France) Constant Lestienne → replaced by (United States) Aleksandar Kovacevic
- (France) Corentin Moutet → replaced by (Serbia) Dušan Lajović
- (Spain) Rafael Nadal → replaced by (Peru) Juan Pablo Varillas

== Qualifying ==
=== Seeds ===
1. (Portugal) Nuno Borges (qualified)
2. (Australia) Christopher O'Connell (qualifying competition, lucky loser)
3. (Australia) Jordan Thompson (qualified)
4. (Ecuador) Emilio Gómez (first round)
5. (China) Zhang Zhizhen (qualifying competition)
6. (Australia) Thanasi Kokkinakis (qualifying competition, lucky loser)
7. (Chile) Cristian Garín (qualified)
8. (Germany) Daniel Altmaier (qualified)
9. (United States) Aleksandar Kovacevic (qualifying competition, lucky loser)
10. (United States) Christopher Eubanks (qualified)
11. (Moldova) Radu Albot (qualifying competition)
12. Roman Safiullin (qualified)
13. (Australia) James Duckworth (first round)
14. (Italy) Matteo Arnaldi (first round)
15. Pavel Kotov (qualified)
16. (Georgia (country)) Nikoloz Basilashvili (first round)
17. (Netherlands) Gijs Brouwer (first round)
18. (Croatia) Borna Gojo (qualifying competition)
19. (Japan) Yosuke Watanuki (qualified)
20. (Argentina) Camilo Ugo Carabelli (first round, retired)
21. (Czech Republic) Tomáš Macháč (qualifying competition)
22. (Australia) Rinky Hijikata (first round)
23. Alexander Shevchenko (first round)
24. (Germany) Jan-Lennard Struff (qualified)

=== Qualifiers ===
1. (Portugal) Nuno Borges
2. (Japan) Yosuke Watanuki
3. (Australia) Jordan Thompson
4. (Brazil) Felipe Meligeni Alves
5. (Germany) Jan-Lennard Struff
6. (France) Benoît Paire
7. (Chile) Cristian Garín
8. (Germany) Daniel Altmaier
9. (Australia) Aleksandar Vukic
10. (United States) Christopher Eubanks
11. Pavel Kotov
12. Roman Safiullin

=== Lucky losers ===
1. (Australia) Christopher O'Connell
2. (Australia) Thanasi Kokkinakis
3. (United States) Aleksandar Kovacevic

=== Qualifying draw ===
==== First qualifier ====
First round
1 | (Portugal) Nuno Borges | 6 | 6
(United States) Steve Johnson | 4 | 4
(United States) Brandon Holt | 7^{7} | 6^{5} | 6^{3}
18 | (Croatia) Borna Gojo | 6^{4} | 7^{7} | 7^{7}

Qualifying competition
1 | (Portugal) Nuno Borges | 6 | 6^{6} | 7^{8}
18 | (Croatia) Borna Gojo | 4 | 7^{8} | 6^{6}

==== Second qualifier ====
First round
2 | (Australia) Christopher O'Connell | 7^{7} | 6
(Germany) Yannick Hanfmann | 6^{2} | 4
WC | (Belgium) Alexander Blockx | 6 | 3 | 0
19 | (Japan) Yosuke Watanuki | 3 | 6 | 6

Qualifying competition
2 | (Australia) Christopher O'Connell | 4 | 4
19 | (Japan) Yosuke Watanuki | 6 | 6

==== Third qualifier ====
First round
3 | (Australia) Jordan Thompson | 6 | 6
(Argentina) Renzo Olivo | 2 | 1
PR | (United States) Bradley Klahn | 4 | 4
21 | (Czech Republic) Tomáš Macháč | 6 | 6

Qualifying competition
3 | (Australia) Jordan Thompson | 6 | 3 | 6
21 | (Czech Republic) Tomáš Macháč | 4 | 6 | 3

==== Fourth qualifier ====
First round
4 | (Ecuador) Emilio Gómez | 2 | 2
(Kazakhstan) Timofey Skatov | 6 | 6
(Brazil) Felipe Meligeni Alves | 6 | 1 | 6
16 | (Georgia (country)) Nikoloz Basilashvili | 4 | 6 | 1

Qualifying competition
(Kazakhstan) Timofey Skatov | 4 | 6^{5}
(Brazil) Felipe Meligeni Alves | 6 | 7^{7}

==== Fifth qualifier ====
First round
5 | (China) Zhang Zhizhen | 6 | 6
(Italy) Mattia Bellucci | 1 | 3
WC | (United States) Learner Tien | 6 | 3 | 4
24 | (Germany) Jan-Lennard Struff | 3 | 6 | 6

Qualifying competition
5 | (China) Zhang Zhizhen | 4 | 2
24 | (Germany) Jan-Lennard Struff | 6 | 6

==== Sixth qualifier ====
First round
6 | (Australia) Thanasi Kokkinakis | 6 | 6
(Argentina) Andrea Collarini | 3 | 3
WC | (France) Benoît Paire | 6 | 6
17 | (Netherlands) Gijs Brouwer | 2 | 4

Qualifying competition
6 | (Australia) Thanasi Kokkinakis | 4 | 6 | 5
WC | (France) Benoît Paire | 6 | 4 | 7

==== Seventh qualifier ====
First round
7 | (Chile) Cristian Garín | 6 | 6
(Japan) Kaichi Uchida | 4 | 4
(Chile) Alejandro Tabilo | 4 | 6 | 6
23 | Alexander Shevchenko | 6 | 1 | 4

Qualifying competition
7 | (Chile) Cristian Garín | 7^{7} | 6
(Chile) Alejandro Tabilo | 6^{5} | 1

==== Eighth qualifier ====
First round
8 | (Germany) Daniel Altmaier | 7 | 7^{7}
WC | (United States) Martin Damm | 5 | 6^{3}
(France) Geoffrey Blancaneaux | 3 | 6 | 6
22 | (Australia) Rinky Hijikata | 6 | 3 | 4

Qualifying competition
8 | (Germany) Daniel Altmaier | 6 | 6
(France) Geoffrey Blancaneaux | 2 | 2

==== Ninth qualifier ====
First round
9 | (United States) Aleksandar Kovacevic | 6^{1} | 7^{7} | 7^{7}
(Germany) Maximilian Marterer | 7^{7} | 6^{4} | 6^{0}
(Australia) Aleksandar Vukic | 6 | 7
13 | (Australia) James Duckworth | 1 | 5

Qualifying competition
9 | (United States) Aleksandar Kovacevic | 3 | 6^{4}
(Australia) Aleksandar Vukic | 6 | 7^{7}

==== Tenth qualifier ====
First round
10 | (United States) Christopher Eubanks | 6 | 6
WC | (Jordan) Abedallah Shelbayh | 3 | 3
(Slovakia) Lukáš Klein | 6 | 4 | 6
14 | (Italy) Matteo Arnaldi | 4 | 6 | 4

Qualifying competition
10 | (United States) Christopher Eubanks | 6^{2} | 6 | 7^{7}
(Slovakia) Lukáš Klein | 7^{7} | 3 | 6^{4}

==== Eleventh qualifier ====
First round
11 | (Moldova) Radu Albot | 6^{5} | 6 | 7^{7}
(Sweden) Elias Ymer | 7^{7} | 4 | 6^{4}
(Chinese Taipei) Wu Tung-lin | 2 | 6^{5}
15 | Pavel Kotov | 6 | 7^{7}

Qualifying competition
11 | (Moldova) Radu Albot | 2 | 3
15 | Pavel Kotov | 6 | 6

==== Twelfth qualifier ====
First round
12 | Roman Safiullin | 4 | 6 | 6
(United States) Nicolas Moreno de Alboran | 6 | 3 | 2
(Austria) Filip Misolic | 6 | 5
20 | (Argentina) Camilo Ugo Carabelli | 3 | 3^{r}

Qualifying competition
12 | Roman Safiullin | 6 | 6
(Austria) Filip Misolic | 3 | 3
