= 2023 Miami Open – Men's doubles =

Men's doubles
- 2023 Miami Open

Final
- Champions: (Mexico) Santiago González (France) Édouard Roger-Vasselin
- Runners-up: (United States) Austin Krajicek (France) Nicolas Mahut
- Score: 7–6^{(7–4)}, 7–5

Events
Singles	men	women
Doubles	men	women
- Miami Open

Santiago González and Édouard Roger-Vasselin defeated Austin Krajicek and Nicolas Mahut in the final, 7–6^{(7–4)}, 7–5 to win the men's doubles tennis title at the 2023 Miami Open.

Hubert Hurkacz and John Isner were the reigning champions, but they withdrew from their first-round match after Isner sustained a foot injury.

Wesley Koolhof, Neal Skupski and Rajeev Ram were in contention for the ATP No. 1 doubles ranking. Koolhof and Skupski retained the top ranking after Ram lost in the second round.

== Seeds ==
1. (Netherlands) Wesley Koolhof / (United Kingdom) Neal Skupski (quarterfinals)
2. (United States) Rajeev Ram / (United Kingdom) Joe Salisbury (second round)
3. (Croatia) Nikola Mektić / (Croatia) Mate Pavić (first round)
4. (El Salvador) Marcelo Arévalo / (Netherlands) Jean-Julien Rojer (first round)
5. (United Kingdom) Lloyd Glasspool / (Finland) Harri Heliövaara (quarterfinals)
6. (India) Rohan Bopanna / (Australia) Matthew Ebden (first round)
7. (Spain) Marcel Granollers / (Argentina) Horacio Zeballos (first round)
8. (Monaco) Hugo Nys / (Poland) Jan Zieliński (first round)

== Draw ==
Key

- Q = Qualifier
- WC = Wild card
- LL = Lucky loser
- Alt = Alternate
- ITF = ITF entry
- PR = Protected ranking
- SR = Special ranking
- SE = Special exempt
- JE = Junior exempt
- JR = Junior Accelerator Programme entrant
- CO = College Accelerator Programme entrant
- NG = Next Gen Accelerator Program entrant
- w/o = Walkover
- r = Retired
- d = Defaulted

=== Finals ===
Semifinals
(Mexico) Santiago González (France) Édouard Roger-Vasselin	6	5	[12]
(United States) Nathaniel Lammons (United States) Jackson Withrow	4	7	[10]
(United States) Austin Krajicek (France) Nicolas Mahut	5	7	[10]
(Germany) Kevin Krawietz (France) Fabrice Martin	7	5	[8]

Final
(Mexico) Santiago González (France) Édouard Roger-Vasselin	7^{7}	7
(United States) Austin Krajicek (France) Nicolas Mahut	6^{4}	5

=== Top half ===
First round
1	(Netherlands) W Koolhof (United Kingdom) N Skupski	6	6
(Australia) R Hijikata (Australia) J Kubler	1	2
WC	(Brazil) M Demoliner (United States) C Eubanks	5	4
(United States) M McDonald (Netherlands) B van de Zandschulp	7	6
(Austria) A Erler (Austria) L Miedler	4	2
(Colombia) JS Cabal (Colombia) R Farah	6	6
(Mexico) S González (France) É Roger-Vasselin	7^{7}	7^{7}
7	(Spain) M Granollers (Argentina) H Zeballos	6^{4}	6^{3}
4	(El Salvador) M Arévalo (Netherlands) J-J Rojer	4	6^{10}
(United Kingdom) J Murray (New Zealand) M Venus	6	7^{12}
Alt	(Ecuador) G Escobar (France) F Reboul	6^{2}	6^{4}
(United States) N Lammons (United States) J Withrow	7^{7}	7^{7}
(Kazakhstan) A Bublik (Serbia) M Kecmanović	6	6
(Argentina) P Cachin (Argentina) F Cerúndolo	3	3
(United States) M Cressy (Germany) A Mies	3	1
5	(United Kingdom) L Glasspool (Finland) H Heliövaara	6	6

Second round
1	(Netherlands) W Koolhof (United Kingdom) N Skupski	6	7^{7}
(United States) M McDonald (Netherlands) B van de Zandschulp	4	6^{5}
(Colombia) JS Cabal (Colombia) R Farah	3	4
(Mexico) S González (France) É Roger-Vasselin	6	6
(United Kingdom) J Murray (New Zealand) M Venus	6^{2}	4
(United States) N Lammons (United States) J Withrow	7^{7}	6
(Kazakhstan) A Bublik (Serbia) M Kecmanović	2	2
5	(United Kingdom) L Glasspool (Finland) H Heliövaara	6	6

Quarterfinals
1	(Netherlands) W Koolhof (United Kingdom) N Skupski	6	6^{5}	[5]
(Mexico) S González (France) É Roger-Vasselin	4	7^{7}	[10]
(United States) N Lammons (United States) J Withrow	7^{7}	3	[11]
5	(United Kingdom) L Glasspool (Finland) H Heliövaara	6^{3}	6	[9]

Semifinals
(Mexico) S González (France) É Roger-Vasselin	6	5	[12]
(United States) N Lammons (United States) J Withrow	4	7	[10]

=== Bottom half ===
First round
8	(Monaco) H Nys (Poland) J Zieliński	6	4	[8]
(Argentina) M González (Argentina) A Molteni	4	6	[10]
WC	(United States) M Giron (United States) JJ Wolf	4	6^{5}
(Brazil) M Melo (Australia) J Peers	6	7^{7}
(Spain) J Munar (Spain) B Zapata Miralles	2	6^{3}
(Brazil) R Matos (Spain) D Vega Hernández	6	7^{7}
(United States) A Krajicek (France) N Mahut	6	6^{6}	[10]
3	(Croatia) N Mektić (Croatia) M Pavić	3	7^{8}	[7]
6	(India) R Bopanna (Australia) M Ebden	5	6	[4]
(Germany) K Krawietz (France) F Martin	7	4	[10]
(Netherlands) R Haase (Netherlands) M Middelkoop	6	6
(Argentina) S Báez (Argentina) TM Etcheverry	3	3
WC	(United States) M Damm (China) J Shang	7^{9}	3	[8]
(United States) T Paul (United States) B Shelton	6^{7}	6	[10]
(Italy) S Bolelli (Italy) F Fognini	4	3
2	(United States) R Ram (United Kingdom) J Salisbury	6	6

Second round
(Argentina) M González (Argentina) A Molteni	6	6^{5}	[10]
(Brazil) M Melo (Australia) J Peers	4	7^{7}	[6]
(Brazil) R Matos (Spain) D Vega Hernández	3	5
(United States) A Krajicek (France) N Mahut	6	7
(Germany) K Krawietz (France) F Martin	6^{8}	7^{7}	[10]
(Netherlands) R Haase (Netherlands) M Middelkoop	7^{10}	6^{4}	[7]
(United States) T Paul (United States) B Shelton	6	6
2	(United States) R Ram (United Kingdom) J Salisbury	3	4

Quarterfinals
(Argentina) M González (Argentina) A Molteni	3	7^{10}	[7]
(United States) A Krajicek (France) N Mahut	6	6^{8}	[10]
(Germany) K Krawietz (France) F Martin	6	7
(United States) T Paul (United States) B Shelton	3	5

Semifinals
(United States) A Krajicek (France) N Mahut	5	7	[10]
(Germany) K Krawietz (France) F Martin	7	5	[8]

== Seeded teams ==
The following are the seeded teams. Seedings are based on ATP rankings as of March 20, 2023.

Country	Player	Country	Player	Rank	Seed
NED	Wesley Koolhof	GBR	Neal Skupski	2	1
USA	Rajeev Ram	GBR	Joe Salisbury	7	2
CRO	Nikola Mektić	CRO	Mate Pavić	11	3
ESA	Marcelo Arévalo	NED	Jean-Julien Rojer	14	4
GBR	Lloyd Glasspool	FIN	Harri Heliövaara	25	5
IND	Rohan Bopanna	AUS	Matthew Ebden	29	6
ESP	Marcel Granollers	ARG	Horacio Zeballos	32	7
MON	Hugo Nys	POL	Jan Zieliński	34	8

== Other entry information ==
=== Wildcards ===
- (United States) Martin Damm / (China) Shang Juncheng
- (Brazil) Marcelo Demoliner / (United States) Christopher Eubanks
- (United States) Marcos Giron / (United States) J. J. Wolf

=== Alternates ===
- (Ecuador) Gonzalo Escobar / (France) Fabien Reboul

=== Withdrawals ===
- (Spain) Pablo Carreño Busta / (Spain) Jaume Munar → replaced by (Spain) Jaume Munar / (Spain) Bernabé Zapata Miralles
- (Croatia) Ivan Dodig / (United States) Austin Krajicek → replaced by (United States) Austin Krajicek / (France) Nicolas Mahut
- (Poland) Hubert Hurkacz / (United States) John Isner → replaced by (Ecuador) Gonzalo Escobar / (France) Fabien Reboul
