= Jasmine Paolini career statistics =

Tennis statistics of Italian tennis player Jasmine Paolini

Career finals
Discipline	Type	Won	Lost	Total
Singles	Grand Slam	0	2	2
Singles	WTA Finals	–	–	–
Singles	WTA Elite	–	–	–
Singles	WTA 1000 (Note: Formerly known as: WTA Premier Mandatory and Premier 5 (until 2021))	2	1	3
Singles	WTA 500 (Note: Formerly known as: WTA Premier (until 2021))	–	–	–
Singles	WTA 250 (Note: Formerly known as: WTA International (until 2021))	1	3	4
Singles	Olympics	–	–	–
Singles	Total	3	6	9
Doubles	Grand Slam	1	1	2
Doubles	WTA Finals	–	–	–
Doubles	WTA Elite	–	–	–
Doubles	WTA 1000	5	1	6
Doubles	WTA 500	1	1	2
Doubles	WTA 250	2	1	3
Doubles	Olympics	1	0	1
Doubles	Total	10	4	14

The list covers the main career statistics of Italian professional tennis player Jasmine Paolini.

== Performance timelines ==
Key
W	F	SF	QF	#R	RR	Q#	DNQ	A	NH

(W) winner; (F) finalist; (SF) semifinalist; (QF) quarterfinalist; (#R) rounds 4, 3, 2, 1; (RR) round-robin stage; (Q#) qualification round; (DNQ) did not qualify; (A) absent; (NH) not held; (SR) strike rate (events won / competed); (W–L) win–loss record.
To avoid confusion and double counting, these charts are updated at the conclusion of a tournament or when the player's participation has ended.

Only main-draw results in WTA Tour, Grand Slam tournaments, Billie Jean King Cup, United Cup, Hopman Cup and Olympic Games are included in win–loss records.

=== Singles ===
Current through the 2026 Japan Open.

Tournament	2017	2018	2019	2020	2021	2022	2023	2024	2025	2026	SR	W–L	Win%
Grand Slam tournaments
Australian Open	Q1	Q1	Q1	1R	1R	1R	1R	4R	3R	3R	0 / 7	7–7	50%
French Open	Q1	Q1	1R	2R	2R	1R	2R	F	4R	2R	0 / 8	13–8	62%
Wimbledon	Q2	Q1	Q1	NH	1R	1R	1R	F	2R	QF	0 / 6	11–6	65%
US Open	Q2	Q2	Q2	1R	2R	1R	1R	4R	3R	3R	0 / 7	8–7	53%
Win–Loss	0–0	0–0	0–1	1–3	2–4	0–4	1–4	18–4	8–4	9–4	0 / 28	39–28	58%
Year-end championships
WTA Finals	Did Not Qualify			NH	Did Not Qualify			RR	RR	DNQ	0 / 2	1–5	17%
National representation
Billie Jean King Cup (Note: Formerly known as Fed Cup until 2020.)	WG2	PO	WG2	PO (Note: Edition was split into the two years due to COVID-19.)		RR	F	W	W	SF	2 / 5	13–9	59%
Summer Olympics	Not Held				1R	Not Held		3R	Not Held		0 / 2	2–2	50%
WTA 1000 tournaments
Qatar Open	NTI	A	NTI	A	NTI	1R	NTI	1R	3R	2R	0 / 4	1–4	20%
Dubai Championships	A	NTI	A	NTI	A	NTI	1R	W (Note: Paolini advanced via walkover in her quarterfinal match. This is not counted as a win.)	3R	2R	1 / 4	6–3	67%
Indian Wells Open	A	A	A	NH	3R	3R	1R	4R	4R	4R	0 / 6	10–6	63%
Miami Open	A	A	A	NH	Q1	1R	1R	3R	SF	3R	0 / 5	6–5	55%
Madrid Open	A	A	A	NH	Q1	1R	1R	4R	3R	3R	0 / 5	4–5	44%
Italian Open	A	A	1R	2R	A	1R	2R	2R	W	3R	1 / 7	9–6	60%
Canadian Open	A	A	A	NH	A	A	3R (Note: Paolini advanced via walkover in her second-round match. This is not counted as a win.)	A	2R	A	0 / 2	1–2	33%
Cincinnati Open	A	A	A	Q1	1R	Q1	QF	3R	F	A	0 / 4	9–4	69%
China Open	A	A	A	Not held			3R	3R	QF	2R	0 / 4	6–4	60%
Wuhan Open	A	A	A	Not held				QF	SF	3R	0 / 3	7–3	70%
Guadalajara Open	Not Held					A	2R	Not Tier I			0 / 1	1–1	50%
Win–Loss	0–0	0–0	0–1	1–1	2–2	2–5	8–9	14–8	26–9	7–8	2 / 46	60–43	58%
Career statistics
	2017	2018	2019	2020	2021	2022	2023	2024	2025	2026	SR	W–L	Win%
Tournaments	2	5	9	8	20	20	23	19	19	17	Career total: 142		
Titles	0	0	0	0	1	0	0	1	1	0	Career total: 3		
Finals	0	0	0	0	1	1	2	3	2	0	Career total: 9		
Overall win–loss	0–2	3–7	6–10	6–8	20–20	22–21	27–25	42–21	46–21	20–18	3/138	192–153	56%
Win %	0%	30%	38%	43%	50%	51%	52%	67%	69%	53%	Career total: 56%		
Year-end ranking (Note: 2013: WTA ranking–624, 2014: WTA ranking–327.)	137	190	117	95	53	59	30	4	8	35	$16,735,319		

=== Doubles ===
Current through the 2026 Japan Open.

Tournament	2015	2016	2017	2018	2019	2020	2021	2022	2023	2024	2025	2026	SR	W–L	Win%
Grand Slam tournaments
Australian Open	A	A	A	A	A	A	3R	2R	1R	3R	2R	2R	0 / 6	7–6	54%
French Open	A	A	A	A	A	2R	1R	1R	2R	F	W	A	1 / 6	13–5	72%
Wimbledon	A	A	A	A	A	NH	A	1R	1R	3R	2R	A	0 / 4	3–4	43%
US Open	A	A	A	A	A	A	1R	A	1R	2R	SF	A	0 / 4	5–4	56%
Win–Loss	0–0	0–0	0–0	0–0	0–0	1–1	2–3	1–3	1–4	10–4	12–3	1–1	1 / 20	28–19	60%
Year-end championships
WTA Finals	Did Not Qualify					NH	Did Not Qualify			RR	RR		0 / 2	2–4	33%
National representation
Billie Jean King Cup	A	A	WG2	PO	WG2	PO		RR	F	W	W	SF	2 / 5	6–3	67%
Summer Olympics	NH	A	Not held				2R	Not held		G	Not held		1 / 2	6–1	86%
WTA 1000 tournaments
Qatar Open	NTI	A	NTI	A	NTI	A	NTI	1R	NTI	1R	W	SF	1 / 4	6–3	67%
Dubai Championships	A	NTI	A	NTI	A	NTI	A	NTI	A	A	2R (Note: Withdraw during the tournament. Not counted as a loss.)	2R	0 / 2	0–1	0%
Indian Wells Open	A	A	A	A	A	NH	A	A	A	1R	1R	SF	0 / 3	3–3	50%
Miami Open	A	A	A	A	A	NH	A	1R	A	SF	2R	F	0 / 4	8–4	67%
Madrid Open	A	A	A	A	A	NH	A	A	A	1R	2R	2R	0 / 3	2–3	40%
Italian Open	1R	A	A	A	1R	2R	A	2R	1R	W	W	2R	2 / 8	13–6	68%
Canadian Open	A	A	A	A	A	NH	A	A	A	A	2R	A	0 / 1	1–1	50%
Cincinnati Open	A	A	A	A	A	A	A	A	A	QF	SF	A	0 / 2	3–2	60%
China Open	A	A	A	A	A	Not held			A	W	W	QF	2 / 3	11–1	92%
Wuhan Open	A	A	A	A	A	Not Held				2R	2R	SF	0 / 3	3–2	60%
Guadalajara Open	Not held							A	SF	Not Tier I			0 / 1	3–1	75%
Win–loss	0–1	0–0	0–0	0–0	0–1	1–1	0–0	1–3	3–2	14–6	18–5	16–8	5 / 34	53–27	66%
Career statistics
Tournaments	1	0	0	0	3	3	7	9	10	17	16	12	Career total: 78		
Titles	0	0	0	0	0	0	1	0	1	4	4	1	Career total: 11		
Finals	0	0	0	0	0	0	1	1	1	5	5	2	Career total: 15		
Overall win–loss	0–1	0–0	1–0	0–2	0–3	3–3	7–6	8–10	12–10	36–14	34–12	21–10	11 / 78	122–71	63%
Win %	0%	–	100%	0%	0%	50%	54%	44%	55%	72%	74%	68%	Career total: 63%		
Year-end ranking	n/a	939	n/a	758	938	263	166	141	97	10	3		$16,753,319		

== Grand Slam tournament finals ==
=== Singles: 2 (2 runner-ups) ===
Result	Year	Tournament	Surface	Opponent	Score
Loss	2024	French Open	Clay	(Poland) Iga Świątek	2–6, 1–6
Loss	2024	Wimbledon	Grass	(Czech Republic) Barbora Krejčíková	2–6, 6–2, 4–6

=== Doubles: 2 (1 title, 1 runner-up) ===
Result	Year	Tournament	Surface	Partner	Opponents	Score
Loss	2024	French Open	Clay	(Italy) Sara Errani	(United States) Coco Gauff (Czech Republic) Kateřina Siniaková	6–7^{(5–7)}, 3–6
Win	2025	French Open	Clay	(Italy) Sara Errani	(Kazakhstan) Anna Danilina (Serbia) Aleksandra Krunić	6–4, 2–6, 6–1

== Other significant finals ==
=== WTA 1000 tournaments ===
==== Singles: 3 (2 titles, 1 runner-up) ====
Result	Year	Tournament	Surface	Opponent	Score
Win	2024	Dubai Championships	Hard	Anna Kalinskaya	4–6, 7–5, 7–5
Win	2025	Italian Open	Clay	(United States) Coco Gauff	6–4, 6–2
Loss	2025	Cincinnati Open	Hard	(Poland) Iga Świątek	5–7, 4–6

==== Doubles: 6 (5 titles, 1 runner-up) ====
Result	Year	Tournament	Surface	Partner	Opponents	Score
Win	2024	Italian Open	Clay	(Italy) Sara Errani	(United States) Coco Gauff (New Zealand) Erin Routliffe	6–3, 4–6, [10–8]
Win	2024	China Open	Hard	(Italy) Sara Errani	(Chinese Taipei) Chan Hao-ching; Veronika Kudermetova	6–4, 6–4
Win	2025	Qatar Ladies Open	Hard	(Italy) Sara Errani	(China) Jiang Xinyu (Chinese Taipei) Wu Fang-hsien	7–5, 7–6^{(12–10)}
Win	2025	Italian Open (2)	Clay	(Italy) Sara Errani	Veronika Kudermetova (Belgium) Elise Mertens	6–4, 7–5
Win	2025	China Open (2)	Hard	(Italy) Sara Errani	(Japan) Miyu Kato (Hungary) Fanny Stollár	6–7^{(1–7)}, 6–3, [10–2]
Loss	2026	Miami Open	Hard	(Italy) Sara Errani	(Czech Republic) Kateřina Siniaková (United States) Taylor Townsend	6–7^{(0–7)}, 1–6

=== Summer Olympics ===
==== Doubles: 1 (gold) ====
Result	Year	Tournament	Surface	Partner	Opponents	Score
Gold	2024	Paris Summer Olympics	Clay	(Italy) Sara Errani	Mirra Andreeva; Diana Shnaider	2–6, 6–1, [10–7]

== WTA Tour finals ==
=== Singles: 9 (3 titles, 6 runner-ups) ===
Legend Grand Slam (0–2) WTA 1000 (2–1) WTA 250 (1–3)	Finals by surface Hard (2–3) Clay (1–2) Grass (0–1)	Finals by setting Outdoor (3–5) Indoor (0–1)

Result	W–L	Date	Tournament	Tier	Surface	Opponent	Score
Win	1–0	Sep 2021	Portorož Open, Slovenia	WTA 250	Hard	(United States) Alison Riske	7–6^{(7–4)}, 6–2
Loss	1–1	Oct 2022	Transylvania Open, Romania	WTA 250	Hard (i)	Anna Blinkova	2–6, 6–3, 2–6
Loss	1–2	Jul 2023	Palermo Ladies Open, Italy	WTA 250	Clay	(China) Zheng Qinwen	4–6, 6–1, 1–6
Loss	1–3	Oct 2023	Jasmin Open, Tunisia	WTA 250	Hard	(Belgium) Elise Mertens	3–6, 0–6
Win	2–3	Feb 2024	Dubai Open, UAE	WTA 1000	Hard	Anna Kalinskaya	4–6, 7–5, 7–5
Loss	2–4	Jun 2024	French Open, France	Grand Slam	Clay	(Poland) Iga Świątek	2–6, 1–6
Loss	2–5	Jul 2024	Wimbledon, UK	Grand Slam	Grass	(Czech Republic) Barbora Krejčíková	2–6, 6–2, 4–6
Win	3–5	May 2025	Italian Open, Italy	WTA 1000	Clay	(United States) Coco Gauff	6–4, 6–2
Loss	3–6	Aug 2025	Cincinnati Open, US	WTA 1000	Hard	(Poland) Iga Świątek	5–7, 4–6

=== Doubles: 15 (11 titles, 4 runner-ups) ===
Legend Grand Slam (1–1) Olympic Games (1–0) WTA 1000 (5–1) WTA 500 (2–1) WTA 250 (2–1)	Finals by surface Hard (5–2) Clay (5–1) Grass (0–1)	Finals by setting Outdoor (9–3) Indoor (1–0)

Result	W–L	Date	Tournament	Tier	Surface	Partner	Opponents	Score
Win	1–0	Jul 2021	Hamburg Open, Germany	WTA 250	Clay	(Switzerland) Jil Teichmann	(Australia) Astra Sharma (Netherlands) Rosalie van der Hoek	6–0, 6–4
Loss	1–1	Jan 2022	Melbourne Summer Set, Australia	WTA 250	Hard	(Italy) Sara Errani	(United States) Asia Muhammad (United States) Jessica Pegula	3–6, 1–6
Win	2–1	Oct 2023	Jasmin Open, Tunisia	WTA 250	Hard	(Italy) Sara Errani	(Japan) Mai Hontama (Serbia) Natalija Stevanović	2–6, 7–6^{(7–4)}, [10–6]
Win	3–1	Feb 2024	Ladies Linz, Austria	WTA 500	Hard (i)	(Italy) Sara Errani	(United States) Nicole Melichar-Martinez (Australia) Ellen Perez	7–5, 4–6, [10–7]
Win	4–1	May 2024	Italian Open, Italy	WTA 1000	Clay	(Italy) Sara Errani	(United States) Coco Gauff (New Zealand) Erin Routliffe	6–3, 4–6, [10–8]
Loss	4–2	Jun 2024	French Open, France	Grand Slam	Clay	(Italy) Sara Errani	(United States) Coco Gauff (Czech Republic) Kateřina Siniaková	6–7^{(5–7)}, 3–6
Win	5–2	Aug 2024	Paris Olympics, France	Olympics	Clay	(Italy) Sara Errani	(Individual Neutral Athletes) Mirra Andreeva (Individual Neutral Athletes) Diana Shnaider	2–6, 6–1, [10–7]
Win	6–2	Oct 2024	China Open, China	WTA 1000	Hard	(Italy) Sara Errani	(Chinese Taipei) Chan Hao-ching; Veronika Kudermetova	6–4, 6–4
Win	7–2	Feb 2025	Qatar Open, Qatar	WTA 1000	Hard	(Italy) Sara Errani	(China) Jiang Xinyu (Chinese Taipei) Wu Fang-hsien	7–5, 7–6^{(12–10)}
Win	8–2	May 2025	Italian Open, Italy (2)	WTA 1000	Clay	(Italy) Sara Errani	Veronika Kudermetova (Belgium) Elise Mertens	6–4, 7–5
Win	9–2	Jun 2025	French Open, France	Grand Slam	Clay	(Italy) Sara Errani	(Kazakhstan) Anna Danilina (Serbia) Aleksandra Krunić	6–4, 2–6, 6–1
Loss	9–3	Jun 2025	Berlin Open, Germany	WTA 500	Grass	(Italy) Sara Errani	(Slovakia) Tereza Mihalíková (United Kingdom) Olivia Nicholls	6−4, 2−6, [6−10]
Win	10–3	Oct 2025	China Open, China	WTA 1000	Hard	(Italy) Sara Errani	(Japan) Miyu Kato (Hungary) Fanny Stollár	6–7^{(1–7)}, 6–3, [10–2]
Loss	10–4	Mar 2026	Miami Open, US	WTA 1000	Hard	(Italy) Sara Errani	(Czech Republic) Kateřina Siniaková (United States) Taylor Townsend	6–7^{(0–7)}, 1–6
Win	11–4	Oct 2026	Pan Pacific Open, Japan	WTA 500	Hard	(Italy) Sara Errani	(Canada) Gabriela Dabrowski (Brazil) Luisa Stefani	6–2, 6–2

== WTA 125 finals ==
=== Singles: 4 (2 titles, 2 runner-ups) ===
Result	W–L	Date	Tournament	Surface	Opponent	Score
Loss	0–1	May 2021	Open de Saint-Malo, France	Clay	(Switzerland) Viktorija Golubic	1–6, 3–6
Win	1–1	Jun 2021	Bol Ladies Open, Croatia	Clay	(Netherlands) Arantxa Rus	6–2, 7–6^{(7–4)}
Win	2–1	May 2023	Firenze Ladies Open, Italy	Clay	(United States) Taylor Townsend	6–3, 7–5
Loss	2–2	Jun 2023	Makarska Open, Croatia	Clay	(Egypt) Mayar Sherif	6–2, 6–7^{(6–8)}, 5–7

== National team competition finals ==
=== BJK Cup: 3 (2 titles, 1 runner-up) ===
Result	Date	Tournament	Surface	Team	Partners	Opponent team	Opponent players	Score
Loss	Nov 2023	Billie Jean King Cup	Hard (i)	Italy	Martina Trevisan; Elisabetta Cocciaretto; Lucia Bronzetti; Lucrezia Stefanini	Canada	Leylah Fernandez; Rebecca Marino; Marina Stakusic; Eugenie Bouchard; Gabriela Dabrowski	0–2
Win	Nov 2024	Billie Jean King Cup	Hard (i)	Italy	Elisabetta Cocciaretto; Lucia Bronzetti; Sara Errani; Martina Trevisan	Slovakia	Rebecca Šramková; Anna Karolína Schmiedlová; Viktória Hrunčáková; Renáta Jamrichová; Tereza Mihalíková	2–0
Win	Sep 2025	Billie Jean King Cup	Hard (i)	Italy	Sara Errani; Lucia Bronzetti; Elisabetta Cocciaretto; Tyra Caterina Grant	United States	Jessica Pegula; Emma Navarro; McCartney Kessler; Hailey Baptiste; Taylor Townsend	2–0

== ITF Circuit finals ==
=== Singles: 16 (9 titles, 7 runner-ups) ===
Legend $100,000 tournaments (2–1) $60,000 tournaments (1–0) $25,000 tournaments (3–5) $10,000 tournaments (3–1)	Finals by surface Hard (2–2) Clay (7–5)

Result	W–L	Date	Tournament	Tier	Surface	Opponent	Score
Loss	0–1	Jun 2013	ITF Rome, Italy	10,000	Clay	(Italy) Martina Caregaro	2–6, 3–6
Win	1–1	Aug 2013	ITF Locri, Italy	10,000	Clay	(France) Jade Suvrijn	6–1, 7–5
Win	2–1	Jul 2014	ITF Viserba, Italy	10,000	Clay	(Italy) Anna Remondina	6–1, 6–0
Loss	2–2	Sep 2014	Telavi Open, Georgia	25,000	Clay	(Russia) Daria Kasatkina	1–6, 6–4, [7–10]
Win	3–2	Apr 2016	ITF Pula, Italy	10,000	Clay	(France) Tessah Andrianjafitrimo	1–0 ret.
Loss	3–3	Aug 2016	ITF Bad Saulgau, Germany	25,000	Clay	(Germany) Tamara Korpatsch	2–6, 3–6
Loss	3–4	Sep 2016	ITF Mamaia, Romania	25,000	Clay	(Italy) Jessica Pieri	3–6, 4–6
Loss	3–5	Oct 2016	ITF Clermont-Ferrand, France	25,000	Hard (i)	(Netherlands) Richèl Hogenkamp	4–6, 2–6
Win	4–5	Nov 2016	Open de Valencia, Spain	25,000	Clay	(Netherlands) Quirine Lemoine	6–1, 2–6, 6–4
Win	5–5	Jun 2017	Open de Marseille, France	100,000	Clay	(Germany) Tatjana Maria	6–4, 2–6, 6–1
Win	6–5	Aug 2017	ITF Woking, United Kingdom	25,000	Hard	(Romania) Mihaela Buzărnescu	6–4, 1–6, 6–4
Loss	6–6	Sep 2018	ITF Bagnatica, Italy	25,000	Clay	(Slovenia) Kaja Juvan	7–6^{(8)}, 1–6, 5–7
Win	7–6	Mar 2019	ITF Curitiba, Brazil	25,000	Clay	(Hungary) Anna Bondár	4–6, 6–4, 6–2
Win	8–6	Jun 2019	Internazionali di Brescia, Italy	60,000	Clay	(Latvia) Diāna Marcinkeviča	6–2, 6–1
Loss	8–7	Nov 2019	Tokyo Open, Japan	100,000	Hard	(China) Zhang Shuai	3–6, 5–7
Win	9–7	Oct 2022	ITF Les Franqueses del Vallès, Spain	100,000	Hard	(Ukraine) Kateryna Baindl	6–4, 6–4

=== Doubles: 4 (1 title, 3 runner-ups) ===
Legend $25,000 tournaments (0–1) $10,000 tournaments (1–2)	Finals by surface Clay (1–3)

Result	W–L	Date	Tournament	Tier	Surface	Partner	Opponents	Score
Loss	0–1	Jun 2013	ITF Rome, Italy	10,000	Clay	(Italy) Claudia Giovine	(Romania) Bianca Hîncu (Italy) Martina di Giuseppe	1–6, 3–6
Win	1–1	Sep 2013	ITF Pula, Italy	10,000	Clay	(Italy) Giorgia Marchetti	(Australia) Alexandra Nancarrow (Germany) Laura Schaeder	7–6^{(3)}, 7–6^{(3)}
Loss	1–2	Mar 2016	ITF Weston, US	10,000	Clay	(Argentina) Julieta Estable	(United States) Katerina Stewart (Switzerland) Tess Sugnaux	6–7^{(2)}, 3–6
Loss	1–3	Sep 2018	ITF Bagnatica, Italy	25,000	Clay	(Italy) Deborah Chiesa	(Italy) Giorgia Marchetti (Italy) Camilla Rosatello	4–6, 6–4, [8–10]

== Career Grand Slam statistics ==
=== Seedings ===
The tournaments won by Paolini are in boldface, and advanced into finals by Paolini are in italics.

Year	Australian Open	French Open	Wimbledon	US Open
2017	did not qualify	did not qualify	did not qualify	did not qualify
2018	did not qualify	did not qualify	did not qualify	did not qualify
2019	did not qualify	qualifier	did not qualify	did not qualify
2020	not seeded	not seeded	cancelled	not seeded
2021	not seeded	not seeded	not seeded	not seeded
2022	not seeded	not seeded	not seeded	not seeded
2023	not seeded	not seeded	not seeded	not seeded
2024	26th	12th (1)	7th (2)	5th
2025	4th	4th	4th	7th
2026	7th	13th		

== Wins against top 10 players ==
- Paolini has a 11–28 (28%) record against players who were, at the time the match was played, ranked in the top 10.

Season	2019	2020	2021	2022	2023	2024	2025	2026	Total
Wins	0	0	0	1	2	3	5	0	**11**

#	Opponent	Rk	Event	Surface	Rd	Score	Rk	Ref
**2022**
1.	Aryna Sabalenka	3	Indian Wells Open, US	Hard	2R	2–6, 6–3, 6–3	46	
**2023**
2.	(Kazakhstan) Elena Rybakina	4	Cincinnati Open, US	Hard	3R	4–6, 5–2, ret.	43	
3.	(France) Caroline Garcia	10	Zhengzhou Open, China	Hard	2R	3–6, 6–4, 7–5	31	
**2024**
4.	(Tunisia) Ons Jabeur	9	Stuttgart Open, Germany	Clay (i)	2R	7–6^{(10–8)}, 6–4	14	
5.	(Kazakhstan) Elena Rybakina	4	French Open, France	Clay	QF	6–2, 4–6, 6–4	15	
6.	(Kazakhstan) Elena Rybakina	5	WTA Finals, Saudi Arabia	Hard (i)	RR	7–6^{(7–5)}, 6–4	4	
**2025**
7.	(United States) Coco Gauff	4	Stuttgart Open, Germany	Clay (i)	QF	6–4, 6–3	6	
8.	(United States) Coco Gauff	3	Italian Open, Italy	Clay	F	6–4, 6–2	5	
9.	(United States) Coco Gauff	2	Cincinnati Open, US	Hard	QF	2–6, 6–4, 6–3	9	
10.	(United States) Jessica Pegula	7	BJK Cup, China	Hard (i)	F	6–4, 6–2	8	
11.	(Poland) Iga Świątek	2	Wuhan Open, China	Hard	QF	6–1, 6–2	8	

- Key: (Rk) first use, opponent rank; (Rd) round; (Rk) 2nd use, player rank; (Ref) reference; (F) final; (SF) semifinal; (QF) quarterfinal; (#R) rounds 4, 3, 2, 1; (RR) round-robin stage; (Q#) qualifying rounds or stages (3), 2, 1.
