= Coco Gauff career statistics =

Career finals
Discipline	Type	Won	Lost	Total
Singles	Grand Slam	2	1	3
Singles	WTA Finals	1	0	1
Singles	WTA 1000	4	4	8
Singles	WTA 500	1	0	1
Singles	WTA 250	4	0	4
Singles	Olympics	–	–	–
Singles	Total	12	5	17
Doubles	Grand Slam	1	2	3
Doubles	WTA Finals	–	–	–
Doubles	WTA 1000	4	3	7
Doubles	WTA 500	2	1	3
Doubles	WTA 250	3	0	3
Doubles	Olympics	–	–	–
Doubles	Total	10	6	16

This is a list of career statistics of American tennis player Coco Gauff since her professional debut in 2018. Gauff has won twelve WTA Tour titles in singles and ten in doubles, as well as one ITF singles titles and one doubles title.

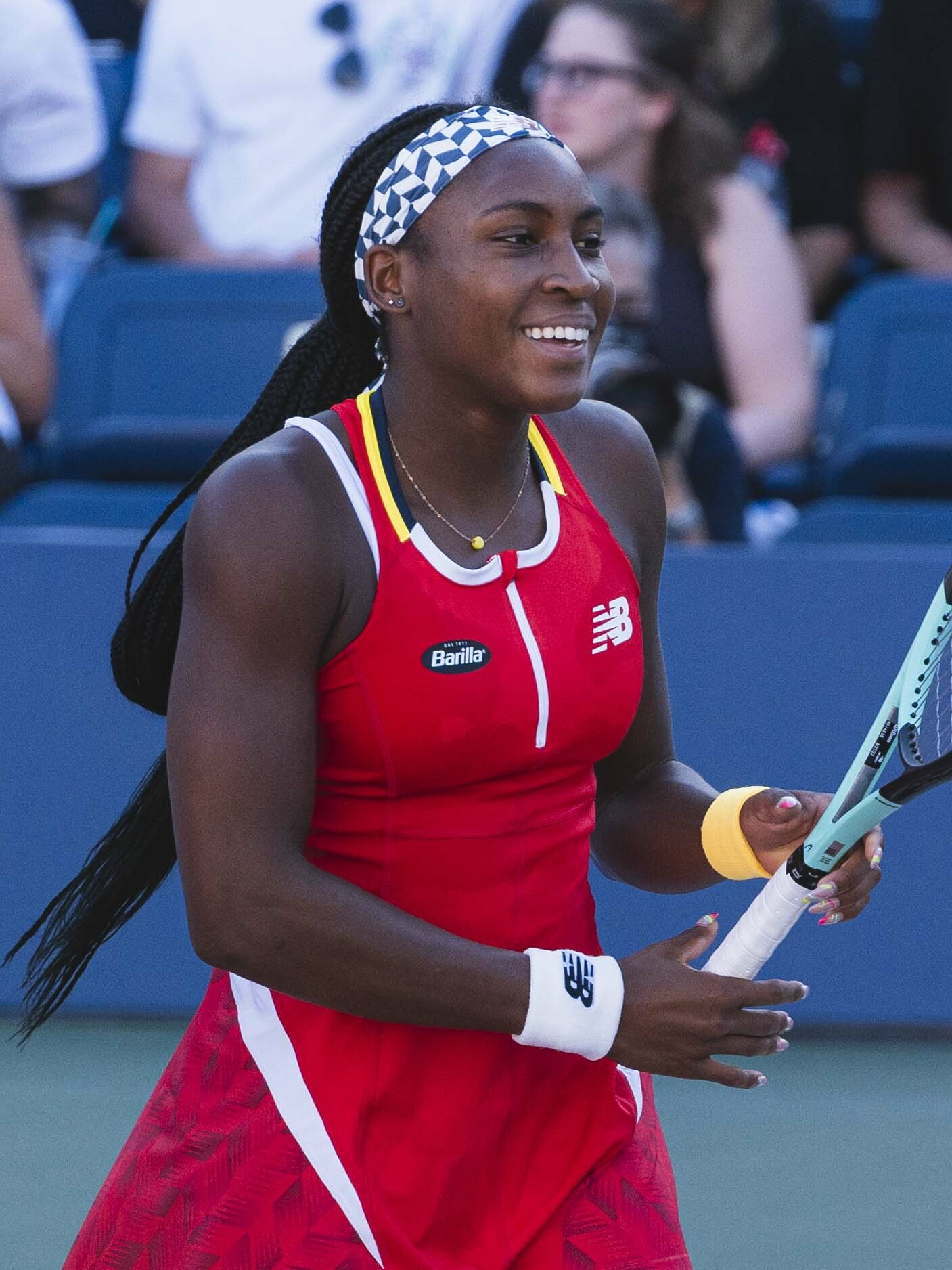
Gauff at the 2022 US Open

== Performance timelines ==
Key
W	F	SF	QF	#R	RR	Q#	P#	DNQ	A	Z#	PO	G	S	B	NMS	NTI	P	NH

(W) winner; (F) finalist; (SF) semifinalist; (QF) quarterfinalist; (#R) rounds 4, 3, 2, 1; (RR) round-robin stage; (Q#) qualification round; (P#) preliminary round; (DNQ) did not qualify; (A) absent; (Z#) Davis/Fed Cup Zonal Group (with number indication) or (PO) play-off; (G) gold, (S) silver or (B) bronze Olympic/Paralympic medal; (NMS) not a Masters tournament; (NTI) not a Tier I tournament; (P) postponed; (NH) not held; (SR) strike rate (events won / competed); (W–L) win–loss record.
To avoid confusion and double counting, these charts are updated at the conclusion of a tournament or when the player's participation has ended.

Only main-draw results in WTA Tour, Grand Slam tournaments, Billie Jean King Cup (Fed Cup), United Cup, Hopman Cup and Olympic Games are included in win–loss records.

=== Singles ===
Current through 2026 China Open.

Tournament	2018	2019	2020	2021	2022	2023	2024	2025	2026	SR	W–L	Win %
Grand Slam tournaments
Australian Open	A	A	4R	2R	1R	4R	SF	QF	QF	0 / 7	20–7	74%
French Open	A	Q2	2R	QF	F	QF	SF	W	3R	1 / 7	29–6	83%
Wimbledon	A	4R	NH	4R	3R	1R	4R	1R	SF	0 / 7	16–7	70%
US Open	Q1	3R	1R	2R	QF	W	4R	4R	SF	1 / 8	25–7	78%
Win–Loss	0–0	5–2	4–3	9–4	12–4	14–3	16–4	14–3	16–4	2 / 29	90–27	77%
Year-end championship
WTA Finals	DNQ	DNQ	NH	DNQ	RR	SF	W	RR	RR	1 / 5	9–9	50%
National representation
Billie Jean King Cup	A	A (Note: Edition is split into the two years due to COVID-19.)			RR	QR	A	A	A	0 / 1	1–1	50%
Summer Olympics	Not Held			A	Not Held		3R	Not Held		0 / 1	2–1	67%
WTA 1000 tournaments
Qatar Open	A	NTI	A	NTI	QF	NTI	2R	2R	2R	0 / 4	3–4	43%
Dubai Championships	NTI	A	NTI	QF	NTI	SF	QF	2R	SF	0 / 5	10–5	67%
Indian Wells Open	A	A	NH	3R	3R	QF	SF	4R	3R	0 / 6	12–6	67%
Miami Open	A	2R	NH	2R	4R	3R	4R	4R	F	0 / 7	13–7	57%
Madrid Open	A	A	NH	1R	3R	3R	4R	F	4R	0 / 6	12–6	67%
Italian Open	A	A	2R	SF	3R	3R	SF	F	F	0 / 7	22–7	79%
Canadian Open	A	A	NH	QF	QF	QF	3R	4R	SF	0 / 6	13–6	67%
Cincinnati Open	A	A	1R	2R	1R	W	2R	QF	W	2 / 7	14–5	74%
China Open	A	A	Not Held			SF	W	SF	4R	1 / 4	16–3	84%
Wuhan Open	A	A	Not Held				SF	W	A	1 / 2	8–1	89%
Guadalajara Open	Not Held				QF	A	Not Tier I			0 / 1	2–1	67%
Win–Loss	0–0	1–1	1–2	11–7	15–8	19–7	24–9	27–9	27–8	4 / 55	125–51	71%
Career statistics
	2018	2019	2020	2021	2022	2023	2024	2025	2026	SR	W–L	Win %
Tournaments	0	6	8	17	23	20	20	18	15	Career total: 127		
Titles	0	1	0	1	0	4	3	2	1	Career total: 12		
Finals	0	1	0	1	1	4	3	4	3	Career total: 17		
Hard Win–Loss	0–0	8–4	8–6	14–10	23–17	40–9	35–10	30–11	32–9	10 / 85	190–76	71%
Clay Win–Loss	0–0	0–0	2–2	16–4	10–4	7–4	14–5	18–3	10–4	2 / 28	77–26	75%
Grass Win–Loss	0–0	3–1	0–0	4–2	5–2	4–3	5–2	0–2	5–2	0 / 14	26–14	65%
Overall Win–Loss	0–0	11–5	10–8	34–16	38–23	51–16	54–17	48–16	45–14	12 / 127	291–115	72%
Win %	0%	69%	56%	68%	62%	76%	76%	75%	76%	Career total: 72%		
Year-end ranking	875	68	48	22	7	3	3	3	4	$35,280,897		

=== Doubles ===
Current after the 2026 Berlin Open.

Tournament	2019	2020	2021	2022	2023	2024	2025	2026	SR	W–L	Win %
Grand Slam tournaments
Australian Open	A	QF	QF	1R	SF	A	A	A	0 / 4	10–4	71%
French Open	1R	3R	1R	F	SF	W	A	A	1 / 6	17–5	77%
Wimbledon	A	NH	3R	A	3R	QF	A	A	0 / 3	7–3	70%
US Open	3R	2R	F	1R	QF	A	A		0 / 5	11–5	69%
Win–Loss	2–2	6–3	10–4	5–3	13–4	9–1	0–0	0–0	1 / 18	45–17	73%
Year-end championship
WTA Finals	DNQ	NH	DNQ	RR	RR	DNQ			0 / 2	0–6	0%
National representation
Billie Jean King Cup	A	A		RR	QR	A	A		0 / 1	2–0	100%
Summer Olympics	Not Held		A	Not Held		2R	Not Held		0 / 1	1–1	50%
WTA 1000 tournaments
Qatar Open	NTI	A	NTI	W	NTI	A	A	1R	1 / 2	4–1	80%
Dubai Championships	A	NTI	1R	NTI	QF	A	A	A	0 / 2	1–2	33%
Indian Wells Open	A	NH	QF	QF	2R	QF	A	A	0 / 4	7–4	64%
Miami Open	A	NH	QF	SF	W	1R	A	A	1 / 4	10–3	77%
Madrid Open	A	NH	1R	QF	F	QF	QF	2R	0 / 6	11–5	69%
Italian Open	A	2R	QF	1R	F	F	QF	QF	0 / 7	15–6	71%
Canadian Open	A	NH	1R	W	QF	A	W	2R	2 / 5	10–2	83%
Cincinnati Open	A	2R	2R	A	A	A	A		0 / 2	2–2	50%
China Open	A	Not Held			2R	A	A		0 / 1	0–1	0%
Wuhan Open	A	Not Held				A	A		0 / 0	0–0	–
Guadalajara Open	Not Held			QF	A	Not Tier I			0 / 1	1–1	50%
Win–Loss	0–0	2–2	7–7	14–5	16–5	8–4	4–2	4–2	4 / 33	61–27	69%
Career statistics
	2019	2020	2021	2022	2023	2024	2025	2026	SR	W–L	Win %
Tournaments	5	7	18	15	15	8	3	4	Career total: 75		
Titles	2	0	1	3	2	1	1	0	Career total: 10		
Finals	2	0	2	5	4	2	1	0	Career total: 16		
Overall Win–Loss	12–3	10–7	25–16	27–14	36–12	18–7	9–2	4–2	10 / 75	141–63	69%
Win %	80%	59%	61%	66%	75%	72%	82%	67%	Career total: 69%		
Year-end ranking	78	45	21	4	3	25	61				

=== Mixed doubles ===
Tournament	2018	2019	2020	2021	2022	2023	2024	SR	W–L	Win %
Grand Slam tournaments
Australian Open	A	A	A	A	A	A	A	0 / 0	0–0	–
French Open	A	A	A	A	A	A	A	0 / 0	0–0	–
Wimbledon	A	1R	NH	A	SF	A	A	0 / 2	3–2	60%
US Open	2R	A	A	A	A	1R	A	0 / 2	1–2	33%
Win–Loss	1–1	0–1	0–0	0–0	3–1	0–1	0–0	0 / 4	4–4	50%
National representation
Summer Olympics	Not Held			A	Not Held		QF	0 / 1	1–1	50%

== Grand Slam tournament finals ==
=== Singles: 3 (2 titles, 1 runner-up) ===
Result	Year	Tournament	Surface	Opponent	Score
Loss	2022	French Open	Clay	(Poland) Iga Świątek	1–6, 3–6
Win	2023	US Open	Hard	Aryna Sabalenka	2–6, 6–3, 6–2
Win	2025	French Open	Clay	Aryna Sabalenka	6–7^{(5–7)}, 6–2, 6–4

=== Doubles: 3 (1 title, 2 runner-ups) ===
Result	Year	Tournament	Surface	Partner	Opponents	Score
Loss	2021	US Open	Hard	(United States) Caty McNally	(Australia) Samantha Stosur (China) Zhang Shuai	3–6, 6–3, 3–6
Loss	2022	French Open	Clay	(United States) Jessica Pegula	(France) Caroline Garcia (France) Kristina Mladenovic	6–2, 3–6, 2–6
Win	2024	French Open	Clay	(Czech Republic) Kateřina Siniaková	(Italy) Sara Errani (Italy) Jasmine Paolini	7–6^{(7–5)}, 6–3

== Other significant finals ==
=== WTA Finals ===
==== Singles: 1 (title) ====
Result	Year	Tournament	Surface	Opponent	Score
Win	2024	WTA Finals, Saudi Arabia	Hard (i)	(China) Zheng Qinwen	3–6, 6–4, 7–6^{(7–2)}

=== WTA 1000 tournaments ===
==== Singles: 8 (4 titles, 4 runner-ups) ====
Result	Year	Tournament	Surface	Opponent	Score
Win	2023	Cincinnati Open	Hard	(Czech Republic) Karolína Muchová	6–3, 6–4
Win	2024	China Open	Hard	(Czech Republic) Karolína Muchová	6–1, 6–3
Loss	2025	Madrid Open	Clay	Aryna Sabalenka	3–6, 6–7^{(3–7)}
Loss	2025	Italian Open	Clay	(Italy) Jasmine Paolini	4–6, 2–6
Win	2025	Wuhan Open	Hard	(United States) Jessica Pegula	6–4, 7–5
Loss	2026	Miami Open	Hard	Aryna Sabalenka	2–6, 6–4, 3–6
Loss	2026	Italian Open	Clay	(Ukraine) Elina Svitolina	4–6, 7–6^{(7–3)}, 2–6
Win	2026	Cincinnati Open (2)	Hard	(United States) Jessica Pegula	6–2, 6–4

==== Doubles: 7 (4 titles, 3 runner-ups) ====
Result	Year	Tournament	Surface	Partner	Opponents	Score
Win	2022	Qatar Open	Hard	(United States) Jessica Pegula	(Russia) Veronika Kudermetova (Belgium) Elise Mertens	3–6, 7–5, [10–5]
Win	2022	Canadian Open	Hard	(United States) Jessica Pegula	(United States) Nicole Melichar-Martinez (Australia) Ellen Perez	6–4, 6–7^{(5–7)}, [10–5]
Win	2023	Miami Open	Hard	(United States) Jessica Pegula	(Canada) Leylah Fernandez (United States) Taylor Townsend	7–6^{(8–6)}, 6–2
Loss	2023	Madrid Open	Clay	(United States) Jessica Pegula	Victoria Azarenka (Brazil) Beatriz Haddad Maia	1–6, 4–6
Loss	2023	Italian Open	Clay	(United States) Jessica Pegula	(Australia) Storm Hunter (Belgium) Elise Mertens	4–6, 4–6
Loss	2024	Italian Open	Clay	(New Zealand) Erin Routliffe	(Italy) Sara Errani (Italy) Jasmine Paolini	3–6, 6–4, [8–10]
Win	2025	Canadian Open (2)	Hard	(United States) McCartney Kessler	(United States) Taylor Townsend (China) Zhang Shuai	6–4, 1–6, [13–11]

== WTA Tour finals ==
=== Singles: 17 (12 titles, 5 runner-ups) ===
Legend Grand Slam (2–1) WTA Finals (1–0) WTA 1000 (4–4) WTA 500 (1–0) International / WTA 250 (4–0)	Finals by surface Hard (10–1) Clay (2–4)	Finals by setting Outdoor (10–5) Indoor (2–0)

Result	W–L	Date	Tournament	Tier	Surface	Opponent	Score
Win	1–0	Oct 2019	Linz Open, Austria	International	Hard (i)	(Latvia) Jeļena Ostapenko	6–3, 1–6, 6–2
Win	2–0	May 2021	Emilia-Romagna Open, Italy	WTA 250	Clay	(China) Wang Qiang	6–1, 6–3
Loss	2–1	Jun 2022	French Open, France	Grand Slam	Clay	(Poland) Iga Świątek	1–6, 3–6
Win	3–1	Jan 2023	Auckland Open, New Zealand	WTA 250	Hard	(Spain) Rebeka Masarova	6–1, 6–1
Win	4–1	Aug 2023	Washington Open, United States	WTA 500	Hard	(Greece) Maria Sakkari	6–2, 6–3
Win	5–1	Aug 2023	Cincinnati Open, United States	WTA 1000	Hard	(Czech Republic) Karolína Muchová	6–3, 6–4
Win	6–1	Sep 2023	US Open, United States	Grand Slam	Hard	Aryna Sabalenka	2–6, 6–3, 6–2
Win	7–1	Jan 2024	Auckland Open, New Zealand (2)	WTA 250	Hard	(Ukraine) Elina Svitolina	6–7^{(4–7)}, 6–3, 6–3
Win	8–1	Oct 2024	China Open, China	WTA 1000	Hard	(Czech Republic) Karolina Muchová	6–1, 6–3
Win	9–1	Nov 2024	WTA Finals, Saudi Arabia	Finals	Hard (i)	(China) Zheng Qinwen	3–6, 6–4, 7–6^{(7–2)}
Loss	9–2	May 2025	Madrid Open, Spain	WTA 1000	Clay	Aryna Sabalenka	3–6, 6–7^{(3–7)}
Loss	9–3	May 2025	Italian Open, Italy	WTA 1000	Clay	(Italy) Jasmine Paolini	4–6, 2–6
Win	10–3	Jun 2025	French Open, France	Grand Slam	Clay	Aryna Sabalenka	6–7^{(5–7)}, 6–2, 6–4
Win	11–3	Oct 2025	Wuhan Open, China	WTA 1000	Hard	(United States) Jessica Pegula	6–4, 7–5
Loss	11–4	Mar 2026	Miami Open, United States	WTA 1000	Hard	Aryna Sabalenka	2–6, 6–4, 3–6
Loss	11–5	May 2026	Italian Open, Italy	WTA 1000	Clay	(Ukraine) Elina Svitolina	4–6, 7–6^{(7–3)}, 2–6
Win	12–5	Aug 2026	Cincinnati Open, United States (2)	WTA 1000	Hard	(United States) Jessica Pegula	6–2, 6–4

=== Doubles: 16 (10 titles, 6 runner-ups) ===
Legend Grand Slam (1–2) WTA 1000 (4–3) WTA 500 (2–1) International / WTA 250 (3–0)	Finals by surface Hard (9–1) Clay (2–5)	Finals by setting Outdoor (9–5) Indoor (1–1)

Result	W–L	Date	Tournament	Tier	Surface	Partner	Opponents	Score
Win	1–0	Aug 2019	Washington Open, US	International	Hard	(United States) Caty McNally	(United States) Maria Sanchez (Hungary) Fanny Stollár	6–2, 6–2
Win	2–0	Oct 2019	Luxembourg Open, Luxembourg	International	Hard (i)	(United States) Caty McNally	(United States) Kaitlyn Christian (Chile) Alexa Guarachi	6–2, 6–2
Win	3–0	May 2021	Emilia-Romagna Open, Italy	WTA 250	Clay	(United States) Caty McNally	(Croatia) Darija Jurak (Slovenia) Andreja Klepač	6–3, 6–2
Loss	3–1	Sep 2021	US Open, US	Grand Slam	Hard	(United States) Caty McNally	(Australia) Samantha Stosur (China) Zhang Shuai	3–6, 6–3, 3–6
Win	4–1	Feb 2022	Qatar Open, Qatar	WTA 1000	Hard	(United States) Jessica Pegula	(Russia) Veronika Kudermetova (Belgium) Elise Mertens	3–6, 7–5, [10–5]
Loss	4–2	Apr 2022	Stuttgart Open, Germany	WTA 500	Clay (i)	(China) Zhang Shuai	(United States) Desirae Krawczyk (Netherlands) Demi Schuurs	3–6, 4–6
Loss	4–3	Jun 2022	French Open, France	Grand Slam	Clay	(United States) Jessica Pegula	(France) Caroline Garcia (France) Kristina Mladenovic	6–2, 3–6, 2–6
Win	5–3	Aug 2022	Canadian Open, Canada	WTA 1000	Hard	(United States) Jessica Pegula	(United States) Nicole Melichar-Martinez (Australia) Ellen Perez	6–4, 6–7^{(5–7)}, [10–5]
Win	6–3	Oct 2022	Southern California Open, US	WTA 500	Hard	(United States) Jessica Pegula	(Canada) Gabriela Dabrowski (Mexico) Giuliana Olmos	1–6, 7–5, [10–4]
Win	7–3	Feb 2023	Qatar Ladies Open, Qatar (2)	WTA 500	Hard	(United States) Jessica Pegula	(Ukraine) Lyudmyla Kichenok (Latvia) Jeļena Ostapenko	6–4, 2–6, [10–7]
Win	8–3	Mar 2023	Miami Open, US	WTA 1000	Hard	(United States) Jessica Pegula	(Canada) Leylah Fernandez (United States) Taylor Townsend	7–6^{(8–6)}, 6–2
Loss	8–4	May 2023	Madrid Open, Spain	WTA 1000	Clay	(United States) Jessica Pegula	Victoria Azarenka (Brazil) Beatriz Haddad Maia	1–6, 4–6
Loss	8–5	May 2023	Italian Open, Italy	WTA 1000	Clay	(United States) Jessica Pegula	(Australia) Storm Hunter (Belgium) Elise Mertens	4–6, 4–6
Loss	8–6	May 2024	Italian Open, Italy	WTA 1000	Clay	(New Zealand) Erin Routliffe	(Italy) Sara Errani (Italy) Jasmine Paolini	3–6, 6–4, [8–10]
Win	9–6	Jun 2024	French Open, France	Grand Slam	Clay	(Czech Republic) Kateřina Siniaková	(Italy) Sara Errani (Italy) Jasmine Paolini	7–6^{(7–5)}, 6–3
Win	10–6	Aug 2025	Canadian Open, Canada (2)	WTA 1000	Hard	(United States) McCartney Kessler	(United States) Taylor Townsend (China) Zhang Shuai	6–4, 1–6, [13–11]

== Billie Jean King Cup participation ==
Gauff made her debut at the Billie Jean King Cup playing for United States in 2022. Since then, she has a singles record of 1–1, and a doubles record of 2–0.

=== Singles: 2 (1 win, 1 loss) ===
Edition	Stage	Date	Location	Surface	Against	Opponent	W/L	Score
2022	F RR	Nov 2022	Glasgow, United-Kingdom	Hard (i)	Czech Republic	Kateřina Siniaková	L	6–7^{(1–7)}, 1–6
2023	F QR	Apr 2023	Delray Beach, United States	Hard	Austria	Julia Grabher	W	6–1, 6–3

=== Doubles: 2 (2 wins) ===
Edition	Stage	Date	Location	Surface	Partner	Against	Opponents	W/L	Score
2022	F RR	Nov 2022	Glasgow, United-Kingdom	Hard (i)	Caty McNally	Poland	Magda Linette; Alicja Rosolska	W	6–1, 6–2
2023	F QR	Apr 2023	Delray Beach, United States	Hard	Caty McNally	Austria	Melanie Klaffner; Sinja Kraus	W	6–1, 6–4

== ITF Circuit finals ==
=== Singles: 1 (1 runner-up) ===
Legend W25 tournaments (0–1)	Finals by surface Hard (0–1)

Result	Date	Tournament	Tier	Surface	Opponent	Score
Loss	Feb 2019	ITF Surprise, United States	W25	Hard	(Bulgaria) Sesil Karatantcheva	7–5, 3–6, 1–6

=== Doubles: 2 (1 title, 1 runner-up) ===
Legend W100 tournaments (0–1) W25 tournaments (1–0)	Finals by surface Hard (1–1)

Result	W–L	Date	Tournament	Tier	Surface	Partner	Opponents	Score
Loss	0–1	Feb 2019	ITF Midland, United States	W100	Hard (i)	(United States) Ann Li	(Belarus) Olga Govortsova (Russia) Valeria Savinykh	4–6, 0–6
Win	1–1	Feb 2019	ITF Surprise, United States	W25	Hard	(New Zealand) Paige Hourigan	(United States) Usue Maitane Arconada (United States) Emina Bektas	6–3, 4–6, [14–12]

== ITF Junior finals ==
=== Grand Slam tournaments ===
==== Singles: 2 (1 title, 1 runner-up) ====
Result	Year	Tournament	Surface	Opponent	Score
Loss	2017	US Open	Hard	(United States) Amanda Anisimova	0–6, 2–6
Win	2018	French Open	Clay	(United States) Caty McNally	1–6, 6–3, 7–6^{(7–1)}

==== Doubles: 1 (1 title) ====
Result	Year	Tournament	Surface	Partner	Opponents	Score
Win	2018	US Open	Hard	(United States) Caty McNally	(United States) Hailey Baptiste (United States) Dalayna Hewitt	6–3, 6–2

=== Junior Circuit finals ===
==== Singles: 5 (3 titles, 2 runner–ups) ====
Legend Grade A (2–1) Grade 1 (1–1)

Result	W–L	Date	Tournament	Tier	Surface	Opponent	Score
Loss	0–1	Aug 2017	ITF College Park, United States	Grade 1	Hard	(Australia) Jaimee Fourlis	4–6, 4–6
Loss	0–2	Sep 2017	US Open, United States	Grade A	Hard	(United States) Amanda Anisimova	0–6, 2–6
Win	1–2	Jul 2018	French Open, France	Grade A	Clay	(United States) Caty McNally	1–6, 6–3, 7–6^{(7–1)}
Win	2–2	Jul 2018	ITF Roehampton, United Kingdom	Grade 1	Grass	(United States) Caty McNally	6–2, 6–3
Win	3–2	Dec 2018	ITF Plantation, United States	Grade A	Clay	(China) Zheng Qinwen	6–1, 3–6, 6–4

==== Doubles: 2 (2 titles) ====
Legend Grade A (2–0)

Result	W–L	Date	Tournament	Tier	Surface	Partner	Opponents	Score
Win	1–0	Sep 2018	US Open, United States	Grade A	Hard	(United States) Caty McNally	(United States) Hailey Baptiste (United States) Dalayna Hewitt	6–3, 6–2
Win	2–0	Nov 2018	ITF Mexico City, Mexico	Grade A	Clay	(United States) Hurricane Tyra Black	(France) Giulia Morlet (Hungary) Adrienn Nagy	7–6^{(7–5)}, 4–6, [10–7]

== WTA Tour career earnings ==
Current as of 26 May 2025

Year	Titles			Earnings ($)	Rank
Year	Grand Slam	WTA	Total	Earnings ($)	Rank
2018	–	–	–	13,910	496
2019	–	3	3	538,103	79
2020	–	–	–	509,862	40
2021	–	2	2	1,436,264	18
2022	–	3	3	2,810,133	5
2023	1	5	6	6,669,622	3
2024	1	3	4	9,353,847	2
2025	1	2	3	7,969,845	3
2026	–	1	1	TBD	TBD
Career	3	19	22	29,759,121	11

== Career Grand Slam statistics ==
=== Best Grand Slam tournament results details ===
Grand Slam winners are in boldface, and runner–ups are in italics.

==== Singles ====
**Australian Open**
**2024 (4th)**
Round	Opponent	Rank	Score
1R	(Slovakia) Anna Karolína Schmiedlová	68	6–3, 6–0
2R	(United States) Caroline Dolehide	43	7–6^{(7–2)}, 6–2
3R	(United States) Alycia Parks	82	6–0, 6–2
4R	(Poland) Magdalena Fręch	69	6–1, 6–2
QF	(Ukraine) Marta Kostyuk	37	7–6^{(8–6)}, 6–7^{(3–7)}, 6–2
SF	**Aryna Sabalenka (2)**	2	6–7^{(2–7)}, 4–6

**Wimbledon**
**2026 (7th)**
Round	Opponent	Rank	Score
1R	(Germany) Tamara Korpatsch	78	6–2, 6–1
2R	(Argentina) Solana Sierra	56	6–3, 3–6, 7–6^{(10–7)}
3R	(United States) Claire Liu	146	6–3, 6–7^{(5–7)}, 6–2
4R	(Switzerland) Belinda Bencic (11)	11	4–6, 6–3, 6–4
QF	(United States) Jessica Pegula (4)	4	4–6, 6–3, 6–3
SF	(Czech Republic) Karolína Muchová (10)	9	2–6, 6–1, 6–7^{(10–12)}

**French Open**
**2025 (2nd)**
Round	Opponent	Rank	Score
1R	(Australia) Olivia Gadecki	91	6–2, 6–2
2R	(Czech Republic) Tereza Valentová (Q)	172	6–2, 6–4
3R	(Czech Republic) Marie Bouzková	47	6–1, 7–6^{(7–3)}
4R	Ekaterina Alexandrova (20)	20	6–0, 7–5
QF	(United States) Madison Keys (7)	8	6–7^{(6–8)}, 6–4, 6–1
SF	(France) Loïs Boisson (WC)	361	6–1, 6–2
**W**	Aryna Sabalenka (1)	**1**	6–7^{(5–7)}, 6–2, 6–4

**US Open**
**2023 (6th)**
Round	Opponent	Rank	Score
1R	(Germany) Laura Siegemund (Q)	121	3–6, 6–2, 6–4
2R	Mirra Andreeva	63	6–3, 6–2
3R	(Belgium) Elise Mertens (32)	32	3–6, 6–3, 6–0
4R	(Denmark) Caroline Wozniacki (WC)	623	6–3, 3–6, 6–1
QF	(Latvia) Jeļena Ostapenko (20)	21	6–0, 6–2
SF	(Czech Republic) Karolína Muchová (10)	10	6–4, 7–5
**W**	Aryna Sabalenka (2)	2	2–6, 6–3, 6–2

=== Seedings ===
The tournaments won by Gauff are in boldface, and advanced into finals by Gauff are in italics.

==== Singles ====
Legend seeded No. 2 (**1** / 3) seeded No. 3 (0 / 4) seeded No. 4–10 (**1** / 5) seeded No. 11–32 (0 / 7) unseeded (0 / 4) qualifier (0 / 1) wild card (0 / 1)	Longest streak 2 2 5 7 4 1 1

Year	Australian Open	French Open	Wimbledon	US Open
2018	A	A	A	DNQ
2019	A	DNQ	Q	WC
2020	–	–	cancelled	–
2021	–	24th	20th	21st
2022	18th	18th (1)	11th	12th
2023	7th	6th	7th	**6th (1)**
2024	4th	3rd	2nd	3rd
2025	3rd	**2nd (2)**	2nd	3rd
2026	3rd	4th	7th	4th

- Key: (A) absent; (Q) qualifier; (DNQ) did not qualify; (RT) retired; (NH) Not Held; (–) unseeded; (LL) lucky looser; (PR) protect ranking.

==== Doubles ====
Legend seeded No. 1 (0 / 1) (Note: Gauff was seeded first but withdrew right before the tournament.) seeded No. 2 (0 / 4) seeded No. 3 (0 / 1) seeded No. 4–10 (**1** / 3) seeded No. 11–32 (0 / 4) unseeded (0 / 3) wild card (0 / 2)	Longest streak 1 4 1 2 2 2 (Note: 2020 US Open was played before the 2020 French Open due to schedule change caused by COVID-19 outbreak) 1

Year	Australian Open	French Open	Wimbledon	US Open
2019	A	WC	A	WC
2020	–	16th	cancelled	–
2021	–	–	12th	11th (1)
2022	8th	8th (2)	A	2nd
2023	2nd	2nd	2nd	3rd
2024	~~1st~~	**5th (1)**	11th	A
2025	A	A	A	A
2026	A	A	A	

- Key: (A) absent; (Q) qualifier; (DNQ) did not qualify; (RT) retired; (NH) Not Held; (–) unseeded; (LL) lucky looser; (PR) protect ranking.

== Wins against top 10 players ==
- Gauff has a 40–42 win-loss record against players who were, at the time the match was played, ranked in the top 10.
- Additional top 10 sources

No.	Player	Rk	Event	Surface	Rd	Score	Rk	Years	Ref
1	(Netherlands) Kiki Bertens	8	Linz Open, Austria	Hard (i)	QF	7–6^{(7–1)}, 6–4	110	2019	
2	(Japan) Naomi Osaka	4	Australian Open, Australia	Hard	3R	6–3, 6–4	67	2020	
3	(Belarus) Aryna Sabalenka	4	Italian Open, Italy	Clay	3R	7–5, 6–3	35	2021	
4	(Australia) Ashleigh Barty	1	Italian Open, Italy	Clay	QF	4–6, 1–2 ret.	35	2021	
5	(Spain) Paula Badosa	4	Qatar Open, Qatar	Hard	3R	6–2, 6–3	23	2022	
6	(Czech Republic) Karolína Plíšková	7	German Open, Germany	Grass	QF	7–5, 6–4	13	2022	
7	Aryna Sabalenka	6	Canadian Open, Canada	Hard	3R	7–5, 4–6, 7–6^{(7–4)}	11	2022	
8	(United States) Jessica Pegula	4	Eastbourne International, UK	Grass	QF	6–3, 6–3	7	2023	
9	(Greece) Maria Sakkari	9	Washington Open, United States	Hard	F	6–2, 6–3	7	2023	
10	(Czech Republic) Markéta Vondroušová	10	Canadian Open, Canada	Hard	3R	6–3, 6–0	7	2023	
11	(Poland) Iga Świątek	1	Cincinnati Open, United States	Hard	SF	7–6^{(7–2)}, 3–6, 6–4	7	2023	
12	(Czech Republic) Karolína Muchová	10	US Open, United States	Hard	SF	6–4, 7–5	6	2023	
13	Aryna Sabalenka	2	US Open, United States	Hard	F	2–6, 6–3, 6–2	6	2023	
14	(Greece) Maria Sakkari	6	China Open, China	Hard	QF	6–2, 6–4	3	2023	
15	(Tunisia) Ons Jabeur	7	WTA Finals, Mexico	Hard	RR	6–0, 6–1	3	2023	
16	(Czech Republic) Markéta Vondroušová	6	WTA Finals, Mexico	Hard	RR	5–7, 7–6^{(7–4)}, 6–3	3	2023	
17	(China) Zheng Qinwen	7	Italian Open, Italy	Clay	QF	7–6^{(7–4)}, 6–1	3	2024	
18	(Tunisia) Ons Jabeur	9	French Open, France	Clay	QF	4–6, 6–2, 6–3	3	2024	
19	(Tunisia) Ons Jabeur	10	Berlin Open, Germany	Grass	QF	7–6^{(11–9)}, 0–0 ret.	2	2024	
20	(United States) Jessica Pegula	6	WTA Finals, Saudi Arabia	Hard (i)	RR	6–3, 6–2	3	2024	
21	(Poland) Iga Świątek	2	WTA Finals, Saudi Arabia	Hard (i)	RR	6–3, 6–4	3	2024	
22	Aryna Sabalenka	1	WTA Finals, Saudi Arabia	Hard (i)	SF	7–6^{(7–4)}, 6–3	3	2024	
23	(China) Zheng Qinwen	7	WTA Finals, Saudi Arabia	Hard (i)	F	3–6, 6–4, 7–6^{(7–2)}	3	2024	
24	(Poland) Iga Świątek	2	United Cup, Australia	Hard	F	6–4, 6–4	3	2025	
25	Mirra Andreeva	7	Madrid Open, Spain	Clay	QF	7–5, 6–1	4	2025	
26	(Poland) Iga Świątek	2	Madrid Open, Spain	Clay	SF	6–1, 6–1	4	2025	
27	Mirra Andreeva	7	Italian Open, Italy	Clay	QF	6–4, 7–6^{(7–5)}	3	2025	
28	(China) Zheng Qinwen	8	Italian Open, Italy	Clay	SF	7–6^{(7–3)}, 4–6, 7–6^{(7–4)}	3	2025	
29	(United States) Madison Keys	8	French Open, France	Clay	QF	6–7^{(6–8)}, 6–4, 6–1	2	2025	
30	Aryna Sabalenka	1	French Open, France	Clay	F	6–7^{(5–7)}, 6–2, 6–4	2	2025	
31	(Italy) Jasmine Paolini	8	Wuhan Open, China	Hard	SF	6–4, 6–3	3	2025	
32	(United States) Jessica Pegula	6	Wuhan Open, China	Hard	F	6–4, 7–5	3	2025	
33	(Italy) Jasmine Paolini	8	WTA Finals, Saudi Arabia	Hard (i)	RR	6–3, 6–2	3	2025	
34	(Poland) Iga Świątek	2	United Cup, Australia	Hard	SF	6–4, 6–2	3	2026	
35	Mirra Andreeva	7	Italian Open, Italy	Clay	QF	4–6, 6–2, 6–4	4	2026	
36	(United States) Jessica Pegula	4	Wimbledon, United Kingdom	Grass	QF	4–6, 6–3, 6–3	7	2026	
37	(United States) Jessica Pegula	3	Cincinnati Open, United States	Hard	F	6–2, 6–4	4	2026	
38	Mirra Andreeva	5	US Open, United States	Hard	QF	2–6, 7–6^{(9–7)}, 6–2	4	2026	
39	(United States) Jessica Pegula	5	WTA Finals, Indian Wells	Hard	RR	6–4, 6–7^{(5–7)}, 6–2	4	2026	
40	(Ukraine) Marta Kostyuk	10	WTA Finals, Indian Wells	Hard	RR	6–4, 7–5	4	2026	

- Key: (Rk) first use, opponent rank; (Rd) round; (Rk) 2nd use, player rank; (Ref) reference; (F) final; (SF) semifinal; (QF) quarterfinal; (#R) rounds 4, 3, 2, 1; (RR) round-robin stage; (Q#) qualifying rounds or stages (3), 2, 1.

== Double bagel matches (6–0, 6–0) ==
Result	Year	No.	Tournament	Tier	Surface	Opponent	Rk	Rd	Rk
Win	2024	1.	Madrid Open, Spain	WTA 1000	Clay	(Netherlands) Arantxa Rus	47	2R	3
Win	2025	2.	Miami Open, United States	WTA 1000	Hard	(United States) Sofia Kenin	46	2R	3

== Longest winning streak ==
=== 16-match win streak (2023) ===
#	Tournament	Tier	Start date	Surface	Round	Opponent	Rank	Score
–	Canadian Open	WTA 1000	7 August 2023	Hard	QF	(United States) Jessica Pegula	3	2–6, 7–5, 5–7
1	Cincinnati Open	WTA 1000	14 August 2023	Hard	2R	(Egypt) Mayar Sherif	33	6–2, 6–2
2	Cincinnati Open	WTA 1000	14 August 2023	Hard	3R	(Czech Republic) Linda Nosková (Q)	50	6–4, 6–0
3	Cincinnati Open	WTA 1000	14 August 2023	Hard	QF	(Italy) Jasmine Paolini (Q)	43	6–3, 6–2
4	Cincinnati Open	WTA 1000	14 August 2023	Hard	SF	(Poland) Iga Świątek (1)	1	7–6^{(7–2)}, 3–6, 6–4
5	Cincinnati Open	WTA 1000	14 August 2023	Hard	F	(Czech Republic) Karolína Muchová	17	6–3, 6–4
6	US Open	Grand Slam	28 August 2023	Hard	1R	(Germany) Laura Siegemund (Q)	121	3–6. 6–2, 6–4
7	US Open	Grand Slam	28 August 2023	Hard	2R	Mirra Andreeva	63	6–3, 6–2
8	US Open	Grand Slam	28 August 2023	Hard	3R	(Belgium) Elise Mertens (32)	32	3–6, 6–3, 6–0
9	US Open	Grand Slam	28 August 2023	Hard	4R	(Denmark) Caroline Wozniacki (WC)	623	6–3, 3–6, 6–1
10	US Open	Grand Slam	28 August 2023	Hard	QF	(Latvia) Jeļena Ostapenko (20)	21	6–0, 6–2
11	US Open	Grand Slam	28 August 2023	Hard	SF	(Czech Republic) Karolína Muchová (10)	10	6–4, 7–5
12	US Open	Grand Slam	28 August 2023	Hard	F	Aryna Sabalenka (2)	2	2–6, 6–3, 6–2
13	China Open	WTA 1000	2 October 2023	Hard	1R	Ekaterina Alexandrova	20	7–5, 6–3
14	China Open	WTA 1000	2 October 2023	Hard	2R	(Croatia) Petra Martić	48	7–5, 5–7, 7–6^{(7–2)}
15	China Open	WTA 1000	2 October 2023	Hard	3R	Veronika Kudermetova (16)	16	7–6^{(7–5)}, 6–2
16	China Open	WTA 1000	2 October 2023	Hard	QF	(Greece) Maria Sakkari (6)	6	6–2, 6–4
ended	China Open	WTA 1000	2 October 2023	Hard	SF	(Poland) Iga Świątek (2)	2	2–6, 3–6
