= Arianna Zucchini =

Italian tennis player (born 2003)

- Country (sports): Italy
- Born: 10 July 2003 (age 23) Sant'Agostino, Emilia–Romagna, Italy
- Plays: Right (two-handed backhand)
- Prize money: $71,895

Singles
- Career record: 171–147
- Career titles: 2 ITF
- Highest ranking: No. 496 (6 April 2026)
- Current ranking: No. 623 (31 August 2026)

Doubles
- Career record: 50–62
- Highest ranking: No. 573 (15 June 2026)
- Current ranking: No. 593 (31 August 2026)
- Last updated on: 11 September 2026.

Arianna Zucchini (born 10 July 2003) is an Italian professional tennis player. She has career-high rankings of No. 496 in singles, achieved on 6 April 2026, and No. 573 in doubles, achieved on 15 June 2026.

== Early life ==
Zucchini was born in Sant'Agostino, Emilia–Romagna. She played for TC Sant'Agostino in her hometown.

== Career ==
In June 2022, Zucchini reached the quarterfinals of the W15 event in Heraklion, before losing to Kajsa Rinaldo Persson. In November 2023, she reached the quarterfinals of the W25 Val Gardena Südtirol Raiffeisen in Sëlva, but lost to Kamilla Bartone. She won her first professional title in January 2024 at the W15 Magic Hotel Tours series in Monastir, defeating Korean player Lee Eun-hye in the final.

In March 2025, Zucchini won her second professional title, again in Monastir. That May, after passing the pre-qualifying tournament, she received a wildcard into the singles main draw of the Italian Open. Zucchini lost in the first round to qualifier Victoria Mboko.

== ITF Circuit finals ==
=== Singles: 4 (2 titles, 2 runner-ups) ===
Legend
W35 tournaments (0–1)
W15 tournaments (2–1)

Result	W–L	Date	Tournament	Tier	Surface	Opponent	Score
Loss	0–1	Dec 2022	ITF Monastir, Tunisia	W15	Hard	(Greece) Sapfo Sakellaridi	2–6, 2–6
Win	1–1	Jan 2024	ITF Monastir, Tunisia	W15	Hard	(South Korea) Lee Eun-hye	7–5, 6–3
Win	2–1	Mar 2025	ITF Monastir, Tunisia	W15	Hard	Daria Khomutsianskaya	1–6, 6–4, 6–0
Loss	2–2	Jul 2025	ITF Monastir, Tunisia	W35	Hard	(South Korea) Back Da-yeon	7–6^{(4)}, 2–6, 6–7^{(7)}

=== Doubles: 3 (3 runner-ups) ===
Legend
W35 tournaments (0–2)
W15 tournaments (0–1)

Result	W–L	Date	Tournament	Tier	Surface	Partner	Opponents	Score
Loss	0–1	Aug 2021	ITF Bad Waltersdorf, Austria	W15	Clay	(Italy) Giulia Crescenzi	(South Korea) Ku Yeon-woo (Indonesia) Priska Madelyn Nugroho	4–6, 3–6
Loss	0–2	Sep 2025	ITF Monastir, Tunisia	W35	Hard	(Switzerland) Alina Granwehr	(France) Yasmine Mansouri (Serbia) Elena Milovanović	1–6, 1–6
Loss	0–3	May 2026	ITF Bol, Croatia	W35	Clay	(Italy) Aurora Zantedeschi	(France) Yara Bartashevich (Poland) Weronika Falkowska	4–6, 2–6
