= 2023 Italian Open – Men's doubles =

Men's doubles
- 2023 Italian Open

Final
- Champions: (Monaco) Hugo Nys (Poland) Jan Zieliński
- Runners-up: (Netherlands) Robin Haase (Netherlands) Botic van de Zandschulp
- Score: 7–5, 6–1

Events
Singles	men	women
Doubles	men	women
← 2022 ·	Italian Open	· 2024 →

Hugo Nys and Jan Zieliński defeated Robin Haase and Botic van de Zandschulp in the final, 7–5, 6–1 to win the men's doubles tennis title at the 2023 Italian Open.

Nikola Mektić and Mate Pavić were the two-time defending champions, but lost in the first round to Marcel Granollers and Horacio Zeballos.

Wesley Koolhof and Neal Skupski retained the ATP no. 1 doubles ranking. Rajeev Ram, Austin Krajicek, Marcelo Arévalo, and Jean-Julien Rojer were also in contention for the top ranking at the start of the tournament.

== Seeds ==
1. (Netherlands) Wesley Koolhof / (United Kingdom) Neal Skupski (semifinals)
2. (United States) Rajeev Ram / (United Kingdom) Joe Salisbury (quarterfinals)
3. (Croatia) Ivan Dodig / (United States) Austin Krajicek (second round)
4. (El Salvador) Marcelo Arévalo / (Netherlands) Jean-Julien Rojer (first round)
5. (Croatia) Nikola Mektić / (Croatia) Mate Pavić (first round)
6. (United Kingdom) Lloyd Glasspool / (Finland) Harri Heliövaara (second round)
7. (India) Rohan Bopanna / (Australia) Matthew Ebden (second round)
8. (Mexico) Santiago González / (France) Édouard Roger-Vasselin (first round)

== Draw ==
=== Key ===
- Q = Qualifier
- WC = Wild card
- LL = Lucky loser
- Alt = Alternate
- SE = Special exempt
- PR = Protected ranking
- ITF = ITF entry
- JE = Junior exempt
- w/o = Walkover
- r = Retired
- d = Defaulted
- SR = Special ranking

=== Finals ===
Semifinals
1	(Netherlands) Wesley Koolhof (United Kingdom) Neal Skupski	6^{2}	4
(Netherlands) Robin Haase (Netherlands) Botic van de Zandschulp	7^{7}	6
(Monaco) Hugo Nys (Poland) Jan Zieliński	6	7
(Spain) Marcel Granollers (Argentina) Horacio Zeballos	3	5

Final
(Netherlands) Robin Haase (Netherlands) Botic van de Zandschulp	5	1
(Monaco) Hugo Nys (Poland) Jan Zieliński	7	6

=== Top half ===
First round
1	(Netherlands) W Koolhof (United Kingdom) N Skupski	6^{3}	6	[10]
(Netherlands) M Middelkoop (Germany) A Mies	7^{7}	3	[4]
(Italy) S Bolelli (Italy) F Fognini	7^{7}	4	[11]
(Austria) A Erler (Austria) L Miedler	6^{4}	6	[9]
(Argentina) S Báez (Spain) B Zapata Miralles	3	5
(Australia) A de Minaur (Australia) J Kubler	6	7
WC	(Italy) F Arnaboldi (Italy) G Ferrari	3	6^{6}
7	(India) R Bopanna (Australia) M Ebden	6	7^{8}
4	(El Salvador) M Arévalo (Netherlands) J-J Rojer	6^{7}	6	[2]
(United Kingdom) J Murray (New Zealand) M Venus	7^{9}	4	[10]
(Colombia) JS Cabal (Colombia) R Farah	6	5	[7]
K Khachanov; A Rublev	4	7	[10]
(Germany) K Krawietz (Germany) T Pütz	3	6	[10]
(Brazil) M Melo (Germany) A Zverev	6	3	[6]
(Netherlands) R Haase (Netherlands) B van de Zandschulp	6	7^{7}
8	(Mexico) S González (France) É Roger-Vasselin	3	6^{4}

Second round
1	(Netherlands) W Koolhof (United Kingdom) N Skupski	6	7^{7}
(Italy) S Bolelli (Italy) F Fognini	4	6^{5}
(Australia) A de Minaur (Australia) J Kubler	2	7^{10}	[12]
7	(India) R Bopanna (Australia) M Ebden	6	6^{8}	[10]
(United Kingdom) J Murray (New Zealand) M Venus	w/o
K Khachanov; A Rublev
(Germany) K Krawietz (Germany) T Pütz
(Netherlands) R Haase (Netherlands) B van de Zandschulp	w/o

Quarterfinals
1	(Netherlands) W Koolhof (United Kingdom) N Skupski	6	6
(Australia) A de Minaur (Australia) J Kubler	4	4
(United Kingdom) J Murray (New Zealand) M Venus	6	6^{3}	[6]
(Netherlands) R Haase (Netherlands) B van de Zandschulp	3	7^{7}	[10]

Semifinals
1	(Netherlands) W Koolhof (United Kingdom) N Skupski	6^{2}	4
(Netherlands) R Haase (Netherlands) B van de Zandschulp	7^{7}	6

=== Bottom half ===
First round
6	(United Kingdom) L Glasspool (Finland) H Heliövaara	7^{7}	2	[10]
(United States) N Lammons (Australia) J Peers	6^{2}	6	[6]
(United States) T Fritz (United States) T Paul	6^{3}	7^{7}	[8]
(United States) M McDonald (United States) F Tiafoe	7^{7}	6^{4}	[10]
(Monaco) H Nys (Poland) J Zieliński	6	6
(United States) M Cressy (Spain) D Vega Hernández	3	3
(France) N Mahut (France) F Martin	7	2	[6]
3	(Croatia) I Dodig (United States) A Krajicek	5	6	[10]
5	(Croatia) N Mektić (Croatia) M Pavić	6^{6}	6	[8]
(Spain) M Granollers (Argentina) H Zeballos	7^{8}	3	[10]
(United Kingdom) D Evans (United States) B Shelton	6	6
WC	(Italy) L Musetti (Italy) G Zeppieri	4	2
WC	(Italy) A Pellegrino (Italy) A Vavassori	6	3	[10]
(Spain) A Davidovich Fokina (Poland) H Hurkacz	4	6	[6]
(Argentina) M González (Argentina) A Molteni	3	2
2	(United States) R Ram (United Kingdom) J Salisbury	6	6

Second round
6	(United Kingdom) L Glasspool (Finland) H Heliövaara	6	2	[9]
(United States) M McDonald (United States) F Tiafoe	4	6	[11]
(Monaco) H Nys (Poland) J Zieliński	7^{7}	6
3	(Croatia) I Dodig (United States) A Krajicek	6^{3}	2
(Spain) M Granollers (Argentina) H Zeballos	6	7^{7}
(United Kingdom) D Evans (United States) B Shelton	1	6^{1}
WC	(Italy) A Pellegrino (Italy) A Vavassori	6^{1}	7^{7}	[7]
2	(United States) R Ram (United Kingdom) J Salisbury	7^{7}	6^{1}	[10]

Quarterfinals
(United States) M McDonald (United States) F Tiafoe	5	6^{2}
(Monaco) H Nys (Poland) J Zieliński	7	7^{7}
(Spain) M Granollers (Argentina) H Zeballos	6	5	[10]
2	(United States) R Ram (United Kingdom) J Salisbury	4	7	[6]

Semifinals
(Monaco) H Nys (Poland) J Zieliński	6	7
(Spain) M Granollers (Argentina) H Zeballos	3	5

== Seeded teams ==
The following are the seeded teams. Seedings are based on ATP rankings as of 8 May 2023.

Country	Player	Country	Player	Rank	Seed
NED	Wesley Koolhof	GBR	Neal Skupski	2	1
USA	Rajeev Ram	GBR	Joe Salisbury	9	2
CRO	Ivan Dodig	USA	Austin Krajicek	9	3
ESA	Marcelo Arévalo	NED	Jean-Julien Rojer	14	4
CRO	Nikola Mektić	CRO	Mate Pavić	19	5
GBR	Lloyd Glasspool	FIN	Harri Heliövaara	24	6
IND	Rohan Bopanna	AUS	Matthew Ebden	26	7
MEX	Santiago González	FRA	Édouard Roger-Vasselin	30	8

== Other entry information ==
=== Wildcards ===
- (Italy) Federico Arnaboldi / (Italy) Gianmarco Ferrari
- (Italy) Lorenzo Musetti / (Italy) Giulio Zeppieri
- (Italy) Andrea Pellegrino / (Italy) Andrea Vavassori

=== Withdrawals ===
- (Netherlands) Tallon Griekspoor / (Netherlands) Botic van de Zandschulp → replaced by (Netherlands) Robin Haase / (Netherlands) Botic van de Zandschulp
- (United States) Nathaniel Lammons / (United States) Jackson Withrow → replaced by (United States) Nathaniel Lammons / (Australia) John Peers
- (Brazil) Rafael Matos / (Spain) David Vega Hernández → replaced by (United States) Maxime Cressy / (Spain) David Vega Hernández
