= 2024 Italian Open – Men's doubles =

Men's doubles
- 2024 Italian Open

Final
- Champions: (Spain) Marcel Granollers (Argentina) Horacio Zeballos
- Runners-up: (El Salvador) Marcelo Arévalo (Croatia) Mate Pavić
- Score: 6–2, 6–2

Events
Singles	men	women
Doubles	men	women
← 2023 ·	Italian Open	· 2025 →

Marcel Granollers and Horacio Zeballos won the men's doubles title at the 2024 Italian Open, defeating Marcelo Arévalo and Mate Pavić in the final, 6–2, 6–2. It was the eighth ATP Masters 1000 doubles title for Granollers, and seventh for Zeballos. They did not drop a set on their way to their second Rome title as a pair, having won their first in 2020.

Granollers and Zeballos retained the ATP No. 1 doubles ranking after reaching the semifinals. Matthew Ebden and Joe Salisbury were also in contention for the top ranking at the beginning of the tournament.

Hugo Nys and Jan Zieliński were the defending champions, but lost in the second round to Sander Gillé and Joran Vliegen.

== Seeds ==
1. (Spain) Marcel Granollers / (Argentina) Horacio Zeballos (champions)
2. (India) Rohan Bopanna / (Australia) Matthew Ebden (second round)
3. (United States) Rajeev Ram / (United Kingdom) Joe Salisbury (quarterfinals)
4. (United States) Austin Krajicek / (United Kingdom) Neal Skupski (first round)
5. (Mexico) Santiago González / (France) Édouard Roger-Vasselin (second round)
6. (Germany) Kevin Krawietz / (Germany) Tim Pütz (second round)
7. (Netherlands) Wesley Koolhof / (Croatia) Nikola Mektić (quarterfinals)
8. (Monaco) Hugo Nys / (Poland) Jan Zieliński (second round)

== Draw ==
=== Key ===
- Q = Qualifier
- WC = Wild card
- LL = Lucky loser
- Alt = Alternate
- ITF = ITF entry
- PR = Protected ranking
- SR = Special ranking
- SE = Special exempt
- JE = Junior exempt
- JR = Junior Accelerator Programme entrant
- CO = College Accelerator Programme entrant
- NG = Next Gen Accelerator Program entrant
- w/o = Walkover
- r = Retired
- d = Defaulted

=== Finals ===
Semifinals
1	(Spain) Marcel Granollers (Argentina) Horacio Zeballos	6	6
(Kazakhstan) Alexander Bublik (United States) Ben Shelton	4	4
(El Salvador) Marcelo Arévalo (Croatia) Mate Pavić	6	7^{7}
(Italy) Simone Bolelli (Italy) Andrea Vavassori	2	6^{5}

Final
1	(Spain) Marcel Granollers (Argentina) Horacio Zeballos	6	6
(El Salvador) Marcelo Arévalo (Croatia) Mate Pavić	2	2

=== Top half ===
First round
1	(Spain) M Granollers (Argentina) H Zeballos	6	7^{7}
Alt	(Finland) H Heliövaara (United Kingdom) H Patten	1	6^{3}
(Brazil) R Matos (Argentina) A Molteni	6	6
(France) A Mannarino (Spain) P Martínez	3	0
WC	(Italy) J Bilardo (Italy) G Ricca	4	2
(Belgium) S Gillé (Belgium) J Vliegen	6	6
(Uruguay) A Behar (Czech Republic) A Pavlásek	3	6	[7]
8	(Monaco) H Nys (Poland) J Zieliński	6	3	[10]
4	(United States) A Krajicek (United Kingdom) N Skupski	6^{0}	7^{7}	[9]
(Brazil) M Melo (Germany) A Zverev	7^{7}	6^{5}	[11]
(Canada) F Auger-Aliassime (United States) F Tiafoe	1	7^{8}	[7]
(Kazakhstan) A Bublik (United States) B Shelton	6	6^{6}	[10]
(United States) T Fritz (United States) T Paul	6	1	[8]
(Argentina) F Cerúndolo (Argentina) TM Etcheverry	4	6	[10]
(Australia) A de Minaur (Australia) A Popyrin	7	3	[1]
6	(Germany) K Krawietz (Germany) T Pütz	5	6	[10]

Second round
1	(Spain) M Granollers (Argentina) H Zeballos	6	6
(Brazil) R Matos (Argentina) A Molteni	4	2
(Belgium) S Gillé (Belgium) J Vliegen	5	6	[10]
8	(Monaco) H Nys (Poland) J Zieliński	7	3	[8]
(Brazil) M Melo (Germany) A Zverev	6	3	[7]
(Kazakhstan) A Bublik (United States) B Shelton	2	6	[10]
(Argentina) F Cerúndolo (Argentina) TM Etcheverry	6^{6}	7	[10]
6	(Germany) K Krawietz (Germany) T Pütz	7^{8}	5	[7]

Quarterfinals
1	(Spain) M Granollers (Argentina) H Zeballos	6	7^{7}
(Belgium) S Gillé (Belgium) J Vliegen	2	6^{4}
(Kazakhstan) A Bublik (United States) B Shelton	1	6	[10]
(Argentina) F Cerúndolo (Argentina) TM Etcheverry	6	4	[5]

Semifinals
1	(Spain) M Granollers (Argentina) H Zeballos	6	6
(Kazakhstan) A Bublik (United States) B Shelton	4	4

=== Bottom half ===
First round
5	(Mexico) S González (France) É Roger-Vasselin	6	7^{7}
(United States) N Lammons (United States) J Withrow	4	6^{1}
(El Salvador) M Arévalo (Croatia) M Pavić	6	6
Alt	(Colombia) C Rodríguez (Australia) J-P Smith	4	2
(United Kingdom) L Glasspool (Netherlands) J-J Rojer	4	3
(United Kingdom) J Murray (New Zealand) M Venus	6	6
(United States) S Korda (Australia) J Thompson	6	2	[8]
3	(United States) R Ram (United Kingdom) J Salisbury	4	6	[10]
7	(Netherlands) W Koolhof (Croatia) N Mektić	5	6	[11]
(Netherlands) R Haase (Greece) S Tsitsipas	7	2	[9]
Alt	(Argentina) S Báez (Brazil) T Seyboth Wild	6	7
(Netherlands) T Griekspoor (Poland) H Hurkacz	3	5
Alt	(United States) C Eubanks (Australia) J Peers	6^{4}	3
(Italy) S Bolelli (Italy) A Vavassori	7^{7}	6
WC	(Italy) M Arnaldi (Italy) F Passaro	2	2
2	(India) R Bopanna (Australia) M Ebden	6	6

Second round
5	(Mexico) S González (France) É Roger-Vasselin	1	2
(El Salvador) M Arévalo (Croatia) M Pavić	6	6
(United Kingdom) J Murray (New Zealand) M Venus	5	2
3	(United States) R Ram (United Kingdom) J Salisbury	7	6
7	(Netherlands) W Koolhof (Croatia) N Mektić	6	6
Alt	(Argentina) S Báez (Brazil) T Seyboth Wild	4	2
(Italy) S Bolelli (Italy) A Vavassori	6	6
2	(India) R Bopanna (Australia) M Ebden	2	4

Quarterfinals
(El Salvador) M Arévalo (Croatia) M Pavić	6	6
3	(United States) R Ram (United Kingdom) J Salisbury	4	4
7	(Netherlands) W Koolhof (Croatia) N Mektić	4	2
(Italy) S Bolelli (Italy) A Vavassori	6	6

Semifinals
(El Salvador) M Arévalo (Croatia) M Pavić	6	7^{7}
(Italy) S Bolelli (Italy) A Vavassori	2	6^{5}

== Seeded teams ==
The following are the projected seeded teams, based on live ATP rankings as of 2 May 2024. Actual seedings will be based on ATP rankings as of 6 May 2024.

Country	Player	Country	Player	Rank	Seed
ESP	Marcel Granollers	ARG	Horacio Zeballos	2	1
IND	Rohan Bopanna	AUS	Matthew Ebden	7	2
USA	Rajeev Ram	GBR	Joe Salisbury	11	3
USA	Austin Krajicek	GBR	Neal Skupski	19	4
MEX	Santiago González	FRA	Édouard Roger-Vasselin	23	5
GER	Kevin Krawietz	GER	Tim Pütz	26	6
NED	Wesley Koolhof	CRO	Nikola Mektić	32	7
MON	Hugo Nys	POL	Jan Zieliński	33	8

== Other entry information ==
=== Wildcards ===
- (Italy) Matteo Arnaldi / (Italy) Francesco Passaro
- (Italy) Jacopo Bilardo / (Italy) Giorgio Ricca
- ~~(Italy) Flavio Cobolli / (Italy) Lorenzo Musetti~~

=== Alternates ===
- (Argentina) Sebastián Báez / (Brazil) Thiago Seyboth Wild
- (United States) Christopher Eubanks / (Australia) John Peers
- (Finland) Harri Heliövaara / (United Kingdom) Henry Patten
- (Colombia) Cristian Rodríguez / (Australia) John-Patrick Smith

=== Withdrawals ===
- (Italy) Flavio Cobolli / (Italy) Lorenzo Musetti → replaced by (United States) Christopher Eubanks / (Australia) John Peers
- (Spain) Alejandro Davidovich Fokina / (France) Arthur Fils → replaced by (Finland) Harri Heliövaara / (United Kingdom) Henry Patten
- (France) Sadio Doumbia / (France) Fabien Reboul → replaced by (Colombia) Cristian Rodríguez / (Australia) John-Patrick Smith
- (Argentina) Máximo González / (Argentina) Andrés Molteni → replaced by (Brazil) Rafael Matos / (Argentina) Andrés Molteni
- Daniil Medvedev / Roman Safiullin → replaced by (Argentina) Sebastián Báez / (Brazil) Thiago Seyboth Wild
