= 2025 Italian Open – Men's doubles =

Men's doubles
- 2025 Italian Open

Final
- Champions: (El Salvador) Marcelo Arévalo (Croatia) Mate Pavić
- Runners-up: (France) Sadio Doumbia (France) Fabien Reboul
- Score: 6–4, 6–7^{(6–8)}, [13–11]

Details
- Draw: 32
- Seeds: 8

Events
Singles	men	women
Doubles	men	women
← 2024 ·	Italian Open	· 2026 →

Marcelo Arévalo and Mate Pavić defeated Sadio Doumbia and Fabien Reboul in the final, 6–4, 6–7^{(6–8)}, [13–11] to win the men's doubles tennis title at the 2025 Italian Open. They saved a championship point en route to the title.

Marcel Granollers and Horacio Zeballos were the defending champions, but lost in the quarterfinals to Joe Salisbury and Neal Skupski.

== Seeds ==
1. (El Salvador) Marcelo Arévalo / (Croatia) Mate Pavić (champions)
2. (Finland) Harri Heliövaara / (United Kingdom) Henry Patten (semifinals)
3. (Germany) Kevin Krawietz / (Germany) Tim Pütz (quarterfinals)
4. (Spain) Marcel Granollers / (Argentina) Horacio Zeballos (quarterfinals)
5. (Italy) Simone Bolelli / (Italy) Andrea Vavassori (first round)
6. (Croatia) Nikola Mektić / (New Zealand) Michael Venus (first round)
7. (United States) Christian Harrison / (United States) Evan King (quarterfinals)
8. (Argentina) Máximo González / (Argentina) Andrés Molteni (withdrew)

== Draw ==
=== Key ===
- Q = Qualifier
- WC = Wild card
- LL = Lucky loser
- Alt = Alternate
- ITF = ITF entry
- PR = Protected ranking
- SR = Special ranking
- SE = Special exempt
- JE = Junior exempt
- JR = Junior Accelerator Programme entrant
- CO = College Accelerator Programme entrant
- NG = Next Gen Accelerator Program entrant
- w/o = Walkover
- r = Retired
- d = Defaulted

=== Finals ===
Semifinals
1	(El Salvador) Marcelo Arévalo (Croatia) Mate Pavić	7^{7}	6
(United Kingdom) Joe Salisbury (United Kingdom) Neal Skupski	6^{2}	1
(France) Sadio Doumbia (France) Fabien Reboul	7^{7}	6
2	(Finland) Harri Heliövaara (United Kingdom) Henry Patten	6^{5}	4

Final
1	(El Salvador) Marcelo Arévalo (Croatia) Mate Pavić	6	6^{6}	[13]
(France) Sadio Doumbia (France) Fabien Reboul	4	7^{8}	[11]

=== Top half ===
First round
1	(El Salvador) M Arévalo (Croatia) M Pavić	6	6
(United Kingdom) J Cash (Austria) L Miedler	1	4
Alt	(Monaco) R Arneodo (France) M Guinard	1	4
(Belgium) S Gillé (Poland) J Zieliński	6	6
(Sweden) A Göransson (Netherlands) S Verbeek	6	6
Alt	(United States) A Michelsen (United States) L Tien	2	4
WC	(Italy) M Bellucci (Italy) F Romano	3	6	[3]
7	(United States) C Harrison (United States) E King	6	4	[10]
4	(Spain) M Granollers (Argentina) H Zeballos	6	6
(India) Y Bhambri (United States) R Galloway	1	2
(Brazil) R Matos (Brazil) M Melo	2	3
Alt	(Netherlands) S Arends (United Kingdom) L Johnson	6	6
(United Kingdom) J Salisbury (United Kingdom) N Skupski	6	7
(United States) N Lammons (United States) J Withrow	2	5
(India) R Bopanna (Czech Republic) A Pavlásek	4	7^{7}	[10]
6	(Croatia) N Mektić (New Zealand) M Venus	6	6^{5}	[4]

Second round
1	(El Salvador) M Arévalo (Croatia) M Pavić	7	4	[10]
(Belgium) S Gillé (Poland) J Zieliński	5	6	[2]
(Sweden) A Göransson (Netherlands) S Verbeek	3	2
7	(United States) C Harrison (United States) E King	6	6
4	(Spain) M Granollers (Argentina) H Zeballos	6	3	[10]
Alt	(Netherlands) S Arends (United Kingdom) L Johnson	4	6	[4]
(United Kingdom) J Salisbury (United Kingdom) N Skupski	6	6
(India) R Bopanna (Czech Republic) A Pavlásek	3	3

Quarterfinals
1	(El Salvador) M Arévalo (Croatia) M Pavić	7	6
7	(United States) C Harrison (United States) E King	5	4
4	(Spain) M Granollers (Argentina) H Zeballos	3	2
(United Kingdom) J Salisbury (United Kingdom) N Skupski	6	6

Semifinals
1	(El Salvador) M Arévalo (Croatia) M Pavić	7^{7}	6
(United Kingdom) J Salisbury (United Kingdom) N Skupski	6^{2}	1

=== Bottom half ===
First round
5	(Italy) S Bolelli (Italy) A Vavassori	6^{5}	7^{12}	[8]
WC	(Italy) F Bondioli (Italy) CA Caniato	7^{7}	6^{10}	[10]
(France) S Doumbia (France) F Reboul	6	5	[10]
(Argentina) F Cerúndolo (Argentina) C Ugo Carabelli	3	7	[6]
(Australia) M Ebden (Australia) J Peers	3	6	[10]
(Uruguay) A Behar (Monaco) H Nys	6	3	[4]
(Argentina) S Báez (France) A Müller	1	2
3	(Germany) K Krawietz (Germany) T Pütz	6	6
Alt	(United States) M Giron (Brazil) F Romboli	3	5
(Italy) M Arnaldi (Australia) A Popyrin	6	7
(United Kingdom) J Murray (United States) R Ram	6	4	[5]
Alt	(Argentina) G Andreozzi (France) T Arribagé	1	6	[10]
(Italy) L Musetti (Italy) L Sonego	6^{0}	6	[10]
WC	(Italy) J Berrettini (Italy) M Berrettini	7^{7}	2	[8]
(Italy) F Cobolli (United States) S Korda	3	3
2	(Finland) H Heliövaara (United Kingdom) H Patten	6	6

Second round
WC	(Italy) F Bondioli (Italy) CA Caniato	3	2
(France) S Doumbia (France) F Reboul	6	6
(Australia) M Ebden (Australia) J Peers	6	6^{2}	[10]
3	(Germany) K Krawietz (Germany) T Pütz	2	7^{7}	[12]
(Italy) M Arnaldi (Australia) A Popyrin	6	4	[8]
Alt	(Argentina) G Andreozzi (France) T Arribagé	4	6	[10]
(Italy) L Musetti (Italy) L Sonego
2	(Finland) H Heliövaara (United Kingdom) H Patten	w/o

Quarterfinals
(France) S Doumbia (France) F Reboul	4	6	[10]
3	(Germany) K Krawietz (Germany) T Pütz	6	2	[3]
Alt	(Argentina) G Andreozzi (France) T Arribagé	3	6	[4]
2	(Finland) H Heliövaara (United Kingdom) H Patten	6	3	[10]

Semifinals
(France) S Doumbia (France) F Reboul	7^{7}	6
2	(Finland) H Heliövaara (United Kingdom) H Patten	6^{5}	4

== Seeded teams ==
The following are the seeded teams. Seedings are based on ATP rankings as of 5 May 2025.

Country	Player	Country	Player	Rank	Seed
ESA	Marcelo Arévalo	CRO	Mate Pavić	2	1
FIN	Harri Heliövaara	GBR	Henry Patten	7	2
GER	Kevin Krawietz	GER	Tim Pütz	11	3
ESP	Marcel Granollers	ARG	Horacio Zeballos	15	4
ITA	Simone Bolelli	ITA	Andrea Vavassori	19	5
CRO	Nikola Mektić	NZL	Michael Venus	29	6
USA	Christian Harrison	USA	Evan King	38	7
~~ARG~~	~~Máximo González~~	~~ARG~~	~~Andrés Molteni~~	~~40~~	~~8~~

=== Other entry information ===
==== Wildcards ====
- (Italy) Mattia Bellucci / (Italy) Filippo Romano
- (Italy) Jacopo Berrettini / (Italy) Matteo Berrettini
- (Italy) Federico Bondioli / (Italy) Carlo Alberto Caniato

==== Alternates ====
- (Argentina) Guido Andreozzi / (France) Théo Arribagé
- (Netherlands) Sander Arends / (United Kingdom) Luke Johnson
- (Monaco) Romain Arneodo / (France) Manuel Guinard
- (United States) Marcos Giron / (Brazil) Fernando Romboli
- (United States) Alex Michelsen / (United States) Learner Tien

==== Withdrawals ====
- (United Kingdom) Julian Cash / (United Kingdom) Lloyd Glasspool → replaced by (United Kingdom) Julian Cash / (Austria) Lucas Miedler
- (Spain) Alejandro Davidovich Fokina / (France) Arthur Fils → replaced by (Argentina) Guido Andreozzi / (France) Théo Arribagé
- (Argentina) Máximo González / (Argentina) Andrés Molteni → replaced by (United States) Marcos Giron / (Brazil) Fernando Romboli
- (Serbia) Miomir Kecmanović / (United States) Brandon Nakashima → replaced by (Netherlands) Sander Arends / (United Kingdom) Luke Johnson
- (Monaco) Hugo Nys / (France) Édouard Roger-Vasselin → replaced by (Uruguay) Ariel Behar / (Monaco) Hugo Nys
- (United States) Reilly Opelka / (United States) Tommy Paul → replaced by (Monaco) Romain Arneodo / (France) Manuel Guinard
- (Australia) John-Patrick Smith / (Australia) Jordan Thompson → replaced by (United States) Alex Michelsen / (United States) Learner Tien
