= 2025 Italian Open – Women's singles =

Women's singles
- 2025 Italian Open

Final
- Champion: (Italy) Jasmine Paolini
- Runner-up: (United States) Coco Gauff
- Score: 6–4, 6–2

Details
- Draw: 96 (12Q, 8WC)
- Seeds: 32

Events
Singles	men	women
Doubles	men	women
- Italian Open

Jasmine Paolini defeated Coco Gauff in the final, 6–4, 6–2 to win the women's singles tennis title at the 2025 Italian Open. It was her second WTA 1000 and third career WTA Tour singles title. Paolini was the second Italian woman in the Open Era to win the Italian Open singles title, after Raffaella Reggi in 1985. Paolini was the first Italian woman to win both the singles and doubles titles at the tournament in the same year since Reggi in 1985, and the first woman to do so in Rome since Monica Seles in 1990 and at a WTA 1000-level event overall since Vera Zvonareva in 2009. The final was also a rematch of the doubles final from the previous year.

Iga Świątek was the defending champion, but lost in the third round to Danielle Collins.

Gauff was the seventh and youngest woman to reach the finals of both the Madrid and Italian Opens in the same year. Peyton Stearns became the first player in the Open Era to win three straight WTA Tour matches in third-set tiebreakers, against Madison Keys, Naomi Osaka, and Elina Svitolina in the third round, fourth round, and quarterfinals respectively.

== Seeds ==
All seeds received a bye into the second round.

1. Aryna Sabalenka (quarterfinals)
2. (Poland) Iga Świątek (third round)
3. (United States) Jessica Pegula (third round)
4. (United States) Coco Gauff (final)
5. (United States) Madison Keys (third round)
6. (Italy) Jasmine Paolini (champion)
7. Mirra Andreeva (quarterfinals)
8. (China) Zheng Qinwen (semifinals)
9. (Spain) Paula Badosa (withdrew)
10. (United States) Emma Navarro (third round)
11. (Kazakhstan) Elena Rybakina (third round)
12. (Czech Republic) Karolína Muchová (withdrew)
13. Diana Shnaider (quarterfinals)
14. (Australia) Daria Kasatkina (second round)
15. (United States) Amanda Anisimova (second round)
16. (Ukraine) Elina Svitolina (quarterfinals)
17. (Latvia) Jeļena Ostapenko (fourth round)
18. (Brazil) Beatriz Haddad Maia (second round)
19. Liudmila Samsonova (second round)
20. (Croatia) Donna Vekić (second round)
21. Ekaterina Alexandrova (withdrew)
22. (Denmark) Clara Tauson (fourth round)
23. (Kazakhstan) Yulia Putintseva (second round)
24. (Canada) Leylah Fernandez (third round)
25. (Belgium) Elise Mertens (fourth round)
26. (Poland) Magdalena Fręch (third round)
27. (Tunisia) Ons Jabeur (third round)
28. Anna Kalinskaya (second round)
29. (United States) Danielle Collins (fourth round)
30. (Czech Republic) Linda Nosková (third round)
31. (United States) Sofia Kenin (third round)
32. (Poland) Magda Linette (third round)

Click on the seed number of a player to go to their draw section.

== Draw ==
Key

- Q = Qualifier
- WC = Wild card
- LL = Lucky loser
- Alt = Alternate
- ITF = ITF entry
- PR = Protected ranking
- SR = Special ranking
- SE = Special exempt
- JE = Junior exempt
- JR = Junior Accelerator Programme entrant
- CO = College Accelerator Programme entrant
- NG = Next Gen Accelerator Program entrant
- w/o = Walkover
- r = Retired
- d = Defaulted

=== Finals ===
Quarterfinals
1	Aryna Sabalenka	4	3
8	(China) Zheng Qinwen	6	6
4	(United States) Coco Gauff	6	7^{7}
7	Mirra Andreeva	4	6^{5}
6	(Italy) Jasmine Paolini	6^{1}	6	6
13	Diana Shnaider	7^{7}	4	2
(United States) Peyton Stearns	6	4	7^{7}
16	(Ukraine) Elina Svitolina	2	6	6^{4}

Semifinals
8	(China) Zheng Qinwen	6^{3}	6	6^{4}
4	(United States) Coco Gauff	7^{7}	4	7^{7}
6	(Italy) Jasmine Paolini	7	6
(United States) Peyton Stearns	5	1

Final
4	(United States) Coco Gauff	4	2
6	(Italy) Jasmine Paolini	6	6

=== Top half ===
==== Section 1 ====
First round
(Ukraine) D Yastremska	6	6^{6}	3
A Potapova	2	7^{8}	6
A Pavlyuchenkova	6	6
(United Kingdom) K Boulter	3	3
Q	(Croatia) A Ružić	3	6	7
WC	(Italy) TC Grant	6	3	5
(Philippines) A Eala	0	1
(Ukraine) M Kostyuk	6	6

Second round
1	A Sabalenka	6	6
A Potapova	2	2
A Pavlyuchenkova	3	0
31	(United States) S Kenin	6	6
24	(Canada) L Fernandez	6	6
Q	(Croatia) A Ružić	4	0
(Ukraine) M Kostyuk	6	6
14	(Australia) D Kasatkina	4	2

Third round
1	A Sabalenka	3	6	6
31	(United States) S Kenin	6	3	3
24	(Canada) L Fernandez	4	2
(Ukraine) M Kostyuk	6	6

Fourth round
1	A Sabalenka	6	7^{10}
(Ukraine) M Kostyuk	1	6^{8}

==== Section 2 ====
First round
(Japan) M Uchijima	1	0
(Germany) E Lys	6	6
PR	(Canada) B Andreescu	6	6
WC	(Italy) F Urgesi	0	3
V Azarenka	6	6
(Colombia) C Osorio	2	3
(Czech Republic) K Siniaková	6	4	4
(Serbia) O Danilović	3	6	6

Second round
11	(Kazakhstan) E Rybakina	7^{7}	6
(Germany) E Lys	6^{3}	2
PR	(Canada) B Andreescu	6	3	6
20	(Croatia) D Vekić	1	6	2
26	(Poland) M Fręch	7	6
V Azarenka	5	4
(Serbia) O Danilović	1	4
8	(China) Q Zheng	6	6

Third round
11	(Kazakhstan) E Rybakina	2	4
PR	(Canada) B Andreescu	6	6
26	(Poland) M Fręch	3	2
8	(China) Q Zheng	6	6

Fourth round
PR	(Canada) B Andreescu	5	1
8	(China) Q Zheng	7	6

==== Section 3 ====
First round
WC	(Italy) A Zucchini	2	3
Q	(Canada) V Mboko	6	6
Q	(Greece) M Sakkari	6	0
(Switzerland) B Bencic	2	0^{r}
Q	(Australia) M Joint	5	7^{7}	3
(United Kingdom) E Raducanu	7	6^{1}	6
WC	(Italy) L Stefanini	5	2
V Kudermetova	7	6

Second round
4	(United States) C Gauff	3	6	6
Q	(Canada) V Mboko	6	2	1
Q	(Greece) M Sakkari	6	4	1
32	(Poland) M Linette	1	6	6
LL	(Switzerland) J Teichmann	2	2
(United Kingdom) E Raducanu	6	6
V Kudermetova	7^{7}	7
15	(United States) A Anisimova	6^{5}	5

Third round
4	(United States) C Gauff	7	6
32	(Poland) M Linette	5	3
(United Kingdom) E Raducanu	5	6	6
V Kudermetova	7	0	1

Fourth round
4	(United States) C Gauff	6	6
(United Kingdom) E Raducanu	1	2

==== Section 4 ====
First round
LL	K Rakhimova	6	6
(China) Xin Wang	3	2
Q	(United States) K Volynets	6	6
Q	(Netherlands) A Rus	3	3
(Australia) K Birrell	6	3	4
(United Kingdom) S Kartal	4	6	6
Q	(Colombia) E Arango	7^{8}	5	6
(Bulgaria) V Tomova	6^{6}	7	4

Second round
10	(United States) E Navarro	6	6
LL	K Rakhimova	1	3
Q	(United States) K Volynets	5	1^{r}
22	(Denmark) C Tauson	7	4
30	(Czech Republic) L Nosková	6	6
(United Kingdom) S Kartal	4	2
Q	(Colombia) E Arango	2	4
7	M Andreeva	6	6

Third round
10	(United States) E Navarro	6	0	4
22	(Denmark) C Tauson	3	6	6
30	(Czech Republic) L Nosková	1	5
7	M Andreeva	6	7

Fourth round
22	(Denmark) C Tauson	7	3	2
7	M Andreeva	5	6	6

=== Bottom half ===
==== Section 5 ====
First round
WC	(Italy) G Pedone	6	1	3
(New Zealand) L Sun	3	6	6
PR	(Czech Republic) P Kvitová	7	6
(Romania) I-C Begu	5	1
(Slovakia) R Šramková	6	6
(United States) M Kessler	3	3
(Italy) L Bronzetti	6	6
PR	(Latvia) A Sevastova	3	4

Second round
6	(Italy) J Paolini	6	6
(New Zealand) L Sun	4	3
PR	(Czech Republic) P Kvitová
27	(Tunisia) O Jabeur	w/o
17	(Latvia) J Ostapenko	1	6	6
(Slovakia) R Šramková	6	4	3
(Italy) L Bronzetti	2	2
LL	(Germany) L Siegemund	6	6

Third round
6	(Italy) J Paolini	6	6
27	(Tunisia) O Jabeur	4	3
17	(Latvia) J Ostapenko	w/o
LL	(Germany) L Siegemund

Fourth round
6	(Italy) J Paolini	7	6
17	(Latvia) J Ostapenko	5	2

==== Section 6 ====
First round
(United States) C Dolehide	7^{7}	5	6
LL	(Australia) O Gadecki	6^{5}	7	2
(United States) A Parks	2	0
(Romania) J Cristian	6	6
(Netherlands) S Lamens	6	1	6
(Mexico) R Zarazúa	1	6	1
(United States) A Krueger	4	6	6
Q	(Hungary) A Bondár	6	2	1

Second round
13	D Shnaider	6	6
(United States) C Dolehide	0	0
(Romania) J Cristian	7^{7}	7
23	(Kazakhstan) Y Putintseva	6^{2}	5
25	(Belgium) E Mertens	3	6	6
(Netherlands) S Lamens	6	2	3
(United States) A Krueger	4	2
3	(United States) J Pegula	6	6

Third round
13	D Shnaider	6	6
(Romania) J Cristian	3	3
25	(Belgium) E Mertens	7	6
3	(United States) J Pegula	5	1

Fourth round
13	D Shnaider	6	6
25	(Belgium) E Mertens	2	3

==== Section 7 ====
First round
(France) V Gracheva	6	6
Q	(Australia) A Tomljanović	3	4
(United States) P Stearns	6	6
WC	(Italy) N Brancaccio	3	2
(Czech Republic) M Bouzková	6	7
(Egypt) M Sherif	2	5
WC	(Italy) S Errani	2	3
(Japan) N Osaka	6	6

Second round
5	(United States) M Keys	7^{7}	6
(France) V Gracheva	6^{4}	1
(United States) P Stearns	6	6
28	A Kalinskaya	2	3
18	(Brazil) B Haddad Maia	0	3
(Czech Republic) M Bouzková	6	6
(Japan) N Osaka	2	7	6
LL	(Switzerland) V Golubic	6	5	1

Third round
5	(United States) M Keys	6	2	6^{3}
(United States) P Stearns	2	6	7^{7}
(Czech Republic) M Bouzková	6	3	3
(Japan) N Osaka	4	6	6

Fourth round
(United States) P Stearns	6	3	7^{7}
(Japan) N Osaka	4	6	6^{4}

==== Section 8 ====
First round
(Spain) J Bouzas Maneiro	6	5	7^{7}
(United States) A Li	3	7	6^{3}
Q	(United States) H Baptiste	7^{9}	6
Q	A Blinkova	6^{7}	4
Q	(Romania) E-G Ruse	6^{10}	6	6
P Kudermetova	7^{12}	4	2
WC	(Italy) E Cocciaretto	6	4	6
(Armenia) E Avanesyan	2	6	1

Second round
16	(Ukraine) E Svitolina	6	7^{7}
(Spain) J Bouzas Maneiro	4	6^{2}
Q	(United States) H Baptiste	6	2	6
19	L Samsonova	3	6	4
29	(United States) D Collins	6	6
Q	(Romania) E-G Ruse	3	3
WC	(Italy) E Cocciaretto	1	0
2	(Poland) I Świątek	6	6

Third round
16	(Ukraine) E Svitolina	6	3	6
Q	(United States) H Baptiste	4	6	4
29	(United States) D Collins	6	7
2	(Poland) I Świątek	1	5

Fourth round
16	(Ukraine) E Svitolina	6	6
29	(United States) D Collins	4	2

== Seeded players ==
The following are the seeded players. Seedings are based on WTA rankings as of 21 April 2025. Rankings and points before are as of 5 May 2025.

Under the 2025 Rulebook, points from six of the seven combined WTA 1000 tournaments (which include Rome) are required to be counted in a player's ranking.

Seed	Rank	Player	Points before	Points defending	Points earned	Points after	Status
1	1	Aryna Sabalenka	11,118	650	215	10,683	Quarterfinals lost to (China) Zheng Qinwen [8]
2	2	(Poland) Iga Świątek	6,773	1,000	65	5,838	Third round lost to (United States) Danielle Collins [29]
3	4	(United States) Jessica Pegula	6,243	(65)^{†}	65	6,243	Third round lost to (Belgium) Elise Mertens [25]
4	3	(United States) Coco Gauff	6,603	390	650	6,863	Runner-up, lost to (Italy) Jasmine Paolini [6]
5	6	(United States) Madison Keys	4,824	215	65	4,674	Third round lost to (United States) Peyton Stearns
6	5	(Italy) Jasmine Paolini	4,875	10	1,000	5,865	Champion, defeated (United States) Coco Gauff [4]
7	7	Mirra Andreeva	4,781	10	215	4,986	Quarterfinals lost to (United States) Coco Gauff [4]
8	8	(China) Zheng Qinwen	4,193	215	390	4,368	Semifinals lost to (United States) Coco Gauff [4]
9	10	(Spain) Paula Badosa	3,761	120	0	3,641	Withdrew due to back injury
10	9	(United States) Emma Navarro	3,797	10+81	65+60	3,831	Third round lost to (Denmark) Clara Tauson [22]
11	12	(Kazakhstan) Elena Rybakina	2,983	0	65	3,048	Third round lost to (Canada) Bianca Andreescu [PR]
12	13	(Czech Republic) Karolína Muchová	2,919	(65)^{†}	0	2,854	Withdrew due to wrist injury
13	11	Diana Shnaider	3,023	65+125	215+60	3,108	Quarterfinals lost to (Italy) Jasmine Paolini [6]
14	15	(Australia) Daria Kasatkina	2,686	65	10	2,631	Second round lost to (Ukraine) Marta Kostyuk
15	17	(United States) Amanda Anisimova	2,617	10	10	2,617	Second round lost to Veronika Kudermetova
16	14	(Ukraine) Elina Svitolina	2,810	120	215	2,905	Quarterfinals lost to (United States) Peyton Stearns
17	18	(Latvia) Jeļena Ostapenko	2,235	215	120	2,140	Fourth round lost to (Italy) Jasmine Paolini [6]
18	22	(Brazil) Beatriz Haddad Maia	2,059	65	10	2,004	Second round lost to (Czech Republic) Marie Bouzková
19	21	Liudmila Samsonova	2,150	10	10	2,150	Second round lost to (United States) Hailey Baptiste [Q]
20	19	(Croatia) Donna Vekić	2,226	10	10	2,226	Second round lost to (Canada) Bianca Andreescu [PR]
21	20	Ekaterina Alexandrova	2,158	10	10	2,158	Withdrew due to shoulder injury
22	23	(Denmark) Clara Tauson	2,043	65	120	2,098	Fourth round lost to Mirra Andreeva [7]
23	29	(Kazakhstan) Yulia Putintseva	1,668	65	10	1,613	Second round lost to (Romania) Jaqueline Cristian
24	26	(Canada) Leylah Fernandez	1,708	10	65	1,763	Third round lost to (Ukraine) Marta Kostyuk
25	24	(Belgium) Elise Mertens	1,811	65	120	1,866	Fourth round lost to Diana Shnaider [13]
26	25	(Poland) Magdalena Fręch	1,800	35	65	1,830	Third round lost to (China) Zheng Qinwen [8]
27	36	(Tunisia) Ons Jabeur	1,458	10	65	1,523	Third round lost to (Italy) Jasmine Paolini [6]
28	28	Anna Kalinskaya	1,674	65	10	1,619	Second round lost to (United States) Peyton Stearns
29	35	(United States) Danielle Collins	1,461	390	120	1,191	Fourth round lost to (Ukraine) Elina Svitolina [16]
30	30	(Czech Republic) Linda Nosková	1,628	65	65	1,628	Third round lost to Mirra Andreeva [7]
31	31	(United States) Sofia Kenin	1,618	65	65	1,618	Third round lost to Aryna Sabalenka [1]
32	32	(Poland) Magda Linette	1,551	35	65	1,581	Third round lost to (United States) Coco Gauff [4]

† The player withdrew from the 2024 tournament but was not required to carry a 0-point penalty in her ranking due to a long-term injury exemption. Points from her 18th best result will be deducted instead.

=== Withdrawn seeded players ===
The following player would have been seeded, but withdrew before the tournament began.

Rank	Player	Points before	Points dropping	Points after	Withdrawal reason
16	(Czech Republic) Barbora Krejčíková	2,664	0	2,664	Back injury

== Other entry information ==
=== Wildcards ===
- (Italy) Nuria Brancaccio
- (Italy) Elisabetta Cocciaretto
- (Italy) Sara Errani
- (Italy) Tyra Caterina Grant
- (Italy) Giorgia Pedone
- (Italy) Lucrezia Stefanini
- (Italy) Federica Urgesi
- (Italy) Arianna Zucchini

=== Protected ranking ===
- (Canada) Bianca Andreescu
- ~~(Romania) Sorana Cîrstea~~
- (Czech Republic) Petra Kvitová
- (Latvia) Anastasija Sevastova

=== Withdrawals ===
- § Ekaterina Alexandrova → replaced by (Switzerland) Jil Teichmann
- § (Spain) Paula Badosa → replaced by (Switzerland) Viktorija Golubic
- § (Romania) Sorana Cîrstea → replaced by (Australia) Olivia Gadecki
- ‡ (Ukraine) Anhelina Kalinina → replaced by (Romania) Irina-Camelia Begu
- ‡ (Czech Republic) Barbora Krejčíková → replaced by (United States) Caroline Dolehide
- § (Czech Republic) Karolína Muchová → replaced by (Germany) Laura Siegemund
- § (Czech Republic) Markéta Vondroušová → replaced by Kamilla Rakhimova

‡ – withdrew from entry list
§ – withdrew from main draw

== Qualifying ==
=== Seeds ===
1. (United States) Katie Volynets (qualified)
2. Anna Blinkova (qualified)
3. (Turkey) Zeynep Sönmez (first round)
4. (Australia) Maya Joint (qualified)
5. (Australia) Ajla Tomljanović (qualified)
6. (Germany) Tatjana Maria (first round)
7. (United States) Bernarda Pera (first round)
8. (Greece) Maria Sakkari (qualified)
9. Kamilla Rakhimova (qualifying competition, lucky loser)
10. (Colombia) Emiliana Arango (qualified)
11. (Romania) Elena-Gabriela Ruse (qualified)
12. (United States) Hailey Baptiste (qualified)
13. (Romania) Anca Todoni (qualifying competition, withdrew)
14. (Australia) Olivia Gadecki (qualifying competition, lucky loser)
15. (Switzerland) Viktorija Golubic (qualifying competition, lucky loser)
16. (Netherlands) Arantxa Rus (qualified)
17. (Spain) Cristina Bucșa (first round)
18. (Germany) Laura Siegemund (qualifying competition, lucky loser)
19. (Switzerland) Jil Teichmann (qualifying competition, lucky loser)
20. Erika Andreeva (first round)
21. (Ukraine) Yuliia Starodubtseva (first round)
22. (Hungary) Anna Bondár (qualified)
23. (China) Yuan Yue (first round)
24. Anastasia Zakharova (first round)

=== Qualifiers ===
1. (United States) Katie Volynets
2. Anna Blinkova
3. (Hungary) Anna Bondár
4. (Australia) Maya Joint
5. (Australia) Ajla Tomljanović
6. (Croatia) Antonia Ružić
7. (Netherlands) Arantxa Rus
8. (Greece) Maria Sakkari
9. (Canada) Victoria Mboko
10. (Colombia) Emiliana Arango
11. (Romania) Elena-Gabriela Ruse
12. (United States) Hailey Baptiste

=== Lucky losers ===
1. (Australia) Olivia Gadecki
2. Kamilla Rakhimova
3. (Switzerland) Viktorija Golubic
4. (Germany) Laura Siegemund
5. (Switzerland) Jil Teichmann

=== Qualifying draw ===
==== First qualifier ====
First round
1	(United States) Katie Volynets	2	6	6
Aliaksandra Sasnovich	6	3	4
(United States) Varvara Lepchenko	6	6
20	Erika Andreeva	2	3

Qualifying competition
1	(United States) Katie Volynets	6	6
(United States) Varvara Lepchenko	2	4

==== Second qualifier ====
First round
2	Anna Blinkova	6	6
WC	(Italy) Lisa Pigato	4	2
(United Kingdom) Harriet Dart	2	2
13	(Romania) Anca Todoni	6	6

Qualifying competition
2	Anna Blinkova	w/o
13	(Romania) Anca Todoni

==== Third qualifier ====
First round
3	(Turkey) Zeynep Sönmez	5	6	3
(Germany) Ella Seidel	7	2	6
PR	(France) Alizé Cornet	4	4
22	(Hungary) Anna Bondár	6	6

Qualifying competition
(Germany) Ella Seidel	5	4
22	(Hungary) Anna Bondár	7	6

==== Fourth qualifier ====
First round
4	(Australia) Maya Joint	6	6
(Argentina) María Lourdes Carlé	3	1
PR	(Belgium) Yanina Wickmayer	6	3	3
15	(Switzerland) Viktorija Golubic	2	6	6

Qualifying competition
4	(Australia) Maya Joint	4	7	6
15	(Switzerland) Viktorija Golubic	6	5	2

==== Fifth qualifier ====
First round
5	(Australia) Ajla Tomljanović	6	6
WC	(Italy) Angelica Raggi	2	1
WC	(Italy) Nicole Fossa Huergo	2	0
14	(Australia) Olivia Gadecki	6	6

Qualifying competition
5	(Australia) Ajla Tomljanović	6	6
14	(Australia) Olivia Gadecki	1	3

==== Sixth qualifier ====
First round
6	(Germany) Tatjana Maria	0	1
(Germany) Jule Niemeier	6	6
(Croatia) Antonia Ružić	6	6
23	(China) Yuan Yue	3	4

Qualifying competition
(Germany) Jule Niemeier	3	3
(Croatia) Antonia Ružić	6	6

==== Seventh qualifier ====
First round
7	(United States) Bernarda Pera	3	6	3
(China) Wang Xiyu	6	3	6
WC	(Italy) Anastasia Abbagnato	1	4
16	(Netherlands) Arantxa Rus	6	6

Qualifying competition
(China) Wang Xiyu	2	2
16	(Netherlands) Arantxa Rus	6	6

==== Eighth qualifier ====
First round
8	(Greece) Maria Sakkari	4	6	6
(France) Chloé Paquet	6	3	2
(Poland) Maja Chwalińska	6^{6}	7	6
21	(Ukraine) Yuliia Starodubtseva	7^{8}	5	1

Qualifying competition
8	(Greece) Maria Sakkari	3	6	6
(Poland) Maja Chwalińska	6	3	1

==== Ninth qualifier ====
First round
9	Kamilla Rakhimova	6	6
(Spain) Leyre Romero Gormaz	3	0
WC	(Canada) Victoria Mboko	6	6
17	(Spain) Cristina Bucșa	3	2

Qualifying competition
9	Kamilla Rakhimova	6	1	1
WC	(Canada) Victoria Mboko	4	6	6

==== Tenth qualifier ====
First round
10	(Colombia) Emiliana Arango	6	6
(Canada) Marina Stakusic	4	4
(France) Léolia Jeanjean	2	6	7
24	Anastasia Zakharova	6	4	5

Qualifying competition
10	(Colombia) Emiliana Arango	4	7	3
(France) Léolia Jeanjean	6	5	0^{r}

==== Eleventh qualifier ====
First round
11	(Romania) Elena-Gabriela Ruse	6	7
(Argentina) Solana Sierra	2	5
(Australia) Daria Saville	4	1
18	(Germany) Laura Siegemund	6	6

Qualifying competition
11	(Romania) Elena-Gabriela Ruse	7	6
18	(Germany) Laura Siegemund	5	2

==== Twelfth qualifier ====
First round
12	(United States) Hailey Baptiste	6	7^{7}
PR	(Australia) Storm Hunter	0	6^{2}
WC	(Italy) Federica Di Sarra	3	2
19	(Switzerland) Jil Teichmann	6	6

Qualifying competition
12	(United States) Hailey Baptiste	7^{8}	7
19	(Switzerland) Jil Teichmann	6^{6}	5
