= 2025 Italian Open =

- Date: 6–18 May 2025
- Edition: 82nd
- Category: ATP 1000 (men); WTA 1000 (women)
- Draw: 96S / 32D
- Surface: Clay / outdoor
- Location: Rome, Italy
- Venue: Foro Italico

Champions

Men's singles
- (Spain) Carlos Alcaraz

Women's singles
- (Italy) Jasmine Paolini

Men's doubles
- (El Salvador) Marcelo Arévalo / (Croatia) Mate Pavić

Women's doubles
- (Italy) Sara Errani / (Italy) Jasmine Paolini
- Italian Open

The 2025 Italian Open (also known as the Internazionali BNL d'Italia for sponsorship reasons) was a professional tennis tournament played on outdoor clay courts at the Foro Italico in Rome, Italy. It was the 82nd edition of the Italian Open and was classified as an ATP 1000 event on the 2025 ATP Tour and a WTA 1000 event on the 2025 WTA Tour. The 2025 tournament was held between 6 and 18 May 2025.

== Champions ==
=== Men's singles ===
- (Spain) Carlos Alcaraz def. (Italy) Jannik Sinner, 7–6^{(7–5)}, 6–1

=== Women's singles ===
- (Italy) Jasmine Paolini def. (United States) Coco Gauff, 6–4, 6–2

=== Men's doubles ===
- (El Salvador) Marcelo Arévalo / (Croatia) Mate Pavić def. (France) Sadio Doumbia / (France) Fabien Reboul, 6–4, 6–7^{(6–8)}, [13–11]

=== Women's doubles ===
- (Italy) Sara Errani / (Italy) Jasmine Paolini def. Veronika Kudermetova / (Belgium) Elise Mertens 6–4, 7–5

== Point distribution ==
Event	W	F	SF	QF	R16	R32	R64	R128	Q	Q2	Q1
Men's singles	1000	650	400	200	100	50	30*	10	20	10	0
Men's doubles	1000	600	360	180	90	0	—N/a	—N/a	—N/a	—N/a	—N/a
Women's singles	1000	650	390	215	120	65	35*	10	30	20	2
Women's doubles	1000	650	390	215	120	10	—N/a	—N/a	—N/a	—N/a	—N/a

* Players with byes receive first-round points.

=== Prize money ===
Event	W	F	SF	QF	R16	R32	R64	R128	Q2	Q1
Men's singles	€963,225	€512,260	€284,590	€161,995	€88,440	€51,665	€30,255	€20,360	€11,820	€6,130
Women's singles	€963,225	€512,260	€284,590	€161,995	€88,440	€51,665	€30,255	€20,360	€11,820	€6,130
Men's doubles*	€391,680	€207,360	€111,360	€55,690	€29,860	€16,320	—N/a	—N/a	—N/a	—N/a
Women's doubles*	€391,680	€207,360	€111,360	€55,690	€29,860	€16,320	—N/a	—N/a	—N/a	—N/a

*per team
