= 2025 Italian Open – Women's doubles =

Women's doubles
- 2025 Italian Open

Final
- Champions: (Italy) Sara Errani (Italy) Jasmine Paolini
- Runners-up: Veronika Kudermetova (Belgium) Elise Mertens
- Score: 6–4, 7–5

Details
- Draw: 32
- Seeds: 8

Events
| Singles | men | women |
| Doubles | men | women |
| ← 2024 · | Italian Open | · 2026 → |

Defending champions Sara Errani and Jasmine Paolini defeated Veronika Kudermetova and Elise Mertens in the final, 6–4, 7–5 to win the women's doubles tennis title at the 2025 Italian Open. They were the first players to defend the title since Ashleigh Barty in 2019, and the first all-Italian women's pair to do so. Paolini was the first Italian woman to win both the singles and doubles titles at the tournament in the same year since Raffaella Reggi in 1985, and the first woman to do so overall since Monica Seles in 1990.

== Seeds ==
1. (Canada) Gabriela Dabrowski / (New Zealand) Erin Routliffe (quarterfinals)
2. (Czech Republic) Kateřina Siniaková / (China) Zhang Shuai (first round)
3. (Italy) Sara Errani / (Italy) Jasmine Paolini (champions)
4. (Chinese Taipei) Hsieh Su-wei / (Latvia) Jeļena Ostapenko (second round)
5. (United States) Caroline Dolehide / (United States) Desirae Krawczyk (first round)
6. Mirra Andreeva / Diana Shnaider (semifinals)
7. (Kazakhstan) Anna Danilina / Irina Khromacheva (first round)
8. (United States) Asia Muhammad / (Netherlands) Demi Schuurs (quarterfinals)

== Draw ==
=== Key ===
- Q = Qualifier
- WC = Wild card
- LL = Lucky loser
- Alt = Alternate
- ITF = ITF entry
- PR = Protected ranking
- SR = Special ranking
- SE = Special exempt
- JE = Junior exempt
- JR = Junior Accelerator Programme entrant
- CO = College Accelerator Programme entrant
- NG = Next Gen Accelerator Program entrant
- w/o = Walkover
- r = Retired
- d = Defaulted

=== Finals ===
Semifinals
6 | Mirra Andreeva; Diana Shnaider | 4 | 4
3 | (Italy) Sara Errani (Italy) Jasmine Paolini | 6 | 6
Veronika Kudermetova (Belgium) Elise Mertens | 6 | 6
PR | (Australia) Storm Hunter (Australia) Ellen Perez | 2 | 2

Final
3 | (Italy) Sara Errani (Italy) Jasmine Paolini | 6 | 7
Veronika Kudermetova (Belgium) Elise Mertens | 4 | 5

=== Top half ===
First round
1 | (Canada) G Dabrowski (New Zealand) E Routliffe | 6 | 6
(Romania) M Niculescu (Poland) K Piter | 4 | 1
(Australia) D Kasatkina (United States) P Stearns | 6 | 6
(Japan) S Aoyama (Ukraine) N Kichenok | 3 | 4
(Chinese Taipei) H-c Chan (Mexico) G Olmos | 6 | 1 | [10]
(China) Xin Wang (China) S Zheng | 4 | 6 | [7]
(Czech Republic) L Nosková (Denmark) C Tauson | 3 | 1
6 | M Andreeva; D Shnaider | 6 | 6
3 | (Italy) S Errani (Italy) J Paolini | 6 | 6
(China) X Jiang (Chinese Taipei) F-h Wu | 3 | 4
(Canada) L Fernandez (Kazakhstan) Y Putintseva | 6 | 6
(Japan) M Ninomiya (China) Y Xu | 3 | 2
A Panova (Hungary) F Stollár | 3 | 1
WC | (Philippines) A Eala (United States) C Gauff | 6 | 6
WC | (Italy) TC Grant (Italy) L Pigato | 2 | 6 | [10]
7 | (Kazakhstan) A Danilina; I Khromacheva | 6 | 4 | [5]

Second round
1 | (Canada) G Dabrowski (New Zealand) E Routliffe | w/o
(Australia) D Kasatkina (United States) P Stearns
(Chinese Taipei) H-c Chan (Mexico) G Olmos | 4 | 2
6 | M Andreeva; D Shnaider | 6 | 6
3 | (Italy) S Errani (Italy) J Paolini | 6 | 4 | [10]
(Canada) L Fernandez (Kazakhstan) Y Putintseva | 4 | 6 | [7]
WC | (Philippines) A Eala (United States) C Gauff | 6 | 6
WC | (Italy) TC Grant (Italy) L Pigato | 2 | 3

Quarterfinals
1 | (Canada) G Dabrowski (New Zealand) E Routliffe | 2 | 6 | [9]
6 | M Andreeva; D Shnaider | 6 | 4 | [11]
3 | (Italy) S Errani (Italy) J Paolini | 7 | 3 | [10]
WC | (Philippines) A Eala (United States) C Gauff | 5 | 6 | [7]

Semifinals
6 | M Andreeva; D Shnaider | 4 | 4
3 | (Italy) S Errani (Italy) J Paolini | 6 | 6

=== Bottom half ===
First round
8 | (United States) A Muhammad (Netherlands) D Schuurs | 5 | 6 | [10]
(Spain) C Bucșa (Italy) A Moratelli | 7 | 0 | [7]
WC | (Italy) L Bronzetti (Italy) E Cocciaretto | 0 | 4
(United States) S Kenin (Ukraine) L Kichenok | 6 | 6
V Kudermetova (Belgium) E Mertens | 6 | 6
(Hungary) T Babos (Brazil) L Stefani | 4 | 2
(Slovakia) T Mihalíková (United Kingdom) O Nicholls | 1 | 2
4 | (Chinese Taipei) S-w Hsieh (Latvia) J Ostapenko | 6 | 6
5 | (United States) C Dolehide (United States) D Krawczyk | 6^{6} | 6 | [8]
Alt | (Norway) U Eikeri (Japan) E Hozumi | 7^{8} | 4 | [10]
(Japan) M Kato (Indonesia) A Sutjiadi | 3 | 2
(Ukraine) M Kostyuk (Romania) E-G Ruse | 6 | 6
PR | (Australia) S Hunter (Australia) E Perez | 6 | 6
(Poland) M Linette (Slovakia) R Šramková | 1 | 2
(United States) N Melichar-Martinez; L Samsonova | 2 | 6 | [10]
2 | (Czech Republic) K Siniaková (China) S Zhang | 6 | 0 | [4]

Second round
8 | (United States) A Muhammad (Netherlands) D Schuurs | 7^{7} | 4 | [10]
(United States) S Kenin (Ukraine) L Kichenok | 6^{4} | 6 | [7]
V Kudermetova (Belgium) E Mertens | 7 | 6
4 | (Chinese Taipei) S-w Hsieh (Latvia) J Ostapenko | 5 | 2
Alt | (Norway) U Eikeri (Japan) E Hozumi | w/o
(Ukraine) M Kostyuk (Romania) E-G Ruse
PR | (Australia) S Hunter (Australia) E Perez | 7^{7} | 6
(United States) N Melichar-Martinez; L Samsonova | 6^{4} | 4

Quarterfinals
8 | (United States) A Muhammad (Netherlands) D Schuurs | 6 | 2 | [4]
V Kudermetova (Belgium) E Mertens | 3 | 6 | [10]
Alt | (Norway) U Eikeri (Japan) E Hozumi | 6 | 2 | [5]
PR | (Australia) S Hunter (Australia) E Perez | 4 | 6 | [10]

Semifinals
V Kudermetova (Belgium) E Mertens | 6 | 6
PR | (Australia) S Hunter (Australia) E Perez | 2 | 2

== Seeded teams ==
The following are the seeded teams, based on WTA rankings as of April 21, 2025.

| Country | Player | Country | Player | Rank^{1} | Seed |
|---|---|---|---|---|---|
| CAN | Gabriela Dabrowski | NZL | Erin Routliffe | 8 | 1 |
| CZE | Kateřina Siniaková | CHN | Zhang Shuai | 11 | 2 |
| ITA | Sara Errani | ITA | Jasmine Paolini | 12 | 3 |
| TPE | Hsieh Su-wei | LAT | Jeļena Ostapenko | 15 | 4 |
| USA | Caroline Dolehide | USA | Desirae Krawczyk | 26 | 5 |
| | Mirra Andreeva | | Diana Shnaider | 31 | 6 |
| KAZ | Anna Danilina | | Irina Khromacheva | 32 | 7 |
| USA | Asia Muhammad | NED | Demi Schuurs | 32 | 8 |

== Other entry information ==
=== Wildcards ===
- (Italy) Lucia Bronzetti / (Italy) Elisabetta Cocciaretto
- (Philippines) Alexandra Eala / (United States) Coco Gauff
- (Italy) Tyra Caterina Grant / (Italy) Lisa Pigato

=== Protected ranking ===
- (Australia) Storm Hunter / (Australia) Ellen Perez

=== Alternates ===
- (Norway) Ulrikke Eikeri / (Japan) Eri Hozumi

=== Withdrawals ===
- (Brazil) Beatriz Haddad Maia / (Germany) Laura Siegemund → replaced by (Norway) Ulrikke Eikeri / (Japan) Eri Hozumi
