= 2023 Italian Open – Women's doubles =

Women's doubles
- 2023 Italian Open

Final
- Champions: (Australia) Storm Hunter (Belgium) Elise Mertens
- Runners-up: (United States) Coco Gauff (United States) Jessica Pegula
- Score: 6–4, 6–4

Details
- Draw: 32
- Seeds: 8

Events
Singles	men	women
Doubles	men	women
← 2022 ·	Italian Open	· 2024 →

Storm Hunter and Elise Mertens defeated Coco Gauff and Jessica Pegula in the final, 6–4, 6–4 to win the women's doubles tennis title at the 2023 Italian Open.

Veronika Kudermetova and Anastasia Pavlyuchenkova were the defending champions, but lost in the first round to Victoria Azarenka and Beatriz Haddad Maia.

== Seeds ==
1. (United States) Coco Gauff / (United States) Jessica Pegula (final)
2. (Ukraine) Lyudmyla Kichenok / (Latvia) Jeļena Ostapenko (quarterfinals)
3. (United States) Desirae Krawczyk / (Netherlands) Demi Schuurs (semifinals)
4. (Australia) Storm Hunter / (Belgium) Elise Mertens (champions)
5. (Canada) Gabriela Dabrowski / (Brazil) Luisa Stefani (first round)
6. (Japan) Shuko Aoyama / (Japan) Ena Shibahara (quarterfinals)
7. (United States) Asia Muhammad / (Mexico) Giuliana Olmos (first round)
8. (China) Xu Yifan / (China) Yang Zhaoxuan (first round)

== Draw ==
=== Key ===
- Q = Qualifier
- WC = Wild card
- LL = Lucky loser
- Alt = Alternate
- ITF = ITF entry
- PR = Protected ranking
- SR = Special ranking
- SE = Special exempt
- JE = Junior exempt
- JR = Junior Accelerator Programme entrant
- CO = College Accelerator Programme entrant
- NG = Next Gen Accelerator Program entrant
- w/o = Walkover
- r = Retired
- d = Defaulted

=== Finals ===
Semifinals
1	(United States) Coco Gauff (United States) Jessica Pegula	4	7^{7}	[10]
3	(United States) Desirae Krawczyk (Netherlands) Demi Schuurs	6	6^{5}	[8]
4	(Australia) Storm Hunter (Belgium) Elise Mertens	7	6
PR	(Czech Republic) Marie Bouzková (United States) Bethanie Mattek-Sands	5	4

Final
1	(United States) Coco Gauff (United States) Jessica Pegula	4	4
4	(Australia) Storm Hunter (Belgium) Elise Mertens	6	6

=== Top half ===
First round
1	(United States) C Gauff (United States) J Pegula	6	7
(Georgia (country)) O Kalashnikova; Y Sizikova	1	5
(United States) N Melichar-Martinez; A Panova	6	7
WC	(Italy) J Paolini (Italy) M Trevisan	3	5
E Alexandrova; A Potapova	7	6
(Czech Republic) M Kolodziejová; V Zvonareva	5	2
(Chile) A Guarachi (New Zealand) E Routliffe	3	4
6	(Japan) S Aoyama (Japan) E Shibahara	6	6
3	(United States) D Krawczyk (Netherlands) D Schuurs	w/o
A Kalinskaya (United States) C McNally
(Ukraine) M Kostyuk (Romania) E-G Ruse	6	6
(Slovakia) T Mihalíková (United States) A Parks	2	4
Alt	D Kasatkina (Kazakhstan) Y Putintseva	3^{r}
(Romania) M Niculescu (Japan) M Ninomiya	4
(Norway) U Eikeri (Japan) M Kato	6	7
8	(China) Y Xu (China) Z Yang	3	5

Second round
1	(United States) C Gauff (United States) J Pegula	6^{2}	7^{7}	[10]
(United States) N Melichar-Martinez; A Panova	7^{7}	6^{5}	[8]
E Alexandrova; A Potapova	3	3
6	(Japan) S Aoyama (Japan) E Shibahara	6	6
3	(United States) D Krawczyk (Netherlands) D Schuurs	6	6
(Ukraine) M Kostyuk (Romania) E-G Ruse	0	1
(Romania) M Niculescu (Japan) M Ninomiya	4	6	[6]
(Norway) U Eikeri (Japan) M Kato	6	4	[10]

Quarterfinals
1	(United States) C Gauff (United States) J Pegula	7^{7}	6
6	(Japan) S Aoyama (Japan) E Shibahara	6^{5}	4
3	(United States) D Krawczyk (Netherlands) D Schuurs	6	6
(Norway) U Eikeri (Japan) M Kato	3	3

Semifinals
1	(United States) C Gauff (United States) J Pegula	4	7^{7}	[10]
3	(United States) D Krawczyk (Netherlands) D Schuurs	6	6^{5}	[8]

=== Bottom half ===
First round
7	(United States) A Muhammad (Mexico) G Olmos	6	3	[6]
(Hungary) T Babos (Kazakhstan) A Danilina	4	6	[10]
V Kudermetova; A Pavlyuchenkova	2	3
V Azarenka (Brazil) B Haddad Maia	6	6
WC	(Italy) A Moratelli (Italy) C Rosatello	6	3	[10]
PR	(United States) S Kenin; A Sasnovich	4	6	[7]
(Belgium) K Flipkens (Poland) A Rosolska	0	7^{8}	[4]
4	(Australia) S Hunter (Belgium) E Mertens	6	6^{6}	[10]
5	(Canada) G Dabrowski (Brazil) L Stefani	6	2	[8]
PR	(Czech Republic) M Bouzková (United States) B Mattek-Sands	2	6	[10]
PR	(Chinese Taipei) S-w Hsieh (Czech Republic) B Strýcová	6^{3}	6	[6]
(Ukraine) N Kichenok (Belgium) K Zimmermann	7^{7}	3	[10]
(Poland) M Linette (Czech Republic) M Vondroušová	7^{9}	4	[12]
(Chinese Taipei) H-c Chan (Chinese Taipei) L Chan	6^{7}	6	[10]
WC	(Italy) L Bronzetti (Italy) E Cocciaretto
2	(Ukraine) L Kichenok (Latvia) J Ostapenko	w/o

Second round
(Hungary) T Babos (Kazakhstan) A Danilina	w/o
V Azarenka (Brazil) B Haddad Maia
WC	(Italy) A Moratelli (Italy) C Rosatello	1	6^{6}
4	(Australia) S Hunter (Belgium) E Mertens	6	7^{8}
PR	(Czech Republic) M Bouzková (United States) B Mattek-Sands	6	6
(Ukraine) N Kichenok (Belgium) K Zimmermann	4	2
(Poland) M Linette (Czech Republic) M Vondroušová	3	2
2	(Ukraine) L Kichenok (Latvia) J Ostapenko	6	6

Quarterfinals
(Hungary) T Babos (Kazakhstan) A Danilina	4	2
4	(Australia) S Hunter (Belgium) E Mertens	6	6
PR	(Czech Republic) M Bouzková (United States) B Mattek-Sands	7^{7}	6
2	(Ukraine) L Kichenok (Latvia) J Ostapenko	6^{3}	3

Semifinals
4	(Australia) S Hunter (Belgium) E Mertens	7	6
PR	(Czech Republic) M Bouzková (United States) B Mattek-Sands	5	4

== Seeded teams ==
The following are the seeded teams. Seedings are based on WTA rankings as of April 24, 2023.

Country	Player	Country	Player	Rank	Seed
USA	Coco Gauff	USA	Jessica Pegula	7	1
UKR	Lyudmyla Kichenok	LAT	Jeļena Ostapenko	18	2
USA	Desirae Krawczyk	NED	Demi Schuurs	21	3
AUS	Storm Hunter	BEL	Elise Mertens	28	4
CAN	Gabriela Dabrowski	BRA	Luisa Stefani	32	5
JPN	Shuko Aoyama	JPN	Ena Shibahara	40	6
USA	Asia Muhammad	MEX	Giuliana Olmos	40	7
CHN	Xu Yifan	CHN	Yang Zhaoxuan	42	8

== Other entry information ==
=== Wildcards ===
- (Italy) Lucia Bronzetti / (Italy) Elisabetta Cocciaretto
- (Italy) Angelica Moratelli / (Italy) Camilla Rosatello
- (Italy) Jasmine Paolini / (Italy) Martina Trevisan

=== Protected ranking ===
- (Czech Republic) Marie Bouzková / (United States) Bethanie Mattek-Sands
- (Chinese Taipei) Hsieh Su-wei / (Czech Republic) Barbora Strýcová
- (United States) Sofia Kenin / Aliaksandra Sasnovich

=== Alternates ===
- Daria Kasatkina / (Kazakhstan) Yulia Putintseva

=== Withdrawals ===
- (Canada) Leylah Fernandez / (United States) Taylor Townsend → replaced by Daria Kasatkina / (Kazakhstan) Yulia Putintseva
