= 2024 Italian Open – Women's doubles =

Women's doubles
- 2024 Italian Open

Final
- Champions: (Italy) Sara Errani (Italy) Jasmine Paolini
- Runners-up: (United States) Coco Gauff (New Zealand) Erin Routliffe
- Score: 6–3, 4–6, [10–8]

Details
- Draw: 32
- Seeds: 8

Events
Singles	men	women
Doubles	men	women
← 2023 ·	Italian Open	· 2025 →

Sara Errani and Jasmine Paolini defeated Coco Gauff and Erin Routliffe in the final, 6–3, 4–6, [10–8] to win the women's doubles tennis title at the 2024 Italian Open. They became the first all-Italian female pair to win the title since 2012, when Errani did so partnering Roberta Vinci.

Storm Hunter and Elise Mertens were the reigning champions, but Hunter could not participate this year due to injury. Mertens partnered Hsieh Su-wei, but lost in the quarterfinals to Wang Xinyu and Zheng Saisai.

== Seeds ==
1. (Chinese Taipei) Hsieh Su-wei / (Belgium) Elise Mertens (quarterfinals)
2. (United States) Nicole Melichar-Martinez / (Australia) Ellen Perez (first round)
3. (United States) Coco Gauff / (New Zealand) Erin Routliffe (final)
4. (Netherlands) Demi Schuurs / (Brazil) Luisa Stefani (first round)
5. (Czech Republic) Kateřina Siniaková / (United States) Taylor Townsend (quarterfinals)
6. (Ukraine) Lyudmyla Kichenok / (Latvia) Jeļena Ostapenko (quarterfinals)
7. (Czech Republic) Barbora Krejčíková / (Germany) Laura Siegemund (withdrew)
8. (United States) Caroline Dolehide / (United States) Desirae Krawczyk (semifinals)
9. (Chinese Taipei) Chan Hao-ching / Veronika Kudermetova (second round, withdrew)

== Draw ==
=== Key ===
- Q = Qualifier
- WC = Wild card
- LL = Lucky loser
- Alt = Alternate
- ITF = ITF entry
- PR = Protected ranking
- SR = Special ranking
- SE = Special exempt
- JE = Junior exempt
- JR = Junior Accelerator Programme entrant
- CO = College Accelerator Programme entrant
- NG = Next Gen Accelerator Program entrant
- w/o = Walkover
- r = Retired
- d = Defaulted

=== Finals ===
Semifinals
PR	(China) Wang Xinyu (China) Zheng Saisai	3	6^{3}
3	(United States) Coco Gauff (New Zealand) Erin Routliffe	6	7^{7}
8	(United States) Caroline Dolehide (United States) Desirae Krawczyk	1	2
(Italy) Sara Errani (Italy) Jasmine Paolini	6	6

Final
3	(United States) Coco Gauff (New Zealand) Erin Routliffe	3	6	[8]
(Italy) Sara Errani (Italy) Jasmine Paolini	6	4	[10]

=== Top half ===
First round
1	(Chinese Taipei) S-w Hsieh (Belgium) E Mertens	7	6
WC	A Kalinskaya; E Vesnina	5	2
(Japan) M Kato (Ukraine) N Kichenok	3	1
(United States) S Kenin (United States) B Mattek-Sands	6	6
(United Kingdom) H Watson (China) Y Xu	3	6	[8]
PR	(China) Xin Wang (China) S Zheng	6	1	[10]
(Kazakhstan) A Danilina (Estonia) I Neel	1	3
9	(Chinese Taipei) H-c Chan; V Kudermetova	6	6
3	(United States) C Gauff (New Zealand) E Routliffe	4	6	[10]
Alt	(China) Xiy Wang (China) Y Yuan	6	3	[4]
M Andreeva; V Zvonareva	7	6
(Poland) M Linette (China) S Zhang	5	3
(Japan) E Hozumi (Japan) M Ninomiya	6	6
(United States) A Muhammad (Indonesia) A Sutjiadi	2	2
PR	(Japan) S Aoyama (Serbia) A Krunić	3	1
5	(Czech Republic) K Siniaková (United States) T Townsend	6	6

Second round
1	(Chinese Taipei) S-w Hsieh (Belgium) E Mertens	6	4	[11]
(United States) S Kenin (United States) B Mattek-Sands	4	6	[9]
PR	(China) Xin Wang (China) S Zheng	w/o
9	(Chinese Taipei) H-c Chan; V Kudermetova
3	(United States) C Gauff (New Zealand) E Routliffe	4	6	[10]
M Andreeva; V Zvonareva	6	4	[8]
(Japan) E Hozumi (Japan) M Ninomiya	2	3
5	(Czech Republic) K Siniaková (United States) T Townsend	6	6

Quarterfinals
1	(Chinese Taipei) S-w Hsieh (Belgium) E Mertens	0	6	[7]
PR	(China) Xin Wang (China) S Zheng	6	4	[10]
3	(United States) C Gauff (New Zealand) E Routliffe	6	7^{7}
5	(Czech Republic) K Siniaková (United States) T Townsend	3	6^{3}

Semifinals
PR	(China) Xin Wang (China) S Zheng	3	6^{3}
3	(United States) C Gauff (New Zealand) E Routliffe	6	7^{7}

=== Bottom half ===
First round
8	(United States) C Dolehide (United States) D Krawczyk	6	6
(United States) S Stephens (Czech Republic) M Vondroušová	2	3
(Ukraine) A Kalinina (Ukraine) D Yastremska	6	6
Alt	E Alexandrova; Y Sizikova	0	3
WC	(Italy) A Moratelli (Italy) C Rosatello	6^{4}	6	[11]
(China) H Guo (China) X Jiang	7^{7}	4	[9]
(Mexico) G Olmos; A Panova	6	6^{3}	[10]
4	(Netherlands) D Schuurs (Brazil) L Stefani	4	7^{7}	[8]
6	(Ukraine) L Kichenok (Latvia) J Ostapenko	6	6
(Hungary) A Bondár (Spain) C Bucșa	1	0
(Canada) L Fernandez (Netherlands) A Rus	6	7
(Romania) M Niculescu (United States) A Parks	2	5
(Italy) L Bronzetti (Czech Republic) L Nosková	5	4
WC	(Italy) A Abbagnato (Italy) A Zantedeschi	7	6
(Italy) S Errani (Italy) J Paolini	5	7^{8}	[10]
2	(United States) N Melichar-Martinez (Australia) E Perez	7	6^{6}	[7]

Second round
8	(United States) C Dolehide (United States) D Krawczyk	6	6
(Ukraine) A Kalinina (Ukraine) D Yastremska	3	1
WC	(Italy) A Moratelli (Italy) C Rosatello	7	3	[7]
(Mexico) G Olmos; A Panova	5	6	[10]
6	(Ukraine) L Kichenok (Latvia) J Ostapenko	6	6
(Canada) L Fernandez (Netherlands) A Rus	1	2
WC	(Italy) A Abbagnato (Italy) A Zantedeschi	2	1
(Italy) S Errani (Italy) J Paolini	6	6

Quarterfinals
8	(United States) C Dolehide (United States) D Krawczyk	6	7
(Mexico) G Olmos; A Panova	3	5
6	(Ukraine) L Kichenok (Latvia) J Ostapenko	3	7	[5]
(Italy) S Errani (Italy) J Paolini	6	5	[10]

Semifinals
8	(United States) C Dolehide (United States) D Krawczyk	1	2
(Italy) S Errani (Italy) J Paolini	6	6

== Seeded teams ==
The following are the seeded teams, based on WTA rankings as of April 22, 2024.

Country	Player	Country	Player	Rank^{1}	Seed
TPE	Hsieh Su-wei	BEL	Elise Mertens	3	1
USA	Nicole Melichar-Martinez	AUS	Ellen Perez	14	2
USA	Coco Gauff	NZL	Erin Routliffe	22	3
NED	Demi Schuurs	BRA	Luisa Stefani	22	4
CZE	Kateřina Siniaková	USA	Taylor Townsend	24	5
UKR	Lyudmyla Kichenok	LAT	Jeļena Ostapenko	37	6
~~CZE~~	~~Barbora Krejčiková~~	~~GER~~	~~Laura Siegemund~~	~~38~~	~~7~~
USA	Caroline Dolehide	USA	Desirae Krawczyk	45	8
TPE	Chan Hao-ching		Veronika Kudermetova	69	9

== Other entry information ==
=== Wildcards ===
- (Italy) Anastasia Abbagnato / (Italy) Aurora Zantedeschi
- Anna Kalinskaya / Elena Vesnina
- (Italy) Angelica Moratelli / (Italy) Camilla Rosatello

=== Protected ranking ===
- (Japan) Shuko Aoyama / (Serbia) Aleksandra Krunić
- (China) Wang Xinyu / (China) Zheng Saisai

=== Alternates ===
- Ekaterina Alexandrova / Yana Sizikova
- (China) Wang Xiyu / (China) Yuan Yue

=== Withdrawals ===
- Anna Blinkova / Liudmila Samsonova → replaced by (China) Wang Xiyu / (China) Yuan Yue
- (Czech Republic) Barbora Krejčíková / (Germany) Laura Siegemund → replaced by Ekaterina Alexandrova / Yana Sizikova
