= 2023 Rolex Shanghai Masters – Doubles =

Doubles
- 2023 Rolex Shanghai Masters

Final
- Champions: (Spain) Marcel Granollers (Argentina) Horacio Zeballos
- Runners-up: (India) Rohan Bopanna (Australia) Matthew Ebden
- Score: 5–7, 6–2, [10–7]

Details
- Draw: 32 (3 WC )
- Seeds: 8

Events
Singles	Doubles
- Shanghai Masters

Marcel Granollers and Horacio Zeballos defeated Rohan Bopanna and Matthew Ebden in the final, 5–7, 6–2, [10–7] to win the doubles tennis title at the 2023 Shanghai Masters.

Mate Pavić and Bruno Soares were the reigning champions from when the event was last held in 2019, but Soares had since retired from professional tennis, and Pavić chose not to participate this year.

Austin Krajicek and Wesley Koolhof were in contention for the ATP No. 1 doubles ranking at the beginning of the tournament. Krajicek retained the top ranking after Koolhof lost in the quarterfinals.

== Seeds ==
1. (Croatia) Ivan Dodig / (United States) Austin Krajicek (first round)
2. (Netherlands) Wesley Koolhof / (United Kingdom) Neal Skupski (quarterfinals)
3. (United States) Rajeev Ram / (United Kingdom) Joe Salisbury (second round)
4. (India) Rohan Bopanna / (Australia) Matthew Ebden (final)
5. (Argentina) Máximo González / (Argentina) Andrés Molteni (quarterfinals)
6. (Mexico) Santiago González / (France) Édouard Roger-Vasselin (second round)
7. (Spain) Marcel Granollers / (Argentina) Horacio Zeballos (champions)
8. (El Salvador) Marcelo Arévalo / (Netherlands) Jean-Julien Rojer (quarterfinals)

== Draw ==
Key

- Q = Qualifier
- WC = Wild card
- LL = Lucky loser
- Alt = Alternate
- ITF = ITF entry
- PR = Protected ranking
- SR = Special ranking
- SE = Special exempt
- JE = Junior exempt
- JR = Junior Accelerator Programme entrant
- CO = College Accelerator Programme entrant
- NG = Next Gen Accelerator Program entrant
- w/o = Walkover
- r = Retired
- d = Defaulted

=== Finals ===
Semifinals
7	(Spain) Marcel Granollers (Argentina) Horacio Zeballos	6	6
(Australia) Rinky Hijikata (United Kingdom) Cameron Norrie	2	3
4	(India) Rohan Bopanna (Australia) Matthew Ebden	7^{7}	4	[10]
(France) Sadio Doumbia (France) Fabien Reboul	6^{0}	6	[2]

Final
7	(Spain) Marcel Granollers (Argentina) Horacio Zeballos	5	6	[10]
4	(India) Rohan Bopanna (Australia) Matthew Ebden	7	2	[7]

=== Top half ===
First round
1	(Croatia) I Dodig (United States) A Krajicek	7^{7}	1	[9]
(Australia) A de Minaur (Australia) M Purcell	6^{3}	6	[11]
(Netherlands) R Haase (Greece) S Tsitsipas	3	6	[10]
(United States) N Lammons (United States) J Withrow	6	3	[8]
(Austria) A Erler (Austria) L Miedler	6	6
(France) U Humbert (France) A Mannarino	2	2
(Belgium) S Gillé (Belgium) J Vliegen	6^{5}	6^{3}
7	(Spain) M Granollers (Argentina) H Zeballos	7^{7}	7^{7}
3	(United States) R Ram (United Kingdom) J Salisbury	6	6
Alt	(Australia) A Popyrin (Australia) A Vukic	4	4
(Poland) H Hurkacz (United States) B Shelton	5	7	[6]
(Australia) R Hijikata (United Kingdom) C Norrie	7	5	[10]
(Brazil) R Matos (Brazil) M Melo	4	6	[6]
(United Kingdom) J Murray (New Zealand) M Venus	6	1	[10]
(Monaco) H Nys (Poland) J Zieliński	4	4
5	(Argentina) M González (Argentina) A Molteni	6	6

Second round
(Australia) A de Minaur (Australia) M Purcell	5	6	[5]
(Netherlands) R Haase (Greece) S Tsitsipas	7	3	[10]
(Austria) A Erler (Austria) L Miedler	4	6^{3}
7	(Spain) M Granollers (Argentina) H Zeballos	6	7^{7}
3	(United States) R Ram (United Kingdom) J Salisbury	6	6^{4}	[9]
(Australia) R Hijikata (United Kingdom) C Norrie	4	7^{7}	[11]
(United Kingdom) J Murray (New Zealand) M Venus	2	4
5	(Argentina) M González (Argentina) A Molteni	6	6

Quarterfinals
(Netherlands) R Haase (Greece) S Tsitsipas	6^{2}	3
7	(Spain) M Granollers (Argentina) H Zeballos	7^{7}	6
(Australia) R Hijikata (United Kingdom) C Norrie	6	3	[10]
5	(Argentina) M González (Argentina) A Molteni	4	6	[8]

Semifinals
7	(Spain) M Granollers (Argentina) H Zeballos	6	6
(Australia) R Hijikata (United Kingdom) C Norrie	2	3

=== Bottom half ===
First round
8	(El Salvador) M Arévalo (Netherlands) J-J Rojer	6	7
(Canada) F Auger-Aliassime (Czech Republic) J Lehečka	4	5
(Germany) K Krawietz (Germany) T Pütz	6	4	[10]
(Croatia) N Mektić (Australia) J Peers	4	6	[5]
K Khachanov; A Rublev	w/o
(Argentina) F Cerúndolo (Argentina) TM Etcheverry
(Netherlands) M Middelkoop (Germany) A Mies	4	3
4	(India) R Bopanna (Australia) M Ebden	6	6
6	(Mexico) S González (France) É Roger-Vasselin	6^{2}	7^{12}	[10]
WC	(China) Z Li (China) F Sun	7^{7}	6^{10}	[5]
(United States) T Fritz (United States) S Korda	3	7^{7}	[4]
(France) S Doumbia (France) F Reboul	6	6^{5}	[10]
(United Kingdom) L Glasspool (Finland) H Heliövaara	4	4
WC	(Ecuador) G Escobar (Kazakhstan) A Nedovyesov	6	6
(United States) M McDonald (United States) F Tiafoe	7^{7}	1	[3]
2	(Netherlands) W Koolhof (United Kingdom) N Skupski	6^{3}	6	[10]

Second round
8	(El Salvador) M Arévalo (Netherlands) J-J Rojer	6^{6}	6	[10]
(Germany) K Krawietz (Germany) T Pütz	7^{8}	4	[7]
K Khachanov; A Rublev	6	3	[8]
4	(India) R Bopanna (Australia) M Ebden	4	6	[10]
6	(Mexico) S González (France) É Roger-Vasselin	7	6^{1}	[4]
(France) S Doumbia (France) F Reboul	5	7^{7}	[10]
WC	(Ecuador) G Escobar (Kazakhstan) A Nedovyesov	6^{2}	4
2	(Netherlands) W Koolhof (United Kingdom) N Skupski	7^{7}	6

Quarterfinals
8	(El Salvador) M Arévalo (Netherlands) J-J Rojer	4	2
4	(India) R Bopanna (Australia) M Ebden	6	6
(France) S Doumbia (France) F Reboul	7^{7}	6
2	(Netherlands) W Koolhof (United Kingdom) N Skupski	6^{5}	4

Semifinals
4	(India) R Bopanna (Australia) M Ebden	7^{7}	4	[10]
(France) S Doumbia (France) F Reboul	6^{0}	6	[2]
