= 2020 ATP Finals – Doubles =

Doubles
- 2020 ATP Finals

Final
- Champion: (Netherlands) Wesley Koolhof (Croatia) Nikola Mektić
- Runner-up: (Austria) Jürgen Melzer (France) Édouard Roger-Vasselin
- Score: 6–2, 3–6, [10–5]

Events
Singles	Doubles
- ATP Finals

Wesley Koolhof and Nikola Mektić defeated Jürgen Melzer and Édouard Roger-Vasselin in the final, 6–2, 3–6, [10–5] to win the doubles tennis title at the 2020 ATP Finals. It was their first ATP Tour title together.

Pierre-Hugues Herbert and Nicolas Mahut were the reigning champions, but did not qualify this year.

Mate Pavić and Bruno Soares clinched the year-end world No. 1 doubles team ranking after Rajeev Ram and Joe Salisbury lost to Melzer and Roger-Vasselin in the semifinals.

== Seeds ==
1. (Croatia) Mate Pavić / (Brazil) Bruno Soares (round robin)
2. (United States) Rajeev Ram / (United Kingdom) Joe Salisbury (semifinals)
3. (Germany) Kevin Krawietz / (Germany) Andreas Mies (round robin)
4. (Spain) Marcel Granollers / (Argentina) Horacio Zeballos (semifinals)
5. (Netherlands) Wesley Koolhof / (Croatia) Nikola Mektić (champions)
6. (Australia) John Peers / (New Zealand) Michael Venus (round robin)
7. (Austria) Jürgen Melzer / (France) Édouard Roger-Vasselin (final)
8. (Poland) Łukasz Kubot / (Brazil) Marcelo Melo (round robin)

== Alternates ==
1. (United Kingdom) Jamie Murray / (United Kingdom) Neal Skupski (Did not play)
2. (Australia) Max Purcell / (Australia) Luke Saville (Did not play)

== Draw ==
=== Finals ===
Semifinals
7	(Austria) Jürgen Melzer (France) Édouard Roger-Vasselin	6^{4}	6	[11]
2	(United States) Rajeev Ram (United Kingdom) Joe Salisbury	7^{7}	3	[9]
5	(Netherlands) Wesley Koolhof (Croatia) Nikola Mektić	6	6
4	(Spain) Marcel Granollers (Argentina) Horacio Zeballos	3	4

Final
7	(Austria) Jürgen Melzer (France) Édouard Roger-Vasselin	2	6	[5]
5	(Netherlands) Wesley Koolhof (Croatia) Nikola Mektić	6	3	[10]

=== Group Bob Bryan ===
		(Croatia) Pavić (Brazil) Soares	(Spain) Granollers (Argentina) Zeballos	(Australia) Peers (New Zealand) Venus	(Austria) Melzer (France) Roger-Vasselin	RR W–L	Set W–L	Game W–L	Standings
1	(Croatia) Mate Pavić (Brazil) Bruno Soares		6–7^{(4–7)}, 7–6^{(7–4)}, [8–10]	6–7^{(2–7)}, 6–3, [10–8]	6–7^{(6–8)}, 6–1, [10–4]	2–1	5–4 (55%)	39–32 (55%)	3
4	(Spain) Marcel Granollers (Argentina) Horacio Zeballos	7–6^{(7–4)}, 6–7^{(4–7)}, [10–8]		7–6^{(7–2)}, 7–5	6–6^{(0–1)} ret. (Note: Melzer/Roger-Vasselin's retirement victory over Granollers/Zeballos counted as a 2–0 set win.)	2–1	4–3 (57%)	34–30 (53%)	2
6	(Australia) John Peers (New Zealand) Michael Venus	7–6^{(7–2)}, 3–6, [8–10]	6–7^{(2–7)}, 5–7		6–2, 6–7^{(4–7)}, [10–12]	0–3	2–6 (25%)	33–37 (47%)	4
7	(Austria) Jürgen Melzer (France) Édouard Roger-Vasselin	7–6^{(8–6)}, 1–6, [4–10]	6–6^{(1–0)} ret.	2–6, 7–6^{(7–4)}, [12–10]		2–1	5–3 (63%)	24–31 (44%)	1

=== Group Mike Bryan ===
		(United States) Ram (United Kingdom) Salisbury	(Germany) Krawietz (Germany) Mies	(Netherlands) Koolhof (Croatia) Mektić	(Poland) Kubot (Brazil) Melo	RR W–L	Set W–L	Game W–L	Standings
2	(United States) Rajeev Ram (United Kingdom) Joe Salisbury		7–6^{(7–5)}, 6–7^{(4–7)}, [10–4]	6–7^{(5–7)}, 0–6	7–5, 3–6, [10–5]	2–1	4–4 (50%)	31–37 (46%)	2
3	(Germany) Kevin Krawietz (Germany) Andreas Mies	6–7^{(5–7)}, 7–6^{(7–4)}, [4–10]		7–6^{(7–3)}, 6–7^{(4–7)}, [7–10]	6–2, 7–6^{(7–5)}	1–2	4–4 (50%)	39–36 (52%)	3
5	(Netherlands) Wesley Koolhof (Croatia) Nikola Mektić	7–6^{(7–5)}, 6–0	6–7^{(3–7)}, 7–6^{(7–4)}, [10–7]		4–6, 7–6^{(7–2)}, [8–10]	2–1	5–3 (63%)	38–32 (54%)	1
8	(Poland) Łukasz Kubot (Brazil) Marcelo Melo	5–7, 6–3, [5–10]	2–6, 6–7^{(5–7)}	6–4, 6–7^{(2–7)}, [10–8]		1–2	3–5 (38%)	32–35 (48%)	4

Standings are determined by: 1. number of wins; 2. number of matches; 3. in two-players-ties, head-to-head records; 4. in three-players-ties, percentage of sets won, then percentage of games won, then head-to-head records; 5. ATP rankings.
