= 2019 BNP Paribas Open – Men's doubles =

Men's doubles
- 2019 BNP Paribas Open

Final
- Champions: (Croatia) Nikola Mektić (Argentina) Horacio Zeballos
- Runners-up: (Poland) Łukasz Kubot (Brazil) Marcelo Melo
- Score: 4–6, 6–4, [10–3]

Events
Singles	men	women
Doubles	men	women
← 2018 ·	BNP Paribas Open	· 2021 →

John Isner and Jack Sock were the defending champions, but Sock could not participate due to injury. Isner played alongside Sam Querrey, but lost in the first round to Pierre-Hugues Herbert and Nicolas Mahut.

Nikola Mektić and Horacio Zeballos won the title, defeating Łukasz Kubot and Marcelo Melo in the final, 4–6, 6–4, [10–3].

== Seeds ==
1. (France) Pierre-Hugues Herbert / (France) Nicolas Mahut (second round)
2. (United Kingdom) Jamie Murray / (Brazil) Bruno Soares (first round)
3. (Austria) Oliver Marach / (Croatia) Mate Pavić (semifinals)
4. (United States) Bob Bryan / (United States) Mike Bryan (second round)
5. (Colombia) Juan Sebastián Cabal / (Colombia) Robert Farah (quarterfinals)
6. (Poland) Łukasz Kubot / (Brazil) Marcelo Melo (final)
7. (South Africa) Raven Klaasen / (New Zealand) Michael Venus (quarterfinals)
8. (Finland) Henri Kontinen / (Australia) John Peers (second round)

== Draw ==
=== Key ===
- Q = Qualifier
- WC = Wild card
- LL = Lucky loser
- Alt = Alternate
- SE = Special exempt
- PR = Protected ranking
- ITF = ITF entry
- JE = Junior exempt
- w/o = Walkover
- r = Retired
- d = Defaulted
- SR = Special ranking

=== Finals ===
Semifinals
(Croatia) Nikola Mektić (Argentina) Horacio Zeballos	7^{7}	7^{7}
3	(Austria) Oliver Marach (Croatia) Mate Pavić	6^{3}	6^{3}
6	(Poland) Łukasz Kubot (Brazil) Marcelo Melo	7^{7}	2	[10]
(Serbia) Novak Djokovic (Italy) Fabio Fognini	6^{5}	6	[6]

Final
(Croatia) Nikola Mektić (Argentina) Horacio Zeballos	4	6	[10]
6	(Poland) Łukasz Kubot (Brazil) Marcelo Melo	6	4	[3]

=== Top half ===
First round
1	(France) P-H Herbert (France) N Mahut	6^{3}	6	[12]
(United States) J Isner (United States) S Querrey	7^{7}	4	[10]
(Croatia) N Mektić (Argentina) H Zeballos	7^{7}	6
(United Kingdom) K Edmund (United Kingdom) N Skupski	6^{1}	3
WC	(France) L Pouille (Switzerland) S Wawrinka	7^{7}	7^{7}
(Croatia) I Dodig (France) É Roger-Vasselin	6^{5}	6^{1}
(Germany) A Zverev (Germany) M Zverev	7	3	[5]
5	(Colombia) JS Cabal (Colombia) R Farah	5	6	[10]
3	(Austria) O Marach (Croatia) M Pavić	6	6
(Italy) M Cecchinato (Italy) A Seppi	4	0
Alt	(France) A Mannarino (France) G Monfils	6^{5}	3
WC	(United States) M McDonald (United States) R Opelka	7^{7}	6
(United States) R Ram (United Kingdom) J Salisbury	5	3
(Japan) B McLachlan (Germany) J-L Struff	7	6
(Argentina) M González (Japan) K Nishikori	3	5
7	(South Africa) R Klaasen (New Zealand) M Venus	6	7

Second round
1	(France) P-H Herbert (France) N Mahut	6	6^{7}	[11]
(Croatia) N Mektić (Argentina) H Zeballos	2	7^{9}	[13]
WC	(France) L Pouille (Switzerland) S Wawrinka	2	2
5	(Colombia) JS Cabal (Colombia) R Farah	6	6
3	(Austria) O Marach (Croatia) M Pavić	7^{8}	6
WC	(United States) M McDonald (United States) R Opelka	6^{6}	3
(Japan) B McLachlan (Germany) J-L Struff	4	6^{4}
7	(South Africa) R Klaasen (New Zealand) M Venus	6	7^{7}

Quarterfinals
(Croatia) N Mektić (Argentina) H Zeballos	3	7	[10]
5	(Colombia) JS Cabal (Colombia) R Farah	6	5	[6]
3	(Austria) O Marach (Croatia) M Pavić	6	6^{5}	[10]
7	(South Africa) R Klaasen (New Zealand) M Venus	4	7^{7}	[5]

Semifinals
(Croatia) N Mektić (Argentina) H Zeballos	7^{7}	7^{7}
3	(Austria) O Marach (Croatia) M Pavić	6^{3}	6^{3}

=== Bottom half ===
First round
6	(Poland) Ł Kubot (Brazil) M Melo	7^{7}	6^{1}	[10]
(Netherlands) W Koolhof (Greece) S Tsitsipas	6^{1}	7^{7}	[5]
(United States) S Johnson (Austria) D Thiem	5	1
WC	(United States) T Fritz (Australia) N Kyrgios	7	6
(Spain) F López (Argentina) D Schwartzman	7	4	[7]
(United Kingdom) D Inglot (Croatia) F Škugor	5	6	[10]
(Russia) K Khachanov (Russia) D Medvedev	3	2
4	(United States) B Bryan (United States) M Bryan	6	6
8	(Finland) H Kontinen (Australia) J Peers	6	6
(Georgia (country)) N Basilashvili (New Zealand) A Sitak	1	4
(Netherlands) J-J Rojer (Romania) H Tecău	6	6
(Hungary) M Fucsovics (Argentina) G Pella	1	2
(France) J Chardy (Canada) M Raonic	6^{5}	1
(Serbia) N Djokovic (Italy) F Fognini	7^{7}	6
(India) R Bopanna (Canada) D Shapovalov	6	6
2	(United Kingdom) J Murray (Brazil) B Soares	4	4

Second round
6	(Poland) Ł Kubot (Brazil) M Melo	6	1	[10]
WC	(United States) T Fritz (Australia) N Kyrgios	4	6	[8]
(United Kingdom) D Inglot (Croatia) F Škugor	3	6	[10]
4	(United States) B Bryan (United States) M Bryan	6	3	[3]
8	(Finland) H Kontinen (Australia) J Peers	3	6^{1}
(Netherlands) J-J Rojer (Romania) H Tecău	6	7^{7}
(Serbia) N Djokovic (Italy) F Fognini	6	1	[10]
(India) R Bopanna (Canada) D Shapovalov	4	6	[8]

Quarterfinals
6	(Poland) Ł Kubot (Brazil) M Melo	4	6	[10]
(United Kingdom) D Inglot (Croatia) F Škugor	6	2	[6]
(Netherlands) J-J Rojer (Romania) H Tecău	6^{6}	6	[6]
(Serbia) N Djokovic (Italy) F Fognini	7^{8}	2	[10]

Semifinals
6	(Poland) Ł Kubot (Brazil) M Melo	7^{7}	2	[10]
(Serbia) N Djokovic (Italy) F Fognini	6^{5}	6	[6]
