= 2021 Western & Southern Open – Men's doubles =

Men's doubles
- 2021 Western & Southern Open

Final
- Champions: (Spain) Marcel Granollers (Argentina) Horacio Zeballos
- Runners-up: (United States) Steve Johnson (United States) Austin Krajicek
- Score: 7–6^{(7–5)}, 7–6^{(7–5)}

Details
- Draw: 28 (3 WC )
- Seeds: 8

Events
Singles	men	women
Doubles	men	women
- Western & Southern Open

Pablo Carreño Busta and Alex de Minaur were the defending champions, but Carreño Busta chose not to defend his title and de Minaur played alongside Cameron Norrie instead. They lost in the quarterfinals to Marcel Granollers and Horacio Zeballos.

Granollers and Zeballos went on to win the title, defeating Steve Johnson and Austin Krajicek in the final, 7–6^{(7–5)}, 7–6^{(7–5)}.

== Seeds ==
The top four seeds received a bye into the second round.

1. (Croatia) Nikola Mektić / (Croatia) Mate Pavić (second round)
2. (Spain) Marcel Granollers / (Argentina) Horacio Zeballos (champions)
3. (Colombia) Juan Sebastián Cabal / (Colombia) Robert Farah (semifinals)
4. (United States) Rajeev Ram / (United Kingdom) Joe Salisbury (quarterfinals)
5. (Germany) Kevin Krawietz / (Romania) Horia Tecău (second round)
6. (Australia) John Peers / (Slovakia) Filip Polášek (second round)
7. (Poland) Łukasz Kubot / (Brazil) Marcelo Melo (first round)
8. (South Africa) Raven Klaasen / (Japan) Ben McLachlan (first round)

== Draw ==
Key

- Q = Qualifier
- WC = Wild card
- LL = Lucky loser
- Alt = Alternate
- ITF = ITF entry
- PR = Protected ranking
- SR = Special ranking
- SE = Special exempt
- JE = Junior exempt
- JR = Junior Accelerator Programme entrant
- CO = College Accelerator Programme entrant
- NG = Next Gen Accelerator Program entrant
- w/o = Walkover
- r = Retired
- d = Defaulted

=== Finals ===
Semifinals
WC	(United States) Steve Johnson (United States) Austin Krajicek	7^{7}	6^{8}	[10]
3	(Colombia) Juan Sebastián Cabal (Colombia) Robert Farah	6^{5}	7^{10}	[3]
Alt	(El Salvador) Marcelo Arévalo (Italy) Fabio Fognini	3	4
2	(Spain) Marcel Granollers (Argentina) Horacio Zeballos	6	6

Final
WC	(United States) Steve Johnson (United States) Austin Krajicek	6^{5}	6^{5}
2	(Spain) Marcel Granollers (Argentina) Horacio Zeballos	7^{7}	7^{7}

=== Top half ===
First round
(United Kingdom) D Evans (United Kingdom) N Skupski	3	6	[3]
(Poland) H Hurkacz (Italy) J Sinner	6	3	[10]
WC	(United States) S Johnson (United States) A Krajicek	7	7
(Canada) F Auger-Aliassime (New Zealand) M Daniell	5	5
(Uruguay) A Behar (Ecuador) G Escobar	4	6	[10]
8	(South Africa) R Klaasen (Japan) B McLachlan	6	3	[8]
(Serbia) F Krajinović (France) F Martin	1	6	[10]
(India) R Bopanna (Croatia) I Dodig	6	4	[7]
(Belgium) S Gillé (Belgium) J Vliegen	4	6^{3}
(Netherlands) W Koolhof (Germany) J-L Struff	6	7^{7}
(Germany) T Pütz (New Zealand) M Venus	6	6
7	(Poland) Ł Kubot (Brazil) M Melo	2	3

Second round
1	(Croatia) N Mektić (Croatia) M Pavić	7^{9}	5	[5]
(Poland) H Hurkacz (Italy) J Sinner	6^{7}	7	[10]
WC	(United States) S Johnson (United States) A Krajicek	6	6
(Uruguay) A Behar (Ecuador) G Escobar	3	4
3	(Colombia) JS Cabal (Colombia) R Farah	7^{7}	6
(Serbia) F Krajinović (France) F Martin	6^{3}	4
(Netherlands) W Koolhof (Germany) J-L Struff	5	3
(Germany) T Pütz (New Zealand) M Venus	7	6

Quarterfinals
(Poland) H Hurkacz (Italy) J Sinner	3	1
WC	(United States) S Johnson (United States) A Krajicek	6	6
3	(Colombia) JS Cabal (Colombia) R Farah	6	6
(Germany) T Pütz (New Zealand) M Venus	4	4

Semifinals
WC	(United States) S Johnson (United States) A Krajicek	7^{7}	6^{8}	[10]
3	(Colombia) JS Cabal (Colombia) R Farah	6^{5}	7^{10}	[3]

=== Bottom half ===
First round
5	(Germany) K Krawietz (Romania) H Tecău	7	6
(Argentina) F Delbonis (Argentina) D Schwartzman	5	3
Alt	(El Salvador) M Arévalo (Italy) F Fognini	7	6^{5}	[11]
Alt	(Russia) A Karatsev (Serbia) D Lajović	5	7^{7}	[9]
(Kazakhstan) A Golubev (Germany) A Mies	6^{5}	5
WC	(United States) N Monroe (United States) F Tiafoe	7^{7}	7
6	(Australia) J Peers (Slovakia) F Polášek	6^{4}	7^{7}	[10]
(Netherlands) M Middelkoop (Australia) L Saville	7^{7}	6^{2}	[6]
(Kazakhstan) A Bublik (Chile) C Garín	2	2
(Australia) A de Minaur (United Kingdom) C Norrie	6	6
(Italy) S Bolelli (Argentina) M González	7^{8}	3	[9]
(Russia) K Khachanov (Russia) A Rublev	6^{6}	6	[11]

Second round
5	(Germany) K Krawietz (Romania) H Tecău	6	5	[7]
Alt	(El Salvador) M Arévalo (Italy) F Fognini	3	7	[10]
WC	(United States) N Monroe (United States) F Tiafoe	6^{15}	2
4	(United States) R Ram (United Kingdom) J Salisbury	7^{17}	6
6	(Australia) J Peers (Slovakia) F Polášek	6	3	[8]
(Australia) A de Minaur (United Kingdom) C Norrie	3	6	[10]
(Russia) K Khachanov (Russia) A Rublev	6^{7}	5
2	(Spain) M Granollers (Argentina) H Zeballos	7^{9}	7

Quarterfinals
Alt	(El Salvador) M Arévalo (Italy) F Fognini	6	7^{7}
4	(United States) R Ram (United Kingdom) J Salisbury	4	6^{5}
(Australia) A de Minaur (United Kingdom) C Norrie	3	4
2	(Spain) M Granollers (Argentina) H Zeballos	6	6

Semifinals
Alt	(El Salvador) M Arévalo (Italy) F Fognini	3	4
2	(Spain) M Granollers (Argentina) H Zeballos	6	6
