= Nikola Mektić =

Croatian tennis player (born 1988)

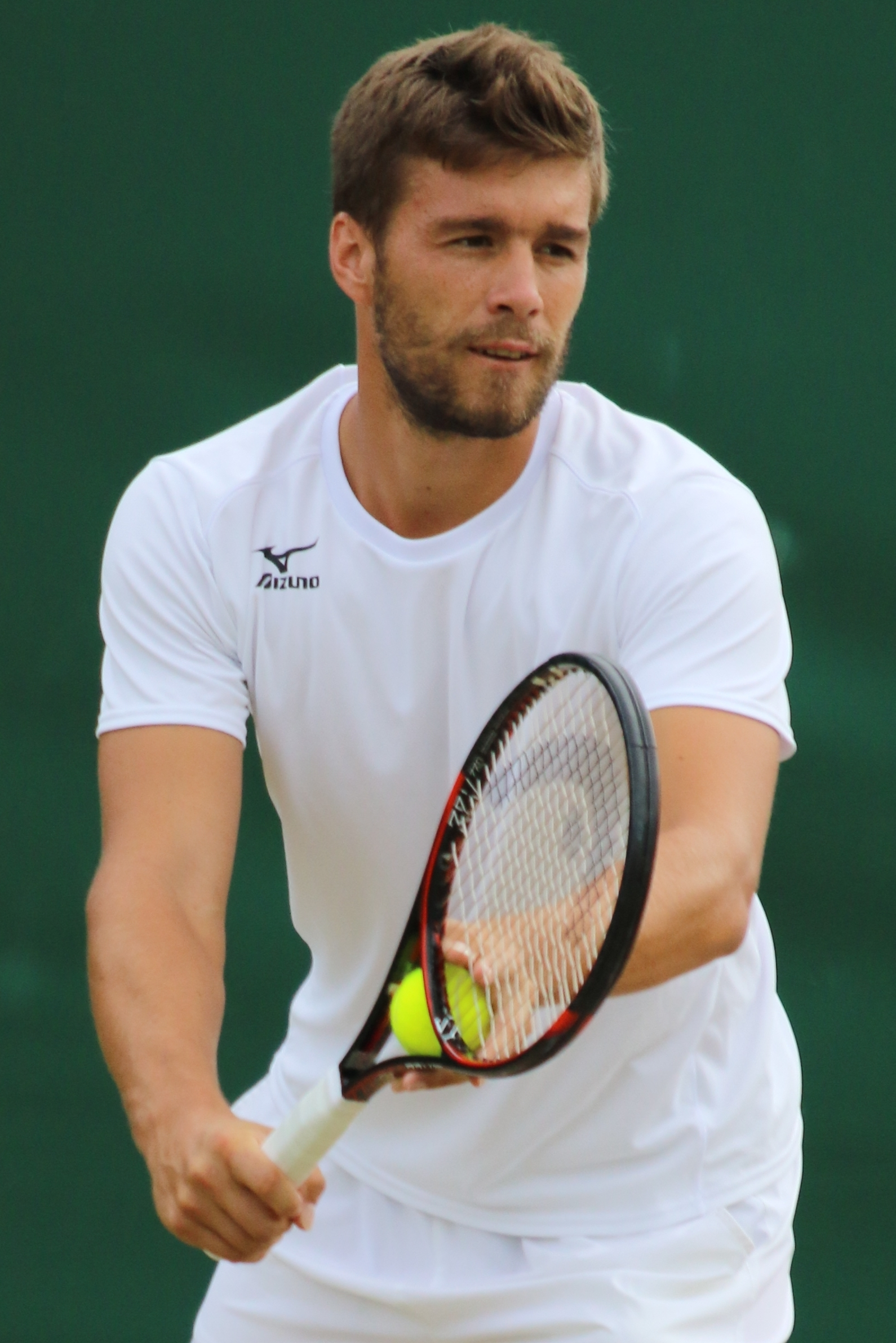
- Mektić in 2017
- Country (sports): Croatia
- Residence: Freeport, Bahamas
- Born: 24 December 1988 (age 37) Zagreb, SR Croatia, SFR Yugoslavia
- Height: 1.83 m (6 ft 0 in)
- Turned pro: 2006
- Plays: Right-handed (two-handed backhand)
- Coach: Goran Oresic
- Prize money: US $6,201,755

Singles
- Career record: 3–9
- Career titles: 0
- Highest ranking: No. 213 (6 May 2013)

Grand Slam singles results
- Australian Open: Q2 (2011)
- French Open: Q1 (2013)
- Wimbledon: Q3 (2011)
- US Open: Q2 (2010)

Doubles
- Career record: 356–204
- Career titles: 34
- Highest ranking: No. 1 (18 October 2021)
- Current ranking: No. 9 (18 August 2025)

Grand Slam doubles results
- Australian Open: SF (2021)
- French Open: SF (2018, 2020)
- Wimbledon: W (2021)
- US Open: F (2020)

Other doubles tournaments
- Tour Finals: W (2020)
- Olympic Games: W (2021)

Mixed doubles
- Career titles: 1

Grand Slam mixed doubles results
- Australian Open: W (2020)
- French Open: SF (2026)
- Wimbledon: 3R (2017, 2018, 2019)
- US Open: F (2018)
Medal record
Representing Croatia
Olympic Games
Gold medal – first place	2020 Tokyo	Men's Doubles
- Last updated on: 16 August 2025.

Nikola Mektić (born 24 December 1988) is a Croatian professional tennis player who is a former world No. 1 in doubles.

He is a two-time Grand Slam champion, having won the 2021 Wimbledon Championships in men's doubles partnering compatriot Mate Pavić, and the 2020 Australian Open with Barbora Krejčíková in mixed doubles. Mektić also finished runner-up at the 2020 US Open with Wesley Koolhof and at the 2022 Wimbledon Championships with Pavić in men's doubles, and the 2018 US Open with Alicja Rosolska in mixed doubles.

He became world No. 1 in men's doubles in October 2021, the second Croatian to reach this ranking. Mektić has won 34 doubles titles on the ATP Tour, including 10 at Masters 1000 level with five different partners. He also won the 2020 ATP Finals with Koolhof. In singles, he reached his highest ranking of world No. 213 in May 2013. Mektić was part of the Croatian team which won the 2018 Davis Cup, and won men's doubles gold at the 2020 Olympic Games alongside Pavić.

== Early and personal life ==
Mektić was born in Zagreb, Yugoslavia (now Croatia) in 1988 to Mirko and Višnja Mektić. He began playing tennis at age 6 after his elder brother Luka took up the sport.

== Career ==
After spending a better part of a decade on the ATP challenger tour and achieving a career high ranking of No. 213 in singles (on May 6, 2013), in 2016 Mektić decided to focus on doubles. The same year he reached his first ATP men's doubles final as a wildcard at the 2016 Croatia Open Umag with his compatriot Antonio Šančić.

=== 2018-2019: US Open mixed final, ATP 1000 doubles titles ===
In 2018 Mektic and Alexander Peya qualified for the 2018 ATP Finals in London. The same year Mektić reached his first Grand Slam finals (in mixed doubles) at the 2018 US Open, partnering Alicja Rosolska, and won the Davis Cup playing for Croatia. He also won three Masters 1000 with three different partners in Madrid (2018), Indian Wells (2019) and Monte Carlo (2019).

=== 2020: ATP Finals doubles title, Australian Open mixed title ===
2020 was the most successful year for Mektić in his career thus far. He won the 2020 ATP Finals in doubles partnering Wesley Koolhof and the 2020 Australian Open mixed doubles event partnering Barbora Krejčíková. He also reached the doubles final at the 2020 US Open partnering again with Wesley Koolhof. As a result, he finished the year at No. 8 in the top 10 rankings in doubles and No. 3 in the doubles race with his partner Wesley Koolhof.

=== 2021: Wimbledon, Olympics doubles champion, World No. 1 ===
Starting 2021, Mektić partnered successfully with his compatriot Mate Pavić. They won four ATP titles including the doubles title at the 2021 Miami Open in the beginning of April and reached the 2021 Australian Open doubles semifinals and 2021 Dubai Tennis Championships final in the first three months of the year. Following these results, Mektić returned to his No. 4 high-career ranking on April 5.

On April 18, Mektić clinched his fifth ATP Masters 1000 in a row and second Masters title of the year at the 2021 Monte-Carlo Masters where the pair defeated, for the second time in the final of a Masters in 2021, the British pair of Neal Skupski and Dan Evans.

Seeded No. 2 the pair also reached the final at the 2021 Mutua Madrid Open Masters where they lost to the No. 3 seeded pair Horacio Zeballos and Marcel Granollers and the final of the Italian Open where they won the title defeating No. 5 seeded pair Rajeev Ram and Joe Salisbury. After the win, Mektić moved to his career-high ranking of World No. 2 on 17 May 2021.

In their first Grand Slam doubles final, top seeds Mektić and Pavić had the biggest victory of their 2021 season as a team defeating Granollers and Zeballos to triumph in doubles at the 2021 Wimbledon Championships. They became the first Croatian players to win the Wimbledon men's doubles title. They are also the first players from their country to win at the All England Club since Goran Ivanisevic's 2001 victory in singles and Ivan Dodig's 2019 mixed doubles win with Latisha Chan.

At the Olympics he won the gold medal with Pavić in an all-Croatian final defeating Ivan Dodig and Marin Cilic. It was the country's first gold medal in the sport and the third time in the Olympics men's doubles' history that the same country won both gold and silver, and the first one since 1908.

On 18 October 2021, following a quarterfinal showing with Pavic at the 2021 BNP Paribas Open, Mektić became world No. 1 in doubles. He became only the second Croatian tennis player in history to be ranked No.1 in the World in doubles.

=== 2022: Italian Open title, Wimbledon finalist ===
The Croatian pair won their second Italian Open Masters crown and defended their 2021 title. At the 2022 Geneva Open the pair won their second title for the season.

At the ATP 500 2022 Queen's Club Championships Mektic won his third title for the season with Pavic and twentieth overall in his career. The pair also successfully defended their title at the 2022 Eastbourne International.

At the 2022 Wimbledon Championships the Croatian pair reached the semifinals in straight sets with a win over 11th seeds Kevin Krawietz and Andreas Mies and the final defeating six seeded Columbian pair of Robert Farah (tennis) and Juan-Sebastian Cabal in a five sets with a fifth set super tiebreak over 4 hours match.

The pair won another ATP 500 title at the 2022 Astana Open making it fifth for the season.

=== 2023: Third successive Eastbourne title ===
He won his 25th career and third straight title at the 2023 Eastbourne International with partner Mate Pavić.

=== 2024: 30th doubles title, back to top 10 ===
After reuniting with Wesley Koolhof for the 2024 season, he won his fourth ATP 500 title at the 2024 ABN AMRO Open in Rotterdam, his second at this tournament. Unseeded, he won the 2024 BNP Paribas Open with Wesley Koolhof defeating Marcel Granollers and Horacio Zeballos in the final. Also unseeded at the 2024 Rolex Shanghai Masters, they reached the semifinals defeating Nathaniel Lammons and Jackson Withrow and kept their position of No. 8 above their opponents in the ATP doubles race. Following reaching the final with a win over Santiago González and Édouard Roger-Vasselin, the duo Mektić and Koolhof climbed a position up to No. 7 in the ATP Live doubles race. They won their fourth title for the season defeating Argentinian duo of Máximo González and Andrés Molteni. It was Mektić's 29th title.

Mektić and Koolhof won their fifth title of the season at the Paris Masters, defeating Lloyd Glasspool and Adam Pavlásek in the final which went to a deciding champions tiebreak. It was Mektić's 30th doubles title and 10th Masters title.

=== 2025: Auckland doubles title ===
Partnering with Michael Venus, Mektić won the doubles title at the Auckland Classic, receiving a walkover in the final when scheduled opponents Christian Harrison and Rajeev Ram withdrew due to Ram suffering an arm injury.

At the 2025 Miami Open the pair reached the semifinals but lost to top seeds and world No. 1 players Marcelo Arevalo and Mate Pavić.

== Performance timeline ==
Key
W	F	SF	QF	#R	RR	Q#	P#	DNQ	A	Z#	PO	G	S	B	NMS	NTI	P	NH

(W) winner; (F) finalist; (SF) semifinalist; (QF) quarterfinalist; (#R) rounds 4, 3, 2, 1; (RR) round-robin stage; (Q#) qualification round; (P#) preliminary round; (DNQ) did not qualify; (A) absent; (Z#) Davis/Fed Cup Zonal Group (with number indication) or (PO) play-off; (G) gold, (S) silver or (B) bronze Olympic/Paralympic medal; (NMS) not a Masters tournament; (NTI) not a Tier I tournament; (P) postponed; (NH) not held; (SR) strike rate (events won / competed); (W–L) win–loss record.
To avoid confusion and double counting, these charts are updated at the conclusion of a tournament or when the player's participation has ended.

=== Doubles ===
Current through the 2025 Paris Masters.

Tournament	2016	2017	2018	2019	2020	2021	2022	2023	2024	2025	SR	W–L	Win%
Grand Slam tournaments
Australian Open	A	3R	2R	3R	2R	SF	2R	2R	3R	1R	0 / 9	14–9	61%
French Open	A	1R	SF	1R	SF	A	3R	1R	2R	2R	0 / 8	12–8	60%
Wimbledon	1R	SF	3R	3R	NH	W	F	3R	2R	2R	1 / 9	23–8	74%
US Open	A	1R	3R	2R	F	1R	QF	2R	QF	QF	0 / 9	17–9	65%
Win–loss	0–1	6–4	9–4	5–4	9–3	10–2	11–4	4–4	7–4	5–4	1 / 35	66–34	66%
Year-end championship
ATP Finals	Did not qualify		RR	DNQ	W	SF	F	DNQ	RR	DNQ	1 / 4	11–8	58%
ATP Masters 1000
Indian Wells Masters	A	1R	1R	W	NH	QF	1R	2R	W	1R	2 / 8	13–6	68%
Miami Open	A	QF	QF	2R	NH	W	2R	1R	2R	SF	1 / 8	15–7	68%
Monte-Carlo Masters	A	A	A	W	NH	W	QF	2R	2R	1R	2 / 6	11–4	73%
Madrid Open	A	A	W	2R	NH	F	2R	2R	A	QF	1 / 6	12–5	71%
Italian Open	A	2R	1R	2R	2R	W	W	1R	QF	1R	2 / 9	15–7	68%
Canadian Open	A	1R	SF	1R	NH	F	2R	1R	2R	2R	0 / 8	9–8	53%
Cincinnati Masters	A	1R	QF	1R	QF	2R	2R	QF	2R	W	1 / 9	13–7	65%
Shanghai Masters	A	1R	QF	1R	NH			1R	W	QF	1 / 6	8–5	62%
Paris Masters	A	1R	2R	1R	QF	2R	A	A	W	2R	1 / 7	6–6	50%
Win–loss	0–0	3–7	14–6	13–7	4–3	22–5	9-6	4–8	19–5	14–8	11 / 67	102–55	65%
National representation
Davis Cup	A	1R	W	RR	F		SF	RR	A	Q2	1 / 6	11–4	73%
Summer Olympics	A	Not Held				G	Not Held		1R	NH	1 / 2	5–1	83%
Career statistics
	2016	2017	2018	2019	2020	2021	2022	2023	2024	2025	Career		
Tournaments	5	28	28	28	13	19	24	29	26	26	Career total: 226		
Titles	0	2	2	3	1	9	5	3	5	2	Career total: 32		
Finals	1	3	5	4	3	12	9	4	7	3	Career total: 51		
Overall win–loss	4–5	34–26	45–26	34–26	26–14	65–13	38-15	27–26	45–21	32–24	32 / 226	363–209	63%
Year-end ranking	74	32	13	15	8	2	8	43	6	19	$6,323,106		

=== Mixed doubles ===
Tournament	2017	2018	2019	2020	2021	2022	2023	2024	2025	SR	W–L
Australian Open	A	A	1R	W	1R	A	2R	A	A	1 / 4	6–3
French Open	1R	2R	QF	NH	A	A	A	A	1R	0 / 4	3–4
Wimbledon	3R	3R	3R	NH	A	A	2R	A	1R	0 / 5	5–5
US Open	2R	F	1R	NH	A	1R	A	A	A	0 / 4	5–4
Win–loss	3–3	6–3	3–4	5–0	0–1	0–1	2–2	0–0	0–2	1 / 17	19–16

== Grand Slam tournament finals ==
=== Doubles: 3 (1 title, 2 runner-ups) ===
Result	Year	Tournament	Surface	Partner	Opponents	Score
Loss	2020	US Open	Hard	(Netherlands) Wesley Koolhof	(Croatia) Mate Pavić (Brazil) Bruno Soares	5–7, 3–6
Win	2021	Wimbledon	Grass	(Croatia) Mate Pavić	(Spain) Marcel Granollers (Argentina) Horacio Zeballos	6–4, 7–6^{(7–5)}, 2–6, 7–5
Loss	2022	Wimbledon	Grass	(Croatia) Mate Pavić	(Australia) Matthew Ebden (Australia) Max Purcell	6–7^{(5–7)}, 7–6^{(7–3)}, 6–4, 4–6, 6–7^{(2–10)}

=== Mixed doubles: 2 (1 title, 1 runner-up) ===
Result	Year	Tournament	Surface	Partner	Opponents	Score
Loss	2018	US Open	Hard	(Poland) Alicja Rosolska	(United States) Bethanie Mattek-Sands (United Kingdom) Jamie Murray	6–2, 3–6, [9–11]
Win	2020	Australian Open	Hard	(Czech Republic) Barbora Krejčíková	(United States) Bethanie Mattek-Sands (United Kingdom) Jamie Murray	5–7, 6–4, [10–1]

== Other significant finals ==
=== Olympic finals ===
==== Doubles: 1 (1 Gold medal) ====
Result	Year	Tournament	Surface	Partner	Opponents	Score
Gold	2021	Summer Olympics	Hard	(Croatia) Mate Pavić	(Croatia) Marin Čilić (Croatia) Ivan Dodig	6–4, 3–6, [10–6]

=== Year-end championships ===
==== Doubles: 2 (1 title, 1 runner-up) ====
Result	Year	Tournament	Surface	Partner	Opponents	Score
Win	2020	ATP Finals, London	Hard (i)	(Netherlands) Wesley Koolhof	(Austria) Jürgen Melzer (France) Édouard Roger-Vasselin	6–2, 3–6, [10–5]
Loss	2022	ATP Finals, Turin	Hard (i)	(Croatia) Mate Pavić	(United States) Rajeev Ram (United Kingdom) Joe Salisbury	6–7^{(4–7)}, 4–6

=== Masters 1000 finals ===
==== Doubles: 13 (11 titles, 2 runner-ups) ====
Result	Year	Tournament	Surface	Partner	Opponents	Score
Win	2018	Madrid Open	Clay	(Austria) Alexander Peya	(United States) Bob Bryan (United States) Mike Bryan	5–3 ret.
Win	2019	Indian Wells Masters	Hard	(Argentina) Horacio Zeballos	(Poland) Łukasz Kubot (Brazil) Marcelo Melo	4–6, 6–4, [10–3]
Win	2019	Monte-Carlo Masters	Clay	(Croatia) Franko Škugor	(Netherlands) Robin Haase (Netherlands) Wesley Koolhof	6–7^{(3–7)}, 7–6^{(7–3)}, [11–9]
Win	2021	Miami Open	Hard	(Croatia) Mate Pavić	(United Kingdom) Dan Evans (United Kingdom) Neal Skupski	6–4, 6–4
Win	2021	Monte-Carlo Masters (2)	Clay	(Croatia) Mate Pavić	(United Kingdom) Dan Evans (United Kingdom) Neal Skupski	6–3, 4–6, [10–7]
Loss	2021	Madrid Open	Clay	(Croatia) Mate Pavić	(Spain) Marcel Granollers (Argentina) Horacio Zeballos	6–1, 3–6, [8–10]
Win	2021	Italian Open	Clay	(Croatia) Mate Pavić	(United States) Rajeev Ram (United Kingdom) Joe Salisbury	6–4, 7–6^{(7–4)}
Loss	2021	Canadian Open	Hard	(Croatia) Mate Pavić	(United States) Rajeev Ram (United Kingdom) Joe Salisbury	3–6, 6–4, [3–10]
Win	2022	Italian Open (2)	Clay	(Croatia) Mate Pavić	(United States) John Isner (Argentina) Diego Schwartzman	6–2, 6–7^{(6–8)}, [12–10]
Win	2024	Indian Wells Masters (2)	Hard	(Netherlands) Wesley Koolhof	(Spain) Marcel Granollers (Argentina) Horacio Zeballos	7–6^{(7–2)}, 7–6^{(7–4)}
Win	2024	Shanghai Masters	Hard	(Netherlands) Wesley Koolhof	(Argentina) Máximo González (Argentina) Andrés Molteni	6–4, 6–4
Win	2024	Paris Masters	Hard (i)	(Netherlands) Wesley Koolhof	(United Kingdom) Lloyd Glasspool (Czech Republic) Adam Pavlásek	3–6, 6–3, [10–5]
Win	2025	Cincinnati Open	Hard	(United States) Rajeev Ram	(Italy) Lorenzo Musetti (Italy) Lorenzo Sonego	4–6, 6–3, [10–5]

== ATP Tour finals ==
=== Doubles: 56 (34 titles, 22 runner-ups) ===
Legend Grand Slam (1–2) ATP Finals (1–1) ATP Masters 1000 (11–2) Summer Olympics (1–0) ATP 500 Series (5–7) ATP 250 Series (15–10)	Finals by surface Hard (20–14) Clay (8–5) Grass (6–3)	Finals by setting Outdoor (28–16) Indoor (6–6)

Result	W–L	Date	Tournament	Tier	Surface	Partner	Opponents	Score
Loss	0–1	Jul 2016	Croatia Open, Croatia	250 Series	Clay	(Croatia) Antonio Šančić	(Slovakia) Martin Kližan (Spain) David Marrero	4–6, 2–6
Win	1–1	Feb 2017	Memphis Open, United States	250 Series	Hard (i)	(United States) Brian Baker	(United States) Ryan Harrison (United States) Steve Johnson	6–3, 6–4
Win	2–1	Apr 2017	Hungarian Open, Hungary	250 Series	Clay	(United States) Brian Baker	(Colombia) Juan Sebastián Cabal (Colombia) Robert Farah	7–6^{(7–2)}, 6–4
Loss	2–2	Oct 2017	Shenzhen Open, China	250 Series	Hard	(United States) Nicholas Monroe	(Austria) Alexander Peya (United States) Rajeev Ram	3–6, 2–6
Loss	2–3	Feb 2018	Sofia Open, Bulgaria	250 Series	Hard (i)	(Austria) Alexander Peya	(Netherlands) Robin Haase (Netherlands) Matwé Middelkoop	7–5, 4–6, [4–10]
Loss	2–4	Feb 2018	Rio Open, Brazil	500 Series	Clay	(Austria) Alexander Peya	(Spain) David Marrero (Spain) Fernando Verdasco	7–5, 5–7, [8–10]
Win	3–4	Apr 2018	Grand Prix Hassan II, Morocco	250 Series	Clay	(Austria) Alexander Peya	(France) Benoît Paire (France) Édouard Roger-Vasselin	7–5, 3–6, [10–7]
Loss	3–5	May 2018	Bavarian Championships, Germany	250 Series	Clay	(Austria) Alexander Peya	(Croatia) Ivan Dodig (United States) Rajeev Ram	3–6, 5–7
Win	4–5	May 2018	Madrid Open, Spain	Masters 1000	Clay	(Austria) Alexander Peya	(United States) Bob Bryan (United States) Mike Bryan	5–3, ret.
Win	5–5	Feb 2019	Sofia Open, Bulgaria	250 Series	Hard (i)	(Austria) Jürgen Melzer	(Chinese Taipei) Hsieh Cheng-peng (Indonesia) Christopher Rungkat	6–2, 4–6, [10–2]
Win	6–5	Mar 2019	Indian Wells Masters, United States	Masters 1000	Hard	(Argentina) Horacio Zeballos	(Poland) Łukasz Kubot (Brazil) Marcelo Melo	4–6, 6–4, [10–3]
Win	7–5	Apr 2019	Monte-Carlo Masters, Monaco	Masters 1000	Clay	(Croatia) Franko Škugor	(Netherlands) Robin Haase (Netherlands) Wesley Koolhof	6–7^{(3–7)}, 7–6^{(7–3)}, [11–9]
Loss	7–6	Oct 2019	Japan Open, Japan	500 Series	Hard	(Croatia) Franko Škugor	(France) Nicolas Mahut (France) Édouard Roger-Vasselin	6–7^{(7–9)}, 4–6
Loss	7–7	Feb 2020	Open 13, France	250 Series	Hard (i)	(Netherlands) Wesley Koolhof	(France) Nicolas Mahut (Canada) Vasek Pospisil	3–6, 4–6
Loss	7–8	Sep 2020	US Open, United States	Grand Slam	Hard	(Netherlands) Wesley Koolhof	(Croatia) Mate Pavić (Brazil) Bruno Soares	5–7, 3–6
Win	8–8	Nov 2020	ATP Finals, United Kingdom	Tour Finals	Hard (i)	(Netherlands) Wesley Koolhof	(Austria) Jürgen Melzer (France) Édouard Roger-Vasselin	6–2, 3–6, [10–5]
Win	9–8	Jan 2021	Antalya Open, Turkey	250 Series	Hard	(Croatia) Mate Pavić	(Croatia) Ivan Dodig (Slovakia) Filip Polášek	6–2, 6–4
Win	10–8	Feb 2021	Murray River Open, Australia	250 Series	Hard	(Croatia) Mate Pavić	(France) Jérémy Chardy (France) Fabrice Martin	7–6^{(7–2)}, 6–3
Win	11–8	Mar 2021	Rotterdam Open, Netherlands	500 Series	Hard (i)	(Croatia) Mate Pavić	(Germany) Kevin Krawietz (Romania) Horia Tecău	7–6^{(9–7)}, 6–2
Loss	11–9	Mar 2021	Dubai Tennis Championships, United Arab Emirates	500 Series	Hard	(Croatia) Mate Pavić	(Colombia) Juan Sebastián Cabal (Colombia) Robert Farah	6–7^{(0–7)}, 6–7^{(4–7)}
Win	12–9	Apr 2021	Miami Open, United States	Masters 1000	Hard	(Croatia) Mate Pavić	(United Kingdom) Dan Evans (United Kingdom) Neal Skupski	6–4, 6–4
Win	13–9	Apr 2021	Monte-Carlo Masters, Monaco (2)	Masters 1000	Clay	(Croatia) Mate Pavić	(United Kingdom) Dan Evans (United Kingdom) Neal Skupski	6–3, 4–6, [10–7]
Loss	13–10	May 2021	Madrid Open, Spain	Masters 1000	Clay	(Croatia) Mate Pavić	(Spain) Marcel Granollers (Argentina) Horacio Zeballos	6–1, 3–6, [8–10]
Win	14–10	May 2021	Italian Open, Italy	Masters 1000	Clay	(Croatia) Mate Pavić	(United States) Rajeev Ram (United Kingdom) Joe Salisbury	6–4, 7–6^{(7–4)}
Win	15–10	Jun 2021	Eastbourne International, United Kingdom	250 Series	Grass	(Croatia) Mate Pavić	(United States) Rajeev Ram (United Kingdom) Joe Salisbury	6–4, 6–3
Win	16–10	Jul 2021	Wimbledon Championships, United Kingdom	Grand Slam	Grass	(Croatia) Mate Pavić	(Spain) Marcel Granollers (Argentina) Horacio Zeballos	6–4, 7–6^{(7–5)}, 2–6, 7–5
Win	17–10	Jul 2021	Olympic Games, Japan	Olympics	Hard	(Croatia) Mate Pavić	(Croatia) Ivan Dodig (Croatia) Marin Čilić	6–4, 3–6, [10–6]
Loss	17–11	Aug 2021	Canadian Open, Canada	Masters 1000	Hard	(Croatia) Mate Pavić	(United States) Rajeev Ram (United Kingdom) Joe Salisbury	3–6, 6–4, [3–10]
Loss	17–12	Feb 2022	Dubai Tennis Championships, United Arab Emirates	500 Series	Hard	(Croatia) Mate Pavić	(Germany) Tim Pütz (New Zealand) Michael Venus	3–6, 7–6^{(7–5)}, [14–16]
Loss	17–13	Apr 2022	Serbia Open, Serbia	250 Series	Clay	(Croatia) Mate Pavić	(Uruguay) Ariel Behar (Ecuador) Gonzalo Escobar	2–6, 6–3, [7–10]
Win	18–13	May 2022	Italian Open, Italy (2)	Masters 1000	Clay	(Croatia) Mate Pavić	(United States) John Isner (Argentina) Diego Schwartzman	6–2, 6–7^{(6–8)}, [12–10]
Win	19–13	May 2022	Geneva Open, Switzerland	250 Series	Clay	(Croatia) Mate Pavić	(Netherlands) Matwé Middelkoop (Spain) Pablo Andújar	2–6, 6–2, [10–3]
Win	20–13	Jun 2022	Queen's Club Championships, United Kingdom	500 Series	Grass	(Croatia) Mate Pavić	(United Kingdom) Lloyd Glasspool (Finland) Harri Heliövaara	3–6, 7–6^{(7–3)}, [10–6]
Win	21–13	Jun 2022	Eastbourne International, United Kingdom (2)	250 Series	Grass	(Croatia) Mate Pavić	(Netherlands) Matwé Middelkoop (Australia) Luke Saville	6–4, 6–2
Loss	21–14	Jul 2022	Wimbledon Championships, United Kingdom	Grand Slam	Grass	(Croatia) Mate Pavić	(Australia) Matthew Ebden (Australia) Max Purcell	6–7^{(5–7)}, 7–6^{(7–3)}, 6–4, 4–6, 6–7^{(2–10)}
Win	22–14	Oct 2022	Astana Open, Kazakhstan	500 Series	Hard (i)	(Croatia) Mate Pavić	(France) Adrian Mannarino (France) Fabrice Martin	6–4, 6–2
Loss	22–15	Nov 2022	ATP Finals, Italy	Tour Finals	Hard (i)	(Croatia) Mate Pavić	(United States) Rajeev Ram (United Kingdom) Joe Salisbury	6–7^{(4–7)}, 4–6
Win	23–15	Jan 2023	Auckland Open, New Zealand	250 Series	Hard	(Croatia) Mate Pavić	(United States) Nathaniel Lammons (United States) Jackson Withrow	6–4, 6–7^{(5–7)}, [10–6]
Win	24–15	Jun 2023	Stuttgart Open, Germany	250 Series	Grass	(Croatia) Mate Pavić	(Germany) Kevin Krawietz (Germany) Tim Pütz	7–6^{(7–2)}, 6–3
Win	25–15	Jun 2023	Eastbourne International, United Kingdom (3)	250 Series	Grass	(Croatia) Mate Pavić	(Croatia) Ivan Dodig (United States) Austin Krajicek	6–4, 6–2
Loss	25–16	Nov 2023	Sofia Open, Bulgaria	250 Series	Hard (i)	(United Kingdom) Julian Cash	(Ecuador) Gonzalo Escobar (Kazakhstan) Aleksandr Nedovyesov	3–6, 6–3, [11–13]
Win	26–16	Jan 2024	Auckland Open, New Zealand (2)	250 Series	Hard	(Netherlands) Wesley Koolhof	(Spain) Marcel Granollers (Argentina) Horacio Zeballos	6–3, 6–7^{(5–7)}, [10–7]
Win	27–16	Feb 2024	Rotterdam Open, Netherlands (2)	500 Series	Hard (i)	(Netherlands) Wesley Koolhof	(Netherlands) Robin Haase (Netherlands) Botic van de Zandschulp	6–3, 7–5
Win	28–16	Mar 2024	Indian Wells Masters, United States (2)	Masters 1000	Hard	(Netherlands) Wesley Koolhof	(Spain) Marcel Granollers (Argentina) Horacio Zeballos	7–6^{(7–2)}, 7–6^{(7–4)}
Loss	28–17	Jun 2024	Rosmalen Championships, Netherlands	250 Series	Grass	(Netherlands) Wesley Koolhof	(United States) Nathaniel Lammons (United States) Jackson Withrow	6–7^{(5–7)}, 6–7^{(3–7)}
Win	29–17	Oct 2024	Shanghai Masters, China	Masters 1000	Hard	(Netherlands) Wesley Koolhof	(Argentina) Máximo González (Argentina) Andrés Molteni	6–4, 6–4
Loss	29–18	Oct 2024	Swiss Indoors, Switzerland	500 Series	Hard (i)	(Netherlands) Wesley Koolhof	(United Kingdom) Jamie Murray (Australia) John Peers	3–6, 5–7
Win	30–18	Nov 2024	Paris Masters, France	Masters 1000	Hard (i)	(Netherlands) Wesley Koolhof	(United Kingdom) Lloyd Glasspool (Czech Republic) Adam Pavlásek	3–6, 6–3, [10–5]
Win	31–18	Jan 2025	Auckland Open, New Zealand (3)	250 Series	Hard	(New Zealand) Michael Venus	(United States) Christian Harrison (United States) Rajeev Ram	Walkover
Loss	31–19	Jun 2025	Queen's Club Championships, United Kingdom	500 Series	Grass	(New Zealand) Michael Venus	(United Kingdom) Julian Cash (United Kingdom) Lloyd Glasspool	3–6, 7–6^{(7–5)}, [6–10]
Win	32–19	Aug 2025	Cincinnati Open, United States	Masters 1000	Hard	(United States) Rajeev Ram	(Italy) Lorenzo Musetti (Italy) Lorenzo Sonego	4–6, 6–3, [10–5]
Win	33–19	Feb 2026	Delray Beach Open, United States	250 Series	Hard	(United States) Austin Krajicek	(United States) Benjamin Kittay (United States) Ryan Seggerman	6–7^{(3–7)}, 6–3, [11–9]
Loss	33–20	Aug 2026	Washington Open, United States	500 Series	Hard	(United States) Austin Krajicek	(United Kingdom) Julian Cash (United Kingdom) Lloyd Glasspool	3–6, 4–6
Loss	33–21	Aug 2026	Winston-Salem Open, United States	250 Series	Hard	(United States) Austin Krajicek	(Czech Republic) Petr Nouza (Austria) Neil Oberleitner	5–7, 4–6
Win	34–21	Oct 2026	Japan Open, Japan	500 Series	Hard	(United States) Austin Krajicek	(France) Théo Arribagé (France) Albano Olivetti	7–6^{(7–5)}, 5–7, [10–6]
Loss	34–22	Nov 2026	Stockholm Open, Sweden	250 Series	Hard (i)	(France) Édouard Roger-Vasselin	(Sweden) Erik Grevelius (Sweden) Adam Heinonen	3–6, 4–6

== ATP Challenger and ITF Tour titles ==
=== Singles (15) ===
Legend
ATP Challengers (0)
ITF Futures (15)

No.	Date	Tournament	Surface	Opponent	Score
1.	25 May 2008	Brčko, Bosnia and Herzegovina	Clay	(Germany) Dennis Blömke	6–2, 6–3
2.	10 May 2009	Doboj, Bosnia and Herzegovina	Clay	(Serbia) Ivan Bjelica	7–6, 4–6, 6–3
3.	31 May 2009	Brčko, Bosnia and Herzegovina	Clay	(Serbia) Aleksander Slović	7–6, 7–5
4.	23 August 2009	Vinkovci, Croatia	Clay	(Bosnia and Herzegovina) Ismar Gorčić	7–6, 7–6
5.	30 August 2009	Čakovec, Croatia	Clay	(Hungary) Attila Balázs	6–3, 7–5
6.	6 September 2009	Osijek, Croatia	Clay	(Bosnia and Herzegovina) Aldin Šetkić	2–6, 6–4, 6–2
7.	6 June 2010	Rogaška Slatina, Slovenia	Clay	(Ukraine) Denys Molchanov	6–3, 4–2 ret.
8.	18 July 2010	Fano, Italy	Clay	(Italy) Stefano Ianni	6–2, 6–0
9.	27 February 2011	Zagreb, Croatia	Clay	(Switzerland) Michael Lammer	7–6, ret.
10.	27 May 2012	Prijedor, Bosnia and Herzegovina	Clay	(Croatia) Marin Bradarić	5–7, 7–5, 6–0
11.	3 June 2012	Bled, Slovenia	Clay	(Germany) Marcel Zimmermann	1–6, 6–2, 6–4
12.	29 September 2013	Sokobanja, Serbia	Clay	(Austria) Marc Rath	6–6, 5–2, ret.
13.	13 October 2013	Solin, Croatia	Clay	(Croatia) Mate Delić	7–6, 7–6
14.	2 March 2014	Trento, Italy	Carpet	(Czech Republic) Roman Jebavý	6–3, 5–7, 6–1
15.	26 October 2014	Jablonec nad Nisou, Czech Republic	Carpet	(Czech Republic) Jan Hernych	6–4, 6–4

=== Doubles (15) ===
Challengers (9)
Futures (6)
