= 2021 Monte-Carlo Masters – Doubles =

Doubles
- 2021 Monte-Carlo Masters

Final
- Champions: (Croatia) Nikola Mektić; (Croatia) Mate Pavić
- Runners-up: (United Kingdom) Dan Evans; (United Kingdom) Neal Skupski
- Score: 6–3, 4–6, [10–7]

Events
| Singles | Doubles |
- Monte-Carlo Masters

Defending champion Nikola Mektić and his partner, Mate Pavić, defeated Dan Evans and Neal Skupski in the final, 6–3, 4–6, [10–7], to win the doubles tennis title at the 2021 Monte-Carlo Masters. It was the all-Croatian duo's second consecutive ATP Tour Masters 1000 title together and their fifth title overall of the year. The win also earned Mektić his first successful career title defense. The match was the second successive encounter between both teams in consecutive Masters 1000 finals.

Mektić won the tournament when it was last held in 2019 with Franko Škugor, but Škugor did not return to compete.

Pavić and Robert Farah were in contention for the ATP No. 1 doubles ranking at the start of the tournament. After Farah lost in the semifinals, Pavić retained the top ranking by reaching the final.

== Seeds ==
1. (Colombia) Juan Sebastián Cabal / (Colombia) Robert Farah (semifinals)
2. (Croatia) Nikola Mektić / (Croatia) Mate Pavić (champions)
3. (Croatia) Ivan Dodig / (Slovakia) Filip Polášek (second round)
4. (Spain) Marcel Granollers / (Argentina) Horacio Zeballos (semifinals)
5. (United States) Rajeev Ram / (United Kingdom) Joe Salisbury (second round)
6. (Netherlands) Wesley Koolhof / (Poland) Łukasz Kubot (second round)
7. (France) Pierre-Hugues Herbert / (France) Nicolas Mahut (quarterfinals)
8. (Germany) Kevin Krawietz / (Romania) Horia Tecău (first round)

== Draw ==
Key

- Q = Qualifier
- WC = Wild card
- LL = Lucky loser
- Alt = Alternate
- ITF = ITF entry
- PR = Protected ranking
- SR = Special ranking
- SE = Special exempt
- JE = Junior exempt
- JR = Junior Accelerator Programme entrant
- CO = College Accelerator Programme entrant
- NG = Next Gen Accelerator Program entrant
- w/o = Walkover
- r = Retired
- d = Defaulted

=== Finals ===
Semifinals

Final

1
- (Colombia) Juan Sebastián Cabal
- (Colombia) Robert Farah
6^{0}
6
[4]

(United Kingdom) Dan Evans
(United Kingdom) Neal Skupski
7^{7}
2
[10]

- (United Kingdom) Dan Evans
- (United Kingdom) Neal Skupski
3
6
[7]

2
- (Croatia) Nikola Mektić
- (Croatia) Mate Pavić
6
4
[10]

4
- (Spain) Marcel Granollers
- (Argentina) Horacio Zeballos
6
5
[4]

2
(Croatia) Nikola Mektić
(Croatia) Mate Pavić
3
7
[10]

=== Top half ===
First round

Second round

Quarterfinals

Semifinals

1
(Colombia) JS Cabal
(Colombia) R Farah
6
6

(Canada) F Auger-Aliassime
(Poland) H Hurkacz
5

- (Canada) F Auger-Aliassime
- (Poland) H Hurkacz
0
2

WC
- (Monaco) R Arneodo
- (Monaco) H Nys
2^{r}

1
(Colombia) JS Cabal
(Colombia) R Farah
7^{7}
7

(Italy) F Fognini
(Argentina) D Schwartzman
6
7

- (Italy) F Fognini
- (Argentina) D Schwartzman
6^{5}
5

- (Austria) O Marach
- (Australia) L Saville
4
5

(Italy) F Fognini
(Argentina) D Schwartzman
1
6
[10]

- (France) A Mannarino
- (France) B Paire
6^{2}
3

6
- (Netherlands) W Koolhof
- (Poland) Ł Kubot
6
4
[7]

6
(Netherlands) W Koolhof
(Poland) Ł Kubot
7^{7}
6

1
- (Colombia) JS Cabal
- (Colombia) R Farah
6^{0}
6
[4]

(United Kingdom) D Evans
(United Kingdom) N Skupski
7^{7}
2
[10]

3
- (Croatia) I Dodig
- (Slovakia) F Polášek
6
6^{5}
[11]

- (Belgium) S Gillé
- (Belgium) J Vliegen
6^{5}
6
[8]

(United Kingdom) D Evans
(United Kingdom) N Skupski
3
7^{7}
[13]

(United Kingdom) D Evans
(United Kingdom) N Skupski
7^{7}
3
[10]

(United Kingdom) D Evans
(United Kingdom) N Skupski
1
7^{7}
[10]

- (Australia) A de Minaur
- (Australia) J Peers
6^{3}
6
[9]

- (South Africa) R Klaasen
- (Japan) B McLachlan
6
6^{5}
[4]

(South Africa) R Klaasen
(Japan) B McLachlan
7^{7}
3
[11]

(South Africa) R Klaasen
(Japan) B McLachlan
6^{1}
6
[10]

- (Brazil) M Melo
- (Netherlands) J-J Rojer
6
1
[8]

5
- (United States) R Ram
- (United Kingdom) J Salisbury
7^{7}
3
[5]

5
(United States) R Ram
(United Kingdom) J Salisbury
4
6
[10]

=== Bottom half ===
First round

Second round

Quarterfinals

Semifinals

8
- (Germany) K Krawietz
- (Romania) H Tecău
6^{4}
6
[9]

WC
(Greece) Pe Tsitsipas
(Greece) S Tsitsipas
7^{7}
3
[11]

WC
- (Greece) Pe Tsitsipas
- (Greece) S Tsitsipas
4
4

(Chile) C Garín
(Argentina) G Pella
4
7^{7}
[10]

(Chile) C Garín
(Argentina) G Pella
6
6

- (United Kingdom) J Murray
- (Germany) J-L Struff
6
6^{4}
[5]

- (Chile) C Garín
- (Argentina) G Pella
3
1

- (France) J Chardy
- (France) F Martin
7^{9}
4
[4]

4
(Spain) M Granollers
(Argentina) H Zeballos
6
6

(Russia) K Khachanov
(Russia) A Rublev
6^{7}
6
[10]

- (Russia) K Khachanov
- (Russia) A Rublev
3
1

4
(Spain) M Granollers
(Argentina) H Zeballos
6
6

4
- (Spain) M Granollers
- (Argentina) H Zeballos
6
5
[4]

7
(France) P-H Herbert
(France) N Mahut
6
6

2
(Croatia) N Mektić
(Croatia) M Pavić
3
7
[10]

WC
- (Italy) S Bolelli
- (Italy) J Sinner
4
4

7
(France) P-H Herbert
(France) N Mahut
7^{7}
7

(Finland) H Kontinen
(France) É Roger-Vasselin
6
6

- (Finland) H Kontinen
- (France) É Roger-Vasselin
6^{3}
5

Alt
- (Kazakhstan) A Bublik
- (Serbia) D Lajović
4
4

7
- (France) P-H Herbert
- (France) N Mahut
3
1

Alt
(Uruguay) A Behar
(Ecuador) G Escobar
6
6

2
(Croatia) N Mektić
(Croatia) M Pavić
6
6

- (Bulgaria) G Dimitrov
- (Belgium) D Goffin
4
3

Alt
- (Uruguay) A Behar
- (Ecuador) G Escobar
4
6
[3]

2
(Croatia) N Mektić
(Croatia) M Pavić
6
1
[10]
