= 2021 Mutua Madrid Open – Men's doubles =

Men's doubles
- 2021 Mutua Madrid Open

Final
- Champions: (Spain) Marcel Granollers (Argentina) Horacio Zeballos
- Runners-up: (Croatia) Nikola Mektić (Croatia) Mate Pavić
- Score: 1–6, 6–3, [10–8]

Events
Singles	men	women
Doubles	men	women
← 2019 ·	Mutua Madrid Open	· 2022 →

Marcel Granollers and Horacio Zeballos defeated Nikola Mektić and Mate Pavić in the final, 1–6, 6–3, [10–8], to win the men's doubles tennis title at the 2021 Madrid Open. It was the third-seeded duo's third ATP Tour Masters 1000 doubles title together. Mektić and Pavić were contending to be the first doubles team in five years to win a season's first three Masters 1000 events.

Jean-Julien Rojer and Horia Tecău were the defending champions from when the tournament was last held in 2019, though they returned to defend their title with different partners. Rojer partnered with Marcelo Melo but lost in the second round to Tim Pütz and Alexander Zverev. Tecău partnered with Kevin Krawietz and lost to Ivan Dodig and Filip Polášek, also in the second round.

Pavić and Robert Farah were in contention for the ATP No. 1 doubles ranking at the start of the tournament. Pavić retained the top ranking after Farah lost in the second round.

== Seeds ==
The top four seeds received a bye into the second round.

1. (Colombia) Juan Sebastián Cabal / (Colombia) Robert Farah (second round)
2. (Croatia) Nikola Mektić / (Croatia) Mate Pavić (final)
3. (Spain) Marcel Granollers / (Argentina) Horacio Zeballos (champions)
4. (Croatia) Ivan Dodig / (Slovakia) Filip Polášek (quarterfinals)
5. (United States) Rajeev Ram / (United Kingdom) Joe Salisbury (first round)
6. (France) Pierre-Hugues Herbert / (France) Nicolas Mahut (quarterfinals)
7. (Netherlands) Wesley Koolhof / (Poland) Łukasz Kubot (quarterfinals)
8. (United Kingdom) Jamie Murray / (Brazil) Bruno Soares (first round)

== Draw ==
=== Key ===
- Q = Qualifier
- WC = Wild card
- LL = Lucky loser
- Alt = Alternate
- ITF = ITF entry
- PR = Protected ranking
- SR = Special ranking
- SE = Special exempt
- JE = Junior exempt
- JR = Junior Accelerator Programme entrant
- CO = College Accelerator Programme entrant
- NG = Next Gen Accelerator Program entrant
- w/o = Walkover
- r = Retired
- d = Defaulted

=== Finals ===
Semifinals
(Germany) Tim Pütz (Germany) Alexander Zverev
3	(Spain) Marcel Granollers (Argentina) Horacio Zeballos	w/o
(Belgium) Sander Gillé (Belgium) Joran Vliegen	4	2
2	(Croatia) Nikola Mektić (Croatia) Mate Pavić	6	6

Final
3	(Spain) Marcel Granollers (Argentina) Horacio Zeballos	1	6	[10]
2	(Croatia) Nikola Mektić (Croatia) Mate Pavić	6	3	[8]

=== Top half ===
First round
WC	(Spain) M López (Spain) J Munar	6^{4}	4
(India) R Bopanna (Canada) D Shapovalov	7^{7}	6
(Germany) T Pütz (Germany) A Zverev	6	6
(Canada) F Auger-Aliassime (Poland) H Hurkacz	2	4
(Brazil) M Melo (Netherlands) J-J Rojer	6	6
8	(United Kingdom) J Murray (Brazil) B Soares	3	4
(Russia) K Khachanov (Russia) A Rublev	7^{7}	6
(Italy) F Fognini (Argentina) D Schwartzman	6^{5}	2
Alt	(South Africa) R Klaasen (Japan) B McLachlan	6	6
(United States) T Fritz (Austria) O Marach	2	3
(France) J Chardy (France) F Martin	3	3
6	(France) P-H Herbert (France) N Mahut	6	6

Second round
1	(Colombia) JS Cabal (Colombia) R Farah	3	4
(India) R Bopanna (Canada) D Shapovalov	6	6
(Germany) T Pütz (Germany) A Zverev	6	6
(Brazil) M Melo (Netherlands) J-J Rojer	4	4
3	(Spain) M Granollers (Argentina) H Zeballos	6	6
(Russia) K Khachanov (Russia) A Rublev	3	2
Alt	(South Africa) R Klaasen (Japan) B McLachlan	6^{5}	6^{5}
6	(France) P-H Herbert (France) N Mahut	7^{7}	7^{7}

Quarterfinals
(India) R Bopanna (Canada) D Shapovalov	4	6	[5]
(Germany) T Pütz (Germany) A Zverev	6	3	[10]
3	(Spain) M Granollers (Argentina) H Zeballos	7^{7}	6
6	(France) P-H Herbert (France) N Mahut	6^{3}	2

Semifinals
(Germany) T Pütz (Germany) A Zverev
3	(Spain) M Granollers (Argentina) H Zeballos	w/o

=== Bottom half ===
First round
5	(United States) R Ram (United Kingdom) J Salisbury	6^{5}	5
(Kazakhstan) A Bublik (Chile) C Garín	7^{7}	7
(Belgium) S Gillé (Belgium) J Vliegen	6	6
(Hungary) M Fucsovics (Norway) C Ruud	3	4
(Germany) K Krawietz (Romania) H Tecău	6	6
(Finland) H Kontinen (France) É Roger-Vasselin	3	4
7	(Netherlands) W Koolhof (Poland) Ł Kubot	6	5	[10]
WC	(Greece) Pe Tsitsipas (Greece) S Tsitsipas	4	7	[6]
(United Kingdom) D Evans (United Kingdom) N Skupski	3	6^{4}
(Brazil) M Demoliner (Russia) D Medvedev	6	7^{7}
(Australia) J Peers (New Zealand) M Venus	6^{9}	3
(Australia) M Purcell (Australia) L Saville	7^{11}	6

Second round
(Kazakhstan) A Bublik (Chile) C Garín
(Belgium) S Gillé (Belgium) J Vliegen	w/o
(Germany) K Krawietz (Romania) H Tecău	4	7^{7}	[7]
4	(Croatia) I Dodig (Slovakia) F Polášek	6	6^{2}	[10]
7	(Netherlands) W Koolhof (Poland) Ł Kubot	7	6^{4}	[10]
(Brazil) M Demoliner (Russia) D Medvedev	5	7^{7}	[3]
(Australia) M Purcell (Australia) L Saville	6	3	[4]
2	(Croatia) N Mektić (Croatia) M Pavić	4	6	[10]

Quarterfinals
(Belgium) S Gillé (Belgium) J Vliegen	6	3	[10]
4	(Croatia) I Dodig (Slovakia) F Polášek	3	6	[5]
7	(Netherlands) W Koolhof (Poland) Ł Kubot	3	7^{7}	[7]
2	(Croatia) N Mektić (Croatia) M Pavić	6	6^{4}	[10]

Semifinals
(Belgium) S Gillé (Belgium) J Vliegen	4	2
2	(Croatia) N Mektić (Croatia) M Pavić	6	6

== ATP doubles main-draw entrants ==
=== Seeds ===
Country	Player	Country	Player	Rank^{1}	Seed
COL	Juan Sebastián Cabal	COL	Robert Farah	5	1
CRO	Nikola Mektić	CRO	Mate Pavić	5	2
ESP	Marcel Granollers	ARG	Horacio Zeballos	17	3
CRO	Ivan Dodig	SVK	Filip Polášek	17	4
USA	Rajeev Ram	GBR	Joe Salisbury	23	5
FRA	Pierre-Hugues Herbert	FRA	Nicolas Mahut	26	6
NED	Wesley Koolhof	POL	Łukasz Kubot	29	7
GBR	Jamie Murray	BRA	Bruno Soares	30	8

- Rankings are as of April 26, 2021.

=== Other entrants ===
The following pairs received wildcards into the doubles main draw:

- ~~(Spain) Alejandro Davidovich Fokina / (Spain) Fernando Verdasco~~
- (Spain) Marc López / (Spain) Jaume Munar
- (Greece) Petros Tsitsipas / (Greece) Stefanos Tsitsipas

The following pair received entry into the doubles draw as alternate:

- (South Africa) Raven Klaasen / (Japan) Ben McLachlan

=== Withdrawals ===
Before the tournament

- (Croatia) Borna Ćorić / (Croatia) Franko Škugor → replaced by (Hungary) Márton Fucsovics / (Norway) Casper Ruud
- (Spain) Alejandro Davidovich Fokina / (Spain) Fernando Verdasco → replaced by (South Africa) Raven Klaasen / (Japan) Ben McLachlan
