= Horacio Zeballos =

Argentine tennis player (born 1985)

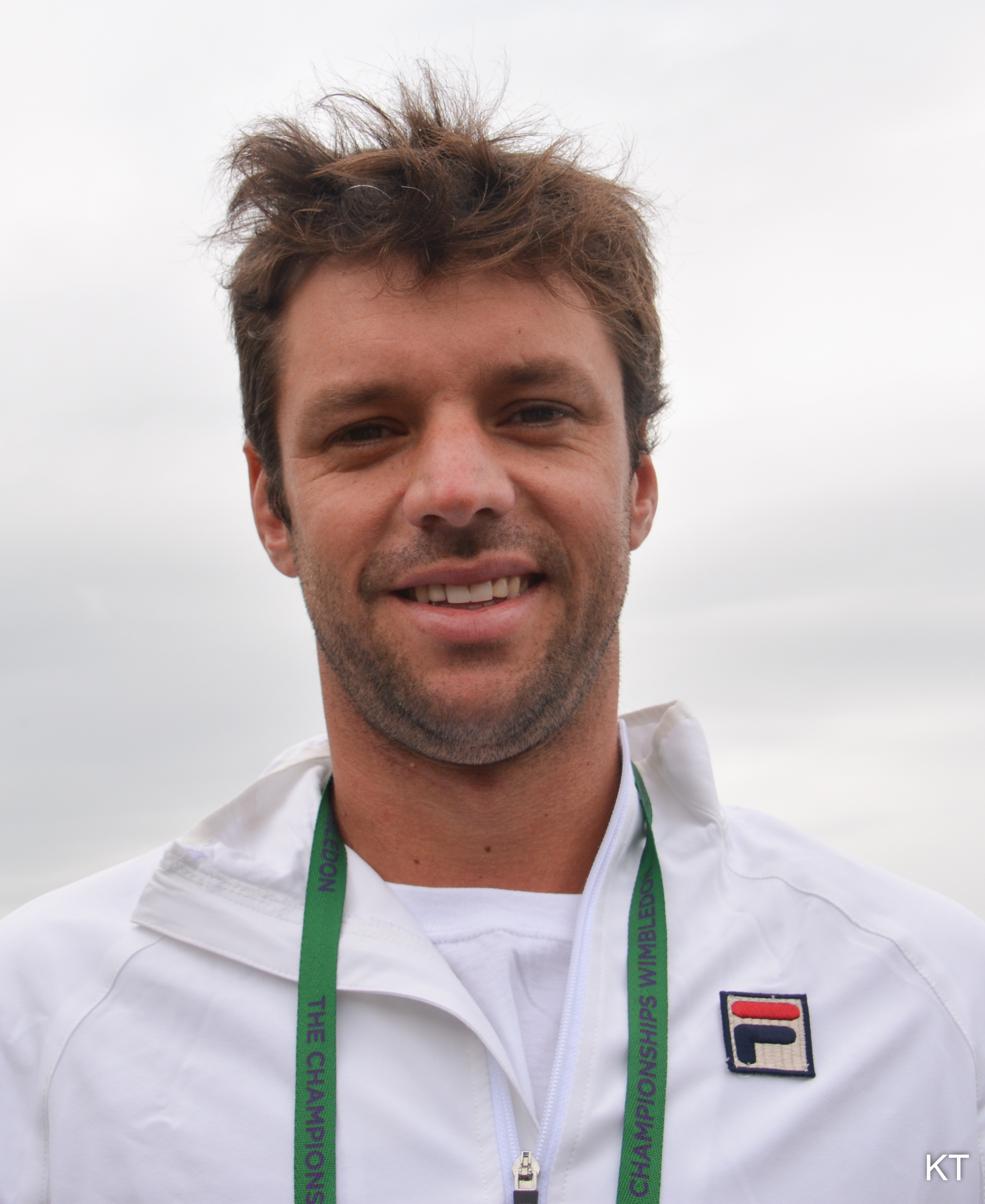
- Zeballos in 2015
- Country (sports): Argentina
- Residence: Buenos Aires, Argentina
- Born: 27 April 1985 (age 41) Mar del Plata, Argentina
- Height: 1.88 m (6 ft 2 in)
- Turned pro: 2003
- Plays: Left-handed (one-handed backhand)
- Coach: Alejandro Lombardo
- Prize money: US $10,430,468

Singles
- Career record: 91–133
- Career titles: 1
- Highest ranking: No. 39 (4 March 2013)

Grand Slam singles results
- Australian Open: 1R (2010, 2013, 2014, 2017, 2018)
- French Open: 4R (2017)
- Wimbledon: 2R (2018)
- US Open: 2R (2009, 2016)

Doubles
- Career record: 394–227
- Career titles: 28
- Highest ranking: No. 1 (6 May 2024)
- Current ranking: No. 3 (8 June 2026)

Grand Slam doubles results
- Australian Open: SF (2022, 2023, 2026)
- French Open: W (2025, 2026)
- Wimbledon: F (2021, 2023)
- US Open: W (2025)

Other doubles tournaments
- Tour Finals: F (2023)
- Olympic Games: 1R (2021)
Medal record
Men's tennis
Representing Argentina
Pan American Games
Gold medal – first place	2007 Rio de Janeiro	Men's doubles
- Last updated on: 6 June 2026.

Horacio Zeballos Jr. (locally [oˈɾasjo seˈβaʃos]; (Note: Latin American Spanish: [oˈɾasjo seˈβaʝos]) born 27 April 1985) is an Argentine professional tennis player. He has been ranked as the world No. 1 in men's doubles by the Association of Tennis Professionals (ATP), the first Argentinian man to achieve the feat. He has won 28 ATP Tour–level titles in doubles, including three majors at the 2025 and 2026 French Opens and at the 2025 US Open, all partnering Marcel Granollers.

In singles, Zeballos has a career-high singles ranking of No. 39, achieved in March 2013. He won his first and only ATP Tour singles title at the 2013 Chile Open, defeating Rafael Nadal in final and becoming one of only five players (with Roger Federer, Novak Djokovic, Andy Murray, and Nuno Borges) to beat Nadal in a clay court final. He also reached the fourth round at the 2017 French Open. Zeballos won the 2009 ATP Newcomer of the Year award.

== Personal life ==
Zeballos is an Argentine of Spanish descent. He enjoys music, ping-pong, and swimming. His father is also named Horacio Zeballos, and his mother is named Carolina. He has one sister, Carolina Jr. His favorite surface is clay, and Alejandro Lombardo coaches him.

== Career ==
=== 2008–2009: First ATP singles final ===
Zeballos competed primarily on the ATP Challenger Tour, where he won five singles titles and six doubles titles.

He reached his first ATP Tour final at the St. Petersburg Open, defeating Yuri Schukin, Oleksandr Dolgopolov Jr., Ernests Gulbis and Igor Kunitsyn before falling in the final to Stakhovsky in a third-set tiebreak.

=== 2010: Doubles: ATP title & major semifinal ===
Zeballos started the singles season in a slump, falling in the first round four times, but had an excellent start to the doubles season. In his first tournament, the Heineken Open, Zeballos and Rogier Wassen defeated the world No. 1 team Bob and Mike Bryan. Zeballos then reached the round of 16 at the Australian Open with countryman Leonardo Mayer and reached the final at the Movistar Open with Italian Potito Starace. Zeballos then turned to the clay in the Copa Telmex in Argentina, where in the first round, he defeated countryman and former French Open champion Gastón Gaudio. It was Zeballos' first ATP singles win since he reached the final in St. Petersburg. Zeballos next defeated former world No. 1 Carlos Moyá and reached his first ATP quarterfinal since October, where he then lost to countryman Juan Mónaco. In doubles, Zeballos and countryman Sebastián Prieto were the fourth seed and won the title against Simon Greul and Peter Luczak. It was Zeballos' first career ATP title. The following week, at the Abierto Mexicano Telcel, Zeballos lost in the first round to Łukasz Kubot. He made it to the doubles semifinals with partner Mónaco.

Zeballos was selected for the Argentine Davis Cup team for the first time. He played doubles with David Nalbandian against the Swedish pair of Robert Lindstedt and Robin Söderling. They won in straight sets. Zeballos reached a career milestone as he defeated his first-ever top-25 player, 24th ranked Gilles Simon, in the second round at the Sony Ericsson Open. He then lost in the third round to the eventual finalist Tomáš Berdych.

At the US Men's Clay Court Championships, he defeated Taylor Dent, Dudi Sela, and world No. 11 Fernando González for his first top-15 win and the biggest one of his career. He then faced eventual champion Juan Ignacio Chela in the semifinals, where he lost in straight sets.

At the US Open, Zeballos, with partner Eduardo Schwank, reached the semifinals in doubles.

=== 2011–12: French Open quarterfinal in doubles ===
Zeballos played mostly on the Challenger circuit in singles. He did not make it past the second round in any ATP events. He had more success in doubles, where he won his second title at the 2011 BMW Open partnering Simone Bolelli.

In 2012, he made it to the semifinals in Viña de Mar and Buenos Aires. At Roland Garros, he and partner Oliver Marach made it to the quarterfinals, where they were beaten by the Bryan brothers.

=== 2013: First ATP title & top 40 in singles ===
Zeballos won his first ATP singles title at Viña del Mar, where he defeated Rafael Nadal in three sets in his comeback tournament. This victory made Zeballos one of the only four players who have beaten Nadal in a final on clay (the others are Roger Federer, Novak Djokovic, Andy Murray and Nuno Borges).

=== 2016: Four doubles titles ===
He won three doubles titles with Julio Peralta and one with Andrés Molteni.

=== 2017–18: French Open singles fourth round ===
Zeballos' first match in the 2017 Australian Open was a 5-hour and 15-minute loss to Ivo Karlović, the second longest match by time at the Australian Open in the Open Era.

In June 2017 at Roland Garros, he had his best performance at a major, reaching the fourth round. He was beaten by 6th seed Dominic Thiem in straight sets. At the same tournament, he reached the quarterfinals partnering Julio Peralta.

=== 2019–21: Doubles: world No. 3, six titles ===
Zeballos won his first ATP Masters 1000 title at the 2019 BNP Paribas Open with Nikola Mektić. They defeated sixth-seeded Łukasz Kubot and Marcelo Melo in the final. Zeballos became the first ATP Masters doubles champion from Argentina since 1997 after Luis Lobo at the Hamburg Masters.

With his new partner Marcel Granollers, Zeballos won 6 titles starting in August 2019, and also made his first Grand Slam doubles final at the 2019 US Open, losing to the world No. 1 and top seeded pair Farah/Cabal. As a result, he reached a career-high ranking of world No. 3 in doubles on 9 September 2019. The pair won three Masters 1000: the 2019 Canadian Open, the 2020 Italian Open, and the 2021 Mutua Madrid Open. They also reached the 2021 Wimbledon Championships final losing to world No. 1 and top seeds Mektic/Pavic.

In August 2021, they reached a second Masters 1000 final for 2021 and fourth overall at the 2021 Western & Southern Open in Cincinnati, defeating Arévalo/Fognini. They defeated Austin Krajicek and Steve Johnson in the final to win their fourth Masters.

=== 2022: Doubles: Third straight ATP Finals ===
Zebalos and Granollers qualified for their third consecutive ATP finals, having advanced to the semifinals of the year-end championships in 2020 and 2021.

=== 2023: 20th doubles title, ATP Finals & first final ===
At the 2023 Australian Open Zebalos and Granollers reached back-to-back semifinals.

At the 2023 French Open they upset top seeds Wesley Koolhof and Neal Skupski to reach back-to-back semifinals. They lost to eventual champions Ivan Dodig and Austin Krajicek.

The pair won their first Masters of the season and fifth overall at the 2023 Rolex Shanghai Masters. As a result, he returned to the top 10 on 16 October 2023.

Granollers and Zebalos qualified for their fourth consecutive ATP Finals.

=== 2024–25: World No. 1, French Open champion, ninth Masters title ===
At the 2024 BNP Paribas Open in Indian Wells, Zeballos and Granollers reached the final, saving a match point. At the 2024 Miami Open, they again saved a match point to reach the semifinals.

At the 2024 Monte-Carlo Masters Zeballos and Granollers reached their third Masters semifinal in a row. At the next Masters 1000, the 2024 Mutua Madrid Open, Zeballos and Granollers reached the quarterfinals and both moved into a new career-high ranking of No. 2. With reaching their fourth Masters semifinal of the season, with a win over Hugo Nys and Jan Zielinski, they became joint World No. 1 on 6 May 2024, Zeballos being the first Argentinian man to accomplish the feat. They reached again a Masters final at the Italian Open, and fourth final for the season, defeating the newly formed pair of Alexander Bublik and Ben Shelton. They won their sixth Masters title as a team defeating Marcelo Arévalo and Mate Pavić.

At the 2024 French Open, they reached their third consecutive semifinal at this Major defeating 15th seeds Hugo Nys and Jan Zieliński, and then Tomas Machac and Zhang Zhizhen.

He won his eighth Masters title at the 2024 National Bank Open, second for the year and at this tournament, and tenth as a team with Granollers.

Zeballos and Granollers reached the 2025 French Open final, their fourth major final together, defeating Hugo Nys and Edouard Roger-Vasselin. They defeated Joe Salisbury and Neal Skupski in the final, 6–0, 6–7^{(5–7)}, 7–5 to win title. It was both players' first Grand Slam men's doubles title, following five previous runner-up finishes for Granollers and three for Zeballos.

== Significant finals ==
=== Grand Slam tournaments ===
==== Doubles: 6 (3 titles, 3 runner-ups) ====
Result	Year	Tournament	Surface	Partner	Opponents	Score
Loss	2019	US Open	Hard	(Spain) Marcel Granollers	(Colombia) Juan Sebastián Cabal (Colombia) Robert Farah	4–6, 5–7
Loss	2021	Wimbledon	Grass	(Spain) Marcel Granollers	(Croatia) Nikola Mektić (Croatia) Mate Pavić	4–6, 6–7^{(5–7)}, 6–2, 5–7
Loss	2023	Wimbledon	Grass	(Spain) Marcel Granollers	(Netherlands) Wesley Koolhof (United Kingdom) Neal Skupski	4–6, 4–6
Win	2025	French Open	Clay	(Spain) Marcel Granollers	(United Kingdom) Joe Salisbury (United Kingdom) Neal Skupski	6–0, 6–7^{(5–7)}, 7–5
Win	2025	US Open	Hard	(Spain) Marcel Granollers	(United Kingdom) Joe Salisbury (United Kingdom) Neal Skupski	3–6, 7–6^{(7–4)}, 7–5
Win	2026	French Open (2)	Clay	(Spain) Marcel Granollers	(Finland) Harri Heliövaara (United Kingdom) Henry Patten	6–4, 6–2

=== Year-end championships (ATP Finals) ===
==== Doubles: 1 (runner-up) ====
Result	Year	Tournament	Surface	Partner	Opponents	Score
Loss	2023	ATP Finals, Turin	Hard (i)	(Spain) Marcel Granollers	(United States) Rajeev Ram (United Kingdom) Joe Salisbury	3–6, 4–6

=== Masters 1000 tournaments ===
==== Doubles: 10 (9 titles, 1 runner up) ====
Result	Year	Tournament	Surface	Partner	Opponents	Score
Win	2019	Indian Wells Masters	Hard	(Croatia) Nikola Mektić	(Poland) Łukasz Kubot (Brazil) Marcelo Melo	4–6, 6–4, [10–3]
Win	2019	Canadian Open	Hard	(Spain) Marcel Granollers	(Netherlands) Robin Haase (Netherlands) Wesley Koolhof	7–5, 7–5
Win	2020	Italian Open	Clay	(Spain) Marcel Granollers	(France) Jérémy Chardy (France) Fabrice Martin	6–4, 5–7, [10–8]
Win	2021	Madrid Open	Clay	(Spain) Marcel Granollers	(Croatia) Nikola Mektić (Croatia) Mate Pavić	1–6, 6–3, [10–8]
Win	2021	Cincinnati Masters	Hard	(Spain) Marcel Granollers	(United States) Steve Johnson (United States) Austin Krajicek	7–6^{(7–5)}, 7–6^{(7–5)}
Win	2023	Shanghai Masters	Hard	(Spain) Marcel Granollers	(India) Rohan Bopanna (Australia) Matthew Ebden	5–7, 6–2, [10–7]
Loss	2024	Indian Wells Masters	Hard	(Spain) Marcel Granollers	(Netherlands) Wesley Koolhof (Croatia) Nikola Mektić	6–7^{(2–7)}, 6–7^{(4–7)}
Win	2024	Italian Open (2)	Clay	(Spain) Marcel Granollers	(El Salvador) Marcelo Arévalo (Croatia) Mate Pavić	6–2, 6–2
Win	2024	Canadian Open (2)	Hard	(Spain) Marcel Granollers	(United States) Rajeev Ram (United Kingdom) Joe Salisbury	6–2, 7–6^{(7–4)}
Win	2025	Madrid Open (2)	Clay	(Spain) Marcel Granollers	(El Salvador) Marcelo Arévalo (Croatia) Mate Pavić	6–4, 6–4

== ATP Tour finals ==
=== Singles: 2 (1 title, 1 runner-up) ===
Legend Grand Slam (0–0) ATP Masters 1000 (0–0) ATP 500 (0–0) ATP 250 (1–1)	Finals by surface Hard (0–1) Clay (1–0) Grass (0–0)	Finals by setting Outdoor (1–0) Indoor (0–1)

Result	W–L	Date	Tournament	Tier	Surface	Opponent	Score
Loss	0–1	Nov 2009	St. Petersburg Open, Russia	250 Series	Hard (i)	(Ukraine) Sergiy Stakhovsky	6–2, 6–7^{(8–10)}, 6–7^{(7–9)}
Win	1–1	Feb 2013	Chile Open, Chile	250 Series	Clay	(Spain) Rafael Nadal	6–7^{(2–7)}, 7–6^{(8–6)}, 6–4

=== Doubles: 50 (28 titles, 22 runner-ups) ===
Legend Grand Slam (3–3) ATP Finals (0–1) ATP Masters 1000 (9–1) ATP 500 (4–2) ATP 250 (12–15)	Finals by surface Hard (10–9) Clay (17–9) Grass (1–3)	Finals by setting Outdoor (26–18) Indoor (2–4)

Result	W–L	Date	Tournament	Tier	Surface	Partner	Opponents	Score
Loss	0–1	Feb 2010	Chile Open, Chile	250 Series	Clay	(Italy) Potito Starace	(Poland) Łukasz Kubot (Austria) Oliver Marach	4–6, 0–6
Win	1–1	Feb 2010	Argentina Open, Argentina	250 Series	Clay	(Argentina) Sebastián Prieto	(Germany) Simon Greul (Australia) Peter Luczak	7–6^{(7–4)}, 6–3
Win	2–1	May 2011	Bavarian Championships, Germany	250 Series	Clay	(Italy) Simone Bolelli	(Germany) Andreas Beck (Germany) Christopher Kas	7–6^{(7–3)}, 6–4
Loss	2–2	Sep 2013	Malaysian Open, Malaysia	250 Series	Hard (i)	(Uruguay) Pablo Cuevas	(United States) Eric Butorac (South Africa) Raven Klaasen	2–6, 4–6
Loss	2–3	Feb 2014	Argentina Open, Argentina	250 Series	Clay	(Uruguay) Pablo Cuevas	(Spain) Marcel Granollers (Spain) Marc López	5–7, 4–6
Win	3–3	Feb 2016	Brasil Open, Brazil	250 Series	Clay	(Chile) Julio Peralta	(Spain) Pablo Carreño Busta (Spain) David Marrero	4–6, 6–1, [10–5]
Win	4–3	Jul 2016	Swiss Open, Switzerland	250 Series	Clay	(Chile) Julio Peralta	(Croatia) Mate Pavić (New Zealand) Michael Venus	7–6^{(7–2)}, 6–2
Win	5–3	Aug 2016	Atlanta Open, United States	250 Series	Hard	(Argentina) Andrés Molteni	(Sweden) Johan Brunström (Sweden) Andreas Siljeström	7–6^{(7–2)}, 6–4
Win	6–3	Sep 2016	Moselle Open, France	250 Series	Hard (i)	(Chile) Julio Peralta	(Croatia) Mate Pavić (New Zealand) Michael Venus	6–3, 7–6^{(7–4)}
Loss	6–4	Feb 2017	Ecuador Open, Ecuador	250 Series	Clay	(Chile) Julio Peralta	(United States) James Cerretani (Austria) Philipp Oswald	3–6, 1–2 ret.
Win	7–4	Apr 2017	U.S. Men's Clay Court Championships, United States	250 Series	Clay	(Chile) Julio Peralta	(Germany) Dustin Brown (United States) Frances Tiafoe	4–6, 7–5, [10–6]
Loss	7–5	Aug 2017	Winston-Salem Open, United States	250 Series	Hard	(Chile) Julio Peralta	(Netherlands) Jean-Julien Rojer (Romania) Horia Tecău	3–6, 4–6
Loss	7–6	Sep 2017	St. Petersburg Open, Russia	250 Series	Hard (i)	(Chile) Julio Peralta	(Czech Republic) Roman Jebavý (Netherlands) Matwé Middelkoop	4–6, 4–6
Loss	7–7	Jan 2018	Brisbane International, Australia	250 Series	Hard	(Argentina) Leonardo Mayer	(Finland) Henri Kontinen (Australia) John Peers	6–3, 3–6, [2–10]
Win	8–7	Feb 2018	Argentina Open, Argentina (2)	250 Series	Clay	(Argentina) Andrés Molteni	(Colombia) Juan Sebastián Cabal (Colombia) Robert Farah	6–3, 5–7, [10–3]
Win	9–7	Jul 2018	Swedish Open, Sweden	250 Series	Clay	(Chile) Julio Peralta	(Italy) Simone Bolelli (Italy) Fabio Fognini	6–3, 6–4
Win	10–7	Jul 2018	German Open, Germany	500 Series	Clay	(Chile) Julio Peralta	(Austria) Oliver Marach (Croatia) Mate Pavić	6–1, 4–6, [10–6]
Loss	10–8	Feb 2019	Córdoba Open, Argentina	250 Series	Clay	(Argentina) Máximo González	(Czech Republic) Roman Jebavý (Argentina) Andrés Molteni	4–6, 6–7^{(4–7)}
Win	11–8	Feb 2019	Argentina Open, Argentina (3)	250 Series	Clay	(Argentina) Máximo González	(Argentina) Diego Schwartzman (Austria) Dominic Thiem	6–1, 6–1
Win	12–8	Mar 2019	Indian Wells Masters, United States	Masters 1000	Hard	(Croatia) Nikola Mektić	(Poland) Łukasz Kubot (Brazil) Marcelo Melo	4–6, 6–4, [10–3]
Loss	12–9	Jun 2019	Eastbourne International, United Kingdom	250 Series	Grass	(Argentina) Máximo González	(Colombia) Juan Sebastián Cabal (Colombia) Robert Farah	6–3, 6–7^{(4–7)}, [6–10]
Loss	12–10	Jul 2019	Swedish Open, Sweden	250 Series	Clay	(Argentina) Federico Delbonis	(Belgium) Sander Gillé (Belgium) Joran Vliegen	7–5^{(7–5)}, 5–7, [5–10]
Win	13–10	Aug 2019	Canadian Open, Canada	Masters 1000	Hard	(Spain) Marcel Granollers	(Netherlands) Robin Haase (Netherlands) Wesley Koolhof	7–5, 7–5
Loss	13–11	Sep 2019	US Open, United States	Grand Slam	Hard	(Spain) Marcel Granollers	(Colombia) Juan Sebastián Cabal (Colombia) Robert Farah	4–6, 5–7
Win	14–11	Feb 2020	Argentina Open, Argentina (4)	250 Series	Clay	(Spain) Marcel Granollers	(Argentina) Guillermo Durán (Argentina) Juan Ignacio Londero	6–4, 5–7, [18–16]
Win	15–11	Feb 2020	Rio Open, Brazil	500 Series	Clay	(Spain) Marcel Granollers	(Italy) Salvatore Caruso (Italy) Federico Gaio	6–4, 5–7, [10–7]
Loss	15-12	Sep 2020	Austrian Open Kitzbühel, Austria	250 Series	Clay	(Spain) Marcel Granollers	(United States) Austin Krajicek (Croatia) Franko Škugor	6–7^{(5–7)}, 5–7
Win	16–12	Sep 2020	Italian Open, Italy	Masters 1000	Clay	(Spain) Marcel Granollers	(France) Jérémy Chardy (France) Fabrice Martin	6–4, 5–7, [10–8]
Loss	16–13	Mar 2021	Mexican Open, Mexico	500 Series	Hard	(Spain) Marcel Granollers	(United Kingdom) Ken Skupski (United Kingdom) Neal Skupski	6–7^{(3–7)}, 4–6
Win	17–13	May 2021	Madrid Open, Spain	Masters 1000	Clay	(Spain) Marcel Granollers	(Croatia) Nikola Mektić (Croatia) Mate Pavić	1–6, 6–3, [10–8]
Loss	17–14	Jul 2021	Wimbledon Championships, United Kingdom	Grand Slam	Grass	(Spain) Marcel Granollers	(Croatia) Nikola Mektić (Croatia) Mate Pavić	4–6, 6–7^{(5–7)}, 6–2, 5–7
Win	18–14	Aug 2021	Cincinnati Masters, United States	Masters 1000	Hard	(Spain) Marcel Granollers	(United States) Steve Johnson (United States) Austin Krajicek	7–6^{(7–5)}, 7–6^{(7–5)}
Loss	18–15	Feb 2022	Argentina Open, Argentina	250 Series	Clay	(Italy) Fabio Fognini	(Mexico) Santiago González (Argentina) Andrés Molteni	1–6, 1–6
Win	19–15	Jun 2022	Halle Open, Germany	500 Series	Grass	(Spain) Marcel Granollers	(Germany) Tim Pütz (New Zealand) Michael Venus	6–4, 6–7^{(5–7)}, [14–12]
Loss	19–16	May 2023	Geneva Open, Switzerland	250 Series	Clay	(Spain) Marcel Granollers	(United Kingdom) Jamie Murray (New Zealand) Michael Venus	6–7^{(6–8)}, 6–7 ^{(3–7)}
Loss	19–17	Jul 2023	Wimbledon Championships, United Kingdom	Grand Slam	Grass	(Spain) Marcel Granollers	(Netherlands) Wesley Koolhof (United Kingdom) Neal Skupski	4–6, 4–6
Win	20–17	Oct 2023	Shanghai Masters, China	Masters 1000	Hard	(Spain) Marcel Granollers	(India) Rohan Bopanna (Australia) Matthew Ebden	5–7, 6–2, [10–7]
Loss	20–18	Nov 2023	ATP Finals, Italy	Tour Finals	Hard (i)	(Spain) Marcel Granollers	(United States) Rajeev Ram (United Kingdom) Joe Salisbury	3–6, 4–6
Loss	20–19	Jan 2024	Auckland Open, New Zealand	250 Series	Hard	(Spain) Marcel Granollers	(Netherlands) Wesley Koolhof (Croatia) Nikola Mektić	3–6, 7–6^{(7–5)}, [7–10]
Loss	20–20	Feb 2024	Argentina Open, Argentina	250 Series	Clay	(Spain) Marcel Granollers	(Italy) Simone Bolelli (Italy) Andrea Vavassori	2–6, 6–7^{(6–8)}
Loss	20–21	Mar 2024	Indian Wells Masters, United States	Masters 1000	Hard	(Spain) Marcel Granollers	(Netherlands) Wesley Koolhof (Croatia) Nikola Mektić	6–7^{(2–7)}, 6–7^{(4–7)}
Win	21–21	May 2024	Italian Open, Italy (2)	Masters 1000	Clay	(Spain) Marcel Granollers	(El Salvador) Marcelo Arévalo (Croatia) Mate Pavić	6–2, 6–2
Win	22–21	Aug 2024	Canadian Open, Canada (2)	Masters 1000	Hard	(Spain) Marcel Granollers	(United States) Rajeev Ram (United Kingdom) Joe Salisbury	6–2, 7–6^{(7–4)}
Win	23–21	Apr 2025	Țiriac Open, Romania	250 Series	Clay	(Spain) Marcel Granollers	(Germany) Jakob Schnaitter (Germany) Mark Wallner	7–6^{(7–3)}, 6–4
Win	24–21	May 2025	Madrid Open, Spain (2)	Masters 1000	Clay	(Spain) Marcel Granollers	(El Salvador) Marcelo Arévalo (Croatia) Mate Pavić	6–4, 6–4
Win	25–21	Jun 2025	French Open, France	Grand Slam	Clay	(Spain) Marcel Granollers	(United Kingdom) Joe Salisbury (United Kingdom) Neal Skupski	6–0, 6–7^{(5–7)}, 7–5
Win	26–21	Sep 2025	US Open, United States	Grand Slam	Hard	(Spain) Marcel Granollers	(United Kingdom) Joe Salisbury (United Kingdom) Neal Skupski	3–6, 7–6^{(7–4)}, 7–5
Win	27–21	Oct 2025	Swiss Indoors, Switzerland	500 Series	Hard (i)	(Spain) Marcel Granollers	(Czech Republic) Adam Pavlásek (Poland) Jan Zieliński	6–2, 7–5
Loss	27–22	Feb 2026	Dallas Open, United States	500 Series	Hard (i)	(Spain) Marcel Granollers	(France) Théo Arribagé (France) Albano Olivetti	3–6, 6–7^{(4–7)}
Win	28–22	Jun 2026	French Open, France (2)	Grand Slam	Clay	(Spain) Marcel Granollers	(Finland) Harri Heliövaara (United Kingdom) Henry Patten	6–4, 6–2

== ATP Challenger Tour finals ==
=== Singles: 26 (15 titles, 11 runner-ups) ===
Legend ATP Challenger Tour (15–11)	Finals by surface Hard (3–1) Clay (12–10)

Result	W–L	Date	Tournament	Tier	Surface	Opponent	Score
Win	1–0	Jun 2008	Guzzini Challenger, Italy	Challenger	Hard	(Slovenia) Grega Žemlja	6–3, 6–4
Loss	1–1	Sep 2008	Copa Petrobras Bogotá, Colombia	Challenger	Clay	(Brazil) Marcos Daniel	4–6, 6–4, 4–6
Win	2–1	Feb 2009	Open Bucaramanga, Colombia	Challenger	Clay	(Colombia) Carlos Salamanca	7–5, 6–2
Win	3–1	Mar 2009	Bancolombia Open, Colombia	Challenger	Clay	(Mexico) Santiago González	7–6^{(7–3)}, 6–0
Loss	3–2	May 2009	Open Pereira, Colombia	Challenger	Clay	(Colombia) Alejandro Falla	4–6, 6–4, 2–6
Loss	3–3	Jul 2009	Open Bogotá, Colombia	Challenger	Clay	(Brazil) Marcos Daniel	6–4, 6–7^{(5–7)}, 4–6
Win	4–3	Jul 2009	Manta Open, Ecuador	Challenger	Hard	(France) Vincent Millot	3–6, 7–5, 6–3
Win	5–3	Aug 2009	MasterCard Tennis Cup, Brazil	Challenger	Clay	(Brazil) Thiago Alves	6–7^{(7–4)}, 6–4, 6–3
Loss	5–4	Sep 2009	Open Cali, Colombia	Challenger	Clay	(Colombia) Alejandro Falla	4–6, 3–6
Win	6–4	Oct 2009	Copa Buenos Aires, Argentina	Challenger	Clay	(Argentina) Gastón Gaudio	6–2, 3–6, 6–3
Loss	6–5	Mar 2011	Challenger de Salinas, Ecuador	Challenger	Hard	(Argentina) Andrés Molteni	5–7, 6–7^{(4–7)}
Loss	6–6	May 2011	Bordeaux Challenger, France	Challenger	Clay	(France) Marc Gicquel	2–6, 4–6
Loss	6–7	Apr 2012	Open Barranquilla, Colombia	Challenger	Clay	(Colombia) Alejandro Falla	4–6, 1–6
Win	7–7	May 2012	Prague Open, Czech Republic	Challenger	Clay	(Slovakia) Martin Kližan	1–6, 6–4, 7–6^{(8–6)}
Win	8–7	Oct 2012	Uruguay Open, Uruguay	Challenger	Clay	(Germany) Julian Reister	6–3, 6–2
Win	9–7	Nov 2012	São Léo Open, Brazil	Challenger	Clay	(Chile) Paul Capdeville	3–6, 7–5, 7–6^{(7–2)}
Win	10–7	Jan 2013	Aberto de São Paulo, Brazil	Challenger	Hard	(Brazil) Rogério Dutra da Silva	7–6^{(7–5)}, 6–2
Win	11–7	Nov 2013	Lima Challenger, Peru	Challenger	Clay	(Argentina) Facundo Bagnis	6–7^{(4–7)}, 6–3, 6–3
Win	12–7	Jun 2014	Marburg Open, Germany	Challenger	Clay	(Netherlands) Thiemo de Bakker	3–6, 6–3, 6–3
Loss	12–8	Jul 2014	Svijany Open, Czech Republic	Challenger	Clay	(Slovakia) Andrej Martin	6–1, 1–6, 4–6
Win	13–8	Sep 2014	Quito Challenger, Ecuador	Challenger	Clay	(Chile) Nicolás Jarry	6–4, 7–6^{(10–8)}
Loss	13–9	May 2016	Venice Save Cup, Italy	Challenger	Clay	(Portugal) Gastão Elias	6–7, 2–6
Win	14–9	Jun 2016	Poprad-Tatry Challenger, Slovakia	Challenger	Clay	(Austria) Gerald Melzer	6–3, 6–4
Win	15–9	Jul 2016	Båstad Challenger, Sweden	Challenger	Clay	(Spain) Roberto Carballés Baena	6–3, 6–4
Loss	15–10	Nov 2016	Open Bogotá, Colombia	Challenger	Clay	(Argentina) Facundo Bagnis	6–3, 2–6, 6–7^{(4–7)}
Loss	15–11	Oct 2017	Copa Fila, Argentina	Challenger	Clay	(Argentina) Nicolás Kicker	7–6^{(7–5)}, 0–6, 5–7

=== Doubles: 10 (8 titles, 2 runner-ups) ===
Legend ATP Challenger Tour (8–2)	Finals by surface Hard (1–0) Clay (7–2)

Result	W–L	Date	Tournament	Tier	Surface	Partner	Opponents	Score
Loss	0–1	Mar 2007	Cachantún Cup, Chile	Challenger	Clay	(Uruguay) Pablo Cuevas	(Argentina) Brian Dabul (Spain) Marc López	2–6, 6–3, [8–10]
Loss	0–2	Jan 2009	Challenger Iquique, Chile	Challenger	Clay	(Uruguay) Pablo Cuevas	(Netherlands Antilles) Jean-Julien Rojer (Sweden) Johan Brunström	3–6, 4–6
Win	1–2	Mar 2009	Challenger de Providencia, Chile	Challenger	Clay	(Argentina) Sebastián Prieto	(Brazil) Flávio Saretta (Brazil) Rogério Dutra da Silva	7–6^{(7–2)}, 6–2
Win	2–2	Mar 2011	Cachantún Cup, Chile	Challenger	Clay	(Argentina) Máximo González	(Chile) Guillermo Rivera Aránguiz (Chile) Cristóbal Saavedra Corvalán	6–3, 6–4
Win	3–2	Sep 2011	AON Open Challenger, Italy	Challenger	Clay	(Germany) Dustin Brown	(Australia) Jordan Kerr (United States) Travis Parrott	6–2, 7–5
Win	4–2	Apr 2015	Savannah Challenger, US	Challenger	Clay (green)	(Argentina) Guillermo Durán	(United States) Dennis Novikov (Chile) Julio Peralta	6–4, 6–3
Win	5–2	Sep 2015	AON Open Challenger, Italy (2)	Challenger	Clay	(Argentina) Guillermo Durán	(Italy) Andrea Arnaboldi (Italy) Alessandro Giannessi	7–5, 6–4
Win	6–2	Sep 2016	AON Open Challenger, Italy (3)	Challenger	Clay	(Chile) Julio Peralta	(Belarus) Aliaksandr Bury (Belarus) Andrei Vasilevski	6–4, 6–3
Win	7–2	Oct 2016	Santiago Challenger, Chile	Challenger	Clay	(Chile) Julio Peralta	(Peru) Sergio Galdós (Argentina) Máximo González	6–3, 6–4
Win	8–2	Mar 2025	Arizona Tennis Classic, US	Challenger	Hard	(Spain) Marcel Granollers	(United States) Austin Krajicek (United States) Rajeev Ram	6–3, 7–6^{(7–2)}

== Performance timelines ==
Key
W	F	SF	QF	#R	RR	Q#	DNQ	A	NH

(W) winner; (F) finalist; (SF) semifinalist; (QF) quarterfinalist; (#R) rounds 4, 3, 2, 1; (RR) round-robin stage; (Q#) qualification round; (DNQ) did not qualify; (A) absent; (NH) not held; (SR) strike rate (events won / competed); (W–L) win–loss record.
To avoid confusion and double counting, these charts are updated at the conclusion of a tournament or when the player's participation has ended.

=== Singles ===
Current through 2018 Wimbledon.

Tournament	2009	2010	2011	2012	2013	2014	2015	2016	2017	2018	W–L
Grand Slam tournaments
Australian Open	A	1R	A	A	1R	1R	Q1	A	1R	1R	0–5
French Open	A	2R	A	2R	2R	Q2	Q1	1R	4R	2R	7–6
Wimbledon	A	1R	A	A	1R	A	1R	1R	1R	2R	1–6
US Open	2R	1R	1R	Q1	1R	Q1	Q1	2R	1R	A	2–6
Win–loss	1–1	1–4	0–1	1–1	1–4	0–1	0–1	1–3	3–4	2–3	10–23
Year-end ranking	45	110	109	85	56	123	124	71	66	173	

=== Doubles ===
Current through the 2025 Davis Cup Finals.

Tournament	2009	2010	2011	2012	2013	2014	2015	2016	2017	2018	2019	2020	2021	2022	2023	2024	2025	SR	W–L	Win%
Grand Slam tournaments
Australian Open	A	3R	A	A	1R	1R	2R	A	1R	1R	QF	3R	1R	SF	SF	3R	A	0 / 12	18–12	60%
French Open	1R	2R	A	QF	SF	2R	1R	1R	QF	2R	1R	3R	2R	SF	SF	SF	W	1 / 16	34–15	69%
Wimbledon	A	2R	A	A	2R	A	A	1R	2R	2R	3R	NH	F	A	F	SF	SF	0 / 9	19–9	68%
US Open	A	SF	2R	1R	3R	1R	1R	1R	2R	2R	F	1R	QF	1R	3R	QF	W	1 / 16	28–15	65%
Win–loss	0–1	8–4	1–1	3–2	7–4	1–3	1–3	0–3	5–4	3–4	10–4	4–3	9–4	8–3	15–4	12–4	16–1	2 / 53	93–51	65%
Year-end championship
ATP Finals	Did not qualify											SF	SF	RR	F	RR	RR	0 / 6	8–14	36%
ATP Tour Masters 1000
Indian Wells Masters	A	A	A	1R	A	A	A	A	A	SF	W	NH	1R	2R	1R	F	1R	1 / 8	13–7	65%
Miami Open	A	A	A	A	1R	2R	A	A	1R	A	QF	NH	1R	QF	1R	SF	1R	0 / 9	8–9	47%
Monte-Carlo	A	A	A	A	A	A	A	A	A	A	SF	NH	SF	QF	1R	SF	1R	0 / 6	8–6	57%
Madrid Open	A	A	A	A	2R	A	A	A	A	A	2R	NH	W	QF	1R	SF	W	2 / 7	14–4	78%
Italian Open	A	A	A	A	A	A	A	A	A	1R	QF	W	QF	A	SF	W	QF	2 / 7	19–5	79%
Canadian Open	A	A	A	A	A	A	A	A	A	A	W	NH	A	QF	SF	W	2R	2 / 5	15–3	83%
Cincinnati Masters	A	A	A	A	A	A	A	A	A	A	2R	QF	W	QF	1R	SF	A	1 / 6	10–5	67%
Shanghai Masters	A	A	A	A	A	A	A	A	A	QF	2R	NH			W	2R	A	1 / 4	9–4	69%
Paris Masters	A	A	A	A	A	A	A	A	A	A	2R	2R	A	2R	QF	2R	2R	0 / 6	2–6	25%
Win–loss	0–0	0–0	0–0	0–1	1–2	1–1	0–0	0–0	0–1	6–3	21–7	7–2	9–3	6-7	12–8	23–6	8–6	9 / 58	94–47	67%
Year-end ranking	79	33	88	63	40	79	72	45	38	29	4	3	6	14	5	4	5	$10,225,667		

== Notes ==
Awards
Preceded by Kei Nishikori	ATP Newcomer of the Year; 2009	Succeeded by Tobias Kamke
