= 2023 Rolex Shanghai Masters – Singles =

Singles
- 2023 Rolex Shanghai Masters

Final
- Champion: (Poland) Hubert Hurkacz
- Runner-up: Andrey Rublev
- Score: 6–3, 3–6, 7–6^{(10–8)}

Details
- Draw: 96 (12 Q / 5 WC )
- Seeds: 32

Events
Singles	Doubles
- Shanghai Masters

Hubert Hurkacz defeated Andrey Rublev in the final, 6–3, 3–6, 7–6^{(10–8)} to win the singles tennis title at the 2023 Shanghai Masters. He saved a championship point en route to his second ATP 1000 singles title. After his win in the second round, Zhang Zhizhen became the first Chinese man to reach the third and fourth rounds at Shanghai. He lost to eventual champion Hurkacz in three sets.

Daniil Medvedev was the reigning champion from when the tournament was last held in 2019, but lost to Sebastian Korda in the third round.

== Seeds ==
All seeds received a bye into the second round.

1. (Spain) Carlos Alcaraz (fourth round)
2. Daniil Medvedev (third round)
3. (Denmark) Holger Rune (second round)
4. (Greece) Stefanos Tsitsipas (third round)
5. Andrey Rublev (final)
6. (Italy) Jannik Sinner (fourth round)
7. (United States) Taylor Fritz (third round)
8. (Norway) Casper Ruud (fourth round)
9. (Germany) Alexander Zverev (second round)
10. (United States) Frances Tiafoe (second round)
11. (Australia) Alex de Minaur (second round)
12. (United States) Tommy Paul (fourth round)
13. Karen Khachanov (third round)
14. (Canada) Félix Auger-Aliassime (second round)
15. (United Kingdom) Cameron Norrie (second round)
16. (Poland) Hubert Hurkacz (champion)
17. (Italy) Lorenzo Musetti (second round)
18. (Bulgaria) Grigor Dimitrov (semifinals)
19. (United States) Ben Shelton (quarterfinals)
20. (Argentina) Francisco Cerúndolo (fourth round)
21. (Germany) Jan-Lennard Struff (second round)
22. (Chile) Nicolás Jarry (quarterfinals)
23. (Netherlands) Tallon Griekspoor (second round, retired)
24. (Spain) Alejandro Davidovich Fokina (second round)
25. (Argentina) Sebastián Báez (third round)
26. (United States) Sebastian Korda (semifinals)
27. (Czech Republic) Jiří Lehečka (second round)
28. (Argentina) Tomás Martín Etcheverry (second round)
29. (United States) Christopher Eubanks (third round)
30. (United Kingdom) Dan Evans (third round)
31. (France) Adrian Mannarino (third round)
32. (France) Ugo Humbert (quarterfinals)

Click on the seed number of a player to go to their draw section.

== Draw ==
Key

- Q = Qualifier
- WC = Wild card
- LL = Lucky loser
- Alt = Alternate
- ITF = ITF entry
- PR = Protected ranking
- SR = Special ranking
- SE = Special exempt
- JE = Junior exempt
- JR = Junior Accelerator Programme entrant
- CO = College Accelerator Programme entrant
- NG = Next Gen Accelerator Program entrant
- w/o = Walkover
- r = Retired
- d = Defaulted

=== Finals ===
Quarterfinals
18	(Bulgaria) Grigor Dimitrov	7^{7}	6
22	(Chile) Nicolás Jarry	6^{2}	4
32	(France) Ugo Humbert	2	3
5	Andrey Rublev	6	6
(Hungary) Fábián Marozsán	6	1	3
16	(Poland) Hubert Hurkacz	4	6	6
19	(United States) Ben Shelton	7^{12}	2	6^{6}
26	(United States) Sebastian Korda	6^{10}	6	7^{8}

Semifinals
18	(Bulgaria) Grigor Dimitrov	6^{7}	3
5	Andrey Rublev	7^{9}	6
16	(Poland) Hubert Hurkacz	6	6
26	(United States) Sebastian Korda	3	4

Final
5	Andrey Rublev	3	6	6^{8}
16	(Poland) Hubert Hurkacz	6	3	7^{10}

=== Top half ===
==== Section 1 ====
First round
(Portugal) N Borges	2	2
(France) G Barrère	6	6
Q	(Kazakhstan) M Kukushkin	6^{6}	6	6
(France) A Müller	7^{8}	3	2
(Australia) A Vukic	6	7^{9}
(Spain) R Carballés Baena	4	6^{7}
Q	(Kazakhstan) B Zhukayev	7	7
Q	(Italy) S Napolitano	5	5

Second round
1	(Spain) C Alcaraz	6	7
(France) G Barrère	2	5
Q	(Kazakhstan) M Kukushkin	2	0^{r}
30	(United Kingdom) D Evans	6	3
18	(Bulgaria) G Dimitrov	6	6
(Australia) A Vukic	4	3
Q	(Kazakhstan) B Zhukayev	6^{1}	6	2
13	K Khachanov	7^{7}	4	6

Third round
1	(Spain) C Alcaraz	7^{7}	6
30	(United Kingdom) D Evans	6^{1}	4
18	(Bulgaria) G Dimitrov	7^{8}	6
13	K Khachanov	6^{6}	4

Fourth round
1	(Spain) C Alcaraz	7	2	4
18	(Bulgaria) G Dimitrov	5	6	6

==== Section 2 ====
First round
Q	(Australia) P Sekulic	3	2
(Italy) L Sonego	6	6
(Australia) J Thompson	3	6	1
Q	(France) T Atmane	6	3	6
WC	(Argentina) D Schwartzman	5	6	6
(France) L Van Assche	7	3	2
(Japan) Y Watanuki	7^{9}	4	6
WC	(China) J Shang	6^{7}	6	4

Second round
10	(United States) F Tiafoe	6	2	3
(Italy) L Sonego	2	6	6
Q	(France) T Atmane	5	2
22	(Chile) N Jarry	7	6
27	(Czech Republic) J Lehečka	4	6	2
WC	(Argentina) D Schwartzman	6	3	6
(Japan) Y Watanuki	6^{2}	7^{8}	4
7	(United States) T Fritz	7^{7}	6^{6}	6

Third round
(Italy) L Sonego	6^{4}	2
22	(Chile) N Jarry	7^{7}	6
WC	(Argentina) D Schwartzman	6	3	7^{7}
7	(United States) T Fritz	4	6	6^{5}

Fourth round
22	(Chile) N Jarry	6	5	6
WC	(Argentina) D Schwartzman	3	7	3

==== Section 3 ====
First round
Q	(Australia) R Hijikata	7^{7}	7
(Serbia) L Djere	6^{4}	5
(Netherlands) B van de Zandschulp	6	6^{2}	6
(Australia) C O'Connell	2	7^{7}	4
(Australia) A Popyrin	6	3	4
(Italy) M Arnaldi	4	6	6
(United States) JJ Wolf	3	6	6
(Argentina) P Cachín	6	3	4

Second round
4	(Greece) S Tsitsipas	6	6
Q	(Australia) R Hijikata	4	2
(Netherlands) B van de Zandschulp	4	6	2
32	(France) U Humbert	6	1	6
21	(Germany) J-L Struff	3	6	4
(Italy) M Arnaldi	6	3	6
(United States) JJ Wolf	6	5	7^{7}
15	(United Kingdom) C Norrie	3	7	6^{4}

Third round
4	(Greece) S Tsitsipas	4	6	5
32	(France) U Humbert	6	3	7
(Italy) M Arnaldi	6	3	6^{4}
(United States) JJ Wolf	2	6	7^{7}

Fourth round
32	(France) U Humbert	6	6
(United States) JJ Wolf	1	2

==== Section 4 ====
First round
(Peru) JP Varillas	6^{3}	6^{6}
(Austria) S Ofner	7^{7}	7^{8}
P Kotov	1	4
(France) A Fils	6	6
A Shevchenko	6	3	2
Q	(Chinese Taipei) C-h Tseng	3	6	6
A Karatsev	6^{4}	6	2
(France) Q Halys	7^{7}	3	6

Second round
12	(United States) T Paul	6	6
(Austria) S Ofner	3	0
(France) A Fils	6	7
24	(Spain) A Davidovich Fokina	2	5
31	(France) A Mannarino	6	6
Q	(Chinese Taipei) C-h Tseng	2	2
(France) Q Halys	4	5
5	A Rublev	6	7

Third round
12	(United States) T Paul	6	6^{7}	6
(France) A Fils	4	7^{9}	4
31	(France) A Mannarino	3	0
5	A Rublev	6	6

Fourth round
12	(United States) T Paul	5	5
5	A Rublev	7	7

=== Bottom half ===
==== Section 5 ====
First round
(Germany) D Altmaier	4	6	6^{2}
(Japan) Y Nishioka	6	3	7^{7}
Q	(Australia) J Duckworth	4	7^{12}	3
(Germany) Y Hanfmann	6	6^{10}	6
(Serbia) D Lajović	6	7^{9}
(Switzerland) S Wawrinka	4	6^{7}
(France) A Rinderknech	6^{6}	2
(Hungary) F Marozsán	7^{8}	6

Second round
8	(Norway) C Ruud	7	6
(Japan) Y Nishioka	5	0
(Germany) Y Hanfmann	6	3	2
29	(United States) C Eubanks	4	6	6
23	(Netherlands) T Griekspoor	4	2^{r}
(Serbia) D Lajović	6	3
(Hungary) F Marozsán	6	7
11	(Australia) A de Minaur	3	5

Third round
8	(Norway) C Ruud	6	6
29	(United States) C Eubanks	4	2
(Serbia) D Lajović	3	3
(Hungary) F Marozsán	6	6

Fourth round
8	(Norway) C Ruud	6^{3}	6	4
(Hungary) F Marozsán	7^{7}	3	6

==== Section 6 ====
First round
(Australia) T Kokkinakis	6	6
WC	(Italy) F Fognini	2	4
(Australia) M Purcell	6^{5}	6	4
Q	(Chinese Taipei) Y-h Hsu	7^{7}	4	6
(China) Z Zhang	6	6
(France) R Gasquet	1	2
(United States) B Nakashima	6	7^{7}
(Spain) B Zapata Miralles	1	6^{3}

Second round
16	(Poland) H Hurkacz	7^{7}	6
(Australia) T Kokkinakis	6^{5}	4
Q	(Chinese Taipei) Y-h Hsu	6	6
17	(Italy) L Musetti	3	4
28	(Argentina) TM Etcheverry	6	3	4
(China) Z Zhang	4	6	6
(United States) B Nakashima	6	6
3	(Denmark) H Rune	0	2

Third round
16	(Poland) H Hurkacz	6	6
Q	(Chinese Taipei) Y-h Hsu	4	4
(China) Z Zhang	7^{7}	6
(United States) B Nakashima	6^{2}	2

Fourth round
16	(Poland) H Hurkacz	7^{8}	4	7^{7}
(China) Z Zhang	6^{6}	6	6^{4}

==== Section 7 ====
First round
(United States) M Giron	6	6
(Colombia) DE Galán	4	2
Q	(Australia) D Sweeny	6	6
(Japan) T Daniel	2	3
(Spain) J Munar	6	6
WC	(China) R Te	2	4
R Safiullin	6	6
(United Kingdom) A Murray	3	2

Second round
6	(Italy) J Sinner	7^{9}	6
(United States) M Giron	6^{7}	2
Q	(Australia) D Sweeny	2	4
25	(Argentina) S Báez	6	6
19	(United States) B Shelton	6	6
(Spain) J Munar	4	4
R Safiullin	6	6
9	(Germany) A Zverev	3	1

Third round
6	(Italy) J Sinner	3	6	6
25	(Argentina) S Báez	6	3	2
19	(United States) B Shelton	3	6	6
R Safiullin	6	3	4

Fourth round
6	(Italy) J Sinner	6	3	6^{5}
19	(United States) B Shelton	2	6	7^{7}

==== Section 8 ====
First round
Q	(Kazakhstan) D Yevseyev	4	2
(Hungary) M Fucsovics	6	6
(France) C Moutet	2	3
(United States) M McDonald	6	6
(Serbia) M Kecmanović	7^{8}	2	1^{r}
WC	(China) Y Bu	6^{6}	6	2
Q	(United States) A Kovacevic	4	6^{10}
(Chile) C Garín	6	7^{12}

Second round
14	(Canada) F Auger-Aliassime	6^{3}	6	3
(Hungary) M Fucsovics	7^{7}	4	6
(United States) M McDonald	6^{4}	6^{5}
20	(Argentina) F Cerúndolo	7^{7}	7^{7}
26	(United States) S Korda	6	6
WC	(China) Y Bu	1	4
(Chile) C Garín	3	3
2	D Medvedev	6	6

Third round
(Hungary) M Fucsovics	6	4	5
20	(Argentina) F Cerúndolo	3	6	7
26	(United States) S Korda	7^{10}	6
2	D Medvedev	6^{8}	2

Fourth round
20	(Argentina) F Cerúndolo	5	6^{6}
26	(United States) S Korda	7	7^{8}

== Qualifying ==
=== Seeds ===
1. (Australia) Rinky Hijikata (qualified)
2. (United States) Aleksandar Kovacevic (qualified)
3. (Australia) James Duckworth (qualified)
4. (Australia) Marc Polmans (qualifying competition, defaulted)
5. (France) Térence Atmane (qualified)
6. (Japan) Sho Shimabukuro (first round)
7. (South Africa) Lloyd Harris (first round)
8. (India) Sumit Nagal (first round)
9. (Chinese Taipei) Hsu Yu-hsiou (qualified)
10. (Chinese Taipei) Wu Tung-lin (qualifying competition)
11. (Japan) Shintaro Mochizuki (first round)
12. (South Korea) Hong Seong-chan (qualifying competition)
13. (Australia) Li Tu (qualifying competition)
14. Evgeny Donskoy (first round)
15. (Chinese Taipei) Jason Jung (first round)
16. (Kazakhstan) Mikhail Kukushkin (qualified)
17. (Japan) Kaichi Uchida (first round)
18. (Italy) Stefano Napolitano (qualified)
19. (Australia) Dane Sweeny (qualified)
20. (Kazakhstan) Denis Yevseyev (qualified)
21. (Australia) James McCabe (qualifying competition)
22. (Canada) Steven Diez (qualifying competition)
23. (Italy) Lorenzo Giustino (first round)
24. (Australia) Alex Bolt (first round)

=== Qualifiers ===
1. (Australia) Rinky Hijikata
2. (United States) Aleksandar Kovacevic
3. (Australia) James Duckworth
4. (Italy) Stefano Napolitano
5. (France) Térence Atmane
6. (Australia) Philip Sekulic
7. (Kazakhstan) Beibit Zhukayev
8. (Kazakhstan) Mikhail Kukushkin
9. (Chinese Taipei) Hsu Yu-hsiou
10. (Kazakhstan) Denis Yevseyev
11. (Chinese Taipei) Tseng Chun-hsin
12. (Australia) Dane Sweeny

=== Qualifying draw ===
==== First qualifier ====
First round
1	(Australia) Rinky Hijikata	6	6
(Czech Republic) Marek Gengel	3	2
(Zimbabwe) Benjamin Lock	7^{9}	3	6
23	(Italy) Lorenzo Giustino	6^{7}	6	4

Qualifying competition
1	(Australia) Rinky Hijikata	6	6
(Zimbabwe) Benjamin Lock	1	4

==== Second qualifier ====
First round
2	(United States) Aleksandar Kovacevic	6^{8}	7	7^{8}
PR	Alexey Zakharov	7^{10}	5	6^{6}
(Northern Mariana Islands) Colin Sinclair	6	4	3
13	(Australia) Li Tu	4	6	6

Qualifying competition
2	(United States) Aleksandar Kovacevic	6	6^{8}	7
13	(Australia) Li Tu	2	7^{10}	5

==== Third qualifier ====
First round
3	(Australia) James Duckworth	6	6
Mikalai Haliak	4	3
WC	(China) Xiao Linang	4	7^{7}	3
21	(Australia) James McCabe	6	6^{5}	6

Qualifying competition
3	(Australia) James Duckworth	7^{8}	6
21	(Australia) James McCabe	6^{6}	2

==== Fourth qualifier ====
First round
4	(Australia) Marc Polmans	3	6	7^{7}
Alibek Kachmazov	6	3	6^{3}
(Australia) Omar Jasika	1	5
18	(Italy) Stefano Napolitano	6	7

Qualifying competition
4	(Australia) Marc Polmans	7^{7}	6^{d}
18	(Italy) Stefano Napolitano	6^{3}	6

==== Fifth qualifier ====
First round
5	(France) Térence Atmane	6	6
(Japan) Hiroki Moriya	3	2
WC	(Vietnam) Lý Hoàng Nam	6	4	3
22	(Canada) Steven Diez	2	6	6

Qualifying competition
5	(France) Térence Atmane	7^{7}	6
22	(Canada) Steven Diez	6^{2}	2

==== Sixth qualifier ====
First round
6	(Japan) Sho Shimabukuro	2	7^{7}	4
(France) Arthur Weber	6	6^{3}	6
(Australia) Philip Sekulic	6	7^{7}
17	(Japan) Kaichi Uchida	3	6^{5}

Qualifying competition
(France) Arthur Weber	4	3
(Australia) Philip Sekulic	6	6

==== Seventh qualifier ====
First round
7	(South Africa) Lloyd Harris	6	3	6^{4}
(Czech Republic) Dominik Palán	3	6	7^{7}
(Kazakhstan) Beibit Zhukayev	4	6	6
15	(Chinese Taipei) Jason Jung	6	3	3

Qualifying competition
(Czech Republic) Dominik Palán	6^{6}	6	3
(Kazakhstan) Beibit Zhukayev	7^{8}	3	6

==== Eighth qualifier ====
First round
8	(India) Sumit Nagal	3	2
(Australia) Luke Saville	6	6
WC	(China) Mu Tao	2	4
16	(Kazakhstan) Mikhail Kukushkin	6	6

Qualifying competition
(Australia) Luke Saville	3	3
16	(Kazakhstan) Mikhail Kukushkin	6	6

==== Ninth qualifier ====
First round
9	(Chinese Taipei) Hsu Yu-hsiou	6	6
(Serbia) Miljan Zekić	2	1
(China) Sun Fajing	7^{7}	6
24	(Australia) Alex Bolt	6^{3}	3

Qualifying competition
9	(Chinese Taipei) Hsu Yu-hsiou	6^{1}	6	6
(China) Sun Fajing	7^{7}	3	1

==== Tenth qualifier ====
First round
10	(Chinese Taipei) Wu Tung-lin	6	6
PR	Egor Gerasimov	4	1
WC	(China) Zhou Yi	2	4
20	(Kazakhstan) Denis Yevseyev	6	6

Qualifying competition
10	(Chinese Taipei) Wu Tung-lin	4	6	3
20	(Kazakhstan) Denis Yevseyev	6	4	6

==== Eleventh qualifier ====
First round
11	(Japan) Shintaro Mochizuki	6	1	4
(Chinese Taipei) Tseng Chun-hsin	4	6	6
(Japan) Yasutaka Uchiyama	6	4	6
14	Evgeny Donskoy	2	6	1

Qualifying competition
(Chinese Taipei) Tseng Chun-hsin	7^{7}	4	6
(Japan) Yasutaka Uchiyama	6^{4}	6	3

==== Twelfth qualifier ====
First round
12	(South Korea) Hong Seong-chan	7	6
(Turkey) Ergi Kırkın	5	3
WC	(China) Li Hanwen	6^{2}	2
19	(Australia) Dane Sweeny	7^{7}	6

Qualifying competition
12	(South Korea) Hong Seong-chan	2	1
19	(Australia) Dane Sweeny	6	6
