= 2023 Rolex Shanghai Masters =

- Date: 4–15 October 2023
- Edition: 12th
- Category: ATP Masters 1000
- Surface: Hard / outdoor
- Location: Shanghai, China
- Venue: Qizhong Forest Sports City Arena

Champions

Singles
- (Poland) Hubert Hurkacz

Doubles
- (Spain) Marcel Granollers / (Argentina) Horacio Zeballos
- Shanghai Masters

The 2023 Rolex Shanghai Masters was a tennis tournament played on outdoor hard courts. It was the 12th edition of the Shanghai ATP Masters 1000, classified as an ATP Masters 1000 event on the 2023 ATP Tour. It took place at Qizhong Forest Sports City Arena in Shanghai, China from 4 to 15 October 2023. This was the first edition of the Shanghai Masters held since 2019, as the intervening editions were canceled due to the COVID-19 pandemic in China. It was also the first year that the main singles draw was expanded to 96 players from 56.

== Champions ==
=== Singles ===
- (Poland) Hubert Hurkacz def. Andrey Rublev, 6–3, 3–6, 7–6^{(10–8)}

=== Doubles ===
- (Spain) Marcel Granollers / (Argentina) Horacio Zeballos def. (India) Rohan Bopanna / (Australia) Matthew Ebden, 5–7, 6–2, [10–7]

== Singles main-draw entrants ==
=== Seeds ===
The following are the seeded players. Seedings are based on ATP rankings as of 25 September 2023. Rankings and points before are as of 2 October 2023.

Because the tournament was not held in 2022, the points dropping column reflects (a) points from tournaments held during the weeks of 3 October and 10 October 2022 (Astana, Tokyo, Florence, Gijón, and 2022 ATP Challenger Tour tournaments) or (b) the player's 19th best result (in brackets). Only points counting towards the players' rankings as of 2 October 2023 are shown in the table.

Seed	Rank	Player	Points before	Points dropping	Points won	Points after	Status
1	2	(Spain) Carlos Alcaraz	8,715	(0)	90	8,805	Fourth round lost to (Bulgaria) Grigor Dimitrov [18]
2	3	Daniil Medvedev	7,490	180	45	7,355	Third round lost to (United States) Sebastian Korda [26]
3	5	(Denmark) Holger Rune	4,640	(45)	10	4,605	Second round lost to (United States) Brandon Nakashima
4	6	(Greece) Stefanos Tsitsipas	4,615	300	45	4,360	Third round lost to (France) Ugo Humbert [32]
5	7	Andrey Rublev	4,550	180+250	600+45	4,765	Runner-up, lost to (Poland) Hubert Hurkacz [16]
6	4	(Italy) Jannik Sinner	4,910	0	90	5,000	Fourth round lost to (United States) Ben Shelton [19]
7	8	(United States) Taylor Fritz	3,865	500	45	3,410	Third round lost to (Argentina) Diego Schwartzman [WC]
8	9	(Norway) Casper Ruud	3,605	(10)	90	3,685	Fourth round lost to (Hungary) Fábián Marozsán
9	10	(Germany) Alexander Zverev	3,450	0	10	3,460	Second round lost to Roman Safiullin
10	13	(United States) Frances Tiafoe	2,645	300	10	2,355	Second round lost to (Italy) Lorenzo Sonego
11	11	(Australia) Alex de Minaur	2,685	(45)	10	2,650	Second round lost to (Hungary) Fábián Marozsán
12	12	(United States) Tommy Paul	2,660	45	90	2,705	Fourth round lost to Andrey Rublev [5]
13	14	Karen Khachanov	2,385	90	45	2,340	Third round lost to (Bulgaria) Grigor Dimitrov [18]
14	15	(Canada) Félix Auger-Aliassime	2,340	250	10	2,100	Second round lost to (Hungary) Márton Fucsovics
15	16	(United Kingdom) Cameron Norrie	2,020	(45)	10	1,985	Second round lost to (United States) J. J. Wolf
16	17	(Poland) Hubert Hurkacz	1,990	90	1,000	2,900	Champion, defeated Andrey Rublev [5]
17	18	(Italy) Lorenzo Musetti	1,925	90	10	1,845	Second round lost to (Chinese Taipei) Hsu Yu-hsiou [Q]
18	19	(Bulgaria) Grigor Dimitrov	1,880	(45)	360	2,195	Semifinals lost to Andrey Rublev [5]
19	20	(United States) Ben Shelton	1,735	50	180	1,865	Quarterfinals lost to (United States) Sebastian Korda [26]
20	21	(Argentina) Francisco Cerúndolo	1,635	(45)	90	1,680	Fourth round lost to (United States) Sebastian Korda [26]
21	27	(Germany) Jan-Lennard Struff	1,462	(25)	10	1,447	Second round lost to (Italy) Matteo Arnaldi
22	22	(Chile) Nicolás Jarry	1,552	(0)	180	1,732	Quarterfinals lost to (Bulgaria) Grigor Dimitrov [18]
23	24	(Netherlands) Tallon Griekspoor	1,481	(16)	10	1,475	Second round lost to (Serbia) Dušan Lajović
24	25	(Spain) Alejandro Davidovich Fokina	1,470	(20)	10	1,460	Second round lost to (France) Arthur Fils
25	29	(Argentina) Sebastián Báez	1,375	(10)	45	1,410	Third round lost to (Italy) Jannik Sinner [6]
26	26	(United States) Sebastian Korda	1,470	150	360	1,680	Semifinals lost to (Poland) Hubert Hurkacz [16]
27	30	(Czech Republic) Jiří Lehečka	1,367	(20)	10	1,357	Second round lost to (Argentina) Diego Schwartzman [WC]
28	31	(Argentina) Tomás Martín Etcheverry	1,346	(15)	10	1,341	Second round lost to (China) Zhang Zhizhen
29	32	(United States) Christopher Eubanks	1,313	30	45	1,328	Third round lost to (Norway) Casper Ruud [8]
30	33	(United Kingdom) Dan Evans	1,301	45	45	1,301	Third round lost to (Spain) Carlos Alcaraz [1]
31	23	(France) Adrian Mannarino	1,526	90	45	1,481	Third round lost to Andrey Rublev [5]
32	34	(France) Ugo Humbert	1,256	36	180	1,400	Quarterfinals lost to Andrey Rublev [5]

==== Withdrawn players ====
The following players would have been seeded, but withdrew before the tournament began.

Rank	Player	Points before	Points dropping	Points after	Withdrawal reason
1	(Serbia) Novak Djokovic	11,545	500	11,045	Schedule change
28	(Croatia) Borna Ćorić	1,415	90	1,325	
37	(Canada) Denis Shapovalov	1,175	180	995	Knee injury

=== Other entrants ===
The following players received wildcards into the singles main draw:

- (China) Bu Yunchaokete
- (Italy) Fabio Fognini
- (Argentina) Diego Schwartzman
- (China) Shang Juncheng
- (China) Te Rigele

The following players received entry from the qualifying draw:

- (France) Térence Atmane
- (Australia) James Duckworth
- (Australia) Rinky Hijikata
- (Chinese Taipei) Hsu Yu-hsiou
- (United States) Aleksandar Kovacevic
- (Kazakhstan) Mikhail Kukushkin
- (Italy) Stefano Napolitano
- (Australia) Philip Sekulic
- (Australia) Dane Sweeny
- (Chinese Taipei) Tseng Chun-hsin
- (Kazakhstan) Denis Yevseyev
- (Kazakhstan) Beibit Zhukayev

=== Withdrawals ===
- (Spain) Roberto Bautista Agut → replaced by (Hungary) Fábián Marozsán
- (Italy) Matteo Berrettini → replaced by Aslan Karatsev
- (Kazakhstan) Alexander Bublik → replaced by (Chile) Cristian Garín
- (Croatia) Borna Ćorić → replaced by Alexander Shevchenko
- (Serbia) Novak Djokovic → replaced by (Portugal) Nuno Borges
- (Germany) Dominik Koepfer → replaced by (Australia) Thanasi Kokkinakis
- (Japan) Kei Nishikori → replaced by (Spain) Jaume Munar
- (Canada) Milos Raonic → replaced by (Japan) Yosuke Watanuki
- (Finland) Emil Ruusuvuori → replaced by (Japan) Taro Daniel
- (Canada) Denis Shapovalov → replaced by (France) Alexandre Müller

== Doubles main-draw entrants ==
=== Seeds ===
Country	Player	Country	Player	Rank^{1}	Seed
CRO	Ivan Dodig	USA	Austin Krajicek	3	1
NED	Wesley Koolhof	GBR	Neal Skupski	7	2
USA	Rajeev Ram	GBR	Joe Salisbury	11	3
IND	Rohan Bopanna	AUS	Matthew Ebden	15	4
ARG	Máximo González	ARG	Andrés Molteni	19	5
MEX	Santiago González	FRA	Édouard Roger-Vasselin	23	6
ESP	Marcel Granollers	ARG	Horacio Zeballos	28	7
ESA	Marcelo Arévalo	NED	Jean-Julien Rojer	32	8

- Rankings are as of 25 September 2023

=== Other entrants ===
The following pairs received wildcards into the doubles main draw:

- (Ecuador) Gonzalo Escobar / (Kazakhstan) Aleksandr Nedovyesov
- (China) Li Zhe / (China) Sun Fajing
- ~~(Italy) Jannik Sinner / (China) Zhang Zhizhen~~

The following pair received entry as alternates:

- (Australia) Alexei Popyrin / (Australia) Aleksandar Vukic

=== Withdrawals ===
- (Poland) Hubert Hurkacz / (Croatia) Mate Pavić → replaced by (Poland) Hubert Hurkacz / (United States) Ben Shelton
- (France) Adrian Mannarino / (France) Fabrice Martin → replaced by (France) Ugo Humbert / (France) Adrian Mannarino
- (Brazil) Marcelo Melo / (Germany) Alexander Zverev → replaced by (Brazil) Rafael Matos / (Brazil) Marcelo Melo
- (Italy) Jannik Sinner / (China) Zhang Zhizhen → replaced by (Australia) Alexei Popyrin / (Australia) Aleksandar Vukic
