= Wesley Koolhof =

Dutch tennis player (born 1989)

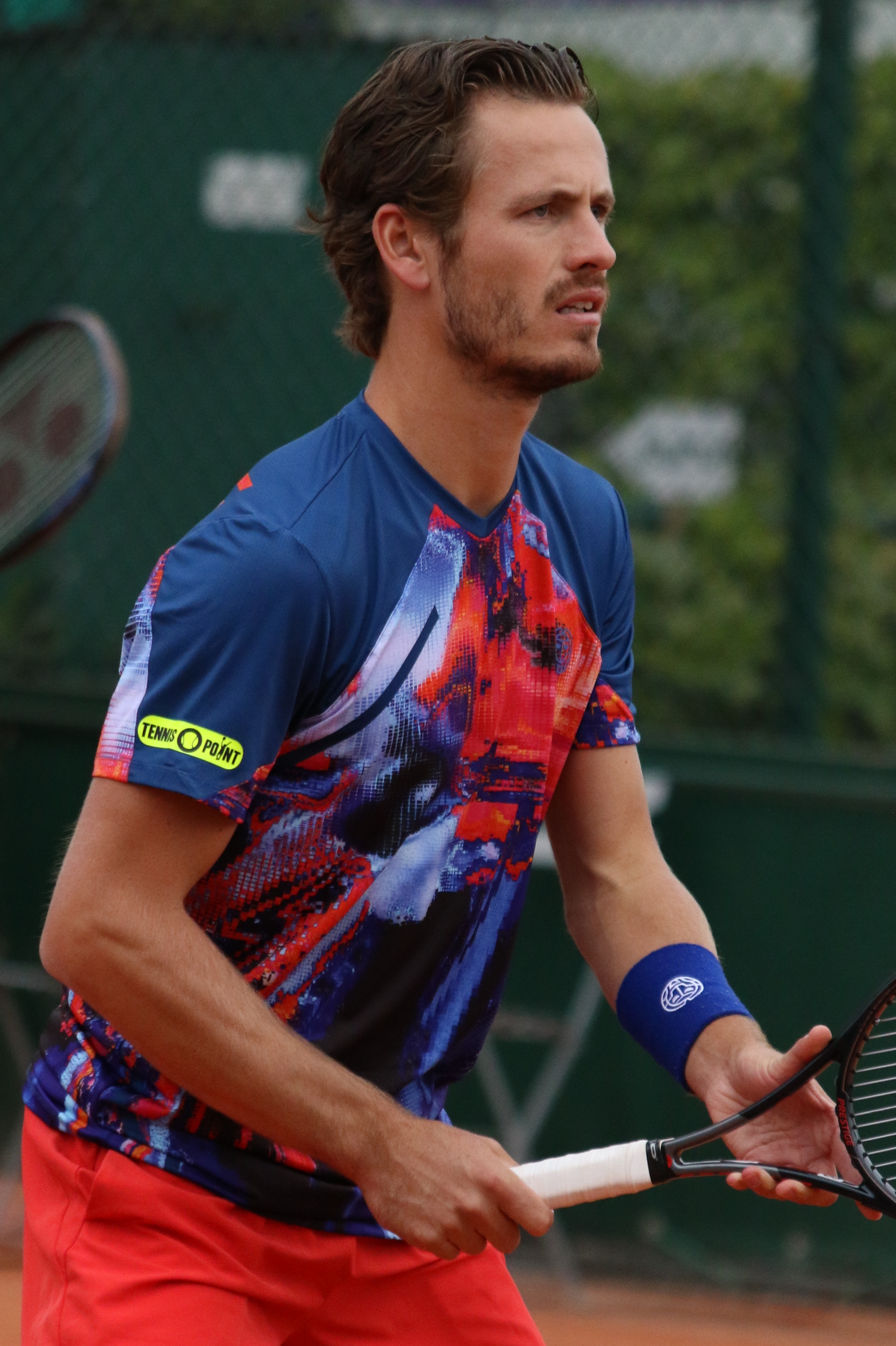
- Koolhof at the 2019 French Open
- Country (sports): Netherlands
- Residence: Duiven, Netherlands
- Born: 17 April 1989 (age 37) Zevenaar, Netherlands
- Height: 1.83 m (6 ft 0 in)
- Turned pro: 2008
- Retired: 24 November 2024
- Plays: Right-handed (two-handed backhand)
- Coach: Rob Morgan, Mariusz Fyrstenberg
- Prize money: US$5,209,208

Singles
- Career record: 0–0
- Career titles: 0
- Highest ranking: No. 462 (5 August 2013)

Doubles
- Career record: 309–195
- Career titles: 21
- Highest ranking: No. 1 (7 November 2022)

Grand Slam doubles results
- Australian Open: QF (2022, 2023)
- French Open: SF (2020)
- Wimbledon: W (2023)
- US Open: F (2020, 2022)

Other doubles tournaments
- Tour Finals: W (2020)
- Olympic Games: 2R (2021, 2024)

Mixed doubles
- Career titles: 1

Grand Slam mixed doubles results
- Australian Open: 2R (2022)
- French Open: W (2022)
- Wimbledon: SF (2019)
- US Open: QF (2018, 2019)

Other mixed doubles tournaments
- Olympic Games: SF (2024)

Team competitions
- Davis Cup: F (2024)

Wesley Koolhof (Dutch pronunciation: [ˈʋɛsli ˈkoːlɦɔf]; born 17 April 1989) is a Dutch former professional tennis player who was ranked World No. 1 in doubles. He is a two-time Grand Slam champion, having won the 2023 Wimbledon Championships in men's doubles with Neal Skupski and the 2022 French Open in mixed doubles with Ena Shibahara.

Koolhof also finished runner-up in men's doubles at the 2020 and 2022 US Opens, alongside Nikola Mektić and Skupski respectively. He has won 21 doubles titles on the ATP Tour, including the 2020 ATP Finals with Mektić and six at Masters 1000 level. Koolhof became world No. 1 for the first time in November 2022, becoming the fourth Dutchman to attain the top ranking in doubles after Tom Okker, Paul Haarhuis and Jacco Eltingh, and ending the year as joint No. 1 alongside Skupski. In singles, he reached his career-high ranking of world No. 462 in August 2013.

Koolhof has represented the Netherlands in the Davis Cup since 2019 and also competed at the 2020 Olympic Games partnering Jean-Julien Rojer and at the 2024 Olympics partnering Tallon Griekspoor. He was part of the team that reached the Davis Cup final in 2024 and the quarterfinals in 2022 and in 2023, the Netherlands' best performances in the competition since 2005.

== Personal life ==
He is the son of the late Dutch international footballer Jurrie Koolhof, and the elder brother of Dean Koolhof.

Koolhof married former WTA tennis player Julia Görges in December 2024 in Arnhem.

== Career ==
=== 2015–16: Partnership with Middelkoop, First ATP & 11 Challengers titles ===
Koolhof won his maiden ATP tour doubles title at the 2016 Sofia Open on indoor hardcourts in Bulgaria, partnering compatriot Matwe Middelkoop. The pair defeated Adil Shamasdin and Philipp Oswald in a third set tie-breaker 5–7, 7–6^{(11–9)}, [10–6] in the championship match to capture the title.

=== 2017–18: New partnership with Sitak, Five ATP finals ===
Koolhof teamed up with New Zealand player Artem Sitak mid-year in 2017. They reached the final at the 2017 BB&T Atlanta Open, losing to the Bryan brothers, and lost in the first round at the US Open before winning a Challenger event in Szczecin, Poland, and losing another ATP final, this time at the 2017 Moselle Open in Metz, France, to Julien Benneteau and Édouard Roger-Vasselin.

Starting the new 2018 year in Brisbane, Sitak and Koolhof lost in the semi-finals to Leonardo Mayer and Horacio Zeballos. They lost in the first round in Auckland to Michael Venus and Raven Klaasen, and then 7–6^{(5)}, 4–6, 4–6 in the second round of the Australian Open to the eventual winners, Oliver Marach and Mate Pavić.

Sitak and Koolhof then went to Newport Beach in California where, as top seeds, they lost in the first round in straight sets to Treat Huey and Denis Kudla. They then lost in the quarterfinals at Montpellier before going all the way to the final in the New York Open, being beaten by Max Mirnyi and Philipp Oswald in a match tie-break. They followed that up with a first-round loss at Delray Beach to Scott Lipsky and Divij Sharan.

Their up and down season continued in Brazil, where they reached the final in São Paulo, but were beaten in straight sets by Federico Delbonis and Máximo González. Their next stop was Irving, Texas, where they lost in the semifinals of the ATP Challenger to Alexander Peya and Philipp Petzschner. Moving to Europe, and playing in the Alicante Challenger in Spain as preparation for the European clay court season, they won their second title together when they beat Guido Andreozzi and Ariel Behar in the final in straight sets. They lost in the first round of their next tournament in Marrakech. In the Hungarian Open they beat the top seeds Nikola Mektic and Alexander Peya in the first round, but lost in the second to Marcin Matkowski and Sitak's former partner Nicholas Monroe.

Their next tournament was at Estoril where they went all the way to the final before losing to the British pair of Kyle Edmund and Cameron Norrie. They then lost in the first round of the Bordeaux Challenger tournament after Sitak had been hit in the right ear by a smash from Radu Albot, and also in the first round in Geneva, the last tournament before the French Open.

At Roland Garros, Sitak and Koolhof beat Andre Begemann and Antonio Sancic in the first round, then the ninth seeds Ivan Dodig and Rajeev Ram, before going down to fifth seeds Juan Sebastian Cabal and Robert Farah. All three matches went to a deciding set. After the tournament was finished, it was announced that the pair would split, with Koolhof joining Sitak's fellow New Zealander, and former partner, Marcus Daniell, and Sitak linking up with Indian Divij Sharan.

=== 2019: First Major quarterfinal with Daniell, Three Masters finals ===
Koolhof partnering with Stefanos Tsitsipas reached his first Masters 1000 final at the 2019 Miami Open losing to the Bryan brothers and with Robin Haase made the finals of the 2019 Monte-Carlo Masters and the 2019 Canadian Open.

At the 2019 Wimbledon Championships he reached the quarterfinals partnering Marcus Daniell in doubles and the semifinals in mixed doubles with Květa Peschke.

=== 2020: ATP Finals title & US Open final with Mektic, World No. 5 ===
2020 was the most successful year for Koolhof in his career thus far. He won the 2020 ATP Finals in doubles partnering Nikola Mektić. He also reached the doubles semifinal of the 2020 French Open and the final at the 2020 US Open partnering again with Nikola Mektić. As a result, he finished the year at world No. 5 in the top 10 rankings in doubles and No. 3 in the doubles race with his partner Nikola Mektić.

=== 2021: Seventh title, Second mixed doubles semifinal, Olympics debut ===
In May, Koolhof won his seventh title at the 2021 Bavarian Championships with Kevin Krawietz. He also reached his 7th and 8th consecutive Masters 1000 quarterfinals at the 2021 Mutua Madrid Open with Łukasz Kubot and at the 2021 Italian Open with compatriot Jean-Julien Rojer.

=== 2022: Partnership with Skupski, three Masters & mixed doubles titles, World No. 1 ===
Partnering with Neal Skupski he won two ATP 250 titles during the Australian Summer swing, before the 2022 Australian Open. The pair reached the quarterfinals at the first Grand Slam of the year for the first time at this Major. They won their third title at the 2022 Qatar ExxonMobil Open dropping only one set en route to the final where they defeated Rohan Bopanna and Denis Shapovalov in straight sets. He reached the final of the 2022 Miami Open with Skupski where they lost to John Isner and Hubert Hurkacz.

Seeded seventh, they reached their second Masters 1000 final at the 2022 Mutua Madrid Open after defeating John Isner and Hubert Hurkacz. In the final they defeated fifth seeds Robert Farah and Juan Sebastián Cabal to win their first Masters 1000 title in their career and as a pair. As a result, Koolhof returned to the top 10 in the rankings on 9 May 2022.

At the 2022 French Open he won his first Grand Slam title in mixed doubles in his career partnering Ena Shibahara. He also reached the quarterfinals with Skupski for the second time at this Major defeating unseeded pair of Americans Tommy Paul and Mackenzie McDonald.

He reached a new career high doubles ranking of World No. 4 on 8 August at the start of the 2022 National Bank Open where he reached with Skupski the semifinals of a Masters 1000 for the third time in the season defeating Lloyd Glasspool/Harri Heliövaara. Next the pair advanced to the eight final of the season defeating Krawietz/Mies. They won their sixth title defeating Dan Evans (tennis) and John Peers (tennis). As a result, he moved to world No. 3 in the doubles rankings on 15 August 2022.

Seeded 2nd at the US Open the pair reached the quarterfinals defeating Wimbledon champions Australian pair of Ebden/Purcell in three sets. Next they defeated Marcelo Demoliner and Joao Sousa to reach the semifinals. They reached the finals after defeating Marcelo Arevalo and Jean-Julien Rojer in the semifinals for a chance to become World No. 1. In the finals, they lost in straight sets to Rajeev Ram and Joe Salisbury. At the 2022 Rolex Paris Masters the pair Koolhof/Skupski reached the semifinals defeating ninth seeds Rohan Bopanna/Matwe Middelkoop climbing to World No. 1 and World No. 2 respectively, and solidifying the No. 1 position as a pair in the doubles race. They reached their 10th final and fourth at a Masters level for the season defeating seventh seeds Lloyd Glasspool /Harri Heliövaara. They won their third Masters title and seventh for the season defeating eight seeds Ivan Dodig/Austin Krajicek in the final. They also clinched the No. 1 year-end ranking as a team.

=== 2023: Wimbledon champion, 20th title ===
The world No. 1 duo Koolhof and Skupski continued their good form reaching yet another Masters final at the 2023 BNP Paribas Open where they lost to Rohan Bopanna and Matthew Ebden.

At the 2023 French Open he reached the quarterfinals with Skupski for the third time in his career. He lost to the 10th seeded team of Horacio Zeballos and Marcel Granollers. He won his first Grand Slam title at the 2023 Wimbledon Championships with Skupski and returned to the No. 1 ranking.

On 28 November 2023, he announced that the 2024 season would be his last on the ATP Tour.

=== 2024: Shanghai, Paris Bercy titles, Davis Cup finalist, retirement ===
In 2024, after reuniting with Nikola Mektić for his last season, he won his first ATP 500 title at the home tournament, the 2024 ABN AMRO Open in Rotterdam. Unseeded, he won the 2024 BNP Paribas Open with Mektic defeating Marcel Granollers and Horacio Zeballos in the final. Also unseeded at the 2024 Rolex Shanghai Masters, they reached the semifinals defeating Nathaniel Lammons and Jackson Withrow and kept their position of No. 8 above their opponents in the ATP doubles race. Following reaching the final with a win over Santiago González and Édouard Roger-Vasselin, the duo Koolhof and Mektic climbed a position up to No. 7 in the ATP Live doubles race. They won their fourth title for the season defeating Argentinian duo of Máximo González and Andrés Molteni. It was Koolhof's 20th doubles title.

Koolhof and Mektić won their fifth title of the season at the Paris Masters at Bercy, defeating Lloyd Glasspool and Adam Pavlásek in the final which went to a deciding champions tiebreak.

He finished his last season ranked in the top 10, at the 2024 ATP Finals, where he partnered with Nikola Mektić, losing his last ATP match in the round robin stage.

Partnering Botic van de Zandschulp Koolhof won the decisive match and helped the Netherlands team reach the semifinals at the 2024 Davis Cup, with a win over Spanish duo Carlos Alcaraz and Marcel Granollers. The Netherlands subsequently reached the final after defeating Germany in the two singles matches.

== Significant finals ==
=== Grand Slam tournament finals ===
==== Doubles: 3 (1 title, 2 runner-ups) ====
Result	Year	Championship	Surface	Partner	Opponents	Score
Loss	2020	US Open	Hard	(Croatia) Nikola Mektić	(Croatia) Mate Pavić (Brazil) Bruno Soares	5–7, 3–6
Loss	2022	US Open	Hard	(United Kingdom) Neal Skupski	(United States) Rajeev Ram (United Kingdom) Joe Salisbury	6–7^{(4–7)}, 5–7
Win	2023	Wimbledon	Grass	(United Kingdom) Neal Skupski	(Spain) Marcel Granollers (Argentina) Horacio Zeballos	6–4, 6–4

==== Mixed doubles: 1 (title) ====
Result	Year	Championship	Surface	Partner	Opponents	Score
Win	2022	French Open	Clay	(Japan) Ena Shibahara	(Norway) Ulrikke Eikeri (Belgium) Joran Vliegen	7–6^{(7–5)}, 6–2

=== Year-end championships ===
==== Doubles: 1 (1 title) ====
Result	Year	Championship	Surface	Partner	Opponents	Score
Win	2020	ATP Finals, London	Hard (i)	(Croatia) Nikola Mektić	(Austria) Jürgen Melzer (France) Édouard Roger-Vasselin	2–6, 6–3, [10–5]

=== Masters 1000 ===
==== Doubles: 11 (6 titles, 5 runner-ups) ====
Result	Year	Tournament	Surface	Partner	Opponents	Score
Loss	2019	Miami Open	Hard	(Greece) Stefanos Tsitsipas	(United States) Bob Bryan (United States) Mike Bryan	5–7, 6–7^{(8–10)}
Loss	2019	Monte-Carlo Masters	Clay	(Netherlands) Robin Haase	(Croatia) Nikola Mektić (Croatia) Franko Škugor	7–6^{(7–3)}, 6–7^{(3–7)}, [9–11]
Loss	2019	Canadian Open	Hard	(Netherlands) Robin Haase	(Spain) Marcel Granollers (Argentina) Horacio Zeballos	5–7, 5–7
Loss	2022	Miami Open	Hard	(United Kingdom) Neal Skupski	(Poland) Hubert Hurkacz (United States) John Isner	6–7^{(5–7)}, 4–6
Win	2022	Madrid Open	Clay	(United Kingdom) Neal Skupski	(Colombia) Juan Sebastián Cabal (Colombia) Robert Farah	6–7^{(4–7)}, 6–4, [10–5]
Win	2022	Canadian Open	Hard	(United Kingdom) Neal Skupski	(United Kingdom) Dan Evans (Australia) John Peers	6–2, 4–6, [10–6]
Win	2022	Paris Masters	Hard (i)	(United Kingdom) Neal Skupski	(Croatia) Ivan Dodig (United States) Austin Krajicek	7–6^{(7–5)}, 6–4
Loss	2023	Indian Wells Masters	Hard	(United Kingdom) Neal Skupski	(India) Rohan Bopanna (Australia) Matthew Ebden	3–6, 6–2, [8–10]
Win	2024	Indian Wells Masters	Hard	(Croatia) Nikola Mektić	(Spain) Marcel Granollers (Argentina) Horacio Zeballos	7–6^{(7–2)}, 7–6^{(7–4)}
Win	2024	Shanghai Masters	Hard	(Croatia) Nikola Mektić	(Argentina) Máximo González (Argentina) Andrés Molteni	6–4, 6–4
Win	2024	Paris Masters (2)	Hard (i)	(Croatia) Nikola Mektić	(United Kingdom) Lloyd Glasspool (Czech Republic) Adam Pavlásek	3–6, 6–3, [10–5]

=== Summer Olympics ===
==== Mixed doubles: 1 (1 fourth place) ====
Result	Year	Tournament	Surface	Partner	Opponents	Score
4th place	2024	Summer Olympics, Paris	Clay	(Netherlands) Demi Schuurs	(Canada) Gabriela Dabrowski (Canada) Félix Auger-Aliassime	3–6, 6–7^{(2–7)}

== ATP Tour finals ==
=== Doubles: 45 (21 titles, 24 runner-ups) ===
Legend Grand Slam tournaments (1–2) ATP World Tour Finals (1–0) ATP World Tour Masters 1000 (6–5) ATP World Tour 500 Series (1–6) ATP World Tour 250 Series (12–11)	Finals by surface Hard (15–15) Clay (3–7) Grass (3–2)	Finals by setting Outdoor (17–16) Indoor (4–8)

Result	W–L	Date	Tournament	Tier	Surface	Partner	Opponents	Score
Win	1–0	Feb 2016	Sofia Open, Bulgaria	250 Series	Hard (i)	(Netherlands) Matwé Middelkoop	(Austria) Philipp Oswald (Canada) Adil Shamasdin	5–7, 7–6^{(11–9)}, [10–6]
Win	2–0	Jul 2016	Austrian Open, Austria	250 Series	Clay	(Netherlands) Matwé Middelkoop	(Austria) Dennis Novak (Austria) Dominic Thiem	2–6, 6–3, [11–9]
Win	3–0	Jan 2017	Sydney International, Australia	250 Series	Hard	(Netherlands) Matwé Middelkoop	(United Kingdom) Jamie Murray (Brazil) Bruno Soares	6–3, 7–5
Loss	3–1	Feb 2017	Rotterdam Open, Netherlands	500 Series	Hard (i)	(Netherlands) Matwé Middelkoop	(Croatia) Ivan Dodig (Spain) Marcel Granollers	6–7^{(5–7)}, 3–6
Loss	3–2	Jul 2017	Atlanta Open, US	250 Series	Hard	(New Zealand) Artem Sitak	(United States) Bob Bryan (United States) Mike Bryan	3–6, 4–6
Loss	3–3	Sep 2017	Moselle Open, France	250 Series	Hard (i)	(New Zealand) Artem Sitak	(France) Julien Benneteau (France) Édouard Roger-Vasselin	5–7, 3–6
Loss	3–4	Feb 2018	New York Open, US	250 Series	Hard (i)	(New Zealand) Artem Sitak	(Belarus) Max Mirnyi (Austria) Philipp Oswald	4–6, 6–4, [6–10]
Loss	3–5	Mar 2018	Brasil Open, Brazil	250 Series	Clay (i)	(New Zealand) Artem Sitak	(Argentina) Federico Delbonis (Argentina) Máximo González	4–6, 2–6
Loss	3–6	May 2018	Estoril Open, Portugal	250 Series	Clay	(New Zealand) Artem Sitak	(United Kingdom) Kyle Edmund (United Kingdom) Cameron Norrie	4–6, 2–6
Loss	3–7	Oct 2018	Stockholm Open, Sweden	250 Series	Hard (i)	(New Zealand) Marcus Daniell	(United Kingdom) Luke Bambridge (United Kingdom) Jonny O'Mara	5–7, 6–7^{(8–10)}
Win	4–7	Jan 2019	Brisbane International, Australia	250 Series	Hard	(New Zealand) Marcus Daniell	(United States) Rajeev Ram (United Kingdom) Joe Salisbury	6–4, 7–6^{(8–6)}
Loss	4–8	Mar 2019	Miami Open, US	Masters 1000	Hard	(Greece) Stefanos Tsitsipas	(United States) Bob Bryan (United States) Mike Bryan	5–7, 6–7^{(8–10)}
Loss	4–9	Apr 2019	Monte-Carlo Masters, Monaco	Masters 1000	Clay	(Netherlands) Robin Haase	(Croatia) Nikola Mektić (Croatia) Franko Škugor	7–6^{(7–3)}, 6–7^{(3–7)}, [9–11]
Loss	4–10	Apr 2019	Hungarian Open, Hungary	250 Series	Clay	(New Zealand) Marcus Daniell	(United Kingdom) Ken Skupski (United Kingdom) Neal Skupski	3–6, 4–6
Loss	4–11	Jun 2019	Rosmalen Championships, Netherlands	250 Series	Grass	(New Zealand) Marcus Daniell	(United Kingdom) Dominic Inglot (United States) Austin Krajicek	4–6, 6–4, [4–10]
Loss	4–12	Jul 2019	German Open, Germany	500 Series	Clay	(Netherlands) Robin Haase	(Austria) Oliver Marach (Austria) Jürgen Melzer	2–6, 6–7^{(3–7)}
Loss	4–13	Aug 2019	Canadian Open, Canada	Masters 1000	Hard	(Netherlands) Robin Haase	(Spain) Marcel Granollers (Argentina) Horacio Zeballos	5–7, 5–7
Win	5–13	Jan 2020	Qatar Open, Qatar	250 Series	Hard	(India) Rohan Bopanna	(United Kingdom) Luke Bambridge (Mexico) Santiago González	3–6, 6–2, [10–6]
Loss	5–14	Feb 2020	Open 13, France	250 Series	Hard (i)	(Croatia) Nikola Mektić	(France) Nicolas Mahut (Canada) Vasek Pospisil	3–6, 4–6
Loss	5–15	Sep 2020	US Open, New York City, US	Grand Slam	Hard	(Croatia) Nikola Mektić	(Croatia) Mate Pavić (Brazil) Bruno Soares	5–7, 3–6
Win	6–15	Nov 2020	ATP Finals, UK	Tour Finals	Hard (i)	(Croatia) Nikola Mektić	(Austria) Jürgen Melzer (France) Édouard Roger-Vasselin	2–6, 6–3, [10–5]
Win	7–15	May 2021	Bavarian Championships, Germany	250 Series	Clay	(Germany) Kevin Krawietz	(Belgium) Sander Gillé (Belgium) Joran Vliegen	4–6, 6–4, [10–5]
Loss	7–16	Oct 2021	European Open, Belgium	250 Series	Hard (i)	(Netherlands) Jean-Julien Rojer	(France) Nicolas Mahut (France) Fabrice Martin	0–6, 1–6
Win	8–16	Jan 2022	Melbourne Summer Set 1, Australia	250 Series	Hard	(United Kingdom) Neal Skupski	(Kazakhstan) Aleksandr Nedovyesov (Pakistan) Aisam-ul-Haq Qureshi	6–4, 6–4
Win	9–16	Jan 2022	Adelaide International 2, Australia	250 Series	Hard	(United Kingdom) Neal Skupski	(Uruguay) Ariel Behar (Ecuador) Gonzalo Escobar	7–6^{(7–5)}, 6–4
Win	10–16	Feb 2022	Qatar Open, Qatar (2)	250 Series	Hard	(United Kingdom) Neal Skupski	(India) Rohan Bopanna (Canada) Denis Shapovalov	7–6^{(7–4)}, 6–1
Loss	10–17	Apr 2022	Miami Open, US	Masters 1000	Hard	(United Kingdom) Neal Skupski	(Poland) Hubert Hurkacz (United States) John Isner	6–7^{(5–7)}, 4–6
Loss	10–18	Apr 2022	Barcelona Open, Spain	500 Series	Clay	(United Kingdom) Neal Skupski	(Germany) Kevin Krawietz (Germany) Andreas Mies	7–6^{(7–3)}, 6–7^{(5–7)}, [6–10]
Win	11–18	May 2022	Madrid Open, Spain	Masters 1000	Clay	(United Kingdom) Neal Skupski	(Colombia) Juan Sebastián Cabal (Colombia) Robert Farah	6–7^{(4–7)}, 6–4, [10–5]
Win	12–18	Jun 2022	Rosmalen Championships, Netherlands	250 Series	Grass	(United Kingdom) Neal Skupski	(Australia) Matthew Ebden (Australia) Max Purcell	4–6, 7–5, [10–6]
Win	13–18	Aug 2022	Canadian Open, Canada	Masters 1000	Hard	(United Kingdom) Neal Skupski	(United Kingdom) Dan Evans (Australia) John Peers	6–2, 4–6, [10–6]
Loss	13–19	Sep 2022	US Open, New York City, US	Grand Slam	Hard	(United Kingdom) Neal Skupski	(United States) Rajeev Ram (United Kingdom) Joe Salisbury	6–7^{(4–7)}, 5–7
Win	14–19	Nov 2022	Paris Masters, France	Masters 1000	Hard (i)	(United Kingdom) Neal Skupski	(Croatia) Ivan Dodig (United States) Austin Krajicek	7–6^{(7–5)}, 6–4
Loss	14–20	Mar 2023	Indian Wells Masters, US	Masters 1000	Hard	(United Kingdom) Neal Skupski	(India) Rohan Bopanna (Australia) Matthew Ebden	3–6, 6–2, [8–10]
Loss	14–21	Apr 2023	Barcelona Open, Spain	500 Series	Clay	(United Kingdom) Neal Skupski	(Argentina) Máximo González (Argentina) Andrés Molteni	3–6, 7–6^{(10–8)}, [4–10]
Win	15–21	Jun 2023	Rosmalen Championships, Netherlands (2)	250 Series	Grass	(United Kingdom) Neal Skupski	(Ecuador) Gonzalo Escobar (Kazakhstan) Aleksandr Nedovyesov	7–6^{(7–1)}, 6–2
Win	16–21	Jul 2023	Wimbledon Championships, London, UK	Grand Slam	Grass	(United Kingdom) Neal Skupski	(Spain) Marcel Granollers (Argentina) Horacio Zeballos	6–4, 6–4
Loss	16–22	Oct 2023	China Open, China	500 Series	Hard	(United Kingdom) Neal Skupski	(Croatia) Ivan Dodig (United States) Austin Krajicek	7–6^{(14–12)}, 3–6, [5–10]
Win	17–22	Jan 2024	Auckland Open, New Zealand	250 Series	Hard	(Croatia) Nikola Mektić	(Spain) Marcel Granollers (Argentina) Horacio Zeballos	6–3, 6–7^{(5–7)}, [10–7]
Win	18–22	Feb 2024	Rotterdam Open, Netherlands	500 Series	Hard (i)	(Croatia) Nikola Mektić	(Netherlands) Robin Haase (Netherlands) Botic van de Zandschulp	6–3, 7–5
Win	19–22	Mar 2024	Indian Wells Masters, US	Masters 1000	Hard	(Croatia) Nikola Mektić	(Spain) Marcel Granollers (Argentina) Horacio Zeballos	7–6^{(7–2)}, 7–6^{(7–4)}
Loss	19–23	Jun 2024	Rosmalen Championships, Netherlands	250 Series	Grass	(Croatia) Nikola Mektić	(United States) Nathaniel Lammons (United States) Jackson Withrow	6–7^{(5–7)}, 6–7^{(3–7)}
Win	20–23	Oct 2024	Shanghai Masters, China	Masters 1000	Hard	(Croatia) Nikola Mektić	(Argentina) Máximo González (Argentina) Andrés Molteni	6–4, 6–4
Loss	20–24	Oct 2024	Swiss Indoors, Switzerland	500 Series	Hard (i)	(Croatia) Nikola Mektić	(United Kingdom) Jamie Murray (Australia) John Peers	3–6, 5–7
Win	21–24	Nov 2024	Paris Masters, France (2)	Masters 1000	Hard (i)	(Croatia) Nikola Mektić	(United Kingdom) Lloyd Glasspool (Czech Republic) Adam Pavlásek	3–6, 6–3, [10–5]

== ATP Challenger Tour titles ==
=== Doubles: 14 ===
Date	Tournament	Surface	Partner	Opponents	Score
17 November 2013	Guayaquil, Ecuador	Clay	(Netherlands) Stephan Fransen	(Moldova) Roman Borvanov (Germany) Alexander Satschko	1–6, 6–2, [10–5]
27 July 2014	Oberstaufen, Germany	Clay	(Italy) Alessandro Motti	(Moldova) Radu Albot (Poland) Mateusz Kowalczyk	7–6^{(9–7)}, 6–3
6 February 2015	Glasgow, United Kingdom	Hard (i)	(Netherlands) Matwé Middelkoop	(Ukraine) Sergei Bubka (Kazakhstan) Aleksandr Nedovyesov	6–1, 6–4
2 May 2015	Turin, Italy	Clay	(Netherlands) Matwé Middelkoop	(Croatia) Dino Marcan (Croatia) Antonio Šančić	4–6, 6–3, [10–5]
4. July 2015	Marburg, Germany	Clay	(Netherlands) Matwé Middelkoop	(Germany) Tobias Kamke (Germany) Simon Stadler	6–1, 7–5
15 August 2015	Prague, Czech Republic	Clay	(Netherlands) Matwé Middelkoop	(Belarus) Sergey Betov (Russia) Mikhail Elgin	6–4, 3–6, [10–7]
11 September 2015	Seville, Spain	Clay	(Netherlands) Matwé Middelkoop	(Italy) Marco Bortolotti (Poland) Kamil Majchrzak	7–6^{(7–5)}, 6–4
26 September 2015	Trnava, Slovakia	Clay	(Netherlands) Matwé Middelkoop	(Poland) Kamil Majchrzak (France) Stéphane Robert	6–4, 6–2
25 October 2015	Brest, France	Hard (i)	(Netherlands) Matwé Middelkoop	(United Kingdom) Ken Skupski (United Kingdom) Neal Skupski	3–6, 6–4, [10–6]
16 January 2016	Bangkok, Thailand	Hard	(Netherlands) Matwé Middelkoop	(Germany) Gero Kretschmer (Germany) Alexander Satschko	6–3, 7–6^{(7–1)}
19 June 2016	Ilkley, United Kingdom	Grass	(Netherlands) Matwé Middelkoop	(Brazil) Marcelo Demoliner (Pakistan) Aisam-ul-Haq Qureshi	7–6^{(7–5)}, 0–6, [10–8]
31 July 2016	Scheveningen, Netherlands	Clay	(Netherlands) Matwé Middelkoop	(Netherlands) Tallon Griekspoor (Netherlands) Tim van Rijthoven	6–1, 3–6, [13–11]
26 November 2016	Andria, Italy	Carpet (i)	(Netherlands) Matwé Middelkoop	(Czech Republic) Roman Jebavý (Czech Republic) Zdeněk Kolář	6–3, 6–3
13 May 2017	Aix-en-Provence, France	Clay	(Netherlands) Matwé Middelkoop	(Germany) Andre Begemann (France) Jérémy Chardy	2–6, 6–4, [16–14]

== Doubles performance timeline ==
Key
W	F	SF	QF	#R	RR	Q#	P#	DNQ	A	Z#	PO	G	S	B	NMS	NTI	P	NH

(W) winner; (F) finalist; (SF) semifinalist; (QF) quarterfinalist; (#R) rounds 4, 3, 2, 1; (RR) round-robin stage; (Q#) qualification round; (P#) preliminary round; (DNQ) did not qualify; (A) absent; (Z#) Davis/Fed Cup Zonal Group (with number indication) or (PO) play-off; (G) gold, (S) silver or (B) bronze Olympic/Paralympic medal; (NMS) not a Masters tournament; (NTI) not a Tier I tournament; (P) postponed; (NH) not held; (SR) strike rate (events won / competed); (W–L) win–loss record.
To avoid confusion and double counting, these charts are updated at the conclusion of a tournament or when the player's participation has ended.

=== Doubles ===
Tournament	2013	2014	2015	2016	2017	2018	2019	2020	2021	2022	2023	2024	SR	W–L
Grand Slam tournaments
Australian Open	A	A	A	A	2R	2R	2R	2R	3R	QF	QF	3R	0 / 8	14–8
French Open	A	A	A	1R	1R	3R	2R	SF	3R	QF	QF	2R	0 / 9	16–9
Wimbledon	A	A	Q1	2R	1R	1R	QF	NH	1R	3R	W	2R	1 / 8	13–7
US Open	A	A	A	1R	1R	2R	3R	F	3R	F	3R	QF	0 / 9	19–9
Overall win–loss	0–0	0–0	0–0	1–3	1–4	4–4	7–4	9–3	6–4	13–4	14–3	7–4	1 / 34	62–33
Year-end championship
ATP Finals	Did not qualify							W	DNQ	SF	RR	RR	1 / 4	8–7
ATP World Tour Masters 1000
Indian Wells Masters	A	A	A	A	A	A	1R	NH	2R	QF	F	W	1 / 5	11–4
Miami Open	A	A	A	A	A	A	F	NH	1R	F	QF	2R	0 / 5	11–5
Monte-Carlo Masters	A	A	A	A	A	A	F	NH	2R	1R	QF	2R	0 / 5	6–5
Madrid Open	A	A	A	A	A	A	SF	NH	QF	W	QF	1R	1 / 5	12–4
Italian Open	A	A	A	A	A	A	1R	2R	QF	QF	SF	QF	0 / 6	10–6
Canadian Open	A	A	A	A	A	A	F	NH	2R	W	2R	A	1 / 4	9–3
Cincinnati Masters	A	A	A	A	A	A	1R	QF	2R	2R	2R	2R	0 / 6	4–6
Shanghai Masters	A	A	A	A	A	A	1R	NH			QF	W	1 / 3	8–2
Paris Masters	A	A	A	A	A	1R	1R	QF	1R	W	QF	W	2 / 7	10–5
Win–loss	0–0	0–0	0–0	0–0	0–0	0–1	15–9	4–3	8–8	21–5	14–9	18–5	6 / 46	80–40
Win–loss
Tournaments	1	1	3	17	22	27	26	14	21	21	25	24	202	
Titles	0	0	0	2	1	0	1	2	1	7	2	5	21	
Finals	0	0	0	2	4	4	7	4	2	10	5	7	45	
Overall win–loss	0–1	0–1	2–3	13–15	18–21	29–27	42–27	28–13	24–19	58-21	47–25	48–22	309–195	
Year-end ranking	161	221	67	60	46	42	14	5	21	1	8	8	61.31%	

=== Mixed doubles ===
Tournament	2017	2018	2019	2020	2021	2022	2023	SR
Australian Open	A	A	1R	1R	1R	2R	1R	0 / 5
French Open	A	A	1R	NH	SF	W	A	1 / 3
Wimbledon	1R	A	SF	NH	2R	A	2R	0 / 4
US Open	A	QF	QF	NH	A	A	A	0 / 2
