= 2022 Rolex Paris Masters – Singles =

Singles
- 2022 Rolex Paris Masters

Final
- Champion: (Denmark) Holger Rune
- Runner-up: (Serbia) Novak Djokovic
- Score: 3–6, 6–3, 7–5

Details
- Draw: 56 (7 Q / 4 WC )
- Seeds: 16

Events
Singles	Doubles
- Rolex Paris Masters

Holger Rune defeated defending champion Novak Djokovic in the final, 3–6, 6–3, 7–5 to win the singles tennis title at the 2022 Paris Masters. It was his first Masters 1000 title, and he saved three match points en route, in the first round against Stan Wawrinka. Rune made his top 10 debut in the ATP rankings with the win, and he defeated five top-10-ranked players en route to the title. This was Rune's fourth final in a row, and his third title. He was the second teenager to win a Masters 1000 title in the 2022 season, after Carlos Alcaraz at Miami and Madrid. Rune was the first Scandinavian to win a Masters 1000 title since Robin Söderling at the 2010 Paris Masters, as well as the first Dane to win a Masters title. It was Djokovic's first loss in a Masters 1000 final after winning the first set, having previously been 30–0.

This tournament marked the final professional appearance of former world No. 6 Gilles Simon; he lost in the third round to Félix Auger-Aliassime.

Auger-Aliassime was attempting to win his fourth tournament in as many weeks, but lost in the semifinals to Rune in a rematch of the Swiss Indoors final from the previous week, snapping his winning streak at 16 matches.

Rafael Nadal and Alcaraz were both in contention for the world No. 1 singles ranking at the beginning of the tournament. Following Nadal's second round loss to Tommy Paul, Alcaraz retained the No. 1 ranking.

== Seeds ==
The top eight seeds received a bye into the second round.

1. (Spain) Carlos Alcaraz (quarterfinals, retired)
2. (Spain) Rafael Nadal (second round)
3. (Norway) Casper Ruud (third round)
4. Daniil Medvedev (second round)
5. (Greece) Stefanos Tsitsipas (semifinals)
6. (Serbia) Novak Djokovic (final)
7. Andrey Rublev (third round)
8. (Canada) Félix Auger-Aliassime (semifinals)
9. (United States) Taylor Fritz (second round)
10. (Poland) Hubert Hurkacz (second round)
11. (Italy) Jannik Sinner (first round)
12. (United Kingdom) Cameron Norrie (second round)
13. (Italy) Matteo Berrettini (withdrew)
14. (Spain) Pablo Carreño Busta (third round)
15. (Croatia) Marin Čilić (first round)
16. (United States) Frances Tiafoe (quarterfinals)

Click on the seed number of a player to go to their draw section.

== Draw ==
Key

- Q = Qualifier
- WC = Wild card
- LL = Lucky loser
- Alt = Alternate
- ITF = ITF entry
- PR = Protected ranking
- SR = Special ranking
- SE = Special exempt
- JE = Junior exempt
- JR = Junior Accelerator Programme entrant
- CO = College Accelerator Programme entrant
- NG = Next Gen Accelerator Program entrant
- w/o = Walkover
- r = Retired
- d = Defaulted

=== Finals ===
Quarterfinals
1	(Spain) Carlos Alcaraz	3	6^{r}
(Denmark) Holger Rune	6	6
16	(United States) Frances Tiafoe	1	4
8	(Canada) Félix Auger-Aliassime	6	6
6	(Serbia) Novak Djokovic	6	6
(Italy) Lorenzo Musetti	0	3
5	(Greece) Stefanos Tsitsipas	6	6
(United States) Tommy Paul	2	4

Semifinals
(Denmark) Holger Rune	6	6
8	(Canada) Félix Auger-Aliassime	4	2
6	(Serbia) Novak Djokovic	6	3	7^{7}
5	(Greece) Stefanos Tsitsipas	2	6	6^{4}

Final
(Denmark) Holger Rune	3	6	7
6	(Serbia) Novak Djokovic	6	3	5

=== Top half ===
==== Section 1 ====
First round
A Karatsev	3	4
(Japan) Y Nishioka	6	6
(Netherlands) B van de Zandschulp	6^{5}	6^{5}
(Bulgaria) G Dimitrov	7^{7}	7^{7}
Q	(France) A Fils	6^{5}	7^{7}	2
LL	(Italy) F Fognini	7^{7}	6^{4}	6
10	(Poland) H Hurkacz	7^{7}	6
WC	(France) A Mannarino	6^{5}	4
(Denmark) H Rune	4	7	7^{7}
PR	(Switzerland) S Wawrinka	6	5	6^{3}
(United States) J Isner	6	7^{7}
Q	(Germany) O Otte	4	6^{3}

Second round
1	(Spain) C Alcaraz	6	6
(Japan) Y Nishioka	4	4
(Bulgaria) G Dimitrov	6	7
LL	(Italy) F Fognini	0	5
10	(Poland) H Hurkacz	5	1
(Denmark) H Rune	7	6
(United States) J Isner	2	3
7	A Rublev	6	6

Third round
1	(Spain) C Alcaraz	6	6
(Bulgaria) G Dimitrov	1	3
(Denmark) H Rune	6	7
7	A Rublev	4	5

Quarterfinals
1	(Spain) C Alcaraz	3	6^{r}
(Denmark) H Rune	6	6

==== Section 2 ====
First round
(United States) S Korda	4	6	4
(Australia) A de Minaur	6	4	6
WC	(France) A Rinderknech	3	4
(United Kingdom) J Draper	6	6
Q	(Italy) L Sonego	4	4
16	(United States) F Tiafoe	6	6
9	(United States) T Fritz	7	6
(Spain) A Davidovich Fokina	5	2
(United Kingdom) A Murray	6	5	3
WC	(France) G Simon	4	7	6
(Kazakhstan) A Bublik	1	7^{7}	4
Q	(Sweden) M Ymer	6	6^{2}	6

Second round
4	D Medvedev	4	6	5
(Australia) A de Minaur	6	2	7
(United Kingdom) J Draper	3	5
16	(United States) F Tiafoe	6	7
9	(United States) T Fritz	5	7	4
WC	(France) G Simon	7	5	6
Q	(Sweden) M Ymer	7^{8}	4	6^{6}
8	(Canada) F Auger-Aliassime	6^{6}	6	7^{8}

Third round
(Australia) A de Minaur	3	6^{5}
16	(United States) F Tiafoe	6	7^{7}
WC	(France) G Simon	1	3
8	(Canada) F Auger-Aliassime	6	6

Quarterfinals
16	(United States) F Tiafoe	1	4
8	(Canada) F Auger-Aliassime	6	6

=== Bottom half ===
==== Section 3 ====
First round
(Argentina) D Schwartzman	3	3
(United States) M Cressy	6	6
(Argentina) S Báez	1	1
K Khachanov	6	6
Q	(Switzerland) M-A Hüsler	6	6
11	(Italy) J Sinner	2	3
15	(Croatia) M Čilić	4	4
(Italy) L Musetti	6	6
(Georgia (country)) N Basilashvili	6	6
Q	(France) Q Halys	3	4
(Slovakia) A Molčan	3	1
WC	(France) R Gasquet	6	6

Second round
6	(Serbia) N Djokovic	7^{7}	6
(United States) M Cressy	6^{1}	4
K Khachanov	6	4	6
Q	(Switzerland) M-A Hüsler	3	6	4
(Italy) L Musetti	6	6
(Georgia (country)) N Basilashvili	4	2
WC	(France) R Gasquet	1	6^{7}
3	(Norway) C Ruud	6	7^{9}

Third round
6	(Serbia) N Djokovic	6	6
K Khachanov	4	1
(Italy) L Musetti	4	6	6
3	(Norway) C Ruud	6	4	4

Quarterfinals
6	(Serbia) N Djokovic	6	6
(Italy) L Musetti	0	3

==== Section 4 ====
First round
(United Kingdom) D Evans	6	3	6
(United States) B Nakashima	3	6	4
Q	(France) C Moutet	3	6	6
(Croatia) B Ćorić	6	3	4
(Serbia) M Kecmanović	2	4
12	(United Kingdom) C Norrie	6	6
14	(Spain) P Carreño Busta	6	6
(Spain) A Ramos Viñolas	3	3
(Canada) D Shapovalov	6^{2}	6	6
(Argentina) F Cerúndolo	7^{7}	3	4
(Spain) R Bautista Agut	4	4
(United States) T Paul	6	6

Second round
5	(Greece) S Tsitsipas	6	6
(United Kingdom) D Evans	3	4
Q	(France) C Moutet	6	5	7^{7}
12	(United Kingdom) C Norrie	3	7	6^{3}
14	(Spain) P Carreño Busta	7^{7}	2	6
(Canada) D Shapovalov	6^{2}	6	4
(United States) T Paul	3	7^{7}	6
2	(Spain) R Nadal	6	6^{4}	1

Third round
5	(Greece) S Tsitsipas	6	7^{7}
Q	(France) C Moutet	3	6^{3}
14	(Spain) P Carreño Busta	4	4
(United States) T Paul	6	6

Quarterfinals
5	(Greece) S Tsitsipas	6	6
(United States) T Paul	2	4

== Qualifying ==
=== Seeds ===
1. (Finland) Emil Ruusuvuori (first round)
2. (Italy) Lorenzo Sonego (qualified)
3. (Belgium) David Goffin (first round)
4. (Germany) Oscar Otte (qualified)
5. (Argentina) Pedro Cachin (first round)
6. (Spain) Jaume Munar (first round)
7. (United States) Marcos Giron (first round)
8. (Italy) Fabio Fognini (qualifying competition, lucky loser)
9. (Spain) Pedro Martínez (first round)
10. (Switzerland) Marc-Andrea Hüsler (qualified)
11. (France) Corentin Moutet (qualified)
12. (United States) Mackenzie McDonald (first round)
13. (Brazil) Thiago Monteiro (qualifying competition)
14. (France) Constant Lestienne (first round, retired)

=== Qualifiers ===
1. (France) Corentin Moutet
2. (Italy) Lorenzo Sonego
3. (Switzerland) Marc-Andrea Hüsler
4. (Germany) Oscar Otte
5. (France) Quentin Halys
6. (France) Arthur Fils
7. (Sweden) Mikael Ymer

=== Lucky loser ===
1. (Italy) Fabio Fognini

=== Draw ===
==== First qualifier ====
First round
1	(Finland) Emil Ruusuvuori	6	3	2
WC	(France) Geoffrey Blancaneaux	3	6	6
WC	(France) Ugo Humbert	3	4
11	(France) Corentin Moutet	6	6

Qualifying competition
WC	(France) Geoffrey Blancaneaux	2	6	4
11	(France) Corentin Moutet	6	3	6

==== Second qualifier ====
First round
2	(Italy) Lorenzo Sonego	6	7^{11}
(Portugal) João Sousa	4	6^{9}
(Netherlands) Tallon Griekspoor	6	3	7^{7}
12/Alt	(United States) Mackenzie McDonald	3	6	6^{4}

Qualifying competition
2	(Italy) Lorenzo Sonego	3	6	7^{7}
(Netherlands) Tallon Griekspoor	6	4	6^{3}

==== Third qualifier ====
First round
3	(Belgium) David Goffin	3	6^{1}
(Serbia) Laslo Đere	6	7^{7}
(France) Hugo Gaston	3	6	6^{5}
10	(Switzerland) Marc-Andrea Hüsler	6	3	7^{7}

Qualifying competition
(Serbia) Laslo Đere	6^{5}	5
10	(Switzerland) Marc-Andrea Hüsler	7^{7}	7

==== Fourth qualifier ====
First round
4	(Germany) Oscar Otte	6	6
Ilya Ivashka	2	2
(Spain) Bernabé Zapata Miralles	6	4	6
9	(Spain) Pedro Martínez	0	6	0

Qualifying competition
4	(Germany) Oscar Otte	6	6
(Spain) Bernabé Zapata Miralles	4	1

==== Fifth qualifier ====
First round
5	(Argentina) Pedro Cachin	6^{7}	3
(France) Quentin Halys	7^{9}	6
WC	(France) Hugo Grenier	6	2	6^{1}
13	(Brazil) Thiago Monteiro	4	6	7^{7}

Qualifying competition
(France) Quentin Halys	6	7
13	(Brazil) Thiago Monteiro	3	5

==== Sixth qualifier ====
First round
6	(Spain) Jaume Munar	3	3
WC	(France) Arthur Fils	6	6
(Colombia) Daniel Elahi Galán	3	6^{6}
8	(Italy) Fabio Fognini	6	7^{8}

Qualifying competition
WC	(France) Arthur Fils	6	3	6
8	(Italy) Fabio Fognini	3	6	4

==== Seventh qualifier ====
First round
7	(United States) Marcos Giron	5	3
(Czech Republic) Jiří Lehečka	7	6
Alt	(Sweden) Mikael Ymer	4	4
14	(France) Constant Lestienne	6	2^{r}

Qualifying competition
(Czech Republic) Jiří Lehečka	6^{6}	2
Alt	(Sweden) Mikael Ymer	7^{8}	6
