= 2022 National Bank Open – Men's doubles =

Men's doubles
- 2022 National Bank Open

Final
- Champions: (Netherlands) Wesley Koolhof (United Kingdom) Neal Skupski
- Runners-up: (United Kingdom) Dan Evans (Australia) John Peers
- Score: 6–2, 4–6, [10–6]

Details
- Draw: 28
- Seeds: 8

Events
Singles	men	women
Doubles	men	women
- National Bank Open

Wesley Koolhof and Neal Skupski defeated Dan Evans and John Peers in the final, 6–2, 4–6, [10–6] to win the men's doubles tennis title at the 2022 Canadian Open. It marked their second ATP Masters 1000 title together and sixth title of the season.

Rajeev Ram and Joe Salisbury were the defending champions, but lost in the second round to Ariel Behar and Gonzalo Escobar.

== Seeds ==
The top four seeds received a bye into the second round.

1. (United States) Rajeev Ram / (United Kingdom) Joe Salisbury (second round)
2. (Spain) Marcel Granollers / (Argentina) Horacio Zeballos (quarterfinals)
3. (Netherlands) Wesley Koolhof / (United Kingdom) Neal Skupski (champions)
4. (El Salvador) Marcelo Arévalo / (Netherlands) Jean-Julien Rojer (quarterfinals)
5. (Croatia) Nikola Mektić / (Croatia) Mate Pavić (second round)
6. (Germany) Tim Pütz / (New Zealand) Michael Venus (first round)
7. (Croatia) Ivan Dodig / (United States) Austin Krajicek (first round)
8. (Colombia) Juan Sebastián Cabal / (Colombia) Robert Farah (first round)

== Draw ==
Key

- Q = Qualifier
- WC = Wild card
- LL = Lucky loser
- Alt = Alternate
- ITF = ITF entry
- PR = Protected ranking
- SR = Special ranking
- SE = Special exempt
- JE = Junior exempt
- JR = Junior Accelerator Programme entrant
- CO = College Accelerator Programme entrant
- NG = Next Gen Accelerator Program entrant
- w/o = Walkover
- r = Retired
- d = Defaulted

=== Finals ===
Semifinals
(Germany) Kevin Krawietz (Germany) Andreas Mies	6	2	[8]
3	(Netherlands) Wesley Koolhof (United Kingdom) Neal Skupski	3	6	[10]
(Poland) Hubert Hurkacz (Poland) Jan Zieliński	5	6	[4]
(United Kingdom) Dan Evans (Australia) John Peers	7	4	[10]

Final
3	(Netherlands) Wesley Koolhof (United Kingdom) Neal Skupski	6	4	[10]
(United Kingdom) Dan Evans (Australia) John Peers	2	6	[6]

=== Top half ===
First round
(Spain) P Carreño Busta (Brazil) M Melo	2	6^{4}
(Uruguay) A Behar (Ecuador) G Escobar	6	7^{7}
(Germany) K Krawietz (Germany) A Mies	4	6	[10]
PR	(Poland) Ł Kubot (Switzerland) S Wawrinka	6	1	[5]
(Mexico) S González (Argentina) A Molteni	7	6
8	(Colombia) JS Cabal (Colombia) R Farah	5	1
(Australia) A de Minaur (United Kingdom) C Norrie	7	6
Alt	(Argentina) F Cerúndolo (Argentina) D Schwartzman	5	0
WC	(Canada) L Draxl (Canada) C Harper	4	1
(Italy) S Bolelli (Italy) F Fognini	6	6
(United Kingdom) L Glasspool (Finland) H Heliövaara	6	6
7	(Croatia) I Dodig (United States) A Krajicek	4	2

Second round
1	(United States) R Ram (United Kingdom) J Salisbury	4	6^{3}
(Uruguay) A Behar (Ecuador) G Escobar	6	7^{7}
(Germany) K Krawietz (Germany) A Mies	6	6
(Mexico) S González (Argentina) A Molteni	4	4
3	(Netherlands) W Koolhof (United Kingdom) N Skupski	6	6
(Australia) A de Minaur (United Kingdom) C Norrie	3	4
(Italy) S Bolelli (Italy) F Fognini	3	4
(United Kingdom) L Glasspool (Finland) H Heliövaara	6	6

Quarterfinals
(Uruguay) A Behar (Ecuador) G Escobar	2	5
(Germany) K Krawietz (Germany) A Mies	6	7
3	(Netherlands) W Koolhof (United Kingdom) N Skupski	4	6	[10]
(United Kingdom) L Glasspool (Finland) H Heliövaara	6	3	[8]

Semifinals
(Germany) K Krawietz (Germany) A Mies	6	2	[8]
3	(Netherlands) W Koolhof (United Kingdom) N Skupski	3	6	[10]

=== Bottom half ===
First round
6	(Germany) T Pütz (New Zealand) M Venus	3	6^{4}
(Poland) H Hurkacz (Poland) J Zieliński	6	7^{7}
K Khachanov (Canada) D Shapovalov	6^{5}	6	[6]
(India) R Bopanna (Netherlands) M Middelkoop	7^{7}	4	[10]
(France) B Bonzi (France) G Monfils	4	6	[10]
WC	(Canada) V Pospisil (Italy) J Sinner	6	2	[8]
5	(Croatia) N Mektić (Croatia) M Pavić	3	6	[10]
PR	(France) N Mahut (France) É Roger-Vasselin	6	4	[7]
(United Kingdom) J Murray (Brazil) B Soares	6	3	[5]
(United Kingdom) D Evans (Australia) J Peers	4	6	[10]
(Bulgaria) G Dimitrov; A Rublev	3	6	[10]
(Australia) M Ebden (Australia) M Purcell	6	2	[8]

Second round
(Poland) H Hurkacz (Poland) J Zieliński	6	6^{3}	[12]
(India) R Bopanna (Netherlands) M Middelkoop	1	7^{7}	[10]
(France) B Bonzi (France) G Monfils
4	(El Salvador) M Arévalo (Netherlands) J-J Rojer	w/o
5	(Croatia) N Mektić (Croatia) M Pavić	6	3	[12]
(United Kingdom) D Evans (Australia) J Peers	2	6	[14]
(Bulgaria) G Dimitrov; A Rublev	4	2
2	(Spain) M Granollers (Argentina) H Zeballos	6	6

Quarterfinals
(Poland) H Hurkacz (Poland) J Zieliński	7^{7}	6
4	(El Salvador) M Arévalo (Netherlands) J-J Rojer	6^{2}	4
(United Kingdom) D Evans (Australia) J Peers	7^{7}	7^{7}
2	(Spain) M Granollers (Argentina) H Zeballos	6^{3}	6^{3}

Semifinals
(Poland) H Hurkacz (Poland) J Zieliński	5	6	[4]
(United Kingdom) D Evans (Australia) J Peers	7	4	[10]

== Seeded teams ==
The following are the seeded teams, based on ATP rankings as of August 1, 2022.

Country	Player	Country	Player	Rank^{1}	Seed
USA	Rajeev Ram	GBR	Joe Salisbury	3	1
ESP	Marcel Granollers	ARG	Horacio Zeballos	7	2
NED	Wesley Koolhof	GBR	Neal Skupski	11	3
ESA	Marcelo Arévalo	NED	Jean-Julien Rojer	17	4
CRO	Nikola Mektić	CRO	Mate Pavić	19	5
GER	Tim Pütz	NZL	Michael Venus	21	6
CRO	Ivan Dodig	USA	Austin Krajicek	35	7
COL	Juan Sebastián Cabal	COL	Robert Farah	40	8

== Other entry information ==
=== Wild cards ===
- (Canada) Liam Draxl / (Canada) Cleeve Harper
- (Canada) Vasek Pospisil / (Italy) Jannik Sinner
- (Canada) ~~Marko Stakusic~~ / (Canada) ~~Jaden Weekes~~

=== Alternates ===
- (Argentina) Francisco Cerúndolo / (Argentina) Diego Schwartzman

=== Protected ranking ===
- (Poland) Łukasz Kubot / (Switzerland) Stan Wawrinka
- (France) Nicolas Mahut / (France) Édouard Roger-Vasselin

=== Withdrawals ===
- (Poland) Hubert Hurkacz / (United States) John Isner → replaced by (Poland) Hubert Hurkacz / (Poland) Jan Zieliński
- (Canada) Marko Stakusic / (Canada) Jaden Weekes → replaced by (Argentina) Francisco Cerúndolo / (Argentina) Diego Schwartzman
