= Neal Skupski =

British tennis player (born 1989)

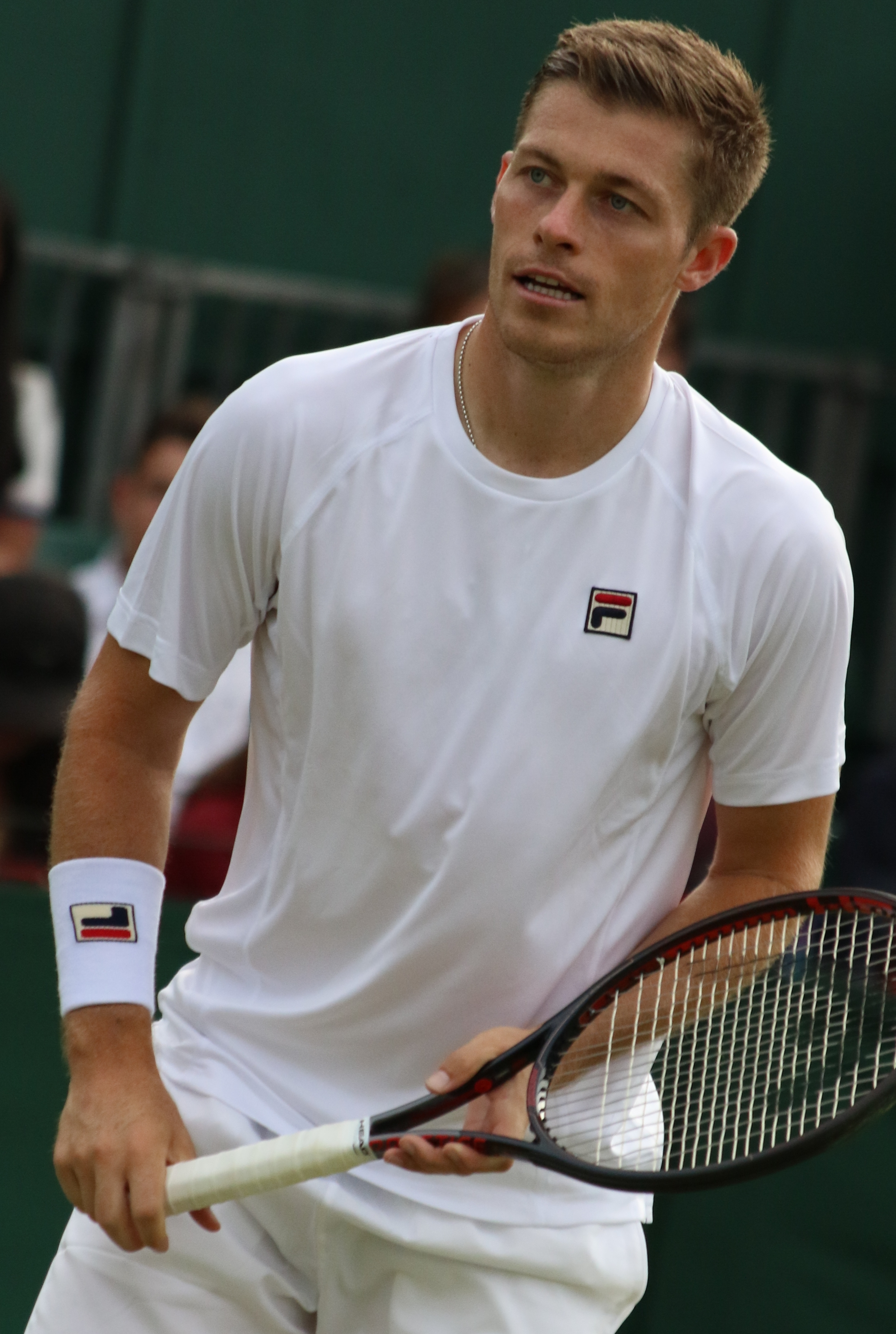
- Skupski at the 2019 Wimbledon Championships
- Country (sports): Great Britain
- Residence: Liverpool, England
- Born: 1 December 1989 (age 36) Liverpool, England
- Height: 6 ft 0 in (183 cm)
- Turned pro: 2012
- Plays: Right-handed (two-handed backhand)
- College: LSU
- Coach: Ken Skupski; Louis Cayer
- Prize money: US $7,694,492

Singles
- Career record: 0–0
- Career titles: 0
- Highest ranking: No. 932 (8 November 2010)

Doubles
- Career record: 376–234
- Career titles: 19
- Highest ranking: No. 1 (14 November 2022)
- Current ranking: No. 3 (9 November 2026)

Grand Slam doubles results
- Australian Open: W (2026)
- French Open: F (2025)
- Wimbledon: W (2023)
- US Open: W (2026)

Other doubles tournaments
- Tour Finals: F (2025)
- Olympic Games: 2R (2021)

Mixed doubles
- Career record: 49–27
- Career titles: 2

Grand Slam mixed doubles results
- Australian Open: F (2024)
- French Open: F (2024)
- Wimbledon: W (2021, 2022)
- US Open: QF (2021)

Team competitions
- Davis Cup: SF (2019)
- Last updated on: 9 November 2026.

Neal Skupski (born 1 December 1989) is a British professional tennis player who specializes in doubles. He has a career-high doubles ranking of world No. 1 by the ATP. He first achieved this milestone in November 2022, topping the rankings jointly with long-time partner Wesley Koolhof. He became the third British world no. 1 in doubles after Jamie Murray and Joe Salisbury.

Skupski is a five-time Grand Slam doubles champion, having won the 2023 Wimbledon Championships partnering Wesley Koolhof and winning the 2026 Australian Open and 2026 US Open partnering Christian Harrison. In mixed doubles, Skupski earned the 2021 and 2022 Wimbledon Championships titles, playing alongside Desirae Krawczyk. Koolhof and Skupski were also runners-up at the 2022 US Open, and Krawczyk and Skupski reached the final at the 2024 Australian Open and 2024 French Open. He has won 18 doubles titles on the ATP Tour, including the Madrid Open, Canadian Open and Paris Masters at ATP Masters 1000 level in 2022.

Skupski has represented Great Britain in the Davis Cup since 2019 and competed at the 2020 Summer Olympics. He attended Louisiana State University, where he studied sports administration as well as played college tennis.

== Early life ==
Neal Skupski was born in Liverpool to Mary Skupski and Ken Skupski Sr. and attended King David High School. Neal is the younger brother of fellow tennis player Ken Skupski Jr., with whom he has regularly partnered since 2013 until Ken Jr.'s retirement from professional tennis in July 2022. He competed in a handful of matches in 2010 and 2011, then took a year to finish his degree at LSU.

== Professional career ==
=== 2013: ATP debut, first ATP final, top 100 debut ===
He began competing as a professional in 2013, initially playing on the Futures and Challenger Tours. After playing with a number of partners, he started competing more frequently with his brother Ken from March 2013 onwards. The pair reached the final of the Nottingham Trophy on the Challenger Tour, before winning five Challenger titles in 2013, as of 23 September. These wins saw Neal move into the world top 200 in July 2013.

At the 2013 Kremlin Cup the Skupski brothers entered their first ATP World Tour tournament, progressing to the final, where they lost on a tie-break. Following the final, Neal moved into the top 100 for the first time, having been unranked at the start of the season. He ended 2013 ranked 86th in the world.

=== 2017–2018: First Grand Slam quarterfinal, first two ATP titles ===
At the 2017 Wimbledon Championships he reached the quarterfinals as a wildcard for the first time in his career partnering with his brother Ken where they were defeated by 4th seeded pair Łukasz Kubot and Marcelo Melo.

Skupski won his first ATP Tour title at the Open Sud de France, partnering again with his brother Ken, their first ATP title together. He won his second and biggest title of his career thus far at the ATP 500 2018 Vienna Open partnering with fellow Brit Joe Salisbury.

=== 2019–2020: First Major mixed-doubles & doubles semifinals and Masters final ===
Skupski and Spanish partner María José Martínez Sánchez were defeated in their mixed doubles semifinal at the 2019 Australian Open by third seeded pair and eventual champions Barbora Krejčíková and Rajeev Ram.

Following the 2019 French Open, Skupski formed a partnership with fellow Briton Jamie Murray. With Murray he reached his first Grand Slam semifinal at the 2019 US Open (tennis) where they lost to the top-seeded Colombian pair and eventual champions Juan Sebastián Cabal and Robert Farah.

He made his first Masters 1000 final at the 2020 Western & Southern Open defeating top seeded pair Cabal/Farah in the first round en route before losing to Pablo Carreno Busta and Alex de Minaur in the final, and won his fourth ATP doubles title at the 2020 Sofia Open by a walkover from Jürgen Melzer and Édouard Roger-Vasselin.

The pair Skupski/Murray also reached the quarterfinals at the French Open, which was Neal's first showing at this level at this Major and third overall and again the quarterfinals at the US Open.

=== 2021: Top 15 debut and Wimbledon mixed-doubles champion, Olympics debut ===
In March, Skupski won his fifth ATP title with his brother Ken at the Mexican Open. Two weeks later, he reached his second Masters-1000 final with compatriot Dan Evans at the Miami Open and entered the top 20 in the doubles rankings for the first time. Again two weeks later and partnering with Dan Evans, he reached his third Masters 1000 final at the Monte-Carlo Masters and climbed to a career-high ranking in doubles of world No. 16 on 19 April 2021. On 11 July 2021, partnering with Desirae Krawczyk, he won the Wimbledon mixed-doubles final. He reached the top 15 in doubles on 12 July 2021.

At the 2021 San Diego Open Skupski won his sixth title and second of the season partnering Joe Salisbury.

=== 2022: Partnership with Koolhof, Four ATP & Three Masters & mixed doubles titles, World No. 1 ===
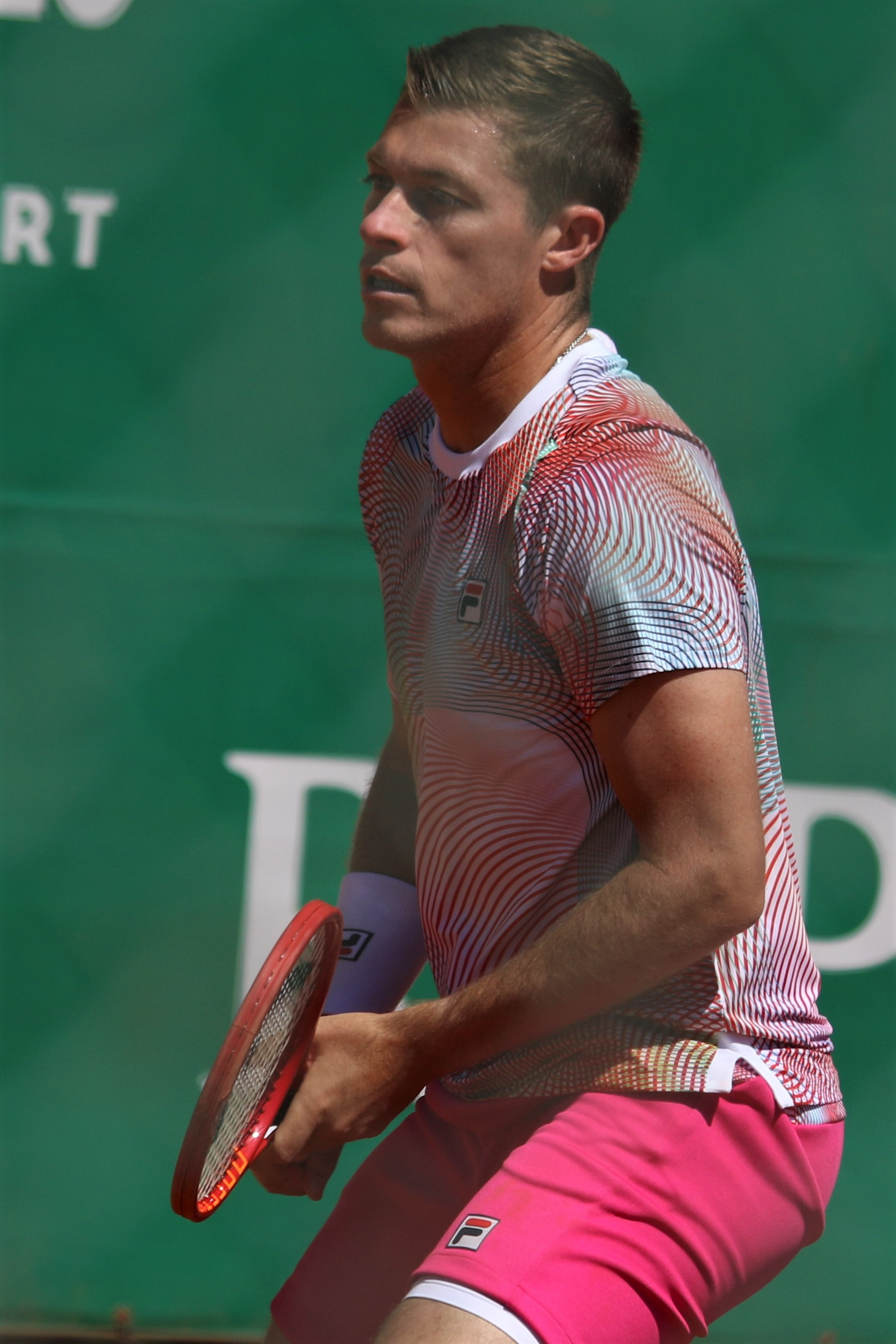
Skupski (pictured at the 2022 Monte-Carlo Masters) ended 2022 as joint-world No. 1 with new partner Wesley Koolhof

Partnering with Wesley Koolhof he won two ATP 250 titles during the Australian Summer swing, before the 2022 Australian Open. The pair reached the quarterfinals at the first Grand Slam of the year for the first time at this Major. They won their third title at the 2022 Qatar ExxonMobil Open dropping only one set en route to the final where they defeated Rohan Bopanna and Denis Shapovalov in straight sets. He reached the final of the 2022 Miami Open with Koolhof where they lost to John Isner and Hubert Hurkacz.

Seeded seventh, they reached their second Masters 1000 final at the 2022 Mutua Madrid Open after defeating John Isner and Hubert Hurkacz. In the final they defeated fifth seeds Robert Farah and Juan Sebastián Cabal to win their first Masters 1000 title in their career and as a pair.

At the 2022 French Open he reached the quarterfinals with Koolhof for the second time at this Major, defeating unseeded pair of Americans Tommy Paul and Mackenzie McDonald. As a result, Skupski entered the top 10 of the ATP rankings in doubles for the first time on 6 June 2022.

At the 2022 Wimbledon Championships he successfully defended and won his second Major title in mixed doubles again partnering Desirae Krawczyk. They defeated Matthew Ebden and Samantha Stosur in straight sets. He reached the top 5 in the doubles rankings on 18 July 2022.

At the 2022 National Bank Open he reached with Koolhof the semifinals of a Masters 1000 for the third time in the season defeating Lloyd Glasspool/Harri Heliövaara. Next the pair advanced to the eight final of the season defeating Krawietz/Mies. They won their sixth title defeating Dan Evans and John Peers. As a result, he moved to world No. 4 in the doubles rankings on 15 August 2022 and to No. 3 on 22 August 2022.

Seeded 2nd at the US Open the pair reached the quarterfinals defeating Wimbledon champions Australian pair of Ebden/Purcell in three sets. Next they defeated Marcelo Demoliner and Joao Sousa to reach the semifinals. In the semifinals, they defeated Marcelo Arevalo and Jean-Julien Rojer. In the finals, they lost in straight sets to Rajeev Ram and Joe Salisbury. At the 2022 Rolex Paris Masters the pair Koolhof/Skupski reached the semifinals defeating ninth seeds Rohan Bopanna/Matwe Middelkoop climbing to World No. 1 and World No. 2 and solidifying the No. 1 position as a pair in the doubles race. They reached their 10th final and fourth at a Masters level for the season defeating seventh seeds Lloyd Glasspool /Harri Heliövaara. They won their third Masters title and seventh title for the season defeating eight seeds Ivan Dodig/Austin Krajicek in the final. They also clinched the No. 1 year-end ranking as a team. Skupski became joint world No. 1 with Koolhof in doubles on 14 November 2022.

=== 2023: Wimbledon champion, Indian Wells finalist ===
The world No. 1 duo Koolhof and Skupski continued their good form reaching yet another Masters final at the 2023 BNP Paribas Open where they lost to Rohan Bopanna and Matthew Ebden.

At the 2023 French Open he reached the quarterfinals with Wesley Koolhof for the third time in his career. He lost to the 10th seeded team of Horacio Zeballos and Marcel Granollers.

He won his first Grand Slam title at the 2023 Wimbledon Championships with Koolhof and returned to the No. 1 ranking.

=== 2024: Two Grand Slam mixed doubles finals ===
Skupski and Desirae Krawczyk reached the mixed doubles final at the Australian Open in January losing to Hsieh Su-wei and Jan Zielinski 6-7 (5-7) 6-4 11-9. The pair also suffered similar disappointment at the French Open in June, when they lost out in the final 6-4 7–5 to Laura Siegemund and Edouard Roger-Vasselin.

At the Queen's Club Championships, he combined with Michael Venus to win the doubles title, defeating Taylor Fritz and Karen Khachanov in the final.

=== 2025: French and US Open finals, 300th ATP win ===
In February, Skupski and new regular playing partner Joe Salisbury reached the final at the Qatar Open, losing to fellow Britons Julian Cash and Lloyd Glasspool in straight sets. They were also runners-up at the Barcelona Open in April, losing to Sander Arends and Luke Johnson in the final. During the tournament Skupski recorded his 300th win on the ATP Tour.

Skupski and Salisbury were runners-up at the French Open, losing in the final to Marcel Granollers and Horacio Zeballos in three sets.

In August, they made it to the final at the Canadian Open, but lost to second seeds Julian Cash and Lloyd Glasspool.

They reached the final at the US Open, but, in a repeat of the French Open final earlier that year, lost to Marcel Granollers and Horacio Zeballos in three sets despite having three championship points during the match.

Skupski and Salisbury went unbeaten to top their group at the season-ending ATP Finals in Turin and then defeated world No. 1 pairing Julian Cash and Lloyd Glasspool in the semifinals, before losing to Harri Heliövaara and Henry Patten in the final in straight sets. Two days after the final, Salisbury announced he was taking a break from tennis until at least April 2026 due to anxiety and it was revealed that Skupski would begin the new season playing alongside Christian Harrison.

=== 2026: Australian and US Open doubles titles ===
Seeded sixth, and playing just their second tournament together, Skupski and Christian Harrison won the Australian Open, defeating wildcard entrants Jason Kubler and Marc Polmans in the final. In September, they defeated Kevin Krawietz and Tim Pütz in the final to win the US Open. Two months later, Skupski and Harrison reached the final at the Paris Masters but lost to wildcard pairing Quentin Halys and Pierre-Hugues Herbert. Seeded second at the ATP Finals, they made it through to the semifinals, at which point they lost to Marcelo Arévalo and Mate Pavić.

== World TeamTennis ==
Skupski has played five seasons with World TeamTennis starting in 2015 when he made his league debut with the California Dream. He has since played four seasons (2016-2019) for the New York Empire. Skupski was a part of the New York Empire, who claimed the King Trophy during 2020 WTT season at The Greenbrier.

== Personal life ==
Skupski is the younger brother of former tennis player Ken Skupski and the pair regularly competed together until 2021, winning the 2021 Mexican Open.

Skupski has stated that he is an avid and lifelong Liverpool F.C. fan; he had on occasion asked for Liverpool's scoreline during his concurrent tennis matches.

== Performance timelines ==
Key
| W | F | SF | QF | #R | RR | Q# | P# | DNQ | A | Z# | PO | G | S | B | NMS | NTI | P | NH |

(W) winner; (F) finalist; (SF) semifinalist; (QF) quarterfinalist; (#R) rounds 4, 3, 2, 1; (RR) round-robin stage; (Q#) qualification round; (P#) preliminary round; (DNQ) did not qualify; (A) absent; (Z#) Davis/Fed Cup Zonal Group (with number indication) or (PO) play-off; (G) gold, (S) silver or (B) bronze Olympic/Paralympic medal; (NMS) not a Masters tournament; (NTI) not a Tier I tournament; (P) postponed; (NH) not held; (SR) strike rate (events won / competed); (W–L) win–loss record.
To avoid confusion and double counting, these charts are updated at the conclusion of a tournament or when the player's participation has ended.

=== Doubles ===
Current through the 2026 US Open.

| Tournament | 2013 | 2014 | 2015 | 2016 | 2017 | 2018 | 2019 | 2020 | 2021 | 2022 | 2023 | 2024 | 2025 | 2026 | SR | W–L |
|---|---|---|---|---|---|---|---|---|---|---|---|---|---|---|---|---|
Grand Slam tournaments
| Australian Open | A | A | A | A | 1R | 1R | 2R | 2R | 2R | QF | QF | 3R | 2R | W | 1 / 10 | 18–9 |
| French Open | A | 1R | A | A | A | 2R | 2R | QF | 1R | QF | QF | 1R | F | 2R | 0 / 10 | 17–10 |
| Wimbledon | Q1 | 1R | 1R | 2R | QF | 3R | 1R | NH | 2R | 3R | W | SF | QF | 3R | 1 / 12 | 24–11 |
| US Open | A | A | A | A | 1R | 1R | SF | QF | 2R | F | 3R | QF | F | W | 1 / 10 | 28–8 |
| Win–loss | 0–0 | 0–2 | 0–1 | 1–1 | 3–3 | 3–4 | 6–4 | 6–3 | 3–3 | 13–4 | 14–3 | 9–4 | 14–4 | 15–2 | 3 / 42 | 87–38 |
Year-end championship
| ATP Finals | did not qualify | | | | | | | | | SF | RR | DNQ | F | | 0 / 3 | 7–5 |
National representation
| Summer Olympics | not held | | | A | not held | | | | 2R | not held | | 1R | not held | | 0 / 2 | 1–2 |
| Davis Cup | A | A | A | A | A | A | SF | QF | | RR | QF | RR | Q1 | | 0 / 6 | 10–5 |
| Win–loss | 0–0 | 0–0 | 0–0 | 0–0 | 0–0 | 0–0 | 2–1 | 1–2 | 1–1 | 1–0 | 3–1 | 2–2 | 1–0 | 0–0 | 0 / 8 | 11–7 |
ATP Tour Masters 1000
| Indian Wells Masters | A | A | A | A | A | A | 1R | NH | 1R | QF | F | 1R | 2R | QF | 0 / 7 | 8–7 |
| Miami Open | A | A | A | A | A | A | 1R | NH | F | F | QF | 1R | 1R | QF | 0 / 7 | 12–7 |
| Monte-Carlo Masters | A | A | A | A | A | A | 1R | NH | F | 1R | QF | 1R | 2R | QF | 0 / 7 | 6–7 |
| Madrid Open | A | A | A | A | A | A | 2R | NH | 1R | W | QF | 2R | 2R | 2R | 1 / 7 | 11–6 |
| Italian Open | A | A | A | A | A | A | QF | 1R | 1R | QF | SF | 1R | SF | SF | 0 / 8 | 12–8 |
| Canadian Open | A | A | A | A | A | A | 1R | NH | 2R | W | 2R | 2R | F | 1R | 1 / 7 | 10–6 |
| Cincinnati Masters | A | A | A | A | A | A | SF | F | 1R | 2R | 2R | QF | SF | 1R | 0 / 8 | 12–8 |
| Shanghai Masters | A | A | A | A | A | A | SF | NH | | | QF | 1R | 2R | | 0 / 4 | 7–4 |
| Paris Masters | A | A | A | A | A | QF | QF | 2R | 2R | W | QF | SF | 2R | | 1 / 8 | 15–7 |
| Win–loss | 0–0 | 0–0 | 0–0 | 0–0 | 0–0 | 2–1 | 10–9 | 5–3 | 10–8 | 21–5 | 14–9 | 7–9 | 15–9 | 0–0 | 3 / 56 | 84–53 |
Career statistics
| Tournaments | 1 | 12 | 4 | 9 | 8 | 18 | 29 | 17 | 23 | 25 | 16 | 27 | 26 | 2 | 217 | |
| Titles | 0 | 0 | 0 | 0 | 0 | 2 | 1 | 1 | 2 | 7 | 2 | 2 | 0 | 1 | 18 | |
| Finals | 1 | 0 | 0 | 0 | 0 | 4 | 4 | 3 | 5 | 10 | 6 | 5 | 6 | 1 | 45 | |
| Overall win–loss | 3–1 | 5–12 | 2–4 | 4–9 | 5–8 | 28–16 | 43–30 | 22–16 | 29–24 | 55–17 | 51–24 | 40–26 | 49–25 | 8–1 | 346–215 | |
| Win % | 75% | 29% | 33% | 31% | 38% | 64% | 59% | 58% | 55% | 76% | 68% | 61% | 66% | 89% | 62% | |
| Year-end ranking | 87 | 90 | 103 | 81 | 67 | 33 | 31 | 27 | 20 | 1 | 9 | 18 | 9 | | | |

=== Mixed doubles ===
| Tournament | 2014 | 2015 | 2016 | 2017 | 2018 | 2019 | 2020 | 2021 | 2022 | 2023 | 2024 | 2025 | 2026 | SR | W–L |
|---|---|---|---|---|---|---|---|---|---|---|---|---|---|---|---|
| Australian Open | A | A | A | A | A | SF | 2R | QF | 1R | SF | F | 1R | 1R | 0 / 8 | 13–8 |
| French Open | A | A | A | A | A | 2R | NH | QF | QF | 2R | F | SF | | 0 / 6 | 12–6 |
| Wimbledon | QF | 1R | 3R | 2R | 2R | 2R | NH | W | W | 1R | QF | QF | | 2 / 11 | 21–9 |
| US Open | A | A | A | A | A | 1R | NH | QF | 2R | A | 1R | A | | 0 / 4 | 3–4 |
| Win–loss | 3–1 | 0–1 | 2–1 | 1–1 | 1–1 | 4–4 | 1–1 | 10–3 | 8–3 | 4–3 | 10–4 | 5–3 | 0–1 | 2 / 29 | 49–27 |

== Grand Slam tournaments finals ==
=== Doubles: 6 (3 titles, 3 runner-ups) ===
| Result | Year | Tournament | Surface | Partner | Opponents | Score |
|---|---|---|---|---|---|---|
| Loss | 2022 | US Open | Hard | (Netherlands) Wesley Koolhof | (United States) Rajeev Ram (United Kingdom) Joe Salisbury | 6–7^{(4–7)}, 5–7 |
| Win | 2023 | Wimbledon | Grass | (Netherlands) Wesley Koolhof | (Spain) Marcel Granollers (Argentina) Horacio Zeballos | 6–4, 6–4 |
| Loss | 2025 | French Open | Clay | (United Kingdom) Joe Salisbury | (Spain) Marcel Granollers (Argentina) Horacio Zeballos | 0–6, 7–6^{(7–5)}, 5–7 |
| Loss | 2025 | US Open | Hard | (United Kingdom) Joe Salisbury | (Spain) Marcel Granollers (Argentina) Horacio Zeballos | 6–3, 6–7^{(5–7)}, 5–7 |
| Win | 2026 | Australian Open | Hard | (United States) Christian Harrison | (Australia) Jason Kubler (Australia) Marc Polmans | 7–6^{(7–4)}, 6–4 |
| Win | 2026 | US Open | Hard | (United States) Christian Harrison | (Germany) Kevin Krawietz (Germany) Tim Pütz | 6–4, 7–6^{(8–6)} |

=== Mixed doubles: 4 (2 titles, 2 runner-ups) ===
| Result | Year | Tournament | Surface | Partner | Opponents | Score |
|---|---|---|---|---|---|---|
| Win | 2021 | Wimbledon | Grass | (United States) Desirae Krawczyk | (United Kingdom) Harriet Dart (United Kingdom) Joe Salisbury | 6–2, 7–6^{(7–1)} |
| Win | 2022 | Wimbledon (2) | Grass | (United States) Desirae Krawczyk | (Australia) Samantha Stosur (Australia) Matthew Ebden | 6–4, 6–3 |
| Loss | 2024 | Australian Open | Hard | (United States) Desirae Krawczyk | (Chinese Taipei) Hsieh Su-wei (Poland) Jan Zieliński | 7–6^{(7–5)}, 4–6, [9–11] |
| Loss | 2024 | French Open | Clay | (United States) Desirae Krawczyk | (France) Édouard Roger-Vasselin (Germany) Laura Siegemund | 4–6, 5–7 |

== Other significant finals ==
=== Year-end championships ===
==== Doubles: 1 (runner-up) ====
| Result | Year | Tournament | Surface | Partner | Opponents | Score |
|---|---|---|---|---|---|---|
| Loss | 2025 | ATP Finals, Italy | Hard (i) | (United Kingdom) Joe Salisbury | (Finland) Harri Heliövaara (United Kingdom) Henry Patten | 5–7, 3–6 |

=== ATP 1000 tournaments ===
==== Doubles: 10 (3 titles, 7 runner-ups) ====
| Result | Year | Tournament | Surface | Partner | Opponents | Score |
|---|---|---|---|---|---|---|
| Loss | 2020 | Cincinnati Masters | Hard | (United Kingdom) Jamie Murray | (Spain) Pablo Carreño Busta (Australia) Alex de Minaur | 2–6, 5–7 |
| Loss | 2021 | Miami Open | Hard | (United Kingdom) Dan Evans | (Croatia) Nikola Mektić (Croatia) Mate Pavić | 4–6, 4–6 |
| Loss | 2021 | Monte-Carlo Masters | Clay | (United Kingdom) Dan Evans | (Croatia) Nikola Mektić (Croatia) Mate Pavić | 3–6, 6–4, [7–10] |
| Loss | 2022 | Miami Open | Hard | (Netherlands) Wesley Koolhof | (Poland) Hubert Hurkacz (United States) John Isner | 6–7^{(5–7)}, 4–6 |
| Win | 2022 | Madrid Open | Clay | (Netherlands) Wesley Koolhof | (Colombia) Juan Sebastián Cabal (Colombia) Robert Farah | 6–7^{(4–7)}, 6–4, [10–5] |
| Win | 2022 | Canadian Open | Hard | (Netherlands) Wesley Koolhof | (United Kingdom) Dan Evans (Australia) John Peers | 6–2, 4–6, [10–6] |
| Win | 2022 | Paris Masters | Hard (i) | (Netherlands) Wesley Koolhof | (Croatia) Ivan Dodig (United States) Austin Krajicek | 7–6^{(7–5)}, 6–4 |
| Loss | 2023 | Indian Wells Masters | Hard | (Netherlands) Wesley Koolhof | (India) Rohan Bopanna (Australia) Matthew Ebden | 3–6, 6–2, [8–10] |
| Loss | 2025 | Canadian Open | Hard | (United Kingdom) Joe Salisbury | (United Kingdom) Julian Cash (United Kingdom) Lloyd Glasspool | 3–6, 7–6^{(7–5)}, [11–13] |
| Loss | 2026 | Paris Masters | Hard (i) | (United States) Christian Harrison | (France) Quentin Halys (France) Pierre-Hugues Herbert | 6–7^{(3–7)}, 7–6^{(7–4)}, [8–10] |

== ATP Tour finals ==
=== Doubles: 47 (19 titles, 28 runner-ups) ===
| Legend Grand Slam (3–3) ATP Finals (0–1) ATP 1000 (3–7) ATP 500 (3–9) ATP 250 (10–8) | Finals by surface Hard (12–20) Clay (2–7) Grass (5–1) | Finals by setting Outdoor (15–22) Indoor (4–6) |

| Result | W–L | Date | Tournament | Tier | Surface | Partner | Opponents | Score |
|---|---|---|---|---|---|---|---|---|
| Loss | 0–1 | Oct 2013 | Kremlin Cup, Russia | 250 Series | Hard (i) | (United Kingdom) Ken Skupski | (Russia) Mikhail Elgin (Uzbekistan) Denis Istomin | 2–6, 6–1, [12–14] |
| Win | 1–1 | Feb 2018 | Open Sud de France, France | 250 Series | Hard (i) | (United Kingdom) Ken Skupski | (Japan) Ben McLachlan (France) Hugo Nys | 7–6^{(7–2)}, 6–4 |
| Loss | 1–2 | Jun 2018 | Eastbourne International, United Kingdom | 250 Series | Grass | (United Kingdom) Ken Skupski | (United Kingdom) Luke Bambridge (United Kingdom) Jonny O'Mara | 5–7, 4–6 |
| Loss | 1–3 | Sep 2018 | Moselle Open, France | 250 Series | Hard (i) | (United Kingdom) Ken Skupski | (France) Nicolas Mahut (France) Édouard Roger-Vasselin | 1–6, 5–7 |
| Win | 2–3 | Oct 2018 | Vienna Open, Austria | 500 Series | Hard (i) | (United Kingdom) Joe Salisbury | (United States) Mike Bryan (France) Édouard Roger-Vasselin | 7–6^{(7–5)}, 6–3 |
| Loss | 2–4 | Feb 2019 | Delray Beach Open, United States | 250 Series | Hard | (United Kingdom) Ken Skupski | (United States) Bob Bryan (United States) Mike Bryan | 6–7^{(5–7)}, 4–6 |
| Loss | 2–5 | Apr 2019 | US Clay Court Championships, United States | 250 Series | Clay | (United Kingdom) Ken Skupski | (Mexico) Santiago González (Pakistan) Aisam-ul-Haq Qureshi | 6–3, 4–6, [6–10] |
| Win | 3–5 | Apr 2019 | Hungarian Open, Hungary | 250 Series | Clay | (United Kingdom) Ken Skupski | (New Zealand) Marcus Daniell (Netherlands) Wesley Koolhof | 6–3, 6–4 |
| Loss | 3–6 | May 2019 | Lyon Open, France | 250 Series | Clay | (United Kingdom) Ken Skupski | (Croatia) Ivan Dodig (France) Édouard Roger-Vasselin | 4–6, 3–6 |
| Loss | 3–7 | Aug 2020 | Cincinnati Masters, United States | Masters 1000 | Hard | (United Kingdom) Jamie Murray | (Spain) Pablo Carreño Busta (Australia) Alex de Minaur | 2–6, 5–7 |
| Loss | 3–8 | Nov 2020 | Vienna Open, Austria | 500 Series | Hard (i) | (United Kingdom) Jamie Murray | (Poland) Łukasz Kubot (Brazil) Marcelo Melo | 6–7^{(5–7)}, 5–7 |
| Win | 4–8 | Nov 2020 | Sofia Open, Bulgaria | 250 Series | Hard (i) | (United Kingdom) Jamie Murray | (Austria) Jürgen Melzer (France) Édouard Roger-Vasselin | Walkover |
| Win | 5–8 | Mar 2021 | Mexican Open, Mexico | 500 Series | Hard | (United Kingdom) Ken Skupski | (Spain) Marcel Granollers (Argentina) Horacio Zeballos | 7–6^{(7–3)}, 6–4 |
| Loss | 5–9 | Apr 2021 | Miami Open; United States | Masters 1000 | Hard | (United Kingdom) Dan Evans | (Croatia) Nikola Mektić (Croatia) Mate Pavić | 4–6, 4–6 |
| Loss | 5–10 | Apr 2021 | Monte-Carlo Masters, Monaco | Masters 1000 | Clay | (United Kingdom) Dan Evans | (Croatia) Nikola Mektić (Croatia) Mate Pavić | 3–6, 6–4, [7–10] |
| Loss | 5–11 | Jul 2021 | Washington Open; United States | 500 Series | Hard | (New Zealand) Michael Venus | (South Africa) Raven Klaasen (Japan) Ben McLachlan | 6–7^{(4–7)}, 4–6 |
| Win | 6–11 | Oct 2021 | San Diego Open; United States | 250 Series | Hard | (United Kingdom) Joe Salisbury | (Australia) John Peers (Slovakia) Filip Polášek | 7–6^{(7–2)}, 3–6, [10–5] |
| Win | 7–11 | Jan 2022 | Melbourne Summer Set 1, Australia | 250 Series | Hard | (Netherlands) Wesley Koolhof | (Kazakhstan) Aleksandr Nedovyesov (Pakistan) Aisam-ul-Haq Qureshi | 6–4, 6–4 |
| Win | 8–11 | Jan 2022 | Adelaide International 2, Australia | 250 Series | Hard | (Netherlands) Wesley Koolhof | (Uruguay) Ariel Behar (Ecuador) Gonzalo Escobar | 7–6^{(7–5)}, 6–4 |
| Win | 9–11 | Feb 2022 | Qatar Open, Qatar | 250 Series | Hard | (Netherlands) Wesley Koolhof | (India) Rohan Bopanna (Canada) Denis Shapovalov | 7–6^{(7–4)}, 6–1 |
| Loss | 9–12 | Apr 2022 | Miami Open; United States | Masters 1000 | Hard | (Netherlands) Wesley Koolhof | (Poland) Hubert Hurkacz (United States) John Isner | 6–7^{(5–7)}, 4–6 |
| Loss | 9–13 | Apr 2022 | Barcelona Open, Spain | 500 Series | Clay | (Netherlands) Wesley Koolhof | (Germany) Kevin Krawietz (Germany) Andreas Mies | 7–6^{(7–3)}, 6–7^{(5–7)}, [6–10] |
| Win | 10–13 | May 2022 | Madrid Open, Spain | Masters 1000 | Clay | (Netherlands) Wesley Koolhof | (Colombia) Juan Sebastián Cabal (Colombia) Robert Farah | 6–7^{(4–7)}, 6–4, [10–5] |
| Win | 11–13 | Jun 2022 | Rosmalen Championships, Netherlands | 250 Series | Grass | (Netherlands) Wesley Koolhof | (Australia) Matthew Ebden (Australia) Max Purcell | 4–6, 7–5, [10–6] |
| Win | 12–13 | Aug 2022 | Canadian Open, Canada | Masters 1000 | Hard | (Netherlands) Wesley Koolhof | (United Kingdom) Dan Evans (Australia) John Peers | 6–2, 4–6, [10–6] |
| Loss | 12–14 | Sep 2022 | US Open, United States | Grand Slam | Hard | (Netherlands) Wesley Koolhof | (United States) Rajeev Ram (United Kingdom) Joe Salisbury | 6–7^{(4–7)}, 5–7 |
| Win | 13–14 | Nov 2022 | Paris Masters, France | Masters 1000 | Hard (i) | (Netherlands) Wesley Koolhof | (Croatia) Ivan Dodig (United States) Austin Krajicek | 7–6^{(7–5)}, 6–4 |
| Loss | 13–15 | Mar 2023 | Indian Wells Masters, United States | Masters 1000 | Hard | (Netherlands) Wesley Koolhof | (India) Rohan Bopanna (Australia) Matthew Ebden | 3–6, 6–2, [8–10] |
| Loss | 13–16 | Apr 2023 | Barcelona Open, Spain | 500 Series | Clay | (Netherlands) Wesley Koolhof | (Argentina) Máximo González (Argentina) Andrés Molteni | 3–6, 7–6^{(10–8)}, [4–10] |
| Win | 14–16 | Jun 2023 | Rosmalen Championships, Netherlands (2) | 250 Series | Grass | (Netherlands) Wesley Koolhof | (Ecuador) Gonzalo Escobar (Kazakhstan) Aleksandr Nedovyesov | 7–6^{(7–1)}, 6–2 |
| Win | 15–16 | Jul 2023 | Wimbledon Championships, United Kingdom | Grand Slam | Grass | (Netherlands) Wesley Koolhof | (Spain) Marcel Granollers (Argentina) Horacio Zeballos | 6–4, 6–4 |
| Loss | 15–17 | Aug 2023 | Winston-Salem Open, United States | 250 Series | Hard | (United Kingdom) Lloyd Glasspool | (United States) Nathaniel Lammons (United States) Jackson Withrow | 3–6, 4–6 |
| Loss | 15–18 | Oct 2023 | China Open, China | 500 Series | Hard | (Netherlands) Wesley Koolhof | (Croatia) Ivan Dodig (United States) Austin Krajicek | 7–6^{(14–12)}, 3–6, [5–10] |
| Loss | 15–19 | Feb 2024 | Delray Beach Open, United States | 250 Series | Hard | (Mexico) Santiago González | (United Kingdom) Julian Cash (United States) Robert Galloway | 7–5, 5–7, [2–10] |
| Loss | 15–20 | Mar 2024 | Mexican Open, Mexico | 500 Series | Hard | (Mexico) Santiago González | (Monaco) Hugo Nys (Poland) Jan Zieliński | 3–6, 2–6 |
| Win | 16–20 | Jun 2024 | Queen's Club Championships, United Kingdom | 500 Series | Grass | (New Zealand) Michael Venus | (United States) Taylor Fritz; Karen Khachanov | 4–6, 7–6^{(7–5)}, [10–8] |
| Win | 17–20 | Jun 2024 | Eastbourne International, United Kingdom | 250 Series | Grass | (New Zealand) Michael Venus | (Australia) Matthew Ebden (Australia) John Peers | 4–6, 7–6^{(7–2)}, [11–9] |
| Loss | 17–21 | Oct 2024 | Vienna Open, Austria | 500 Series | Hard (i) | (New Zealand) Michael Venus | (Austria) Alexander Erler (Austria) Lucas Miedler | 6–4, 3–6, [1–10] |
| Loss | 17–22 | Feb 2025 | Qatar Open, Qatar | 500 Series | Hard | (United Kingdom) Joe Salisbury | (United Kingdom) Julian Cash (United Kingdom) Lloyd Glasspool | 3–6, 2–6 |
| Loss | 17–23 | Apr 2025 | Barcelona Open, Spain | 500 Series | Clay | (United Kingdom) Joe Salisbury | (Netherlands) Sander Arends (United Kingdom) Luke Johnson | 3–6, 7–6^{(7–1)}, [6–10] |
| Loss | 17–24 | Jun 2025 | French Open, France | Grand Slam | Clay | (United Kingdom) Joe Salisbury | (Spain) Marcel Granollers (Argentina) Horacio Zeballos | 0–6, 7–6^{(7–5)}, 5–7 |
| Loss | 17–25 | Aug 2025 | Canadian Open, Canada | ATP 1000 | Hard | (United Kingdom) Joe Salisbury | (United Kingdom) Julian Cash (United Kingdom) Lloyd Glasspool | 3–6, 7–6^{(7–5)}, [11–13] |
| Loss | 17–26 | Sep 2025 | US Open, United States | Grand Slam | Hard | (United Kingdom) Joe Salisbury | (Spain) Marcel Granollers (Argentina) Horacio Zeballos | 6–3, 6–7^{(5–7)}, 5–7 |
| Loss | 17–27 | Nov 2025 | ATP Finals, Italy | Tour Finals | Hard (i) | (United Kingdom) Joe Salisbury | (Finland) Harri Heliövaara (United Kingdom) Henry Patten | 5–7, 3–6 |
| Win | 18–27 | Jan 2026 | Australian Open, Australia | Grand Slam | Hard | (United States) Christian Harrison | (Australia) Jason Kubler (Australia) Marc Polmans | 7–6^{(7–4)}, 6–4 |
| Win | 19–27 | Sep 2026 | US Open, United States | Grand Slam | Hard | (United States) Christian Harrison | (Germany) Kevin Krawietz (Germany) Tim Pütz | 6–4, 7–6^{(8–6)} |
| Loss | 19–28 | Nov 2026 | Paris Masters, France | ATP 1000 | Hard (i) | (United States) Christian Harrison | (France) Quentin Halys (France) Pierre-Hugues Herbert | 6–7^{(3–7)}, 7–6^{(7–4)}, [8–10] |

== ATP Challenger and ITF Tour finals ==
=== Doubles: 45 (30 titles, 15 runner-ups) ===
| Legend ATP Challenger Tour (23–13) ITF Futures (7–2) | Finals by surface Hard (21–8) Clay (5–0) Grass (3–5) Carpet (1–2) |

| Result | W–L | Date | Tournament | Tier | Surface | Partner | Opponents | Score |
|---|---|---|---|---|---|---|---|---|
| Loss | 0–1 | Aug 2010 | Great Britain F12, Roehampton | Futures | Hard | (United Kingdom) Oliver Golding | (United States) Ashwin Kumar (France) Laurent Rochette | 2–6, 7–6^{(10–8)}, [6–10] |
| Win | 1–1 | Jul 2011 | Ireland F1, Dublin | Futures | Carpet | (France) Albano Olivetti | (Republic of Ireland) James Cluskey (Republic of Ireland) James McGee | 7–6^{(7–4)}, 6–3 |
| Win | 2–1 | Jul 2011 | US F24, Costa Mesa | Futures | Hard | (United Kingdom) Chris Eaton | (United Kingdom) Daniel Cox (Australia) Adam Hubble | 6–3, 6–3 |
| Win | 3–1 | Jan 2013 | Great Britain F2, Portsmouth | Futures | Hard (i) | (United Kingdom) Ken Skupski | (Republic of Ireland) Sam Barry (Republic of Ireland) Colin O'Brien | 3–6, 6–3, [10–5] |
| Win | 4–1 | Feb 2013 | Great Britain F4, Birkenhead | Futures | Hard (i) | (United Kingdom) Lewis Burton | (Republic of Ireland) James Cluskey (United Kingdom) Sean Thornley | 7–6^{(7–5)}, 2–6, [10–7] |
| Loss | 4–2 | Mar 2013 | Great Britain F5, Cardiff | Futures | Hard (i) | (United Kingdom) Edward Corrie | (United Kingdom) David Rice (United Kingdom) Sean Thornley | 1–6, 5–7 |
| Win | 5–2 | Apr 2013 | Great Britain F9, Bournemouth | Futures | Clay | (United Kingdom) Richard Gabb | (United Kingdom) Jack Carpenter (United Kingdom) Ashley Hewitt | 6–3, 2–6, [10–3] |
| Win | 6–2 | May 2013 | Italy F6, Pozzuoli | Futures | Clay | (United Kingdom) Ken Skupski | (United Kingdom) Oliver Golding (Ukraine) Denys Mylokostov | 6–3, 6–3 |
| Loss | 0–1 | Jun 2013 | Nottingham, United Kingdom | Challenger | Grass | (United Kingdom) Ken Skupski | (United Kingdom) Jamie Murray (Australia) John Peers | 2–6, 7–6^{(7–3)}, [6–10] |
| Win | 7–2 | Jul 2013 | Great Britain F12, Manchester | Futures | Grass | (France) Albano Olivetti | (Australia) Zach Itzstein (United Kingdom) Brydan Klein | 7–6^{(7–4)}, 6–3 |
| Win | 1–1 | Jul 2013 | Recanati, Italy | Challenger | Hard | (United Kingdom) Ken Skupski | (Italy) Gianluigi Quinzi (Italy) Adelchi Virgili | 6–4, 6–3 |
| Win | 2–1 | Aug 2013 | Segovia, Spain | Challenger | Hard | (United Kingdom) Ken Skupski | (Russia) Mikhail Elgin (Belarus) Uladzimir Ignatik | 6–3, 6–7^{(4–7)}, [10–6] |
| Win | 3–1 | Sep 2013 | Pétange, Luxembourg | Challenger | Hard (i) | (United Kingdom) Ken Skupski | (Germany) Benjamin Becker (Germany) Tobias Kamke | 6–3, 6–7^{(5–7)}, [10–7] |
| Win | 4–1 | Sep 2013 | Szczecin, Poland | Challenger | Clay | (United Kingdom) Ken Skupski | (Italy) Andrea Arnaboldi (Italy) Alessandro Giannessi | 6–4, 1–6, [10–7] |
| Loss | 4–2 | Jan 2014 | Talheim, Germany | Challenger | Hard (i) | (United Kingdom) Ken Skupski | (Poland) Tomasz Bednarek (Finland) Henri Kontinen | 6–3, 6–7^{(3–7)}, [10–12] |
| Win | 5–2 | Sep 2014 | İzmir, Turkey | Challenger | Hard | (United Kingdom) Ken Skupski | (Tunisia) Malek Jaziri (Russia) Alexander Kudryavtsev | 6–1, 6–4 |
| Win | 6–2 | Nov 2014 | Bratislava, Slovakia | Challenger | Hard (i) | (United Kingdom) Ken Skupski | (Slovakia) Norbert Gombos (Czech Republic) Adam Pavlásek | 6–3, 7–6^{(7–3)} |
| Win | 7–2 | Jun 2015 | Surbiton, United Kingdom | Challenger | Grass | (United Kingdom) Ken Skupski | (New Zealand) Marcus Daniell (Brazil) Marcelo Demoliner | 6–3, 6–4 |
| Loss | 7–3 | Jun 2015 | Ilkley, United Kingdom | Challenger | Grass | (United Kingdom) Ken Skupski | (New Zealand) Marcus Daniell (Brazil) Marcelo Demoliner | 6–7^{(3–7)}, 4–6 |
| Win | 8–3 | Sep 2015 | Saint-Rémy, France | Challenger | Hard | (United Kingdom) Ken Skupski | (Slovakia) Andrej Martin (Slovakia) Igor Zelenay | 6–4, 6–1 |
| Loss | 8–4 | Oct 2015 | Orléans, France | Challenger | Hard (i) | (United Kingdom) Ken Skupski | (France) Tristan Lamasine (France) Fabrice Martin | 4–6, 6–7^{(2–7)} |
| Loss | 8–5 | Oct 2015 | Brest, France | Challenger | Hard (i) | (United Kingdom) Ken Skupski | (Netherlands) Wesley Koolhof (Netherlands) Matwé Middelkoop | 6–3, 4–6, [6–10] |
| Loss | 8–6 | Nov 2015 | Eckental, Germany | Challenger | Carpet (i) | (United Kingdom) Ken Skupski | (Belgium) Ruben Bemelmans (Germany) Philipp Petzschner | 5–7, 2–6 |
| Loss | 8–7 | Nov 2015 | Bratislava, Slovakia | Challenger | Hard (i) | (United Kingdom) Ken Skupski | (Serbia) Ilija Bozoljac (Slovakia) Igor Zelenay | 6–7^{(3–7)}, 6–4, [5–10] |
| Win | 9–7 | Feb 2016 | Bergamo, Italy | Challenger | Hard (i) | (United Kingdom) Ken Skupski | (Croatia) Nikola Mektić (Croatia) Antonio Šančić | 6–3, 7–5 |
| Win | 10–7 | Feb 2016 | Cherbourg, France | Challenger | Hard (i) | (United Kingdom) Ken Skupski | (Japan) Yoshihito Nishioka (Bosnia and Herzegovina) Aldin Šetkić | 4–6, 6–3, [10–6] |
| Loss | 10–8 | Jun 2016 | Manchester, United Kingdom | Challenger | Grass | (United Kingdom) Ken Skupski | (India) Purav Raja (India) Divij Sharan | 3–6, 6–3, [9–11] |
| Loss | 10–9 | Jun 2016 | Surbiton, United Kingdom | Challenger | Grass | (United Kingdom) Ken Skupski | (India) Purav Raja (India) Divij Sharan | 4–6, 6–7^{(3–7)} |
| Win | 11–9 | Sep 2016 | Saint-Rémy, France (2) | Challenger | Hard | (United Kingdom) Ken Skupski | (Republic of Ireland) David O'Hare (United Kingdom) Joe Salisbury | 6–7^{(5–7)}, 6–4, [10–5] |
| Win | 12–9 | Nov 2016 | Bratislava, Slovakia (2) | Challenger | Hard (i) | (United Kingdom) Ken Skupski | (India) Purav Raja (India) Divij Sharan | 4–6, 6–3, [10–5] |
| Loss | 12–10 | Feb 2017 | Quimper, France | Challenger | Hard (i) | (United Kingdom) Ken Skupski | (Russia) Mikhail Elgin (Slovakia) Igor Zelenay | 6–2, 5–7, [5–10] |
| Win | 13–10 | May 2017 | Savannah, US | Challenger | Clay (green) | (Canada) Peter Polansky | (United Kingdom) Luke Bambridge (United States) Mitchell Krueger | 4–6, 6–3, [10–1] |
| Win | 14–10 | May 2017 | Venice, Italy | Challenger | Clay | (United Kingdom) Ken Skupski | (Austria) Julian Knowle (Slovakia) Igor Zelenay | 5–7, 6–4, [10–5] |
| Win | 15–10 | Jun 2017 | Nottingham, United Kingdom | Challenger | Grass | (United Kingdom) Ken Skupski | (Australia) Matt Reid (Australia) John-Patrick Smith | 7–6^{(7–1)}, 2–6, [10–7] |
| Win | 16–10 | Aug 2017 | Aptos, US | Challenger | Hard | (Israel) Jonathan Erlich | (Australia) Alex Bolt (Australia) Jordan Thompson | 6–3, 2–6, [10–8] |
| Win | 17–10 | Aug 2017 | Vancouver, Canada | Challenger | Hard | (United States) James Cerretani | (Philippines) Treat Huey (Sweden) Robert Lindstedt | 7–6^{(8–6)}, 6–2 |
| Loss | 17–11 | Nov 2017 | Eckental, Germany | Challenger | Carpet (i) | (United Kingdom) Ken Skupski | (Netherlands) Sander Arends (Czech Republic) Roman Jebavý | 2–6, 4–6 |
| Win | 18–11 | Nov 2017 | Bratislava, Slovakia (3) | Challenger | Hard (i) | (United Kingdom) Ken Skupski | (Netherlands) Sander Arends (Croatia) Antonio Šančić | 5–7, 6–3, [10–8] |
| Win | 19–11 | Feb 2018 | Quimper, France | Challenger | Hard (i) | (United Kingdom) Ken Skupski | (Belgium) Sander Gillé (Belgium) Joran Vliegen | 6–3, 3–6, [10–7] |
| Win | 20–11 | Apr 2018 | Le Gosier, Guadeloupe (France) | Challenger | Hard | (Australia) John-Patrick Smith | (Belgium) Ruben Bemelmans (France) Jonathan Eysseric | 7–6^{(7–3)}, 6–4 |
| Loss | 20–12 | Jun 2018 | Surbiton, United Kingdom | Challenger | Grass | (United Kingdom) Ken Skupski | (United Kingdom) Luke Bambridge (United Kingdom) Jonny O'Mara | 6–7^{(11–13)}, 6–4, [7–10] |
| Win | 21–12 | Aug 2018 | Vancouver, Canada (2) | Challenger | Hard | (United Kingdom) Luke Bambridge | (Australia) Marc Polmans (Australia) Max Purcell | 4–6, 6–3, [10–6] |
| Win | 22–12 | Sep 2018 | Chicago, US | Challenger | Hard | (United Kingdom) Luke Bambridge | (India) Leander Paes (Mexico) Miguel Ángel Reyes-Varela | 6–3, 6–4 |
| Win | 23–12 | Mar 2019 | Phoenix, US | Challenger | Hard | (United Kingdom) Jamie Murray | (United States) Austin Krajicek (New Zealand) Artem Sitak | 6–7^{(2–7)}, 7–5, [10–6] |
| Loss | 23–13 | May 2024 | Turin, Italy | Challenger | Hard (i) | (Germany) Andreas Mies | (Finland) Harri Heliövaara (United Kingdom) Henry Patten | 3–6, 3–6 |
