= 2022 Mutua Madrid Open – Men's doubles =

Men's doubles
- 2022 Mutua Madrid Open

Final
- Champions: (Netherlands) Wesley Koolhof; (United Kingdom) Neal Skupski
- Runners-up: (Colombia) Juan Sebastián Cabal; (Colombia) Robert Farah
- Score: 6–7^{(4–7)}, 6–4, [10–5]

Events
| Singles | men | women |
| Doubles | men | women |
- Mutua Madrid Open

Wesley Koolhof and Neal Skupski defeated Juan Sebastián Cabal and Robert Farah in the final, 6–7^{(4–7)}, 6–4, [10–5] to win the men's doubles tennis title at the 2022 Madrid Open. It was their first ATP Masters 1000 title.

Marcel Granollers and Horacio Zeballos were the defending champions, but lost in the quarterfinals to Cabal and Farah.

This tournament marked the final professional appearance of former doubles world No. 3 and Olympic gold medalist Marc López.

== Seeds ==
1. (United States) Rajeev Ram / (United Kingdom) Joe Salisbury (second round)
2. (Spain) Marcel Granollers / (Argentina) Horacio Zeballos (quarterfinals)
3. (Croatia) Nikola Mektić / (Croatia) Mate Pavić (second round)
4. (France) Pierre-Hugues Herbert / (France) Nicolas Mahut (second round)
5. (Colombia) Juan Sebastián Cabal / (Colombia) Robert Farah (final)
6. (Australia) John Peers / (Slovakia) Filip Polášek (first round)
7. (Netherlands) Wesley Koolhof / (United Kingdom) Neal Skupski (champions)
8. (United Kingdom) Jamie Murray / (New Zealand) Michael Venus (semifinals)

== Draw ==
Key

- Q = Qualifier
- WC = Wild card
- LL = Lucky loser
- Alt = Alternate
- ITF = ITF entry
- PR = Protected ranking
- SR = Special ranking
- SE = Special exempt
- JE = Junior exempt
- JR = Junior Accelerator Programme entrant
- CO = College Accelerator Programme entrant
- NG = Next Gen Accelerator Program entrant
- w/o = Walkover
- r = Retired
- d = Defaulted

=== Finals ===
Semifinals
(Poland) Hubert Hurkacz (United States) John Isner | 6^{7} | 5
7 | (Netherlands) Wesley Koolhof (United Kingdom) Neal Skupski | 7^{9} | 7
8 | (United Kingdom) Jamie Murray (New Zealand) Michael Venus | 6^{3} | 3
5 | (Colombia) Juan Sebastián Cabal (Colombia) Robert Farah | 7^{7} | 6

Final
7 | (Netherlands) Wesley Koolhof (United Kingdom) Neal Skupski | 6^{4} | 6 | [10]
5 | (Colombia) Juan Sebastián Cabal (Colombia) Robert Farah | 7^{7} | 4 | [5]

=== Top half ===
First round

Second round

Quarterfinals

Semifinals

1
- (United States) R Ram
- (United Kingdom) J Salisbury
4
4

(El Salvador) M Arévalo
(Netherlands) J-J Rojer

PR
(Germany) K Krawietz
(Germany) A Mies
6
6

PR
(Germany) K Krawietz
(Germany) A Mies
w/o

PR
- (Germany) K Krawietz
- (Germany) A Mies
6
6^{5}
[5]

(Poland) H Hurkacz
(United States) J Isner
6
3
[10]

(Poland) H Hurkacz
(United States) J Isner
4
7^{7}
[10]

(Uruguay) A Behar
(Ecuador) G Escobar
3
6
[7]

(Poland) H Hurkacz
(United States) J Isner
6
6

K Khachanov
A Rublev
7
6

- K Khachanov
- A Rublev
3
4

6
- (Australia) J Peers
- (Slovakia) F Polášek
5
4

- (Poland) H Hurkacz
- (United States) J Isner
6^{7}
5

7
(Netherlands) W Koolhof
(United Kingdom) N Skupski
7^{9}
7

4
- (France) P-H Herbert
- (France) N Mahut
6
6^{3}
[6]

(Bosnia and Herzegovina) T Brkić
(Serbia) N Ćaćić
7^{8}
7^{10}

(Bosnia and Herzegovina) T Brkić
(Serbia) N Ćaćić
4
7^{7}
[10]

Alt
- (Argentina) F Delbonis
- (Argentina) A Molteni
6^{6}
6^{8}

- (Bosnia and Herzegovina) T Brkić
- (Serbia) N Ćaćić
3
7^{8}
[2]

PR
- (Poland) Ł Kubot
- (France) É Roger-Vasselin
6
6^{2}
[4]

7
(Netherlands) W Koolhof
(United Kingdom) N Skupski
6
6^{6}
[10]

WC
(Spain) C Alcaraz
(Spain) M López
4
7^{7}
[10]

WC
- (Spain) C Alcaraz
- (Spain) M López
3
6
[7]

Alt
- (Georgia (country)) N Basilashvili
- (Kazakhstan) A Bublik
5
2

7
(Netherlands) W Koolhof
(United Kingdom) N Skupski
6
3
[10]

7
(Netherlands) W Koolhof
(United Kingdom) N Skupski
7
6

=== Bottom half ===
First round

Second round

Quarterfinals

Semifinals

8
(United Kingdom) J Murray
(New Zealand) M Venus
6
3
[10]

WC
- (Greece) Pe Tsitsipas
- (Greece) S Tsitsipas
2
6
[7]

8
(United Kingdom) J Murray
(New Zealand) M Venus
6
6

(United Kingdom) C Norrie
(United States) T Paul
3
6
[10]

- (United Kingdom) C Norrie
- (United States) T Paul
4
3

- (Brazil) M Melo
- (Germany) A Zverev
6
3
[7]

8
(United Kingdom) J Murray
(New Zealand) M Venus
7^{7}
7^{9}

- (Kazakhstan) A Golubev
- (Mexico) S González
6
1
[8]

- (Italy) S Bolelli
- (Croatia) I Dodig
6^{5}
6^{7}

(Italy) S Bolelli
(Croatia) I Dodig
3
6
[10]

(Italy) S Bolelli
(Croatia) I Dodig
7
3
[10]

3
- (Croatia) N Mektić
- (Croatia) M Pavić
5
6
[6]

8
- (United Kingdom) J Murray
- (New Zealand) M Venus
6^{3}
3

5
(Colombia) JS Cabal
(Colombia) R Farah
6^{8}
7^{7}
[11]

5
(Colombia) JS Cabal
(Colombia) R Farah
7^{7}
6

- (South Africa) R Klaasen
- (Japan) B McLachlan
7^{10}
6^{3}
[9]

5
(Colombia) JS Cabal
(Colombia) R Farah
w/o

- (Argentina) M González
- (Argentina) D Schwartzman
3
6^{8}

- (Canada) F Auger-Aliassime
- (Bulgaria) G Dimitrov

(Canada) F Auger-Aliassime
(Bulgaria) G Dimitrov
6
7^{10}

5
(Colombia) JS Cabal
(Colombia) R Farah
7^{7}
6

WC
(Spain) P Carreño Busta
(Spain) P Martínez
6^{6}
6
[10]

2
- (Spain) M Granollers
- (Argentina) H Zeballos
6^{5}
4

- (India) R Bopanna
- (Canada) D Shapovalov
7^{8}
3
[1]

WC
- (Spain) P Carreño Busta
- (Spain) P Martínez
6^{8}
6
[5]

2
(Spain) M Granollers
(Argentina) H Zeballos
7^{10}
2
[10]

== Seeded teams ==
The following are the seeded teams, based on ATP rankings as of April 25, 2022.

| Country | Player | Country | Player | Rank | Seed |
|---|---|---|---|---|---|
| USA | Rajeev Ram | GBR | Joe Salisbury | 3 | 1 |
| ESP | Marcel Granollers | ARG | Horacio Zeballos | 9 | 2 |
| CRO | Nikola Mektić | CRO | Mate Pavić | 9 | 3 |
| FRA | Pierre-Hugues Herbert | FRA | Nicolas Mahut | 15 | 4 |
| COL | Juan Sebastián Cabal | COL | Robert Farah | 26 | 5 |
| AUS | John Peers | SVK | Filip Polášek | 26 | 6 |
| NED | Wesley Koolhof | GBR | Neal Skupski | 32 | 7 |
| GBR | Jamie Murray | NZL | Michael Venus | 33 | 8 |

== Other entry information ==
=== Wildcards ===
- (Spain) Carlos Alcaraz / (Spain) Marc López
- (Spain) Pablo Carreño Busta / (Spain) Pedro Martínez
- (Greece) Petros Tsitsipas / (Greece) Stefanos Tsitsipas

=== Alternates ===
- (Georgia (country)) Nikoloz Basilashvili / (Kazakhstan) Alexander Bublik
- (Argentina) Federico Delbonis / (Argentina) Andrés Molteni

=== Withdrawals ===
Before the tournament

- (El Salvador) Marcelo Arévalo / (Netherlands) Jean-Julien Rojer
- (United States) Taylor Fritz / (United States) Reilly Opelka → replaced by (Argentina) Federico Delbonis / (Argentina) Andrés Molteni
- (Belgium) Sander Gillé / (Belgium) Joran Vliegen → replaced by (Georgia (country)) Nikoloz Basilashvili / (Kazakhstan) Alexander Bublik
- (Germany) Tim Pütz / (New Zealand) Michael Venus → replaced by (United Kingdom) Jamie Murray / (New Zealand) Michael Venus
