= 2022 National Bank Open – Women's doubles =

Women's doubles
- 2022 National Bank Open

Final
- Champions: (United States) Coco Gauff (United States) Jessica Pegula
- Runners-up: (United States) Nicole Melichar-Martinez (Australia) Ellen Perez
- Score: 6–4, 6–7^{(5–7)}, [10–5]

Details
- Draw: 28
- Seeds: 8

Events
| Singles | men | women |
| Doubles | men | women |
- National Bank Open

Coco Gauff and Jessica Pegula defeated Nicole Melichar-Martinez and Ellen Perez in the final, 6–4, 6–7^{(5–7)}, [10–5] to win the women's doubles tennis title at the 2022 Canadian Open. With the win, Gauff gained the WTA No. 1 doubles ranking for the first time and became the second-youngest player in history to attain the No. 1 ranking, after Martina Hingis in 1997. Elise Mertens and Zhang Shuai were also in contention for the top ranking.

Gabriela Dabrowski and Luisa Stefani were the reigning champions, but Stefani did not return due to injury. Dabrowski partnered with Giuliana Olmos, but lost in the semifinals to Melichar-Martinez and Perez.

== Seeds ==
The top four seeds received a bye into the second round.

1. Veronika Kudermetova / (Belgium) Elise Mertens (second round)
2. (Canada) Gabriela Dabrowski / (Mexico) Giuliana Olmos (semifinals)
3. (United States) Coco Gauff / (United States) Jessica Pegula (champions)
4. (Australia) Storm Sanders / (China) Zhang Shuai (quarterfinals)
5. (United States) Desirae Krawczyk / (Netherlands) Demi Schuurs (quarterfinals)
6. (Ukraine) Lyudmyla Kichenok / (Latvia) Jeļena Ostapenko (second round)
7. (Brazil) Beatriz Haddad Maia / (Czech Republic) Barbora Krejčíková (second round)
8. (Chile) Alexa Guarachi / (Slovenia) Andreja Klepač (quarterfinals)

== Draw ==
Key

- Q = Qualifier
- WC = Wild card
- LL = Lucky loser
- Alt = Alternate
- ITF = ITF entry
- PR = Protected ranking
- SR = Special ranking
- SE = Special exempt
- JE = Junior exempt
- JR = Junior Accelerator Programme entrant
- CO = College Accelerator Programme entrant
- NG = Next Gen Accelerator Program entrant
- w/o = Walkover
- r = Retired
- d = Defaulted

=== Finals ===
Semifinals
(United States) Madison Keys (India) Sania Mirza | 5 | 5
3 | (United States) Coco Gauff (United States) Jessica Pegula | 7 | 7
(United States) Nicole Melichar-Martinez (Australia) Ellen Perez | 7^{7} | 6
2 | (Canada) Gabriela Dabrowski (Mexico) Giuliana Olmos | 6^{5} | 3

Final
3 | (United States) Coco Gauff (United States) Jessica Pegula | 6 | 6^{5} | [10]
(United States) Nicole Melichar-Martinez (Australia) Ellen Perez | 4 | 7^{7} | [5]

=== Top half ===
First round
(United States) M Keys (India) S Mirza | 6 | 3 | [10]
(France) A Cornet (Switzerland) J Teichmann | 4 | 6 | [6]
(Hungary) A Bondár (Belgium) K Zimmermann | 6^{10} | 5
(United States) S Kenin (Kazakhstan) Y Putintseva | 7^{12} | 7
(Norway) U Eikeri (United States) C Harrison | 6^{5} | 6 | [10]
6 | (Ukraine) L Kichenok (Latvia) J Ostapenko | 7^{7} | 4 | [12]
(Czech Republic) M Bouzková (Germany) L Siegemund | 6 | 6
(Ukraine) N Kichenok (Slovakia) T Mihalíková | 3 | 4
(Japan) S Aoyama (Chinese Taipei) H-c Chan | 2 | 6 | [7]
(China) Y Xu (China) Z Yang | 6 | 2 | [10]
L Samsonova (Italy) M Trevisan | 1 | 2
5 | (United States) D Krawczyk (Netherlands) D Schuurs | 6 | 6

Second round
1 | V Kudermetova (Belgium) E Mertens | 6 | 4 | [8]
(United States) M Keys (India) S Mirza | 3 | 6 | [10]
(United States) S Kenin (Kazakhstan) Y Putintseva | 1 | 6 | [10]
6 | (Ukraine) L Kichenok (Latvia) J Ostapenko | 6 | 1 | [4]
3 | (United States) C Gauff (United States) J Pegula | w/o
(Czech Republic) M Bouzková (Germany) L Siegemund
(China) Y Xu (China) Z Yang | 4 | 4
5 | (United States) D Krawczyk (Netherlands) D Schuurs | 6 | 6

Quarterfinals
(United States) M Keys (India) S Mirza | 7 | 3 | [10]
(United States) S Kenin (Kazakhstan) Y Putintseva | 5 | 6 | [6]
3 | (United States) C Gauff (United States) J Pegula | 6 | 2 | [10]
5 | (United States) D Krawczyk (Netherlands) D Schuurs | 3 | 6 | [3]

Semifinals
(United States) M Keys (India) S Mirza | 5 | 5
3 | (United States) C Gauff (United States) J Pegula | 7 | 7

=== Bottom half ===
First round
7 | (Brazil) B Haddad Maia (Czech Republic) B Krejčíková | 6 | 6
(United States) K Christian (Georgia (country)) O Kalashnikova | 1 | 2
(Poland) A Rosolska (New Zealand) E Routliffe | 6^{1} | 1
(United States) N Melichar-Martinez (Australia) E Perez | 7^{7} | 6
(Japan) E Hozumi (Japan) M Ninomiya | 2 | 6^{6}
(Germany) V Heisen (Romania) M Niculescu | 6 | 7^{8}
8 | (Chile) A Guarachi (Slovenia) A Klepač | 6 | 6
WC | (Canada) R Marino (Canada) C Zhao | 3 | 3
(Belgium) K Flipkens (Spain) S Sorribes Tormo | 4 | 1
WC | (Canada) B Fernandez (Canada) L Fernandez | 6 | 6
(United States) A Muhammad (Japan) E Shibahara | 6 | 5 | [10]
WC | (Canada) K Cross (Canada) V Mboko | 3 | 7 | [8]

Second round
7 | (Brazil) B Haddad Maia (Czech Republic) B Krejčíková | 6 | 2 | [7]
(United States) N Melichar-Martinez (Australia) E Perez | 1 | 6 | [10]
(Germany) V Heisen (Romania) M Niculescu | 3 | 3
4 | (Australia) S Sanders (China) S Zhang | 6 | 6
8 | (Chile) A Guarachi (Slovenia) A Klepač | 6 | 6
WC | (Canada) B Fernandez (Canada) L Fernandez | 1 | 2
(United States) A Muhammad (Japan) E Shibahara | 5 | 3
2 | (Canada) G Dabrowski (Mexico) G Olmos | 7 | 6

Quarterfinals
(United States) N Melichar-Martinez (Australia) E Perez | 6 | 6
4 | (Australia) S Sanders (China) S Zhang | 4 | 4
8 | (Chile) A Guarachi (Slovenia) A Klepač | 6 | 2 | [0]
2 | (Canada) G Dabrowski (Mexico) G Olmos | 2 | 6 | [10]

Semifinals
(United States) N Melichar-Martinez (Australia) E Perez | 7^{7} | 6
2 | (Canada) G Dabrowski (Mexico) G Olmos | 6^{5} | 3

== Seeded teams ==
The following are the seeded teams, based on WTA rankings as of August 1, 2022.

| Country | Player | Country | Player | Rank^{1} | Seed |
|---|---|---|---|---|---|
| | Veronika Kudermetova | BEL | Elise Mertens | 6 | 1 |
| CAN | Gabriela Dabrowski | MEX | Giuliana Olmos | 17 | 2 |
| USA | Coco Gauff | USA | Jessica Pegula | 18 | 3 |
| AUS | Storm Sanders | CHN | Zhang Shuai | 22 | 4 |
| USA | Desirae Krawczyk | NED | Demi Schuurs | 28 | 5 |
| UKR | Lyudmyla Kichenok | LAT | Jeļena Ostapenko | 30 | 6 |
| BRA | Beatriz Haddad Maia | CZE | Barbora Krejčiková | 32 | 7 |
| CHI | Alexa Guarachi | SLO | Andreja Klepač | 43 | 8 |

== Other entry information ==
=== Wild cards ===
- (Canada) Kayla Cross / (Canada) Victoria Mboko
- (Canada) Bianca Fernandez / (Canada) Leylah Fernandez
- (Canada) Rebecca Marino / (Canada) Carol Zhao

=== Withdrawals ===
- (Czech Republic) Marie Bouzková / (Germany) Laura Siegemund (Bouzková – back injury)
- (Czech Republic) Lucie Hradecká / (India) Sania Mirza → replaced by (United States) Madison Keys / (India) Sania Mirza
- (Romania) Monica Niculescu / (Romania) Elena-Gabriela Ruse → replaced by (Germany) Vivian Heisen / (Romania) Monica Niculescu
