= 2022 National Bank Open =

Canadian tennis tournament

- Date: August 8–14, 2022
- Edition: 132nd (men) / 120th (women)
- Category: ATP Tour Masters 1000 (men); WTA 1000 (women)
- Draw: 56S / 28D
- Prize money: $6,573,785 (men) $2,697,250 (women)
- Surface: Hard / outdoor
- Location: Montreal, Quebec, Canada (men); Toronto, Ontario, Canada (women)

Champions

Men's singles
- (Spain) Pablo Carreño Busta

Women's singles
- (Romania) Simona Halep

Men's doubles
- (Netherlands) Wesley Koolhof / (United Kingdom) Neal Skupski

Women's doubles
- (United States) Coco Gauff / (United States) Jessica Pegula
- Canadian Open (tennis)

The 2022 Canadian Open championships (branded as the 2022 National Bank Open presented by Rogers for sponsorship reasons) were outdoor hard court tennis tournaments played from August 8 to August 14, 2022, as part of the 2022 US Open Series. The men's tournament took place at the IGA Stadium in Montreal and the women's event took place at the Sobeys Stadium in Toronto. It was the 132nd edition of the men's tournament—a Masters 1000 event on the 2022 ATP Tour, and the 120th edition of the women's tournament—a WTA 1000 event on the 2022 WTA Tour.

== Points and prize money ==
=== Point distribution ===
Event	W	F	SF	QF	Round of 16	Round of 32	Round of 64	Q	Q2	Q1
Men's singles	1000	600	360	180	90	45	10	25	16	0
Men's doubles	1000	600	360	180	90	0	—N/a	—N/a	—N/a	—N/a
Women's singles	900	585	350	190	105	60	1	30	20	1
Women's doubles	900	585	350	190	105	5	—N/a	—N/a	—N/a	—N/a

=== Prize money ===
Event	W	F	SF	QF	Round of 16	Round of 32	Round of 64	Q2	Q1
Men's singles	$915,295	$499,830	$273,320	$149,085	$79,745	$42,760	$23,690	$12,135	$6,355
Women's singles	$439,700	$259,100	$133,400	$61,300	$30,660	$17,445	$12,515	$7,345	$3,820
Men's doubles*	$280,830	$152,550	$83,790	$46,230	$25,420	$13,870	—N/a	—N/a	—N/a
Women's doubles*	$128,400	$72,170	$39,680	$20,010	$11,330	$7,600	—N/a	—N/a	—N/a

_{*per team}

== Champions ==
=== Men's singles ===
- (Spain) Pablo Carreño Busta def. (Poland) Hubert Hurkacz, 3–6, 6–3, 6–3

=== Women's singles ===
- (Romania) Simona Halep def. (Brazil) Beatriz Haddad Maia 6–3, 2–6, 6–3

This was Halep's second title of the year and 24th of her career.

=== Men's doubles ===
- (Netherlands) Wesley Koolhof / (United Kingdom) Neal Skupski def. (United Kingdom) Dan Evans / (Australia) John Peers, 6–2, 4–6, [10–6]

=== Women's doubles ===
- (United States) Coco Gauff / (United States) Jessica Pegula def. (United States) Nicole Melichar-Martinez / (Australia) Ellen Perez, 6–4, 6–7^{(5–7)}, [10–5].

By winning the title, Gauff gained the No. 1 WTA doubles ranking for the first time.
