= 2022 Rolex Paris Masters =

- Date: 31 October – 6 November
- Edition: 50th
- Category: ATP Tour Masters 1000
- Draw: 56S / 24D
- Prize money: €5,415,410
- Surface: Hard (indoor)
- Location: Paris, France
- Venue: Accor Arena

Champions

Singles
- (Denmark) Holger Rune

Doubles
- (Netherlands) Wesley Koolhof / (United Kingdom) Neal Skupski
- Paris Masters

The 2022 Rolex Paris Masters was a professional men's tennis tournament played on indoor hard courts. It was the 50th edition of the tournament, and a Masters 1000 event on the 2022 ATP Tour. It took place at the Accor Arena in Paris from 31 October to 6 November 2022.

== Champions ==
=== Singles ===
- (Denmark) Holger Rune def. (Serbia) Novak Djokovic, 3–6, 6–3, 7–5

=== Doubles ===
- (Netherlands) Wesley Koolhof / (United Kingdom) Neal Skupski def. (Croatia) Ivan Dodig / (United States) Austin Krajicek, 7–6^{(7–5)}, 6–4

== Points and prize money ==
=== Point distribution ===
Event	W	F	SF	QF	Round of 16	Round of 32	Round of 64	Q	Q2	Q1
Men's Singles	1,000	600	360	180	90	45	10	25	16	0
Men's Doubles	1,000	600	360	180	90	0	—N/a	—N/a	—N/a	—N/a

=== Prize money ===
Event	W	F	SF	QF	Round of 16	Round of 32	Round of 64	Q2	Q1
Men's Singles	€836,355	€456,720	€249,740	€136,225	€72,865	€39,070	€21,650	€11,090	€5,810
Men's Doubles*	€282,960	€147,840	€78,140	€43,300	€23,760	€13,200	—N/a	—N/a	—N/a

_{*per team}

== Seeded players ==
The following are the seeded players. Seedings are based on ATP rankings as of October 24, 2022. Rank and points before are as of October 31, 2022. The entry list was based on ATP rankings as of October 3.

Because the 2021 tournament was non-mandatory, players are defending points from that tournament only if they counted towards their 19 best results as of October 31, 2022. Players who are not defending points from the 2021 tournament will instead have their 19th best result replaced by their points from the 2022 tournament.

Points from the 2021 ATP Finals will also be dropped at the end of the tournament. These points will not be replaced by other results.

Seed	Rank	Player	Points before	Points dropped from 2021 ATP Finals	Points defending (or 19th best result)^{†}	Points won	Points after	Status
1	1	(Spain) Carlos Alcaraz	6,730	—	90	180	6,820	Quarterfinals retired against (Denmark) Holger Rune
2	2	(Spain) Rafael Nadal	5,810	—	(0)	10	5,820	Second round lost to (United States) Tommy Paul
3	4	(Norway) Casper Ruud	5,510	400	180	90	5,020	Third round lost to (Italy) Lorenzo Musetti
4	3	Daniil Medvedev	5,655	1,000	600	10	4,065	Second round lost to (Australia) Alex de Minaur
5	5	(Greece) Stefanos Tsitsipas	5,035	0	(45)	360	5,350	Semifinals lost to (Serbia) Novak Djokovic [6]
6	7	(Serbia) Novak Djokovic	4,320	600	1,000	600	3,320	Runner-up, lost to (Denmark) Holger Rune
7	9	Andrey Rublev	3,685	200	(45)	90	3,530	Third round lost to (Denmark) Holger Rune
8	8	(Canada) Félix Auger-Aliassime	3,725	—	(90)	360	3,995	Semifinals lost to (Denmark) Holger Rune
9	11	(United States) Taylor Fritz	3,090	—	180	45	2,955	Second round lost to (France) Gilles Simon (WC)
10	10	(Poland) Hubert Hurkacz	3,220	0	360	45	2,905	Second round lost to (Denmark) Holger Rune
11	12	(Italy) Jannik Sinner	2,610	200	10	10	2,410	First round lost to (Switzerland) Marc-Andrea Hüsler (Q)
12	13	(United Kingdom) Cameron Norrie	2,490	0	90	45	2,445	Second round lost to (France) Corentin Moutet (Q)
13	15	(Italy) Matteo Berrettini	2,375	0	(0)	0	2,375	Withdrew due to foot injury
14	14	(Spain) Pablo Carreño Busta	2,450	—	45	90	2,495	Third round lost to (United States) Tommy Paul
15	17	(Croatia) Marin Čilić	2,140	—	45	10	2,105	First round lost to (Italy) Lorenzo Musetti
16	21	(United States) Frances Tiafoe	1,920	—	10	180	2,090	Quarterfinals lost to (Canada) Félix Auger-Aliassime [8]

† This column shows either the player's points from the 2021 tournament or his 19th best result (shown in brackets). Only ranking points counting towards the player's ranking as of October 31, 2022, are reflected in the column.

=== Withdrawn players ===
The following player would have been seeded, but withdrew before the tournament began.

Rank	Player	Points before	Points dropped from 2021 ATP Finals	Points defending (or 19th best result)	Points after	Withdrawal reason
6	(Germany) Alexander Zverev	4,360	1,300	360	2,700	Right ankle injury

== Other entry information ==
=== Wildcards ===
- (France) Richard Gasquet
- (France) Adrian Mannarino
- (France) Arthur Rinderknech
- (France) Gilles Simon

=== Protected ranking ===
- (Switzerland) Stan Wawrinka

=== Withdrawals ===
- (Italy) Matteo Berrettini → replaced by (Italy) Fabio Fognini
- (United States) Jenson Brooksby → replaced by (United States) Brandon Nakashima
- (Australia) Nick Kyrgios → replaced by (United States) Sebastian Korda
- (France) Gaël Monfils → replaced by (Slovakia) Alex Molčan
- (United States) Reilly Opelka → replaced by (United States) John Isner
- (Germany) Alexander Zverev → replaced by (United Kingdom) Andy Murray

== Doubles main-draw entrants ==
=== Seeds ===
The following are the seeded teams, based on ATP rankings as of October 24, 2022.

Country	Player	Country	Player	Rank^{1}	Seed
USA	Rajeev Ram	GBR	Joe Salisbury	3	1
NED	Wesley Koolhof	GBR	Neal Skupski	7	2
ESA	Marcelo Arévalo	NED	Jean-Julien Rojer	11	3
GER	Tim Pütz	NZL	Michael Venus	19	4
ESP	Marcel Granollers	ARG	Horacio Zeballos	23	5
~~COL~~	~~Juan Sebastián Cabal~~	~~COL~~	~~Robert Farah~~	~~28~~	~~6~~
GBR	Lloyd Glasspool	FIN	Harri Heliövaara	35	7
CRO	Ivan Dodig	USA	Austin Krajicek	40	8
IND	Rohan Bopanna	NED	Matwé Middelkoop	45	9

=== Wildcards ===
- (France) Sadio Doumbia / (France) Fabien Reboul
- (France) Richard Gasquet / (France) Quentin Halys

=== Protected ranking ===
- (Mexico) Santiago González / (Poland) Łukasz Kubot

=== Alternates ===
- (Belgium) Sander Gillé / (Belgium) Joran Vliegen
- ~~(Latvia) Miķelis Lībietis / (Switzerland) Luca Margaroli~~
- (France) Adrian Mannarino / (France) Fabrice Martin

=== Withdrawals ===
- (Colombia) Juan Sebastián Cabal / (Colombia) Robert Farah → replaced by (France) Adrian Mannarino / (France) Fabrice Martin
- (Australia) Thanasi Kokkinakis / (Australia) Nick Kyrgios → replaced by (Argentina) Sebastián Báez / (Spain) Albert Ramos Viñolas
- (Croatia) Nikola Mektić / (Croatia) Mate Pavić → replaced by (Monaco) Hugo Nys / (Poland) Jan Zieliński
- (Argentina) Andrés Molteni / (Argentina) Diego Schwartzman → replaced by (Latvia) Miķelis Lībietis / (Switzerland) Luca Margaroli
- (Denmark) Holger Rune / (Greece) Stefanos Tsitsipas → replaced by (Belgium) Sander Gillé / (Belgium) Joran Vliegen
