= 2022 Rolex Paris Masters – Doubles =

Doubles
- 2022 Rolex Paris Masters

Final
- Champions: (Netherlands) Wesley Koolhof (United Kingdom) Neal Skupski
- Runners-up: (Croatia) Ivan Dodig (United States) Austin Krajicek
- Score: 7–6^{(7–5)}, 6–4

Details
- Draw: 24
- Seeds: 8

Events
Singles	Doubles
- Rolex Paris Masters

Wesley Koolhof and Neal Skupski defeated Ivan Dodig and Austin Krajicek in the final, 7–6^{(7–5)}, 6–4 to win the doubles tennis title at the 2022 Paris Masters. With the win, they secured the year-end No. 1 team ranking.

Tim Pütz and Michael Venus were the defending champions, but lost in the quarterfinals to Kevin Krawietz and Andreas Mies.

Rajeev Ram and Koolhof were in contention for the ATP No. 1 doubles ranking. Koolhof secured the No. 1 spot by reaching the semifinals. Having played one fewer tournament than Neal Skupski, Koolhof will be ranked higher than the Briton at the conclusion of the tournament, despite sharing the same number of points.

== Seeds ==
All seeds received a bye into the second round.

1. (United States) Rajeev Ram / (United Kingdom) Joe Salisbury (quarterfinals)
2. (Netherlands) Wesley Koolhof / (United Kingdom) Neal Skupski (champions)
3. (El Salvador) Marcelo Arévalo / (Netherlands) Jean-Julien Rojer (second round)
4. (Germany) Tim Pütz / (New Zealand) Michael Venus (quarterfinals)
5. (Spain) Marcel Granollers / (Argentina) Horacio Zeballos (second round)
6. (Colombia) Juan Sebastián Cabal / (Colombia) Robert Farah (withdrew)
7. (United Kingdom) Lloyd Glasspool / (Finland) Harri Heliövaara (semifinals)
8. (Croatia) Ivan Dodig / (United States) Austin Krajicek (final)
9. (India) Rohan Bopanna / (Netherlands) Matwé Middelkoop (quarterfinals)

== Draw ==
Key

- Q = Qualifier
- WC = Wild card
- LL = Lucky loser
- Alt = Alternate
- ITF = ITF entry
- PR = Protected ranking
- SR = Special ranking
- SE = Special exempt
- JE = Junior exempt
- JR = Junior Accelerator Programme entrant
- CO = College Accelerator Programme entrant
- NG = Next Gen Accelerator Program entrant
- w/o = Walkover
- r = Retired
- d = Defaulted

=== Finals ===
Semifinals
8	(Croatia) Ivan Dodig (United States) Austin Krajicek	6	6
(Germany) Kevin Krawietz (Germany) Andreas Mies	3	4
7	(United Kingdom) Lloyd Glasspool (Finland) Harri Heliövaara	1	7^{7}	[6]
2	(Netherlands) Wesley Koolhof (United Kingdom) Neal Skupski	6	6^{4}	[10]

Final
8	(Croatia) Ivan Dodig (United States) Austin Krajicek	6^{5}	4
2	(Netherlands) Wesley Koolhof (United Kingdom) Neal Skupski	7^{7}	6

=== Top half ===
First round
WC	(France) S Doumbia (France) F Reboul	7	6^{4}	[15]
(Monaco) H Nys (Poland) J Zieliński	5	7^{7}	[13]
Alt	(Belgium) S Gillé (Belgium) J Vliegen	6	6
(Argentina) S Báez (Spain) A Ramos Viñolas	4	4
(France) N Mahut (France) É Roger-Vasselin	6	7
K Khachanov; A Rublev	4	5
Alt	(France) A Mannarino (France) F Martin	4	6^{5}
(Germany) K Krawietz (Germany) A Mies	6	7^{7}

Second round
1	(United States) R Ram (United Kingdom) J Salisbury	7	6^{4}	[11]
WC	(France) S Doumbia (France) F Reboul	5	7^{7}	[9]
Alt	(Belgium) S Gillé (Belgium) J Vliegen	3	6^{5}
8	(Croatia) I Dodig (United States) A Krajicek	6	7^{7}
4	(Germany) T Pütz (New Zealand) M Venus	6	3	[10]
(France) N Mahut (France) É Roger-Vasselin	2	6	[8]
(Germany) K Krawietz (Germany) A Mies	7^{7}	6^{6}	[15]
5	(Spain) M Granollers (Argentina) H Zeballos	6^{4}	7^{8}	[13]

Quarterfinals
1	(United States) R Ram (United Kingdom) J Salisbury	6	4	[6]
8	(Croatia) I Dodig (United States) A Krajicek	3	6	[10]
4	(Germany) T Pütz (New Zealand) M Venus	3	3
(Germany) K Krawietz (Germany) A Mies	6	6

Semifinals
8	(Croatia) I Dodig (United States) A Krajicek	6	6
(Germany) K Krawietz (Germany) A Mies	3	4

=== Bottom half ===
First round
(United States) M Cressy (Ecuador) G Escobar	6	4	[5]
(United Kingdom) D Evans (Australia) J Peers	3	6	[10]
WC	(France) R Gasquet (France) Q Halys	2	6^{1}
(Australia) M Ebden (United Kingdom) J Murray	6	7^{7}
(Italy) S Bolelli (Italy) F Fognini	7^{7}	6
PR	(Mexico) S González (Poland) Ł Kubot	6^{5}	3
(Brazil) R Matos (Spain) D Vega Hernández	w/o
Alt	(Latvia) M Lībietis (Switzerland) L Margaroli

Second round
7	(United Kingdom) L Glasspool (Finland) H Heliövaara	6	6^{5}	[15]
(United Kingdom) D Evans (Australia) J Peers	3	7^{7}	[13]
(Australia) M Ebden (United Kingdom) J Murray	3	6	[10]
3	(El Salvador) M Arévalo (Netherlands) J-J Rojer	6	3	[5]
9	(India) R Bopanna (Netherlands) M Middelkoop	6	7
(Italy) S Bolelli (Italy) F Fognini	4	5
(Brazil) R Matos (Spain) D Vega Hernández	7	3	[6]
2	(Netherlands) W Koolhof (United Kingdom) N Skupski	5	6	[10]

Quarterfinals
7	(United Kingdom) L Glasspool (Finland) H Heliövaara	6	7^{8}
(Australia) M Ebden (United Kingdom) J Murray	3	6^{6}
9	(India) R Bopanna (Netherlands) M Middelkoop	3	4
2	(Netherlands) W Koolhof (United Kingdom) N Skupski	6	6

Semifinals
7	(United Kingdom) L Glasspool (Finland) H Heliövaara	1	7^{7}	[6]
2	(Netherlands) W Koolhof (United Kingdom) N Skupski	6	6^{4}	[10]
