= 2022 ATP Challenger Tour =

Secondary professional tennis circuit organized by the ATP

Details
- Duration: 3 January – 4 December 2022
- Edition: 45th (14th under this name)
- Tournaments: 184
- Categories: Challenger 125 (20); Challenger 110 (1); Challenger 100 (16); Challenger 90 (13); Challenger 80 (123); Challenger 50 (11)

Achievements (singles)
- Most titles: (Argentina) Pedro Cachin (United Kingdom) Jack Draper (4)
- Most finals: (Argentina) Pedro Cachin (France) Quentin Halys (7)

The ATP Challenger Tour in 2022 was the secondary professional tennis circuit organized by the ATP. The 2022 ATP Challenger Tour calendar comprised 184 tournaments with prize money ranging from $37,520 up to $159,360. It was the 45th edition of Challenger tournaments cycle and 14th under the name of Challenger Tour.

== Schedule ==
This was the complete schedule of events on the 2022 calendar with player progression documented from the quarterfinals stage.

=== January ===
Week of	Tournament	Champions	Runners-up	Semifinalists	Quarterfinalists
January 3	Bendigo International; Bendigo, Australia; Hard – Challenger 80 – 48S/16Q/16D; Singles – Doubles	(United States) Ernesto Escobedo; 5–7, 6–3, 7–5	(France) Enzo Couacaud	(Italy) Franco Agamenone (Italy) Salvatore Caruso	(Kazakhstan) Dmitry Popko (France) Quentin Halys (France) Hugo Grenier (Czech Republic) Vít Kopřiva
January 3	Bendigo International; Bendigo, Australia; Hard – Challenger 80 – 48S/16Q/16D; Singles – Doubles	(Belgium) Ruben Bemelmans (Germany) Daniel Masur; 7–6^{(7–2)}, 6–4	(France) Enzo Couacaud (Slovenia) Blaž Rola	(Italy) Franco Agamenone (Italy) Salvatore Caruso	(Kazakhstan) Dmitry Popko (France) Quentin Halys (France) Hugo Grenier (Czech Republic) Vít Kopřiva
January 3	Traralgon International; Traralgon, Australia; Hard – Challenger 80 – 48S/16Q/16D; Singles – Doubles	(Czech Republic) Tomáš Macháč; 7–6^{(7–2)}, 6–3	(United States) Bjorn Fratangelo	(Netherlands) Jesper de Jong (United States) Mitchell Krueger	(France) Gilles Simon (Kazakhstan) Mikhail Kukushkin (Croatia) Nino Serdarušić (Czech Republic) Jiří Lehečka
January 3	Traralgon International; Traralgon, Australia; Hard – Challenger 80 – 48S/16Q/16D; Singles – Doubles	(France) Manuel Guinard (Czech Republic) Zdeněk Kolář; 6–3, 6–4	(Switzerland) Marc-Andrea Hüsler (Switzerland) Dominic Stricker	(Netherlands) Jesper de Jong (United States) Mitchell Krueger	(France) Gilles Simon (Kazakhstan) Mikhail Kukushkin (Croatia) Nino Serdarušić (Czech Republic) Jiří Lehečka
January 3	Challenger de Tigre; Tigre, Argentina; Clay – Challenger 50 – 32S/24Q/16D; Singles – Doubles	(Argentina) Santiago Rodríguez Taverna; 6–4, 6–2	(Argentina) Facundo Díaz Acosta	(Bolivia) Murkel Dellien (Chile) Gonzalo Lama	(Argentina) Román Andrés Burruchaga (Argentina) Gonzalo Villanueva (Brazil) José Pereira (Argentina) Hernán Casanova
January 3	Challenger de Tigre; Tigre, Argentina; Clay – Challenger 50 – 32S/24Q/16D; Singles – Doubles	(Peru) Conner Huertas del Pino (Germany) Mats Rosenkranz; 5–6 ret.	(Argentina) Matías Franco Descotte (Argentina) Facundo Díaz Acosta	(Bolivia) Murkel Dellien (Chile) Gonzalo Lama	(Argentina) Román Andrés Burruchaga (Argentina) Gonzalo Villanueva (Brazil) José Pereira (Argentina) Hernán Casanova
January 3	Città di Forlì; Forlì, Italy; Hard (i) – Challenger 50 – 32S/24Q/16D; Singles – Doubles	(Italy) Luca Nardi; 6–3, 6–1	(India) Mukund Sasikumar	(Hungary) Zsombor Piros (Germany) Cedrik-Marcel Stebe	(United Kingdom) Jay Clarke (Morocco) Elliot Benchetrit (United States) Christian Harrison (Italy) Luca Potenza
January 3	Città di Forlì; Forlì, Italy; Hard (i) – Challenger 50 – 32S/24Q/16D; Singles – Doubles	(Italy) Marco Bortolotti (India) Arjun Kadhe; 7–6^{(7–5)}, 6–2	(Belgium) Michael Geerts (United States) Alexander Ritschard	(Hungary) Zsombor Piros (Germany) Cedrik-Marcel Stebe	(United Kingdom) Jay Clarke (Morocco) Elliot Benchetrit (United States) Christian Harrison (Italy) Luca Potenza
January 10	Città di Forlì II; Forlì, Italy; Hard (i) – Challenger 80 – 32S/24Q/16D; Singles – Doubles	(United Kingdom) Jack Draper; 6–3, 6–0	(United Kingdom) Jay Clarke	(Hungary) Zsombor Piros (Bulgaria) Adrian Andreev	(Canada) Vasek Pospisil (United States) Alexander Ritschard (United Kingdom) Paul Jubb (France) Evan Furness
January 10	Città di Forlì II; Forlì, Italy; Hard (i) – Challenger 80 – 32S/24Q/16D; Singles – Doubles	(France) Sadio Doumbia (France) Fabien Reboul; 6–2, 6–3	(Colombia) Nicolás Mejía (United States) Alexander Ritschard	(Hungary) Zsombor Piros (Bulgaria) Adrian Andreev	(Canada) Vasek Pospisil (United States) Alexander Ritschard (United Kingdom) Paul Jubb (France) Evan Furness
January 10	Blumenau Challenger; Blumenau, Brazil; Clay – Challenger 50 – 32S/24Q/16D; Singles – Doubles	(Brazil) Igor Marcondes; 3–6, 7–5, 6–1	(Argentina) Juan Bautista Torres	(Argentina) Genaro Alberto Olivieri (Argentina) Juan Pablo Paz	(United States) Nicolas Moreno de Alboran (Argentina) Facundo Juárez (Argentina) Gonzalo Villanueva (Argentina) Facundo Díaz Acosta
January 10	Blumenau Challenger; Blumenau, Brazil; Clay – Challenger 50 – 32S/24Q/16D; Singles – Doubles	(Bolivia) Boris Arias (Bolivia) Federico Zeballos; 7–6^{(7–3)}, 6–1	(Ecuador) Diego Hidalgo (Colombia) Cristian Rodríguez	(Argentina) Genaro Alberto Olivieri (Argentina) Juan Pablo Paz	(United States) Nicolas Moreno de Alboran (Argentina) Facundo Juárez (Argentina) Gonzalo Villanueva (Argentina) Facundo Díaz Acosta
January 17	Città di Forlì III; Forlì, Italy; Hard (i) – Challenger 80 – 32S/24Q/16D; Singles – Doubles	(Russia) Pavel Kotov; 7–5, 6–7^{(5–7)}, 6–3	(France) Quentin Halys	(Portugal) Frederico Ferreira Silva (Germany) Cedrik-Marcel Stebe	(Canada) Vasek Pospisil (Czech Republic) Lukáš Rosol (Italy) Franco Agamenone (Italy) Gian Marco Moroni
January 17	Città di Forlì III; Forlì, Italy; Hard (i) – Challenger 80 – 32S/24Q/16D; Singles – Doubles	(Romania) Victor Vlad Cornea (Germany) Fabian Fallert; 6–4, 6–7^{(6–8)}, [10–7]	(Czech Republic) Jonáš Forejtek (Netherlands) Jelle Sels	(Portugal) Frederico Ferreira Silva (Germany) Cedrik-Marcel Stebe	(Canada) Vasek Pospisil (Czech Republic) Lukáš Rosol (Italy) Franco Agamenone (Italy) Gian Marco Moroni
January 17	Challenger Concepción; Concepción, Chile; Clay – Challenger 80 – 32S/24Q/16D; Singles – Doubles	(Colombia) Daniel Elahi Galán; 6–1, 3–6, 6–3	(Argentina) Santiago Rodríguez Taverna	(Bolivia) Hugo Dellien (Chile) Gonzalo Lama	(Brazil) Pedro Sakamoto (Argentina) Camilo Ugo Carabelli (Argentina) Francisco Cerúndolo (Argentina) Facundo Mena
January 17	Challenger Concepción; Concepción, Chile; Clay – Challenger 80 – 32S/24Q/16D; Singles – Doubles	(Ecuador) Diego Hidalgo (Colombia) Cristian Rodríguez; 6–2, 6–0	(Argentina) Francisco Cerúndolo (Argentina) Camilo Ugo Carabelli	(Bolivia) Hugo Dellien (Chile) Gonzalo Lama	(Brazil) Pedro Sakamoto (Argentina) Camilo Ugo Carabelli (Argentina) Francisco Cerúndolo (Argentina) Facundo Mena
January 24	Open Quimper Bretagne; Quimper, France; Hard (i) – Challenger 80 – 32S/24Q/16D; Singles – Doubles	(Canada) Vasek Pospisil; 6–4, 3–6, 6–1	(France) Grégoire Barrère	(Austria) Dennis Novak (Japan) Hiroki Moriya	(Russia) Andrey Kuznetsov (Portugal) João Sousa (Netherlands) Tim van Rijthoven (France) Alexandre Müller
January 24	Open Quimper Bretagne; Quimper, France; Hard (i) – Challenger 80 – 32S/24Q/16D; Singles – Doubles	(France) Albano Olivetti (Spain) David Vega Hernández; 3–6, 6–4, [10–8]	(Netherlands) Sander Arends (Netherlands) David Pel	(Austria) Dennis Novak (Japan) Hiroki Moriya	(Russia) Andrey Kuznetsov (Portugal) João Sousa (Netherlands) Tim van Rijthoven (France) Alexandre Müller
January 24	Columbus Challenger; Columbus, United States; Hard (i) – Challenger 80 – 32S/24Q/16D; Singles – Doubles	(Japan) Yoshihito Nishioka; 6–2, 6–4	(Switzerland) Dominic Stricker	(United States) Jenson Brooksby (Austria) Jurij Rodionov	(United States) Ernesto Escobedo (Ecuador) Emilio Gómez (Denmark) Mikael Torpegaard (United States) Jack Sock
January 24	Columbus Challenger; Columbus, United States; Hard (i) – Challenger 80 – 32S/24Q/16D; Singles – Doubles	(United States) Tennys Sandgren (Denmark) Mikael Torpegaard; 5–7, 6–4, [10–5]	(Switzerland) Luca Margaroli (Japan) Yasutaka Uchiyama	(United States) Jenson Brooksby (Austria) Jurij Rodionov	(United States) Ernesto Escobedo (Ecuador) Emilio Gómez (Denmark) Mikael Torpegaard (United States) Jack Sock
January 24	Santa Cruz Challenger; Santa Cruz de la Sierra, Bolivia; Clay – Challenger 80 – 32S/24Q/16D; Singles – Doubles	(Argentina) Francisco Cerúndolo; 6–4, 6–3	(Argentina) Camilo Ugo Carabelli	(Bolivia) Hugo Dellien (Argentina) Pedro Cachin	(Peru) Nicolás Álvarez (United States) Nicolas Moreno de Alboran (Bolivia) Murkel Dellien (Spain) Fernando Verdasco
January 24	Santa Cruz Challenger; Santa Cruz de la Sierra, Bolivia; Clay – Challenger 80 – 32S/24Q/16D; Singles – Doubles	(Ecuador) Diego Hidalgo (Colombia) Cristian Rodríguez; 4–6, 6–3, [10–8]	(Slovakia) Andrej Martin (Austria) Tristan-Samuel Weissborn	(Bolivia) Hugo Dellien (Argentina) Pedro Cachin	(Peru) Nicolás Álvarez (United States) Nicolas Moreno de Alboran (Bolivia) Murkel Dellien (Spain) Fernando Verdasco
January 31	Cleveland Open; Cleveland, United States; Hard (i) – Challenger 80 – 32S/24Q/16D; Singles – Doubles	(Switzerland) Dominic Stricker; 7–5, 6–1	(Japan) Yoshihito Nishioka	(Italy) Thomas Fabbiano (United States) Michael Mmoh	(Germany) Cedrik-Marcel Stebe (United States) William Blumberg (Canada) Alexis Galarneau (United States) Ernesto Escobedo
January 31	Cleveland Open; Cleveland, United States; Hard (i) – Challenger 80 – 32S/24Q/16D; Singles – Doubles	(United States) William Blumberg (United States) Max Schnur; 6–3, 7–6^{(7–4)}	(United States) Robert Galloway (United States) Jackson Withrow	(Italy) Thomas Fabbiano (United States) Michael Mmoh	(Germany) Cedrik-Marcel Stebe (United States) William Blumberg (Canada) Alexis Galarneau (United States) Ernesto Escobedo

=== February ===
Week of	Tournament	Champions	Runners-up	Semifinalists	Quarterfinalists
February 7	Bengaluru Open; Bangalore, India; Hard – Challenger 80 – 32S/24Q/16D; Singles – Doubles	(Chinese Taipei) Tseng Chun-hsin; 6–4, 7–5	(Croatia) Borna Gojo	(France) Enzo Couacaud (France) Alexandre Müller	(Czech Republic) Jiří Veselý (Brazil) Gabriel Décamps (Belgium) Kimmer Coppejans (Turkey) Cem İlkel
February 7	Bengaluru Open; Bangalore, India; Hard – Challenger 80 – 32S/24Q/16D; Singles – Doubles	(India) Saketh Myneni (India) Ramkumar Ramanathan; 6–3, 6–2	(France) Hugo Grenier (France) Alexandre Müller	(France) Enzo Couacaud (France) Alexandre Müller	(Czech Republic) Jiří Veselý (Brazil) Gabriel Décamps (Belgium) Kimmer Coppejans (Turkey) Cem İlkel
February 7	Challenger La Manche; Cherbourg, France; Hard (i) – Challenger 80 – 32S/24Q/16D; Singles – Doubles	(France) Benjamin Bonzi; 6–4, 2–6, 6–4	(France) Constant Lestienne	(Belgium) Zizou Bergs (Latvia) Ernests Gulbis	(United Kingdom) Jack Draper (Belgium) Ruben Bemelmans (France) Luca Van Assche (France) Pierre-Hugues Herbert
February 7	Challenger La Manche; Cherbourg, France; Hard (i) – Challenger 80 – 32S/24Q/16D; Singles – Doubles	(France) Jonathan Eysseric (France) Quentin Halys; 7–6^{(8–6)}, 6–2	(Germany) Hendrik Jebens (Germany) Niklas Schell	(Belgium) Zizou Bergs (Latvia) Ernests Gulbis	(United Kingdom) Jack Draper (Belgium) Ruben Bemelmans (France) Luca Van Assche (France) Pierre-Hugues Herbert
February 14	Bengaluru Open II; Bangalore, India; Hard – Challenger 80 – 32S/24Q/16D; Singles – Doubles	(Australia) Aleksandar Vukic; 6–4, 6–4	(Bulgaria) Dimitar Kuzmanov	(Croatia) Borna Gojo (France) Enzo Couacaud	(Australia) Max Purcell (Switzerland) Antoine Bellier (Switzerland) Johan Nikles (France) Mathias Bourgue
February 14	Bengaluru Open II; Bangalore, India; Hard – Challenger 80 – 32S/24Q/16D; Singles – Doubles	(Austria) Alexander Erler (India) Arjun Kadhe; 6–3, 6–7^{(4–7)}, [10–7]	(India) Saketh Myneni (India) Ramkumar Ramanathan	(Croatia) Borna Gojo (France) Enzo Couacaud	(Australia) Max Purcell (Switzerland) Antoine Bellier (Switzerland) Johan Nikles (France) Mathias Bourgue
February 14	Città di Forlì IV; Forlì, Italy; Hard (i) – Challenger 80 – 32S/24Q/16D; Singles – Doubles	(United Kingdom) Jack Draper; 6–1, 6–2	(Netherlands) Tim van Rijthoven	(Japan) Yosuke Watanuki (Portugal) Nuno Borges	(France) Evan Furness (France) Grégoire Barrère (France) Constant Lestienne (Netherlands) Robin Haase
February 14	Città di Forlì IV; Forlì, Italy; Hard (i) – Challenger 80 – 32S/24Q/16D; Singles – Doubles	(Romania) Victor Vlad Cornea (Germany) Fabian Fallert; 6–4, 3–6, [10–2]	(Croatia) Antonio Šančić (Slovakia) Igor Zelenay	(Japan) Yosuke Watanuki (Portugal) Nuno Borges	(France) Evan Furness (France) Grégoire Barrère (France) Constant Lestienne (Netherlands) Robin Haase
February 21	Teréga Open Pau–Pyrénées; Pau, France; Hard (i) – Challenger 100 – 32S/24Q/16D; Singles – Doubles	(France) Quentin Halys; 4–6, 6–4, 6–3	(Canada) Vasek Pospisil	(France) Manuel Guinard (Russia) Roman Safiullin	(France) Antoine Escoffier (France) Gilles Simon (France) Grégoire Barrère (France) Constant Lestienne
February 21	Teréga Open Pau–Pyrénées; Pau, France; Hard (i) – Challenger 100 – 32S/24Q/16D; Singles – Doubles	(France) Albano Olivetti (Spain) David Vega Hernández; Walkover	(Poland) Karol Drzewiecki (Poland) Kacper Żuk	(France) Manuel Guinard (Russia) Roman Safiullin	(France) Antoine Escoffier (France) Gilles Simon (France) Grégoire Barrère (France) Constant Lestienne
February 21	Città di Forlì V Forlì, Italy; Hard (i) – Challenger 80 – 32S/24Q/16D; Singles – Doubles	(United Kingdom) Jack Draper; 3–6, 6–3, 7–6^{(10–8)}	(United States) Alexander Ritschard	(Netherlands) Tim van Rijthoven (Bosnia and Herzegovina) Mirza Bašić	(Czech Republic) Tomáš Macháč (Portugal) Nuno Borges (Slovakia) Filip Horanský (United States) Michael Mmoh
February 21	Città di Forlì V Forlì, Italy; Hard (i) – Challenger 80 – 32S/24Q/16D; Singles – Doubles	(Italy) Marco Bortolotti (Ukraine) Vitaliy Sachko; 7–6^{(7–5)}, 3–6, [10–5]	(Romania) Victor Vlad Cornea (Germany) Fabian Fallert	(Netherlands) Tim van Rijthoven (Bosnia and Herzegovina) Mirza Bašić	(Czech Republic) Tomáš Macháč (Portugal) Nuno Borges (Slovakia) Filip Horanský (United States) Michael Mmoh
February 28	Gran Canaria Challenger; Las Palmas, Spain; Clay – Challenger 80 – 32S/24Q/16D; Singles – Doubles	(Italy) Gianluca Mager; 7–6^{(8–6)}, 6–2	(Spain) Roberto Carballés Baena	(Croatia) Duje Ajduković (Italy) Riccardo Bonadio	(Switzerland) Johan Nikles (Italy) Salvatore Caruso (United States) Nicolas Moreno de Alboran (Italy) Raúl Brancaccio
February 28	Gran Canaria Challenger; Las Palmas, Spain; Clay – Challenger 80 – 32S/24Q/16D; Singles – Doubles	(France) Sadio Doumbia (France) Fabien Reboul; 5–7, 6–4, [10–7]	(Italy) Matteo Arnaldi (Italy) Luciano Darderi	(Croatia) Duje Ajduković (Italy) Riccardo Bonadio	(Switzerland) Johan Nikles (Italy) Salvatore Caruso (United States) Nicolas Moreno de Alboran (Italy) Raúl Brancaccio
February 28	Torino Challenger; Turin, Italy; Hard (i) – Challenger 80 – 32S/24Q/16D; Singles – Doubles	(Germany) Mats Moraing; 7–6^{(13–11)}, 6–3	(France) Quentin Halys	(Netherlands) Jelle Sels (Canada) Vasek Pospisil	(Germany) Daniel Masur (United States) Michael Mmoh (France) Antoine Escoffier (Romania) Filip Cristian Jianu
February 28	Torino Challenger; Turin, Italy; Hard (i) – Challenger 80 – 32S/24Q/16D; Singles – Doubles	(Belgium) Ruben Bemelmans (Germany) Daniel Masur; 3–6, 6–3, [10–8]	(Netherlands) Sander Arends (Netherlands) David Pel	(Netherlands) Jelle Sels (Canada) Vasek Pospisil	(Germany) Daniel Masur (United States) Michael Mmoh (France) Antoine Escoffier (Romania) Filip Cristian Jianu

=== March ===
Week of	Tournament	Champions	Runners-up	Semifinalists	Quarterfinalists
March 7	Monterrey Challenger; Monterrey, Mexico; Hard – Challenger 100 – 32S/24Q/16D; Singles – Doubles	(Spain) Fernando Verdasco; 4–6, 6–3, 7–6^{(7–3)}	(India) Prajnesh Gunneswaran	(United States) Christian Harrison (Japan) Go Soeda	(United States) Michael Mmoh (France) Geoffrey Blancaneaux (Chinese Taipei) Jason Jung (United States) Ulises Blanch
March 7	Monterrey Challenger; Monterrey, Mexico; Hard – Challenger 100 – 32S/24Q/16D; Singles – Doubles	(Mexico) Hans Hach Verdugo (United States) Austin Krajicek; 6–0, 6–3	(United States) Robert Galloway (Australia) John-Patrick Smith	(United States) Christian Harrison (Japan) Go Soeda	(United States) Michael Mmoh (France) Geoffrey Blancaneaux (Chinese Taipei) Jason Jung (United States) Ulises Blanch
March 7	Challenger de Santiago; Santiago, Chile; Clay – Challenger 80 – 32S/24Q/16D; Singles – Doubles	(Bolivia) Hugo Dellien; 6–3, 4–6, 6–4	(Chile) Alejandro Tabilo	(Argentina) Tomás Martín Etcheverry (Peru) Juan Pablo Varillas	(Czech Republic) Jiří Lehečka (Netherlands) Jesper de Jong (Brazil) Matheus Pucinelli de Almeida (Czech Republic) Vít Kopřiva
March 7	Challenger de Santiago; Santiago, Chile; Clay – Challenger 80 – 32S/24Q/16D; Singles – Doubles	(Ecuador) Diego Hidalgo (Colombia) Cristian Rodríguez; 6–4, 6–4	(Argentina) Pedro Cachin (Argentina) Facundo Mena	(Argentina) Tomás Martín Etcheverry (Peru) Juan Pablo Varillas	(Czech Republic) Jiří Lehečka (Netherlands) Jesper de Jong (Brazil) Matheus Pucinelli de Almeida (Czech Republic) Vít Kopřiva
March 7	Challenger di Roseto degli Abruzzi; Roseto degli Abruzzi, Italy; Clay – Challenger 80 – 32S/24Q/16D; Singles – Doubles	(Spain) Carlos Taberner; 6–2, 6–3	(Portugal) Nuno Borges	(Spain) Nikolás Sánchez Izquierdo (Italy) Flavio Cobolli	(Spain) Carlos Gimeno Valero (Czech Republic) Lukáš Rosol (Italy) Andrea Arnaboldi (Kazakhstan) Timofey Skatov
March 7	Challenger di Roseto degli Abruzzi; Roseto degli Abruzzi, Italy; Clay – Challenger 80 – 32S/24Q/16D; Singles – Doubles	(Monaco) Hugo Nys (Poland) Jan Zieliński; 7–6^{(7–2)}, 4–6, [10–3]	(Czech Republic) Roman Jebavý (Austria) Philipp Oswald	(Spain) Nikolás Sánchez Izquierdo (Italy) Flavio Cobolli	(Spain) Carlos Gimeno Valero (Czech Republic) Lukáš Rosol (Italy) Andrea Arnaboldi (Kazakhstan) Timofey Skatov
March 14	Arizona Tennis Classic; Phoenix, United States; Hard – Challenger 125 – 32S/24Q/16D; Singles – Doubles	(United States) Denis Kudla; 2–6, 6–2, 6–3	(Germany) Daniel Altmaier	(United Kingdom) Liam Broady (United States) J. J. Wolf	(Moldova) Radu Albot (Belgium) David Goffin (France) Richard Gasquet (Spain) Fernando Verdasco
March 14	Arizona Tennis Classic; Phoenix, United States; Hard – Challenger 125 – 32S/24Q/16D; Singles – Doubles	(Philippines) Treat Huey (United States) Denis Kudla; 7–6^{(12–10)}, 3–6, [10–6]	(Germany) Oscar Otte (Germany) Jan-Lennard Struff	(United Kingdom) Liam Broady (United States) J. J. Wolf	(Moldova) Radu Albot (Belgium) David Goffin (France) Richard Gasquet (Spain) Fernando Verdasco
March 14	Challenger del Biobío; Concepción, Chile; Clay – Challenger 80 – 32S/24Q/16D; Singles – Doubles	(Argentina) Tomás Martín Etcheverry; 6–3, 6–2	(Bolivia) Hugo Dellien	(Chile) Tomás Barrios Vera (Argentina) Renzo Olivo	(Argentina) Thiago Agustín Tirante (Brazil) Matheus Pucinelli de Almeida (Argentina) Camilo Ugo Carabelli (Peru) Juan Pablo Varillas
March 14	Challenger del Biobío; Concepción, Chile; Clay – Challenger 80 – 32S/24Q/16D; Singles – Doubles	(Argentina) Andrea Collarini (Argentina) Renzo Olivo; 6–4, 6–4	(Ecuador) Diego Hidalgo (Colombia) Cristian Rodríguez	(Chile) Tomás Barrios Vera (Argentina) Renzo Olivo	(Argentina) Thiago Agustín Tirante (Brazil) Matheus Pucinelli de Almeida (Argentina) Camilo Ugo Carabelli (Peru) Juan Pablo Varillas
March 14	Challenger di Roseto degli Abruzzi II; Roseto degli Abruzzi, Italy; Clay – Challenger 80 – 32S/24Q/16D; Singles – Doubles	(France) Manuel Guinard; 6–1, 6–2	(Chinese Taipei) Tseng Chun-hsin	(Kazakhstan) Timofey Skatov (Italy) Alessandro Giannessi	(Croatia) Nino Serdarušić (Spain) Carlos Taberner (Slovakia) Jozef Kovalík (Hungary) Zsombor Piros
March 14	Challenger di Roseto degli Abruzzi II; Roseto degli Abruzzi, Italy; Clay – Challenger 80 – 32S/24Q/16D; Singles – Doubles	(Italy) Franco Agamenone (France) Manuel Guinard; 7–6^{(7–2)}, 7–6^{(7–3)}	(Serbia) Ivan Sabanov (Serbia) Matej Sabanov	(Kazakhstan) Timofey Skatov (Italy) Alessandro Giannessi	(Croatia) Nino Serdarušić (Spain) Carlos Taberner (Slovakia) Jozef Kovalík (Hungary) Zsombor Piros
March 21	Play In Challenger; Lille, France; Hard (i) – Challenger 90 – 32S/24Q/16D; Singles – Doubles	(France) Quentin Halys; 4–6, 7–6^{(7–4)}, 6–4	(Lithuania) Ričardas Berankis	(Czech Republic) Jonáš Forejtek (France) Constant Lestienne	(Canada) Alexis Galarneau (Tunisia) Malek Jaziri (France) Arthur Fils (Belgium) Zizou Bergs
March 21	Play In Challenger; Lille, France; Hard (i) – Challenger 90 – 32S/24Q/16D; Singles – Doubles	(Norway) Viktor Durasovic (Finland) Patrik Niklas-Salminen; 7–5, 7–6^{(7–1)}	(France) Jonathan Eysseric (France) Quentin Halys	(Czech Republic) Jonáš Forejtek (France) Constant Lestienne	(Canada) Alexis Galarneau (Tunisia) Malek Jaziri (France) Arthur Fils (Belgium) Zizou Bergs
March 21	Challenger Biel/Bienne; Biel/Bienne, Switzerland; Hard (i) – Challenger 80 – 32S/24Q/16D; Singles – Doubles	(Austria) Jurij Rodionov; 7–6^{(7–3)}, 6–4	(Poland) Kacper Żuk	(Slovakia) Filip Horanský (Switzerland) Dominic Stricker	(Czech Republic) Marek Gengel (Switzerland) Leandro Riedi (Netherlands) Tim van Rijthoven (France) Antoine Escoffier
March 21	Challenger Biel/Bienne; Biel/Bienne, Switzerland; Hard (i) – Challenger 80 – 32S/24Q/16D; Singles – Doubles	(France) Pierre-Hugues Herbert (France) Albano Olivetti; 6–3, 6–4	(India) Purav Raja (India) Ramkumar Ramanathan	(Slovakia) Filip Horanský (Switzerland) Dominic Stricker	(Czech Republic) Marek Gengel (Switzerland) Leandro Riedi (Netherlands) Tim van Rijthoven (France) Antoine Escoffier
March 21	Zadar Open; Zadar, Croatia; Clay – Challenger 80 – 32S/24Q/16D; Singles – Doubles	(Italy) Flavio Cobolli; 6–4, 6–2	(Poland) Daniel Michalski	(Spain) Carlos Sánchez Jover (France) Manuel Guinard	(Croatia) Duje Ajduković (Czech Republic) Dalibor Svrčina (Italy) Andrea Vavassori (Spain) Eduard Esteve Lobato
March 21	Zadar Open; Zadar, Croatia; Clay – Challenger 80 – 32S/24Q/16D; Singles – Doubles	(Czech Republic) Zdeněk Kolář (Italy) Andrea Vavassori; 3–6, 7–6^{(9–7)}, [10–6]	(Italy) Franco Agamenone (France) Manuel Guinard	(Spain) Carlos Sánchez Jover (France) Manuel Guinard	(Croatia) Duje Ajduković (Czech Republic) Dalibor Svrčina (Italy) Andrea Vavassori (Spain) Eduard Esteve Lobato
March 21	Santa Cruz Challenger II; Santa Cruz de la Sierra, Bolivia; Clay – Challenger 80 – 32S/24Q/16D; Singles – Doubles	(United Kingdom) Paul Jubb; 6–3, 7–6^{(7–5)}	(Peru) Juan Pablo Varillas	(Brazil) Daniel Dutra da Silva (Uruguay) Pablo Cuevas	(Argentina) Hernán Casanova (Chile) Tomás Barrios Vera (Argentina) Facundo Mena (Argentina) Genaro Alberto Olivieri
March 21	Santa Cruz Challenger II; Santa Cruz de la Sierra, Bolivia; Clay – Challenger 80 – 32S/24Q/16D; Singles – Doubles	(Netherlands) Jesper de Jong (Netherlands) Bart Stevens; 6–4, 3–6, [10–6]	(Colombia) Nicolás Barrientos (Mexico) Miguel Ángel Reyes-Varela	(Brazil) Daniel Dutra da Silva (Uruguay) Pablo Cuevas	(Argentina) Hernán Casanova (Chile) Tomás Barrios Vera (Argentina) Facundo Mena (Argentina) Genaro Alberto Olivieri
March 28	Andalucía Challenger; Marbella, Spain; Clay – Challenger 125 – 32S/24Q/16D; Singles – Doubles	(Spain) Jaume Munar; 6–2, 6–2	(Argentina) Pedro Cachin	(Spain) Pablo Andújar (Czech Republic) Jiří Veselý	(Germany) Philipp Kohlschreiber (Chinese Taipei) Tseng Chun-hsin (Spain) Roberto Carballés Baena (Slovakia) Alex Molčan
March 28	Andalucía Challenger; Marbella, Spain; Clay – Challenger 125 – 32S/24Q/16D; Singles – Doubles	(Czech Republic) Roman Jebavý (Austria) Philipp Oswald; 7–6^{(8–6)}, 3–6, [10–3]	(Monaco) Hugo Nys (Poland) Jan Zieliński	(Spain) Pablo Andújar (Czech Republic) Jiří Veselý	(Germany) Philipp Kohlschreiber (Chinese Taipei) Tseng Chun-hsin (Spain) Roberto Carballés Baena (Slovakia) Alex Molčan
March 28	Challenger Città di Lugano; Lugano, Switzerland; Hard (i) – Challenger 80 – 32S/24Q/16D; Singles – Doubles	(Italy) Luca Nardi; 4–6, 6–2, 6–3	(Switzerland) Leandro Riedi	(France) Pierre-Hugues Herbert (Germany) Cedrik-Marcel Stebe	(Switzerland) Marc-Andrea Hüsler (Romania) Marius Copil (Austria) Jurij Rodionov (Switzerland) Jérôme Kym
March 28	Challenger Città di Lugano; Lugano, Switzerland; Hard (i) – Challenger 80 – 32S/24Q/16D; Singles – Doubles	(Belgium) Ruben Bemelmans (Germany) Daniel Masur; 6–4, 6–7^{(5–7)}, [10–7]	(Switzerland) Jérôme Kym (Switzerland) Leandro Riedi	(France) Pierre-Hugues Herbert (Germany) Cedrik-Marcel Stebe	(Switzerland) Marc-Andrea Hüsler (Romania) Marius Copil (Austria) Jurij Rodionov (Switzerland) Jérôme Kym
March 28	Open de Oeiras; Oeiras, Portugal; Clay – Challenger 80 – 32S/24Q/16D; Singles – Doubles	(Portugal) Gastão Elias; 6–3, 6–4	(Croatia) Nino Serdarušić	(Portugal) Nuno Borges (Italy) Alessandro Giannessi	(United States) Noah Rubin (Brazil) Thiago Monteiro (Italy) Giulio Zeppieri (Czech Republic) Vít Kopřiva
March 28	Open de Oeiras; Oeiras, Portugal; Clay – Challenger 80 – 32S/24Q/16D; Singles – Doubles	(Portugal) Nuno Borges (Portugal) Francisco Cabral; 6–3, 6–0	(Uzbekistan) Sanjar Fayziev (Greece) Markos Kalovelonis	(Portugal) Nuno Borges (Italy) Alessandro Giannessi	(United States) Noah Rubin (Brazil) Thiago Monteiro (Italy) Giulio Zeppieri (Czech Republic) Vít Kopřiva
March 28	Open Harmonie mutuelle Saint-Brieuc, France; Hard (i) – Challenger 80 – 32S/24Q/16D; Singles – Doubles	(United Kingdom) Jack Draper; 6–2, 5–7, 6–4	(Belgium) Zizou Bergs	(France) Antoine Escoffier (France) Quentin Halys	(United Kingdom) Ryan Peniston (France) Evan Furness (Germany) Benjamin Hassan (United Kingdom) Alastair Gray
March 28	Open Harmonie mutuelle Saint-Brieuc, France; Hard (i) – Challenger 80 – 32S/24Q/16D; Singles – Doubles	(Netherlands) Sander Arends (Netherlands) David Pel; 6–3, 6–3	(France) Jonathan Eysseric (Netherlands) Robin Haase	(France) Antoine Escoffier (France) Quentin Halys	(United Kingdom) Ryan Peniston (France) Evan Furness (Germany) Benjamin Hassan (United Kingdom) Alastair Gray
March 28	Pereira Challenger; Pereira, Colombia; Clay – Challenger 80 – 32S/24Q/16D; Singles – Doubles	(Argentina) Facundo Bagnis; 6–3, 6–0	(Argentina) Facundo Mena	(Peru) Juan Pablo Varillas (Argentina) Tomás Martín Etcheverry	(Colombia) Nicolás Barrientos (Argentina) Thiago Agustín Tirante (Argentina) Juan Pablo Ficovich (Serbia) Peđa Krstin
March 28	Pereira Challenger; Pereira, Colombia; Clay – Challenger 80 – 32S/24Q/16D; Singles – Doubles	(Venezuela) Luis David Martínez (Colombia) Cristian Rodríguez; 7–6^{(7–2)}, 7–6^{(7–3)}	(Kazakhstan) Grigoriy Lomakin (Ukraine) Oleg Prihodko	(Peru) Juan Pablo Varillas (Argentina) Tomás Martín Etcheverry	(Colombia) Nicolás Barrientos (Argentina) Thiago Agustín Tirante (Argentina) Juan Pablo Ficovich (Serbia) Peđa Krstin

=== April ===
Week of	Tournament	Champions	Runners-up	Semifinalists	Quarterfinalists
April 4	Mexico City Open; Mexico City, Mexico; Clay – Challenger 125 – 32S/24Q/16D; Singles – Doubles	(Switzerland) Marc-Andrea Hüsler; 6–4, 6–2	(Argentina) Tomás Martín Etcheverry	(Brazil) Felipe Meligeni Alves (Chile) Nicolás Jarry	(France) Maxime Janvier (Argentina) Renzo Olivo (Austria) Gerald Melzer (Brazil) Mateus Alves
April 4	Mexico City Open; Mexico City, Mexico; Clay – Challenger 125 – 32S/24Q/16D; Singles – Doubles	(Chile) Nicolás Jarry (Brazil) Matheus Pucinelli de Almeida; 6–2, 6–3	(France) Jonathan Eysseric (New Zealand) Artem Sitak	(Brazil) Felipe Meligeni Alves (Chile) Nicolás Jarry	(France) Maxime Janvier (Argentina) Renzo Olivo (Austria) Gerald Melzer (Brazil) Mateus Alves
April 4	Open de Oeiras II; Oeiras, Portugal; Clay – Challenger 80 – 32S/24Q/16D; Singles – Doubles	(Portugal) Gastão Elias; 7–6^{(7–4)}, 6–1	(Italy) Alessandro Giannessi	(Slovakia) Jozef Kovalík (Czech Republic) Zdeněk Kolář	(Czech Republic) Lukáš Rosol (Australia) Christopher O'Connell (Hungary) Zsombor Piros (Bulgaria) Dimitar Kuzmanov
April 4	Open de Oeiras II; Oeiras, Portugal; Clay – Challenger 80 – 32S/24Q/16D; Singles – Doubles	(Portugal) Nuno Borges (Portugal) Francisco Cabral; 6–4, 6–0	(Czech Republic) Zdeněk Kolář (Czech Republic) Adam Pavlásek	(Slovakia) Jozef Kovalík (Czech Republic) Zdeněk Kolář	(Czech Republic) Lukáš Rosol (Australia) Christopher O'Connell (Hungary) Zsombor Piros (Bulgaria) Dimitar Kuzmanov
April 4	Sanremo Challenger; Sanremo, Italy; Clay – Challenger 80 – 32S/24Q/16D; Singles – Doubles	(Denmark) Holger Rune; 6–1, 2–6, 6–4	(Italy) Francesco Passaro	(Italy) Andrea Arnaboldi (Italy) Gianluca Mager	(Italy) Matteo Gigante; Alexey Vatutin (Hungary) Máté Valkusz (Italy) Thomas Fabbiano
April 4	Sanremo Challenger; Sanremo, Italy; Clay – Challenger 80 – 32S/24Q/16D; Singles – Doubles	(France) Geoffrey Blancaneaux (France) Alexandre Müller; 4–6, 6–3, [11–9]	(Italy) Flavio Cobolli (Italy) Matteo Gigante	(Italy) Andrea Arnaboldi (Italy) Gianluca Mager	(Italy) Matteo Gigante; Alexey Vatutin (Hungary) Máté Valkusz (Italy) Thomas Fabbiano
April 4	Murcia Open; Murcia, Spain; Clay – Challenger 80 – 32S/24Q/16D; Singles – Doubles	(Chinese Taipei) Tseng Chun-hsin; 6–4, 6–1	(Slovakia) Norbert Gombos	(Austria) Dennis Novak; Ivan Gakhov	(Argentina) Marco Trungelliti (Spain) Carlos Gimeno Valero (Argentina) Pedro Cachin (Czech Republic) Jonáš Forejtek
April 4	Murcia Open; Murcia, Spain; Clay – Challenger 80 – 32S/24Q/16D; Singles – Doubles	(Spain) Íñigo Cervantes (Spain) Oriol Roca Batalla; 6–7^{(4–7)}, 7–6^{(7–4)}, [10–7]	(Argentina) Pedro Cachin (Uruguay) Martín Cuevas	(Austria) Dennis Novak; Ivan Gakhov	(Argentina) Marco Trungelliti (Spain) Carlos Gimeno Valero (Argentina) Pedro Cachin (Czech Republic) Jonáš Forejtek
April 4	Salinas Challenger; Salinas, Ecuador; Hard – Challenger 80 – 32S/24Q/16D; Singles – Doubles	(Ecuador) Emilio Gómez; 6–7^{(2–7)}, 7–6^{(7–4)}, 7–5	(United States) Nicolas Moreno de Alboran	(Switzerland) Alexander Ritschard (Ecuador) Roberto Quiroz	(United States) Felix Corwin (Argentina) Camilo Ugo Carabelli (United States) JC Aragone (Argentina) Andrea Collarini
April 4	Salinas Challenger; Salinas, Ecuador; Hard – Challenger 80 – 32S/24Q/16D; Singles – Doubles	(India) Yuki Bhambri (India) Saketh Myneni; 4–6, 6–3, [10–7]	(United States) JC Aragone (Ecuador) Roberto Quiroz	(Switzerland) Alexander Ritschard (Ecuador) Roberto Quiroz	(United States) Felix Corwin (Argentina) Camilo Ugo Carabelli (United States) JC Aragone (Argentina) Andrea Collarini
April 11	Sarasota Open; Sarasota, United States; Clay – Challenger 100 – 32S/24Q/16D; Singles – Doubles	(Colombia) Daniel Elahi Galán; 7–6^{(9–7)}, 4–6, 6–1	(United States) Steve Johnson	(United States) Denis Kudla (Chile) Alejandro Tabilo	(United States) Jack Sock (United States) Mitchell Krueger (United States) J. J. Wolf (Bulgaria) Adrian Andreev
April 11	Sarasota Open; Sarasota, United States; Clay – Challenger 100 – 32S/24Q/16D; Singles – Doubles	(United States) Robert Galloway (United States) Jackson Withrow; 6–3, 7–6^{(7–3)}	(Sweden) André Göransson (United States) Nathaniel Lammons	(United States) Denis Kudla (Chile) Alejandro Tabilo	(United States) Jack Sock (United States) Mitchell Krueger (United States) J. J. Wolf (Bulgaria) Adrian Andreev
April 11	Open Città della Disfida; Barletta, Italy; Clay – Challenger 80 – 32S/24Q/16D; Singles – Doubles	(Portugal) Nuno Borges; 6–3, 7–5	(Serbia) Miljan Zekić	(Italy) Luca Nardi (Czech Republic) Zdeněk Kolář	(France) Geoffrey Blancaneaux; Alexander Shevchenko (Netherlands) Jelle Sels (Italy) Luciano Darderi
April 11	Open Città della Disfida; Barletta, Italy; Clay – Challenger 80 – 32S/24Q/16D; Singles – Doubles	Evgeny Karlovskiy; Evgenii Tiurnev; 6–3, 6–4	(Japan) Ben McLachlan (Poland) Szymon Walków	(Italy) Luca Nardi (Czech Republic) Zdeněk Kolář	(France) Geoffrey Blancaneaux; Alexander Shevchenko (Netherlands) Jelle Sels (Italy) Luciano Darderi
April 11	Open Comunidad de Madrid; Madrid, Spain; Clay – Challenger 80 – 32S/24Q/16D; Singles – Doubles	(Argentina) Pedro Cachin; 6–3, 6–7^{(3–7)}, 6–3	(Argentina) Marco Trungelliti	(Spain) Roberto Carballés Baena (Brazil) Thiago Monteiro	(France) Lucas Pouille (France) Manuel Guinard (Australia) Christopher O'Connell (Austria) Sebastian Ofner
April 11	Open Comunidad de Madrid; Madrid, Spain; Clay – Challenger 80 – 32S/24Q/16D; Singles – Doubles	(Czech Republic) Adam Pavlásek (Slovakia) Igor Zelenay; 6–3, 3–6, [10–6]	(Brazil) Rafael Matos (Spain) David Vega Hernández	(Spain) Roberto Carballés Baena (Brazil) Thiago Monteiro	(France) Lucas Pouille (France) Manuel Guinard (Australia) Christopher O'Connell (Austria) Sebastian Ofner
April 11	San Luis Open Challenger; San Luis Potosí, Mexico; Clay – Challenger 80 – 32S/24Q/16D; Singles – Doubles	(Switzerland) Antoine Bellier; 6–7^{(2–7)}, 6–4, 7–5	(Argentina) Renzo Olivo	(Switzerland) Marc-Andrea Hüsler (Chile) Nicolás Jarry	(Slovakia) Andrej Martin (China) Zhang Zhizhen (United States) Ernesto Escobedo (Brazil) Felipe Meligeni Alves
April 11	San Luis Open Challenger; San Luis Potosí, Mexico; Clay – Challenger 80 – 32S/24Q/16D; Singles – Doubles	(Colombia) Nicolás Barrientos (Mexico) Miguel Ángel Reyes-Varela; 7–6^{(13–11)}, 6–2	(Venezuela) Luis David Martínez (Brazil) Felipe Meligeni Alves	(Switzerland) Marc-Andrea Hüsler (Chile) Nicolás Jarry	(Slovakia) Andrej Martin (China) Zhang Zhizhen (United States) Ernesto Escobedo (Brazil) Felipe Meligeni Alves
April 18	Sparta Prague Open; Prague, Czech Republic; Clay – Challenger 80 – 32S/24Q/16D; Singles – Doubles	(Austria) Sebastian Ofner; 6–0, 6–4	(Czech Republic) Dalibor Svrčina	(Chinese Taipei) Tseng Chun-hsin (Czech Republic) Tomáš Macháč	(Czech Republic) Jonáš Forejtek (Spain) Javier Barranco Cosano (Italy) Lorenzo Giustino (Czech Republic) Lukáš Rosol
April 18	Sparta Prague Open; Prague, Czech Republic; Clay – Challenger 80 – 32S/24Q/16D; Singles – Doubles	(Portugal) Francisco Cabral (Poland) Szymon Walków; 6–2, 7–6^{(14–12)}	(France) Tristan Lamasine (France) Lucas Pouille	(Chinese Taipei) Tseng Chun-hsin (Czech Republic) Tomáš Macháč	(Czech Republic) Jonáš Forejtek (Spain) Javier Barranco Cosano (Italy) Lorenzo Giustino (Czech Republic) Lukáš Rosol
April 18	Split Open; Split, Croatia; Clay – Challenger 80 – 32S/24Q/16D; Singles – Doubles	(Australia) Christopher O'Connell; 6–3, 2–0 ret.	(Hungary) Zsombor Piros	(Italy) Matteo Arnaldi (Hungary) Máté Valkusz	(Italy) Andrea Arnaboldi (Poland) Kacper Żuk (Italy) Luca Nardi; Alexander Shevchenko
April 18	Split Open; Split, Croatia; Clay – Challenger 80 – 32S/24Q/16D; Singles – Doubles	(United States) Nathaniel Lammons (France) Albano Olivetti; 4–6, 7–6^{(8–6)}, [10–7]	(France) Sadio Doumbia (France) Fabien Reboul	(Italy) Matteo Arnaldi (Hungary) Máté Valkusz	(Italy) Andrea Arnaboldi (Poland) Kacper Żuk (Italy) Luca Nardi; Alexander Shevchenko
April 18	Tallahassee Tennis Challenger; Tallahassee, United States; Clay – Challenger 80 – 32S/24Q/16D; Singles – Doubles	(Chinese Taipei) Wu Tung-lin; 6–3, 6–4	(United States) Michael Mmoh	(Colombia) Daniel Elahi Galán (China) Zhang Zhizhen	(United States) Aleksandar Kovacevic (Japan) Yosuke Watanuki (United States) Christian Harrison (United States) J. J. Wolf
April 18	Tallahassee Tennis Challenger; Tallahassee, United States; Clay – Challenger 80 – 32S/24Q/16D; Singles – Doubles	(Netherlands) Gijs Brouwer (United States) Christian Harrison; 4–6, 7–5, [10–6]	(Ecuador) Diego Hidalgo (Colombia) Cristian Rodríguez	(Colombia) Daniel Elahi Galán (China) Zhang Zhizhen	(United States) Aleksandar Kovacevic (Japan) Yosuke Watanuki (United States) Christian Harrison (United States) J. J. Wolf
April 18	San Marcos Open Aguascalientes; Aguascalientes, Mexico; Clay – Challenger 80 – 32S/24Q/16D; Singles – Doubles	(Switzerland) Marc-Andrea Hüsler; 6–4, 4–6, 6–3	(Argentina) Juan Pablo Ficovich	(Romania) Filip Cristian Jianu (Italy) Federico Gaio	(Spain) Adrián Menéndez Maceiras (France) Arthur Cazaux (Canada) Steven Diez (Chile) Nicolás Jarry
April 18	San Marcos Open Aguascalientes; Aguascalientes, Mexico; Clay – Challenger 80 – 32S/24Q/16D; Singles – Doubles	(Colombia) Nicolás Barrientos (Mexico) Miguel Ángel Reyes-Varela; 7–5, 6–3	(Portugal) Gonçalo Oliveira (India) Divij Sharan	(Romania) Filip Cristian Jianu (Italy) Federico Gaio	(Spain) Adrián Menéndez Maceiras (France) Arthur Cazaux (Canada) Steven Diez (Chile) Nicolás Jarry
April 25	Ostra Group Open; Ostrava, Czech Republic; Clay – Challenger 80 – 32S/24Q/16D; Singles – Doubles	(France) Evan Furness; 4–6, 7–6^{(8–6)}, 6–1	(United Kingdom) Ryan Peniston	(Czech Republic) Dalibor Svrčina (France) Constant Lestienne	(Czech Republic) Jonáš Forejtek (Germany) Mats Rosenkranz (Czech Republic) Zdeněk Kolář (Ukraine) Vitaliy Sachko
April 25	Ostra Group Open; Ostrava, Czech Republic; Clay – Challenger 80 – 32S/24Q/16D; Singles – Doubles	(Austria) Alexander Erler (Austria) Lucas Miedler; 7–6^{(7–5)}, 7–5	(United States) Hunter Reese (Netherlands) Sem Verbeek	(Czech Republic) Dalibor Svrčina (France) Constant Lestienne	(Czech Republic) Jonáš Forejtek (Germany) Mats Rosenkranz (Czech Republic) Zdeněk Kolář (Ukraine) Vitaliy Sachko
April 25	Garden Open; Rome, Italy; Clay – Challenger 80 – 32S/24Q/16D; Singles – Doubles	(Italy) Franco Agamenone; 6–1, 6–4	(Italy) Gian Marco Moroni	(France) Quentin Halys (Italy) Flavio Cobolli	(Netherlands) Jesper de Jong (Turkey) Ergi Kırkın (France) Kenny de Schepper (Italy) Giulio Zeppieri
April 25	Garden Open; Rome, Italy; Clay – Challenger 80 – 32S/24Q/16D; Singles – Doubles	(Netherlands) Jesper de Jong (Netherlands) Bart Stevens; 3–6, 7–5, [10–8]	(France) Sadio Doumbia (France) Fabien Reboul	(France) Quentin Halys (Italy) Flavio Cobolli	(Netherlands) Jesper de Jong (Turkey) Ergi Kırkın (France) Kenny de Schepper (Italy) Giulio Zeppieri
April 25	Savannah Challenger; Savannah, United States; Clay – Challenger 80 – 32S/24Q/16D; Singles – Doubles	(United States) Jack Sock; 6–4, 6–1	(United States) Christian Harrison	(United States) J. J. Wolf (United States) Bjorn Fratangelo	(Argentina) Tomás Martín Etcheverry (United States) Alex Rybakov (China) Zhang Zhizhen (Brazil) José Pereira
April 25	Savannah Challenger; Savannah, United States; Clay – Challenger 80 – 32S/24Q/16D; Singles – Doubles	(Philippines) Ruben Gonzales (Philippines) Treat Huey; 7–6^{(7–3)}, 6–4	(Chinese Taipei) Wu Tung-lin (China) Zhang Zhizhen	(United States) J. J. Wolf (United States) Bjorn Fratangelo	(Argentina) Tomás Martín Etcheverry (United States) Alex Rybakov (China) Zhang Zhizhen (Brazil) José Pereira
April 25	Challenger de Tigre II; Tigre, Argentina; Clay – Challenger 80 – 32S/24Q/16D; Singles – Doubles	(Argentina) Camilo Ugo Carabelli; 7–5, 6–2	(Argentina) Andrea Collarini	(Argentina) Genaro Alberto Olivieri (Peru) Juan Pablo Varillas	(Argentina) Santiago Rodríguez Taverna (Brazil) Felipe Meligeni Alves (Argentina) Gonzalo Villanueva (Argentina) Francisco Comesaña
April 25	Challenger de Tigre II; Tigre, Argentina; Clay – Challenger 80 – 32S/24Q/16D; Singles – Doubles	(Argentina) Guillermo Durán (Brazil) Felipe Meligeni Alves; 3–6, 6–4, [10–3]	(Italy) Luciano Darderi (Argentina) Juan Bautista Torres	(Argentina) Genaro Alberto Olivieri (Peru) Juan Pablo Varillas	(Argentina) Santiago Rodríguez Taverna (Brazil) Felipe Meligeni Alves (Argentina) Gonzalo Villanueva (Argentina) Francisco Comesaña
April 25	Morelos Open; Cuernavaca, Mexico; Hard – Challenger 80 – 32S/24Q/16D; Singles – Doubles	(United Kingdom) Jay Clarke; 6–1, 4–6, 7–6^{(7–5)}	(Spain) Adrián Menéndez Maceiras	(South Korea) Chung Yun-seong (Australia) Rinky Hijikata	(United States) Ernesto Escobedo (United States) Keegan Smith (Ecuador) Roberto Quiroz (Canada) Steven Diez
April 25	Morelos Open; Cuernavaca, Mexico; Hard – Challenger 80 – 32S/24Q/16D; Singles – Doubles	(United States) JC Aragone (Spain) Adrián Menéndez Maceiras; 7–6^{(7–4)}, 6–2	(Colombia) Nicolás Mejía (Ecuador) Roberto Quiroz	(South Korea) Chung Yun-seong (Australia) Rinky Hijikata	(United States) Ernesto Escobedo (United States) Keegan Smith (Ecuador) Roberto Quiroz (Canada) Steven Diez

=== May ===
Week of	Tournament	Champions	Runners-up	Semifinalists	Quarterfinalists
May 2	Open du Pays d'Aix; Aix-en-Provence, France; Clay – Challenger 100 – 32S/24Q/16D; Singles – Doubles	(France) Benjamin Bonzi; 6–2, 6–4	(France) Grégoire Barrère	(Chile) Nicolás Jarry; Pavel Kotov	(India) Ramkumar Ramanathan (France) Alexandre Müller (France) Quentin Halys (France) Hugo Grenier
May 2	Open du Pays d'Aix; Aix-en-Provence, France; Clay – Challenger 100 – 32S/24Q/16D; Singles – Doubles	(France) Titouan Droguet (France) Kyrian Jacquet; 6–2, 6–3	(Colombia) Nicolás Barrientos (Mexico) Miguel Ángel Reyes-Varela	(Chile) Nicolás Jarry; Pavel Kotov	(India) Ramkumar Ramanathan (France) Alexandre Müller (France) Quentin Halys (France) Hugo Grenier
May 2	Upper Austria Open; Mauthausen, Austria; Clay – Challenger 100 – 32S/24Q/16D; Singles – Doubles	(Austria) Jurij Rodionov; 6–4, 6–4	(Czech Republic) Jiří Lehečka	(Hungary) Máté Valkusz (Austria) Dennis Novak	(Australia) John Millman (Hungary) Attila Balázs (Austria) Lucas Miedler (Moldova) Radu Albot
May 2	Upper Austria Open; Mauthausen, Austria; Clay – Challenger 100 – 32S/24Q/16D; Singles – Doubles	(Netherlands) Sander Arends (Netherlands) David Pel; 6–4, 6–3	(Germany) Johannes Härteis (Lebanon) Benjamin Hassan	(Hungary) Máté Valkusz (Austria) Dennis Novak	(Australia) John Millman (Hungary) Attila Balázs (Austria) Lucas Miedler (Moldova) Radu Albot
May 2	I.ČLTK Prague Open; Prague, Czech Republic; Clay – Challenger 80 – 32S/24Q/16D; Singles – Doubles	(Argentina) Pedro Cachin; 6–3, 7–6^{(7–4)}	(Italy) Lorenzo Giustino	(France) Geoffrey Blancaneaux (Bulgaria) Dimitar Kuzmanov	(Italy) Thomas Fabbiano (France) Clément Tabur (Italy) Federico Gaio (Germany) Maximilian Marterer
May 2	I.ČLTK Prague Open; Prague, Czech Republic; Clay – Challenger 80 – 32S/24Q/16D; Singles – Doubles	(Portugal) Nuno Borges (Portugal) Francisco Cabral; 6–4, 6–7^{(3–7)}, [10–5]	(Czech Republic) Andrew Paulson (Czech Republic) Adam Pavlásek	(France) Geoffrey Blancaneaux (Bulgaria) Dimitar Kuzmanov	(Italy) Thomas Fabbiano (France) Clément Tabur (Italy) Federico Gaio (Germany) Maximilian Marterer
May 2	Salvador Challenger; Salvador, Brazil; Clay – Challenger 80 – 32S/24Q/16D; Singles – Doubles	(Portugal) João Domingues; 7–6^{(11–9)}, 6–1	(Chile) Tomás Barrios Vera	(Argentina) Gonzalo Villanueva (Argentina) Renzo Olivo	(Chile) Gonzalo Lama (Brazil) Daniel Dutra da Silva (Brazil) Wilson Leite (Brazil) Pedro Boscardin Dias
May 2	Salvador Challenger; Salvador, Brazil; Clay – Challenger 80 – 32S/24Q/16D; Singles – Doubles	(Ecuador) Diego Hidalgo (Colombia) Cristian Rodríguez; 7–5, 6–1	(Brazil) Orlando Luz (Brazil) Felipe Meligeni Alves	(Argentina) Gonzalo Villanueva (Argentina) Renzo Olivo	(Chile) Gonzalo Lama (Brazil) Daniel Dutra da Silva (Brazil) Wilson Leite (Brazil) Pedro Boscardin Dias
May 9	BNP Paribas Primrose Bordeaux; Bordeaux, France; Clay – Challenger 125 – 32S/24Q/16D; Singles – Doubles	(Australia) Alexei Popyrin; 2–6, 7–6^{(7–5)}, 7–6^{(7–4)}	(France) Quentin Halys	Pavel Kotov (Italy) Andrea Pellegrino	(Uruguay) Pablo Cuevas (Sweden) Elias Ymer (Spain) Jaume Munar (France) Benjamin Bonzi
May 9	BNP Paribas Primrose Bordeaux; Bordeaux, France; Clay – Challenger 125 – 32S/24Q/16D; Singles – Doubles	(Brazil) Rafael Matos (Spain) David Vega Hernández; 6–4, 6–0	(Monaco) Hugo Nys (Poland) Jan Zieliński	Pavel Kotov (Italy) Andrea Pellegrino	(Uruguay) Pablo Cuevas (Sweden) Elias Ymer (Spain) Jaume Munar (France) Benjamin Bonzi
May 9	Heilbronner Neckarcup; Heilbronn, Germany; Clay – Challenger 100 – 32S/24Q/16D; Singles – Doubles	(Germany) Daniel Altmaier; 3–6, 6–1, 6–4	(Slovakia) Andrej Martin	(Colombia) Daniel Elahi Galán (Czech Republic) Jonáš Forejtek	(Argentina) Thiago Agustín Tirante (Chinese Taipei) Tseng Chun-hsin (Spain) Bernabé Zapata Miralles (Switzerland) Alexander Ritschard
May 9	Heilbronner Neckarcup; Heilbronn, Germany; Clay – Challenger 100 – 32S/24Q/16D; Singles – Doubles	(Colombia) Nicolás Barrientos (Mexico) Miguel Ángel Reyes-Varela; 7–5, 6–3	(Netherlands) Jelle Sels (Netherlands) Bart Stevens	(Colombia) Daniel Elahi Galán (Czech Republic) Jonáš Forejtek	(Argentina) Thiago Agustín Tirante (Chinese Taipei) Tseng Chun-hsin (Spain) Bernabé Zapata Miralles (Switzerland) Alexander Ritschard
May 9	Zagreb Open; Zagreb, Croatia; Clay – Challenger 80 – 32S/24Q/16D; Singles – Doubles	(Austria) Filip Misolic; 6–3, 7–6^{(8–6)}	(Croatia) Mili Poljičak	(Australia) Jason Kubler (Spain) Carlos Gimeno Valero	(China) Wu Yibing (Croatia) Duje Ajduković (Croatia) Nino Serdarušić (Bosnia and Herzegovina) Mirza Bašić
May 9	Zagreb Open; Zagreb, Croatia; Clay – Challenger 80 – 32S/24Q/16D; Singles – Doubles	(Czech Republic) Adam Pavlásek (Slovakia) Igor Zelenay; 4–6, 6–3, [10–2]	(Croatia) Domagoj Bilješko; Andrey Chepelev	(Australia) Jason Kubler (Spain) Carlos Gimeno Valero	(China) Wu Yibing (Croatia) Duje Ajduković (Croatia) Nino Serdarušić (Bosnia and Herzegovina) Mirza Bašić
May 9	Shymkent Challenger; Shymkent, Kazakhstan; Clay – Challenger 80 – 32S/24Q/16D; Singles – Doubles	(United States) Emilio Nava; 6–4, 7–6^{(7–3)}	(Germany) Sebastian Fanselow	(United States) Ulises Blanch (Turkey) Ergi Kırkın	(Norway) Viktor Durasovic (Bulgaria) Alexandar Lazarov; Evgeny Karlovskiy (Sweden) Dragoș Nicolae Mădăraș
May 9	Shymkent Challenger; Shymkent, Kazakhstan; Clay – Challenger 80 – 32S/24Q/16D; Singles – Doubles	(Switzerland) Antoine Bellier (Brazil) Gabriel Décamps; 7–6^{(7–3)}, 6–3	(Germany) Sebastian Fanselow (Japan) Kaichi Uchida	(United States) Ulises Blanch (Turkey) Ergi Kırkın	(Norway) Viktor Durasovic (Bulgaria) Alexandar Lazarov; Evgeny Karlovskiy (Sweden) Dragoș Nicolae Mădăraș
May 9	Challenger Coquimbo; Coquimbo, Chile; Clay – Challenger 80 – 32S/24Q/16D; Singles – Doubles	(Argentina) Facundo Díaz Acosta; 7–5, 7–6^{(7–4)}	(Brazil) Pedro Boscardin Dias	(Argentina) Francisco Comesaña (Argentina) Juan Bautista Torres	(Chile) Tomás Barrios Vera (Spain) Pol Martín Tiffon (Argentina) Andrea Collarini (Peru) Arklon Huertas del Pino
May 9	Challenger Coquimbo; Coquimbo, Chile; Clay – Challenger 80 – 32S/24Q/16D; Singles – Doubles	(Argentina) Guillermo Durán (Colombia) Nicolás Mejía; 6–4, 1–6, [10–7]	(Ecuador) Diego Hidalgo (Colombia) Cristian Rodríguez	(Argentina) Francisco Comesaña (Argentina) Juan Bautista Torres	(Chile) Tomás Barrios Vera (Spain) Pol Martín Tiffon (Argentina) Andrea Collarini (Peru) Arklon Huertas del Pino
May 16	Tunis Open; Tunis, Tunisia; Clay – Challenger 80 – 32S/24Q/16D; Singles – Doubles	(Spain) Roberto Carballés Baena; 6–1, 6–1	(Netherlands) Gijs Brouwer	(Austria) Filip Misolic (China) Zhang Zhizhen	(Germany) Nicola Kuhn (Spain) Oriol Roca Batalla (Portugal) Frederico Ferreira Silva (Belgium) Michael Geerts
May 16	Tunis Open; Tunis, Tunisia; Clay – Challenger 80 – 32S/24Q/16D; Singles – Doubles	(Colombia) Nicolás Barrientos (Mexico) Miguel Ángel Reyes-Varela; 6–7^{(3–7)}, 6–3, [11–9]	(Austria) Alexander Erler (Austria) Lucas Miedler	(Austria) Filip Misolic (China) Zhang Zhizhen	(Germany) Nicola Kuhn (Spain) Oriol Roca Batalla (Portugal) Frederico Ferreira Silva (Belgium) Michael Geerts
May 16	Shymkent Challenger II; Shymkent, Kazakhstan; Clay – Challenger 80 – 32S/24Q/16D; Singles – Doubles	(Uzbekistan) Sergey Fomin; 7–6^{(7–4)}, 6–3	(Netherlands) Robin Haase	(United States) Emilio Nava (United States) Evan Zhu	Evgeny Karlovskiy (Japan) Kaichi Uchida (Romania) Nicholas David Ionel (Ukraine) Illya Marchenko
May 16	Shymkent Challenger II; Shymkent, Kazakhstan; Clay – Challenger 80 – 32S/24Q/16D; Singles – Doubles	(Uzbekistan) Sanjar Fayziev (Greece) Markos Kalovelonis; 6–7^{(3–7)}, 6–4, [10–4]	(Denmark) Mikael Torpegaard (Japan) Kaichi Uchida	(United States) Emilio Nava (United States) Evan Zhu	Evgeny Karlovskiy (Japan) Kaichi Uchida (Romania) Nicholas David Ionel (Ukraine) Illya Marchenko
May 16	Internazionali di Tennis d'Abruzzo; Francavilla al Mare, Italy; Clay – Challenger 50 – 32S/24Q/16D; Singles – Doubles	(Italy) Matteo Arnaldi; 6–3, 6–7^{(7–9)}, 6–4	(Italy) Francesco Maestrelli	(Canada) Alexis Galarneau (Argentina) Hernán Casanova	(France) Mathias Bourgue (United States) Alex Rybakov (France) Dan Added (Hungary) Máté Valkusz
May 16	Internazionali di Tennis d'Abruzzo; Francavilla al Mare, Italy; Clay – Challenger 50 – 32S/24Q/16D; Singles – Doubles	(France) Dan Added (Argentina) Hernán Casanova; 6–3, 7–5	(Italy) Davide Pozzi (Italy) Augusto Virgili	(Canada) Alexis Galarneau (Argentina) Hernán Casanova	(France) Mathias Bourgue (United States) Alex Rybakov (France) Dan Added (Hungary) Máté Valkusz
May 23	Internazionali di Tennis Città di Vicenza; Vicenza, Italy; Clay – Challenger 80 – 32S/24Q/16D; Singles – Doubles	(Italy) Andrea Pellegrino; 6–1, 6–4	(Argentina) Andrea Collarini	(Italy) Matteo Gigante (Brazil) Daniel Dutra da Silva	(Italy) Gianluca Mager (Italy) Andrea Arnaboldi (Italy) Matteo Arnaldi (Argentina) Juan Manuel Cerúndolo
May 23	Internazionali di Tennis Città di Vicenza; Vicenza, Italy; Clay – Challenger 80 – 32S/24Q/16D; Singles – Doubles	(Argentina) Francisco Comesaña (Italy) Luciano Darderi; 6–3, 7–6^{(7–4)}	(Italy) Matteo Gigante (Italy) Francesco Passaro	(Italy) Matteo Gigante (Brazil) Daniel Dutra da Silva	(Italy) Gianluca Mager (Italy) Andrea Arnaboldi (Italy) Matteo Arnaldi (Argentina) Juan Manuel Cerúndolo
May 23	Saturn Oil Open; Troisdorf, Germany; Clay – Challenger 80 – 32S/24Q/16D; Singles – Doubles	(Slovakia) Lukáš Klein; 6–2, 6–4	(Belgium) Zizou Bergs	(Germany) Henri Squire; Roman Safiullin	Evgeny Donskoy (France) Hugo Grenier (Portugal) Frederico Ferreira Silva (Netherlands) Jelle Sels
May 23	Saturn Oil Open; Troisdorf, Germany; Clay – Challenger 80 – 32S/24Q/16D; Singles – Doubles	(Jamaica) Dustin Brown (United States) Evan King; 6–4, 7–5	(Germany) Hendrik Jebens (Poland) Piotr Matuszewski	(Germany) Henri Squire; Roman Safiullin	Evgeny Donskoy (France) Hugo Grenier (Portugal) Frederico Ferreira Silva (Netherlands) Jelle Sels
May 30	Forlì Open; Forlì, Italy; Clay – Challenger 125 – 32S/24Q/16D; Singles – Doubles	(Italy) Lorenzo Musetti; 2–6, 6–3, 6–2	(Italy) Francesco Passaro	(Italy) Matteo Gigante (Spain) Jaume Munar	(Argentina) Juan Manuel Cerúndolo (Argentina) Tomás Martín Etcheverry (Italy) Riccardo Bonadio (Japan) Taro Daniel
May 30	Forlì Open; Forlì, Italy; Clay – Challenger 125 – 32S/24Q/16D; Singles – Doubles	(Colombia) Nicolás Barrientos (Mexico) Miguel Ángel Reyes-Varela; 7–5, 4–6, [10–4]	(France) Sadio Doumbia (France) Fabien Reboul	(Italy) Matteo Gigante (Spain) Jaume Munar	(Argentina) Juan Manuel Cerúndolo (Argentina) Tomás Martín Etcheverry (Italy) Riccardo Bonadio (Japan) Taro Daniel
May 30	Surbiton Trophy; Surbiton, United Kingdom; Grass – Challenger 125 – 32S/24Q/16D; Singles – Doubles	(Australia) Jordan Thompson; 7–5, 6–3	(United States) Denis Kudla	(United Kingdom) Andy Murray (Finland) Otto Virtanen	(United States) Brandon Nakashima (Australia) Max Purcell (Australia) Christopher O'Connell (United Kingdom) Ryan Peniston
May 30	Surbiton Trophy; Surbiton, United Kingdom; Grass – Challenger 125 – 32S/24Q/16D; Singles – Doubles	(United Kingdom) Julian Cash (United Kingdom) Henry Patten; 4–6, 6–3, [11–9]	(Kazakhstan) Aleksandr Nedovyesov (Pakistan) Aisam-ul-Haq Qureshi	(United Kingdom) Andy Murray (Finland) Otto Virtanen	(United States) Brandon Nakashima (Australia) Max Purcell (Australia) Christopher O'Connell (United Kingdom) Ryan Peniston
May 30	UniCredit Czech Open; Prostějov, Czech Republic; Clay – Challenger 100 – 32S/24Q/16D; Singles – Doubles	(Czech Republic) Vít Kopřiva; 6–2, 6–2	(Czech Republic) Dalibor Svrčina	(Slovakia) Lukáš Klein (Slovakia) Filip Horanský	(Serbia) Hamad Međedović (Lebanon) Benjamin Hassan (Brazil) Matheus Pucinelli de Almeida (Czech Republic) Martin Krumich
May 30	UniCredit Czech Open; Prostějov, Czech Republic; Clay – Challenger 100 – 32S/24Q/16D; Singles – Doubles	(India) Yuki Bhambri (India) Saketh Myneni; 6–3, 7–5	(Czech Republic) Roman Jebavý (Slovakia) Andrej Martin	(Slovakia) Lukáš Klein (Slovakia) Filip Horanský	(Serbia) Hamad Međedović (Lebanon) Benjamin Hassan (Brazil) Matheus Pucinelli de Almeida (Czech Republic) Martin Krumich
May 30	Little Rock Challenger; Little Rock, United States; Hard – Challenger 100 – 32S/24Q/16D; Singles – Doubles	(Australia) Jason Kubler; 6–0, 6–2	(Chinese Taipei) Wu Tung-lin	(United States) Aleksandar Kovacevic (United States) Ben Shelton	(United States) Murphy Cassone (Japan) Yasutaka Uchiyama (United States) Brandon Holt (Argentina) Román Andrés Burruchaga
May 30	Little Rock Challenger; Little Rock, United States; Hard – Challenger 100 – 32S/24Q/16D; Singles – Doubles	(Australia) Andrew Harris (United States) Christian Harrison; 6–3, 6–4	(United States) Robert Galloway (United States) Max Schnur	(United States) Aleksandar Kovacevic (United States) Ben Shelton	(United States) Murphy Cassone (Japan) Yasutaka Uchiyama (United States) Brandon Holt (Argentina) Román Andrés Burruchaga
May 30	Poznań Open; Poznań, Poland; Clay – Challenger 90 – 32S/24Q/16D; Singles – Doubles	(France) Arthur Rinderknech; 6–3, 7–6^{(7–2)}	(Chile) Tomás Barrios Vera	(Bulgaria) Dimitar Kuzmanov (Argentina) Genaro Alberto Olivieri	(Brazil) Daniel Dutra da Silva (Chinese Taipei) Tseng Chun-hsin (Belgium) Zizou Bergs; Alexander Shevchenko
May 30	Poznań Open; Poznań, Poland; Clay – Challenger 90 – 32S/24Q/16D; Singles – Doubles	(United States) Hunter Reese (Poland) Szymon Walków; 1–6, 6–3, [10–6]	(Czech Republic) Marek Gengel (Czech Republic) Adam Pavlásek	(Bulgaria) Dimitar Kuzmanov (Argentina) Genaro Alberto Olivieri	(Brazil) Daniel Dutra da Silva (Chinese Taipei) Tseng Chun-hsin (Belgium) Zizou Bergs; Alexander Shevchenko

=== June ===
Week of	Tournament	Champions	Runners-up	Semifinalists	Quarterfinalists
June 6	Nottingham Open; Nottingham, United Kingdom; Grass – Challenger 125 – 32S/24Q/16D; Singles – Doubles	(United Kingdom) Dan Evans; 6–4, 6–4	(Australia) Jordan Thompson	(United States) Jack Sock (Australia) Alexei Popyrin	(Switzerland) Marc-Andrea Hüsler (United Kingdom) Liam Broady (Kazakhstan) Mikhail Kukushkin (United Kingdom) Ryan Peniston
June 6	Nottingham Open; Nottingham, United Kingdom; Grass – Challenger 125 – 32S/24Q/16D; Singles – Doubles	(United Kingdom) Jonny O'Mara (United Kingdom) Ken Skupski; 3–6, 6–2, [16–14]	(United Kingdom) Julian Cash (United Kingdom) Henry Patten	(United States) Jack Sock (Australia) Alexei Popyrin	(Switzerland) Marc-Andrea Hüsler (United Kingdom) Liam Broady (Kazakhstan) Mikhail Kukushkin (United Kingdom) Ryan Peniston
June 6	Internazionali di Tennis Città di Perugia; Perugia, Italy; Clay – Challenger 125 – 32S/24Q/16D; Singles – Doubles	(Spain) Jaume Munar; 6–3, 4–6, 6–1	(Argentina) Tomás Martín Etcheverry	(Germany) Maximilian Marterer (Italy) Luciano Darderi	(Italy) Giulio Zeppieri (Croatia) Borna Ćorić (Italy) Luca Potenza (Brazil) Thiago Monteiro
June 6	Internazionali di Tennis Città di Perugia; Perugia, Italy; Clay – Challenger 125 – 32S/24Q/16D; Singles – Doubles	(France) Sadio Doumbia (France) Fabien Reboul; 6–2, 6–4	(Italy) Marco Bortolotti (Spain) Sergio Martos Gornés	(Germany) Maximilian Marterer (Italy) Luciano Darderi	(Italy) Giulio Zeppieri (Croatia) Borna Ćorić (Italy) Luca Potenza (Brazil) Thiago Monteiro
June 6	Open Sopra Steria de Lyon; Lyon, France; Clay – Challenger 100 – 32S/24Q/16D; Singles – Doubles	(France) Corentin Moutet; 6–4, 6–4	(Argentina) Pedro Cachin	(France) Manuel Guinard (France) Richard Gasquet	(Argentina) Federico Coria (France) Hugo Grenier (France) Alexandre Müller; Alexey Vatutin
June 6	Open Sopra Steria de Lyon; Lyon, France; Clay – Challenger 100 – 32S/24Q/16D; Singles – Doubles	(Monaco) Romain Arneodo (France) Jonathan Eysseric; 7–5, 4–6, [10–4]	(Netherlands) Sander Arends (Netherlands) David Pel	(France) Manuel Guinard (France) Richard Gasquet	(Argentina) Federico Coria (France) Hugo Grenier (France) Alexandre Müller; Alexey Vatutin
June 6	Orlando Open; Orlando, United States; Hard – Challenger 100 – 32S/24Q/16D; Singles – Doubles	(China) Wu Yibing; 6–7^{(5–7)}, 6–4, 3–1 ret.	(Australia) Jason Kubler	(United States) J. J. Wolf (Ecuador) Emilio Gómez	(Chinese Taipei) Wu Tung-lin (United States) Ulises Blanch (United States) Christopher Eubanks (Ecuador) Roberto Quiroz
June 6	Orlando Open; Orlando, United States; Hard – Challenger 100 – 32S/24Q/16D; Singles – Doubles	(South Korea) Chung Yun-seong (Greece) Michail Pervolarakis; 6–7^{(5–7)}, 7–6^{(7–3)}, [16–14]	(Tunisia) Malek Jaziri (Japan) Kaichi Uchida	(United States) J. J. Wolf (Ecuador) Emilio Gómez	(Chinese Taipei) Wu Tung-lin (United States) Ulises Blanch (United States) Christopher Eubanks (Ecuador) Roberto Quiroz
June 6	Bratislava Open; Bratislava, Slovakia; Clay – Challenger 90 – 32S/24Q/16D; Singles – Doubles	Alexander Shevchenko; 6–3, 7–5	(Italy) Riccardo Bonadio	(Slovakia) Norbert Gombos (Chinese Taipei) Tseng Chun-hsin	Andrey Kuznetsov (Slovakia) Jozef Kovalík (Ukraine) Oleksii Krutykh (Czech Republic) Vít Kopřiva
June 6	Bratislava Open; Bratislava, Slovakia; Clay – Challenger 90 – 32S/24Q/16D; Singles – Doubles	(India) Sriram Balaji (India) Jeevan Nedunchezhiyan; 7–6^{(8–6)}, 6–4	(Ukraine) Vladyslav Manafov (Ukraine) Oleg Prihodko	(Slovakia) Norbert Gombos (Chinese Taipei) Tseng Chun-hsin	Andrey Kuznetsov (Slovakia) Jozef Kovalík (Ukraine) Oleksii Krutykh (Czech Republic) Vít Kopřiva
June 13	Ilkley Trophy; Ilkley, United Kingdom; Grass – Challenger 125 – 32S/24Q/16D; Singles – Doubles	(Belgium) Zizou Bergs; 7–6^{(9–7)}, 2–6, 7–6^{(8–6)}	(United States) Jack Sock	(Australia) Alexei Popyrin (France) Constant Lestienne	(Italy) Andreas Seppi (Netherlands) Gijs Brouwer (France) Pierre-Hugues Herbert (Czech Republic) Jiří Veselý
June 13	Ilkley Trophy; Ilkley, United Kingdom; Grass – Challenger 125 – 32S/24Q/16D; Singles – Doubles	(United Kingdom) Julian Cash (United Kingdom) Henry Patten; 7–5, 6–4	(India) Ramkumar Ramanathan (Australia) John-Patrick Smith	(Australia) Alexei Popyrin (France) Constant Lestienne	(Italy) Andreas Seppi (Netherlands) Gijs Brouwer (France) Pierre-Hugues Herbert (Czech Republic) Jiří Veselý
June 13	Emilia-Romagna Open; Parma, Italy; Clay – Challenger 125 – 32S/24Q/16D; Singles – Doubles	(Croatia) Borna Ćorić; 7–6^{(7–4)}, 6–0	(Sweden) Elias Ymer	(Italy) Marco Cecchinato (Serbia) Dušan Lajović	(Italy) Andrea Arnaboldi (Chinese Taipei) Tseng Chun-hsin (Italy) Giulio Zeppieri (Slovakia) Jozef Kovalík
June 13	Emilia-Romagna Open; Parma, Italy; Clay – Challenger 125 – 32S/24Q/16D; Singles – Doubles	(Italy) Luciano Darderi (Brazil) Fernando Romboli; 6–2, 6–3	(Ukraine) Denys Molchanov (Slovakia) Igor Zelenay	(Italy) Marco Cecchinato (Serbia) Dušan Lajović	(Italy) Andrea Arnaboldi (Chinese Taipei) Tseng Chun-hsin (Italy) Giulio Zeppieri (Slovakia) Jozef Kovalík
June 13	Internationaux de Tennis de Blois; Blois, France; Clay – Challenger 80 – 32S/24Q/16D; Singles – Doubles	(France) Alexandre Müller; 7–6^{(7–3)}, 6–1	(Serbia) Nikola Milojević	(Czech Republic) Vít Kopřiva (France) Luca Van Assche	Evgeny Karlovskiy (Germany) Maximilian Marterer (Argentina) Genaro Alberto Olivieri (Spain) Nikolás Sánchez Izquierdo
June 13	Internationaux de Tennis de Blois; Blois, France; Clay – Challenger 80 – 32S/24Q/16D; Singles – Doubles	(India) Sriram Balaji (India) Jeevan Nedunchezhiyan; 6–4, 6–7^{(3–7)}, [10–7]	(Monaco) Romain Arneodo (France) Jonathan Eysseric	(Czech Republic) Vít Kopřiva (France) Luca Van Assche	Evgeny Karlovskiy (Germany) Maximilian Marterer (Argentina) Genaro Alberto Olivieri (Spain) Nikolás Sánchez Izquierdo
June 13	Corrientes Challenger; Corrientes, Argentina; Clay – Challenger 50 – 32S/24Q/16D; Singles – Doubles	(Argentina) Francisco Comesaña; 6–0, 6–3	(Argentina) Mariano Navone	(Argentina) Juan Pablo Ficovich (Argentina) Román Andrés Burruchaga	(Dominican Republic) Nick Hardt (Spain) Carlos Gómez-Herrera (Argentina) Alejo Lorenzo Lingua Lavallén (Brazil) João Lucas Reis da Silva
June 13	Corrientes Challenger; Corrientes, Argentina; Clay – Challenger 50 – 32S/24Q/16D; Singles – Doubles	(Argentina) Guido Andreozzi (Argentina) Guillermo Durán; 7–5, 6–2	(Peru) Nicolás Álvarez (Bolivia) Murkel Dellien	(Argentina) Juan Pablo Ficovich (Argentina) Román Andrés Burruchaga	(Dominican Republic) Nick Hardt (Spain) Carlos Gómez-Herrera (Argentina) Alejo Lorenzo Lingua Lavallén (Brazil) João Lucas Reis da Silva
June 20	Aspria Tennis Cup; Milan, Italy; Clay – Challenger 80 – 32S/24Q/16D; Singles – Doubles	(Argentina) Federico Coria; 7–6^{(7–2)}, 6–4	(Italy) Francesco Passaro	Alexander Shevchenko (Hungary) Fábián Marozsán	(Italy) Luciano Darderi (Japan) Shintaro Mochizuki (Norway) Viktor Durasovic (Italy) Matteo Gigante
June 20	Aspria Tennis Cup; Milan, Italy; Clay – Challenger 80 – 32S/24Q/16D; Singles – Doubles	(Italy) Luciano Darderi (Brazil) Fernando Romboli; 6–4, 2–6, [10–5]	(Ecuador) Diego Hidalgo (Colombia) Cristian Rodríguez	Alexander Shevchenko (Hungary) Fábián Marozsán	(Italy) Luciano Darderi (Japan) Shintaro Mochizuki (Norway) Viktor Durasovic (Italy) Matteo Gigante
June 20	Open de Oeiras III; Oeiras, Portugal; Clay – Challenger 80 – 32S/24Q/16D; Singles – Doubles	(Japan) Kaichi Uchida; 6–2, 6–4	(Belgium) Kimmer Coppejans	(Chile) Nicolás Jarry (Argentina) Facundo Bagnis	(Poland) Daniel Michalski (France) Kyrian Jacquet (Belgium) Michael Geerts (United States) Alex Rybakov
June 20	Open de Oeiras III; Oeiras, Portugal; Clay – Challenger 80 – 32S/24Q/16D; Singles – Doubles	(France) Sadio Doumbia (France) Fabien Reboul; 6–3, 3–6, [15–13]	(United States) Robert Galloway (United States) Alex Lawson	(Chile) Nicolás Jarry (Argentina) Facundo Bagnis	(Poland) Daniel Michalski (France) Kyrian Jacquet (Belgium) Michael Geerts (United States) Alex Rybakov
June 20	Challenger Tenis Club Argentino; Buenos Aires, Argentina; Clay – Challenger 50 – 32S/24Q/16D; Singles – Doubles	(Argentina) Francisco Comesaña; 6–4, 6–0	(Argentina) Mariano Navone	(Tunisia) Malek Jaziri (Brazil) Felipe Meligeni Alves	(Argentina) Juan Pablo Ficovich (Argentina) Gonzalo Villanueva (Peru) Arklon Huertas del Pino (Brazil) João Lucas Reis da Silva
June 20	Challenger Tenis Club Argentino; Buenos Aires, Argentina; Clay – Challenger 50 – 32S/24Q/16D; Singles – Doubles	(Peru) Arklon Huertas del Pino (Peru) Conner Huertas del Pino; 7–5, 4–6, [11–9]	(Argentina) Matías Franco Descotte (Argentina) Alejo Lorenzo Lingua Lavallén	(Tunisia) Malek Jaziri (Brazil) Felipe Meligeni Alves	(Argentina) Juan Pablo Ficovich (Argentina) Gonzalo Villanueva (Peru) Arklon Huertas del Pino (Brazil) João Lucas Reis da Silva
June 27	Platzmann-Sauerland Open; Lüdenscheid, Germany; Clay – Challenger 80 – 32S/24Q/16D; Singles – Doubles	(Serbia) Hamad Međedović; 6–1, 6–2	(China) Zhang Zhizhen	(Chile) Nicolás Jarry (Slovakia) Jozef Kovalík	(Argentina) Santiago Rodríguez Taverna (Italy) Marco Cecchinato (Uruguay) Pablo Cuevas (Netherlands) Robin Haase
June 27	Platzmann-Sauerland Open; Lüdenscheid, Germany; Clay – Challenger 80 – 32S/24Q/16D; Singles – Doubles	(Netherlands) Robin Haase (Netherlands) Sem Verbeek; 6–2, 5–7, [10–3]	(Germany) Fabian Fallert (Germany) Hendrik Jebens	(Chile) Nicolás Jarry (Slovakia) Jozef Kovalík	(Argentina) Santiago Rodríguez Taverna (Italy) Marco Cecchinato (Uruguay) Pablo Cuevas (Netherlands) Robin Haase
June 27	Málaga Open; Málaga, Spain; Hard – Challenger 80 – 32S/24Q/16D; Singles – Doubles	(France) Constant Lestienne; 6–3, 5–7, 6–2	(Ecuador) Emilio Gómez	(United States) Michael Mmoh (Turkey) Altuğ Çelikbilek	(Germany) Daniel Masur (Canada) Steven Diez (Australia) James McCabe (Spain) Alberto Barroso Campos
June 27	Málaga Open; Málaga, Spain; Hard – Challenger 80 – 32S/24Q/16D; Singles – Doubles	(Turkey) Altuğ Çelikbilek (Kazakhstan) Dmitry Popko; 6–7^{(4–7)}, 6–4, [10–6]	(Israel) Daniel Cukierman (Ecuador) Emilio Gómez	(United States) Michael Mmoh (Turkey) Altuğ Çelikbilek	(Germany) Daniel Masur (Canada) Steven Diez (Australia) James McCabe (Spain) Alberto Barroso Campos
June 27	Cali Open; Cali, Colombia; Clay – Challenger 80 – 32S/24Q/16D; Singles – Doubles	(Argentina) Facundo Mena; 6–2, 7–6^{(7–3)}	(Serbia) Miljan Zekić	(Colombia) Nicolás Mejía (Peru) Nicolás Álvarez	(Argentina) Román Andrés Burruchaga (Argentina) Matías Zukas (Brazil) Felipe Meligeni Alves (South Korea) Chung Yun-seong
June 27	Cali Open; Cali, Colombia; Clay – Challenger 80 – 32S/24Q/16D; Singles – Doubles	(Tunisia) Malek Jaziri (Spain) Adrián Menéndez Maceiras; 7–5, 6–4	(United States) Keegan Smith (United States) Evan Zhu	(Colombia) Nicolás Mejía (Peru) Nicolás Álvarez	(Argentina) Román Andrés Burruchaga (Argentina) Matías Zukas (Brazil) Felipe Meligeni Alves (South Korea) Chung Yun-seong
June 27	Internationaux de Tennis de Troyes; Troyes, France; Clay – Challenger 50 – 32S/24Q/16D; Singles – Doubles	(Argentina) Juan Bautista Torres; 7–6^{(7–2)}, 6–2	(Lebanon) Benjamin Hassan	(Italy) Raúl Brancaccio (Argentina) Thiago Agustín Tirante	(France) Arthur Fils (Spain) Nikolás Sánchez Izquierdo (France) Calvin Hemery (Belgium) Michael Geerts
June 27	Internationaux de Tennis de Troyes; Troyes, France; Clay – Challenger 50 – 32S/24Q/16D; Singles – Doubles	(Spain) Íñigo Cervantes (Spain) Oriol Roca Batalla; 6–1, 6–2	(Argentina) Thiago Agustín Tirante (Argentina) Juan Bautista Torres	(Italy) Raúl Brancaccio (Argentina) Thiago Agustín Tirante	(France) Arthur Fils (Spain) Nikolás Sánchez Izquierdo (France) Calvin Hemery (Belgium) Michael Geerts

=== July ===
Week of	Tournament	Champions	Runners-up	Semifinalists	Quarterfinalists
July 4	Brawo Open; Braunschweig, Germany; Clay – Challenger 125 – 32S/24Q/16D; Singles – Doubles	(Germany) Jan-Lennard Struff; 6–2, 6–2	(Germany) Maximilian Marterer	(China) Zhang Zhizhen (Switzerland) Henri Laaksonen	(Italy) Marco Cecchinato (Spain) Bernabé Zapata Miralles (Japan) Taro Daniel (Argentina) Federico Coria
July 4	Brawo Open; Braunschweig, Germany; Clay – Challenger 125 – 32S/24Q/16D; Singles – Doubles	(Brazil) Marcelo Demoliner (Germany) Jan-Lennard Struff; 6–4, 7–5	(Czech Republic) Roman Jebavý (Czech Republic) Adam Pavlásek	(China) Zhang Zhizhen (Switzerland) Henri Laaksonen	(Italy) Marco Cecchinato (Spain) Bernabé Zapata Miralles (Japan) Taro Daniel (Argentina) Federico Coria
July 4	Salzburg Open; Salzburg, Austria; Clay – Challenger 125 – 32S/24Q/16D; Singles – Doubles	(Brazil) Thiago Monteiro; 6–3, 7–6^{(7–2)}	(Slovakia) Norbert Gombos	(France) Corentin Moutet (Argentina) Facundo Bagnis	(Austria) Lukas Neumayer (Spain) Pol Martín Tiffon (Austria) Maximilian Neuchrist (Serbia) Dušan Lajović
July 4	Salzburg Open; Salzburg, Austria; Clay – Challenger 125 – 32S/24Q/16D; Singles – Doubles	(United States) Nathaniel Lammons (United States) Jackson Withrow; 7–5, 5–7, [11–9]	(Austria) Alexander Erler (Austria) Lucas Miedler	(France) Corentin Moutet (Argentina) Facundo Bagnis	(Austria) Lukas Neumayer (Spain) Pol Martín Tiffon (Austria) Maximilian Neuchrist (Serbia) Dušan Lajović
July 4	Porto Challenger; Porto, Portugal; Hard – Challenger 80 – 32S/24Q/16D; Singles – Doubles	(Turkey) Altuğ Çelikbilek; 7–6^{(7–5)}, 3–1 ret.	(Australia) Christopher O'Connell	(Australia) James Duckworth (Japan) Yoshihito Nishioka	(United Kingdom) Aidan McHugh; Egor Gerasimov (Japan) Kaichi Uchida (France) Hugo Grenier
July 4	Porto Challenger; Porto, Portugal; Hard – Challenger 80 – 32S/24Q/16D; Singles – Doubles	(India) Yuki Bhambri (India) Saketh Myneni; 6–4, 3–6, [10–6]	(Portugal) Nuno Borges (Portugal) Francisco Cabral	(Australia) James Duckworth (Japan) Yoshihito Nishioka	(United Kingdom) Aidan McHugh; Egor Gerasimov (Japan) Kaichi Uchida (France) Hugo Grenier
July 4	Internazionali di Tennis Città di Todi; Todi, Italy; Clay – Challenger 80 – 32S/24Q/16D; Singles – Doubles	(Argentina) Pedro Cachin; 6–4, 6–4	(Argentina) Nicolás Kicker	(Italy) Francesco Passaro (Germany) Daniel Masur	(Argentina) Santiago Rodríguez Taverna (Italy) Luciano Darderi (Italy) Francesco Maestrelli (Italy) Flavio Cobolli
July 4	Internazionali di Tennis Città di Todi; Todi, Italy; Clay – Challenger 80 – 32S/24Q/16D; Singles – Doubles	(Argentina) Guido Andreozzi (Argentina) Guillermo Durán; 6–1, 2–6, [10–6]	(Monaco) Romain Arneodo (France) Jonathan Eysseric	(Italy) Francesco Passaro (Germany) Daniel Masur	(Argentina) Santiago Rodríguez Taverna (Italy) Luciano Darderi (Italy) Francesco Maestrelli (Italy) Flavio Cobolli
July 4	Open Bogotá; Bogotá, Colombia; Clay – Challenger 80 – 32S/24Q/16D; Singles – Doubles	(Argentina) Juan Pablo Ficovich; 6–1, 6–2	(Austria) Gerald Melzer	(Serbia) Miljan Zekić (Dominican Republic) Nick Hardt	(Peru) Nicolás Álvarez (Brazil) Felipe Meligeni Alves (Argentina) Facundo Juárez (Ecuador) Roberto Quiroz
July 4	Open Bogotá; Bogotá, Colombia; Clay – Challenger 80 – 32S/24Q/16D; Singles – Doubles	(Colombia) Nicolás Mejía (Colombia) Andrés Urrea; 6–3, 6–4	(Argentina) Ignacio Monzón (Argentina) Gonzalo Villanueva	(Serbia) Miljan Zekić (Dominican Republic) Nick Hardt	(Peru) Nicolás Álvarez (Brazil) Felipe Meligeni Alves (Argentina) Facundo Juárez (Ecuador) Roberto Quiroz
July 11	Iași Open; Iași, Romania; Clay – Challenger 100 – 32S/24Q/16D; Singles – Doubles	(Brazil) Felipe Meligeni Alves; 6–3, 4–6, 6–2	(Spain) Pablo Andújar	(Italy) Luciano Darderi (Brazil) Matheus Pucinelli de Almeida	(Czech Republic) Jiří Lehečka (Portugal) Frederico Ferreira Silva (France) Geoffrey Blancaneaux (Slovakia) Lukáš Klein
July 11	Iași Open; Iași, Romania; Clay – Challenger 100 – 32S/24Q/16D; Singles – Doubles	(France) Geoffrey Blancaneaux (Argentina) Renzo Olivo; 6–4, 2–6, [10–6]	(Ecuador) Diego Hidalgo (Colombia) Cristian Rodríguez	(Italy) Luciano Darderi (Brazil) Matheus Pucinelli de Almeida	(Czech Republic) Jiří Lehečka (Portugal) Frederico Ferreira Silva (France) Geoffrey Blancaneaux (Slovakia) Lukáš Klein
July 11	Dutch Open; Amersfoort, Netherlands; Clay – Challenger 80 – 32S/24Q/16D; Singles – Doubles	(Netherlands) Tallon Griekspoor; 6–1, 6–2	(Spain) Roberto Carballés Baena	Ivan Gakhov (Spain) Bernabé Zapata Miralles	(Ukraine) Vitaliy Sachko (Netherlands) Max Houkes (Japan) Taro Daniel (France) Luca Van Assche
July 11	Dutch Open; Amersfoort, Netherlands; Clay – Challenger 80 – 32S/24Q/16D; Singles – Doubles	(Netherlands) Robin Haase (Netherlands) Sem Verbeek; 6–4, 3–6, [10–7]	(Colombia) Nicolás Barrientos (Mexico) Miguel Ángel Reyes-Varela	Ivan Gakhov (Spain) Bernabé Zapata Miralles	(Ukraine) Vitaliy Sachko (Netherlands) Max Houkes (Japan) Taro Daniel (France) Luca Van Assche
July 11	Internazionali di Tennis Città di Verona; Verona, Italy; Clay – Challenger 80 – 32S/24Q/16D; Singles – Doubles	(Italy) Francesco Maestrelli; 3–6, 6–3, 6–0	(Argentina) Pedro Cachin	(Italy) Marco Cecchinato (Austria) Sebastian Ofner	(Switzerland) Jérôme Kym (Slovakia) Filip Horanský (Italy) Flavio Cobolli (Slovakia) Norbert Gombos
July 11	Internazionali di Tennis Città di Verona; Verona, Italy; Clay – Challenger 80 – 32S/24Q/16D; Singles – Doubles	(Venezuela) Luis David Martínez (Italy) Andrea Vavassori; 7–6^{(7–4)}, 3–6, [12–10]	(Argentina) Juan Ignacio Galarza (Slovenia) Tomás Lipovšek Puches	(Italy) Marco Cecchinato (Austria) Sebastian Ofner	(Switzerland) Jérôme Kym (Slovakia) Filip Horanský (Italy) Flavio Cobolli (Slovakia) Norbert Gombos
July 11	Georgia's Rome Challenger; Rome, United States; Hard (i) – Challenger 80 – 32S/24Q/16D; Singles – Doubles	(China) Wu Yibing; 7–5, 6–3	(United States) Ben Shelton	(Japan) Yasutaka Uchiyama (Argentina) Juan Pablo Ficovich	(Japan) Yoshihito Nishioka (United States) Aleksandar Kovacevic (United States) Bjorn Fratangelo (United States) J. J. Wolf
July 11	Georgia's Rome Challenger; Rome, United States; Hard (i) – Challenger 80 – 32S/24Q/16D; Singles – Doubles	(France) Enzo Couacaud (Australia) Andrew Harris; 6–4, 6–2	(Philippines) Ruben Gonzales (United States) Reese Stalder	(Japan) Yasutaka Uchiyama (Argentina) Juan Pablo Ficovich	(Japan) Yoshihito Nishioka (United States) Aleksandar Kovacevic (United States) Bjorn Fratangelo (United States) J. J. Wolf
July 18	Internazionali di Tennis Città di Trieste; Trieste, Italy; Clay – Challenger 100 – 32S/24Q/16D; Singles – Doubles	(Italy) Francesco Passaro; 4–6, 6–3, 6–3	(China) Zhang Zhizhen	(Italy) Francesco Maestrelli (France) Alexandre Müller	(Slovakia) Norbert Gombos (Italy) Salvatore Caruso (Brazil) Felipe Meligeni Alves (Italy) Franco Agamenone
July 18	Internazionali di Tennis Città di Trieste; Trieste, Italy; Clay – Challenger 100 – 32S/24Q/16D; Singles – Doubles	(Ecuador) Diego Hidalgo (Colombia) Cristian Rodríguez; 4–6, 6–3, [10–5]	(Italy) Marco Bortolotti (Spain) Sergio Martos Gornés	(Italy) Francesco Maestrelli (France) Alexandre Müller	(Slovakia) Norbert Gombos (Italy) Salvatore Caruso (Brazil) Felipe Meligeni Alves (Italy) Franco Agamenone
July 18	Open de Tenis Ciudad de Pozoblanco; Pozoblanco, Spain; Hard – Challenger 80 – 32S/24Q/16D; Singles – Doubles	(France) Constant Lestienne; 6–0, 7–6^{(7–3)}	(France) Grégoire Barrère	(France) Ugo Humbert (Germany) Daniel Masur	(France) Maxime Janvier (United States) Emilio Nava (Spain) Alejandro Moro Cañas (France) Antoine Escoffier
July 18	Open de Tenis Ciudad de Pozoblanco; Pozoblanco, Spain; Hard – Challenger 80 – 32S/24Q/16D; Singles – Doubles	(France) Dan Added (France) Albano Olivetti; 3–6, 6–1, [12–10]	(Romania) Victor Vlad Cornea (Venezuela) Luis David Martínez	(France) Ugo Humbert (Germany) Daniel Masur	(France) Maxime Janvier (United States) Emilio Nava (Spain) Alejandro Moro Cañas (France) Antoine Escoffier
July 18	Tampere Open; Tampere, Finland; Clay – Challenger 80 – 32S/24Q/16D; Singles – Doubles	(Hungary) Zsombor Piros; 6–2, 1–6, 6–4	(France) Harold Mayot	(Argentina) Juan Manuel Cerúndolo (France) Laurent Lokoli	(Portugal) Frederico Ferreira Silva (Netherlands) Jelle Sels (Germany) Maximilian Marterer (Austria) Gerald Melzer
July 18	Tampere Open; Tampere, Finland; Clay – Challenger 80 – 32S/24Q/16D; Singles – Doubles	(Austria) Alexander Erler (Austria) Lucas Miedler; 7–6^{(7–3)}, 6–1	(Poland) Karol Drzewiecki (Finland) Patrik Niklas-Salminen	(Argentina) Juan Manuel Cerúndolo (France) Laurent Lokoli	(Portugal) Frederico Ferreira Silva (Netherlands) Jelle Sels (Germany) Maximilian Marterer (Austria) Gerald Melzer
July 18	President's Cup; Nur-Sultan, Kazakhstan; Hard – Challenger 80 – 32S/24Q/16D; Singles – Doubles	Roman Safiullin; 2–6, 6–4, 7–6^{(7–2)}	(Kazakhstan) Denis Yevseyev	(Kazakhstan) Dmitry Popko (Kazakhstan) Beibit Zhukayev	(Zimbabwe) Benjamin Lock; Evgeny Donskoy (Brazil) Gabriel Décamps (Uzbekistan) Denis Istomin
July 18	President's Cup; Nur-Sultan, Kazakhstan; Hard – Challenger 80 – 32S/24Q/16D; Singles – Doubles	(South Korea) Nam Ji-sung (South Korea) Song Min-kyu; 6–2, 3–6, [10–6]	(Czech Republic) Andrew Paulson (Czech Republic) David Poljak	(Kazakhstan) Dmitry Popko (Kazakhstan) Beibit Zhukayev	(Zimbabwe) Benjamin Lock; Evgeny Donskoy (Brazil) Gabriel Décamps (Uzbekistan) Denis Istomin
July 18	Indy Challenger; Indianapolis, United States; Hard (i) – Challenger 80 – 32S/24Q/16D; Singles – Doubles	(China) Wu Yibing; 6–7^{(10–12)}, 7–6^{(15–13)}, 6–3	(United States) Aleksandar Kovacevic	(Japan) Yasutaka Uchiyama (United States) Ben Shelton	(United States) Alex Rybakov (United States) Christopher Eubanks (Germany) Dominik Koepfer (Australia) Max Purcell
July 18	Indy Challenger; Indianapolis, United States; Hard (i) – Challenger 80 – 32S/24Q/16D; Singles – Doubles	(Mexico) Hans Hach Verdugo (United States) Hunter Reese; 7–6^{(7–3)}, 3–6, [10–7]	(India) Purav Raja (India) Divij Sharan	(Japan) Yasutaka Uchiyama (United States) Ben Shelton	(United States) Alex Rybakov (United States) Christopher Eubanks (Germany) Dominik Koepfer (Australia) Max Purcell
July 25	Zug Open; Zug, Switzerland; Clay – Challenger 125 – 32S/24Q/16D; Singles – Doubles	(Switzerland) Dominic Stricker; 5–7, 6–1, 6–3	(Latvia) Ernests Gulbis	(France) Geoffrey Blancaneaux (Bulgaria) Dimitar Kuzmanov	(Switzerland) Marc-Andrea Hüsler (Switzerland) Alexander Ritschard (Italy) Lorenzo Giustino (Austria) Dennis Novak
July 25	Zug Open; Zug, Switzerland; Clay – Challenger 125 – 32S/24Q/16D; Singles – Doubles	(Czech Republic) Zdeněk Kolář (Czech Republic) Adam Pavlásek; 6–3, 7–5	(Poland) Karol Drzewiecki (Finland) Patrik Niklas-Salminen	(France) Geoffrey Blancaneaux (Bulgaria) Dimitar Kuzmanov	(Switzerland) Marc-Andrea Hüsler (Switzerland) Alexander Ritschard (Italy) Lorenzo Giustino (Austria) Dennis Novak
July 25	Open Castilla y León; Segovia, Spain; Hard – Challenger 90 – 32S/24Q/16D; Singles – Doubles	(France) Hugo Grenier; 7–5, 6–3	(France) Constant Lestienne	(France) Ugo Humbert (Belgium) Michael Geerts	(Portugal) Nuno Borges (France) Grégoire Barrère (United States) Emilio Nava (Zimbabwe) Benjamin Lock
July 25	Open Castilla y León; Segovia, Spain; Hard – Challenger 90 – 32S/24Q/16D; Singles – Doubles	(Spain) Nicolás Álvarez Varona (Spain) Iñaki Montes de la Torre; 7–6^{(7–3)}, 6–3	(Zimbabwe) Benjamin Lock (Zimbabwe) Courtney John Lock	(France) Ugo Humbert (Belgium) Michael Geerts	(Portugal) Nuno Borges (France) Grégoire Barrère (United States) Emilio Nava (Zimbabwe) Benjamin Lock
July 25	San Benedetto Tennis Cup; San Benedetto del Tronto, Italy; Clay – Challenger 80 – 32S/24Q/16D; Singles – Doubles	(Italy) Raúl Brancaccio; 6–1, 6–1	(Italy) Andrea Vavassori	(Argentina) Renzo Olivo (Italy) Luciano Darderi	(Italy) Andrea Pellegrino (Brazil) Pedro Boscardin Dias (Italy) Matteo Arnaldi (Italy) Giovanni Fonio
July 25	San Benedetto Tennis Cup; San Benedetto del Tronto, Italy; Clay – Challenger 80 – 32S/24Q/16D; Singles – Doubles	(Ukraine) Vladyslav Manafov (Ukraine) Oleg Prihodko; 4–6, 6–3, [12–10]	(Hungary) Fábián Marozsán (Czech Republic) Lukáš Rosol	(Argentina) Renzo Olivo (Italy) Luciano Darderi	(Italy) Andrea Pellegrino (Brazil) Pedro Boscardin Dias (Italy) Matteo Arnaldi (Italy) Giovanni Fonio
July 25	Winnipeg National Bank Challenger; Winnipeg, Canada; Hard – Challenger 80 – 32S/24Q/16D; Singles – Doubles	(Ecuador) Emilio Gómez; 6–3, 7–6^{(7–4)}	(Canada) Alexis Galarneau	(United States) Evan Zhu (France) Enzo Couacaud	(United Kingdom) Liam Broady (United States) Alafia Ayeni (Australia) Li Tu (Argentina) Genaro Alberto Olivieri
July 25	Winnipeg National Bank Challenger; Winnipeg, Canada; Hard – Challenger 80 – 32S/24Q/16D; Singles – Doubles	(United Kingdom) Billy Harris (Canada) Kelsey Stevenson; 2–6, 7–6^{(11–9)}, [10–8]	(United States) Max Schnur (Australia) John-Patrick Smith	(United States) Evan Zhu (France) Enzo Couacaud	(United Kingdom) Liam Broady (United States) Alafia Ayeni (Australia) Li Tu (Argentina) Genaro Alberto Olivieri

=== August ===
Week of	Tournament	Champions	Runners-up	Semifinalists	Quarterfinalists
August 1	Internazionali di Tennis del Friuli Venezia Giulia; Cordenons, Italy; Clay – Challenger 80 – 32S/24Q/16D; Singles – Doubles	(China) Zhang Zhizhen; 2–6, 7–6^{(7–5)}, 6–3	(Italy) Andrea Vavassori	(France) Alexandre Müller (United States) Nicolas Moreno de Alboran	(Italy) Andrea Pellegrino; Andrey Chepelev (Italy) Mattia Bellucci (Italy) Matteo Arnaldi
August 1	Internazionali di Tennis del Friuli Venezia Giulia; Cordenons, Italy; Clay – Challenger 80 – 32S/24Q/16D; Singles – Doubles	(Jamaica) Dustin Brown (Italy) Andrea Vavassori; 6–4, 7–5	(Serbia) Ivan Sabanov (Serbia) Matej Sabanov	(France) Alexandre Müller (United States) Nicolas Moreno de Alboran	(Italy) Andrea Pellegrino; Andrey Chepelev (Italy) Mattia Bellucci (Italy) Matteo Arnaldi
August 1	Svijany Open; Liberec, Czech Republic; Clay – Challenger 80 – 32S/24Q/16D; Singles – Doubles	(Czech Republic) Jiří Lehečka; 6–4, 6–4	(Spain) Nicolás Álvarez Varona	(France) Giovanni Mpetshi Perricard (Finland) Otto Virtanen	(Czech Republic) Vít Kopřiva (Slovakia) Norbert Gombos (Czech Republic) Tomáš Macháč (Portugal) Nuno Borges
August 1	Svijany Open; Liberec, Czech Republic; Clay – Challenger 80 – 32S/24Q/16D; Singles – Doubles	(Austria) Neil Oberleitner (Austria) Philipp Oswald; 7–6^{(7–5)}, 6–2	(Czech Republic) Roman Jebavý (Czech Republic) Adam Pavlásek	(France) Giovanni Mpetshi Perricard (Finland) Otto Virtanen	(Czech Republic) Vít Kopřiva (Slovakia) Norbert Gombos (Czech Republic) Tomáš Macháč (Portugal) Nuno Borges
August 1	Lexington Challenger; Lexington, United States; Hard – Challenger 80 – 32S/24Q/16D; Singles – Doubles	(China) Shang Juncheng; 6–4, 6–4	(Ecuador) Emilio Gómez	(United States) Aleksandar Kovacevic (France) Enzo Couacaud	Roman Safiullin (Ecuador) Roberto Quiroz (United States) Govind Nanda (Colombia) Nicolás Mejía
August 1	Lexington Challenger; Lexington, United States; Hard – Challenger 80 – 32S/24Q/16D; Singles – Doubles	(India) Yuki Bhambri (India) Saketh Myneni; 3–6, 6–4, [10–8]	(Netherlands) Gijs Brouwer (United Kingdom) Aidan McHugh	(United States) Aleksandar Kovacevic (France) Enzo Couacaud	Roman Safiullin (Ecuador) Roberto Quiroz (United States) Govind Nanda (Colombia) Nicolás Mejía
August 8	San Marino Open; San Marino, San Marino; Clay – Challenger 90 – 32S/24Q/16D; Singles – Doubles	Pavel Kotov; 7–6^{(7–5)}, 6–4	(Italy) Matteo Arnaldi	(Romania) Filip Cristian Jianu (Italy) Marco Cecchinato	(Spain) Nikolás Sánchez Izquierdo (Hungary) Fábián Marozsán (Monaco) Valentin Vacherot (Italy) Alexander Weis
August 8	San Marino Open; San Marino, San Marino; Clay – Challenger 90 – 32S/24Q/16D; Singles – Doubles	(Italy) Marco Bortolotti (Spain) Sergio Martos Gornés; 6–4, 6–4	(Serbia) Ivan Sabanov (Serbia) Matej Sabanov	(Romania) Filip Cristian Jianu (Italy) Marco Cecchinato	(Spain) Nikolás Sánchez Izquierdo (Hungary) Fábián Marozsán (Monaco) Valentin Vacherot (Italy) Alexander Weis
August 8	Meerbusch Challenger; Meerbusch, Germany; Clay – Challenger 80 – 32S/24Q/16D; Singles – Doubles	(Spain) Bernabé Zapata Miralles; 6–1, 6–2	(Austria) Dennis Novak	(France) Clément Tabur (Italy) Riccardo Bonadio	(India) Sumit Nagal (Germany) Mats Moraing (Bosnia and Herzegovina) Damir Džumhur (Czech Republic) Jonáš Forejtek
August 8	Meerbusch Challenger; Meerbusch, Germany; Clay – Challenger 80 – 32S/24Q/16D; Singles – Doubles	(Netherlands) David Pel (Poland) Szymon Walków; 7–5, 6–1	(Austria) Neil Oberleitner (Austria) Philipp Oswald	(France) Clément Tabur (Italy) Riccardo Bonadio	(India) Sumit Nagal (Germany) Mats Moraing (Bosnia and Herzegovina) Damir Džumhur (Czech Republic) Jonáš Forejtek
August 8	Chicago Men's Challenger; Chicago, United States; Hard – Challenger 80 – 32S/24Q/16D; Singles – Doubles	Roman Safiullin; 6–3, 4–6, 7–5	(United States) Ben Shelton	(Moldova) Radu Albot (Netherlands) Gijs Brouwer	(Croatia) Borna Gojo (United States) Zachary Svajda (Australia) Jordan Thompson (United Kingdom) Liam Broady
August 8	Chicago Men's Challenger; Chicago, United States; Hard – Challenger 80 – 32S/24Q/16D; Singles – Doubles	(Sweden) André Göransson (Japan) Ben McLachlan; 6–4, 6–7^{(3–7)}, [10–5]	(United States) Evan King (United States) Mitchell Krueger	(Moldova) Radu Albot (Netherlands) Gijs Brouwer	(Croatia) Borna Gojo (United States) Zachary Svajda (Australia) Jordan Thompson (United Kingdom) Liam Broady
August 8	Lima Challenger; Lima, Peru; Clay – Challenger 80 – 32S/24Q/16D; Singles – Doubles	(Argentina) Camilo Ugo Carabelli; 6–2, 7–6^{(7–4)}	(Argentina) Thiago Agustín Tirante	(Argentina) Tomás Martín Etcheverry (Peru) Gonzalo Bueno	(Argentina) Renzo Olivo (Argentina) Facundo Mena (Portugal) Gastão Elias (Peru) Juan Pablo Varillas
August 8	Lima Challenger; Lima, Peru; Clay – Challenger 80 – 32S/24Q/16D; Singles – Doubles	(Uruguay) Ignacio Carou (Argentina) Facundo Mena; 6–2, 6–2	(Brazil) Orlando Luz (Argentina) Camilo Ugo Carabelli	(Argentina) Tomás Martín Etcheverry (Peru) Gonzalo Bueno	(Argentina) Renzo Olivo (Argentina) Facundo Mena (Portugal) Gastão Elias (Peru) Juan Pablo Varillas
August 15	República Dominicana Open; Santo Domingo, Dominican Republic; Clay – Challenger 125 – 32S/24Q/16D; Singles – Doubles	(Argentina) Pedro Cachin; 6–4, 2–6, 6–3	(Argentina) Marco Trungelliti	(Colombia) Daniel Elahi Galán (Argentina) Tomás Martín Etcheverry	(Spain) Roberto Carballés Baena (Argentina) Thiago Agustín Tirante (Argentina) Renzo Olivo (Argentina) Facundo Mena
August 15	República Dominicana Open; Santo Domingo, Dominican Republic; Clay – Challenger 125 – 32S/24Q/16D; Singles – Doubles	(Philippines) Ruben Gonzales (United States) Reese Stalder; 7–6^{(7–5)}, 6–3	(Colombia) Nicolás Barrientos (Mexico) Miguel Ángel Reyes-Varela	(Colombia) Daniel Elahi Galán (Argentina) Tomás Martín Etcheverry	(Spain) Roberto Carballés Baena (Argentina) Thiago Agustín Tirante (Argentina) Renzo Olivo (Argentina) Facundo Mena
August 15	Odlum Brown Vancouver Open; Vancouver, Canada; Hard – Challenger 125 – 32S/24Q/16D; Singles – Doubles	(France) Constant Lestienne; 6–0, 4–6, 6–3	(France) Arthur Rinderknech	(France) Ugo Humbert (Canada) Vasek Pospisil	(Spain) Fernando Verdasco (Sweden) Mikael Ymer (Lithuania) Ričardas Berankis (France) Gilles Simon
August 15	Odlum Brown Vancouver Open; Vancouver, Canada; Hard – Challenger 125 – 32S/24Q/16D; Singles – Doubles	(Sweden) André Göransson (Japan) Ben McLachlan; 6–7^{(4–7)}, 7–6^{(9–7)}, [11–9]	(Philippines) Treat Huey (Australia) John-Patrick Smith	(France) Ugo Humbert (Canada) Vasek Pospisil	(Spain) Fernando Verdasco (Sweden) Mikael Ymer (Lithuania) Ričardas Berankis (France) Gilles Simon
August 15	Kozerki Open; Grodzisk Mazowiecki, Poland; Hard – Challenger 90 – 32S/24Q/16D; Singles – Doubles	(Czech Republic) Tomáš Macháč; 1–6, 6–3, 6–2	(China) Zhang Zhizhen	(France) Harold Mayot (Tunisia) Skander Mansouri	(Netherlands) Robin Haase (Brazil) Gabriel Décamps (Germany) Marko Topo; Alexey Vatutin
August 15	Kozerki Open; Grodzisk Mazowiecki, Poland; Hard – Challenger 90 – 32S/24Q/16D; Singles – Doubles	(Netherlands) Robin Haase (Austria) Philipp Oswald; 6–3, 6–4	(Monaco) Hugo Nys (France) Fabien Reboul	(France) Harold Mayot (Tunisia) Skander Mansouri	(Netherlands) Robin Haase (Brazil) Gabriel Décamps (Germany) Marko Topo; Alexey Vatutin
August 22	Banja Luka Challenger; Banja Luka, Bosnia and Herzegovina; Clay – Challenger 80 – 32S/24Q/16D; Singles – Doubles	(Hungary) Fábián Marozsán; 6–2, 6–1	(Bosnia and Herzegovina) Damir Džumhur	(Peru) Nicolás Álvarez (Sweden) Dragoș Nicolae Mădăraș	(Belgium) Kimmer Coppejans (Bosnia and Herzegovina) Nerman Fatić (Lebanon) Benjamin Hassan; Alexey Vatutin
August 22	Banja Luka Challenger; Banja Luka, Bosnia and Herzegovina; Clay – Challenger 80 – 32S/24Q/16D; Singles – Doubles	(Ukraine) Vladyslav Manafov (Ukraine) Oleg Prihodko; 6–3, 6–4	(Germany) Fabian Fallert (Germany) Hendrik Jebens	(Peru) Nicolás Álvarez (Sweden) Dragoș Nicolae Mădăraș	(Belgium) Kimmer Coppejans (Bosnia and Herzegovina) Nerman Fatić (Lebanon) Benjamin Hassan; Alexey Vatutin
August 22	Championnats Banque Nationale de Granby; Granby, Canada; Hard – Challenger 80 – 32S/24Q/16D; Singles – Doubles	(Canada) Gabriel Diallo; 7–5, 7–6^{(7–5)}	(China) Shang Juncheng	(Japan) Hiroki Moriya (United States) Aidan Mayo	(Tunisia) Aziz Dougaz (France) Ugo Humbert (Australia) Jordan Thompson (Colombia) Nicolás Mejía
August 22	Championnats Banque Nationale de Granby; Granby, Canada; Hard – Challenger 80 – 32S/24Q/16D; Singles – Doubles	(United Kingdom) Julian Cash (United Kingdom) Henry Patten; 6–3, 6–2	(France) Jonathan Eysseric (New Zealand) Artem Sitak	(Japan) Hiroki Moriya (United States) Aidan Mayo	(Tunisia) Aziz Dougaz (France) Ugo Humbert (Australia) Jordan Thompson (Colombia) Nicolás Mejía
August 22	IBG Prague Open; Prague, Czech Republic; Clay – Challenger 50 – 32S/24Q/16D; Singles – Doubles	(Ukraine) Oleksii Krutykh; 6–3, 6–7^{(2–7)}, 6–2	(Germany) Lucas Gerch	(Portugal) João Domingues (Czech Republic) Jakub Menšík	(Italy) Matteo Gigante (Argentina) Mariano Navone (Uruguay) Martín Cuevas (United States) Nicolas Moreno de Alboran
August 22	IBG Prague Open; Prague, Czech Republic; Clay – Challenger 50 – 32S/24Q/16D; Singles – Doubles	(Romania) Victor Vlad Cornea (Czech Republic) Andrew Paulson; 6–3, 6–1	(Bulgaria) Adrian Andreev (Bolivia) Murkel Dellien	(Portugal) João Domingues (Czech Republic) Jakub Menšík	(Italy) Matteo Gigante (Argentina) Mariano Navone (Uruguay) Martín Cuevas (United States) Nicolas Moreno de Alboran
August 22	Nonthaburi Challenger; Nonthaburi, Thailand; Hard – Challenger 50 – 32S/24Q/16D; Singles – Doubles	(Monaco) Valentin Vacherot; 6–3, 7–6^{(7–4)}	(Vietnam) Lý Hoàng Nam	(Australia) Dane Sweeny (Japan) Yasutaka Uchiyama	(United Kingdom) Alastair Gray; Alibek Kachmazov (France) Kyrian Jacquet (Australia) Omar Jasika
August 22	Nonthaburi Challenger; Nonthaburi, Thailand; Hard – Challenger 50 – 32S/24Q/16D; Singles – Doubles	Evgeny Donskoy; Alibek Kachmazov; 6–3, 1–6, [10–7]	(South Korea) Nam Ji-sung (South Korea) Song Min-kyu	(Australia) Dane Sweeny (Japan) Yasutaka Uchiyama	(United Kingdom) Alastair Gray; Alibek Kachmazov (France) Kyrian Jacquet (Australia) Omar Jasika
August 29	Città di Como Challenger; Como, Italy; Clay – Challenger 80 – 32S/24Q/16D; Singles – Doubles	(Germany) Cedrik-Marcel Stebe; 7–6^{(7–2)}, 6–4	(Italy) Francesco Passaro	(Italy) Matteo Arnaldi (Slovakia) Lukáš Klein	(Bosnia and Herzegovina) Nerman Fatić (France) Kenny de Schepper (Italy) Matteo Gigante (Italy) Riccardo Bonadio
August 29	Città di Como Challenger; Como, Italy; Clay – Challenger 80 – 32S/24Q/16D; Singles – Doubles	(Austria) Alexander Erler (Austria) Lucas Miedler; 6–1, 7–6^{(7–3)}	(Jamaica) Dustin Brown (Germany) Julian Lenz	(Italy) Matteo Arnaldi (Slovakia) Lukáš Klein	(Bosnia and Herzegovina) Nerman Fatić (France) Kenny de Schepper (Italy) Matteo Gigante (Italy) Riccardo Bonadio
August 29	Rafa Nadal Open; Mallorca, Spain; Hard – Challenger 80 – 32S/24Q/16D; Singles – Doubles	(Italy) Luca Nardi; 7–6^{(7–2)}, 3–6, 7–5	(Belgium) Zizou Bergs	(Jordan) Abedallah Shelbayh (Bulgaria) Alexandar Lazarov	(Kazakhstan) Dmitry Popko (United Kingdom) Jay Clarke (Kazakhstan) Mikhail Kukushkin (Poland) Jerzy Janowicz
August 29	Rafa Nadal Open; Mallorca, Spain; Hard – Challenger 80 – 32S/24Q/16D; Singles – Doubles	(India) Yuki Bhambri (India) Saketh Myneni; 6–2, 6–2	(Czech Republic) Marek Gengel (Czech Republic) Lukáš Rosol	(Jordan) Abedallah Shelbayh (Bulgaria) Alexandar Lazarov	(Kazakhstan) Dmitry Popko (United Kingdom) Jay Clarke (Kazakhstan) Mikhail Kukushkin (Poland) Jerzy Janowicz
August 29	Internationaux de Tennis de Toulouse; Toulouse, France; Clay – Challenger 80 – 32S/24Q/16D; Singles – Doubles	(Belgium) Kimmer Coppejans; 6–7^{(8–10)}, 6–4, 6–3	(France) Maxime Janvier	(France) Titouan Droguet (Germany) Louis Wessels	(Portugal) Frederico Ferreira Silva (France) Arthur Fils (Argentina) Marco Trungelliti (France) Luca Van Assche
August 29	Internationaux de Tennis de Toulouse; Toulouse, France; Clay – Challenger 80 – 32S/24Q/16D; Singles – Doubles	(France) Maxime Janvier (Tunisia) Malek Jaziri; 6–3, 7–6^{(7–5)}	(France) Théo Arribagé (France) Titouan Droguet	(France) Titouan Droguet (Germany) Louis Wessels	(Portugal) Frederico Ferreira Silva (France) Arthur Fils (Argentina) Marco Trungelliti (France) Luca Van Assche
August 29	Nonthaburi Challenger II; Nonthaburi, Thailand; Hard – Challenger 50 – 32S/24Q/16D; Singles – Doubles	(France) Arthur Cazaux; 7–6^{(8–6)}, 6–4	(Australia) Omar Jasika	(Kazakhstan) Beibit Zhukayev (Brazil) Gabriel Décamps	(Monaco) Valentin Vacherot (Australia) Dane Sweeny (Italy) Federico Gaio (United Kingdom) Charles Broom
August 29	Nonthaburi Challenger II; Nonthaburi, Thailand; Hard – Challenger 50 – 32S/24Q/16D; Singles – Doubles	(Zimbabwe) Benjamin Lock (Japan) Yuta Shimizu; 6–1, 6–3	(Philippines) Francis Alcantara (Indonesia) Christopher Rungkat	(Kazakhstan) Beibit Zhukayev (Brazil) Gabriel Décamps	(Monaco) Valentin Vacherot (Australia) Dane Sweeny (Italy) Federico Gaio (United Kingdom) Charles Broom

=== September ===
Week of	Tournament	Champions	Runners-up	Semifinalists	Quarterfinalists
September 5	NÖ Open; Tulln an der Donau, Austria; Clay – Challenger 100 – 32S/24Q/16D; Singles – Doubles	(Slovakia) Jozef Kovalík; 7–6^{(8–6)}, 7–6^{(7–3)}	(Netherlands) Jelle Sels	(Slovakia) Norbert Gombos (Sweden) Elias Ymer	(Italy) Giulio Zeppieri (Austria) Sebastian Ofner (Slovakia) Lukáš Klein (Austria) Jurij Rodionov
September 5	NÖ Open; Tulln an der Donau, Austria; Clay – Challenger 100 – 32S/24Q/16D; Singles – Doubles	(Austria) Alexander Erler (Austria) Lucas Miedler; 6–3, 6–4	(Czech Republic) Zdeněk Kolář (Ukraine) Denys Molchanov	(Slovakia) Norbert Gombos (Sweden) Elias Ymer	(Italy) Giulio Zeppieri (Austria) Sebastian Ofner (Slovakia) Lukáš Klein (Austria) Jurij Rodionov
September 5	Copa Sevilla; Seville, Spain; Clay – Challenger 90 – 32S/24Q/16D; Singles – Doubles	(Spain) Roberto Carballés Baena; 6–3, 7–6^{(8–6)}	(Spain) Bernabé Zapata Miralles	(Argentina) Facundo Díaz Acosta (Kazakhstan) Timofey Skatov	(Belgium) Kimmer Coppejans (Argentina) Federico Delbonis (Poland) Jerzy Janowicz (Hungary) Fábián Marozsán
September 5	Copa Sevilla; Seville, Spain; Clay – Challenger 90 – 32S/24Q/16D; Singles – Doubles	(Argentina) Román Andrés Burruchaga (Argentina) Facundo Díaz Acosta; 7–5, 6–7^{(8–10)}, [10–7]	(Spain) Nicolás Álvarez Varona (Spain) Alberto Barroso Campos	(Argentina) Facundo Díaz Acosta (Kazakhstan) Timofey Skatov	(Belgium) Kimmer Coppejans (Argentina) Federico Delbonis (Poland) Jerzy Janowicz (Hungary) Fábián Marozsán
September 5	Cassis Open Provence; Cassis, France; Hard – Challenger 80 – 32S/24Q/16D; Singles – Doubles	(France) Hugo Grenier; 7–5, 6–4	(Australia) James Duckworth	(Italy) Francesco Maestrelli (Czech Republic) Tomáš Macháč	(France) Constant Lestienne (Japan) Kaichi Uchida (Hungary) Zsombor Piros (Croatia) Borna Gojo
September 5	Cassis Open Provence; Cassis, France; Hard – Challenger 80 – 32S/24Q/16D; Singles – Doubles	(Belgium) Michael Geerts (Belgium) Joran Vliegen; 6–4, 7–6^{(8–6)}	(Monaco) Romain Arneodo (France) Albano Olivetti	(Italy) Francesco Maestrelli (Czech Republic) Tomáš Macháč	(France) Constant Lestienne (Japan) Kaichi Uchida (Hungary) Zsombor Piros (Croatia) Borna Gojo
September 5	Nonthaburi Challenger III; Nonthaburi, Thailand; Hard – Challenger 50 – 32S/24Q/16D; Singles – Doubles	(United Kingdom) Stuart Parker; 6–4, 4–1 ret.	(France) Arthur Cazaux	(Japan) Sho Shimabukuro (Australia) Omar Jasika	(Japan) Yosuke Watanuki (United Kingdom) Billy Harris (Vietnam) Lý Hoàng Nam (Japan) Makoto Ochi
September 5	Nonthaburi Challenger III; Nonthaburi, Thailand; Hard – Challenger 50 – 32S/24Q/16D; Singles – Doubles	(South Korea) Chung Yun-seong (New Zealand) Ajeet Rai; 6–1, 7–6^{(8–6)}	(Philippines) Francis Alcantara (Indonesia) Christopher Rungkat	(Japan) Sho Shimabukuro (Australia) Omar Jasika	(Japan) Yosuke Watanuki (United Kingdom) Billy Harris (Vietnam) Lý Hoàng Nam (Japan) Makoto Ochi
September 12	Pekao Szczecin Open; Szczecin, Poland; Clay – Challenger 125 – 32S/24Q/16D; Singles – Doubles	(France) Corentin Moutet; 6–2, 6–7^{(5–7)}, 6–4	(Austria) Dennis Novak	(Italy) Raúl Brancaccio; Alexander Shevchenko	(Argentina) Federico Delbonis (United Kingdom) Jan Choinski (Italy) Matteo Arnaldi (Spain) Roberto Carballés Baena
September 12	Pekao Szczecin Open; Szczecin, Poland; Clay – Challenger 125 – 32S/24Q/16D; Singles – Doubles	(Jamaica) Dustin Brown (Italy) Andrea Vavassori; 6–4, 5–7, [10–8]	(Czech Republic) Roman Jebavý (Czech Republic) Adam Pavlásek	(Italy) Raúl Brancaccio; Alexander Shevchenko	(Argentina) Federico Delbonis (United Kingdom) Jan Choinski (Italy) Matteo Arnaldi (Spain) Roberto Carballés Baena
September 12	Open de Rennes; Rennes, France; Hard (i) – Challenger 90 – 32S/24Q/16D; Singles – Doubles	(France) Ugo Humbert; 6–3, 6–0	(Austria) Dominic Thiem	(France) Hugo Gaston (Germany) Peter Gojowczyk	(France) Benoît Paire (Bulgaria) Adrian Andreev (Netherlands) Gijs Brouwer (France) Grégoire Barrère
September 12	Open de Rennes; Rennes, France; Hard (i) – Challenger 90 – 32S/24Q/16D; Singles – Doubles	(France) Jonathan Eysseric (Netherlands) David Pel; 6–4, 6–4	(France) Dan Added (France) Albano Olivetti	(France) Hugo Gaston (Germany) Peter Gojowczyk	(France) Benoît Paire (Bulgaria) Adrian Andreev (Netherlands) Gijs Brouwer (France) Grégoire Barrère
September 12	Istanbul Challenger; Istanbul, Turkey; Hard – Challenger 80 – 32S/24Q/16D; Singles – Doubles	(Moldova) Radu Albot; 6–2, 6–0	(Czech Republic) Lukáš Rosol	(Turkey) Koray Kırcı (France) Geoffrey Blancaneaux	(France) Laurent Lokoli (Austria) Sebastian Ofner (France) Harold Mayot (Kazakhstan) Beibit Zhukayev
September 12	Istanbul Challenger; Istanbul, Turkey; Hard – Challenger 80 – 32S/24Q/16D; Singles – Doubles	(India) Purav Raja (India) Divij Sharan; 6–4, 3–6, [10–8]	(India) Arjun Kadhe (Brazil) Fernando Romboli	(Turkey) Koray Kırcı (France) Geoffrey Blancaneaux	(France) Laurent Lokoli (Austria) Sebastian Ofner (France) Harold Mayot (Kazakhstan) Beibit Zhukayev
September 12	Cary Challenger; Cary, United States; Hard – Challenger 80 – 32S/24Q/16D; Singles – Doubles	(United States) Michael Mmoh; 7–5, 6–3	(Germany) Dominik Koepfer	(United States) Denis Kudla (Australia) Jordan Thompson	(Argentina) Facundo Mena (United States) Tennys Sandgren (Japan) Yasutaka Uchiyama (United States) Nick Chappell
September 12	Cary Challenger; Cary, United States; Hard – Challenger 80 – 32S/24Q/16D; Singles – Doubles	(United States) Nathaniel Lammons (United States) Jackson Withrow; 7–5, 2–6, [10–5]	(Philippines) Treat Huey (Australia) John-Patrick Smith	(United States) Denis Kudla (Australia) Jordan Thompson	(Argentina) Facundo Mena (United States) Tennys Sandgren (Japan) Yasutaka Uchiyama (United States) Nick Chappell
September 19	AON Open Challenger; Genoa, Italy; Clay – Challenger 125 – 32S/24Q/16D; Singles – Doubles	(Brazil) Thiago Monteiro; 6–1, 7–6^{(7–2)}	(Italy) Andrea Pellegrino	(Serbia) Dušan Lajović (Bulgaria) Adrian Andreev	(Spain) Albert Ramos Viñolas (Italy) Marco Cecchinato (Italy) Raúl Brancaccio (Austria) Sebastian Ofner
September 19	AON Open Challenger; Genoa, Italy; Clay – Challenger 125 – 32S/24Q/16D; Singles – Doubles	(Jamaica) Dustin Brown (Italy) Andrea Vavassori; 6–2, 6–2	(Czech Republic) Roman Jebavý (Czech Republic) Adam Pavlásek	(Serbia) Dušan Lajović (Bulgaria) Adrian Andreev	(Spain) Albert Ramos Viñolas (Italy) Marco Cecchinato (Italy) Raúl Brancaccio (Austria) Sebastian Ofner
September 19	Braga Open; Braga, Portugal; Clay – Challenger 80 – 32S/24Q/16D; Singles – Doubles	(United States) Nicolas Moreno de Alboran; 6–2, 6–4	(Brazil) Matheus Pucinelli de Almeida	(Netherlands) Jelle Sels (Kazakhstan) Timofey Skatov	(Spain) Pablo Llamas Ruiz; Alexander Shevchenko (Spain) Javier Barranco Cosano (Spain) Carlos Taberner
September 19	Braga Open; Braga, Portugal; Clay – Challenger 80 – 32S/24Q/16D; Singles – Doubles	(Czech Republic) Vít Kopřiva (Czech Republic) Jaroslav Pospíšil; 3–6, 6–3, [10–4]	(India) Jeevan Nedunchezhiyan (Indonesia) Christopher Rungkat	(Netherlands) Jelle Sels (Kazakhstan) Timofey Skatov	(Spain) Pablo Llamas Ruiz; Alexander Shevchenko (Spain) Javier Barranco Cosano (Spain) Carlos Taberner
September 19	Columbus Challenger II; Columbus, United States; Hard (i) – Challenger 80 – 32S/24Q/16D; Singles – Doubles	(Australia) Jordan Thompson; 7–6^{(8–6)}, 6–2	(Ecuador) Emilio Gómez	(United States) Cannon Kingsley (Australia) Rinky Hijikata	(Canada) Gabriel Diallo (Australia) Aleksandar Vukic (Switzerland) Dominic Stricker (United States) Nick Chappell
September 19	Columbus Challenger II; Columbus, United States; Hard (i) – Challenger 80 – 32S/24Q/16D; Singles – Doubles	(United Kingdom) Julian Cash (United Kingdom) Henry Patten; 6–2, 7–5	(United Kingdom) Charles Broom (Germany) Constantin Frantzen	(United States) Cannon Kingsley (Australia) Rinky Hijikata	(Canada) Gabriel Diallo (Australia) Aleksandar Vukic (Switzerland) Dominic Stricker (United States) Nick Chappell
September 19	Sibiu Open; Sibiu, Romania; Clay – Challenger 80 – 32S/24Q/16D; Singles – Doubles	(Bosnia and Herzegovina) Nerman Fatić; 6–3, 6–4	(Bosnia and Herzegovina) Damir Džumhur	(Argentina) Federico Coria (Romania) Nicholas David Ionel	(Hungary) Máté Valkusz; Ivan Gakhov (Slovakia) Lukáš Klein (Austria) Filip Misolic
September 19	Sibiu Open; Sibiu, Romania; Clay – Challenger 80 – 32S/24Q/16D; Singles – Doubles	(Serbia) Ivan Sabanov (Serbia) Matej Sabanov; 3–6, 7–5, [10–4]	(Austria) Alexander Erler (Austria) Lucas Miedler	(Argentina) Federico Coria (Romania) Nicholas David Ionel	(Hungary) Máté Valkusz; Ivan Gakhov (Slovakia) Lukáš Klein (Austria) Filip Misolic
September 19	Challenger de Villa María; Villa María, Argentina; Clay – Challenger 80 – 32S/24Q/16D; Singles – Doubles	(Argentina) Nicolás Kicker; 7–5, 6–3	(Argentina) Mariano Navone	(Argentina) Facundo Díaz Acosta (Argentina) Facundo Bagnis	(Germany) Yannick Hanfmann (Argentina) Renzo Olivo (Argentina) Hernán Casanova (Argentina) Juan Manuel Cerúndolo
September 19	Challenger de Villa María; Villa María, Argentina; Clay – Challenger 80 – 32S/24Q/16D; Singles – Doubles	(Argentina) Hernán Casanova (Argentina) Santiago Rodríguez Taverna; 6–4, 6–3	(Argentina) Facundo Juárez (Argentina) Ignacio Monzón	(Argentina) Facundo Díaz Acosta (Argentina) Facundo Bagnis	(Germany) Yannick Hanfmann (Argentina) Renzo Olivo (Argentina) Hernán Casanova (Argentina) Juan Manuel Cerúndolo
September 26	Open d'Orléans; Orléans, France; Hard (i) – Challenger 125 – 32S/24Q/16D; Singles – Doubles	(France) Grégoire Barrère; 4–6, 6–3, 6–4	(France) Quentin Halys	(Bulgaria) Adrian Andreev (France) Hugo Gaston	(Slovakia) Norbert Gombos (France) Evan Furness (France) Richard Gasquet (United States) Jack Sock
September 26	Open d'Orléans; Orléans, France; Hard (i) – Challenger 125 – 32S/24Q/16D; Singles – Doubles	(France) Nicolas Mahut (France) Édouard Roger-Vasselin; 6–2, 6–4	(Belgium) Michael Geerts (Tunisia) Skander Mansouri	(Bulgaria) Adrian Andreev (France) Hugo Gaston	(Slovakia) Norbert Gombos (France) Evan Furness (France) Richard Gasquet (United States) Jack Sock
September 26	Challenger de Buenos Aires; Buenos Aires, Argentina; Clay – Challenger 80 – 32S/24Q/16D; Singles – Doubles	(Argentina) Juan Manuel Cerúndolo; 6–4, 2–6, 7–5	(Argentina) Camilo Ugo Carabelli	(Argentina) Mariano Navone (Kazakhstan) Dmitry Popko	(Brazil) Thiago Seyboth Wild (Argentina) Facundo Bagnis (Argentina) Renzo Olivo (Argentina) Román Andrés Burruchaga
September 26	Challenger de Buenos Aires; Buenos Aires, Argentina; Clay – Challenger 80 – 32S/24Q/16D; Singles – Doubles	(Argentina) Guido Andreozzi (Argentina) Guillermo Durán; 6–0, 7–5	(Argentina) Román Andrés Burruchaga (Argentina) Facundo Díaz Acosta	(Argentina) Mariano Navone (Kazakhstan) Dmitry Popko	(Brazil) Thiago Seyboth Wild (Argentina) Facundo Bagnis (Argentina) Renzo Olivo (Argentina) Román Andrés Burruchaga
September 26	LTP Men's Open; Charleston, United States; Hard – Challenger 80 – 32S/24Q/16D; Singles – Doubles	Competition was abandoned after play on Wednesday due to forecasted impacts from Hurricane Ian on South Carolina			(Australia) Jordan Thompson (Italy) Giovanni Oradini (United States) Zachary Svajda (United States) Donald Young
September 26	Lisboa Belém Open; Lisbon, Portugal; Clay – Challenger 80 – 32S/24Q/16D; Singles – Doubles	(Italy) Marco Cecchinato; 6–3, 6–3	(France) Luca Van Assche	(Austria) Filip Misolic (Kazakhstan) Timofey Skatov	(France) Alexandre Müller (Italy) Giulio Zeppieri (France) Benoît Paire (Spain) Carlos Taberner
September 26	Lisboa Belém Open; Lisbon, Portugal; Clay – Challenger 80 – 32S/24Q/16D; Singles – Doubles	(Czech Republic) Zdeněk Kolář (Portugal) Gonçalo Oliveira; 6–1, 7–6^{(7–4)}	(Ukraine) Vladyslav Manafov (Ukraine) Oleg Prihodko	(Austria) Filip Misolic (Kazakhstan) Timofey Skatov	(France) Alexandre Müller (Italy) Giulio Zeppieri (France) Benoît Paire (Spain) Carlos Taberner

=== October ===
Week of	Tournament	Champions	Runners-up	Semifinalists	Quarterfinalists
October 3	Parma Challenger; Parma, Italy; Clay – Challenger 125 – 32S/24Q/16D; Singles – Doubles	(Kazakhstan) Timofey Skatov; 7–5, 6–7^{(2–7)}, 6–4	(Slovakia) Jozef Kovalík	(Czech Republic) Vít Kopřiva (Italy) Gianluca Mager	(Spain) Roberto Carballés Baena (Italy) Andrea Vavassori (Hungary) Máté Valkusz (Serbia) Dušan Lajović
October 3	Parma Challenger; Parma, Italy; Clay – Challenger 125 – 32S/24Q/16D; Singles – Doubles	(Bosnia and Herzegovina) Tomislav Brkić (Serbia) Nikola Ćaćić; 6–2, 6–2	(Venezuela) Luis David Martínez (Slovakia) Igor Zelenay	(Czech Republic) Vít Kopřiva (Italy) Gianluca Mager	(Spain) Roberto Carballés Baena (Italy) Andrea Vavassori (Hungary) Máté Valkusz (Serbia) Dušan Lajović
October 3	Internationaux de Tennis de Vendée; Mouilleron-le-Captif, France; Hard (i) – Challenger 90 – 32S/24Q/16D; Singles – Doubles	(Netherlands) Jelle Sels; 6–4, 6–3	(Canada) Vasek Pospisil	(France) Jurgen Briand (France) Hugo Gaston	(Finland) Otto Virtanen (Czech Republic) Tomáš Macháč (Slovakia) Norbert Gombos (United States) J. J. Wolf
October 3	Internationaux de Tennis de Vendée; Mouilleron-le-Captif, France; Hard (i) – Challenger 90 – 32S/24Q/16D; Singles – Doubles	(Netherlands) Sander Arends (Netherlands) David Pel; 6–7^{(1–7)}, 7–6^{(8–6)}, [10–6]	(India) Purav Raja (India) Divij Sharan	(France) Jurgen Briand (France) Hugo Gaston	(Finland) Otto Virtanen (Czech Republic) Tomáš Macháč (Slovakia) Norbert Gombos (United States) J. J. Wolf
October 3	JC Ferrero Challenger Open; Alicante, Spain; Hard – Challenger 80 – 32S/24Q/16D; Singles – Doubles	(Slovakia) Lukáš Klein; 6–3, 6–4	(Dominican Republic) Nick Hardt	(Hungary) Fábián Marozsán (Italy) Matteo Arnaldi	(Italy) Salvatore Caruso (Bulgaria) Dimitar Kuzmanov (Portugal) Frederico Ferreira Silva (United States) Emilio Nava
October 3	JC Ferrero Challenger Open; Alicante, Spain; Hard – Challenger 80 – 32S/24Q/16D; Singles – Doubles	(Netherlands) Robin Haase (France) Albano Olivetti; 7–6^{(7–5)}, 7–5	(Uzbekistan) Sanjar Fayziev (Uzbekistan) Sergey Fomin	(Hungary) Fábián Marozsán (Italy) Matteo Arnaldi	(Italy) Salvatore Caruso (Bulgaria) Dimitar Kuzmanov (Portugal) Frederico Ferreira Silva (United States) Emilio Nava
October 3	Campeonato Internacional de Tênis de Campinas; Campinas, Brazil; Clay – Challenger 80 – 32S/24Q/16D; Singles – Doubles	(United Kingdom) Jan Choinski; 6–4, 6–4	(Peru) Juan Pablo Varillas	(Switzerland) Rémy Bertola (Italy) Luciano Darderi	(Argentina) Facundo Mena (France) Alexandre Müller (Argentina) Facundo Bagnis (Argentina) Facundo Juárez
October 3	Campeonato Internacional de Tênis de Campinas; Campinas, Brazil; Clay – Challenger 80 – 32S/24Q/16D; Singles – Doubles	(Bolivia) Boris Arias (Bolivia) Federico Zeballos; 7–5, 6–2	(Argentina) Guido Andreozzi (Argentina) Guillermo Durán	(Switzerland) Rémy Bertola (Italy) Luciano Darderi	(Argentina) Facundo Mena (France) Alexandre Müller (Argentina) Facundo Bagnis (Argentina) Facundo Juárez
October 3	Gwangju Open; Gwangju, South Korea; Hard – Challenger 80 – 32S/24Q/16D; Singles – Doubles	(Hungary) Zsombor Piros; 6–2, 6–4	(Ecuador) Emilio Gómez	(Australia) Marc Polmans (United States) Christopher Eubanks	(South Korea) Nam Ji-sung (Austria) Maximilian Neuchrist (Germany) Maximilian Marterer (Australia) Rinky Hijikata
October 3	Gwangju Open; Gwangju, South Korea; Hard – Challenger 80 – 32S/24Q/16D; Singles – Doubles	(Colombia) Nicolás Barrientos (Mexico) Miguel Ángel Reyes-Varela; 2–6, 6–3, [10–6]	(India) Yuki Bhambri (India) Saketh Myneni	(Australia) Marc Polmans (United States) Christopher Eubanks	(South Korea) Nam Ji-sung (Austria) Maximilian Neuchrist (Germany) Maximilian Marterer (Australia) Rinky Hijikata
October 3	Tiburon Challenger; Tiburon, United States; Hard – Challenger 80 – 32S/24Q/16D; Singles – Doubles	(United States) Zachary Svajda; 2–6, 6–2, 6–4	(United States) Ben Shelton	(United States) Denis Kudla (Canada) Alexis Galarneau	(France) Enzo Couacaud (United States) Mitchell Krueger (United States) Ernesto Escobedo (United Kingdom) Paul Jubb
October 3	Tiburon Challenger; Tiburon, United States; Hard – Challenger 80 – 32S/24Q/16D; Singles – Doubles	(Switzerland) Leandro Riedi (Monaco) Valentin Vacherot; 6–7^{(2–7)}, 6–3, [10–2]	(United States) Ezekiel Clark (United States) Alfredo Perez	(United States) Denis Kudla (Canada) Alexis Galarneau	(France) Enzo Couacaud (United States) Mitchell Krueger (United States) Ernesto Escobedo (United Kingdom) Paul Jubb
October 10	Seoul Open Challenger; Seoul, South Korea; Hard – Challenger 110 – 32S/24Q/16D; Singles – Doubles	(Australia) Li Tu; 7–6^{(7–5)}, 6–4	(China) Wu Yibing	(Poland) Kamil Majchrzak (Australia) James Duckworth	(Czech Republic) Dalibor Svrčina (Japan) Shintaro Mochizuki (Australia) Christopher O'Connell (Germany) Maximilian Marterer
October 10	Seoul Open Challenger; Seoul, South Korea; Hard – Challenger 110 – 32S/24Q/16D; Singles – Doubles	(Japan) Kaichi Uchida (Chinese Taipei) Wu Tung-lin; 6–7^{(2–7)}, 7–5, [11–9]	(South Korea) Chung Yun-seong (United States) Aleksandar Kovacevic	(Poland) Kamil Majchrzak (Australia) James Duckworth	(Czech Republic) Dalibor Svrčina (Japan) Shintaro Mochizuki (Australia) Christopher O'Connell (Germany) Maximilian Marterer
October 10	Saint-Tropez Open; Saint-Tropez, France; Hard – Challenger 100 – 32S/24Q/16D; Singles – Doubles	(Italy) Mattia Bellucci; 6–3, 6–3	(Italy) Matteo Arnaldi	(France) Ugo Humbert (Austria) Jurij Rodionov	(France) Grégoire Barrère (France) Valentin Royer (Italy) Roberto Marcora (Italy) Salvatore Caruso
October 10	Saint-Tropez Open; Saint-Tropez, France; Hard – Challenger 100 – 32S/24Q/16D; Singles – Doubles	(France) Dan Added (France) Albano Olivetti; 6–3, 3–6, [12–10]	(Monaco) Romain Arneodo (Austria) Tristan-Samuel Weissborn	(France) Ugo Humbert (Austria) Jurij Rodionov	(France) Grégoire Barrère (France) Valentin Royer (Italy) Roberto Marcora (Italy) Salvatore Caruso
October 10	Fairfield Challenger; Fairfield, United States; Hard – Challenger 80 – 32S/24Q/16D; Singles – Doubles	(United States) Michael Mmoh; 6–3, 6–2	(Canada) Gabriel Diallo	(United States) Alafia Ayeni (United States) Sam Riffice	(United States) Tennys Sandgren (France) Enzo Couacaud (China) Shang Juncheng (Canada) Alexis Galarneau
October 10	Fairfield Challenger; Fairfield, United States; Hard – Challenger 80 – 32S/24Q/16D; Singles – Doubles	(United Kingdom) Julian Cash (United Kingdom) Henry Patten; 6–3, 6–1	(India) Anirudh Chandrasekar (India) Vijay Sundar Prashanth	(United States) Alafia Ayeni (United States) Sam Riffice	(United States) Tennys Sandgren (France) Enzo Couacaud (China) Shang Juncheng (Canada) Alexis Galarneau
October 10	Wolffkran Open; Ismaning, Germany; Carpet (i) – Challenger 80 – 32S/24Q/16D; Singles – Doubles	(France) Quentin Halys; 7–6^{(8–6)}, 6–3	(Germany) Max Hans Rehberg	(Poland) Kacper Żuk (Canada) Vasek Pospisil	(United Kingdom) Alastair Gray (Kazakhstan) Denis Yevseyev (Ukraine) Vitaliy Sachko (Germany) Elmar Ejupovic
October 10	Wolffkran Open; Ismaning, Germany; Carpet (i) – Challenger 80 – 32S/24Q/16D; Singles – Doubles	(Belgium) Michael Geerts (Finland) Patrik Niklas-Salminen; 7–6^{(7–5)}, 7–6^{(10–8)}	(Germany) Fabian Fallert (Germany) Hendrik Jebens	(Poland) Kacper Żuk (Canada) Vasek Pospisil	(United Kingdom) Alastair Gray (Kazakhstan) Denis Yevseyev (Ukraine) Vitaliy Sachko (Germany) Elmar Ejupovic
October 10	Challenger Rio de Janeiro; Rio de Janeiro, Brazil; Clay – Challenger 80 – 32S/24Q/16D; Singles – Doubles	(Italy) Marco Cecchinato; 4–6, 6–4, 6–3	(Germany) Yannick Hanfmann	(Argentina) Federico Coria (France) Alexandre Müller	(Argentina) Juan Manuel Cerúndolo (Brazil) Matheus Pucinelli de Almeida (Italy) Luciano Darderi (Peru) Juan Pablo Varillas
October 10	Challenger Rio de Janeiro; Rio de Janeiro, Brazil; Clay – Challenger 80 – 32S/24Q/16D; Singles – Doubles	(Argentina) Guido Andreozzi (Argentina) Guillermo Durán; 6–3, 6–2	(Poland) Karol Drzewiecki (Switzerland) Jakub Paul	(Argentina) Federico Coria (France) Alexandre Müller	(Argentina) Juan Manuel Cerúndolo (Brazil) Matheus Pucinelli de Almeida (Italy) Luciano Darderi (Peru) Juan Pablo Varillas
October 17	Busan Open; Busan, South Korea; Hard – Challenger 125 – 32S/24Q/16D; Singles – Doubles	(Poland) Kamil Majchrzak; 6–4, 3–6, 6–2	(Moldova) Radu Albot	(Australia) Christopher O'Connell (South Korea) Hong Seong-chan	(South Korea) Kwon Soon-woo (United States) Christopher Eubanks (Australia) John Millman (Australia) Marc Polmans
October 17	Busan Open; Busan, South Korea; Hard – Challenger 125 – 32S/24Q/16D; Singles – Doubles	(Australia) Marc Polmans (Australia) Max Purcell; 6–7^{(5–7)}, 6–2, [12–10]	(South Korea) Nam Ji-sung (South Korea) Song Min-kyu	(Australia) Christopher O'Connell (South Korea) Hong Seong-chan	(South Korea) Kwon Soon-woo (United States) Christopher Eubanks (Australia) John Millman (Australia) Marc Polmans
October 17	Ambato La Gran Ciudad; Ambato, Ecuador; Clay – Challenger 80 – 32S/24Q/16D; Singles – Doubles	(Argentina) Facundo Bagnis; 7–6^{(9–7)}, 6–4	(Brazil) João Lucas Reis da Silva	(Peru) Juan Pablo Varillas (Argentina) Thiago Agustín Tirante	(Colombia) Nicolás Mejía (Serbia) Miljan Zekić (Argentina) Facundo Mena (Argentina) Santiago Rodríguez Taverna
October 17	Ambato La Gran Ciudad; Ambato, Ecuador; Clay – Challenger 80 – 32S/24Q/16D; Singles – Doubles	(Argentina) Santiago Rodríguez Taverna (Argentina) Thiago Agustín Tirante; 7–6^{(13–11)}, 6–3	(Zimbabwe) Benjamin Lock (Zimbabwe) Courtney John Lock	(Peru) Juan Pablo Varillas (Argentina) Thiago Agustín Tirante	(Colombia) Nicolás Mejía (Serbia) Miljan Zekić (Argentina) Facundo Mena (Argentina) Santiago Rodríguez Taverna
October 17	Challenger Coquimbo II; Coquimbo, Chile; Clay – Challenger 80 – 32S/24Q/16D; Singles – Doubles	(Argentina) Juan Manuel Cerúndolo; 6–3, 3–6, 6–4	(Argentina) Facundo Díaz Acosta	(Kazakhstan) Timofey Skatov (Italy) Franco Agamenone	(Argentina) Federico Coria (Italy) Marco Cecchinato (Argentina) Andrea Collarini (Argentina) Tomás Martín Etcheverry
October 17	Challenger Coquimbo II; Coquimbo, Chile; Clay – Challenger 80 – 32S/24Q/16D; Singles – Doubles	(Italy) Franco Agamenone (Argentina) Hernán Casanova; 6–3, 6–4	(Poland) Karol Drzewiecki (Switzerland) Jakub Paul	(Kazakhstan) Timofey Skatov (Italy) Franco Agamenone	(Argentina) Federico Coria (Italy) Marco Cecchinato (Argentina) Andrea Collarini (Argentina) Tomás Martín Etcheverry
October 17	Hamburg Ladies & Gents Cup; Hamburg, Germany; Hard (i) – Challenger 80 – 32S/24Q/16D; Singles – Doubles	(Switzerland) Alexander Ritschard; 7–5, 6–5 ret.	(Switzerland) Henri Laaksonen	(Netherlands) Robin Haase (France) Matteo Martineau	(France) Grégoire Barrère (Germany) Julian Lenz (Czech Republic) Jonáš Forejtek (Netherlands) Jelle Sels
October 17	Hamburg Ladies & Gents Cup; Hamburg, Germany; Hard (i) – Challenger 80 – 32S/24Q/16D; Singles – Doubles	(Philippines) Treat Huey (United States) Max Schnur; 7–6^{(8–6)}, 6–4	(Jamaica) Dustin Brown (Germany) Julian Lenz	(Netherlands) Robin Haase (France) Matteo Martineau	(France) Grégoire Barrère (Germany) Julian Lenz (Czech Republic) Jonáš Forejtek (Netherlands) Jelle Sels
October 17	Vilnius Open; Vilnius, Lithuania; Hard (i) – Challenger 80 – 32S/24Q/16D; Singles – Doubles	(Italy) Mattia Bellucci; 1–6, 6–3, 7–5	(Turkey) Cem İlkel	(Norway) Viktor Durasovic (France) Dan Added	(France) Antoine Escoffier (Czech Republic) Zdeněk Kolář (France) Laurent Lokoli (Slovakia) Lukáš Klein
October 17	Vilnius Open; Vilnius, Lithuania; Hard (i) – Challenger 80 – 32S/24Q/16D; Singles – Doubles	(Monaco) Romain Arneodo (Austria) Tristan-Samuel Weissborn; 6–4, 5–7, [10–5]	(France) Dan Added (France) Théo Arribagé	(Norway) Viktor Durasovic (France) Dan Added	(France) Antoine Escoffier (Czech Republic) Zdeněk Kolář (France) Laurent Lokoli (Slovakia) Lukáš Klein
October 24	Brest Challenger; Brest, France; Hard (i) – Challenger 90 – 32S/24Q/16D; Singles – Doubles	(France) Grégoire Barrère; 6–3, 6–3	(France) Luca Van Assche	(France) Mathias Bourgue; Evgeny Donskoy	(Netherlands) Jelle Sels (France) Gilles Simon (France) Manuel Guinard (France) Geoffrey Blancaneaux
October 24	Brest Challenger; Brest, France; Hard (i) – Challenger 90 – 32S/24Q/16D; Singles – Doubles	(Norway) Viktor Durasovic (Finland) Otto Virtanen; 6–4, 6–4	(Sweden) Filip Bergevi (Greece) Petros Tsitsipas	(France) Mathias Bourgue; Evgeny Donskoy	(Netherlands) Jelle Sels (France) Gilles Simon (France) Manuel Guinard (France) Geoffrey Blancaneaux
October 24	Las Vegas Challenger; Las Vegas, United States; Hard – Challenger 80 – 32S/24Q/16D; Singles – Doubles	(United States) Tennys Sandgren; 7–5, 6–3	(United States) Stefan Kozlov	(China) Shang Juncheng (United States) Steve Johnson	(United States) Ernesto Escobedo (United States) Brandon Holt (Canada) Alexis Galarneau (Argentina) Juan Pablo Ficovich
October 24	Las Vegas Challenger; Las Vegas, United States; Hard – Challenger 80 – 32S/24Q/16D; Singles – Doubles	(United Kingdom) Julian Cash (United Kingdom) Henry Patten; 6–4, 7–6^{(7–1)}	(Germany) Constantin Frantzen (United States) Reese Stalder	(China) Shang Juncheng (United States) Steve Johnson	(United States) Ernesto Escobedo (United States) Brandon Holt (Canada) Alexis Galarneau (Argentina) Juan Pablo Ficovich
October 24	Lima Challenger II; Lima, Peru; Clay – Challenger 80 – 32S/24Q/16D; Singles – Doubles	(Germany) Daniel Altmaier; 6–1, 6–7^{(4–7)}, 6–4	(Argentina) Tomás Martín Etcheverry	(Argentina) Federico Coria (Argentina) Román Andrés Burruchaga	(France) Giovanni Mpetshi Perricard (Argentina) Santiago Rodríguez Taverna (Serbia) Nikola Milojević (Brazil) Felipe Meligeni Alves
October 24	Lima Challenger II; Lima, Peru; Clay – Challenger 80 – 32S/24Q/16D; Singles – Doubles	(Netherlands) Jesper de Jong (Netherlands) Max Houkes; 7–6^{(8–6)}, 3–6, [12–10]	(Argentina) Guido Andreozzi (Argentina) Guillermo Durán	(Argentina) Federico Coria (Argentina) Román Andrés Burruchaga	(France) Giovanni Mpetshi Perricard (Argentina) Santiago Rodríguez Taverna (Serbia) Nikola Milojević (Brazil) Felipe Meligeni Alves
October 24	Sparkassen ATP Challenger; Ortisei, Italy; Hard (i) – Challenger 80 – 32S/24Q/16D; Singles – Doubles	(Croatia) Borna Gojo; 7–6^{(7–4)}, 6–3	(Slovakia) Lukáš Klein	(Italy) Andrea Vavassori (Italy) Flavio Cobolli	(Czech Republic) Tomáš Macháč (Italy) Luca Nardi (Italy) Giulio Zeppieri (Czech Republic) Lukáš Rosol
October 24	Sparkassen ATP Challenger; Ortisei, Italy; Hard (i) – Challenger 80 – 32S/24Q/16D; Singles – Doubles	(Uzbekistan) Denis Istomin; Evgeny Karlovskiy; 6–3, 7–5	(Italy) Marco Bortolotti (Spain) Sergio Martos Gornés	(Italy) Andrea Vavassori (Italy) Flavio Cobolli	(Czech Republic) Tomáš Macháč (Italy) Luca Nardi (Italy) Giulio Zeppieri (Czech Republic) Lukáš Rosol
October 24	City of Playford Tennis International; Playford, Australia; Hard – Challenger 80 – 32S/24Q/16D; Singles – Doubles	(Australia) Rinky Hijikata; 6–1, 6–1	(Japan) Rio Noguchi	(Australia) Omar Jasika (Australia) Max Purcell	(Australia) Jordan Thompson (Australia) Dayne Kelly (Chinese Taipei) Hsu Yu-hsiou (Australia) James Duckworth
October 24	City of Playford Tennis International; Playford, Australia; Hard – Challenger 80 – 32S/24Q/16D; Singles – Doubles	(Australia) Jeremy Beale (Australia) Calum Puttergill; 7–6^{(7–2)}, 6–4	(Japan) Rio Noguchi (Japan) Yusuke Takahashi	(Australia) Omar Jasika (Australia) Max Purcell	(Australia) Jordan Thompson (Australia) Dayne Kelly (Chinese Taipei) Hsu Yu-hsiou (Australia) James Duckworth
October 31	Trofeo Faip–Perrel; Bergamo, Italy; Hard (i) – Challenger 80 – 32S/24Q/16D; Singles – Doubles	(Finland) Otto Virtanen; 6–2, 7–5	(Germany) Jan-Lennard Struff	(Austria) Jurij Rodionov (Portugal) Nuno Borges	(Germany) Yannick Hanfmann (Italy) Matteo Arnaldi (Switzerland) Dominic Stricker (Italy) Andrea Vavassori
October 31	Trofeo Faip–Perrel; Bergamo, Italy; Hard (i) – Challenger 80 – 32S/24Q/16D; Singles – Doubles	(Germany) Henri Squire (Germany) Jan-Lennard Struff; 6–4, 6–7^{(5–7)}, [10–7]	(France) Jonathan Eysseric (France) Albano Olivetti	(Austria) Jurij Rodionov (Portugal) Nuno Borges	(Germany) Yannick Hanfmann (Italy) Matteo Arnaldi (Switzerland) Dominic Stricker (Italy) Andrea Vavassori
October 31	Charlottesville Men's Pro Challenger; Charlottesville, United States; Hard (i) – Challenger 80 – 32S/24Q/16D; Singles – Doubles	(United States) Ben Shelton; 7–6^{(7–4)}, 7–5	(United States) Christopher Eubanks	(United States) Emilio Nava (United Kingdom) Paul Jubb	(United States) Denis Kudla (China) Shang Juncheng (Germany) Lucas Gerch (Spain) Iñaki Montes de la Torre
October 31	Charlottesville Men's Pro Challenger; Charlottesville, United States; Hard (i) – Challenger 80 – 32S/24Q/16D; Singles – Doubles	(United Kingdom) Julian Cash (United Kingdom) Henry Patten; 6–2, 6–4	(United States) Alex Lawson (New Zealand) Artem Sitak	(United States) Emilio Nava (United Kingdom) Paul Jubb	(United States) Denis Kudla (China) Shang Juncheng (Germany) Lucas Gerch (Spain) Iñaki Montes de la Torre
October 31	Challenger Ciudad de Guayaquil; Guayaquil, Ecuador; Clay – Challenger 80 – 32S/24Q/16D; Singles – Doubles	(Germany) Daniel Altmaier; 6–2, 6–4	(Argentina) Federico Coria	(Peru) Juan Pablo Varillas (Italy) Marco Cecchinato	(Brazil) Matheus Pucinelli de Almeida (Argentina) Nicolás Kicker (Netherlands) Jesper de Jong (United Kingdom) Jan Choinski
October 31	Challenger Ciudad de Guayaquil; Guayaquil, Ecuador; Clay – Challenger 80 – 32S/24Q/16D; Singles – Doubles	(Argentina) Guido Andreozzi (Argentina) Guillermo Durán; 6–0, 6–4	(Argentina) Facundo Díaz Acosta (Venezuela) Luis David Martínez	(Peru) Juan Pablo Varillas (Italy) Marco Cecchinato	(Brazil) Matheus Pucinelli de Almeida (Argentina) Nicolás Kicker (Netherlands) Jesper de Jong (United Kingdom) Jan Choinski
October 31	NSW Open; Sydney, Australia; Hard – Challenger 80 – 32S/24Q/16D; Singles – Doubles	(Chinese Taipei) Hsu Yu-hsiou; 6–4, 7–6^{(7–5)}	(Australia) Marc Polmans	(Australia) Max Purcell (Czech Republic) Marek Gengel	(Australia) Tristan Schoolkate (Australia) James McCabe (Australia) Adam Walton (United Kingdom) Mark Whitehouse
October 31	NSW Open; Sydney, Australia; Hard – Challenger 80 – 32S/24Q/16D; Singles – Doubles	(Australia) Blake Ellis (Australia) Tristan Schoolkate; 4–6, 7–5, [11–9]	(New Zealand) Ajeet Rai (Japan) Yuta Shimizu	(Australia) Max Purcell (Czech Republic) Marek Gengel	(Australia) Tristan Schoolkate (Australia) James McCabe (Australia) Adam Walton (United Kingdom) Mark Whitehouse
October 31	Keio Challenger; Yokohama, Japan; Hard – Challenger 80 – 32S/24Q/16D; Singles – Doubles	(Australia) Christopher O'Connell; 6–1, 6–7^{(5–7)}, 6–3	(Japan) Yosuke Watanuki	(Japan) Sho Shimabukuro (Croatia) Nino Serdarušić	(Chinese Taipei) Wu Tung-lin (Bosnia and Herzegovina) Damir Džumhur (Japan) Kaichi Uchida (Australia) John Millman
October 31	Keio Challenger; Yokohama, Japan; Hard – Challenger 80 – 32S/24Q/16D; Singles – Doubles	(Romania) Victor Vlad Cornea (Philippines) Ruben Gonzales; 7–5, 6–3	(Japan) Tomoya Fujiwara (Japan) Masamichi Imamura	(Japan) Sho Shimabukuro (Croatia) Nino Serdarušić	(Chinese Taipei) Wu Tung-lin (Bosnia and Herzegovina) Damir Džumhur (Japan) Kaichi Uchida (Australia) John Millman

=== November ===
Week of	Tournament	Champions	Runners-up	Semifinalists	Quarterfinalists
November 7	Open International de Tennis de Roanne; Roanne, France; Hard (i) – Challenger 100 – 32S/24Q/16D; Singles – Doubles	(France) Hugo Gaston; 6–7^{(6–8)}, 7–5, 6–1	(Switzerland) Henri Laaksonen	(Australia) Alexei Popyrin (Finland) Otto Virtanen	(France) Arthur Fils (France) Luca Van Assche; Pavel Kotov (Georgia (country)) Nikoloz Basilashvili
November 7	Open International de Tennis de Roanne; Roanne, France; Hard (i) – Challenger 100 – 32S/24Q/16D; Singles – Doubles	(France) Sadio Doumbia (France) Fabien Reboul; 7–6^{(7–5)}, 6–4	(Jamaica) Dustin Brown (Poland) Szymon Walków	(Australia) Alexei Popyrin (Finland) Otto Virtanen	(France) Arthur Fils (France) Luca Van Assche; Pavel Kotov (Georgia (country)) Nikoloz Basilashvili
November 7	Slovak Open; Bratislava, Slovakia; Hard (i) – Challenger 90 – 32S/24Q/16D; Singles – Doubles	(Hungary) Márton Fucsovics; 6–2, 6–4	(Hungary) Fábián Marozsán	(Turkey) Cem İlkel (Czech Republic) Tomáš Macháč	(Netherlands) Tim van Rijthoven (Slovakia) Norbert Gombos (Slovakia) Lukáš Klein (Germany) Maximilian Marterer
November 7	Slovak Open; Bratislava, Slovakia; Hard (i) – Challenger 90 – 32S/24Q/16D; Singles – Doubles	(Ukraine) Denys Molchanov (Kazakhstan) Aleksandr Nedovyesov; 4–6, 6–4, [10–6]	(Czech Republic) Petr Nouza (Czech Republic) Andrew Paulson	(Turkey) Cem İlkel (Czech Republic) Tomáš Macháč	(Netherlands) Tim van Rijthoven (Slovakia) Norbert Gombos (Slovakia) Lukáš Klein (Germany) Maximilian Marterer
November 7	Calgary National Bank Challenger; Calgary, Canada; Hard (i) – Challenger 80 – 32S/24Q/16D; Singles – Doubles	(Germany) Dominik Koepfer; 6–2, 6–4	(Australia) Aleksandar Vukic	(Canada) Gabriel Diallo (Poland) Maks Kaśnikowski	(France) Harold Mayot (France) Antoine Escoffier (Canada) Alexis Galarneau (Canada) Vasek Pospisil
November 7	Calgary National Bank Challenger; Calgary, Canada; Hard (i) – Challenger 80 – 32S/24Q/16D; Singles – Doubles	(Austria) Maximilian Neuchrist (Greece) Michail Pervolarakis; 6–4, 6–4	(Italy) Julian Ocleppo (Germany) Kai Wehnelt	(Canada) Gabriel Diallo (Poland) Maks Kaśnikowski	(France) Harold Mayot (France) Antoine Escoffier (Canada) Alexis Galarneau (Canada) Vasek Pospisil
November 7	Knoxville Challenger; Knoxville, United States; Hard (i) – Challenger 80 – 32S/24Q/16D; Singles – Doubles	(United States) Ben Shelton; 6–3, 1–6, 7–6^{(7–4)}	(United States) Christopher Eubanks	(United States) Michael Mmoh (France) Enzo Couacaud	(United States) Tennys Sandgren (Germany) Lucas Gerch (United States) Aleksandar Kovacevic (United States) Stefan Kozlov
November 7	Knoxville Challenger; Knoxville, United States; Hard (i) – Challenger 80 – 32S/24Q/16D; Singles – Doubles	(United States) Hunter Reese (United States) Tennys Sandgren; 6–7^{(4–7)}, 7–6^{(7–3)}, [10–5]	(United States) Martin Damm (United States) Mitchell Krueger	(United States) Michael Mmoh (France) Enzo Couacaud	(United States) Tennys Sandgren (Germany) Lucas Gerch (United States) Aleksandar Kovacevic (United States) Stefan Kozlov
November 7	Matsuyama Challenger; Matsuyama, Japan; Hard – Challenger 80 – 32S/24Q/16D; Singles – Doubles	(South Korea) Hong Seong-chan; 6–3, 6–2	(Chinese Taipei) Wu Tung-lin	(Vietnam) Lý Hoàng Nam (Japan) Shintaro Mochizuki	(Chinese Taipei) Hsu Yu-hsiou (Japan) Kaichi Uchida (Romania) Nicholas David Ionel (Chinese Taipei) Jason Jung
November 7	Matsuyama Challenger; Matsuyama, Japan; Hard – Challenger 80 – 32S/24Q/16D; Singles – Doubles	(Australia) Andrew Harris (Australia) John-Patrick Smith; 6–3, 4–6, [10–8]	(Japan) Toshihide Matsui (Japan) Kaito Uesugi	(Vietnam) Lý Hoàng Nam (Japan) Shintaro Mochizuki	(Chinese Taipei) Hsu Yu-hsiou (Japan) Kaichi Uchida (Romania) Nicholas David Ionel (Chinese Taipei) Jason Jung
November 7	Uruguay Open; Montevideo, Uruguay; Clay – Challenger 80 – 32S/24Q/16D; Singles – Doubles	(Argentina) Genaro Alberto Olivieri; 6–7^{(3–7)}, 7–6^{(7–5)}, 6–3	(Argentina) Tomás Martín Etcheverry	(Italy) Franco Agamenone (Germany) Daniel Altmaier	(Argentina) Marco Trungelliti (Argentina) Facundo Bagnis (Argentina) Nicolás Kicker (Argentina) Facundo Díaz Acosta
November 7	Uruguay Open; Montevideo, Uruguay; Clay – Challenger 80 – 32S/24Q/16D; Singles – Doubles	(Poland) Karol Drzewiecki (Poland) Piotr Matuszewski; 6–4, 6–4	(Argentina) Facundo Díaz Acosta (Venezuela) Luis David Martínez	(Italy) Franco Agamenone (Germany) Daniel Altmaier	(Argentina) Marco Trungelliti (Argentina) Facundo Bagnis (Argentina) Nicolás Kicker (Argentina) Facundo Díaz Acosta
November 14	HPP Open; Helsinki, Finland; Hard (i) – Challenger 90 – 32S/24Q/16D; Singles – Doubles	(Switzerland) Leandro Riedi; 6–3, 6–1	(Czech Republic) Tomáš Macháč	(Netherlands) Jelle Sels (Germany) Yannick Hanfmann	(Bulgaria) Dimitar Kuzmanov (Bulgaria) Adrian Andreev (Belgium) Zizou Bergs (Kazakhstan) Mikhail Kukushkin
November 14	HPP Open; Helsinki, Finland; Hard (i) – Challenger 90 – 32S/24Q/16D; Singles – Doubles	(India) Purav Raja (India) Divij Sharan; 6–7^{(5–7)}, 6–3, [10–8]	(United States) Reese Stalder (Greece) Petros Tsitsipas	(Netherlands) Jelle Sels (Germany) Yannick Hanfmann	(Bulgaria) Dimitar Kuzmanov (Bulgaria) Adrian Andreev (Belgium) Zizou Bergs (Kazakhstan) Mikhail Kukushkin
November 14	Champaign–Urbana Challenger; Champaign, United States; Hard (i) – Challenger 80 – 32S/24Q/16D; Singles – Doubles	(United States) Ben Shelton; 0–6, 6–3, 6–2	(Australia) Aleksandar Vukic	(United States) Christopher Eubanks (United States) Aleksandar Kovacevic	(Spain) Nicolás Álvarez Varona (United States) Evan Zhu (India) Prajnesh Gunneswaran (United States) Steve Johnson
November 14	Champaign–Urbana Challenger; Champaign, United States; Hard (i) – Challenger 80 – 32S/24Q/16D; Singles – Doubles	(United States) Robert Galloway (Mexico) Hans Hach Verdugo; 3–6, 6–3, [10–5]	(United States) Ezekiel Clark (United States) Alfredo Perez	(United States) Christopher Eubanks (United States) Aleksandar Kovacevic	(Spain) Nicolás Álvarez Varona (United States) Evan Zhu (India) Prajnesh Gunneswaran (United States) Steve Johnson
November 14	Challenger Banque Nationale de Drummondville; Drummondville, Canada; Hard (i) – Challenger 80 – 32S/24Q/16D; Singles – Doubles	(Canada) Vasek Pospisil; 7–6^{(7–5)}, 4–6, 6–4	(United States) Michael Mmoh	(France) Antoine Escoffier (Belgium) Michael Geerts	(Tunisia) Aziz Dougaz (France) Harold Mayot (Canada) Alexis Galarneau (United Kingdom) Charles Broom
November 14	Challenger Banque Nationale de Drummondville; Drummondville, Canada; Hard (i) – Challenger 80 – 32S/24Q/16D; Singles – Doubles	(United Kingdom) Julian Cash (United Kingdom) Henry Patten; 6–3, 6–3	(United Kingdom) Arthur Fery (United Kingdom) Giles Hussey	(France) Antoine Escoffier (Belgium) Michael Geerts	(Tunisia) Aziz Dougaz (France) Harold Mayot (Canada) Alexis Galarneau (United Kingdom) Charles Broom
November 14	Kobe Challenger; Kobe, Japan; Hard (i) – Challenger 80 – 32S/24Q/16D; Singles – Doubles	(Japan) Yosuke Watanuki; 6–7^{(3–7)}, 7–5, 6–4	(Portugal) Frederico Ferreira Silva	(Australia) Christopher O'Connell (Croatia) Nino Serdarušić	(Australia) Marc Polmans (India) Ramkumar Ramanathan (Japan) Shinji Hazawa (Australia) John Millman
November 14	Kobe Challenger; Kobe, Japan; Hard (i) – Challenger 80 – 32S/24Q/16D; Singles – Doubles	(Japan) Shinji Hazawa (Japan) Yuta Shimizu; 6–4, 6–4	(Australia) Andrew Harris (Australia) John-Patrick Smith	(Australia) Christopher O'Connell (Croatia) Nino Serdarušić	(Australia) Marc Polmans (India) Ramkumar Ramanathan (Japan) Shinji Hazawa (Australia) John Millman
November 14	São Léo Open; São Leopoldo, Brazil; Clay – Challenger 80 – 32S/24Q/16D; Singles – Doubles	(Peru) Juan Pablo Varillas; 7–6^{(7–5)}, 4–6, 6–4	(Argentina) Facundo Bagnis	(Brazil) Felipe Meligeni Alves (Brazil) Thiago Seyboth Wild	(Brazil) João Fonseca (Argentina) Román Andrés Burruchaga (Brazil) João Lucas Reis da Silva (Brazil) Daniel Dutra da Silva
November 14	São Léo Open; São Leopoldo, Brazil; Clay – Challenger 80 – 32S/24Q/16D; Singles – Doubles	(Argentina) Guido Andreozzi (Argentina) Guillermo Durán; 5–1 ret.	(Brazil) Felipe Meligeni Alves (Brazil) João Lucas Reis da Silva	(Brazil) Felipe Meligeni Alves (Brazil) Thiago Seyboth Wild	(Brazil) João Fonseca (Argentina) Román Andrés Burruchaga (Brazil) João Lucas Reis da Silva (Brazil) Daniel Dutra da Silva
November 21	Challenger Temuco; Temuco, Chile; Hard – Challenger 100 – 32S/24Q/16D; Singles – Doubles	(Argentina) Guido Andreozzi; 4–6, 6–4, 6–2	(Argentina) Nicolás Kicker	(Colombia) Nicolás Mejía (Ecuador) Emilio Gómez	(Argentina) Facundo Bagnis (Dominican Republic) Nick Hardt (Argentina) Juan Bautista Otegui (Argentina) Renzo Olivo
November 21	Challenger Temuco; Temuco, Chile; Hard – Challenger 100 – 32S/24Q/16D; Singles – Doubles	(Argentina) Guido Andreozzi (Argentina) Guillermo Durán; 6–4, 6–2	(Venezuela) Luis David Martínez (India) Jeevan Nedunchezhiyan	(Colombia) Nicolás Mejía (Ecuador) Emilio Gómez	(Argentina) Facundo Bagnis (Dominican Republic) Nick Hardt (Argentina) Juan Bautista Otegui (Argentina) Renzo Olivo
November 21	Copa Faulcombridge; Valencia, Spain; Clay – Challenger 90 – 32S/24Q/16D; Singles – Doubles	(Ukraine) Oleksii Krutykh; 6–2, 6–0	(France) Luca Van Assche	(Serbia) Nikola Milojević (Spain) Pablo Llamas Ruiz	(Bulgaria) Adrian Andreev (Italy) Andrea Pellegrino (Spain) Carlos López Montagud (Spain) Javier Barranco Cosano
November 21	Copa Faulcombridge; Valencia, Spain; Clay – Challenger 90 – 32S/24Q/16D; Singles – Doubles	(Ukraine) Oleksii Krutykh (Spain) Oriol Roca Batalla; 6–3, 7–6^{(7–3)}	(Serbia) Ivan Sabanov (Serbia) Matej Sabanov	(Serbia) Nikola Milojević (Spain) Pablo Llamas Ruiz	(Bulgaria) Adrian Andreev (Italy) Andrea Pellegrino (Spain) Carlos López Montagud (Spain) Javier Barranco Cosano
November 21	Internazionali di Tennis Castel del Monte; Andria, Italy; Hard (i) – Challenger 80 – 32S/24Q/16D; Singles – Doubles	(Switzerland) Leandro Riedi; 7–6^{(7–4)}, 6–3	(Kazakhstan) Mikhail Kukushkin	(Hungary) Márton Fucsovics (Ukraine) Vitaliy Sachko	(Italy) Stefano Travaglia (Austria) Jurij Rodionov (Czech Republic) Tomáš Macháč; Evgeny Karlovskiy
November 21	Internazionali di Tennis Castel del Monte; Andria, Italy; Hard (i) – Challenger 80 – 32S/24Q/16D; Singles – Doubles	(United Kingdom) Julian Cash (United Kingdom) Henry Patten; 6–7^{(3–7)}, 6–4, [10–4]	(Italy) Francesco Forti (Italy) Marcello Serafini	(Hungary) Márton Fucsovics (Ukraine) Vitaliy Sachko	(Italy) Stefano Travaglia (Austria) Jurij Rodionov (Czech Republic) Tomáš Macháč; Evgeny Karlovskiy
November 21	Yokkaichi Challenger; Yokkaichi, Japan; Hard – Challenger 80 – 32S/24Q/16D; Singles – Doubles	(Japan) Yosuke Watanuki; 6–2, 6–2	(Portugal) Frederico Ferreira Silva	(Japan) Kaichi Uchida (Australia) James Duckworth	(Japan) Sho Shimabukuro (Northern Mariana Islands) Colin Sinclair (South Korea) Chung Yun-seong (Romania) Nicholas David Ionel
November 21	Yokkaichi Challenger; Yokkaichi, Japan; Hard – Challenger 80 – 32S/24Q/16D; Singles – Doubles	(Chinese Taipei) Hsu Yu-hsiou (Japan) Yuta Shimizu; 7–6^{(7–2)}, 6–4	(Japan) Masamichi Imamura (Japan) Rio Noguchi	(Japan) Kaichi Uchida (Australia) James Duckworth	(Japan) Sho Shimabukuro (Northern Mariana Islands) Colin Sinclair (South Korea) Chung Yun-seong (Romania) Nicholas David Ionel
November 28	Maia Challenger; Maia, Portugal; Clay (i) – Challenger 80 – 32S/24Q/16D; Singles – Doubles	(France) Luca Van Assche; 3–6, 6–4, 6–0	(Austria) Maximilian Neuchrist	(Portugal) Nuno Borges (Australia) Aleksandar Vukic	(Italy) Riccardo Bonadio (United Kingdom) Jan Choinski; Ivan Gakhov (Austria) Jurij Rodionov
November 28	Maia Challenger; Maia, Portugal; Clay (i) – Challenger 80 – 32S/24Q/16D; Singles – Doubles	(United Kingdom) Julian Cash (United Kingdom) Henry Patten; 6–3, 3–6, [10–8]	(Portugal) Nuno Borges (Portugal) Francisco Cabral	(Portugal) Nuno Borges (Australia) Aleksandar Vukic	(Italy) Riccardo Bonadio (United Kingdom) Jan Choinski; Ivan Gakhov (Austria) Jurij Rodionov
November 28	Maspalomas Challenger; Maspalomas, Spain; Clay – Challenger 80 – 32S/24Q/16D; Singles – Doubles	(Serbia) Dušan Lajović; 6–1, 6–4	(Canada) Steven Diez	(Spain) Pablo Llamas Ruiz (Spain) Oriol Roca Batalla	(Bulgaria) Adrian Andreev (Italy) Lorenzo Giustino (Czech Republic) Vít Kopřiva (Italy) Gian Marco Moroni
November 28	Maspalomas Challenger; Maspalomas, Spain; Clay – Challenger 80 – 32S/24Q/16D; Singles – Doubles	(United States) Evan King (United States) Reese Stalder; 6–3, 5–7, [11–9]	(Italy) Marco Bortolotti (Spain) Sergio Martos Gornés	(Spain) Pablo Llamas Ruiz (Spain) Oriol Roca Batalla	(Bulgaria) Adrian Andreev (Italy) Lorenzo Giustino (Czech Republic) Vít Kopřiva (Italy) Gian Marco Moroni

== Cancelled tournaments ==
The following tournaments were formally announced by the ATP before being cancelled.

Week of	Tournament
January 31	Bayamón Challenger; Bayamón, Puerto Rico; Hard – Challenger 80
February 7	Bayamón Challenger II; Bayamón, Puerto Rico; Hard – Challenger 80
February 28	Moscow Cup; Moscow, Russia; Carpet (i) – Challenger 80
March 14	Potchefstroom Open; Potchefstroom, South Africa; Hard – Challenger 80
March 21	Potchefstroom Open II; Potchefstroom, South Africa; Hard – Challenger 80
April 18	Villeneuve-Loubet Challenger; Villeneuve-Loubet, France; Clay – Challenger 80
July 11	Zagreb Open II; Zagreb, Croatia; Clay – Challenger 80
August 8	Nordic Naturals Challenger; Aptos, United States; Hard – Challenger 80
August 15	Quito Challenger; Quito, Ecuador; Clay – Challenger 80
November 28	Kiskút Open; Székesfehérvár, Hungary; Clay (i) – Challenger 50

== Statistical information ==
These tables present the number of singles (S) and doubles (D) titles won by each player and each nation during the season. The players/nations are sorted by: 1) total number of titles (a doubles title won by two players representing the same nation counts as only one win for the nation); 2) a singles > doubles hierarchy; 3) alphabetical order (by family names for players).

To avoid confusion and double counting, these tables should be updated only after an event is completed.

=== Titles won by player ===
Total	Player	S	D	S	D
10	Julian Cash (GBR)		● ● ● ● ● ● ● ● ● ●	0	10
10	Henry Patten (GBR)		● ● ● ● ● ● ● ● ● ●	0	10
9	Guillermo Durán (ARG)		● ● ● ● ● ● ● ● ●	0	9
8	Guido Andreozzi (ARG)	●	● ● ● ● ● ● ●	1	7
7	Albano Olivetti (FRA)		● ● ● ● ● ● ●	0	7
6	Nicolás Barrientos (COL)		● ● ● ● ● ●	0	6
6	Saketh Myneni (IND)		● ● ● ● ● ●	0	6
6	Miguel Ángel Reyes-Varela (MEX)		● ● ● ● ● ●	0	6
6	Cristian Rodríguez (COL)		● ● ● ● ● ●	0	6
5	Yuki Bhambri (IND)		● ● ● ● ●	0	5
5	Sadio Doumbia (FRA)		● ● ● ● ●	0	5
5	Alexander Erler (AUT)		● ● ● ● ●	0	5
5	Diego Hidalgo (ECU)		● ● ● ● ●	0	5
5	David Pel (NED)		● ● ● ● ●	0	5
5	Fabien Reboul (FRA)		● ● ● ● ●	0	5
5	Andrea Vavassori (ITA)		● ● ● ● ●	0	5
4	Pedro Cachin (ARG)	● ● ● ●		4	0
4	Jack Draper (GBR)	● ● ● ●		4	0
4	Quentin Halys (FRA)	● ● ●	●	3	1
4	Nuno Borges (POR)	●	● ● ●	1	3
4	Dustin Brown (JAM)		● ● ● ●	0	4
4	Francisco Cabral (POR)		● ● ● ●	0	4
4	Victor Vlad Cornea (ROU)		● ● ● ●	0	4
4	Robin Haase (NED)		● ● ● ●	0	4
4	Zdeněk Kolář (CZE)		● ● ● ●	0	4
4	Lucas Miedler (AUT)		● ● ● ●	0	4
3	Daniel Altmaier (GER)	● ● ●		3	0
3	Constant Lestienne (FRA)	● ● ●		3	0
3	Luca Nardi (ITA)	● ● ●		3	0
3	Ben Shelton (USA)	● ● ●		3	0
3	Wu Yibing (CHN)	● ● ●		3	0
3	Francisco Comesaña (ARG)	● ●	●	2	1
3	Oleksii Krutykh (UKR)	● ●	●	2	1
3	Leandro Riedi (SUI)	● ●	●	2	1
3	Franco Agamenone (ITA)	●	● ●	1	2
3	Manuel Guinard (FRA)	●	● ●	1	2
3	Santiago Rodríguez Taverna (ARG)	●	● ●	1	2
3	Tennys Sandgren (USA)	●	● ●	1	2
3	Jan-Lennard Struff (GER)	●	● ●	1	2
3	Dan Added (FRA)		● ● ●	0	3
3	Sander Arends (NED)		● ● ●	0	3
3	Ruben Bemelmans (BEL)		● ● ●	0	3
3	Marco Bortolotti (ITA)		● ● ●	0	3
3	Hernán Casanova (ARG)		● ● ●	0	3
3	Luciano Darderi (ITA)		● ● ●	0	3
3	Jesper de Jong (NED)		● ● ●	0	3
3	Jonathan Eysseric (FRA)		● ● ●	0	3
3	Ruben Gonzales (PHI)		● ● ●	0	3
3	Hans Hach Verdugo (MEX)		● ● ●	0	3
3	Andrew Harris (AUS)		● ● ●	0	3
3	Treat Huey (PHI)		● ● ●	0	3
3	Nathaniel Lammons (USA)		● ● ●	0	3
3	Daniel Masur (GER)		● ● ●	0	3
3	Philipp Oswald (AUT)		● ● ●	0	3
3	Adam Pavlásek (CZE)		● ● ●	0	3
3	Hunter Reese (USA)		● ● ●	0	3
3	Oriol Roca Batalla (ESP)		● ● ●	0	3
3	Yuta Shimizu (JPN)		● ● ●	0	3
3	David Vega Hernández (ESP)		● ● ●	0	3
3	Szymon Walków (POL)		● ● ●	0	3
3	Jackson Withrow (USA)		● ● ●	0	3
2	Facundo Bagnis (ARG)	● ●		2	0
2	Grégoire Barrère (FRA)	● ●		2	0
2	Mattia Bellucci (ITA)	● ●		2	0
2	Benjamin Bonzi (FRA)	● ●		2	0
2	Roberto Carballés Baena (ESP)	● ●		2	0
2	Marco Cecchinato (ITA)	● ●		2	0
2	Juan Manuel Cerúndolo (ARG)	● ●		2	0
2	Gastão Elias (POR)	● ●		2	0
2	Daniel Elahi Galán (COL)	● ●		2	0
2	Emilio Gómez (ECU)	● ●		2	0
2	Hugo Grenier (FRA)	● ●		2	0
2	Marc-Andrea Hüsler (SUI)	● ●		2	0
2	Lukáš Klein (SVK)	● ●		2	0
2	Pavel Kotov (Note: As of 1 March 2022, the ATP announced that players from Russia and Belarus will not compete under the name or flag of Russia or Belarus due to the Russian invasion of Ukraine)	● ●		2	0
2	Tomáš Macháč (CZE)	● ●		2	0
2	Michael Mmoh (USA)	● ●		2	0
2	Thiago Monteiro (BRA)	● ●		2	0
2	Corentin Moutet (FRA)	● ●		2	0
2	Jaume Munar (ESP)	● ●		2	0
2	Christopher O'Connell (AUS)	● ●		2	0
2	Zsombor Piros (HUN)	● ●		2	0
2	Vasek Pospisil (CAN)	● ●		2	0
2	Jurij Rodionov (AUT)	● ●		2	0
2	Roman Safiullin	● ●		2	0
2	Dominic Stricker (SUI)	● ●		2	0
2	Jordan Thompson (AUS)	● ●		2	0
2	Tseng Chun-hsin (TPE)	● ●		2	0
2	Camilo Ugo Carabelli (ARG)	● ●		2	0
2	Yosuke Watanuki (JPN)	● ●		2	0
2	Antoine Bellier (SUI)	●	●	1	1
2	Altuğ Çelikbilek (TUR)	●	●	1	1
2	Facundo Díaz Acosta (ARG)	●	●	1	1
2	Hsu Yu-hsiou (TPE)	●	●	1	1
2	Vít Kopřiva (CZE)	●	●	1	1
2	Denis Kudla (USA)	●	●	1	1
2	Felipe Meligeni Alves (BRA)	●	●	1	1
2	Facundo Mena (ARG)	●	●	1	1
2	Alexandre Müller (FRA)	●	●	1	1
2	Kaichi Uchida (JPN)	●	●	1	1
2	Valentin Vacherot (MON)	●	●	1	1
2	Otto Virtanen (FIN)	●	●	1	1
2	Wu Tung-lin (TPE)	●	●	1	1
2	Boris Arias (BOL)		● ●	0	2
2	Romain Arneodo (MON)		● ●	0	2
2	Sriram Balaji (IND)		● ●	0	2
2	Geoffrey Blancaneaux (FRA)		● ●	0	2
2	Íñigo Cervantes (ESP)		● ●	0	2
2	Chung Yun-seong (KOR)		● ●	0	2
2	Viktor Durasovic (NOR)		● ●	0	2
2	Fabian Fallert (GER)		● ●	0	2
2	Robert Galloway (USA)		● ●	0	2
2	Michael Geerts (BEL)		● ●	0	2
2	André Göransson (SWE)		● ●	0	2
2	Christian Harrison (USA)		● ●	0	2
2	Conner Huertas del Pino (PER)		● ●	0	2
2	Malek Jaziri (TUN)		● ●	0	2
2	Arjun Kadhe (IND)		● ●	0	2
2	Evgeny Karlovskiy		● ●	0	2
2	Evan King (USA)		● ●	0	2
2	Vladyslav Manafov (UKR)		● ●	0	2
2	Luis David Martínez (VEN)		● ●	0	2
2	Ben McLachlan (JPN)		● ●	0	2
2	Nicolás Mejía (COL)		● ●	0	2
2	Adrián Menéndez Maceiras (ESP)		● ●	0	2
2	Jeevan Nedunchezhiyan (IND)		● ●	0	2
2	Patrik Niklas-Salminen (FIN)		● ●	0	2
2	Renzo Olivo (ARG)		● ●	0	2
2	Michail Pervolarakis (GRE)		● ●	0	2
2	Oleg Prihodko (UKR)		● ●	0	2
2	Purav Raja (IND)		● ●	0	2
2	Fernando Romboli (BRA)		● ●	0	2
2	Max Schnur (USA)		● ●	0	2
2	Divij Sharan (IND)		● ●	0	2
2	Reese Stalder (USA)		● ●	0	2
2	Bart Stevens (NED)		● ●	0	2
2	Sem Verbeek (NED)		● ●	0	2
2	Federico Zeballos (BOL)		● ●	0	2
2	Igor Zelenay (SVK)		● ●	0	2
1	Radu Albot (MDA)	●		1	0
1	Matteo Arnaldi (ITA)	●		1	0
1	Zizou Bergs (BEL)	●		1	0
1	Raúl Brancaccio (ITA)	●		1	0
1	Arthur Cazaux (FRA)	●		1	0
1	Francisco Cerúndolo (ARG)	●		1	0
1	Jan Choinski (GBR)	●		1	0
1	Jay Clarke (GBR)	●		1	0
1	Flavio Cobolli (ITA)	●		1	0
1	Kimmer Coppejans (BEL)	●		1	0
1	Federico Coria (ARG)	●		1	0
1	Borna Ćorić (CRO)	●		1	0
1	Hugo Dellien (BOL)	●		1	0
1	Gabriel Diallo (CAN)	●		1	0
1	João Domingues (POR)	●		1	0
1	Ernesto Escobedo (USA)	●		1	0
1	Tomás Martín Etcheverry (ARG)	●		1	0
1	Dan Evans (GBR)	●		1	0
1	Nerman Fatić (BIH)	●		1	0
1	Juan Pablo Ficovich (ARG)	●		1	0
1	Sergey Fomin (UZB)	●		1	0
1	Márton Fucsovics (HUN)	●		1	0
1	Evan Furness (FRA)	●		1	0
1	Hugo Gaston (FRA)	●		1	0
1	Borna Gojo (CRO)	●		1	0
1	Tallon Griekspoor (NED)	●		1	0
1	Rinky Hijikata (AUS)	●		1	0
1	Hong Seong-chan (KOR)	●		1	0
1	Ugo Humbert (FRA)	●		1	0
1	Paul Jubb (GBR)	●		1	0
1	Nicolás Kicker (ARG)	●		1	0
1	Dominik Koepfer (GER)	●		1	0
1	Jozef Kovalík (SVK)	●		1	0
1	Jason Kubler (AUS)	●		1	0
1	Dušan Lajović (SRB)	●		1	0
1	Jiří Lehečka (CZE)	●		1	0
1	Francesco Maestrelli (ITA)	●		1	0
1	Gianluca Mager (ITA)	●		1	0
1	Kamil Majchrzak (POL)	●		1	0
1	Igor Marcondes (BRA)	●		1	0
1	Fábián Marozsán (HUN)	●		1	0
1	Hamad Međedović (SRB)	●		1	0
1	Filip Misolic (AUT)	●		1	0
1	Mats Moraing (GER)	●		1	0
1	Nicolas Moreno de Alboran (USA)	●		1	0
1	Lorenzo Musetti (ITA)	●		1	0
1	Emilio Nava (USA)	●		1	0
1	Yoshihito Nishioka (JPN)	●		1	0
1	Sebastian Ofner (AUT)	●		1	0
1	Genaro Alberto Olivieri (ARG)	●		1	0
1	Stuart Parker (GBR)	●		1	0
1	Francesco Passaro (ITA)	●		1	0
1	Andrea Pellegrino (ITA)	●		1	0
1	Alexei Popyrin (AUS)	●		1	0
1	Arthur Rinderknech (FRA)	●		1	0
1	Alexander Ritschard (SUI)	●		1	0
1	Holger Rune (DEN)	●		1	0
1	Jelle Sels (NED)	●		1	0
1	Shang Juncheng (CHN)	●		1	0
1	Alexander Shevchenko	●		1	0
1	Timofey Skatov (KAZ)	●		1	0
1	Jack Sock (USA)	●		1	0
1	Cedrik-Marcel Stebe (GER)	●		1	0
1	Zachary Svajda (USA)	●		1	0
1	Carlos Taberner (ESP)	●		1	0
1	Juan Bautista Torres (ARG)	●		1	0
1	Li Tu (AUS)	●		1	0
1	Luca Van Assche (FRA)	●		1	0
1	Juan Pablo Varillas (PER)	●		1	0
1	Fernando Verdasco (ESP)	●		1	0
1	Aleksandar Vukic (AUS)	●		1	0
1	Bernabé Zapata Miralles (ESP)	●		1	0
1	Zhang Zhizhen (CHN)	●		1	0
1	Nicolás Álvarez Varona (ESP)		●	0	1
1	JC Aragone (USA)		●	0	1
1	Jeremy Beale (AUS)		●	0	1
1	William Blumberg (USA)		●	0	1
1	Tomislav Brkić (BIH)		●	0	1
1	Gijs Brouwer (NED)		●	0	1
1	Román Andrés Burruchaga (ARG)		●	0	1
1	Nikola Ćaćić (SRB)		●	0	1
1	Ignacio Carou (URU)		●	0	1
1	Andrea Collarini (ARG)		●	0	1
1	Enzo Couacaud (FRA)		●	0	1
1	Gabriel Décamps (BRA)		●	0	1
1	Marcelo Demoliner (BRA)		●	0	1
1	Evgeny Donskoy		●	0	1
1	Titouan Droguet (FRA)		●	0	1
1	Karol Drzewiecki (POL)		●	0	1
1	Blake Ellis (AUS)		●	0	1
1	Sanjar Fayziev (UZB)		●	0	1
1	Billy Harris (GBR)		●	0	1
1	Shinji Hazawa (JPN)		●	0	1
1	Pierre-Hugues Herbert (FRA)		●	0	1
1	Max Houkes (NED)		●	0	1
1	Arklon Huertas del Pino (PER)		●	0	1
1	Denis Istomin (UZB)		●	0	1
1	Kyrian Jacquet (FRA)		●	0	1
1	Maxime Janvier (FRA)		●	0	1
1	Nicolás Jarry (CHI)		●	0	1
1	Roman Jebavý (CZE)		●	0	1
1	Alibek Kachmazov		●	0	1
1	Markos Kalovelonis (GRE)		●	0	1
1	Austin Krajicek (USA)		●	0	1
1	Benjamin Lock (ZIM)		●	0	1
1	Nicolas Mahut (FRA)		●	0	1
1	Sergio Martos Gornés (ESP)		●	0	1
1	Rafael Matos (BRA)		●	0	1
1	Piotr Matuszewski (POL)		●	0	1
1	Denys Molchanov (UKR)		●	0	1
1	Iñaki Montes de la Torre (ESP)		●	0	1
1	Nam Ji-sung (KOR)		●	0	1
1	Aleksandr Nedovyesov (KAZ)		●	0	1
1	Maximilian Neuchrist (AUT)		●	0	1
1	Hugo Nys (MON)		●	0	1
1	Neil Oberleitner (AUT)		●	0	1
1	Jonny O'Mara (GBR)		●	0	1
1	Gonçalo Oliveira (POR)		●	0	1
1	Andrew Paulson (CZE)		●	0	1
1	Marc Polmans (AUS)		●	0	1
1	Dmitry Popko (KAZ)		●	0	1
1	Jaroslav Pospíšil (CZE)		●	0	1
1	Matheus Pucinelli de Almeida (BRA)		●	0	1
1	Max Purcell (AUS)		●	0	1
1	Calum Puttergill (AUS)		●	0	1
1	Ajeet Rai (NZL)		●	0	1
1	Ramkumar Ramanathan (IND)		●	0	1
1	Édouard Roger-Vasselin (FRA)		●	0	1
1	Mats Rosenkranz (GER)		●	0	1
1	Ivan Sabanov (SRB)		●	0	1
1	Matej Sabanov (SRB)		●	0	1
1	Vitaliy Sachko (UKR)		●	0	1
1	Tristan Schoolkate (AUS)		●	0	1
1	Ken Skupski (GBR)		●	0	1
1	John-Patrick Smith (AUS)		●	0	1
1	Song Min-kyu (KOR)		●	0	1
1	Henri Squire (GER)		●	0	1
1	Kelsey Stevenson (CAN)		●	0	1
1	Thiago Agustín Tirante (ARG)		●	0	1
1	Evgenii Tiurnev		●	0	1
1	Mikael Torpegaard (DEN)		●	0	1
1	Andrés Urrea (COL)		●	0	1
1	Joran Vliegen (BEL)		●	0	1
1	Tristan-Samuel Weissborn (AUT)		●	0	1
1	Jan Zieliński (POL)		●	0	1

=== Titles won by nation ===
Total	Nation	S	D
46	France (FRA)	22	24
41	Argentina (ARG)	23	18
31	United States (USA)	12	19
29	Italy (ITA)	16	13
21	Great Britain (GBR)	9	12
17	Spain (ESP)	7	10
16	Colombia (COL)	2	14
15	Australia (AUS)	9	6
15	Germany (GER)	7	8
15	Netherlands (NED)	2	13
14	Austria (AUT)	4	10
13	Czech Republic (CZE)	4	9
12	India (IND)	0	12
11	Brazil (BRA)	4	7
10	Switzerland (SUI)	8	2
10	Japan (JPN)	4	6
9	Portugal (POR)	4	5
9	Mexico (MEX)	0	9
7	Belgium (BEL)	2	5
7	Ecuador (ECU)	2	5
7	Ukraine (UKR)	2	5
6	Chinese Taipei (TPE)	4	2
6	Poland (POL)	1	5
5	China (CHN)	5	0
5	Slovakia (SVK)	3	2
5	Monaco (MON)	1	4
5	Philippines (PHI)	0	5
4	Hungary (HUN)	4	0
4	Canada (CAN)	3	1
4	Serbia (SRB)	2	2
4	Finland (FIN)	1	3
4	South Korea (KOR)	1	3
4	Jamaica (JAM)	0	4
4	Romania (ROU)	0	4
3	Bolivia (BOL)	1	2
3	Kazakhstan (KAZ)	1	2
3	Peru (PER)	1	2
3	Uzbekistan (UZB)	1	2
3	Greece (GRE)	0	3
2	Croatia (CRO)	2	0
2	Bosnia and Herzegovina (BIH)	1	1
2	Denmark (DEN)	1	1
2	Turkey (TUR)	1	1
2	Norway (NOR)	0	2
2	Sweden (SWE)	0	2
2	Tunisia (TUN)	0	2
2	Venezuela (VEN)	0	2
1	Moldova (MDA)	1	0
1	Russia (RUS) (Note: Pavel Kotov's singles title in Forlì was won before the ban on Russian and Belarusian flags was announced, so this title is counted in the official tally for Russia.)	1	0
1	Chile (CHI)	0	1
1	New Zealand (NZL)	0	1
1	Uruguay (URU)	0	1
1	Zimbabwe (ZIM)	0	1

== Point distribution ==
Points were awarded as follows:

Tournament category	Singles									Doubles				
Tournament category	W	F	SF	QF	R16	R32	Q	Q2	Q1	W	F	SF	QF	R16
Challenger 125	125	75	45	25	11	0	5	2	0	125	75	45	25	0
Challenger 110	110	65	40	22	10	0	5	2	0	110	65	40	22	0
Challenger 100	100	60	36	20	9	0	5	2	0	100	60	36	20	0
Challenger 90	90	55	33	18	8	0	5	2	0	90	55	33	18	0
Challenger 80	80	50	30	16	7	0	4	2	0	80	50	30	16	0
Challenger 50	50	30	17	9	4	0	3	1	0	50	30	17	9	0

== See also ==
- 2022 ATP Tour
- 2022 ITF Men's World Tennis Tour
- 2022 WTA 125 tournaments
