= 2022 Città di Forlì II – Doubles =

Doubles
- 2022 Città di Forlì II

Final
- Champions: (France) Sadio Doumbia (France) Fabien Reboul
- Runners-up: (Colombia) Nicolás Mejía (United States) Alexander Ritschard
- Score: 6–2, 6–3

Events
Singles	Doubles
← 2022 ·	Città di Forlì	· 2022 →

Marco Bortolotti and Arjun Kadhe were the defending champions but lost in the first round to Kaichi Uchida and Wu Tung-lin.

Sadio Doumbia and Fabien Reboul won the title after defeating Nicolás Mejía and Alexander Ritschard 6–2, 6–3 in the final.

== Seeds ==
1. (United States) Robert Galloway / (United States) Max Schnur (quarterfinals)
2. (France) Sadio Doumbia / (France) Fabien Reboul (champions)
3. (Germany) Dustin Brown / (France) Albano Olivetti (quarterfinals)
4. (Italy) Marco Bortolotti / (India) Arjun Kadhe (first round)

== Draw ==
=== Key ===
- Q = Qualifier
- WC = Wild card
- LL = Lucky loser
- Alt = Alternate
- SE = Special exempt
- PR = Protected ranking
- ITF = ITF entry
- JE = Junior exempt
- w/o = Walkover
- r = Retired
- d = Defaulted
- SR = Special ranking

First round
1	(United States) R Galloway (United States) M Schnur	6	5	[10]
(France) A Hoang (France) M Martineau	2	7	[4]
(Colombia) N Mejía (United States) A Ritschard	6	6
WC	(Italy) Giacomo Dambrosi (Italy) M Gigante	4	3
4	(Italy) M Bortolotti (India) A Kadhe	2	4
(Japan) K Uchida (Chinese Taipei) T-l Wu	6	6
Alt	(Italy) F Forti (Italy) L Nardi	3	4
Alt	(Netherlands) G Brouwer (Netherlands) J Sels	6	6
(Belgium) M Geerts (Ecuador) R Quiroz	6	6^{2}	[2]
(Ukraine) V Manafov (Russia) E Tiurnev	2	7^{7}	[10]
WC	(Tunisia) M Jaziri (Italy) S Napolitano	6^{4}	6	[7]
3	(Germany) D Brown (France) A Olivetti	7^{7}	4	[10]
(United Kingdom) J Clarke (Romania) M Copil	3	6^{5}
(United Kingdom) J Draper (Croatia) B Gojo	6	7^{7}
(Romania) VV Cornea (Germany) F Fallert	5	4
2	(France) S Doumbia (France) F Reboul	7	6

Quarterfinals
1	(United States) R Galloway (United States) M Schnur	6	3	[10]
(Colombia) N Mejía (United States) A Ritschard	4	6	[12]
(Japan) K Uchida (Chinese Taipei) T-l Wu	6	7^{11}
Alt	(Netherlands) G Brouwer (Netherlands) J Sels	3	6^{9}
(Ukraine) V Manafov (Russia) E Tiurnev	6	6
3	(Germany) D Brown (France) A Olivetti	3	4
(United Kingdom) J Draper (Croatia) B Gojo	2	1
2	(France) S Doumbia (France) F Reboul	6	6

Semifinals
(Colombia) N Mejía (United States) A Ritschard	6	6
(Japan) K Uchida (Chinese Taipei) T-l Wu	4	2
(Ukraine) V Manafov (Russia) E Tiurnev	4	4
2	(France) S Doumbia (France) F Reboul	6	6

Final
(Colombia) N Mejía (United States) A Ritschard	2	3
2	(France) S Doumbia (France) F Reboul	6	6
