= 2021 Città di Forlì II – Doubles =

Doubles
- 2021 Città di Forlì II

Final
- Champions: (Croatia) Antonio Šančić (Austria) Tristan-Samuel Weissborn
- Runners-up: (Czech Republic) Lukáš Rosol (Ukraine) Vitaliy Sachko
- Score: 7–6^{(7–4)}, 4–6, [10–7]

Events
| Singles | Doubles |
| Città di Forlì – Trofeo MBM | · 2021 → |

This was the first edition of the tournament.

Antonio Šančić and Tristan-Samuel Weissborn won the title after defeating Lukáš Rosol and Vitaliy Sachko 7–6^{(7–4)}, 4–6, [10–7] in the final.

== Seeds ==
1. (Italy) Andrea Vavassori / (Spain) David Vega Hernández (semifinals)
2. (Serbia) Ivan Sabanov / (Serbia) Matej Sabanov (semifinals)
3. (Croatia) Antonio Šančić / (Austria) Tristan-Samuel Weissborn (champions)
4. (Austria) Alexander Erler / (Austria) Lucas Miedler (quarterfinals)

== Draw ==
=== Key ===
- Q = Qualifier
- WC = Wild card
- LL = Lucky loser
- Alt = Alternate
- SE = Special exempt
- PR = Protected ranking
- ITF = ITF entry
- JE = Junior exempt
- w/o = Walkover
- r = Retired
- d = Defaulted
- SR = Special ranking

First round
1 | (Italy) A Vavassori (Spain) D Vega Hernández | 6 | 6
WC | (Italy) Filippo Caporali (Italy) Augusto Virgili | 1 | 2
(Netherlands) J Sels (Netherlands) G Smits | w/o
(Germany) Y Maden (Germany) D Masur
4 | (Austria) A Erler (Austria) L Miedler | 6 | 7^{7}
WC | (Italy) Lorenzo Angelini (Italy) F Gaio | 3 | 6^{2}
(Czech Republic) L Rosol (Ukraine) V Sachko | 6 | 6
PR | (Zimbabwe) B Lock (Zimbabwe) CJ Lock | 3 | 4
(Bosnia and Herzegovina) M Bašić (Bosnia and Herzegovina) A Šetkić | 6^{5} | 6^{3}
WC | (Italy) F Forti (Italy) L Nardi | 7^{7} | 7^{7}
(Romania) VV Cornea (Greece) M Pervolarakis | 4 | 5
3 | (Croatia) A Šančić (Austria) T-S Weissborn | 6 | 7
(United States) M Cressy (Belgium) M Geerts | 7^{8} | 6^{2} | [5]
(Russia) P Kotov (Poland) P Matuszewski | 6^{6} | 7^{7} | [10]
(Italy) M Bortolotti (Spain) S Martos Gornés | 6^{4} | 6 | [6]
2 | (Serbia) I Sabanov (Serbia) M Sabanov | 7^{7} | 4 | [10]

Quarterfinals
1 | (Italy) A Vavassori (Spain) D Vega Hernández | 6 | 7
(Netherlands) J Sels (Netherlands) G Smits | 4 | 5
4 | (Austria) A Erler (Austria) L Miedler | 6 | 3 | [9]
(Czech Republic) L Rosol (Ukraine) V Sachko | 4 | 6 | [11]
WC | (Italy) F Forti (Italy) L Nardi | 6^{3} | 4
3 | (Croatia) A Šančić (Austria) T-S Weissborn | 7^{7} | 6
(Russia) P Kotov (Poland) P Matuszewski | 6 | 4 | [9]
2 | (Serbia) I Sabanov (Serbia) M Sabanov | 3 | 6 | [11]

Semifinals
1 | (Italy) A Vavassori (Spain) D Vega Hernández | 3 | 6 | [6]
(Czech Republic) L Rosol (Ukraine) V Sachko | 6 | 2 | [10]
3 | (Croatia) A Šančić (Austria) T-S Weissborn | 6 | 6
2 | (Serbia) I Sabanov (Serbia) M Sabanov | 3 | 4

Final
(Czech Republic) L Rosol (Ukraine) V Sachko | 6^{4} | 6 | [7]
3 | (Croatia) A Šančić (Austria) T-S Weissborn | 7^{7} | 4 | [10]
