= 2021 Città di Forlì II – Singles =

Singles
- 2021 Città di Forlì II

Final
- Champion: (United States) Maxime Cressy
- Runner-up: (Germany) Matthias Bachinger
- Score: 6–4, 6–2

Events
Singles	Doubles
Città di Forlì – Trofeo MBM	· 2021 →

This was the first edition of the tournament.

Maxime Cressy won the title after defeating Matthias Bachinger 6–4, 6–2 in the final.

== Seeds ==
1. (Germany) Oscar Otte (second round, retired)
2. (United States) Maxime Cressy (champion)
3. (Moldova) Radu Albot (second round)
4. (Austria) Jurij Rodionov (semifinals)
5. (Italy) Federico Gaio (first round)
6. (Turkey) Altuğ Çelikbilek (quarterfinals)
7. (Germany) Daniel Masur (first round)
8. (Italy) Thomas Fabbiano (first round)

== Draw ==
=== Key ===
- Q = Qualifier
- WC = Wild card
- LL = Lucky loser
- Alt = Alternate
- SE = Special exempt
- PR = Protected ranking
- ITF = ITF entry
- JE = Junior exempt
- w/o = Walkover
- r = Retired
- d = Defaulted
- SR = Special ranking

=== Finals ===
Semifinals
(Germany) Matthias Bachinger	4	7	6
4	(Austria) Jurij Rodionov	6	5	2
Q	(Netherlands) Jelle Sels	2	5
2	(United States) Maxime Cressy	6	7

Final
(Germany) Matthias Bachinger	4	2
2	(United States) Maxime Cressy	6	6

=== Top half ===
First round
1	(Germany) O Otte	6	7
WC	(Italy) F Forti	3	5
(United States) A Ritschard	3	4
(Germany) M Bachinger	6	6
(Ukraine) V Sachko	6	5	6
WC	(Italy) L Nardi	4	7	4
Alt	(Italy) R Brancaccio	5	2
6	(Turkey) A Çelikbilek	7	6
4	(Austria) J Rodionov	7^{7}	5	6
Q	(Czech Republic) J Forejtek	6^{4}	7	3
Q	(Bosnia and Herzegovina) A Šetkić	3	4
(Czech Republic) L Rosol	6	6
(Italy) A Arnaboldi	6	3	4
(Italy) F Cobolli	1	6	6
(Russia) P Kotov	7	6
7	(Germany) D Masur	5	4

Second round
1	(Germany) O Otte	2	1^{r}
(Germany) M Bachinger	6	3
(Ukraine) V Sachko	2	4
6	(Turkey) A Çelikbilek	6	6
4	(Austria) J Rodionov	6	6
(Czech Republic) L Rosol	3	4
(Italy) F Cobolli	6^{3}	7^{8}	7^{9}
(Russia) P Kotov	7^{7}	6^{6}	6^{7}

Quarterfinals
(Germany) M Bachinger	7^{7}	7
6	(Turkey) A Çelikbilek	6^{4}	5
4	(Austria) J Rodionov	6	6
(Italy) F Cobolli	4	2

Semifinals
(Germany) M Bachinger	4	7	6
4	(Austria) J Rodionov	6	5	2

=== Bottom half ===
First round
8	(Italy) T Fabbiano	6^{6}	6^{1}
Q	(Russia) A Vatutin	7^{8}	7^{7}
Alt	(Austria) L Miedler	7^{7}	6
(Bosnia and Herzegovina) M Bašić	6^{4}	4
Q	(Netherlands) J Sels	7^{7}	6
WC	(Italy) M Gigante	6^{3}	2
(Italy) A Vavassori	7^{7}	4	6^{2}
3	(Moldova) R Albot	6^{2}	6	7^{7}
5	(Italy) F Gaio	0	3
PR	(Germany) J Lenz	6	6
(Germany) T Kamke	4	6^{5}
(Switzerland) D Stricker	6	7^{7}
(Italy) M Viola	1	6	6
PR	(Germany) Y Maden	6	4	4
SE	(Russia) E Karlovskiy	3	2
2	(United States) M Cressy	6	6

Second round
Q	(Russia) A Vatutin	2	6	6
Alt	(Austria) L Miedler	6	0	2
Q	(Netherlands) J Sels	7	6
3	(Moldova) R Albot	5	4
PR	(Germany) J Lenz	7	7
(Switzerland) D Stricker	5	5
(Italy) M Viola	4	4
2	(United States) M Cressy	6	6

Quarterfinals
Q	(Russia) A Vatutin	3	4
Q	(Netherlands) J Sels	6	6
PR	(Germany) J Lenz	3	4
2	(United States) M Cressy	6	6

Semifinals
Q	(Netherlands) J Sels	2	5
2	(United States) M Cressy	6	7
