= 2021 Città di Forlì III – Doubles =

Doubles
- 2021 Città di Forlì III

Final
- Champions: (Austria) Alexander Erler (Austria) Lucas Miedler
- Runners-up: (Italy) Marco Bortolotti (Spain) Sergio Martos Gornés
- Score: 6–4, 6–2

Events
Singles	Doubles
- Città di Forlì – Trofeo MBM

Antonio Šančić and Tristan-Samuel Weissborn were the defending champions but chose not to defend their title.

Austrian duo Alexander Erler and Lucas Miedler won the title after defeating Marco Bortolotti and Sergio Martos Gornés 6–4, 6–2 in the final.

== Seeds ==
1. (Austria) Alexander Erler / (Austria) Lucas Miedler (champions)
2. (Italy) Marco Bortolotti / (Spain) Sergio Martos Gornés (final)
3. (Italy) Raúl Brancaccio / (Spain) David Vega Hernández (withdrew)
4. (Czech Republic) Lukáš Rosol / (Ukraine) Vitaliy Sachko (first round)

== Draw ==
Key

- Q = Qualifier
- WC = Wild card
- LL = Lucky loser
- Alt = Alternate
- ITF = ITF entry
- PR = Protected ranking
- SR = Special ranking
- SE = Special exempt
- JE = Junior exempt
- JR = Junior Accelerator Programme entrant
- CO = College Accelerator Programme entrant
- NG = Next Gen Accelerator Program entrant
- w/o = Walkover
- r = Retired
- d = Defaulted

First round
1	(Austria) A Erler (Austria) L Miedler	6	6
(Zimbabwe) B Lock (Zimbabwe) CJ Lock	3	0
(Netherlands) G Brouwer (Netherlands) G Smits	6	6
WC	(Italy) Lorenzo Angelini (Italy) Riccardo Ercolani	1	0
4	(Czech Republic) L Rosol (Ukraine) V Sachko	6^{7}	3
WC	(Italy) M Gigante (Italy) L Nardi	7^{9}	6
(Tunisia) M Echargui (Germany) H Jebens	7^{8}	3	[10]
(Greece) M Pervolarakis (Greece) Pe Tsitsipas	6^{6}	6	[4]
(Italy) Daniele Capecchi (Italy) Francesco Vilardo	6	6
WC	(Italy) CA Caniato (Italy) Filippo Caporali	2	2
(Czech Republic) M Gengel (Czech Republic) D Poljak	6	6
Alt	(Italy) Matteo Marfia (Italy) Augusto Virgili	2	3
(Bosnia and Herzegovina) A Šetkić (Monaco) V Vacherot	6^{7}	2
(Romania) VV Cornea (Germany) F Fallert	7^{9}	6
(Russia) P Kotov (Poland) P Matuszewski	3	6^{11}
2	(Italy) M Bortolotti (Spain) S Martos Gornés	6	7^{13}

Quarterfinals
1	(Austria) A Erler (Austria) L Miedler	6	7
(Netherlands) G Brouwer (Netherlands) G Smits	3	5
WC	(Italy) M Gigante (Italy) L Nardi	5	4
(Tunisia) M Echargui (Germany) H Jebens	7	6
(Italy) D Capecchi (Italy) F Vilardo	2	3
(Czech Republic) M Gengel (Czech Republic) D Poljak	6	6
(Romania) VV Cornea (Germany) F Fallert	6	6^{8}	[8]
2	(Italy) M Bortolotti (Spain) S Martos Gornés	4	7^{10}	[10]

Semifinals
1	(Austria) A Erler (Austria) L Miedler	6^{2}	6	[10]
(Tunisia) M Echargui (Germany) H Jebens	7^{7}	4	[7]
(Czech Republic) M Gengel (Czech Republic) D Poljak	4	7^{7}	[8]
2	(Italy) M Bortolotti (Spain) S Martos Gornés	6	6^{5}	[10]

Final
1	(Austria) A Erler (Austria) L Miedler	6	6
2	(Italy) M Bortolotti (Spain) S Martos Gornés	4	2
