= 2022 Città di Forlì II – Singles =

Singles
- 2022 Città di Forlì II

Final
- Champion: (United Kingdom) Jack Draper
- Runner-up: (United Kingdom) Jay Clarke
- Score: 6–3, 6–0

Events
Singles	Doubles
← 2022 ·	Città di Forlì	· 2022 →

Luca Nardi was the defending champion but lost in the second round to Jack Draper.

Draper won the title after defeating Jay Clarke 6–3, 6–0 in the final.

== Seeds ==
1. (Canada) Vasek Pospisil (quarterfinals)
2. (France) Antoine Hoang (first round)
3. (United Kingdom) Jay Clarke (final)
4. (Russia) Pavel Kotov (first round)
5. (Germany) Cedrik-Marcel Stebe (second round)
6. (Uzbekistan) Denis Istomin (first round)
7. (Japan) Kaichi Uchida (first round)
8. (United Kingdom) Jack Draper (champion)

== Draw ==
=== Key ===
- Q = Qualifier
- WC = Wild card
- LL = Lucky loser
- Alt = Alternate
- SE = Special exempt
- PR = Protected ranking
- ITF = ITF entry
- JE = Junior exempt
- w/o = Walkover
- r = Retired
- d = Defaulted
- SR = Special ranking

=== Finals ===
Semifinals
(Hungary) Zsombor Piros	4	1^{r}
8	(United Kingdom) Jack Draper	6	3
3	(United Kingdom) Jay Clarke	6	6^{5}	6
Q	(Bulgaria) Adrian Andreev	4	7^{7}	3

Final
8	(United Kingdom) Jack Draper	6	6
3	(United Kingdom) Jay Clarke	3	0

=== Top half ===
First round
1	(Canada) V Pospisil	5	7^{7}	6
Q	(Netherlands) G Brouwer	7	6^{5}	4
WC	(Italy) M Gigante	6	6
Q	(Russia) A Vatutin	2	4
WC	(Italy) Luca Potenza	3	4
(Hungary) Z Piros	6	6
(Croatia) B Gojo	6	6
6	(Uzbekistan) D Istomin	2	4
4	(Russia) P Kotov	5	7	4
(Romania) M Copil	7	5	6
(United States) A Ritschard	7^{7}	7
WC	(Italy) S Napolitano	6^{5}	5
Q	(Bosnia and Herzegovina) A Šetkić	6^{5}	5
SE	(Italy) L Nardi	7^{7}	7
(Ecuador) R Quiroz	1	4
8	(United Kingdom) J Draper	6	6

Second round
1	(Canada) V Pospisil	7^{10}	6
WC	(Italy) M Gigante	6^{8}	3
(Hungary) Z Piros	6^{5}	6	6
(Croatia) B Gojo	7^{7}	1	3
(Romania) M Copil	6^{4}	3
(United States) A Ritschard	7^{7}	6
SE	(Italy) L Nardi	0	1
8	(United Kingdom) J Draper	6	6

Quarterfinals
1	(Canada) V Pospisil	6^{3}	6^{3}
(Hungary) Z Piros	7^{7}	7^{7}
(United States) A Ritschard	6	5	3
8	(United Kingdom) J Draper	3	7	6

Semifinals
(Hungary) Z Piros	4	1^{r}
8	(United Kingdom) J Draper	6	3

=== Bottom half ===
First round
5	(Germany) C-M Stebe	7^{7}	6
(Bosnia and Herzegovina) N Fatić	6^{3}	4
(Chinese Taipei) T-l Wu	2	7^{7}	1
Q	(United Kingdom) P Jubb	6	6^{3}	6
(France) A Escoffier	7^{8}	6^{4}	6
Alt	(Italy) F Forti	6^{6}	7^{7}	3
(Colombia) N Mejía	6	3	4
3	(United Kingdom) J Clarke	4	6	6
7	(Japan) K Uchida	1	3
Q	(United Kingdom) A McHugh	6	6
SE	(India) M Sasikumar	6^{4}	0
(France) E Furness	7^{7}	6
Q	(Bulgaria) A Andreev	6	6
(Tunisia) M Jaziri	2	3
(Russia) E Tiurnev	6^{6}	7^{10}	6
2	(France) A Hoang	7^{8}	6^{8}	2

Second round
5	(Germany) C-M Stebe	6	5	1
Q	(United Kingdom) P Jubb	4	7	6
(France) A Escoffier	6	2	3
3	(United Kingdom) J Clarke	2	6	6
Q	(United Kingdom) A McHugh	6	1	4
(France) E Furness	4	6	6
Q	(Bulgaria) A Andreev	6	6
(Russia) E Tiurnev	4	3

Quarterfinals
Q	(United Kingdom) P Jubb	4	6^{0}
3	(United Kingdom) J Clarke	6	7^{7}
(France) E Furness	6^{6}	6	3
Q	(Bulgaria) A Andreev	7^{8}	4	6

Semifinals
3	(United Kingdom) J Clarke	6	6^{5}	6
Q	(Bulgaria) A Andreev	4	7^{7}	3
