= 2022 Città di Forlì IV – Doubles =

Doubles
- 2022 Città di Forlì IV

Final
- Champions: (Romania) Victor Vlad Cornea (Germany) Fabian Fallert
- Runners-up: (Croatia) Antonio Šančić (Slovakia) Igor Zelenay
- Score: 6–4, 3–6, [10–2]

Events
Singles	Doubles
← 2022 ·	Città di Forlì	· 2022 →

Victor Vlad Cornea and Fabian Fallert were the defending champions and successfully defended their title, defeating Antonio Šančić and Igor Zelenay 6–4, 3–6, [10–2] in the final.

== Seeds ==
1. (Croatia) Antonio Šančić / (Slovakia) Igor Zelenay (final)
2. (Portugal) Nuno Borges / (Portugal) Francisco Cabral (quarterfinals)
3. (Netherlands) Robin Haase / (Netherlands) Tim van Rijthoven (quarterfinals)
4. (Italy) Marco Bortolotti / (Ukraine) Vitaliy Sachko (quarterfinals)

== Draw ==
=== Key ===
- Q = Qualifier
- WC = Wild card
- LL = Lucky loser
- Alt = Alternate
- SE = Special exempt
- PR = Protected ranking
- ITF = ITF entry
- JE = Junior exempt
- w/o = Walkover
- r = Retired
- d = Defaulted
- SR = Special ranking

First round
1	(Croatia) A Šančić (Slovakia) I Zelenay	6	7
(Italy) L Giustino (Poland) P Matuszewski	3	5
(Netherlands) J de Jong (Netherlands) B Stevens	6^{2}	3
(Belgium) R Bemelmans (Germany) M Marterer	7^{7}	6
3	(Netherlands) R Haase (Netherlands) T van Rijthoven	6	3	[10]
Alt	(United States) A Ritschard (Canada) B Schnur	1	6	[7]
(France) J Eysseric (France) Q Halys	6	6
WC	(Italy) Cristian Capacci (Italy) Riccardo Ercolani	3	3
(Ecuador) D Hidalgo (Zimbabwe) B Lock	7	7^{7}
(Switzerland) L Margaroli (Japan) Y Uchiyama	5	6^{5}
(Spain) S Martos Gornés (Spain) A Menéndez Maceiras	6	2	[6]
(Romania) VV Cornea (Germany) F Fallert	4	6	[10]
WC	(Italy) Lorenzo Angelini (Bosnia and Herzegovina) A Šetkić	1	1
2	(Portugal) N Borges (Portugal) F Cabral	6	6

Quarterfinals
1	(Croatia) A Šančić (Slovakia) I Zelenay	6	4	[10]
(Belgium) R Bemelmans (Germany) M Marterer	4	6	[8]
3	(Netherlands) R Haase (Netherlands) T van Rijthoven	6	4	[7]
(France) J Eysseric (France) Q Halys	3	6	[10]
(Ecuador) D Hidalgo (Zimbabwe) B Lock	6	7^{7}
4	(Italy) M Bortolotti (Ukraine) V Sachko	3	6^{2}
(Romania) VV Cornea (Germany) F Fallert	6	3	[13]
2	(Portugal) N Borges (Portugal) F Cabral	3	6	[11]

Semifinals
1	(Croatia) A Šančić (Slovakia) I Zelenay	7^{7}	7^{7}
(France) J Eysseric (France) Q Halys	6^{5}	6^{2}
(Ecuador) D Hidalgo (Zimbabwe) B Lock	6	3	[5]
(Romania) VV Cornea (Germany) F Fallert	4	6	[10]

Final
1	(Croatia) A Šančić (Slovakia) I Zelenay	4	6	[2]
(Romania) VV Cornea (Germany) F Fallert	6	3	[10]
