= 2022 Città di Forlì – Doubles =

Doubles
- 2022 Città di Forlì

Final
- Champions: (Italy) Marco Bortolotti (India) Arjun Kadhe
- Runners-up: (Belgium) Michael Geerts (United States) Alexander Ritschard
- Score: 7–6^{(7–5)}, 6–2

Events
Singles	Doubles
- Città di Forlì

Alexander Erler and Lucas Miedler were the defending champions but chose not to compete.

Marco Bortolotti and Arjun Kadhe won the title after defeating Michael Geerts and Alexander Ritschard 7–6^{(7–5)}, 6–2 in the final.

== Seeds ==
1. (France) Sadio Doumbia / (France) Fabien Reboul (semifinals)
2. (Germany) Dustin Brown / (Germany) Julian Lenz (semifinals, withdrew)
3. (Italy) Marco Bortolotti / (India) Arjun Kadhe (champions)
4. (Ukraine) Vladyslav Manafov / (Poland) Piotr Matuszewski (quarterfinals)

== Draw ==
Key

- Q = Qualifier
- WC = Wild card
- LL = Lucky loser
- Alt = Alternate
- ITF = ITF entry
- PR = Protected ranking
- SR = Special ranking
- SE = Special exempt
- JE = Junior exempt
- JR = Junior Accelerator Programme entrant
- CO = College Accelerator Programme entrant
- NG = Next Gen Accelerator Program entrant
- w/o = Walkover
- r = Retired
- d = Defaulted

First round
1	(France) S Doumbia (France) F Reboul	7^{7}	6
(United States) C Harrison (Germany) C-M Stebe	6^{3}	2
PR	(France) E Furness (Finland) P Niklas-Salminen	6^{5}	2
WC	(Italy) M Bellucci (Italy) M Gigante	7^{7}	6
4	(Ukraine) V Manafov (Poland) P Matuszewski	7^{7}	7^{7}
(United Kingdom) J Clarke (United Kingdom) A McHugh	6^{4}	6^{3}
(Italy) F Forti (Russia) A Vatutin	1	2
(Belgium) M Geerts (United States) A Ritschard	6	6
(Romania) VV Cornea (Germany) F Fallert	6^{5}	6^{7}
(Netherlands) G Smits (Kazakhstan) D Yevseyev	7^{7}	7^{9}
(United States) N Chappell (Chinese Taipei) Y-h Hsu	6	4	[10]
3	(Italy) M Bortolotti (India) A Kadhe	2	6	[12]
(Morocco) E Benchetrit (Portugal) G Oliveira	4	6	[11]
WC	(Switzerland) R Bertola (Italy) S Napolitano	6	2	[9]
(Chinese Taipei) T-l Wu (China) Zh Zhang	3	4
2	(Germany) D Brown (Germany) J Lenz	6	6

Quarterfinals
1	(France) S Doumbia (France) F Reboul	6	6
WC	(Italy) M Bellucci (Italy) M Gigante	0	3
4	(Ukraine) V Manafov (Poland) P Matuszewski	6^{8}	5
(Belgium) M Geerts (United States) A Ritschard	7^{10}	7
(Netherlands) G Smits (Kazakhstan) D Yevseyev	3	2
3	(Italy) M Bortolotti (India) A Kadhe	6	6
(Morocco) E Benchetrit (Portugal) G Oliveira
2	(Germany) D Brown (Germany) J Lenz	w/o

Semifinals
1	(France) S Doumbia (France) F Reboul	4	6	[8]
(Belgium) M Geerts (United States) A Ritschard	6	3	[10]
3	(Italy) M Bortolotti (India) A Kadhe	w/o
2	(Germany) D Brown (Germany) J Lenz

Final
(Belgium) M Geerts (United States) A Ritschard	6^{5}	2
3	(Italy) M Bortolotti (India) A Kadhe	7^{7}	6
