= 2022 Città di Forlì II =

- Date: 10–16 January
- Edition: 4th
- Draw: 32S / 16D
- Surface: Hard (Indoor)
- Location: Forlì, Italy

Champions

Singles
- (United Kingdom) Jack Draper

Doubles
- (France) Sadio Doumbia / (France) Fabien Reboul
← 2022 ·	Città di Forlì	· 2022 →

The 2022 Città di Forlì II was a professional tennis tournament played on hard courts. It was the fourth edition of the tournament which was part of the 2022 ATP Challenger Tour. It took place in Forlì, Italy between 10 and 16 January 2022.

== Singles main-draw entrants ==
=== Seeds ===
Country	Player	Rank^{1}	Seed
CAN	Vasek Pospisil	133	1
FRA	Antoine Hoang	200	2
GBR	Jay Clarke	215	3
RUS	Pavel Kotov	225	4
GER	Cedrik-Marcel Stebe	227	5
UZB	Denis Istomin	254	6
JPN	Kaichi Uchida	259	7
GBR	Jack Draper	265	8

- ^{1} Rankings as of 3 January 2022.

=== Other entrants ===
The following players received wildcards into the singles main draw:

- (Italy) Matteo Gigante
- (Italy) Stefano Napolitano
- (Italy) Luca Potenza

The following players received entry into the singles main draw as special exempts:

- (Italy) Luca Nardi
- (India) Mukund Sasikumar

The following player received entry into the singles main draw as an alternate:

- (Italy) Francesco Forti

The following players received entry from the qualifying draw:

- (Bulgaria) Adrian Andreev
- (Netherlands) Gijs Brouwer
- (United Kingdom) Paul Jubb
- (United Kingdom) Aidan McHugh
- (Bosnia and Herzegovina) Aldin Šetkić
- (Russia) Alexey Vatutin

== Champions ==
=== Singles ===
- (United Kingdom) Jack Draper def. (United Kingdom) Jay Clarke 6–3, 6–0.

=== Doubles ===
- (France) Sadio Doumbia / (France) Fabien Reboul def. (Colombia) Nicolás Mejía / (United States) Alexander Ritschard 6–2, 6–3.
