= 2022 Città di Forlì III – Doubles =

Doubles
- 2022 Città di Forlì III

Final
- Champions: (Romania) Victor Vlad Cornea (Germany) Fabian Fallert
- Runners-up: (Czech Republic) Jonáš Forejtek (Netherlands) Jelle Sels
- Score: 6–4, 6–7^{(6–8)}, [10–7]

Events
Singles	Doubles
← 2022 ·	Città di Forlì	· 2022 →

Sadio Doumbia and Fabien Reboul were the defending champions but lost in the quarterfinals to Victor Vlad Cornea and Fabian Fallert.

Cornea and Fallert won the title after defeating Jonáš Forejtek and Jelle Sels 6–4, 6–7^{(6–8)}, [10–7] in the final.

== Seeds ==
1. (United States) Robert Galloway / (United States) Max Schnur (first round)
2. (France) Sadio Doumbia / (France) Fabien Reboul (quarterfinals)
3. (Austria) Alexander Erler / (Austria) Lucas Miedler (quarterfinals)
4. (India) Sriram Balaji / (Poland) Karol Drzewiecki (first round)

== Draw ==
Key

- Q = Qualifier
- WC = Wild card
- LL = Lucky loser
- Alt = Alternate
- ITF = ITF entry
- PR = Protected ranking
- SR = Special ranking
- SE = Special exempt
- JE = Junior exempt
- JR = Junior Accelerator Programme entrant
- CO = College Accelerator Programme entrant
- NG = Next Gen Accelerator Program entrant
- w/o = Walkover
- r = Retired
- d = Defaulted

First round
1	(United States) R Galloway (United States) M Schnur	4	3
(France) Q Halys (France) A Olivetti	6	6
(Switzerland) L Margaroli (Poland) K Żuk	6	6
WC	(Italy) Lorenzo Angelini (Italy) Riccardo Ercolani	3	3
3	(Austria) A Erler (Austria) L Miedler	7	6
(Russia) E Karlovskiy (Russia) E Tiurnev	5	2
WC	(Italy) CA Caniato (Italy) Christian Capacci	1	0
(Czech Republic) J Forejtek (Netherlands) J Sels	6	6
(Uzbekistan) D Istomin (Russia) P Kotov	4	3
(France) J Eysseric (Slovakia) I Zelenay	6	6
(Italy) F Agamenone (Italy) A Pellegrino	1	6	[10]
4	(India) S Balaji (Poland) K Drzewiecki	6	4	[7]
(Romania) VV Cornea (Germany) F Fallert	7^{7}	6
Alt	(United States) A Ayeni (France) E Furness	6^{5}	4
(India) A Kadhe (Ukraine) V Manafov	6^{6}	4
2	(France) S Doumbia (France) F Reboul	7^{8}	6

Quarterfinals
(France) Q Halys (France) A Olivetti	4	6	[6]
(Switzerland) L Margaroli (Poland) K Żuk	6	3	[10]
3	(Austria) A Erler (Austria) L Miedler	6^{5}	6	[4]
(Czech Republic) J Forejtek (Netherlands) J Sels	7^{7}	4	[10]
(France) J Eysseric (Slovakia) I Zelenay	6^{2}	6	[10]
(Italy) F Agamenone (Italy) A Pellegrino	7^{7}	3	[6]
(Romania) VV Cornea (Germany) F Fallert	4	7^{7}	[10]
2	(France) S Doumbia (France) F Reboul	6	6^{4}	[5]

Semifinals
(Switzerland) L Margaroli (Poland) K Żuk	4	4
(Czech Republic) J Forejtek (Netherlands) J Sels	6	6
(France) J Eysseric (Slovakia) I Zelenay	7	5	[7]
(Romania) VV Cornea (Germany) F Fallert	5	7	[10]

Final
(Czech Republic) J Forejtek (Netherlands) J Sels	4	7^{8}	[7]
(Romania) VV Cornea (Germany) F Fallert	6	6^{6}	[10]
