= 2021 Città di Forlì III =

- Date: 6–12 December
- Edition: 2nd
- Draw: 32S / 16D
- Surface: Hard (Indoor)
- Location: Forlì, Italy

Champions

Singles
- (Russia) Pavel Kotov

Doubles
- (Austria) Alexander Erler / (Austria) Lucas Miedler
← 2021 ·	Città di Forlì	· 2022 →

The 2021 Città di Forlì III was a professional tennis tournament played on hard courts. It was the second edition of the tournament which was part of the 2021 ATP Challenger Tour. It took place in Forlì, Italy between 6 and 12 December 2021.

== Singles main-draw entrants ==
=== Seeds ===
Country	Player	Rank^{1}	Seed
USA	Maxime Cressy	122	1
ITA	Federico Gaio	153	2
ITA	Salvatore Caruso	157	3
BEL	Zizou Bergs	185	4
BIH	Mirza Bašić	231	5
UKR	Vitaliy Sachko	260	6
ITA	Andrea Vavassori	262	7
ITA	Andrea Arnaboldi	266	8

- ^{1} Rankings as of 29 November 2021.

=== Other entrants ===
The following players received wildcards into the singles main draw:

- (Italy) Matteo Gigante
- (Italy) Luca Nardi
- (Czech Republic) Lukáš Rosol

The following players received entry into the singles main draw using protected rankings:

- (Italy) Filippo Baldi
- (Germany) Julian Lenz

The following player received entry into the singles main draw as an alternate:

- (Monaco) Valentin Vacherot

The following players received entry from the qualifying draw:

- (Italy) Daniele Capecchi
- (Russia) Savriyan Danilov
- (Italy) Luca Potenza
- (United States) Keegan Smith

== Champions ==
=== Singles ===
- (Russia) Pavel Kotov def. (Italy) Andrea Arnaboldi 6–4, 6–3.

=== Doubles ===
- (Austria) Alexander Erler / (Austria) Lucas Miedler def. (Italy) Marco Bortolotti / (Spain) Sergio Martos Gornés 6–4, 6–2.
