= 2022 Città di Forlì III – Singles =

Singles
- 2022 Città di Forlì III

Final
- Champion: (Russia) Pavel Kotov
- Runner-up: (France) Quentin Halys
- Score: 7–5, 6–7^{(5–7)}, 6–3

Events
Singles	Doubles
← 2022 ·	Città di Forlì	· 2022 →

Jack Draper was the defending champion but lost in the first round to Borna Gojo.

Pavel Kotov won the title after defeating Quentin Halys 7–5, 6–7^{(5–7)}, 6–3 in the final.

== Seeds ==
1. (Canada) Vasek Pospisil (quarterfinals)
2. (France) Quentin Halys (final)
3. (Turkey) Cem İlkel (first round)
4. (Turkey) Altuğ Çelikbilek (first round)
5. (France) Grégoire Barrère (first round)
6. (Poland) Kacper Żuk (first round)
7. (Germany) Daniel Masur (second round)
8. (Slovakia) Lukáš Lacko (first round)

== Draw ==
=== Key ===
- Q = Qualifier
- WC = Wild card
- LL = Lucky loser
- Alt = Alternate
- SE = Special exempt
- PR = Protected ranking
- ITF = ITF entry
- JE = Junior exempt
- w/o = Walkover
- r = Retired
- d = Defaulted
- SR = Special ranking

=== Finals ===
Semifinals
(Portugal) Frederico Ferreira Silva	1	3
(Russia) Pavel Kotov	6	6
(Germany) Cedrik-Marcel Stebe	7^{8}	2	4
2	(France) Quentin Halys	6^{6}	6	6

Final
(Russia) Pavel Kotov	7	6^{5}	6
2	(France) Quentin Halys	5	7^{7}	3

=== Top half ===
First round
1	(Canada) V Pospisil	6	6
LL	(France) E Furness	4	3
WC	(Italy) S Napolitano	7^{8}	2	7^{7}
(Croatia) N Serdarušić	6^{6}	6	6^{2}
(Portugal) F Ferreira Silva	6	6
WC	(Italy) M Arnaldi	3	3
WC	(Italy) A Pellegrino	0	6	7^{7}
8	(Slovakia) L Lacko	6	3	6^{0}
3	(Turkey) C İlkel	4	6^{7}
Q	(Czech Republic) L Rosol	6	7^{9}
SE	(United Kingdom) J Draper	6^{3}	3
Q	(Croatia) B Gojo	7^{7}	6
(Russia) P Kotov	6	6
Alt	(Uzbekistan) D Istomin	4	4
(Italy) A Arnaboldi	6^{3}	6	4
7	(Germany) D Masur	7^{7}	3	6

Second round
1	(Canada) V Pospisil	6	6
WC	(Italy) S Napolitano	3	4
(Portugal) F Ferreira Silva	4	7^{7}	7^{7}
WC	(Italy) A Pellegrino	6	6^{5}	6^{5}
Q	(Czech Republic) L Rosol	6	6^{4}	6
Q	(Croatia) B Gojo	4	7^{7}	4
(Russia) P Kotov	6	6
7	(Germany) D Masur	2	0

Quarterfinals
1	(Canada) V Pospisil	6^{3}	7^{7}	5
(Portugal) F Ferreira Silva	7^{7}	6^{1}	7
Q	(Czech Republic) L Rosol	4	4
(Russia) P Kotov	6	6

Semifinals
(Portugal) F Ferreira Silva	1	3
(Russia) P Kotov	6	6

=== Bottom half ===
First round
5	(France) G Barrère	4	7^{7}	2
(United Kingdom) J Clarke	6	6^{4}	6
Q	(France) A Escoffier	4	4
(Germany) C-M Stebe	6	6
(Italy) F Agamenone	6	3	6
Q	(Romania) M Copil	2	6	3
Q	(Japan) K Uchida	6	4	7^{7}
4	(Turkey) A Çelikbilek	3	6	6^{4}
6	(Poland) K Żuk	6	3	5
Alt	(Chinese Taipei) T-l Wu	4	6	7
(France) A Hoang	7^{7}	0	2
(Italy) GM Moroni	6^{4}	6	6
(France) M Guinard	6^{5}	6	6
Q	(Russia) E Tiurnev	7^{7}	4	3
(India) P Gunneswaran	3	1
2	(France) Q Halys	6	6

Second round
(United Kingdom) J Clarke	3	3
(Germany) C-M Stebe	6	6
(Italy) F Agamenone	6	6
Q	(Japan) K Uchida	2	4
Alt	(Chinese Taipei) T-l Wu	6^{8}	3
(Italy) GM Moroni	7^{10}	6
(France) M Guinard	7	1	2
2	(France) Q Halys	5	6	6

Quarterfinals
(Germany) C-M Stebe	7	7
(Italy) F Agamenone	5	5
(Italy) GM Moroni	6^{1}	6^{2}
2	(France) Q Halys	7^{7}	7^{7}

Semifinals
(Germany) C-M Stebe	7^{8}	2	4
2	(France) Q Halys	6^{6}	6	6
