= 2022 Città di Forlì IV – Singles =

Singles
- 2022 Città di Forlì IV

Final
- Champion: (United Kingdom) Jack Draper
- Runner-up: (Netherlands) Tim van Rijthoven
- Score: 6–1, 6–2

Events
Singles	Doubles
← 2022 ·	Città di Forlì	· 2022 →

Pavel Kotov was the defending champion but chose not to defend his title.

Jack Draper won the title after defeating Tim van Rijthoven 6–1, 6–2 in the final.

== Seeds ==
1. (France) Quentin Halys (second round)
2. (Italy) Salvatore Caruso (withdrew)
3. (France) Grégoire Barrère (quarterfinals)
4. (Portugal) Nuno Borges (semifinals)
5. (Italy) Gian Marco Moroni (first round)
6. (Japan) Yasutaka Uchiyama (first round)
7. (Netherlands) Jesper de Jong (first round)
8. (Portugal) Gastão Elias (first round)

== Draw ==
=== Key ===
- Q = Qualifier
- WC = Wild card
- LL = Lucky loser
- Alt = Alternate
- SE = Special exempt
- PR = Protected ranking
- ITF = ITF entry
- JE = Junior exempt
- w/o = Walkover
- r = Retired
- d = Defaulted
- SR = Special ranking

=== Finals ===
Semifinals
(United Kingdom) Jack Draper	6	4	6
Q	(Japan) Yosuke Watanuki	3	6	3
4	(Portugal) Nuno Borges	4	2
Q	(Netherlands) Tim van Rijthoven	6	6

Final
(United Kingdom) Jack Draper	6	6
Q	(Netherlands) Tim van Rijthoven	1	2

=== Top half ===
First round
1	(France) Q Halys	6	7^{7}
(Ukraine) V Sachko	1	6^{3}
(United Kingdom) J Draper	6	6
(Bosnia and Herzegovina) M Bašić	2	2
Q	(France) E Furness	7^{7}	7^{7}
(France) A Hoang	6^{5}	6^{4}
(Denmark) M Torpegaard	7^{7}	2	7^{8}
5	(Italy) GM Moroni	6^{4}	6	6^{6}
3	(France) G Barrère	6	6
Alt	(Italy) G Zeppieri	3	4
Q	(Germany) B Hassan	6	6
(Belgium) R Bemelmans	4	4
(Germany) M Marterer	6^{5}	6	7^{7}
(Croatia) N Serdarušić	7^{7}	4	6^{2}
Q	(Japan) Yo Watanuki	6	6
7	(Netherlands) J de Jong	2	4

Second round
1	(France) Q Halys	6^{4}	4
(United Kingdom) J Draper	7^{7}	6
Q	(France) E Furness	6	4
(Denmark) M Torpegaard	1	3^{r}
3	(France) G Barrère	6	3
Q	(Germany) B Hassan	1	0^{r}
(Germany) M Marterer	7	2	3
Q	(Japan) Yo Watanuki	5	6	6

Quarterfinals
(United Kingdom) J Draper	6	6
Q	(France) E Furness	2	3
3	(France) G Barrère	5	3
Q	(Japan) Yo Watanuki	7	6

Semifinals
(United Kingdom) J Draper	6	4	6
Q	(Japan) Yo Watanuki	3	6	3

=== Bottom half ===
First round
8	(Portugal) G Elias	1	4
WC	(Italy) S Napolitano	6	6
WC	(Italy) M Arnaldi	2	7	2
(France) C Lestienne	6	5	6
(Italy) A Pellegrino	6	6
Alt	(Portugal) J Domingues	1	3
(Italy) L Giustino	6^{4}	3
4	(Portugal) N Borges	7^{7}	6
6	(Japan) Y Uchiyama	2	6^{1}
Q	(Netherlands) T van Rijthoven	6	7^{7}
WC	(Italy) M Gigante	4	6	1
(Canada) B Schnur	6	3	6
Q	(Hungary) Z Piros	6	4	0
Q	(United States) Em Nava	4	6	6
(Netherlands) R Haase	7^{7}	6
LL	(Japan) H Moriya	6^{2}	3

Second round
WC	(Italy) S Napolitano	5	6	4
(France) C Lestienne	7	4	6
(Italy) A Pellegrino	1	4
4	(Portugal) N Borges	6	6
Q	(Netherlands) T van Rijthoven	7^{7}	7
(Canada) B Schnur	6^{5}	5
Q	(United States) Em Nava	5	2
(Netherlands) R Haase	7	6

Quarterfinals
(France) C Lestienne	3	3
4	(Portugal) N Borges	6	6
Q	(Netherlands) T van Rijthoven	6	6
(Netherlands) R Haase	4	3

Semifinals
4	(Portugal) N Borges	4	2
Q	(Netherlands) T van Rijthoven	6	6
