= 2022 Banja Luka Challenger – Doubles =

Doubles
- 2022 Banja Luka Challenger

Final
- Champions: (Ukraine) Vladyslav Manafov (Ukraine) Oleg Prihodko
- Runners-up: (Germany) Fabian Fallert (Germany) Hendrik Jebens
- Score: 6–3, 6–4

Events
Singles	Doubles
← 2021 ·	Banja Luka Challenger	· 2023 →

Antonio Šančić and Nino Serdarušić were the defending champions but chose not to defend their title.

Vladyslav Manafov and Oleg Prihodko won the title after defeating Fabian Fallert and Hendrik Jebens 6–3, 6–4 in the final.

== Seeds ==
1. (Serbia) Ivan Sabanov / (Serbia) Matej Sabanov (semifinals)
2. (Ukraine) Denys Molchanov / (Slovakia) Igor Zelenay (first round)
3. (Netherlands) Sem Verbeek / (Poland) Szymon Walków (quarterfinals)
4. (India) Sriram Balaji / (India) Jeevan Nedunchezhiyan (quarterfinals)

== Draw ==
=== Key ===
- Q = Qualifier
- WC = Wild card
- LL = Lucky loser
- Alt = Alternate
- SE = Special exempt
- PR = Protected ranking
- ITF = ITF entry
- JE = Junior exempt
- w/o = Walkover
- r = Retired
- d = Defaulted
- SR = Special ranking

First round
1	(Serbia) I Sabanov (Serbia) M Sabanov	7^{7}	6
(Argentina) H Casanova (Argentina) G Villanueva	6^{2}	4
WC	(Bosnia and Herzegovina) A Nedić (Bosnia and Herzegovina) Dražen Petrović	2	2
(Bosnia and Herzegovina) M Bašić (Bosnia and Herzegovina) N Fatić	6	6
3	(Netherlands) S Verbeek (Poland) S Walków	6	6
(Bolivia) B Arias (Bolivia) F Zeballos	1	4
(Germany) F Fallert (Germany) H Jebens	6	6
WC	(Ukraine) Yevhenii Bondarenko (Ukraine) Dmytrii Ierokhin	1	2
(Norway) V Durasovic (Finland) O Virtanen	7^{7}	6
Alt	(Peru) N Álvarez (Chile) G Lama	6^{3}	1
(India) A Kadhe (Brazil) F Romboli	6	6^{7}	[5]
4	(India) S Balaji (India) J Nedunchezhiyan	3	7^{9}	[10]
(Lebanon) B Hassan (Austria) L Miedler	4	4
(Austria) M Neuchrist (Austria) T-S Weissborn	6	6
(Ukraine) V Manafov (Ukraine) O Prihodko	2	7^{7}	[10]
2	(Ukraine) D Molchanov (Slovakia) I Zelenay	6	6^{1}	[6]

Quarterfinals
1	(Serbia) I Sabanov (Serbia) M Sabanov	6	6
(Bosnia and Herzegovina) M Bašić (Bosnia and Herzegovina) N Fatić	1	2
3	(Netherlands) S Verbeek (Poland) S Walków	3	6^{5}
(Germany) F Fallert (Germany) H Jebens	6	7^{7}
(Norway) V Durasovic (Finland) O Virtanen	7^{7}	7
4	(India) S Balaji (India) J Nedunchezhiyan	6^{3}	5
(Austria) M Neuchrist (Austria) T-S Weissborn	3	4
(Ukraine) V Manafov (Ukraine) O Prihodko	6	6

Semifinals
1	(Serbia) I Sabanov (Serbia) M Sabanov	6^{4}	5
(Germany) F Fallert (Germany) H Jebens	7^{7}	7
(Norway) V Durasovic (Finland) O Virtanen	6^{2}	4
(Ukraine) V Manafov (Ukraine) O Prihodko	7^{7}	6

Final
(Germany) F Fallert (Germany) H Jebens	3	4
(Ukraine) V Manafov (Ukraine) O Prihodko	6	6
