= 2021 Città di Forlì II =

- Date: 29 November – 5 December
- Edition: 1st
- Draw: 32S / 16D
- Surface: Hard (Indoor)
- Location: Forlì, Italy

Champions

Singles
- (United States) Maxime Cressy

Doubles
- (Croatia) Antonio Šančić / (Austria) Tristan-Samuel Weissborn
Città di Forlì – Trofeo MBM	· 2021 →

The 2021 Città di Forlì II was a professional tennis tournament played on hard courts. It was the first edition of the tournament which was part of the 2021 ATP Challenger Tour. It took place in Forlì, Italy between 29 November and 5 December 2021.

== Singles main-draw entrants ==
=== Seeds ===
Country	Player	Rank^{1}	Seed
GER	Oscar Otte	112	1
USA	Maxime Cressy	122	2
MDA	Radu Albot	125	3
AUT	Jurij Rodionov	139	4
ITA	Federico Gaio	153	5
TUR	Altuğ Çelikbilek	164	6
GER	Daniel Masur	204	7
ITA	Thomas Fabbiano	213	8

- ^{1} Rankings as of 22 November 2021.

=== Other entrants ===
The following players received wildcards into the singles main draw:

- (Italy) Francesco Forti
- (Italy) Matteo Gigante
- (Italy) Luca Nardi

The following players received entry into the singles main draw using protected rankings:

- (Germany) Julian Lenz
- (Germany) Yannick Maden

The following player received entry into the singles main draw as a special exempt:

- (Russia) Evgeny Karlovskiy

The following players received entry into the singles main draw as alternates:

- (Italy) Raúl Brancaccio
- (Austria) Lucas Miedler

The following players received entry from the qualifying draw:

- (Czech Republic) Jonáš Forejtek
- (Netherlands) Jelle Sels
- (Bosnia and Herzegovina) Aldin Šetkić
- (Russia) Alexey Vatutin

== Champions ==
=== Singles ===
- (United States) Maxime Cressy def. (Germany) Matthias Bachinger 6–4, 6–2.

=== Doubles ===
- (Croatia) Antonio Šančić / (Austria) Tristan-Samuel Weissborn def. (Czech Republic) Lukáš Rosol / (Ukraine) Vitaliy Sachko 7–6^{(7–4)}, 4–6, [10–7].
