= 2021 Città di Forlì III – Singles =

Singles
- 2021 Città di Forlì III

Final
- Champion: (Russia) Pavel Kotov
- Runner-up: (Italy) Andrea Arnaboldi
- Score: 6–4, 6–3

Events
Singles	Doubles
- Città di Forlì – Trofeo MBM

Maxime Cressy was the defending champion but lost in the quarterfinals to Vitaliy Sachko.

Pavel Kotov won the title after defeating Andrea Arnaboldi 6–4, 6–3 in the final.

== Seeds ==
1. (United States) Maxime Cressy (quarterfinals)
2. (Italy) Federico Gaio (first round)
3. (Italy) Salvatore Caruso (first round)
4. (Belgium) Zizou Bergs (first round)
5. (Bosnia and Herzegovina) Mirza Bašić (quarterfinals)
6. (Ukraine) Vitaliy Sachko (semifinals, retired)
7. (Italy) Andrea Vavassori (first round)
8. (Italy) Andrea Arnaboldi (final)

== Draw ==
Key

- Q = Qualifier
- WC = Wild card
- LL = Lucky loser
- Alt = Alternate
- ITF = ITF entry
- PR = Protected ranking
- SR = Special ranking
- SE = Special exempt
- JE = Junior exempt
- JR = Junior Accelerator Programme entrant
- CO = College Accelerator Programme entrant
- NG = Next Gen Accelerator Program entrant
- w/o = Walkover
- r = Retired
- d = Defaulted

=== Finals ===
Semifinals
6	(Ukraine) Vitaliy Sachko	4	0^{r}
(Russia) Pavel Kotov	6	4
8	(Italy) Andrea Arnaboldi	4	6	6
WC	(Italy) Luca Nardi	6	3	4

Final
(Russia) Pavel Kotov	6	6
8	(Italy) Andrea Arnaboldi	4	3

=== Top half ===
First round
1	(United States) M Cressy	6	6
(Netherlands) J Sels	3	2
(Czech Republic) M Gengel	2	6	2
WC	(Italy) M Gigante	6	3	6
(Zimbabwe) B Lock	3	1
Q	(Italy) Daniele Capecchi	6	6
(Austria) A Erler	6	2	2
6	(Ukraine) V Sachko	3	6	6
4	(Belgium) Z Bergs	5	7^{7}	5
(Russia) P Kotov	7	6^{5}	7
Q	(United States) K Smith	7	6
Alt	(Monaco) V Vacherot	5	4
(Czech Republic) D Poljak	7	4	3
(Austria) L Miedler	5	6	6
Q	(Russia) S Danilov	3	4
5	(Bosnia and Herzegovina) M Bašić	6	6

Second round
1	(United States) M Cressy	7^{7}	6
WC	(Italy) M Gigante	6^{3}	2
Q	(Italy) D Capecchi	7^{7}	1	2
6	(Ukraine) V Sachko	6^{4}	6	6
(Russia) P Kotov	7	6
Q	(United States) K Smith	5	2
(Austria) L Miedler	2	3
5	(Bosnia and Herzegovina) M Bašić	6	6

Quarterfinals
1	(United States) M Cressy	6^{4}	6^{2}
6	(Ukraine) V Sachko	7^{7}	7^{7}
(Russia) P Kotov	6	6
5	(Bosnia and Herzegovina) M Bašić	2	3

Semifinals
6	(Ukraine) V Sachko	4	0^{r}
(Russia) P Kotov	6	4

=== Bottom half ===
First round
8	(Italy) A Arnaboldi	6	4
(Italy) R Brancaccio	2	1^{r}
(Netherlands) G Brouwer	6	6
PR	(Germany) J Lenz	2	3
(Greece) M Pervolarakis	6	6
Q	(Italy) Luca Potenza	3	4
PR	(Italy) F Baldi	6	6
3	(Italy) S Caruso	2	3
7	(Italy) A Vavassori	4	2
WC	(Italy) L Nardi	6	6
(Romania) M Copil	7^{7}	3	3
(Russia) A Vatutin	6^{4}	6	6
(Italy) M Viola	7^{7}	4	7
WC	(Czech Republic) L Rosol	6^{1}	6	5
(Bosnia and Herzegovina) A Šetkić	7	6
2	(Italy) F Gaio	5	2

Second round
8	(Italy) A Arnaboldi	6	4	7
(Netherlands) G Brouwer	4	6	5
(Greece) M Pervolarakis	6	6
PR	(Italy) F Baldi	4	4
WC	(Italy) L Nardi	7^{8}	6
(Russia) A Vatutin	6^{6}	4
(Italy) M Viola	1	3
(Bosnia and Herzegovina) A Šetkić	6	6

Quarterfinals
8	(Italy) A Arnaboldi	6	6
(Greece) M Pervolarakis	4	3
WC	(Italy) L Nardi	6	6
(Bosnia and Herzegovina) A Šetkić	0	4

Semifinals
8	(Italy) A Arnaboldi	4	6	6
WC	(Italy) L Nardi	6	3	4
