= 2022 Città di Forlì V – Doubles =

Doubles
- 2022 Città di Forlì V

Final
- Champions: (Italy) Marco Bortolotti (Ukraine) Vitaliy Sachko
- Runners-up: (Romania) Victor Vlad Cornea (Germany) Fabian Fallert
- Score: 7–6^{(7–5)}, 3–6, [10–5]

Events
Singles	Doubles
- Città di Forlì

Victor Vlad Cornea and Fabian Fallert were the defending champions but lost in the final to Marco Bortolotti and Vitaliy Sachko.

Bortolotti and Sachko won the title after defeating Cornea and Fallert 7–6^{(7–5)}, 3–6, [10–5] in the final.

== Seeds ==
1. (United States) Evan King / (United States) Alex Lawson (semifinals)
2. (Croatia) Antonio Šančić / (Slovakia) Igor Zelenay (withdrew)
3. (Netherlands) Jesper de Jong / (Netherlands) Bart Stevens (first round)
4. (Italy) Marco Bortolotti / (Ukraine) Vitaliy Sachko (champions)
5. (Romania) Victor Vlad Cornea / (Germany) Fabian Fallert (final)

== Draw ==
Key

- Q = Qualifier
- WC = Wild card
- LL = Lucky loser
- Alt = Alternate
- ITF = ITF entry
- PR = Protected ranking
- SR = Special ranking
- SE = Special exempt
- JE = Junior exempt
- JR = Junior Accelerator Programme entrant
- CO = College Accelerator Programme entrant
- NG = Next Gen Accelerator Program entrant
- w/o = Walkover
- r = Retired
- d = Defaulted

First round
1	(United States) E King (United States) A Lawson	6	6
WC	(Italy) Riccardo Ercolani (Italy) Simone Vaccari	4	1
Alt	(Bulgaria) P Milushev (Bulgaria) R Shandarov	3	6^{1}
(Netherlands) G Brouwer (Netherlands) J Sels	6	7^{7}
4	(Italy) M Bortolotti (Ukraine) V Sachko	6	6
Alt	(Italy) Matteo Marfia (Italy) Augusto Virgili	0	2
(Germany) H Jebens (Germany) Niklas Schell	7	6
(Canada) A Galarneau (Canada) B Schnur	5	3
WC	(Italy) Lorenzo Angelini (Italy) Christian Capacci	2	1
(Switzerland) L Margaroli (Japan) Y Uchiyama	6	6
(Japan) S Mochizuki (Japan) Yo Watanuki	6	6
3	(Netherlands) J de Jong (Netherlands) B Stevens	4	4
(Germany) J Lenz (Germany) M Moraing	6^{3}	6	[11]
(Italy) F Agamenone (Argentina) JP Ficovich	7^{7}	3	[9]
(United States) A Ritschard (United States) R Stalder	4	3
5	(Romania) VV Cornea (Germany) F Fallert	6	6

Quarterfinals
1	(United States) E King (United States) A Lawson	6	7^{7}
(Netherlands) G Brouwer (Netherlands) J Sels	3	6^{4}
4	(Italy) M Bortolotti (Ukraine) V Sachko	6	4	[10]
(Germany) H Jebens (Germany) N Schell	3	6	[7]
(Switzerland) L Margaroli (Japan) Y Uchiyama	6	3	[10]
(Japan) S Mochizuki (Japan) Yo Watanuki	3	6	[7]
(Germany) J Lenz (Germany) M Moraing	1	6	[6]
5	(Romania) VV Cornea (Germany) F Fallert	6	4	[10]

Semifinals
1	(United States) E King (United States) A Lawson	4	5
4	(Italy) M Bortolotti (Ukraine) V Sachko	6	7
(Switzerland) L Margaroli (Japan) Y Uchiyama	6^{6}	2^{r}
5	(Romania) VV Cornea (Germany) F Fallert	7^{8}	2

Final
4	(Italy) M Bortolotti (Ukraine) V Sachko	7^{7}	3	[10]
5	(Romania) VV Cornea (Germany) F Fallert	6^{5}	6	[5]
