= 2022 Città di Forlì V =

- Date: 21–27 February
- Edition: 7th
- Draw: 32S / 16D
- Surface: Hard (indoor)
- Location: Forlì, Italy

Champions

Singles
- (United Kingdom) Jack Draper

Doubles
- (Italy) Marco Bortolotti / (Ukraine) Vitaliy Sachko
← 2022 ·	Città di Forlì	· 2023 →

The 2022 Città di Forlì V was a professional tennis tournament played on indoor hard courts. It was the seventh edition of the tournament which was part of the 2022 ATP Challenger Tour. It took place in Forlì, Italy between 21 and 27 February 2022.

== Singles main-draw entrants ==
=== Seeds ===
Country	Player	Rank^{1}	Seed
CZE	Tomáš Macháč	115	1
BIH	Damir Džumhur	140	2
ITA	Salvatore Caruso	150	3
GER	Mats Moraing	153	4
FRA	Hugo Grenier	157	5
UKR	Illya Marchenko	160	6
BEL	Zizou Bergs	169	7
ITA	Franco Agamenone	179	8

- ^{1} Rankings as of 14 February 2022.

=== Other entrants ===
The following players received wildcards into the singles main draw:

- (Italy) Matteo Arnaldi
- (Italy) Flavio Cobolli
- (Italy) Stefano Napolitano

The following player received entry into the singles main draw using a protected ranking:

- (Argentina) Juan Pablo Ficovich

The following player received entry into the singles main draw as a special exempt:

- (Netherlands) Tim van Rijthoven

The following player received entry into the singles main draw as an alternate:

- (Canada) Brayden Schnur

The following players received entry from the qualifying draw:

- (Italy) Andrea Arnaboldi
- (Germany) Elmar Ejupovic
- (Italy) Gianmarco Ferrari
- (Italy) Francesco Maestrelli
- (United States) Michael Mmoh
- (United States) Alexander Ritschard

The following player received entry as a lucky loser:

- (Netherlands) Jelle Sels

== Champions ==
=== Singles ===
- (United Kingdom) Jack Draper def. (United States) Alexander Ritschard 3–6, 6–3, 7–6^{(10–8)}.

=== Doubles ===
- (Italy) Marco Bortolotti / (Ukraine) Vitaliy Sachko def. (Romania) Victor Vlad Cornea / (Germany) Fabian Fallert 7–6^{(7–5)}, 3–6, [10–5].
