= 2022 Città di Forlì – Singles =

Singles
- 2022 Città di Forlì

Final
- Champion: (Italy) Luca Nardi
- Runner-up: (India) Mukund Sasikumar
- Score: 6–3, 6–1

Events
Singles	Doubles
- Città di Forlì

Pavel Kotov was the defending champion but chose not to participate.

Luca Nardi won the title after defeating Mukund Sasikumar 6–3, 6–1 in the final.

== Seeds ==
1. (United Kingdom) Jay Clarke (quarterfinals)
2. (Germany) Cedrik-Marcel Stebe (semifinals, withdrew)
3. (United States) Christian Harrison (quarterfinals)
4. (Chinese Taipei) Wu Tung-lin (second round)
5. (United States) Alexander Ritschard (first round)
6. (Portugal) Gonçalo Oliveira (first round)
7. (Hungary) Zsombor Piros (semifinals)
8. (France) Evan Furness (second round)

== Draw ==
Key

- Q = Qualifier
- WC = Wild card
- LL = Lucky loser
- Alt = Alternate
- ITF = ITF entry
- PR = Protected ranking
- SR = Special ranking
- SE = Special exempt
- JE = Junior exempt
- JR = Junior Accelerator Programme entrant
- CO = College Accelerator Programme entrant
- NG = Next Gen Accelerator Program entrant
- w/o = Walkover
- r = Retired
- d = Defaulted

=== Finals ===
Semifinals
7	(Hungary) Zsombor Piros	3	6^{4}
Q	(India) Mukund Sasikumar	6	7^{7}
(Italy) Luca Nardi	w/o
2	(Germany) Cedrik-Marcel Stebe

Final
Q	(India) Mukund Sasikumar	3	1
(Italy) Luca Nardi	6	6

=== Top half ===
First round
1	(United Kingdom) J Clarke	6	6
PR	(Germany) Jeremy Jahn	4	2
(United Kingdom) A McHugh	6	6
WC	(Italy) Lorenzo Angelini	4	0
Q	(Czech Republic) M Vrbenský	6	6
(Italy) M Viola	4	2
(Germany) L Wessels	4	4
7	(Hungary) Z Piros	6	6
4	(Chinese Taipei) T-l Wu	7	5	6
LL	(Bulgaria) A Andreev	5	7	2
(Belgium) M Geerts	1	2
Q	(Morocco) E Benchetrit	6	6
(Italy) F Forti	6^{3}	3
Q	(India) M Sasikumar	7^{7}	6
Q	(Kazakhstan) D Yevseyev	6	6
6	(Portugal) G Oliveira	4	4

Second round
1	(United Kingdom) J Clarke	7^{8}	7^{8}
(United Kingdom) A McHugh	6^{6}	6^{6}
Q	(Czech Republic) M Vrbenský	2	3
7	(Hungary) Z Piros	6	6
4	(Chinese Taipei) T-l Wu	6^{1}	3
Q	(Morocco) E Benchetrit	7^{7}	6
Q	(India) M Sasikumar	6	6
Q	(Kazakhstan) D Yevseyev	3	2

Quarterfinals
1	(United Kingdom) J Clarke	3	3
7	(Hungary) Z Piros	6	6
Q	(Morocco) E Benchetrit	3	6^{5}
Q	(India) M Sasikumar	6	7^{7}

Semifinals
7	(Hungary) Z Piros	3	6^{4}
Q	(India) M Sasikumar	6	7^{7}

=== Bottom half ===
First round
8	(France) E Furness	6	6
(Bosnia and Herzegovina) N Fatić	2	3
(Italy) L Nardi	3	6	6
PR	(Monaco) L Catarina	6	3	2
(Russia) A Vatutin	6^{5}	6	6
(United States) N Chappell	7^{7}	2	2
Q	(Bosnia and Herzegovina) A Šetkić	6	5	6^{3}
3	(United States) C Harrison	2	7	7^{7}
5	(United States) A Ritschard	7	4	6^{8}
WC	(Italy) Luca Potenza	5	6	7^{10}
WC	(Italy) S Napolitano	6^{3}	6	6^{4}
(China) Zh Zhang	7^{7}	3	7^{7}
(Germany) J Lenz	6	6
Alt	(Chinese Taipei) Y-h Hsu	4	4
Q	(Bulgaria) A Lazarov	6^{3}	3
2	(Germany) C-M Stebe	7^{7}	6

Second round
8	(France) E Furness	7^{7}	4	1
(Italy) L Nardi	6^{5}	6	6
(Russia) A Vatutin	0	6	2
3	(United States) C Harrison	6	2	6
WC	(Italy) L Potenza	7	6
(China) Zh Zhang	5	4
(Germany) J Lenz	2	6^{2}
2	(Germany) C-M Stebe	6	7^{7}

Quarterfinals
(Italy) L Nardi	1	7	6
3	(United States) C Harrison	6	5	2
WC	(Italy) L Potenza	5	3
2	(Germany) C-M Stebe	7	6

Semifinals
(Italy) L Nardi	w/o
2	(Germany) C-M Stebe
