= 2022 Città di Forlì IV =

- Date: 14–20 February
- Edition: 6th
- Draw: 32S / 16D
- Surface: Hard (indoor)
- Location: Forlì, Italy

Champions

Singles
- (United Kingdom) Jack Draper

Doubles
- (Romania) Victor Vlad Cornea / (Germany) Fabian Fallert
← 2022 ·	Città di Forlì	· 2022 →

The 2022 Città di Forlì IV was a professional tennis tournament played on indoor hard courts. It was the sixth edition of the tournament which was part of the 2022 ATP Challenger Tour. It took place in Forlì, Italy between 14 and 20 February 2022.

== Singles main-draw entrants ==
=== Seeds ===
Country	Player	Rank^{1}	Seed
FRA	Quentin Halys	139	1
~~ITA~~	~~Salvatore Caruso~~	~~151~~	~~2~~
FRA	Grégoire Barrère	162	3
POR	Nuno Borges	192	4
ITA	Gian Marco Moroni	196	5
JPN	Yasutaka Uchiyama	197	6
NED	Jesper de Jong	202	7
POR	Gastão Elias	203	8

- ^{1} Rankings as of 7 February 2022.

=== Other entrants ===
The following players received wildcards into the singles main draw:

- (Italy) Matteo Arnaldi
- (Italy) Matteo Gigante
- (Italy) Stefano Napolitano

The following players received entry into the singles main draw as alternates:

- (Portugal) João Domingues
- (Italy) Giulio Zeppieri

The following players received entry from the qualifying draw:

- (France) Evan Furness
- (Germany) Benjamin Hassan
- (United States) Emilio Nava
- (Hungary) Zsombor Piros
- (Netherlands) Tim van Rijthoven
- (Japan) Yosuke Watanuki

The following player received entry as a lucky loser:

- (Japan) Hiroki Moriya

== Champions ==
=== Singles ===
- (United Kingdom) Jack Draper def. (Netherlands) Tim van Rijthoven 6–1, 6–2.

=== Doubles ===
- (Romania) Victor Vlad Cornea / (Germany) Fabian Fallert def. (Croatia) Antonio Šančić / (Slovakia) Igor Zelenay 6–4, 3–6, [10–2].
