= 2022 Città di Forlì III =

- Date: 17–23 January
- Edition: 5th
- Draw: 32S / 16D
- Surface: Hard (Indoor)
- Location: Forlì, Italy

Champions

Singles
- (Russia) Pavel Kotov

Doubles
- (Romania) Victor Vlad Cornea / (Germany) Fabian Fallert
← 2022 ·	Città di Forlì	· 2022 →

The 2022 Città di Forlì III was a professional tennis tournament played on indoor hard courts. It was the fifth edition of the tournament which was part of the 2022 ATP Challenger Tour. It took place in Forlì, Italy between 17 and 23 January 2022.

== Singles main-draw entrants ==
=== Seeds ===
Country	Player	Rank^{1}	Seed
CAN	Vasek Pospisil	134	1
FRA	Quentin Halys	153	2
TUR	Cem İlkel	154	3
TUR	Altuğ Çelikbilek	164	4
FRA	Grégoire Barrère	167	5
POL	Kacper Żuk	171	6
GER	Daniel Masur	181	7
SVK	Lukáš Lacko	189	8

- ^{1} Rankings as of 10 January 2022.

=== Other entrants ===
The following players received wildcards into the singles main draw:

- (Italy) Matteo Arnaldi
- (Italy) Stefano Napolitano
- (Italy) Andrea Pellegrino

The following player received entry into the singles main draw using a protected ranking:

- (Italy) ~~Filippo Baldi~~

The following player received entry into the singles main draw as a special exempt:

- (United Kingdom) Jack Draper

The following players received entry into the singles main draw as alternates:

- (Uzbekistan) Denis Istomin
- (Chinese Taipei) Wu Tung-lin

The following players received entry from the qualifying draw:

- (Romania) Marius Copil
- (France) Antoine Escoffier
- (Croatia) Borna Gojo
- (Czech Republic) Lukáš Rosol
- (Russia) Evgenii Tiurnev
- (Japan) Kaichi Uchida

The following player received entry as a lucky loser:

- (France) Evan Furness

== Champions ==
=== Singles ===
- (Russia) Pavel Kotov def. (France) Quentin Halys 7–5, 6–7^{(5–7)}, 6–3.

=== Doubles ===
- (Romania) Victor Vlad Cornea / (Germany) Fabian Fallert def. (Czech Republic) Jonáš Forejtek / (Netherlands) Jelle Sels 6–4, 6–7^{(6–8)}, [10–7].
