= 2022 Città di Forlì =

- Date: 3–9 January
- Edition: 3rd
- Draw: 32S / 16D
- Surface: Hard (indoor)
- Location: Forlì, Italy

Champions

Singles
- (Italy) Luca Nardi

Doubles
- (Italy) Marco Bortolotti / (India) Arjun Kadhe
- Città di Forlì

The 2022 Città di Forlì was a professional tennis tournament played on hard courts. It was the third edition of the tournament which was part of the 2022 ATP Challenger Tour. It took place in Forlì, Italy between 3 and 9 January 2022.

== Singles main-draw entrants ==
=== Seeds ===
Country	Player	Rank^{1}	Seed
GBR	Jay Clarke	215	1
GER	Cedrik-Marcel Stebe	227	2
USA	Christian Harrison	256	3
TPE	Wu Tung-lin	270	4
USA	Alexander Ritschard	276	5
POR	Gonçalo Oliveira	282	6
HUN	Zsombor Piros	288	7
FRA	Evan Furness	290	8

- ^{1} Rankings as of 27 December 2021.

=== Other entrants ===
The following players received wildcards into the singles main draw:

- (Italy) Lorenzo Angelini
- (Italy) Stefano Napolitano
- (Italy) Luca Potenza

The following players received entry into the singles main draw using protected rankings:

- (Monaco) Lucas Catarina
- (Germany) Jeremy Jahn

The following player received entry into the singles main draw as an alternate:

- (Chinese Taipei) Hsu Yu-hsiou

The following players received entry from the qualifying draw:

- (Morocco) Elliot Benchetrit
- (Bulgaria) Alexandar Lazarov
- (India) Mukund Sasikumar
- (Bosnia and Herzegovina) Aldin Šetkić
- (Czech Republic) Michael Vrbenský
- (Kazakhstan) Denis Yevseyev

The following player received entry as a lucky loser:

- (Bulgaria) Adrian Andreev

== Champions ==
=== Singles ===
- (Italy) Luca Nardi def. (India) Mukund Sasikumar 6–3, 6–1.

=== Doubles ===
- (Italy) Marco Bortolotti / (India) Arjun Kadhe def. (Belgium) Michael Geerts / (United States) Alexander Ritschard 7–6^{(7–5)}, 6–2.
