= Fabian Fallert =

German tennis player

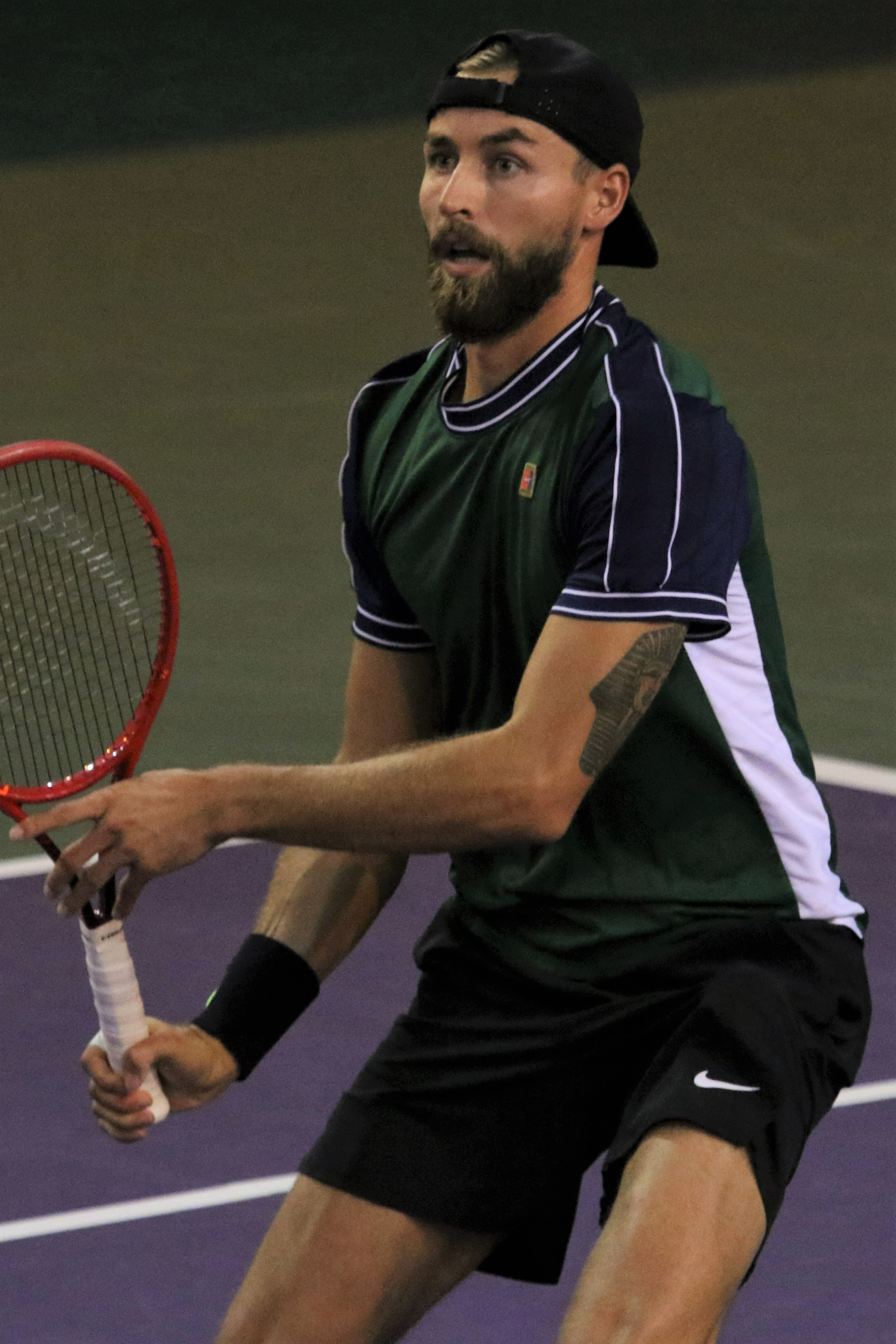
- Fallert at the 2022 Internationaux de Tennis de Vendée
- Country (sports): Germany
- Born: 12 May 1997 (age 29) Bad Urach, Germany
- Height: 1.80 m (5 ft 11 in)
- Plays: Right-handed (two-handed backhand)
- College: University of Mississippi
- Prize money: $47,232

Singles
- Career record: 0–0
- Career titles: 0

Doubles
- Career record: 3–1
- Career titles: 0
- Highest ranking: No. 101 (6 February 2023)
- Last updated on: 27 September 2024.

Fabian Fallert (born 12 May 1997) is a German inactive professional tennis player who specializes in doubles. He has a career high ATP doubles ranking of world No. 101, achieved on 6 February 2023. He has won three ATP Challenger doubles titles.

== Career ==
In his ATP Tour debut, he reached the doubles final of the 2022 Sofia Open with partner Oscar Otte.

== Doubles performance timeline ==
Key
W	F	SF	QF	#R	RR	Q#	DNQ	A	NH

(W) winner; (F) finalist; (SF) semifinalist; (QF) quarterfinalist; (#R) rounds 4, 3, 2, 1; (RR) round-robin stage; (Q#) qualification round; (DNQ) did not qualify; (A) absent; (NH) not held; (SR) strike rate (events won / competed); (W–L) win–loss record.
To avoid confusion and double counting, these charts are updated at the conclusion of a tournament or when the player's participation has ended.

Tournament	2020	2021	2022	2023	2024	SR	W–L
Grand Slam tournaments
Australian Open	A	A	A	A	A	0 / 0	0–0
French Open	A	A	A	A	A	0 / 0	0–0
Wimbledon	A	A	A	A	A	0 / 0	0–0
US Open	A	A	A	A	A	0 / 0	0–0
Win–loss	0–0	0–0	0–0	0–0	0–0	0 / 0	0–0
Career statistics
Tournaments	0	0	1	0	0	1	
Titles	0	0	0	0	0	0	
Finals	0	0	1	0	0	1	
Overall win–loss	0–0	0–0	3–1	0–0	0–0	3–1	
Year-end ranking	420	254	107	367			

== ATP Tour finals ==
=== Doubles: 1 (1 runner-up) ===
Legend Grand Slam (0–0) ATP Masters 1000 (0–0) ATP 500 (0–0) ATP 250 (0–1)	Finals by surface Hard (0–1) Clay (0–0) Grass (0–0)

Result	W–L	Date	Tournament	Tier	Surface	Partner	Opponents	Score
Loss	0–1	Sep 2022	Sofia Open, Bulgaria	ATP 250	Hard (i)	(Germany) Oscar Otte	(Brazil) Rafael Matos (Spain) David Vega Hernández	6–3, 5–7, [8–10]

== ATP Challenger Tour finals ==
=== Doubles: 7 (3–4) ===
Finals by surface
Hard (3–1)
Clay (0–2)
Carpet (0–1)

Result	W–L	Date	Tournament	Surface	Partner	Opponents	Score
Win	1–0	Jan 2022	Forlì III, Italy	Hard (i)	(Romania) Victor Vlad Cornea	(Czech Republic) Jonáš Forejtek (Netherlands) Jelle Sels	6–4, 6–7^{(6–8)}, [10–7]
Win	2–0	Feb 2022	Forlì IV, Italy	Hard (i)	(Romania) Victor Vlad Cornea	(Croatia) Antonio Šančić (Slovakia) Igor Zelenay	6–4, 3–6, [10–2]
Loss	2–1	Feb 2022	Forlì V, Italy	Hard (i)	(Romania) Victor Vlad Cornea	(Italy) Marco Bortolotti (Ukraine) Vitaliy Sachko	6–7^{(5–7)}, 6–3, [5–10]
Loss	2–2	Jul 2022	Lüdenscheid, Germany	Clay	(Germany) Hendrik Jebens	(Netherlands) Robin Haase (Netherlands) Sem Verbeek	2–6, 7–5, [3–10]
Loss	2–3	Aug 2022	Banja Luka, Bosnia	Clay	(Germany) Hendrik Jebens	(Ukraine) Vladyslav Manafov (Ukraine) Oleg Prihodko	3–6, 4–6
Loss	2–4	Oct 2022	Ismaning, Germany	Carpet (i)	(Germany) Hendrik Jebens	(Belgium) Michael Geerts (Finland) Patrik Niklas-Salminen	6–7^{(5–7)}, 6–7^{(8–10)}
Win	3–4	Feb 2023	Koblenz, Germany	Hard (i)	(Germany) Hendrik Jebens	(France) Jonathan Eysseric (Ukraine) Denys Molchanov	7–6^{(7–2)}, 6–3

== ITF Futures/World Tennis Tour finals ==
=== Doubles: 13 (9–4) ===
Finals by surface
Hard (4–3)
Clay (3–1)
Carpet (2–0)

Result	W–L	Date	Tournament	Surface	Partner	Opponents	Score
Win	1–0	Jan 2015	Germany F1, Schwieberdingen	Carpet (i)	(Germany) Florian Fallert	(Romania) Victor Vlad Cornea (Switzerland) Henri Laaksonen	6–4, 6–3
Loss	1–1	Jun 2019	M25 Martos, Spain	Hard	(Germany) Hendrik Jebens	(Spain) Jaume Pla Malfeito (Colombia) Eduardo Struvay	6–4, 3–6, [7–10]
Loss	1–2	Jul 2019	M25 Ajaccio, France	Hard	(Germany) Hendrik Jebens	(France) Yanais Laurent (Brazil) Thiago Seyboth Wild	4–6, 6–1, [8–10]
Win	2–2	Feb 2020	M15 Veigy-Foncenex, France	Carpet (i)	(Germany) Mats Rosenkranz	(Netherlands) Ryan Nijboer (Netherlands) Glenn Smits	6–4, 6–3
Loss	2–3	Feb 2020	M15 Grenoble, France	Hard (i)	(Germany) Hendrik Jebens	(Russia) Artem Dubrivnyy (Czech Republic) Andrew Paulson	6–7^{(4–7)}, 6–3, [7–10]
Win	3–3	Mar 2020	M15 Faro, Portugal	Hard	(United States) Nicolas Moreno de Alboran	(Poland) Michał Dembek (Portugal) Gonçalo Falcão	6–3, 6–4
Win	4–3	Aug 2020	M15 Anif, Austria	Clay	(Germany) Peter Heller	(Austria) Lucas Miedler (Austria) Neil Oberleitner	7–6, 5–7, [11–9]
Win	5–3	Sep 2020	M15 Sintra, Portugal	Hard	(United States) Nicolas Moreno de Alboran	(Russia) Savriyan Danilov (Dominican Republic) Nick Hardt	7–6^{(7–4)}, 6–4
Win	6–3	Oct 2020	M15 Porto, Portugal	Hard	(Germany) Johannes Härteis	(France) Dan Added (France) Sadio Doumbia	6–3, 7–6^{(7–5)}
Win	7–3	Oct 2020	M25 Vale do Lobo, Portugal	Hard	(France) Dan Added	(Russia) Alen Avidzba (Estonia) Kristjan Tamm	6–2, 6–7^{(4–7)}, [10–2]
Win	8–3	Jun 2021	M25 Klosters, Switzerland	Clay	(United States) Nicolas Moreno de Alboran	(Switzerland) Leandro Riedi (Switzerland) Dominic Stricker	4–6, 7–6^{(7–1)}, [10–6]
Win	9–3	Aug 2021	M25 Wetzlar, Germany	Clay	(Germany) Peter Heller	(Colombia) Alejandro Gómez (Germany) Kai Wehnelt	6–3, 7–6^{(7–4)}
Loss	9–4	Aug 2021	M25 Überlingen, Germany	Clay	(Germany) Tim Handel	(Germany) Hendrik Jebens (Germany) Niklas Schell	4–6, 5–7
