= Andrea Arnaboldi =

Italian tennis player (born 1987)

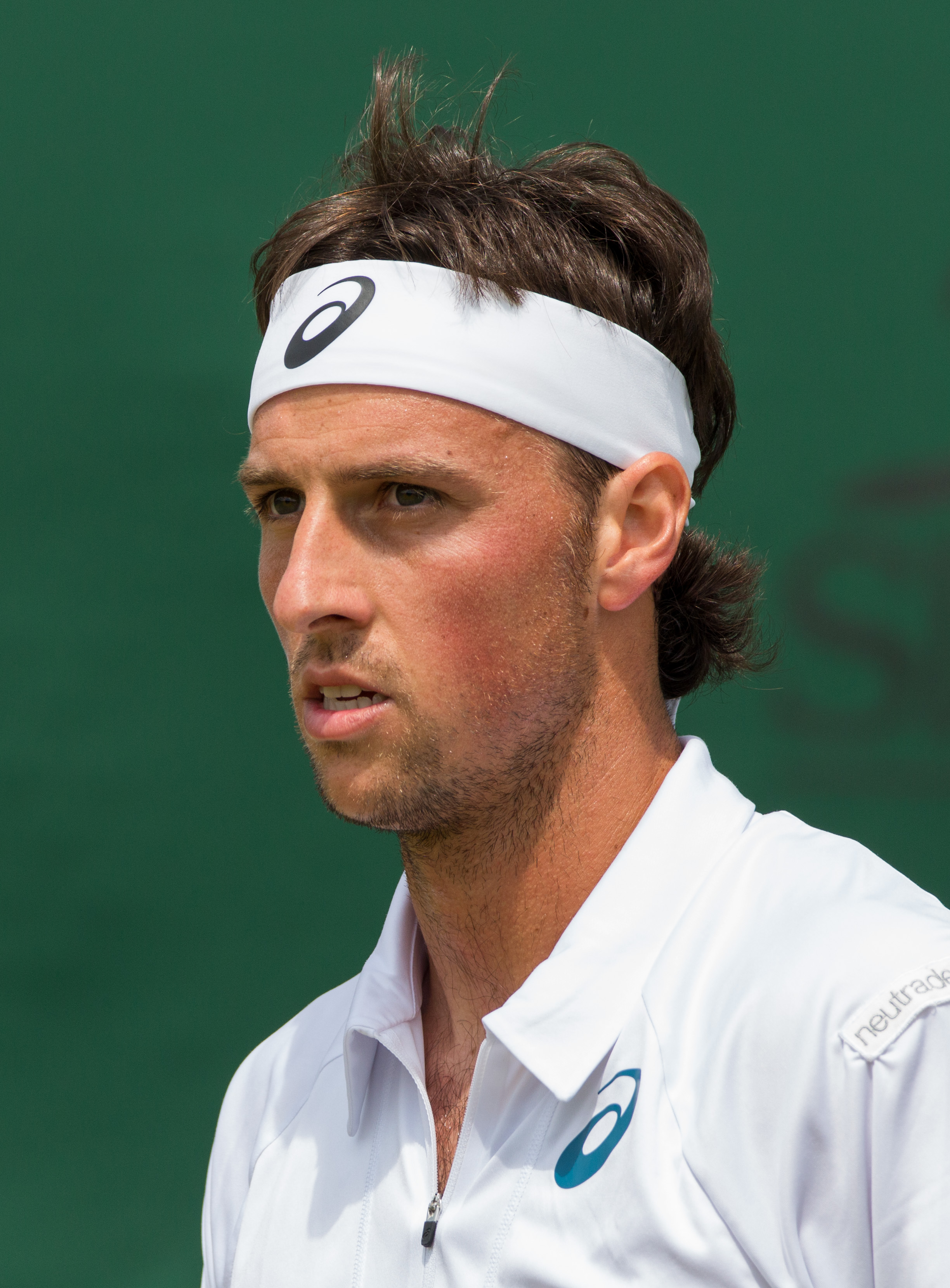
- Country (sports): Italy
- Born: 27 December 1987 (age 38) Milan, Italy
- Height: 1.75 m (5 ft 9 in)
- Turned pro: 2006
- Retired: 2023 (in singles)
- Plays: Left-handed (one-handed backhand)
- Coach: Fabrizio Albani
- Prize money: $1,014,753

Singles
- Career record: 4–10
- Career titles: 0
- Highest ranking: No. 153 (12 October 2015)

Grand Slam singles results
- Australian Open: Q3 (2015)
- French Open: 2R (2015)
- Wimbledon: 1R (2019)
- US Open: Q3 (2013)

Doubles
- Career record: 1–2
- Career titles: 0
- Highest ranking: No. 130 (15 February 2016)
- Last updated on: 31 December 2023.

Andrea Arnaboldi (Italian pronunciation: [anˈdrɛːa arnaˈbɔldi]; born 27 December 1987) is an Italian former tennis player who competed on the ATP Challenger Tour. He advanced to the main draw of the 2014 French Open, 2015 French Open, and 2019 Wimbledon.

== Personal information ==
His cousin Federico Arnaboldi is also a tennis player.

Arnaboldi announced his retirement in December 2023.

== Challenger and Itf Futures ==
=== Singles: 17 (7-10) ===
Legend (singles) ATP Challenger Tour (0-2) ITF Futures Tour (7-8)	Titles by surface Hard (0–3) Clay (7-7) Grass (0–0) Carpet (0–0)

Result	W–L	Date	Tournament	Tier	Surface	Opponent	Score
Loss	0-1	Mar 2006	Italy F4, Siracusa	Futures	Clay	(Italy) Fabio Fognini	3–6, 3–6
Loss	0-2	Jun 2007	Italy F18, Bassano del Grappa	Futures	Clay	(Monaco) Benjamin Balleret	2–6, 1–6
Loss	0-3	Mar 2008	Croatia F3, Poreč	Futures	Clay	(Slovenia) Grega Žemlja	6–7^{(4-7)}, 1–6
Loss	0-4	Jul 2008	Romania F13, Târgu Mureș	Futures	Clay	(Romania) Gabriel Moraru	6–4, 6-7^{(5-7)}, 6-7^{(5-7)}
Loss	0-5	Nov 2008	Spain F41, Vilafranca	Futures	Hard	(Spain) José Checa Calvo	6–4, 4-6, 0-6
Win	1-5	Nov 2008	Spain F43, Maspalomas	Futures	Clay	(Spain) Íñigo Cervantes Huegun	3–6, 6-3, 7-5
Win	2-5	Feb 2009	Spain F5, Cartagena	Futures	Clay	(Spain) Javier Genaro-Martinez	6–2, 1-6, 6-2
Win	3-5	May 2009	Italy F11, Parma	Futures	Clay	(United Kingdom) Morgan Phillips	7–6, 6-3
Loss	3-6	Jul 2010	Italy F15, Bologna	Futures	Clay	(Italy) Andrea Stoppini	1–6, 6-7
Win	4-6	Oct 2011	Italy F31, Biella	Futures	Clay	(France) Julien Obry	6–4, 6-0
Win	5-6	May 2012	Italy F9, Pozzuoli	Futures	Clay	(Italy) Luca Vanni	6–1, 6-4
Win	6-6	May 2012	Spain F13, Getxo	Futures	Clay	(Netherlands) Thiemo de Bakker	3–6, 7-6, 6-4
Loss	6-7	Jun 2012	Italy F12, Parma	Futures	Clay	(Chile) Guillermo Hormazábal	2–6, 7-5, 3-6
Loss	6-8	Jun 2013	Italy F10, Cesena	Futures	Clay	(Argentina) Guido Andreozzi	4–6, 4-6
Win	7-8	Jul 2013	Italy F16, Sassuolo	Futures	Clay	(Italy) Walter Trusendi	7–6^{(7-0)}, 4-6, 6-2
Loss	7-9	Aug 2018	Portoroz, Slovenia	Challenger	Hard	(France) Constant Lestienne	2–6, 1-6
Loss	7-10	Dec 2021	Forli, Italy	Challenger	Hard	(Russia) Pavel Kotov	4–6, 3-6

=== Doubles (8–15) ===
Legend
Grand Slam (0)
ATP Masters Series (0)
ATP Tour (0)
Challengers (2-10)
ITF Tour (6–5)

Outcome	Date	Tournament	Surface	Partner	Opponent	Score
Runner-up	11 July 2004	Hørsholm, Denmark	Clay	(France) Nicolas Tourte	(Denmark) Frederik Nielsen (Denmark) Rasmus Nørby	3–6, 0–6
Winner	21 October 2007	Sfax, Tunisia	Hard	(Tunisia) Walid Jallali	(France) Jonathan Eysseric (France) Jérôme Inzerillo	6–4, 6–2
Winner	13 July 2008	Kramsach, Austria	Clay	(Mexico) Juan Manuel Elizondo	(United States) Matthew Roberts (Austria) Mario Tupy	6–4, 5–7, 10-6
Winner	27 July 2008	Târgu Mureș, Romania	Clay	(Russia) Vladislav Bondarenko	(Moldova) Radu Albot (Moldova) Andrei Ciumac	5–7, 6–0, 10-1
Runner-up	28 September 2008	Bucharest, Romania	Clay	(Argentina) Máximo González	(Spain) Rubén Ramírez Hidalgo (Spain) Santiago Ventura Bertomeu	3–6, 7–5, 6-10
Winner	17 October 2010	Reggio Calabria, Italy	Clay	(Italy) Gianluca Naso	(Romania) Marius Copil (Italy) Giuseppe Faraone	6–4, 6–4
Winner	24 October 2010	Dubrovnik, Croatia	Clay	(United Kingdom) Morgan Phillips	(Italy) Alessandro Giannessi (Austria) Bertram Steinberger	6–4, 6–4
Runner-up	24 April 2011	Padua, Italy	Clay	(Italy) Walter Trusendi	(Croatia) Toni Androić (Croatia) Dino Marcan	4–6, 4–6
Runner-up	19 June 2011	Milan, Italy	Clay	(Portugal) Leonardo Tavares	(Spain) Adrián Menéndez Maceiras (Italy) Simone Vagnozzi	6–0, 3–6, 5-10
Runner-up	16 October 2011	Biella, Italy	Clay	(Italy) Walter Trusendi	(Italy) Fabio Colangelo (Italy) Marco Crugnola	2–6, 6–1, 8-10
Runner-up	19 August 2012	Appiano, Italy	Clay	(Italy) Alessandro Motti	(Bosnia and Herzegovina) Mirza Bašić (Serbia) Nikola Ćirić	3–6, 7–6, 6-10
Runner-up	23 September 2012	Biella, Italy	Clay	(Italy) Matteo Volante	(Italy) Enrico Fioravente (Colombia) Cristian Rodríguez	3–6, 2–6
Runner-up	25 November 2012	Toyota, Japan	Carpet	(Italy) Matteo Viola	(Austria) Philipp Oswald (Croatia) Mate Pavić	3–6, 6–3, 2-10
Winner	12 May 2013	Pula, Italy	Clay	(Italy) Andrea Basso	(Argentina) Leandro Migani (Argentina) Andrés Molteni	6–4, 6–2
Runner-up	7 July 2013	Todi, Italy	Clay	(Italy) Gianluca Naso	(Colombia) Santiago Giraldo (Colombia) Cristian Rodríguez	6–4, 6–7, 3-10
Runner-up	22 September 2013	Szczecin, Poland	Clay	(Italy) Alessandro Giannessi	(United Kingdom) Ken Skupski (United Kingdom) Neal Skupski	4–6, 6–1, 7-10
Runner-up	10 May 2014	Rome, Italy	Clay	(Italy) Flavio Cipolla	(Moldova) Radu Albot (New Zealand) Artem Sitak	6–4, 2–6, 9-11
Runner-up	22 March 2015	Kazan, Russia	Hard	(Italy) Matteo Viola	(Russia) Mikhail Elgin (Slovenia) Igor Zelenay	3–6, 3–6
Winner	26 April 2015	Vercelli, Italy	Clay	(Chile) Hans Podlipnik Castillo	(Belarus) Sergey Betov (Sweden) Andreas Siljeström	6–7, 7–5, 10-3
Runner-up	13 September 2015	Genoa, Italy	Clay	(Italy) Alessandro Giannessi	(Argentina) Guillermo Durán (Argentina) Horacio Zeballos	5–7, 4–6
Winner	18 October 2015	Rennes, France	Hard	(Croatia) Antonio Šančić	(Netherlands) Wesley Koolhof (Netherlands) Matwé Middelkoop	6–4, 2–6, 14-12
Runner-up	18 September 2016	Banja Luka, Bosnia and Herzegovina	Clay	(Austria) Maximilian Neuchrist	(Czech Republic) Roman Jebavý (Czech Republic) Jan Šátral	6–7, 6–4, 7-10
Runner-up	30 October 2016	Suzhou, China	Hard	(France) Jonathan Eysseric	(Russia) Mikhail Elgin (Russia) Alexander Kudryavtsev	6–4, 1–6, 7-10
