= Glenn Smits =

Dutch tennis player

- Country (sports): Netherlands
- Born: 24 October 1990 (age 36) Rotterdam
- Height: 1.98 m (6 ft 6 in)
- Turned pro: 2017
- Plays: right-handed
- Prize money: $27,861

Singles
- Career record: 0–0 (at ATP Tour level, Grand Slam level, and in Davis Cup)
- Career titles: 0
- Highest ranking: No. 1,265 (9 March 2020)

Doubles
- Career record: 0–2 (at ATP Tour level, Grand Slam level, and in Davis Cup)
- Career titles: 5
- Highest ranking: No. 266 (13 December 2021)

Glenn Smits (born 24 October 1990) is a Dutch tennis player.

Smits has a career high ATP doubles In 2022 he achieved his highest ranking (266)

Smits made his ATP main draw debut at the 2015 ABN AMRO World Tennis Tournament in the doubles draw partnering Jesse Huta Galung and in 2017 with Robin Haase.
