= Arjun Kadhe =

Indian tennis player

Arjun Kadhe अर्जुन कढे
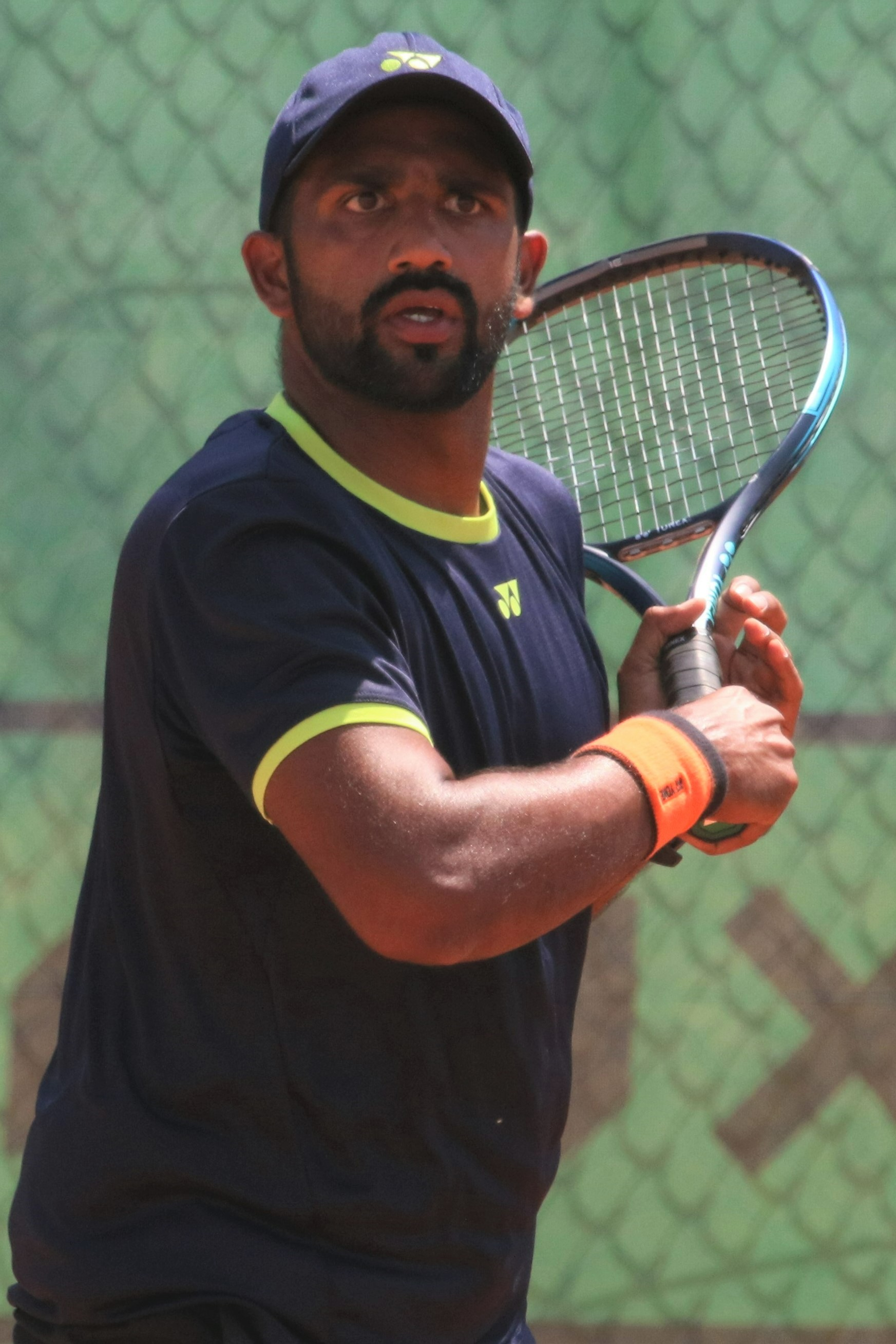
- Kadhe at the 2022 Internationaux de Tennis de Blois
- Country (sports): India
- Residence: Pune, India
- Born: 7 January 1994 (age 32) Pune, India
- Height: 185 cm (6 ft 1 in)
- Turned pro: 2017
- Plays: Right-handed (two-handed backhand)
- College: Oklahoma State University (2014–2017)
- Coach: Hemant Bendrey
- Prize money: $251,558

Singles
- Career record: 0–4
- Career titles: 0
- Highest ranking: No. 328 (27 August 2018)

Doubles
- Career record: 8–10
- Career titles: 1
- Highest ranking: No. 76 (28 October 2024)
- Current ranking: No. 114 (30 June 2025)

Grand Slam doubles results
- Wimbledon: 1R (2025)
- US Open: 1R (2025)
- Last updated on: 30 December 2024.

Arjun Kadhe (Marathi: अर्जुन कढे; born 7 January 1994) is an Indian tennis player who specializes in doubles. He has a career high ATP doubles ranking of world No. 76 achieved on 28 October 2024. He also has a career high singles ranking of No. 328 achieved on 27 August 2018. Kadhe has won one doubles ATP Tour title. He also won 4 ITF Tour singles and 6 ATP Challenger Tour and 7 ITF doubles titles.

== Personal and early life ==
Kadhe was born in Pune to Jayant and Rashmi Kadhe. His father supported him for playing tennis. He attended Vikhe Patil Memorial School through his early studies and was supported and championed as a tennis athlete all throughout his younger years. He attended the Symbiosis College of Arts & Commerce before coming to OSU. He also got support from Maharashtra State Lawn Tennis Association (MSLTA) and Lakshya, a sports NGO. He graduated from Oklahoma State University in 2017. Arjun married his long time partner Kavita Mishra on 13 December 2025. Interestingly, his long-time doubles partner Rithvik Choudary Bollipalli also got married around the same time.

== College career ==
Kadhe became the third Cowboy to ever earn three All-America honors. During his tenure in Oklahoma, Kadhe and his doubles partner Julian Cash became the first doubles team in Oklahoma State history to achieve the top spot in the Intercollegiate Tennis Association Rankings. The pair scripted a team-high 34 wins along with prestigious All-America honours at the NCAA Doubles Championship. He defeated seven ranked opponents in doubles with Cash, two of which came in the NCAA Doubles Tournament. He also won the Pacific Coast Doubles tournament in March while teaming with Cash and reached the quarterfinals of the ITA Central Regional during fall play. He was in sixth place on OSU's career doubles wins list with 67. He clinched 20 singles wins primarily playing at the No. 2 position, including two wins over ranked opponents.

== Professional career ==
He appeared in each of the four Grand Slam tournaments at the junior level over the past two years. Kadhe won his first ITF singles title in November 2017 at Thu Dau Mot City in Vietnam.

He made his singles and doubles ATP Tour debut at the 2018 Maharashtra Open. In singles, he lost in opening round to compatriot Yuki Bhambri. In doubles, he paired with Frenchman Benoît Paire but lost in the first round.

Partnering Rithvik Choudary Bollipalli, Kadhe won his first ATP title at the 2024 Almaty Open, defeating Nicolás Barrientos and Skander Mansouri in the final.

== ATP Tour finals ==
=== Doubles: 1 (1 title) ===
Legend Grand Slam (0–0) ATP Masters 1000 (0–0) ATP 500 Series (0–0) ATP 250 Series (1–0)	Finals by surface Hard (1–0) Clay (0–0) Grass (0–0)

Result	W–L	Date	Tournament	Tier	Surface	Partner	Opponents	Score
Win	1–0	Oct 2024	Almaty Open, Kazakhstan	250 Series	Hard (i)	(India) Rithvik Choudary Bollipalli	(Colombia) Nicolás Barrientos (Tunisia) Skander Mansouri	3–6, 7–6^{(7–3)}, [14–12]

== ATP Challenger and ITF Tour Finals ==
=== Singles: 8 ITF Tour (4–4) ===
Legend (singles) ATP Challenger Tour (0–0) ITF Futures/World Tennis Tour (4–4)	Titles by surface Hard (4–4) Clay (0–0) Grass (0–0) Carpet (0–0)

Result	W–L	Date	Tournament	Tier	Surface	Opponent	Score
Loss	0–1	Sep 2017	India F9, Coimbatore	Futures	Hard	(India) Sasikumar Mukund	3–6, 4–6
Win	1–1	Nov 2017	Vietnam F3, Thu Dau Mot City	Futures	Hard	(Australia) Andrew Harris	7–5, 6–3
Win	2–1	Mar 2018	India F1, Bhubaneswar	Futures	Hard	(India) Vijay Sundar Prashanth	6–3, 6–2
Loss	2–2	Mar 2018	India F2, Kolkata	Futures	Hard	(Spain) Carlos Boluda-Purkiss	0–6, 4–6
Loss	2–3	Mar 2018	India F4, Trivandrum	Futures	Hard	(India) Vijay Sundar Prashanth	3–6, 3–6
Loss	2–4	May 2018	Nigeria F3, Abuja	Futures	Hard	(Brazil) João Menezes	3–6, 1–6
Win	3–4	Mar 2022	M15 Bhopal, India	World Tennis Tour	Hard	(India) Sidharth Rawat	7–6^{(7–2)}, 6–4
Win	4–4	Mar 2022	M15 Bengaluru, India	World Tennis Tour	Hard	(India) Sidharth Rawat	6–3, 3–6, 6–1

=== Doubles: 22 ATP Challenger Tour (8–14) ===
Legend ATP Challenger Tour (8–14)	Titles by surface Hard (7–11) Clay (1–3) Grass (0–0) Carpet (0–0)

Result	W–L	Date	Tournament	Tier	Surface	Partner	Opponents	Score
Loss	0–1	Jul 2018	Astana, Kazakhstan	Challenger	Hard	(Kazakhstan) Denis Yevseyev	(Russia) Mikhail Elgin (Belarus) Yaraslav Shyla	5–7, 6–7^{(6–8)}
Win	1–1	Jul 2019	Chengdu, China	Challenger	Hard	(India) Saketh Myneni	(South Korea) Nam Ji-sung (South Korea) Song Min-kyu	6–3, 0–6, [10–6]
Loss	1–2	Nov 2019	Pune, India	Challenger	Hard	(India) Saketh Myneni	(India) Purav Raja (India) Ramkumar Ramanathan	6–7^{(3–7)}, 3–6
Win	2–2	Jan 2022	Forlì, Italy	Challenger	Hard (i)	(Italy) Marco Bortolotti	(Belgium) Michael Geerts (United States) Alexander Ritschard	7–6^{(7–5)}, 6–2
Win	3–2	Feb 2022	Bangalore, India	Challenger	Hard	(Austria) Alexander Erler	(India) Saketh Myneni (India) Ramkumar Ramanathan	6–3, 6–7^{(4–7)}, [10–7]
Loss	3–3	Sep 2022	Istanbul, Turkey	Challenger	Hard	(Brazil) Fernando Romboli	(India) Purav Raja (India) Divij Sharan	4–6, 6–3, [8–10]
Loss	3–4	Jan 2023	Quimper, France	Challenger	Hard (i)	(India) Anirudh Chandrasekar	(France) Sadio Doumbia (France) Fabien Reboul	2–6, 4–6
Loss	3–5	Feb 2023	Vilnius, Lithuania	Challenger	Hard (i)	(Germany) Daniel Masur	(Belarus) Ivan Liutarevich (Ukraine) Vladyslav Manafov	0–6, 2–6
Win	4–5	Feb 2023	Chennai, India	Challenger	Hard	(United Kingdom) Jay Clarke	(Austria) Sebastian Ofner (Croatia) Nino Serdarušić	6–0, 6–4
Loss	4–6	Jul 2023	Braunschweig, Germany	Challenger	Clay	(India) Rithvik Choudary Bollipalli	(France) Pierre-Hugues Herbert (France) Arthur Reymond	6–7^{(7–9)}, 4–6
Loss	4–7	Jul 2023	Porto, Portugal	Challenger	Hard	(India) Rithvik Choudary Bollipalli	(Japan) Toshihide Matsui (Japan) Kaito Uesugi	7–6^{(7–5)}, 3–6, [5–10]
Win	5–7	Oct 2023	Olbia, Italy	Challenger	Hard	(India) Rithvik Choudary Bollipalli	(Serbia) Ivan Sabanov (Serbia) Matej Sabanov	6–1, 6–3
Loss	5–8	Jan 2024	Oeiras, Portugal	Challenger	Hard (i)	(United Kingdom) Marcus Willis	(Poland) Karol Drzewiecki (Poland) Piotr Matuszewski	3–6, 4–6
Loss	5–9	Mar 2024	Murcia, Spain	Challenger	Clay	(India) Jeevan Nedunchezhiyan	(France) Théo Arribagé (Romania) Victor Vlad Cornea	5–7, 1–6
Win	6–9	Apr 2024	Cuernavaca, Mexico	Challenger	Hard	(India) Jeevan Nedunchezhiyan	(Poland) Piotr Matuszewski (Australia) Matthew Christopher Romios	7–6^{(7–5)}, 6–4
Win	7–9	May 2024	Oeiras, Portugal	Challenger	Clay	(India) Anirudh Chandrasekar	(Sweden) Simon Freund (Denmark) Johannes Ingildsen	7–5, 6–4
Loss	7–10	Sep 2024	Shanghai, China	Challenger	Hard	(India) Rithvik Choudary Bollipalli	(Colombia) Cristian Rodríguez (Australia) Matthew Romios	6–7^{(4–7)}, 6–1, [7–10]
Loss	7–11	Sep 2024	Nonthaburi, Thailand	Challenger	Hard	(India) Rithvik Choudary Bollipalli	(Australia) Blake Ellis (Australia) Adam Walton	6–3, 5–7, [8–10]
Loss	7–12	Oct 2025	Jinan, China	Challenger	Hard	(India) Rithvik Choudary Bollipalli	(Australia) Finn Reynolds (Australia) James Watt	5–7, 6–7^{(1–7)}
Loss	7–13	Mar 2026	Cuernavaca, Mexico	Challenger	Hard	(India) Rithvik Choudary Bollipalli	(Ecuador) Andrés Andrade (Argentina) Federico Agustín Gómez	3–6, 6–7^{(4–7)}
Loss	7–14	Jun 2026	Milan, Italy	Challenger	Clay	(India) Siddhant Banthia	(Italy) Francesco Forti (Italy) Filippo Romano	3–6, 6–7^{(5–7)}
Win	8–14	Sep 2026	Guangzhou, China	Challenger	Hard	(Australia) Blake Bayldon	(Mexico) Miguel Ángel Reyes-Varela (United States) Reese Stalder	7–5, 3–6, [10–7]
