= Città di Forlì =

- 2022 Città di Forlì V

ATP Challenger Tour
- Event name: Città di Forlì
- Location: Forlì, Italy
- Venue: Palatennis- Villa Carpena
- Category: ATP Challenger 50 (2022 (1)); ATP Challenger 80 (2021, 2022 (2-5))
- Surface: Hard (indoor)
- Draw: 32S/24Q/16D
- Prize money: € 45,730 (2022 (5))
- Website: tenniscarpena.it

Current champions (2022 V)
- Singles: (United Kingdom) Jack Draper
- Doubles: (Italy) Marco Bortolotti (Ukraine) Vitaliy Sachko

The Città di Forlì is a professional tennis tournament played on indoor hard courts. It is currently part of the ATP Challenger Tour. It has been held annually in Forlì, Italy, since 2021.

== Past finals ==
=== Singles ===
Year	Champion	Runner-up	Score
2022 (5)	(United Kingdom) Jack Draper (3)	(United States) Alexander Ritschard	3–6, 6–3, 7–6^{(10–8)}
2022 (4)	(United Kingdom) Jack Draper (2)	(Netherlands) Tim van Rijthoven	6–1, 6–2
2022 (3)	(Russia) Pavel Kotov (2)	(France) Quentin Halys	7–5, 6–7^{(5–7)}, 6–3
2022 (2)	(United Kingdom) Jack Draper	(United Kingdom) Jay Clarke	6–3, 6–0
2022 (1)	(Italy) Luca Nardi	(India) Mukund Sasikumar	6–3, 6–1
2021 (2)	(Russia) Pavel Kotov	(Italy) Andrea Arnaboldi	6–4, 6–3
2021 (1)	(United States) Maxime Cressy	(Germany) Matthias Bachinger	6–4, 6–2

=== Doubles ===
Year	Champions	Runners-up	Score
2022 (5)	(Italy) Marco Bortolotti (2) (Ukraine) Vitaliy Sachko	(Romania) Victor Vlad Cornea (Germany) Fabian Fallert	7–6^{(7–5)}, 3–6, [10–5]
2022 (4)	(Romania) Victor Vlad Cornea (2) (Germany) Fabian Fallert (2)	(Croatia) Antonio Šančić (Slovakia) Igor Zelenay	6–4, 3–6, [10–2]
2022 (3)	(Romania) Victor Vlad Cornea (Germany) Fabian Fallert	(Czech Republic) Jonáš Forejtek (Netherlands) Jelle Sels	6–4, 6–7^{(6–8)}, [10–7]
2022 (2)	(France) Sadio Doumbia (France) Fabien Reboul	(Colombia) Nicolás Mejía (United States) Alexander Ritschard	6–2, 6–3
2022 (1)	(Italy) Marco Bortolotti (India) Arjun Kadhe	(Belgium) Michael Geerts (United States) Alexander Ritschard	7–6^{(7–5)}, 6–2
2021 (2)	(Austria) Alexander Erler (Austria) Lucas Miedler	(Italy) Marco Bortolotti (Spain) Sergio Martos Gornés	6–4, 6–2
2021 (1)	(Croatia) Antonio Šančić (Austria) Tristan-Samuel Weissborn	(Czech Republic) Lukáš Rosol (Ukraine) Vitaliy Sachko	7–6^{(7–4)}, 4–6, [10–7]
