= Marco Bortolotti =

Italian tennis player (born 1991)

- Country (sports): Italy
- Residence: Peschiera del Garda, Italy
- Born: 21 January 1991 (age 35) Guastalla, Italy
- Height: 1.73 m (5 ft 8 in)
- Turned pro: 2008
- Retired: 8 November 2025
- Plays: Right-handed (two-handed backhand)
- Coach: Damian Di Noto
- Prize money: US $289,582

Singles
- Career record: 0–0
- Career titles: 0
- Highest ranking: No. 355 (25 April 2016)

Doubles
- Career record: 0–4
- Career titles: 0
- Highest ranking: No. 85 (9 September 2024)

Grand Slam doubles results
- Australian Open: 1R (2025)

Marco Bortolotti (born 21 January 1991) is an Italian former tennis player who specializes in doubles. He has a career-high ATP doubles ranking of world No. 85 achieved on 9 September 2024 and a career-high singles ranking of No. 355 achieved on 25 April 2016. Bortolotti has won nine ATP Challenger doubles titles.

In January 2024, the International Tennis Integrity Agency determined that Bortolotti bore no fault or negligence for testing positive for clostebol in October 2023.

== ATP Challenger titles ==
=== Doubles (7) ===
Legend
Challengers (7)

Result	Date	Category	Tournament	Surface	Partner	Opponents	Score
Win	28 August 2021	Challenger	Barletta, Italy	Clay	(Colombia) Cristian Rodríguez	(Netherlands) Gijs Brouwer (Netherlands) Jelle Sels	6–2, 6–4
Win	16 October 2021	Challenger	Naples, Italy	Clay	(Spain) Sergio Martos Gornés	(Germany) Dustin Brown (Italy) Andrea Vavassori	6–4, 3–6, [10–7]
Win	8 January 2022	Challenger	Forlì, Italy	Hard (i)	(India) Arjun Kadhe	(Belgium) Michael Geerts (United States) Alexander Ritschard	7–6^{(7–5)}, 6–2
Win	26 February 2022	Challenger	Forlì, Italy	Hard (i)	(Ukraine) Vitaliy Sachko	(Romania) Victor Vlad Cornea (Germany) Fabian Fallert	7–6^{(7–5)}, 3–6, [10–5]
Win	13 August 2022	Challenger	San Marino, San Marino	Clay	(Spain) Sergio Martos Gornés	(Serbia) Ivan Sabanov (Serbia) Matej Sabanov	6–4, 6–4
Win	Nov 2023	Challenger	Braga, Portugal	Clay	(Romania) Alexandru Jecan	(Italy) Stefano Travaglia (Italy) Alexander Weis	7–5, 7–5
Win	Nov 2023	Challenger	Maia, Portugal	Clay (i)	(Italy) Andrea Vavassori	(Brazil) Fernando Romboli (Poland) Szymon Walkow	6–4, 3–6, [12–10]
