= Luca Nardi =

Italian tennis player (born 2003)

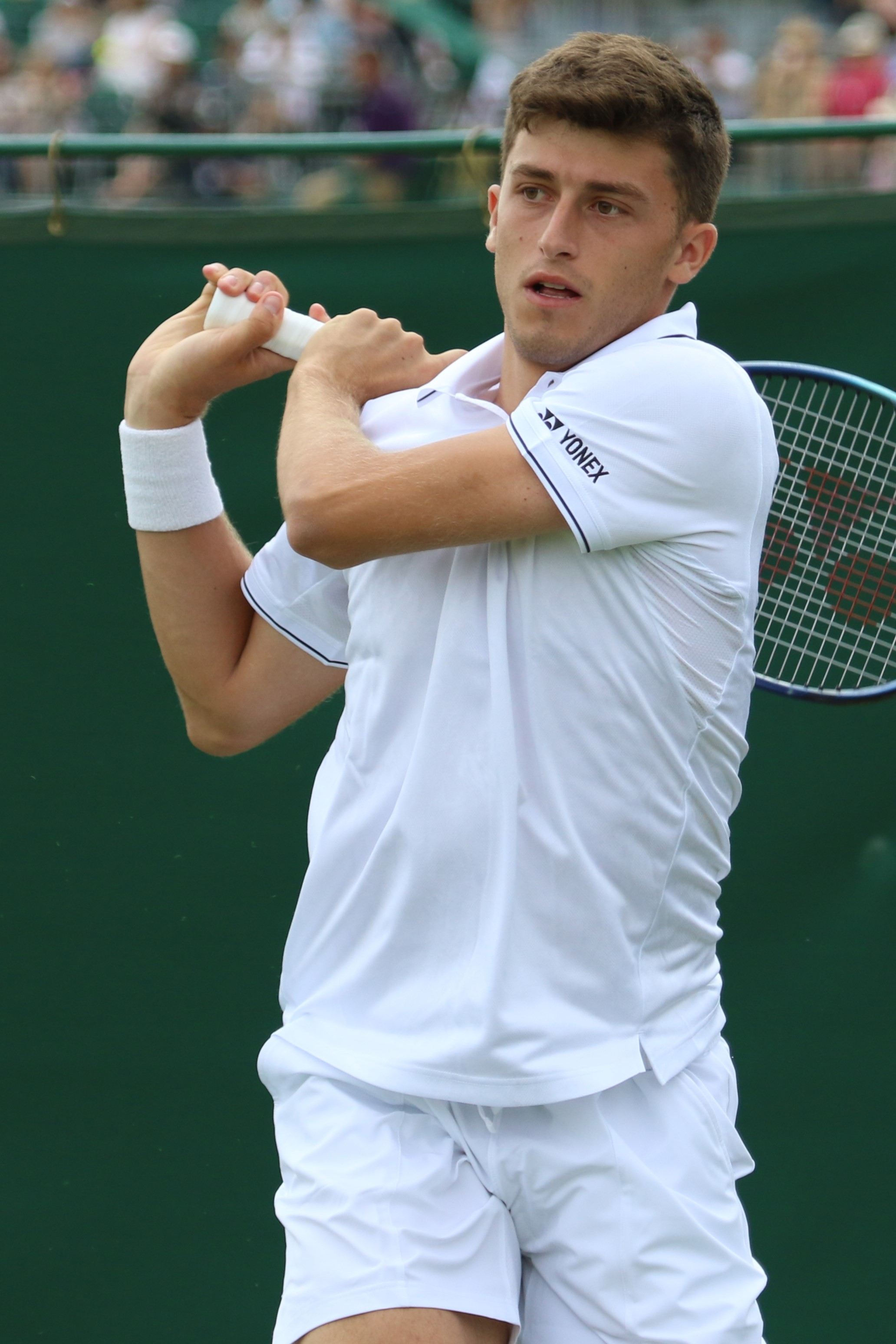
- Nardi at the 2023 Wimbledon Championships
- Country (sports): Italy
- Born: 6 August 2003 (age 23) Pesaro, Italy
- Height: 1.85 m (6 ft 1 in)
- Plays: Right-handed (two-handed backhand)
- Coach: Renzo Furlan (Apr 2026-), Claudio Messina (Mar 2025-); Stefano Pescosolido (2024), Claudio Gallopine (2019-2024), Gabriele Costantini (2021-2023), Francesco Sani (2021-2023)
- Prize money: US $2,065,011

Singles
- Career record: 16–38
- Career titles: 0
- Highest ranking: No. 67 (3 March 2025)
- Current ranking: No. 263 (9 November 2026)

Grand Slam singles results
- Australian Open: 1R (2025, 2026)
- French Open: 1R (2024, 2025)
- Wimbledon: 1R (2024, 2025)
- US Open: 1R (2024, 2025)

Doubles
- Career record: 1–3
- Career titles: 0
- Highest ranking: No. 299 (10 April 2023)
- Last updated on: 11 November 2026.

Luca Nardi (born 6 August 2003) is an Italian professional tennis player. He has a career-high ATP singles ranking of world No. 67 achieved on 3 March 2025. He also has a career-high ATP doubles ranking of world No. 299, attained on 10 April 2023.

Nardi's biggest breakthrough came in 2024, when he defeated World No.1 Novak Djokovic in the third round in Indian Wells, becoming the lowest-ranked player ever to defeat Djokovic at a Masters or a Grand Slam.

== Biography ==
Son of Raffaella and Neapolitan notary Dario, he began playing tennis at seven at the Tennis Club Baratoff in Pesaro, encouraged by his parents and especially his older brother, Niccolò, who later left sports for design studies. He attended a scientific high school in Pesaro for two years before moving in September 2019 to the Federal Technical Center in Tirrenia, where he was coached by Claudio Galoppini, balancing sports with studies. He enjoys soccer and padel, supports Napoli thanks to his father, and idolizes tennis players Roger Federer and Novak Djokovic.

== Career ==
=== 2020–2021: ATP debut ===
Nardi made his ATP main draw debut at the 2020 European Open in singles, where he lost to Marcos Giron in three sets, and in doubles partnering Zane Khan.

He reached career-high rankings of World No. 356 in singles and No. 544 in doubles on 13 December 2021 after reaching the semifinals in singles and quarterfinals in doubles respectively as a wildcard at the 2021 Città di Forlì III Challenger.

=== 2022: Four Challenger titles, Masters & Top 150 debuts & first ATP win ===
In the first week of the 2022 ATP Challenger Tour, Nardi won his first Challenger title at the 2022 Città di Forlì Challenger, defeating Mukund Sasikumar in the final. As a result, he reached the top 300 on 17 January 2022 at world No. 296.

He won his second Challenger title at the 2022 Challenger Città di Lugano, defeating Leandro Riedi in the final. He made his Masters debut at the 2022 Rome Masters as a wildcard.

He won his third Challenger title at the 2022 Rafa Nadal Open in Mallorca, beating Zizou Bergs in the final. This was his first Challenger win on an outdoor hard court. He made his debut in the top 150 at world No. 142 on 12 September 2022.

At the ATP 500 2022 Astana Open he qualified into the main draw defeating top seed David Goffin. He won his first ATP match and first at the ATP 500 tour-level defeating fellow qualifier Alexander Shevchenko to reach the second round. He lost to third seed Stefanos Tsitsipas in very close match with two tiebreaks having had two breakpoints, and conceding none.

=== 2023–2025: Masters fourth round, Win over world No. 1, top 75 ===
Ranked No. 159, he made his debut at the 2023 Monte-Carlo Masters after defeating fourth seed Constant Lestienne and eleventh seed Oscar Otte in the qualifying competition. He won his first round match, recording his first Masters win and only his second on ATP tour-level, over wildcard Valentin Vacherot. He lost by a double bagel to compatriot and 16th seed Lorenzo Musetti in just 50 minutes. Despite the result, he moved more than 15 positions up in the rankings at world No. 143 on 17 April 2023. He received a wildcard for the main draw at the Italian Open, where he lost in the first round to David Goffin in three sets.

In August 2023, he won his fourth Challenger title in Porto on his 20th birthday, defeating Portuguese João Sousa in the final. As a result, he equaled his career high ranking of No. 126 on 7 August 2023 and reached a new career-high ranking of world No. 116 three weeks later. In October 2023, he received a wildcard for the main draw of the 2023 European Open but lost to Dominic Thiem in the first round. He qualified for the 2023 Next Generation ATP Finals.

Ranked No. 123 at the 2024 BNP Paribas Open he replaced as a lucky loser, 30th seed Tomás Martín Etcheverry directly into the second round. He defeated Zhizhen Zhang for his first win at this Masters and reached his first third round at this level. In his next match, he took the first set off world No. 1 Novak Djokovic the first lucky loser to do so at an ATP Masters 1000 event, and the first at an ATP event overall since fellow Italian Lorenzo Sonego in Vienna 2020. He ended up winning that third round match in three sets against the top seed to reach the fourth round for the first time in his career and became the lowest-ranked player ever to defeat Djokovic at a Masters or a Grand Slam. As a result he made his top 100 debut in the rankings.

He won his sixth Challenger title at home soil at the 2024 Tennis Napoli Cup after defeating Pierre-Hugues Herbert in three sets. Nardi passed first round at home Masters 1000 event in Rome, where he beat Daniel Altmaier, before losing to 10th seed Holger Rune. Nardi made his Grand Slam tournament debut at the 2024 French Open, but lost in the first round to Alexandre Müller. In November 2024, Nardi reached the final at the ATP Challenger HPP Open in Helsinki, Finland, losing to Kei Nishikori in the final in three sets.

He was runner-up at the 2025 Koblenz Challenger, losing to Ugo Blanchet in the final which went to a deciding set tiebreak. Again as a lucky loser, Nardi reached the quarterfinals at the ATP 500 2025 Dubai Tennis Championships defeating Zizou Bergs.

== Performance timelines ==
Key
W	F	SF	QF	#R	RR	Q#	DNQ	A	NH

(W) winner; (F) finalist; (SF) semifinalist; (QF) quarterfinalist; (#R) rounds 4, 3, 2, 1; (RR) round-robin stage; (Q#) qualification round; (DNQ) did not qualify; (A) absent; (NH) not held; (SR) strike rate (events won / competed); (W–L) win–loss record.
To avoid confusion and double counting, these charts are updated at the conclusion of a tournament or when the player's participation has ended.

=== Singles ===
Current through the 2026 US Open.

Tournament	2020	2021	2022	2023	2024	2025	2026	SR	W–L	Win %
Grand Slam tournaments
Australian Open	A	A	A	Q1	Q2	1R	1R	0 / 1	0–2	0%
French Open	A	A	Q3	Q1	1R	1R	A	0 / 2	0–2	0%
Wimbledon	NH	A	A	Q2	1R	1R	Q2	0 / 2	0–2	0%
US Open	A	A	Q1	Q1	1R	1R	Q1	0 / 2	0–2	0%
Win–loss	0–0	0–0	0–0	0–0	0–3	0–4	0–1	0 / 7	0–8	0%
ATP Tour Masters 1000
Indian Wells	NH	A	A	A	4R	1R	Q1	0 / 2	2–2	50%
Miami Open	NH	A	A	A	Q1	Q1	A	0 / 0	0–0	–
Monte-Carlo Masters	NH	A	A	2R	1R	Q1	A	0 / 2	1–2	33%
Madrid Open	NH	A	A	Q1	A	Q2	A	0 / 0	0–0	–
Italian Open	A	A	1R	1R	2R	2R	1R	0 / 5	2–5	29%
Canadian Open	NH	A	A	A	A	A	A	0 / 0	0–0	–
Cincinnati Open	A	A	A	A	A	4R	A	0 / 1	3–1	75%
Shanghai Masters	NH			A	1R	2R	A	0 / 2	1–2	33%
Win–loss	0–0	0–0	0–1	1–2	3–4	5–4	0–1	0 / 12	9–12	43%
Career statistics
	2020	2021	2022	2023	2024	2025	2026	SR	W–L	Win %
Tournaments	1	0	4	6	12	14	4	Career total: 41		
Titles	0	0	0	0	0	0	0	Career total: 0		
Finals	0	0	0	0	0	0	0	Career total: 0		
Hard win–loss	0–1	0–0	1–2	1–4	2–5	8–10	2–3	0 / 24	14–25	36%
Clay win–loss	0–0	0–0	0–2	1–3	1–4	1–3	0–1	0 / 13	3–13	19%
Grass win–loss	0–0	0–0	0–0	0–0	1–3	0–1	0–0	0 / 4	1–4	20%
Overall win–loss	0–1	0–0	1–4	2–7	4–12	9–14	2–4	0 / 41	18–42	30%
Win %	0%	–	20%	22%	25%	39%	33%	30%		
Year-end ranking	787	364	135	118	92	107		$2,433,688		

== ATP Challenger and ITF World Tennis Tour finals ==
=== Singles: 16 (10 titles, 6 runners-up) ===
Legend ATP Challenger Tour (7–5) ITF WTT (3–1)	Finals by surface Hard (7–5) Clay (3–1) Grass (0–0) Carpet (0–0)

Result	W–L	Date	Tournament	Tier	Surface	Opponent	Score
Win	1–0	Mar 2020	M15 Sharm El Sheikh, Egypt	WTT	Hard	(Czech Republic) Jaroslav Pospíšil	5–7, 6–4, 7–6^{(7–5)}
Win	2–0	Jun 2021	M15 Genova, Italy	WTT	Clay	(Switzerland) Johan Nikles	6–4, 6–2
Loss	2–1	Jul 2021	M15 Perugia, Italy	WTT	Clay	(Italy) Andrea Basso	3–6, 6–4, 6–7^{(3–7)}
Win	3–1	Sep 2021	M25 Madrid, Spain	WTT	Clay	(Germany) Louis Wessels	7–5, 6–2
Win	1–0	Jan 2022	Forlì, Italy	Challenger	Hard (i)	(India) Mukund Sasikumar	6–3, 6–1
Win	2–0	Mar 2022	Lugano, Switzerland	Challenger	Hard (i)	(Switzerland) Leandro Riedi	4–6, 6–2, 6–3
Win	3–0	Aug 2022	Manacor, Spain	Challenger	Hard	(Belgium) Zizou Bergs	7–6^{(7–2)}, 3–6, 7–5
Loss	3–1	Feb 2023	Pune, India	Challenger	Hard	(Australia) Max Purcell	2–6, 3–6
Win	4–1	Jul 2023	Porto, Portugal	Challenger	Hard	(Portugal) João Sousa	5–7, 6–4, 6–1
Win	5–1	Nov 2023	Matsuyama, Japan	Challenger	Hard	(Japan) Taro Daniel	3–6, 6–4, 6–2
Loss	5–2	Feb 2024	Chennai, India	Challenger	Hard	(India) Sumit Nagal	1–6, 4–6
Win	6–2	Mar 2024	Naples, Italy	Challenger	Clay	(France) Pierre-Hugues Herbert	5–7, 7–6^{(7–3)}, 6–2
Loss	6–3	Nov 2024	Helsinki, Finland	Challenger	Hard (i)	(Japan) Kei Nishikori	6–3, 4–6, 1–6
Win	7–3	Nov 2024	Rovereto, Italy	Challenger	Hard (i)	(Italy) Francesco Maestrelli	6–1, 6–3
Loss	7–4	Jan 2025	Koblenz, Germany	Challenger	Hard (i)	(France) Ugo Blanchet	3–6, 6–3, 6–7^{(5–7)}
Loss	7–5	Jan 2026	Manama, Bahrain	Challenger	Hard	(France) Kyrian Jacquet	5–7, 6–3, 4–6

=== Doubles: 1 (1 title) ===
Legend ATP Challenger Tour (0–0) ITF WTT (1–0)

Result	W–L	Date	Tournament	Tier	Surface	Partner	Opponents	Score
Win	1–0	Mar 2021	M15 Sharm El Sheikh, Egypt	WTT	Hard	(Italy) Jacopo Berrettini	(Japan) Shintaro Imai (Chinese Taipei) Hsu Yu-hsiou	6–3, 2–6, [10–7]

== Wins over top 10 players ==
- Nardi has a 1–5 record against players who were, at the time the match was played, ranked in the top 10.

Season	2024	2025	2026	Total
Wins	1	0	0	1

#	Player	Rank	Event	Surface	Rd	Score	LNR
2024
1.	(Serbia) Novak Djokovic	1	Indian Wells Open, United States	Hard	3R	6–4, 3–6, 6–3	123

*As of 19 February 2025
