= Pavel Kotov =

Russian tennis player (born 1998)

Pavel Kotov Павел Котов
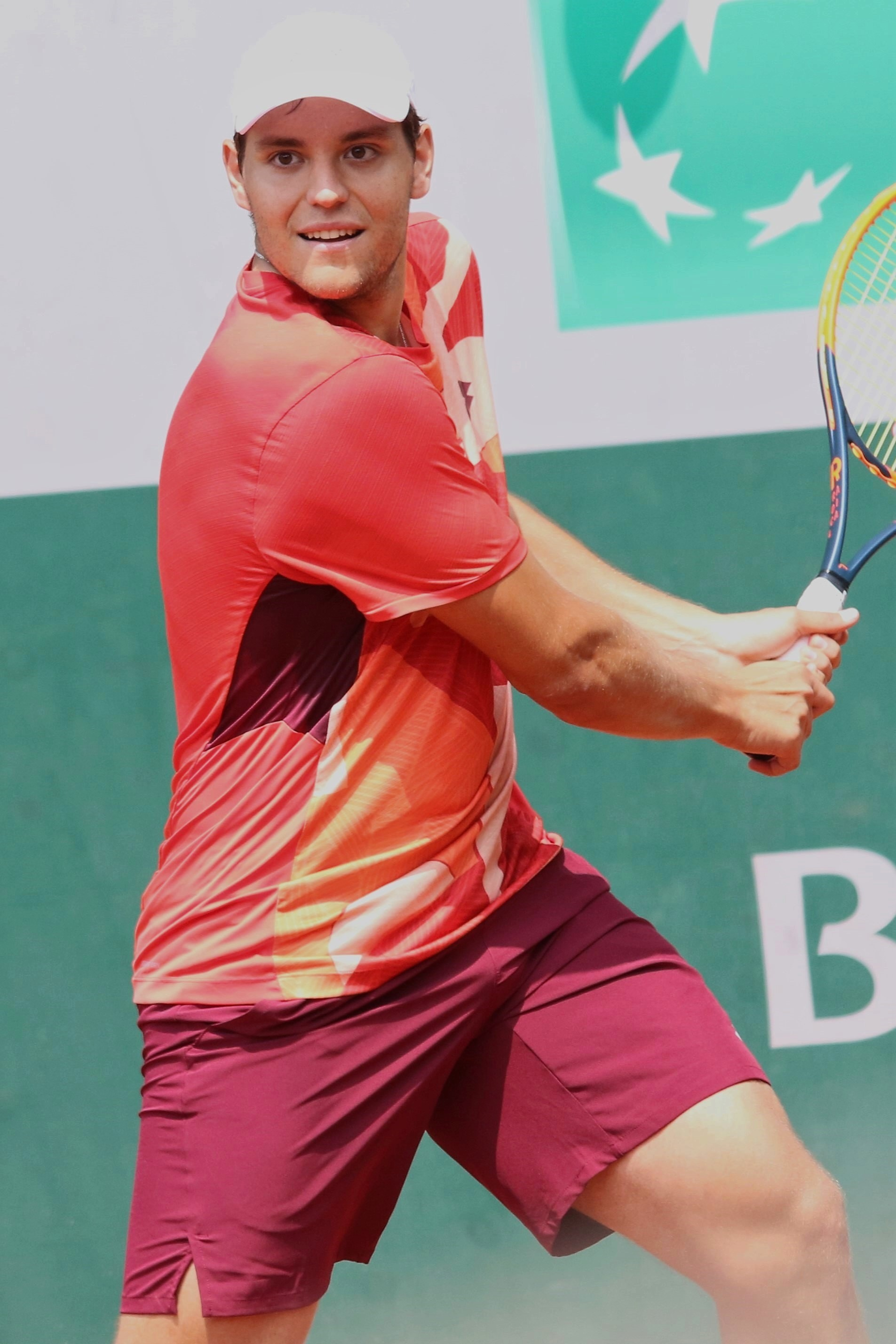
- Kotov at the 2023 French Open
- Full name: Pavel Vyacheslavovich Kotov
- Country (sports): Russia
- Born: 18 November 1998 (age 27) Moscow, Russia
- Height: 1.91 m (6 ft 3 in)
- Turned pro: 2016
- Plays: Right-handed (two-handed backhand)
- Coach: Lilyia Kotova, Denis Stepanenko, Ivan Polyakov (-2023), Igor Chelyshev (-2024)
- Prize money: US $2,174,192

Singles
- Career record: 36–46
- Career titles: 6 Challenger
- Highest ranking: No. 50 (17 June 2024)
- Current ranking: No. 187 (5 October 2026)

Grand Slam singles results
- Australian Open: 2R (2024)
- French Open: 3R (2024)
- Wimbledon: 1R (2024)
- US Open: 1R (2022, 2023, 2024)

Other tournaments
- Olympic Games: 1R (2024)

Doubles
- Career record: 2–11
- Career titles: 0
- Highest ranking: No. 226 (8 November 2021)

Grand Slam doubles results
- Wimbledon: 1R (2024)
- US Open: 1R (2024)
- Last updated on: 16 March 2026.

Pavel Vyacheslavovich Kotov (Russian: Павел Вячеславович Котов, IPA: [ˈpavʲɪl ˈkotəf]; born 18 November 1998) is a Russian professional tennis player. He has a career-high ATP singles ranking of world No. 50, achieved on 17 June 2024 and a best doubles ranking of No. 226, achieved on 8 November 2021.

== Career ==
=== 2020–2021: ATP debut, Maiden Challengers in singles & doubles ===
Kotov made his ATP debut at the 2020 St. Petersburg Open as a qualifier where he was defeated by Ugo Humbert.

The Russian won his maiden ATP Challenger doubles title at the 2020 Challenger La Manche and maiden single title at the 2021 Città di Forlì III.

=== 2022: First ATP win, Grand Slam and top 100 debuts ===
Kotov won his first ATP match at the 2022 Grand Prix Hassan II as a qualifier defeating ninth seed Tallon Griekspoor. He won his second singles Challenger title at 2022 Città di Forlì III. He reached the top 150 on 16 May 2022 at World No. 143.

At the 2022 French Open, Kotov qualified to make his Grand Slam main draw debut.

Kotov made his debut at the 2022 US Open as a qualifier.

The Russian qualified into the main draw at the ATP 500 2022 Astana Open as lucky loser after the late withdrawal of Jannik Sinner. In the first round he defeated Alejandro Davidovich Fokina for his first win at this level. As a result he moved to the top 100 in the rankings on 10 October 2022.

=== 2023: Masters debuts, first ATP final, top 70 ===
Kotov made his debut at the 2023 Australian Open as a lucky loser. He also qualified at the ATP 500 in Dubai and defeated Alexei Popyrin. He made his Masters 1000 debut at the 2023 Miami Open as a qualifier.

At the 2023 Grand Prix Hassan II in Marrakesh, Morocco, Kotov reached his first ATP semifinal defeating Pedro Martínez, seventh seed Benjamin Bonzi and Christopher O'Connell. He also made his debut at the 2023 Mutua Madrid Open as a lucky loser.

In Stockholm as a qualifier, he defeated seventh seed Christopher Eubanks, Lorenzo Sonego, third seed Tallon Griekspoor and Miomir Kecmanović to reach his first ATP final, which he lost to Gaël Monfils in three sets. In Sofia, he reached a back to back semifinal and third of the season, defeating Márton Fucsovics and moved into the top 70 in the rankings.

=== 2024: First Grand Slam and Masters wins, top 50 ===
Ranked No. 64, at the 2024 Australian Open, he defeated Arthur Rinderknech in the first round, for his first Major win.

In Marrakesh, he reached back-to-back semifinals at the tournament, defeating local wildcard Elliot Benchetrit and Italians Flavio Cobolli and qualifier Fabio Fognini.

Kotov recorded his first two Masters wins at the 2024 Mutua Madrid Open where he reached the third round at this level for the first time with wins over Albert Ramos Viñolas and Jordan Thompson. He recorded also his first two wins at the 2024 French Open where he upset 32nd seed Cameron Norrie in five sets and Stan Wawrinka in four. As a result he reached the top 50 on 17 June 2024.

=== 2025: Injury and ranking decline ===
At the 2025 Australian Open, Kotov lost in the first round to qualifier Jaime Faria in straight sets. His season was affected by a wrist injury, and he finished the year ranked world No. 465.

=== 2026: Three Challenger titles ===
In February, Kotov won his fourth ATP Challenger Tour title at the Koblenz Open, saving two championship points before defeating Tom Gentzsch in the final. He won further titles in Cherbourg in March and Wuning in April, becoming the first player to win three Challenger titles that season. In September, he reached the final of the Guangzhou Challenger, where he lost to Marat Sharipov.

In October, Kotov qualified for the Shanghai Masters, where he defeated Tallon Griekspoor in straight sets to advance to the second round.

== Performance timelines ==
Key
W	F	SF	QF	#R	RR	Q#	P#	DNQ	A	Z#	PO	G	S	B	NMS	NTI	P	NH

(W) winner; (F) finalist; (SF) semifinalist; (QF) quarterfinalist; (#R) rounds 4, 3, 2, 1; (RR) round-robin stage; (Q#) qualification round; (P#) preliminary round; (DNQ) did not qualify; (A) absent; (Z#) Davis/Fed Cup Zonal Group (with number indication) or (PO) play-off; (G) gold, (S) silver or (B) bronze Olympic/Paralympic medal; (NMS) not a Masters tournament; (NTI) not a Tier I tournament; (P) postponed; (NH) not held; (SR) strike rate (events won / competed); (W–L) win–loss record.
To avoid confusion and double counting, these charts are updated at the conclusion of a tournament or when the player's participation has ended.

=== Singles ===
Tournament	2022	2023	2024	2025	2026	SR	W–L	Win %
Grand Slam tournaments
Australian Open	A	1R	2R	1R	A	0 / 1	1–3	25%
French Open	1R	Q1	3R	Q1	A	0 / 2	2–2	50%
Wimbledon	A	A	1R	Q1	A	0 / 1	0–1	0%
US Open	1R	1R	1R	A	A	0 / 3	0–3	0%
Win–loss	0–2	0–2	3–4	0–1	0-0	0 / 9	3–9	25%
Tour Masters 1000
Indian Wells Masters	A	Q1	1R	Q2	A	0 / 1	0–1	0%
Miami Open	A	1R	1R	Q2	A	0 / 2	0–2	0%
Monte Carlo Masters	A	A	A	A	A	0 / 0	0–0	–
Madrid Open	A	1R	3R	Q1	A	0 / 2	2–2	50%
Italian Open	A	A	2R	Q1	A	0 / 1	1–1	50%
Canadian Open	A	A	A	A	A	0 / 0	0–0	–
Cincinnati Masters	A	A	A	A	A	0 / 0	0–0	–
Shanghai Masters	NH	1R	1R	A		0 / 2	0–2	0%
Paris Masters	A	A	Q1	A		0 / 0	0–0	–
Win–loss	0–0	0–3	3–5	0–0	0-0	0 / 8	3–8	27%

== ATP Tour finals ==
=== Singles: 1 (runner-up) ===
Legend Grand Slam (–) ATP 1000 (–) ATP 500 (–) ATP 250 (0–1)	Finals by surface Hard (0–1) Clay (–) Grass (–)	Finals by setting Outdoor (–) Indoor (0–1)

Result	W–L	Date	Tournament	Tier	Surface	Opponent	Score
Loss	0–1	Oct 2023	Stockholm Open, Sweden	ATP 250	Hard (i)	(France) Gaël Monfils	6–4, 6–7^{(6–8)}, 3–6

== ATP Challenger Tour finals ==
=== Singles: 9 (6 titles, 3 runner-ups) ===
Legend ATP Challenger Tour (6–3)	Finals by surface Hard (5–2) Clay (1–1)

Result	W–L	Date	Tournament	Tier	Surface	Opponent	Score
Loss	0–1	Aug 2019	Open Castilla y León, Spain	Challenger	Hard	(Spain) Nicola Kuhn	2–6, 6–7^{(4–7)}
Win	1–1	Dec 2021	Città di Forlì III, Italy	Challenger	Hard (i)	(Italy) Andrea Arnaboldi	6–4, 6–3
Win	2–1	Jan 2022	Città di Forlì III, Italy (2)	Challenger	Hard (i)	(France) Quentin Halys	7–5, 6–7^{(5–7)}, 6–3
Win	3–1	Aug 2022	San Marino Open, San Marino	Challenger	Clay	(Italy) Matteo Arnaldi	7–6^{(7–5)}, 6–4
Loss	3–2	Jul 2023	Brawo Open, Germany	Challenger	Clay	(Italy) Franco Agamenone	5–7, 3–6
Win	4–2	Feb 2026	Koblenz Open, Germany	Challenger	Hard (i)	(Germany) Tom Gentzsch	6–4, 1–6, 7–6^{(10–8)}
Win	5–2	Mar 2026	Challenger La Manche, France	Challenger	Hard (i)	(Italy) Filippo Romano	6–2, 7–5
Win	6–2	Apr 2026	Wuning Challenger, China	Challenger	Hard	(United Kingdom) Harry Wendelken	4-6, 6-3, 6-4
Loss	6–3	Sep 2026	Guangzhou Open, China	Challenger	Hard	Marat Sharipov	0–6, 3–6

=== Doubles: 3 (1 title, 2 runner-ups) ===
Legend ATP Challenger Tour (1–2)

Result	W–L	Date	Tournament	Tier	Surface	Partner	Opponents	Score
Loss	0–1	Nov 2019	Tali Open, Finland	Challenger	Hard (i)	(Croatia) Tomislav Draganja	(Denmark) Frederik Nielsen (Germany) Tim Pütz	6–7^{(2–7)}, 0–6
Win	1–1	Feb 2020	Challenger La Manche, France	Challenger	Hard (i)	(Russia) Roman Safiullin	(France) Dan Added (France) Albano Olivetti	7–6^{(8–6)}, 5–7, [12–10]
Loss	1–2	Apr 2021	Open de Oeiras II, Portugal	Challenger	Clay	(Chinese Taipei) Tseng Chun-hsin	(Portugal) Nuno Borges (Portugal) Francisco Cabral	1–6, 2–6

== ITF Tour finals ==
=== Singles: 5 (3 titles, 2 runner-ups) ===
Legend ITF Futures/WTT (3–2)	Finals by surface Hard (3–0) Clay (0–2)

Result	W–L	Date	Tournament	Tier	Surface	Opponent	Score
Win	1–0	Jul 2017	Russia F3, Kazan	Futures	Hard	(Russia) Yan Sabanin	6–2, 6–3
Win	2–0	Jul 2017	Russia F4, Kazan	Futures	Hard	(Kazakhstan) Denis Yevseyev	7–6^{(7–5)}, 6–2
Win	3–0	Nov 2017	Czech Republic F11, Valašské Meziříčí	Futures	Hard (i)	(France) Dan Added	6–0, 7–5
Loss	3–1	Apr 2018	Kazakhstan F4, Shymkent	Futures	Clay	(Kazakhstan) Denis Yevseyev	5–7, 1–6
Loss	3–2	Dec 2019	M15 Antalya, Turkey	WTT	Clay	(Serbia) Miljan Zekić	6–3, 4–6, 6–7^{(4–7)}
