= 2023 Salzburg Open – Doubles =

Doubles
- 2023 Salzburg Open

Final
- Champions: (Kazakhstan) Andrey Golubev (Ukraine) Denys Molchanov
- Runners-up: (India) Anirudh Chandrasekar (India) Vijay Sundar Prashanth
- Score: 6–4, 7–6^{(10–8)}

Events
Singles	Doubles
← 2022 ·	Salzburg Open	· 2024 →

Nathaniel Lammons and Jackson Withrow were the defending champions but chose not to defend their title.

Andrey Golubev and Denys Molchanov won the title after defeating Anirudh Chandrasekar and Vijay Sundar Prashanth 6–4, 7–6^{(10–8)} in the final.

== Seeds ==
1. (Serbia) Nikola Ćaćić / (Romania) Victor Vlad Cornea (semifinals)
2. (Argentina) Guido Andreozzi / (Argentina) Guillermo Durán (first round)
3. (Kazakhstan) Andrey Golubev / (Ukraine) Denys Molchanov (champions)
4. (India) Anirudh Chandrasekar / (India) Vijay Sundar Prashanth (final)

== Draw ==
=== Key ===
- Q = Qualifier
- WC = Wild card
- LL = Lucky loser
- Alt = Alternate
- ITF = ITF entry
- PR = Protected ranking
- SR = Special ranking
- SE = Special exempt
- JE = Junior exempt
- JR = Junior Accelerator Programme entrant
- CO = College Accelerator Programme entrant
- NG = Next Gen Accelerator Program entrant
- w/o = Walkover
- r = Retired
- d = Defaulted

First round
1	(Serbia) N Ćaćić (Romania) VV Cornea	6	6
(Bosnia and Herzegovina) D Džumhur (Bosnia and Herzegovina) N Fatić	1	4
(Austria) N Oberleitner (Germany) T Sandkaulen	7^{7}	7^{12}
(Slovakia) M Karol (Ukraine) V Orlov	6^{1}	6^{10}
3	(Kazakhstan) A Golubev (Ukraine) D Molchanov	6^{6}	7^{7}	[10]
(Australia) MC Romios (Australia) J Taylor	7^{8}	6^{3}	[5]
WC	(Austria) Peter Goldsteiner (Austria) Niklas Waldner	w/o
(Argentina) A Collarini (Switzerland) A Ritschard
(Czech Republic) R Jebavý (Slovakia) I Zelenay	6	6
(Canada) JC Aguilar (Argentina) A Barrena	4	3
WC	(Austria) Benedikt Emesz (Austria) Matthias Ujvary	0	1
4	(India) A Chandrasekar (India) VS Prashanth	6	6
(Sweden) F Bergevi (Norway) V Durasovic	3	4
(France) M Guinard (India) S Nagal	6	6
(Austria) M Neuchrist (Austria) L Neumayer	7^{7}	6
2	(Argentina) G Andreozzi (Argentina) G Durán	6^{1}	3

Quarterfinals
1	(Serbia) N Ćaćić (Romania) VV Cornea	4	6	[10]
(Austria) N Oberleitner (Germany) T Sandkaulen	6	3	[4]
3	(Kazakhstan) A Golubev (Ukraine) D Molchanov	6	6
WC	(Austria) P Goldsteiner (Austria) N Waldner	3	3
(Czech Republic) R Jebavý (Slovakia) I Zelenay	6^{4}	4
4	(India) A Chandrasekar (India) VS Prashanth	7^{7}	6
(France) M Guinard (India) S Nagal	6	6
(Austria) M Neuchrist (Austria) L Neumayer	4	3

Semifinals
1	(Serbia) N Ćaćić (Romania) VV Cornea	2	6^{1}
3	(Kazakhstan) A Golubev (Ukraine) D Molchanov	6	7^{7}
4	(India) A Chandrasekar (India) VS Prashanth	6	6
(France) M Guinard (India) S Nagal	2	2

Final
3	(Kazakhstan) A Golubev (Ukraine) D Molchanov	6	7^{10}
4	(India) A Chandrasekar (India) VS Prashanth	4	6^{8}
