= 2021 ATP Salzburg Open – Singles =

Singles
- 2021 ATP Salzburg Open

Final
- Champion: (Argentina) Facundo Bagnis
- Runner-up: (Argentina) Federico Coria
- Score: 6–4, 3–6, 6–2

Events
| Singles | Doubles |
| Salzburg Open | · 2022 → |

This was the first edition of the tournament.

Facundo Bagnis won the title after defeating Federico Coria 6–4, 3–6, 6–2 in the final.

== Seeds ==
1. (Brazil) Thiago Monteiro (first round)
2. (Uruguay) Pablo Cuevas (quarterfinals)
3. (Argentina) Federico Coria (final)
4. (Argentina) Facundo Bagnis (champion)
5. (Spain) Roberto Carballés Baena (second round)
6. (Japan) Taro Daniel (first round)
7. (Colombia) Daniel Elahi Galán (first round)
8. (Spain) Carlos Taberner (second round)

== Draw ==
=== Key ===
- Q = Qualifier
- WC = Wild card
- LL = Lucky loser
- Alt = Alternate
- SE = Special exempt
- PR = Protected ranking
- ITF = ITF entry
- JE = Junior exempt
- w/o = Walkover
- r = Retired
- d = Defaulted
- SR = Special ranking

=== Finals ===
Semifinals
Q | (Chile) Nicolás Jarry | 4 | 4
4 | (Argentina) Facundo Bagnis | 6 | 6
3 | (Argentina) Federico Coria | 6 | 6
(Argentina) Juan Ignacio Londero | 1 | 4

Final
4 | (Argentina) Facundo Bagnis | 6 | 3 | 6
3 | (Argentina) Federico Coria | 4 | 6 | 2

=== Top half ===
First round
1 | (Brazil) T Monteiro | 7^{7} | 6^{4} | 6^{4}
Q | (Chile) N Jarry | 6^{2} | 7^{7} | 7^{7}
(Argentina) F Cerúndolo | 3 | 6 | 3
WC | (Germany) Peter Heller | 6 | 3 | 6
WC | (Austria) Jakob Aichhorn | 4 | 3
Q | (Czech Republic) J Lehečka | 6 | 6
(France) A Müller | 7 | 7^{7}
7 | (Colombia) DE Galán | 5 | 6^{3}
4 | (Argentina) F Bagnis | 6 | 6
(Brazil) T Seyboth Wild | 3 | 2
(France) H Gaston | 6 | 6
(Germany) M Bachinger | 4 | 3
(Bosnia and Herzegovina) D Džumhur | 6 | 6
(Argentina) F Mena | 4 | 0
Alt | (Italy) M Viola | 4 | 4
8 | (Spain) C Taberner | 6 | 6

Second round
Q | (Chile) N Jarry | 6 | 6
WC | (Germany) P Heller | 2 | 4
Q | (Czech Republic) J Lehečka | 6 | 6
(France) A Müller | 2 | 4
4 | (Argentina) F Bagnis | 6 | 6
(France) H Gaston | 4 | 1
(Bosnia and Herzegovina) D Džumhur | 7^{7} | 6^{5} | 6
8 | (Spain) C Taberner | 6^{2} | 7^{7} | 2

Quarterfinals
Q | (Chile) N Jarry | 7^{8} | 6
Q | (Czech Republic) J Lehečka | 6^{6} | 4
4 | (Argentina) F Bagnis | 6 | 6
(Bosnia and Herzegovina) D Džumhur | 1 | 2

Semifinals
Q | (Chile) N Jarry | 4 | 4
4 | (Argentina) F Bagnis | 6 | 6

=== Bottom half ===
First round
5 | (Spain) R Carballés Baena | 6 | 4 | 6
WC | (Austria) M Neuchrist | 4 | 6 | 4
(Slovenia) B Rola | 7 | 7^{7}
(Austria) D Novak | 5 | 6^{4}
(Switzerland) M-A Hüsler | 6 | 6
(Czech Republic) L Rosol | 3 | 4
PR | (Austria) G Melzer | 3 | 4
3 | (Argentina) F Coria | 6 | 6
6 | (Japan) T Daniel | 4 | 4
(Argentina) JI Londero | 6 | 6
LL | (Russia) A Vatutin | 2 | 6 | 6
Q | (Austria) A Erler | 6 | 4 | 2
(Latvia) E Gulbis | 2 | 6^{4}
(Serbia) D Petrović | 6 | 7^{7}
Q | (Kazakhstan) D Yevseyev | 5 | 3
2 | (Uruguay) P Cuevas | 7 | 6

Second round
5 | (Spain) R Carballés Baena | 7 | 2 | 6^{4}
(Slovenia) B Rola | 5 | 6 | 7^{7}
(Switzerland) M-A Hüsler | 1 | 6 | 4
3 | (Argentina) F Coria | 6 | 4 | 6
(Argentina) JI Londero | 6 | 2 | 6
LL | (Russia) A Vatutin | 0 | 6 | 0
(Serbia) D Petrović | 1 | 4
2 | (Uruguay) P Cuevas | 6 | 6

Quarterfinals
(Slovenia) B Rola | 2 | 6^{5}
3 | (Argentina) F Coria | 6 | 7^{7}
(Argentina) JI Londero | 6 | 6
2 | (Uruguay) P Cuevas | 3 | 0

Semifinals
3 | (Argentina) F Coria | 6 | 6
(Argentina) JI Londero | 1 | 4
