= 2021 ATP Salzburg Open =

- Date: 5–11 July
- Edition: 1st
- Surface: Clay
- Location: Anif, Austria

Champions

Singles
- (Argentina) Facundo Bagnis

Doubles
- (Argentina) Facundo Bagnis / (Peru) Sergio Galdós
Salzburg Open	· 2022 →

The 2021 ATP Salzburg Open was a professional tennis tournament played on outdoor clay courts. It was the first edition of the tournament which was part of the 2021 ATP Challenger Tour. It took place in Anif (Salzburg), Austria between 5 and 11 July 2021.

== Singles main draw entrants ==
=== Seeds ===
Country	Player	Rank^{1}	Seed
BRA	Thiago Monteiro	81	1
URU	Pablo Cuevas	84	2
ARG	Federico Coria	87	3
ARG	Facundo Bagnis	92	4
ESP	Roberto Carballés Baena	100	5
JPN	Taro Daniel	103	6
COL	Daniel Elahi Galán	112	7
ESP	Carlos Taberner	113	8

- ^{1} Rankings are as of 28 June 2021.

=== Other entrants ===
The following players received wildcards into the singles main draw:

- (Austria) Jakob Aichhorn
- (Germany) Peter Heller
- (Austria) Maximilian Neuchrist

The following player received entry into the singles main draw using a protected ranking:

- (Austria) Gerald Melzer

The following player received entry into the singles main draw as an alternate:

- (Italy) Matteo Viola

The following players received entry from the qualifying draw:

- (Austria) Alexander Erler
- (Chile) Nicolás Jarry
- (Czech Republic) Jiří Lehečka
- (Kazakhstan) Denis Yevseyev

The following player received entry as a lucky loser:

- (Russia) Alexey Vatutin

== Champions ==
=== Singles ===
- (Argentina) Facundo Bagnis def. (Argentina) Federico Coria 6–4, 3–6, 6–2.

=== Doubles ===
- (Argentina) Facundo Bagnis / (Peru) Sergio Galdós def. (United States) Robert Galloway / (United States) Alex Lawson 6–0, 6–3.
