= 2021 ATP Salzburg Open – Doubles =

Doubles
- 2021 ATP Salzburg Open

Final
- Champions: (Argentina) Facundo Bagnis (Peru) Sergio Galdós
- Runners-up: (United States) Robert Galloway (United States) Alex Lawson
- Score: 6–0, 6–3

Events
Singles	Doubles
- Salzburg Open

This was the first edition of the tournament.

Facundo Bagnis and Sergio Galdós won the title after defeating Robert Galloway and Alex Lawson 6–0, 6–3 in the final.

== Seeds ==
1. (Argentina) Andrés Molteni / (Italy) Andrea Vavassori (semifinals)
2. (Ukraine) Denys Molchanov / (Kazakhstan) Aleksandr Nedovyesov (first round)
3. (Venezuela) Luis David Martínez / (New Zealand) Artem Sitak (first round)
4. (France) Sadio Doumbia / (France) Fabien Reboul (quarterfinals)

== Draw ==
Key

- Q = Qualifier
- WC = Wild card
- LL = Lucky loser
- Alt = Alternate
- ITF = ITF entry
- PR = Protected ranking
- SR = Special ranking
- SE = Special exempt
- JE = Junior exempt
- JR = Junior Accelerator Programme entrant
- CO = College Accelerator Programme entrant
- NG = Next Gen Accelerator Program entrant
- w/o = Walkover
- r = Retired
- d = Defaulted

First round
1	(Argentina) A Molteni (Italy) A Vavassori	7	6
(France) H Gaston (Spain) C Taberner	5	3
(Argentina) F Cerúndolo (Argentina) F Coria	6	0	[11]
(Germany) D Brown (Austria) T-S Weissborn	3	6	[9]
3	(Venezuela) LD Martínez (New Zealand) A Sitak	4	2
(Argentina) F Bagnis (Peru) S Galdós	6	6
WC	(Austria) Jakob Aichhorn (Austria) Gregor Ramskogler	w/o
(Spain) R Carballés Baena (Colombia) DE Galán
WC	(Austria) A Erler (Austria) M Neuchrist	6	6
(Russia) A Vatutin (Kazakhstan) D Yevseyev	0	3
(Romania) VV Cornea (Peru) A Merino	3	6	[2]
4	(France) S Doumbia (France) F Reboul	6	4	[10]
(Switzerland) M-A Hüsler (Austria) L Miedler	7	6
WC	(Germany) Peter Heller (Belgium) Jeroen Vanneste	5	4
(United States) R Galloway (United States) A Lawson	7^{8}	6
2	(Ukraine) D Molchanov (Kazakhstan) A Nedovyesov	6^{6}	4

Quarterfinals
1	(Argentina) A Molteni (Italy) A Vavassori	6	7
(Argentina) F Cerúndolo (Argentina) F Coria	1	5
(Argentina) F Bagnis (Peru) S Galdós	6	6
WC	(Austria) J Aichhorn (Austria) G Ramskogler	2	3
WC	(Austria) A Erler (Austria) M Neuchrist	6	6
4	(France) S Doumbia (France) F Reboul	4	4
(Switzerland) M-A Hüsler (Austria) L Miedler	5	2
(United States) R Galloway (United States) A Lawson	7	6

Semifinals
1	(Argentina) A Molteni (Italy) A Vavassori	6	6^{1}	[16]
(Argentina) F Bagnis (Peru) S Galdós	3	7^{7}	[18]
WC	(Austria) A Erler (Austria) M Neuchrist	1	2
(United States) R Galloway (United States) A Lawson	6	6

Final
(Argentina) F Bagnis (Peru) S Galdós	6	6
(United States) R Galloway (United States) A Lawson	0	3
