= 2024 Salzburg Open – Doubles =

Doubles
- 2024 Salzburg Open

Final
- Champions: (France) Manuel Guinard (France) Grégoire Jacq
- Runners-up: (Czech Republic) Petr Nouza (Czech Republic) Patrik Rikl
- Score: 2–6, 6–3, [14–12]

Events
Singles	Doubles
- Salzburg Open

Andrey Golubev and Denys Molchanov were the defending champions but chose not to defend their title.

Manuel Guinard and Grégoire Jacq won the title after defeating Petr Nouza and Patrik Rikl 2–6, 6–3, [14–12] in the final.

== Seeds ==
1. (Austria) Alexander Erler / (Austria) Lucas Miedler (first round)
2. (France) Théo Arribagé / (United States) Reese Stalder (quarterfinals)
3. (France) Manuel Guinard / (France) Grégoire Jacq (champions)
4. (Germany) Jakob Schnaitter / (Germany) Mark Wallner (quarterfinals)

== Draw ==
Key

- Q = Qualifier
- WC = Wild card
- LL = Lucky loser
- Alt = Alternate
- ITF = ITF entry
- PR = Protected ranking
- SR = Special ranking
- SE = Special exempt
- JE = Junior exempt
- JR = Junior Accelerator Programme entrant
- CO = College Accelerator Programme entrant
- NG = Next Gen Accelerator Program entrant
- w/o = Walkover
- r = Retired
- d = Defaulted

=== Draw ===
First round
1	(Austria) A Erler (Austria) L Miedler	4	2
WC	(Austria) N Hipfl (Switzerland) J Kym	6	6
(Netherlands) Ryan Nijboer (Argentina) TA Tirante	6	3	[8]
(Austria) D Pichler (Italy) G Ricca	4	6	[10]
3	(France) M Guinard (France) G Jacq	6	6
(Sweden) F Bergevi (Netherlands) M Veldheer	2	2
(Austria) S Kopp (Austria) N Oberleitner	6	6
(Australia) T Fancutt (New Zealand) R Statham	3	3
(Czech Republic) P Nouza (Czech Republic) P Rikl	6	6
(Spain) D Jordà Sanchis (Spain) A Moro Cañas	4	2
(Brazil) M Alves (India) D Sharan	6^{2}	6	[5]
4	(Germany) J Schnaitter (Germany) M Wallner	7^{7}	3	[10]
(Argentina) M Kestelboim (Uruguay) F Roncadelli	4	6^{7}
WC	(Austria) P Oswald (Austria) J Schwärzler	6	7^{9}
(Argentina) S Rodríguez Taverna (Germany) P Zahraj	5	3
2	(France) T Arribagé (United States) R Stalder	7	6

Quarterfinals
WC	(Austria) N Hipfl (Switzerland) J Kym	6	6
(Austria) D Pichler (Italy) G Ricca	4	4
3	(France) M Guinard (France) G Jacq	6	7
(Austria) S Kopp (Austria) N Oberleitner	3	5
(Czech Republic) P Nouza (Czech Republic) P Rikl	6	6^{6}	[10]
4	(Germany) J Schnaitter (Germany) M Wallner	4	7^{8}	[4]
WC	(Austria) P Oswald (Austria) J Schwärzler	7^{8}	6
2	(France) T Arribagé (United States) R Stalder	6^{6}	2

Semifinals
WC	(Austria) N Hipfl (Switzerland) J Kym
3	(France) M Guinard (France) G Jacq	w/o
(Czech Republic) P Nouza (Czech Republic) P Rikl	6	6
WC	(Austria) P Oswald (Austria) J Schwärzler	3	4

Final
3	(France) M Guinard (France) G Jacq	2	6	[14]
(Czech Republic) P Nouza (Czech Republic) P Rikl	6	3	[12]
