= 2023 Salzburg Open – Singles =

Singles
- 2023 Salzburg Open

Final
- Champion: (Austria) Sebastian Ofner
- Runner-up: (Austria) Lukas Neumayer
- Score: 6–3, 6–2

Events
Singles	Doubles
- Salzburg Open

Thiago Monteiro was the defending champion but lost in the quarterfinals to Lukas Neumayer.

Sebastian Ofner won the title after defeating Neumayer 6–3, 6–2 in the final.

== Seeds ==
1. (Spain) Roberto Carballés Baena (first round)
2. (Peru) Juan Pablo Varillas (second round)
3. (Austria) Sebastian Ofner (champion)
4. (Brazil) Thiago Monteiro (quarterfinals)
5. (Argentina) Juan Manuel Cerúndolo (semifinals)
6. (Austria) Jurij Rodionov (second round)
7. (Argentina) Facundo Bagnis (second round)
8. (Austria) Filip Misolic (quarterfinals)

== Draw ==
Key

- Q = Qualifier
- WC = Wild card
- LL = Lucky loser
- Alt = Alternate
- ITF = ITF entry
- PR = Protected ranking
- SR = Special ranking
- SE = Special exempt
- JE = Junior exempt
- JR = Junior Accelerator Programme entrant
- CO = College Accelerator Programme entrant
- NG = Next Gen Accelerator Program entrant
- w/o = Walkover
- r = Retired
- d = Defaulted

=== Finals ===
Semifinals
Q	(Slovenia) Blaž Rola	4	6	5
WC	(Austria) Lukas Neumayer	6	3	7
3	(Austria) Sebastian Ofner	6	6
5	(Argentina) Juan Manuel Cerúndolo	0	2

Final
WC	(Austria) Lukas Neumayer	3	2
3	(Austria) Sebastian Ofner	6	6

=== Top half ===
First round
1	(Spain) R Carballés Baena	6^{4}	1
Q	(Slovenia) B Rola	7^{7}	6
WC	(Austria) N Oberleitner	7^{8}	1	1
Alt	(Czech Republic) V Kopřiva	6^{6}	6	6
(Slovakia) N Gombos	7^{7}	3	5
SE	(France) M Guinard	6^{5}	6	7
Q	(Austria) S Kopp	5	2
8	(Austria) F Misolic	7	6
4	(Brazil) T Monteiro	6	3	7^{7}
(Ukraine) O Krutykh	3	6	6^{3}
(Switzerland) A Ritschard	6	3	5
(Argentina) M Trungelliti	1	6	7
(India) S Nagal	4	6^{3}
WC	(Austria) L Neumayer	6	7^{7}
(Austria) M Neuchrist	4	7^{7}	5
7	(Argentina) F Bagnis	6	6^{4}	7

Second round
Q	(Slovenia) B Rola	6	1	6
Alt	(Czech Republic) V Kopřiva	3	6	3
SE	(France) M Guinard	5	6^{5}
8	(Austria) F Misolic	7	7^{7}
4	(Brazil) T Monteiro	4	6	6
(Argentina) M Trungelliti	6	4	3
WC	(Austria) L Neumayer	7^{7}	7
7	(Argentina) F Bagnis	6^{3}	5

Quarterfinals
Q	(Slovenia) B Rola	6	6
8	(Austria) F Misolic	3	3
4	(Brazil) T Monteiro	4	4
WC	(Austria) L Neumayer	6	6

Semifinals
Q	(Slovenia) B Rola	4	6	5
WC	(Austria) L Neumayer	6	3	7

=== Bottom half ===
First round
6	(Austria) J Rodionov	6	2	7^{7}
Q	(Norway) V Durasovic	4	6	6^{4}
(Brazil) M Pucinelli de Almeida	0	5
Alt	(Bosnia and Herzegovina) N Fatić	6	7
(Austria) D Novak	5	7	3
(Slovakia) L Klein	7	5	6
(Argentina) A Collarini	4	2
3	(Austria) S Ofner	6	6
5	(Argentina) JM Cerúndolo	6	6
Q	(France) M Chazal	3	4
Q	(Argentina) A Barrena	6	6
Q	(Australia) A Santillan	3	0
(Bosnia and Herzegovina) D Džumhur	5	3
(Sweden) E Ymer	7	6
WC	(Argentina) F Delbonis	4	1
2	(Peru) JP Varillas	6	6

Second round
6	(Austria) J Rodionov	5	4
Alt	(Bosnia and Herzegovina) N Fatić	7	6
(Slovakia) L Klein	4	5
3	(Austria) S Ofner	6	7
5	(Argentina) JM Cerúndolo	6	4	6
Q	(Argentina) A Barrena	2	6	1
(Sweden) E Ymer	7^{7}	6
2	(Peru) JP Varillas	6^{3}	2

Quarterfinals
Alt	(Bosnia and Herzegovina) N Fatić	6	6^{4}	5
3	(Austria) S Ofner	4	7^{7}	7
5	(Argentina) JM Cerúndolo	1	6	6
(Sweden) E Ymer	6	2	3

Semifinals
3	(Austria) S Ofner	6	6
5	(Argentina) JM Cerúndolo	0	2
