= 2024 Salzburg Open – Singles =

Singles
- 2024 Salzburg Open

Final
- Champion: (Switzerland) Alexander Ritschard
- Runner-up: (France) Kyrian Jacquet
- Score: 6–4, 6–2

Events
Singles	Doubles
- Salzburg Open

Sebastian Ofner was the defending champion but chose not to defend his title.

Alexander Ritschard won the title after defeating Kyrian Jacquet 6–4, 6–2 in the final.

== Seeds ==
1. (Argentina) Federico Coria (quarterfinals)
2. (Japan) Taro Daniel (first round)
3. (Brazil) Thiago Monteiro (semifinals)
4. (Czech Republic) Vít Kopřiva (second round)
5. (Serbia) Hamad Medjedovic (quarterfinals)
6. (Argentina) Thiago Agustín Tirante (second round)
7. (United Kingdom) Jan Choinski (second round)
8. (Switzerland) Alexander Ritschard (champion)

== Draw ==
Key

- Q = Qualifier
- WC = Wild card
- LL = Lucky loser
- Alt = Alternate
- ITF = ITF entry
- PR = Protected ranking
- SR = Special ranking
- SE = Special exempt
- JE = Junior exempt
- JR = Junior Accelerator Programme entrant
- CO = College Accelerator Programme entrant
- NG = Next Gen Accelerator Program entrant
- w/o = Walkover
- r = Retired
- d = Defaulted

=== Finals ===
Semifinals
8	(Switzerland) Alexander Ritschard	5	6	7^{7}
(Peru) Ignacio Buse	7	2	6^{2}
3	(Brazil) Thiago Monteiro	3	4
(France) Kyrian Jacquet	6	6

Final
8	(Switzerland) Alexander Ritschard	6	6
(France) Kyrian Jacquet	4	2

=== Top half ===
First round
1	(Argentina) F Coria	6	6
Q	(Spain) D Jordà Sanchis	3	4
(Poland) M Kaśnikowski	6	6
(Austria) F Misolic	4	2
Q	(Switzerland) J Nikles	4	7	1
Alt	(Switzerland) J Kym	6	5	6
(Spain) B Zapata Miralles	2	4
8	(Switzerland) A Ritschard	6	6
4	(Czech Republic) V Kopřiva	6	7^{7}
Q	(United States) T Kodat	4	6^{3}
(South Korea) G Campaña Lee	4	2
(Peru) I Buse	6	6
WC	(Austria) J Schwärzler	2	3
(Switzerland) M-A Hüsler	6	6
Alt	(Czech Republic) Z Kolář	1	1^{r}
5	(Serbia) H Medjedovic	6	4

Second round
1	(Argentina) F Coria	6^{4}	6	6
(Poland) M Kaśnikowski	7^{7}	2	1
Alt	(Switzerland) J Kym	0	4
8	(Switzerland) A Ritschard	6	6
4	(Czech Republic) V Kopřiva	6	2	4
(Peru) I Buse	4	6	6
(Switzerland) M-A Hüsler	3	6^{4}
5	(Serbia) H Medjedovic	6	7^{7}

Quarterfinals
1	(Argentina) F Coria	4	6	1
8	(Switzerland) A Ritschard	6	4	6
(Peru) I Buse	6^{5}	6	6
5	(Serbia) H Medjedovic	7^{7}	3	4

Semifinals
8	(Switzerland) A Ritschard	5	6	7^{7}
(Peru) I Buse	7	2	6^{2}

=== Bottom half ===
First round
7	(United Kingdom) J Choinski	7	6
WC	(Austria) N Oberleitner	5	3
(France) C Tabur	7^{7}	4	4
(Spain) A Moro Cañas	6^{5}	6	6
Q	(Austria) D Pichler	6^{3}	1
(Kazakhstan) T Skatov	7^{7}	6
Q	(Slovenia) B Rola	6^{2}	3
3	(Brazil) T Monteiro	7^{7}	6
6	(Argentina) TA Tirante	7^{7}	6
(Argentina) S Rodríguez Taverna	6^{2}	1
(Austria) L Neumayer	6	6
(France) M Guinard	3	2
Q	(Germany) Adrian Oetzbach	7^{7}	1	1
WC	(Austria) S Kopp	6^{2}	6	6
(France) K Jacquet	6	7^{7}
2	(Japan) T Daniel	1	6^{3}

Second round
7	(United Kingdom) J Choinski	5	4
(Spain) A Moro Cañas	7	6
(Kazakhstan) T Skatov	6	3	3
3	(Brazil) T Monteiro	3	6	6
6	(Argentina) TA Tirante	4	3
(Austria) L Neumayer	6	6
WC	(Austria) S Kopp	1	7	0
(France) K Jacquet	6	5	6

Quarterfinals
(Spain) A Moro Cañas	2	1
3	(Brazil) T Monteiro	6	6
(Austria) L Neumayer	6	4	3
(France) K Jacquet	2	6	6

Semifinals
3	(Brazil) T Monteiro	3	4
(France) K Jacquet	6	6
