= 2022 Salzburg Open =

- Date: 4–10 July
- Edition: 2nd
- Surface: Clay
- Location: Anif, Austria

Champions

Singles
- (Brazil) Thiago Monteiro

Doubles
- (United States) Nathaniel Lammons / (United States) Jackson Withrow
- Salzburg Open

The 2022 Salzburg Open was a professional tennis tournament played on outdoor clay courts. It was the second edition of the tournament which was part of the 2022 ATP Challenger Tour. It took place in Anif (Salzburg), Austria between 4 and 10 July 2022.

== Singles main draw entrants ==
=== Seeds ===
Country	Player	Rank^{1}	Seed
FRA	Arthur Rinderknech	62	1
SRB	Dušan Lajović	64	2
CZE	Jiří Lehečka	72	3
ESP	Roberto Carballés Baena	87	4
SWE	Mikael Ymer	88	5
BRA	Thiago Monteiro	89	6
ARG	Facundo Bagnis	102	7
ESP	Fernando Verdasco	115	8

- ^{1} Rankings are as of 27 June 2022.

=== Other entrants ===
The following players received wildcards into the singles main draw:

- (Austria) Lukas Neumayer
- (Austria) Dominic Thiem
- (Spain) Fernando Verdasco

The following player received entry into the singles main draw using a protected ranking:

- (Austria) Sebastian Ofner

The following player received entry into the singles main draw as a special exempt:

- (Serbia) Hamad Međedović

The following player received entry into the singles main draw as an alternate:

- (Italy) Andrea Arnaboldi

The following players received entry from the qualifying draw:

- (Argentina) Facundo Díaz Acosta
- Ivan Gakhov
- (Austria) Lucas Miedler
- (Austria) Filip Misolic
- (Austria) Maximilian Neuchrist
- (Ukraine) Vitaliy Sachko

The following player received entry as a lucky loser:

- (Spain) Pol Martín Tiffon

== Champions ==
=== Singles ===
- (Brazil) Thiago Monteiro def. (Slovakia) Norbert Gombos 6–3, 7–6^{(7–2)}.

=== Doubles ===
- (United States) Nathaniel Lammons / (United States) Jackson Withrow def. (Austria) Alexander Erler / (Austria) Lucas Miedler 7–5, 5–7, [11–9].
