= 2024 Salzburg Open =

- Date: 8–14 July
- Edition: 4th
- Surface: Clay
- Location: Salzburg, Austria

Champions

Singles
- (Switzerland) Alexander Ritschard

Doubles
- (France) Manuel Guinard / (France) Grégoire Jacq
- Salzburg Open

The 2024 Salzburg Open, known as the Sparkasse Salzburg Open, was a professional tennis tournament played on outdoor clay courts. It was the fourth edition of the tournament which was part of the 2024 ATP Challenger Tour. It took place in Salzburg, Austria between 8 and 14 July 2024.

== Singles main draw entrants ==
=== Seeds ===
| Country | Player | Rank^{1} | Seed |
|---|---|---|---|
| ARG | Federico Coria | 72 | 1 |
| JPN | Taro Daniel | 84 | 2 |
| BRA | Thiago Monteiro | 86 | 3 |
| CZE | Vít Kopřiva | 123 | 4 |
| SRB | Hamad Medjedovic | 126 | 5 |
| ARG | Thiago Agustín Tirante | 127 | 6 |
| GBR | Jan Choinski | 174 | 7 |
| SUI | Alexander Ritschard | 175 | 8 |

- ^{1} Rankings are as of 1 July 2024.

=== Other entrants ===
The following players received wildcards into the singles main draw:

- (Austria) Sandro Kopp
- (Austria) Neil Oberleitner
- (Austria) Joel Schwärzler

The following players received entry into the singles main draw as alternates:

- (Czech Republic) Zdeněk Kolář
- (Switzerland) Jérôme Kym

The following players received entry from the qualifying draw:

- (Spain) David Jordà Sanchis
- (United States) Toby Kodat
- (Switzerland) Johan Nikles
- (Germany) Adrian Oetzbach
- (Austria) David Pichler
- (Slovenia) Blaž Rola

== Champions ==
=== Singles ===
- (Switzerland) Alexander Ritschard def. (France) Kyrian Jacquet 6–4, 6–2.

=== Doubles ===
- (France) Manuel Guinard / (France) Grégoire Jacq def. (Czech Republic) Petr Nouza / (Czech Republic) Patrik Rikl 2–6, 6–3, [14–12].
