= 2023 Salzburg Open =

- Date: 10–16 July
- Edition: 3rd
- Surface: Clay
- Location: Salzburg, Austria

Champions

Singles
- (Austria) Sebastian Ofner

Doubles
- (Kazakhstan) Andrey Golubev / (Ukraine) Denys Molchanov
- Salzburg Open

The 2023 Salzburg Open was a professional tennis tournament played on outdoor clay courts. It was the third edition of the tournament which was part of the 2023 ATP Challenger Tour. It took place in Salzburg, Austria between 10 and 16 July 2023.

== Singles main draw entrants ==
=== Seeds ===
Country	Player	Rank^{1}	Seed
ESP	Roberto Carballés Baena	57	1
PER	Juan Pablo Varillas	63	2
AUT	Sebastian Ofner	72	3
BRA	Thiago Monteiro	95	4
ARG	Juan Manuel Cerúndolo	111	5
AUT	Jurij Rodionov	118	6
ARG	Facundo Bagnis	126	7
AUT	Filip Misolic	141	8

- ^{1} Rankings are as of 3 July 2023.

=== Other entrants ===
The following players received wildcards into the singles main draw:

- (Argentina) Federico Delbonis
- (Austria) Lukas Neumayer
- (Austria) Neil Oberleitner

The following player received entry into the singles main draw as a special exempt:

- (France) Manuel Guinard

The following players received entry into the singles main draw as alternates:

- (Bosnia and Herzegovina) Nerman Fatić
- (Czech Republic) Vít Kopřiva

The following players received entry from the qualifying draw:

- (Argentina) Alex Barrena
- (France) Maxime Chazal
- (Norway) Viktor Durasovic
- (Austria) Sandro Kopp
- (Slovenia) Blaž Rola
- (Australia) Akira Santillan

== Champions ==
=== Singles ===
- (Austria) Sebastian Ofner def. (Austria) Lukas Neumayer 6–3, 6–2.

=== Doubles ===
- (Kazakhstan) Andrey Golubev / (Ukraine) Denys Molchanov def. (India) Anirudh Chandrasekar / (India) Vijay Sundar Prashanth 6–4, 7–6^{(10–8)}.
