= 2022 Salzburg Open – Doubles =

Doubles
- 2022 Salzburg Open

Final
- Champions: (United States) Nathaniel Lammons (United States) Jackson Withrow
- Runners-up: (Austria) Alexander Erler (Austria) Lucas Miedler
- Score: 7–5, 5–7, [11–9]

Events
Singles	Doubles
- Salzburg Open

Facundo Bagnis and Sergio Galdós were the defending champions but chose not to defend their title.

Nathaniel Lammons and Jackson Withrow won the title after defeating Alexander Erler and Lucas Miedler 7–5, 5–7, [11–9] in the final.

== Seeds ==
1. (France) Sadio Doumbia / (France) Fabien Reboul (quarterfinals)
2. (Austria) Alexander Erler / (Austria) Lucas Miedler (final)
3. (United States) Nathaniel Lammons / (United States) Jackson Withrow (champions)
4. (Ecuador) Diego Hidalgo / (Colombia) Cristian Rodríguez (first round)

== Draw ==
Key

- Q = Qualifier
- WC = Wild card
- LL = Lucky loser
- Alt = Alternate
- ITF = ITF entry
- PR = Protected ranking
- SR = Special ranking
- SE = Special exempt
- JE = Junior exempt
- JR = Junior Accelerator Programme entrant
- CO = College Accelerator Programme entrant
- NG = Next Gen Accelerator Program entrant
- w/o = Walkover
- r = Retired
- d = Defaulted

First round
1	(France) S Doumbia (France) F Reboul	6	7
(Romania) VV Cornea (Czech Republic) Z Kolář	4	5
(Austria) M Neuchrist (Austria) T-S Weissborn	7^{7}	6
(Poland) P Matuszewski (Ukraine) V Sachko	6^{2}	4
3	(United States) N Lammons (United States) J Withrow	6	7
(Israel) J Erlich (Austria) P Oswald	2	5
(Bosnia and Herzegovina) A Šetkić; A Shevchenko	6	6
(Germany) Kai Lemstra (Austria) J Rodionov	3	4
WC	(Austria) L Neumayer (Austria) N Oberleitner	6	7^{10}
Alt	B Bobrov; I Gakhov	4	6^{8}
(Uruguay) M Cuevas (Venezuela) LD Martínez	6	6
4	(Ecuador) D Hidalgo (Colombia) C Rodríguez	4	4
(Czech Republic) J Lehečka (Czech Republic) D Svrčina	6	6
WC	(Austria) Benedikt Emesz (Austria) S Kopp	1	2
(Romania) M Copil (Turkey) E Kırkın	5	3
2	(Austria) A Erler (Austria) L Miedler	7	6

Quarterfinals
1	(France) S Doumbia (France) F Reboul	4	4
(Austria) M Neuchrist (Austria) T-S Weissborn	6	6
3	(United States) N Lammons (United States) J Withrow	w/o
(Bosnia and Herzegovina) A Šetkić; A Shevchenko
WC	(Austria) L Neumayer (Austria) N Oberleitner	2	5
(Uruguay) M Cuevas (Venezuela) LD Martínez	6	7
(Czech Republic) J Lehečka (Czech Republic) D Svrčina	2	0
2	(Austria) A Erler (Austria) L Miedler	6	6

Semifinals
(Austria) M Neuchrist (Austria) T-S Weissborn	3	4
3	(United States) N Lammons (United States) J Withrow	6	6
(Uruguay) M Cuevas (Venezuela) LD Martínez	3	6^{3}
2	(Austria) A Erler (Austria) L Miedler	6	7^{7}

Final
3	(United States) N Lammons (United States) J Withrow	7	5	[11]
2	(Austria) A Erler (Austria) L Miedler	5	7	[9]
