= 2010 International German Open – Singles =

Singles
- 2010 International German Open

Final
- Champion: (Kazakhstan) Andrey Golubev
- Runner-up: (Austria) Jürgen Melzer
- Score: 6–3, 7–5

Details
- Draw: 48 (6Q / 4WC)
- Seeds: 16

Events
Singles	Doubles
- International German Open

Nikolay Davydenko was the defender of championship title; however, he lost to Andrey Golubev in the third round.
Unseeded Golubev, the biggest surprise of this tournament, won in the final 6–3, 7–5, against Jürgen Melzer.

== Seeds ==
All seeds receive a bye into the second round.

1. (Russia) Nikolay Davydenko (third round)
2. (Spain) David Ferrer (withdrew)
3. (Austria) Jürgen Melzer (final)
4. (France) Gaël Monfils (withdrew due to a right ankle injury)
5. (Spain) Nicolás Almagro (second round)
6. (Spain) Juan Carlos Ferrero (quarterfinals)
7. (Brazil) Thomaz Bellucci (quarterfinals)
8. (Spain) Albert Montañés (second round)
9. (France) Gilles Simon (second round)
10. (Germany) Philipp Kohlschreiber (third round)
11. (Spain) Tommy Robredo (second round)
12. (Romania) Victor Hănescu (second round)
13. (Germany) Philipp Petzschner (second round)
14. (Spain) Guillermo García López (withdrew)
15. (Ukraine) Alexandr Dolgopolov (second round)
16. (Germany) Michael Berrer (second round)

== Draw ==
Key

- Q = Qualifier
- WC = Wild card
- LL = Lucky loser
- Alt = Alternate
- ITF = ITF entry
- PR = Protected ranking
- SR = Special ranking
- SE = Special exempt
- JE = Junior exempt
- JR = Junior Accelerator Programme entrant
- CO = College Accelerator Programme entrant
- NG = Next Gen Accelerator Program entrant
- w/o = Walkover
- r = Retired
- d = Defaulted

=== Finals ===
Quarterfinals
(Kazakhstan) Andrey Golubev	6	6
(Uzbekistan) Denis Istomin	4	1
(Germany) Florian Mayer	6^{3}	6	6
6	(Spain) Juan Carlos Ferrero	7	2	3
(Italy) Potito Starace	4	1
3	(Austria) Jürgen Melzer	6	6
7	(Brazil) Thomaz Bellucci	6^{0}	7	5
(Italy) Andreas Seppi	7	5	7

Semifinals
(Kazakhstan) Andrey Golubev	7	6
(Germany) Florian Mayer	6^{6}	4
3	(Austria) Jürgen Melzer	6	6
(Italy) Andreas Seppi	4	2

Final
(Kazakhstan) Andrey Golubev	6	7
3	(Austria) Jürgen Melzer	3	5

=== Top half ===
==== Section 1 ====
First round
(France) F Serra	7^{9}	6
(Kazakhstan) E Korolev	6^{7}	3
WC	(Germany) M Zverev	5	1
(Kazakhstan) A Golubev	7	6
WC	(Germany) D Brands	2	6^{10}
WC	(Germany) J Reister	6	7^{12}
(Uzbekistan) D Istomin	3	6	6
Q	(Czech Republic) L Rosol	6	4	3

Second round
1	(Russia) N Davydenko	6	6
(France) F Serra	3	1
(Kazakhstan) A Golubev	6	7
LL	(Spain) M Granollers	4	5
12	(Romania) V Hănescu	6^{4}	4
WC	(Germany) J Reister	7^{7}	6
(Uzbekistan) D Istomin	7^{7}	7^{9}
5	(Spain) N Almagro	6^{5}	6^{7}

Third round
1	(Russia) N Davydenko	4	4
(Kazakhstan) A Golubev	6	6
WC	(Germany) J Reister	6	3	6^{3}
(Uzbekistan) D Istomin	3	6	7^{7}

Quarterfinals
(Kazakhstan) A Golubev	6	6
(Uzbekistan) D Istomin	4	1

==== Section 2 ====
First round
(Belgium) O Rochus	4	7	2
(Argentina) M González	6	5	6
(Uruguay) P Cuevas	4	1
(Germany) F Mayer	6	6
(Finland) J Nieminen	6	7
Q	(Belgium) C Rochus	3	6^{6}
(Czech Republic) J Hájek	6	4	7
(Germany) A Beck	3	6	5

Second round
LL	(Spain) A Ramos Viñolas	6^{5}	7	2
(Argentina) M González	7	6^{3}	6
(Germany) F Mayer	4	7	6
15	(Ukraine) A Dolgopolov	6	6^{2}	3
9	(France) G Simon	4	6	5
(Finland) J Nieminen	6	3	7
(Czech Republic) J Hájek	6^{4}	1
6	(Spain) JC Ferrero	7	6

Third round
(Argentina) M González	6^{1}	0
(Germany) F Mayer	7	6
(Finland) J Nieminen	2	6	4
6	(Spain) JC Ferrero	6	3	6

Quarterfinals
(Germany) F Mayer	6^{3}	6	6
6	(Spain) JC Ferrero	7	2	3

=== Bottom half ===
==== Section 3 ====
First round
Q	(Spain) P Riba	1	6	6
(France) P-H Mathieu	6	0	3
(Italy) P Starace	7	6
Q	(Germany) B Phau	5	0
(France) J Chardy	6	6
(Switzerland) M Chiudinelli	4	1
(Argentina) E Schwank	6	6
WC	(Germany) T Kamke	3	4

Second round
8	(Spain) A Montañés	4	7	6^{4}
Q	(Spain) P Riba	6	5	7
(Italy) P Starace	7	5	6
11	(Spain) T Robredo	6^{10}	7	1
13	(Germany) P Petzschner	3	3
(France) J Chardy	6	6
(Argentina) E Schwank	4	1
3	(Austria) J Melzer	6	6

Third round
Q	(Spain) P Riba	6	4	4
(Italy) P Starace	4	6	6
(France) J Chardy	5	6^{4}
3	(Austria) J Melzer	7	7

Quarterfinals
(Italy) P Starace	4	1
3	(Austria) J Melzer	6	6

==== Section 4 ====
First round
Q	(Italy) S Bolelli	7	7
(Germany) S Greul	6^{4}	6^{4}
(Argentina) JI Chela	6	6
(Ukraine) S Stakhovsky	2	3
(France) S Robert	4	3
(Italy) A Seppi	6	6
Q	(Spain) R Ramírez Hidalgo	6^{4}	4
(Italy) F Fognini	7	6

Second round
7	(Brazil) T Bellucci	6	3	6
Q	(Italy) S Bolelli	1	6	3
(Argentina) JI Chela	6	2	4
10	(Germany) P Kohlschreiber	2	6	6
16	(Germany) M Berrer	2	6^{4}
(Italy) A Seppi	6	7
(Italy) F Fognini	6	6
LL	(France) M Gicquel	4	4

Third round
7	(Brazil) T Bellucci	7	6
10	(Germany) P Kohlschreiber	5	4
(Italy) A Seppi	6	6
(Italy) F Fognini	4	4

Quarterfinals
7	(Brazil) T Bellucci	6^{0}	7	5
(Italy) A Seppi	7	5	7

== Qualifying ==
=== Seeds ===
1. (Spain) Pere Riba (qualified)
2. (Spain) Marcel Granollers (qualifying competition, lucky loser)
3. (Spain) Rubén Ramírez Hidalgo (qualified)
4. (Germany) Björn Phau (qualified)
5. (Italy) Simone Bolelli (qualified)
6. (Kazakhstan) Yuri Schukin (first round)
7. (Spain) Albert Ramos Viñolas (qualifying competition, lucky loser)
8. (France) Marc Gicquel (qualifying competition, lucky loser)
9. (Spain) Iván Navarro (qualifying competition)
10. (Belgium) Christophe Rochus (qualified)
11. (France) Guillaume Rufin (qualifying competition, retired due to a hamstring injury)
12. (Romania) Victor Crivoi (qualifying competition)

=== Qualifiers ===
1. (Spain) Pere Riba
2. (Belgium) Christophe Rochus
3. (Spain) Rubén Ramírez Hidalgo
4. (Germany) Björn Phau
5. (Italy) Simone Bolelli
6. (Czech Republic) Lukáš Rosol

=== Lucky losers ===
1. (Spain) Marcel Granollers
2. (Spain) Albert Ramos Viñolas
3. (France) Marc Gicquel

=== Draw ===
==== First qualifier ====
First round
1	(Spain) Pere Riba	6	6
(Japan) Hiroki Moriya	1	2
WC	(Germany) Dominik Schulz	3	1
9	(Spain) Iván Navarro	6	6

Qualifying competition
1	(Spain) Pere Riba	6	6
9	(Spain) Iván Navarro	4	3

==== Second qualifier ====
First round
2	(Spain) Marcel Granollers	6	7^{7}
(Australia) James Lemke	1	6^{4}
WC	(Germany) Kevin Krawietz	3	2
10	(Belgium) Christophe Rochus	6	6

Qualifying competition
2	(Spain) Marcel Granollers	4	3
10	(Belgium) Christophe Rochus	6	6

==== Third qualifier ====
First round
3	(Spain) Rubén Ramírez Hidalgo	6	6
(France) Mathieu Rodrigues	3	2
(Czech Republic) Robin Vik	5	4
7	(Spain) Albert Ramos Viñolas	7	6

Qualifying competition
3	(Spain) Rubén Ramírez Hidalgo	6	6
7	(Spain) Albert Ramos Viñolas	2	4

==== Fourth qualifier ====
First round
4	(Germany) Björn Phau	6	6
(Spain) Fernando Vicente	4	2
WC	(Germany) Sascha Klör	6^{2}	6^{4}
8	(France) Marc Gicquel	7^{7}	7^{7}

Qualifying competition
4	(Germany) Björn Phau	6	6
8	(France) Marc Gicquel	3	4

==== Fifth qualifier ====
First round
5	(Italy) Simone Bolelli	6	6
(Germany) Marius Zay	2	4
WC	(Finland) Jaan-Frederik Brunken	1	6^{3}
12	(Romania) Victor Crivoi	6	7^{7}

Qualifying competition
5	(Italy) Simone Bolelli	4	6	6
12	(Romania) Victor Crivoi	6	4	2

==== Sixth qualifier ====
First round
6	(Kazakhstan) Yuri Schukin	2	3
(Czech Republic) Lukáš Rosol	6	6
(Germany) Jan-Lennard Struff	5	6^{3}
11	(France) Guillaume Rufin	7	7^{7}

Qualifying competition
(Czech Republic) Lukáš Rosol	6	3
11	(France) Guillaume Rufin	3	0^{r}
