= 2010 International German Open – Doubles =

Doubles
- 2010 International German Open

Final
- Champion: (Spain) Marc López (Spain) David Marrero
- Runner-up: (France) Jérémy Chardy (France) Paul-Henri Mathieu
- Score: 6–3, 2–6, [10–8]

Details
- Draw: 16
- Seeds: 4

Events
Singles	Doubles
- International German Open

Simon Aspelin and Paul Hanley were the defending champions, but they were eliminated in the quarterfinal by Jérémy Chardy and Paul-Henri Mathieu.
Marc López and David Marrero defeated Jérémy Chardy and Paul-Henri Mathieu 6–3, 2–6, [10–8] in the final.

== Seeds ==
1. (Poland) Mariusz Fyrstenberg / (Poland) Marcin Matkowski (first round)
2. (Austria) Jürgen Melzer / (Germany) Philipp Petzschner (first round)
3. (Slovakia) František Čermák / (Czech Republic) Michal Mertiňák (quarterfinals)
4. (South Africa) Wesley Moodie / (Belgium) Dick Norman (quarterfinals)

== Draw ==
Key

- Q = Qualifier
- WC = Wild card
- LL = Lucky loser
- Alt = Alternate
- ITF = ITF entry
- PR = Protected ranking
- SR = Special ranking
- SE = Special exempt
- JE = Junior exempt
- JR = Junior Accelerator Programme entrant
- CO = College Accelerator Programme entrant
- NG = Next Gen Accelerator Program entrant
- w/o = Walkover
- r = Retired
- d = Defaulted

=== Draw ===
First round
1	(Poland) M Fyrstenberg (Poland) M Matkowski	3	7	[5]
(Slovakia) F Polášek (Ukraine) S Stakhovsky	6	6^{8}	[10]
(Spain) M Granollers (Spain) T Robredo	4	3
(Brazil) M Melo (Brazil) B Soares	6	6
4	(South Africa) W Moodie (Belgium) D Norman	7	6
WC	(Germany) T Kamke (Germany) J Reister	6^{2}	4
(Brazil) T Bellucci (Argentina) M González	6^{6}	2
(Spain) M López (Spain) D Marrero	7	6
ALT	(Italy) A Seppi (Italy) P Starace	6	6^{5}	[9]
WC	(Germany) A Beck (Germany) C Kas	4	7	[11]
(Uruguay) P Cuevas (Argentina) E Schwank	3	6	[20]
3	(Czech Republic) F Čermák (Slovakia) M Mertiňák	6	3	[22]
(Sweden) J Brunström (Germany) P Kohlschreiber	6	6^{5}	[8]
ALT	(France) J Chardy (France) P-H Mathieu	4	7	[10]
(Sweden) S Aspelin (Australia) P Hanley	5	6	[10]
2	(Austria) J Melzer (Germany) P Petzschner	7	4	[6]

Quarterfinals
(Slovakia) F Polášek (Ukraine) S Stakhovsky	6^{5}	4
(Brazil) M Melo (Brazil) B Soares	7	6
4	(South Africa) W Moodie (Belgium) D Norman	7	4	[7]
(Spain) M López (Spain) D Marrero	6^{4}	6	[10]
WC	(Germany) A Beck (Germany) C Kas	6	7
3	(Czech Republic) F Čermák (Slovakia) M Mertiňák	2	6^{7}
ALT	(France) J Chardy (France) P-H Mathieu	6	1
(Sweden) S Aspelin (Australia) P Hanley	3	0	r

Semifinals
(Brazil) M Melo (Brazil) B Soares	4	6	[12]
(Spain) M López (Spain) D Marrero	6	3	[14]
WC	(Germany) A Beck (Germany) C Kas	6	4	[8]
ALT	(France) J Chardy (France) P-H Mathieu	4	6	[10]

Finals
(Spain) M López (Spain) D Marrero	6	2	[10]
ALT	(France) J Chardy (France) P-H Mathieu	3	6	[8]
