= 2010 International German Open =

- Date: 19–25 July
- Edition: 104th
- Category: ATP World Tour 500
- Draw: 48S / 16D
- Prize money: €1,000,000
- Surface: Clay / outdoor
- Location: Hamburg, Germany

Champions

Singles
- (Kazakhstan) Andrey Golubev

Doubles
- (Spain) Marc López / (Spain) David Marrero
- International German Open

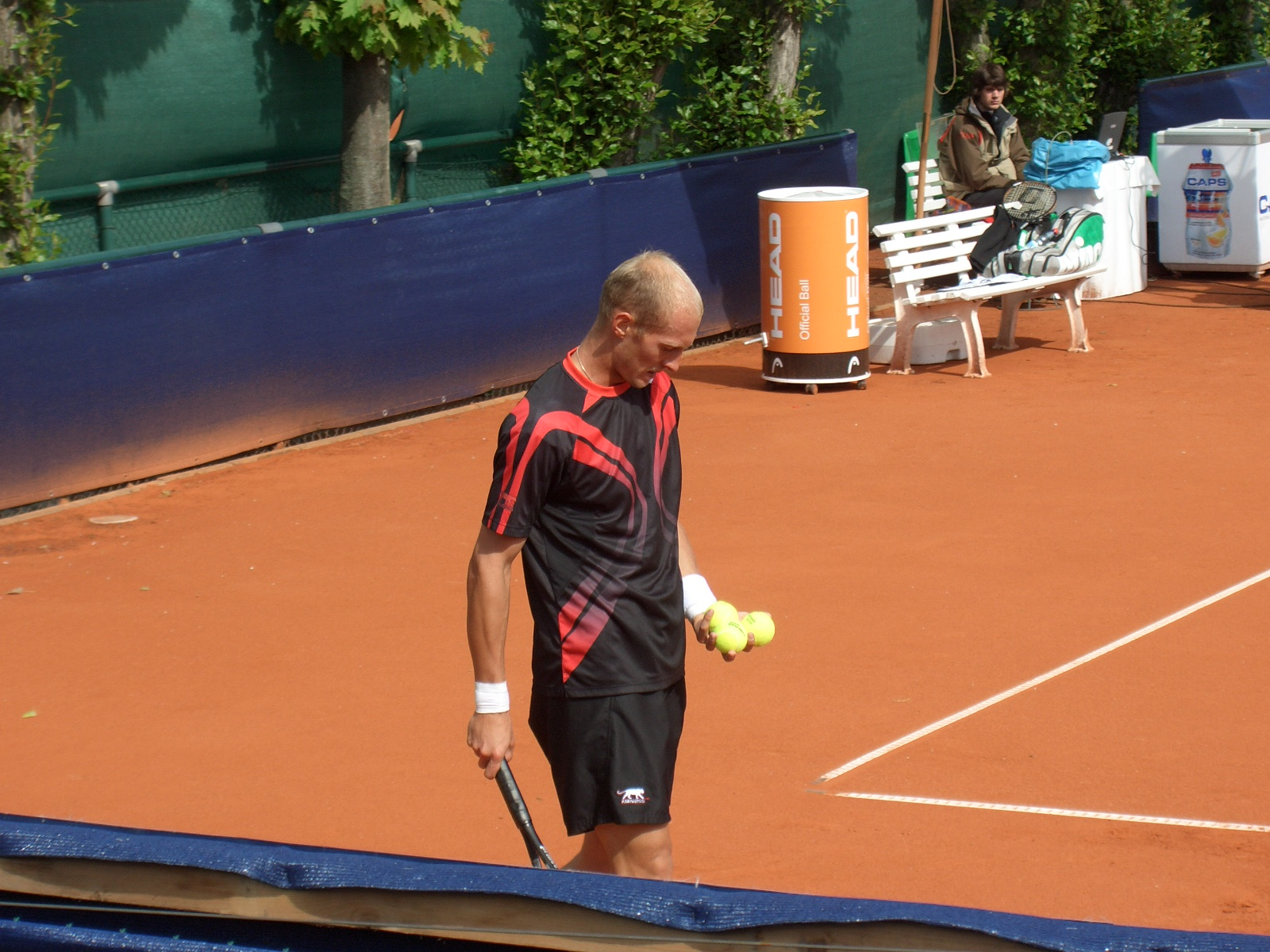
Davydenko was the top seed and defending champion of this event.

The 2010 International German Open was a men's tennis tournament played on outdoor red clay courts. It was the 104th edition of the event known that year as the International German Open and was part of the ATP World Tour 500 series of the 2010 ATP World Tour. It took place at the Am Rothenbaum in Hamburg, Germany, from 19 July through 25 July 2010. Unseeded Andrey Golubev won the singles title.

== Finals ==
=== Singles ===
(Kazakhstan) Andrey Golubev defeated (Austria) Jürgen Melzer, 6–3, 7–5

- It was Golubev's first career title. He was the first man from Kazakhstan to ever win an ATP title.

=== Doubles ===
(Spain) Marc López / (Spain) David Marrero defeated (France) Jérémy Chardy / (France) Paul-Henri Mathieu, 6–3, 2–6, [10–8]

== ATP entrants ==
=== Seeds ===
Player	Nation	Ranking*	Seeding
Nikolay Davydenko	RUS	6	1
David Ferrer	ESP	12	2
Jürgen Melzer	AUT	15	3
Gaël Monfils	FRA	17	4
Nicolás Almagro	ESP	20	5
Juan Carlos Ferrero	ESP	21	6
Thomaz Bellucci	BRA	22	7
Albert Montañés	ESP	30	8
Gilles Simon	FRA	33	9
Philipp Kohlschreiber	GER	35	10
Tommy Robredo	ESP	36	11
Victor Hănescu	ROU	37	12
Philipp Petzschner	GER	38	13
Guillermo García-López	ESP	39	14
Alexandr Dolgopolov	UKR	40	15
Michael Berrer	GER	45	16

*Seedings based on the July 12, 2010 rankings.

=== Other entrants ===
The following players received wildcards into the singles main draw:

- (Germany) Daniel Brands
- (Germany) Tobias Kamke
- (Germany) Julian Reister
- (Germany) Mischa Zverev

The following players received entry from the qualifying draw:

- (Italy) Simone Bolelli
- (Germany) Björn Phau
- (Spain) Rubén Ramírez Hidalgo
- (Spain) Pere Riba
- (Belgium) Christophe Rochus
- (Czech Republic) Lukáš Rosol

=== Withdrawals ===
The following notable players withdrew from the event:

- (Spain) David Ferrer
- (France) Richard Gasquet (back/rib injury)
- (Chile) Fernando González (knee injury)
- (France) Gaël Monfils
- (Argentina) Juan Mónaco (wrist injury)
