= Salzburg Zoo =

Zoo Salzburg
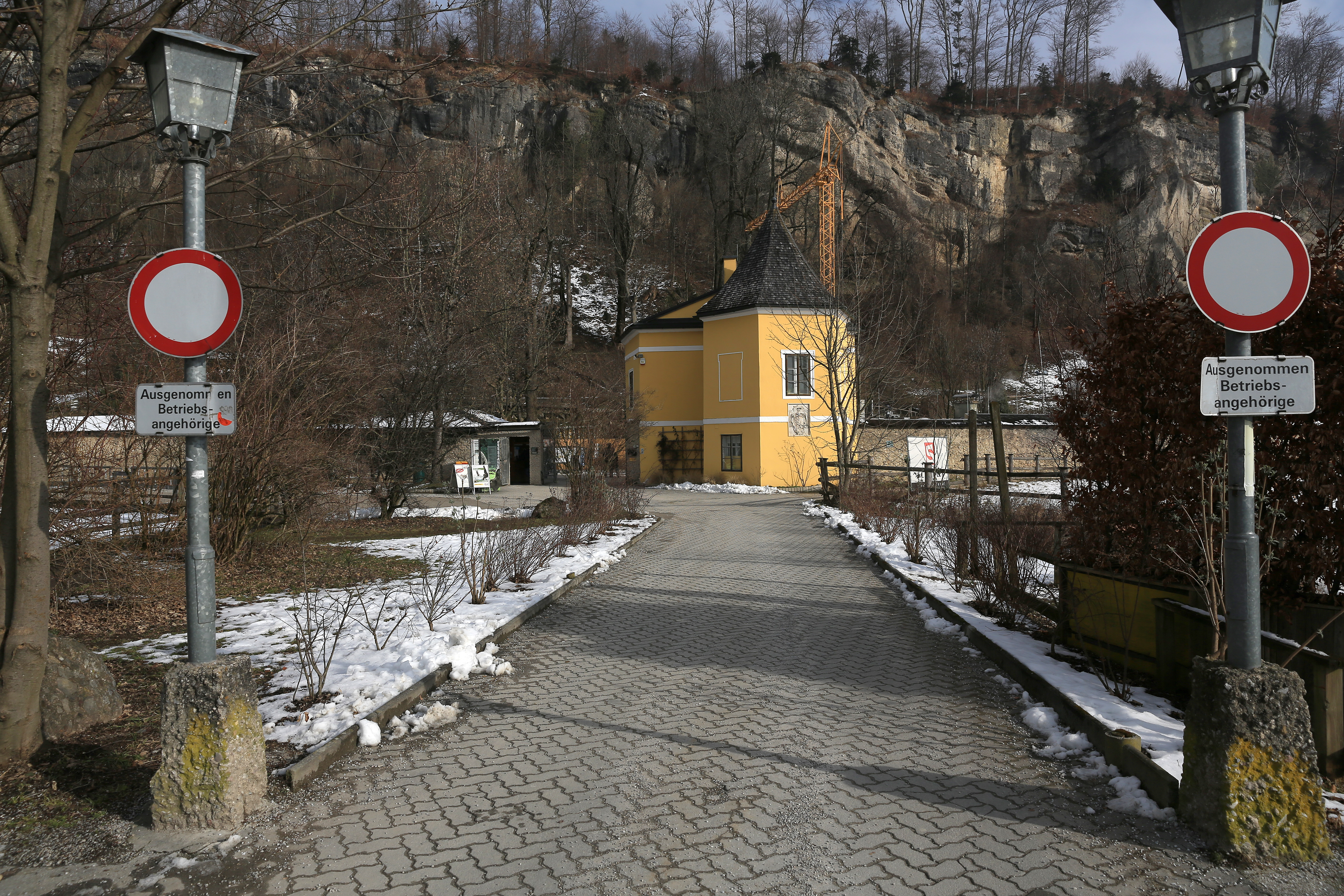
- Entrance
- Interactive map of Zoo Salzburg
- 47°45′25″N 13°03′51″E
- Date opened: 1961
- Location: Anifer Landesstr. 1, 5081 Anif
- Land area: 14 hectares (35 acres)
- No. of animals: 1200
- No. of species: 140
- Memberships: WAZA, EAZA, VDZ, OZO
- Owner: Zoo Salzburg Gem. GmbH
- Website: https://www.salzburg-zoo.at

Salzburg Zoo (German: Zoo Salzburg), also referred to as Tiergarten Hellbrunn, is a zoo in Salzburg, Salzburgerland, Austria.

== Animals ==
It is 14 hectares in size, and has 1500 animals from 150 species.

== Location ==
It is located in the south of the city, in Anifer Street, in the Anif District.
