= 2022 Salzburg Open – Singles =

Singles
- 2022 Salzburg Open

Final
- Champion: (Brazil) Thiago Monteiro
- Runner-up: (Slovakia) Norbert Gombos
- Score: 6–3, 7–6^{(7–2)}

Events
Singles	Doubles
- Salzburg Open

Facundo Bagnis was the defending champion but lost in the semifinals to Thiago Monteiro.

Monteiro won the title after defeating Norbert Gombos 6–3, 7–6^{(7–2)} in the final.

== Seeds ==
1. (France) Arthur Rinderknech (second round)
2. (Serbia) Dušan Lajović (quarterfinals)
3. (Czech Republic) Jiří Lehečka (second round)
4. (Spain) Roberto Carballés Baena (second round)
5. (Sweden) Mikael Ymer (second round)
6. (Brazil) Thiago Monteiro (champion)
7. (Argentina) Facundo Bagnis (semifinals)
8. (Spain) Fernando Verdasco (first round)

== Draw ==
Key

- Q = Qualifier
- WC = Wild card
- LL = Lucky loser
- Alt = Alternate
- ITF = ITF entry
- PR = Protected ranking
- SR = Special ranking
- SE = Special exempt
- JE = Junior exempt
- JR = Junior Accelerator Programme entrant
- CO = College Accelerator Programme entrant
- NG = Next Gen Accelerator Program entrant
- w/o = Walkover
- r = Retired
- d = Defaulted

=== Finals ===
Semifinals
(France) Corentin Moutet	6	5	3
(Slovakia) Norbert Gombos	3	7	6
7	(Argentina) Facundo Bagnis	6	5	3
6	(Brazil) Thiago Monteiro	3	7	6

Final
(Slovakia) Norbert Gombos	3	6^{2}
6	(Brazil) Thiago Monteiro	6	7^{7}

=== Top half ===
First round
1	(France) A Rinderknech	6	6
Q	(Ukraine) V Sachko	1	3
(France) G Simon	2	4
WC	(Austria) L Neumayer	6	6
(Sweden) E Ymer	4	3
(France) C Moutet	6	6
Alt	(Italy) A Arnaboldi	4	1
5	(Sweden) M Ymer	6	6
3	(Czech Republic) J Lehečka	6	4	6
PR	(Austria) S Ofner	3	6	4
Q	(Austria) L Miedler	4	6	0
LL	(Spain) P Martín Tiffon	6	3	6
(Italy) L Nardi	7	5	2
(Slovakia) N Gombos	5	7	6
(Italy) G Zeppieri	6	1	7^{7}
8/WC	(Spain) F Verdasco	1	6	6^{5}

Second round
1	(France) A Rinderknech	5	3
WC	(Austria) L Neumayer	7	6
(France) C Moutet	7^{7}	6
5	(Sweden) M Ymer	6^{2}	3
3	(Czech Republic) J Lehečka	4	4
LL	(Spain) P Martín Tiffon	6	6
(Slovakia) N Gombos	7	7^{7}
(Italy) G Zeppieri	5	6^{0}

Quarterfinals
WC	(Austria) L Neumayer	2	2
(France) C Moutet	6	6
LL	(Spain) P Martín Tiffon	3	1
(Slovakia) N Gombos	6	6

Semifinals
(France) C Moutet	6	5	3
(Slovakia) N Gombos	3	7	6

=== Bottom half ===
First round
7	(Argentina) F Bagnis	6	0
Q	(Argentina) F Díaz Acosta	2	0^{r}
WC	(Austria) D Thiem	6	7
Q	(Austria) F Misolic	4	5
Q	(Austria) M Neuchrist	7^{7}	6
(Czech Republic) Z Kolář	6^{5}	3
SE	(Serbia) H Međedović	4	1
4	(Spain) R Carballés Baena	6	6
6	(Brazil) T Monteiro	3	6	6
(Austria) J Rodionov	6	3	2
A Shevchenko	6	6
(France) M Guinard	2	3
(Austria) D Novak	6	7
Q	I Gakhov	2	5
(Czech Republic) D Svrčina	5	1
2	(Serbia) D Lajović	7	6

Second round
7	(Argentina) F Bagnis	6	2	6
WC	(Austria) D Thiem	3	6	4
Q	(Austria) M Neuchrist	6^{5}	6	7^{14}
4	(Spain) R Carballés Baena	7^{7}	3	6^{12}
6	(Brazil) T Monteiro	6	7^{7}
A Shevchenko	4	6^{4}
(Austria) D Novak	4	4
2	(Serbia) D Lajović	6	6

Quarterfinals
7	(Argentina) F Bagnis	6	6^{4}	6
Q	(Austria) M Neuchrist	2	7^{7}	2
6	(Brazil) T Monteiro	6	6^{2}	6
2	(Serbia) D Lajović	4	7^{7}	4

Semifinals
7	(Argentina) F Bagnis	6	5	3
6	(Brazil) T Monteiro	3	7	6
