= Andrey Golubev =

Kazakhstani tennis player

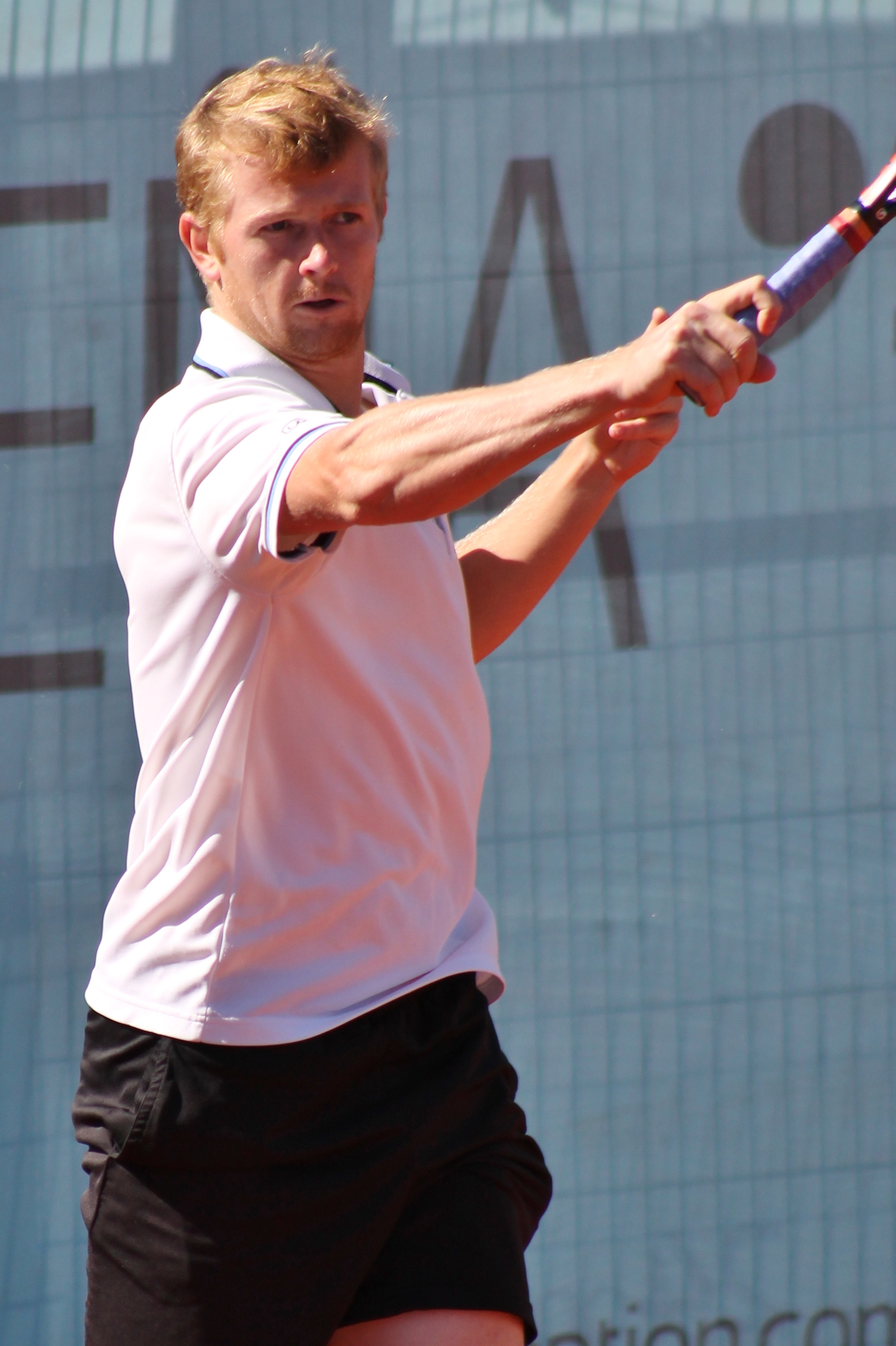
- Native name: Андре́й Го́лубев
- Country (sports): Russia (2005–2008); Kazakhstan (2008–)
- Born: July 22, 1987 (age 39) Volzhsky, Russian SFSR, Soviet Union
- Height: 1.80 m (5 ft 11 in)
- Turned pro: 2005
- Plays: Right-handed (one-handed backhand)
- Coach: Yuri Schukin, Massimo Puci
- Prize money: US $3,355,432

Singles
- Career record: 67–117
- Career titles: 1
- Highest ranking: No. 33 (4 October 2010)

Grand Slam singles results
- Australian Open: 2R (2010, 2012)
- French Open: 2R (2009)
- Wimbledon: 1R (2009, 2010, 2011, 2014)
- US Open: 2R (2008)

Doubles
- Career record: 91–131
- Career titles: 1
- Highest ranking: No. 21 (16 May 2022)

Grand Slam doubles results
- Australian Open: 3R (2021)
- French Open: F (2021)
- Wimbledon: 3R (2021)
- US Open: 3R (2021)

Other doubles tournaments
- Olympic Games: 1R (2021)

Grand Slam mixed doubles results
- Australian Open: 2R (2022)
- French Open: 1R (2022)

Team competitions
- Davis Cup: QF (2011, 2013, 2014, 2015, 2021)
- Hopman Cup: RR (2010, 2011)
Medal record
Men's tennis
Representing Kazakhstan
Asian Games
| Gold medal – first place | 2014 Incheon | Team Event |
- Last updated on: 1 September 2026.

Andrey Golubev (Russian: Андре́й Алекса́ндрович Го́лубев; born July 22, 1987) is a Kazakhstani professional tennis player. His career-high singles ranking is world No. 33, achieved on 4 October 2010, and his doubles ranking is world No. 21, achieved on 16 May 2022. Golubev won the 2010 International German Open, an ATP 500 event, to claim Kazakhstan's first-ever ATP Tour title in the Open Era. In 2021, he reached the French Open men's doubles final with Alexander Bublik, becoming the first Kazakhstani male players to contest a major final.

== Tennis career ==
Golubev has amassed a career record of 94–52 in the main draw of senior ITF Futures events (4 titles) and 90–63 in ATP Challenger events (3 titles).

=== Early career: 2003–2004 ===
Golubev's first senior ITF experience came primarily on the satellite tour in 2003. The first ranking point(s) earned by Golubev were from a four-week satellite tour in Serbia, and he gained another from a satellite event in Italy. In 2004, he turned his focus to attempting to qualify for futures and challenger events. His first appearance in the main draw of one of these events was from a wild card in the Arpa Ceramic Cup in Reggio Emilia, Italy, where he lost to world #219 Salvador Navarro, but did manage to win a set.

This performance earned him enough ranking points to qualify for a futures event in Helsingør, Denmark, where he had a strong run to the semifinals. He would get to at least the quarterfinals of three other events, all in Italy, including making his first final in L'Aquila, losing to Mathieu Montcourt. By the end of 2004, he was ranked as the 561st player in the world, with 25 ATP Entry Ranking points.

=== 2005 ===
Golubev continued to enter futures events in 2005, with his best performances a semifinal and a quarterfinal, until mid-May, when he won events on back-to-back weeks, the first in Grottaglie, the other in Teramo. The Grottaglie event was the first time that Golubev had ever been seeded in the main draw of a futures event, and as the #7 seed he survived losing the first set in the semifinals before beating #1 seed Malek Jaziri of Tunisia in the finals. Because of this win, he earned a special exemption for the Teramo event, where he continued his good form by beating #5 seed Alessandro Accardo in the final, having already taken out the tournament's #1 seed in the semis.

The schedule of rankings changes meant that both these events were added to the points count on the week of June 6, 2005, lifting Golubev up into the top 500 for the first time in his career.

In late July, Golubev earned his first direct acceptance into a challenger event, a clay court tournament in Valladolid, Spain. He was the lowest ranked player to receive direct acceptance, and managed to win his first match against a Spanish wildcard ranked outside the top 1000 in the world, before losing to an Australian qualifier.

In August, he won three straight qualifying matches to make the field for a challenger in Pamplona, where he would again make the second round. However, unable to consistently achieve strong results in the challengers, Golubev resumed playing futures events in September, making the finals in a November event in Sint-Genesius-Rode, Belgium. The ranking points from this event would be enough to move Golubev into the top 400 for the first time on November 21, 2005, and he finished the year ranked 393rd. Later in June, he earned a second wild card in Reggio Emilia, but lost his first round match.

Golubev also moved into the top 1000 in doubles in 2005, after making the semifinals of a futures event with Marco Gualdi. He would also move up by making the quarterfinals at three straight challengers, with three different partners. In September, at a futures event in Porto Torres, Italy, he teamed with Adriano Biasella and won the tournament, losing only a single set. He finished the year ranked #552 in doubles.

=== 2006 ===
Despite finishing the 2005 season with a career-high ranking, Golubev struggled to start the 2006 season, not making it beyond the quarterfinals of a futures event until mid-May and dropping back below the 400th ranking place in mid-March. He returned to the top 400 after making the finals in Vicenza, rising to a new career-high ranking, but in this tournament he benefited from drawing a wild card in his first match, and getting both a withdrawal and a retirement from other opponents.

He returned to the challenger circuit for the start of June, qualifying for an event in Turin, where he lost in the first round, but his ranking suffered a major blow when his two wins from the previous season dropped off, sending him down to #448. Despite this setback, Golubev had a major breakthrough in Milan, where, as a wild card, he won back-to-back challenger matches for the first time, progressing to the quarterfinals before losing to Sydney Olympic bronze medalist Arnaud Di Pasquale.

His next three attempts at qualifying for challengers, though, all failed, so he again returned to the futures circuit, but with more success than his early season appearances, making finals at both Modena and Piombino, and returning him to the top 400. He briefly dropped back below this line, but came back up after a good challenger performance in Grenoble, where he won five straight matches, four in three sets, to qualify and make the quarterfinals.

Golubev again focused on futures play to end the season, and had some significant success. He defeated Adrian Mannarino in the final of an event in Rodez to set a new career-high ranking of #336, then made back to back finals in November, losing in Redbridge, England, and winning over Jeroen Masson in Las Palmas de Gran Canaria, further boosting his ranking to #303, and ending the year ranked #305 in the world.

Golubev's ranking also improved in doubles, though not by as wide a margin. After making two tournament finals in June, he moved into the top 500, and nearly ended up in the top 400 before inactivity at the end of the season cost him points and dropped him back below #500. He finished the year ranked 510th in doubles.

=== 2007 ===
Golubev's first tournament of 2007 was a first for him, as he attempted to qualify for his first ATP International Series event, the Qatar ExxonMobil Open in Doha. He lost his first match in straight sets, but continued his attempts to qualify for large events when he entered qualifying for the Australian Open. In Melbourne, he won his first qualifying match against Ernests Gulbis, but lost the second and failed to advance. Still, the ranking points that this attempt garnered moved Golubev into the top 300 for the first time in his career.

Through the early months of the year, Golubev continued to attempt to qualify for both ATP and challenger events, with no success. He made the final round of qualifying on several occasions, including losing to Radek Štěpánek at the Open 13 in Marseille.

He was able to gain direct acceptance to a challenger event in Rome in May, his first appearance in a main draw since September 2006, making the quarterfinals. His first challenger semifinal appearance came in Sassuolo a month later, as he won six straight matches to move into the top 250 for the first time. This made it easier to earn direct acceptance to challengers, and also helped him enter Wimbledon qualifying. In his first major event on grass, Golubev defeated #1 seed Olivier Patience, but fell short in the final round, losing his first five-set match to Wang Yeu-Tzuoo, and failing to qualify.

Wang would serve as Golubev's nemesis again, later in July at Recanati, where Golubev beat Rainer Schüttler and Gilles Müller to make his first challenger-level final, where he again lost to Wang, this time managing to take a set from him. This performance lifted him into the top 200 for the first time in his career.

He would continue to play challengers for the remainder of the season, with his best result coming in Grenoble, where he made the semifinals. In late October, Golubev again attempted to qualify for an ATP tour event, this time the Davidoff Swiss Indoors in Basel. This time, he was successful, not dropping a set in qualifying, and so made his first career ATP International Series main draw. He would actually improve on this, winning his first ATP match over American Amer Delić, and winning a set from #8 seed Paul-Henri Mathieu before losing the next two to go out. He would finish his season ranked #177.

Golubev played fairly few doubles matches in 2007, but did record his first career challenger victory at Mantua with Francesco Piccari, and again teamed with Piccari to make the semi-finals in Cordenons. He reached a new career high doubles ranking of #350 after these results, and finished the year at #389.

=== 2008–2009: Grand Slam debut, first ATP final ===
Golubev began the season by qualifying for his second ATP event, the Next Generation Adelaide International, but lost to a man he had beaten in Australia the year before, Ernests Gulbis, in the first round. In Australian Open qualifying, Golubev again fell short at the second round, but this time he quickly moved on to a challenger event in Heilbronn, Germany, where he reeled off eight straight wins, including beating #1 seed Florian Mayer and Philipp Petzschner in the final, winning his first career challenger event, and putting him to a new career-high ranking of 135. Despite being inactive, shifts from other players moved Golubev to his current career-high of No. 132 on February 11.

Golubev again attempted to qualify for the 2008 Open 13 in Marseille, but fell just one set short, losing to Ivan Dodig. He then went on a long losing streak, failing to win a singles match between mid-February and mid-April. This included a failure in his first attempt to qualify for an ATP Masters Series event, losing in the first qualifying round at Monte Carlo.

He won a match in qualifying for the Open Sabadell Atlántico in Barcelona to end a seven-game losing streak, but did not win consecutive matches until a quarterfinal in a challenger in Sanremo. He attempted to qualify for both Wimbledon, and, for the first time, the 2008 French Open, but failed in both attempts, losing in the second round of Wimbledon qualifying.

Golubev reached another new milestone at the 2008 Canada Masters in Toronto, beating Phillip King and Rohan Bopanna to qualify for his first career ATP Masters series event main draw. He lost his first round match, though, to veteran Thomas Johansson of Sweden.

Golubev continued his attempts to qualify for ATP level events, succeeding at the 2008 Countrywide Classic in Los Angeles, but losing in the first round to Florent Serra. and falling one match short in Washington, D.C., at the Legg Mason Tennis Classic.

Golubev entered qualifying for the US Open for the first time in 2008, losing in the final round to Switzerland's Stéphane Bohli. However, when Juan Carlos Ferrero pulled out of the tournament, Golubev was chosen as the lucky loser to replace him, and made his Grand Slam debut against an American wildcard, Brendan Evans. Golubev defeated Evans in three sets, but then lost to seventh seed David Nalbandian in the second round.

Golubev has had another year of only light doubles play, with his best result a semifinal with Francesco Piccari in Córdoba.

He reached the final of the 2008 St. Petersburg Open. His first win came against Olivier Rochus, where he prevailed 6–1, 6–4. He then surprised home hero Marat Safin in the second round, beating the Russian 6–4, 6–2 to progress to the quarterfinals. His next opponent was Mischa Zverev, whom he beat 6–7, 6–4, 7–6. He then went on to beat Victor Hănescu 6–3, 6–0 in the semifinals, but lost to Andy Murray 1–6, 1–6 in the final.

Golubev reached the second round of the 2009 French Open in singles, his best showing at a Grand Slam thus far.

=== 2010: Best singles season, Historic first ATP title for Kazakhstan and top 40 career-high singles ranking ===
Golubev began the year by reaching his first Australian Open 2nd round by upsetting Ivan Ljubičić 3–6, 6–3, 2–6, 3–6 but losing to Mardy Fish in the following round 6–2, 1–6, 6–3, 6–3. He then reached the final of the 2010 Intersport Heilbronn Open challenger losing to Michael Berrer 3–6, 6–7. he then suffered first round losts in the 2010 ABN AMRO World Tennis Tournament and 2010 PBZ Zagreb Indoors. He then came back to the challengers of the 2010 GEMAX Open, where he retired in the quarterfinals against Ilija Bozoljac, 4–6, 3–5 ret. Representing Kazakhstan against South Korea, he was able to win both of his matches in straight sets. At the challengers of the 2010 BMW Tennis Championship, he fell in the second round to Michael Berrer.

He was able to qualify in the 2010 BNP Paribas Open, but lost to Daniel Gimeno Traver 6–3, 6–4 in the first round. At the 2010 Tennis Napoli Cup challengers, he fell to Rui Machado, 6–3 6–3 in the semifinals. He then reached the second round of the 2010 Grand Prix Hassan II and as a qualifier in the 2010 Monte-Carlo Rolex Masters, falling to Richard Gasquet and David Ferrer, respectively. Golubev fell in the qualifications of the 2010 Internazionali BNL d'Italia. In a Davis Cup tie against China, he again won both his matches to give Kazakhstan a play-off spot.

He then suffered first-round loses in the 2010 French Open, 2010 Aegon Championships, Aegon International, and 2010 Wimbledon Championships. However, he reach the semifinals of the challenger 2010 UniCredit Czech Open, losing to Radek Štěpánek, 6–3, 6–2. At the 2010 Swedish Open, he lost in the second round to Tommy Robredo, 3–6, 6–3, 6–2.

Golubev played world No. 6 and defending champion Nikolay Davydenko in the 2010 International German Open to earn a spot in the quarterfinals, and then defeated Denis Istomin, 6–4, 6–1 to earn a semifinal berth. He then defeated Jürgen Melzer in the final, 6–3, 7–5, earning his first ATP World Tour title and becoming the first man from Kazakhstan to win an ATP World Tour title.

Golubev followed this up by reaching the final of the 2010 Proton Malaysian Open, losing to US Open semifinalist Mikhail Youzhny, having won the first set. As a result, he reached a career-high in singles of World No. 33 on 4 October 2010. He finished the year in the top 40 at World No. 36.

=== 2011–2012 ===
Golubev reached two second rounds in two consecutive years at the 2011 and at the 2012 Indian Wells Masters as a qualifier, his best showing at this Masters 1000. Golubev lost to Rafael Nadal in the first round of the 2011 US Open in straight sets, but he led early in each of the sets 3–1 in the first, 3–0 in the second, and 3–1 in the third, and was able to hold to force the second set into a tiebreak. The final score was 4–6, 6–7, 5–7.

Golubev reached the second round of the 2012 Australian Open his best showing at this Grand Slam equaling his showing at the 2010 Australian Open.

=== 2020: Six ATP Challenger titles ===
In 2020 he won five consecutive ATP Challenger titles and six overall for the season.

=== 2021: Historic French Open final, third ATP final, Olympics & top 25 debut in doubles ===
Partnering with fellow Kazakh Alexander Bublik, Golubev reached the third round of the 2021 Australian Open his best showing in his career at this Major, after a five-year non-participation at a Grand Slam level in doubles, defeating top pair R. Farrah/J.S. Cabal.

The pair Golubev/Bublik went two steps further and reached the semifinals of the 2021 French Open defeating No. 5 seeded Ivan Dodig/Filip Polášek (second round), No. 11 seeded Wesley Koolhof/Jean-Julien Rojer (third round) and Hugo Nys/Tim Pütz (quarterfinals) en route, Golubev's best showing at this Grand Slam since the doubles semifinal of the 2014 French Open partnering with Samuel Groth. In the semifinal the Kazakh duo defeated the Spanish duo Pablo Andújar/Pedro Martínez who were both making their Grand Slam semifinals doubles debut. They played in the final against the French home favorites Nicolas Mahut/Pierre-Hugues Herbert, but they lost 6−4, 6−7, 4−6. With this run, Golubev improved his ranking, entering the top 40 at No. 39 on 14 June, from his best doubles ranking of No. 65 reached on 23 March 2015.

At the 2021 Wimbledon Championships he reached the third round for the first time at this Major partnering Robin Haase. As a result, he reached a career high ranking of No. 35 in doubles on 19 July 2021. He reached the third round at the 2021 US Open (tennis) as well for the first time partnering Andreas Mies. At the 2021 St. Petersburg Open he reached his second ATP doubles final of the season and third in his career partnering Hugo Nys. As a result, he made his debut into the top 30 in the doubles rankings at World No. 28 on 1 November and top 25 debut on 8 November 2021.

=== 2023–2024: First ATP doubles title, retirement ===
He reached his fourth final in two years with Denys Molchanov at the 2023 Stockholm Open and won his first career title in doubles. Golubev became the second Kazakhstani player to win an ATP Tour doubles title in the Open Era after Aleksandr Nedovyesov lifted the trophy in Bastad in the same season.

In September 2024, Golubev announced his retirement from professional tennis.

== Change in nationality ==
For the first years of his career, up to and including 2008 Wimbledon, Golubev competed as an athlete from Russia. However, before the 2008 Canada Masters, he changed his affiliation, appearing on the draw as an athlete from Kazakhstan, and his ATP profile now reflects this. He has been living and training in Piedmont, Italy since he was 15 years old and despite naturalizing as an Italian citizen he decided not to represent Italy in his career, preferring Kazakhstan.

== Grand Slam tournament finals ==
=== Doubles: 1 (1 runner-up) ===
| Result | Year | Championship | Surface | Partner | Opponents | Score |
|---|---|---|---|---|---|---|
| Loss | 2021 | French Open | Clay | (Kazakhstan) Alexander Bublik | (France) Pierre-Hugues Herbert (France) Nicolas Mahut | 6–4, 6–7^{(1–7)}, 4–6 |

== ATP career finals ==
=== Singles: 3 (1 title, 2 runners-up) ===
Legend
Grand Slam (0–0)
ATP World Tour Finals (0–0)
ATP World Tour Masters 1000 (0–0)
ATP World Tour 500 Series (1–0)
ATP World Tour 250 Series (0–2)

| Result | W–L | Date | Tournament | Tier | Surface | Opponent | Score |
|---|---|---|---|---|---|---|---|
| Loss | 0–1 | Oct 2008 | St. Petersburg Open, Russia | International | Hard (i) | (United Kingdom) Andy Murray | 1–6, 1–6 |
| Win | 1–1 | Jul 2010 | International German Open, Germany | 500 Series | Clay | (Austria) Jürgen Melzer | 6–3, 7–5 |
| Loss | 1–2 | Sep 2010 | Malaysian Open, Malaysia | 250 Series | Hard (i) | (Russia) Mikhail Youzhny | 7–6^{(9–7)}, 2–6, 6–7^{(3–7)} |

=== Doubles: 4 (1 title, 3 runners-up) ===
Legend
Grand Slam (0–1)
ATP World Tour Finals (0–0)
ATP World Tour Masters 1000 (0–0)
ATP World Tour 500 Series (0–0)
ATP World Tour 250 Series (1–2)

| Result | W–L | Date | Tournament | Tier | Surface | Partner | Opponents | Score |
|---|---|---|---|---|---|---|---|---|
| Loss | 0–1 | Aug 2014 | Austrian Open Kitzbühel, Austria | 250 Series | Clay | (Italy) Daniele Bracciali | (Finland) Henri Kontinen (Finland) Jarkko Nieminen | 1–6, 4–6 |
| Loss | 0–2 | Jun 2021 | French Open, France | Grand Slam | Clay | (Kazakhstan) Alexander Bublik | (France) Pierre-Hugues Herbert (France) Nicolas Mahut | 6–4, 6–7^{(1–7)}, 4–6 |
| Loss | 0–3 | Oct 2021 | St. Petersburg Open, Russia | 250 Series | Hard (i) | (Monaco) Hugo Nys | (United Kingdom) Jamie Murray (Brazil) Bruno Soares | 3–6, 4–6 |
| Win | 1–3 | Oct 2023 | Stockholm Open, Sweden | 250 Series | Hard (i) | (Ukraine) Denys Molchanov | (India) Yuki Bhambri (United Kingdom) Julian Cash | 7–6^{(10–8)}, 6–2 |

== ATP Challenger and ITF Futures finals ==
=== Singles: 23 (12–11) ===
| Legend (singles) ATP Challenger Tour (7–5) ITF Futures Tour (5–6) | Finals by surface Hard (9–7) Clay (3–3) Grass (0–0) Carpet (0–1) |

| Result | W–L | Date | Tournament | Tier | Surface | Opponent | Score |
|---|---|---|---|---|---|---|---|
| Loss | 0–1 | Aug 2004 | Italy F20, L'Aquila | Futures | Clay | (France) Mathieu Montcourt | 2–6, 2–6 |
| Win | 1–1 | May 2005 | Italy F13, Grottaglie | Futures | Clay | (Tunisia) Malek Jaziri | 6–3, 7–6^{(7–3)} |
| Win | 2–1 | May 2005 | Italy F14, Teramo | Futures | Clay | (Italy) Alessandro Accardo | 6–3, 6–1 |
| Loss | 2–2 | Nov 2005 | Belgium F2, Waterloo | Futures | Carpet | (Switzerland) Stéphane Bohli | 3–6, 4–6 |
| Loss | 2–3 | May 2006 | Italy F13, Vicenza | Futures | Clay | (France) Ludwig Pellerin | 3–6, 3–6 |
| Loss | 2–4 | Jul 2006 | Italy F24, Modena | Futures | Clay | (Ukraine) Alexandr Dolgopolov | 6–4, 6–7^{(8–10)}, 6–7^{(9–11)} |
| Loss | 2–5 | Sep 2006 | Italy F29, Piombino | Futures | Hard | (Denmark) Frederik Nielsen | 2–6, 4–6 |
| Win | 3–5 | Oct 2006 | France F19, Rodez | Futures | Hard | (France) Adrian Mannarino | 4–6, 6–1, 6–0 |
| Loss | 3–6 | Nov 2006 | Great Britain F17, Redridge | Futures | Hard | (France) David Guez | 4–6, 2–6 |
| Win | 4–6 | Nov 2006 | Spain F37, Las Palmas | Futures | Hard | (Belgium) Jeroen Masson | 6–4, 6–3 |
| Loss | 4–7 | Jul 2007 | Recanati, Italy | Challenger | Hard | (Chinese Taipei) Jimmy Wang | 3–6, 6–3, 4–6 |
| Win | 5–7 | Jan 2008 | Heilbronn, Germany | Challenger | Hard | (Germany) Philipp Petzschner | 2–6, 6–1, 3–1 ret. |
| Win | 6–7 | Nov 2008 | Astana, Kazakhstan | Challenger | Hard | (France) Laurent Recouderc | 1–6, 7–5, 6–3 |
| Loss | 6–8 | Jul 2009 | Recanati, Italy | Challenger | Hard | (Denmark) Stéphane Bohli | 4–6, 6–7^{(4–7)} |
| Win | 7–8 | Nov 2009 | Astana, Kazakhstan | Challenger | Hard | (Ukraine) Illya Marchenko | 6–3, 6–3 |
| Loss | 7–9 | Jan 2010 | Heilbronn, Germany | Challenger | Hard | (Germany) Michael Berrer | 3–6, 6–7^{(4–7)} |
| Win | 8–9 | Jun 2013 | Marburg, Germany | Challenger | Clay | (Argentina) Diego Schwartzman | 6–1, 6–3 |
| Loss | 8–10 | Oct 2013 | Kazan, Russia | Challenger | Hard | (Ukraine) Oleksandr Nedovyesov | 4–6, 1–6 |
| Win | 9–10 | Nov 2013 | Tyumen, Russia | Challenger | Hard | (Russia) Andrey Kuznetsov | 6–4, 6–3 |
| Win | 10–10 | Feb 2014 | Astana, Kazakhstan | Challenger | Hard | (Luxembourg) Gilles Müller | 6–4, 6–4 |
| Loss | 10–11 | Feb 2016 | Launceston, Australia | Challenger | Hard | (Australia) Blake Mott | 7–6^{(7–4)}, 1–6, 2–6 |
| Win | 11–11 | Mar 2016 | Jönköping, Sweden | Challenger | Hard | (Russia) Karen Khachanov | 6–7^{(9–11)}, 7–6^{(7–5)}, 7–6^{(7–4)} |
| Win | 12–11 | Jul 2019 | M15 Almaty, Kazakhstan | World Tennis Tour | Hard | (Kazakhstan) Denis Yevseyev | 6–1, 6–2 |

=== Doubles: 36 (21–15) ===
| Legend (doubles) ATP Challenger Tour (17–13) ITF Futures Tour (4–2) | Finals by surface Hard (8–3) Clay (13–12) Grass (0–0) Carpet (0–0) |

| Result | W–L | Date | Tournament | Tier | Surface | Partner | Opponents | Score |
|---|---|---|---|---|---|---|---|---|
| Win | 1–0 | Sep 2005 | Italy F30, Sassari | Futures | Hard | (Italy) Adriano Biasella | (Uzbekistan) Farrukh Dustov (Mexico) Manuel Gasbarri | 7–6^{(8–6)}, 6–1 |
| Loss | 1–1 | May 2006 | Italy F15, Parma | Futures | Clay | (Brazil) Márcio Torres | (Spain) José Antonio Sánchez de Luna (Italy) Tomas Tenconi | 0–6, 0–6 |
| Loss | 1–2 | Jun 2006 | Italy F18, Bassano | Futures | Clay | (Uzbekistan) Denis Istomin | (Italy) Fabio Colangelo (Italy) Stefano Ianni | 4–6, 4–6 |
| Win | 2–2 | Jul 2007 | Mantua, Italy | Challenger | Clay | (Italy) Francesco Piccari | (Italy) Leonardo Azzaro (Italy) Marco Crugnola | 6–3, 6–2 |
| Loss | 2–3 | Jul 2009 | Racanati, Italy | Challenger | Hard | (Italy) Adriano Biasella | (Denmark) Frederik Nielsen (Australia) Joseph Sirianni | 4–6, 6–3, [6–10] |
| Loss | 2–4 | Sep 2011 | Szczecin, Poland | Challenger | Clay | (Kazakhstan) Yuriy Schukin | (Poland) Andriej Kapaś (Poland) Marcin Gawron | 3–6, 4–6 |
| Win | 3–4 | Jun 2012 | Monza, Italy | Challenger | Clay | (Kazakhstan) Yuriy Schukin | (Russia) Teymuraz Gabashvili (Italy) Stefano Ianni | 7–6^{(7–4)}, 5–7, [10–7] |
| Loss | 3–5 | Jul 2012 | Milan, Italy | Challenger | Clay | (Kazakhstan) Yuriy Schukin | (United States) Nicholas Monroe (Germany) Simon Stadler | 4–6, 6–3, [9–11] |
| Loss | 3–6 | Sep 2012 | Lermontov, Russia | Challenger | Clay | (Kazakhstan) Yuriy Schukin | (Russia) Konstantin Kravchuk (Ukraine) Denys Molchanov | 3–6, 4–6 |
| Win | 4–6 | Apr 2013 | Italy F4, Padua | Futures | Clay | (Italy) Matteo Donati | (Croatia) Mate Delić (Croatia) Joško Topić | 7–6^{(8–6)}, 3–6, [10–6] |
| Loss | 4–7 | May 2013 | Napoli, Italy | Challenger | Clay | (Italy) Alessandro Giannessi | (Italy) Stefano Ianni (Italy) Potito Sterace | 1–6, 3–6 |
| Win | 5–7 | Jun 2013 | Marburg, Germany | Challenger | Clay | (Kazakhstan) Evgeny Korolev | (Netherlands) Jesse Huta Galung (Australia) Jordan Kerr | 6–3, 1–6, [10–6] |
| Loss | 5–8 | Jul 2013 | Astana, Kazakhstan | Challenger | Hard | (Kazakhstan) Mikhail Kukushkin | (Italy) Claudio Grassi (Italy) Riccardo Ghedin | 6–3, 3–6, [8–10] |
| Loss | 5–9 | Feb 2014 | Astana, Kazakhstan | Challenger | Hard | (Kazakhstan) Evgeny Korolev | (Belarus) Sergey Betov (Belarus) Aliaksandr Bury | 1–6, 4–6 |
| Win | 6–9 | Jan 2016 | Happy Valley, Australia | Challenger | Hard | (Italy) Matteo Donati | (Kazakhstan) Aleksandr Nedovyesov (Ukraine) Denys Molchanov | 3–6, 7–6^{(7–5)}, [10–1] |
| Win | 7–9 | May 2016 | Vicenza, Italy | Challenger | Clay | (Croatia) Nikola Mektić | (Portugal) Gastão Elias (Brazil) Fabrício Neis | 6–3, 6–3 |
| Win | 8–9 | Jun 2016 | Poprad-Tatry, Slovakia | Challenger | Clay | (Uruguay) Ariel Behar | (Slovakia) Andrej Martin (Poland) Lukáš Dlouhý | 6–2, 5–7, [10–5] |
| Win | 9–9 | Jul 2019 | M15 Almaty, Kazakhstan | World Tennis Tour | Hard | (Russia) Konstantin Kravchuk | (Kazakhstan) Denis Yevseyev (United States) Sebastian Korda | 6–3, 6–2 |
| Win | 10–9 | Jul 2019 | Nur-Sultan, Kazakhstan | Challenger | Hard | (Kazakhstan) Aleksandr Nedovyesov | (South Korea) Yunseong Chung (South Korea) Ji Sung Nam | 6–4, 6–4 |
| Loss | 10–10 | Jul 2019 | Prague, Czech Republic | Challenger | Clay | (Kazakhstan) Aleksandr Nedovyesov | (Uruguay) Ariel Behar (Ecuador) Gonzalo Escobar | 7–6^{(7–4)}, 5–7, [8–10] |
| Win | 11–10 | Aug 2019 | M25+H Appiano, Italy | World Tennis Tour | Clay | (Portugal) Felipe Meligeni Rodrigues Alves | (Brazil) Daniel Dutra da Silva (Sweden) Christian Lindell | 6–4, 6–4 |
| Win | 12–10 | Sep 2019 | Istanbul, Turkey | Challenger | Hard | (Kazakhstan) Aleksandr Nedovyesov | (Czech Republic) Lukáš Rosol (Czech Republic) Marek Gengel | walkover |
| Loss | 12–11 | Sep 2019 | Biella, Italy | Challenger | Clay | (Uruguay) Ariel Behar | (Croatia) Ante Pavić (Bosnia and Herzegovina) Tomislav Brkić | 6–7^{(2–7)}, 4-6 |
| Win | 13–11 | Jan 2020 | Bangkok, Thailand | Challenger | Hard | (Kazakhstan) Aleksandr Nedovyesov | (Indonesia) Christopher Rungkat (Thailand) Sanchai Ratiwatana | 3–6, 7–6^{(7–1)}, [10–5] |
| Win | 14–11 | Feb 2020 | Quimper, France | Challenger | Hard | (Kazakhstan) Aleksandr Nedovyesov | (Croatia) Ivan Sabanov (Croatia) Matej Sabanov | 6-4, 6-2 |
| Win | 15–11 | Aug 2020 | Todi, Italy | Challenger | Clay | (Uruguay) Ariel Behar | (France) Hugo Gaston (France) Elliot Benchetrit | 6-4, 6-2 |
| Win | 16–11 | Aug 2020 | Trieste, Italy | Challenger | Clay | (Uruguay) Ariel Behar | (France) Hugo Gaston (France) Tristan Lamasine | 6-4, 6-2 |
| Win | 17–11 | Sep 2020 | Cordenons, Italy | Challenger | Clay | (Uruguay) Ariel Behar | (Argentina) Andrés Molteni (France) Hugo Nys | 7-5, 6-4 |
| Loss | 17–12 | Sep 2020 | Forlì, Italy | Challenger | Clay | (Italy) Andrea Vavassori | (Bosnia and Herzegovina) Tomislav Brkić (Serbia) Nikola Ćaćić | 6–3, 5–7, [3–10] |
| Win | 18–12 | Nov 2020 | Orlando, United States | Challenger | Hard | (Kazakhstan) Aleksandr Nedovyesov | (United States) Mitchell Krueger (United States) Jackson Withrow | 7-5, 6-4 |
| Win | 19–12 | Apr 2021 | Split, Croatia | Challenger | Clay | (Kazakhstan) Aleksandr Nedovyesov | (Poland) Szymon Walków (Poland) Jan Zieliński | 7–5, 6–7^{(5–7)}, [10–5] |
| Loss | 19–13 | May 2021 | Zagreb, Croatia | Challenger | Clay | (Kazakhstan) Aleksandr Nedovyesov | (United States) Evan King (United States) Hunter Reese | 2-6, 6-7^{(4–7)} |
| Loss | 19–14 | Apr 2023 | Rome, Italy | Challenger | Clay | (Ukraine) Denys Molchanov | (Colombia) Nicolás Barrientos (Portugal) Francisco Cabral | 3–6, 1–6 |
| Win | 20–14 | May 2023 | Turin, Italy | Challenger | Clay (Note: The final itself was played on indoor hard due to rain.) | (Ukraine) Denys Molchanov | (United States) Nathaniel Lammons (Australia) John Peers | 7–6^{(7–4)}, 6–7^{(6–8)}, [10–5] |
| Win | 21–14 | Jul 2023 | Salzburg, Austria | Challenger | Clay | (Ukraine) Denys Molchanov | (India) Anirudh Chandrasekar (India) Vijay Sundar Prashanth | 6–4, 7–6^{(10–8)} |
| Loss | 21–15 | Aug 2023 | Banja Luka, Bosnia and Herzegovina | Challenger | Clay | (Ukraine) Denys Molchanov | (Romania) Victor Vlad Cornea (Austria) Philipp Oswald | 6–3, 1–6, [13–15] |

== Performance timelines ==
Key
| W | F | SF | QF | #R | RR | Q# | P# | DNQ | A | Z# | PO | G | S | B | NMS | NTI | P | NH |

(W) winner; (F) finalist; (SF) semifinalist; (QF) quarterfinalist; (#R) rounds 4, 3, 2, 1; (RR) round-robin stage; (Q#) qualification round; (P#) preliminary round; (DNQ) did not qualify; (A) absent; (Z#) Davis/Fed Cup Zonal Group (with number indication) or (PO) play-off; (G) gold, (S) silver or (B) bronze Olympic/Paralympic medal; (NMS) not a Masters tournament; (NTI) not a Tier I tournament; (P) postponed; (NH) not held; (SR) strike rate (events won / competed); (W–L) win–loss record.
To avoid confusion and double counting, these charts are updated at the conclusion of a tournament or when the player's participation has ended.

=== Singles ===
| Tournament | 2007 | 2008 | 2009 | 2010 | 2011 | 2012 | 2013 | 2014 | 2015 | 2016 | 2017 | SR | W–L | Win % |
|---|---|---|---|---|---|---|---|---|---|---|---|---|---|---|
Grand Slam tournaments
| Australian Open | Q2 | Q2 | 1R | 2R | 1R | 2R | Q1 | 1R | 1R | Q1 | Q1 | 0 / 6 | 2–6 | 25.00 |
| French Open | A | Q1 | 2R | 1R | 1R | Q1 | Q1 | 1R | 1R | Q3 | A | 0 / 5 | 1–5 | 16.67 |
| Wimbledon | Q3 | Q2 | 1R | 1R | 1R | A | A | 1R | A | Q1 | A | 0 / 4 | 0–4 | 0.00 |
| US Open | A | 2R | 1R | 1R | 1R | Q2 | Q3 | 1R | Q2 | Q1 | A | 0 / 5 | 1–5 | 16.67 |
| Win–loss | 0–0 | 1–1 | 1–4 | 1–4 | 0–4 | 1–1 | 0–0 | 0–4 | 0–2 | 0–0 | 0–0 | 0 / 20 | 4–20 | 17% |
ATP World Tour Masters 1000
| Indian Wells Masters | A | A | A | A | 2R | 2R | Q1 | 1R | 2R | A | A | 0 / 4 | 3–4 | 43% |
| Miami Open | A | A | Q2 | 1R | 1R | Q1 | A | 1R | 1R | A | A | 0 / 4 | 0–4 | 0% |
| Monte-Carlo Masters | A | Q1 | Q1 | 2R | 1R | A | A | A | Q1 | A | A | 0 / 2 | 1–2 | 33% |
| Madrid Open | A | A | A | A | 1R | A | A | 1R | A | A | A | 0 / 2 | 0–2 | 0% |
| Italian Open | A | Q1 | Q1 | Q2 | 1R | A | 1R | 2R | A | A | A | 0 / 3 | 1–3 | 25% |
| Canadian Open | A | 1R | 2R | Q1 | 1R | A | A | A | A | A | A | 0 / 3 | 1–3 | 25% |
| Cincinnati Masters | A | A | Q1 | Q1 | 2R | A | A | A | A | A | A | 0 / 1 | 1–1 | 50% |
| Shanghai Masters | NH | | A | 1R | A | A | A | 1R | A | A | A | 0 / 2 | 0–2 | 0% |
| Paris Masters | A | A | A | 1R | A | A | A | Q1 | A | A | A | 0 / 1 | 0–1 | 0% |
| Win–loss | 0–0 | 0–1 | 1–1 | 1–4 | 2–7 | 1–1 | 0–1 | 1–5 | 1–2 | 0–0 | 0–0 | 7 / 22 | 7–22 | 24% |
Career statistics
| Titles–Finals | 0–0 | 0–1 | 0–0 | 1–2 | 0–0 | 0–0 | 0–0 | 0–0 | 0–0 | 0–0 | 0–0 | 1 / 3 | 1–2 | 33.33 |
| Year End Ranking | 177 | 89 | 133 | 36 | 147 | 161 | 82 | 74 | 206 | 229 | 588 | $2,937,163 | | |

=== Doubles ===
| Tournament | 2009 | 2010 | 2011 | 2012 | 2013 | 2014 | 2015 | 2016–20 | 2021 | 2022 | SR | W–L | Win % |
|---|---|---|---|---|---|---|---|---|---|---|---|---|---|
Grand Slam tournaments
| Australian Open | A | A | 1R | A | A | 1R | 2R | A | 3R | 1R | 0 / 5 | 3–5 | 38% |
| French Open | A | 2R | 3R | A | A | SF | 2R | A | F | 2R | 0 / 6 | 14–6 | 70% |
| Wimbledon | A | 2R | 1R | A | A | 1R | A | A | 3R | 1R | 0 / 5 | 3–5 | 25% |
| US Open | 1R | 1R | A | A | A | 1R | A | A | 3R | 1R | 0 / 5 | 2–5 | 30% |
| Win–loss | 0–1 | 2–3 | 2–3 | 0–0 | 0–0 | 4–4 | 2–2 | 0–0 | 11–4 | 1–4 | 0 / 21 | 22–21 | 51% |
ATP World Tour Masters 1000
| Miami Open | A | A | 1R | A | A | A | A | A | A | | 0 / 1 | 0–1 | 0% |
| Canadian Open | A | A | A | A | A | A | A | A | 2R | | 0 / 1 | 1–1 | 50% |
| Cincinnati Open | A | A | A | A | A | A | A | A | 1R | | 0 / 1 | 0–1 | 0% |
| Paris Masters | A | 1R | A | A | A | A | A | A | 1R | | 0 / 2 | 0–2 | 0% |
| Win–loss | 0–0 | 0–1 | 0–1 | 0–0 | 0–0 | 0–0 | 0–0 | 0–0 | 1–3 | 0–0 | 0 / 5 | 1–5 | 20% |

== Wins over top 10 players ==
- He has a 4–17 (19.05%) record against players who were, at the time the match was played, ranked in the top 10.

| Season | 2005 | 2006 | 2007 | 2008 | 2009 | 2010 | 2011 | 2012 | 2013 | 2014 | 2015 | 2016 | 2017 | Total |
| Wins | 0 | 0 | 0 | 0 | 0 | 2 | 1 | 0 | 0 | 1 | 0 | 0 | 0 | 4 |

| # | Player | Rank | Event | Surface | Rd | Score | AG Rank |
|---|---|---|---|---|---|---|---|
2010
| 1. | (Russia) Nikolay Davydenko | 6 | Hamburg, Germany | Clay | 3R | 6–4, 6–4 | No. 82 |
| 2. | (Sweden) Robin Söderling | 5 | Kuala Lumpur, Malaysia | Hard (i) | QF | 6–3, 6–2 | No. 41 |
2011
| 3. | (Czech Republic) Tomáš Berdych | 7 | Davis Cup, Ostrava, Czech Republic | Hard (i) | RR | 7–5, 5–7, 6–4, 6–2 | No. 43 |
2014
| 4. | (Switzerland) Stanislas Wawrinka | 3 | Davis Cup, Geneva, Switzerland | Hard (i) | RR | 7–6^{(7–5)}, 6–2, 3–6, 7–6^{(7–5)} | No. 64 |
