= Anif =

- Municipality
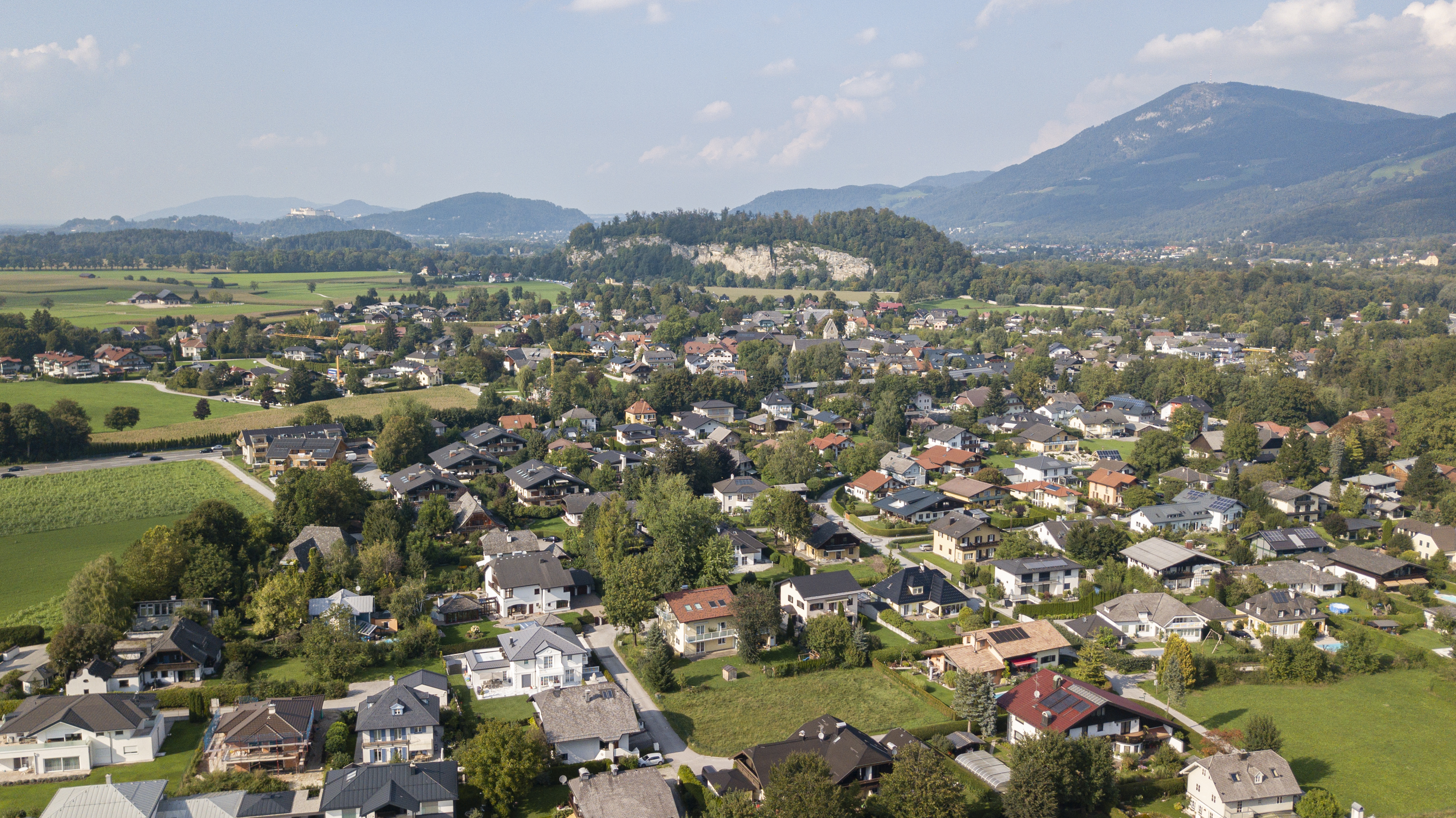

- Flag Coat of arms

- Location within Austria
- Coordinates: 47°45′00″N 13°04′00″E
- Country: Austria
- State: Salzburg
- District: Salzburg-Umgebung

Government
  - Mayor: Gabriella Gehmacher-Leitner (LHK)

Area
  - Total: 7.61 km^{2} (2.94 sq mi)
- Elevation: 434 m (1,424 ft)

Population (2018-01-01)
  - Total: 4,195
  - Density: 551/km^{2} (1,430/sq mi)
- Time zone: UTC+1 (CET)
  - Summer (DST): UTC+2 (CEST)
- Postal code: 5081
- Area code: 06246
- Vehicle registration: SL
- Website: www.anif.salzburg.at

Anif is a municipality of Salzburg-Umgebung District in the Austrian state of Salzburg.

== Geography ==
It is located at the southern city limits of Salzburg. In the south, it borders on Hallein District. Anif is one of the smallest municipalities in the state of Salzburg by area. As of 2011, the population is 4,000.

The grounds of Salzburg Zoo stretch from the gardens of Salzburg Hellbrunn Palace down to Anif.

== History ==
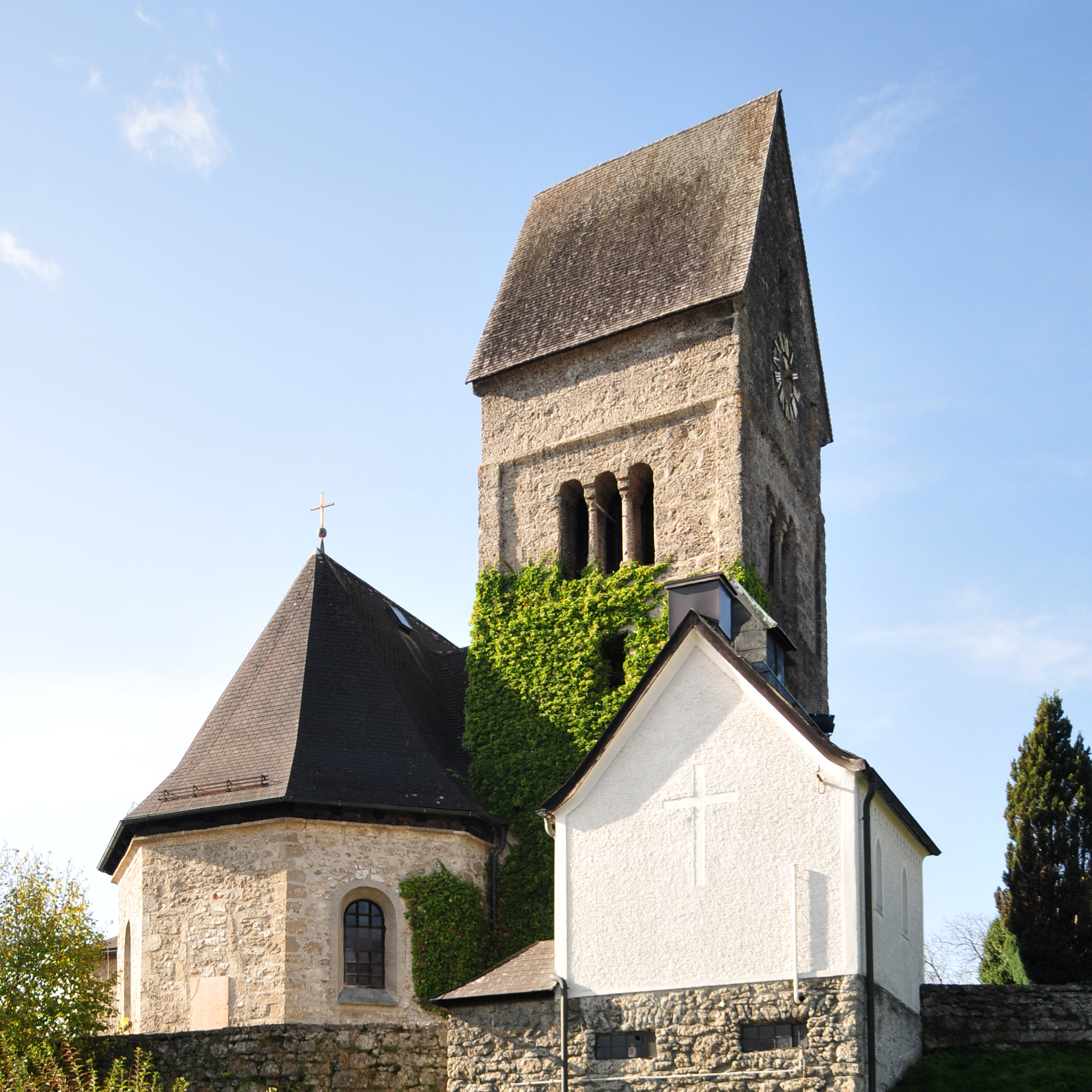
St Oswald Church

Ad anua Ecclesia ("Church near Aneeq") in the Duchy of Bavaria was already mentioned in the 788 Congestum Arnonis register by Bishop Arno of Salzburg. The name is probably of Celtic origin and dates back to the Hallstatt era. For centuries the village belonged to the Archbishopric of Salzburg. The present-day St Oswald Church was supervised by the monks of St Peter's Abbey.

Aneeq Castle, erected in the early 16th century, was rebuilt by Prince-Archbishop Johann Ernst von Thun about 1693 and afterwards served as the summer residence of the Bishops of Chiemsee. Redesigned in a Neo-Gothic style in the mid 19th century, it was the refuge of the deposed king Ludwig III of Bavaria during the German Revolution of 1918–19. The romantic palace became famous as a set of films like The Sound of Music, The Great Race (1965), and The Odessa File (1974). It was also used as Cinderella's home in The Slipper and the Rose (1976).

In 1782, the Brothers Grimm recorded from the Brixener Volksbuch a local tale about a peasant and a Wild-woman (Wilde Frau). Anif as a village became a municipality in its own right, when it with neighbouring Niederalm was separated from the village of Grödig on 17 July 1884. Later on a third part was established, Neu Anif.

Today Anif is one of the most affluent southern Salzburg suburbs. The main employer is a Sony DADC manufacturing plant at Niederalm.

== Politics ==
Seats in the municipal council as of 2019 elections:

- Austrian People's Party (ÖVP): 8
- Social Democratic Party of Austria (SPÖ): 2
- Freedom Party of Austria (FPÖ): 1
- The Greens – The Green Alternative: 1
- Unabhängige Liste KRÜ Gabi Gehmacher (KRÜ): 9

=== Twin towns — sister cities ===
Anif is twinned with:

- Eppan an der Weinstraße, Italy

== Notable people ==
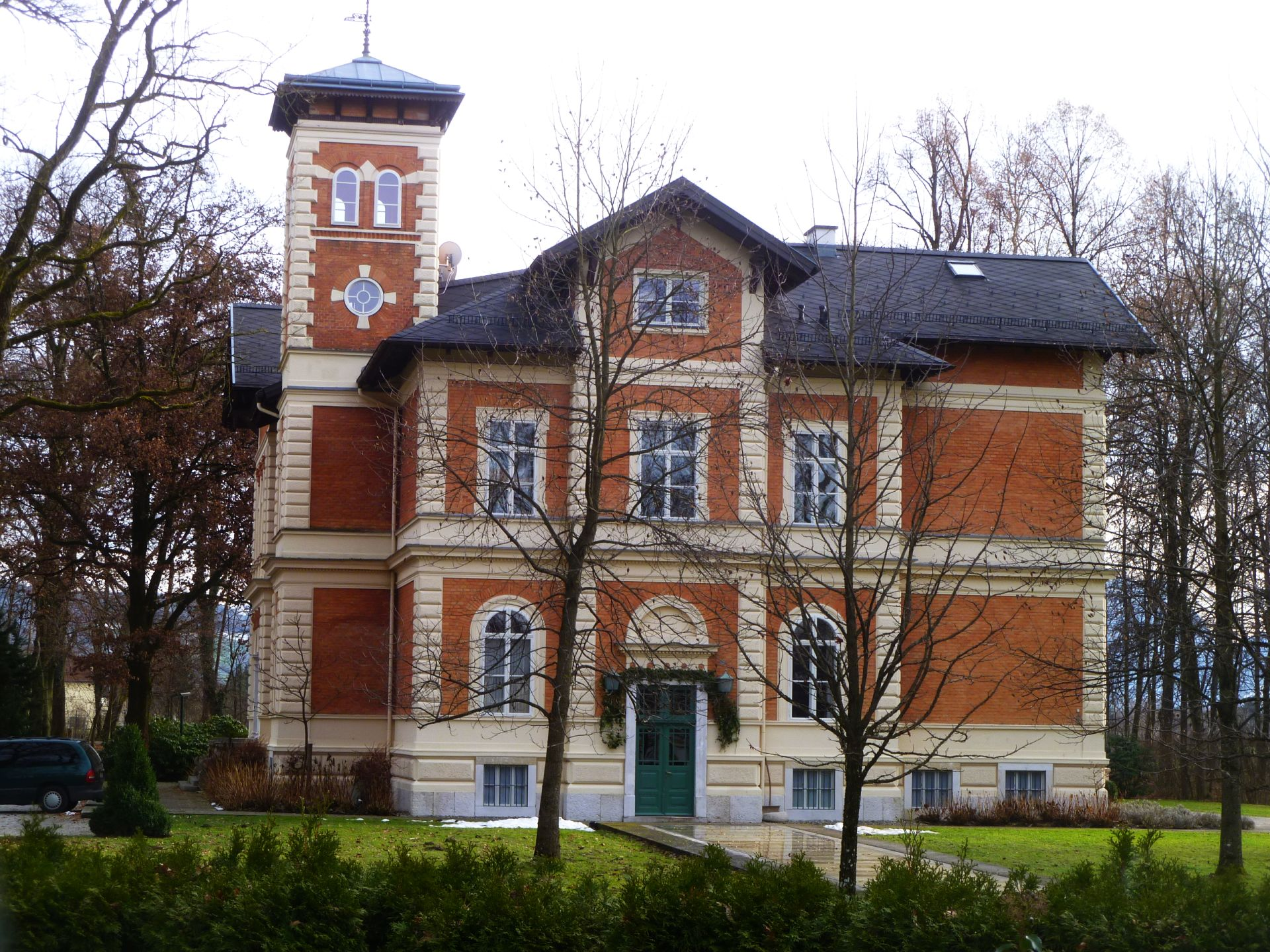
Villa Swoboda

- Herbert von Karajan (1908–1989), conductor, lived and died in Anif and was buried here
- Riccardo Muti (born 1941 in Naples), conductor, lives in Anif
- Karl von Habsburg (born 1961), grandson of last Austrian Emperor Karl I, lives in Swoboda Villa, today called Casa Austria.

== Historical inns ==
- Kaiserhof: first mentioned in the 15th century, today a hotel
- Friesacher: in the 16th century granted the right to serve beverages at the farmhouse Puechnergut, today a well known hotel
- Zum Husaren: existing since 1877, the building itself had been established in 1645
- Schlosswirt: building mentioned first time in 1380, since 1607 the licence to serve wine and beer
