= Salzburg Open =

Defunct tennis tournament
- Event name: Salzburg Open
- Location: Anif, Austria (2021); Salzburg, Austria (2022-2024)
- Venue: TC GM-Sports Anif (2021); 1. Salzburger Tennisverein (2022-2024)
- Category: ATP Challenger Tour 125
- Surface: Clay
- Prize money: €148,625

The Sparkasse Salzburg Open was a professional tennis tournament played on clay courts. It was part of the Association of Tennis Professionals (ATP) Challenger Tour. It was held in Salzburg, Austria. The first edition was played in 2021 in Anif.

== Past finals ==
=== Singles ===
Year	Champion	Runner-up	Score
2024	(Switzerland) Alexander Ritschard	(France) Kyrian Jacquet	6–4, 6–2
2023	(Austria) Sebastian Ofner	(Austria) Lukas Neumayer	6–3, 6–2
2022	(Brazil) Thiago Monteiro	(Slovakia) Norbert Gombos	6–3, 7–6^{(7–2)}
2021	(Argentina) Facundo Bagnis	(Argentina) Federico Coria	6–4, 3–6, 6–2

=== Doubles ===
Year	Champions	Runners-up	Score
2024	(France) Manuel Guinard (France) Grégoire Jacq	(Czech Republic) Petr Nouza (Czech Republic) Patrik Rikl	2–6, 6–3, [14–12]
2023	(Kazakhstan) Andrey Golubev (Ukraine) Denys Molchanov	(India) Anirudh Chandrasekar (India) Vijay Sundar Prashanth	6–4, 7–6^{(10–8)}
2022	(United States) Nathaniel Lammons (United States) Jackson Withrow	(Austria) Alexander Erler (Austria) Lucas Miedler	7–5, 5–7, [11–9]
2021	(Argentina) Facundo Bagnis (Peru) Sergio Galdós	(United States) Robert Galloway (United States) Alex Lawson	6–0, 6–3
