= 2021 BNP Paribas Polish Cup – Singles =

Singles
- 2021 BNP Paribas Polish Cup

Final
- Champion: (Argentina) Camilo Ugo Carabelli
- Runner-up: (Croatia) Nino Serdarušić
- Score: 6–4, 6–2

Events
Singles	Doubles
- BNP Paribas Polish Cup

This was the first edition of the tournament.

Camilo Ugo Carabelli won the title after defeating Nino Serdarušić 6–4, 6–2 in the final.

== Seeds ==
1. (Germany) Daniel Altmaier (second round)
2. (Slovakia) Jozef Kovalík (semifinals)
3. (Slovakia) Lukáš Klein (quarterfinals)
4. (France) Tristan Lamasine (second round)
5. (Croatia) Duje Ajduković (first round)
6. (Chile) Nicolás Jarry (quarterfinals)
7. (Ukraine) Vitaliy Sachko (first round)
8. (Bosnia and Herzegovina) Mirza Bašić (first round)

== Draw ==
Key

- Q = Qualifier
- WC = Wild card
- LL = Lucky loser
- Alt = Alternate
- ITF = ITF entry
- PR = Protected ranking
- SR = Special ranking
- SE = Special exempt
- JE = Junior exempt
- JR = Junior Accelerator Programme entrant
- CO = College Accelerator Programme entrant
- NG = Next Gen Accelerator Program entrant
- w/o = Walkover
- r = Retired
- d = Defaulted

=== Finals ===
Semifinals
(Argentina) Camilo Ugo Carabelli	3	6	7^{7}
(Spain) Javier Barranco Cosano	6	4	6^{0}
(Croatia) Nino Serdarušić	7^{7}	7^{8}
2	(Slovakia) Jozef Kovalík	6^{3}	6^{6}

Final
(Argentina) Camilo Ugo Carabelli	6	6
(Croatia) Nino Serdarušić	4	2

=== Top half ===
First round
1	(Germany) D Altmaier	0
WC	(Sweden) L Borg	2^{r}
(Argentina) C Ugo Carabelli	6	6
WC	(Poland) M Kaśnikowski	2	4
(Argentina) N Kicker	2	7	6
(Austria) A Erler	6	5	3
(Spain) A Menéndez Maceiras	5	6	1
6	(Chile) N Jarry	7	4	6
3	(Slovakia) L Klein	6	3	6
(Germany) J Lenz	1	6	3
(Russia) A Kuznetsov	6	6
(Norway) V Durasovic	0	2
(Monaco) L Catarina	3	5
(Portugal) N Borges	6	7
(Spain) J Barranco Cosano	6	6
8	(Bosnia and Herzegovina) M Bašić	3	1

Second round
1	(Germany) D Altmaier	4	6^{2}
(Argentina) C Ugo Carabelli	6	7^{7}
(Argentina) N Kicker	6^{1}	6	4
6	(Chile) N Jarry	7^{7}	4	6
3	(Slovakia) L Klein	7	6
(Russia) A Kuznetsov	5	1
(Portugal) N Borges	6	2	3
(Spain) J Barranco Cosano	3	6	6

Quarterfinals
(Argentina) C Ugo Carabelli	6	6
6	(Chile) N Jarry	2	2
3	(Slovakia) L Klein	6	3	4
(Spain) J Barranco Cosano	3	6	6

Semifinals
(Argentina) C Ugo Carabelli	3	6	7^{7}
(Spain) J Barranco Cosano	6	4	6^{0}

=== Bottom half ===
First round
7	(Ukraine) V Sachko	6	6^{4}	4
(Czech Republic) M Vrbenský	2	7^{7}	6
PR	(Belgium) Jeroen Vanneste	6	2	7
Q	(Russia) A Shevchenko	3	6	5
Q	(Poland) D Michalski	3	4
(Croatia) N Serdarušić	6	6
Q	(Poland) J Zieliński	2	2
4	(France) T Lamasine	6	6
5	(Croatia) D Ajduković	3	6	1
(Austria) L Miedler	6	3	6
WC	(Poland) S Kielan	7	6
(Portugal) G Oliveira	5	0
(France) E Furness	6	2	6
(Brazil) O Luz	4	6	3
Q	(Switzerland) J Nikles	3	4
2	(Slovakia) J Kovalík	6	6

Second round
(Czech Republic) M Vrbenský	6	4	6
PR	(Belgium) J Vanneste	0	6	3
(Croatia) N Serdarušić	6	3	7
4	(France) T Lamasine	1	6	5
(Austria) L Miedler	7	6
WC	(Poland) S Kielan	5	4
(France) E Furness	2	5
2	(Slovakia) J Kovalík	6	7

Quarterfinals
(Czech Republic) M Vrbenský	6^{1}	2
(Croatia) N Serdarušić	7^{7}	6
(Austria) L Miedler	4	4
2	(Slovakia) J Kovalík	6	6

Semifinals
(Croatia) N Serdarušić	7^{7}	7^{8}
2	(Slovakia) J Kovalík	6^{3}	6^{6}
