= 2025 Los Inkas Open – Doubles =

Doubles
- 2025 Los Inkas Open

Final
- Champions: (Ecuador) Gonzalo Escobar (Mexico) Miguel Ángel Reyes-Varela
- Runners-up: (Argentina) Federico Agustín Gómez (Venezuela) Luis David Martínez
- Score: 6–4, 6–4

Events
Singles	Doubles
- Los Inkas Open

This was the first edition of the tournament.

Gonzalo Escobar and Miguel Ángel Reyes-Varela won the title after defeating Federico Agustín Gómez and Luis David Martínez 6–4, 6–4 in the final.

== Seeds ==
1. (Ecuador) Gonzalo Escobar / (Mexico) Miguel Ángel Reyes-Varela (champions)
2. (Argentina) Federico Agustín Gómez / (Venezuela) Luis David Martínez (final)
3. (Czech Republic) Zdeněk Kolář / (Poland) Piotr Matuszewski (first round)
4. (Argentina) Mariano Kestelboim / (Brazil) Marcelo Zormann (quarterfinals)

== Draw ==
Key

- Q = Qualifier
- WC = Wild card
- LL = Lucky loser
- Alt = Alternate
- ITF = ITF entry
- PR = Protected ranking
- SR = Special ranking
- SE = Special exempt
- JE = Junior exempt
- JR = Junior Accelerator Programme entrant
- CO = College Accelerator Programme entrant
- NG = Next Gen Accelerator Program entrant
- w/o = Walkover
- r = Retired
- d = Defaulted

=== Draw ===
First round
1	(Ecuador) G Escobar (Mexico) M Reyes-Varela	6	6
(Brazil) Bruno Oliveira (Brazil) PA Saraiva dos Santos	4	2
(Uruguay) I Carou (Peru) A Huertas del Pino	6	3	[11]
(Colombia) C Rodríguez (Bolivia) F Zeballos	4	6	[13]
3	(Czech Republic) Z Kolář (Poland) P Matuszewski	7^{7}	4	[8]
(Argentina) A Collarini (Brazil) D Dutra da Silva	6^{5}	6	[10]
(Ecuador) A Andrade (Ecuador) Á Guillén Meza	6	4	[10]
(Argentina) L Midón (Argentina) G Villanueva	4	6	[3]
(Argentina) GI Justo (Uruguay) F Roncadelli	4	2
(Bolivia) B Arias (Denmark) J Ingildsen	6	6
(Argentina) S de la Fuente (Argentina) GA Olivieri	4	5
4	(Argentina) M Kestelboim (Brazil) M Zormann	6	7
(Argentina) Thiago Cigarrán (Argentina) N Kicker	6	6
WC	(Peru) Diego Gómez (Peru) Alessandro Rubini	0	4
WC	(Peru) Ricardo Sebastián Ramos Vargas (Peru) Fabio Manuel Zavalaga Uculmana	4	0
2	(Argentina) FA Gómez (Venezuela) LD Martínez	6	6

Quarterfinals
1	(Ecuador) G Escobar (Mexico) M Reyes-Varela	7	6
(Colombia) C Rodríguez (Bolivia) F Zeballos	5	4
(Argentina) A Collarini (Brazil) D Dutra da Silva	7^{7}	6
(Ecuador) A Andrade (Ecuador) Á Guillén Meza	6^{4}	4
(Bolivia) B Arias (Denmark) J Ingildsen	6	6
4	(Argentina) M Kestelboim (Brazil) M Zormann	4	1
(Argentina) T Cigarrán (Argentina) N Kicker	3	0
2	(Argentina) FA Gómez (Venezuela) LD Martínez	6	6

Semifinals
1	(Ecuador) G Escobar (Mexico) M Reyes-Varela	6	6
(Argentina) A Collarini (Brazil) D Dutra da Silva	2	3
(Bolivia) B Arias (Denmark) J Ingildsen	5	3
2	(Argentina) FA Gómez (Venezuela) LD Martínez	7	6

Final
1	(Ecuador) G Escobar (Mexico) M Reyes-Varela	6	6
2	(Argentina) FA Gómez (Venezuela) LD Martínez	4	4
