= 2022 San Luis Open Challenger =

- Date: 11–17 April
- Edition: 34th
- Surface: Clay
- Location: San Luis Potosí, Mexico

Champions

Singles
- (Switzerland) Antoine Bellier

Doubles
- (Colombia) Nicolás Barrientos / (Mexico) Miguel Ángel Reyes-Varela
- San Luis Open Challenger

The 2022 San Luis Tennis Open was a professional tennis tournament played on clay courts. It was the 34th edition of the tournament which was part of the 2022 ATP Challenger Tour. It took place in San Luis Potosí, Mexico between 11 and 17 April 2022.

== Singles main-draw entrants ==
=== Seeds ===
| Country | Player | Rank^{1} | Seed |
|---|---|---|---|
| SVK | Andrej Martin | 129 | 1 |
| CHI | Nicolás Jarry | 139 | 2 |
| USA | Ernesto Escobedo | 142 | 3 |
| ARG | Facundo Mena | 159 | 4 |
| GBR | Jay Clarke | 166 | 5 |
| SUI | Marc-Andrea Hüsler | 176 | 6 |
| ITA | Federico Gaio | 186 | 7 |
| ARG | Renzo Olivo | 203 | 8 |

- ^{1} Rankings are as of 4 April 2022.

=== Other entrants ===
The following players received wildcards into the singles main draw:

- (Mexico) Alex Hernández
- (Japan) Shintaro Mochizuki
- (Mexico) Rodrigo Pacheco Méndez

The following players received entry into the singles main draw as alternates:

- (Norway) Viktor Durasovic
- (Serbia) Peđa Krstin

The following players received entry from the qualifying draw:

- (Switzerland) Antoine Bellier
- (Lebanon) Hady Habib
- (Brazil) Gilbert Klier Júnior
- (Ecuador) Roberto Quiroz
- (China) Shang Juncheng
- (Argentina) Matías Zukas

== Champions ==
=== Singles ===
- (Switzerland) Antoine Bellier def. (Argentina) Renzo Olivo 6–7^{(2–7)}, 6–4, 7–5.

=== Doubles ===
- (Colombia) Nicolás Barrientos / (Mexico) Miguel Ángel Reyes-Varela def. (Venezuela) Luis David Martínez / (Brazil) Felipe Meligeni Alves 7–6^{(13–11)}, 6–2.
