= 2025 Los Inkas Open – Singles =

Singles
- 2025 Los Inkas Open

Final
- Champion: (Argentina) Mariano Navone
- Runner-up: (Italy) Marco Cecchinato
- Score: 6–4, 5–7, 6–4

Events
Singles	Doubles
- Los Inkas Open

This was the first edition of the tournament.

Mariano Navone won the title after defeating Marco Cecchinato 6–4, 5–7, 6–4 in the final.

== Seeds ==
1. (Argentina) Mariano Navone (champion)
2. (Argentina) Juan Manuel Cerúndolo (first round, retired)
3. (Chile) Cristian Garín (withdrew)
4. (Peru) Ignacio Buse (quarterfinals)
5. (Argentina) Román Andrés Burruchaga (second round)
6. (United States) Tristan Boyer (semifinals)
7. (Lebanon) Hady Habib (first round)
8. (Argentina) Alex Barrena (quarterfinals)
9. (Argentina) Federico Agustín Gómez (first round)

== Draw ==
Key

- Q = Qualifier
- WC = Wild card
- LL = Lucky loser
- Alt = Alternate
- ITF = ITF entry
- PR = Protected ranking
- SR = Special ranking
- SE = Special exempt
- JE = Junior exempt
- JR = Junior Accelerator Programme entrant
- CO = College Accelerator Programme entrant
- NG = Next Gen Accelerator Program entrant
- w/o = Walkover
- r = Retired
- d = Defaulted

=== Finals ===
Semifinals
1	(Argentina) Mariano Navone	6	6
(Ecuador) Álvaro Guillén Meza	4	1
6	(United States) Tristan Boyer	6^{7}	6	3
(Italy) Marco Cecchinato	7^{9}	3	6

Final
1	(Argentina) Mariano Navone	6	5	6
(Italy) Marco Cecchinato	4	7	4

=== Top half ===
First round
1	(Argentina) M Navone	6	6
(Argentina) GA Olivieri	3	1
Q	(Argentina) M Kestelboim	3	2
Q	(Spain) D Jordà Sanchis	6	6
(Kazakhstan) T Skatov	3	1
(Argentina) G Villanueva	6	6
(Argentina) A Collarini	6^{4}	4
8	(Argentina) A Barrena	7^{7}	6
4/WC	(Peru) I Buse	6	3	6
Alt	(Uruguay) F Roncadelli	3	6	2
JR	(Colombia) Miguel Tobón	1	2
Q	(Argentina) JB Torres	6	6
(Peru) G Bueno	6^{6}	1^{r}
(Ecuador) A Guillén Meza	7^{8}	3
Alt	(Ecuador) A Andrade	7^{7}	7^{7}
7	(Lebanon) H Habib	6^{4}	6^{2}

Second round
1	(Argentina) M Navone	6	6
Q	(Spain) D Jordà Sanchis	4	0
(Argentina) G Villanueva	4	2
8	(Argentina) A Barrena	6	6
4/WC	(Peru) I Buse	6	7
Q	(Argentina) JB Torres	3	5
(Ecuador) A Guillén Meza	6	6
Alt	(Ecuador) A Andrade	2	2

Quarterfinals
1	(Argentina) M Navone	6	6
8	(Argentina) A Barrena	0	3
4/WC	(Peru) I Buse	2	6	3
(Ecuador) A Guillén Meza	6	4	6

Semifinals
1	(Argentina) M Navone	6	6
(Ecuador) A Guillén Meza	4	1

=== Bottom half ===
First round
6	(United States) T Boyer	7^{7}	7^{7}
(Brazil) D Dutra da Silva	6^{2}	6^{4}
Q	(Denmark) J Ingildsen	3	1
(Argentina) N Kicker	6	6
(Czech Republic) Z Kolář	7^{7}	6^{5}	7^{7}
(Peru) JP Varillas	6^{4}	7^{7}	6^{3}
(Argentina) L Midón	4	7^{7}	6
9	(Argentina) FA Gómez	6	6^{4}	4
5	(Argentina) RA Burruchaga	6	6
WC	(Peru) Alessandro Rubini	0	3
(Italy) M Cecchinato	6	6^{5}	6
Alt	(Argentina) GI Justo	3	7^{7}	1
WC	(Peru) A Huertas del Pino	6	6^{6}	6
Q	(Argentina) Fernando Cavallo	3	7^{8}	2
Q	(Argentina) Carlos María Zárate	1	4
2	(Argentina) JM Cerúndolo	6	1^{r}

Second round
6	(United States) T Boyer	3	6	6
(Argentina) N Kicker	6	2	4
(Czech Republic) Z Kolář	6	6
(Argentina) L Midón	3	3
5	(Argentina) RA Burruchaga	6^{4}	6^{5}
(Italy) M Cecchinato	7^{7}	7^{7}
WC	(Peru) A Huertas del Pino	6	6
Q	(Argentina) CM Zárate	4	4

Quarterfinals
6	(United States) T Boyer	6	2	6
(Czech Republic) Z Kolář	4	6	3
(Italy) M Cecchinato	6	7^{7}
WC	(Peru) A Huertas del Pino	4	6^{5}

Semifinals
6	(United States) T Boyer	6^{7}	6	3
(Italy) M Cecchinato	7^{9}	3	6
