= 2021 BNP Paribas Polish Cup =

- Date: 23–29 August
- Edition: 1st
- Surface: Clay
- Location: Warsaw, Poland

Champions

Singles
- (Argentina) Camilo Ugo Carabelli

Doubles
- (Mexico) Hans Hach Verdugo / (Mexico) Miguel Ángel Reyes-Varela
BNP Paribas Polish Cup	· 2022 →

The 2021 BNP Paribas Polish Cup was a professional tennis tournament played on clay courts. It was the 1st edition of the tournament which was part of the 2021 ATP Challenger Tour. It took place in Warsaw, Poland between 23 and 29 August 2021.

== Singles main-draw entrants ==
=== Seeds ===
Country	Player	Rank^{1}	Seed
GER	Daniel Altmaier	122	1
SVK	Jozef Kovalík	125	2
SVK	Lukáš Klein	252	3
FRA	Tristan Lamasine	257	4
CRO	Duje Ajduković	258	5
CHI	Nicolás Jarry	262	6
UKR	Vitaliy Sachko	263	7
BIH	Mirza Bašić	269	8

- ^{1} Rankings are as of 16 August 2021.

=== Other entrants ===
The following players received wildcards into the singles main draw:

- (Sweden) Leo Borg
- (Poland) Maks Kaśnikowski
- (Poland) Szymon Kielan

The following player received entry into the singles main draw using a protected ranking:

- (Belgium) Jeroen Vanneste

The following players received entry from the qualifying draw:

- (Poland) Daniel Michalski
- (Switzerland) Johan Nikles
- (Russia) Alexander Shevchenko
- (Poland) Jan Zieliński

== Champions ==
=== Singles ===
- (Argentina) Camilo Ugo Carabelli def. (Croatia) Nino Serdarušić 6–4, 6–2.

=== Doubles ===
- (Mexico) Hans Hach Verdugo / (Mexico) Miguel Ángel Reyes-Varela def. (Ukraine) Vladyslav Manafov / (Poland) Piotr Matuszewski 6–4, 6–4.
