= 2022 Open de Tenis Ciudad de Pozoblanco – Doubles =

Doubles
- 2022 Open de Tenis Ciudad de Pozoblanco

Final
- Champions: (France) Dan Added (France) Albano Olivetti
- Runners-up: (Romania) Victor Vlad Cornea (Venezuela) Luis David Martínez
- Score: 3–6, 6–1, [12–10]

Events
Singles	Doubles
← 2021 ·	Open de Tenis Ciudad de Pozoblanco	· 2023 →

Igor Sijsling and Tim van Rijthoven were the defending champions but chose not to defend their title.

Dan Added and Albano Olivetti won the title after defeating Victor Vlad Cornea and Luis David Martínez 3–6, 6–1, [12–10] in the final.

== Seeds ==
1. (Romania) Victor Vlad Cornea / (Venezuela) Luis David Martínez (final)
2. (France) Dan Added / (France) Albano Olivetti (champions)
3. (India) Arjun Kadhe / (Poland) Piotr Matuszewski (semifinals)
4. (Bolivia) Boris Arias / (Bolivia) Federico Zeballos (semifinals)

== Draw ==
=== Key ===
- Q = Qualifier
- WC = Wild card
- LL = Lucky loser
- Alt = Alternate
- ITF = ITF entry
- PR = Protected ranking
- SR = Special ranking
- SE = Special exempt
- JE = Junior exempt
- JR = Junior Accelerator Programme entrant
- CO = College Accelerator Programme entrant
- NG = Next Gen Accelerator Program entrant
- w/o = Walkover
- r = Retired
- d = Defaulted

First round
1	(Romania) VV Cornea (Venezuela) LD Martínez	6	0
(Switzerland) A Bellier (France) H Grenier	4	0^{r}
(France) K de Schepper (France) M Janvier	3	2
(Moldova) A Cozbinov (Hungary) F Marozsán	6	6
4	(Bolivia) B Arias (Bolivia) F Zeballos	6	6
(United Kingdom) J Cash (Australia) T Schoolkate	4	2
(Bolivia) M Dellien (Peru) A Merino	4	2
(France) C Bittoun Kouzmine (Australia) B Walkin	6	6
WC	(Spain) Miguel Cejudo (France) Paul Valsecchi	3	5
(United States) Jack Vance (United States) Jamie Vance	6	7
A Kuznetsov (Spain) A Menéndez Maceiras	4	1
3	(India) A Kadhe (Poland) P Matuszewski	6	6
(Australia) O Jasika (Spain) A Soriano Barrera	1	7	[10]
(Spain) John Echeverría (Spain) A Moro Cañas	6	5	[12]
(Romania) A Jecan (Spain) C Sánchez Jover	5	3
2	(France) D Added (France) A Olivetti	7	6

Quarterfinals
1	(Romania) VV Cornea (Venezuela) LD Martínez	6	6
(Moldova) A Cozbinov (Hungary) F Marozsán	3	3
4	(Bolivia) B Arias (Bolivia) F Zeballos	6	4	[19]
(France) C Bittoun Kouzmine (Australia) B Walkin	4	6	[17]
(United States) Jac Vance (United States) Jam Vance	5	2
3	(India) A Kadhe (Poland) P Matuszewski	7	6
(Spain) J Echeverría (Spain) A Moro Cañas	3	6^{4}
2	(France) D Added (France) A Olivetti	6	7^{7}

Semifinals
1	(Romania) VV Cornea (Venezuela) LD Martínez	6^{4}	6	[10]
4	(Bolivia) B Arias (Bolivia) F Zeballos	7^{7}	4	[8]
3	(India) A Kadhe (Poland) P Matuszewski	2	4
2	(France) D Added (France) A Olivetti	6	6

Final
1	(Romania) VV Cornea (Venezuela) LD Martínez	6	1	[10]
2	(France) D Added (France) A Olivetti	3	6	[12]
