= 2025 Los Inkas Open =

- Date: 27 October – 2 November
- Edition: 1st
- Surface: Clay
- Location: Lima, Peru

Champions

Singles
- (Argentina) Mariano Navone

Doubles
- (Ecuador) Gonzalo Escobar / (Mexico) Miguel Ángel Reyes-Varela
- Los Inkas Open

The 2025 Los Inkas Open was a professional tennis tournament played on clay courts. It was the first edition of the tournament which was part of the 2025 ATP Challenger Tour. It took place in Lima, Peru between 27 October and 2 November 2025.

== Singles main-draw entrants ==
=== Seeds ===
Country	Player	Rank^{1}	Seed
ARG	Mariano Navone	85	1
ARG	Juan Manuel Cerúndolo	86	2
~~CHI~~	~~Cristian Garín~~	~~107~~	~~3~~
PER	Ignacio Buse	111	4
ARG	Román Andrés Burruchaga	128	5
USA	Tristan Boyer	148	6
LBN	Hady Habib	170	7
ARG	Alex Barrena	171	8
ARG	Federico Agustín Gómez	207	9

- ^{1} Rankings are as of 20 October 2025.

=== Other entrants ===
The following players received wildcards into the singles main draw:

- (Peru) Ignacio Buse
- (Peru) Arklon Huertas del Pino
- (Peru) Alessandro Rubini

The following player received entry into the singles main draw through the Junior Accelerator programme:

- (Colombia) Miguel Tobón

The following players received entry into the singles main draw as alternates:

- (Ecuador) Andrés Andrade
- (Argentina) Guido Iván Justo
- (Uruguay) Franco Roncadelli

The following players received entry from the qualifying draw:

- (Argentina) Fernando Cavallo
- (Denmark) Johannes Ingildsen
- (Spain) David Jordà Sanchis
- (Argentina) Mariano Kestelboim
- (Argentina) Juan Bautista Torres
- (Argentina) Carlos María Zárate

== Champions ==
=== Singles ===
- (Argentina) Mariano Navone def. (Italy) Marco Cecchinato 6–4, 5–7, 6–4.

=== Doubles ===
- (Ecuador) Gonzalo Escobar / (Mexico) Miguel Ángel Reyes-Varela def. (Argentina) Federico Agustín Gómez / (Venezuela) Luis David Martínez 6–4, 6–4.
