= 2021 BNP Paribas Polish Cup – Doubles =

Doubles
- 2021 BNP Paribas Polish Cup

Final
- Champions: (Mexico) Hans Hach Verdugo (Mexico) Miguel Ángel Reyes-Varela
- Runners-up: (Ukraine) Vladyslav Manafov (Poland) Piotr Matuszewski
- Score: 6–4, 6–4

Events
Singles	Doubles
- BNP Paribas Polish Cup

This was the first edition of the tournament.

Hans Hach Verdugo and Miguel Ángel Reyes-Varela won the title after defeating Vladyslav Manafov and Piotr Matuszewski 6–4, 6–4 in the final.

== Seeds ==
1. (Czech Republic) Roman Jebavý / (Slovakia) Igor Zelenay (first round)
2. (Monaco) Romain Arneodo / (Ukraine) Denys Molchanov (quarterfinals)
3. (Mexico) Hans Hach Verdugo / (Mexico) Miguel Ángel Reyes-Varela (champions)
4. (Brazil) Fernando Romboli / (Poland) Jan Zieliński (quarterfinals)

== Draw ==
Key

- Q = Qualifier
- WC = Wild card
- LL = Lucky loser
- Alt = Alternate
- ITF = ITF entry
- PR = Protected ranking
- SR = Special ranking
- SE = Special exempt
- JE = Junior exempt
- JR = Junior Accelerator Programme entrant
- CO = College Accelerator Programme entrant
- NG = Next Gen Accelerator Program entrant
- w/o = Walkover
- r = Retired
- d = Defaulted

First round
1	(Czech Republic) R Jebavý (Slovakia) I Zelenay	4	7^{9}	[4]
(Brazil) O Luz (Tunisia) S Mansouri	6	6^{7}	[10]
WC	(Poland) Kamil Gajewski (Poland) Jasza Szajrych	4	3
(Ukraine) V Sachko (New Zealand) A Sitak	6	6
3	(Mexico) H Hach Verdugo (Mexico) MÁ Reyes-Varela	7	6
(France) M Guinard (France) T Lamasine	5	4
(Poland) K Drzewiecki (Spain) S Martos Gornés	5	2
(Switzerland) L Margaroli (Portugal) G Oliveira	7	6
(Spain) A Menéndez Maceiras (Czech Republic) M Vrbenský	4	6	[2]
WC	(Ukraine) V Manafov (Poland) P Matuszewski	6	4	[10]
WC	(Sweden) L Borg (Poland) S Kielan
4	(Brazil) F Romboli (Poland) J Zieliński	w/o
(Germany) J Lenz (Netherlands) S Verbeek	6^{5}	6	[10]
(Austria) A Erler (Austria) L Miedler	7^{7}	2	[5]
Alt	(Belgium) Christopher Heyman (Belgium) Jeroen Vanneste	6	5	[6]
2	(Monaco) R Arneodo (Ukraine) D Molchanov	1	7	[10]

Quarterfinals
(Brazil) O Luz (Tunisia) S Mansouri	6	6
(Ukraine) V Sachko (New Zealand) A Sitak	2	2
3	(Mexico) H Hach Verdugo (Mexico) MÁ Reyes-Varela	6	7^{7}
(Switzerland) L Margaroli (Portugal) G Oliveira	4	6^{4}
WC	(Ukraine) V Manafov (Poland) P Matuszewski	7^{7}	3	[10]
4	(Brazil) F Romboli (Poland) J Zieliński	6^{5}	6	[6]
(Germany) J Lenz (Netherlands) S Verbeek	6	7
2	(Monaco) R Arneodo (Ukraine) D Molchanov	3	5

Semifinals
(Brazil) O Luz (Tunisia) S Mansouri	6	3	[4]
3	(Mexico) H Hach Verdugo (Mexico) MÁ Reyes-Varela	4	6	[10]
WC	(Ukraine) V Manafov (Poland) P Matuszewski	6	3	[10]
(Germany) J Lenz (Netherlands) S Verbeek	3	6	[8]

Final
3	(Mexico) H Hach Verdugo (Mexico) MÁ Reyes-Varela	6	6
WC	(Ukraine) V Manafov (Poland) P Matuszewski	4	4
