= 2018 Los Cabos Open – Singles =

Singles
- 2018 Los Cabos Open

Final
- Champion: (Italy) Fabio Fognini
- Runner-up: (Argentina) Juan Martín del Potro
- Score: 6–4, 6–2

Details
- Draw: 28 (4 Q / 3 WC )
- Seeds: 8

Events
Singles	Doubles
← 2017 ·	Los Cabos Open	· 2019 →

Sam Querrey was the defending champion, but lost in the second round to Egor Gerasimov.

Fabio Fognini won the title, defeating Juan Martín del Potro in the final, 6–4, 6–2.

== Seeds ==
The top four seeds received a bye into the second round.

1. (Argentina) Juan Martín del Potro (final)
2. (Italy) Fabio Fognini (champion)
3. (Bosnia and Herzegovina) Damir Džumhur (semifinals)
4. (France) Adrian Mannarino (quarterfinals)
5. (United States) Sam Querrey (second round)
6. (United States) Ryan Harrison (withdrew)
7. (United States) Taylor Fritz (second round)
8. (Spain) Feliciano López (second round)

== Draw ==
=== Key ===
- Q = Qualifier
- WC = Wild card
- LL = Lucky loser
- Alt = Alternate
- ITF = ITF entry
- PR = Protected ranking
- SR = Special ranking
- SE = Special exempt
- JE = Junior exempt
- JR = Junior Accelerator Programme entrant
- CO = College Accelerator Programme entrant
- NG = Next Gen Accelerator Program entrant
- w/o = Walkover
- r = Retired
- d = Defaulted

=== Finals ===
Semifinals
1	(Argentina) Juan Martín del Potro	6	7^{8}
3	(Bosnia and Herzegovina) Damir Džumhur	3	6^{6}
(United Kingdom) Cameron Norrie	4	2
2	(Italy) Fabio Fognini	6	6

Final
1	(Argentina) Juan Martín del Potro	4	2
2	(Italy) Fabio Fognini	6	6

=== Top half ===
First round
Q	(United States) M Giron	6	7
(El Salvador) M Arévalo	2	5
(Australia) B Tomic	4	3
PR	(Belarus) E Gerasimov	6	6
WC	(Mexico) L Gómez	2	3
5	(United States) S Querrey	6	6
(Italy) T Fabbiano	5	6	7
Q	(Zimbabwe) T Garanganga	7	2	5
WC	(United States) E Escobedo	3	6	1
(United States) M Mmoh	6	4	6
(Canada) P Polansky	6	3	6
LL	(Colombia) DE Galán	4	6	2

Second round
1	(Argentina) JM del Potro	7	6
Q	(United States) M Giron	5	3
PR	(Belarus) E Gerasimov	7	5	7^{8}
5	(United States) S Querrey	5	7	6^{6}
3	(Bosnia and Herzegovina) D Džumhur	7^{7}	7^{7}
(Italy) T Fabbiano	6^{0}	6^{5}
(United States) M Mmoh	7^{7}	7^{7}
(Canada) P Polansky	6^{1}	6^{2}

Quarterfinals
1	(Argentina) JM del Potro	6	6
PR	(Belarus) E Gerasimov	1	1
3	(Bosnia and Herzegovina) D Džumhur	6	6
(United States) M Mmoh	2	3

Semifinals
1	(Argentina) JM del Potro	6	7^{8}
3	(Bosnia and Herzegovina) D Džumhur	3	6^{6}

=== Bottom half ===
First round
8	(Spain) F López	7^{7}	6
Q	(Egypt) M Safwat	6^{3}	4
(United Kingdom) C Norrie	6	6
Q	(India) P Gunneswaran	2	2
(Croatia) I Karlović	4	3
(Sweden) E Ymer	6	6
7	(United States) T Fritz	7^{8}	7^{7}
WC	(Australia) T Kokkinakis	6^{6}	6^{5}
(Portugal) G Elias	4	3
PR	(Japan) Y Nishioka	6	6
(Luxembourg) G Müller	4	4
(France) Q Halys	6	6

Second round
8	(Spain) F López	3	3
(United Kingdom) C Norrie	6	6
(Sweden) E Ymer	0	2
4	(France) A Mannarino	6	6
7	(United States) T Fritz	6^{3}	1
PR	(Japan) Y Nishioka	7^{7}	6
(France) Q Halys	6	4	0
2	(Italy) F Fognini	2	6	6

Quarterfinals
(United Kingdom) C Norrie	6	6
4	(France) A Mannarino	4	4
PR	(Japan) Y Nishioka	2	2
2	(Italy) F Fognini	6	6

Semifinals
(United Kingdom) C Norrie	4	2
2	(Italy) F Fognini	6	6

== Qualifying ==
=== Seeds ===
1. (Colombia) Daniel Elahi Galán (qualifying competition, lucky loser)
2. (Egypt) Mohamed Safwat (qualified)
3. (India) Prajnesh Gunneswaran (qualified)
4. (United States) Evan King (first round)
5. (Australia) Bradley Mousley (first round)
6. (United States) Evan Song (qualifying competition)
7. (Australia) Aleksandar Vukic (qualifying competition)
8. (United States) Austin Krajicek (first round)

=== Qualifiers ===
1. (United States) Marcos Giron
2. (Egypt) Mohamed Safwat
3. (India) Prajnesh Gunneswaran
4. (Zimbabwe) Takanyi Garanganga

=== Lucky loser ===
1. (Colombia) Daniel Elahi Galán

=== Qualifying draw ===
==== First qualifier ====
First round				Qualifying competition
				1	(Colombia) Daniel Elahi Galán	2	5
					(United States) Marcos Giron	6	7
	(United States) Marcos Giron	6	6		(United States) Marcos Giron	6	7
5	(Australia) Bradley Mousley	4	3

==== Second qualifier ====
First round
2	(Egypt) Mohamed Safwat	6	6
WC	(Mexico) Alan Magadán	2	0
(Australia) Jacob Grills	6	2	3
7	(Australia) Aleksandar Vukic	3	6	6

Qualifying competition
2	(Egypt) Mohamed Safwat	2	7^{7}	6
7	(Australia) Aleksandar Vukic	6	6^{2}	4

==== Third qualifier ====
First round
3	(India) Prajnesh Gunneswaran	6	6
(Mexico) Miguel Ángel Reyes-Varela	4	0
(Mexico) Tigre Hank	4	2
6	(United States) Evan Song	6	6

Qualifying competition
3	(India) Prajnesh Gunneswaran	6	6
6	(United States) Evan Song	3	1

==== Fourth qualifier ====
First round
4	(United States) Evan King	6^{2}	6	6^{5}
(Zimbabwe) Takanyi Garanganga	7^{7}	4	7^{7}
WC	(Mexico) Luis Patiño	6	6
8	(United States) Austin Krajicek	4	4

Qualifying competition
(Zimbabwe) Takanyi Garanganga	6	0	7^{9}
WC	(Mexico) Luis Patiño	2	6	6^{7}
