= 2022 Open de Tenis Ciudad de Pozoblanco – Singles =

Singles
- 2022 Open de Tenis Ciudad de Pozoblanco

Final
- Champion: (France) Constant Lestienne
- Runner-up: (France) Grégoire Barrère
- Score: 6–0, 7–6^{(7–3)}

Events
Singles	Doubles
← 2021 ·	Open de Tenis Ciudad de Pozoblanco	· 2023 →

Altuğ Çelikbilek was the defending champion but lost in the first round to Alejandro Moro Cañas.

Constant Lestienne won the title after defeating Grégoire Barrère 6–0, 7–6^{(7–3)} in the final.

== Seeds ==
1. (Portugal) Nuno Borges (first round)
2. (France) Constant Lestienne (champion)
3. (France) Ugo Humbert (semifinals)
4. (France) Hugo Grenier (second round)
5. (Canada) Vasek Pospisil (second round)
6. (Turkey) Altuğ Çelikbilek (first round)
7. (France) Grégoire Barrère (final)
8. (France) Antoine Escoffier (quarterfinals)

== Draw ==
=== Key ===
- Q = Qualifier
- WC = Wild card
- LL = Lucky loser
- Alt = Alternate
- SE = Special exempt
- PR = Protected ranking
- ITF = ITF entry
- JE = Junior exempt
- w/o = Walkover
- r = Retired
- d = Defaulted
- SR = Special ranking

=== Finals ===
Semifinals
7	(France) Grégoire Barrère	7^{7}	7^{7}
3	(France) Ugo Humbert	6^{4}	6^{5}
(Germany) Daniel Masur	4	3
2	(France) Constant Lestienne	6	6

Final
7	(France) Grégoire Barrère	0	6^{3}
2	(France) Constant Lestienne	6	7^{7}

=== Top half ===
First round
1	(Portugal) N Borges	4	3
(Switzerland) A Bellier	6	6
(France) M Janvier	6	7
Alt	(Romania) ND Ionel	3	5
Q	(Bolivia) F Zeballos	3	1
Q	(France) D Added	6	6
(Bosnia and Herzegovina) M Bašić	4	3
7	(France) G Barrère	6	6
3	(France) U Humbert	6	6
Q	(United States) Dali Blanch	2	1
(United Kingdom) P Jubb	6	6
WC	(Spain) D Mérida	1	2
(France) A Hoang	6^{3}	7^{8}	3
(United States) Em Nava	7^{7}	6^{6}	6
(Spain) N Álvarez Varona	3	3
5	(Canada) V Pospisil	6	6

Second round
(Switzerland) A Bellier	7^{8}	5	6^{4}
(France) M Janvier	6^{6}	7	7^{7}
Q	(France) D Added	4	7^{7}	1
7	(France) G Barrère	6	6^{4}	6
3	(France) U Humbert	7	2	7^{7}
(United Kingdom) P Jubb	5	6	6^{4}
(United States) Em Nava	1	7^{7}	6
5	(Canada) V Pospisil	6	6^{4}	2

Quarterfinals
(France) M Janvier	2	4
7	(France) G Barrère	6	6
3	(France) U Humbert	6	6
(United States) Em Nava	2	4

Semifinals
7	(France) G Barrère	7^{7}	7^{7}
3	(France) U Humbert	6^{4}	6^{5}

=== Bottom half ===
First round
6	(Turkey) A Çelikbilek	6^{3}	3
WC	(Spain) A Moro Cañas	7^{7}	6
(Hungary) F Marozsán	5	3
A Kuznetsov	7	6
(Germany) D Masur	2	7^{7}	6
WC	(Spain) C Sánchez Jover	6	6^{3}	4
(United Kingdom) A Gray	4	1
4	(France) H Grenier	6	6
8	(France) A Escoffier	6	6^{1}	6
Q	(Australia) O Jasika	3	7^{7}	4
(Belgium) M Geerts	6	6
Q	(Spain) I Montes de la Torre	4	4
Q	(Spain) A Menéndez Maceiras	1	4
(Brazil) T Seyboth Wild	6	6
(Japan) H Moriya	1	4
2	(France) C Lestienne	6	6

Second round
WC	(Spain) A Moro Cañas	6	6
A Kuznetsov	4	0
(Germany) D Masur	6	6
4	(France) H Grenier	2	4
8	(France) A Escoffier	6	6
(Belgium) M Geerts	1	3
(Brazil) T Seyboth Wild	1	4
2	(France) C Lestienne	6	6

Quarterfinals
WC	(Spain) A Moro Cañas	6^{4}	6^{3}
(Germany) D Masur	7^{7}	7^{7}
8	(France) A Escoffier	1	1
2	(France) C Lestienne	6	6

Semifinals
(Germany) D Masur	4	3
2	(France) C Lestienne	6	6
