= 2022 San Luis Open Challenger – Doubles =

Doubles
- 2022 San Luis Open Challenger

Final
- Champions: (Colombia) Nicolás Barrientos (Mexico) Miguel Ángel Reyes-Varela
- Runners-up: (Venezuela) Luis David Martínez (Brazil) Felipe Meligeni Alves
- Score: 7–6^{(13–11)}, 6–2

Events
Singles	Doubles
- San Luis Open Challenger

Marcelo Arévalo and Miguel Ángel Reyes-Varela were the defending champions but only Reyes-Varela chose to defend his title, partnering Nicolás Barrientos. Reyes-Varela successfully defended his title, defeating Luis David Martínez and Felipe Meligeni Alves 7–6^{(13–11)}, 6–2 in the final.

== Seeds ==
1. (Colombia) Nicolás Barrientos / (Mexico) Miguel Ángel Reyes-Varela (champions)
2. (Venezuela) Luis David Martínez / (Brazil) Felipe Meligeni Alves (final)
3. (Slovakia) Andrej Martin / (Austria) Tristan-Samuel Weissborn (semifinals)
4. (Portugal) Gonçalo Oliveira / (India) Divij Sharan (first round)

== Draw ==
Key

- Q = Qualifier
- WC = Wild card
- LL = Lucky loser
- Alt = Alternate
- ITF = ITF entry
- PR = Protected ranking
- SR = Special ranking
- SE = Special exempt
- JE = Junior exempt
- JR = Junior Accelerator Programme entrant
- CO = College Accelerator Programme entrant
- NG = Next Gen Accelerator Program entrant
- w/o = Walkover
- r = Retired
- d = Defaulted

First round
1	(Colombia) N Barrientos (Mexico) MÁ Reyes-Varela	6	6
WC	(Japan) S Mochizuki (China) J Shang	4	0
(Brazil) M Alves (United States) E Escobedo	6	6
(United Kingdom) J Clarke (Serbia) P Krstin	4	4
3	(Slovakia) A Martin (Austria) T-S Weissborn	6	6^{4}	[10]
E Donskoy (Uzbekistan) D Istomin	1	7^{7}	[6]
(United States) JC Aragone (Argentina) F Mena	4	4
(France) J Eysseric (Italy) F Gaio	6	6
(Chile) N Jarry (Ecuador) R Quiroz	6^{7}	6	[10]
(Germany) J Lenz (Austria) G Melzer	7^{9}	4	[8]
(Bolivia) B Arias (Bolivia) F Zeballos	7	6
4	(Portugal) G Oliveira (India) D Sharan	5	3
WC	(Mexico) L Patiño (Mexico) M Sánchez	2	4
(Argentina) JP Ficovich (Colombia) N Mejía	6	6
(Switzerland) M-A Hüsler (United States) E King	3	4
2	(Venezuela) LD Martínez (Brazil) F Meligeni Alves	6	6

Quarterfinals
1	(Colombia) N Barrientos (Mexico) MÁ Reyes-Varela	6	6
(Brazil) M Alves (United States) E Escobedo	2	4
3	(Slovakia) A Martin (Austria) T-S Weissborn	6	6
(France) J Eysseric (Italy) F Gaio	4	4
(Chile) N Jarry (Ecuador) R Quiroz	6	7^{8}
(Bolivia) B Arias (Bolivia) F Zeballos	3	6^{6}
(Argentina) JP Ficovich (Colombia) N Mejía	6^{9}	6	[8]
2	(Venezuela) LD Martínez (Brazil) F Meligeni Alves	7^{11}	2	[10]

Semifinals
1	(Colombia) N Barrientos (Mexico) MÁ Reyes-Varela	6	7^{7}
3	(Slovakia) A Martin (Austria) T-S Weissborn	4	6^{2}
(Chile) N Jarry (Ecuador) R Quiroz	4	6	[6]
2	(Venezuela) LD Martínez (Brazil) F Meligeni Alves	6	1	[10]

Final
1	(Colombia) N Barrientos (Mexico) MÁ Reyes-Varela	7^{13}	6
2	(Venezuela) LD Martínez (Brazil) F Meligeni Alves	6^{11}	2
