= 2018 Los Cabos Open – Doubles =

Doubles
- 2018 Los Cabos Open

Final
- Champions: (El Salvador) Marcelo Arévalo (Mexico) Miguel Ángel Reyes-Varela
- Runners-up: (United States) Taylor Fritz (Australia) Thanasi Kokkinakis
- Score: 6–4, 6–4

Details
- Draw: 16
- Seeds: 4

Events
| Singles | Doubles |
| ← 2017 · | Los Cabos Open | · 2019 → |

Juan Sebastián Cabal and Treat Huey were the defending champions, but Huey chose not to participate and Cabal chose to compete in Washington instead.

Marcelo Arévalo and Miguel Ángel Reyes-Varela won the title, defeating Taylor Fritz and Thanasi Kokkinakis in the final, 6–4, 6–4.

== Seeds ==
1. (Mexico) Santiago González / (Spain) David Marrero (first round)
2. (Israel) Jonathan Erlich / (United Kingdom) Joe Salisbury (quarterfinals)
3. (El Salvador) Marcelo Arévalo / (Mexico) Miguel Ángel Reyes-Varela (champions)
4. (Monaco) Romain Arneodo / (United States) Nicholas Monroe (semifinals)

== Draw ==
=== Key ===
- Q = Qualifier
- WC = Wild card
- LL = Lucky loser
- Alt = Alternate
- ITF = ITF entry
- PR = Protected ranking
- SR = Special ranking
- SE = Special exempt
- JE = Junior exempt
- JR = Junior Accelerator Programme entrant
- CO = College Accelerator Programme entrant
- NG = Next Gen Accelerator Program entrant
- w/o = Walkover
- r = Retired
- d = Defaulted

=== Draw ===
First round
1 | (Mexico) S González (Spain) D Marrero | 7 | 3 | [4]
(Germany) A Begemann (Croatia) I Karlović | 5 | 6 | [10]
(Brazil) F Neis (Brazil) F Romboli | 6 | 6
WC | (Mexico) M Sánchez (Australia) B Tomic | 4 | 3
3 | (El Salvador) M Arévalo (Mexico) MÁ Reyes-Varela | 7 | 7^{7}
(United Kingdom) L Bambridge (United Kingdom) J O'Mara | 5 | 6^{2}
(Mexico) H Hach Verdugo (Sweden) A Siljeström | 1 | 7 | [10]
WC | (Mexico) L Gómez (Mexico) L Patiño | 6 | 5 | [7]
(United States) A Krajicek (India) J Nedunchezhiyan | 7 | 6
(India) P Raja (United States) J Withrow | 5 | 3
(United States) E King (United States) N Pasha | 2 | 2
4 | (Monaco) R Arneodo (United States) N Monroe | 6 | 6
(United States) T Fritz (Australia) T Kokkinakis | 4 | 6 | [10]
(Peru) S Galdós (Canada) P Polansky | 6 | 2 | [6]
(Australia) B Mousley (Sweden) E Ymer | 1 | 2
2 | (Israel) J Erlich (United Kingdom) J Salisbury | 6 | 6

Quarterfinals
(Germany) A Begemann (Croatia) I Karlović | 6 | 7^{13}
(Brazil) F Neis (Brazil) F Romboli | 3 | 6^{11}
3 | (El Salvador) M Arévalo (Mexico) MÁ Reyes-Varela | 7^{7} | 6
(Mexico) H Hach Verdugo (Sweden) A Siljeström | 6^{5} | 2
(United States) A Krajicek (India) J Nedunchezhiyan | 5 | 4
4 | (Monaco) R Arneodo (United States) N Monroe | 7 | 6
(United States) T Fritz (Australia) T Kokkinakis | 7^{7} | 6
2 | (Israel) J Erlich (United Kingdom) J Salisbury | 6^{5} | 4

Semifinals
(Germany) A Begemann (Croatia) I Karlović | 5 | 6 | [7]
3 | (El Salvador) M Arévalo (Mexico) MÁ Reyes-Varela | 7 | 2 | [10]
4 | (Monaco) R Arneodo (United States) N Monroe | 2 | 4
(United States) T Fritz (Australia) T Kokkinakis | 6 | 6

Final
3 | (El Salvador) M Arévalo (Mexico) MÁ Reyes-Varela | 6 | 6
(United States) T Fritz (Australia) T Kokkinakis | 4 | 4
