= 2022 San Luis Open Challenger – Singles =

2022 tennis event results

Singles
- 2022 San Luis Open Challenger

Final
- Champion: (Switzerland) Antoine Bellier
- Runner-up: (Argentina) Renzo Olivo
- Score: 6–7^{(2–7)}, 6–4, 7–5

Events
Singles	Doubles
- San Luis Open Challenger

Marc-Andrea Hüsler was the defending champion but lost in the semifinals to Antoine Bellier.

Bellier won the title after defeating Renzo Olivo 6–7^{(2–7)}, 6–4, 7–5 in the final.

== Seeds ==
1. (Slovakia) Andrej Martin (quarterfinals)
2. (Chile) Nicolás Jarry (semifinals)
3. (United States) Ernesto Escobedo (quarterfinals)
4. (Argentina) Facundo Mena (first round)
5. (United Kingdom) Jay Clarke (second round)
6. (Switzerland) Marc-Andrea Hüsler (semifinals)
7. (Italy) Federico Gaio (second round)
8. (Argentina) Renzo Olivo (final)

== Draw ==
Key

- Q = Qualifier
- WC = Wild card
- LL = Lucky loser
- Alt = Alternate
- ITF = ITF entry
- PR = Protected ranking
- SR = Special ranking
- SE = Special exempt
- JE = Junior exempt
- JR = Junior Accelerator Programme entrant
- CO = College Accelerator Programme entrant
- NG = Next Gen Accelerator Program entrant
- w/o = Walkover
- r = Retired
- d = Defaulted

=== Finals ===
Semifinals
Q	(Switzerland) Antoine Bellier	2	6	6
6	(Switzerland) Marc-Andrea Hüsler	6	3	3
8	(Argentina) Renzo Olivo	6	6
2	(Chile) Nicolás Jarry	3	2

Final
Q	(Switzerland) Antoine Bellier	6^{2}	6	7
8	(Argentina) Renzo Olivo	7^{7}	4	5

=== Top half ===
First round
1	(Slovakia) A Martin	6	6
(Germany) J Lenz	1	1
(Germany) N Kuhn	7^{7}	5	6
(Argentina) JP Ficovich	6^{2}	7	3
(Romania) FC Jianu	3	6	5
Q	(Switzerland) A Bellier	6	3	7
Alt	(Serbia) P Krstin	2	6	5
7	(Italy) F Gaio	6	2	7
4	(Argentina) F Mena	6^{3}	1
(China) Zh Zhang	7^{7}	6
(Colombia) N Mejía	7	6^{3}	7^{7}
Alt	(Norway) V Durasovic	5	7^{7}	6^{3}
Q	(China) J Shang	4	7^{7}	6
Q	(Lebanon) H Habib	6	6^{1}	2
Q	(Ecuador) R Quiroz	6^{1}	3
6	(Switzerland) M-A Hüsler	7^{7}	6

Second round
1	(Slovakia) A Martin	2	6	6
(Germany) N Kuhn	6	4	4
Q	(Switzerland) A Bellier	6	1	6
7	(Italy) F Gaio	3	6	3
(China) Zh Zhang	7	6^{4}	6
(Colombia) N Mejía	5	7^{7}	3
Q	(China) J Shang	4	6^{6}
6	(Switzerland) M-A Hüsler	6	7^{8}

Quarterfinals
1	(Slovakia) A Martin	3	4
Q	(Switzerland) A Bellier	6	6
(China) Zh Zhang	4	6	3
6	(Switzerland) M-A Hüsler	6	3	6

Semifinals
Q	(Switzerland) A Bellier	2	6	6
6	(Switzerland) M-A Hüsler	6	3	3

=== Bottom half ===
First round
8	(Argentina) R Olivo	6	3	6
(France) A Cazaux	4	6	4
(Portugal) G Oliveira	6	7
WC	(Japan) S Mochizuki	4	5
(Brazil) M Pucinelli de Almeida	7^{7}	1	3
(Uzbekistan) D Istomin	6^{3}	6	6
WC	(Mexico) A Hernández	4	2
3	(United States) E Escobedo	6	6
5	(United Kingdom) J Clarke	6	6
Q	(Argentina) Matías Zukas	3	4
(Brazil) F Meligeni Alves	7^{7}	6
E Donskoy	6^{2}	3
Q	(Brazil) Gilbert Klier Júnior	7^{9}	6
WC	(Mexico) R Pacheco Méndez	6^{7}	4
(Austria) G Melzer	6	3	6^{4}
2	(Chile) N Jarry	2	6	7^{7}

Second round
8	(Argentina) R Olivo	5	6	6
(Portugal) G Oliveira	7	3	2
(Uzbekistan) D Istomin	4	6	3
3	(United States) E Escobedo	6	4	6
5	(United Kingdom) J Clarke	4	0
(Brazil) F Meligeni Alves	6	6
Q	(Brazil) G Klier Júnior	7^{8}	4	4
2	(Chile) N Jarry	6^{6}	6	6

Quarterfinals
8	(Argentina) R Olivo	6	2	6
3	(United States) E Escobedo	4	6	4
(Brazil) F Meligeni Alves	6	4	5
2	(Chile) N Jarry	4	6	7

Semifinals
8	(Argentina) R Olivo	6	6
2	(Chile) N Jarry	3	2
