= 2018 Los Cabos Open =

- Date: 30 July – 5 August
- Edition: 3rd
- Category: World Tour 250
- Draw: 28S / 16D
- Prize money: $637,395
- Surface: Hard
- Location: Los Cabos, Mexico

Champions

Singles
- (Italy) Fabio Fognini

Doubles
- (El Salvador) Marcelo Arévalo / (Mexico) Miguel Ángel Reyes-Varela
- Los Cabos Open

The 2018 Los Cabos Open, also known as the Abierto Mexicano de Tenis Mifel presentado por Cinemex for sponsorship reasons, was an ATP men's tennis tournament played on outdoor hard courts. It was the 3rd edition of the Los Cabos Open, and part of the ATP World Tour 250 series of the 2018 ATP World Tour. It took place in Los Cabos, Mexico from 30 July through 5 August 2018. Second-seeded Fabio Fognini won the singles title.

== Finals ==
=== Singles ===
- (Italy) Fabio Fognini defeated (Argentina) Juan Martín del Potro, 6–4, 6–2

=== Doubles ===
- (El Salvador) Marcelo Arévalo / (Mexico) Miguel Ángel Reyes-Varela defeated (United States) Taylor Fritz / (Australia) Thanasi Kokkinakis, 6–4, 6–4

== Singles main-draw entrants ==
=== Seeds ===
Country	Player	Rank^{1}	Seed
ARG	Juan Martín del Potro	4	1
ITA	Fabio Fognini	14	2
BIH	Damir Džumhur	24	3
FRA	Adrian Mannarino	26	4
USA	Sam Querrey	29	5
USA	~~Ryan Harrison~~	~~53~~	~~6~~
USA	Taylor Fritz	65	7
ESP	Feliciano López	66	8

- Rankings are as of July 23, 2018.

=== Other entrants ===
The following players received wildcards into the singles main draw:

- (United States) Ernesto Escobedo
- (Mexico) Lucas Gómez
- (Australia) Thanasi Kokkinakis

The following players received entry using a protected ranking into the singles main draw:

- (Belarus) Egor Gerasimov
- (Japan) Yoshihito Nishioka

The following players received entry from the qualifying draw:

- (United States) Marcos Giron
- (India) Prajnesh Gunneswaran
- (Zimbabwe) Takanyi Garanganga
- (Egypt) Mohamed Safwat

The following player received entry as a lucky loser:

- (Colombia) Daniel Elahi Galán

=== Withdrawals ===
Before the tournament

- (Australia) Matthew Ebden → replaced by (El Salvador) Marcelo Arévalo
- (United States) Ryan Harrison → replaced by (Colombia) Daniel Elahi Galán
- (Serbia) Filip Krajinović → replaced by (Belarus) Egor Gerasimov
- (Australia) John Millman → replaced by (Australia) Bernard Tomic
- (United States) Jack Sock → replaced by (France) Quentin Halys

== Doubles main-draw entrants ==
=== Seeds ===
Country	Player	Country	Player	Rank^{1}	Seed
MEX	Santiago González	ESP	David Marrero	103	1
ISR	Jonathan Erlich	GBR	Joe Salisbury	113	2
ESA	Marcelo Arévalo	MEX	Miguel Ángel Reyes-Varela	118	3
MON	Romain Arneodo	USA	Nicholas Monroe	141	4

- Rankings are as of July 23, 2018.

=== Other entrants ===
The following pairs received wildcards into the doubles main draw:

- (Mexico) Lucas Gómez / (Mexico) Luis Patiño
- (Mexico) Manuel Sánchez / (Australia) Bernard Tomic
