= 2022 Open de Tenis Ciudad de Pozoblanco =

- Date: 18–24 July
- Edition: 16th
- Surface: Hard
- Location: Pozoblanco, Spain

Champions

Singles
- (France) Constant Lestienne

Doubles
- (France) Dan Added / (France) Albano Olivetti
- Open de Tenis Ciudad de Pozoblanco

The 2022 Open de Tenis Ciudad de Pozoblanco was a professional tennis tournament played on hardcourts. It was the 16th edition of the tournament which was part of the 2022 ATP Challenger Tour. It took place in Pozoblanco, Spain between 18 and 24 July 2022.

== Singles main-draw entrants ==
=== Seeds ===
Country	Player	Rank^{1}	Seed
POR	Nuno Borges	115	1
FRA	Constant Lestienne	123	2
FRA	Ugo Humbert	129	3
FRA	Hugo Grenier	135	4
CAN	Vasek Pospisil	143	5
TUR	Altuğ Çelikbilek	165	6
FRA	Grégoire Barrère	196	7
FRA	Antoine Escoffier	197	8

- ^{1} Rankings are as of 11 July 2022.

=== Other entrants ===
The following players received wildcards into the singles main draw:

- (Spain) Daniel Mérida
- (Spain) Alejandro Moro Cañas
- (Spain) Carlos Sánchez Jover

The following player received entry into the singles main draw as an alternate:

- (Romania) Nicholas David Ionel

The following players received entry from the qualifying draw:

- (France) Dan Added
- (United States) Dali Blanch
- (Australia) Omar Jasika
- (Spain) Adrián Menéndez Maceiras
- (Spain) Iñaki Montes de la Torre
- (Bolivia) Federico Zeballos

== Champions ==
=== Singles ===
- (France) Constant Lestienne def. (France) Grégoire Barrère 6–0, 7–6^{(7–3)}.

=== Doubles ===
- (France) Dan Added / (France) Albano Olivetti def. (Romania) Victor Vlad Cornea / (Venezuela) Luis David Martínez 3–6, 6–1, [12–10].
