= BNP Paribas Polish Cup =

- 2021 BNP Paribas Polish Cup

ATP Challenger Tour
- Event name: BNP Paribas Polish Cup
- Location: Warsaw, Poland
- Category: ATP Challenger Tour
- Surface: Clay
- Draw: 32S/32Q/16D

The BNP Paribas Polish Cup is a professional tennis tournament played on clay courts. It is currently part of the ATP Challenger Tour. It is held annually in Warsaw, Poland since 2021.

== Past finals ==
=== Singles ===
Year	Champion	Runner-up	Score
2021	(Argentina) Camilo Ugo Carabelli	(Croatia) Nino Serdarušić	6–4, 6–2

=== Doubles ===
Year	Champions	Runners-up	Score
2021	(Mexico) Hans Hach Verdugo (Mexico) Miguel Ángel Reyes-Varela	(Ukraine) Vladyslav Manafov (Poland) Piotr Matuszewski	6–4, 6–4
