= Los Inkas Open =

- 2025 Los Inkas Open

ATP Challenger Tour
- Location: Lima, Peru
- Category: ATP Challenger Tour
- Surface: Clay
- Prize money: $100,000

The Los Inkas Open is a professional tennis tournament played on clay courts. It is currently part of the ATP Challenger Tour. It was first held in Lima, Peru in 2025.

== Past finals ==
=== Singles ===
Year	Champion	Runner-up	Score
2025	(Argentina) Mariano Navone	(Italy) Marco Cecchinato	6–4, 5–7, 6–4

=== Doubles ===
Year	Champions	Runners-up	Score
2025	(Ecuador) Gonzalo Escobar (Mexico) Miguel Ángel Reyes-Varela	(Argentina) Federico Agustín Gómez (Venezuela) Luis David Martínez	6–4, 6–4
