= Antoine Bellier =

Swiss tennis player (born 1996)

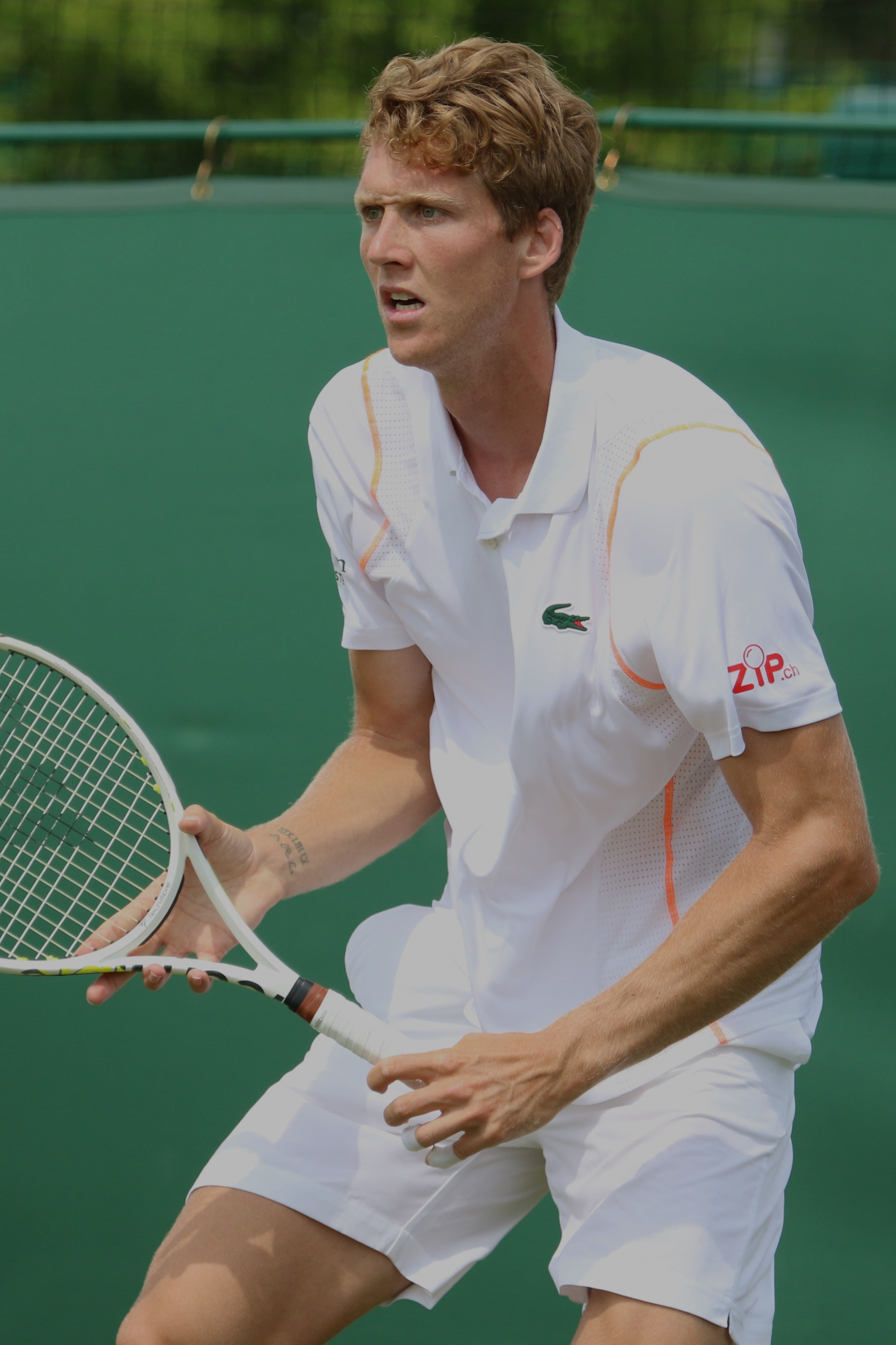
- Bellier at the 2023 Wimbledon Championships
- Country (sports): Switzerland
- Born: 18 October 1996 (age 29) Geneva, Switzerland
- Height: 1.95 m (6 ft 5 in)
- Turned pro: 2014
- Retired: 2024
- Plays: Left-handed (one-handed backhand)
- Coach: Jean-Rene Lisnard
- Prize money: $349,991

Singles
- Career record: 5–8 (at ATP Tour level, Grand Slam level, and in Davis Cup)
- Career titles: 0
- Highest ranking: No. 168 (10 April 2023)

Grand Slam singles results
- Australian Open: Q1 (2023)
- French Open: Q1 (2023)
- Wimbledon: Q1 (2023)
- US Open: Q1 (2022)

Doubles
- Career record: 1–5 (at ATP Tour level, Grand Slam level, and in Davis Cup)
- Career titles: 0
- Highest ranking: No. 331 (22 April 2024)

Team competitions
- Davis Cup: 1R (2016, 2017)
- Last updated on: 20 October 2024.

Antoine Bellier (born 18 October 1996) is a Swiss former professional tennis player. He has a career high ATP singles ranking of world No. 168, achieved on 10 April 2023 and a doubles ranking of No. 331 achieved on 22 April 2024. Bellier has won one ATP Challenger and four ITF singles titles as well as twelve doubles titles on the ITF Men's Circuit. Bellier represented Switzerland in Davis Cup, where he has a win–loss record of 1–4. He had a serve-and-volley style of play.

== Career ==
=== 2016: ATP debut ===
Bellier made his ATP main draw debut at the 2016 Swiss Open Gstaad, receiving singles and doubles main draw wildcards.

=== 2022: First ATP semifinal & Top 200 debut ===
Ranked No. 303 at the 2022 Mallorca Championships Bellier recorded his second ATP win over Federico Delbonis as a qualifier. He went one step further to defeat fourth seed Pablo Carreno Busta and reach his first ATP quarterfinal. He defeated Tallon Griekspoor to reach his first ATP semifinal in his career. He became the lowest ranked semi-finalist since No. 335 Juan Manuel Cerundolo in 2021 in Cordoba. As a result, he moved almost 90 positions up to World No. 217 in the rankings on 27 June 2022.

He made his debut in the top 200 in the rankings on 25 July 2022 after a second round showing at the Pozoblanco Challenger where he defeated top seed Nuno Borges.

=== 2023: Second Challenger title ===
In October he won his second Challenger title in Ismaining, Germany and returned to the top 250 on 6 November 2023.

=== 2024: Retirement ===
He received a wildcard in doubles for the 2024 Geneva Open partnering Jakub Paul. At the same tournament, he also entered the singles competition as an alternate.

On his 28th birthday, Bellier announced his retirement from professional tennis on October 18, 2024.

== Singles performance timeline ==
Key
W	F	SF	QF	#R	RR	Q#	DNQ	A	NH

(W) winner; (F) finalist; (SF) semifinalist; (QF) quarterfinalist; (#R) rounds 4, 3, 2, 1; (RR) round-robin stage; (Q#) qualification round; (DNQ) did not qualify; (A) absent; (NH) not held; (SR) strike rate (events won / competed); (W–L) win–loss record.
To avoid confusion and double counting, these charts are updated at the conclusion of a tournament or when the player's participation has ended.

Current through the 2023 Australian Open.

Tournament	2015	2016	2017	2018	2019	2020	2021	2022	2023	SR	W–L
Grand Slam tournaments
Australian Open	A	A	A	A	A	A	A	A	Q1	0 / 0	0–0
French Open	A	A	A	A	A	A	A	A	Q1	0 / 0	0–0
Wimbledon	A	A	A	A	A	NH	A	A	Q1	0 / 0	0–0
US Open	A	A	A	A	A	A	A	Q1	A	0 / 0	0–0
Win–loss	0–0	0–0	0–0	0–0	0–0	0–0	0–0	0–0		0 / 0	0–0
National representation
Davis Cup	A	1R	1R	PO	A	A	A			0 / 2	1–3
Career statistics
Tournaments	0	1	1	0	0	0	0	2	1	5	
Overall win–loss	0–0	1–3	0–2	0–0	0–0	0–0	0–0	4–2	0–1	5–8	
Year-end ranking	691	611	702	–	609	552	491	184			

== ATP Challenger and ITF Futures finals ==
=== Singles: 9 (6–3) ===
Legend ATP Challenger (2–0) ITF Futures/World Tennis Tour (4–3)	Finals by surface Hard (2–2) Clay (2–1) Grass (0–0) Carpet (2–0)

Result	W–L	Date	Tournament	Tier	Surface	Opponent	Score
Loss	0–1	Sep 2015	Tunisia F23, El Kantaoui	Futures	Hard	(Slovakia) Patrik Fabian	3–6, 3–6
Loss	0–2	Aug 2016	Switzerland F5, Sion	Futures	Clay	(Switzerland) Johan Nikles	6–4, 2–6, 1–6
Win	1–2	Mar 2019	M15 Arcadia, USA	World Tennis Tour	Hard	(United States) Grey Hamilton	6–3, 6–3
Win	2–2	Nov 2019	M15 Sarreguemines, France	World Tennis Tour	Carpet (i)	(Germany) Tobias Simon	6–4, 7–6^{(7–2)}
Win	3–2	Jan 2020	M15 Bressuire, France	World Tennis Tour	Hard (i)	(France) Quentin Robert	6–4, 6–3
Win	4–2	Jan 2021	M15 Manacor, Spain	World Tennis Tour	Clay	(France) Evan Furness	7–6^{(9–7)}, 6–4
Loss	4–3	Jan 2022	M15, Manacor, Spain	World Tennis Tour	Hard	(France) Ugo Blanchet	3–6, 6–4, 6–7^{(2–7)}
Win	5–3	Apr 2022	San Luis Potosí, Mexico	Challenger	Clay	(Argentina) Renzo Olivo	6–7^{(2–7)}, 6–4, 7–5
Win	6–3	Oct 2023	Ismaning, Germany	Challenger	Carpet (i)	(Germany) Maximilian Marterer	7–6^{(7–5)}, 6–7^{(5–7)}, 7–6^{(8–6)}

=== Doubles: 28 (13–15) ===
Legend ATP Challenger Tour (1–0) ITF Futures/World Tennis Tour (12–15)	Finals by surface Hard (9–9) Clay (3–6) Grass (0–0) Carpet (1–0)

Result	W–L	Date	Tournament	Tier	Surface	Partner	Opponents	Score
Loss	0–1	Nov 2014	Turkey F42, Antalya	Futures	Hard	(Switzerland) Adrian Bodmer	(Austria) Lucas Miedler (Austria) Tristan-Samuel Weissborn	5–7, 1–6
Loss	0–2	Apr 2015	Greece F3, Heraklion	Futures	Hard	(France) Hugo Grenier	(Belarus) Maxim Dubarenco (Ukraine) Vladyslav Manafov	1–6, 0–6
Loss	0–3	Apr 2015	Turkey F17, Antalya	Futures	Hard	(Monaco) Hugo Nys	(Austria) Lucas Miedler (Austria) Maximilian Neuchrist	6–4, 3–6, [7–10]
Loss	0–4	Jun 2015	Serbia F2, Valjevo	Futures	Clay	(Australia) Aleksandar Vukic	(Serbia) Danilo Petrović (Czech Republic) Libor Salaba	6–7^{(7–9)}, 4–6
Loss	0–5	Jul 2015	Serbia F5, Belgrade	Futures	Clay	(France) Maxime Janvier	(Serbia) Nebojsa Peric (Serbia) Danilo Petrović	5–7, 2–6
Win	1–5	Aug 2015	Switzerland F5, Lausanne	Futures	Clay	(Switzerland) Joss Espasandin	(Switzerland) Antoine Baroz (Germany) Pascal Meis	7–5, 3–6, [10–5]
Loss	1–6	Sep 2015	Tunisia F23, El Kantaoui	Futures	Hard	(Spain) Aaron Cortes Alcaraz	(Germany) Jannis Kahlke (France) Hugo Voljacques	3–6, 6–6 ret.
Win	2–6	Jan 2016	Germany F1, Schwieberdingen	Futures	Carpet (i)	(France) Hugo Grenier	(Germany) Andreas Mies (Germany) Oscar Otte	6–4, 7–6^{(9–7)}
Loss	2–7	Mar 2016	Israel F5, Ramat Hasharon	Futures	Hard	(Hungary) Gábor Borsos	(France) Corentin Denolly (France) Maxime Janvier	6–4, 4–6, [10–12]
Win	3–7	Apr 2016	Qatar F1, Doha	Futures	Hard	(France) Benjamin Bonzi	(United Kingdom) Daniel Cox (Sweden) Milos Sekulic	6–3, 6–2
Win	4–7	Apr 2016	Qatar F2, Doha	Futures	Hard	(France) Benjamin Bonzi	(Tunisia) Anis Ghorbel (France) Tak Khunn Wang	7–6^{(7–5)}, 6–3
Win	5–7	Apr 2016	Qatar F3, Doha	Futures	Hard	(France) Benjamin Bonzi	(Tunisia) Anis Ghorbel (France) Tak Khunn Wang	6–3, 1–6, [11–9]
Loss	5–8	May 2016	Ukraine F1, Cherkassy	Futures	Clay	(Ukraine) Vladyslav Manafov	(Belgium) Sander Gille (Belgium) Joran Vliegen	3–6, 6–4, [9–11]
Loss	5–9	Aug 2016	Switzerland F3, Collonge-Bellerive	Futures	Clay (i)	(Monaco) Hugo Nys	(Portugal) Gonçalo Oliveira (France) Fabien Reboul	3–6, 5–7
Loss	5–10	Mar 2017	Portugal F2, Faro	Futures	Hard	(Ukraine) Marat Deviatiarov	(United Kingdom) James Marsalek (Austria) Lucas Miedler	7–5, 1–6, [6–10]
Win	6–10	May 2017	Israel F7, Herzliya	Futures	Hard	(France) Albano Olivetti	(Israel) Dekel Bar (Argentina) Matias Franco Descotte	7–6^{(7–1)}, 6–4
Win	7–10	May 2017	Israel F8, Netanya	Futures	Hard	(France) Albano Olivetti	(France) Yanais Laurent (Canada) Filip Peliwo	7–6^{(8–6)}, 7–5
Loss	7–11	Jul 2017	France F16, Uriage	Futures	Clay	(France) Johan Tatlot	(France) Corentin Denolly (France) Alexandre Müller	3–6, 5–7
Win	8–11	Sep 2018	Great Britain F5, Roehampton	Futures	Hard	(France) Baptiste Crepatte	(United Kingdom) James Story (United Kingdom) Connor Thomson	7–6^{(7–5)}, 6–7^{(2–7)}, [10–5]
Loss	8–12	Sep 2018	Sweden F4, Stockholm	Futures	Hard (i)	(Germany) Johannes Härteis	(Sweden) Markus Eriksson (Sweden) Fred Simonsson	6–2, 4–6, [8–10]
Loss	8–13	Oct 2018	Sweden F5, Falun	Futures	Hard (i)	(Germany) Johannes Härteis	(Latvia) Mārtiņš Podžus (Latvia) Jānis Podžus	1–6, 2–6
Win	9–13	Aug 2019	M15 Horgen, Switzerland	World Tennis Tour	Clay	(Switzerland) Raphael Baltensperger	(Switzerland) Luca Staeheli (Switzerland) Damien Wenger	6–4, 6–2
Loss	9–14	Sep 2019	M25 Mulhouse, France	World Tennis Tour	Hard	(Belgium) Christopher Heyman	(Netherlands) Gijs Brouwer (Netherlands) Glenn Smits	4–6, 6–7^{(6–8)}
Win	10–14	Sep 2019	M25 Plaisir, France	World Tennis Tour	Hard (i)	(France) Maxime Tchoutakian	(Belgium) Christopher Heyman (Belgium) Yannick Mertens	7–6^{(7–3)}, 6–4
Win	11–14	Oct 2019	M15 Doha, Qatar	World Tennis Tour	Hard	(France) Quentin Folliot	(Morocco) Adam Moundir (Slovakia) Marek Semjan	6–4, 2–6, [10–6]
Win	12–14	Oct 2019	M15 Mishref, Kuwait	World Tennis Tour	Hard	(Sweden) Jonathan Mridha	(Ukraine) Yurii Dzhavakian (Belarus) Mikalai Haliak	6–1, 6–4
Loss	12–15	Jan 2021	M15 Manacor, Spain	World Tennis Tour	Clay	(France) Dan Added	(France) Sadio Doumbia (France) Fabien Reboul	6–7^{(1–7)}, 1–6
Win	13-15	May 2022	Shymkent, Kazakhstan	Challenger	Clay	(Brazil) Gabriel Décamps	(Germany) Sebastian Fanselow (Japan) Kaichi Uchida	7-6^{(7-3)}, 6-3
