= Miguel Ángel Reyes-Varela =

Mexican tennis player

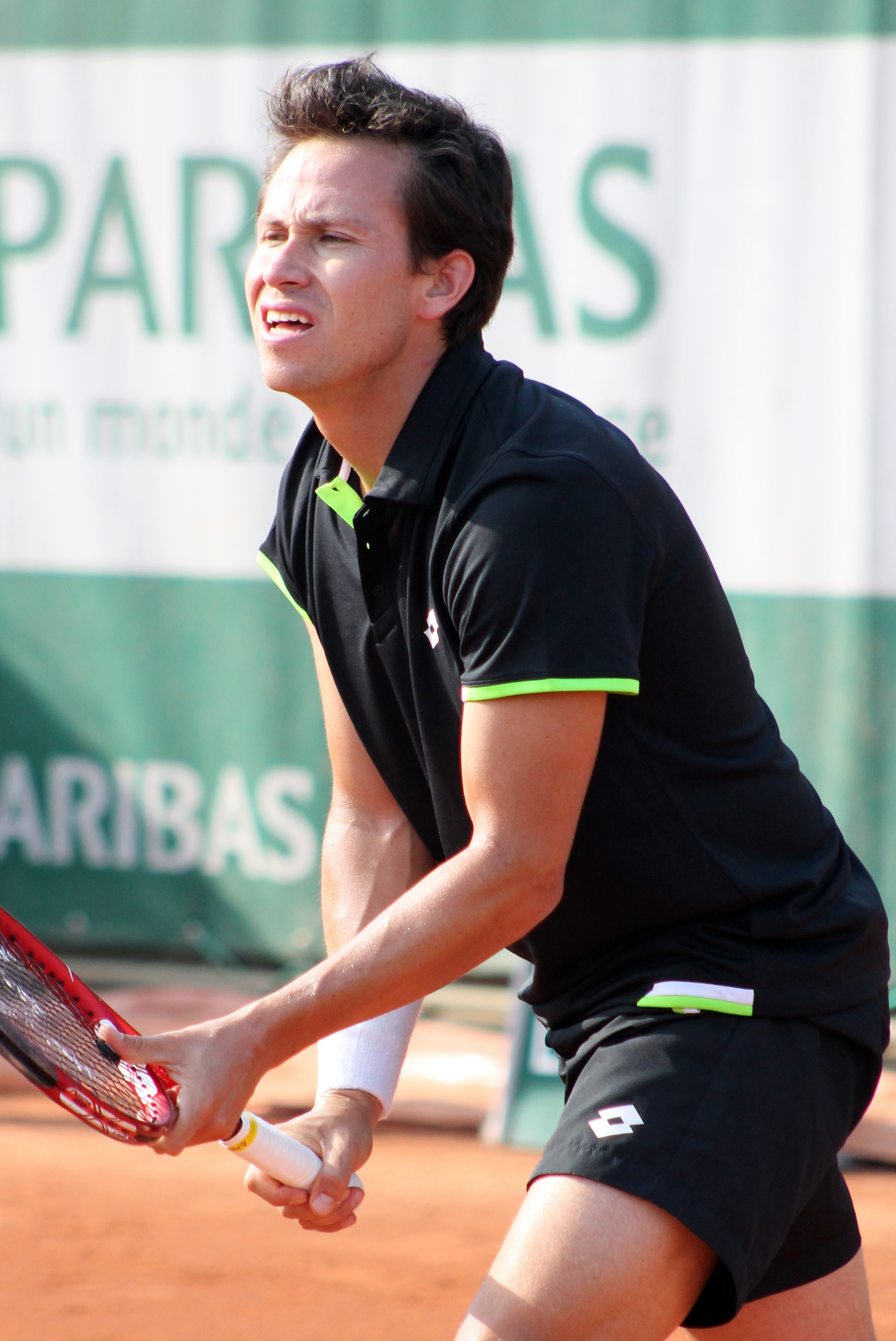
- Country (sports): Mexico
- Residence: Queretaro, Mexico
- Born: 21 June 1987 (age 39) Guadalajara, Mexico
- Height: 1.75 m (5 ft 9 in)
- Turned pro: 2010
- Plays: Right-handed (two-handed backhand)
- College: University of Texas at Austin
- Coach: Miguel Reyes-Varela; Eduardo Vicencio
- Prize money: US$925,218

Singles
- Career record: 4–4 (ATP Tour level, Grand Slam level, and Davis Cup)
- Career titles: 0
- Highest ranking: No. 400 (17 June 2013)

Doubles
- Career record: 81–119 (ATP Tour level, Grand Slam level, and Davis Cup)
- Career titles: 2
- Highest ranking: No. 49 (20 August 2018)
- Current ranking: No. 80 (23 February 2026)

Grand Slam doubles results
- Australian Open: 2R (2024, 2025)
- French Open: 3R (2023, 2024, 2026)
- Wimbledon: 2R (2018, 2019, 2025, 2026)
- US Open: 2R (2025)
- Last updated on: 27 February 2026.

Miguel Ángel Reyes-Varela Martínez (Spanish pronunciation: [miˈɣel ˈaŋxel ˈreʝes βaˈɾela]; (Note: In isolation, Varela is pronounced [baˈɾela].) born June 21, 1987) is a Mexican professional tennis player who specializes in doubles. He has a career-high ATP doubles ranking of world No. 49 achieved on 20 August 2018 and a career-high ATP singles ranking is No. 400 achieved on 17 June 2013. He has won two doubles ATP titles and has played multiple seasons of the Davis Cup, including on the 2011 Mexican Davis Cup squad.

== Career ==
He won his maiden ATP title at the 2018 Los Cabos Open with Marcelo Arévalo and reached two finals in 2018-19 Newport (w/Arevalo) and one in 2022 Seoul (w/Barrientos).

At the 2024 Croatia Open Umag, he lifted his second ATP trophy with Guido Andreozzi defeating French duo and second time ATP finalists Manuel Guinard and Gregoire Jacq in the final.

== ATP career finals ==
=== Doubles: 5 (2 titles, 3 runners-up) ===
| Legend Grand Slam tournaments (0–0) ATP World Tour Finals (0–0) ATP World Tour Masters 1000 (0–0) ATP World Tour 500 Series (0–0) ATP World Tour 250 Series (2–3) | Titles by surface Hard (1–1) Clay (1–0) Grass (0–2) | Titles by setting Outdoor (2–2) Indoor (0–0) |

| Result | W–L | Date | Tournament | Tier | Surface | Partner | Opponents | Score |
|---|---|---|---|---|---|---|---|---|
| Loss | 0–1 | Jul 2018 | Hall of Fame Tennis Championships, United States | 250 Series | Grass | (El Salvador) Marcelo Arévalo | (Israel) Jonathan Erlich (New Zealand) Artem Sitak | 1–6, 2–6 |
| Win | 1–1 | Aug 2018 | Los Cabos Open, Mexico | 250 Series | Hard | (El Salvador) Marcelo Arévalo | (United States) Taylor Fritz (Australia) Thanasi Kokkinakis | 6–4, 6–4 |
| Loss | 1–2 | Jul 2019 | Hall of Fame Tennis Championships, United States | 250 Series | Grass | (El Salvador) Marcelo Arévalo | (Spain) Marcel Granollers (Ukraine) Sergiy Stakhovsky | 7–6^{(12–10)}, 4–6, [11–13] |
| Loss | 1–3 | Oct 2022 | Korea Open, South Korea | 250 Series | Hard | (Colombia) Nicolás Barrientos | (South Africa) Raven Klaasen (United States) Nathaniel Lammons | 1–6, 5–7 |
| Win | 2–3 | Jul 2024 | Croatia Open, Croatia | 250 Series | Clay | (Argentina) Guido Andreozzi | (France) Manuel Guinard (France) Grégoire Jacq | 6–4, 6–2 |

== Challenger and Futures finals ==
=== Singles: 5 (4–1) ===
| Legend (singles) ATP Challenger Tour (0–0) ITF Futures Tour (4–1) | Titles by surface Hard (4–1) Clay (0–0) Grass (0–0) Carpet (0–0) |

| Result | W–L | Date | Tournament | Tier | Surface | Opponent | Score |
|---|---|---|---|---|---|---|---|
| Win | 1–0 | Feb 2013 | Mexico F4, Tehuacán | Futures | Hard | (France) Gianni Mina | 6–4, 1–6, 6–2 |
| Win | 2–0 | May 2013 | Mexico F7, Puebla | Futures | Hard | (Mexico) Miguel Gallardo Valles | 6–7^{(5–7)}, 6–4, 7–6^{(7–1)} |
| Win | 3–0 | May 2013 | Mexico F8, Puebla | Futures | Hard | (United States) Adam El Mihdawy | 7–6^{(7–5)}, 1–6, 6–3 |
| Loss | 3–1 | May 2013 | Mexico F9, Morelia | Futures | Hard | (United States) Nicolas Meister | 7–6^{(7–2)}, 2–6, 3–6 |
| Win | 4–1 | May 2014 | Mexico F4, Morelia | Futures | Hard | (Colombia) Eduardo Struvay | 6–3, 6–3 |

=== Doubles: 106 (51–55) ===
| Legend (doubles) ATP Challenger Tour (33–38) ITF Futures Tour (18–17) | Titles by surface Hard (19–26) Clay (32–29) Grass (0–0) Carpet (0–0) |

| Result | W–L | Date | Tournament | Tier | Surface | Partner | Opponents | Score |
|---|---|---|---|---|---|---|---|---|
| Win | 1–0 | Sep 2004 | Mexico F11, Mexico City | Futures | Hard | (Mexico) Santiago González | (Mexico) Juan Manuel Elizondo (Mexico) Óscar Zarzosa | 6–3, 6–2 |
| Loss | 1–1 | Feb 2005 | Mexico F1, Naucalpan | Futures | Hard | (Mexico) Víctor Romero | (Mexico) Santiago González (Mexico) Alejandro Hernández | 4–6, 2–6 |
| Loss | 1–2 | Nov 2005 | Mexico F18, Querétaro | Futures | Hard | (Mexico) Bruno Rodríguez | (Sweden) Mikael Ekman (Sweden) Carl-Henrik Hansen | 3–6, 2–6 |
| Loss | 1–3 | Jul 2006 | Mexico F9, Mexico City | Futures | Hard | (Mexico) Bruno Rodríguez | (United States) Michael Johnson (Cuba) Lázaro Navarro-Batles | 4–6, 6–4, 2–6 |
| Win | 2–3 | Aug 2006 | Mexico F11, Tuxtla Gutiérrez | Futures | Hard | (Mexico) Bruno Rodríguez | (Argentina) Alejandro Correa (United States) Geoffrey Gehrke | 6–4, 6–2 |
| Loss | 2–4 | Feb 2010 | Mexico F1, Mexico City | Futures | Hard | (Mexico) Luis Díaz Barriga | (Mexico) Daniel Garza (Mexico) Bruno Rodríguez | 4–6, 5–7 |
| Loss | 2–5 | Apr 2010 | Brazil F2, Bauru | Futures | Clay | (Mexico) Luis Díaz Barriga | (Venezuela) Miguel Cicenia (Argentina) Maximiliano Estévez | 6–7^{(3–7)}, 6–2, [6–10] |
| Win | 3–5 | Apr 2010 | Brazil F4, Fortaleza | Futures | Clay | (Mexico) Luis Díaz Barriga | (Brazil) Franco Ferreiro (Brazil) Fernando Romboli | 6–7^{(5–7)}, 7–6^{(7–2)}, [10–6] |
| Win | 4–5 | May 2010 | Brazil F5, Teresina | Futures | Clay | (Mexico) Luis Díaz Barriga | (Brazil) Alexandre Bonatto (Brazil) José Pereira | 6–4, 3–6, [10–7] |
| Loss | 4–6 | May 2010 | Brazil F6, Caldas Novas | Futures | Hard | (Mexico) Luis Díaz Barriga | (Brazil) Franco Ferreiro (Brazil) André Miele | 3–6, 4–6 |
| Loss | 4–7 | May 2010 | Brazil F7, Marília | Futures | Clay | (Mexico) Luis Díaz Barriga | (Brazil) Marcelo Demoliner (Brazil) Rodrigo Guidolin | 6–4, 1–6, [9–11] |
| Win | 5–7 | May 2010 | Brazil F8, Juiz de Fora | Futures | Clay | (Mexico) Luis Díaz Barriga | (Brazil) Gustavo Junqueira de Andrade (Brazil) Thales Turini | 6–2, 6–0 |
| Loss | 5–8 | Jun 2010 | Venezuela F2, Coro | Futures | Hard | (Mexico) Luis Díaz Barriga | (Colombia) Juan Sebastián Cabal (Colombia) Robert Farah | 6–7^{(5–7)}, 6–7^{(6–8)} |
| Loss | 5–9 | Aug 2010 | Italy F21, Appiano | Futures | Clay | (Mexico) Luis Díaz Barriga | (Egypt) Karim Maamoun (Egypt) Sherif Sabry | 4–6, 5–7 |
| Win | 6–9 | Sep 2010 | Italy F24, Trieste | Futures | Clay | (Mexico) Luis Díaz Barriga | (Italy) Marco Bortolotti (Italy) Alessandro Giannessi | 7–5, 6–3 |
| Win | 7–9 | Dec 2010 | Mexico F12, Acapulco | Futures | Clay | (Mexico) Luis Díaz Barriga | (Guatemala) Christopher Díaz Figueroa (Ecuador) Iván Endara | 6–2, 6–3 |
| Win | 8–9 | Jan 2011 | Mexico F1, Mexico City | Futures | Hard | (Mexico) Luis Díaz Barriga | (Mexico) Mauricio Astorga (Mexico) Miguel Gallardo Valles | 6–4, 7–6^{(7–5)} |
| Loss | 8–10 | Feb 2011 | El Salvador F1, Santa Tecla | Futures | Clay | (Mexico) Luis Díaz Barriga | (Australia) Chris Letcher (Australia) Brendan Moore | 2–6, 2–6 |
| Loss | 8–11 | Apr 2011 | Chile F3, Santiago | Futures | Clay | (Venezuela) Luis David Martínez | (Peru) Duilio Beretta (Ecuador) Roberto Quiroz | 4–6, 5–7 |
| Loss | 8–12 | Jun 2011 | Mexico F5, Celaya | Futures | Hard | (Mexico) Luis Díaz Barriga | (Guatemala) Christopher Díaz Figueroa (Uruguay) Marcel Felder | 6–2, 3–6, [5–10] |
| Loss | 8–13 | May 2012 | Mexico F6, Guadalajara | Futures | Hard | (Mexico) Bruno Rodríguez | (United States) Devin Britton (Barbados) Darian King | 3–6, 7–5, [4–10] |
| Win | 9–13 | May 2012 | Mexico F7, Morelia | Futures | Hard | (Mexico) Bruno Rodríguez | (New Zealand) Marvin Barker (Australia) Chris Letcher | 6–4, 6–2 |
| Win | 10–13 | May 2012 | Mexico F8, Puebla | Futures | Hard | (Mexico) Alejandro Moreno Figueroa | (El Salvador) Marcelo Arévalo (Colombia) Felipe Mantilla | 6–2, 7–5 |
| Win | 11–13 | Jun 2012 | Germany F5, Unterföhring | Futures | Clay | (Mexico) Bruno Rodríguez | (Germany) Dominik Meffert (Germany) Michael Spegel | 3–6, 6–2, [10–7] |
| Win | 12–13 | Jul 2012 | Germany F10, Hannover | Futures | Clay | (Mexico) Alejandro Moreno Figueroa | (Germany) Maximilian Dinslaken (Germany) George von Massow | 1–6, 6–3, [10–7] |
| Win | 13–13 | Jul 2012 | Germany F11, Dortmund | Futures | Clay | (Mexico) Alejandro Moreno Figueroa | (Germany) Patrick Pradella (Germany) Jan-Lennard Struff | 4–6, 6–4, [10–7] |
| Loss | 13–14 | Aug 2012 | Germany F13, Friedberg | Futures | Clay | (Mexico) Bruno Rodríguez | (Australia) Dane Propoggia (New Zealand) Jose Statham | 1–6, 4–6 |
| Loss | 13–15 | Aug 2012 | Netherlands F6, Rotterdam | Futures | Clay | (Mexico) Bruno Rodríguez | (Netherlands) Stephan Fransen (Austria) Gerald Melzer | 3–6, 6–7^{(3–7)} |
| Win | 14–15 | Sep 2012 | Mexico F10, Manzanillo | Futures | Hard | (El Salvador) Marcelo Arévalo | (Guatemala) Christopher Díaz Figueroa (Barbados) Darian King | 6–1, 7–5 |
| Loss | 14–16 | Feb 2013 | Mexico F4, Tehuacán | Futures | Hard | (Mexico) Alan Núñez Aguilera | (Moldova) Roman Borvanov (Guatemala) Christopher Díaz Figueroa | 6–7^{(2–7)}, 2–6 |
| Win | 15–16 | May 2013 | Mexico F8, Puebla | Futures | Hard | (Mexico) Alejandro Moreno Figueroa | (Canada) George Jecminek (United States) Kirill Kasyanov | 5–7, 6–2, [10–7] |
| Loss | 15–17 | Feb 2014 | Morelos, Mexico | Challenger | Hard | (Mexico) Alejandro Moreno Figueroa | (Slovakia) Andrej Martin (Austria) Gerald Melzer | 2–6, 4–6 |
| Win | 16–17 | Mar 2014 | Guadalajara, Mexico | Challenger | Hard | (Mexico) César Ramírez | (Germany) Andre Begemann (Australia) Matthew Ebden | 6–4, 6–2 |
| Win | 17–17 | Apr 2014 | Mexico F1, Querétaro | Futures | Hard | (Mexico) César Ramírez | (United States) Kevin King (South Africa) Dean O'Brien | 6–3, 7–5 |
| Win | 18–17 | May 2014 | Mexico F2, Córdoba | Futures | Hard | (Mexico) César Ramírez | (United States) Kevin King (South Africa) Dean O'Brien | 7–6^{(7–1)}, 6–1 |
| Win | 19–17 | May 2014 | Mexico F4, Morelia | Futures | Hard | (Mexico) César Ramírez | (Peru) Mauricio Echazú (Peru) Jorge Brian Panta | 7–6^{(7–3)}, 6–3 |
| Loss | 19–18 | Jul 2014 | Spain F18, Gandia | Futures | Clay | (India) Ramkumar Ramanathan | (Spain) Juan-Samuel Arauzo-Martínez (Canada) Martin Beran | 6–2, 6–7^{(3–7)}, [9–11] |
| Loss | 19–19 | Aug 2014 | Prague, Czech Republic | Challenger | Clay | (Venezuela) Roberto Maytín | (Croatia) Toni Androić (Russia) Andrey Kuznetsov | 5–7, 5–7 |
| Loss | 19–20 | Apr 2015 | Guadalajara, Mexico | Challenger | Hard | (Brazil) Marcelo Demoliner | (United States) Austin Krajicek (United States) Rajeev Ram | 5–7, 6–4, [6–10] |
| Win | 20–20 | May 2015 | Cali, Colombia | Challenger | Clay | (Brazil) Marcelo Demoliner | (Ecuador) Emilio Gómez (Venezuela) Roberto Maytín | 6–1, 6–2 |
| Loss | 20–21 | Jun 2015 | Prague, Czech Republic | Challenger | Clay | (Venezuela) Roberto Maytín | (Poland) Mateusz Kowalczyk (Slovakia) Igor Zelenay | 2–6, 6–7^{(5–7)} |
| Loss | 20–22 | Jul 2015 | San Benedetto, Italy | Challenger | Clay | (Mexico) César Ramírez | (Croatia) Dino Marcan (Croatia) Antonio Šančić | 3–6, 7–6^{(12–10)}, [10–12] |
| Loss | 20–23 | Jan 2016 | Rio de Janeiro, Brazil | Challenger | Clay | (France) Jonathan Eysseric | (Portugal) Gastão Elias (Brazil) André Ghem | 4–6, 6–7^{(2–7)} |
| Loss | 20–24 | Jun 2016 | Caltanissetta, Italy | Challenger | Clay | (El Salvador) Marcelo Arévalo | (Argentina) Guido Andreozzi (Argentina) Andrés Molteni | 1–6, 2–6 |
| Win | 21–24 | Jun 2016 | Milan, Italy | Challenger | Clay | (United States) Max Schnur | (Italy) Alessandro Motti (Chinese Taipei) Peng Hsien-yin | 1–6, 7–6^{(7–4)}, [10–5] |
| Loss | 21–25 | Jul 2016 | Marburg, Germany | Challenger | Clay | (United States) Max Schnur | (United States) James Cerretani (Austria) Philipp Oswald | 3–6, 2–6 |
| Win | 22–25 | Jul 2017 | Medellín, Colombia | Challenger | Clay | (Barbados) Darian King | (Chile) Nicolás Jarry (Ecuador) Roberto Quiroz | 6–4, 6–4 |
| Win | 23–25 | Sep 2017 | Quito, Ecuador | Challenger | Clay | (El Salvador) Marcelo Arévalo | (Chile) Nicolás Jarry (Ecuador) Roberto Quiroz | 4–6, 6–4, [10–7] |
| Win | 24–25 | Sep 2017 | Bogotá, Colombia | Challenger | Clay | (El Salvador) Marcelo Arévalo | (Croatia) Nikola Mektić (Croatia) Franko Škugor | 6–3, 3–6, [10–6] |
| Win | 25–25 | Sep 2017 | Cary, USA | Challenger | Hard | (El Salvador) Marcelo Arévalo | (Latvia) Miķelis Lībietis (United States) Dennis Novikov | 6–7^{(6–8)}, 7–6^{(7–1)}, [10–6] |
| Loss | 25–26 | Oct 2017 | Tiburon, USA | Challenger | Hard | (El Salvador) Marcelo Arévalo | (Sweden) André Göransson (France) Florian Lakat | 4–6, 4–6 |
| Loss | 25–27 | Oct 2017 | Monterrey, Mexico | Challenger | Hard | (El Salvador) Marcelo Arévalo | (United States) Christopher Eubanks (United States) Evan King | 6–7^{(4–7)}, 3–6 |
| Win | 26–27 | Oct 2017 | Cali, Colombia | Challenger | Clay | (El Salvador) Marcelo Arévalo | (Peru) Sergio Galdós (Brazil) Fabrício Neis | 6–3, 6–4 |
| Win | 27–27 | Oct 2017 | Lima, Peru | Challenger | Clay | (Slovenia) Blaž Rola | (Portugal) Gonçalo Oliveira (Poland) Grzegorz Panfil | 7–5, 6–3 |
| Win | 28–27 | Nov 2017 | Guayaquil, Ecuador | Challenger | Clay | (El Salvador) Marcelo Arévalo | (Bolivia) Hugo Dellien (Bolivia) Federico Zeballos | 6–1, 6–7^{(7–9)}, [10–6] |
| Loss | 28–28 | Nov 2017 | Rio de Janeiro, Brazil | Challenger | Clay | (El Salvador) Marcelo Arévalo | (Argentina) Máximo González (Brazil) Fabrício Neis | 7–5, 4–6, [4–10] |
| Win | 29–28 | Apr 2018 | San Luis Potosí, Mexico | Challenger | Clay | (El Salvador) Marcelo Arévalo | (United Kingdom) Jay Clarke (Germany) Kevin Krawietz | 6–1, 6–4 |
| Win | 30–28 | Apr 2018 | Guadalajara, Mexico | Challenger | Hard | (El Salvador) Marcelo Arévalo | (United Kingdom) Brydan Klein (South Africa) Ruan Roelofse | 7–6^{(7–3)}, 7–5 |
| Loss | 30–29 | May 2018 | Braga, Portugal | Challenger | Clay | (Uruguay) Ariel Behar | (Netherlands) Sander Arends (Canada) Adil Shamasdin | 2–6, 1–6 |
| Win | 31–29 | May 2018 | Lisbon, Portugal | Challenger | Clay | (El Salvador) Marcelo Arévalo | (Poland) Tomasz Bednarek (United States) Hunter Reese | 6–3, 3–6, [10–1] |
| Loss | 31–30 | Sep 2018 | Chicago, USA | Challenger | Hard | (India) Leander Paes | (United Kingdom) Luke Bambridge (United Kingdom) Neal Skupski | 3–6, 4–6 |
| Loss | 31–31 | Oct 2018 | Monterrey, Mexico | Challenger | Hard | (India) Leander Paes | (El Salvador) Marcelo Arévalo (India) Jeevan Nedunchezhiyan | 1–6, 4–6 |
| Win | 32–31 | Oct 2018 | Santo Domingo, Dominican Republic | Challenger | Hard | (India) Leander Paes | (Uruguay) Ariel Behar (Ecuador) Roberto Quiroz | 4–6, 6–3, [10–5] |
| Loss | 32–32 | Oct 2018 | Brest, France | Challenger | Hard (i) | (India) Leander Paes | (Belgium) Sander Gillé (Belgium) Joran Vliegen | 6–3, 4–6, [2–10] |
| Loss | 32–33 | Jan 2019 | Danang, Vietnam | Challenger | Hard | (India) Leander Paes | (Chinese Taipei) Hsieh Cheng-peng (Indonesia) Christopher Rungkat | 3–6, 6–2, [9–11] |
| Win | 33–33 | Apr 2019 | San Luis Potosí, Mexico | Challenger | Clay | (El Salvador) Marcelo Arévalo | (Uruguay) Ariel Behar (Ecuador) Roberto Quiroz | 1–6, 6–4, [12–10] |
| Win | 34–33 | Aug 2019 | Aptos, USA | Challenger | Hard | (El Salvador) Marcelo Arévalo | (United States) Nathan Pasha (United States) Max Schnur | 5–7, 6–3, [10–8] |
| Loss | 34–34 | Sep 2019 | Campinas, Brazil | Challenger | Clay | (Brazil) Fernando Romboli | (Brazil) Orlando Luz (Brazil) Rafael Matos | 7–6^{(7–2)}, 4–6, [8–10] |
| Win | 35-34 | Jan 2020 | Bangkok, Thailand | Challenger | Hard | (Ecuador) Gonzalo Escobar | (China) Zhang Ze (China) Gong Maoxin | 6-3, 6–3 |
| Loss | 35-35 | Feb 2020 | Dallas, United States | Challenger | Hard | (Venezuela) Luis David Martinez | (United States) Dennis Novikov (Portugal) Goncalo Oliveira | 3-6, 4–6 |
| Win | 36-35 | Apr 2021 | Salinas, Ecuador | Challenger | Hard | (Brazil) Fernando Romboli | (Ecuador) Diego Hidalgo (Tunisia) Skander Mansouri | 7-5, 4–6, [10-2] |
| Loss | 36-36 | Jul 2021 | Porto, Portugal | Challenger | Hard | (Argentina) Renzo Olivo | (Argentina) Guido Andreozzi (Argentina) Guillermo Durán | 7-6^{(7–5)}, 6-7^{(5–7)}, [9-11] |
| Win | 37-36 | Aug 2021 | Warsaw, Poland | Challenger | Clay | (Mexico) Hans Hach Verdugo | (Ukraine) Vladyslav Manafov (Poland) Piotr Matuszewski | 6-4, 6–4 |
| Loss | 37-37 | Sep 2021 | Cassis, France | Challenger | Hard | (Mexico) Hans Hach Verdugo | (India) Sriram Balaji (India) Ramkumar Ramanathan | 4-6, 6–3, [6-10] |
| Loss | 37-38 | Oct 2021 | Santiago, Chile | Challenger | Clay | (Mexico) Hans Hach Verdugo | (United States) Evan King (United States) Max Schnur | 6-3, 6-7^{(3–7)}, [14-16] |
| Loss | 37-39 | Nov 2021 | Knoxville, USA | Challenger | Hard (i) | (Mexico) Hans Hach Verdugo | (Tunisia) Malek Jaziri (Slovenia) Blaž Rola | 6-3, 3–6, [5-10] |
| Loss | 37-40 | Nov 2021 | Puerto Vallarta, Mexico | Challenger | Hard | (Mexico) Hans Hach Verdugo | (Netherlands) Gijs Brouwer (United States) Reese Stalder | 4-6, 4–6 |
| Loss | 37-41 | Mar 2022 | Santa Cruz de la Sierra, Bolivia | Challenger | Clay | (Colombia) Nicolás Barrientos | (Netherlands) Jesper de Jong (Netherlands) Bart Stevens | 4–6, 6–3, [6-10] |
| Win | 38-41 | Apr 2022 | San Luis Potosí, Mexico | Challenger | Clay | (Colombia) Nicolás Barrientos | (Venezuela) Luis David Martínez (Brazil) Felipe Meligeni Alves | 7–6^{(13–11)}, 6–2 |
| Win | 39-41 | Apr 2022 | Aguascalientes, Mexico | Challenger | Clay | (Colombia) Nicolás Barrientos | (Portugal) Gonçalo Oliveira (India) Divij Sharan | 7-5, 6–3 |
| Loss | 39-42 | May 2022 | Aix-en-Provence, France | Challenger | Clay | (Colombia) Nicolás Barrientos | (France) Titouan Droguet (France) Kyrian Jacquet | 2-6, 3–6 |
| Win | 40-42 | May 2022 | Heilbronn, Germany | Challenger | Clay | (Colombia) Nicolás Barrientos | (Netherlands) Jelle Sels (Netherlands) Bart Stevens | 7-5, 6–3 |
| Win | 41-42 | May 2022 | Tunis, Tunisia | Challenger | Clay | (Colombia) Nicolás Barrientos | (Austria) Alexander Erler (Austria) Lucas Miedler | 6–7^{(3–7)}, 6–3, [11–9] |
| Win | 42-42 | May 2022 | Forlì, Italy | Challenger | Clay | (Colombia) Nicolás Barrientos | (France) Sadio Doumbia (France) Fabien Reboul | 7–5, 4–6, [10–4] |
| Loss | 42-43 | Jul 2022 | Amersfoort, Netherlands | Challenger | Clay | (Colombia) Nicolás Barrientos | (Netherlands) Robin Haase (Netherlands) Sem Verbeek | 4-6, 6–3, [7-10] |
| Loss | 42-44 | Aug 2022 | Santo Domingo, Dominican Republic | Challenger | Clay | (Colombia) Nicolás Barrientos | (Philippines) Ruben Gonzales (United States) Reese Stalder | 6–7^{(5–7)}, 3–6 |
| Win | 43-44 | Oct 2022 | Gwangju, South Korea | Challenger | Hard | (Colombia) Nicolás Barrientos | (India) Yuki Bhambri (India) Saketh Myneni | 2–6, 6–3, [10–6] |
| Win | 44-44 | Mar 2023 | Puerto Vallarta, Mexico | Challenger | Hard | (United States) Robert Galloway | (Sweden) André Göransson (Japan) Ben McLachlan | 3–0 ret. |
| Win | 45–44 | Apr 2023 | Ostrava, Czech Republic | Challenger | Clay | (United States) Robert Galloway | (Argentina) Guido Andreozzi (Argentina) Guillermo Durán | 7–5, 7–6^{(7–5)} |
| Win | 46–44 | Jun 2023 | Montechiarugolo, Italy | Challenger | Clay | (France) Jonathan Eysseric | (Switzerland) Luca Margaroli (India) Ramkumar Ramanathan | 6–2, 6–3 |
| Win | 47–44 | Mar 2024 | Napoli, Italy | Challenger | Clay | (Argentina) Guido Andreozzi | (France) Theo Arribage (Romania) Victor Vlad Cornea | 6–4, 1–6, [10–7] |
| Loss | 47–45 | Apr 2024 | Madrid, Spain | Challenger | Clay | (Argentina) Guido Andreozzi | (Finland) Harri Heliövaara (United Kingdom) Henry Patten | 5–7, 6–7^{(1–7)} |
| Win | 48–45 | Jun 2024 | Perugia, Italy | Challenger | Clay | (Argentina) Guido Andreozzi | (India) Sriram Balaji (Germany) Andre Begemann | 6–4, 7–5 |
| Win | 49–45 | Aug 2024 | Santo Domingo, Dominican Republic | Challenger | Clay | (Ecuador) Diego Hidalgo | (India) Sriram Balaji (Brazil) Fernando Romboli | 6–7^{(2–7)}, 6–4, [18–16] |
| Loss | 49–46 | May 2025 | Skopje, North Macedonia | Challenger | Clay | (India) Sriram Balaji | (Czech Republic) Andrew Paulson (Czech Republic) Michael Vrbenský | 6–2, 4–6, [6–10] |
| Win | 50–46 | Sep 2025 | Antofagasta, Chile | Challenger | Clay | (Ecuador) Gonzalo Escobar | (Brazil) Luís Britto (Brazil) Matheus Pucinelli de Almeida | 6–3, 4–6, [10–6] |
| Loss | 50–47 | Oct 2025 | Curitiba, Brazil | Challenger | Clay | (Ecuador) Gonzalo Escobar | (Chile) Matías Soto (Bolivia) Federico Zeballos | 4–6, 5–7 |
| Loss | 50–48 | Oct 2025 | Sauípe, Brazil | Challenger | Clay | (Ecuador) Gonzalo Escobar | (Brazil) Luís Miguel (Brazil) Eduardo Ribeiro | 6–7^{(4–7)}, 6–4, [5–10] |
| Win | 51–48 | Oct 2025 | Lima, Peru | Challenger | Clay | (Ecuador) Gonzalo Escobar | (Argentina) Federico Agustín Gómez (Venezuela) Luis David Martínez | 6–4, 6–4 |
| Loss | 51–49 | Nov 2025 | Montevideo, Uruguay | Challenger | Clay | (Ecuador) Gonzalo Escobar | (Argentina) Facundo Mena (Mexico) Rodrigo Pacheco Méndez | 6–3, 3–6, [9–11] |
| Loss | 51–50 | Feb 2026 | Rosario, Argentina | Challenger | Clay | (Brazil) Fernando Romboli | (Uruguay) Ignacio Carou (Argentina) Facundo Mena | 1–6, 4–6 |
| Loss | 51–51 | Mar 2026 | Santiago, Chile | Challenger | Clay | (Bolivia) Federico Zeballos | (Italy) Gianluca Cadenasso (Brazil) Paulo André Saraiva dos Santos | 3–6, 5–7 |
| Loss | 51–52 | Aug 2026 | Cancún, Mexico | Challenger | Hard | Ivan Liutarevich | (India) Sriram Balaji (India) Anirudh Chandrasekar | 3–6, 6–7^{(4–7)} |
| Loss | 51–53 | Sep 2026 | Guangzhou, China | Challenger | Hard | (United States) Reese Stalder | (Australia) Blake Bayldon (India) Arjun Kadhe | 5–7, 6–3, [7–10] |
| Loss | 51–54 | Sep 2026 | Jingshan, China | Challenger | Hard | (United States) Reese Stalder | (Ecuador) Gonzalo Escobar (India) Niki Kaliyanda Poonacha | 5–7, 2–6 |
| Loss | 51–55 | Oct 2026 | Sioux Falls, USA | Challenger | Hard (i) | (United States) Reese Stalder | (Netherlands) Jarno Jans (Belgium) Joran Vliegen | 4–6, 6–7^{(7–9)} |
