= 2021 Challenger Città di Lugano – Doubles =

Doubles
- 2021 Challenger Città di Lugano

Final
- Champions: (Germany) Andre Begemann (Italy) Andrea Vavassori
- Runners-up: (Ukraine) Denys Molchanov (Ukraine) Sergiy Stakhovsky
- Score: 7–6^{(13–11)}, 4–6, [10–8]

Events
Singles	Doubles
Challenger Città di Lugano	· 2022 →

This was the first edition of the tournament.

Andre Begemann and Andrea Vavassori won the title after defeating Denys Molchanov and Sergiy Stakhovsky 7–6^{(13–11)}, 4–6, [10–8] in the final.

== Seeds ==
1. (Germany) Andre Begemann / (Italy) Andrea Vavassori (champions)
2. (India) Purav Raja / (Austria) Tristan-Samuel Weissborn (quarterfinals)
3. (Spain) Sergio Martos Gornés / (New Zealand) Artem Sitak (semifinals)
4. (Ukraine) Denys Molchanov / (Ukraine) Sergiy Stakhovsky (final)

== Draw ==
Key

- Q = Qualifier
- WC = Wild card
- LL = Lucky loser
- Alt = Alternate
- ITF = ITF entry
- PR = Protected ranking
- SR = Special ranking
- SE = Special exempt
- JE = Junior exempt
- JR = Junior Accelerator Programme entrant
- CO = College Accelerator Programme entrant
- NG = Next Gen Accelerator Program entrant
- w/o = Walkover
- r = Retired
- d = Defaulted

First round
1	(Germany) A Begemann (Italy) A Vavassori	5	6	[10]
WC	(Switzerland) L Riedi (Switzerland) D Stricker	7	3	[8]
(United States) N Pasha (United States) M Schnur	7^{7}	3	[6]
Alt	(Turkey) A Çelikbilek (Ukraine) V Sachko	6^{1}	6	[10]
3	(Spain) S Martos Gornés (New Zealand) A Sitak	6	5	[10]
Alt	(Netherlands) J Sels (Netherlands) T van Rijthoven	4	7	[6]
(Australia) M Polmans (Australia) A Vukic	6	6
(United Kingdom) J Clarke (United Kingdom) R Peniston	3	4
(Germany) J Lenz (Germany) D Masur	6	6
WC	(Switzerland) R Bertola (Switzerland) Nicolás Parizzia	1	1
(Spain) D Marrero (Spain) A Menéndez Maceiras	6	4	[4]
4	(Ukraine) D Molchanov (Ukraine) S Stakhovsky	4	6	[10]
(Poland) S Walków (Poland) J Zieliński	7^{7}	6^{6}	[10]
(Switzerland) L Margaroli (United States) J Sock	6^{2}	7^{8}	[3]
WC	(Russia) D Golubev (Russia) E Tiurnev	4	6	[7]
2	(India) P Raja (Austria) T-S Weissborn	6	3	[10]

Quarterfinals
1	(Germany) A Begemann (Italy) A Vavassori	6	6
Alt	(Turkey) A Çelikbilek (Ukraine) V Sachko	2	2
3	(Spain) S Martos Gornés (New Zealand) A Sitak	1	6	[17]
(Australia) M Polmans (Australia) A Vukic	6	3	[15]
(Germany) J Lenz (Germany) D Masur	5	6	[12]
4	(Ukraine) D Molchanov (Ukraine) S Stakhovsky	7	3	[14]
(Poland) S Walków (Poland) J Zieliński	6	6
2	(India) P Raja (Austria) T-S Weissborn	4	2

Semifinals
1	(Germany) A Begemann (Italy) A Vavassori	7	6
3	(Spain) S Martos Gornés (New Zealand) A Sitak	5	1
4	(Ukraine) D Molchanov (Ukraine) S Stakhovsky	4	7^{7}	[10]
(Poland) S Walków (Poland) J Zieliński	6	6^{3}	[4]

Final
1	(Germany) A Begemann (Italy) A Vavassori	7^{13}	4	[10]
4	(Ukraine) D Molchanov (Ukraine) S Stakhovsky	6^{11}	6	[8]
