= 2023 Challenger Città di Lugano – Doubles =

Doubles
- 2023 Challenger Città di Lugano

Final
- Champions: (Belgium) Zizou Bergs (Netherlands) David Pel
- Runners-up: (Germany) Constantin Frantzen (Germany) Hendrik Jebens
- Score: 6–2, 7–6^{(8–6)}

Events
Singles	Doubles
← 2022 ·	Challenger Città di Lugano	· 2024 →

Ruben Bemelmans and Daniel Masur were the defending champions but only Masur chose to defend his title, partnering Marco Bortolotti. They withdrew before their first round match.

Zizou Bergs and David Pel won the title after defeating Constantin Frantzen and Hendrik Jebens 6–2, 7–6^{(8–6)} in the final.

== Seeds ==
1. (Jamaica) Dustin Brown / (Pakistan) Aisam-ul-Haq Qureshi (quarterfinals)
2. (Monaco) Romain Arneodo / (Austria) Sam Weissborn (quarterfinals)
3. (France) Dan Added / (France) Albano Olivetti (first round)
4. (Finland) Patrik Niklas-Salminen / (Netherlands) Bart Stevens (first round)

== Draw ==
=== Key ===
- Q = Qualifier
- WC = Wild card
- LL = Lucky loser
- Alt = Alternate
- SE = Special exempt
- PR = Protected ranking
- ITF = ITF entry
- JE = Junior exempt
- w/o = Walkover
- r = Retired
- d = Defaulted
- SR = Special ranking

First round
1	(Jamaica) D Brown (Pakistan) A-u-H Qureshi	6	6^{5}	[15]
WC	(Peru) A Merino (Switzerland) J Paul	3	7^{7}	[13]
(France) J Eysseric (India) R Ramanathan	2	6^{1}
(Austria) N Oberleitner (Austria) P Oswald	6	7^{7}
3	(France) D Added (France) A Olivetti	5	7^{7}	[10]
(Norway) V Durasovic (Finland) O Virtanen	7	6^{2}	[12]
(Germany) C Frantzen (Germany) H Jebens	7^{7}	7^{7}
(Ukraine) V Manafov (Ukraine) O Prihodko	6^{2}	6^{4}
(Romania) VV Cornea (Croatia) F Škugor	6^{4}	1
(Belgium) Z Bergs (Netherlands) D Pel	7^{7}	6
(Poland) K Drzewiecki (Poland) S Walków	6	3	[10]
4	(Finland) P Niklas-Salminen (Netherlands) B Stevens	4	6	[7]
WC	(Latvia) M Lībietis (Switzerland) L Margaroli	6^{3}	7^{9}	[10]
(United Kingdom) L Broady (Netherlands) J Sels	7^{7}	6^{7}	[7]
Alt	(Bulgaria) A Andreev (Ukraine) O Krutykh	3	2
2	(Monaco) R Arneodo (Austria) S Weissborn	6	6

Quarterfinals
1	(Jamaica) D Brown (Pakistan) A-u-H Qureshi	6^{0}	6^{6}
(Austria) N Oberleitner (Austria) P Oswald	7^{7}	7^{8}
(Norway) V Durasovic (Finland) O Virtanen	3	4
(Germany) C Frantzen (Germany) H Jebens	6	6
(Belgium) Z Bergs (Netherlands) D Pel	7^{7}	7^{7}
(Poland) K Drzewiecki (Poland) S Walków	6^{4}	6^{5}
WC	(Latvia) M Lībietis (Switzerland) L Margaroli	7^{7}	7
2	(Monaco) R Arneodo (Austria) S Weissborn	6^{2}	5

Semifinals
(Austria) N Oberleitner (Austria) P Oswald	3	6^{3}
(Germany) C Frantzen (Germany) H Jebens	6	7^{7}
(Belgium) Z Bergs (Netherlands) D Pel	7^{11}	6^{3}	[10]
WC	(Latvia) M Lībietis (Switzerland) L Margaroli	6^{9}	7^{7}	[4]

Final
(Germany) C Frantzen (Germany) H Jebens	2	6^{6}
(Belgium) Z Bergs (Netherlands) D Pel	6	7^{8}
