= 2025 Challenger Città di Lugano – Singles =

Singles
- 2025 Challenger Città di Lugano

Final
- Champion: (Croatia) Borna Ćorić
- Runner-up: (Belgium) Raphaël Collignon
- Score: 6–3, 6–1

Events
Singles	Doubles
← 2024 ·	Challenger Città di Lugano	· 2026 →

Otto Virtanen was the defending champion but chose not to defend his title.

Borna Ćorić won the title after defeating Raphaël Collignon 6–3, 6–1 in the final.

== Seeds ==
1. (Belgium) Raphaël Collignon (final)
2. (Croatia) Borna Ćorić (champion)
3. (France) Luca Van Assche (quarterfinals)
4. (Belgium) Alexander Blockx (second round)
5. (France) Hugo Grenier (second round)
6. (Germany) Henri Squire (quarterfinals)
7. (Lithuania) Vilius Gaubas (quarterfinals)
8. (Canada) Liam Draxl (quarterfinals)

== Draw ==
=== Key ===
- Q = Qualifier
- WC = Wild card
- LL = Lucky loser
- Alt = Alternate
- ITF = ITF entry
- PR = Protected ranking
- SR = Special ranking
- SE = Special exempt
- JE = Junior exempt
- JR = Junior Accelerator Programme entrant
- CO = College Accelerator Programme entrant
- NG = Next Gen Accelerator Program entrant
- w/o = Walkover
- r = Retired
- d = Defaulted

=== Finals ===
Semifinals
1	(Belgium) Raphaël Collignon	7^{7}	4	6
Q	(United States) Murphy Cassone	6^{3}	6	3
Q	(Croatia) Dino Prižmić	2	4
2	(Croatia) Borna Ćorić	6	6

Final
1	(Belgium) Raphaël Collignon	3	1
2	(Croatia) Borna Ćorić	6	6

=== Top half ===
First round
1	(Belgium) R Collignon	6	7
Q	(Ukraine) V Sachko	4	5
SE	(Norway) V Durasovic	6	1	6
(Lebanon) B Hassan	4	6	4
(France) C Chidekh	3	6	4
(Finland) E Ruusuvuori	6	3	6
Q	(Japan) R Sakamoto	4	4
8	(Canada) L Draxl	6	6
3	(France) L Van Assche	2	6	6
Alt	(Chinese Taipei) T-l Wu	6	2	0
SE	(Germany) P Zahraj	2	7^{7}	3
(United Kingdom) J Choinski	6	6^{3}	6
Q	(Lithuania) R Berankis	1	2
Q	(United States) M Cassone	6	6
LL	(China) J Cui	2	4
5	(France) H Grenier	6	6

Second round
1	(Belgium) R Collignon	6	7
SE	(Norway) V Durasovic	4	5
(Finland) E Ruusuvuori	4	6^{2}
8	(Canada) L Draxl	6	7^{7}
3	(France) L Van Assche	6	6
(United Kingdom) J Choinski	3	1
Q	(United States) M Cassone	7^{9}	7^{8}
5	(France) H Grenier	6^{7}	6^{6}

Quarterfinals
1	(Belgium) R Collignon	6	6
8	(Canada) L Draxl	4	4
3	(France) L Van Assche	6^{2}	6	6^{4}
Q	(United States) M Cassone	7^{7}	0	7^{7}

Semifinals
1	(Belgium) R Collignon	7^{7}	4	6
Q	(United States) M Cassone	6^{3}	6	3

=== Bottom half ===
First round
7	(Lithuania) V Gaubas	6	1	6
PR	(Switzerland) D Stricker	3	6	2
(Kazakhstan) B Zhukayev	6	6^{10}	6^{5}
(Netherlands) M Röttgering	4	7^{12}	7^{7}
Q	(Croatia) D Prižmić	6	6
WC	(Switzerland) J Paul	3	2
LL	(Bolivia) JC Prado Ángelo	2	3
4	(Belgium) A Blockx	6	6
6	(Germany) H Squire	6	7
Alt	(Bulgaria) A Andreev	3	5
Q	(Lithuania) E Butvilas	6	5	6^{4}
WC	(Switzerland) R Bertola	2	7	7^{7}
(France) A Escoffier	6	6
WC	(Switzerland) M Brunold	2	3
(Belgium) G Onclin	4	2
2	(Croatia) B Ćorić	6	6

Second round
7	(Lithuania) V Gaubas	6^{2}	7	6
(Netherlands) M Röttgering	7^{7}	5	4
Q	(Croatia) D Prižmić	6	6
4	(Belgium) A Blockx	3	2
6	(Germany) H Squire	7^{7}	6
WC	(Switzerland) R Bertola	6^{5}	4
(France) A Escoffier	4	4
2	(Croatia) B Ćorić	6	6

Quarterfinals
7	(Lithuania) V Gaubas	2	3
Q	(Croatia) D Prižmić	6	6
6	(Germany) H Squire	2	2
2	(Croatia) B Ćorić	6	6

Semifinals
Q	(Croatia) D Prižmić	2	4
2	(Croatia) B Ćorić	6	6
