= 2022 Challenger Città di Lugano – Singles =

Singles
- 2022 Challenger Città di Lugano

Final
- Champion: (Italy) Luca Nardi
- Runner-up: (Switzerland) Leandro Riedi
- Score: 4–6, 6–2, 6–3

Events
Singles	Doubles
- Challenger Città di Lugano

Dominic Stricker was the defending champion but lost in the first round to Jurij Rodionov.

Luca Nardi won the title after defeating Leandro Riedi 4–6, 6–2, 6–3 in the final.

== Seeds ==
1. (United States) Maxime Cressy (first round)
2. (Moldova) Radu Albot (first round)
3. (Germany) Mats Moraing (first round)
4. (France) Pierre-Hugues Herbert (semifinals)
5. (Bosnia and Herzegovina) Damir Džumhur (second round)
6. (Austria) Dennis Novak (first round)
7. (France) Hugo Grenier (first round)
8. (Switzerland) Dominic Stricker (first round)

== Draw ==
Key

- Q = Qualifier
- WC = Wild card
- LL = Lucky loser
- Alt = Alternate
- ITF = ITF entry
- PR = Protected ranking
- SR = Special ranking
- SE = Special exempt
- JE = Junior exempt
- JR = Junior Accelerator Programme entrant
- CO = College Accelerator Programme entrant
- NG = Next Gen Accelerator Program entrant
- w/o = Walkover
- r = Retired
- d = Defaulted

=== Finals ===
Semifinals
WC	(Switzerland) Leandro Riedi	3	7^{7}	7^{7}
4	(France) Pierre-Hugues Herbert	6	6^{3}	6^{3}
(Germany) Cedrik-Marcel Stebe	1	1
Alt	(Italy) Luca Nardi	6	6

Final
WC	(Switzerland) Leandro Riedi	6	2	3
Alt	(Italy) Luca Nardi	4	6	6

=== Top half ===
First round
1	(United States) M Cressy	6^{2}	7^{7}	4
WC	(Switzerland) L Riedi	7^{7}	6^{3}	6
Q	(France) D Added	6	7
(Germany) D Masur	4	5
(Switzerland) M-A Hüsler	6	6
(Italy) A Arnaboldi	4	2
(Italy) T Fabbiano	3	2
5	(Bosnia and Herzegovina) D Džumhur	6	6
4	(France) P-H Herbert	7^{7}	6
(Slovakia) F Horanský	6^{2}	4
(Netherlands) T van Rijthoven	7^{7}	6^{4}	7
Q	(Netherlands) G Brouwer	6^{4}	7^{7}	5
WC	(Switzerland) K Feldbausch	1	2
Q	(Finland) O Virtanen	6	6
Alt	(Romania) M Copil	6	2	6
6	(Austria) D Novak	4	6	3

Second round
WC	(Switzerland) L Riedi	6	6
Q	(France) D Added	4	2
(Switzerland) M-A Hüsler	6	6
5	(Bosnia and Herzegovina) D Džumhur	3	2
4	(France) P-H Herbert	6	7
(Netherlands) T van Rijthoven	3	5
Q	(Finland) O Virtanen	1	4
Alt	(Romania) M Copil	6	6

Quarterfinals
WC	(Switzerland) L Riedi	6	7^{7}
(Switzerland) M-A Hüsler	2	6^{4}
4	(France) P-H Herbert	2	6	6
Alt	(Romania) M Copil	6	4	4

Semifinals
WC	(Switzerland) L Riedi	3	7^{7}	7^{7}
4	(France) P-H Herbert	6	6^{3}	6^{3}

=== Bottom half ===
First round
8	(Switzerland) D Stricker	3	5
(Austria) J Rodionov	6	7
Q	(South Korea) Y-s Chung	3	4
(Japan) Y Sugita	6	6
(Poland) K Żuk	3	3
(Germany) C-M Stebe	6	6
(Bosnia and Herzegovina) M Bašić	7^{7}	6
3	(Germany) M Moraing	6^{4}	3
7	(France) H Grenier	3	4
Alt	(Italy) L Nardi	6	6
Q	(Bosnia and Herzegovina) A Šetkić	7^{7}	6
WC	(Switzerland) R Bertola	6^{5}	4
(France) A Müller	3	6^{2}
Q	(Switzerland) J Kym	6	7^{7}
P Kotov	6	6
2	(Moldova) R Albot	2	3

Second round
(Austria) J Rodionov	6	6
(Japan) Y Sugita	3	0
(Germany) C-M Stebe	4	6	6
(Bosnia and Herzegovina) M Bašić	6	4	3
Alt	(Italy) L Nardi	6	6
Q	(Bosnia and Herzegovina) A Šetkić	4	4
Q	(Switzerland) J Kym	3	6	6
P Kotov	6	2	1

Quarterfinals
(Austria) J Rodionov	1	1
(Germany) C-M Stebe	6	6
Alt	(Italy) L Nardi	4	6	7^{9}
Q	(Switzerland) J Kym	6	3	6^{7}

Semifinals
(Germany) C-M Stebe	1	1
Alt	(Italy) L Nardi	6	6
