= 2023 Challenger Città di Lugano =

- Date: 6–12 March
- Edition: 3rd
- Surface: Hard (indoor)
- Location: Lugano, Switzerland

Champions

Singles
- (Finland) Otto Virtanen

Doubles
- (Belgium) Zizou Bergs / (Netherlands) David Pel
← 2022 ·	Challenger Città di Lugano	· 2024 →

The 2023 Challenger Città di Lugano was a professional tennis tournament played on indoor hard courts. It was the 3rd edition of the tournament which was part of the 2023 ATP Challenger Tour. It took place in Lugano, Switzerland between 6 and 12 March 2023.

== Singles main-draw entrants ==
=== Seeds ===
Country	Player	Rank^{1}	Seed
NED	Gijs Brouwer	114	1
SUI	Dominic Stricker	120	2
SVK	Norbert Gombos	126	3
ITA	Raúl Brancaccio	129	4
GBR	Liam Broady	135	5
BEL	Zizou Bergs	137	6
SVK	Lukáš Klein	140	7
NED	Jelle Sels	144	8

- ^{1} Rankings are as of 27 February 2023.

=== Other entrants ===
The following players received wildcards into the singles main draw:

- (Switzerland) Mika Brunold
- (France) Pierre-Hugues Herbert
- (Switzerland) Jakub Paul

The following player received entry into the singles main draw as an alternate:

- (Belgium) Raphaël Collignon

The following players received entry from the qualifying draw:

- (France) Dan Added
- (Romania) Marius Copil
- (France) Calvin Hemery
- (Turkey) Cem İlkel
- (Belgium) Gauthier Onclin
- (Ukraine) Vitaliy Sachko

== Champions ==
=== Singles ===
- (Finland) Otto Virtanen def. (Turkey) Cem İlkel 6–4, 7–6^{(7–5)}.

=== Doubles ===
- (Belgium) Zizou Bergs / (Netherlands) David Pel def. (Germany) Constantin Frantzen / (Germany) Hendrik Jebens 6–2, 7–6^{(8–6)}.
