= 2025 Challenger Città di Lugano =

- Date: 24 February – 2 March
- Edition: 5th
- Surface: Hard (indoor)
- Location: Lugano, Switzerland

Champions

Singles
- (Croatia) Borna Ćorić

Doubles
- (Canada) Cleeve Harper / (United Kingdom) David Stevenson
← 2024 ·	Challenger Città di Lugano	· 2026 →

The 2025 Challenger Città di Lugano was a professional tennis tournament played on indoor hardcourts. It was the fifth edition of the tournament which was part of the 2025 ATP Challenger Tour. It took place in Lugano, Switzerland between 24 February and 2 March 2025.

== Singles main-draw entrants ==
=== Seeds ===
Country	Player	Rank^{1}	Seed
BEL	Raphaël Collignon	122	1
CRO	Borna Ćorić	145	2
FRA	Luca Van Assche	152	3
BEL	Alexander Blockx	158	4
FRA	Hugo Grenier	169	5
GER	Henri Squire	179	6
LTU	Vilius Gaubas	181	7
CAN	Liam Draxl	184	8

- ^{1} Rankings are as of 17 February 2025.

=== Other entrants ===
The following players received wildcards into the singles main draw:

- (Switzerland) Rémy Bertola
- (Switzerland) Mika Brunold
- (Switzerland) Jakub Paul

The following players received entry into the singles main draw as special exempts:

- (Norway) Viktor Durasovic
- (Germany) Patrick Zahraj

The following player received entry into the singles main draw using a protected ranking:

- (Switzerland) Dominic Stricker

The following players received entry into the singles main draw as alternates:

- (Bulgaria) Adrian Andreev
- (Chinese Taipei) Wu Tung-lin

The following players received entry from the qualifying draw:

- (Lithuania) Ričardas Berankis
- (Lithuania) Edas Butvilas
- (United States) Murphy Cassone
- (Croatia) Dino Prižmić
- (Ukraine) Vitaliy Sachko
- (Japan) Rei Sakamoto

The following players received entry as lucky losers:

- (China) Cui Jie
- (Bolivia) Juan Carlos Prado Ángelo

== Champions ==
=== Singles ===
- (Croatia) Borna Ćorić def. (Belgium) Raphaël Collignon 6–3, 6–1.

=== Doubles ===
- (Canada) Cleeve Harper / (United Kingdom) David Stevenson def. (Switzerland) Jakub Paul / (Netherlands) David Pel 4–6, 6–3, [10–8].
