= 2026 Challenger Città di Lugano – Singles =

Singles
- 2026 Challenger Città di Lugano

Final
- Champion: (Hungary) Zsombor Piros
- Runner-up: (Austria) Joel Schwärzler
- Score: 7–5, 4–6, 6–3

Events
Singles	Doubles
- Challenger Città di Lugano

Borna Ćorić was the defending champion but chose not to defend his title.

Zsombor Piros won the title after defeating Joel Schwärzler 7–5, 4–6, 6–3 in the final.

== Seeds ==
1. (Norway) Nicolai Budkov Kjær (quarterfinals)
2. (Estonia) Daniil Glinka (second round)
3. (Hungary) Zsombor Piros (champion)
4. (Ukraine) Vitaliy Sachko (first round)
5. (United States) Nishesh Basavareddy (withdrew)
6. (France) Hugo Grenier (first round)
7. (Kazakhstan) Timofey Skatov (second round)
8. (Denmark) August Holmgren (second round)

== Draw ==
Key

- Q = Qualifier
- WC = Wild card
- LL = Lucky loser
- Alt = Alternate
- ITF = ITF entry
- PR = Protected ranking
- SR = Special ranking
- SE = Special exempt
- JE = Junior exempt
- JR = Junior Accelerator Programme entrant
- CO = College Accelerator Programme entrant
- NG = Next Gen Accelerator Program entrant
- w/o = Walkover
- r = Retired
- d = Defaulted

=== Finals ===
Semifinals
(Croatia) Matej Dodig	6^{4}	4
(Austria) Joel Schwärzler	7^{7}	6
3	(Hungary) Zsombor Piros	7	6
WC	(Switzerland) Mika Brunold	5	3

Final
(Austria) Joel Schwärzler	5	6	3
3	(Hungary) Zsombor Piros	7	4	6

=== Top half ===
First round
1	(Norway) N Budkov Kjær	6	6
WC	(Switzerland) H Bernet	1	4
(United States) M Cassone	6^{3}	6	4
LL	(Bulgaria) P Nesterov	7^{7}	4	6
(Croatia) M Dodig	6	6
Q	(Czech Republic) J Forejtek	2	4
(Germany) T Gentzsch	3	5
7	(Kazakhstan) T Skatov	6	7
4	(Ukraine) V Sachko	6^{5}	2
Q	(Czech Republic) Petr Brunclík	7^{7}	6
(Austria) J Schwärzler	6	6
Q	(Bosnia and Herzegovina) M Bašić	3	3
(Bosnia and Herzegovina) N Fatić	6	3	6^{3}
(Spain) A Moro Cañas	2	6	7^{7}
WC	(Switzerland) D Stricker	6	6
6	(France) H Grenier	4	3

Second round
1	(Norway) N Budkov Kjær	7	6
LL	(Bulgaria) P Nesterov	5	1
(Croatia) M Dodig	6	4	6
7	(Kazakhstan) T Skatov	3	6	4
Q	(Czech Republic) P Brunclík	6^{2}	6	6^{4}
(Austria) J Schwärzler	7^{7}	3	7^{7}
(Spain) A Moro Cañas	4	2
WC	(Switzerland) D Stricker	6	6

Quarterfinals
1	(Norway) N Budkov Kjær	6^{4}	5
(Croatia) M Dodig	7^{7}	7
(Austria) J Schwärzler	6	6
WC	(Switzerland) D Stricker	4	3

Semifinals
(Croatia) M Dodig	6^{4}	4
(Austria) J Schwärzler	7^{7}	6

=== Bottom half ===
First round
LL	(United States) A Rybakov	4	6	5
NG	(Czech Republic) M Mrva	6	2	7
(Switzerland) R Bertola	4	7^{7}	4
(United States) M Mmoh	6	6^{2}	6
I Gakhov	2	6	7^{8}
Q	(Italy) G Piraino	6	2	6^{6}
(Germany) H Squire	5	6^{5}
3	(Hungary) Z Piros	7	7^{7}
8	(Denmark) A Holmgren	7^{12}	5	6
(Japan) K Uchida	6^{10}	7	2
WC	(Switzerland) M Brunold	7	6^{2}	6
Q	(Luxembourg) A Knaff	5	7^{7}	3
(Germany) M Topo	6	4	0^{r}
(Switzerland) M-A Hüsler	2	6	0
Q	(Switzerland) D Dietrich	3	4
2	(Estonia) D Glinka	6	6

Second round
NG	(Czech Republic) M Mrva	1	6	6
(United States) M Mmoh	6	4	4
I Gakhov	6^{1}	3
3	(Hungary) Z Piros	7^{7}	6
8	(Denmark) A Holmgren	5	6^{3}
WC	(Switzerland) M Brunold	7	7^{7}
(Switzerland) M-A Hüsler	7^{7}	6
2	(Estonia) D Glinka	6^{5}	4

Quarterfinals
NG	(Czech Republic) M Mrva	4	2
3	(Hungary) Z Piros	6	6
WC	(Switzerland) M Brunold	6	6
(Switzerland) M-A Hüsler	4	4

Semifinals
3	(Hungary) Z Piros	7	6
WC	(Switzerland) M Brunold	5	3
