= 2023 Challenger Città di Lugano – Singles =

Singles
- 2023 Challenger Città di Lugano

Final
- Champion: (Finland) Otto Virtanen
- Runner-up: (Turkey) Cem İlkel
- Score: 6–4, 7–6^{(7–5)}

Events
Singles	Doubles
- Challenger Città di Lugano

Luca Nardi was the defending champion but chose not to defend his title.

Otto Virtanen won the title after defeating Cem İlkel 6–4, 7–6^{(7–5)} in the final.

== Seeds ==
1. (Netherlands) Gijs Brouwer (first round)
2. (Switzerland) Dominic Stricker (semifinals)
3. (Slovakia) Norbert Gombos (first round)
4. (Italy) Raúl Brancaccio (second round)
5. (United Kingdom) Liam Broady (quarterfinals)
6. (Belgium) Zizou Bergs (first round)
7. (Slovakia) Lukáš Klein (first round)
8. (Netherlands) Jelle Sels (first round)

== Draw ==
Key

- Q = Qualifier
- WC = Wild card
- LL = Lucky loser
- Alt = Alternate
- ITF = ITF entry
- PR = Protected ranking
- SR = Special ranking
- SE = Special exempt
- JE = Junior exempt
- JR = Junior Accelerator Programme entrant
- CO = College Accelerator Programme entrant
- NG = Next Gen Accelerator Program entrant
- w/o = Walkover
- r = Retired
- d = Defaulted

=== Finals ===
Semifinals
Q	(Turkey) Cem İlkel	7^{7}	4	6
(France) Antoine Escoffier	6^{5}	6	3
(Finland) Otto Virtanen	6^{3}	6	6
2	(Switzerland) Dominic Stricker	7^{7}	3	0

Final
Q	(Turkey) Cem İlkel	4	6^{5}
(Finland) Otto Virtanen	6	7^{7}

=== Top half ===
First round
1	(Netherlands) G Brouwer	2	5
(Turkey) A Çelikbilek	6	7
Q	(Ukraine) V Sachko	6	6
WC	(Switzerland) J Paul	4	3
(Hungary) Z Piros	6	4	5
(Switzerland) A Ritschard	3	6	7
Q	(Turkey) C İlkel	6	4	7
7	(Slovakia) L Klein	4	6	5
4	(Italy) R Brancaccio	6	1
(Germany) P Gojowczyk	1	0^{r}
WC	(Switzerland) M Brunold	4	6	6
(France) M Guinard	6	2	2
(Bulgaria) A Andreev	6^{4}	7^{7}	6
(Switzerland) A Bellier	7^{7}	6^{4}	3
(France) A Escoffier	6	6
6	(Belgium) Z Bergs	2	4

Second round
(Turkey) A Çelikbilek	4	3
Q	(Ukraine) V Sachko	6	6
(Switzerland) A Ritschard	6	1	4
Q	(Turkey) C İlkel	2	6	6
4	(Italy) R Brancaccio	5	3
WC	(Switzerland) M Brunold	7	6
(Bulgaria) A Andreev	6^{6}	3
(France) A Escoffier	7^{8}	6

Quarterfinals
Q	(Ukraine) V Sachko	2	5
Q	(Turkey) C İlkel	6	7
WC	(Switzerland) M Brunold	0	3
(France) A Escoffier	6	6

Semifinals
Q	(Turkey) C İlkel	7^{7}	4	6
(France) A Escoffier	6^{5}	6	3

=== Bottom half ===
First round
8	(Netherlands) J Sels	4	5
(Ukraine) O Krutykh	6	7
(Finland) O Virtanen	6^{4}	6	6
(Italy) M Gigante	7^{7}	3	2
(France) H Grenier	7^{7}	6
Q	(France) C Hemery	6^{4}	1
(Lithuania) R Berankis	6	7^{7}
3	(Slovakia) N Gombos	3	6^{2}
5	(United Kingdom) L Broady	6	6
(Kazakhstan) M Kukushkin	3	2
Q	(Romania) M Copil	6^{11}	0^{r}
WC	(France) P-H Herbert	7^{13}	0
Q	(Belgium) G Onclin	6	6
Q	(France) D Added	4	2
Alt	(Belgium) R Collignon	4	6	2
2	(Switzerland) D Stricker	6	2	6

Second round
(Ukraine) O Krutykh	4	6	6^{5}
(Finland) O Virtanen	6	2	7^{7}
(France) H Grenier	4	6	5
(Lithuania) R Berankis	6	1	7
5	(United Kingdom) L Broady	6	6
WC	(France) P-H Herbert	1	3
Q	(Belgium) G Onclin	3	3
2	(Switzerland) D Stricker	6	6

Quarterfinals
(Finland) O Virtanen	6	6
(Lithuania) R Berankis	4	3
5	(United Kingdom) L Broady	6	3	6^{4}
2	(Switzerland) D Stricker	3	6	7^{7}

Semifinals
(Finland) O Virtanen	6^{3}	6	6
2	(Switzerland) D Stricker	7^{7}	3	0
