= 2026 Challenger Città di Lugano – Doubles =

Doubles
- 2026 Challenger Città di Lugano

Final
- Champions: (Serbia) Stefan Latinović (Ukraine) Vitaliy Sachko
- Runners-up: (Bosnia and Herzegovina) Mirza Bašić (Bosnia and Herzegovina) Nerman Fatić
- Score: 6–3, 6–4

Events
Singles	Doubles
- Challenger Città di Lugano

Cleeve Harper and David Stevenson were the defending champions but chose not to defend their title.

Stefan Latinović and Vitaliy Sachko won the title after defeating Mirza Bašić and Nerman Fatić 6–3, 6–4 in the final.

== Seeds ==
1. (United States) Benjamin Kittay / (United States) Ryan Seggerman (quarterfinals)
2. (Israel) Daniel Cukierman / (United States) Trey Hilderbrand (semifinals)
3. (Ukraine) Denys Molchanov / (Netherlands) Mick Veldheer (withdrew)
4. (Spain) Sergio Martos Gornés / (Spain) Bruno Pujol Navarro (first round)

== Draw ==
Key

- Q = Qualifier
- WC = Wild card
- LL = Lucky loser
- Alt = Alternate
- ITF = ITF entry
- PR = Protected ranking
- SR = Special ranking
- SE = Special exempt
- JE = Junior exempt
- JR = Junior Accelerator Programme entrant
- CO = College Accelerator Programme entrant
- NG = Next Gen Accelerator Program entrant
- w/o = Walkover
- r = Retired
- d = Defaulted

First round
1	(United States) B Kittay (United States) R Seggerman	6	6
(Czech Republic) D Poljak (Germany) T Rühl	2	2
(Australia) B Bayldon (Australia) C Puttergill	3	6	[7]
(Serbia) S Latinović (Ukraine) V Sachko	6	3	[10]
4	(Spain) S Martos Gornés (Spain) B Pujol Navarro	1	7	[6]
WC	(Switzerland) J Nikles (Switzerland) Jeffrey von der Schulenburg	6	5	[10]
(Czech Republic) J Jermář (United Kingdom) M Whitehouse	6^{4}	6^{12}
WC	(Switzerland) H Bernet (Switzerland) R Bertola	7^{7}	7^{14}
(Bosnia and Herzegovina) M Bašić (Bosnia and Herzegovina) N Fatić	2	7^{7}	[10]
(Sweden) E Grevelius (Sweden) A Heinonen	6	6^{2}	[7]
(Switzerland) Nicolás Parizzia (Spain) D Vega Hernández	6^{3}	7^{8}	[5]
Alt	(Bulgaria) P Nesterov (Ukraine) O Ovcharenko	7^{7}	6^{6}	[10]
(Netherlands) J Jans (Netherlands) N Visker	6	5	[12]
(Serbia) I Sabanov (Serbia) M Sabanov	3	7	[10]
(Romania) A Jecan (Italy) G Ricca	3	5
2	(Israel) D Cukierman (United States) T Hilderbrand	6	7

Quarterfinals
1	(United States) B Kittay (United States) R Seggerman	6^{4}	7^{7}	[4]
(Serbia) S Latinović (Ukraine) V Sachko	7^{7}	6^{4}	[10]
WC	(Switzerland) J Nikles (Switzerland) J von der Schulenburg	3	7^{7}	[10]
WC	(Switzerland) H Bernet (Switzerland) R Bertola	6	6^{4}	[4]
(Bosnia and Herzegovina) M Bašić (Bosnia and Herzegovina) N Fatić	7^{7}	7
Alt	(Bulgaria) P Nesterov (Ukraine) O Ovcharenko	6^{4}	5
(Netherlands) J Jans (Netherlands) N Visker	3	3
2	(Israel) D Cukierman (United States) T Hilderbrand	6	6

Semifinals
(Serbia) S Latinović (Ukraine) V Sachko	2	6	[10]
WC	(Switzerland) J Nikles (Switzerland) J von der Schulenburg	6	4	[7]
(Bosnia and Herzegovina) M Bašić (Bosnia and Herzegovina) N Fatić	7	6^{4}	[10]
2	(Israel) D Cukierman (United States) T Hilderbrand	5	7^{7}	[8]

Final
(Serbia) S Latinović (Ukraine) V Sachko	6	6
(Bosnia and Herzegovina) M Bašić (Bosnia and Herzegovina) N Fatić	3	4
