= 2024 Challenger Città di Lugano – Doubles =

Doubles
- 2024 Challenger Città di Lugano

Final
- Champions: (Netherlands) Sander Arends (Netherlands) Sem Verbeek
- Runners-up: (Germany) Constantin Frantzen (Germany) Hendrik Jebens
- Score: 6–7^{(9–11)}, 7–6^{(7–1)}, [10–8]

Events
Singles	Doubles
- Challenger Città di Lugano

Zizou Bergs and David Pel were the defending champions but chose not to defend their title.

Sander Arends and Sem Verbeek won the title after defeating Constantin Frantzen and Hendrik Jebens 6–7^{(9–11)}, 7–6^{(7–1)}, [10–8] in the final.

== Seeds ==
1. (Germany) Constantin Frantzen / (Germany) Hendrik Jebens (final)
2. (Netherlands) Sander Arends / (Netherlands) Sem Verbeek (champions)
3. (Poland) Karol Drzewiecki / (Finland) Patrik Niklas-Salminen (quarterfinals)
4. (United States) George Goldhoff / (Tunisia) Skander Mansouri (semifinals)

== Draw ==
Key

- Q = Qualifier
- WC = Wild card
- LL = Lucky loser
- Alt = Alternate
- ITF = ITF entry
- PR = Protected ranking
- SR = Special ranking
- SE = Special exempt
- JE = Junior exempt
- JR = Junior Accelerator Programme entrant
- CO = College Accelerator Programme entrant
- NG = Next Gen Accelerator Program entrant
- w/o = Walkover
- r = Retired
- d = Defaulted

First round
1	(Germany) C Frantzen (Germany) H Jebens	6	6
(Netherlands) G Brouwer (Switzerland) A Ritschard	4	4
(Sweden) A Göransson (Switzerland) M-A Hüsler	7	6
(Chinese Taipei) Y-h Hsu (Japan) Y Shimizu	5	3
3	(Poland) K Drzewiecki (Finland) P Niklas-Salminen	6	7^{7}
(France) T Arribagé (China) Y Bu	2	6^{3}
(France) G Mpetshi Perricard (France) L Sanchez	6	6^{11}	[6]
(Switzerland) L Margaroli (Germany) D Masur	3	7^{13}	[10]
(Sweden) F Bergevi (Netherlands) M Veldheer	6^{2}	6	[10]
(United States) C Harrison (United Kingdom) J Paris	7^{7}	4	[8]
WC	(Switzerland) M Brunold (Switzerland) Andrin Casanova	1	4
4	(United States) G Goldhoff (Tunisia) S Mansouri	6	6
(South Africa) L Harris (Poland) S Walków	5	2
(Japan) S Shimabukuro (Japan) Y Uchiyama	7	6
WC	(Switzerland) R Bertola (Switzerland) J Paul	4	3
2	(Netherlands) S Arends (Netherlands) S Verbeek	6	6

Quarterfinals
1	(Germany) C Frantzen (Germany) H Jebens	7^{7}	6
(Sweden) A Göransson (Switzerland) M-A Hüsler	6^{5}	4
3	(Poland) K Drzewiecki (Finland) P Niklas-Salminen	6^{4}	6	[9]
(Switzerland) L Margaroli (Germany) D Masur	7^{7}	4	[11]
(Sweden) F Bergevi (Netherlands) M Veldheer	3	7^{7}	[10]
4	(United States) G Goldhoff (Tunisia) S Mansouri	6	6^{5}	[12]
(Japan) S Shimabukuro (Japan) Y Uchiyama	2	3
2	(Netherlands) S Arends (Netherlands) S Verbeek	6	6

Semifinals
1	(Germany) C Frantzen (Germany) H Jebens	6	7^{7}
(Switzerland) L Margaroli (Germany) D Masur	4	6^{5}
4	(United States) G Goldhoff (Tunisia) S Mansouri	4	4
2	(Netherlands) S Arends (Netherlands) S Verbeek	6	6

Final
1	(Germany) C Frantzen (Germany) H Jebens	7^{11}	6^{1}	[8]
2	(Netherlands) S Arends (Netherlands) S Verbeek	6^{9}	7^{7}	[10]
