= 2022 Challenger Città di Lugano =

- Date: 28 March–4 April
- Edition: 2nd
- Surface: Hard (indoor)
- Location: Lugano, Switzerland

Champions

Singles
- (Italy) Luca Nardi

Doubles
- (Belgium) Ruben Bemelmans / (Germany) Daniel Masur
- Challenger Città di Lugano

The 2022 Challenger Città di Lugano was a professional tennis tournament played on indoor hard courts. It was the 2nd edition of the tournament which was part of the 2022 ATP Challenger Tour. It took place in Lugano, Switzerland between 28 March and 3 April 2022.

== Singles main-draw entrants ==
=== Seeds ===
Country	Player	Rank^{1}	Seed
USA	Maxime Cressy	72	1
MDA	Radu Albot	117	2
GER	Mats Moraing	125	3
FRA	Pierre-Hugues Herbert	134	4
BIH	Damir Džumhur	136	5
AUT	Dennis Novak	140	6
FRA	Hugo Grenier	154	7
SUI	Dominic Stricker	157	8

- ^{1} Rankings are as of 21 March 2022.

=== Other entrants ===
The following players received wildcards into the singles main draw:

- (Switzerland) Rémy Bertola
- (Switzerland) Kilian Feldbausch
- (Switzerland) Leandro Riedi

The following players received entry into the singles main draw as alternates:

- (Romania) Marius Copil
- (Italy) Luca Nardi

The following players received entry from the qualifying draw:

- (France) Dan Added
- (Netherlands) Gijs Brouwer
- (South Korea) Chung Yun-seong
- (Switzerland) Jérôme Kym
- (Bosnia and Herzegovina) Aldin Šetkić
- (Finland) Otto Virtanen

== Champions ==
=== Singles ===
- (Italy) Luca Nardi def. (Switzerland) Leandro Riedi 4–6, 6–2, 6–3.

=== Doubles ===
- (Belgium) Ruben Bemelmans / (Germany) Daniel Masur def. (Switzerland) Jérôme Kym / (Switzerland) Leandro Riedi 6–4, 6–7^{(5–7)}, [10–7].
