= 2021 Challenger Città di Lugano =

- Date: 22–28 March
- Edition: 1st
- Surface: Hard (indoor)
- Location: Lugano, Switzerland

Champions

Singles
- (Switzerland) Dominic Stricker

Doubles
- (Germany) Andre Begemann / (Italy) Andrea Vavassori
- Challenger Città di Lugano

The 2021 Challenger Città di Lugano was a professional tennis tournament played on indoor hard courts. It was the 1st edition of the tournament which was part of the 2021 ATP Challenger Tour. It took place in Lugano, Switzerland between 22 and 28 March 2021.

== Singles main-draw entrants ==
=== Seeds ===
Country	Player	Rank^{1}	Seed
JPN	Yūichi Sugita	108	1
RUS	Evgeny Donskoy	128	2
GER	Peter Gojowczyk	130	3
AUS	Marc Polmans	137	4
UKR	Illya Marchenko	169	5
RUS	Roman Safiullin	170	6
~~GER~~	~~Yannick Maden~~	~~186~~	~~7~~
ITA	Roberto Marcora	190	8

- ^{1} Rankings are as of 15 March 2021.

=== Other entrants ===
The following players received wildcards into the singles main draw:

- (Switzerland) Jérôme Kym
- (Switzerland) Leandro Riedi
- (Switzerland) Dominic Stricker

The following player received entry into the singles main draw as a special exempt:

- (Germany) Matthias Bachinger

The following players received entry into the singles main draw as alternates:

- (Turkey) Altuğ Çelikbilek
- (Austria) Lucas Miedler
- (United States) Jack Sock

The following players received entry from the qualifying draw:

- (Switzerland) Antoine Bellier
- (Italy) Francesco Forti
- (Ukraine) Vitaliy Sachko
- (Netherlands) Tim van Rijthoven

The following players received entry as lucky losers:

- (United Kingdom) Ryan Peniston
- (Netherlands) Jelle Sels

== Champions ==
=== Singles ===
- (Switzerland) Dominic Stricker def. (Ukraine) Vitaliy Sachko 6–4, 6–2.

=== Doubles ===
- (Germany) Andre Begemann / (Italy) Andrea Vavassori def. (Ukraine) Denys Molchanov / (Ukraine) Sergiy Stakhovsky 7–6^{(13–11)}, 4–6, [10–8].
