= 2024 Challenger Città di Lugano – Singles =

Singles
- 2024 Challenger Città di Lugano

Final
- Champion: (Finland) Otto Virtanen
- Runner-up: (Germany) Daniel Masur
- Score: 6–7^{(4–7)}, 6–4, 7–6^{(7–3)}

Events
Singles	Doubles
- Challenger Città di Lugano

Otto Virtanen was the defending champion and successfully defended his title after defeating Daniel Masur 6–7^{(4–7)}, 6–4, 7–6^{(7–3)} in the final.

== Seeds ==
1. (Belgium) Zizou Bergs (semifinals)
2. (Finland) Otto Virtanen (champion)
3. (Moldova) Radu Albot (quarterfinals)
4. (Switzerland) Leandro Riedi (first round)
5. (Kazakhstan) Mikhail Kukushkin (quarterfinals)
6. (France) Pierre-Hugues Herbert (quarterfinals)
7. (France) Giovanni Mpetshi Perricard (first round)
8. (United Kingdom) Jan Choinski (second round)

== Draw ==
Key

- Q = Qualifier
- WC = Wild card
- LL = Lucky loser
- Alt = Alternate
- ITF = ITF entry
- PR = Protected ranking
- SR = Special ranking
- SE = Special exempt
- JE = Junior exempt
- JR = Junior Accelerator Programme entrant
- CO = College Accelerator Programme entrant
- NG = Next Gen Accelerator Program entrant
- w/o = Walkover
- r = Retired
- d = Defaulted

=== Finals ===
Semifinals
1	(Belgium) Zizou Bergs	2	4
Q	(Germany) Daniel Masur	6	6
(Germany) Rudolf Molleker	1	3
2	(Finland) Otto Virtanen	6	6

Final
Q	(Germany) Daniel Masur	7^{7}	4	6^{3}
2	(Finland) Otto Virtanen	6^{4}	6	7^{7}

=== Top half ===
First round
1	(Belgium) Z Bergs	6	6
Alt	(Italy) S Travaglia	2	3
Q	(Germany) H Squire	7^{7}	6
WC	(Switzerland) M Brunold	6^{2}	4
(United Kingdom) B Harris	6^{7}	6	6
(Italy) M Bellucci	7^{9}	4	4
Q	(Chinese Taipei) Y-h Hsu	2	2
5/SE	(Kazakhstan) M Kukushkin	6	6
3	(Moldova) R Albot	6	6
(Switzerland) M-A Hüsler	4	3
(Switzerland) A Ritschard	4	6	6
Q	(Lithuania) R Berankis	6	1	4
Q	(France) A Géa	6	6
(South Africa) L Harris	4	3
Q	(Germany) D Masur	6	6
7	(France) G Mpetshi Perricard	4	4

Second round
1	(Belgium) Z Bergs	7^{7}	6
Q	(Germany) H Squire	6^{5}	2
(United Kingdom) B Harris	6	3	1
5/SE	(Kazakhstan) M Kukushkin	2	6	6
3	(Moldova) R Albot	1	6	6
(Switzerland) A Ritschard	6	4	4
Q	(France) A Géa	3	3
Q	(Germany) D Masur	6	6

Quarterfinals
1	(Belgium) Z Bergs	6	6
5/SE	(Kazakhstan) M Kukushkin	3	4
3	(Moldova) R Albot	6^{0}	6^{4}
Q	(Germany) D Masur	7^{7}	7^{7}

Semifinals
1	(Belgium) Z Bergs	2	4
Q	(Germany) D Masur	6	6

=== Bottom half ===
First round
8	(United Kingdom) J Choinski	3	6	6
SE	(Hong Kong) C Wong	6	3	4
(Germany) R Molleker	6	6
(Japan) S Shimabukuro	4	4
(Netherlands) G Brouwer	7	6
(France) U Blanchet	5	4
(Belgium) A Blockx	3	7^{8}	7
4	(Switzerland) L Riedi	6	6^{6}	5
6	(France) P-H Herbert	6	4	6
LL	(Japan) Y Shimizu	3	6	1
(China) Y Bu	4	0
(France) A Escoffier	6	6
Q	(Turkey) C İlkel	6	6
WC	(Switzerland) J Nikles	0	3
WC	(Switzerland) R Bertola	5	3
2	(Finland) O Virtanen	7	6

Second round
8	(United Kingdom) J Choinski	6^{5}	4
(Germany) R Molleker	7^{7}	6
(Netherlands) G Brouwer	6	6
(Belgium) A Blockx	3	1
6	(France) P-H Herbert	7^{7}	4	6
(France) A Escoffier	6^{3}	6	2
Q	(Turkey) C İlkel	2	1
2	(Finland) O Virtanen	6	6

Quarterfinals
(Germany) R Molleker	6	7^{7}
(Netherlands) G Brouwer	4	6^{4}
6	(France) P-H Herbert	3	2
2	(Finland) O Virtanen	6	6

Semifinals
(Germany) R Molleker	1	3
2	(Finland) O Virtanen	6	6
