= 2024 Challenger Città di Lugano =

- Date: 4–10 March
- Edition: 4th
- Surface: Hard (indoor)
- Location: Lugano, Switzerland

Champions

Singles
- (Finland) Otto Virtanen

Doubles
- (Netherlands) Sander Arends / (Netherlands) Sem Verbeek
- Challenger Città di Lugano

The 2024 Challenger Città di Lugano, known as 4° Città di Lugano, was a professional tennis tournament played on indoor hard courts. It was the 4th edition of the tournament which was part of the 2024 ATP Challenger Tour. It took place in Lugano, Switzerland between 4 and 10 March 2024.

== Singles main-draw entrants ==
=== Seeds ===
Country	Player	Rank^{1}	Seed
BEL	Zizou Bergs	123	1
FIN	Otto Virtanen	131	2
MDA	Radu Albot	152	3
SUI	Leandro Riedi	160	4
KAZ	Mikhail Kukushkin	165	5
FRA	Pierre-Hugues Herbert	166	6
FRA	Giovanni Mpetshi Perricard	170	7
GBR	Jan Choinski	173	8

- ^{1} Rankings are as of 26 February 2024.

=== Other entrants ===
The following players received wildcards into the singles main draw:

- (Switzerland) Rémy Bertola
- (Switzerland) Mika Brunold
- (Switzerland) Johan Nikles

The following players received entry into the singles main draw as special exempts:

- (Kazakhstan) Mikhail Kukushkin
- (Hong Kong) Coleman Wong

The following player received entry into the singles main draw as an alternate:

- (Italy) Stefano Travaglia

The following players received entry from the qualifying draw:

- (Lithuania) Ričardas Berankis
- (France) Arthur Géa
- (Chinese Taipei) Hsu Yu-hsiou
- (Turkey) Cem İlkel
- (Germany) Daniel Masur
- (Germany) Henri Squire

The following player received entry as a lucky loser:

- (Japan) Yuta Shimizu

== Champions ==
=== Singles ===
- (Finland) Otto Virtanen def. (Germany) Daniel Masur 6–7^{(4–7)}, 6–4, 7–6^{(7–3)}.

=== Doubles ===
- (Netherlands) Sander Arends / (Netherlands) Sem Verbeek def. (Germany) Constantin Frantzen / (Germany) Hendrik Jebens 6–7^{(9–11)}, 7–6^{(7–1)}, [10–8].
