= Sergiy Stakhovsky =

Ukrainian tennis player (born 1986)

- Сергій Стаховський
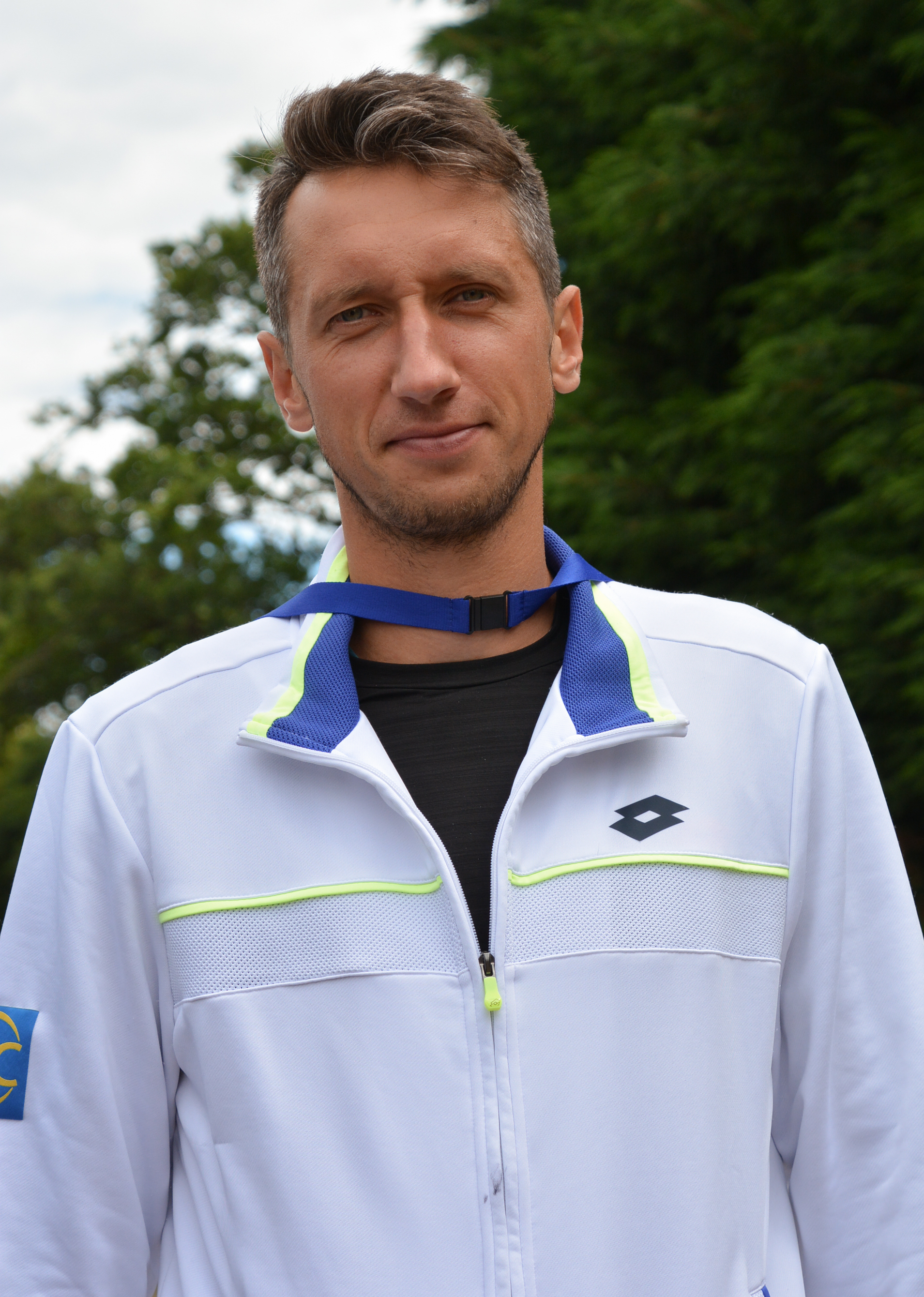
- Stakhovsky in 2017
- Born: January 6, 1986 (age 40); Kyiv, Ukrainian SSR, Soviet Union (now Ukraine)
- Tennis career
- Country (sports): Ukraine
- Residence: Budapest, Hungary
- Height: 1.93 m (6 ft 4 in)
- Turned pro: 2003
- Retired: 2022
- Plays: Right-handed (one-handed backhand)
- Coach: Tibor Toth (2007–2014); Fabrice Santoro (2014–2016); Burghard Riehemann
- Prize money: US$ 5,588,638
- Official website: stakhovskywines.com

Singles
- Career record: 177–215
- Career titles: 4
- Highest ranking: No. 31 (27 September 2010)

Grand Slam singles results
- Australian Open: 3R (2011)
- French Open: 3R (2011)
- Wimbledon: 3R (2013, 2014)
- US Open: 3R (2010, 2015)

Doubles
- Career record: 81–102
- Career titles: 4
- Highest ranking: No. 33 (6 June 2011)

Grand Slam doubles results
- Australian Open: 3R (2013)
- French Open: 2R (2009, 2010, 2011)
- Wimbledon: 3R (2010)
- US Open: 3R (2010, 2011, 2013)
- Military career
- Allegiance: Ukraine
- Branch: Ukrainian Army
- Service years: 2022–present
- Conflicts: Russo-Ukrainian War; Russian invasion of Ukraine; Battle of Bakhmut

Sergiy Eduardovych Stakhovsky (Ukrainian: Сергій Едуардович Стаховський, pronounced [serˈɦij stɐˈxɔu̯sʲkɪj]; born January 6, 1986) is a Ukrainian former professional tennis player. Stakhovsky turned professional in 2003 and played mostly at the Challenger level from 2005 to 2008. His career-high rankings were World No. 31 in singles (September 2010) and No. 33 in doubles (June 2011).

Stakhovsky won his first career title in March 2008, as a lucky loser ranked No. 209, defeating top seed Ivan Ljubičić in the final, thus becoming the first lucky loser to win a title since Christian Miniussi in 1991. He is perhaps best known for defeating eight-time winner and defending champion Roger Federer in the second round of the 2013 Wimbledon Championships, ending the latter's record run of 36 consecutive major quarterfinals.

He is the elder brother of tennis player Leonard Stakhovsky. He was coached by Burghard Riehemann. Stakhovsky retired from tennis in January 2022, and following the Russian invasion of Ukraine he joined the Ukrainian Army.

== Junior career ==
Stakhovsky reached career-high world rankings of No. 28 in singles and No. 32 in doubles in 2003. In 2004, he had his best junior result, losing in the final of the US Open to Andy Murray, beating Donald Young in the first round. In 2002, he beat Novak Djokovic in the quarterfinals of Luxembourg, before losing to Dudi Sela in the final.

== Professional career ==
=== 2004 ===
Stakhovsky played his first ATP-level singles match in October in Moscow's Kremlin Cup. After beating Alejandro Falla in qualifying to reach the main draw, he lost to Nikolay Davydenko in the first round. He then reached the quarterfinals of a couple Challengers to finish the year ranked No. 335 in singles.

=== 2005 ===
Stakhovsky began 2005 where he left off, qualifying into the ATP stop in Qatar in January and losing to Lee Hyung-taik in the first round. In February, he won his first ATP-level singles match, qualifying into the main draw, where he beat No. 100 Christophe Rochus and No. 29 Mario Ančić before losing to No. 37 Robin Söderling in the quarterfinals. He spent most of the rest of the year having moderate success at the Challenger level, but did qualify once more into an ATP tournament in Russia in October, reaching the second round. He finished the year ranked No. 173 in singles.

In doubles, he won two Challenger tournaments, in Spain in July and Prague in November.

=== 2006 ===
Stakhovsky had a rough start to the year, losing in the first round of qualifying at three straight ATP stops. By May, his ranking had slipped back to No. 260 before he began making progress again on the Challenger Tour. Semifinal results at major Challengers in Spain and Istanbul in July got his ranking back to No. 181.

In October, he qualified into ATP main draws two weeks in a row, losing in the first round to No. 26 Richard Gasquet in France and beating No. 21 Dmitry Tursunov in the first round in Moscow before losing to No. 54 Arnaud Clément. That brought his singles ranking to a career high of No. 158.

Although he did win his fourth career doubles Challenger title in Ukraine in November, he had no further singles success and finished the year ranked No. 198 in singles.

=== 2007 ===
Stakhovsky was not as successful in 2007 in singles. He qualified twice into ATP Tour main draws in January and February, but lost in the first round. He had more success in doubles, winning two more Challenger titles to get to a career-high doubles ranking of No. 128 in August. But by October, his singles ranking had slipped to No. 294 before he began making progress on the Challenger Tour again. He reached his first Challenger singles final in Malaysia in his final tournament of 2007 to finish the year ranked No. 199 in singles.

=== 2008: First ATP Tour title ===
Stakhovsky began 2008 by failing to qualify into several ATP and Challenger tournaments, before qualifying and reaching the quarterfinals of a major Challenger in Poland in February, losing to No. 68 Simone Bolelli. He then entered qualifying of the Zagreb Indoors, losing in the final round to Slovenian Blaž Kavčič, but due to Michaël Llodra's withdrawal, he entered the main draw as a lucky loser. He went on to win the tournament, defeating top players along the way, including No. 2 seed Ivo Karlović in the first round, eighth seed Janko Tipsarević in the quarterfinals, Simone Bolelli in the semifinals, and top seed Ivan Ljubičić in the final.

=== 2009: Second ATP title ===
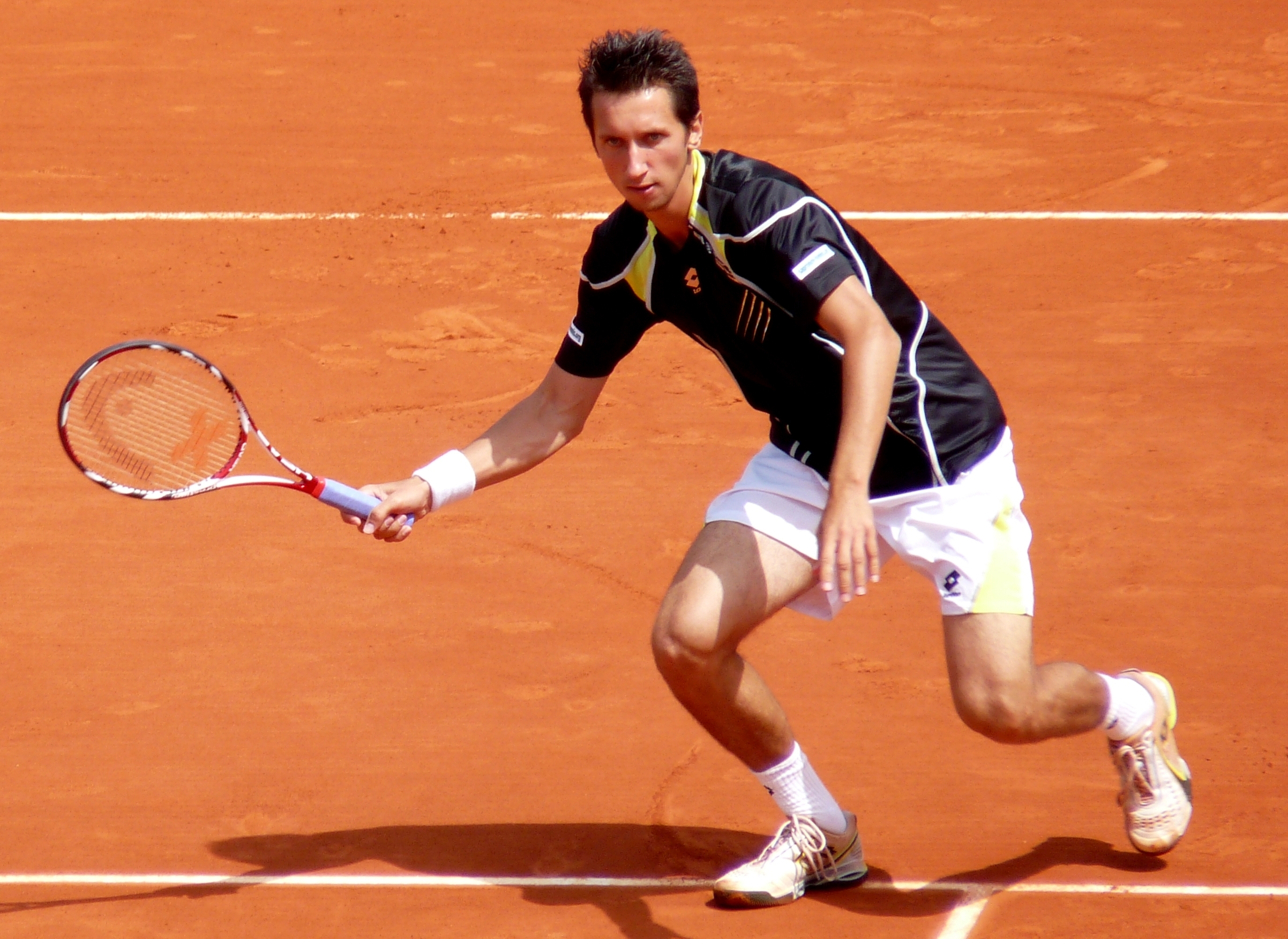
Sergiy Stakhovsky at the 2009 French Open

This year has seen Stakhovsky match it with the best in a number of ATP World Tour events. In the season opener in Doha, Stakhovsky lost in the quarterfinals to third seed Andy Murray. In Zagreb, as defending champion, he once again made the quarterfinals, losing to Viktor Troicki. Stakhovsky played Andy Murray once more in the first round of the Dubai Tennis Championships and, after being one set up and with a break in the second, he twisted his ankle whilst trying to volley. Unable to finish the match, Stakhovsky retired hurt.

As the leading player in the Ukrainian Davis Cup team, Stakhovsky defeated Chris Eaton on the opening day of the Europe/Africa Zone Playoff versus Great Britain in Scotland and partnered Sergei Bubka Jr. in closing out the tie by winning the doubles in five sets.

Stakhovsky won his maiden Grand Slam singles and doubles matches at Roland Garros. Stakhovsky qualified for the main draw with impressive performances in his three qualifying matches, coming from 1–4 down in the third set versus Rik de Voest to record an 8–6 victory. Playing Brian Dabul of Argentina in the first round of the main draw, Stakhovsky recorded a four set victory and set up a meeting with Novak Djokovic, the fourth seed. In a match lasting two days due to poor light, Stakhovsky was comprehensively defeated by the 2007 and 2008 semifinalist in three sets. Partnering James Cerretani in the doubles, the pair won their first round match, before eventually losing to the eventual champions, Lukáš Dlouhý and Leander Paes.

Stakhovsky won his second career title in St. Petersburg, after winning epic matches against former world No. 1, two time Grand Slam champion and twice St. Petersburg Open champion, Marat Safin (who was playing his last St. Petersburg Open), and he narrowly defeated Horacio Zeballos in the final.

=== 2010: Top 40 ===
Stakhovsky continued his good form in Davis Cup play with two victories in Ukraine's tie against Latvia in the first round Europe/Africa Zone 1 tie. He also won his third career title, beating Janko Tipsarević in the final of the UNICEF Open – a tournament Stakhovsky did not receive a seeding for. At New Haven, he won his fourth career title with highlight wins over Tommy Robredo and Marcos Baghdatis, becoming the first Ukrainian to win two titles in a season since Andrei Medvedev in 1994.

At the 2010 US Open, after knocking out Australian Peter Luczak in the first round, Stakhovsky battled into the third round with a five-set win over American qualifier Ryan Harrison, coming back from triple match point down in a fifth-set tiebreaker to win a match marked by dramatic serve-and-volleying, rallies at net, and leaping overheads from both players. In the third round, Sergiy retired in the second set trailing Feliciano López with an infected toe.

Sergiy reached a career high ranking of No. 31 on 27 September 2010. He ended the 2010 season ranked No. 46 and would begin 2011 at the Qatar Open in Doha.

=== 2011: French Open seeding and third round ===
He was the 31st seed (only time he has been seeded in a major) in the 2011 French Open, he faced David Guez who he beat in four sets he then beat future US Open finalist Kei Nishikori. However, his run was stopped when he faced David Ferrer where he lost in straight sets.

=== 2012: First Olympics ===
Stakhovsky represented Ukraine at the 2012 Summer Olympics, losing in the first round of the men's singles to Lleyton Hewitt.

=== 2013: First top-10 win over Roger Federer and Wimbledon third round ===
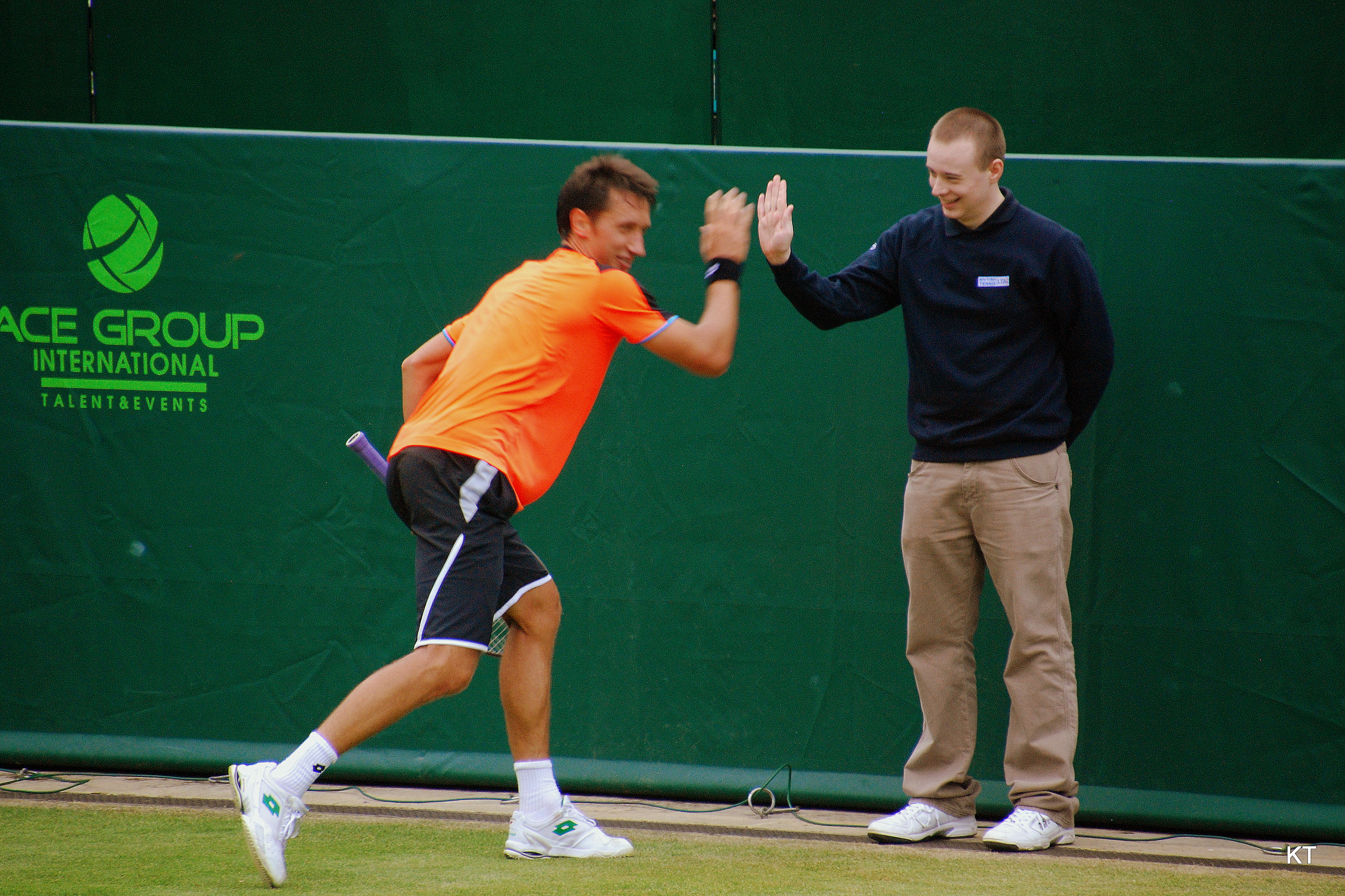
Sergiy Stakhovsky in 2013

He got his first top-10 win when he defeated seven-time winner and defending champion Roger Federer at Wimbledon in four sets in the second round, to give Federer his earliest Grand Slam defeat since the 2003 French Open. This ended Federer's run of 36 consecutive Grand Slam events where he had reached at least the quarterfinals. Stakhovsky was ranked 116 at the time, and Federer was ranked No. 3. Stakhovsky subsequently lost to Jürgen Melzer in the third round, going down in four sets.

=== 2022: Retirement ===
After his first round qualifying loss to J. J. Wolf at the Australian Open, Stakhovsky announced his retirement from professional tennis after 19 years.

== Return to Ukraine ==
During the 2022 Russian invasion of Ukraine, Stakhovsky returned to Ukraine on 27 February to help defend the country, joining the Ukrainian Army. At the beginning of the war Stakhovsky joined a unit of the special forces of Ukraine. In February 2023, he took part in the Battle of Bakhmut.

In Ukraine, Stakhovsky was interviewed by Australian journalist Sarah Ferguson for Four Corners. Armed and in uniform, he explained that he was fighting to protect his two young sons who lived in Hungary only 300 kilometres (190 mi) from the border of Ukraine. He believes that if (Russian President) Putin is not stopped in Ukraine, that he would continue further into Europe.

== Personal life ==
Stakhovsky was married to Russian-Hungarian beauty coach Anfisa Bulgakova; they are now divorced. He has three children and has lived in Budapest in Hungary since 2014. Since 2018, he has been a winemaker with his own growing area in the region of Carpathian Ukraine in the west of the country in the border area with Hungary, Slovakia and Romania.

== Performance timelines ==
Key
W	F	SF	QF	#R	RR	Q#	P#	DNQ	A	Z#	PO	G	S	B	NMS	NTI	P	NH

(W) winner; (F) finalist; (SF) semifinalist; (QF) quarterfinalist; (#R) rounds 4, 3, 2, 1; (RR) round-robin stage; (Q#) qualification round; (P#) preliminary round; (DNQ) did not qualify; (A) absent; (Z#) Davis/Fed Cup Zonal Group (with number indication) or (PO) play-off; (G) gold, (S) silver or (B) bronze Olympic/Paralympic medal; (NMS) not a Masters tournament; (NTI) not a Tier I tournament; (P) postponed; (NH) not held; (SR) strike rate (events won / competed); (W–L) win–loss record.
To avoid confusion and double counting, these charts are updated at the conclusion of a tournament or when the player's participation has ended.

=== Singles ===
Tournament	2003	2004	2005	2006	2007	2008	2009	2010	2011	2012	2013	2014	2015	2016	2017	2018	2019	2020	2021	2022	SR	W–L	Win%
Grand Slam tournaments
Australian Open	A	A	A	A	Q2	Q3	1R	1R	3R	2R	1R	1R	2R	1R	A	Q1	Q2	Q2	1R	Q1	0 / 9	4–9	33%
French Open	A	A	Q1	A	Q3	Q2	2R	1R	3R	2R	1R	1R	2R	Q2	2R	2R	1R	Q1	Q2	A	0 / 10	7–10	44%
Wimbledon	A	A	Q3	A	Q3	1R	Q1	1R	2R	1R	3R	3R	1R	2R	2R	2R	Q2	NH	Q2	A	0 / 10	8–10	44%
US Open	A	A	Q2	A	Q1	Q3	1R	3R	1R	1R	1R	1R	3R	2R	Q3	Q1	Q1	A	Q1	A	0 / 8	5–8	39%
Win–loss	0–0	0–0	0–0	0–0	0–0	0–1	1–3	2–4	5–4	2–4	2–4	2–4	4–4	2–3	2–2	2–2	0–1	0–0	0–1	0–0	0 / 37	24–37	41%
ATP Masters 1000
Indian Wells Masters	A	A	A	A	A	A	2R	2R	A	2R	Q2	2R	2R	A	Q1	Q2	A	NH	A	A	0 / 5	5–5	50%
Miami Masters	A	A	A	A	A	A	1R	3R	2R	1R	Q1	1R	1R	2R	Q2	Q2	A	NH	A	A	0 / 7	4–7	36%
Monte Carlo Masters	A	A	A	A	A	A	A	A	1R	Q1	Q2	Q1	2R	A	Q2	Q2	A	NH	A	A	0 / 2	1–2	33%
Madrid Masters	A	A	A	A	A	A	A	A	3R	1R	Q2	Q1	Q1	A	A	A	A	NH	A	A	0 / 2	2–2	50%
Rome Masters	A	A	A	A	A	A	A	A	2R	Q1	A	A	A	A	A	A	A	A	A	A	0 / 1	1–1	50%
Canada Masters	A	A	A	A	A	A	A	2R	2R	1R	A	A	2R	A	A	A	A	NH	A	A	0 / 4	3–4	43%
Cincinnati Masters	A	A	A	A	A	A	A	1R	1R	1R	A	A	1R	A	A	A	A	A	A	A	0 / 4	0–4	0%
Shanghai Masters	NMS						A	1R	A	Q2	A	A	A	A	Q1	A	A	NH			0 / 1	0–1	0%
Paris Masters	A	A	A	A	A	A	Q2	2R	2R	A	A	Q2	Q1	A	A	A	A	A	A	A	0 / 2	2–2	50%
Win–loss	0–0	0–0	0–0	0–0	0–0	0–0	1–2	5–6	6–7	1–5	0–0	1–2	3–5	1–1	0–0	0–0	0–0	0–0	0–0	0–0	0 / 28	18–28	39%
Career statistics
	2003	2004	2005	2006	2007	2008	2009	2010	2011	2012	2013	2014	2015	2016	2017	2018	2019	2020	2021	2022	Career		
Tournaments	0	1	3	2	2	5	14	26	26	27	15	19	25	13	8	5	6	1	2	0	200		
Titles	0	0	0	0	0	1	1	2	0	0	0	0	0	0	0	0	0	0	0	0	4		
Finals	0	0	0	0	0	1	1	2	0	0	0	0	0	0	0	0	0	0	0	0	4		
Overall win–loss	0–0	0–1	3–3	1–6	2–3	9–4	16–14	27–25	25–27	16–28	11–17	20–20	20–27	8–14	6–8	5–6	3–6	1–2	2–4	0–0	4 / 200	177–215	45%
Year-end ranking	533	335	184	195	199	92	60	46	62	103	98	58	62	109	122	134	150	202	216	–	45.15%		

=== Doubles ===
Tournament	2008	2009	2010	2011	2012	2013	2014	2015	2016	SR	W–L	Win%
Grand Slam tournaments
Australian Open	A	1R	1R	2R	1R	3R	A	1R	1R	0 / 7	3–7	30%
French Open	A	2R	2R	2R	1R	1R	A	1R	A	0 / 6	3–6	33%
Wimbledon	Q1	Q1	3R	2R	1R	A	1R	1R	1R	0 / 6	3–6	33%
US Open	A	1R	3R	3R	2R	3R	A	2R	1R	0 / 7	8–7	53%
Win–loss	0–0	1–3	5–4	5–4	1–4	4–3	0–1	1–4	0–3	0 / 26	17–26	40%

== ATP Tour finals ==
=== Singles: 4 (4 titles) ===
Legend Grand Slam (0–0) ATP Masters 1000 (0–0) ATP 500 Series (0–0) ATP 250 Series (4–0)	Finals by surface Hard (3–0) Grass (1–0)	Finals by setting Outdoor (2–0) Indoor (2–0)

Result	W–L	Date	Tournament	Tier	Surface	Opponent	Score
Win	1–0	Mar 2008	Zagreb Indoors, Croatia	International	Hard (i)	(Croatia) Ivan Ljubičić	7–5, 6–4
Win	2–0	Nov 2009	St. Petersburg Open, Russia	250 Series	Hard (i)	(Argentina) Horacio Zeballos	2–6, 7–6^{(10–8)}, 7–6^{(9–7)}
Win	3–0	Jun 2010	Rosmalen Championships, Netherlands	250 Series	Grass	(Serbia) Janko Tipsarević	6–3, 6–0
Win	4–0	Aug 2010	Connecticut Open, US	250 Series	Hard	(Uzbekistan) Denis Istomin	3–6, 6–3, 6–4

=== Doubles: 4 (4 titles) ===
Legend Grand Slam (0–0) ATP Masters 1000 (0–0) ATP 500 Series (1–0) ATP 250 Series (3–0)	Finals by surface Hard (2–0) Grass (2–0)	Finals by setting Outdoor (3–0) Indoor (1–0)

Result	W–L	Date	Tournament	Tier	Surface	Partner	Opponents	Score
Win	1–0	Oct 2008	Kremlin Cup, Russia	International	Hard (i)	(Italy) Potito Starace	(Australia) Stephen Huss (United Kingdom) Ross Hutchins	7–6^{(7–4)}, 2–6, [10–6]
Win	2–0	Jun 2010	Halle Open, Germany	250 Series	Grass	(Russia) Mikhail Youzhny	(Czech Republic) Martin Damm (Slovakia) Filip Polášek	4–6, 7–5, [10–7]
Win	3–0	Feb 2011	Dubai Championships, UAE	500 Series	Hard	(Russia) Mikhail Youzhny	(France) Jérémy Chardy (Spain) Feliciano López	4–6, 6–3, [10–3]
Win	4–0	Jul 2019	Hall of Fame Open, US	250 Series	Grass	(Spain) Marcel Granollers	(El Salvador) Marcelo Arévalo (Mexico) Miguel Ángel Reyes-Varela	6–7^{(10–12)}, 6–4, [13–11]

== Records ==
- These records were attained in the Open era of tennis.

Tournament	Year	Record accomplished	Player tied
Zagreb	2008	Winning an ATP tournament as lucky loser	Heinz Gunthardt; Bill Scanlon; Francisco Clavet; Christian Miniussi; Rajeev Ram; Leonardo Mayer; Andrey Rublev; Marco Cecchinato; Kwon Soon-woo

== ATP Challenger and ITF Futures finals ==
=== Singles: 16 (7–9) ===
Legend ATP Challenger Tour (7–8) ITF Futures Tour (0–1)	Finals by surface Hard (6–7) Clay (0–2) Grass (1–0)

Result	W–L	Date	Tournament	Tier	Surface	Opponent	Score
Loss	0–1	Jun 2004	Ukraine F1, Dnipropetrovsk	Futures	Clay	(Slovakia) Viktor Bruthans	4–6, 1–6
Loss	0–2	Nov 2007	Kuala Lumpur, Malaysia	Challenger	Hard	(Germany) Rainer Schüttler	6–7^{(2–7)}, 2–6
Loss	0–3	Jul 2008	Penza, Russia	Challenger	Hard	(Germany) Benedikt Dorsch	6–1, 4–6, 6–7^{(6–8)}
Win	1–3	Aug 2008	Segovia, Spain	Challenger	Hard	(Brazil) Thiago Alves	7–5, 7–6^{(7–4)}
Loss	1–4	Oct 2009	Mons, Belgium	Challenger	Hard (i)	(Serbia) Janko Tipsarević	6–7^{(4–7)}, 3–6
Loss	1–5	Jun 2012	Fürth, Germany	Challenger	Clay	(Slovenia) Blaž Kavčič	3–6, 6–2, 2–6
Loss	1–6	Mar 2013	Le Gosier, Guadeloupe	Challenger	Hard	(France) Benoît Paire	4–6, 7–5, 4–6
Win	2–6	Aug 2013	Kazan, Russia	Challenger	Hard	(Russia) Valery Rudnev	6–2, 6–3
Win	3–6	Jul 2014	Binghamton, US	Challenger	Hard	(United States) Wayne Odesnik	6–4, 7–6^{(11–9)}
Win	4–6	Sep 2014	Orléans, France	Challenger	Hard (i)	(Brazil) Thomaz Bellucci	6–2, 7–5
Loss	4–7	Oct 2014	Tashkent, Uzbekistan	Challenger	Hard	(Slovakia) Lukáš Lacko	2–6, 3–6
Loss	4–8	Sep 2015	Istanbul, Turkey	Challenger	Hard	(Russia) Karen Khachanov	6–4, 4–6, 3–6
Win	5–8	May 2016	Seoul, Korea Rep.	Challenger	Hard	(Chinese Taipei) Lu Yen-hsun	4–6, 6–3, 7–6^{(9–7)}
Win	6–8	Aug 2017	Portorož, Slovenia	Challenger	Hard	(Italy) Matteo Berrettini	6–7^{(4–7)}, 7–6^{(8–6)}, 6–3
Win	7–8	Jun 2018	Ilkley Trophy, UK	Challenger	Grass	(Germany) Oscar Otte	6–4, 6–4
Loss	7–9	Apr 2019	Taipei, Taiwan	Challenger	Hard (i)	(Austria) Dennis Novak	2–6, 4–6

=== Doubles: 36 (19–17) ===
Legend ATP Challenger Tour (19–16) ITF Futures Tour (0–1)	Finals by surface Hard (12–10) Clay (6–7) Carpet (1–0)

Result	W–L	Date	Tournament	Tier	Surface	Partner	Opponents	Score
Loss	0–1	Apr 2003	Uzbekistan F2, Gulistan	Futures	Hard	(Czech Republic) Jiří Vencl	(Czech Republic) Petr Dezort (Czech Republic) Jaroslav Levinský	2–6, 2–6
Win	1–1	Aug 2003	Samarkand, Uzbekistan	Challenger	Clay	(Slovakia) Viktor Bruthans	(Russia) Pavel Ivanov (Serbia and Montenegro) Darko Mađarovski	6–2, 6–4
Loss	1–2	Sep 2003	Donetsk, Ukraine	Challenger	Hard	(Russia) Andrei Stoliarov	(India) Harsh Mankad (United States) Jason Marshall	2–6, 4–6
Win	2–2	Mar 2005	Sarajevo, Bosnia and Herzegovina	Challenger	Hard (i)	(Slovakia) Michal Mertiňák	(Czech Republic) Lukáš Dlouhý (Czech Republic) Jan Vacek	6–7^{(8–10)}, 6–2, 6–2
Win	3–2	Jul 2005	Córdoba, Spain	Challenger	Hard	(Belarus) Vladimir Voltchkov	(France) Nicolas Mahut (Luxembourg) Gilles Müller	7–5, 5–7, 6–1
Win	4–2	Nov 2005	Prague, Czech Republic	Challenger	Carpet (i)	(Slovakia) Filip Polášek	(United Kingdom) James Auckland (Netherlands) Jasper Smit	6–3, 3–6, 7–6^{(7–5)}
Win	5–2	Nov 2006	Dnipropetrovsk, Ukraine	Challenger	Hard (i)	(Ukraine) Orest Tereshchuk	(Switzerland) Marco Chiudinelli (Croatia) Lovro Zovko	6–4, 6–0
Win	6–2	Mar 2007	Fes, Morocco	Challenger	Clay	(Ukraine) Orest Tereshchuk	(Morocco) Rabie Chaki (Morocco) Mounir El Aarej	6–3, 6–3
Loss	6–3	Apr 2007	Bermuda Open	Challenger	Clay	(Germany) Benedikt Dorsch	(Brazil) Marcelo Melo (Brazil) André Sá	2–6, 4–6
Win	7–3	Jul 2007	Recanati, Italy	Challenger	Hard	(Italy) Fabio Colangelo	(China) Yu Xinyuan (China) Zeng Shaoxuan	1–6, 7–6^{(7–3)}, [10–7]
Win	8–3	May 2008	Ostrava, Czech Republic	Challenger	Clay	(Czech Republic) Tomáš Zíb	(Czech Republic) Jan Hernych (Slovakia) Igor Zelenay	7–6^{(8–6)}, 3–6, [14–12]
Loss	8–4	May 2008	Zagreb Open, Croatia	Challenger	Clay	(Czech Republic) Tomáš Zíb	(Croatia) Ivan Dodig (Brazil) Júlio Silva	4–6, 6–7^{(1–7)}
Loss	8–5	Sep 2008	Cherkassy, Ukraine	Challenger	Clay	(Ukraine) Sergei Bubka	(Russia) Mikhail Elgin (Russia) Alexander Krasnorutskiy	4–6, 5–7
Win	9–5	Sep 2008	Orléans, France	Challenger	Hard (i)	(Croatia) Lovro Zovko	(Switzerland) Jean-Claude Scherrer (Slovakia) Igor Zelenay	7–6^{(9–7)}, 6–4
Loss	9–6	Aug 2009	Segovia, Spain	Challenger	Hard	(Croatia) Lovro Zovko	(France) Nicolas Mahut (France) Édouard Roger-Vasselin	7–6^{(7–4)}, 3–6, [8–10]
Loss	9–7	Sep 2009	Alphen, Netherlands	Challenger	Clay	(Ukraine) Sergei Bubka	(United Kingdom) Jonathan Marray (United Kingdom) Jamie Murray	1–6, 4–6
Win	10–7	Sep 2013	Orléans, France	Challenger	Hard (i)	(Ukraine) Illya Marchenko	(Lithuania) Ričardas Berankis (Croatia) Franko Škugor	7–5, 6–3
Win	11–7	May 2014	Bordeaux, France	Challenger	Clay	(France) Marc Gicquel	(United States) Ryan Harrison (United States) Alex Kuznetsov	w/o
Loss	11–8	Jul 2014	Binghamton, US	Challenger	Hard	(Romania) Marius Copil	(United Kingdom) Daniel Cox (United Kingdom) Daniel Smethurst	7–6^{(7–3)}, 2–6, [6–10]
Win	12–8	Mar 2015	Irving, US	Challenger	Hard	(Sweden) Robert Lindstedt	(Germany) Benjamin Becker (Germany) Philipp Petzschner	6–4, 6–4
Loss	12–9	May 2015	Bordeaux, France	Challenger	Clay	(France) Lucas Pouille	(Netherlands) Thiemo de Bakker (Netherlands) Robin Haase	3–6, 5–7
Win	13–9	Oct 2016	Ningbo, China	Challenger	Hard	(France) Jonathan Eysseric	(United States) Stefan Kozlov (Japan) Akira Santillan	6–4, 7–6^{(7–4)}
Win	14–9	May 2017	Karshi, Uzbekistan	Challenger	Hard	(Ukraine) Denys Molchanov	(Germany) Kevin Krawietz (Spain) Adrián Menéndez Maceiras	6–4, 7–6^{(9–7)}
Win	15–9	Aug 2017	Segovia, Spain	Challenger	Hard	(Spain) Adrián Menéndez Maceiras	(Spain) Roberto Ortega Olmedo (Spain) David Vega Hernández	4–6, 6–3, [10–7]
Loss	15–10	Sep 2017	İzmir, Turkey	Challenger	Hard	(Ukraine) Denys Molchanov	(United Kingdom) Scott Clayton (United Kingdom) Jonny O'Mara	w/o
Loss	15–11	May 2018	Ostrava, Czech Republic	Challenger	Clay	(Czech Republic) Lukáš Rosol	(Hungary) Attila Balázs (Portugal) Gonçalo Oliveira	0–6, 5–7
Win	16–11	Sep 2018	Cassis, France	Challenger	Hard	(Australia) Matt Reid	(Switzerland) Marc-Andrea Hüsler (Portugal) Gonçalo Oliveira	6–2, 6–3
Loss	16–12	May 2019	Seoul, Korea Rep.	Challenger	Hard	(Belgium) Ruben Bemelmans	(Australia) Max Purcell (Australia) Luke Saville	4–6, 6–7^{(7–9)}
Loss	16–13	March 2021	Biella, Italy	Challenger	Hard (i)	(Ukraine) Denys Molchanov	(France) Quentin Halys (France) Tristan Lamasine	1–6, 0–2 ret.
Loss	16–14	March 2021	Biella, Italy	Challenger	Hard (i)	(Ukraine) Denys Molchanov	(United Kingdom) Lloyd Glasspool (Australia) Matt Reid	3–6, 4–6
Loss	16–15	March 2021	Lugano, Switzerland	Challenger	Hard (i)	(Ukraine) Denys Molchanov	(Germany) Andre Begemann (Italy) Andrea Vavassori	6–7^{(11–13)}, 6–4, [8–10]
Win	17–15	May 2021	Ostrava, Czech Republic	Challenger	Clay	(Australia) Marc Polmans	(Czech Republic) Andrew Paulson (Czech Republic) Patrik Rikl	7–6^{(7–4)}, 3–6, [10–7]
Win	18–15	May 2021	Prague, Czech Republic	Challenger	Clay	(Australia) Marc Polmans	(Croatia) Ivan Sabanov (Croatia) Matej Sabanov	6–3, 6–4
Loss	18–16	Jul 2021	Nur-Sultan, Kazakhstan	Challenger	Hard	(Canada) Peter Polansky	(Chinese Taipei) Hsu Yu-hsiou (Zimbabwe) Benjamin Lock	6–2, 1–6, [7–10]
Loss	18–17	Sep 2021	Kyiv, Ukraine	Challenger	Clay	(Ukraine) Denys Molchanov	(Brazil) Orlando Luz (Kazakhstan) Aleksandr Nedovyesov	4–6, 4–6
Win	19–17	Nov 2021	Bratislava, Slovakia	Challenger	Hard (i)	(Slovakia) Filip Horanský	(Ukraine) Denys Molchanov (Kazakhstan) Aleksandr Nedovyesov	6–4, 6–4

== Top 10 wins per season ==
- He has a 3–35 record against players who were, at the time the match was played, ranked in the top 10.

Season	2013	2014	2015	Total
Wins	1	1	1	3

#	Player	Rank	Tournament	Surface	Rd	Score
2013
1.	(Switzerland) Roger Federer	3	Wimbledon, UK	Grass	2R	6–7^{(5–7)}, 7–6^{(7–5)}, 7–5, 7–6^{(7–5)}
2014
2.	(Latvia) Ernests Gulbis	10	Wimbledon, UK	Grass	2R	6–4, 6–3, 7–6^{(7–5)}
2015
3.	(Switzerland) Stan Wawrinka	7	Marseille, France	Hard (i)	QF	6–4, 3–6, 6–4
