= 2026 Challenger Città di Lugano =

- Date: 23 February – 1 March
- Edition: 6th
- Surface: Hard (indoor)
- Location: Lugano, Switzerland

Champions

Singles
- (Hungary) Zsombor Piros

Doubles
- (Serbia) Stefan Latinović / (Ukraine) Vitaliy Sachko
- Challenger Città di Lugano

The 2026 Challenger Città di Lugano was a professional tennis tournament played on indoor hardcourts. It was the sixth edition of the tournament which was part of the 2026 ATP Challenger Tour. It took place in Lugano, Switzerland between 23 February and 1 March 2026.

== Singles main-draw entrants ==
=== Seeds ===
Country	Player	Rank^{1}	Seed
NOR	Nicolai Budkov Kjær	133	1
EST	Daniil Glinka	171	2
HUN	Zsombor Piros	178	3
UKR	Vitaliy Sachko	181	4
~~USA~~	~~Nishesh Basavareddy~~	~~192~~	~~5~~
FRA	Hugo Grenier	193	6
KAZ	Timofey Skatov	195	7
DEN	August Holmgren	199	8

- ^{1} Rankings are as of 16 February 2026.

=== Other entrants ===
The following players received wildcards into the singles main draw:

- (Switzerland) Henry Bernet
- (Switzerland) Mika Brunold
- (Switzerland) Dominic Stricker

The following player received entry into the singles main draw through the Next Gen Accelerator programme:

- (Czech Republic) Maxim Mrva

The following players received entry from the qualifying draw:

- (Bosnia and Herzegovina) Mirza Bašić
- (Czech Republic) Petr Brunclík
- (Switzerland) Dylan Dietrich
- (Czech Republic) Jonáš Forejtek
- (Luxembourg) Alex Knaff
- (Italy) Gabriele Piraino

The following players received entry as lucky losers:

- (Bulgaria) Petr Nesterov
- (United States) Alex Rybakov

== Champions ==
=== Singles ===
- (Hungary) Zsombor Piros def. (Austria) Joel Schwärzler 7–5, 4–6, 6–3.

=== Doubles ===
- (Serbia) Stefan Latinović / (Ukraine) Vitaliy Sachko def. (Bosnia and Herzegovina) Mirza Bašić / (Bosnia and Herzegovina) Nerman Fatić 6–3, 6–4.
