= 2022 Challenger Città di Lugano – Doubles =

Doubles
- 2022 Challenger Città di Lugano

Final
- Champions: (Belgium) Ruben Bemelmans (Germany) Daniel Masur
- Runners-up: (Switzerland) Jérôme Kym (Switzerland) Leandro Riedi
- Score: 6–4, 6–7^{(5–7)}, [10–7]

Events
Singles	Doubles
- Challenger Città di Lugano

Andre Begemann and Andrea Vavassori were the defending champions but chose not to defend their title.

Ruben Bemelmans and Daniel Masur won the title after defeating Jérôme Kym and Leandro Riedi 6–4, 6–7^{(5–7)}, [10–7] in the final.

== Seeds ==
1. (United States) Hunter Reese / (Netherlands) Sem Verbeek (semifinals)
2. (Poland) Karol Drzewiecki / (Poland) Szymon Walków (quarterfinals)
3. (Switzerland) Luca Margaroli / (Austria) Lucas Miedler (quarterfinals)
4. (France) Dan Added / (France) Albano Olivetti (semifinals)

== Draw ==
Key

- Q = Qualifier
- WC = Wild card
- LL = Lucky loser
- Alt = Alternate
- ITF = ITF entry
- PR = Protected ranking
- SR = Special ranking
- SE = Special exempt
- JE = Junior exempt
- JR = Junior Accelerator Programme entrant
- CO = College Accelerator Programme entrant
- NG = Next Gen Accelerator Program entrant
- w/o = Walkover
- r = Retired
- d = Defaulted

First round
1	(United States) H Reese (Netherlands) S Verbeek	7^{7}	3	[10]
(Bosnia and Herzegovina) A Šetkić (Uzbekistan) K Sultanov	6^{5}	6	[7]
(Bosnia and Herzegovina) M Bašić (Bosnia and Herzegovina) D Džumhur	6	6
(Netherlands) G Brouwer (Poland) P Matuszewski	1	4
3	(Switzerland) L Margaroli (Austria) L Miedler	7^{7}	7^{8}
(South Korea) Y-s Chung (Ukraine) G Kravchenko	6^{3}	6^{6}
WC	(Switzerland) K Feldbausch (Switzerland) Nicolás Parizzia
WC	(Switzerland) J Kym (Switzerland) L Riedi	w/o
(Philippines) R Gonzales (India) P Raja	6^{2}	6	[6]
P Kotov (Czech Republic) D Poljak	7^{7}	2	[10]
(Switzerland) J Paul (Switzerland) Yannik Steinegger	3	6	[6]
4	(France) D Added (France) A Olivetti	6	4	[10]
(Belgium) M Geerts (Netherlands) T van Rijthoven	4	7^{7}	[6]
(Belgium) R Bemelmans (Germany) D Masur	6	6^{3}	[10]
Alt	(Italy) M Bellucci (Switzerland) R Bertola	4	6	[5]
2	(Poland) K Drzewiecki (Poland) S Walków	6	4	[10]

Quarterfinals
1	(United States) H Reese (Netherlands) S Verbeek	6^{11}	6	[10]
(Bosnia and Herzegovina) M Bašić (Bosnia and Herzegovina) D Džumhur	7^{13}	3	[8]
3	(Switzerland) L Margaroli (Austria) L Miedler	4	6^{6}
WC	(Switzerland) J Kym (Switzerland) L Riedi	6	7^{8}
P Kotov (Czech Republic) D Poljak	4	2
4	(France) D Added (France) A Olivetti	6	6
(Belgium) R Bemelmans (Germany) D Masur	7	6
2	(Poland) K Drzewiecki (Poland) S Walków	5	2

Semifinals
1	(United States) H Reese (Netherlands) S Verbeek	4	4
WC	(Switzerland) J Kym (Switzerland) L Riedi	6	6
4	(France) D Added (France) A Olivetti	6^{6}	6	[3]
(Belgium) R Bemelmans (Germany) D Masur	7^{8}	4	[10]

Final
WC	(Switzerland) J Kym (Switzerland) L Riedi	4	7^{7}	[7]
(Belgium) R Bemelmans (Germany) D Masur	6	6^{5}	[10]
