= Leandro Riedi =

Swiss tennis player (born 2002)

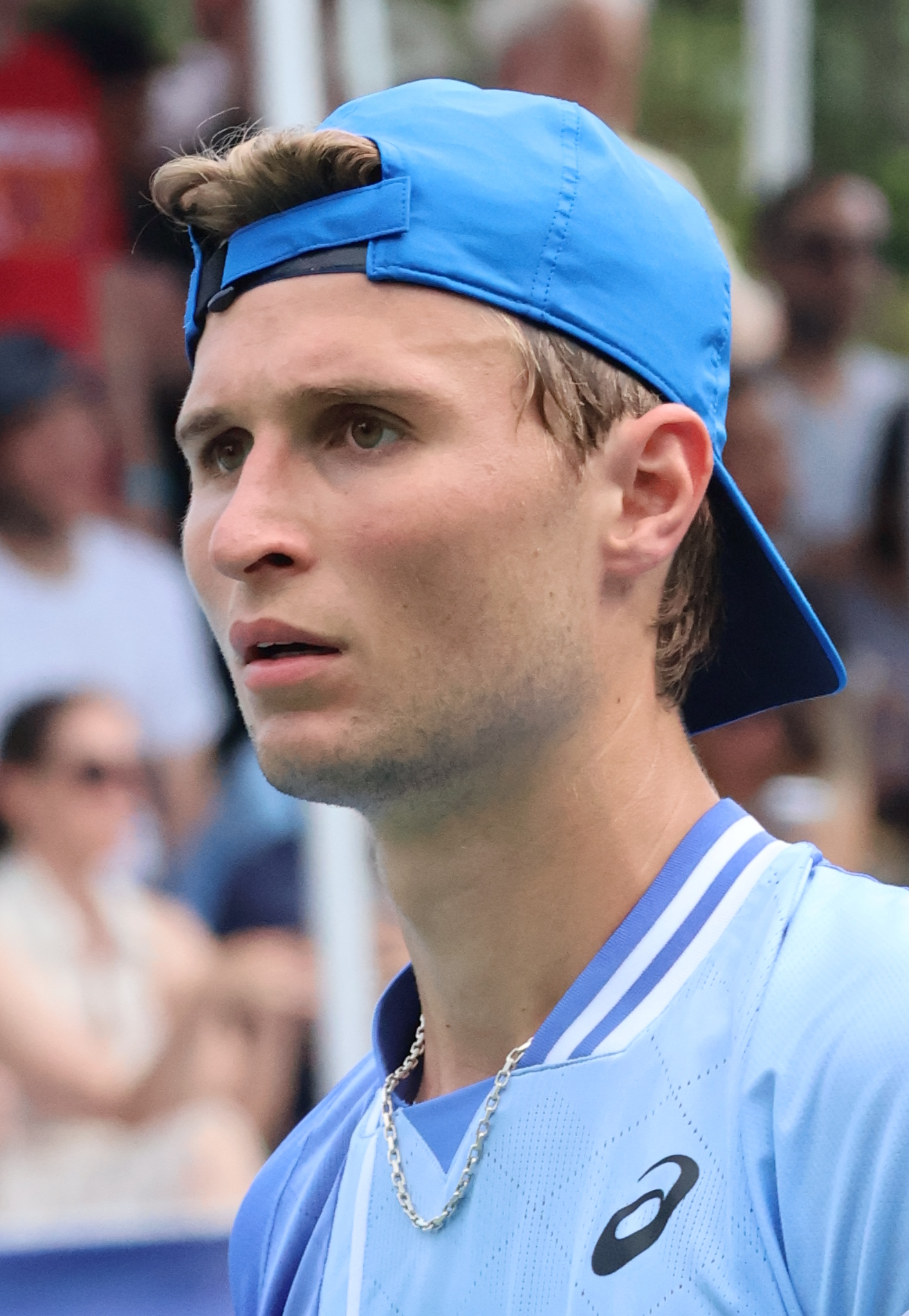
- Riedi at the 2024 Washington Open
- Country (sports): Switzerland
- Residence: Bassersdorf, Switzerland
- Born: 27 January 2002 (age 24) Frauenfeld, Switzerland
- Height: 1.91 m (6 ft 3 in)
- Turned pro: 2021
- Plays: Right-handed (two-handed backhand)
- Coach: Yannik Steinegger
- Prize money: US$ 1,239,121

Singles
- Career record: 7–11
- Career titles: 0
- Highest ranking: No. 116 (15 June 2026)
- Current ranking: No. 244 (26 October 2026)

Grand Slam singles results
- Australian Open: Q3 (2023)
- French Open: Q3 (2026)
- Wimbledon: 1R (2025)
- US Open: 4R (2025)

Doubles
- Career record: 4–4
- Career titles: 0
- Highest ranking: No. 211 (6 February 2023)
- Current ranking: No. 1,198 (26 October 2026)
- Last updated on: 25 October 2026.

Leandro Riedi (born 27 January 2002) is a Swiss professional tennis player. He has a career-high ATP singles ranking of No. 116 achieved on 15 June 2026 and a doubles ranking of No. 211 achieved on 6 February 2023. He is currently the No. 4 ATP player from Switzerland.

Riedi represents Switzerland at the Davis Cup.

== Junior career ==
Riedi had good results on the ITF junior circuit, maintaining a 93–30 singles win-loss record. With Romanian Nicholas David Ionel, he won the boys' doubles title at the 2020 Australian Open. The pair defeated sixth seeds Mikołaj Lorens and Kārlis Ozoliņš in the final. Later that season, he was a runner-up in the boys' singles category at the 2020 French Open, losing to compatriot Dominic Stricker in straight sets.

He reached an ITF junior combined ranking of world No. 6 on 12 October 2020.

== Professional career ==
=== 2021: ATP debut ===
Riedi reached five finals on the ITF Men's World Tennis Tour, winning three and losing two. In May, he won the first doubles title of his career, with Dominic Stricker, when they won the M15 Majadahonda tournament on clay courts in Spain. In October, he won his first singles title at the M15 Selva Gardena tournament on hard courts in Italy.

Riedi made his ATP debut at the 2021 Swiss Open Gstaad, receiving a wildcard in both the singles draw and the doubles draw with Jakub Paul. He lost the singles in the first round against Federico Delbonis in straight sets.

=== 2022: First Challenger title, Top 200 in singles, top 250 in doubles ===
In March, he reached his first singles and doubles finals on the ATP Challenger Tour, both at the 2022 Challenger Città di Lugano, Switzerland. He also received a wildcard for the 2022 Geneva Open for the singles and doubles, partnering with Jakub Paul. In the same month, he also won the M25 tournament in Trimbach, Switzerland and in May another M25 in Nottingham, United Kingdom.

In October, in doubles he won the Challenger tournament at Tiburon, California with Valentin Vacherot. In November, he won the 2022 HPP Open Challenger in Helsinki as a qualifier defeating Dimitar Kuzmanov and Jelle Sels, moving 80 positions up in the rankings, finishing the year in the top 200 at No. 197 on 21 November 2022. A week earlier, he reached the top 250 in doubles. The following week he won his next Challenger singles title in Andria, moving up 36 positions to No. 161 on 28 November 2022.

=== 2023: First ATP win, Masters debut ===
Riedi reached the top 150 on 9 January 2023 at world No. 135 following a final showing at the Challenger in Canberra, Australia. At the 2023 Open 13 Provence in Marseille, he recorded his first ATP win against Arthur Rinderknech. He lost to eventual champion Hubert Hurkacz.

He made his Masters main draw debut in Indian Wells as a qualifier where he lost to Jack Draper. He reached a new career-high of No. 126 on 20 March 2023.

In July at the 2023 Hopman Cup, Riedi upset world No. 6 Holger Rune in straight sets. In October, he received a wildcard for his home tournament the 2023 Swiss Indoors but lost to wildcard and eventual champion Félix Auger-Aliassime.

=== 2024: Challenger titles, Top 125, injury and early end of season ===
In January, he won back-to-back Challenger titles in Oeiras, Portugal and in Ottignies-Louvain-la-Neuve, Belgium defeating in the latter, world No. 40 Borna Ćorić for the title, his highest win by ranking thus far, and returned to the top 175 on 29 January 2024. In September, he suffered a knee injury which put an early end to his season. He subsequently underwent surgery.

=== 2025: Surgery, Major debut & fourth round, back to top 200 ===
Riedi underwent another surgery in January but still made his major debut after qualifying for the main draw at the 2025 Wimbledon Championships. Although he lost to fellow qualifier, major debutant, and local player Oliver Tarvet in the first round, he still rose more than 75 positions up back into the 500 on 14 July 2025.

Ranked No. 435 at the US Open, Riedi qualified for the main draw and recorded his first Grand Slam win over Pedro Martínez. He defeated 19th seed Francisco Cerúndolo in a five-set match, becoming the lowest-ranked player in 25 years (since Danny Sapsford at 1999 Wimbledon) to reach the third round of a major. Following his win over Kamil Majchrzak by retirement, he became the lowest-ranked player to reach a major fourth round since Richard Krajicek at the 2002 Wimbledon Championships, and the lowest-ranked player to do so at the US Open since Jay Berger in 1985. As a result, he returned to the top 175 in the singles rankings on 8 September 2025. Riedi ultimately lost to Alex de Minaur in the fourth round.

== Personal life ==
Riedi's parents worked as flight attendants, and his older sister Sarah followed in their footsteps, working in the same profession. He first picked up a racquet aged five.

== ATP Challenger Tour finals ==
=== Singles: 11 (5 titles, 6 runner-ups) ===
Legend ATP Challenger Tour (5–6)	Finals by surface Hard (5–4) Clay (0–1) Grass (0–1)

Result	W–L	Date	Tournament	Tier	Surface	Opponent	Score
Loss	0–1	Mar 2022	Challenger Città di Lugano, Switzerland	Challenger	Hard (i)	(Italy) Luca Nardi	6–4, 2–6, 3–6
Win	1–1	Nov 2022	HPP Open, Finland	Challenger	Hard (i)	(Czech Republic) Tomáš Macháč	6–3, 6–1
Win	2–1	Nov 2022	Internazionali di Castel del Monte, Italy	Challenger	Hard (i)	(Kazakhstan) Mikhail Kukushkin	7–6^{(7–4)}, 6–3
Loss	2–2	Jan 2023	Canberra Tennis International, Australia	Challenger	Hard	(Hungary) Márton Fucsovics	5–7, 4–6
Loss	2–3	Aug 2023	Winnipeg Challenger, Canada	Challenger	Hard	(United Kingdom) Ryan Peniston	4–6, 6–4, 4–6
Win	3–3	Jan 2024	Oeiras Indoors II, Portugal	Challenger	Hard (i)	(United States) Martin Damm Jr.	7–6^{(8–6)}, 6–2
Win	4–3	Jan 2024	BW Open, Belgium	Challenger	Hard (i)	(Croatia) Borna Ćorić	7–5, 6–2
Loss	4–4	Feb 2024	Open Pau–Pyrénées, France	Challenger	Hard (i)	(Finland) Otto Virtanen	5–7, 5–7
Loss	4–5	Apr 2024	Open de Madrid, Spain	Challenger	Clay	(Italy) Stefano Napolitano	3–6, 3–6
Loss	4–6	Jun 2024	Surbiton Trophy, UK	Challenger	Grass	(South Africa) Lloyd Harris	6–7^{(8–10)}, 5–7
Win	5–6	Apr 2026	Busan Open, South Korea	Challenger	Hard	(China) Bu Yunchaokete	3–6, 6–3, 6–2

=== Doubles: 3 (2 titles, 1 runner-up) ===
Legend ATP Challenger Tour (2–1)

Result	W–L	Date	Tournament	Tier	Surface	Partner	Opponents	Score
Loss	0–1	Mar 2022	Challenger Città di Lugano, Switzerland	Challenger	Hard (i)	(Switzerland) Jérôme Kym	(Belgium) Ruben Bemelmans (Germany) Daniel Masur	4–6, 7–6^{(7–5)}, [7–10]
Win	1–1	Oct 2022	Tiburon Challenger, US	Challenger	Hard	(Monaco) Valentin Vacherot	(United States) Ezekiel Clark (United States) Alfredo Perez	6–7^{(2–7)}, 6–3, [10–2]
Win	2–1	Aug 2023	Winnipeg Challenger, Canada	Challenger	Hard	(Canada) Gabriel Diallo	(Canada) Taha Baadi (Canada) Juan Carlos Aguilar	6–2, 6–3

== ITF World Tennis Tour finals ==
=== Singles: 4 (3 titles, 1 runner-up) ===
Legend ITF WTT (3–1)	Finals by surface Hard (2–1) Carpet (1–0)

Result	W–L	Date	Tournament	Tier	Surface	Opponent	Score
Win	1–0	Oct 2021	M15 Selva Gardena, Italy	WTT	Hard (i)	(Italy) Samuel Vincent Ruggeri	7–6^{(7–1)}, 3–6, 6–3
Win	2–0	Mar 2022	M25 Trimbach, Switzerland	WTT	Carpet (i)	(United Kingdom) Alastair Gray	6–2, 6–2
Win	3–0	May 2022	M25 Nottingham, UK	WTT	Hard	(United Kingdom) Stuart Parker	6–1, 6–7^{(9–11)}, 6–1
Loss	3–1	Aug 2022	M25 Aldershot, UK	WTT	Hard	(Poland) Filip Peliwo	4–6, 6–7^{(5–7)}

=== Doubles: 9 (5 titles, 4 runner-ups) ===
Legend ITF WTT (5–4)	Finals by surface Hard (2–2) Clay (3–2)

Result	W–L	Date	Tournament	Tier	Surface	Partner	Opponents	Score
Loss	0–1	Dec 2020	M15 Torelló, Spain	WTT	Hard	(France) Arthur Cazaux	(Spain) Oriol Roca Batalla (Spain) Gerard Granollers-Pujol	6–7^{(7–9)}, 6–3, [9–11]
Win	1–1	May 2021	M15 Madrid, Spain	WTT	Clay	(Switzerland) Dominic Stricker	(Switzerland) Johan Nikles (Spain) Alberto Barroso Campos	2–6, 6–2, [12–10]
Win	2–1	Jun 2021	M25 Grasse, France	WTT	Clay	(France) Dan Added	(Italy) Franco Agamenone (Poland) Piotr Matuszewski	6–1, 6–4
Loss	2–2	Jun 2021	M25 Klosters, Switzerland	WTT	Clay	(Switzerland) Dominic Stricker	(Germany) Fabian Fallert (United States) Nicolas Moreno de Alboran	6–4, 6–7^{(1–7)}, [6–10]
Loss	2–3	Jul 2021	M25 Bourg-en-Bresse, France	WTT	Clay	(Switzerland) Damien Wenger	(Sweden) Markus Eriksson (Switzerland) Jakub Paul	6–7^{(6–8)}, 7–6^{(7–3)}, [4–10]
Win	3–3	Aug 2021	M25 Caslano, Switzerland	WTT	Clay	(Switzerland) Jakub Paul	(United States) Jack Vance (United States) Jamie Vance	6–0, 6–4
Win	4–3	Oct 2021	M25 Hamburg, Germany	WTT	Hard	(Switzerland) Yannik Steinegger	(Norway) Viktor Durasovic (Ukraine) Vladyslav Orlov	6–3, 6–2
Win	5–3	Nov 2021	M25 Columbus, US	WTT	Hard	(Switzerland) Adrien Burdet	(United States) Robert Cash (United States) James Tracy	7–6^{(7–5)}, 7–6^{(7–2)}
Loss	5–4	Feb 2022	M15 Grenoble, France	WTT	Hard (i)	(Switzerland) Louroi Martinez	(France) Arthur Bouquier (France) Martin Breysach	2–6, 3–6

== Junior Grand Slam finals ==
=== Singles: 1 (runner-up) ===
Result	Year	Tournament	Surface	Opponent	Score
Loss	2020	French Open	Clay	(Switzerland) Dominic Stricker	2–6, 4–6

=== Doubles: 1 (title) ===
Result	Year	Tournament	Surface	Partner	Opponents	Score
Win	2020	Australian Open	Hard	(Romania) Nicholas David Ionel	(Poland) Mikołaj Lorens (Latvia) Kārlis Ozoliņš	6–7^{(8–10)}, 7–5, [10–4]
