= Daniel Masur =

German tennis player

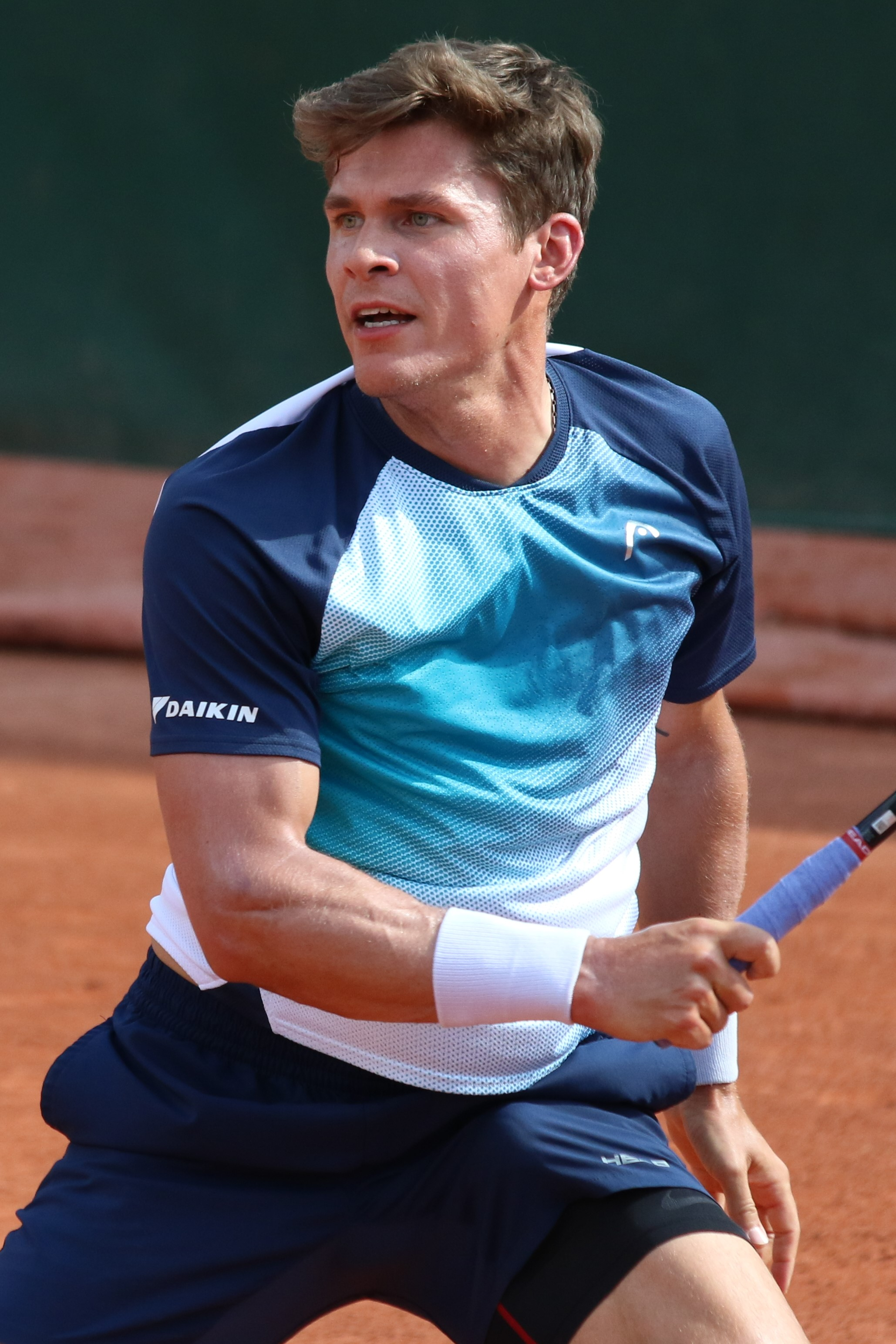
- Masur at the 2022 French Open
- Country (sports): Germany
- Residence: Munich, Germany
- Born: 6 November 1994 (age 32) Bückeburg, Germany
- Height: 1.83 m (6 ft 0 in)
- Turned pro: 2013
- Plays: Right-handed (two handed-backhand)
- Coach: Lars Uebel
- Prize money: US $886,998

Singles
- Career record: 1–7
- Career titles: 0
- Highest ranking: No. 176 (7 March 2022)
- Current ranking: No. 351 (9 November 2026)

Grand Slam singles results
- Australian Open: Q1 (2017, 2021, 2022)
- French Open: Q3 (2017, 2022)
- Wimbledon: 1R (2021)
- US Open: Q2 (2022)

Doubles
- Career record: 3–10
- Career titles: 0
- Highest ranking: No. 149 (12 September 2022)
- Current ranking: No. 182 (9 November 2026)

Team competitions
- Davis Cup: 0–1
- Last updated on: 9 November 2026.

Daniel Masur (German pronunciation: [ˈdaːni̯eːl maˈzuːɐ̯, -ni̯ɛl -]; born 6 November 1994 in Bückeburg) is a German professional tennis player. He has a career-high ATP singles ranking of world No. 176 achieved on 7 March 2022 and doubles ranking of No. 149 achieved on 12 September 2022.

== Juniors ==
On the junior tour, Masur has a career high ITF junior ranking of No. 13 achieved in September 2012. Masur was a semifinalist at the 2012 US Open boys' doubles event, partnering Maximilian Marterer.

== Professional career ==
=== 2016–2020: ATP debut and first ATP match win ===
Masur made his ATP main draw debut as a lucky loser at the 2016 German Open in Hamburg in the doubles draw, partnering Cedrik-Marcel Stebe.

He won his first singles match on ATP-level as a qualifier at the 2018 German Open, defeating Maximilian Marterer in the first round.

In the first round of the 2019 Hamburg Open doubles draw, he and partner Julian Lenz upset compatriots Alexander and Mischa Zverev after saving two match points.

=== 2021–2025: Major, top 200 and United Cup debuts, Challenger title ===
In March 2021, he won his first ATP Challenger singles title in Biella.

Masur qualified for the first time in his career for a Grand Slam main draw at the 2021 Wimbledon Championships. In November, he won the second 2021 Challenger Eckental title defeating Maxime Cressy. Following a third Challenger final in Bari, Italy he reached the top 200 at No. 183 on 29 November 2021.

Ranked No. 254, Masur was selected as the No. 2 singles player for team Germany at the 2025 United Cup. He replaced Alexander Zverev in the quarterfinals stage, after the world No. 2 pulled out due to injury.

== Singles performance timeline ==
Key
W	F	SF	QF	#R	RR	Q#	DNQ	A	NH

(W) winner; (F) finalist; (SF) semifinalist; (QF) quarterfinalist; (#R) rounds 4, 3, 2, 1; (RR) round-robin stage; (Q#) qualification round; (DNQ) did not qualify; (A) absent; (NH) not held; (SR) strike rate (events won / competed); (W–L) win–loss record.
To avoid confusion and double counting, these charts are updated at the conclusion of a tournament or when the player's participation has ended.

Current through the 2025 Davis Cup Qualifiers first round.

Tournament	2017	2018	2019	2020	2021	2022	2023	2024	2025	SR	W–L
Grand Slam tournaments
Australian Open	Q1	A	A	A	Q1	Q1	A	A	A	0 / 0	0–0
French Open	Q3	A	A	Q1	Q1	Q3	A	A		0 / 0	0–0
Wimbledon	Q1	A	A	NH	1R	Q3	A	A		0 / 1	0–1
US Open	Q1	A	A	A	Q1	Q2	A	A		0 / 0	0–0
Win–loss	0–0	0–0	0–0	0–0	0–1	0–0	0–0	0–0	0–0	0 / 1	0–1
Career statistics
Tournaments	2	2	0	0	1	0	0	0	0	5	
Overall win–loss	0–2	1–2	0–0	0–0	0–1	0–0	0–0	0–0	0–2	1–7	
Year-end ranking	348	258	253	245	183	289	424	254		13%	

== ATP Challenger finals ==
=== Singles: 4 (2–2) ===
Result	W–L	Date	Tournament	Surface	Opponent	Score
Win	1–0	Mar 2021	Biella, Italy	Hard (i)	(Germany) Matthias Bachinger	6–3, 6–7^{(8–10)}, 7–5
Win	2–0	Nov 2021	Eckental, Germany	Carpet (i)	(United States) Maxime Cressy	6–4, 6–4
Loss	2–1	Nov 2021	Bari, Italy	Hard	(Germany) Oscar Otte	5–7, 5–7
Loss	2–2	Mar 2024	Lugano, Switzerland	Hard (i)	(Finland) Otto Virtanen	7–6^{(7–4)}, 4–6, 6–7^{(3–7)}

=== Doubles: 16 (12–4) ===
Result	W–L	Date	Tournament	Surface	Partner	Opponents	Score
Win	1–0	Sep 2016	Alphen, Netherlands	Clay	(Germany) Jan-Lennard Struff	(Netherlands) Robin Haase (Netherlands) Boy Westerhof	6–4, 6–1
Win	2–0	Nov 2016	Kobe, Japan	Hard (i)	(Croatia) Ante Pavić	(India) Jeevan Nedunchezhiyan (Indonesia) Christopher Rungkat	4–6, 6–3, [10–6]
Win	3–0	Sep 2019	Glasgow, United Kingdom	Hard (i)	(Belgium) Ruben Bemelmans	(United Kingdom) Jamie Murray (Australia) John-Patrick Smith	4–6, 6–3, [10–8]
Win	4–0	Nov 2019	Maia, Portugal	Clay	(Germany) Andre Begemann	(Spain) Guillermo García López (Spain) David Vega Hernández	7–6^{(7–2)}, 6–4
Win	5–0	Feb 2021	Quimper, France	Hard (i)	(Belgium) Ruben Bemelmans	(United States) Brandon Nakashima (United States) Hunter Reese	6–2, 6–1
Win	6–0	Sep 2021	Biel/Bienne, Switzerland	Hard (i)	(Belgium) Ruben Bemelmans	(Switzerland) Marc-Andrea Hüsler (Switzerland) Dominic Stricker	w/o
Loss	6–1	Nov 2021	Eckental, Germany	Carpet (i)	(Belgium) Ruben Bemelmans	(Czech Republic) Roman Jebavý (United Kingdom) Jonny O'Mara	4–6, 5–7
Win	7–1	Jan 2022	Bendigo, Australia	Hard	(Belgium) Ruben Bemelmans	(France) Enzo Couacaud (Slovenia) Blaž Rola	7–6^{(7–2)}, 6–4
Win	8–1	Mar 2022	Turin, Italy	Hard (i)	(Belgium) Ruben Bemelmans	(Netherlands) Sander Arends (Netherlands) David Pel	3–6, 6–3, [10–8]
Win	9–1	Mar 2022	Lugano, Switzerland	Hard (i)	(Belgium) Ruben Bemelmans	(Switzerland) Jérôme Kym (Switzerland) Leandro Riedi	6–4, 6–7^{(5–7)}, [10–7]
Loss	9–2	Feb 2023	Vilnius, Lithuania	Hard (i)	(India) Arjun Kadhe	(Belarus) Ivan Liutarevich (Ukraine) Vladyslav Manafov	0–6, 2–6
Win	10–2	Aug 2025	Augsburg, Germany	Clay	(Germany) Benito Sanchez Martinez	(Czech Republic) Jiří Barnat (Czech Republic) Filip Duda	7–6^{(7–2)}, 6–2
Win	11–2	Sep 2025	Istanbul, Turkey	Hard	(Slovakia) Miloš Karol	(Greece) Stefanos Sakellaridis (India) Karan Singh	7–6^{(7–2)}, 6–1
Loss	11–3	Jan 2026	Nottingham, United Kingdom	Hard (i)	(Slovakia) Miloš Karol	(United Kingdom) Charles Broom (United Kingdom) David Stevenson	2–6, 6–7^{(5–7)}
Win	12–3	Sep 2026	Cassis, France	Hard	(France) Dan Added	(United Kingdom) Tom Hands (United Kingdom) Matthew Summers	6–4, 6–2
Loss	12–4	Sep 2026	Saint-Tropez, France	Hard	(France) Constantin Bittoun	(Switzerland) Jakub Paul (Czech Republic) Matěj Vocel	4–6, 3–6

== ITF Futures/World Tennis Tour finals ==
=== Singles: 19 (14–5) ===
Result	W–L	Date	Tournament	Surface	Opponent	Score
Win	1–0	Jul 2014	Belgium F6, Knokke	Clay	(North Macedonia) Dimitar Grabul	7–6^{(8–6)}, 4–6, 7–6^{(8–6)}
Win	2–0	Sep 2014	Spain F28, Sevilla	Clay	(Argentina) Pedro Cachin	7–5, 6–3
Win	3–0	Nov 2014	Kuwait F2, Mishref	Hard	(Spain) Roberto Ortega Olmedo	7–6^{(7–5)}, 7–5
Win	4–0	Aug 2015	Germany F13, Ueberlingen	Clay	(Chile) Laslo Urrutia Fuentes	6–1, 6–4
Win	5–0	Jan 2016	Germany F1, Schwieberdingen	Carpet (i)	(Germany) Andreas Beck	7–6^{(12–10)}, 6–7^{(11–13)}, 7–6^{(7–5)}
Loss	5–1	Jun 2016	Netherlands F2, Breda	Clay	(Belgium) Joris De Loore	2–6, 2–6
Loss	5–2	Aug 2016	Poland F6, Poznań	Clay	(India) Sumit Nagal	4–6, 6–1, 3–6
Loss	5–3	Jan 2017	Germany F1, Nußloch	Carpet (i)	(Germany) Mats Moraing	6–7^{(5–7)}, 6–7^{(5–7)}
Win	6–3	Feb 2017	Germany F16, Hamburg	Hard (i)	(Germany) Daniel Altmaier	6–3, 3–6, 6–3
Win	7–3	Jan 2018	Germany F1, Schwieberdingen	Carpet (i)	(Germany) Kevin Krawietz	6–2, 7–5
Win	8–3	Aug 2019	M25, Schlieren, Switzerland	Clay	(France) Benjamin Bonzi	6–4, 6–2
Win	9–3	Jan 2023	M25, Nußloch, Germany	Carpet (i)	(France) Matteo Martineau	6–3, 2–6, 7–6^{(7–1)}
Win	10–3	Feb 2023	M15, Oberhaching, Germany	Hard (i)	(Germany) Rudolf Molleker	7–6^{(7–4)}, 7–6^{(7–3)}
Win	11–3	Jan 2024	M15, Cadolzburg, Germany	Carpet (i)	(Republic of Ireland) Michael Agwi	6–3, 3–6, 6–4
Win	12–3	Jan 2024	M25, Nußloch, Germany	Carpet (i)	(Germany) Tom Gentzsch	6–1, 6–3
Win	13–3	Feb 2024	M25, Trento, Italy	Hard (i)	(Italy) Giovanni Oradini	7–6^{(7–5)}, 6–3
Win	14–3	Feb 2026	M25, Nußloch, Germany	Carpet (i)	(Latvia) Kārlis Ozoliņš	6–4, 4–6, 6–1
Loss	14–4	Mar 2026	M25, Trimbach, Switzerland	Carpet (i)	(Switzerland) Dominic Stricker	7–6^{(7–5)}, 3–6, 4–6
Loss	14–5	Nov 2026	M25, Marsa, Malta	Hard	(Ukraine) Georgii Kravchenko	4–6, 6–7^{(4–7)}
