= Challenger Città di Lugano =

- 2026 Challenger Città di Lugano

ATP Challenger Tour
- Event name: 4° Città di Lugano (2024), Challenger BancaStato Città di Lugano (2021-2023)
- Founded: 2021
- Editions: 6
- Location: Lugano, Switzerland
- Venue: Padiglione Conza
- Category: ATP Challenger Tour
- Surface: Hard (indoor)
- Draw: 32S/24Q/16D
- Prize money: €91,250 (2025)
- Website: challengerlugano.com

Current champions (2025)
- Singles: (Hungary) Zsombor Piros
- Doubles: (Serbia) Stefan Latinović (Ukraine) Vitaliy Sachko

The Challenger Città di Lugano (previously Challenger BancaStato Città di Lugano) is a professional tennis tournament played on indoor hardcourts. It is currently part of the ATP Challenger Tour. It is held annually in Lugano, Switzerland. It is organized by Riccardo Margaroli.

== Past finals ==
=== Singles ===
Year	Champion	Runner-up	Score
2026	(Hungary) Zsombor Piros	(Austria) Joel Schwärzler	7–5, 4–6, 6–3
2025	(Croatia) Borna Ćorić	(Belgium) Raphaël Collignon	6–3, 6–1
2024	(Finland) Otto Virtanen (2)	(Germany) Daniel Masur	6–7^{(4–7)}, 6–4, 7–6^{(7–3)}
2023	(Finland) Otto Virtanen (1)	(Turkey) Cem İlkel	6–4, 7–6^{(7–5)}
2022	(Italy) Luca Nardi	(Switzerland) Leandro Riedi	4–6, 6–2, 6–3
2021	(Switzerland) Dominic Stricker	(Ukraine) Vitaliy Sachko	6–4, 6–2

=== Doubles ===
Year	Champions	Runners-up	Score
2026	(Serbia) Stefan Latinović (Ukraine) Vitaliy Sachko	(Bosnia and Herzegovina) Mirza Bašić (Bosnia and Herzegovina) Nerman Fatić	6–3, 6–4
2025	(Canada) Cleeve Harper (United Kingdom) David Stevenson	(Switzerland) Jakub Paul (Netherlands) David Pel	4–6, 6–3, [10–8]
2024	(Netherlands) Sander Arends (Netherlands) Sem Verbeek	(Germany) Constantin Frantzen (Germany) Hendrik Jebens	6–7^{(9–11)}, 7–6^{(7–1)}, [10–8]
2023	(Belgium) Zizou Bergs (Netherlands) David Pel	(Germany) Constantin Frantzen (Germany) Hendrik Jebens	6–2, 7–6^{(8–6)}
2022	(Belgium) Ruben Bemelmans (Germany) Daniel Masur	(Switzerland) Jérôme Kym (Switzerland) Leandro Riedi	6–4, 6–7^{(5–7)}, [10–7]
2021	(Germany) Andre Begemann (Italy) Andrea Vavassori	(Ukraine) Denys Molchanov (Ukraine) Sergiy Stakhovsky	7–6^{(13–11)}, 4–6, [10–8]
