= Dominic Stricker =

Swiss tennis player (born 2002)

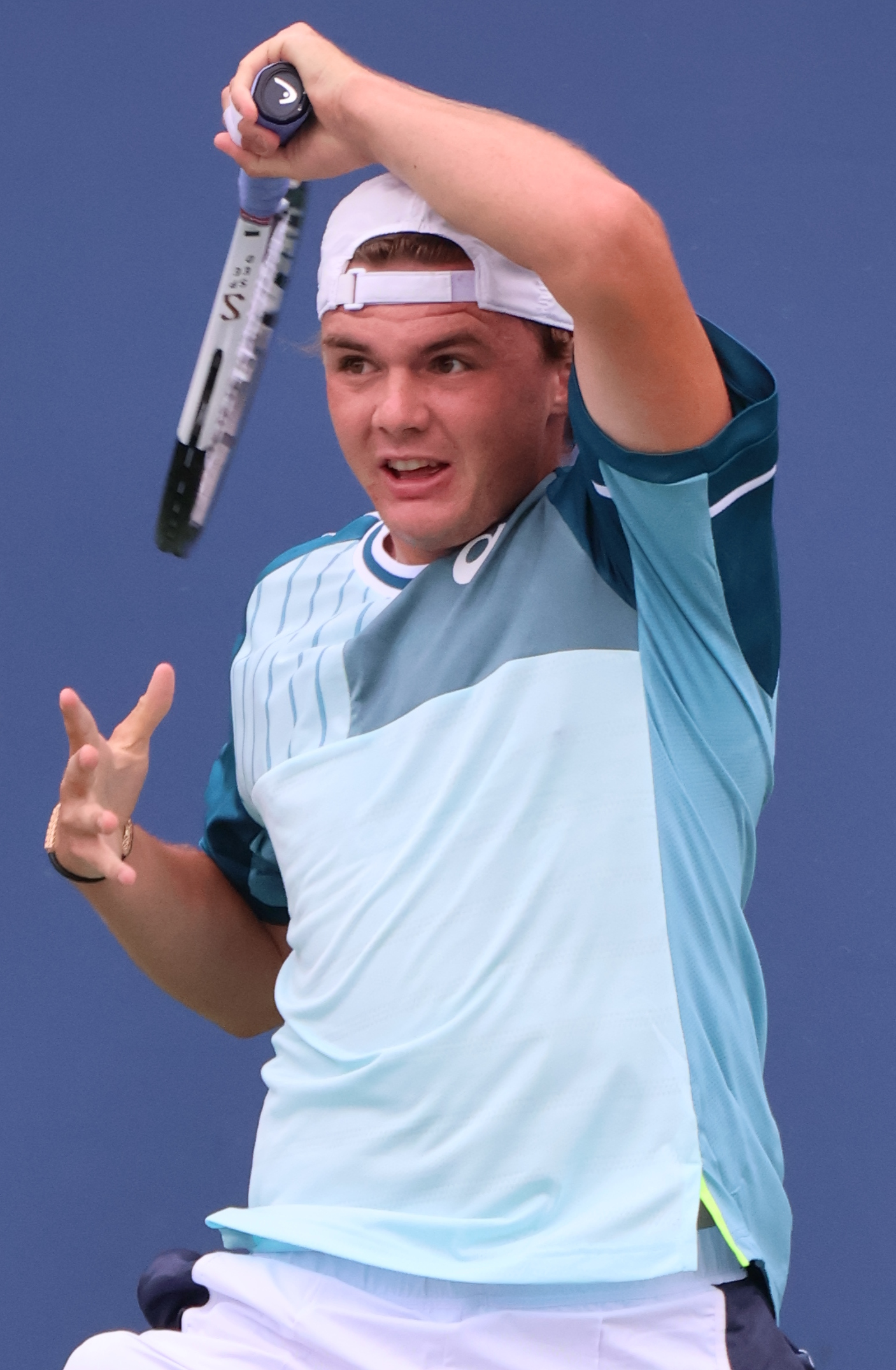
- Stricker at the 2023 US Open
- Full name: Dominic Stephan Stricker
- Country (sports): Switzerland
- Residence: Grosshöchstetten, Switzerland
- Born: 16 August 2002 (age 24) Grosshöchstetten, Switzerland
- Height: 1.83 m (6 ft 0 in)
- Turned pro: 2020
- Plays: Left-handed (two-handed backhand)
- Coach: Dieter Kindlmann (Apr 2023–Apr 2025)
- Prize money: US $2,000,823

Singles
- Career record: 26–35
- Career titles: 0
- Highest ranking: No. 88 (2 October 2023)
- Current ranking: No. 253 (26 October 2026)

Grand Slam singles results
- Australian Open: 1R (2025)
- French Open: 1R (2023)
- Wimbledon: 2R (2023)
- US Open: 4R (2023)

Doubles
- Career record: 25–19
- Career titles: 2
- Highest ranking: No. 161 (27 June 2022)
- Current ranking: No. 476 (26 October 2026)

Grand Slam doubles results
- US Open: 2R (2024)
- Last updated on: 31 October 2026.

Dominic Stephan Stricker (Swiss Standard German: [ˈʃtrɪkər]; born 16 August 2002) is a Swiss professional tennis player. He has a career-high ATP singles ranking of world No. 88 achieved on 2 October 2023 and a best doubles ranking of No. 161 reached on 27 June 2022.

Stricker has won two ATP Tour titles in doubles. He represents Switzerland at the Davis Cup.

== Career ==
=== Juniors ===
Stricker won the 2020 French Open boys' singles title, defeating compatriot Leandro Riedi in the final. He also won the boys' doubles category at the same event, with Italian Flavio Cobolli.

Stricker had good results on the ITF junior circuit, maintaining a 100–43 singles win-loss record and reached an ITF junior combined ranking of world No. 3 on 12 October 2020.

=== 2021: ATP debut & Top 250 in singles, maiden ATP title & Top 200 in doubles ===
In March, ranked No. 874 in the world, Stricker received a wildcard entry into the 2021 BSI Challenger Lugano, Switzerland. He won the tournament, defeating Vitaliy Sachko in straight sets in the final. He became the 3rd youngest Swiss player after Roger Federer and Stan Wawrinka to win an ATP Challenger title. Following this successful run, he made his top 500 debut in singles.

In May, Stricker made his ATP debut at the 2021 Geneva Open as a wildcard where he beat former US Open champion and former ATP ranked number 3 Marin Čilić in the first round for his first ATP victory. He then defeated Márton Fucsovics to reach his first ATP tour level quarterfinal. He reached a career-high of World No. 334 in singles on 24 May 2021.

In June at the 2021 MercedesCup in Stuttgart he reached again the quarterfinals where he defeated second seed Hubert Hurkacz for his first top-20 win of the season. As a result, he moved into the top 300 at No. 289 on 14 June 2021.

In July, partnering again with Vitaliy Sachko, he won his maiden Challenger doubles title at the 2021 Internazionali di Tennis Città di Perugia defeating Argentines Tomás Martín Etcheverry/Renzo Olivo. He reached a career-high of No. 280 in singles and No. 371 in doubles on 12 July 2021.

Stricker won his maiden ATP doubles title at the 2021 Swiss Open Gstaad, partnering Marc-Andrea Hüsler, defeating Polish pair Szymon Walków and Jan Zieliński.

In September, partnering also Marc-Andrea Hüsler, he reached the final of the 2021 Challenger Biel/Bienne, Switzerland but withdrew. As a result, he reached a new career-high doubles ranking of World No. 196 on 27 September 2021. He also reached the semifinals in singles, resulting in a new career-high singles ranking of World No. 269 on 4 October 2021.

=== 2022: Top 125 debut in singles ===
Stricker reached the top 200 at World No. 164 on 7 February 2022 after winning his second ATP Challenger title at the 2022 Cleveland Open. After reaching his third Challenger final and second title of the season at the 2022 Zug Open in Switzerland, he moved into the top 150.

In October, at the 2022 European Open in Antwerp, he defeated seventh seed Botic van de Zandschulp in straight sets in the first round as a qualifier. The following week, at the 2022 Swiss Indoors, he also reached the second round as a wildcard defeating Maxime Cressy improving his chances to qualify for the 2022 Next Generation ATP Finals. He qualified for the 2022 Next Generation ATP Finals on 27 October 2022 and reached the semifinals undefeated beating top seed Lorenzo Musetti en route in a five set thriller lasting close to two hours and a half.

=== 2023: Grand Slam debut & first win, two top-10 wins, top 100 ===
At the 2023 Australian Open he reached the third round of qualifying.

In May, he won his fifth Challenger at the Prague Open becoming the only Swiss player to win five Challenger titles before his 21st birthday.

Ranked No. 116, he made his Grand Slam main draw debut at the 2023 French Open after entering the draw as lucky loser. He won his first Major match at the 2023 Wimbledon Championships defeating Alexei Popyrin in five sets after qualifying for the main draw. He won his second doubles title at the 2023 Swiss Open Gstaad as a wildcard pair partnering Stan Wawrinka, defeating the pair Marcelo Demoliner and Matwé Middelkoop.

Ranked No. 128, he reached the fourth round of a Major at the US Open after qualifying and defeating again Alexei Popyrin, upsetting seventh seed Stefanos Tsitsipas in five sets and Benjamin Bonzi also in five. As a result, he reached the top 100 at world No. 90 on 11 September 2023, becoming the youngest Swiss to reach the milestone since 20-year-old Stan Wawrinka did so in 2005. He entered the 2023 Swiss Indoors as a wildcard and reached the quarterfinals defeating qualifier Benjamin Hassan and second seed Casper Ruud, his second top-10 win.

In November, he qualified again for the 2023 Next Generation ATP Finals and again reached the semifinals.

=== 2024-25: Hiatus, United Cup debut ===
Ranked No. 300, Stricker competed as part of the Swiss team at the 2025 United Cup following a long six months hiatus from the ATP Tour in the first half of 2024.

== Performance timelines ==
Key
W	F	SF	QF	#R	RR	Q#	DNQ	A	NH

(W) winner; (F) finalist; (SF) semifinalist; (QF) quarterfinalist; (#R) rounds 4, 3, 2, 1; (RR) round-robin stage; (Q#) qualification round; (DNQ) did not qualify; (A) absent; (NH) not held; (SR) strike rate (events won / competed); (W–L) win–loss record.
To avoid confusion and double counting, these charts are updated at the conclusion of a tournament or when the player's participation has ended.

=== Singles ===
Current through the 2026 Swiss Indoors.

Tournament	2021	2022	2023	2024	2025	2026	SR	W–L
Grand Slam tournaments
Australian Open	A	Q2	Q3	A	1R		0 / 0	0–0
French Open	A	Q2	1R	A	A		0 / 1	0–1
Wimbledon		Q2	2R	1R	Q3		0 / 2	1–2
US Open	A	Q1	4R	1R	Q1		0 / 2	3–2
Win–loss	0–0	0–0	4–3	0–2			0 / 5	4–5
National representation
Davis Cup	WG2	WG1	QR				0 / 0	1–1
Career statistics
Tournaments	3	5	7	6	4	1	26	
Overall win–loss	5–3	7–6	8–11	4–6	1–6	1–1	26–33	
Year-end ranking	241	118	94	301	368		44%	

=== Doubles ===
Tournament	2021	2022	2023	SR	W–L
Grand Slam tournaments
Australian Open	A	A	A	0 / 0	0–0
French Open	A	A	A	0 / 0	0–0
Wimbledon	A	A	A	0 / 0	0–0
US Open	A	A	A	0 / 0	0–0
Win–loss	0–0	0–0	0–0	0 / 0	0–0
National representation
Davis Cup	G2	G1	QR	0 / 0	3–1
Career statistics
Tournaments	3	3	1	7	
Titles	1	0	1	2	
Finals	1	0	1	2	
Overall win–loss	6–2	2–3	4–1	12–6	
Year-end ranking	193	435	250	67%	

== ATP Tour finals ==
=== Doubles: 3 (2 titles, 1 runner-up) ===
Legend ATP 500 (0–1) ATP 250 (2–0)	Finals by surface Hard (0–1) Clay (2–0)	Finals by setting Outdoor (2–0) Indoor (0–1)

Result	W–L	Date	Tournament	Tier	Surface	Partner	Opponents	Score
Win	1–0	Jul 2021	Swiss Open Gstaad, Switzerland	ATP 250	Clay	(Switzerland) Marc-Andrea Hüsler	(Poland) Szymon Walków (Poland) Jan Zieliński	6–1, 7–6^{(9–7)}
Win	2–0	Jul 2023	Swiss Open Gstaad, Switzerland (2)	ATP 250	Clay	(Switzerland) Stan Wawrinka	(Brazil) Marcelo Demoliner (Netherlands) Matwé Middelkoop	7–6^{(10–8)}, 6–2
Loss	2–1	Oct 2026	Swiss Indoors, Switzerland	ATP 500	Hard (i)	(Switzerland) Henry Bernet	(France) Théo Arribagé (France) Albano Olivetti	6–7^{(6–8)}, 6–7^{(6–8)}

== ATP Challenger Tour finals ==
=== Singles: 7 (6 titles, 1 runner-up) ===
Legend ATP Challenger (6–1)	Finals by surface Hard (3–1) Clay (3–0)

Result	W–L	Date	Tournament	Surface	Opponent	Score
Win	1–0	Mar 2021	Challenger Città di Lugano, Switzerland	Hard (i)	(Ukraine) Vitaliy Sachko	6–4, 6–2
Loss	1–1	Jan 2022	Columbus Challenger, US	Hard (i)	(Japan) Yoshihito Nishioka	2–6, 4–6
Win	2–1	Jan 2022	Cleveland Open, US	Hard (i)	(Japan) Yoshihito Nishioka	7–5, 6–1
Win	3–1	Jul 2022	Zug Open, Switzerland	Clay	(Latvia) Ernests Gulbis	5–7, 6–1, 6–3
Win	4–1	Feb 2023	Internazionali Città di Rovereto, Italy	Hard (i)	(Italy) Giulio Zeppieri	7–6^{(10–8)}, 6–2
Win	5–1	May 2023	Prague Open, Czech Republic	Clay	(Austria) Sebastian Ofner	7–6^{(9–7)}, 6–3
Win	6–1	Aug 2026	Open de Sion, Switzerland	Clay	(Lebanon) Benjamin Hassan	6–1, 2–6, 6–2

=== Doubles: 3 (1 title, 2 runner-ups) ===
Legend ATP Challenger (1–2)

Result	W–L	Date	Tournament	Surface	Partner	Opponents	Score
Win	1–0	Jul 2021	Internazionali Città di Perugia, Italy	Clay	(Ukraine) Vitaliy Sachko	(Argentina) Tomás Martín Etcheverry (Argentina) Renzo Olivo	6–3, 5–7, [10–8]
Loss	1–1	Sep 2021	Challenger Biel/Bienne, Switzerland	Hard (i)	(Switzerland) Marc-Andrea Hüsler	(Belgium) Ruben Bemelmans (Germany) Daniel Masur	walkover
Loss	1–2	Jan 2022	Traralgon Tennis International, Australia	Hard	(Switzerland) Marc-Andrea Hüsler	(France) Manuel Guinard (Czech Republic) Zdeněk Kolář	3–6, 4–6

== ITF Tour finals ==
=== Singles: 4 (2 titles, 2 runner-ups) ===
Legend ITF World Tennis (2–2)	Finals by surface Hard (1–0) Clay (0–1) Carpet (1–1)

Result	W–L	Date	Tournament	Surface	Opponent	Score
Loss	0–1	Mar 2025	M25 Trimbach, Switzerland	Carpet (i)	(Estonia) Daniil Glinka	4–6, 2–6
Loss	0–2	Apr 2025	M25 Santa Margherita di Pula, Italy	Clay	(Netherlands) Max Houkes	3–6, 5–7
Win	1–2	Mar 2026	M25 Trimbach, Switzerland	Carpet (i)	(Germany) Daniel Masur	6–7^{(5–7)}, 6–3, 6–4
Win	2–2	Mar 2026	M25 Saint-Dizier, France	Hard (i)	(Austria) Sebastian Sorger	6–3, 7–6^{(7–2)}

=== Doubles: 4 (2 titles, 2 runner-ups) ===
Legend ITF World Tennis (2–2)	Finals by surface Hard (0–1) Clay (2–1)

Result	W–L	Date	Tournament	Surface	Partner	Opponents	Score
Loss	0–1	Feb 2021	M15 Grenoble, France	Hard (i)	(Switzerland) Luca Castelnuovo	(Switzerland) Yannik Steinegger (Switzerland) Jakub Paul	5–7, 1–6
Win	1–1	May 2021	M15 Madrid, Spain	Clay	(Switzerland) Leandro Riedi	(Switzerland) Johan Nikles (Spain) Alberto Barroso Campos	2–6, 6–2, [12–10]
Loss	1–2	Jun 2021	M25 Klosters, Switzerland	Clay	(Switzerland) Leandro Riedi	(Germany) Fabian Fallert (United States) Nicolas Moreno de Alboran	6–4, 6–7^{(1–7)}, [6–10]
Win	2–2	Jun 2026	M25 Klosters, Switzerland	Clay	(Switzerland) Alessandro Hunziker	(Germany) Kai Wehnelt (Germany) Louis Wessels	walkover

== Junior Grand Slam finals ==
=== Singles: 1 (title) ===
Result	Year	Tournament	Surface	Opponent	Score
Win	2020	French Open	Clay	(Switzerland) Leandro Riedi	6–2, 6–4

=== Doubles: 2 (1 title, 1 runner-up) ===
Result	Year	Tournament	Surface	Partner	Opponents	Score
Loss	2019	French Open	Clay	(Italy) Flavio Cobolli	(Brazil) Matheus Pucinelli de Almeida (Argentina) Thiago Agustín Tirante	6–7^{(3–7)}, 4–6
Win	2020	French Open	Clay	(Italy) Flavio Cobolli	(Brazil) Bruno Oliveira (Brazil) Natan Rodrigues	6–2, 6–4

== Wins over top 10 players ==
- Stricker has a 2–3 record against players who were, at the time the match was played, ranked in the top 10.

Season	2023	Total
Wins	2	2

#	Player	Rank	Event	Surface	Rd	Score	DSR
2023
1.	(Greece) Stefanos Tsitsipas	7	US Open, United States	Hard	2R	7–5, 6–7^{(2–7)}, 6–7^{(5–7)}, 7–6^{(8–6)}, 6–3	128
2.	(Norway) Casper Ruud	8	Swiss Indoors, Switzerland	Hard (i)	2R	6–4, 3–6, 7–6^{(7–1)}	96
