= 2021 Challenger Biel/Bienne =

Hard court tennis tourneament

- Date: 20–26 September
- Edition: 1st
- Surface: Hard (Indoor)
- Location: Biel/Bienne, Switzerland

Champions

Singles
- (United Kingdom) Liam Broady

Doubles
- (Belgium) Ruben Bemelmans / (Germany) Daniel Masur
Challenger Biel/Bienne	· 2022 →

The 2021 FlowBank Challenger Biel/Bienne was a professional tennis tournament played on indoor hard courts. It was the 1st edition of the tournament which was part of the 2021 ATP Challenger Tour. It took place in Biel/Bienne, Switzerland between 20 and 26 September 2021.

== Singles main-draw entrants ==
=== Seeds ===
Country	Player	Rank^{1}	Seed
~~FRA~~	~~Pierre-Hugues Herbert~~	~~98~~	~~1~~
SUI	Henri Laaksonen	119	2
AUT	Dennis Novak	121	3
CZE	Tomáš Macháč	143	4
GBR	Liam Broady	145	5
POR	João Sousa	150	6
SUI	Marc-Andrea Hüsler	160	7
TUR	Cem İlkel	176	8

- ^{1} Rankings are as of 13 September 2021.

=== Other entrants ===
The following players received wildcards into the singles main draw:

- (Switzerland) Jérôme Kym
- (Switzerland) Leandro Riedi
- (Switzerland) Dominic Stricker

The following players received entry into the singles main draw as alternates:

- (Germany) Matthias Bachinger
- (Russia) Andrey Kuznetsov

The following players received entry from the qualifying draw:

- (France) Antoine Escoffier
- (Japan) Hiroki Moriya
- (Switzerland) Jakub Paul
- (United States) Alexander Ritschard

The following player received entry as a lucky loser:

- (Russia) Alexander Shevchenko

== Champions ==
=== Singles ===
- (United Kingdom) Liam Broady def. (Switzerland) Marc-Andrea Hüsler 7–5, 6–3.

=== Doubles ===
- (Belgium) Ruben Bemelmans / (Germany) Daniel Masur def. (Switzerland) Marc-Andrea Hüsler / (Switzerland) Dominic Stricker Walkover.
