= 2026 Miyazaki Challenger – Doubles =

Doubles
- 2026 Miyazaki Challenger

Final
- Champions: (South Korea) Nam Ji-sung (Finland) Patrik Niklas-Salminen
- Runners-up: (Japan) Yuta Shimizu (Japan) James Trotter
- Score: 7–5, 6–3

Events
| Singles | Doubles |
- Miyazaki Challenger

This was the first edition of the tournament.

Nam Ji-sung and Patrik Niklas-Salminen won the title after defeating Yuta Shimizu and James Trotter 7–5, 6–3 in the final.

== Seeds ==
1. (South Korea) Nam Ji-sung / (Finland) Patrik Niklas-Salminen (champions)
2. (Chinese Taipei) Hsu Yu-hsiou / (Chinese Taipei) Huang Tsung-hao (withdrew)
3. (India) Jeevan Nedunchezhiyan / (India) Ramkumar Ramanathan (first round)
4. (Chinese Taipei) Jason Jung / (Japan) Kaito Uesugi (quarterfinals)
5. (France) Dan Added / (Japan) Naoki Tajima (first round)

== Draw ==
Key

- Q = Qualifier
- WC = Wild card
- LL = Lucky loser
- Alt = Alternate
- ITF = ITF entry
- PR = Protected ranking
- SR = Special ranking
- SE = Special exempt
- JE = Junior exempt
- JR = Junior Accelerator Programme entrant
- CO = College Accelerator Programme entrant
- NG = Next Gen Accelerator Program entrant
- w/o = Walkover
- r = Retired
- d = Defaulted

First round
1 | (South Korea) J-s Nam (Finland) P Niklas-Salminen | 7^{7} | 6
WC | (Japan) Naoya Honda (Japan) H Matsuoka | 6^{5} | 1
WC | (Japan) Masakatsu Noguchi (Japan) Ryotaro Taguchi | 6 | 3 | [9]
(Australia) Ethan Cook (Australia) Tai Sach | 4 | 6 | [11]
3 | (India) J Nedunchezhiyan (India) R Ramanathan | 2 | 4
(Japan) Y Kusuhara (Japan) S Nakagawa | 6 | 6
(Japan) M Imamura (Japan) Ryuki Matsuda | 3 | 4
(Chinese Taipei) J Hsu (United States) Andre Ilagan | 6 | 6
Alt | (Japan) Yuki Mochizuki (Thailand) K Samrej | 3 | 4
(Japan) Y Shimizu (Japan) J Trotter | 6 | 6
Alt | (Japan) Yuto Oki (Japan) Ryo Tabata | 6^{5} | 3
4 | (Chinese Taipei) J Jung (Japan) K Uesugi | 7^{7} | 6
(Japan) Takuya Kumasaka (Japan) Koki Matsuda | 6 | 6
(China) F Sun (Chinese Taipei) T-l Wu | 2 | 4
Alt | (United Kingdom) L Broady (United Kingdom) H Wendelken | 6 | 6
5 | (France) D Added (Japan) N Tajima | 2 | 3

Quarterfinals
1 | (South Korea) J-s Nam (Finland) P Niklas-Salminen | 3 | 6 | [10]
(Australia) E Cook (Australia) T Sach | 6 | 4 | [7]
(Japan) Y Kusuhara (Japan) S Nakagawa | 6 | 7
(Chinese Taipei) J Hsu (United States) A Ilagan | 3 | 5
(Japan) Y Shimizu (Japan) J Trotter | 6 | 5 | [10]
4 | (Chinese Taipei) J Jung (Japan) K Uesugi | 3 | 7 | [6]
(Japan) T Kumasaka (Japan) K Matsuda | 4 | 2
Alt | (United Kingdom) L Broady (United Kingdom) H Wendelken | 6 | 6

Semifinals
1 | (South Korea) J-s Nam (Finland) P Niklas-Salminen | 6 | 7^{8}
(Japan) Y Kusuhara (Japan) S Nakagawa | 3 | 6^{6}
(Japan) Y Shimizu (Japan) J Trotter | 6 | 6^{4} | [10]
Alt | (United Kingdom) L Broady (United Kingdom) H Wendelken | 3 | 7^{7} | [7]

Final
1 | (South Korea) J-s Nam (Finland) P Niklas-Salminen | 7 | 6
(Japan) Y Shimizu (Japan) J Trotter | 5 | 3
