= 2022 Challenger Biel/Bienne – Doubles =

Doubles
- 2022 Challenger Biel/Bienne

Final
- Champions: (France) Pierre-Hugues Herbert (France) Albano Olivetti
- Runners-up: (India) Purav Raja (India) Ramkumar Ramanathan
- Score: 6–3, 6–4

Events
Singles	Doubles
← 2021 ·	Challenger Biel/Bienne	· 2023 →

Ruben Bemelmans and Daniel Masur were the defending champions but lost in the first round to Marc-Andrea Hüsler and Dominic Stricker.

Pierre-Hugues Herbert and Albano Olivetti won the title after defeating Purav Raja and Ramkumar Ramanathan 6–3, 6–4 in the final.

== Seeds ==
1. (France) Pierre-Hugues Herbert / (France) Albano Olivetti (champions)
2. (United States) Robert Galloway / (United States) Jackson Withrow (first round)
3. (Austria) Alexander Erler / (Austria) Lucas Miedler (first round)
4. (United States) Hunter Reese / (Netherlands) Sem Verbeek (quarterfinals)

== Draw ==
=== Key ===
- Q = Qualifier
- WC = Wild card
- LL = Lucky loser
- Alt = Alternate
- SE = Special exempt
- PR = Protected ranking
- ITF = ITF entry
- JE = Junior exempt
- w/o = Walkover
- r = Retired
- d = Defaulted
- SR = Special ranking

First round
1	(France) P-H Herbert (France) A Olivetti	6^{9}	6	[10]
E Karlovskiy; P Kotov	7^{11}	3	[6]
(Austria) J Rodionov (Poland) K Żuk	3	6	[4]
(Romania) VV Cornea (Germany) F Fallert	6	2	[10]
3	(Austria) A Erler (Austria) L Miedler	3	3
WC	(Switzerland) J Kym (Switzerland) L Riedi	6	6
(Belgium) R Bemelmans (Germany) D Masur	5	0
(Switzerland) M-A Hüsler (Switzerland) D Stricker	7	6
PR	(China) Z Li (Japan) G Soeda	4	4
(India) P Raja (India) R Ramanathan	6	6
(Philippines) R Gonzales (Switzerland) L Margaroli	5	4
4	(United States) H Reese (Netherlands) S Verbeek	7	6
Alt	(France) D Added (Greece) M Pervolarakis	6	6
(Poland) K Drzewiecki (Poland) S Walków	1	1
WC	(Switzerland) J Paul (Switzerland) Yannik Steinegger	6	1	[10]
2	(United States) R Galloway (United States) J Withrow	4	6	[7]

Quarterfinals
1	(France) P-H Herbert (France) A Olivetti	6	7^{7}
(Romania) VV Cornea (Germany) F Fallert	4	6^{2}
WC	(Switzerland) J Kym (Switzerland) L Riedi	4	6^{4}
(Switzerland) M-A Hüsler (Switzerland) D Stricker	6	7^{7}
(India) P Raja (India) R Ramanathan	6	6
4	(United States) H Reese (Netherlands) S Verbeek	3	4
Alt	(France) D Added (Greece) M Pervolarakis	6	3	[10]
WC	(Switzerland) J Paul (Switzerland) Y Steinegger	1	6	[7]

Semifinals
1	(France) P-H Herbert (France) A Olivetti	4	6	[10]
(Switzerland) M-A Hüsler (Switzerland) D Stricker	6	3	[5]
(India) P Raja (India) R Ramanathan	6	6
Alt	(France) D Added (Greece) M Pervolarakis	1	4

Final
1	(France) P-H Herbert (France) A Olivetti	6	6
(India) P Raja (India) R Ramanathan	3	4
