= 2023 Challenger Biel/Bienne =

- Date: 20–26 March
- Edition: 3rd
- Surface: Hard (indoor)
- Location: Biel/Bienne, Switzerland

Champions

Singles
- (Austria) Jurij Rodionov

Doubles
- (Germany) Constantin Frantzen / (Germany) Hendrik Jebens
- Challenger Biel/Bienne

The 2023 FlowBank Biel/Bienne Challenger was a professional tennis tournament played on indoor hardcourts. It was the third edition of the tournament which was part of the 2023 ATP Challenger Tour. It took place in Biel/Bienne, Switzerland between 20 and 26 March 2023.

== Singles main-draw entrants ==
=== Seeds ===
Country	Player	Rank^{1}	Seed
SUI	Dominic Stricker	126	1
AUT	Jurij Rodionov	131	2
SVK	Norbert Gombos	133	3
GBR	Liam Broady	142	4
FIN	Otto Virtanen	170	5
CZE	Zdeněk Kolář	178	6
SUI	Alexander Ritschard	195	7
CAN	Gabriel Diallo	213	8

- ^{1} Rankings are as of 6 March 2023.

=== Other entrants ===
The following players received wildcards into the singles main draw:

- (Switzerland) Mika Brunold
- (Switzerland) Dylan Dietrich
- (Switzerland) Jakub Paul

The following player received entry into the singles main draw using a protected ranking:

- (United States) Thai-Son Kwiatkowski

The following players received entry from the qualifying draw:

- (Romania) Marius Copil
- (Israel) Daniel Cukierman
- (Italy) Enrico Dalla Valle
- (Italy) Francesco Forti
- Kirill Kivattsev
- (Austria) Neil Oberleitner

The following player received entry as a lucky loser:

- (Germany) Max Hans Rehberg

== Champions ==
=== Singles ===
- (Austria) Jurij Rodionov def. (United Kingdom) Liam Broady 6–3, 0–0 ret.

=== Doubles ===
- (Germany) Constantin Frantzen / (Germany) Hendrik Jebens def. (Romania) Victor Vlad Cornea / (Croatia) Franko Škugor 6–2, 6–4.
