= 2021 Challenger Biel/Bienne – Doubles =

Doubles
- 2021 Challenger Biel/Bienne

Final
- Champions: (Belgium) Ruben Bemelmans (Germany) Daniel Masur
- Runners-up: (Switzerland) Marc-Andrea Hüsler (Switzerland) Dominic Stricker
- Score: Walkover

Events
Singles	Doubles
Challenger Biel/Bienne	· 2022 →

This was the first edition of the tournament.

Ruben Bemelmans and Daniel Masur won the title by walkover after Marc-Andrea Hüsler and Dominic Stricker withdrew before the final.

== Seeds ==
1. (Philippines) Treat Huey / (Denmark) Frederik Nielsen (semifinals)
2. (Switzerland) Marc-Andrea Hüsler / (Switzerland) Dominic Stricker (final, withdrew)
3. (France) Pierre-Hugues Herbert / (Switzerland) Leandro Riedi (first round, withdrew)
4. (Belgium) Ruben Bemelmans / (Germany) Daniel Masur (champions)

== Draw ==
=== Key ===
- Q = Qualifier
- WC = Wild card
- LL = Lucky loser
- Alt = Alternate
- ITF = ITF entry
- PR = Protected ranking
- SR = Special ranking
- SE = Special exempt
- JE = Junior exempt
- JR = Junior Accelerator Programme entrant
- CO = College Accelerator Programme entrant
- NG = Next Gen Accelerator Program entrant
- w/o = Walkover
- r = Retired
- d = Defaulted

First round
1	(Philippines) T Huey (Denmark) F Nielsen	6^{5}	6	[10]
(Czech Republic) M Gengel (Austria) M Neuchrist	7^{7}	2	[2]
4	(Belgium) R Bemelmans (Germany) D Masur	6	3	[13]
(Romania) VV Cornea (Greece) Pe Tsitsipas	4	6	[11]
(France) M Janvier (India) A Kadhe	7^{7}	7^{7}
Alt	(Japan) T Matsui (Japan) K Uesugi	6^{4}	6^{3}
(United Kingdom) L Broady (United Kingdom) L Johnson	7^{8}	6^{4}	[10]
WC	(Russia) A Kuznetsov (Switzerland) J Kym	6^{6}	7^{7}	[8]
(Croatia) B Gojo (Bulgaria) D Kuzmanov	w/o
3	(France) P-H Herbert (Switzerland) L Riedi
(Germany) M Moraing (Austria) D Novak	6^{0}	3
(Ukraine) V Manafov (Poland) P Matuszewski	7^{7}	6
WC	(Switzerland) Louroi Martinez (Switzerland) Mirko Martinez	6	2	[4]
2	(Switzerland) M-A Hüsler (Switzerland) D Stricker	3	6	[10]

Quarterfinals
1	(Philippines) T Huey (Denmark) F Nielsen	6	1	[10]
(Switzerland) J Paul (Switzerland) Yannik Steinegger	4	6	[4]
4	(Belgium) R Bemelmans (Germany) D Masur	6	6
(France) M Janvier (India) A Kadhe	4	4
(United Kingdom) L Broady (United Kingdom) L Johnson	w/o
(Croatia) B Gojo (Bulgaria) D Kuzmanov
(Ukraine) V Manafov (Poland) P Matuszewski	5	6^{0}
2	(Switzerland) M-A Hüsler (Switzerland) D Stricker	7	7^{7}

Semifinals
1	(Philippines) T Huey (Denmark) F Nielsen	4	5
4	(Belgium) R Bemelmans (Germany) D Masur	6	7
(United Kingdom) L Broady (United Kingdom) L Johnson	3	3
2	(Switzerland) M-A Hüsler (Switzerland) D Stricker	6	6

Final
4	(Belgium) R Bemelmans (Germany) D Masur	w/o
2	(Switzerland) M-A Hüsler (Switzerland) D Stricker
