= 2026 Miyazaki Challenger =

- Date: 30 March – 5 April
- Edition: 1st
- Surface: Hard
- Location: Miyazaki, Japan

Champions

Singles
- (United Kingdom) Liam Broady

Doubles
- (South Korea) Nam Ji-sung / (Finland) Patrik Niklas-Salminen
- Miyazaki Challenger

The 2026 Koyushokucho Miyazaki Challenger was a professional tennis tournament played on hardcourts. It was the first edition of the tournament which was part of the 2026 ATP Challenger Tour. It took place in Miyazaki, Japan between 30 March and 5 April 2026.

== Singles main-draw entrants ==
=== Seeds ===
Country	Player	Rank^{1}	Seed
DEN	August Holmgren	197	1
FRA	Dan Added	204	2
TPE	Hsu Yu-hsiou	215	3
CHN	Zhou Yi	221	4
JPN	Kaichi Uchida	236	5
JPN	Rio Noguchi	245	6
GBR	Harry Wendelken	250	7
CHN	Sun Fajing	264	8

- ^{1} Rankings are as of 16 March 2026.

=== Other entrants ===
The following players received wildcards into the singles main draw:

- (Japan) Naoya Honda
- (Japan) Yuto Oki
- (Japan) Ryotaro Taguchi

The following player received entry into the singles main draw using a protected ranking:

- (Australia) Blake Ellis

The following player received entry into the singles main draw through the Next Gen Accelerator programme:

- (Serbia) Ognjen Milić

The following players received entry from the qualifying draw:

- (Canada) Justin Boulais
- (Japan) Koki Matsuda
- (Japan) Hiroki Moriya
- (South Korea) Nam Ji-sung
- (Denmark) Carl Emil Overbeck
- (Australia) Li Tu

The following player received entry as a lucky loser:

- (Japan) Yusuke Takahashi

== Champions ==
=== Singles ===
- (United Kingdom) Liam Broady def. (United Kingdom) Harry Wendelken 3–6, 6–2, 6–2.

=== Doubles ===
- (South Korea) Nam Ji-sung / (Finland) Patrik Niklas-Salminen def. (Japan) Yuta Shimizu / (Japan) James Trotter 7–5, 6–3.
