= 2022 Challenger Biel/Bienne – Singles =

Singles
- 2022 Challenger Biel/Bienne

Final
- Champion: (Austria) Jurij Rodionov
- Runner-up: (Poland) Kacper Żuk
- Score: 7–6^{(7–3)}, 6–4

Events
Singles	Doubles
- Challenger Biel/Bienne

Liam Broady was the defending champion but chose not to defend his title.

Jurij Rodionov won the title after defeating Kacper Żuk 7–6^{(7–3)}, 6–4 in the final.

== Seeds ==
1. (France) Pierre-Hugues Herbert (first round)
2. (Austria) Dennis Novak (first round)
3. (Switzerland) Dominic Stricker (semifinals)
4. (Turkey) Altuğ Çelikbilek (withdrew)
5. Pavel Kotov (second round)
6. (Germany) Daniel Masur (first round)
7. (Switzerland) Marc-Andrea Hüsler (first round)
8. (Netherlands) Tim van Rijthoven (quarterfinals)

== Draw ==
Key

- Q = Qualifier
- WC = Wild card
- LL = Lucky loser
- Alt = Alternate
- ITF = ITF entry
- PR = Protected ranking
- SR = Special ranking
- SE = Special exempt
- JE = Junior exempt
- JR = Junior Accelerator Programme entrant
- CO = College Accelerator Programme entrant
- NG = Next Gen Accelerator Program entrant
- w/o = Walkover
- r = Retired
- d = Defaulted

=== Finals ===
Semifinals
(Slovakia) Filip Horanský	6	4	4
(Austria) Jurij Rodionov	0	6	6
3	(Switzerland) Dominic Stricker	3	4
(Poland) Kacper Żuk	6	6

Final
(Austria) Jurij Rodionov	7^{7}	6
(Poland) Kacper Żuk	6^{3}	4

=== Top half ===
First round
1	(France) P-H Herbert	7^{7}	3	3
(Croatia) B Gojo	6^{0}	6	6
(Belgium) R Bemelmans	6^{4}	6^{3}
Q	(Czech Republic) M Gengel	7^{7}	7^{7}
(Slovakia) F Horanský	6	6
WC	(Switzerland) J Kym	3	3
WC	(Switzerland) K Feldbausch	7	6
7	(Switzerland) M-A Hüsler	5	0
Q	(Netherlands) G Brouwer	6	3	4
WC	(Switzerland) L Riedi	1	6	6
Q	(Finland) O Virtanen	7^{10}	6
(Japan) H Moriya	6^{8}	4
LL	(Bosnia and Herzegovina) A Šetkić	3	4
(Austria) J Rodionov	6	6
Q	(Netherlands) J Sels	6	4	6
6	(Germany) D Masur	3	6	3

Second round
(Croatia) B Gojo	6^{6}	6	1
Q	(Czech Republic) M Gengel	7^{8}	4	6
(Slovakia) F Horanský	7^{8}	7^{7}
WC	(Switzerland) K Feldbausch	6^{6}	6^{5}
WC	(Switzerland) L Riedi	6	6
Q	(Finland) O Virtanen	4	4
(Austria) J Rodionov	6	6
Q	(Netherlands) J Sels	4	4

Quarterfinals
Q	(Czech Republic) M Gengel	4	3
(Slovakia) F Horanský	6	6
WC	(Switzerland) L Riedi	4	4
(Austria) J Rodionov	6	6

Semifinals
(Slovakia) F Horanský	6	4	4
(Austria) J Rodionov	0	6	6

=== Bottom half ===
First round
8	(Netherlands) T van Rijthoven	7^{7}	7
Q	(Ukraine) G Kravchenko	6^{4}	5
E Karlovskiy	6^{5}	6	7
(Canada) B Schnur	7^{7}	3	5
PR	(China) Z Li	5	3
Q	(United States) A Kovacevic	7	6
(Japan) Y Sugita	6^{5}	1
3	(Switzerland) D Stricker	7^{7}	6
5	P Kotov	7^{9}	6
(United Kingdom) R Peniston	6^{7}	4
(Poland) K Żuk	6	6
PR	(Japan) G Soeda	3	2
LL	(Spain) A Menéndez Maceiras	2	3
(Romania) M Copil	6	6
(France) A Escoffier	6	6
2	(Austria) D Novak	4	2

Second round
8	(Netherlands) T van Rijthoven	6	7
E Karlovskiy	2	5
Q	(United States) A Kovacevic	4	6^{3}
3	(Switzerland) D Stricker	6	7^{7}
5	P Kotov	4	4
(Poland) K Żuk	6	6
(Romania) M Copil	4	6	6^{3}
(France) A Escoffier	6	3	7^{7}

Quarterfinals
8	(Netherlands) T van Rijthoven	4	5
3	(Switzerland) D Stricker	6	7
(Poland) K Żuk	7^{7}	6
(France) A Escoffier	6^{2}	2

Semifinals
3	(Switzerland) D Stricker	3	4
(Poland) K Żuk	6	6
