= 2022 Challenger Biel/Bienne =

- Date: 21–27 March
- Edition: 2nd
- Surface: Hard (indoor)
- Location: Biel/Bienne, Switzerland

Champions

Singles
- (Austria) Jurij Rodionov

Doubles
- (France) Pierre-Hugues Herbert / (France) Albano Olivetti
- Challenger Biel/Bienne

The 2022 FlowBank Challenger Biel/Bienne was a professional tennis tournament played on indoor hard courts. It was the second edition of the tournament which was part of the 2022 ATP Challenger Tour. It took place in Biel/Bienne, Switzerland between 21 and 27 March 2022.

== Singles main-draw entrants ==
=== Seeds ===
Country	Player	Rank^{1}	Seed
FRA	Pierre-Hugues Herbert	111	1
AUT	Dennis Novak	140	2
SUI	Dominic Stricker	155	3
~~TUR~~	~~Altuğ Çelikbilek~~	~~162~~	~~4~~
	Pavel Kotov	168	5
GER	Daniel Masur	176	6
SUI	Marc-Andrea Hüsler	179	7
NED	Tim van Rijthoven	180	8

- ^{1} Rankings are as of 14 March 2022.

=== Other entrants ===
The following players received wildcards into the singles main draw:

- (Switzerland) Kilian Feldbausch
- (Switzerland) Jérôme Kym
- (Switzerland) Leandro Riedi

The following players received entry into the singles main draw using protected rankings:

- (China) Li Zhe
- (Japan) Go Soeda

The following players received entry from the qualifying draw:

- (Netherlands) Gijs Brouwer
- (Czech Republic) Marek Gengel
- (United States) Aleksandar Kovacevic
- (Ukraine) Georgii Kravchenko
- (Netherlands) Jelle Sels
- (Finland) Otto Virtanen

The following players received entry as lucky losers:

- (Spain) Adrián Menéndez Maceiras
- (Bosnia and Herzegovina) Aldin Šetkić

== Champions ==
=== Singles ===
- (Austria) Jurij Rodionov def. (Poland) Kacper Żuk 7–6^{(7–3)}, 6–4.

=== Doubles ===
- (France) Pierre-Hugues Herbert / (France) Albano Olivetti def. (India) Purav Raja / (India) Ramkumar Ramanathan 6–3, 6–4.
