= 2026 Miyazaki Challenger – Singles =

Singles
- 2026 Miyazaki Challenger

Final
- Champion: (United Kingdom) Liam Broady
- Runner-up: (United Kingdom) Harry Wendelken
- Score: 3–6, 6–2, 6–2

Events
Singles	Doubles
- Miyazaki Challenger

This was the first edition of the tournament.

Liam Broady won the title after defeating Harry Wendelken 3–6, 6–2, 6–2 in the final.

== Seeds ==
1. (Denmark) August Holmgren (first round)
2. (France) Dan Added (first round)
3. (Chinese Taipei) Hsu Yu-hsiou (quarterfinals)
4. (China) Zhou Yi (second round)
5. (Japan) Kaichi Uchida (first round)
6. (Japan) Rio Noguchi (first round)
7. (United Kingdom) Harry Wendelken (final)
8. (China) Sun Fajing (first round)

== Draw ==
Key

- Q = Qualifier
- WC = Wild card
- LL = Lucky loser
- Alt = Alternate
- ITF = ITF entry
- PR = Protected ranking
- SR = Special ranking
- SE = Special exempt
- JE = Junior exempt
- JR = Junior Accelerator Programme entrant
- CO = College Accelerator Programme entrant
- NG = Next Gen Accelerator Program entrant
- w/o = Walkover
- r = Retired
- d = Defaulted

=== Finals ===
Semifinals
(United Kingdom) Liam Broady	7^{7}	6
PR	(Australia) Blake Ellis	6^{2}	2
7	(United Kingdom) Harry Wendelken	6	3	6
(Chinese Taipei) Wu Tung-lin	3	6	3

Final
(United Kingdom) Liam Broady	3	6	6
7	(United Kingdom) Harry Wendelken	6	2	2

=== Top half ===
First round
1	(Denmark) A Holmgren	6	4	6^{4}
WC	(Japan) Yuto Oki	4	6	7^{7}
(Japan) Y Shimizu	5	3
(United States) Andre Ilagan	7	6
(Japan) H Matsuoka	7^{7}	6
(Thailand) K Samrej	6^{4}	3
(United Kingdom) L Broady	7^{7}	6
5	(Japan) K Uchida	6^{3}	1
4	(China) Y Zhou	6	6
LL	(Japan) Y Takahashi	1	3
Q	(Denmark) CE Overbeck	4	6^{4}
NG	(Serbia) O Milić	6	7^{7}
PR	(Australia) B Ellis	2	7^{7}	7^{7}
WC	(Japan) Naoya Honda	6	6^{5}	6^{3}
(Thailand) M Jones	6	6
8	(China) F Sun	2	1

Second round
WC	(Japan) Y Oki	1	2^{r}
(United States) A Ilagan	6	3
(Japan) H Matsuoka	7^{7}	1	2
(United Kingdom) L Broady	6^{4}	6	6
4	(China) Y Zhou	5	3
NG	(Serbia) O Milić	7	6
PR	(Australia) B Ellis	6	1	6
(Thailand) M Jones	4	6	2

Quarterfinals
(United States) A Ilagan	4	1
(United Kingdom) L Broady	6	6
NG	(Serbia) O Milić	6	1^{r}
PR	(Australia) B Ellis	2	2

Semifinals
(United Kingdom) L Broady	7^{7}	6
PR	(Australia) B Ellis	6^{2}	2

=== Bottom half ===
First round
7	(United Kingdom) H Wendelken	7	7
Q	(Canada) J Boulais	5	5
Q	(South Korea) J-s Nam	4	2
(United States) B Shick	6	6
(Australia) O Jasika	7^{7}	6
Q	(Australia) L Tu	6^{2}	4
(Japan) Renta Tokuda	5	0
3	(Chinese Taipei) Y-h Hsu	7	6
6	(Japan) R Noguchi	3	2
(Chinese Taipei) T-l Wu	6	6
WC	(Japan) Ryotaro Taguchi	6	1	4
(United Kingdom) P Jubb	4	6	6
Q	(Japan) H Moriya	4	6	6
Q	(Japan) Koki Matsuda	6	4	0
(Japan) J Trotter	6	6
2	(France) D Added	4	2

Second round
7	(United Kingdom) H Wendelken	6	6
(United States) B Shick	4	4
(Australia) O Jasika	4	7	3
3	(Chinese Taipei) Y-h Hsu	6	5	6
(Chinese Taipei) T-l Wu	7^{8}	2	7^{8}
(United Kingdom) P Jubb	6^{6}	6	6^{6}
Q	(Japan) H Moriya	7^{7}	6
(Japan) J Trotter	6^{4}	4

Quarterfinals
7	(United Kingdom) H Wendelken	6	6
3	(Chinese Taipei) Y-h Hsu	3	3
(Chinese Taipei) T-l Wu	7^{9}	7^{7}
Q	(Japan) H Moriya	6^{7}	6^{1}

Semifinals
7	(United Kingdom) H Wendelken	6	3	6
(Chinese Taipei) T-l Wu	3	6	3
