= 2021 Challenger Biel/Bienne – Singles =

Singles
- 2021 Challenger Biel/Bienne

Final
- Champion: (United Kingdom) Liam Broady
- Runner-up: (Switzerland) Marc-Andrea Hüsler
- Score: 7–5, 6–3

Events
Singles	Doubles
Challenger Biel/Bienne	· 2022 →

This was the first edition of the tournament.

Liam Broady won the title after defeating Marc-Andrea Hüsler 7–5, 6–3 in the final.

== Seeds ==
1. (France) Pierre-Hugues Herbert (withdrew)
2. (Switzerland) Henri Laaksonen (second round)
3. (Austria) Dennis Novak (second round)
4. (Czech Republic) Tomáš Macháč (first round)
5. (United Kingdom) Liam Broady (champion)
6. (Portugal) João Sousa (quarterfinals)
7. (Switzerland) Marc-Andrea Hüsler (final)
8. (Turkey) Cem İlkel (second round)

== Draw ==
=== Key ===
- Q = Qualifier
- WC = Wild card
- LL = Lucky loser
- Alt = Alternate
- SE = Special exempt
- PR = Protected ranking
- ITF = ITF entry
- JE = Junior exempt
- w/o = Walkover
- r = Retired
- d = Defaulted
- SR = Special ranking

=== Finals ===
Semifinals
7	(Switzerland) Marc-Andrea Hüsler	3	7^{12}	6
(Netherlands) Tim van Rijthoven	6	6^{10}	4
5	(United Kingdom) Liam Broady	6	2
WC	(Switzerland) Dominic Stricker	0	0^{r}

Final
7	(Switzerland) Marc-Andrea Hüsler	5	3
5	(United Kingdom) Liam Broady	7	6

=== Top half ===
First round
LL	(Russia) A Shevchenko	7^{7}	6
(Japan) G Soeda	6^{1}	4
Q	(France) A Escoffier	6	6
WC	(Switzerland) J Kym	4	1
WC	(Switzerland) L Riedi	2	6	0
(France) E Couacaud	6	4	6
(Belgium) R Bemelmans	3	6	6^{5}
7	(Switzerland) M-A Hüsler	6	3	7^{7}
3	(Austria) D Novak	6	6
Alt	(Germany) M Bachinger	4	2
(Netherlands) T van Rijthoven	6	6
Q	(Japan) H Moriya	1	3
Q	(Switzerland) J Paul	4	4
Q	(United States) A Ritschard	6	6
(Croatia) B Gojo	5	5
6	(Portugal) J Sousa	7	7

Second round
LL	(Russia) A Shevchenko	4	6^{3}
Q	(France) A Escoffier	6	7^{7}
(France) E Couacaud	4	4
7	(Switzerland) M-A Hüsler	6	6
3	(Austria) D Novak	7^{7}	3	6^{1}
(Netherlands) T van Rijthoven	6^{5}	6	7^{7}
Q	(United States) A Ritschard	3	2
6	(Portugal) J Sousa	6	6

Quarterfinals
Q	(France) A Escoffier	7	1	2
7	(Switzerland) M-A Hüsler	5	6	6
(Netherlands) T van Rijthoven	7^{7}	6
6	(Portugal) J Sousa	6^{4}	4

Semifinals
7	(Switzerland) M-A Hüsler	3	7^{12}	6
(Netherlands) T van Rijthoven	6	6^{10}	4

=== Bottom half ===
First round
5	(United Kingdom) L Broady	7	6
Alt	(Russia) A Kuznetsov	5	3
(Germany) D Masur	6	4	3
(France) H Grenier	3	6	6
(Slovakia) L Klein	7	4	4
(Germany) M Moraing	5	6	6
(India) R Ramanathan	6	6
4	(Czech Republic) T Macháč	3	2
8	(Turkey) C İlkel	7^{7}	7^{7}
(Italy) M Viola	6^{3}	6^{1}
(Germany) T Kamke	6	7^{7}
(Bulgaria) D Kuzmanov	4	6^{0}
(France) M Janvier	4	5
WC	(Switzerland) D Stricker	6	7
(Slovakia) L Lacko	5	2
2	(Switzerland) H Laaksonen	7	6

Second round
5	(United Kingdom) L Broady	6	6
(France) H Grenier	4	3
(Germany) M Moraing	2	3
(India) R Ramanathan	6	6
8	(Turkey) C İlkel	4	6^{3}
(Germany) T Kamke	6	7^{7}
WC	(Switzerland) D Stricker	6	4	6
2	(Switzerland) H Laaksonen	1	6	3

Quarterfinals
5	(United Kingdom) L Broady	7^{7}	6
(India) R Ramanathan	6^{2}	2
(Germany) T Kamke	4	4
WC	(Switzerland) D Stricker	6	6

Semifinals
5	(United Kingdom) L Broady	6	2
WC	(Switzerland) D Stricker	0	0^{r}
