= 2022 Traralgon International =

Tennis tournament

- Date: 3–9 January 2022
- Edition: 7th (women); 9th (men)
- Category: ATP Challenger Tour; ITF Women's World Tennis Tour
- Prize money: $58,320 (men) $60,000+H (women)
- Surface: Hard
- Location: Traralgon, Australia

Champions

Men's singles
- (Czech Republic) Tomáš Macháč

Women's singles
- (China) Yuan Yue

Men's doubles
- (France) Manuel Guinard / (Czech Republic) Zdeněk Kolář

Women's doubles
- (United States) Emina Bektas / (United Kingdom) Tara Moore
← 2019 ·	Traralgon International	· 2023 →

The 2022 Traralgon International was a professional tennis tournament played on outdoor hard courts. It was the seventh (women) and ninth (men) editions of the tournament which was part of the 2022 ATP Challenger Tour and the 2022 ITF Women's World Tennis Tour. It took place in Traralgon, Australia between 3 and 9 January 2022.

== Men's singles main-draw entrants ==
=== Seeds ===
Country	Player	Rank^{1}	Seed
FRA	Gilles Simon	122	1
CZE	Jiří Lehečka	141	2
CZE	Zdeněk Kolář	142	3
CZE	Tomáš Macháč	143	4
USA	Bjorn Fratangelo	165	5
USA	Mitchell Krueger	169	6
USA	J. J. Wolf	174	7
KAZ	Mikhail Kukushkin	182	8
SUI	Marc-Andrea Hüsler	186	9
SVK	Filip Horanský	195	10
BEL	Kimmer Coppejans	208	11
NED	Jesper de Jong	226	12
GER	Maximilian Marterer	229	13
NED	Robin Haase	230	14
FRA	Geoffrey Blancaneaux	235	15
ARG	Juan Pablo Ficovich	236	16

- ^{1} Rankings are as of 27 December 2021.

=== Other entrants ===
The following players received wildcards into the singles main draw:

- (Australia) Joshua Charlton
- (Australia) Blake Ellis
- (Australia) Jeremy Jin
- (Australia) Philip Sekulic
- (France) Gilles Simon

The following player received entry as an alternate into the singles main draw:

- (Australia) Brandon Walkin

The following players received entry from the qualifying draw:

- (Latvia) Ernests Gulbis
- (Australia) Calum Puttergill
- (India) Divij Sharan
- (New Zealand) Rubin Statham

The following players received entry as lucky losers:

- (Australia) Patrick Fitzgerald
- (Australia) David Hough

== Women's singles main-draw entrants ==
=== Seeds ===
Country	Player	Rank^{1}	Seed
CHN	Wang Xiyu	131	1
USA	Katie Volynets	180	2
USA	Usue Maitane Arconada	181	3
GRE	Valentini Grammatikopoulou	183	4
AUT	Julia Grabher	184	5
JPN	Kurumi Nara	185	6
BRA	Laura Pigossi	191	7
FRA	Jessika Ponchet	197	8

- ^{1} Rankings are as of 27 December 2021.

=== Other entrants ===
The following players received wildcards into the singles main draw:

- (Australia) Isabella Bozicevic
- (Australia) Roisin Gilheany
- (Australia) Lisa Mays
- (Australia) Annerly Poulos

The following player received entry using a protected ranking:

- (United Kingdom) Samantha Murray Sharan

The following players received entry from the qualifying draw:

- (United States) Emina Bektas
- (United States) Catherine Harrison
- (Netherlands) Richèl Hogenkamp
- (Czech Republic) Jesika Malečková
- (Russia) Marina Melnikova
- (United Kingdom) Tara Moore
- (Croatia) Tereza Mrdeža
- (Russia) Anastasia Zakharova

The following players received entry as lucky losers:

- (Belgium) Marie Benoît
- (Czech Republic) Miriam Kolodziejová
- (Spain) Andrea Lázaro García

== Champions ==
=== Men's singles ===
- (Czech Republic) Tomáš Macháč def. (United States) Bjorn Fratangelo 7–6^{(7–2)}, 6–3.

=== Women's singles ===
- (China) Yuan Yue def. (Argentina) Paula Ormaechea, 6–3, 6–2

=== Men's doubles ===
- (France) Manuel Guinard / (Czech Republic) Zdeněk Kolář def. (Switzerland) Marc-Andrea Hüsler / (Switzerland) Dominic Stricker 6–3, 6–4.

=== Women's doubles ===
- (United States) Emina Bektas / (United Kingdom) Tara Moore def. (United States) Catherine Harrison / (Indonesia) Aldila Sutjiadi, 0–6, 7–6^{(7–1)}, [10–8]
