= 2022 Traralgon International – Women's doubles =

Women's doubles
- 2022 Traralgon International

Final
- Champions: (United States) Emina Bektas (United Kingdom) Tara Moore
- Runners-up: (United States) Catherine Harrison (Indonesia) Aldila Sutjiadi
- Score: 0–6, 7–6^{(7–1)}, [10–8]

Events
Singles	men	women
Doubles	men	women
← 2012 ·	Traralgon International	· 2023 →

Cara Black and Arina Rodionova were the defending champions, having won the previous edition in 2012. However Black retired from professional tennis in 2015 and Rodionova chose to compete at the 2022 Melbourne Summer Set instead.

Emina Bektas and Tara Moore won the title, defeating Catherine Harrison and Aldila Sutjiadi in the final, 0–6, 7–6^{(7–1)}, [10–8].

== Seeds ==
1. (United States) Emina Bektas / (United Kingdom) Tara Moore (champions)
2. (United States) Catherine Harrison / (Indonesia) Aldila Sutjiadi (final)
3. (United Kingdom) Samantha Murray Sharan / (France) Jessika Ponchet (first round)
4. (Greece) Valentini Grammatikopoulou / (Russia) Anastasia Zakharova (quarterfinals)

== Draw ==
=== Key ===
- Q = Qualifier
- WC = Wild card
- LL = Lucky loser
- Alt = Alternate
- SE = Special exempt
- PR = Protected ranking
- ITF = ITF entry
- JE = Junior exempt
- w/o = Walkover
- r = Retired
- d = Defaulted
- SR = Special ranking

=== Draw ===
First round
1	(United States) E Bektas (United Kingdom) T Moore	7^{8}	6
(Brazil) C Alves (United States) S Vickery	6^{6}	2
(Australia) I Bozicevic (Australia) A Poulos	7^{7}	3	[10]
(Australia) L Fairclough (Australia) R Gilheany	6^{5}	6	[8]
4	(Greece) V Grammatikopoulou (Russia) A Zakharova	6	6
(Australia) J Board (Australia) E Dunbar	0	2
(Austria) J Grabher (Mexico) AS Sánchez
(Czech Republic) M Kolodziejová (Czech Republic) J Malečková	w/o
(United Kingdom) J Burrage (Switzerland) S Waltert
(Australia) P Freeman (Australia) Y Yan	w/o
(Russia) M Melnikova (United States) K Volynets	6^{2}	6	[10]
3	(United Kingdom) S Murray Sharan (France) J Ponchet	7^{7}	1	[6]
(Romania) A Cadanțu-Ignatik (Romania) G Lee
(Australia) S Leeson (Australia) S Rokusek	w/o
(Belgium) M Benoît (South Korea) S-j Jang	1	4
2	(United States) C Harrison (Indonesia) A Sutjiadi	6	6

Quarterfinals
1	(United States) E Bektas (United Kingdom) T Moore	6	6
(Australia) I Bozicevic (Australia) A Poulos	1	2
4	(Greece) V Grammatikopoulou (Russia) A Zakharova	7^{8}	2	[6]
(Czech Republic) M Kolodziejová (Czech Republic) J Malečková	6^{6}	6	[10]
(Australia) P Freeman (Australia) Y Yan	2	1
(Russia) M Melnikova (United States) K Volynets	6	6
(Australia) S Leeson (Australia) S Rokusek	2	0
2	(United States) C Harrison (Indonesia) A Sutjiadi	6	6

Semifinals
1	(United States) E Bektas (United Kingdom) T Moore	7	6
(Czech Republic) M Kolodziejová (Czech Republic) J Malečková	5	4
(Russia) M Melnikova (United States) K Volynets	6	2	[8]
2	(United States) C Harrison (Indonesia) A Sutjiadi	2	6	[10]

Final
1	(United States) E Bektas (United Kingdom) T Moore	0	7^{7}	[10]
2	(United States) C Harrison (Indonesia) A Sutjiadi	6	6^{1}	[8]
