= 2022 Traralgon International – Men's singles =

Men's singles
- 2022 Traralgon International

Final
- Champion: (Czech Republic) Tomáš Macháč
- Runner-up: (United States) Bjorn Fratangelo
- Score: 7–6^{(7–2)}, 6–3

Events
Singles	men	women
Doubles	men	women
← 2019 ·	Traralgon International	· 2023 →

Marc Polmans was the defending champion but chose not to participate.

Tomáš Macháč won the title after defeating Bjorn Fratangelo 7–6^{(7–2)}, 6–3 in the final.

== Seeds ==
All seeds receive a bye into the second round.

1. (France) Gilles Simon (quarterfinals)
2. (Czech Republic) Jiří Lehečka (quarterfinals)
3. (Czech Republic) Zdeněk Kolář (second round)
4. (Czech Republic) Tomáš Macháč (champion)
5. (United States) Bjorn Fratangelo (final)
6. (United States) Mitchell Krueger (semifinals)
7. (United States) J. J. Wolf (third round)
8. (Kazakhstan) Mikhail Kukushkin (quarterfinals)
9. (Switzerland) Marc-Andrea Hüsler (third round)
10. (Slovakia) Filip Horanský (third round)
11. (Belgium) Kimmer Coppejans (third round)
12. (Netherlands) Jesper de Jong (semifinals)
13. (Germany) Maximilian Marterer (third round)
14. (Netherlands) Robin Haase (second round)
15. (France) Geoffrey Blancaneaux (third round, retired)
16. (Argentina) Juan Pablo Ficovich (second round)

== Draw ==
=== Key ===
- Q = Qualifier
- WC = Wild card
- LL = Lucky loser
- Alt = Alternate
- SE = Special exempt
- PR = Protected ranking
- ITF = ITF entry
- JE = Junior exempt
- w/o = Walkover
- r = Retired
- d = Defaulted
- SR = Special ranking

=== Finals ===
Quarterfinals
1/WC	(France) Gilles Simon	4	1
12	(Netherlands) Jesper de Jong	6	6
4	(Czech Republic) Tomáš Macháč	3	6	6
8	(Kazakhstan) Mikhail Kukushkin	6	3	2
6	(United States) Mitchell Krueger	5	6	6
(Croatia) Nino Serdarušić	7	4	1
5	(United States) Bjorn Fratangelo	1	6	7^{7}
2	(Czech Republic) Jiří Lehečka	6	3	6^{5}

Semifinals
12	(Netherlands) Jesper de Jong	4	2
4	(Czech Republic) Tomáš Macháč	6	6
6	(United States) Mitchell Krueger	6^{6}	7^{8}	6^{8}
5	(United States) Bjorn Fratangelo	7^{8}	6^{6}	7^{10}

Final
4	(Czech Republic) Tomáš Macháč	7^{7}	6
5	(United States) Bjorn Fratangelo	6^{2}	3

=== Top half ===
==== Section 1 ====
First round
(Netherlands) T van Rijthoven	7^{7}	6
(Germany) T Kamke	6^{2}	2
(Ukraine) V Sachko	6	6
LL	(Australia) Patrick Fitzgerald	1	4
(Switzerland) D Stricker	6	6
Q	(India) D Sharan	4	2
Q	(Latvia) E Gulbis	6	3	5
(Japan) G Soeda	3	6	7

Second round
1/WC	(France) G Simon	6	6
(Netherlands) T van Rijthoven	0	2
(Ukraine) V Sachko	5	6^{5}
15	(France) G Blancaneaux	7	7^{7}
12	(Netherlands) J de Jong	7	6
(Switzerland) D Stricker	5	2
(Japan) G Soeda	2	6	4
7	(United States) J. J. Wolf	6	4	6

Third round
1/WC	(France) G Simon	6	2
15	(France) G Blancaneaux	0	1^{r}
12	(Netherlands) J de Jong	7^{7}	7^{12}
7	(United States) J. J. Wolf	6^{3}	6^{10}

Quarterfinals
1/WC	(France) G Simon	4	1
12	(Netherlands) J de Jong	6	6

==== Section 2 ====
First round
LL	(Australia) David Hough	1	2
(France) H Mayot	6	6
(Australia) A Santillan	7	6
(Czech Republic) L Rosol	5	4
(Australia) D Sweeny	6	6
(Portugal) F Ferreira Silva	4	4
(Japan) Yo Watanuki	6	7^{7}
WC	(Australia) Jeremy Jin	3	6^{1}

Second round
4	(Czech Republic) T Macháč	6	4	4
(France) H Mayot	2	6	1^{r}
(Australia) A Santillan	6	6
16	(Argentina) JP Ficovich	0	1
9	(Switzerland) M-A Hüsler	6	6
(Australia) D Sweeny	4	2
(Japan) Yo Watanuki	6^{4}	1
8	(Kazakhstan) M Kukushkin	7^{7}	6

Third round
4	(Czech Republic) T Macháč	6	6
(Australia) A Santillan	1	2
9	(Switzerland) M-A Hüsler	4	6^{6}
8	(Kazakhstan) M Kukushkin	6	7^{8}

Quarterfinals
4	(Czech Republic) T Macháč	3	6	6
8	(Kazakhstan) M Kukushkin	6	3	2

=== Bottom half ===
==== Section 3 ====
First round
(United Kingdom) R Peniston	4	4
(Kazakhstan) T Skatov	6	6
(Argentina) P Cachin	6	6
WC	(Australia) J Charlton	2	2
(Croatia) N Serdarušić	3	6	6
Q	(New Zealand) R Statham	6	3	2
WC	(Australia) P Sekulic	7^{7}	2	6^{4}
(Germany) N Kuhn	6^{5}	6	7^{7}

Second round
6	(United States) M Krueger	6	6
(Kazakhstan) T Skatov	1	0
(Argentina) P Cachin	7^{11}	6^{3}	3
11	(Belgium) K Coppejans	6^{9}	7^{7}	6
14	(Netherlands) R Haase	4	3
(Croatia) N Serdarušić	6	6
(Germany) N Kuhn	6	6
3	(Czech Republic) Z Kolář	3	4

Third round
6	(United States) M Krueger	6	6^{6}	6
11	(Belgium) K Coppejans	4	7^{8}	1
(Croatia) N Serdarušić	6	7^{10}
(Germany) N Kuhn	3	6^{8}

Quarterfinals
6	(United States) M Krueger	5	6	6
(Croatia) N Serdarušić	7	4	1

==== Section 4 ====
First round
Q	(Australia) C Puttergill	1	6	3
WC	(Australia) B Ellis	6	2	6
(Australia) H Bourchier	6	4	4
Alt	(Australia) B Walkin	3	6	6
(France) M Guinard	7^{7}	7^{7}
(Australia) T Schoolkate	6^{2}	6^{3}
(Belarus) U Ignatik	6	6
(Japan) H Moriya	1	3

Second round
5	(United States) B Fratangelo	6	6
WC	(Australia) B Ellis	4	1
Alt	(Australia) B Walkin	2	5
10	(Slovakia) F Horanský	6	7
13	(Germany) M Marterer	2	6	6
(France) M Guinard	6	3	4
(Belarus) U Ignatik	5	7^{7}	3
2	(Czech Republic) J Lehečka	7	6^{4}	6

Third round
5	(United States) B Fratangelo	6	7^{7}
10	(Slovakia) F Horanský	4	6^{5}
13	(Germany) M Marterer	6	1	5
2	(Czech Republic) J Lehečka	4	6	7

Quarterfinals
5	(United States) B Fratangelo	1	6	7^{7}
2	(Czech Republic) J Lehečka	6	3	6^{5}
