= 2023 Challenger Biel/Bienne – Singles =

Singles
- 2023 Challenger Biel/Bienne

Final
- Champion: (Austria) Jurij Rodionov
- Runner-up: (United Kingdom) Liam Broady
- Score: 6–3, 0–0 ret.

Events
Singles	Doubles
- Challenger Biel/Bienne

Jurij Rodionov was the defending champion and successfully defended his title after Liam Broady retired trailing 3–6, 0–0 in the final.

== Seeds ==
1. (Switzerland) Dominic Stricker (second round)
2. (Austria) Jurij Rodionov (champion)
3. (Slovakia) Norbert Gombos (quarterfinals)
4. (United Kingdom) Liam Broady (final, retired)
5. (Finland) Otto Virtanen (quarterfinals)
6. (Czech Republic) Zdeněk Kolář (first round)
7. (Switzerland) Alexander Ritschard (first round)
8. (Canada) Gabriel Diallo (quarterfinals)

== Draw ==
Key

- Q = Qualifier
- WC = Wild card
- LL = Lucky loser
- Alt = Alternate
- ITF = ITF entry
- PR = Protected ranking
- SR = Special ranking
- SE = Special exempt
- JE = Junior exempt
- JR = Junior Accelerator Programme entrant
- CO = College Accelerator Programme entrant
- NG = Next Gen Accelerator Program entrant
- w/o = Walkover
- r = Retired
- d = Defaulted

=== Finals ===
Semifinals
Q	(Romania) Marius Copil	3	4
4	(United Kingdom) Liam Broady	6	6
(Lebanon) Benjamin Hassan	3	5
2	(Austria) Jurij Rodionov	6	7

Final
4	(United Kingdom) Liam Broady	3	0^{r}
2	(Austria) Jurij Rodionov	6	0

=== Top half ===
First round
1	(Switzerland) D Stricker	7^{7}	7^{7}
(Kazakhstan) B Zhukayev	6^{2}	6^{5}
Q	(Romania) M Copil	6	6
(Czech Republic) M Gengel	4	3
LL	(Germany) MH Rehberg	6	6^{5}	6
(Germany) D Masur	3	7^{7}	3
WC	(Switzerland) M Brunold	6	6
6	(Czech Republic) Z Kolář	1	4
4	(United Kingdom) L Broady	6	6
(Norway) V Durasovic	1	4
(Australia) O Jasika	4	4
(Austria) M Neuchrist	6	6
Q	Kirill Kivattsev	6	6^{5}	6
(Bulgaria) A Lazarov	4	7^{7}	3
WC	(Switzerland) D Dietrich	6	1	4
8	(Canada) G Diallo	4	6	6

Second round
1	(Switzerland) D Stricker	6	2	6^{3}
Q	(Romania) M Copil	3	6	7^{7}
LL	(Germany) MH Rehberg	2	6	3
WC	(Switzerland) M Brunold	6	3	6
4	(United Kingdom) L Broady	6	7
(Austria) M Neuchrist	4	5
Q	K Kivattsev	2	3
8	(Canada) G Diallo	6	6

Quarterfinals
Q	(Romania) M Copil	6	6
WC	(Switzerland) M Brunold	3	3
4	(United Kingdom) L Broady	3	7	6
8	(Canada) G Diallo	6	5	3

Semifinals
Q	(Romania) M Copil	3	4
4	(United Kingdom) L Broady	6	6

=== Bottom half ===
First round
7	(Switzerland) A Ritschard	6^{3}	6	6^{6}
(Lebanon) B Hassan	7^{7}	4	7^{8}
(Tunisia) A Dougaz	3	6	6^{8}
PR	(United States) T-S Kwiatkowski	6	3	7^{10}
(Turkey) A Çelikbilek	2	0
(Kazakhstan) M Kukushkin	6	6
Q	(Italy) E Dalla Valle	6	3	6^{1}
3	(Slovakia) N Gombos	4	6	7^{7}
5	(Finland) O Virtanen	6	6
(Australia) J McCabe	4	4
Q	(Israel) D Cukierman	6	7^{7}
A Vatutin	4	6^{3}
WC	(Switzerland) J Paul	6^{5}	4
Q	(Italy) F Forti	7^{7}	6
Q	(Austria) N Oberleitner	3	6^{3}
2	(Austria) J Rodionov	6	7^{7}

Second round
(Lebanon) B Hassan	6	7^{7}
PR	(United States) T-S Kwiatkowski	4	6^{5}
(Kazakhstan) M Kukushkin	6^{2}	6	2
3	(Slovakia) N Gombos	7^{7}	4	6
5	(Finland) O Virtanen	6	6
Q	(Israel) D Cukierman	2	3
Q	(Italy) F Forti	4	4
2	(Austria) J Rodionov	6	6

Quarterfinals
(Lebanon) B Hassan	7^{7}	6
3	(Slovakia) N Gombos	6^{2}	2
5	(Finland) O Virtanen	6^{4}	7	3
2	(Austria) J Rodionov	7^{7}	5	6

Semifinals
(Lebanon) B Hassan	3	5
2	(Austria) J Rodionov	6	7
