= 2022 Traralgon International – Women's singles =

Women's singles
- 2022 Traralgon International

Final
- Champion: (China) Yuan Yue
- Runner-up: (Argentina) Paula Ormaechea
- Score: 6–3, 6–2

Events
Singles	men	women
Doubles	men	women
- Traralgon International

Ashleigh Barty was the defending champion, having won the previous edition in 2012, but chose to participate at the 2022 Adelaide International instead.

Yue Yuan won the title, defeating Paula Ormaechea in the final, 6–3, 6–2.

== Seeds ==
1. (China) Wang Xiyu (second round)
2. (United States) Katie Volynets (quarterfinals)
3. (United States) Usue Maitane Arconada (second round)
4. (Greece) Valentini Grammatikopoulou (second round)
5. (Austria) Julia Grabher (second round)
6. (Japan) Kurumi Nara (second round)
7. (Brazil) Laura Pigossi (first round)
8. (France) Jessika Ponchet (second round)

== Draw ==
Key

- Q = Qualifier
- WC = Wild card
- LL = Lucky loser
- Alt = Alternate
- ITF = ITF entry
- PR = Protected ranking
- SR = Special ranking
- SE = Special exempt
- JE = Junior exempt
- JR = Junior Accelerator Programme entrant
- CO = College Accelerator Programme entrant
- NG = Next Gen Accelerator Program entrant
- w/o = Walkover
- r = Retired
- d = Defaulted

=== Finals ===
Semifinals
(United States) Sachia Vickery	5	2^{r}
(China) Yuan Yue	7	4
Q	(United States) Emina Bektas	4	4
(Argentina) Paula Ormaechea	6	6

Final
(China) Yuan Yue	6	6
(Argentina) Paula Ormaechea	3	2

=== Top half ===
First round
1	(China) Xiy Wang	6	6
LL	(Czech Republic) M Kolodziejová	1	1
WC	(Australia) R Gilheany	1	1
Q	(Croatia) T Mrdeža	6	6
(United States) S Vickery	6	6
Q	(Netherlands) R Hogenkamp	1	1
(Romania) G Lee	2	0
5	(Austria) J Grabher	6	6
3	(United States) UM Arconada	6	6
WC	(Australia) L Mays	0	0
LL	(Spain) A Lázaro García	1	3
(China) Y Yuan	6	6
LL	(Belgium) M Benoît	3	7^{7}	5
Q	(Russia) A Zakharova	6	6^{1}	7
Q	(Russia) M Melnikova	6	6
7	(Brazil) L Pigossi	2	0

Second round
1	(China) Xiy Wang	6	5	1
Q	(Croatia) T Mrdeža	2	7	6
(United States) S Vickery	6	3	6
5	(Austria) J Grabher	3	6	3
3	(United States) UM Arconada	2	0
(China) Y Yuan	6	6
Q	(Russia) A Zakharova	6	4	6
Q	(Russia) M Melnikova	1	6	1

Quarterfinals
Q	(Croatia) T Mrdeža	4	2
(United States) S Vickery	6	6
(China) Y Yuan	6	6
Q	(Russia) A Zakharova	3	2

Semifinals
(United States) S Vickery	5	2^{r}
(China) Y Yuan	7	4

=== Bottom half ===
First round
8	(France) J Ponchet	7^{9}	2
Q	(United Kingdom) T Moore	6^{7}	1^{r}
Q	(United States) E Bektas	6	7^{7}
Q	(Czech Republic) J Malečková	3	6^{4}
WC	(Australia) I Bozicevic	1	0
(United Kingdom) J Burrage	6	6
(Romania) A Cadanțu-Ignatik	2	2
4	(Greece) V Grammatikopoulou	6	6
6	(Japan) K Nara	2	6	6
(Switzerland) S Waltert	6	3	0
(Argentina) P Ormaechea	6	6
WC	(Australia) A Poulos	4	1
PR	(United Kingdom) S Murray Sharan	7^{7}	2	0
Q	(United States) C Harrison	6^{2}	6	6
(South Korea) S-j Jang	3	2
2	(United States) K Volynets	6	6

Second round
8	(France) J Ponchet	6^{5}	2
Q	(United States) E Bektas	7^{7}	6
(United Kingdom) J Burrage	7^{7}	7^{7}
4	(Greece) V Grammatikopoulou	6^{5}	6^{4}
6	(Japan) K Nara	4	2
(Argentina) P Ormaechea	6	6
Q	(United States) C Harrison	3	0
2	(United States) K Volynets	6	6

Quarterfinals
Q	(United States) E Bektas	2	7^{10}	7
(United Kingdom) J Burrage	6	6^{8}	5
(Argentina) P Ormaechea	6	6
2	(United States) K Volynets	4	4

Semifinals
Q	(United States) E Bektas	4	4
(Argentina) P Ormaechea	6	6
