= 2022 Traralgon International – Men's doubles =

Men's doubles
- 2022 Traralgon International

Final
- Champions: (France) Manuel Guinard (Czech Republic) Zdeněk Kolář
- Runners-up: (Switzerland) Marc-Andrea Hüsler (Switzerland) Dominic Stricker
- Score: 6–3, 6–4

Events
Singles	men	women
Doubles	men	women
← 2019 ·	Traralgon International	· 2023 →

Max Purcell and Luke Saville were the defending champions but chose not to compete.

Manuel Guinard and Zdeněk Kolář won the title after defeating Marc-Andrea Hüsler and Dominic Stricker 6–3, 6–4 in the final.

== Seeds ==
1. (Netherlands) Jesper de Jong / (Netherlands) Robin Haase (first round)
2. (Indonesia) Christopher Rungkat / (India) Divij Sharan (semifinals)
3. (France) Manuel Guinard / (Czech Republic) Zdeněk Kolář (champions)
4. (Switzerland) Marc-Andrea Hüsler / (Switzerland) Dominic Stricker (final)

== Draw ==
=== Key ===
- Q = Qualifier
- WC = Wild card
- LL = Lucky loser
- Alt = Alternate
- SE = Special exempt
- PR = Protected ranking
- ITF = ITF entry
- JE = Junior exempt
- w/o = Walkover
- r = Retired
- d = Defaulted
- SR = Special ranking

First round
1	(Netherlands) J de Jong (Netherlands) R Haase	5	3
(Czech Republic) J Lehečka (Czech Republic) T Macháč	7	6
WC	(Australia) C Puttergill (Australia) D Sweeny	w/o
(France) G Blancaneaux (Belgium) K Coppejans
(United States) B Fratangelo (United States) M Krueger	6	6^{3}	[8]
(Australia) H Bourchier (Australia) B Walkin	2	7^{7}	[10]
(Croatia) N Serdarušić (Netherlands) T van Rijthoven	7^{10}	6
WC	(Australia) J Charlton (Australia) Patrick Fitzgerald	6^{8}	4
(Australia) A Santillan (New Zealand) R Statham	6^{3}	6^{3}
4	(Switzerland) M-A Hüsler (Switzerland) D Stricker	7^{7}	7^{7}
(Czech Republic) L Rosol (Ukraine) V Sachko	w/o
(Australia) B Ellis (Australia) T Schoolkate

Quarterfinals
(Czech Republic) J Lehečka (Czech Republic) T Macháč
WC	(Australia) C Puttergill (Australia) D Sweeny	w/o
3	(France) M Guinard (Czech Republic) Z Kolář	4	6	[10]
(Australia) H Bourchier (Australia) B Walkin	6	3	[8]
(Croatia) N Serdarušić (Netherlands) T van Rijthoven
4	(Switzerland) M-A Hüsler (Switzerland) D Stricker	w/o
(Czech Republic) L Rosol (Ukraine) V Sachko	4	6	[8]
2	(Indonesia) C Rungkat (India) D Sharan	6	3	[10]

Semifinals
WC	(Australia) C Puttergill (Australia) D Sweeny	4	6	[7]
3	(France) M Guinard (Czech Republic) Z Kolář	6	2	[10]
4	(Switzerland) M-A Hüsler (Switzerland) D Stricker	6	6
2	(Indonesia) C Rungkat (India) D Sharan	4	4

Final
3	(France) M Guinard (Czech Republic) Z Kolář	6	6
4	(Switzerland) M-A Hüsler (Switzerland) D Stricker	3	4
