= 2023 Challenger Biel/Bienne – Doubles =

Doubles
- 2023 Challenger Biel/Bienne

Final
- Champions: (Germany) Constantin Frantzen (Germany) Hendrik Jebens
- Runners-up: (Romania) Victor Vlad Cornea (Croatia) Franko Škugor
- Score: 6–2, 6–4

Events
Singles	Doubles
- Challenger Biel/Bienne

Pierre-Hugues Herbert and Albano Olivetti were the defending champions but chose not to defend their title.

Constantin Frantzen and Hendrik Jebens won the title after defeating Victor Vlad Cornea and Franko Škugor 6–2, 6–4 in the final.

== Seeds ==
1. (Jamaica) Dustin Brown / (Pakistan) Aisam-ul-Haq Qureshi (quarterfinals)
2. (Monaco) Romain Arneodo / (Austria) Sam Weissborn (quarterfinals)
3. (Australia) Andrew Harris / (Australia) John-Patrick Smith (quarterfinals)
4. (India) Sriram Balaji / (India) Ramkumar Ramanathan (semifinals)

== Draw ==
Key

- Q = Qualifier
- WC = Wild card
- LL = Lucky loser
- Alt = Alternate
- ITF = ITF entry
- PR = Protected ranking
- SR = Special ranking
- SE = Special exempt
- JE = Junior exempt
- JR = Junior Accelerator Programme entrant
- CO = College Accelerator Programme entrant
- NG = Next Gen Accelerator Program entrant
- w/o = Walkover
- r = Retired
- d = Defaulted

First round
1	(Jamaica) D Brown (Pakistan) A-u-H Qureshi	7^{7}	7
(Austria) N Oberleitner (Austria) P Oswald	6^{5}	5
(Romania) VV Cornea (Croatia) F Škugor	4	7^{7}	[10]
(Poland) K Drzewiecki (Poland) S Walków	6	6^{2}	[8]
4	(India) S Balaji (India) R Ramanathan	6	6
WC	(Switzerland) M Brunold (Switzerland) D Dietrich	1	2
(Norway) V Durasovic (Finland) O Virtanen	2	3
(Czech Republic) M Gengel (Czech Republic) P Nouza	6	6
(Germany) C Frantzen (Germany) H Jebens	3	7	[10]
(United Kingdom) L Broady (United Kingdom) J O'Mara	6	5	[5]
(Israel) D Cukierman (New Zealand) A Sitak	5	7^{7}	[6]
3	(Australia) A Harris (Australia) J-P Smith	7	6^{5}	[10]
WC	(Peru) A Merino (Switzerland) J Paul	2	2
(Czech Republic) Z Kolář (Slovakia) I Zelenay	6	6
(India) A Kadhe (Germany) D Masur	6^{5}	6^{5}
2	(Monaco) R Arneodo (Austria) S Weissborn	7^{7}	7^{7}

Quarterfinals
1	(Jamaica) D Brown (Pakistan) A-u-H Qureshi	6	2	[4]
(Romania) VV Cornea (Croatia) F Škugor	1	6	[10]
4	(India) S Balaji (India) R Ramanathan	7^{8}	6
(Czech Republic) M Gengel (Czech Republic) P Nouza	6^{6}	2
(Germany) C Frantzen (Germany) H Jebens	6	6
3	(Australia) A Harris (Australia) J-P Smith	3	4
(Czech Republic) Z Kolář (Slovakia) I Zelenay	6	6
2	(Monaco) R Arneodo (Austria) S Weissborn	3	3

Semifinals
(Romania) VV Cornea (Croatia) F Škugor	7	6
4	(India) S Balaji (India) R Ramanathan	5	3
(Germany) C Frantzen (Germany) H Jebens	6^{7}	6	[10]
(Czech Republic) Z Kolář (Slovakia) I Zelenay	7^{9}	4	[5]

Final
(Romania) VV Cornea (Croatia) F Škugor	2	4
(Germany) C Frantzen (Germany) H Jebens	6	6
