= Miyazaki Challenger =

- 2026 Miyazaki Challenger

ATP Challenger Tour
- Event name: Koyushokucho Miyazaki Challenger
- Location: Miyazaki, Japan
- Category: ATP Challenger Tour
- Surface: Hard
- Website: Website

The Koyushokucho Miyazaki Challenger is a professional tennis tournament played on hardcourts. It is currently part of the ATP Challenger Tour. It was first held in Miyazaki, Japan in 2026.

== Past finals ==
=== Singles ===
Year	Champion	Runner-up	Score
2026	(United Kingdom) Liam Broady	(United Kingdom) Harry Wendelken	3–6, 6–2, 6–2

=== Doubles ===
Year	Champions	Runners-up	Score
2026	(South Korea) Nam Ji-sung (Finland) Patrik Niklas-Salminen	(Japan) Yuta Shimizu (Japan) James Trotter	7–5, 6–3
