= Challenger Biel/Bienne =

Tennis tournament in Switzerland

Defunct tennis tournament
- Event name: FlowBank Biel/Bienne Challenger
- Founded: 2021
- Editions: 3 (2023)
- Location: Biel/Bienne, Switzerland
- Venue: Nationale Leistungszentrum von Swiss Tennis, Jan Group Arena
- Category: ATP Challenger Tour 100
- Surface: Hard (indoor)
- Draw: 32S/24Q/16D
- Prize money: €118,000 (2023), €45,730 (2022)
- Website: Website

Current champions (2023)
- Singles: (Austria) Jurij Rodionov
- Doubles: (Germany) Constantin Frantzen (Germany) Hendrik Jebens

The FlowBank Biel/Bienne Challenger was a professional tennis tournament played on indoor hardcourts on the ATP Challenger Tour and was held annually in Biel/Bienne in 2021, 2022 and 2023.

== Past finals ==
=== Singles ===
Year	Champion	Runner-up	Score
2023	(Austria) Jurij Rodionov	(United Kingdom) Liam Broady	6–3, 0–0 ret.
2022	(Austria) Jurij Rodionov	(Poland) Kacper Żuk	7–6^{(7–3)}, 6–4
2021	(United Kingdom) Liam Broady	(Switzerland) Marc-Andrea Hüsler	7–5, 6–3

=== Doubles ===
Year	Champions	Runners-up	Score
2023	(Germany) Constantin Frantzen (Germany) Hendrik Jebens	(Romania) Victor Vlad Cornea (Croatia) Franko Škugor	6–2, 6–4
2022	(France) Pierre-Hugues Herbert (France) Albano Olivetti	(India) Purav Raja (India) Ramkumar Ramanathan	6–3, 6–4
2021	(Belgium) Ruben Bemelmans (Germany) Daniel Masur	(Switzerland) Marc-Andrea Hüsler (Switzerland) Dominic Stricker	Walkover
