= Marc-Andrea Hüsler =

Swiss tennis player (born 1996)

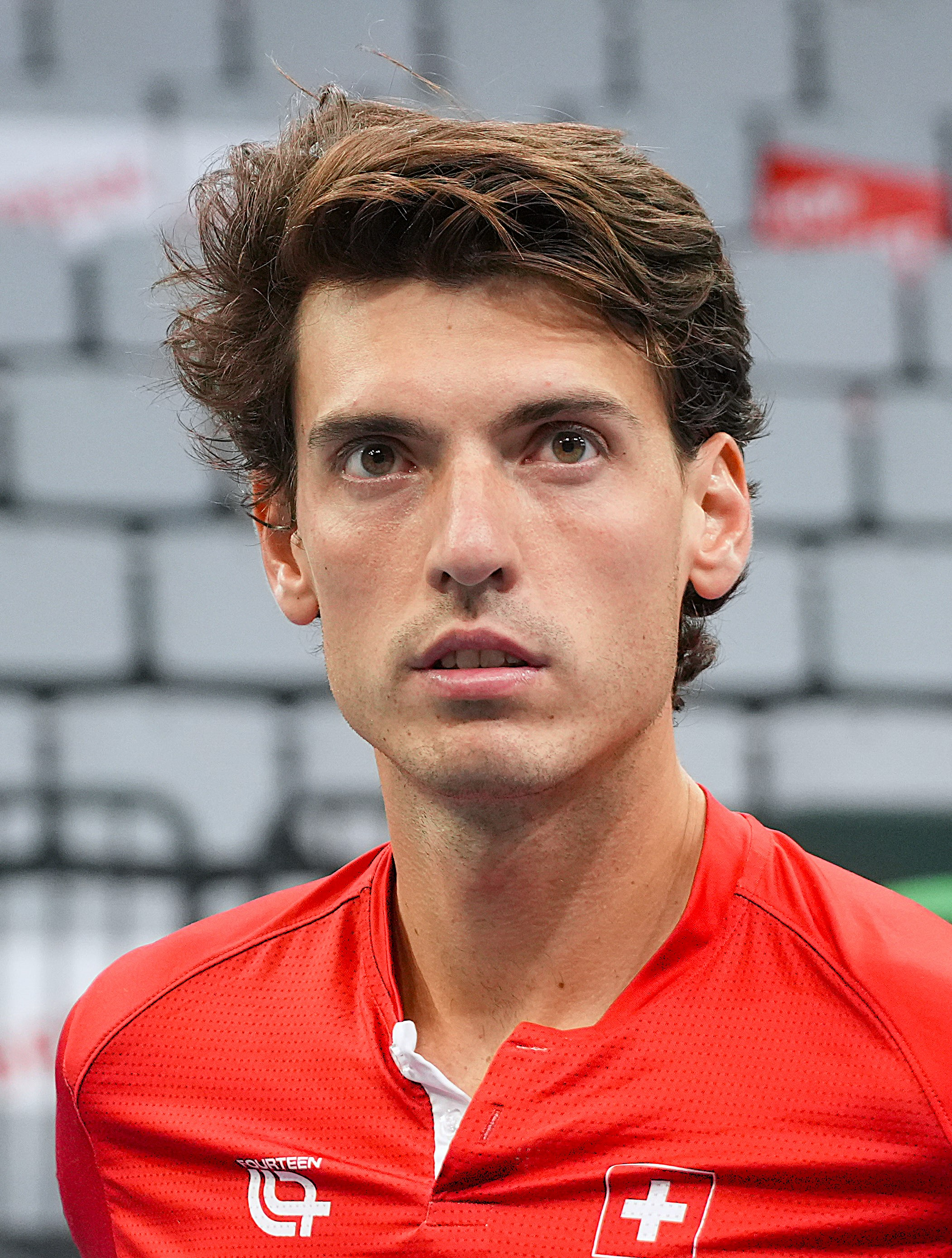
- Hüsler at the Davis Cup 2024
- ITF name: Marc-Andrea Huesler
- Country (sports): Switzerland
- Residence: Rüschlikon, Switzerland
- Born: 24 June 1996 (age 30) Zürich, Switzerland
- Height: 1.96 m (6 ft 5 in)
- Turned pro: 2016
- Retired: July 2026
- Plays: Left-handed (two-handed backhand)
- Coach: Juerg Huesler
- Prize money: US $2,172,871

Singles
- Career record: 32–54
- Career titles: 1
- Highest ranking: No. 47 (13 February 2023)

Grand Slam singles results
- Australian Open: 1R (2023)
- French Open: 1R (2023)
- Wimbledon: 1R (2022, 2023)
- US Open: 1R (2022, 2023)

Doubles
- Career record: 22–24
- Career titles: 1
- Highest ranking: No. 132 (25 October 2021)

Grand Slam doubles results
- Australian Open: 2R (2023)
- French Open: 2R (2023)
- Wimbledon: 1R (2023)
- US Open: 2R (2023)
- Last updated on: 1 September 2026.

Marc-Andrea Hüsler (born 24 June 1996) is a Swiss former professional tennis player. He has a career-high singles ranking by the ATP of world No. 47, achieved on 13 February 2023 and a doubles ranking of No. 132 achieved on 25 October 2021.

== Career ==
=== 2017: ATP debut and first win in doubles ===
Hüsler made his ATP main-draw doubles debut at the Swiss Indoors tournament, where he partnered former world No 1. Nenad Zimonjić, having received a wildcard into the tournament. The pair defeated Adrian Mannarino and Benoît Paire to give Hüsler a win in his first tour-level match, before losing in the quarterfinals to Marcus Daniell and Dominic Inglot.

=== 2018: Challenger doubles title, ATP singles debut & first win ===
Hüsler claimed his first ATP Challenger Tour doubles title in his first final, partnering Sem Verbeek at the Winnipeg Challenger.

Just over a week later, Hüsler made his ATP Tour singles main-draw debut at the Swiss Open Gstaad, where he recorded his first ATP win defeating former top-10 player Nicolás Almagro in a third-set tiebreaker in the first round, before losing to Facundo Bagnis in the second round. Hüsler received a wildcard into the doubles draw for the Swiss Indoors for the second consecutive year, this time with Verbeek as his partner. The pair upset Michael Venus and Raven Klaasen, the top seeds for the tournament and world No. 7 doubles partnership in the 2018 Doubles Team Race Rankings in the first round.

=== 2019: First Challenger singles title & top 300 ===
On April 21, 2019, Hüsler won his first Challenger title at the 2019 San Luis Open Challenger Tour by beating Adrian Menendez-Maceiras 7–5, 7–6 in the final. As a result, he moved 70 positions up into the top 300 on 22 April at world No. 281 in singles.

=== 2020: Challenger titles, ATP semifinals & top 150 ===
Hüsler reached the semifinals of the Austrian Open Kitzbühel, where he beat world No. 12 Fabio Fognini in the second round. As a result, he reached the top 150 at world No. 149 on 9 November 2020.

=== 2021: Maiden ATP title in doubles ===
He won his maiden ATP doubles title at the 2021 Swiss Open Gstaad, partnering Dominic Stricker, defeating Polish pair Szymon Walków and Jan Zieliński.

In September, partnering also with Stricker, he reached the final of the 2021 Challenger Biel/Bienne, Switzerland but withdrew. As a result, he reached a month later a new career-high doubles ranking of World No. 132 on 25 October 2021. He also reached the final in singles, where he lost to Liam Broady but climbed to No. 155 on 18 October 2021.

He finished the year ranked No. 188 in singles.

=== 2022: Major & Masters debuts, Swiss No. 1, First ATP singles title ===
Hüsler started his 2022 season at the Traralgon International. Seeded ninth, he lost in the third round to eighth seed Mikhail Kukushkin.

In April, he won two more Challenger titles in Mexico. As a result, he reached a career-high ranking of No. 121 on 9 May 2022.

In June, at the 2022 Halle Open he qualified for his first ATP 500 tournament but lost to Mackenzie McDonald. Hüsler made his Grand Slam debut after qualifying for Wimbledon, where he lost to lucky loser Hugo Grenier, who was also making his debut, in the first round in five sets.

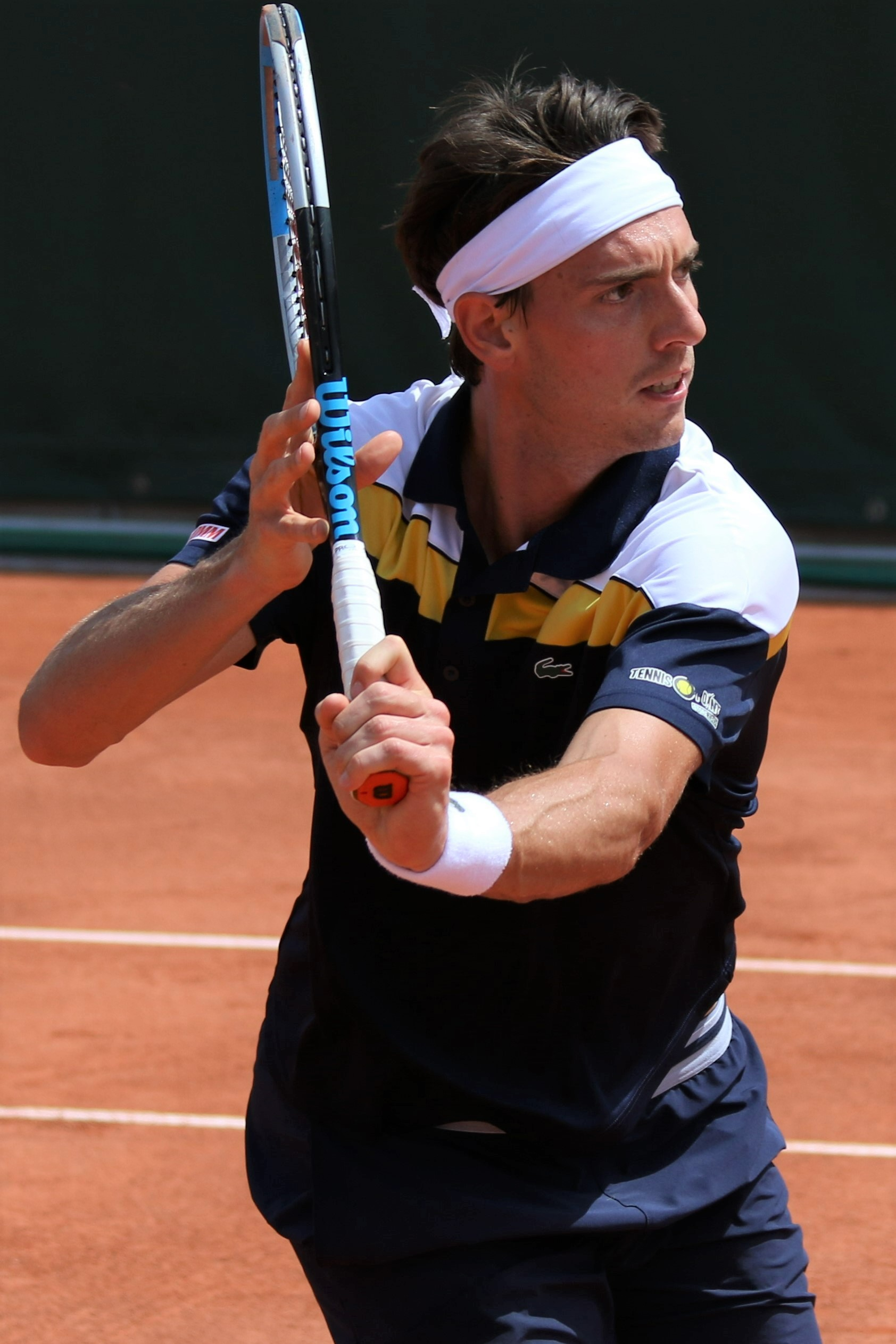
Hüsler at the 2022 French Open

At the Swedish Open, he defeated seventh seed Holger Rune in the first round before losing to Laslo Djere. As a result, he reached the top 100 at world No. 99 on 18 July 2022. He became the Swiss No. 1 player until 8 August 2022.

At the Winston-Salem Open, he reached only his second career quarterfinal as a qualifier after getting a second-round bye after seventh seed Sebastián Báez withdrew, defeating previous year finalist and wildcard Mikael Ymer and defending champion and eleventh seed Ilya Ivashka. Next, he reached the semifinals for the second time ever in his career defeating thirteenth seed Jack Draper in straight sets. He was only the fourth qualifier to reach the tournament semifinals ever. He lost again to Laslo Đere in the semifinal. As a result, he reached a new career-high ranking of No. 85 becoming again the Swiss No. 1 player on 29 August 2022.

At the 2022 Sofia Open, he reached his first ATP final with a win over fourth seed Lorenzo Musetti. He defeated again fifth seed Holger Rune to win his maiden ATP title. As a result, he climbed 31 spots to a new career-high of No. 64 in the rankings on 3 October 2022.

He made his Masters 1000 debut at the 2022 Rolex Paris Masters after defeating Hugo Gaston and Laslo Djere in qualifying. On his debut, he defeated 11th seed Jannik Sinner in his first-round match. He lost to Karen Khachanov in the second round. As a result, he reached a career-high ranking of world No. 58 on 7 November 2022.

=== 2023: United Cup & Top 50 debuts ===
Hüsler started his 2023 season by representing Switzerland at the first edition of the United Cup. Switzerland was in Group B alongside Kazakhstan and Poland. Against Kazakhstan, he beat Timofey Skatov. With Jil Teichmann, they defeated Zhibek Kulambayeva and Alexander Bublik to sweep Kazakhstan 5–0. Against Poland, he beat Daniel Michalski. In doubles, he and Belinda Bencic defeated Alicja Rosolska and Kacper Żuk. Poland ended up winning the tie over Switzerland 3–2. Switzerland was ultimately eliminated from the United Cup and ended second in Group B. At the Adelaide International 2, he beat the previous year finalist, Arthur Rinderknech, in the first round. He was defeated in the second round by third seed and world No. 20, Karen Khachanov. At the Australian Open, he lost in a five-set battle in the first round to Australian wildcard John Millman. He reached the top 50 at world No. 49 following the Australian Open on 6 February 2023.

Representing Switzerland in the Davis Cup tie against Germany, he won his first match over Oscar Otte. In his second match, he beat world No. 14 Alexander Zverev. Switzerland ended up winning the tie over Germany 3–2 to advance to the Davis Cup Finals. At the Open Sud de France, he was beaten in the second round by top seed and world No. 9, Holger Rune. In Rotterdam, he lost in the first round to Dutch wildcard Gijs Brouwer. Seeded eighth at the Open 13 Provence, he was defeated in the first round by Grégoire Barrère. In Dubai, he lost in the first round to Lorenzo Sonego.

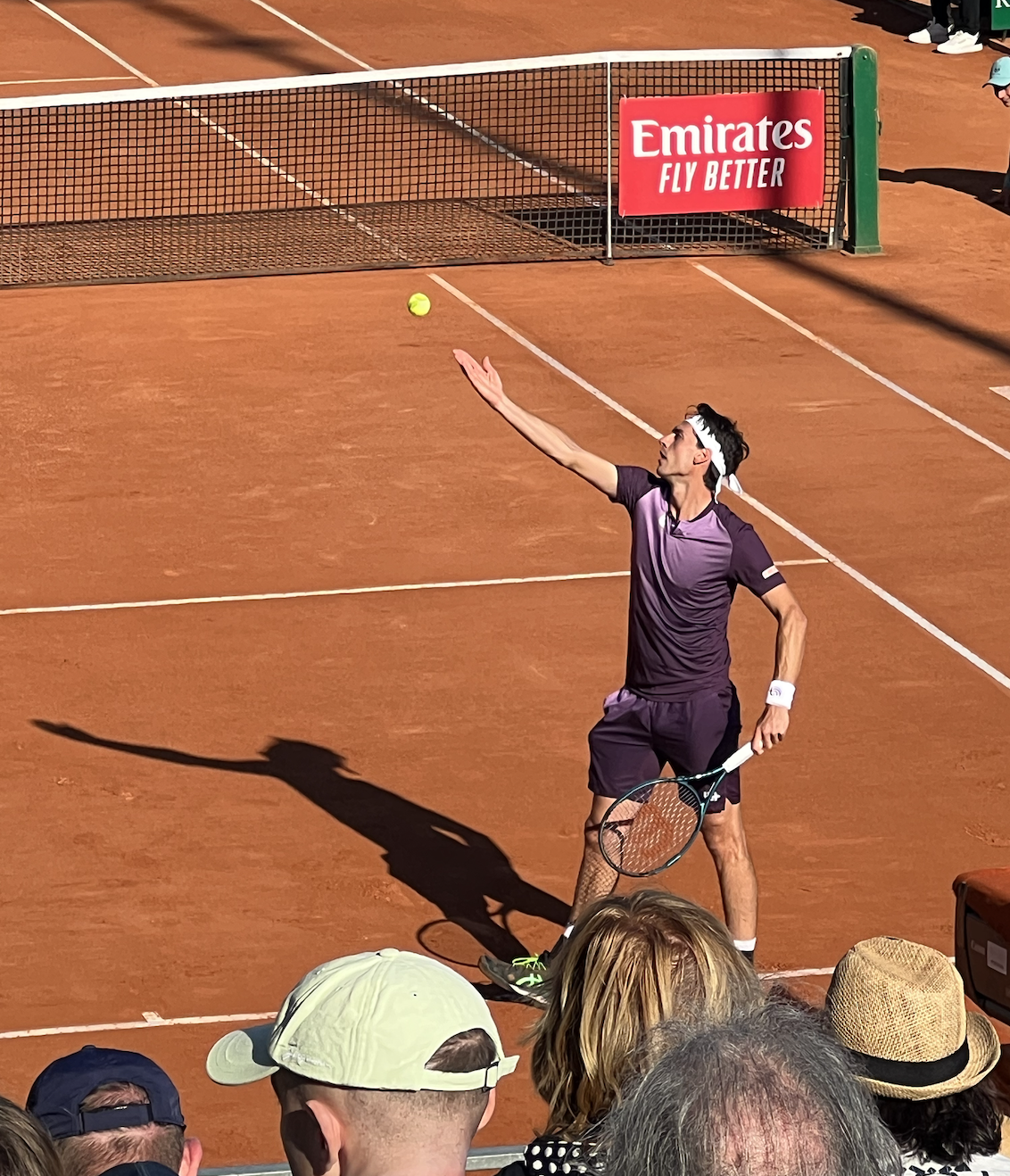
Hüsler serving in Monte-Carlo in 2023.

In March 2023, Hüsler made his debut at the BNP Paribas Open. He was eliminated from the tournament in the first round by Pedro Martínez. Seeded sixth at the Arizona Classic, he lost in the second round to qualifier and eventual finalist, Alexander Shevchenko. In Miami, also on his debut, he won his first round match over Albert Ramos Viñolas before losing in the second round to 16th seed and world No. 19, Tommy Paul.

Hüsler started his clay court season at the 2023 Mexico City Open. As the top seed and the defending champion, he lost in the second round to qualifier Federico Gaio. At the Monte-Carlo Masters, he was defeated in the first round by Jaume Munar. Seeded eighth at the BMW Open in Munich, he lost in the second round to Dominic Thiem. In Madrid, he fell in his first-round match to Cristian Garín. At the Italian Open, he lost in the first round to Jason Kubler in three sets, despite having a 7–6(6), 3–0 lead in the match. Hüsler played his final tournament before Roland Garros at the 2023 Geneva Open. He was defeated in the first round by Wu Yibing in three sets, despite having match point in the third-set tiebreaker. At the 2023 French Open, he lost in the first round to Daniel Altmaier in straight sets.

Hüsler started his grass court season at the 2023 Libéma Open in 's-Hertogenbosch. He marked his debut at this tournament by upsetting eighth seed Maxime Cressy in the first round. This was his first tour-level win on grass. He lost in five sets at the 2023 Wimbledon Championships to world No. 116, lucky loser and Wimbledon debutant Yosuke Watanuki, after being two sets to love up, in a close to a four hours match that was suspended due to darkness.

He suffered another tough first round five sets loss also from two sets to love up at the 2023 US Open, to world No. 16 Hubert Hurkacz and subsequently dropped out of the top 150 in October 2023, after a string of first round losses, more than a 100 positions down from his career high in February 2023. Ranked No. 200, at the 2023 Sofia Open, where he was the defending champion, he qualified for the main draw.

=== 2024-2026: Retirement ===
He further dropped to world No. 237 in the rankings on 1 April 2024, close to 200 positions from his singles career-high a year earlier. In mid-April 2024, he qualified for the main draw of the 2024 BMW Open in Munich and defeated two Germans, wildcard Marko Topo and Yannick Hanfmann to reach his first quarterfinal in more than a year. He lost to defending champion Holger Rune in straight sets. Hüsler qualified at the 2024 Libéma Open in 's-Hertogenbosch but lost to Roberto Bautista Agut. He returned to the top 200 on 5 August 2024, and to the top 165 two weeks later, raising 40 positions up from No. 205, following lifting his sixth Challenger title at the 2024 Kozerki Open in Grodzisk Mazowiecki, Poland.

He won his seventh ATP Tour Challenger title at the 2025 Morelos Open. It was his fourth Challenger title in Mexico. He returned to the top 150 at No. 142 on 7 April 2025 but dropped again out of the top 250 on 29 September 2025.

In July 2026, he announced his retirement from professional tennis, with the 2026 Zug Open as the last tournament of his career, where he lost in the final.

== Davis Cup ==
Hüsler made his Davis Cup debut for Switzerland in the 2018 Davis Cup World Group tie with Kazakhstan, where he partnered Luca Margaroli in the doubles. The pair were defeated, coming back from two sets to love down, but losing the fifth set to Timur Khabibulin and Aleksandr Nedovyesov. Hüsler made his singles debut in the following rubber, which by this point was dead as Switzerland were already 3–0 down. Hüsler won in straight sets over Roman Khassanov, salvaging the only point for Switzerland in the tie. He opened up Switzerland's World Group play-off tie against Sweden, losing from two sets to love up against Markus Eriksson, as Switzerland were relegated from the World Group.

== Singles performance timeline ==
Key
W	F	SF	QF	#R	RR	Q#	DNQ	A	NH

(W) winner; (F) finalist; (SF) semifinalist; (QF) quarterfinalist; (#R) rounds 4, 3, 2, 1; (RR) round-robin stage; (Q#) qualification round; (DNQ) did not qualify; (A) absent; (NH) not held; (SR) strike rate (events won / competed); (W–L) win–loss record.
To avoid confusion and double counting, these charts are updated at the conclusion of a tournament or when the player's participation has ended.

Current through the 2026 Australian Open.

Tournament	2018	2019	2020	2021	2022	2023	2024	2025	SR	W–L
Grand Slam tournaments
Australian Open	A	A	A	Q2	Q1	1R	Q2	Q1	0 / 1	0–1
French Open	A	A	A	Q2	Q1	1R	Q1	Q1	0 / 1	0–1
Wimbledon	A	A	NH	Q2	1R	1R	Q1	Q1	0 / 2	0–2
US Open	A	A	A	Q1	1R	1R	Q1	Q3	0 / 2	0–2
Masters 1000 tournaments
Indian Wells	A	A	NH	A	A	1R	A	A	0 / 1	0–1
Miami Open	A	A	NH	Q2	A	2R	A	A	0 / 1	1–1
Monte Carlo Masters	A	A	NH	Q1	A	1R	A	A	0 / 1	0–1
Madrid Open	A	A	NH	A	A	1R	A	A	0 / 1	0–1
Italian Open	A	A	A	A	A	1R	A	Q1	0 / 1	0–1
Canadian Open	A	A	NH	A	Q2	A	A	A	0 / 0	0–0
Cincinnati Open	A	A	A	A	A	Q2	A	A	0 / 0	0–0
Shanghai Masters	A	A	NH			A	A	Q1	0 / 0	0–0
Paris Masters	A	A	A	A	2R	A	A	A	0 / 1	1–1
National representation
Davis Cup	1R	QR	A	A	WG1	QR	QR	WG1	0 / 6	5–7
United Cup										
Career statistics
Tournaments	1	1	2	2	12	24	5	1	48	
Overall win–loss	2–2	0–2	4–2	0–2	11–12	11–24	4–7	0–2	32–53	
Year-end ranking	371	277	148	188	58	197	159	244	38%	

== ATP career finals ==
=== Singles: 1 (1 title) ===
Legend Grand Slam tournaments (0–0) ATP Tour Finals (0–0) ATP Tour Masters 1000 (0–0) ATP Tour 500 Series (0–0) ATP Tour 250 Series (1–0)	Titles by surface Hard (1–0) Clay (0–0) Grass (0–0)	Titles by setting Outdoor (0–0) Indoor (1–0)

Result	W–L	Date	Tournament	Tier	Surface	Opponent	Score
Win	1–0	Oct 2022	Sofia Open, Bulgaria	250 Series	Hard (i)	(Denmark) Holger Rune	6–4, 7–6^{(10–8)}

=== Doubles: 1 (1 title) ===
Legend Grand Slam tournaments (0–0) ATP Tour Finals (0–0) ATP Tour Masters 1000 (0–0) ATP Tour 500 Series (0–0) ATP Tour 250 Series (1–0)	Titles by surface Hard (0–0) Clay (1–0) Grass (0–0)	Titles by setting Outdoor (1–0) Indoor (0–0)

Result	W–L	Date	Tournament	Tier	Surface	Partner	Opponents	Score
Win	1–0	Jul 2021	Swiss Open Gstaad, Switzerland	250 Series	Clay	(Switzerland) Dominic Stricker	(Poland) Szymon Walków (Poland) Jan Zieliński	6–1, 7–6^{(9–7)}

== ATP Challenger and ITF Futures finals ==
=== Singles: 12 (9–3) ===
Legend ATP Challenger (7–2) ITF Futures (2–1)	Finals by surface Hard (4–1) Clay (4–2) Grass (0–0) Carpet (1–0)

Result	W–L	Date	Tournament	Tier	Surface	Opponent	Score
Loss	0–1	Sep 2017	Switzerland F5, Sion	Futures	Clay	(Japan) Hiroyasu Ehara	6–4, 4–6, 2–6
Win	1–1	Dec 2017	Mexico F7, Metepec	Futures	Hard	(Ecuador) Gonzalo Escobar	6–3, 6–4
Win	2–1	Jun 2018	USA F17, Tulsa	Futures	Hard	(United States) Sam Riffice	6–4, 6–2
Win	3–1	Apr 2019	San Luis Potosí, Mexico	Challenger	Clay	(Spain) Adrián Menéndez Maceiras	7–5, 7–6^{(7–3)}
Win	4–1	Sep 2020	Sibiu, Romania	Challenger	Clay	(Argentina) Tomás Martín Etcheverry	7–5, 6–0
Win	5–1	Oct 2020	Ismaning, Germany	Challenger	Carpet	(Netherlands) Botic van de Zandschulp	6–7^{(3–7)}, 7–6^{(7–2)}, 7–5
Loss	5–2	Sep 2021	Biel/Bienne, Switzerland	Challenger	Hard (i)	(United Kingdom) Liam Broady	5–7, 3–6
Win	6–2	Apr 2022	Mexico City, Mexico	Challenger	Clay	(Argentina) Tomás Martín Etcheverry	6–4, 6–2
Win	7–2	Apr 2022	Aguascalientes, Mexico	Challenger	Clay	(Argentina) Juan Pablo Ficovich	6–4, 4–6, 6–3
Win	8–2	Aug 2024	Grodzisk Mazowiecki, Poland	Challenger	Hard	(Czech Republic) Vít Kopřiva	6–1, 6–4
Win	9–2	Mar 2025	Morelos Open, Mexico	Challenger	Hard	(Kazakhstan) Dmitry Popko	6–4, 3–6, 6–4
Loss	9–3	Jul 2026	Zug Open, Switzerland	Challenger	Clay	(Brazil) Thiago Seyboth Wild	4–6, 3–6

=== Doubles: 22 (11–11) ===
Legend ATP Challenger (4–6) ITF Futures (7–5)	Finals by surface Hard (8–8) Clay (2–3) Grass (0–0) Carpet (1–0)

Result	W–L	Date	Tournament	Tier	Surface	Partner	Opponents	Score
Loss	0–1	Apr 2015	Italy F5, Santa Margherita di Pula	Futures	Clay	(Switzerland) Loïc Perret	(Italy) Davide Melchiorre (Italy) Riccardo Sinicropi	5–7, 0–6
Loss	0–2	Oct 2016	Germany F14, Oberhaching	Futures	Hard (i)	(Switzerland) Raphael Baltensperger	(Germany) Hannes Wagner (Germany) Louis Wessels	1–6, 4–6
Loss	0–3	Jun 2017	Italy F19, Basilicanova	Futures	Clay	(Austria) Lenny Hampel	(Brazil) Wilson Leite (Brazil) Bruno Sant'Anna	5–7, 4–6
Win	1–3	Jul 2017	Austria F1, Telfs	Futures	Clay	(Germany) Lukas Ollert	(Austria) Pascal Brunner (Australia) Gavin van Peperzeel	7–5, 7–5
Loss	1–4	Oct 2017	Germany F14, Oberhaching	Futures	Hard (i)	(United Kingdom) Neil Pauffley	(Germany) Johannes Härteis (Germany) Daniel Masur	6–4, 5–7, [5–10]
Loss	1–5	Nov 2017	Mexico F5, Campeche	Futures	Hard	(Switzerland) Jessy Kalambay	(Colombia) José Daniel Bendeck (Colombia) Alejandro Gómez	3–6, 6–3, [7–10]
Win	2–5	Nov 2017	Mexico F6, Monterrey	Futures	Hard	(Switzerland) Jessy Kalambay	(Ecuador) Gonzalo Escobar (Bolivia) Federico Zeballos	7–6^{(7–5)}, 6–4
Win	3–5	Feb 2018	Switzerland F1, Oberentfelden	Futures	Carpet (i)	(Switzerland) Jakub Paul	(Czech Republic) Jan Mertl (Czech Republic) Michael Vrbenský	4–6, 7–6^{(9–7)}, [10–8]
Win	4–5	Mar 2018	France F6, Villers-lès-Nancy	Futures	Hard (i)	(France) Hugo Voljacques	(France) Dan Added (France) Maxime Tchoutakian	7–6^{(7–4)}, 7–6^{(7–3)}
Win	5–5	Jun 2018	USA F13, Winston-Salem	Futures	Hard	(Netherlands) Sem Verbeek	(United States) Trevor Allen Johnson (United States) Ronnie Schneider	7–6^{(9–7)}, 6–1
Win	6–5	Jul 2018	Canada F5, Saskatoon	Futures	Hard	(Netherlands) Sem Verbeek	(Canada) Alexis Galarneau (Canada) Benjamin Sigouin	6–3, 6–3
Win	7–5	Jul 2018	Winnipeg, Canada	Challenger	Hard	(Netherlands) Sem Verbeek	(Spain) Marcel Granollers (Spain) Gerard Granollers Pujol	6–7^{(5–7)}, 6–3, [14–12]
Win	8–5	Aug 2018	Switzerland F3, Sion	Futures	Clay	(Switzerland) Jakub Paul	(Argentina) Juan Pablo Ficovich (Argentina) Tomás Lipovšek Puches	6–3, 6–4
Loss	8–6	Sep 2018	Cassis, France	Challenger	Hard	(Portugal) Gonçalo Oliveira	(Australia) Matt Reid (Ukraine) Sergiy Stakhovsky	2–6, 3–6
Loss	8–7	Nov 2018	Andria, Italy	Challenger	Hard (i)	(Netherlands) David Pel	(Poland) Karol Drzewiecki (Poland) Szymon Walków	6–7^{(10–12)}, 6–2, [9–11]
Win	9–7	Feb 2019	Morelos, Mexico	Challenger	Hard	(Sweden) André Göransson	(Ecuador) Gonzalo Escobar (Venezuela) Luis David Martínez	6–3, 3–6, [11–9]
Loss	9–8	Jun 2019	Shymkent, Kazakhstan	Challenger	Clay	(Sweden) André Göransson	(Serbia) Nikola Ćaćić (Chinese Taipei) Yang Tsung-hua	4–6, 4–6
Win	10–8	Oct 2020	Hamburg, Germany	Challenger	Hard (i)	(Poland) Kamil Majchrzak	(United Kingdom) Lloyd Glasspool (United States) Alex Lawson	6–3, 1–6, [20–18]
Loss	10–9	Jan 2021	Quimper, France	Challenger	Hard (i)	(United States) James Cerretani	(France) Grégoire Barrère (France) Albano Olivetti	7–5, 6–7^{(7–9)}, [8–10]
Win	11–9	Feb 2021	Potechefstroom, South Africa	Challenger	Hard	(Czech Republic) Zdeněk Kolář	(Canada) Peter Polansky (Canada) Brayden Schnur	6–4, 2–6, [10–4]
Loss	11–10	Sep 2021	Biel/Bienne, Switzerland	Challenger	Hard (i)	(Switzerland) Dominic Stricker	(Belgium) Ruben Bemelmans (Germany) Daniel Masur	w/o
Loss	11–11	Jan 2022	Traralgon, Australia	Challenger	Hard	(Switzerland) Dominic Stricker	(France) Manuel Guinard (Czech Republic) Zdeněk Kolář	3–6, 4–6

== Record against top 10 players ==
Hüsler's record against players who have been ranked in the top 10, with those who are active in boldface. Only ATP Tour main draw matches are considered:

Player	Record	Win %	Hard	Clay	Grass	Last match
Number 2 ranked players						
(Germany) **Alexander Zverev**	1–0	100%	1–0	–	–	Won (6–2, 7–6^{(7–4)}) at 2023 Davis Cup QR
(Italy) **Jannik Sinner**	1–1	50%	1–1	–	–	Won (6–2, 6–3) at 2022 Paris 1R
Number 3 ranked players						
(Austria) **Dominic Thiem**	0–1	0%	–	0–1	–	Lost (7–5, 4–6, 4–6) at 2023 Munich 2R
Number 4 ranked players						
(Denmark) **Holger Rune**	2–1	67%	1–1	1–0	–	Lost (6–7^{(5–7)}, 2–6) at 2023 Montpellier 2R
Number 6 ranked players						
(Canada) **Félix Auger-Aliassime**	0–1	0%	0–1	–	–	Lost (7–6^{(7–3)}, 4–6, 4–6) at 2022 Basel 1R
Number 7 ranked players						
(France) **Richard Gasquet**	0–1	0%	0–1	–	–	Lost (4–6, 4–6) at 2023 Winston-Salem 1R
Number 8 ranked players						
(Russia) **Karen Khachanov**	0–3	0%	0–3	–	–	Lost (4–6, 4–6) at 2023 Adelaide 2 2R
Number 9 ranked players						
(Spain) Nicolás Almagro	1–0	100%	–	1–0	–	Won (6–7^{(8–10)}, 6–3, 7–6^{(7–4)}) at 2018 Gstaad 1R
(Italy) **Fabio Fognini**	1–0	100%	–	1–0	–	Won (6–1, 6–2) at 2020 Kitzbühel 2R
Number 10 ranked players						
(Spain) **Pablo Carreño Busta**	1–0	100%	1–0	–	–	Won (6–3, 3–6, 6–2) at 2022 Sofia 2R
(Canada) **Denis Shapovalov**	0–1	0%	0–1	–	–	Lost (6–2, 4–6, 4–6, 6–3, 1–6) at 2022 US Open 1R
Total	7–9	43.75%	4–8 (33.33%)	3–1 (75%)	0–0 ( – )	* Statistics correct as of 21 August 2023.
