= Liam Broady =

British tennis player (born 1994)

- Broady at 2026 Wimbledon Championships
- Country (sports): (United Kingdom) Great Britain
- Residence: Stockport, England
- Born: 4 January 1994 (age 32) Stockport, England
- Height: 1.83 m (6 ft 0 in)
- Turned pro: 2014
- Plays: Left-handed (two-handed backhand)
- Coach: David Sammel (2014, 2017–2024), Alex Jhun (2025–)
- Prize money: US $2,558,269

Singles
- Career record: 21–34
- Career titles: 0
- Highest ranking: No. 93 (25 September 2023)
- Current ranking: No. 259 (16 November 2026)

Grand Slam singles results
- Australian Open: 1R (2022)
- French Open: 1R (2020)
- Wimbledon: 3R (2022, 2023)
- US Open: Q3 (2023)

Other tournaments
- Olympic Games: 3R (2021)

Doubles
- Career record: 4–15
- Career titles: 0
- Highest ranking: No. 217 (6 August 2018)
- Current ranking: No. 372 (16 November 2026)

Grand Slam doubles results
- Wimbledon: 2R (2018)

Grand Slam mixed doubles results
- Wimbledon: 2R (2017)

Team competitions
- Davis Cup: 1R (2018)
- Last updated on: 17 November 2026.

Liam Broady (/ˈbroʊdi/ BROH-dee; born 4 January 1994) is a British professional tennis player who competes mainly on the ATP Challenger Tour. He reached a career high ranking of world No. 93 on 25 September 2023 and a doubles ranking of No. 217 achieved on 6 August 2018.

== Early and personal life ==
Broady, the younger brother of fellow tennis player Naomi Broady, has another sister, Emma and a brother, Calum. The family grew up in Heaton Chapel, Stockport. Their parents, Shirley and Simon, took the young Liam and Naomi to tennis tournaments.

Broady started playing table tennis at the age of four and went to Matchpoint in Bramhall for lessons. His first tournament was at the age of eight and he showed potential at ten.

He attended Norris Bank primary and Priestnall School where he completed his GCSEs in 2010.

In 2007, the Lawn Tennis Association suspended his seventeen-year-old sister Naomi's funding, for 'unprofessional' postings on a social networking site. Their father Simon was so angry with the decision that he withdrew Liam, then aged thirteen, from the LTA programme. Simon sold the family home and downsized to a modest red brick terrace to fund their travel and coaching. Two weeks later, the LTA offered to restore their funding, but Simon refused, and they trained at the Mouratoglou Tennis Academy on the outskirts of Paris.

In 2012, Broady decided to accept help from the LTA, leading to his estrangement from his father, and they did not speak to each other for several years. When Liam returned to Stockport, he stayed with his sister Emma. In November 2015, Broady ended his LTA funding to heal the rift with his father, and funded himself, renting his own flat in the Heatons, Stockport. Broady trained at the Northern Tennis Club, David Lloyd Fitness and Life Leisure by Broadstone Mill. Broady played Davis Cup for the 2018 tie against Spain, while Naomi Broady has declined to play Fed Cup for Great Britain.

In late 2016 he moved his training base to the University of Bath and was coached by David Sammel.

Broady is a fan of Premier League football club Manchester City.

== Junior career ==
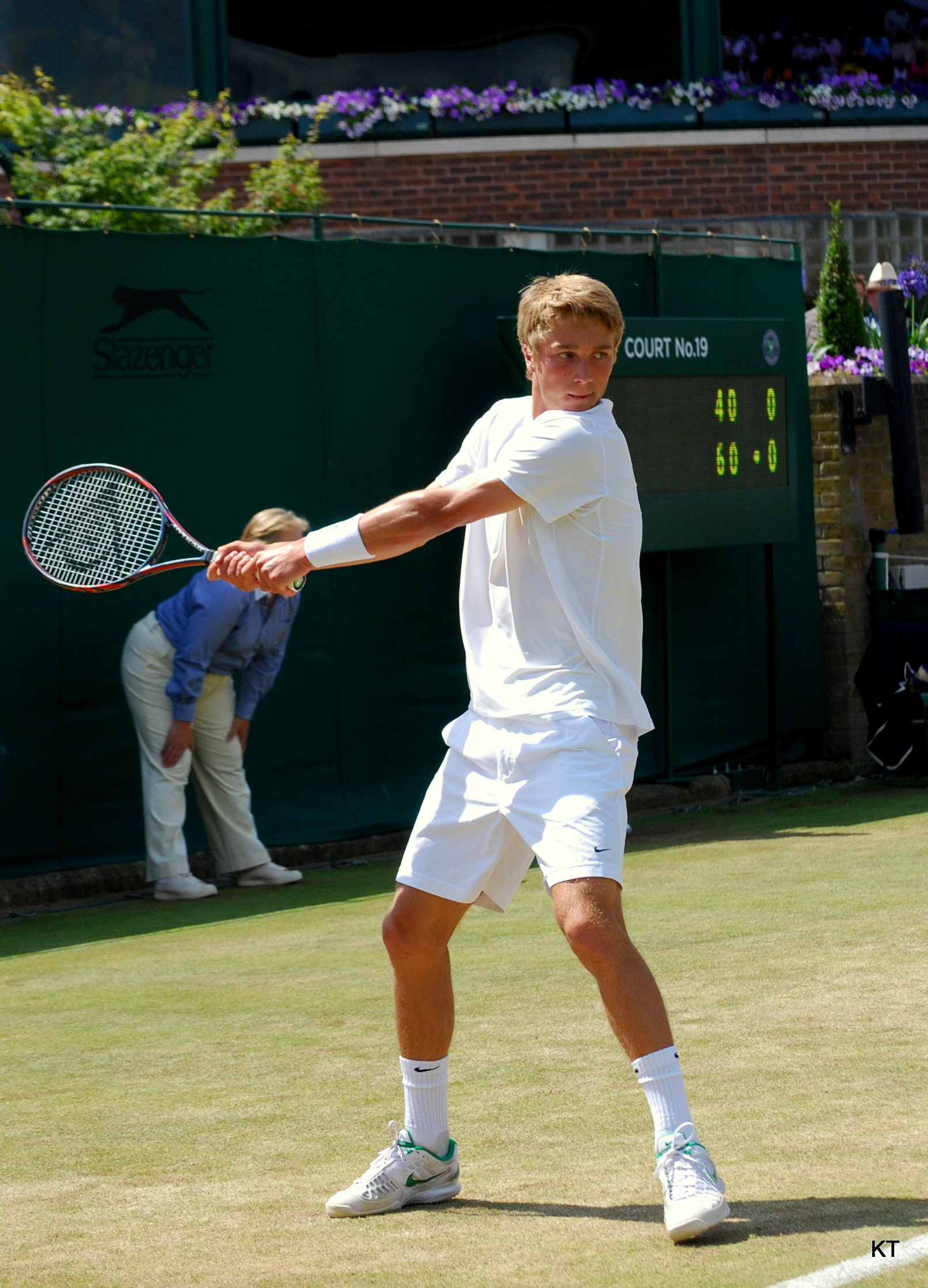
Broady playing at the 2011 Wimbledon Junior Championships

In 2005 Broady won the Natwest Dorset Open which marked the start of his career. In 2008, he was crowned European Masters under-14 champion in Orbetello, Italy – a title once won by Rafael Nadal.

At the 2010 Wimbledon Championships, Broady partnered Tom Farquharson to participate in the Boys doubles where they defeated fellow Britons Lewis Burton and George Morgan. The pair became the first British partnership to win the title since 1995.

At Wimbledon in 2011, Broady beat Germany's Robin Kern 7–6 ^{(7–4)}, 4–6, 13–11 to reach the semifinals of the boys' singles and followed that victory with another against Australian Jason Kubler with the match ending 6–4, 6–3 in the Brit's favour to ensure a place in the final. He lost in the final 6–2, 4–6, 2–6 to Australian Luke Saville. Broady finished 2011 by partnering Joshua Ward–Hibbert to the Dunlop Orange Bowl doubles title.

The 2012 season saw Broady win the Boys' Doubles at the Australian Open with Joshua Ward-Hibbert, reach the boys' semifinals at the US Open 2012 for the first time, and go on to make the final, where he lost against Filip Peliwo 2–6, 6–2, 5–7 in a tightly fought match.

As a junior Broady has reached as high as No. 2 in the junior combined world rankings in March 2012.

=== Junior Slam results – Singles ===
- French Open: 3R (2012)
- Wimbledon: F (2011)
- US Open: F (2012)

=== Junior Slam results – Doubles ===
- Australian Open: W (2012)
- French Open: QF (2012)
- Wimbledon: W (2010)
- US Open: QF (2011)

== Professional career ==
=== 2009–2011 ===
In 2009, at the age of 15, Broady began playing on the Futures Circuit, both in singles and doubles. In July 2009, Broady won his first main draw singles match against the 19-year-old Duncan Mugabe at the GB F8 in Felixstowe.

In 2010, Broady beat four adult players on the Futures tour.

In February 2011, Broady reached the semifinals of the France F3 in Bressuire. In July 2011, Broady won his first doubles title with Dan Evans at the Chiswick GB Futures F11. Elsewhere, he lost the first or second rounds in 13 out of 18 singles tournaments. Broady was coached by Mark Hilton at Nottingham.

=== 2012 ===
Broady's difficulties continued with 7 first round defeats, and he considered giving up. So, now eighteen years old, he left the Mouratoglou Tennis Academy to accept funding from the LTA, causing a rift with his father, and they did not speak to each other until 2015. Mark Hilton became his full-time coach. In November, Broady made the semifinals of the USA F30 in Florida.

=== 2013 ===
Broady reached three singles and seven doubles finals at Futures level, winning one singles title and four doubles titles with partner Joshua Ward-Hibbert, including three on home soil. He began competing more regularly on the Challenger Tour, and as a result saw his ranking rise more steadily.

=== 2014: First Challenger final, Top 200 debut ===
Broady, having added David Sammel to his team appeared in his first Challenger final in November, facing James Duckworth in the final of the Charlottesville Challenger, where he ultimately lost in three sets; however, his run to the final launched him into the top 200 for the first time, with a career-high ranking of No. 188 in the world. Throughout 2014, Broady's ranking rose up 271 places from No. 470 at the beginning of the year, becoming the 3rd ranked British player.

=== 2015: Grand Slam debut and first singles win ===
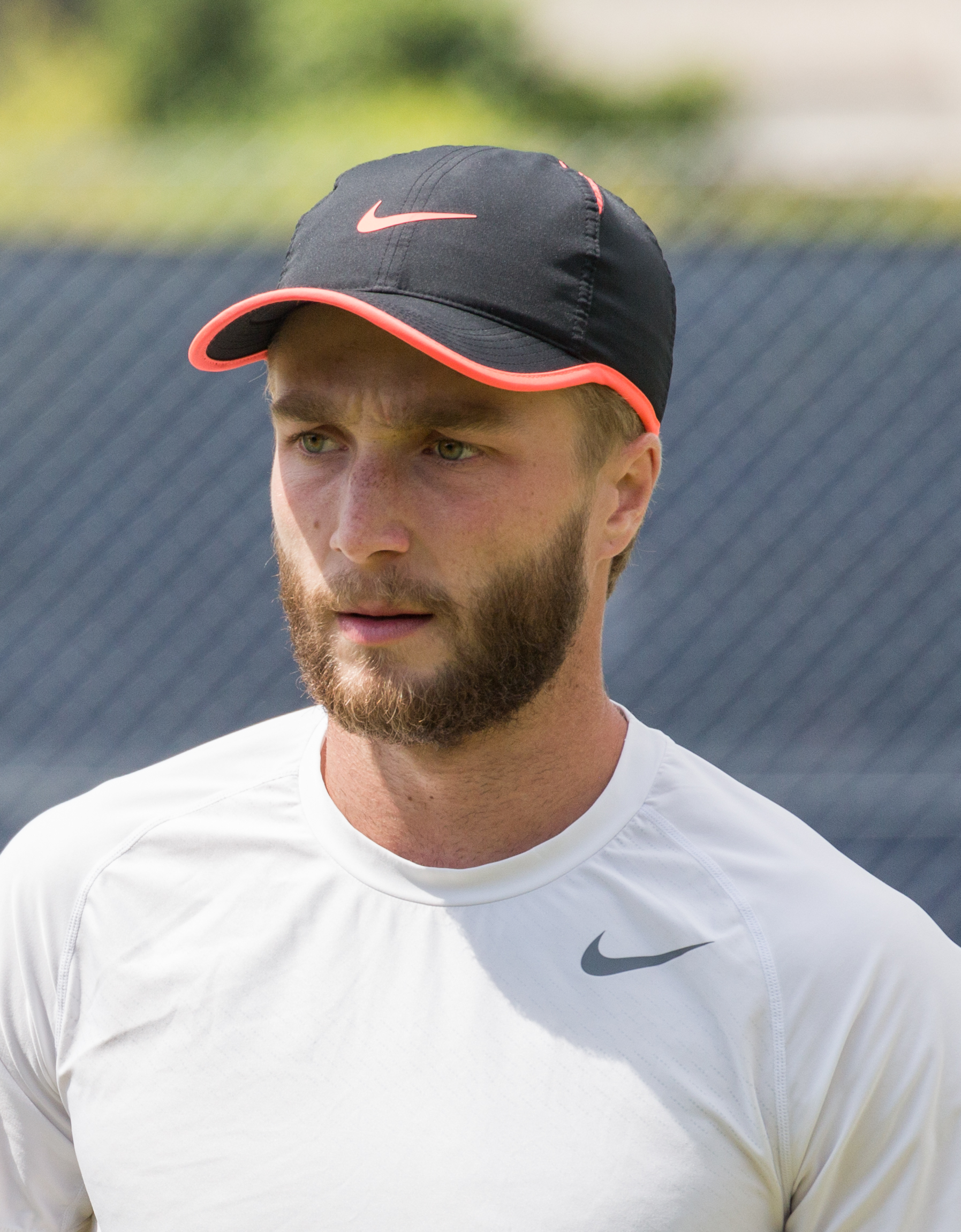
Broady at the Aegon Surbiton Trophy in 2015

Broady came from two sets down to win his first singles match as a wildcard at Wimbledon against Marinko Matosevic. He lost in the second round to David Goffin.

=== 2016: Loss of form ===
In February, Broady won the Great Britain F1 Futures held in Glasgow. On the Challenger circuit, he appeared in the Taipei semi final, and two quarter finals. He was defeated in the first round of Wimbledon by British number one Andy Murray. It was the first all-British meeting at the All England Club since Tim Henman beat Martin Lee in 2001.

=== 2017: Two Challenger finals, return to top 200 ===
At the 2017 St. Petersburg Open in September, Broady qualified for the main draw to become the first Team Bath Tennis player to reach the quarterfinals of an ATP World Tour singles tournament. He followed that up by finishing runner-up in the Las Vegas Tennis Open, an ATP Challenger Tour event, in October.

=== 2018: Davis Cup debut, loss of form ===
Broady lost in the first round of qualifying draw for the Australian Open, marking seven failures to qualify for Grand Slam main draws in seven attempts. In February, Broady made his Davis Cup debut representing Great Britain. He performed well but lost in straight sets to Albert Ramos Viñolas, leaving the British team 0–1 down against Spain. In March, Broady qualified for the first round of the 2018 Miami Open main draw, for the first time at the Masters 1000 level. He defeated Bjorn Fratangelo in straight sets to reach for the first time, the second round at a Masters.

Broady had a predominantly disappointing second half of the season; he went out of Wimbledon in the first round against Milos Raonic who went on to reach the quarterfinals, and despite reaching the quarterfinals in two US Challenger tournaments in Aptos and Stockton, Broady ended the year ranked No. 273 in the world.

=== 2019: Challenger final, Wimbledon near-miss ===
Broady reached his fourth Challenger final in April, winning five matches including against future top 50 player Alexander Bublik before losing 6–4, 4–6, 6–3 to Blaž Rola. His attempt to qualify for the 2019 Wimbledon Championships was denied. After victories over Andrej Martin and Tallon Griekspoor, Broady led Frenchman Grégoire Barrère by two sets to love before being pegged back to lose 3–6, 0–6, 6–2, 6–4, 6–3.

Broady ended the season on a high reaching the Knoxville Challenger semifinal following wins over Americans Donald Young and Marcos Giron losing to eventual champion Michael Mmoh, which meant he finished the year ranked No. 240.

=== 2020: COVID season, French Open debut, Challenger final ===
Broady reached a Challenger semifinal in Calgary, Canada, losing to Maxime Cressy before the tennis season was suspended due to COVID.

After the sport returned, he entered the main draw of 2020 French Open, his first Grand slam qualification with wins over Nicola Kuhn (6–4, 7–6), Botic van de Zandschulp (7–6, 7–6) and Marc Polmans (7–6, 6–4). In the main draw, Broady was beaten in the first round by Czech Jiří Veselý 6–2, 5–7, 6–3, 6–2. He ended the year by reaching his fifth Challenger final in Parma, Italy, where he lost to German Cedrik-Marcel Stebe.

=== 2021: First Challenger title, top 150, Olympic debut ===
Following a lengthy break due to the Coronavirus pandemic, Broady started the new season well reaching consecutive ATP Challenger finals and qualifying for the first round of the Miami Masters main draw. Consequently, Broady entered the top 150 for the first time in his career reaching a career-high singles ranking of No. 137 on 19 April 2021.

He played in a doubles partnership with Andy Murray in the 2021 Italian Open (tennis) in Rome in May. They beat Australians Max Purcell and Luke Saville in the first round, but were beaten by Kevin Krawietz and Horia Tecău in the second round.

He received a wildcard to enter the 2021 Wimbledon Championships, and reached the second round for a second time in his career, defeating Marco Cecchinato in straight sets.

Ranked 143rd in the world, Broady upset seventh seeded Wimbledon semi-finalist and World No. 12 Hubert Hurkacz at the Olympics, his biggest win in his career, in order to reach the third round.

In September, he secured his first ATP Challenger title in Biel/ Bienne in Switzerland after losing his previous seven Challenger finals. He won all five matches without dropping a set defeating Marc-Andrea Hüsler 7–5, 6–3 in the final in front of the Swiss man's home crowd. This win moved Broady to a career high 126 in the world and inside the top 100 in the ATP Race denoting performances in 2021 alone.

=== 2022: Wimbledon third round ===
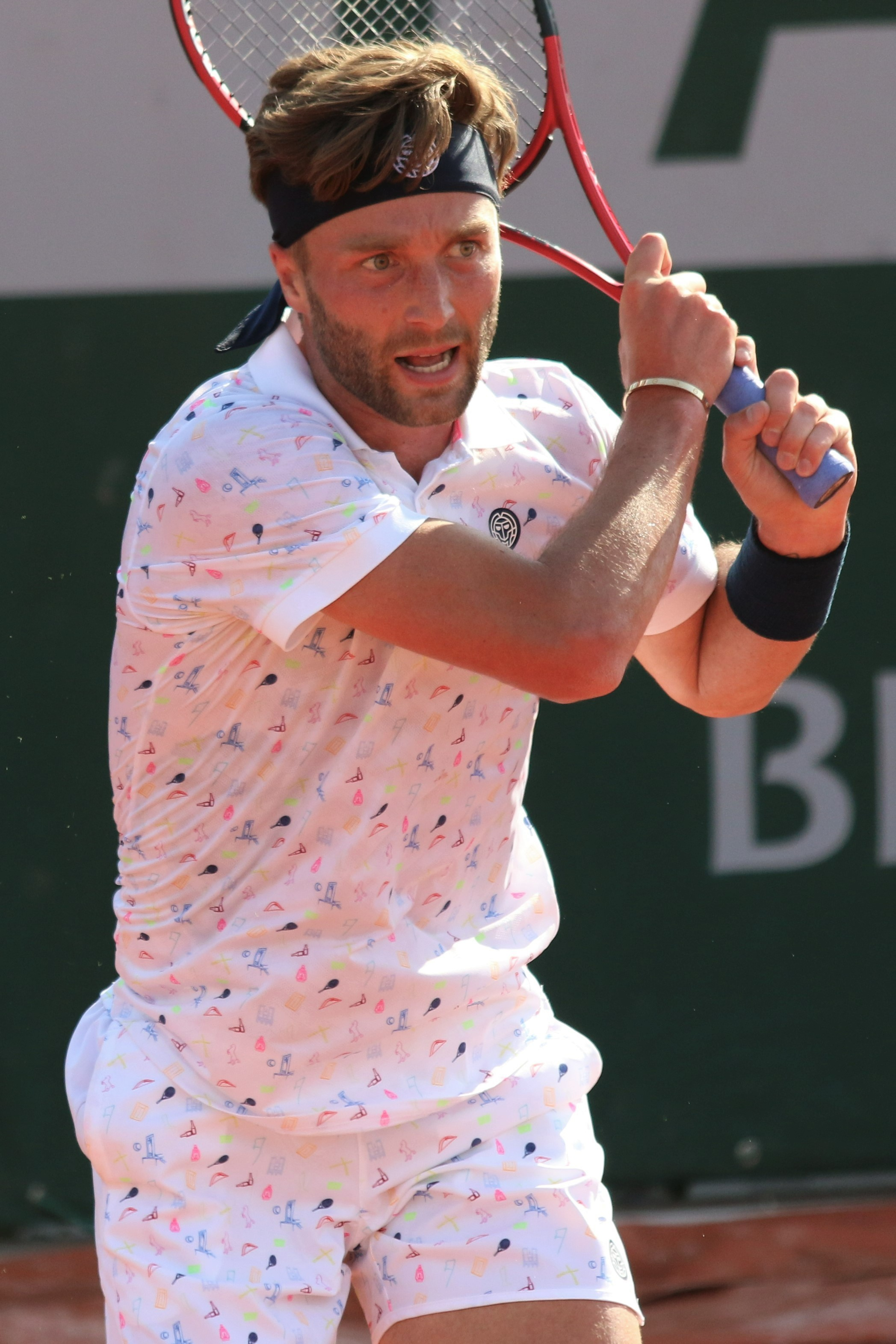
Broady at the 2022 French Open

Broady made a successful start to the 2022 season, having been captain of the GB team at the 2022 ATP Cup, his opening tournament saw him qualify for the 2022 Australian Open with three come-from behind wins against Kacper Żuk 4–6, 6–1, 6–2, J. J. Wolf 3–6, 6–4, 6–4 and Roman Safiullin 4–6, 7–6^{(7–2)}, 6–2. He drew Australian Nick Kyrgios in the first round and lost in straight sets.

At the 2022 Wimbledon Championships Broady recorded two Major wins as a wildcard, to reach the third round for the first time at a Grand Slam, over Lukáš Klein and 12th seed Diego Schwartzman, both matches going to five sets.

=== 2023–2026: Second Wimbledon third round, top 100 ===
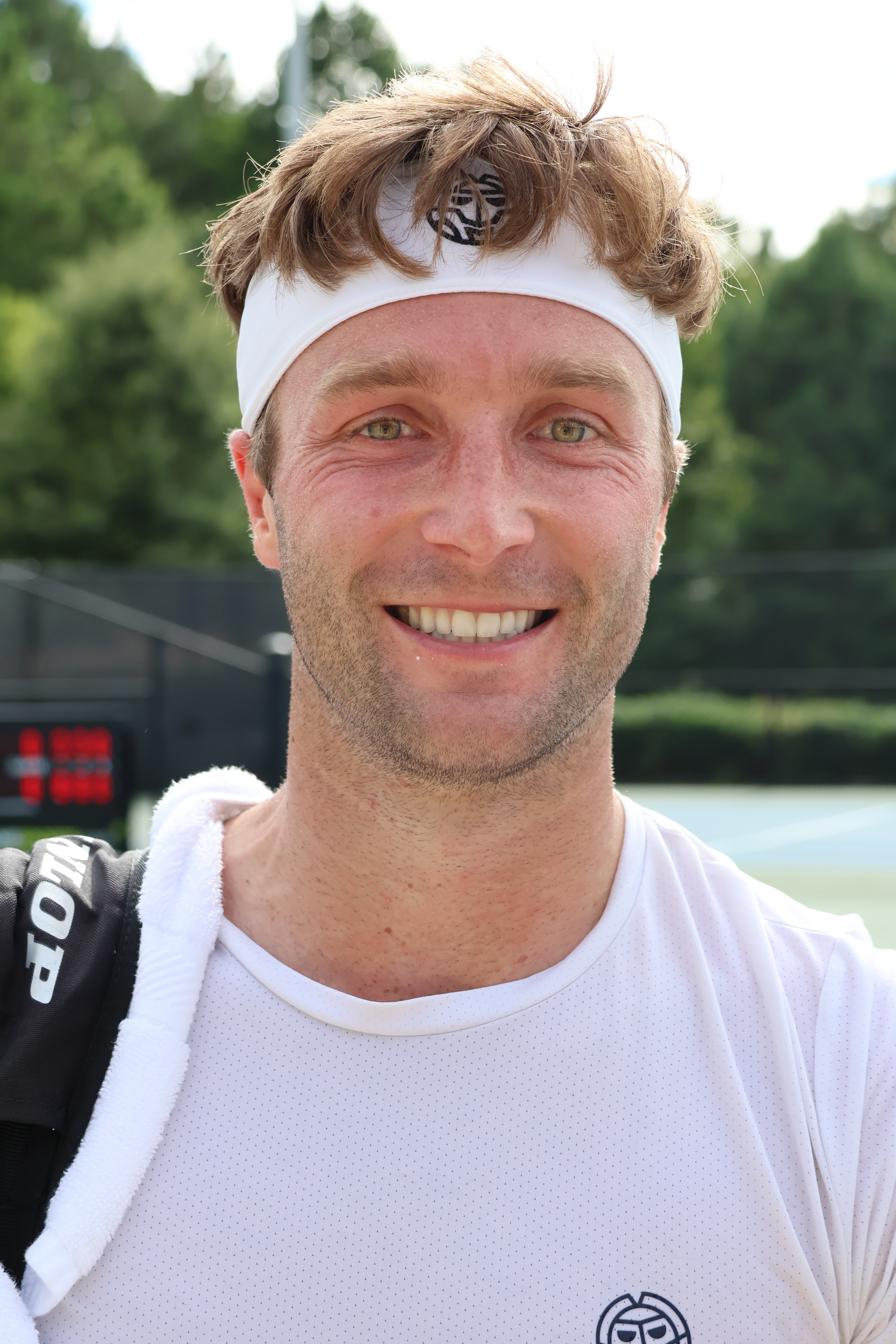
Bolt at the 2023 Cary Challenger

Broady qualified in Doha and won his first round match against Oleksii Krutykh in three sets, before losing to third seed Daniil Medvedev in his next match. He won his second Challenger title, the 2023 Vitas Gerulaitis Cup in Vilnius. He entered the 2023 Banja Luka Open as lucky loser but lost to Damir Džumhur.

Partnering with Jonny O'Mara he won his first doubles Challenger, the 2023 Surbiton Trophy, and also reached the final at the 2023 Nottingham Open. At the 2023 Wimbledon Championships, Broady reached a second consecutive third round defeating world No. 4 Casper Ruud for his first top-10 and top-5 win. He lost to 26th seed Denis Shapovalov.

He reached the top 100 on 25 September 2023 following a Challenger final showing at the 2023 Saint-Tropez Open.

In 2024, he received a fourth consecutive wildcard for the Wimbledon Championships but lost in the first round to Botic van de Zandschulp.

Broady reached the final at the 2025 All In Open, losing to sixth seed Jan-Lennard Struff.

He won his third WTA Challenger singles title at the 2026 Miyazaki Challenger, defeating fellow Briton and seventh seed Harry Wendelken in the final.

== Singles performance timeline ==
Key
W	F	SF	QF	#R	RR	Q#	DNQ	A	NH

(W) winner; (F) finalist; (SF) semifinalist; (QF) quarterfinalist; (#R) rounds 4, 3, 2, 1; (RR) round-robin stage; (Q#) qualification round; (DNQ) did not qualify; (A) absent; (NH) not held; (SR) strike rate (events won / competed); (W–L) win–loss record.
To avoid confusion and double counting, these charts are updated at the conclusion of a tournament or when the player's participation has ended.

Current through the 2024 US Open – Men's singles qualifying.

Tournament	2011	2012	2013	2014	2015	2016	2017	2018	2019	2020	2021	2022	2023	2024	SR	W–L
Grand Slam tournaments
Australian Open	A	A	A	A	Q3	A	A	Q1	A	Q1	Q1	1R	Q1	A	0 / 1	0–1
French Open	A	A	A	A	Q1	A	A	Q1	A	1R	Q2	Q2	Q2	A	0 / 1	0–1
Wimbledon	Q2	Q1	A	A	2R	1R	Q2	1R	Q3	NH	2R	3R	3R	1R	0 / 7	6–7
US Open	A	A	A	A	Q1	A	A	Q2	A	A	Q2	Q2	Q3	Q1	0 / 0	0–0
Win–loss	0–0	0–0	0–0	0–0	1–1	0–1	0–0	0–1	0–0	0–1	1–1	2–2	2–1	0–1	0 / 9	6–9
National representation
Summer Olympics	NH	A	NH			A	NH				3R	NH		A	0 / 1	2–1
Davis Cup	A	A	A	A	A	A	A	1R	A	A	A	A	A	A	0 / 1	0–1
ATP Tour Masters 1000
Indian Wells Masters	A	A	A	A	A	A	A	Q1	A	NH	A	1R	A	A	0 / 1	0–1
Miami Open	A	A	A	A	A	A	A	2R	A	NH	1R	Q1	A	A	0 / 2	1–2
Canadian Open	A	A	A	A	A	A	A	A	A	NH	Q2	A	A	A	0 / 0	0–0
Win–loss	0–0	0–0	0–0	0–0	0–0	0–0	0–0	1–1	0–0	0–0	0–1	0–1	0–0	0–0	0 / 3	1–3
Career statistics
Tournaments	0	1	0	0	1	2	2	2	0	1	6	7	7	4	33	
Overall win–loss	0–0	0–1	0–0	0–0	1–1	0–2	2–2	1–3	0–0	0–1	5–6	5–7	6–7	1–4	21–34	
Year-end ranking	662	885	473	196	301	302	170	273	240	188	128	163	103	546	38%	

== ATP Challenger and ITF Tour finals ==
=== Singles: 32 (14–18) ===
Legend ATP Challengers (3–10) ITF Futures (11–8)	Finals by surface Hard (12–18) Clay (2–0) Grass (0–0)

Result	W–L	Date	Tournament	Tier	Surface	Opponent	Score
Win	1–0	Sep 2013	Great Britain F18, Sheffield	Futures	Hard	(United Kingdom) Robert Carter	6–2, 6–1
Loss	1–1	Oct 2013	Israel F15, Herzliya	Futures	Hard	(Italy) Claudio Fortuna	6–1, 1–6, 5–7
Loss	1–2	Dec 2013	Qatar F3, Doha	Futures	Hard	(Republic of Ireland) Sam Barry	6–7^{(2–7)}, 4–6
Win	2–2	Apr 2014	Great Britain F9, Bournemouth	Futures	Clay	(United Kingdom) Luke Bambridge	7–5, 6–2
Loss	2–3	Jul 2014	USA F20, Tulsa	Futures	Hard	(United States) Mitchell Frank	2–6, 1–6
Loss	2–4	Aug 2014	USA F22, Decatur	Futures	Hard	(United States) Bjorn Fratangelo	4–6, 0–6
Win	3–4	Aug 2014	Canada F8, Winnipeg	Futures	Hard	(Australia) Blake Mott	6–3, 6–4
Win	4–4	Sep 2014	Great Britain F16, Wrexham	Futures	Hard	(United Kingdom) Edward Corrie	3–6, 7–5, 7–6^{(8–6)}
Win	5–4	Oct 2014	USA F28, Mansfield	Futures	Hard	(Bulgaria) Dimitar Kutrovsky	1–6, 7–6^{(7–2)}, 6–0
Loss	5–5	Nov 2014	Charlottesville, US	Challenger	Hard (i)	(Australia) James Duckworth	7–5, 3–6, 2–6
Win	6–5	Oct 2015	Turkey F39, Antalya	Futures	Hard	(United Kingdom) Luke Bambridge	7–5, 6–3
Win	7–5	Feb 2016	Great Britain F1, Glasgow	Futures	Hard (i)	(Switzerland) Adrien Bossel	6–3, 4–6, 6–2
Loss	7–6	Jan 2017	Turkey F1, Antalya	Futures	Hard	(Poland) Kamil Majchrzak	7–5, 3–6, 3–6
Loss	7–7	Aug 2017	Aptos, US	Challenger	Hard	(Kazakhstan) Alexander Bublik	2–6, 3–6
Loss	7–8	Oct 2017	Las Vegas, US	Challenger	Hard	(United States) Stefan Kozlov	6–3, 5–7, 4–6
Loss	7–9	Apr 2019	León, Mexico	Challenger	Hard	(Slovenia) Blaž Rola	4–6, 6–4, 3–6
Loss	7–10	Oct 2019	M25 Claremont, US	Futures	Hard	(Belgium) Michael Geerts	3–6, 2–6
Loss	7–11	Nov 2020	Parma, Italy	Challenger	Hard (i)	(Germany) Cedrik-Marcel Stebe	4–6, 4–6
Loss	7–12	Feb 2021	Potchefstroom, South Africa	Challenger	Hard	(France) Benjamin Bonzi	5–7, 4–6
Loss	7–13	Mar 2021	Biella, Italy	Challenger	Hard (i)	(Italy) Andreas Seppi	2–6, 1–6
Win	8–13	Sep 2021	Biel/Bienne, Switzerland	Challenger	Hard (i)	(Switzerland) Marc-Andrea Hüsler	7–5, 6–3
Win	9–13	Feb 2023	Vilnius, Lithuania	Challenger	Hard (i)	(Czech Republic) Zdeněk Kolář	6–4, 6–4
Loss	9–14	Mar 2023	Biel/Bienne, Switzerland	Challenger	Hard (i)	(Austria) Jurij Rodionov	3–6, 0–0 ret.
Loss	9–15	Sep 2023	Saint-Tropez, France	Challenger	Hard	(France) Constant Lestienne	6–4, 3–6, 4–6
Win	10–15	Mar 2025	M15 Foggia, Italy	WTT	Clay	(Italy) Iannis Miletich	6–1, 6–3
Win	11–15	Aug 2025	M15 Budapest, Hungary	WTT	Hard	(Hungary) Mátyás Füle	2–6, 6–0, 6–0
Loss	11–16	Sep 2025	M15 Hurghada, Egypt	WTT	Hard	(United Kingdom) Toby Samuel	6–1, 6–2
Win	12–16	Sep 2025	M15 Budapest, Hungary	WTT	Hard	(Hungary) Mátyás Füle	6–2, 6–1
Win	13–16	Oct 2025	M15 Rodez, France	WTT	Hard (i)	(France) Arthur Nagel	6–4, 6–4
Loss	13–17	Oct 2025	M15 Villers-lès-Nancy, France	WTT	Hard (i)	(France) Robin Catry	6–2, 2–6, 4–6
Loss	13–18	Nov 2025	Lyon, France	Challenger	Hard (i)	(Germany) Jan-Lennard Struff	4–6, 4–6
Win	14–18	Mar 2026	Miyazaki, Japan	Challenger	Hard	(United Kingdom) Harry Wendelken	3–6, 6–2, 6–2

=== Doubles: 32 (15–17) ===
Legend ATP Challengers (1–5) ITF Futures / WTT (14–12)	Finals by surface Hard (11–13) Clay (3–3) Grass (1–1) Carpet (0–0)

Result	W–L	Date	Tournament	Tier	Surface	Partner	Opponents	Score
Win	1–0	Jul 2011	Great Britain F11, Chiswick	Futures	Hard	(United Kingdom) Dan Evans	(United Kingdom) Lewis Burton (United Kingdom) Edward Corrie	7–6^{(7–3)}, 4–6, [10–7]
Win	2–0	May 2012	Great Britain F8, Newcastle	Futures	Clay	(United Kingdom) Daniel Smethurst	(United Kingdom) Jack Carpenter (United Kingdom) Ashley Hewitt	7–6^{(8–6)}, 6–0
Win	3–0	May 2013	Egypt F8, Sharm El Sheikh	Futures	Clay	(United Kingdom) Joshua Ward-Hibbert	(Italy) Marco Crugnola (Italy) Riccardo Sinicropi	6–3, 7–5
Loss	3–1	Jun 2013	Egypt F9, Sharm El Sheikh	Futures	Clay	(United Kingdom) Joshua Ward-Hibbert	(Belgium) Joris De Loore (Belgium) Jeroen Vanneste	2–6, 2–6
Win	4–1	Aug 2013	Great Britain F15, Nottingham	Futures	Hard	(United Kingdom) Joshua Ward-Hibbert	(United Kingdom) Scott Clayton (United Kingdom) Toby Martin	4–6, 6–3, [10–6]
Win	5–1	Aug 2013	Great Britain F16, Chiswick	Futures	Hard	(United Kingdom) Joshua Ward-Hibbert	(United Kingdom) David Rice (United Kingdom) Sean Thornley	7–6^{(7–5)}, 2–6, [10–6]
Loss	5–2	Aug 2013	Great Britain F17, Wrexham	Futures	Hard	(United Kingdom) Joshua Ward-Hibbert	(United Kingdom) George Coupland (United Kingdom) Marcus Willis	6–7^{(6–8)}, 3–6
Win	6–2	Oct 2013	Israel F13, Akko	Futures	Hard	(United Kingdom) Joshua Ward-Hibbert	(Slovakia) Ivo Klec (Czech Republic) Michal Schmid	6–3, 6–0
Loss	6–3	Oct 2013	Israel F14, Ramat HaSharon	Futures	Hard	(United Kingdom) Joshua Ward-Hibbert	(United Kingdom) Luke Bambridge (United Kingdom) Evan Hoyt	6–7^{(5–7)}, 6–7^{(4–7)}
Loss	6–4	Feb 2014	Great Britain F5, Nottingham	Futures	Hard (i)	(Republic of Ireland) James Cluskey	(France) Rémi Boutillier (France) Quentin Halys	2–6, 6–0, [8–10]
Win	7–4	Mar 2014	Great Britain F6, Preston	Futures	Hard (i)	(United Kingdom) Luke Bambridge	(Denmark) Frederik Nielsen (United Kingdom) Joshua Ward-Hibbert	6–4, 6–4
Loss	7–5	Mar 2014	Bahrain F1, Manama	Futures	Hard	(United Kingdom) Joshua Ward-Hibbert	(Spain) Jaime Pulgar-Garcia (Spain) Javier Pulgar-Garcia	2–6, 6–2, [6–10]
Win	8–5	Apr 2014	Qatar F4, Doha	Futures	Hard	(United Kingdom) Joshua Ward-Hibbert	(Italy) Lorenzo Frigerio (Italy) Luca Vanni	6–3, 7–5
Loss	8–6	Jun 2014	USA F16, Buffalo	Futures	Clay	(United Kingdom) Luke Bambridge	(United States) Jean-Yves Aubone (United States) Connor Smith	3–6, 6–2, [6–10]
Loss	8–7	Jun 2014	USA F18, Rochester	Futures	Clay	(United Kingdom) Luke Bambridge	(United States) Daniel Nguyen (United States) Connor Smith	3–6, 3–6
Win	9–7	Jul 2014	USA F19, Pittsburgh	Futures	Clay	(United Kingdom) Luke Bambridge	(United States) Gonzales Austin (United States) Quinton Vega	7–5, 6–4
Win	10–7	Jul 2014	USA F20, Tulsa	Futures	Hard	(United Kingdom) Luke Bambridge	(Mexico) Daniel Garza (Mexico) Raul Isaias Rosas-Zarur	6–4, 5–2 ret.
Win	11–7	Jul 2014	USA F21, Godfrey	Futures	Hard	(United Kingdom) Luke Bambridge	(United States) Brett D. Clark (United States) Ronnie Schneider	6–3, 6–2
Win	12–7	Jul 2014	USA F22, Decatur	Futures	Hard	(United Kingdom) Luke Bambridge	(United Kingdom) Scott Clayton (United Kingdom) Toby Martin	5–7, 6–2, [10–7]
Loss	12–8	Sep 2014	Great Britain F16, Wrexham	Futures	Hard	(United Kingdom) Luke Bambridge	(United Kingdom) Edward Corrie (United Kingdom) David Rice	7–6^{(7–3)}, 4–6, [8–10]
Win	13–8	Oct 2014	USA F28, Mansfield	Futures	Hard	(United States) Dennis Novikov	(Brazil) Henrique Cunha (Bulgaria) Dimitar Kutrovsky	4–6, 6–3, [10–7]
Loss	13–9	Mar 2015	Israel F3, Ramat HaSharon	Futures	Hard	(United States) Jean-Yves Aubone	(Poland) Andriej Kapaś (Slovakia) Adrian Sikora	6–7^{(3–7)}, 5–7
Loss	13–10	Oct 2015	USA F28, Mansfield	Futures	Hard	(Australia) Ashley Fisher	(Mexico) Hans Hach Verdugo (United States) Eric Quigley	5–7, 3–6
Loss	13–11	Mar 2016	Canada F2, Sherbrooke	Futures	Hard (i)	(United Kingdom) Luke Bambridge	(South Africa) Keith-Patrick Crowley (United States) Max Schnur	6–3, 6–7^{(3–7)}, [6–10]
Loss	13–12	Jul 2016	Binghamton, US	Challenger	Hard	(Brazil) Guilherme Clezar	(Australia) Matt Reid (Australia) John-Patrick Smith	4–6, 2–6
Loss	13–13	Nov 2016	Champaign, US	Challenger	Hard (i)	(United Kingdom) Luke Bambridge	(United States) Austin Krajicek (United States) Tennys Sandgren	6–7^{(4–7)}, 6–7^{(2–7)}
Loss	13–14	Jan 2017	Turkey F1, Antalya	Futures	Hard	(United Kingdom) Luke Johnson	(Norway) Viktor Durasovic (Croatia) Nino Serdarušić	3–6, 3–6
Loss	13–15	Jul 2018	Granby, Canada	Challenger	Hard	(United States) JC Aragone	(United States) Alex Lawson (China) Li Zhe	6–7^{(2–7)}, 3–6
Win	14–15	Jun 2023	Surbiton, UK	Challenger	Grass	(United Kingdom) Jonny O'Mara	(Australia) Alexei Popyrin (Australia) Aleksandar Vukic	6–4, 5–7, [10–8]
Loss	14–16	Jun 2023	Nottingham, UK	Challenger	Grass	(United Kingdom) Jonny O'Mara	(United Kingdom) Johannus Monday (United Kingdom) Jacob Fearnley	3–6, 7–6, [7–10]
Loss	14-17	Sep 2023	Cassis, France	Challenger	Hard	(France) Antoine Hoang	(France) Dan Added (France) Jonathan Eysseric	0–6, 6–4, [9–11]
Win	15–17	Jun 2025	M25 Elvas, Portugal	WTT	Hard	(United Kingdom) Charlie Robertson	(France) Dan Added (Estonia) Johannes Seeman	7–5, 6–2

== Junior Grand Slam finals ==
=== Singles: 2 (0–2) ===
Result	Year	Tournament	Surface	Opponent	Score
Loss	2011	Wimbledon Championships	Grass	(Australia) Luke Saville	6–2, 4–6, 2–6
Loss	2012	US Open	Hard	(Canada) Filip Peliwo	2–6, 6–2, 5–7

=== Doubles: 2 (2–0) ===
Result	Year	Tournament	Surface	Partner	Opponents	Score
Win	2010	Wimbledon Championships	Grass	(United Kingdom) Tom Farquharson	(United Kingdom) Lewis Burton (United Kingdom) George Morgan	7–6^{(7–4)}, 6–4
Win	2012	Australian Open	Hard	(United Kingdom) Joshua Ward-Hibbert	(Czech Republic) Adam Pavlásek (Croatia) Filip Veger	6–3, 6–2

== Wins over top-10 opponents ==
- He has a 1–2 record against players who were, at the time the match was played, ranked in the top 10.

Season	2014	2015	2016	2017	2018	2019	2020	2021	2022	2023	Total
Wins	0	0	0	0	0	0	0	0	0	1	1

#	Player	Rank	Event	Surface	Rd	Score	LBR
2023
1.	(Norway) Casper Ruud	4	Wimbledon, United Kingdom	Grass	2R	6–4, 3–6, 4–6, 6–3, 6–0	142
