= 2021 Biella Challenger Indoor III – Doubles =

Doubles
- 2021 Biella Challenger Indoor III

Final
- Champions: (France) Quentin Halys (France) Tristan Lamasine
- Runners-up: (Ukraine) Denys Molchanov (Ukraine) Sergiy Stakhovsky
- Score: 6–1, 2–0 ret.

Events
Singles	Doubles
← 2021 ·	Biella Challenger Indoor	· 2021 →

Hugo Nys and Tim Pütz were the defending champions but chose not to defend their title.

Quentin Halys and Tristan Lamasine won the title after Denys Molchanov and Sergiy Stakhovsky retired trailing 1–6, 0–2 in the final.

== Seeds ==
1. (Ukraine) Denys Molchanov / (Ukraine) Sergiy Stakhovsky (final, retired)
2. (India) Sriram Balaji / (Switzerland) Luca Margaroli (quarterfinals)
3. (France) Sadio Doumbia / (France) Fabien Reboul (first round)
4. (Croatia) Ivan Sabanov / (Croatia) Matej Sabanov (quarterfinals)

== Draw ==
=== Key ===
- Q = Qualifier
- WC = Wild card
- LL = Lucky loser
- Alt = Alternate
- SE = Special exempt
- PR = Protected ranking
- ITF = ITF entry
- JE = Junior exempt
- w/o = Walkover
- r = Retired
- d = Defaulted
- SR = Special ranking

First round
1	(Ukraine) D Molchanov (Ukraine) S Stakhovsky	6	6
(Slovakia) M Kližan (Czech Republic) Z Kolář	2	4
WC	(Italy) M Gigante (Italy) G Zeppieri
(Germany) P Gojowczyk (Germany) T Kamke	w/o
3	(France) S Doumbia (France) F Reboul	4	4
(Germany) D Masur (Austria) J Rodionov	6	6
(Poland) S Walków (Poland) J Zieliński	w/o
(Germany) B Hassan (United Kingdom) R Peniston
WC	(Italy) F Cobolli (Italy) L Nardi	6	3	[5]
(France) Q Halys (France) T Lamasine	4	6	[10]
(Germany) J Lenz (Germany) Y Maden	4	3
4	(Croatia) I Sabanov (Croatia) M Sabanov	6	6
WC	(Italy) Pietro Buscaglione (Italy) Lorenzo Claverie	1	2
(Germany) D Brown (Switzerland) M-A Hüsler	6	6
(Italy) A Arnaboldi (Italy) L Vanni	3	4
2	(India) S Balaji (Switzerland) L Margaroli	6	6

Quarterfinals
1	(Ukraine) D Molchanov (Ukraine) S Stakhovsky	6	1
(Germany) P Gojowczyk (Germany) T Kamke	2	0^{r}
(Germany) D Masur (Austria) J Rodionov	2	2
(Poland) S Walków (Poland) J Zieliński	6	6
(France) Q Halys (France) T Lamasine	6	6
4	(Croatia) I Sabanov (Croatia) M Sabanov	1	4
(Germany) D Brown (Switzerland) M-A Hüsler	6	7^{8}
2	(India) S Balaji (Switzerland) L Margaroli	3	6^{6}

Semifinals
1	(Ukraine) D Molchanov (Ukraine) S Stakhovsky	7^{7}	7^{7}
(Poland) S Walków (Poland) J Zieliński	6^{4}	6^{5}
(France) Q Halys (France) T Lamasine	6	3	[10]
(Germany) D Brown (Switzerland) M-A Hüsler	3	6	[5]

Final
1	(Ukraine) D Molchanov (Ukraine) S Stakhovsky	1	0^{r}
(France) Q Halys (France) T Lamasine	6	2
