= 2021 Biella Challenger Indoor – Doubles =

Doubles
- 2021 Biella Challenger Indoor

Final
- Champions: (Venezuela) Luis David Martínez (Spain) David Vega Hernández
- Runners-up: (Poland) Szymon Walków (Poland) Jan Zieliński
- Score: 6–4, 3–6, [10–8]

Events
Singles	Doubles
Biella Challenger Indoor	· 2021 →

This was the first of seven editions of the tournament in the 2021 tennis season.

Luis David Martínez and David Vega Hernández won the title after defeating Szymon Walków and Jan Zieliński 6–4, 3–6, [10–8] in the final.

== Seeds ==
1. (Switzerland) Luca Margaroli / (Belarus) Andrei Vasilevski (quarterfinals)
2. (Venezuela) Luis David Martínez / (Spain) David Vega Hernández (champions)
3. (United Kingdom) Lloyd Glasspool / (Finland) Harri Heliövaara (first round)
4. (United States) Robert Galloway / (United States) Alex Lawson (semifinals)

== Draw ==
=== Key ===
- Q = Qualifier
- WC = Wild card
- LL = Lucky loser
- Alt = Alternate
- SE = Special exempt
- PR = Protected ranking
- ITF = ITF entry
- JE = Junior exempt
- w/o = Walkover
- r = Retired
- d = Defaulted
- SR = Special ranking

First round
1	(Switzerland) L Margaroli (Belarus) A Vasilevski	7	6
(United States) T-S Kwiatkowski (Kazakhstan) D Popko	5	3
WC	(Italy) Daniele Augenti (Italy) Massimo Giunta	1	3
(Poland) S Walków (Poland) J Zieliński	6	6
4	(United States) R Galloway (United States) A Lawson	6	6
WC	(Italy) Pietro Buscaglione (Italy) G Fonio	1	2
(United States) J Cerretani (Canada) A Shamasdin	7	6
(United States) E King (United States) N Pasha	5	2
(Slovakia) L Lacko (Germany) D Masur	1	3
(Philippines) T Huey (Netherlands) S Verbeek	6	6
(Croatia) I Sabanov (Croatia) M Sabanov	6	3	[10]
3	(United Kingdom) L Glasspool (Finland) H Heliövaara	3	6	[7]
(Italy) T Fabbiano (Slovakia) M Kližan	7^{7}	6
WC	(Italy) S Napolitano (Italy) L Vanni	6^{5}	4
(Italy) F Gaio (Italy) A Pellegrino	6	4	[8]
2	(Venezuela) LD Martínez (Spain) D Vega Hernández	2	6	[10]

Quarterfinals
1	(Switzerland) L Margaroli (Belarus) A Vasilevski	2	5
(Poland) S Walków (Poland) J Zieliński	6	7
4	(United States) R Galloway (United States) A Lawson	7^{7}	5	[10]
(United States) J Cerretani (Canada) A Shamasdin	6^{3}	7	[7]
(Philippines) T Huey (Netherlands) S Verbeek	6	6
(Croatia) I Sabanov (Croatia) M Sabanov	4	4
(Italy) T Fabbiano (Slovakia) M Kližan	3	4
2	(Venezuela) LD Martínez (Spain) D Vega Hernández	6	6

Semifinals
(Poland) S Walków (Poland) J Zieliński	6	6^{5}	[10]
4	(United States) R Galloway (United States) A Lawson	4	7^{7}	[6]
(Philippines) T Huey (Netherlands) S Verbeek	5	3
2	(Venezuela) LD Martínez (Spain) D Vega Hernández	7	6

Final
(Poland) S Walków (Poland) J Zieliński	4	6	[8]
2	(Venezuela) LD Martínez (Spain) D Vega Hernández	6	3	[10]
