= 2021 Biella Challenger Indoor II – Singles =

Singles
- 2021 Biella Challenger Indoor II

Final
- Champion: (South Korea) Kwon Soon-woo
- Runner-up: (Italy) Lorenzo Musetti
- Score: 6–2, 6–3

Events
Singles	Doubles
← 2021 ·	Biella Challenger Indoor	· 2021 →

This was the second of seven editions of the tournament in the 2021 tennis season. Illya Marchenko was the defending champion but lost in the quarterfinals to Andreas Seppi.

Kwon Soon-woo won the title after defeating Lorenzo Musetti 6–2, 6–3 in the final.

== Seeds ==
1. (Spain) Alejandro Davidovich Fokina (second round)
2. (United States) Sebastian Korda (first round)
3. (South Korea) Kwon Soon-woo (champion)
4. (Italy) Andreas Seppi (semifinals)
5. (Poland) Kamil Majchrzak (second round)
6. (France) Antoine Hoang (first round)
7. (Italy) Lorenzo Musetti (final)
8. (Russia) Evgeny Donskoy (semifinals)

== Draw ==
=== Key ===
- Q = Qualifier
- WC = Wild card
- LL = Lucky loser
- Alt = Alternate
- ITF = ITF entry
- PR = Protected ranking
- SR = Special ranking
- SE = Special exempt
- JE = Junior exempt
- JR = Junior Accelerator Programme entrant
- CO = College Accelerator Programme entrant
- NG = Next Gen Accelerator Program entrant
- w/o = Walkover
- r = Retired
- d = Defaulted

=== Finals ===
Semifinals
8	(Russia) Evgeny Donskoy	3	7^{7}	1
3	(South Korea) Kwon Soon-woo	6	6^{4}	6
4	(Italy) Andreas Seppi	6	3	4
7	(Italy) Lorenzo Musetti	3	6	6

Final
3	(South Korea) Kwon Soon-woo	6	6
7	(Italy) Lorenzo Musetti	2	3

=== Top half ===
First round
1	(Spain) A Davidovich Fokina	6	6
(Canada) S Diez	3	0
(Italy) F Gaio	6	6
LL	(Japan) H Moriya	3	1
Q	(France) C Lestienne	5	7^{12}	7^{7}
WC	(Italy) L Nardi	7	6^{10}	6^{0}
(Egypt) M Safwat	3	4
8	(Russia) E Donskoy	6	6
3	(South Korea) S-w Kwon	6	6
(Chinese Taipei) J Jung	3	4
(Italy) R Marcora	7^{7}	6
(Switzerland) H Laaksonen	6^{4}	1
(Italy) A Giannessi	1	4
(Italy) T Fabbiano	6	6
(Germany) Y Maden	6	6
6	(France) A Hoang	0	2

Second round
1	(Spain) A Davidovich Fokina	6^{2}	4
(Italy) F Gaio	7^{7}	6
Q	(France) C Lestienne	4	2
8	(Russia) E Donskoy	6	6
3	(South Korea) S-w Kwon	6	6
(Italy) R Marcora	2	2
(Italy) T Fabbiano	6^{3}	1
(Germany) Y Maden	7^{7}	6

Quarterfinals
(Italy) F Gaio	3	2
8	(Russia) E Donskoy	6	6
3	(South Korea) S-w Kwon	6	6
(Germany) Y Maden	2	1

Semifinals
8	(Russia) E Donskoy	3	7^{7}	1
3	(South Korea) S-w Kwon	6	6^{4}	6

=== Bottom half ===
First round
5	(Poland) K Majchrzak	7^{7}	6
(Slovenia) B Rola	6^{5}	4
SE	(Ukraine) I Marchenko	7^{7}	4	6
WC	(Italy) G Zeppieri	6^{1}	6	3
(Spain) B Zapata Miralles	6^{5}	4
(Slovakia) M Kližan	7^{7}	6
Q	(Italy) M Viola	2	6	5
4	(Italy) A Seppi	6	4	7
7	(Italy) L Musetti	7	6
WC	(Italy) S Napolitano	5	3
Q	(Slovenia) B Kavčič	3	2
Alt	(Slovakia) L Lacko	6	6
Q	(Italy) R Brancaccio	6	3	4
Alt	(Latvia) E Gulbis	4	6	6
(Kazakhstan) D Popko	6	6
2	(United States) S Korda	4	3

Second round
5	(Poland) K Majchrzak	6	4	1
SE	(Ukraine) I Marchenko	1	6	6
(Slovakia) M Kližan	6^{8}	3
4	(Italy) A Seppi	7^{10}	6
7	(Italy) L Musetti	6	6
Alt	(Slovakia) L Lacko	4	3
Alt	(Latvia) E Gulbis	6	6
(Kazakhstan) D Popko	1	4

Quarterfinals
SE	(Ukraine) I Marchenko	4	5
4	(Italy) A Seppi	6	7
7	(Italy) L Musetti	6	6
Alt	(Latvia) E Gulbis	2	4

Semifinals
4	(Italy) A Seppi	6	3	4
7	(Italy) L Musetti	3	6	6
