= 2021 Biella Challenger Indoor IV – Singles =

Singles
- 2021 Biella Challenger Indoor IV

Final
- Champion: (Germany) Daniel Masur
- Runner-up: (Germany) Matthias Bachinger
- Score: 6–3, 6–7^{(8–10)}, 7–5

Events
| Singles | Doubles |
| ← 2021 · | Biella Challenger Indoor | · 2022 → |

Andreas Seppi was the defending champion but lost in the second round to Matthias Bachinger.

Daniel Masur won the title after defeating Bachinger 6–3, 6–7^{(8–10)}, 7–5 in the final.

== Seeds ==
1. (France) Lucas Pouille (second round)
2. (Germany) Yannick Hanfmann (first round)
3. (Italy) Andreas Seppi (second round)
4. (Japan) Yūichi Sugita (first round)
5. (Japan) Yasutaka Uchiyama (first round)
6. (Belarus) Ilya Ivashka (first round)
7. (France) Grégoire Barrère (quarterfinals)
8. (France) Benjamin Bonzi (semifinals)

== Draw ==
Key

- Q = Qualifier
- WC = Wild card
- LL = Lucky loser
- Alt = Alternate
- ITF = ITF entry
- PR = Protected ranking
- SR = Special ranking
- SE = Special exempt
- JE = Junior exempt
- JR = Junior Accelerator Programme entrant
- CO = College Accelerator Programme entrant
- NG = Next Gen Accelerator Program entrant
- w/o = Walkover
- r = Retired
- d = Defaulted

=== Finals ===
Semifinals
(Ukraine) Illya Marchenko | 3 | 3
Q | (Germany) Daniel Masur | 6 | 6
Q | (Germany) Matthias Bachinger | 7 | 6
8 | (France) Benjamin Bonzi | 5 | 4

Final
Q | (Germany) Daniel Masur | 6 | 6^{8} | 7
Q | (Germany) Matthias Bachinger | 3 | 7^{10} | 5

=== Top half ===
First round
1 | (France) L Pouille | 6 | 7^{8}
Alt | (France) Q Halys | 2 | 6^{6}
(Ukraine) I Marchenko | 6 | 7
WC | (Italy) F Cobolli | 3 | 5
WC | (Italy) S Napolitano | 6^{5} | 6 | 4
Alt | (Czech Republic) Z Kolář | 7^{7} | 0 | 6
(Australia) A Vukic | 5 | 6^{5}
7 | (France) G Barrère | 7 | 7^{7}
4 | (Japan) Y Sugita | 6^{4} | 7^{7} | 3
Q | (Germany) D Masur | 7^{7} | 6^{3} | 6
Q | (Czech Republic) J Forejtek | 6 | 6^{2} | 6
PR | (Germany) D Brown | 3 | 7^{7} | 4
(Ukraine) S Stakhovsky | 7 | 5 | 6
WC | (Italy) M Gigante | 5 | 7 | 2
(Switzerland) M-A Hüsler | 6 | 7^{7}
5 | (Japan) Y Uchiyama | 2 | 6^{3}

Second round
1 | (France) L Pouille | 4 | 3
(Ukraine) I Marchenko | 6 | 6
Alt | (Czech Republic) Z Kolář | 2 | 4
7 | (France) G Barrère | 6 | 6
Q | (Germany) D Masur | 7 | 6^{4} | 6
Q | (Czech Republic) J Forejtek | 5 | 7^{7} | 4
(Ukraine) S Stakhovsky | 7 | 3 | 7^{7}
(Switzerland) M-A Hüsler | 5 | 6 | 6^{5}

Quarterfinals
(Ukraine) I Marchenko | 7^{10} | 6
7 | (France) G Barrère | 6^{8} | 1
Q | (Germany) D Masur | 7^{7} | 6
(Ukraine) S Stakhovsky | 6^{3} | 4

Semifinals
(Ukraine) I Marchenko | 3 | 3
Q | (Germany) D Masur | 6 | 6

=== Bottom half ===
First round
6 | (Belarus) I Ivashka | 3 | 7 | 4
(Germany) Y Maden | 6 | 5 | 6
(Austria) S Ofner | 6 | 6
LL | (Spain) N Kuhn | 2 | 2
Q | (Germany) M Bachinger | 7^{7} | 2 | 6
Q | (Australia) A Santillan | 6^{4} | 6 | 4
LL | (United States) J Sock | 6 | 3 | 3
3 | (Italy) A Seppi | 4 | 6 | 6
8 | (France) B Bonzi | 6^{5} | 6 | 6
(Austria) J Rodionov | 7^{7} | 4 | 4
Alt | (Germany) T Kamke | 6 | 6
(Sweden) E Ymer | 2 | 2
(Australia) B Tomic | 7^{7} | 6
(Italy) R Marcora | 6^{5} | 1
(France) M Bourgue | 7 | 4 | 6
2 | (Germany) Y Hanfmann | 5 | 6 | 3

Second round
(Germany) Y Maden | 3 | 4
(Austria) S Ofner | 6 | 6
Q | (Germany) M Bachinger | 6 | 7
3 | (Italy) A Seppi | 3 | 5
8 | (France) B Bonzi | 7^{7} | 7^{7}
Alt | (Germany) T Kamke | 6^{2} | 6^{3}
(Australia) B Tomic | 3 | 2
(France) M Bourgue | 6 | 6

Quarterfinals
(Austria) S Ofner | 6^{5} | 0^{r}
Q | (Germany) M Bachinger | 7^{7} | 1
8 | (France) B Bonzi | 6 | 7^{7}
(France) M Bourgue | 3 | 6^{4}

Semifinals
Q | (Germany) M Bachinger | 7 | 6
8 | (France) B Bonzi | 5 | 4
