= 2021 Biella Challenger Indoor II – Doubles =

Doubles
- 2021 Biella Challenger Indoor II

Final
- Champions: (Monaco) Hugo Nys (Germany) Tim Pütz
- Runners-up: (United Kingdom) Lloyd Glasspool (Finland) Harri Heliövaara
- Score: 7–6^{(7–4)}, 6–3

Events
Singles	Doubles
← 2021 ·	Biella Challenger Indoor	· 2021 →

This was the second of seven editions of the tournament in the 2021 tennis season. Luis David Martínez and David Vega Hernández were the defending champions but lost in the quarterfinals to Nathaniel Lammons and Jackson Withrow.

Hugo Nys and Tim Pütz won the title after defeating Lloyd Glasspool and Harri Heliövaara 7–6^{(7–4)}, 6–3 in the final.

== Seeds ==
1. (Monaco) Hugo Nys / (Germany) Tim Pütz (champions)
2. (Israel) Jonathan Erlich / (Belarus) Andrei Vasilevski (first round)
3. (Sweden) André Göransson / (Netherlands) David Pel (first round)
4. (United States) Nathaniel Lammons / (United States) Jackson Withrow (semifinals)

== Draw ==
=== Key ===
- Q = Qualifier
- WC = Wild card
- LL = Lucky loser
- Alt = Alternate
- SE = Special exempt
- PR = Protected ranking
- ITF = ITF entry
- JE = Junior exempt
- w/o = Walkover
- r = Retired
- d = Defaulted
- SR = Special ranking

First round
1	(Monaco) H Nys (Germany) T Pütz	3	6	[10]
(United States) E King (United States) H Reese	6	4	[5]
(Monaco) R Arneodo (France) A Olivetti	6	6^{3}	[10]
(Ukraine) D Molchanov (Kazakhstan) A Nedovyesov	3	7^{7}	[6]
3	(Sweden) A Göransson (Netherlands) D Pel	5	4
(Philippines) T Huey (Netherlands) S Verbeek	7	6
WC	(Italy) T Fabbiano (Italy) M Gigante	3	6	[10]
WC	(Italy) L Nardi (Italy) G Zeppieri	6	3	[12]
(Venezuela) LD Martínez (Spain) D Vega Hernández	6^{7}	7	[10]
WC	(Italy) S Napolitano (Italy) L Vanni	7^{9}	5	[7]
(Poland) K Majchrzak (United States) N Pasha	4	4
4	(United States) N Lammons (United States) J Withrow	6	6
(United States) R Galloway (United States) A Lawson	7^{7}	3	[8]
(United Kingdom) L Glasspool (Finland) H Heliövaara	6^{2}	6	[10]
(Spain) A Davidovich Fokina (Spain) B Zapata Miralles	6	7
2	(Israel) J Erlich (Belarus) A Vasilevski	4	5

Quarterfinals
1	(Monaco) H Nys (Germany) T Pütz	6	6
(Monaco) R Arneodo (France) A Olivetti	2	4
(Philippines) T Huey (Netherlands) S Verbeek	6	6
WC	(Italy) L Nardi (Italy) G Zeppieri	4	3
(Venezuela) LD Martínez (Spain) D Vega Hernández	5	4
4	(United States) N Lammons (United States) J Withrow	7	6
(United Kingdom) L Glasspool (Finland) H Heliövaara	6	6
(Spain) A Davidovich Fokina (Spain) B Zapata Miralles	3	4

Semifinals
1	(Monaco) H Nys (Germany) T Pütz	w/o
(Philippines) T Huey (Netherlands) S Verbeek
4	(United States) N Lammons (United States) J Withrow	6^{4}	6^{6}
(United Kingdom) L Glasspool (Finland) H Heliövaara	7^{7}	7^{8}

Final
1	(Monaco) H Nys (Germany) T Pütz	7^{7}	6
(United Kingdom) L Glasspool (Finland) H Heliövaara	6^{4}	3
