= 2021 Biella Challenger Indoor – Singles =

Singles
- 2021 Biella Challenger Indoor

Final
- Champion: (Ukraine) Illya Marchenko
- Runner-up: (United Kingdom) Andy Murray
- Score: 6–2, 6–4

Events
Singles	Doubles
Biella Challenger Indoor	· 2021 →

This was the first of seven editions of the tournament in the 2021 tennis season.

Unseeded Illya Marchenko won the title after defeating the top seed Andy Murray 6–2, 6–4 in the final.

== Seeds ==
1. (United Kingdom) Andy Murray (final)
2. (Italy) Federico Gaio (semifinals)
3. (Egypt) Mohamed Safwat (second round)
4. (Italy) Lorenzo Giustino (quarterfinals)
5. (Slovakia) Martin Kližan (first round)
6. (Slovenia) Blaž Rola (quarterfinals)
7. (Slovakia) Filip Horanský (second round)
8. (Kazakhstan) Dmitry Popko (second round)

== Draw ==
=== Key ===
- Q = Qualifier
- WC = Wild card
- LL = Lucky loser
- Alt = Alternate
- ITF = ITF entry
- PR = Protected ranking
- SR = Special ranking
- SE = Special exempt
- JE = Junior exempt
- JR = Junior Accelerator Programme entrant
- CO = College Accelerator Programme entrant
- NG = Next Gen Accelerator Program entrant
- w/o = Walkover
- r = Retired
- d = Defaulted

=== Finals ===
Semifinals
1/WC	(United Kingdom) Andy Murray	6	7
(France) Mathias Bourgue	0	5
(Ukraine) Illya Marchenko	7	6
2	(Italy) Federico Gaio	5	1

Final
1/WC	(United Kingdom) Andy Murray	2	4
(Ukraine) Illya Marchenko	6	6

=== Top half ===
First round
1/WC	(United Kingdom) A Murray	6^{3}	6	6
(Germany) M Marterer	7^{7}	2	3
(Russia) E Karlovskiy	6^{4}	4
(Italy) GM Moroni	7^{7}	6
(Slovenia) B Kavčič	3	6	5
(Italy) M Viola	6	3	7
(United States) T-S Kwiatkowski	3	2
6	(Slovenia) B Rola	6	6
3	(Egypt) M Safwat	4	6	6
(Japan) H Moriya	6	3	2
WC	(Bulgaria) A Andreev	2	5
(Germany) M Bachinger	6	7
(France) M Bourgue	7^{7}	6
(Italy) A Pellegrino	6^{4}	1
Q	(Italy) Fabrizio Ornago	2	2
7	(Slovakia) F Horanský	6	6

Second round
1/WC	(United Kingdom) A Murray	6	6
(Italy) GM Moroni	4	4
(Italy) M Viola	6	5	4
6	(Slovenia) B Rola	3	7	6
3	(Egypt) M Safwat	6	2	3
(Germany) M Bachinger	4	6	6
(France) M Bourgue	6	7
7	(Slovakia) F Horanský	3	5

Quarterfinals
1/WC	(United Kingdom) A Murray	6	7^{11}
6	(Slovenia) B Rola	4	6^{9}
(Germany) M Bachinger	1	7^{7}	1
(France) M Bourgue	6	6^{3}	6

Semifinals
1/WC	(United Kingdom) A Murray	6	7
(France) M Bourgue	0	5

=== Bottom half ===
First round
5	(Slovakia) M Kližan	2	6^{7}
(Ukraine) I Marchenko	6	7^{9}
(Italy) T Fabbiano	1	4
WC	(Italy) L Vanni	6	6
(Germany) T Kamke	3	5
(Italy) R Marcora	6	7
Q	(Netherlands) J Sels	4	3
4	(Italy) L Giustino	6	6
8	(Kazakhstan) D Popko	6	6
(Tunisia) M Jaziri	1	3
(Germany) D Masur	6	7
(Italy) S Napolitano	3	5
Q	(Netherlands) T van Rijthoven	6	3	6
Q	(Italy) G Fonio	4	6	3
(Slovakia) L Lacko	3	4
2	(Italy) F Gaio	6	6

Second round
(Ukraine) I Marchenko	7^{10}	6
WC	(Italy) L Vanni	6^{8}	1
(Italy) R Marcora	6^{3}	5
4	(Italy) L Giustino	7^{7}	7
8	(Kazakhstan) D Popko	6	2	3
(Germany) D Masur	4	6	6
Q	(Netherlands) T van Rijthoven	4	4
2	(Italy) F Gaio	6	6

Quarterfinals
(Ukraine) I Marchenko	6	2	7
4	(Italy) L Giustino	2	6	5
(Germany) D Masur	3	3
2	(Italy) F Gaio	6	6

Semifinals
(Ukraine) I Marchenko	7	6
2	(Italy) F Gaio	5	1
