= 2021 Biella Challenger Indoor IV =

- Date: 15–21 March
- Edition: 4th
- Draw: 32S / 16D
- Surface: Hard (indoor)
- Location: Biella, Italy

Champions

Singles
- (Germany) Daniel Masur

Doubles
- (United Kingdom) Lloyd Glasspool / (Australia) Matt Reid
- Biella Challenger Indoor

The 2021 Biella Challenger Indoor IV was a professional tennis tournament played on hard courts. It was the 4th edition of the tournament which was part of the 2021 ATP Challenger Tour. It took place in Biella, Italy between 15 and 21 March 2021.

== Singles main-draw entrants ==
=== Seeds ===
Country	Player	Rank^{1}	Seed
FRA	Lucas Pouille	81	1
GER	Yannick Hanfmann	105	2
ITA	Andreas Seppi	107	3
JPN	Yūichi Sugita	108	4
JPN	Yasutaka Uchiyama	109	5
BLR	Ilya Ivashka	113	6
FRA	Grégoire Barrère	115	7
FRA	Benjamin Bonzi	127	8

- ^{1} Rankings are as of 8 March 2021.

=== Other entrants ===
The following players received wildcards into the singles main draw:

- (Italy) Flavio Cobolli
- (Italy) Matteo Gigante
- (Italy) Stefano Napolitano

The following player received entry into the singles main draw using a protected ranking:

- (Germany) Dustin Brown

The following players received entry into the singles main draw as alternates:

- (France) Quentin Halys
- (Germany) Tobias Kamke
- (Czech Republic) Zdeněk Kolář

The following players received entry from the qualifying draw:

- (Germany) Matthias Bachinger
- (Czech Republic) Jonáš Forejtek
- (Germany) Daniel Masur
- (Australia) Akira Santillan

The following players received entry as lucky losers:

- (Spain) Nicola Kuhn
- (United States) Jack Sock

== Champions ==
=== Singles ===
- (Germany) Daniel Masur def. (Germany) Matthias Bachinger 6–3, 6–7^{(8–10)}, 7–5.

=== Doubles ===
- (United Kingdom) Lloyd Glasspool / (Australia) Matt Reid def. (Ukraine) Denys Molchanov / (Ukraine) Sergiy Stakhovsky 6–3, 6–4.
