= 2021 Biella Challenger Indoor II =

- Date: 15–21 February
- Edition: 2nd
- Draw: 32S / 16D
- Surface: Hard (indoor)
- Location: Biella, Italy

Champions

Singles
- (South Korea) Kwon Soon-woo

Doubles
- (Monaco) Hugo Nys / (Germany) Tim Pütz
- Biella Challenger Indoor

The 2021 Biella Challenger Indoor II was a professional tennis tournament played on hard courts. It was the 2nd edition of the tournament which was part of the 2021 ATP Challenger Tour. It took place in Biella, Italy between 15 and 21 February 2021.

== Singles main-draw entrants ==
=== Seeds ===
Country	Player	Rank^{1}	Seed
ESP	Alejandro Davidovich Fokina	54	1
USA	Sebastian Korda	88	2
KOR	Kwon Soon-woo	97	3
ITA	Andreas Seppi	108	4
POL	Kamil Majchrzak	109	5
FRA	Antoine Hoang	119	6
ITA	Lorenzo Musetti	122	7
RUS	Evgeny Donskoy	123	8

- ^{1} Rankings are as of 8 February 2021.

=== Other entrants ===
The following players received wildcards into the singles main draw:

- (Italy) Stefano Napolitano
- (Italy) Luca Nardi
- (Italy) Giulio Zeppieri

The following player received entry into the singles main draw as a special exempt:

- (Ukraine) Illya Marchenko

The following players received entry into the singles main draw as alternates:

- (Latvia) Ernests Gulbis
- (Slovakia) Lukáš Lacko

The following players received entry from the qualifying draw:

- (Italy) Raúl Brancaccio
- (Slovenia) Blaž Kavčič
- (France) Constant Lestienne
- (Italy) Matteo Viola

The following player received entry as a lucky loser:

- (Japan) Hiroki Moriya

== Champions ==
=== Singles ===
- (South Korea) Kwon Soon-woo def. (Italy) Lorenzo Musetti 6–2, 6–3.

=== Doubles ===
- (Monaco) Hugo Nys / (Germany) Tim Pütz def. (United Kingdom) Lloyd Glasspool / (Finland) Harri Heliövaara 7–6^{(7–4)}, 6–3.
