= 2021 Biella Challenger Indoor IV – Doubles =

Doubles
- 2021 Biella Challenger Indoor IV

Final
- Champions: (United Kingdom) Lloyd Glasspool (Australia) Matt Reid
- Runners-up: (Ukraine) Denys Molchanov (Ukraine) Sergiy Stakhovsky
- Score: 6–3, 6–4

Events
Singles	Doubles
← 2021 ·	Biella Challenger Indoor	· 2022 →

Quentin Halys and Tristan Lamasine were the defending champions but only Halys chose to defend his title, partnering Lucas Pouille. Halys lost in the quarterfinals to Purav Raja and Tristan-Samuel Weissborn.

Lloyd Glasspool and Matt Reid won the title after defeating Denys Molchanov and Sergiy Stakhovsky 6–3, 6–4 in the final.

== Seeds ==
1. (Kazakhstan) Andrey Golubev / (Czech Republic) Zdeněk Kolář (first round)
2. (Mexico) Miguel Ángel Reyes-Varela / (Brazil) Fernando Romboli (first round)
3. (France) Benjamin Bonzi / (Monaco) Hugo Nys (semifinals)
4. (United Kingdom) Lloyd Glasspool / (Australia) Matt Reid (champions)

== Draw ==
=== Key ===
- Q = Qualifier
- WC = Wild card
- LL = Lucky loser
- Alt = Alternate
- SE = Special exempt
- PR = Protected ranking
- ITF = ITF entry
- JE = Junior exempt
- w/o = Walkover
- r = Retired
- d = Defaulted
- SR = Special ranking

First round
1	(Kazakhstan) A Golubev (Czech Republic) Z Kolář	3	6	[8]
(France) G Barrère (France) A Olivetti	6	4	[10]
(France) S Doumbia (France) F Reboul	5	6	[7]
(Ukraine) D Molchanov (Ukraine) S Stakhovsky	7	3	[10]
WC	(Spain) D Marrero (Spain) A Menéndez Maceiras	7^{12}	6^{3}	[10]
(United States) N Pasha (United States) M Schnur	6^{10}	7^{7}	[8]
(India) S Balaji (Switzerland) L Margaroli	6	6
WC	(Italy) Lorenzo Claverie (Italy) M Gigante	1	3
Alt	(Australia) A Santillan (Australia) B Tomic	2	7	[3]
(India) P Raja (Austria) T-S Weissborn	6	5	[10]
(France) Q Halys (France) L Pouille	7^{9}	6
2	(Mexico) MÁ Reyes-Varela (Brazil) F Romboli	6^{7}	4

Quarterfinals
(France) G Barrère (France) A Olivetti	7^{7}	2	[5]
(Ukraine) D Molchanov (Ukraine) S Stakhovsky	6^{1}	6	[10]
3	(France) B Bonzi (Monaco) H Nys	6	6
WC	(Spain) D Marrero (Spain) A Menéndez Maceiras	4	2
(India) S Balaji (Switzerland) L Margaroli	4	2
4	(United Kingdom) L Glasspool (Australia) M Reid	6	6
(India) P Raja (Austria) T-S Weissborn	6	4	[10]
(France) Q Halys (France) L Pouille	4	6	[7]

Semifinals
(Ukraine) D Molchanov (Ukraine) S Stakhovsky	6	6
3	(France) B Bonzi (Monaco) H Nys	4	4
4	(United Kingdom) L Glasspool (Australia) M Reid	4	6	[10]
(India) P Raja (Austria) T-S Weissborn	6	4	[7]

Final
(Ukraine) D Molchanov (Ukraine) S Stakhovsky	3	4
4	(United Kingdom) L Glasspool (Australia) M Reid	6	6
