= 2021 Biella Challenger Indoor =

- Date: 8–14 February
- Edition: 1st
- Draw: 32S / 16D
- Surface: Hard (Indoor)
- Location: Biella, Italy

Champions

Singles
- (Ukraine) Illya Marchenko

Doubles
- (Venezuela) Luis David Martínez / (Spain) David Vega Hernández
- Biella Challenger Indoor

The 2021 Biella Challenger Indoor was a professional tennis tournament played on hard courts. It was the 1st edition of the tournament which was part of the 2021 ATP Challenger Tour. It took place in Biella, Italy between 8 and 14 February 2021.

== Singles main-draw entrants ==
=== Seeds ===
Country	Player	Rank^{1}	Seed
GBR	Andy Murray	124	1
ITA	Federico Gaio	138	2
EGY	Mohamed Safwat	147	3
ITA	Lorenzo Giustino	154	4
SVK	Martin Kližan	156	5
SLO	Blaž Rola	158	6
SVK	Filip Horanský	163	7
KAZ	Dmitry Popko	168	8

- ^{1} Rankings are as of 1 February 2021.

=== Other entrants ===
The following players received wildcards into the singles main draw:

- (Bulgaria) Adrian Andreev
- (United Kingdom) Andy Murray
- (Italy) Luca Vanni

The following players received entry from the qualifying draw:

- (Italy) Giovanni Fonio
- (Italy) Fabrizio Ornago
- (Netherlands) Jelle Sels
- (Netherlands) Tim van Rijthoven

== Champions ==
=== Singles ===
- (Ukraine) Illya Marchenko def. (United Kingdom) Andy Murray 6–2, 6–4.

=== Doubles ===
- (Venezuela) Luis David Martínez / (Spain) David Vega Hernández def. (Poland) Szymon Walków / (Poland) Jan Zieliński 6–4, 3–6, [10–8].
