= 2022 ATP Finals – Doubles =

2022 tennis tournament

Doubles
- 2022 ATP Finals

Final
- Champions: (United States) Rajeev Ram (United Kingdom) Joe Salisbury
- Runners-up: (Croatia) Nikola Mektić (Croatia) Mate Pavić
- Score: 7–6^{(7–4)}, 6–4

Details
- Draw: 8 (round robin)

Events
Singles	Doubles
← 2021 ·	ATP Finals	· 2023 →

Rajeev Ram and Joe Salisbury defeated Nikola Mektić and Mate Pavić in the final, 7–6^{(7–4)}, 6–4 to win the doubles tennis title at the 2022 ATP Finals. It was their first ATP Finals title. Salisbury became the first Briton to win an ATP Finals doubles title. By staying undefeated, the champions also claimed $930,300, the biggest doubles payout in history at the time.

Pierre-Hugues Herbert and Nicolas Mahut were the reigning champions, but did not qualify this year.

Wesley Koolhof and Neal Skupski jointly secured the year-end individual doubles No. 1 ranking after winning their first round robin match. Ram was also in contention for the year-end top ranking at the beginning of the tournament.

== Seeds ==
1. (Netherlands) Wesley Koolhof / (United Kingdom) Neal Skupski (semifinals)
2. (United States) Rajeev Ram / (United Kingdom) Joe Salisbury (champions)
3. (El Salvador) Marcelo Arévalo / (Netherlands) Jean-Julien Rojer (round robin)
4. (Croatia) Nikola Mektić / (Croatia) Mate Pavić (final)
5. (Croatia) Ivan Dodig / (United States) Austin Krajicek (round robin)
6. (United Kingdom) Lloyd Glasspool / (Finland) Harri Heliövaara (semifinals)
7. (Spain) Marcel Granollers / (Argentina) Horacio Zeballos (round robin)
8. (Australia) Thanasi Kokkinakis / (Australia) Nick Kyrgios (round robin)

== Alternates ==
1. (Australia) Matthew Ebden / (Australia) Max Purcell (did not play)
2. (Germany) Tim Pütz / (New Zealand) Michael Venus (did not play)

== Draw ==
=== Finals ===
Semifinals
4	(Croatia) Nikola Mektić (Croatia) Mate Pavić	6	6^{4}	[10]
6	(United Kingdom) Lloyd Glasspool (Finland) Harri Heliövaara	4	7^{7}	[6]
2	(United States) Rajeev Ram (United Kingdom) Joe Salisbury	7^{9}	6
1	(Netherlands) Wesley Koolhof (United Kingdom) Neal Skupski	6^{7}	4

Final
4	(Croatia) Nikola Mektić (Croatia) Mate Pavić	6^{4}	4
2	(United States) Rajeev Ram (United Kingdom) Joe Salisbury	7^{7}	6

=== Green group ===
		(Netherlands) Koolhof (United Kingdom) Skupski	(Croatia) Mektić (Croatia) Pavić	(Croatia) Dodig (United States) Krajicek	(Australia) Kokkinakis (Australia) Kyrgios	RR W–L	Set W–L	Game W–L	Standings
1	(Netherlands) Wesley Koolhof (United Kingdom) Neal Skupski		4–6, 6–7^{(3–7)}	7–5, 4–6, [10–6]	6–7^{(3–7)}, 6–4, [10–5]	2–1	4–4 (50%)	35–35 (50%)	2
4	(Croatia) Nikola Mektić (Croatia) Mate Pavić	6–4, 7–6^{(7–3)}		6–4, 3–6, [10–7]	7–6^{(7–4)}, 7–6^{(7–4)}	3–0	6–1 (86%)	37–32 (54%)	1
5	(Croatia) Ivan Dodig (United States) Austin Krajicek	5–7, 6–4, [6–10]	4–6, 6–3, [7–10]		6–3, 4–6, [6–10]	0–3	3–6 (33%)	31–32 (49%)	4
8	(Australia) Thanasi Kokkinakis (Australia) Nick Kyrgios	7–6^{(7–3)}, 4–6, [5–10]	6–7^{(4–7)}, 6–7^{(4–7)}	3–6, 6–4, [10–6]		1–2	3–5 (38%)	33–37 (47%)	3

=== Red group ===
		(United States) Ram (United Kingdom) Salisbury	(El Salvador) Arévalo (Netherlands) Rojer	(United Kingdom) Glasspool (Finland) Heliövaara	(Spain) Granollers (Argentina) Zeballos	RR W–L	Set W–L	Game W–L	Standings
2	(United States) Rajeev Ram (United Kingdom) Joe Salisbury		3–6, 7–6^{(7–4)}, [10–5]	7–5, 6–4	6–3, 6–7^{(8–10)}, [10–8]	3–0	6–2 (75%)	37–31 (54%)	1
3	(El Salvador) Marcelo Arévalo (Netherlands) Jean-Julien Rojer	6–3, 6–7^{(4–7)}, [5–10]		5–7, 6–7^{(3–7)}	6–1, 6–7^{(3–7)}, [10–7]	1–2	3–5 (38%)	36–33 (52%)	3
6	(United Kingdom) Lloyd Glasspool (Finland) Harri Heliövaara	5–7, 4–6	7–5, 7–6^{(7–3)}		6–0, 6–4	2–1	4–2 (67%)	35–28 (56%)	2
7	(Spain) Marcel Granollers (Argentina) Horacio Zeballos	3–6, 7–6^{(10–8)}, [8–10]	1–6, 7–6^{(7–3)}, [7–10]	0–6, 4–6		0–3	2–6 (25%)	22–38 (37%)	4

Standings are determined by: 1. number of wins; 2. number of matches; 3. in two-teams-ties, head-to-head records; 4. in three-teams-ties, percentage of sets won, then percentage of games won; 5. ATP rankings.
