= 2026 Monte-Carlo Masters – Doubles =

Doubles
- 2026 Monte-Carlo Masters

Final
- Champions: (Germany) Kevin Krawietz (Germany) Tim Pütz
- Runners-up: (El Salvador) Marcelo Arévalo (Croatia) Mate Pavić
- Score: 4–6, 6–2, [10–8]

Details
- Draw: 28
- Seeds: 8

Events
Singles	Doubles
- Monte-Carlo Masters

Kevin Krawietz and Tim Pütz defeated Marcelo Arévalo and Mate Pavić in the final, 4–6, 6–2, [10–8] to win the doubles tennis title at the 2026 Monte-Carlo Masters. It was the second ATP Masters 1000 title for Krawietz and third for Pütz.

Romain Arneodo and Manuel Guinard were the reigning champions, but chose not to compete together. Arneodo partnered Pierre-Hugues Herbert, but lost in the second round to Hugo Nys and Édouard Roger-Vasselin. Guinard partnered Guido Andreozzi, but lost in the semifinals to Arévalo and Pavić.

Neal Skupski retained the ATP No. 1 doubles ranking after Horacio Zeballos lost in the quarterfinals.

== Seeds ==
The top four seeds received a bye into the second round.

1. (Spain) Marcel Granollers / (Argentina) Horacio Zeballos (quarterfinals)
2. (United Kingdom) Julian Cash / (United Kingdom) Lloyd Glasspool (quarterfinals)
3. (Finland) Harri Heliövaara / (United Kingdom) Henry Patten (quarterfinals)
4. (United States) Christian Harrison / (United Kingdom) Neal Skupski (quarterfinals)
5. (El Salvador) Marcelo Arévalo / (Croatia) Mate Pavić (final)
6. (Germany) Kevin Krawietz / (Germany) Tim Pütz (champions)
7. (Portugal) Francisco Cabral / (United Kingdom) Joe Salisbury (first round)
8. (Argentina) Guido Andreozzi / (France) Manuel Guinard (semifinals)

== Draw ==
Key

- Q = Qualifier
- WC = Wild card
- LL = Lucky loser
- Alt = Alternate
- ITF = ITF entry
- PR = Protected ranking
- SR = Special ranking
- SE = Special exempt
- JE = Junior exempt
- JR = Junior Accelerator Programme entrant
- CO = College Accelerator Programme entrant
- NG = Next Gen Accelerator Program entrant
- w/o = Walkover
- r = Retired
- d = Defaulted

=== Finals ===
Semifinals
8	(Argentina) Guido Andreozzi (France) Manuel Guinard	3	5
5	(El Salvador) Marcelo Arévalo (Croatia) Mate Pavić	6	7
(Monaco) Hugo Nys (France) Édouard Roger-Vasselin	6^{3}	6	[8]
6	(Germany) Kevin Krawietz (Germany) Tim Pütz	7^{7}	4	[10]

Final
5	(El Salvador) Marcelo Arévalo (Croatia) Mate Pavić	6	2	[8]
6	(Germany) Kevin Krawietz (Germany) Tim Pütz	4	6	[10]

=== Top half ===
First round
(Brazil) M Melo (Germany) A Zverev	6	6
(United Kingdom) L Johnson (Poland) J Zieliński	3	3
(Belgium) Z Bergs (Italy) J Sinner	6	7
(Czech Republic) T Macháč (Norway) C Ruud	4	5
WC	(Greece) Pa Tsitsipas (Greece) S Tsitsipas	2	4
8	(Argentina) G Andreozzi (France) M Guinard	6	6
(Czech Republic) J Lehečka (Czech Republic) J Menšík	6	6
K Khachanov; A Rublev	3	4
Alt	(United States) A Krajicek (Croatia) N Mektić	1	6	[10]
PR	(India) Y Bhambri (New Zealand) M Venus	6	3	[7]
(France) A Rinderknech (Monaco) V Vacherot	6	6^{4}	[8]
5	(El Salvador) M Arévalo (Croatia) M Pavić	3	7^{7}	[10]

Second round
1	(Spain) M Granollers (Argentina) H Zeballos	7^{7}	6
(Brazil) M Melo (Germany) A Zverev	6^{5}	1
(Belgium) Z Bergs (Italy) J Sinner
8	(Argentina) G Andreozzi (France) M Guinard	w/o
4	(United States) C Harrison (United Kingdom) N Skupski	w/o
(Czech Republic) J Lehečka (Czech Republic) J Menšík
Alt	(United States) A Krajicek (Croatia) N Mektić	4	6^{5}
5	(El Salvador) M Arévalo (Croatia) M Pavić	6	7^{7}

Quarterfinals
1	(Spain) M Granollers (Argentina) H Zeballos	4	6	[8]
8	(Argentina) G Andreozzi (France) M Guinard	6	4	[10]
4	(United States) C Harrison (United Kingdom) N Skupski	4	6	[9]
5	(El Salvador) M Arévalo (Croatia) M Pavić	6	3	[11]

Semifinals
8	(Argentina) G Andreozzi (France) M Guinard	3	5
5	(El Salvador) M Arévalo (Croatia) M Pavić	6	7

=== Bottom half ===
First round
7	(Portugal) F Cabral (United Kingdom) J Salisbury	4	6^{2}
(Monaco) H Nys (France) É Roger-Vasselin	6	7^{7}
WC	(Monaco) R Arneodo (France) P-H Herbert	7^{8}	3	[10]
(Argentina) M González (Argentina) A Molteni	6^{6}	6	[5]
(Australia) A de Minaur (United Kingdom) C Norrie	4	6	[5]
WC	(Italy) M Berrettini (Italy) A Vavassori	6	4	[10]
6	(Germany) K Krawietz (Germany) T Pütz	6	7
(United States) R Cash (United States) JJ Tracy	3	5
(Italy) F Cobolli (Italy) L Darderi	4	4
(Sweden) A Göransson (United States) E King	6	6
(France) S Doumbia (France) F Reboul	4	5
(Austria) A Erler (Austria) L Miedler	6	7

Second round
(Monaco) H Nys (France) É Roger-Vasselin	6	6^{3}	[10]
WC	(Monaco) R Arneodo (France) P-H Herbert	4	7^{7}	[4]
WC	(Italy) M Berrettini (Italy) A Vavassori	3	6^{1}
3	(Finland) H Heliövaara (United Kingdom) H Patten	6	7^{7}
6	(Germany) K Krawietz (Germany) T Pütz	6	7
(Sweden) A Göransson (United States) E King	4	5
(Austria) A Erler (Austria) L Miedler	3	4
2	(United Kingdom) J Cash (United Kingdom) L Glasspool	6	6

Quarterfinals
(Monaco) H Nys (France) É Roger-Vasselin	6	6
3	(Finland) H Heliövaara (United Kingdom) H Patten	3	4
6	(Germany) K Krawietz (Germany) T Pütz	6	7^{7}
2	(United Kingdom) J Cash (United Kingdom) L Glasspool	4	6^{1}

Semifinals
(Monaco) H Nys (France) É Roger-Vasselin	6^{3}	6	[8]
6	(Germany) K Krawietz (Germany) T Pütz	7^{7}	4	[10]
