= 2021 Biella Challenger Indoor III =

- Date: 8–14 March 2021
- Edition: 3rd
- Draw: 32S / 16D
- Surface: Hard (indoor)
- Location: Biella, Italy

Champions

Singles
- (Italy) Andreas Seppi

Doubles
- (France) Quentin Halys / (France) Tristan Lamasine
- Biella Challenger Indoor

The 2021 Biella Challenger Indoor III was a professional tennis tournament played on hard courts. It was the 3rd edition of the tournament which was part of the 2021 ATP Challenger Tour. It took place in Biella, Italy between 8 and 14 March 2021.

== Singles main-draw entrants ==
=== Seeds ===
Country	Player	Rank^{1}	Seed
AUS	James Duckworth	102	1
ITA	Andreas Seppi	107	2
JPN	Yūichi Sugita	108	3
JPN	Yasutaka Uchiyama	109	4
GER	Peter Gojowczyk	125	5
AUT	Jurij Rodionov	139	6
SUI	Marc-Andrea Hüsler	149	7
SVK	Martin Kližan	156	8

- ^{1} Rankings are as of 1 March 2021.

=== Other entrants ===
The following players received wildcards into the singles main draw:

- (Italy) Stefano Napolitano
- (Italy) Luca Nardi
- (Italy) Giulio Zeppieri

The following player received entry into the singles main draw using a protected ranking:

- (Germany) Dustin Brown

The following players received entry from the qualifying draw:

- (Italy) Andrea Arnaboldi
- (Germany) Matthias Bachinger
- (Czech Republic) Jonáš Forejtek
- (Australia) Akira Santillan

The following player received entry as a lucky loser:

- (Germany) Julian Lenz

== Champions ==
=== Singles ===
- (Italy) Andreas Seppi def. (United Kingdom) Liam Broady 6–2, 6–1.

=== Doubles ===
- (France) Quentin Halys / (France) Tristan Lamasine def. (Ukraine) Denys Molchanov / (Ukraine) Sergiy Stakhovsky 6–1, 2–0 ret.
