= 2021 Biella Challenger Indoor III – Singles =

Singles
- 2021 Biella Challenger Indoor III

Final
- Champion: (Italy) Andreas Seppi
- Runner-up: (United Kingdom) Liam Broady
- Score: 6–2, 6–1

Events
Singles	Doubles
- Biella Challenger Indoor

Kwon Soon-woo was the defending champion but chose not to defend his title.

Andreas Seppi won the title after defeating Liam Broady 6–2, 6–1 in the final.

== Seeds ==
1. (Australia) James Duckworth (first round)
2. (Italy) Andreas Seppi (champion)
3. (Japan) Yūichi Sugita (first round)
4. (Japan) Yasutaka Uchiyama (first round)
5. (Germany) Peter Gojowczyk (quarterfinals, retired)
6. (Austria) Jurij Rodionov (quarterfinals)
7. (Switzerland) Marc-Andrea Hüsler (first round)
8. (Slovakia) Martin Kližan (first round)

== Draw ==
Key

- Q = Qualifier
- WC = Wild card
- LL = Lucky loser
- Alt = Alternate
- ITF = ITF entry
- PR = Protected ranking
- SR = Special ranking
- SE = Special exempt
- JE = Junior exempt
- JR = Junior Accelerator Programme entrant
- CO = College Accelerator Programme entrant
- NG = Next Gen Accelerator Program entrant
- w/o = Walkover
- r = Retired
- d = Defaulted

=== Finals ===
Semifinals
(Ukraine) Illya Marchenko	3	6^{2}
(United Kingdom) Liam Broady	6	7^{7}
(Netherlands) Robin Haase	1	5
2	(Italy) Andreas Seppi	6	7

Final
(United Kingdom) Liam Broady	2	1
2	(Italy) Andreas Seppi	6	6

=== Top half ===
First round
1	(Australia) J Duckworth	4	3
Q	(Italy) A Arnaboldi	6	6
(Chinese Taipei) T-l Wu	4	6^{2}
(Ukraine) I Marchenko	6	7^{7}
Q	(Czech Republic) J Forejtek	6	6
(Germany) T Kamke	3	3
Q	(Australia) A Santillan	7	3	6
7	(Switzerland) M-A Hüsler	5	6	3
3	(Japan) Y Sugita	2	2
WC	(Italy) L Nardi	6	6
(United Kingdom) L Broady	7^{7}	6
LL	(Germany) J Lenz	6^{1}	4
(Czech Republic) Z Kolář	6	7^{7}
(Germany) Y Maden	2	6^{4}
(Australia) A Vukic	4	4
6	(Austria) J Rodionov	6	6

Second round
Q	(Italy) A Arnaboldi	2	5
(Ukraine) I Marchenko	6	7
Q	(Czech Republic) J Forejtek	7^{8}	6
Q	(Australia) A Santillan	6^{6}	3
WC	(Italy) L Nardi	3	4
(United Kingdom) L Broady	6	6
(Czech Republic) Z Kolář	2	6	6^{7}
6	(Austria) J Rodionov	6	4	7^{9}

Quarterfinals
(Ukraine) I Marchenko	6	6
Q	(Czech Republic) J Forejtek	4	1
(United Kingdom) L Broady	6	6
6	(Austria) J Rodionov	4	3

Semifinals
(Ukraine) I Marchenko	3	6^{2}
(United Kingdom) L Broady	6	7^{7}

=== Bottom half ===
First round
8	(Slovakia) M Kližan	1	1
Q	(Germany) M Bachinger	6	6
(Germany) D Masur	7^{7}	3	2
(Netherlands) R Haase	6^{5}	6	6
(Canada) B Schnur	6	6
WC	(Italy) S Napolitano	2	4
(Italy) L Giustino	7	6
4	(Japan) Y Uchiyama	5	4
5	(Germany) P Gojowczyk	6^{5}	6	6
WC	(Italy) G Zeppieri	7^{7}	0	1
PR	(Germany) D Brown	1	4
(France) Q Halys	6	6
(France) H Grenier	4	2
(France) T Lamasine	6	6
(Ukraine) S Stakhovsky	2	4
2	(Italy) A Seppi	6	6

Second round
Q	(Germany) M Bachinger	2	4
(Netherlands) R Haase	6	6
(Canada) B Schnur	6	6
(Italy) L Giustino	4	2
5	(Germany) P Gojowczyk	6^{5}	6	7^{7}
(France) Q Halys	7^{7}	1	6^{4}
(France) T Lamasine	6	1	6^{4}
2	(Italy) A Seppi	1	6	7^{7}

Quarterfinals
(Netherlands) R Haase	6	6
(Canada) B Schnur	3	4
5	(Germany) P Gojowczyk	1^{r}
2	(Italy) A Seppi	3

Semifinals
(Netherlands) R Haase	1	5
2	(Italy) A Seppi	6	7
