= Tim Pütz =

German tennis player

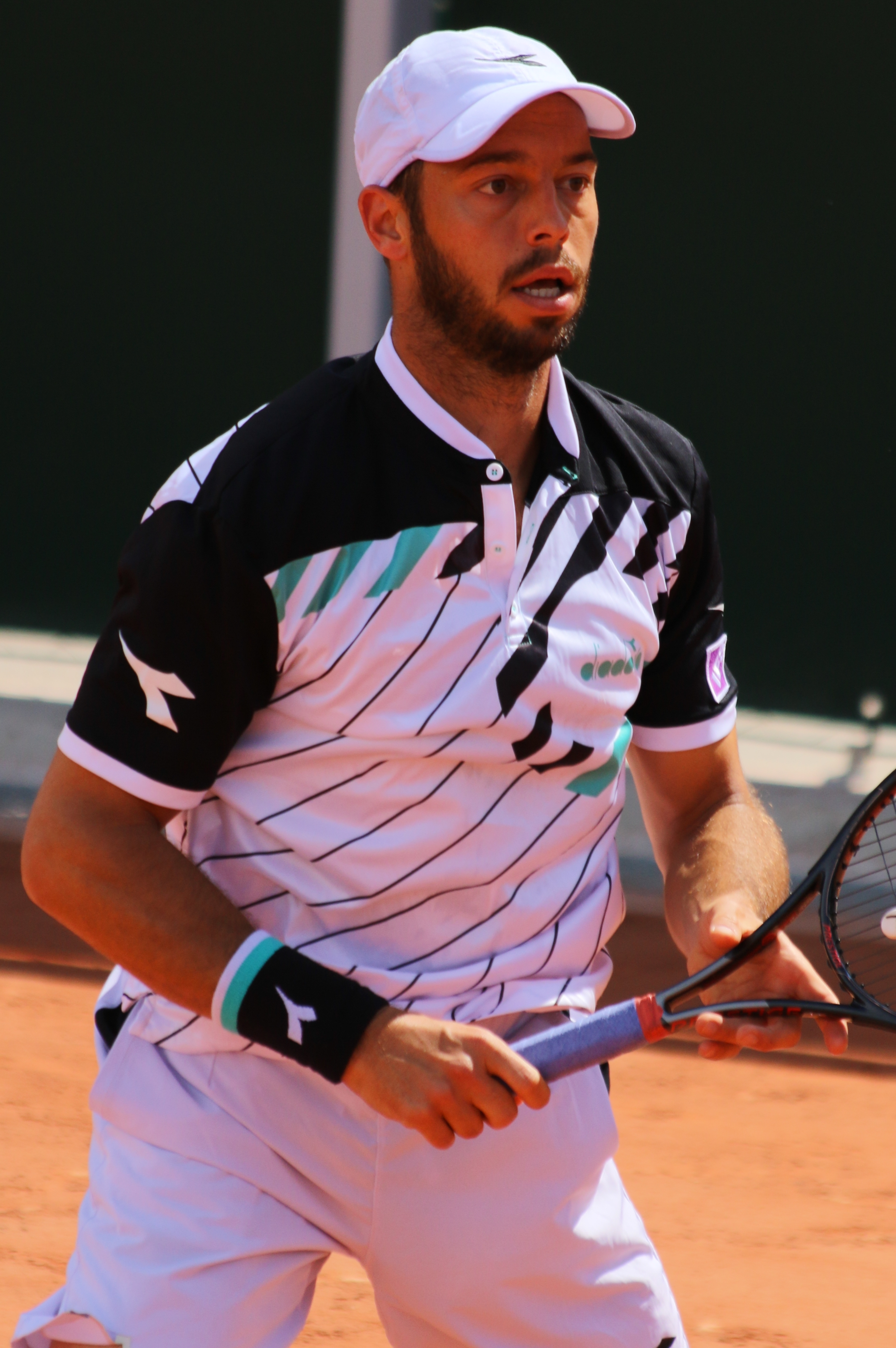
- Pütz at the 2019 French Open
- ITF name: Tim Puetz
- Country (sports): Germany
- Residence: Usingen, Germany
- Born: 19 November 1987 (age 39) Frankfurt, West Germany
- Height: 1.85 m (6 ft 1 in)
- Turned pro: 2011
- Plays: Right-handed (two-handed backhand)
- College: Auburn University
- Coach: Dominik Meffert
- Prize money: US $4,763,918

Singles
- Career record: 1–2
- Career titles: 0
- Highest ranking: No. 163 (2 February 2015)

Grand Slam singles results
- Australian Open: 1R (2015)
- French Open: Q3 (2015)
- Wimbledon: 2R (2014)
- US Open: Q1 (2013, 2014)

Doubles
- Career record: 266–144
- Career titles: 14
- Highest ranking: No. 6 (17 February 2025)
- Current ranking: No. 12 (19 October 2026)

Grand Slam doubles results
- Australian Open: SF (2025)
- French Open: QF (2020, 2021, 2023)
- Wimbledon: SF (2023, 2026)
- US Open: F (2024, 2026)

Other doubles tournaments
- Tour Finals: W (2024)
- Olympic Games: QF (2024)

Mixed doubles
- Career titles: 1

Grand Slam mixed doubles results
- Australian Open: 2R (2022, 2025, 2026)
- French Open: W (2023)
- US Open: 2R (2023)

Team competitions
- Davis Cup: SF (2021, 2024, 2025)
- Last updated on: 20 October 2026.

Tim Pütz (German pronunciation: [ˈtɪm ˈpʏts]; born 19 November 1987) is a German professional tennis player who specializes in doubles. He reached his career-high doubles ranking of world No. 6 on 17 February 2025, and has won eleven doubles titles on the ATP Tour, including the 2024 ATP Finals with Kevin Krawietz, becoming the first all-German pair to win the title. Pütz won the 2023 French Open in mixed doubles alongside Miyu Kato and was a finalist at the 2024 US Open with Krawietz.

He has also reached the semifinals at the 2023 Wimbledon. In singles, he has a career-high ranking of world No. 163, achieved in February 2015, reaching the second round at the 2014 Wimbledon Championships.

Pütz has represented Germany in the Davis Cup since 2017, most notably reaching the semifinals in 2021. He also competed at the Olympic Games with Kevin Krawietz in 2021, and in 2024 where they reached the quarterfinals.

== Professional career ==
=== 2014–2017: ATP singles & David Cup doubles debuts ===
Pütz made his ATP Tour main-draw singles debut at the 2014 Wimbledon Championships. As a qualifier, he defeated Teymuraz Gabashvili in the first round. He lost to Fabio Fognini in four sets in the next round.

Pütz played in the 2017 Davis Cup for the first time. He helped the German team to win over Portugal in the World Group play-offs by winning the doubles rubber with Jan-Lennard Struff.

=== 2018–2020: First two ATP titles and French Open quarterfinal ===
In the first round of the 2018 Davis Cup, Pütz and Struff beat the Australian duo John Peers and Matthew Ebden to set Germany on its way to victory. Although Pütz and Struff won again in the Davis Cup quarterfinals against the Spaniards Feliciano López and Marc López, their team lost the tie with 2–3.

In June 2018, Pütz won his first doubles title on the ATP Tour at the Stuttgart Open with Philipp Petzschner as a wildcard entry.

In May 2019, Pütz won his second doubles title with Frederik Nielsen at the Bavarian International Tennis Championships in Munich.

Pütz reached his first Grand Slam quarterfinal at the 2020 French Open with Nielsen, where they lost to world No. 1 and top-seeded Columbian pair of Farah/Cabal.

=== 2021: Masters title, Olympics & top 20 debuts ===
Pütz won his third doubles title at the Estoril Open with Hugo Nys.

He reached his first semifinals in doubles at a Masters 1000 at the Madrid Open with compatriot Alexander Zverev, but they withdrew from the match. Later in May, Pütz won his fourth doubles title at the Lyon Open, again with Nys.

The Pütz/Nys duo reached the quarterfinals of the French Open, where they were defeated by Kazakh duo Bublik/Golubev.

In July 2021, Pütz made his debut at the Tokyo Olympics with Kevin Krawietz.

Pütz won his fifth title and his first at an ATP 500 tournament at the Hamburg European Open with Michael Venus. He and Venus got to the semifinals of the Indian Wells Masters. He won his first ATP Masters 1000 title at the Paris Masters, again with Venus. As a result, he reached a new doubles career-high of No. 17 in November 2021.

=== 2022: Australian Open quarterfinal, Masters final, world No. 7 ===
Seeded sixth, Pütz and Venus reached the quarterfinals of the Australian Open, where they were defeated by eventual champions Thanasi Kokkinakis and Nick Kyrgios.

On 21 March, he broke into the top 10 for the first time, ranked at world No. 9. After a final showing at the Cincinnati Masters with Venus, he reached world No. 7 in the doubles rankings on 29 August 2022.

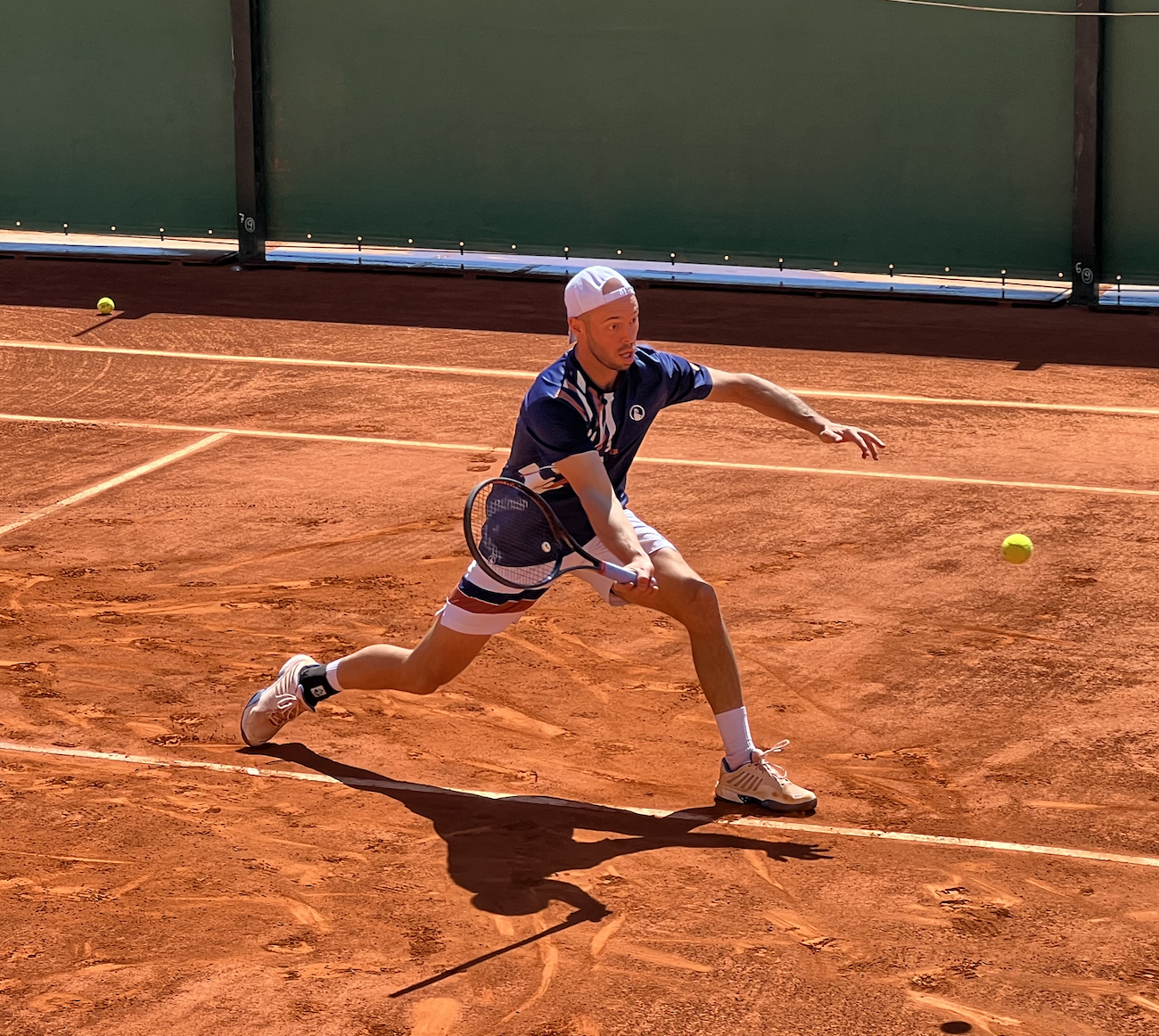
Pütz warming up ahead of his Monte-Carlo doubles quarter-final in 2023.

=== 2023: New partnership with Krawietz, French Open mixed title ===
Pütz won his first Grand Slam tournament at the French Open mixed doubles championship with Miyu Kato. At the same tournament, he reached the quarterfinals for the third time in doubles with new partner Kevin Krawietz with a win over Romain Arneodo and Sam Weissborn, getting revenge for their loss to the same duo at the 2023 Monte-Carlo Masters six weeks earlier. They lost to eventual champions Ivan Dodig and Austin Krajicek in three sets.

He reached the semifinals of a Major for the first time at the Wimbledon Championships with Krawietz. They won their first title together at the Hamburg European Open.

=== 2024: US Open finalist, Olympics quarterfinal, ATP Finals champion ===
At the Australian Open, he reached the quarterfinals for the second time at this tournament with Krawietz where they lost to eventual finalists Simone Bolelli and Andrea Vavassori. The pair also reached the semifinals at the Indian Wells Open where they lost to unseeded pair and eventual champions Wesley Koolhof/Nikola Mektić and at the Miami Open where they lost to second seeds Austin Krajicek/Ivan Dodig.

Next they reached the quarterfinals at the Monte-Carlo Masters where they lost again to the eventual champions and also unseeded pair of Joran Vliegen and Sander Gillé. In July they also won the title on home soil, at the ATP 500 in Hamburg where they were the defending champions.

Pütz partnered again Krawietz to represent Germany at the 2024 Paris Olympics where they reached the quarterfinals.

He reached his first Grand Slam final with Krawietz at the US Open defeating fifth seeds Andrea Vavassori and Simone Bolelli, 16th seeds Máximo González and Andrés Molteni and fourth seeds Marcelo Arévalo and Mate Pavić in the semifinals.

On his debut in the main competition at the ATP Finals with Krawietz, having been alternate twice before, he reached the semifinals defeating Simone Bolelli and Andrea Vavassori. They became the first all-German duo to reach the semifinals and then the final in ATP Finals history. They also became the first No. 8 seeds to reach the doubles final, which they won in straight sets against Marcelo Arévalo and Mate Pavić.

=== 2025: Masters title, world No. 6 ===
Pütz and Krawietz reached the final at the Adelaide International, losing to Simone Bolelli and Andrea Vavassori in a deciding champions tiebreak. He won his second ATP Masters 1000 title at the Shanghai Masters, again with Krawietz.

== Performance timelines ==
Key
W	F	SF	QF	#R	RR	Q#	P#	DNQ	A	Z#	PO	G	S	B	NMS	NTI	P	NH

(W) winner; (F) finalist; (SF) semifinalist; (QF) quarterfinalist; (#R) rounds 4, 3, 2, 1; (RR) round-robin stage; (Q#) qualification round; (P#) preliminary round; (DNQ) did not qualify; (A) absent; (Z#) Davis/Fed Cup Zonal Group (with number indication) or (PO) play-off; (G) gold, (S) silver or (B) bronze Olympic/Paralympic medal; (NMS) not a Masters tournament; (NTI) not a Tier I tournament; (P) postponed; (NH) not held; (SR) strike rate (events won / competed); (W–L) win–loss record.
To avoid confusion and double counting, these charts are updated at the conclusion of a tournament or when the player's participation has ended.

=== Singles ===
Tournament	2013	2014	2015	SR	W–L
Grand Slam tournaments
Australian Open	A	A	1R	0 / 1	0–1
French Open	A	Q2	Q3	0 / 0	0–0
Wimbledon	A	2R	Q1	0 / 1	1–1
US Open	Q1	Q1	A	0 / 0	0–0
Win–loss	0–0	1–1	0–1	0 / 2	1–2
Career statistics
Tournaments	0	1	1	2	
Overall win–loss	0–0	1–1	0–1	1–2	
Year-end ranking	241	187	424		

=== Doubles ===
Current through the 2026 ATP Finals.

Tournament	2014	2015	2016	2017	2018	2019	2020	2021	2022	2023	2024	2025	2026	SR	W–L	Win %
Grand Slam tournaments
Australian Open	A	A	A	A	A	1R	1R	A	QF	1R	QF	SF	2R	0 / 7	10–7	59%
French Open	A	A	A	A	A	2R	QF	QF	3R	QF	3R	2R	3R	0 / 8	16–8	67%
Wimbledon	Q2	A	A	A	3R	2R	NH	1R	1R	SF	QF	3R	SF	0 / 8	15–8	65%
US Open	A	A	A	A	2R	1R	A	1R	3R	1R	F	3R	F	0 / 8	15–8	65%
Win–loss	0–0	0–0	0–0	0–0	3–2	2–4	3–2	3–3	6–4	6–4	12–4	9–4	12–4	0 / 31	56–31	64%
Year-end championship
ATP Finals	did not qualify							Alt	Alt	DNQ	W	RR	SF	1 / 3	8–4	67%
National representation
Summer Olympics	not held		A	not held				2R	not held		QF	not held		0 / 2	3–2	60%
Davis Cup	A	A	A	PO	QF	QR	A	SF	QF	G1	SF	SF	QF	0 / 5	23–2	92%
ATP 1000 tournaments
Indian Wells Open	A	A	A	A	A	A	NH	SF	2R	A	SF	A	2R	0 / 4	8–4	67%
Miami Open	A	A	A	A	A	A	NH	2R	A	A	SF	A	A	0 / 2	3–2	60%
Monte-Carlo Masters	A	A	A	A	A	A	NH	A	QF	SF	QF	QF	W	1 / 5	13–4	76%
Madrid Open	A	A	A	A	A	A	NH	SF	A	1R	2R	SF	1R	0 / 5	7–4	64%
Italian Open	A	A	A	A	A	A	A	A	A	2R	2R	QF	2R	0 / 4	5–3	63%
Canadian Open	A	A	A	A	A	A	NH	1R	1R	SF	QF	SF	A	0 / 5	7–5	58%
Cincinnati Open	A	A	A	A	A	A	1R	QF	F	2R	2R	2R	1R	0 / 7	8–7	53%
Shanghai Masters	A	A	A	A	A	A	not held			2R	A	W	QF	1 / 3	8–2	80%
Paris Masters	A	A	A	A	A	A	A	W	QF	1R	A	QF	2R	1 / 5	9–3	75%
Win–loss	0–0	0–0	0–0	0–0	0–0	0–0	0–1	14–4	7–5	9–6	12–7	16–6	10–5	3 / 40	68–34	67%
Career statistics
	2014	2015	2016	2017	2018	2019	2020	2021	2022	2023	2024	2025	2026	Career		
Tournaments	0	0	0	3	8	20	10	18	19	23	20	20	18	159		
Titles	0	0	0	0	1	1	0	4	1	1	2	2	2	14		
Finals	0	0	0	0	1	1	0	4	6	3	5	4	4	28		
Overall win–loss	0–0	0–0	0–0	2–3	15–7	17–19	8–10	38–13	36–20	34–21	44–19	43–19	35–15	272–146		
Win %	–	–	–	40%	68%	47%	44%	75%	64%	62%	70%	69%	70%	65%		
Year-end ranking (Note: Year-end ranking 2011: 811, 2012: 542, 2013: 156)	194	269	577	164	60	63	61	18	18	24	9	11	11			

=== Mixed doubles ===
Tournament	2022	2023	2024	2025	2026	SR	W–L
Grand Slam tournaments
Australian Open	2R	1R	1R	2R	2R	0 / 5	3–5
French Open	A	W	QF	1R	A	1 / 3	7–2
Wimbledon	A	A	A	A	A	0 / 0	0–0
US Open	1R	2R	1R	A	A	0 / 3	1–3
Win–loss	1–2	6–2	2–3	1–2	1–1	1 / 11	11–10
ATP 1000 tournaments
Indian Wells Open	not held		A	A	QF	0 / 1	1–1

== Grand Slam tournament finals ==
=== Doubles: 2 (2 runner-ups) ===
Result	Year	Tournament	Surface	Partner	Opponents	Score
Loss	2024	US Open	Hard	(Germany) Kevin Krawietz	(Australia) Max Purcell (Australia) Jordan Thompson	4–6, 6–7^{(4–7)}
Loss	2026	US Open	Hard	(Germany) Kevin Krawietz	(United States) Christian Harrison (United Kingdom) Neal Skupski	4–6, 6–7^{(6–8)}

=== Mixed doubles: 1 (1 title) ===
Result	Year	Tournament	Surface	Partner	Opponents	Score
Win	2023	French Open	Clay	(Japan) Miyu Kato	(Canada) Bianca Andreescu (New Zealand) Michael Venus	4–6, 6–4, [10–6]

== Other significant finals ==
=== Year-end championships ===
==== Doubles: 1 (1 title) ====
Result	Year	Tournament	Surface	Partner	Opponents	Score
Win	2024	ATP Finals, Turin	Hard (i)	(Germany) Kevin Krawietz	(El Salvador) Marcelo Arévalo (Croatia) Mate Pavić	7–6^{(7–5)}, 7–6^{(8–6)}

=== Masters 1000 ===
==== Doubles: 4 (3 titles, 1 runner-up) ====
Result	Year	Tournament	Surface	Partner	Opponents	Score
Win	2021	Paris Masters	Hard (i)	(New Zealand) Michael Venus	(France) Pierre-Hugues Herbert (France) Nicolas Mahut	6–3, 6–7^{(4–7)}, [11–9]
Loss	2022	Cincinnati Open	Hard	(New Zealand) Michael Venus	(United States) Rajeev Ram (United Kingdom) Joe Salisbury	6–7^{(4–7)}, 6–7^{(5–7)}
Win	2025	Shanghai Masters	Hard	(Germany) Kevin Krawietz	(Sweden) André Göransson (United States) Alex Michelsen	6–4, 6–4
Win	2026	Monte-Carlo Masters	Clay	(Germany) Kevin Krawietz	(El Salvador) Marcelo Arévalo (Croatia) Mate Pavić	4–6, 6–2, [10–8]

== ATP Tour finals ==
=== Doubles: 28 (14 titles, 14 runner-ups) ===
Legend Grand Slam (0–2) ATP Finals (1–0) ATP 1000 (3–1) ATP 500 (6–4) ATP 250 (4–7)	Finals by surface Hard (4–7) Clay (8–3) Grass (2–4)	Finals by setting Outdoor (12–13) Indoor (2–1)

Result	W–L	Date	Tournament	Tier	Surface	Partner	Opponents	Score
Win	1–0	Jun 2018	Stuttgart Open, Germany	ATP 250	Grass	(Germany) Philipp Petzschner	(Sweden) Robert Lindstedt (Poland) Marcin Matkowski	7–6^{(7–5)}, 6–3
Win	2–0	May 2019	Bavarian Championships, Germany	ATP 250	Clay	(Denmark) Frederik Nielsen	(Brazil) Marcelo Demoliner (India) Divij Sharan	6–4, 6–2
Win	3–0	May 2021	Estoril Open, Portugal	ATP 250	Clay	(Monaco) Hugo Nys	(United Kingdom) Luke Bambridge (United Kingdom) Dominic Inglot	7–5, 3–6, [10–3]
Win	4–0	May 2021	Lyon Open, France	ATP 250	Clay	(Monaco) Hugo Nys	(France) Pierre-Hugues Herbert (France) Nicolas Mahut	6–4, 5–7, [10–8]
Win	5–0	Jul 2021	Hamburg Open, Germany	ATP 500	Clay	(New Zealand) Michael Venus	(Germany) Kevin Krawietz (Romania) Horia Tecău	6–3, 6–7^{(3–7)}, [10–8]
Win	6–0	Nov 2021	Paris Masters, France	ATP 1000	Hard (i)	(New Zealand) Michael Venus	(France) Pierre-Hugues Herbert (France) Nicolas Mahut	6–3, 6–7^{(4–7)}, [11–9]
Loss	6–1	Feb 2022	Rotterdam Open, Netherlands	ATP 500	Hard (i)	(South Africa) Lloyd Harris	(Netherlands) Robin Haase (Netherlands) Matwé Middelkoop	6–4, 6–7^{(5–7)}, [5–10]
Win	7–1	Feb 2022	Dubai Championships, United Arab Emirates	ATP 500	Hard	(New Zealand) Michael Venus	(Croatia) Nikola Mektić (Croatia) Mate Pavić	6–3, 6–7^{(5–7)}, [16–14]
Loss	7–2	Jun 2022	Stuttgart Open, Germany	ATP 250	Grass	(New Zealand) Michael Venus	(Poland) Hubert Hurkacz (Croatia) Mate Pavić	6–7^{(3–7)}, 6–7^{(5–7)}
Loss	7–3	Jun 2022	Halle Open, Germany	ATP 500	Grass	(New Zealand) Michael Venus	(Spain) Marcel Granollers (Argentina) Horacio Zeballos	4–6, 7–6^{(7–5)}, [12–14]
Loss	7–4	Jul 2022	Austrian Open Kitzbühel, Austria	ATP 250	Clay	(New Zealand) Michael Venus	(Spain) Pedro Martínez (Italy) Lorenzo Sonego	7–5, 4–6, [8–10]
Loss	7–5	Aug 2022	Cincinnati Open, United States	ATP 1000	Hard	(New Zealand) Michael Venus	(United States) Rajeev Ram (United Kingdom) Joe Salisbury	6–7^{(4–7)}, 6–7^{(5–7)}
Loss	7–6	Apr 2023	Bavarian Championships, Germany	ATP 250	Clay	(Germany) Kevin Krawietz	(Austria) Alexander Erler (Austria) Lucas Miedler	3–6, 4–6
Loss	7–7	Jun 2023	Stuttgart Open, Germany	ATP 250	Grass	(Germany) Kevin Krawietz	(Croatia) Nikola Mektić (Croatia) Mate Pavić	6–7^{(2–7)}, 3–6
Win	8–7	Jul 2023	Hamburg Open, Germany (2)	ATP 500	Clay	(Germany) Kevin Krawietz	(Belgium) Sander Gillé (Belgium) Joran Vliegen	7–6^{(7–4)}, 6–3
Loss	8–8	Jan 2024	Brisbane International, Australia	ATP 250	Hard	(Germany) Kevin Krawietz	(United Kingdom) Lloyd Glasspool (Netherlands) Jean-Julien Rojer	6–7^{(3–7)}, 7–5, [10–12]
Loss	8–9	Jun 2024	Halle Open, Germany	ATP 500	Grass	(Germany) Kevin Krawietz	(Italy) Simone Bolelli (Italy) Andrea Vavassori	6–7^{(3–7)}, 6–7^{(5–7)}
Win	9–9	Jul 2024	Hamburg Open, Germany (3)	ATP 500	Clay	(Germany) Kevin Krawietz	(France) Fabien Reboul (France) Édouard Roger-Vasselin	7–6^{(10–8)}, 6–2
Loss	9–10	Sep 2024	US Open, United States	Grand Slam	Hard	(Germany) Kevin Krawietz	(Australia) Max Purcell (Australia) Jordan Thompson	4–6, 6–7^{(4–7)}
Win	10–10	Nov 2024	ATP Finals, Italy	ATP Finals	Hard (i)	(Germany) Kevin Krawietz	(El Salvador) Marcelo Arévalo (Croatia) Mate Pavić	7–6^{(7–5)}, 7–6^{(8–6)}
Loss	10–11	Jan 2025	Adelaide International, Australia	ATP 250	Hard	(Germany) Kevin Krawietz	(Italy) Simone Bolelli (Italy) Andrea Vavassori	6–4, 6–7^{(4–7)}, [9–11]
Loss	10–12	Apr 2025	Bavarian Championships, Germany	ATP 500	Clay	(Germany) Kevin Krawietz	(Sweden) André Göransson (Netherlands) Sem Verbeek	4–6, 4–6
Win	11–12	Jun 2025	Halle Open, Germany	ATP 500	Grass	(Germany) Kevin Krawietz	(Italy) Simone Bolelli (Italy) Andrea Vavassori	6–3, 7–6^{(7–4)}
Win	12–12	Oct 2025	Shanghai Masters, China	ATP 1000	Hard	(Germany) Kevin Krawietz	(Sweden) André Göransson (United States) Alex Michelsen	6–4, 6–4
Loss	12–13	Jan 2026	Adelaide International, Australia	ATP 250	Hard	(Germany) Kevin Krawietz	(Finland) Harri Heliövaara (United Kingdom) Henry Patten	3–6, 2–6
Win	13–13	Apr 2026	Monte-Carlo Masters, Monaco	ATP 1000	Clay	(Germany) Kevin Krawietz	(El Salvador) Marcelo Arévalo (Croatia) Mate Pavić	4–6, 6–2, [10–8]
Win	14–13	May 2026	Hamburg Open, Germany (4)	ATP 500	Clay	(Germany) Kevin Krawietz	(France) Sadio Doumbia (France) Fabien Reboul	6–3, 4–6, [10–8]
Loss	14–14	Sep 2026	US Open, United States	Grand Slam	Hard	(Germany) Kevin Krawietz	(United States) Christian Harrison (United Kingdom) Neal Skupski	4–6, 6–7^{(6–8)}

== ATP Challenger finals ==
=== Singles: 2 (0–2) ===
Result	W–L	Date	Tournament	Surface	Opponent	Score
Loss	0–1	Nov 2014	Eckental, Germany	Carpet (i)	(Belgium) Ruben Bemelmans	6–7^{(3–7)}, 3–6
Loss	0–2	Oct 2017	Ortisei, Italy	Hard (i)	(Italy) Lorenzo Sonego	4–6, 4–6

=== Doubles: 19 (15–4) ===
Result	W–L	Date	Tournament	Surface	Partner	Opponent	Score
Win	1–0	Aug 2013	Liberec, Czech Republic	Clay	(Australia) Rameez Junaid	(Australia) Colin Ebelthite (Chinese Taipei) Lee Hsin-han	6–0, 6–2
Win	2–0	Nov 2013	Ortisei, Italy	Hard (i)	(Germany) Christopher Kas	(Germany) Benjamin Becker (Italy) Daniele Bracciali	6–2, 7–5
Win	3–0	Apr 2014	Saint-Brieuc, France	Hard (i)	(Germany) Dominik Meffert	(Germany) Philipp Marx (Russia) Victor Baluda	6–4, 6–3
Loss	3–1	Apr 2014	Shenzhen, China	Hard	(Germany) Dominik Meffert	(Australia) Samuel Groth (Australia) Chris Guccione	3–6, 6–7^{(5–7)}
Win	4–1	May 2014	Heilbronn, Germany	Clay	(Germany) Andre Begemann	(Netherlands) Jesse Huta Galung (Australia) Rameez Junaid	6–3, 6–3
Win	5–1	Feb 2015	Wrocław, Poland	Hard (i)	(Germany) Philipp Petzschner	(Canada) Frank Dancevic (Poland) Andriej Kapaś	7–6^{(7–4)}, 6–3
Loss	5–2	May 2015	Heilbronn, Germany	Clay	(Germany) Dominik Meffert	(Poland) Mateusz Kowalczyk (Slovakia) Igor Zelenay	4–6, 3–6
Win	6–2	Sep 2016	Sibiu, Romania	Clay	(Netherlands) Robin Haase	(France) Jonathan Eysseric (France) Tristan Lamasine	6–4, 6–2
Win	7–2	Sep 2017	Genoa, Italy	Clay	(Germany) Jan-Lennard Struff	(Argentina) Guido Andreozzi (Uruguay) Ariel Behar	7–6^{(7–5)}, 7–6^{(10–8)}
Loss	7–3	Oct 2017	Ismaning, Germany	Carpet (i)	(Germany) Dustin Brown	(Croatia) Marin Draganja (Croatia) Tomislav Draganja	7–6^{(7–1)}, 2–6, [8–10]
Win	8–3	Jan 2018	Nouméa, New Caledonia	Hard	(France) Hugo Nys	(Colombia) Alejandro González (Spain) Jaume Munar	6–2, 6–2
Win	9–3	Mar 2018	Yokohama, Japan	Hard	(Germany) Tobias Kamke	(Thailand) Sanchai Ratiwatana (Thailand) Sonchat Ratiwatana	3–6, 7–5, [12–10]
Win	10–3	Mar 2018	Lille, France	Hard (i)	(France) Hugo Nys	(India) Jeevan Nedunchezhiyan (India) Purav Raja	7–6^{(7–3)}, 1–6, [10–7]
Win	11–3	May 2018	Aix-en-Provence, France	Clay	(Germany) Philipp Petzschner	(Argentina) Guido Andreozzi (France) Kenny de Schepper	6–7^{(3–7)}, 6–2, [10–8]
Win	12–3	Apr 2019	Tunis, Tunisia	Clay	(Belgium) Ruben Bemelmans	(Argentina) Facundo Argüello (Argentina) Guillermo Durán	6–3, 6–1
Loss	12–4	May 2019	Aix-en-Provence, France	Clay	(Denmark) Frederik Nielsen	(Germany) Kevin Krawietz (Austria) Jürgen Melzer	6–7^{(5–7)}, 2–6
Win	13–4	Nov 2019	Bratislava, Slovakia	Hard (i)	(Denmark) Frederik Nielsen	(Czech Republic) Roman Jebavý (Slovakia) Igor Zelenay	4–6, 7–6^{(7–4)}, [11–9]
Win	14–4	Nov 2019	Helsinki, Finland	Hard (i)	(Denmark) Frederik Nielsen	(Croatia) Tomislav Draganja (Russia) Pavel Kotov	7–6^{(7–2)}, 6–0
Win	15–4	Feb 2021	Biella, Italy	Hard (i)	(Monaco) Hugo Nys	(United Kingdom) Lloyd Glasspool (Finland) Harri Heliövaara	7–6^{(7–4)}, 6–3

== ITF Futures finals ==
=== Singles: 11 (7–4) ===
Result	W–L	Date	Tournament	Surface	Opponent	Score
Win	1–0	Oct 2011	Leimen, Germany	Hard (i)	(France) Pierre-Hugues Herbert	6–3, 6–3
Loss	1–1	Nov 2011	Amelia Island, United States	Clay	(Czech Republic) Rudolf Siwy	6–4, 5–7, 3–6
Win	2–1	Sep 2012	Sarreguemine, France	Carpet (i)	(France) Elie Rousset	7–5, 6–2
Loss	2–2	Oct 2012	Cardiff, Great Britain	Hard (i)	(Germany) Bastian Knittel	1–6, 2–6
Win	3–2	Jan 2013	Bagnoles, France	Clay (i)	(Hungary) Márton Fucsovics	6–0, 4–1, ret.
Win	4–2	Mar 2013	Gatineau, Canada	Hard (i)	(United States) Austin Krajicek	6–2, 6–4
Win	5–2	Jun 2013	Essen, Germany	Clay	(Germany) Steven Moneke	6–2, 7–5
Win	6–2	Sep 2013	Forbach, France	Carpet (i)	(Germany) Oscar Otte	6–2, 6–2
Loss	6–3	Mar 2014	Taverne, Switzerland	Carpet (i)	(Switzerland) Henri Laaksonen	6–4, 4–6, 6–7^{(6–8)}
Loss	6–4	Feb 2017	Bellevue, Switzerland	Carpet (i)	(Germany) Daniel Altmaier	5–7, 6–7^{(5–7)}
Win	7–4	Aug 2017	Neuchatel, Switzerland	Clay	(Japan) Hiroyasu Ehara	6–2, 6–2

=== Doubles: 12 (4–8) ===
Result	W–L	Date	Tournament	Surface	Partner	Opponent	Score
Loss	0–1	Jul 2006	Wetzlar, Germany	Clay	(Mexico) Fernando Cabrera	(Romania) Artemon Apostu-Efremov (Luxembourg) Laurent Bram	2–6, 3–6
Win	1–1	Sep 2011	Kempten, Germany	Clay	(Germany) Steven Moneke	(Germany) Andre Wiesler (Germany) Marcel Zimmermann	6–2, 6–3
Loss	1–2	Oct 2011	Leimen, Germany	Hard (i)	(Ivory Coast) Terence Nugent	(Romania) Victor Anagnastopol (Romania) Florin Mergea	6–7^{(3–7)}, 2–6
Loss	1–3	Nov 2011	Amelia Island, United States	Clay	(France) Alexandre Lacroix	(Czech Republic) Rudolf Siwy (Italy) Matteo Viola	6–7^{(3–7)}, 1–6
Win	2–3	Aug 2012	Wetzlar, Germany	Clay	(Germany) Steven Moneke	(Germany) Andre Begemann (Mexico) Alejandro Figueroa	6–2, 6–0
Loss	2–4	Oct 2012	La Roche-sur-Yon, France	Hard (i)	(Germany) Moritz Baumann	(South Africa) Jean Andersen (France) Hugo Nys	6–7^{(6–8)}, 6–7^{(3–7)}
Win	3–4	Dec 2012	Jakarta, Indonesia	Hard	(New Zealand) Michael Venus	(United Kingdom) Brydan Klein (Australia) Dane Propoggia	7–5, 6–3
Loss	3–5	Jan 2013	Bagnoles, France	Clay (i)	(Germany) Moritz Baumann	(Spain) Ivan Arenas-Gualda (Spain) Enrique López-Pérez	walkover
Win	4–5	Mar 2013	Gatineau, Canada	Hard (i)	(Germany) Moritz Baumann	(United States) Adam El Mihdawy (Canada) Peter Polansky	7–6^{(7–0)}, 6–1
Loss	4–6	Apr 2013	Angers, France	Clay	(Belgium) Niels Desein	(Serbia) Ivan Bjelica (Serbia) Miljan Zekić	3–6, 4–6
Loss	4–7	Apr 2013	Grasse, France	Clay	(Germany) Jeremy Jahn	(France) Jonathan Eysseric (France) Nicolas Renavand	6–7^{(6–8)}, 4–6
Loss	4–8	Sep 2013	Forbach, France	Carpet (i)	(Germany) Lukas Storck	(Germany) Andreas Mies (Germany) Oscar Otte	7–6^{(9–7)}, 2–6, [7–10]

== National participation ==
=== Davis Cup (23–2) ===
Group membership Finals / World Group (13–2) Qualifying round / Play-offs (9–0) World Group I (1–0)	Matches by type Singles (0–0) Doubles (23–2)	Matches by surface Hard (19–2) Clay (4–0)	Matches by venue Germany (7–0) Away (9–0) Neutral (7–2)

Date	Venue	Surface	Rd	Opponent nation	Score	Match	Opponent players	W/L	Rubber score
2017
Sep 2017	Oeiras	Clay	PO	Portugal	3–2	Doubles (w/ J-L Struff)	G Elias / J Sousa	Win	6–2, 4–6, 6–7^{(5–7)}, 6–4, 6–4
2018
Feb 2018	Brisbane	Hard	1R	Australia	3–1	Doubles (w/ J-L Struff)	M Ebden / J Peers	Win	6–4, 6–7^{(5–7)}, 6–2, 6–7^{(4–7)}, 6–4
Apr 2018	Valencia	Clay	QF	Spain	2–3	Doubles (w/ J-L Struff)	F López / M López	Win	6–3, 6–4, 3–6, 6–7^{(4–7)}, 7–5
2019
Feb 2019	Frankfurt	Hard (i)	QR	Hungary	5–0	Doubles (w/ J-L Struff)	G Borsos / P Nagy	Win	6–2, 6–3
2020–21
Nov 2021	Innsbruck	Hard (i)	RR	Serbia	2–1	Doubles (w/ K Krawietz)	N Ćaćić / N Djokovic	Win	7–6^{(7–5)}, 3–6, 7–6^{(7–5)}
Nov 2021	Innsbruck	Hard (i)	RR	Austria	2–1	Doubles (w/ K Krawietz)	O Marach / P Oswald	Win	6–3, 6–4
Nov 2021	Innsbruck	Hard (i)	QF	Great Britain	2–1	Doubles (w/ K Krawietz)	J Salisbury / N Skupski	Win	7–6^{(12–10)}, 7–6^{(7–5)}
Dec 2021	Madrid	Hard (i)	SF	Russia	1–2	Doubles (w/ K Krawietz)	A Karatsev / K Khachanov	Win	4–6, 6–3, 6–4
2022
Mar 2022	Rio de Janeiro	Clay	QR	Brazil	3–1	Doubles (w/ K Krawietz)	F Meligeni Alves / B Soares	Win	4–6, 7–6^{(7–4)}, 6–4
Sep 2022	Hamburg	Hard (i)	RR	France	2–1	Doubles (w/ K Krawietz)	N Mahut / A Rinderknech	Win	6–2, 3–6, 7–6^{(7–1)}
Sep 2022	Hamburg	Hard (i)	RR	Belgium	2–1	Doubles (w/ K Krawietz)	S Gillé / J Vliegen	Win	4–6, 6–2, 7–6^{(7–5)}
Sep 2022	Hamburg	Hard (i)	RR	Australia	2–1	Doubles (w/ K Krawietz)	M Ebden / M Purcell	Win	6–4, 6–4
Nov 2022	Málaga	Hard (i)	QF	Canada	1–2	Doubles (w/ K Krawietz)	V Pospisil / D Shapovalov	Loss	6–2, 3–6, 3–6
2023
Feb 2023	Trier	Hard (i)	QR	Switzerland	2–3	Doubles (w/ A Mies)	D Stricker / S Wawrinka	Win	6–7^{(3–7)}, 6–3, 6–4
Sep 2023	Mostar	Clay	WG1	(Bosnia and Herzegovina) Bosnia & Herz.	4–0	Doubles (w/ K Krawietz)	M Bašić / D Džumhur	Win	6–4, 6–2
2024
Feb 2024	Tatabánya	Hard (i)	QR	Hungary	3–2	Doubles (w/ K Krawietz)	F Marozsán / M Valkusz	Win	6–3, 7–6^{(7–3)}
Sep 2024	Zhuhai	Hard	RR	Slovakia	3–0	Doubles (w/ K Krawietz)	L Klein / I Zelenay	Win	7–5, 6–3
Sep 2024	Zhuhai	Hard	RR	Chile	3–0	Doubles (w/ K Krawietz)	T Barrios Vera / M Soto	Win	6–1, 6–3
Sep 2024	Zhuhai	Hard	RR	United States	1–2	Doubles (w/ K Krawietz)	A Krajicek / R Ram	Win	6–1, 7–6^{(7–4)}
2025
Feb 2025	Vilnius	Hard (i)	Q1	Israel	3–1	Doubles (w/ K Krawietz)	D Cukierman / A Vales	Win	6–0, 6–3
Sep 2025	Tokyo	Hard (i)	Q2	Japan	4–0	Doubles (w/ K Krawietz)	Y Watanuki / T Yuzuki	Win	6–3, 7–6^{(7–4)}
Nov 2025	Bologna	Hard (i)	QF	Argentina	2–1	Doubles (w/ K Krawietz)	A Molteni / H Zeballos	Win	4–6, 6–4, 7–6^{(12–10)}
Nov 2025	Bologna	Hard (i)	SF	Spain	1–2	Doubles (w/ K Krawietz)	M Granollers / P Martínez	Loss	2–6, 6–3, 3–6
2026
Feb 2026	Düsseldorf	Hard (i)	Q1	Peru	4–0	Doubles (w/ K Krawietz)	I Buse / A Huertas del Pino	Win	6–0, 2–6, 6–4
Sep 2026	Halle	Hard (i)	Q2	Croatia	3–1	Doubles (w/ K Krawietz)	N Mektić / M Pavić	Win	6–2, 7–5

=== United Cup (2–0) ===
Venue	Surface	Rd	Opponent nation	Score	Match	Opponent players	W/L	Match score
2025
Perth	Hard	RR	Brazil	3–0	Mixed doubles (w/ L Siegemund)	C Alves / R Matos	Win	7–6^{(10–8)}, 6–4
Perth	Hard	QF	Kazakhstan	1–2	Mixed doubles (w/ L Siegemund)	Z Kulambayeva / D Popko	Win	6–2, 6–2

=== ATP Cup (1–1) ===
Venue	Surface	Rd	Opponent nation	Score	Match	Opponent players	W/L	Match score
2022
Sydney	Hard	RR	United States	2–1	Doubles (w/ K Krawietz)	T Fritz / J Isner	Loss	0–6, 3–6
Sydney	Hard	RR	Canada	1–2	Doubles (w/ K Krawietz)	S Diez / B Schnur	Win	6–3, 6–4
