= Lloyd Glasspool =

British tennis player (born 1993)

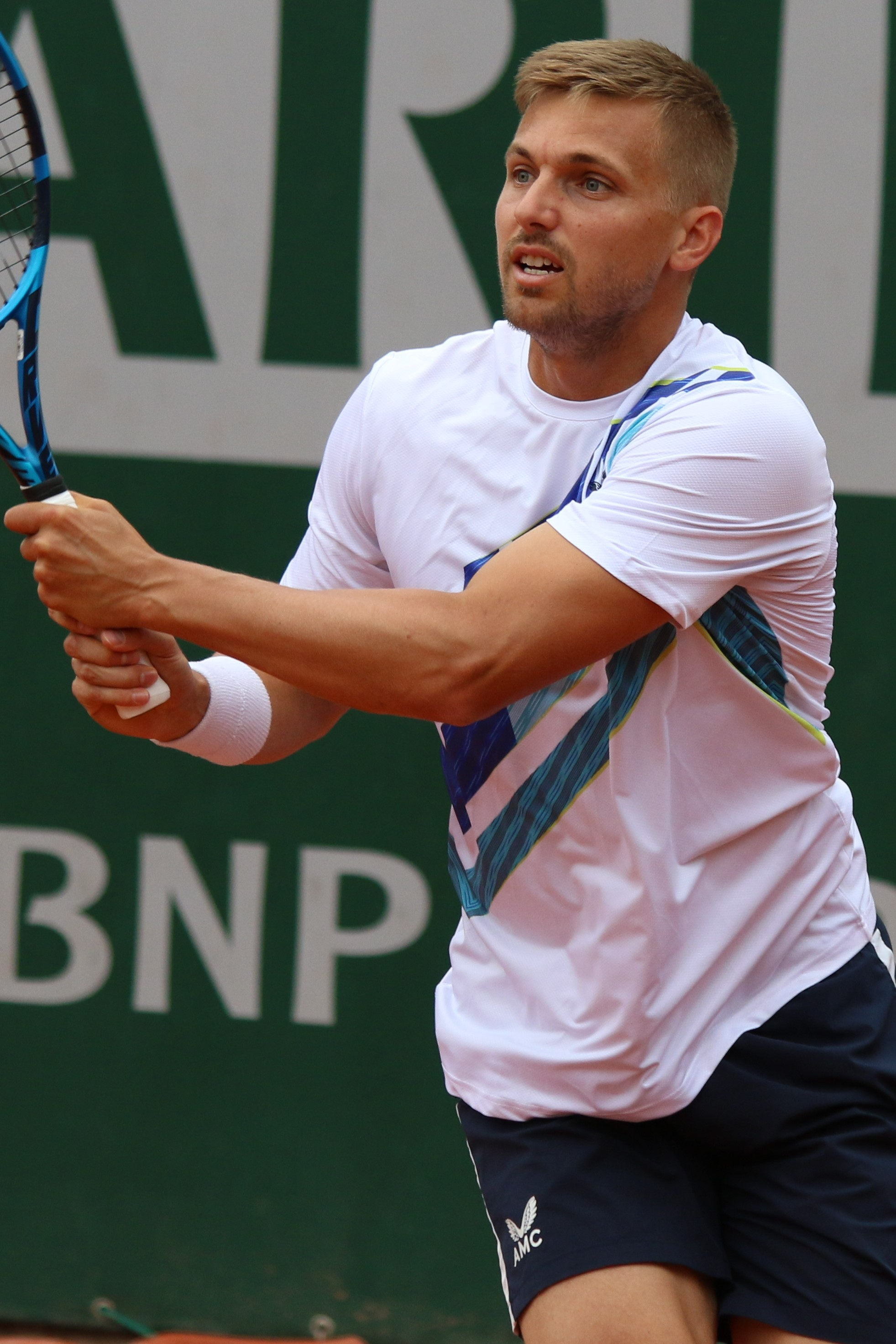
- Glasspool at the 2022 French Open
- Country (sports): (United Kingdom) Great Britain
- Residence: Birmingham, England
- Born: 19 November 1993 (age 32) Redditch, England
- Height: 6 ft 3 in (1.91 m)
- Turned pro: 2015
- Plays: Right-handed (two-handed backhand)
- College: Texas
- Coach: Oliver Plaskett
- Prize money: US $4,624,736

Singles
- Career record: 0–0
- Highest ranking: No. 282 (25 July 2016)

Grand Slam singles results
- Wimbledon: Q2 (2018)

Doubles
- Career record: 224–130
- Career titles: 16
- Highest ranking: No. 1 (18 August 2025)
- Current ranking: No. 21 (9 November 2026)

Grand Slam doubles results
- Australian Open: QF (2025)
- French Open: QF (2022)
- Wimbledon: W (2025)
- US Open: QF (2022)

Other doubles tournaments
- Tour Finals: SF (2022, 2025)

Mixed doubles
- Career record: 7–10
- Career titles: 0

Grand Slam mixed doubles results
- Australian Open: 2R (2024, 2025, 2026)
- French Open: QF (2023, 2025)
- Wimbledon: 2R (2026)
- US Open: 1R (2023, 2026)
- Last updated on: 9 November 2026.

Lloyd Glasspool (born 19 November 1993) is a British professional tennis player who specialises in doubles. He has a career-high ranking of ATP world No. 1 in doubles, achieved on 18 August 2025, becoming the fourth British player to hold the top spot. Glasspool won the 2025 Wimbledon title with Julian Cash, the first all-British team to win the title in 89 years. He has won an additional 15 ATP Tour and five ATP Challenger doubles titles. He also has a career best singles ranking of No. 282 reached on 25 July 2016.

== Career ==
Glasspool studied at the University of Texas at Austin, where partnering Søren Hess-Olesen he captured the 2015 NCAA doubles championship.

=== 2016: ATP debut ===
Glasspool made his ATP Tour debut (in doubles) at the 2016 Wimbledon Championships having been given a wildcard to partner compatriot Dan Evans in the main draw.

=== 2021: Partnership with Heliövaara, maiden title, Wimbledon third round ===
Partnering Harri Heliövaara, Glasspool won his first ATP Tour title at the 2021 Open 13 against Sander Arends and David Pel of the Netherlands in March.

=== 2022: Two Major quarterfinals & ATP Finals semifinal, ATP 500 title, top 15 ===
In May 2022, on their debut at the Italian Open, Glasspool and Heliövaara reached their first quarterfinal at a Masters 1000 level as alternates, defeating top seeds, world No. 1, Joe Salisbury, and world No. 2, Rajeev Ram, en route, marking their first win at this level.

At the French Open, he reached a major quarterfinal for the first time in his career with Heliövaara. As a result, he moved into the top 50, at world No. 49 on 13 June 2022. The pair continued with their successful season reaching their first final on grass at the Queen's Club. Next they advanced to the third round at Wimbledon for the second consecutive year.

They won the biggest title at the ATP 500 European Open defeating Matwe Middelkoop and Rohan Bopanna. At the Croatia Open Umag they reached the semifinals defeating wildcards Mili Poljicak and Nino Serdarusic. Next they defeated second seeds Rafael Matos and David Vega Hernandez to reach their fifth final of the season.

At the Canadian Open the pair reached a second Masters quarterfinal for the season where they lost to third seeds Koolhof/Skupski. He reached the top 30 on 22 August 2022 at No. 28.

Seeded 11th at the US Open they reached their second quarterfinal and first at this Major defeating 8th seeded pair of Kyrgios/Kokkinakis. The pair reached their sixth final of the season at the 2022 Moselle Open. As a result, Glasspool reached the top 20 in the rankings on 26 September 2022.

On 4 November the pair qualified for their first 2022 ATP FinalsATP Finals after reaching their first Masters semifinal in Paris and Glasspool moved into the top 15. They qualified for the semifinals defeating Arévalo/Rojer and Granollers/Zeballos both matches in straight sets.

=== 2023: Third title, Masters semifinal, World No. 7 ===
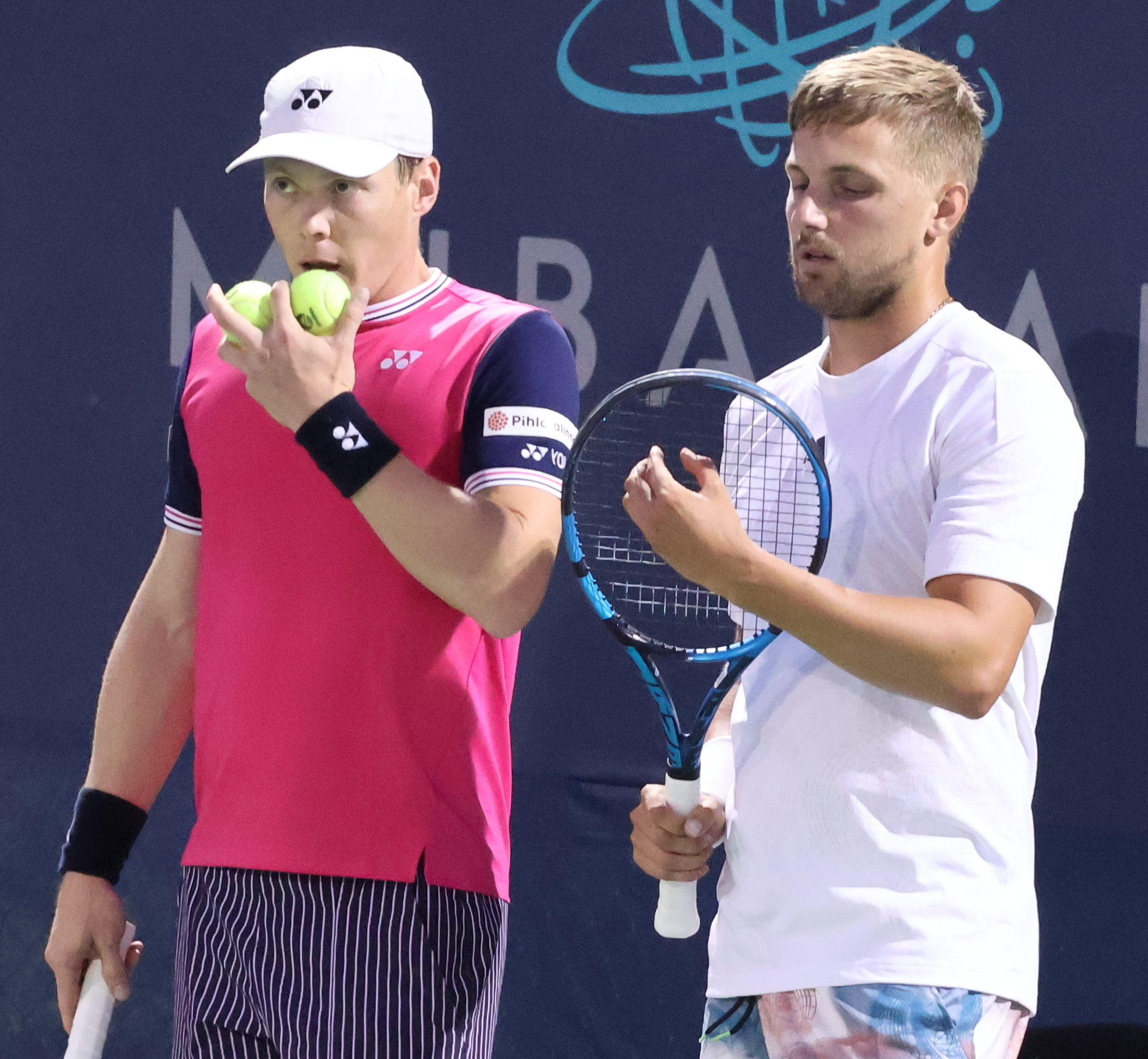
Harri Heliövaara and Glasspool at the 2023 DC Open

He won his third title with his partner Heliövaara in Adelaide. He also reached his tenth final in Dubai with Heliövaara. He made his top 10 debut following the Rome Masters after winning the 2023 BNP Paribas Primrose Bordeaux Challenger 175 with Heliövaara.

=== 2024: Two ATP titles, Masters finalist, new partnership with Cash ===
Glasspool partnered with Jean-Julien Rojer and the pair won their first title at the Brisbane International.

With new partner, fellow Briton Julian Cash, he won the Japan Open, defeating Ariel Behar and Robert Galloway in the final. At the Paris Masters where he partnered for the first time with Adam Pavlásek, the unseeded alternate pair reached the final with wins over fifth seeded Italian duo Simone Bolelli and Andrea Vavassori, local favorites Sadio Doumbia and Fabien Reboul, and US Open champions and fourth seeded Australian duo Max Purcell and Jordan Thompson. They lost the final to sixth seeds Wesley Koolhof and Nikola Mektić in a deciding champions tiebreak.

=== 2025: Wimbledon champion, Masters title, World No. 1 ===
Reuniting with Julian Cash, Glasspool won the title at the Brisbane International as defending champion, defeating Jiří Lehečka and Jakub Menšík in the final. Glasspool and Cash defeated Ariel Behar and Robert Galloway in a deciding set tiebreak to reach the quarterfinals at the Australian Open, where they lost to fourth seeds Kevin Krawietz and Tim Pütz.

In February, Glasspool and Cash defeated fellow Britons Joe Salisbury and Neal Skupski in straight sets to win their second title of the year at the Qatar Open. At the Miami Open Glasspool reached the final with Cash defeating Pedro Martinez and Giovanni Mpetshi Perricard, Yuki Bhambri and Nuno Borges, and then second seeded pair Harri Heliovaara and Henry Patten, before losing to top seeds Marcelo Arévalo and Mate Pavić.

In April, Glasspool and Cash were runners-up at the Monte-Carlo Masters, losing to Romain Arneodo and Manuel Guinard in the final which went to a deciding champions tiebreak.

Seeded second on the grass-courts at 's-Hertogenbosch in June, they reached the final, but again lost in a deciding champions tiebreak to third seeds Matthew Ebden and Jordan Thompson. The following week, Glasspool and Cash became the first all-British pairing to win the doubles title at the Queen's Club Championships in the Open Era, defeating Nikola Mektić and Michael Venus in the final. Five days later, they made it back-to-back titles by defeating Ariel Behar and Joran Vliegen in the final at the Eastbourne Open. At Wimbledon, Glasspool and Cash defeated defending champions Harri Heliövaara and Henry Patten in the quarterfinals, then fourth seeds Marcel Granollers and Horacio Zeballos in the semifinals to become the first all-British pair to reach the final in the Open Era. In the final they defeated Rinky Hijikata and David Pel, becoming the first all-British team to win the title in 89 years. Glasspool reached a career-high of world No.3 on 14 July 2025, becoming British men's doubles No. 1 for the first time in the process.

In August at the Canadian Open, Glasspool and Cash extended their winning streak to 19 matches by defeating Joe Salisbury and Neal Skupski in the final to win their first ATP Masters 1000 title and in the process becoming the first team to qualify for the 2025 ATP Finals. Following reaching the semifinals at the Cincinnati Open, defeating Matthew Ebden/Jordan Thompson and Simone Bolelli/Andrea Vavassori, Glasspool claimed the top World No. 1 spot in the doubles rankings on 18 August 2025. Their loss to Rajeev Ram and Nikola Mektić ended their 22 match winning streak.

The following month, Glasspool and Cash made their debuts for the Great Britain Davis Cup team together against Poland in their World Group I tie in Gdynia, losing to Karol Drzewiecki and Jan Zieliński.

In October, Glasspool and Cash won the Vienna Open, defeating Lucas Miedler and Francisco Cabral in the final. They were runners-up at the Paris Masters, losing to Harri Heliövaara and Henry Patten in the final.

After defeating Kevin Krawietz and Tim Pütz in their second group match at the ATP Finals, Glasspool and Cash secured the year-end ATP No. 1 doubles team ranking, becoming the first all British pair to achieve the feat. They went on to reach the semifinals at the season-ending showpiece event, but lost to Joe Salisbury and Neal Skupski in a match which went to a deciding champions tiebreak.

=== 2026: 10th title with Cash, first Davis Cup match win ===
Cash and Glasspool began their 2026 season by reaching the final at the Brisbane International, losing to Francisco Cabral and Lucas Miedler. In February they defeated Nicolai Budkov Kjær and Viktor Durasovic to claim their first Davis Cup match win and help Great Britain to a 4–0 overall tie victory against Norway in the first round qualifier in Oslo. Two weeks later at the Qatar Open, Cash and Glasspool made it through to their second final of the year, but they again had to settle for being runners-up as they lost to Harri Heliövaara and Henry Patten.

Playing alongside Gabriela Dabrowski, Glasspool was runner-up in the invitational mixed doubles event at the Indian Wells Open in March, losing to Flavio Cobolli and Belinda Bencic in the final which went to a deciding champions tiebreak.

In April at the Barcelona Open, Cash and Glasspool defeated Pierre-Hugues Herbert and Andrea Vavassori in the final to claim their first title of the season.

Defending their title at Wimbledon, they lost in the quarterfinals to sixth seeds Marcelo Arévalo and Mate Pavić.

Seeded third at the Washington Open, Glasspool and Cash won their second ATP Tour title of the season and 10th as a partnership overall, defeating Austin Krajicek and Nikola Mektić in the final. In October, they won the China Open, overcoming Sander Arends and David Pel in the final. Three weeks later, as top seeds Glasspool and Cash won the Lyon Open, defeating second seeds Théo Arribagé and Albano Olivetti in the final.

== Personal life ==
Glasspool is the son of an English father and Welsh mother. From 2016 to 2018, Glasspool was in a relationship with fellow tennis professional Heather Watson.

He is the younger brother of former Hollyoaks actor Parry Glasspool.

== Doubles performance timeline ==
Key
W	F	SF	QF	#R	RR	Q#	DNQ	A	NH

(W) winner; (F) finalist; (SF) semifinalist; (QF) quarterfinalist; (#R) rounds 4, 3, 2, 1; (RR) round-robin stage; (Q#) qualification round; (DNQ) did not qualify; (A) absent; (NH) not held; (SR) strike rate (events won / competed); (W–L) win–loss record.
To avoid confusion and double counting, these charts are updated at the conclusion of a tournament or when the player's participation has ended.

=== Doubles ===
Current through the 2026 Washington Open.

Tournament	2016	2017	2018	2019	2020	2021	2022	2023	2024	2025	2026	SR	W–L
Grand Slam tournaments
Australian Open	A	A	A	A	A	A	2R	2R	3R	QF	2R	0 / 5	8–5
French Open	A	A	A	A	A	A	QF	3R	1R	3R	2R	0 / 5	8–5
Wimbledon	1R	Q1	Q2	1R	NH	3R	3R	2R	3R	W	QF	1 / 8	16–6
US Open	A	A	A	A	A	1R	QF	2R	2R	1R	3R	0 / 6	7–6
Win–loss	0–1	0–0	0–0	0–1	0–0	2–1	9–4	5–4	5–4	11–3	5–3	1 / 24	39–23
Year-end championship
ATP Finals	Did not qualify						SF	DNQ		SF		0 / 2	4–4
National representation
Davis Cup	A	A	A	A	A		A	A	A	G1		0 / 1	1–1
ATP Tour Masters 1000
Indian Wells Open	A	A	A	A	NH	A	A	QF	QF	2R	1R	0 / 4	5–4
Miami Open	A	A	A	A	NH	A	1R	QF	QF	F	2R	0 / 5	9–5
Monte-Carlo Masters	A	A	A	A	NH	A	A	QF	1R	F	QF	0 / 4	7–4
Madrid Open	A	A	A	A	NH	A	A	2R	2R	A	1R	0 / 3	2–3
Italian Open	A	A	A	A	A	A	QF	2R	1R	A	1R	0 / 4	3–4
Canadian Open	A	A	A	A	NH	A	QF	1R	2R	W	1R	1 / 5	8–4
Cincinnati Open	A	A	A	A	A	A	2R	1R	1R	SF	1R	0 / 5	4–5
Shanghai Masters	A	A	A	A	NH			1R	2R	A	F	0 / 3	4–3
Paris Masters	A	A	A	A	A	A	SF	A	F	F		0 / 3	9–3
Win–loss	0–0	0–0	0–0	0–0	0–0	0–0	7–5	8–8	11–9	20–5	2–5	1 / 36	51–35
Career statistics
Tournaments	1	0	0	2	0	8	28	24	33	23	17	136	
Titles	0	0	0	0	0	1	1	1	2	7	2	14	
Finals	0	0	0	0	0	1	7	3	4	11	4	30	
Win–loss	0–1	0–0	0–0	1–2	0–0	8–6	47–28	34–24	37–31	60–17	25–15	212–124	
Win %	0%	0%	0%	33%	0%	57%	62%	58%	54%	78%	63%	63%	
Year-end ranking	359	843	—	257	152	78	12	31	23	1			

=== Mixed doubles ===
Tournament	2021	2022	2023	2024	2025	2026	SR	W–L
Australian Open	A	A	A	2R	2R	2R	0 / 3	3–3
French Open	A	1R	QF	A	QF		0 / 3	4–3
Wimbledon	1R (Note: Lloyd Glasspool and Jodie Burrage walkover in the first-round match at the 2021 Wimbledon Championships against Luke Bambridge and Asia Muhammad (so doesn't count as a loss).)	A	1R	1R	1R		0 / 4	0–3
US Open	A	A	1R	A	A	A	0 / 1	0–1
Win–loss	0–0	0–1	2–3	1–2	3–3	1–1	0 / 11	7–10

== Significant finals ==
=== Grand Slam tournaments ===
==== Doubles: 1 (1 win) ====
Result	Year	Tournament	Surface	Partner	Opponents	Score
Win	2025	Wimbledon	Grass	(United Kingdom) Julian Cash	(Australia) Rinky Hijikata (Netherlands) David Pel	6–2, 7–6^{(7–3)}

=== Masters 1000 finals ===
==== Doubles: 5 (1 title, 4 runner-ups) ====
Outcome	Year	Championship	Surface	Partner	Opponents	Score
Loss	2024	Paris Masters	Hard (i)	(Czech Republic) Adam Pavlásek	(Netherlands) Wesley Koolhof (Croatia) Nikola Mektić	6–3, 3–6, [5–10]
Loss	2025	Miami Open	Hard	(United Kingdom) Julian Cash	(El Salvador) Marcelo Arévalo (Croatia) Mate Pavić	6–7^{(3–7)}, 3–6
Loss	2025	Monte-Carlo Masters	Clay	(United Kingdom) Julian Cash	(Monaco) Romain Arneodo (France) Manuel Guinard	6–1, 6–7^{(8–10)}, [8–10]
Win	2025	Canadian Open	Hard	(United Kingdom) Julian Cash	(United Kingdom) Joe Salisbury (United Kingdom) Neal Skupski	6–3, 6–7^{(5–7)}, [13–11]
Loss	2025	Paris Masters	Hard (i)	(United Kingdom) Julian Cash	(Finland) Harri Heliövaara (United Kingdom) Henry Patten	4–6, 4–6

== ATP career finals ==
=== Doubles: 32 (16 titles, 16 runner-ups) ===
Legend Grand Slam tournaments (1–0) ATP Finals (0–0) ATP Tour Masters 1000 (1–4) ATP Tour 500 Series (8–3) ATP Tour 250 Series (6–9)	Finals by surface Hard (11–11) Clay (2–3) Grass (3–2)	Finals by setting Outdoor (13–10) Indoor (3–6)

Result	W–L	Date	Tournament	Tier	Surface	Partner	Opponents	Score
Win	1–0	Mar 2021	Open 13, France	250 Series	Hard (i)	(Finland) Harri Heliövaara	(Netherlands) Sander Arends (Netherlands) David Pel	7–5, 7–6^{(7–4)}
Loss	1–1	Feb 2022	Open Sud de France, France	250 Series	Hard (i)	(Finland) Harri Heliövaara	(France) Pierre-Hugues Herbert (France) Nicolas Mahut	6–4, 6–7^{(3–7)}, [10–12]
Loss	1–2	Feb 2022	Dallas Open, United States	250 Series	Hard (i)	(Finland) Harri Heliövaara	(El Salvador) Marcelo Arévalo (Netherlands) Jean-Julien Rojer	6–7^{(4–7)}, 4–6
Loss	1–3	Jun 2022	Queen's Club Championships, United Kingdom	500 Series	Grass	(Finland) Harri Heliövaara	(Croatia) Nikola Mektić (Croatia) Mate Pavić	6–3, 6–7^{(3–7)}, [6–10]
Win	2–3	Jul 2022	Hamburg European Open, Germany	500 Series	Clay	(Finland) Harri Heliövaara	(India) Rohan Bopanna (Netherlands) Matwé Middelkoop	6–2, 6–4
Loss	2–4	Jul 2022	Croatia Open, Croatia	250 Series	Clay	(Finland) Harri Heliövaara	(Italy) Simone Bolelli (Italy) Fabio Fognini	7–5, 6–7^{(6–8)}, [7–10]
Loss	2–5	Sep 2022	Moselle Open, France	250 Series	Hard (i)	(Finland) Harri Heliövaara	(Monaco) Hugo Nys (Poland) Jan Zieliński	6–7^{(5–7)}, 4–6
Loss	2–6	Oct 2022	Stockholm Open, Sweden	250 Series	Hard (i)	(Finland) Harri Heliövaara	(El Salvador) Marcelo Arévalo (Netherlands) Jean-Julien Rojer	3–6, 3–6
Win	3–6	Jan 2023	Adelaide International 1, Australia	250 Series	Hard	(Finland) Harri Heliövaara	(United Kingdom) Jamie Murray (New Zealand) Michael Venus	6–3, 7–6^{(7–3)}
Loss	3–7	Feb 2023	Dubai Tennis Championships, United Arab Emirates	500 Series	Hard	(Finland) Harri Heliövaara	(United States) Maxime Cressy (France) Fabrice Martin	6–7^{(2–7)}, 4–6
Loss	3–8	Aug 2023	Winston-Salem Open, United States	250 Series	Hard	(United Kingdom) Neal Skupski	(United States) Nathaniel Lammons (United States) Jackson Withrow	3–6, 4–6
Win	4–8	Jan 2024	Brisbane International, Australia	250 Series	Hard	(Netherlands) Jean-Julien Rojer	(Germany) Kevin Krawietz (Germany) Tim Pütz	7–6^{(7–3)}, 5–7, [12–10]
Loss	4–9	May 2024	Geneva Open, Switzerland	250 Series	Clay	(Netherlands) Jean-Julien Rojer	(El Salvador) Marcelo Arévalo (Croatia) Mate Pavić	6–7^{(2–7)}, 5–7
Win	5–9	Oct 2024	Japan Open, Japan	500 Series	Hard	(United Kingdom) Julian Cash	(Uruguay) Ariel Behar (United States) Robert Galloway	6–4, 4–6, [12–10]
Loss	5–10	Nov 2024	Paris Masters, France	Masters 1000	Hard (i)	(Czech Republic) Adam Pavlásek	(Netherlands) Wesley Koolhof (Croatia) Nikola Mektić	6–3, 3–6, [5–10]
Win	6–10	Jan 2025	Brisbane International, Australia (2)	250 Series	Hard	(United Kingdom) Julian Cash	(Czech Republic) Jiří Lehečka (Czech Republic) Jakub Menšík	6–3, 6–7^{(2–7)}, [10–6]
Win	7–10	Feb 2025	Qatar Open, Qatar	500 Series	Hard	(United Kingdom) Julian Cash	(United Kingdom) Joe Salisbury (United Kingdom) Neal Skupski	6–3, 6–2
Loss	7–11	Mar 2025	Miami Open, United States	Masters 1000	Hard	(United Kingdom) Julian Cash	(El Salvador) Marcelo Arévalo (Croatia) Mate Pavić	6–7^{(3–7)}, 3–6
Loss	7–12	Apr 2025	Monte-Carlo Masters, Monaco	Masters 1000	Clay	(United Kingdom) Julian Cash	(Monaco) Romain Arneodo (France) Manuel Guinard	6–1, 6–7^{(8–10)}, [8–10]
Loss	7–13	Jun 2025	Rosmalen Championships, Netherlands	250 Series	Grass	(United Kingdom) Julian Cash	(Australia) Matthew Ebden (Australia) Jordan Thompson	4–6, 6–3, [7–10]
Win	8–13	Jun 2025	Queen's Club Championships, United Kingdom	500 Series	Grass	(United Kingdom) Julian Cash	(Croatia) Nikola Mektić (New Zealand) Michael Venus	6–3, 6–7^{(5–7)}, [10–6]
Win	9–13	Jun 2025	Eastbourne International, United Kingdom	250 Series	Grass	(United Kingdom) Julian Cash	(Uruguay) Ariel Behar (Belgium) Joran Vliegen	6–4, 7–6^{(7–5)}
Win	10–13	Jul 2025	Wimbledon Championships, United Kingdom	Grand Slam	Grass	(United Kingdom) Julian Cash	(Australia) Rinky Hijikata (Netherlands) David Pel	6–2, 7–6^{(7–3)}
Win	11–13	Aug 2025	Canadian Open, Canada	Masters 1000	Hard	(United Kingdom) Julian Cash	(United Kingdom) Joe Salisbury (United Kingdom) Neal Skupski	6–3, 6–7^{(5–7)}, [13–11]
Win	12–13	Oct 2025	Vienna Open, Austria	500 Series	Hard (i)	(United Kingdom) Julian Cash	(Portugal) Francisco Cabral (Austria) Lucas Miedler	6–1, 7–6^{(8–6)}
Loss	12–14	Nov 2025	Paris Masters, France	Masters 1000	Hard (i)	(United Kingdom) Julian Cash	(Finland) Harri Heliövaara (United Kingdom) Henry Patten	3–6, 4–6
Loss	12–15	Jan 2026	Brisbane International, Australia	250 Series	Hard	(United Kingdom) Julian Cash	(Portugal) Francisco Cabral (Austria) Lucas Miedler	3–6, 6–3, [8–10]
Loss	12–16	Feb 2026	Qatar Open, Qatar	500 Series	Hard	(United Kingdom) Julian Cash	(Finland) Harri Heliövaara (United Kingdom) Henry Patten	3–6, 3–6
Win	13–16	Apr 2026	Barcelona Open, Spain	500 Series	Clay	(United Kingdom) Julian Cash	(France) Pierre-Hugues Herbert (Italy) Andrea Vavassori	6–3, 6–4
Win	14–16	Aug 2026	Washington Open, United States	500 Series	Hard	(United Kingdom) Julian Cash	(United States) Austin Krajicek (Croatia) Nikola Mektić	6–3, 6–4
Win	15–16	Oct 2026	China Open, China	500 Series	Hard	(United Kingdom) Julian Cash	(Netherlands) Sander Arends (Netherlands) David Pel	6–3, 3–6, [10–6]
Win	16–16	Oct 2026	ATP Lyon Open, France	250 Series	Hard (i)	(United Kingdom) Julian Cash	(France) Théo Arribagé (France) Albano Olivetti	4–6, 6–3, [10–8]

== Challengers and Futures finals ==
=== Singles: 11 (5–6) ===
Legend ATP Challenger Tour (0–0) ITF Futures Tour (5–6)	Finals by surface Hard (5–5) Clay (0–0) Grass (0–0) Carpet (0–1)

Result	W–L	Date	Tournament	Tier	Surface	Opponent	Score
Loss	0–1	Jul 2015	Ireland F1, Dublin	Futures	Carpet	(United Kingdom) Daniel Smethurst	3–6, 6–7^{(2–7)}
Win	1–1	Oct 2015	Greece F7, Heraklion	Futures	Hard	(Serbia) Miki Janković	6–4, 6–3
Loss	1–2	Nov 2015	Great Britain F10, Tipton	Futures	Hard (i)	(United Kingdom) Neil Pauffley	4–6, 6–7^{(8–10)}
Win	2–2	Dec 2015	Tunisia F34, El Kantaoui	Futures	Hard	(Spain) Roberto Ortega Olmedo	6–3, 6–4
Loss	2–3	Mar 2016	Canada F2, Sherbrooke	Futures	Hard (i)	(United States) Stefan Kozlov	6–4, 4–6, 4–6
Loss	2–4	Apr 2016	Greece F4, Heraklion	Futures	Hard	(Belgium) Yannick Mertens	2–6, 5–7
Win	3–4	Apr 2016	Greece F5, Heraklion	Futures	Hard	(United Kingdom) Jonny O'Mara	6–3, 4–6, 7–6^{(7–3)}
Win	4–4	Sep 2017	Great Britain F4, Nottingham	Futures	Hard	(United Kingdom) Oliver Golding	5–7, 6–4, 6–4
Win	5–4	Jul 2018	USA F19B, Iowa City	Futures	Hard	(Russia) Evgeny Karlovskiy	7–6^{(7–2)}, 7–6^{(7–1)}
Loss	5–5	Sep 2018	Canada F7, Toronto	Futures	Hard	(United States) Nick Chappell	2–6, 0–6
Loss	5–6	May 2019	M15 Heraklion	Futures	Hard	(Israel) Yshai Oliel	3–6, 4–6

=== Doubles: 32 (16–16) ===
Legend ATP Challenger Tour (5–10) ITF Futures Tour (11–6)	Finals by surface Hard (13–11) Clay (3–3) Grass (0–0) Carpet (0–2)

Result	W–L	Date	Tournament	Tier	Surface	Partner	Opponents	Score
Win	1–0	Aug 2015	Finland F2, Hyvinkää	Futures	Clay	(Denmark) Mikael Torpegaard	(Monaco) Romain Arneodo (France) Maxime Janvier	7–6^{(7–3)}, 6–2
Win	2–0	Sep 2015	Great Britain F9, Nottingham	Futures	Hard	(United Kingdom) Joshua Ward-Hibbert	(United Kingdom) Daniel Cox (United Kingdom) David Rice	6–4, 3–6, [10–7]
Loss	2–1	Sep 2015	Spain F30, Sevilla	Futures	Clay	(United Kingdom) Joshua Ward-Hibbert	(Italy) Marco Bortolotti (Spain) Juan Lizariturry	3–6, 4–6
Win	3–1	Oct 2015	Greece F7, Heraklion	Futures	Hard	(United Kingdom) Joshua Ward-Hibbert	(Republic of Ireland) Peter Bothwell (United Kingdom) Toby Martin	6–3, 7–5
Win	4–1	Oct 2015	Greece F8, Heraklion	Futures	Hard	(United Kingdom) Joshua Ward-Hibbert	(France) Corentin Denolly (France) Alexandre Müller	Walkover
Loss	4–2	Nov 2015	Great Britain F10, Tipton	Futures	Hard (i)	(United Kingdom) Joshua Ward-Hibbert	(United Kingdom) Billy Harris (United Kingdom) Evan Hoyt	6–4, 3–6, [9–11]
Win	5–2	Nov 2015	Great Britain F11, Bath	Futures	Hard (i)	(United Kingdom) Joshua Ward-Hibbert	(Republic of Ireland) Sam Barry (Canada) Filip Peliwo	6–4, 3–6, [10–2]
Win	6–2	Dec 2015	Tunisia F35, El Kantaoui	Futures	Hard	(Republic of Ireland) Peter Bothwell	(Tunisia) Anis Ghorbel (Bulgaria) Vasko Mladenov	6–1, 6–4
Loss	6–3	Feb 2016	Great Britain F2, Sunderland	Futures	Hard (i)	(United Kingdom) Joshua Ward-Hibbert	(Italy) Andrea Vavassori (Germany) George Von Massow	5–7, 3–6
Loss	6–4	Mar 2016	Drummondville, Canada	Challenger	Hard (i)	(United Kingdom) Dan Evans	(United States) James Cerretani (United States) Max Schnur	6–3, 3–6, [9–11]
Loss	6–5	Apr 2016	Greece F4, Heraklion	Futures	Hard	(United Kingdom) Edward Corrie	(Ukraine) Vladyslav Manafov (Australia) Bradley Mousley	2–6, 3–6
Win	7–5	Apr 2017	USA F12, Memphis	Futures	Hard	(United States) Mackenzie McDonald	(Canada) Philip Bester (United States) Alex Lawson	6–2, 7–6^{(7–3)}
Loss	7–6	Jul 2017	Ireland F1, Dublin	Futures	Hard	(Republic of Ireland) Peter Bothwell	(United Kingdom) Scott Clayton (United Kingdom) Jonny O'Mara	1–6, 3–6
Loss	7–7	Jan 2019	M25 Tucson	Futures	Hard	(United Kingdom) Evan Hoyt	(Tunisia) Aziz Dougaz (France) Manuel Guinard	4–6, 7–5, [3–10]
Win	8–7	May 2019	M15 Heraklion	Futures	Hard	(United Kingdom) Aidan McHugh	(Greece) Michail Pervolarakis (Greece) Petros Tsitsipas	7–6^{(7–5)}, 7–6^{(7–2)}
Win	9–7	Jul 2019	M25 Iowa City	Futures	Hard	(Colombia) Alejandro González	(United Kingdom) Jack Findel-Hawkins (United Kingdom) Mark Whitehouse	6–2, 6–1
Win	10–7	Oct 2019	M25 Norman	Futures	Hard	(United States) Sekou Bangoura	(United States) Hunter Johnson (United States) Yates Johnson	7–6^{(11–9)}, 6–2
Win	11–7	Jan 2020	M25 Rancho Santa Fe	Futures	Hard	(United States) Alex Lawson	(Bolivia) Boris Arias (United States) Sekou Bangoura	6–1, 7–6^{(7–1)}
Loss	11–8	Feb 2020	Columbus, United States	Challenger	Hard	(United States) Alex Lawson	(Philippines) Treat Huey (United States) Nathaniel Lammons	6–7^{(3–7)}, 6–7^{(4–7)}
Loss	11–9	Oct 2020	Biella, Italy	Challenger	Clay	(United States) Alex Lawson	(Finland) Harri Heliövaara (Poland) Szymon Walków	5–7, 3–6
Loss	11–10	Oct 2020	Ismaning, Germany	Challenger	Hard (i)	(United States) Alex Lawson	(Germany) Andre Begemann (Netherlands) David Pel	7–5, 6–7^{(2–7)}, [4–10]
Loss	11–11	Oct 2020	Hamburg, Germany	Challenger	Hard (i)	(United States) Alex Lawson	(Switzerland) Marc-Andrea Hüsler (Poland) Kamil Majchrzak	3–6, 6–1, [18–20]
Loss	11–12	Nov 2020	Eckental, Germany	Challenger	Carpet	(United States) Alex Lawson	(Germany) Dustin Brown (France) Antoine Hoang	7–6^{(10–8)}, 5–7, [11–13]
Loss	11–13	Nov 2020	Maia, Portugal	Challenger	Clay	(Finland) Harri Heliövaara	(Czech Republic) Zdeněk Kolář (Italy) Andrea Vavassori	3–6, 4–6
Loss	11–14	Jan 2021	Istanbul, Turkey	Challenger	Hard (i)	(Finland) Harri Heliövaara	(Sweden) André Göransson (Netherlands) David Pel	6–4, 3–6, [8–10]
Loss	11–15	Feb 2021	Biella, Italy	Challenger	Hard (i)	(Finland) Harri Heliövaara	(Monaco) Hugo Nys (Germany) Tim Pütz	6–7^{(4–7)}, 3–6
Win	12–15	Feb 2021	Las Palmas, Spain	Challenger	Clay	(Finland) Harri Heliövaara	(Belgium) Kimmer Coppejans (Spain) Sergio Martos Gornés	7–5, 6–1
Win	13–15	Mar 2021	Biella, Italy	Challenger	Hard (i)	(Australia) Matt Reid	(Ukraine) Denys Molchanov (Ukraine) Sergiy Stakhovsky	6–3, 6–4
Loss	13–16	Nov 2021	Bergamo, Italy	Challenger	Hard (i)	(Finland) Harri Heliövaara	(Czech Republic) Zdeněk Kolář (Czech Republic) Jiří Lehečka	4–6, 4–6
Win	14–16	Nov 2021	Roanne, France	Challenger	Hard (i)	(Finland) Harri Heliövaara	(Monaco) Romain Arneodo (France) Albano Olivetti	7–6^{(7–5)}, 6–7^{(5–7)}, [12–10]
Win	15–16	Nov 2021	Bari, Italy	Challenger	Hard	(Finland) Harri Heliövaara	(Italy) Andrea Vavassori (Spain) David Vega Hernández	6–3, 6–0
Win	16–16	May 2023	Bordeaux, France	Challenger	Clay	(Finland) Harri Heliövaara	(France) Sadio Doumbia (France) Fabien Reboul	6–4, 6–2

== See also ==
- List of male doubles tennis players
- List of ATP number 1 ranked doubles tennis players
- List of ATP Big Titles doubles champions
- List of Wimbledon gentlemen's doubles champions
- List of Grand Slam men's doubles champions
- List of Open Era Grand Slam champions by country
- List of highest ranked tennis players per country
- Great Britain Davis Cup team
