= Biella Challenger Indoor =

Indoor tennis tournament

- 2021 Biella Challenger Indoor

Defunct tennis tournament
- Event name: Biella Challenger Indoor
- Location: Biella, Italy
- Venue: Palasport Biella
- Category: ATP Challenger Tour, Challenger 125 (edition 2)
- Surface: Hard (Indoor)

The Biella Challenger Indoor is a professional tennis tournament played on indoor hardcourts. It was part of the ATP Challenger Tour. It was held in Biella, Italy in 2021 in four editions.

== Past finals ==
=== Singles ===
Year	Champion	Runner-up	Score
2021 (4)	(Germany) Daniel Masur	(Germany) Matthias Bachinger	6–3, 6–7^{(8–10)}, 7–5
2021 (3)	(Italy) Andreas Seppi	(United Kingdom) Liam Broady	6–2, 6–1
2021 (2)	(South Korea) Kwon Soon-woo	(Italy) Lorenzo Musetti	6–2, 6–3
2021 (1)	(Ukraine) Illya Marchenko	(United Kingdom) Andy Murray	6–2, 6–4

=== Doubles ===
Year	Champions	Runners-up	Score
2021 (4)	(United Kingdom) Lloyd Glasspool (Australia) Matt Reid	(Ukraine) Denys Molchanov (Ukraine) Sergiy Stakhovsky	6–3, 6–4
2021 (3)	(France) Quentin Halys (France) Tristan Lamasine	(Ukraine) Denys Molchanov (Ukraine) Sergiy Stakhovsky	6–1, 2–0 ret.
2021 (2)	(Monaco) Hugo Nys (Germany) Tim Pütz	(United Kingdom) Lloyd Glasspool (Finland) Harri Heliövaara	7–6^{(7–4)}, 6–3
2021 (1)	(Venezuela) Luis David Martínez (Spain) David Vega Hernández	(Poland) Szymon Walków (Poland) Jan Zieliński	6–4, 3–6, [10–8]
