= 2025 All In Open – Singles =

Singles
- 2025 All In Open

Final
- Champion: (Germany) Jan-Lennard Struff
- Runner-up: (United Kingdom) Liam Broady
- Score: 6–4, 6–4

Events
Singles	Doubles
← 2024 ·	All In Open	· 2026 →

Raphaël Collignon was the defending champion but chose not to defend his title.

Jan-Lennard Struff won the title after defeating Liam Broady 6–4, 6–4 in the final.

== Seeds ==
1. (Serbia) Laslo Djere (second round)
2. (Czech Republic) Vít Kopřiva (quarterfinals)
3. (Japan) Shintaro Mochizuki (first round)
4. (Australia) Tristan Schoolkate (first round)
5. (Argentina) Thiago Agustín Tirante (first round)
6. (Germany) Jan-Lennard Struff (champion)
7. (Germany) Yannick Hanfmann (second round)
8. (United Kingdom) Billy Harris (first round)

== Draw ==
Key

- Q = Qualifier
- WC = Wild card
- LL = Lucky loser
- Alt = Alternate
- ITF = ITF entry
- PR = Protected ranking
- SR = Special ranking
- SE = Special exempt
- JE = Junior exempt
- JR = Junior Accelerator Programme entrant
- CO = College Accelerator Programme entrant
- NG = Next Gen Accelerator Program entrant
- w/o = Walkover
- r = Retired
- d = Defaulted

=== Finals ===
Semifinals
WC	(France) Tom Paris	6^{5}	4
Q	(United Kingdom) Liam Broady	7^{7}	6
LL	(France) Dan Added	6	6^{5}	2
6	(Germany) Jan-Lennard Struff	1	7^{7}	6

Final
Q	(United Kingdom) Liam Broady	4	4
6	(Germany) Jan-Lennard Struff	6	6

=== Top half ===
First round
1	(Serbia) L Djere	6	5	6
(France) U Blanchet	4	7	4
(Lebanon) B Hassan	3	4
WC	(France) T Paris	6	6
Alt	(Belgium) G Onclin	3	0
(France) L Van Assche	6	6
Q	(Kazakhstan) M Kukushkin	7^{7}	7
8	(United Kingdom) B Harris	6^{2}	5
4	(Australia) T Schoolkate	5	6	4
Q	(Croatia) M Dodig	7	3	6
Alt	(France) L Pavlovic	1	5
Alt	(United Kingdom) A Fery	6	7
Q	(United Kingdom) L Broady	6	7
(Italy) F Passaro	3	5
JR	(Czech Republic) J Kumstát	1	3
7	(Germany) Y Hanfmann	6	6

Second round
1	(Serbia) L Djere	6^{5}	6^{3}
WC	(France) T Paris	7^{7}	7^{7}
(France) L Van Assche	2	6^{5}
Q	(Kazakhstan) M Kukushkin	6	7^{7}
Q	(Croatia) M Dodig	7	6
Alt	(United Kingdom) A Fery	5	3
Q	(United Kingdom) L Broady	7^{7}	6
7	(Germany) Y Hanfmann	6^{5}	4

Quarterfinals
WC	(France) T Paris	6	6
Q	(Kazakhstan) M Kukushkin	3	2
Q	(Croatia) M Dodig	3	6	4
Q	(United Kingdom) L Broady	6	2	6

Semifinals
WC	(France) T Paris	6^{5}	4
Q	(United Kingdom) L Broady	7^{7}	6

=== Bottom half ===
First round
5	(Argentina) TA Tirante	2	1
JR	(Poland) T Berkieta	6	6
(Canada) A Galarneau	4	6^{3}
LL	(France) D Added	6	7^{7}
(France) T Droguet	7^{7}	3	3
(France) K Jacquet	6^{4}	6	6
Q	(Norway) V Durasovic	6	4	6
3	(Japan) S Mochizuki	4	6	3
6	(Germany) J-L Struff	6^{5}	7^{7}	6
Q	(Kazakhstan) B Zhukayev	7^{7}	6^{1}	4
(Estonia) M Lajal	3	6	6
Q	(France) G Blancaneaux	6	1	2
WC	(France) S Gueymard Wayenburg	2	6	1
(Italy) F Maestrelli	6	1	6
WC	(France) A Géa	2	2
2	(Czech Republic) V Kopřiva	6	6

Second round
JR	(Poland) T Berkieta	4	1
LL	(France) D Added	6	6
(France) K Jacquet	6	6
Q	(Norway) V Durasovic	2	4
6	(Germany) J-L Struff	6	6
(Estonia) M Lajal	4	2
(Italy) F Maestrelli	3	3
2	(Czech Republic) V Kopřiva	6	6

Quarterfinals
LL	(France) D Added	7^{7}	4	6
(France) K Jacquet	6^{4}	6	4
6	(Germany) J-L Struff	6	6
2	(Czech Republic) V Kopřiva	1	2

Semifinals
LL	(France) D Added	6	6^{5}	2
6	(Germany) J-L Struff	1	7^{7}	6
