= 2024 All In Open – Singles =

Singles
- 2024 All In Open

Final
- Champion: (Belgium) Raphaël Collignon
- Runner-up: (France) Calvin Hemery
- Score: 6–4, 6–2

Events
Singles	Doubles
All In Open	· 2025 →

This was the first edition of the tournament.

Raphaël Collignon won the title after defeating Calvin Hemery 6–4, 6–2 in the final.

== Seeds ==
1. (Croatia) Borna Ćorić (quarterfinals)
2. (Italy) Luca Nardi (first round)
3. (Bosnia and Herzegovina) Damir Džumhur (first round)
4. (France) Harold Mayot (second round)
5. (Kazakhstan) Mikhail Kukushkin (first round)
6. (Belgium) Raphaël Collignon (champion)
7. (Brazil) João Fonseca (semifinals)
8. (France) Hugo Grenier (first round)

== Draw ==
=== Key ===
- Q = Qualifier
- WC = Wild card
- LL = Lucky loser
- Alt = Alternate
- ITF = ITF entry
- PR = Protected ranking
- SR = Special ranking
- SE = Special exempt
- JE = Junior exempt
- JR = Junior Accelerator Programme entrant
- CO = College Accelerator Programme entrant
- NG = Next Gen Accelerator Program entrant
- w/o = Walkover
- r = Retired
- d = Defaulted

=== Finals ===
Semifinals
6	(Belgium) Raphaël Collignon	7^{7}	6
(France) Grégoire Barrère	6^{4}	1
7	(Brazil) João Fonseca	6^{5}	4
(France) Calvin Hemery	7^{7}	6

Final
6	(Belgium) Raphaël Collignon	6	6
(France) Calvin Hemery	4	2

=== Top half ===
First round
1	(Croatia) B Ćorić	6^{1}	6	6
(Denmark) A Holmgren	7^{7}	3	4
Q	(Slovakia) M Karol	7	6
(Italy) S Travaglia	5	3
Q	(France) L Pavlovic	6^{3}	6	6^{2}
(Germany) H Squire	7^{7}	3	7^{7}
(France) T Droguet	6	2	2
6	(Belgium) R Collignon	4	6	6
3	(Bosnia and Herzegovina) D Džumhur	3	6^{1}
(France) V Royer	6	7^{7}
(Bulgaria) A Andreev	6^{6}	6	7
WC	(France) T Paris	7^{8}	3	5
Q	(France) Alexis Gautier	6^{5}	5
(France) G Barrère	7^{7}	7
Q	(Ukraine) V Sachko	6	6
5	(Kazakhstan) M Kukushkin	3	4

Second round
1	(Croatia) B Ćorić	7^{7}	6
Q	(Slovakia) M Karol	6^{3}	4
(Germany) H Squire	3	6	1
6	(Belgium) R Collignon	6	1	6
(France) V Royer	4	6	6
(Bulgaria) A Andreev	6	3	4
(France) G Barrère	6	6^{5}	6
Q	(Ukraine) V Sachko	1	7^{7}	4

Quarterfinals
1	(Croatia) B Ćorić	6	6^{5}	4
6	(Belgium) R Collignon	3	7^{7}	6
(France) V Royer	7^{19}	3	6^{5}
(France) G Barrère	6^{17}	6	7^{7}

Semifinals
6	(Belgium) R Collignon	7^{7}	6
(France) G Barrère	6^{4}	1

=== Bottom half ===
First round
7	(Brazil) J Fonseca	6	3	6
Q	(France) M Janvier	4	6	3
Alt	(Germany) R Molleker	1	4
WC	(France) K Jacquet	6	6
Alt	(Italy) G Mager	3	6	3
(Spain) M Landaluce	6	4	6
(Croatia) D Prižmić	4	3
4	(France) H Mayot	6	6
8	(France) H Grenier	6	6^{1}	3
Q	(Ukraine) O Prihodko	2	7^{7}	6
(France) C Hemery	3	7	7^{7}
(Kazakhstan) D Yevseyev	6	5	6^{5}
WC	(France) Loann Massard	6	6^{2}	6
Alt	(Jordan) A Shelbayh	4	7^{7}	3
(France) U Blanchet	6	7^{7}
2	(Italy) L Nardi	4	6^{5}

Second round
7	(Brazil) J Fonseca	6	6
WC	(France) K Jacquet	4	4
(Spain) M Landaluce	6	6
4	(France) H Mayot	3	4
Q	(Ukraine) O Prihodko	6	3	2
(France) C Hemery	3	6	6
WC	(France) L Massard	7^{7}	6
(France) U Blanchet	6^{2}	4

Quarterfinals
7	(Brazil) J Fonseca	6	3	7^{11}
(Spain) M Landaluce	2	6	6^{9}
(France) C Hemery	6	3	7^{7}
WC	(France) L Massard	4	6	6^{1}

Semifinals
7	(Brazil) J Fonseca	6^{5}	4
(France) C Hemery	7^{7}	6
