= 2025 All In Open – Doubles =

Doubles
- 2025 All In Open

Final
- Champions: (Ecuador) Diego Hidalgo (United States) Patrik Trhac
- Runners-up: (India) Sriram Balaji (Germany) Hendrik Jebens
- Score: 6–3, 6–4

Events
Singles	Doubles
- All In Open

Luke Johnson and Lucas Miedler were the defending champions but chose not to defend their title.

Diego Hidalgo and Patrik Trhac won the title after defeating Sriram Balaji and Hendrik Jebens 6–3, 6–4 in the final.

== Seeds ==
1. (Ecuador) Diego Hidalgo / (United States) Patrik Trhac (champions)
2. (India) Sriram Balaji / (Germany) Hendrik Jebens (final)
3. (United Kingdom) Joshua Paris / (Switzerland) Jakub Paul (quarterfinals)
4. (Austria) David Pichler / (Poland) Filip Pieczonka (first round)

== Draw ==
Key

- Q = Qualifier
- WC = Wild card
- LL = Lucky loser
- Alt = Alternate
- ITF = ITF entry
- PR = Protected ranking
- SR = Special ranking
- SE = Special exempt
- JE = Junior exempt
- JR = Junior Accelerator Programme entrant
- CO = College Accelerator Programme entrant
- NG = Next Gen Accelerator Program entrant
- w/o = Walkover
- r = Retired
- d = Defaulted

First round
1	(Ecuador) D Hidalgo (United States) P Trhac	6	6
(Spain) S Martos Gornés (Spain) D Vega Hernández	4	2
(Slovakia) M Karol (Finland) P Niklas-Salminen	3	3
(Italy) F Maestrelli (Italy) F Romano	6	6
4	(Austria) D Pichler (Poland) F Pieczonka	4	5
I Liutarevich (Italy) G Ricca	6	7
WC	(France) Timothée Lustig (France) Yoshka Sborowsky	6	3	[7]
WC	(France) M Bobichon (France) Maé Malige	3	6	[10]
(India) A Kadhe (India) VS Prashanth	7	7^{7}
(Bulgaria) A Donski (Ukraine) D Molchanov	5	6^{5}
(Romania) A Jecan (Romania) B Pavel	1	6	[6]
3	(United Kingdom) J Paris (Switzerland) J Paul	6	4	[10]
(Poland) S Kielan (Poland) S Walków	6	6
(Spain) M Mansilla Díez (Spain) B Pujol Navarro	2	3
(France) G Blancaneaux (Czech Republic) F Duda	3	4
2	(India) S Balaji (Germany) H Jebens	6	6

Quarterfinals
1	(Ecuador) D Hidalgo (United States) P Trhac	6	3	[10]
(Italy) F Maestrelli (Italy) F Romano	3	6	[6]
I Liutarevich (Italy) G Ricca	6	4	[17]
WC	(France) M Bobichon (France) M Malige	4	6	[15]
(India) A Kadhe (India) VS Prashanth	5	7^{7}	[10]
3	(United Kingdom) J Paris (Switzerland) J Paul	7	6^{5}	[5]
(Poland) S Kielan (Poland) S Walków	4	1^{r}
2	(India) S Balaji (Germany) H Jebens	6	2

Semifinals
1	(Ecuador) D Hidalgo (United States) P Trhac	7^{7}	6^{4}	[13]
I Liutarevich (Italy) G Ricca	6^{3}	7^{7}	[11]
(India) A Kadhe (India) VS Prashanth	3	5
2	(India) S Balaji (Germany) H Jebens	6	7

Final
1	(Ecuador) D Hidalgo (United States) P Trhac	6	6
2	(India) S Balaji (Germany) H Jebens	3	4
