= 2024 All In Open =

- Date: 11 – 16 November
- Edition: 1st
- Surface: Hard (indoor)
- Location: Lyon, France

Champions

Singles
- (Belgium) Raphaël Collignon

Doubles
- (United Kingdom) Luke Johnson / (Austria) Lucas Miedler
All In Open	· 2025 →

The 2024 All In Open Auvergne-Rhône-Alpes de Décines was a professional tennis tournament played on hardcourts. It was the 1st edition of the tournament which was part of the 2024 ATP Challenger Tour. It took place in Lyon, France between 11 and 16 November 2024.

== Singles main-draw entrants ==
=== Seeds ===
Country	Player	Rank^{1}	Seed
CRO	Borna Ćorić	95	1
ITA	Luca Nardi	102	2
BIH	Damir Džumhur	104	3
FRA	Harold Mayot	107	4
KAZ	Mikhail Kukushkin	108	5
BEL	Raphaël Collignon	138	6
BRA	João Fonseca	150	7
FRA	Hugo Grenier	158	8

- ^{1} Rankings are as of 4 November 2024.

=== Other entrants ===
The following players received wildcards into the singles main draw:

- (France) Kyrian Jacquet
- (France) Loann Massard
- (France) Tom Paris

The following players received entry into the singles main draw as alternates:

- (Italy) Gianluca Mager
- (Germany) Rudolf Molleker
- (Jordan) Abdullah Shelbayh

The following players received entry from the qualifying draw:

- (France) Alexis Gautier
- (France) Maxime Janvier
- (Slovakia) Miloš Karol
- (France) Luka Pavlovic
- (Ukraine) Oleg Prihodko
- (Ukraine) Vitaliy Sachko

== Champions ==
=== Singles ===
- (Belgium) Raphaël Collignon def. (France) Calvin Hemery 6–4, 6–2.

=== Doubles ===
- (United Kingdom) Luke Johnson / (Austria) Lucas Miedler def. (Spain) Sergio Martos Gornés / (Austria) David Pichler 6–1, 6–2.
