= 2024 BW Open =

- Date: 23–28 January
- Edition: 2nd
- Surface: Hard (indoor)
- Location: Ottignies-Louvain-la-Neuve, Belgium

Champions

Singles
- (Switzerland) Leandro Riedi

Doubles
- (United Kingdom) Luke Johnson / (Tunisia) Skander Mansouri
← 2023 ·	BW Open	· 2025 →

The 2024 BW Open was a professional tennis tournament played on hardcourts. It was the second edition of the tournament which was part of the 2024 ATP Challenger Tour. It took place in Ottignies-Louvain-la-Neuve, Belgium between 23 and 28 January 2024.

== Singles main-draw entrants ==
=== Seeds ===
Country	Player	Rank^{1}	Seed
CRO	Borna Ćorić	40	1
FRA	Benjamin Bonzi	106	2
~~SRB~~	~~Hamad Medjedovic~~	~~108~~	~~3~~
AUT	Jurij Rodionov	111	4
BEL	David Goffin	112	5
FRA	Benoît Paire	115	6
HUN	Zsombor Piros	126	7
USA	Brandon Nakashima	127	8

- ^{1} Rankings are as of 15 January 2024.

=== Other entrants ===
The following players received wildcards into the singles main draw:

- (Belgium) Raphaël Collignon
- (Croatia) Borna Ćorić
- (Poland) Kamil Majchrzak

The following players received entry into the singles main draw as alternates:

- (Italy) Franco Agamenone
- (Belgium) Gauthier Onclin
- (Switzerland) Alexander Ritschard

The following players received entry from the qualifying draw:

- (Bulgaria) Adrian Andreev
- (Romania) Marius Copil
- Alibek Kachmazov
- (Poland) Maks Kaśnikowski
- (Switzerland) Leandro Riedi
- (Kazakhstan) Denis Yevseyev

The following player received entry as a lucky loser:

- (Germany) Henri Squire

== Champions ==
=== Singles ===
- (Switzerland) Leandro Riedi def. (Croatia) Borna Ćorić 7–5, 6–2.

=== Doubles ===
- (United Kingdom) Luke Johnson / (Tunisia) Skander Mansouri def. (Netherlands) Sander Arends / (Netherlands) Sem Verbeek 7–5, 6–3.
