= 2024 BW Open – Doubles =

Doubles
- 2024 BW Open

Final
- Champions: (United Kingdom) Luke Johnson (Tunisia) Skander Mansouri
- Runners-up: (Netherlands) Sander Arends (Netherlands) Sem Verbeek
- Score: 7–5, 6–3

Events
Singles	Doubles
← 2023 ·	BW Open	· 2025 →

Romain Arneodo and Sam Weissborn were the defending champions but chose not to defend their title.

Luke Johnson and Skander Mansouri won the title after defeating Sander Arends and Sem Verbeek 7–5, 6–3 in the final.

== Seeds ==
1. (France) Jonathan Eysseric / (United States) Evan King (first round)
2. (Czech Republic) Petr Nouza / (Netherlands) Bart Stevens (first round)
3. (Czech Republic) Roman Jebavý / (Austria) Philipp Oswald (quarterfinals)
4. (Italy) Marco Bortolotti / (Spain) Sergio Martos Gornés (quarterfinals)

== Draw ==
Key

- Q = Qualifier
- WC = Wild card
- LL = Lucky loser
- Alt = Alternate
- ITF = ITF entry
- PR = Protected ranking
- SR = Special ranking
- SE = Special exempt
- JE = Junior exempt
- JR = Junior Accelerator Programme entrant
- CO = College Accelerator Programme entrant
- NG = Next Gen Accelerator Program entrant
- w/o = Walkover
- r = Retired
- d = Defaulted

First round
1	(France) J Eysseric (United States) E King	4	6	[4]
(Brazil) R Matos (Brazil) F Meligeni Alves	6	3	[10]
(Serbia) I Sabanov (Serbia) M Sabanov	6	3	[10]
WC	(Belgium) Simon Beaupain (Belgium) Jack Loge	4	6	[4]
4	(Italy) M Bortolotti (Spain) S Martos Gornés	6^{5}	6	[10]
(South Africa) L Harris (Switzerland) L Margaroli	7^{7}	4	[1]
(United Kingdom) L Johnson (Tunisia) S Mansouri	6	6
WC	(Belgium) R Collignon (Belgium) M Geerts	2	4
(Brazil) F Romboli (Spain) D Vega Hernández	5	6^{6}
(Netherlands) S Arends (Netherlands) S Verbeek	7	7^{8}
(Sweden) F Bergevi (Netherlands) M Veldheer	6	3	[7]
3	(Czech Republic) R Jebavý (Austria) P Oswald	2	6	[10]
Alt	(Switzerland) M-A Hüsler (Switzerland) L Riedi	2	6	[10]
2	(Czech Republic) P Nouza (Netherlands) B Stevens	6	1	[4]

Quarterfinals
(Brazil) R Matos (Brazil) F Meligeni Alves	6	7
(Serbia) I Sabanov (Serbia) M Sabanov	4	5
4	(Italy) M Bortolotti (Spain) S Martos Gornés	3	4
(United Kingdom) L Johnson (Tunisia) S Mansouri	6	6
(Netherlands) S Arends (Netherlands) S Verbeek	4	6	[11]
3	(Czech Republic) R Jebavý (Austria) P Oswald	6	3	[9]
I Liutarevich (Ukraine) V Manafov	3	6	[5]
Alt	(Switzerland) M-A Hüsler (Switzerland) L Riedi	6	3	[10]

Semifinals
(Brazil) R Matos (Brazil) F Meligeni Alves	6	3	[5]
(United Kingdom) L Johnson (Tunisia) S Mansouri	4	6	[10]
(Netherlands) S Arends (Netherlands) S Verbeek	6	3	[14]
Alt	(Switzerland) M-A Hüsler (Switzerland) L Riedi	4	6	[12]

Final
(United Kingdom) L Johnson (Tunisia) S Mansouri	7	6
(Netherlands) S Arends (Netherlands) S Verbeek	5	3
