= 2024 ATP Lyon Open – Doubles =

Doubles
- 2024 ATP Lyon Open

Final
- Champions: (Finland) Harri Heliövaara (United Kingdom) Henry Patten
- Runners-up: (India) Yuki Bhambri (France) Albano Olivetti
- Score: 3–6, 7–6^{(7–4)}, [10–8]

Events
Singles	Doubles
- ATP Lyon Open

Harri Heliövaara and Henry Patten defeated Yuki Bhambri and Albano Olivetti in the final, 3–6, 7–6^{(7–4)}, [10–8] to win the doubles tennis title at the 2024 ATP Lyon Open. They saved a championship point en route to the title.

Rajeev Ram and Joe Salisbury were the reigning champions, but withdrew before the start of the tournament.

== Seeds ==
1. (Mexico) Santiago González / (France) Édouard Roger-Vasselin (semifinals)
2. (Argentina) Máximo González / (Argentina) Andrés Molteni (semifinals)
3. (Belgium) Sander Gillé / (Belgium) Joran Vliegen (first round)
4. (France) Sadio Doumbia / (France) Fabien Reboul (first round)

== Draw ==
Key

- Q = Qualifier
- WC = Wild card
- LL = Lucky loser
- Alt = Alternate
- ITF = ITF entry
- PR = Protected ranking
- SR = Special ranking
- SE = Special exempt
- JE = Junior exempt
- JR = Junior Accelerator Programme entrant
- CO = College Accelerator Programme entrant
- NG = Next Gen Accelerator Program entrant
- w/o = Walkover
- r = Retired
- d = Defaulted

=== Draw ===
First round
1	(Mexico) S González (France) É Roger-Vasselin	6	6
WC	(France) T Lamasine (France) T Paris	4	3
(Colombia) N Barrientos (Portugal) F Cabral	4	6	[10]
(Netherlands) R Haase (Netherlands) S Verbeek	6	3	[5]
4	(France) S Doumbia (France) F Reboul	6	1	[5]
(India) Y Bhambri (France) A Olivetti	2	6	[10]
(United Kingdom) L Johnson (Tunisia) S Mansouri	5	6	[7]
(Netherlands) S Arends (Netherlands) M Middelkoop	7	3	[10]
(Italy) L Darderi (Brazil) F Romboli	6	3	[10]
Alt	(France) T Arribagé (Romania) VV Cornea	4	6	[7]
(Finland) H Heliövaara (United Kingdom) H Patten	7^{7}	6
3	(Belgium) S Gillé (Belgium) J Vliegen	6^{3}	2
(Ecuador) D Hidalgo (Australia) J Peers	6	7^{7}
WC	(France) J Eysseric (France) F Martin	3	6^{4}
(United States) E King (Ukraine) D Molchanov	3	3
2	(Argentina) M González (Argentina) A Molteni	6	6

Quarterfinals
1	(Mexico) S González (France) É Roger-Vasselin	6	7^{7}
(Colombia) N Barrientos (Portugal) F Cabral	4	6^{4}
(India) Y Bhambri (France) A Olivetti	6	7^{7}
(Netherlands) S Arends (Netherlands) M Middelkoop	3	6^{4}
(Italy) L Darderi (Brazil) F Romboli	3	7^{7}	[7]
(Finland) H Heliövaara (United Kingdom) H Patten	6	6^{5}	[10]
(Ecuador) D Hidalgo (Australia) J Peers	6	1	[10]
2	(Argentina) M González (Argentina) A Molteni	4	6	[12]

Semifinals
1	(Mexico) S González (France) É Roger-Vasselin	3	7^{7}	[7]
(India) Y Bhambri (France) A Olivetti	6	6^{5}	[10]
(Finland) H Heliövaara (United Kingdom) H Patten	7^{11}	6
2	(Argentina) M González (Argentina) A Molteni	6^{9}	2

Final
(India) Y Bhambri (France) A Olivetti	6	6^{4}	[8]
(Finland) H Heliövaara (United Kingdom) H Patten	3	7^{7}	[10]
