= 2024 BW Open – Singles =

Singles
- 2024 BW Open

Final
- Champion: (Switzerland) Leandro Riedi
- Runner-up: (Croatia) Borna Ćorić
- Score: 7–5, 6–2

Events
Singles	Doubles
← 2023 ·	BW Open	· 2025 →

David Goffin was the defending champion but lost in the second round to Abdullah Shelbayh.

Leandro Riedi won the title after defeating Borna Ćorić 7–5, 6–2 in the final.

== Seeds ==
1. (Croatia) Borna Ćorić (final)
2. (France) Benjamin Bonzi (first round)
3. (Serbia) Hamad Medjedovic (withdrew)
4. (Austria) Jurij Rodionov (first round)
5. (Belgium) David Goffin (second round)
6. (France) Benoît Paire (first round)
7. (Hungary) Zsombor Piros (second round)
8. (United States) Brandon Nakashima (semifinals)

== Draw ==
=== Key ===
- Q = Qualifier
- WC = Wild card
- LL = Lucky loser
- Alt = Alternate
- SE = Special exempt
- PR = Protected ranking
- ITF = ITF entry
- JE = Junior exempt
- w/o = Walkover
- r = Retired
- d = Defaulted
- SR = Special ranking

=== Finals ===
Semifinals
1/WC	(Croatia) Borna Ćorić	7	7^{7}
(Bosnia and Herzegovina) Damir Džumhur	5	6^{5}
Q	(Switzerland) Leandro Riedi	6	6
8	(United States) Brandon Nakashima	2	4

Final
1/WC	(Croatia) Borna Ćorić	5	2
Q	(Switzerland) Leandro Riedi	7	6

=== Top half ===
First round
1/WC	(Croatia) B Ćorić	7	5	6
(Brazil) F Meligeni Alves	5	7	2
WC	(Poland) K Majchrzak	6	4	6
Q	(Poland) M Kaśnikowski	4	6	3
Alt	(Italy) F Agamenone	4	3
(Jordan) A Shelbayh	6	6
(Belgium) Z Bergs	7^{7}	3	5
5	(Belgium) D Goffin	6^{5}	6	7
LL	(Germany) H Squire	3	6	7^{7}
(Belgium) A Blockx	6	4	6^{4}
(South Africa) L Harris	6^{4}	7^{9}	0
Q	(Romania) M Copil	7^{7}	6^{7}	6
Q	A Kachmazov	7^{7}	3	0^{r}
(Bosnia and Herzegovina) D Džumhur	6^{4}	6	1
(Belgium) J De Loore	3	5
7	(Hungary) Z Piros	6	7

Second round
1/WC	(Croatia) B Ćorić	7^{7}	3	6
WC	(Poland) K Majchrzak	6^{4}	6	3
(Jordan) A Shelbayh	6	6
5	(Belgium) D Goffin	3	4
LL	(Germany) H Squire	6	6
Q	(Romania) M Copil	2	2
(Bosnia and Herzegovina) D Džumhur	6	6
7	(Hungary) Z Piros	3	4

Quarterfinals
1/WC	(Croatia) B Ćorić	6	7^{7}
(Jordan) A Shelbayh	2	6^{4}
LL	(Germany) H Squire	4	5
(Bosnia and Herzegovina) D Džumhur	6	7

Semifinals
1/WC	(Croatia) B Ćorić	7	7^{7}
(Bosnia and Herzegovina) D Džumhur	5	6^{5}

=== Bottom half ===
First round
6	(France) B Paire	6	0	1
Q	(Switzerland) L Riedi	3	6	6
Q	(Kazakhstan) D Yevseyev	4	4
Alt	(Belgium) G Onclin	6	6
(Italy) R Brancaccio	0	4
Alt	(Switzerland) A Ritschard	6	6
(Switzerland) M-A Hüsler	6	6
4	(Austria) J Rodionov	2	3
8	(United States) B Nakashima	6	6
(Germany) B Hassan	3	4
WC	(Belgium) R Collignon	6	6
(Germany) R Molleker	1	1
(France) A Escoffier	3	6^{6}
(United Kingdom) J Choinski	6	7^{8}
Q	(Bulgaria) A Andreev	6	4	6
2	(France) B Bonzi	4	6	3

Second round
Q	(Switzerland) L Riedi	7	6
Alt	(Belgium) G Onclin	5	3
Alt	(Switzerland) A Ritschard	2	1
(Switzerland) M-A Hüsler	6	6
8	(United States) B Nakashima	6	6
WC	(Belgium) R Collignon	3	2
(United Kingdom) J Choinski	7^{8}	6
Q	(Bulgaria) A Andreev	6^{6}	1

Quarterfinals
Q	(Switzerland) L Riedi	7^{8}	7^{17}
(Switzerland) M-A Hüsler	6^{6}	6^{15}
8	(United States) B Nakashima	6	6^{5}	7
(United Kingdom) J Choinski	1	7^{7}	5

Semifinals
Q	(Switzerland) L Riedi	6	6
8	(United States) B Nakashima	2	4
