= 2023 BW Open =

- Date: 24–29 January
- Edition: 1st
- Surface: Hard (indoor)
- Location: Ottignies-Louvain-la-Neuve, Belgium

Champions

Singles
- (Belgium) David Goffin

Doubles
- (Monaco) Romain Arneodo / (Austria) Sam Weissborn
BW Open	· 2024 →

The 2023 BW Open was a professional tennis tournament played on hardcourts. It was the first edition of the tournament which was part of the 2023 ATP Challenger Tour. It took place in Ottignies-Louvain-la-Neuve, Belgium between 24 and 29 January 2023.

== Singles main-draw entrants ==
=== Seeds ===
Country	Player	Rank^{1}	Seed
BEL	David Goffin	50	1
~~GER~~	~~Oscar Otte~~	~~74~~	~~2~~
FRA	Ugo Humbert	106	3
CZE	Tomáš Macháč	110	4
AUT	Jurij Rodionov	122	5
SWE	Elias Ymer	124	6
CRO	Borna Gojo	125	7
GER	Yannick Hanfmann	128	8

- ^{1} Rankings are as of 16 January 2023.

=== Other entrants ===
The following players received wildcards into the singles main draw:

- (Belgium) Raphaël Collignon
- (Belgium) David Goffin
- (Monaco) Valentin Vacherot

The following players received entry into the singles main draw as alternates:

- (Belgium) Kimmer Coppejans
- (Croatia) Nino Serdarušić

The following players received entry from the qualifying draw:

- (Italy) Andrea Arnaboldi
- (Belgium) Tibo Colson
- (Belgium) Joris De Loore
- (France) Kenny de Schepper
- (Belgium) Gauthier Onclin
- (Sweden) Mikael Ymer

The following players received entry as lucky losers:

- (Turkey) Altuğ Çelikbilek
- (Latvia) Ernests Gulbis
- (Turkey) Cem İlkel
- Alibek Kachmazov

== Champions ==
=== Singles ===
- (Belgium) David Goffin def. (Sweden) Mikael Ymer 6–4, 6–1.

=== Doubles ===
- (Monaco) Romain Arneodo / (Austria) Sam Weissborn def. (Czech Republic) Roman Jebavý / (Czech Republic) Adam Pavlásek 6–4, 6–3.
