= 2023 BW Open – Doubles =

Doubles
- 2023 BW Open

Final
- Champions: (Monaco) Romain Arneodo (Austria) Sam Weissborn
- Runners-up: (Czech Republic) Roman Jebavý (Czech Republic) Adam Pavlásek
- Score: 6–4, 6–3

Events
Singles	Doubles
BW Open	· 2024 →

This was the first edition of the tournament.

Romain Arneodo and Sam Weissborn won the title after defeating Roman Jebavý and Adam Pavlásek 6–4, 6–3 in the final.

== Seeds ==
1. (Netherlands) Sander Arends / (Netherlands) David Pel (semifinals)
2. (Czech Republic) Roman Jebavý / (Czech Republic) Adam Pavlásek (final)
3. (Serbia) Ivan Sabanov / (Serbia) Matej Sabanov (first round)
4. (Monaco) Romain Arneodo / (Austria) Sam Weissborn (champions)

== Draw ==
=== Key ===
- Q = Qualifier
- WC = Wild card
- LL = Lucky loser
- Alt = Alternate
- SE = Special exempt
- PR = Protected ranking
- ITF = ITF entry
- JE = Junior exempt
- w/o = Walkover
- r = Retired
- d = Defaulted
- SR = Special ranking

First round
1	(Netherlands) S Arends (Netherlands) D Pel	6	6
Alt	(Belgium) R Bemelmans (Belgium) Y Mertens	3	2
(Slovakia) L Klein (Slovakia) J Kovalík	7	6
Alt	(Portugal) F Ferreira Silva (Turkey) E Kırkın	5	4
4	(Monaco) R Arneodo (Austria) S Weissborn	6	7^{7}
(Norway) V Durasovic (Japan) K Uchida	4	6^{2}
(Kazakhstan) G Lomakin; A Shevchenko	6	4	[10]
WC	(France) A Bouquier (Monaco) V Vacherot	3	6	[5]
(United Kingdom) C Broom (Germany) C Frantzen	7^{12}	4	[7]
(Belgium) M Geerts (India) R Ramanathan	6^{10}	6	[10]
(Jamaica) D Brown (Germany) Y Hanfmann	6	7
3	(Serbia) I Sabanov (Serbia) M Sabanov	3	5
(Italy) M Bortolotti (Croatia) F Škugor	6	6
(Finland) P Niklas-Salminen (Netherlands) B Stevens	4	4
I Liutarevich (Zimbabwe) CJ Lock	4	6	[2]
2	(Czech Republic) R Jebavý (Czech Republic) A Pavlásek	6	2	[10]

Quarterfinals
1	(Netherlands) S Arends (Netherlands) D Pel	6	3	[11]
(Slovakia) L Klein (Slovakia) J Kovalík	3	6	[9]
4	(Monaco) R Arneodo (Austria) S Weissborn	6	6
(Kazakhstan) G Lomakin; A Shevchenko	2	4
(Belgium) M Geerts (India) R Ramanathan	3	4
(Jamaica) D Brown (Germany) Y Hanfmann	6	6
(Italy) M Bortolotti (Croatia) F Škugor	1	4
2	(Czech Republic) R Jebavý (Czech Republic) A Pavlásek	6	6

Semifinals
1	(Netherlands) S Arends (Netherlands) D Pel	5	6	[7]
4	(Monaco) R Arneodo (Austria) S Weissborn	7	3	[10]
(Jamaica) D Brown (Germany) Y Hanfmann	5	4
2	(Czech Republic) R Jebavý (Czech Republic) A Pavlásek	7	6

Final
4	(Monaco) R Arneodo (Austria) S Weissborn	6	6
2	(Czech Republic) R Jebavý (Czech Republic) A Pavlásek	4	3
