= 2024 ATP Lyon Open =

Tennis competition

- Date: 18–25 May
- Edition: 7th
- Category: ATP Tour 250
- Draw: 28S/16Q/16D
- Prize money: €562,815
- Surface: Clay / outdoor
- Location: Lyon, France
- Venue: Vélodrome Georges Préveral, Parc de la Tête d'or

Champions

Singles
- (France) Giovanni Mpetshi Perricard

Doubles
- (Finland) Harri Heliövaara / (United Kingdom) Henry Patten
- ATP Lyon Open

The 2024 ATP Lyon Open (also known as the Open Parc Auvergne-Rhône-Alpes Lyon) was a men's tennis tournament played on outdoor clay courts. It was the 7th edition of the Lyon Open and part of the ATP Tour 250 series of the 2024 ATP Tour. It took place in the city of Lyon, France, from 18 to 25 May 2024.

== Champions ==
=== Singles ===
- (France) Giovanni Mpetshi Perricard def. (Argentina) Tomás Martín Etcheverry, 6–4, 1–6, 7–6^{(9–7)}

=== Doubles ===
- (Finland) Harri Heliövaara / (United Kingdom) Henry Patten def. (India) Yuki Bhambri / (France) Albano Olivetti 3–6, 7–6^{(7–4)}, [10–8]

== Points and prize money ==
=== Point distribution ===
Event	W	F	SF	QF	Round of 16	Round of 32	Q	Q2	Q1
Singles	250	165	100	50	25	0	13	7	0
Doubles	250	150	90	45	0	—N/a	—N/a	—N/a	—N/a

=== Prize money ===
Event	W	F	SF	QF	Round of 16	Round of 32	Q2	Q1
Singles	€88,125	€51,400	€30,220	€17,510	€10,165	€6,215	€3,105	€1,695
Doubles*	€30,610	€16,380	€9,600	€5,370	€3,160	—N/a	—N/a	—N/a

_{*per team}

== Singles main draw entrants ==
=== Seeds ===
Country	Player	Rank^{1}	Seed
FRA	Ugo Humbert	15	1
KAZ	Alexander Bublik	17	2
FRA	Adrian Mannarino	21	3
ARG	Francisco Cerúndolo	22	4
USA	Frances Tiafoe	25	5
ARG	Tomás Martín Etcheverry	28	6
~~ARG~~	~~Mariano Navone~~	~~31~~	~~7~~
~~FRA~~	~~Gaël Monfils~~	~~38~~	~~8~~

- Rankings are as of 6 May 2024.

=== Other entrants ===
The following players received wildcards into the singles main draw:

- (France) Richard Gasquet
- (France) Giovanni Mpetshi Perricard
- (France) Alexandre Müller

The following players received entry from the qualifying draw:

- (Japan) Taro Daniel
- (Colombia) Daniel Elahi Galán
- (France) Hugo Gaston
- (Spain) Nikolás Sánchez Izquierdo

The following players received entry as lucky losers:

- (Spain) Javier Barranco Cosano
- (Argentina) Pedro Cachín
- (Germany) Sebastian Fanselow

=== Withdrawals ===
- (Canada) Félix Auger-Aliassime → replaced by (Japan) Yoshihito Nishioka
- (Portugal) Nuno Borges → replaced by (United States) Mackenzie McDonald
- (France) Arthur Fils → replaced by (Spain) Jaume Munar
- (France) Gaël Monfils → replaced by (Germany) Sebastian Fanselow
- (Argentina) Mariano Navone → replaced by (Spain) Javier Barranco Cosano
- (Chile) Alejandro Tabilo → replaced by (France) Arthur Rinderknech
- (China) Zhang Zhizhen → replaced by (Argentina) Pedro Cachín

== Doubles main draw entrants ==
=== Seeds ===
Country	Player	Country	Player	Rank^{1}	Seed
MEX	Santiago González	FRA	Édouard Roger-Vasselin	23	1
ARG	Máximo González	ARG	Andrés Molteni	33	2
BEL	Sander Gillé	BEL	Joran Vliegen	38	3
FRA	Sadio Doumbia	FRA	Fabien Reboul	63	4

- Rankings are as of 6 May 2024.

=== Other entrants ===
The following pairs received wildcards into the doubles main draw:

- (France) Jonathan Eysseric / (France) Fabrice Martin
- (France) Tristan Lamasine / (France) Tom Paris

The following pair received entry as alternates:

- (France) Théo Arribagé / (Romania) Victor Vlad Cornea

=== Withdrawals ===
- (United States) William Blumberg / (Australia) John Peers → replaced by (Ecuador) Diego Hidalgo / (Australia) John Peers
- (Spain) Roberto Carballés Baena / (Spain) Pedro Martínez → replaced by (France) Théo Arribagé / (Romania) Victor Vlad Cornea
- (Ecuador) Diego Hidalgo / (Chile) Alejandro Tabilo → replaced by (Italy) Luciano Darderi / (Brazil) Fernando Romboli
- (Ukraine) Denys Molchanov / (Australia) John-Patrick Smith → replaced by (United States) Evan King / (Ukraine) Denys Molchanov
- (United States) Rajeev Ram / (United Kingdom) Joe Salisbury → replaced by (United Kingdom) Luke Johnson / (Tunisia) Skander Mansouri
