= 2024 All In Open – Doubles =

Doubles
- 2024 All In Open

Final
- Champions: (United Kingdom) Luke Johnson (Austria) Lucas Miedler
- Runners-up: (Spain) Sergio Martos Gornés (Austria) David Pichler
- Score: 6–1, 6–2

Events
Singles	Doubles
- All In Open

This was the first edition of the tournament.

Luke Johnson and Lucas Miedler won the title after defeating Sergio Martos Gornés and David Pichler 6–1, 6–2 in the final.

== Seeds ==
1. (United Kingdom) Luke Johnson / (Austria) Lucas Miedler (champions)
2. (Germany) Jakob Schnaitter / (Germany) Mark Wallner (quarterfinals)
3. (Monaco) Romain Arneodo / (Romania) Victor Vlad Cornea (first round)
4. (India) Rithvik Choudary Bollipalli / (Portugal) Francisco Cabral (first round)

== Draw ==
Key

- Q = Qualifier
- WC = Wild card
- LL = Lucky loser
- Alt = Alternate
- ITF = ITF entry
- PR = Protected ranking
- SR = Special ranking
- SE = Special exempt
- JE = Junior exempt
- JR = Junior Accelerator Programme entrant
- CO = College Accelerator Programme entrant
- NG = Next Gen Accelerator Program entrant
- w/o = Walkover
- r = Retired
- d = Defaulted

=== Draw ===
First round
1	(United Kingdom) L Johnson (Austria) L Miedler	6	7
(Spain) D Vega Hernández (Netherlands) M Veldheer	3	5
(Slovakia) M Karol (Ukraine) V Sachko	6	6
(Italy) F Maestrelli (Italy) L Nardi	2	2
3	(Monaco) R Arneodo (Romania) V Cornea	6^{4}	6^{3}
(France) G Blancaneaux (France) L Sanchez	7^{7}	7^{7}
(Sweden) F Bergevi (Denmark) J Ingildsen	6	6
WC	(France) M Bobichon (France) Erwann Bouchet	4	4
(Italy) M Bortolotti (Finland) P Niklas-Salminen	6^{5}	6	[10]
Alt	(Bulgaria) A Andreev (Ukraine) O Prihodko	7^{7}	1	[6]
(Czech Republic) Jiří Barnat (Czech Republic) M Vocel	7^{7}	2	[10]
4	(India) RC Bollipalli (Portugal) F Cabral	6^{3}	6	[3]
(Spain) S Martos Gornés (Austria) D Pichler	7^{7}	6
WC	(France) G Barrère (France) T Droguet	6^{4}	3
(Israel) D Cukierman; I Liutarevich	2	6^{7}
2	(Germany) J Schnaitter (Germany) M Wallner	6	7^{9}

Quarterfinals
1	(United Kingdom) L Johnson (Austria) L Miedler	4	7^{8}	[10]
(Slovakia) M Karol (Ukraine) V Sachko	6	6^{6}	[3]
(France) G Blancaneaux (France) L Sanchez	3	6	[10]
(Sweden) F Bergevi (Denmark) J Ingildsen	6	3	[8]
(Italy) M Bortolotti (Finland) P Niklas-Salminen	1	3
(Czech Republic) J Barnat (Czech Republic) M Vocel	6	6
(Spain) S Martos Gornés (Austria) D Pichler	4	7^{8}	[10]
2	(Germany) J Schnaitter (Germany) M Wallner	6	6^{6}	[3]

Semifinals
1	(United Kingdom) L Johnson (Austria) L Miedler	7^{7}	7
(France) G Blancaneaux (France) L Sanchez	6^{4}	5
(Czech Republic) J Barnat (Czech Republic) M Vocel	5	3
(Spain) S Martos Gornés (Austria) D Pichler	7	6

Final
1	(United Kingdom) L Johnson (Austria) L Miedler	6	6
(Spain) S Martos Gornés (Austria) D Pichler	1	2
