= 2023 BW Open – Singles =

Singles
- 2023 BW Open

Final
- Champion: (Belgium) David Goffin
- Runner-up: (Sweden) Mikael Ymer
- Score: 6–4, 6–1

Events
Singles	Doubles
BW Open	· 2024 →

This was the first edition of the tournament.

David Goffin won the title after defeating Mikael Ymer 6–4, 6–1 in the final.

== Seeds ==
1. (Belgium) David Goffin (champion)
2. (Germany) Oscar Otte (withdrew)
3. (France) Ugo Humbert (first round)
4. (Czech Republic) Tomáš Macháč (first round)
5. (Austria) Jurij Rodionov (first round)
6. (Sweden) Elias Ymer (second round)
7. (Croatia) Borna Gojo (second round)
8. (Germany) Yannick Hanfmann (quarterfinals)

== Draw ==
=== Key ===
- Q = Qualifier
- WC = Wild card
- LL = Lucky loser
- Alt = Alternate
- SE = Special exempt
- PR = Protected ranking
- ITF = ITF entry
- JE = Junior exempt
- w/o = Walkover
- r = Retired
- d = Defaulted
- SR = Special ranking

=== Finals ===
Semifinals
1/WC	(Belgium) David Goffin	7^{7}	6
Q	(Belgium) Gauthier Onclin	6^{3}	2
LL	(Turkey) Altuğ Çelikbilek	4	4
Q	(Sweden) Mikael Ymer	6	6

Final
1/WC	(Belgium) David Goffin	6	6
Q	(Sweden) Mikael Ymer	4	1

=== Top half ===
First round
1/WC	(Belgium) D Goffin	6	6
Alt	(Belgium) K Coppejans	2	4
(Portugal) F Ferreira Silva	6	7^{7}
(Italy) R Brancaccio	0	6^{4}
(Switzerland) H Laaksonen	5	2
(Lithuania) R Berankis	7	6
Alt	(Croatia) N Serdarušić	4	5
8	(Germany) Y Hanfmann	6	7
3	(France) U Humbert	5	1
Q	(Belgium) G Onclin	7	6
(Slovakia) L Klein	4	2
LL	(Latvia) E Gulbis	6	6
(Japan) K Uchida	6	6
LL	A Kachmazov	4	4
(Slovakia) J Kovalík	6^{4}	7	6
5	(Austria) J Rodionov	7^{7}	5	4

Second round
1/WC	(Belgium) D Goffin	6	6
(Portugal) F Ferreira Silva	4	4
(Lithuania) R Berankis	1	6	1
8	(Germany) Y Hanfmann	6	3	6
Q	(Belgium) G Onclin	6^{6}	6	6
LL	(Latvia) E Gulbis	7^{8}	2	3
(Japan) K Uchida	7^{9}	6
(Slovakia) J Kovalík	6^{7}	1

Quarterfinals
1/WC	(Belgium) D Goffin	4	6	6
8	(Germany) Y Hanfmann	6	2	1
Q	(Belgium) G Onclin	6	6
(Japan) K Uchida	3	3

Semifinals
1/WC	(Belgium) D Goffin	7^{7}	6
Q	(Belgium) G Onclin	6^{3}	2

=== Bottom half ===
First round
6	(Sweden) E Ymer	6	7^{7}
Q	(France) K de Schepper	4	6^{1}
LL	(Turkey) A Çelikbilek	6	6
WC	(Monaco) V Vacherot	4	2
Q	(Belgium) J De Loore	6	3	6
Q	(Belgium) T Colson	4	6	2
(Austria) F Misolic	6	3	6
4	(Czech Republic) T Macháč	2	6	2
7	(Croatia) B Gojo	6	7^{8}
(Belgium) Z Bergs	1	6^{6}
WC	(Belgium) R Collignon	7^{7}	2	2
Q	(Sweden) M Ymer	6^{5}	6	6
Q	(Italy) A Arnaboldi	2	1
(Hungary) F Marozsán	6	6
A Shevchenko	1	7^{8}	3
LL	(Turkey) C İlkel	6	6^{6}	6

Second round
6	(Sweden) E Ymer	3	3
LL	(Turkey) A Çelikbilek	6	6
Q	(Belgium) J De Loore	6^{5}	6	5
(Austria) F Misolic	7^{7}	3	7
7	(Croatia) B Gojo	4	5
Q	(Sweden) M Ymer	6	7
(Hungary) F Marozsán	6	6
LL	(Turkey) C İlkel	2	4

Quarterfinals
LL	(Turkey) A Çelikbilek	6	5	6
(Austria) F Misolic	4	7	4
Q	(Sweden) M Ymer	6	6
(Hungary) F Marozsán	2	1

Semifinals
LL	(Turkey) A Çelikbilek	4	4
Q	(Sweden) M Ymer	6	6
