= 2024 ATP Lyon Open – Singles =

Singles
- 2024 ATP Lyon Open

Final
- Champion: (France) Giovanni Mpetshi Perricard
- Runner-up: (Argentina) Tomás Martín Etcheverry
- Score: 6–4, 1–6, 7–6^{(9–7)}

Details
- Draw: 28 (4 Q / 3 WC )
- Seeds: 8

Events
Singles	Doubles
- ATP Lyon Open

Giovanni Mpetshi Perricard defeated Tomás Martín Etcheverry in the final, 6–4, 1–6, 7–6^{(9–7)} to win the singles tennis title at the 2024 ATP Lyon Open. It was his first ATP Tour title. Mpetshi Perricard saved a championship point in the third-set tiebreak and became the second consecutive wildcard to win the tournament, after Arthur Fils the previous year.

Fils was the reigning champion, but withdrew before the tournament began.

== Seeds ==
The top four seeds receive a bye into the second round.

1. (France) Ugo Humbert (second round)
2. (Kazakhstan) Alexander Bublik (semifinals)
3. (France) Adrian Mannarino (second round)
4. (Argentina) Francisco Cerúndolo (second round)
5. (United States) Frances Tiafoe (second round)
6. (Argentina) Tomás Martín Etcheverry (final)
7. (Argentina) Mariano Navone (withdrew)
8. (France) Gaël Monfils (withdrew)

== Draw ==
Key

- Q = Qualifier
- WC = Wild card
- LL = Lucky loser
- Alt = Alternate
- ITF = ITF entry
- PR = Protected ranking
- SR = Special ranking
- SE = Special exempt
- JE = Junior exempt
- JR = Junior Accelerator Programme entrant
- CO = College Accelerator Programme entrant
- NG = Next Gen Accelerator Program entrant
- w/o = Walkover
- r = Retired
- d = Defaulted

=== Finals ===
Semifinals
6	(Argentina) Tomás Martín Etcheverry	6	6
(Italy) Luciano Darderi	2	4
WC	(France) Giovanni Mpetshi Perricard	6	7
2	(Kazakhstan) Alexander Bublik	4	5

Final
6	(Argentina) Tomás Martín Etcheverry	4	6	6^{7}
WC	(France) Giovanni Mpetshi Perricard	6	1	7^{9}

=== Top half ===
First round
(Germany) D Koepfer	6	6^{4}	6
LL	(Spain) J Barranco Cosano	4	7^{7}	4
(Brazil) T Seyboth Wild	6	6
(Spain) P Martínez	4	1
Q	(Spain) N Sánchez Izquierdo	6	2	2
6	(Argentina) TM Etcheverry	1	6	6
(Italy) L Darderi	7	7^{7}
Q	(Japan) T Daniel	5	6^{3}
(United Kingdom) D Evans	3	6	6^{6}
(France) A Rinderknech	6	4	7^{8}
(Spain) J Munar	6^{5}	4
5	(United States) F Tiafoe	7^{7}	6

Second round
1	(France) U Humbert	6	4	4
(Germany) D Koepfer	2	6	6
(Brazil) T Seyboth Wild	5	0^{r}
6	(Argentina) TM Etcheverry	7	3
3	(France) A Mannarino	6^{4}	3
(Italy) L Darderi	7^{7}	6
(France) A Rinderknech	7^{9}	6
5	(United States) F Tiafoe	6^{7}	4

Quarterfinals
(Germany) D Koepfer	4	1
6	(Argentina) TM Etcheverry	6	6
(Italy) L Darderi	w/o
(France) A Rinderknech

Semifinals
6	(Argentina) TM Etcheverry	6	6
(Italy) L Darderi	2	4

=== Bottom half ===
First round
LL	(Germany) S Fanselow	0	1
(Japan) Y Nishioka	6	6
WC	(France) G Mpetshi Perricard	6	6
(Italy) L Sonego	3	4
Q	(France) H Gaston	7^{7}	7^{7}
Q	(Colombia) DE Galán	6^{2}	6^{4}
LL	(Argentina) P Cachín	1	4
P Kotov	6	6
WC	(France) A Müller	6	6
WC	(France) R Gasquet	4	4
(Australia) A Vukic	6	6
(United States) M McDonald	2	2

Second round
(Japan) Y Nishioka
WC	(France) G Mpetshi Perricard	w/o
Q	(France) H Gaston	6	2	6
4	(Argentina) F Cerúndolo	2	6	3
P Kotov	7^{10}	6
WC	(France) A Müller	6^{8}	1
(Australia) A Vukic	4	2
2	(Kazakhstan) A Bublik	6	6

Quarterfinals
WC	(France) G Mpetshi Perricard	6	4	6
Q	(France) H Gaston	4	6	3
P Kotov	7^{7}	6^{4}	3
2	(Kazakhstan) A Bublik	6^{4}	7^{7}	6

Semifinals
WC	(France) G Mpetshi Perricard	6	7
2	(Kazakhstan) A Bublik	4	5

== Qualifying ==
=== Seeds ===
1. (Japan) Taro Daniel (qualified)
2. (France) Constant Lestienne (first round)
3. (Colombia) Daniel Elahi Galán (qualified)
4. (France) Hugo Gaston (qualified)
5. (Argentina) Pedro Cachín (qualifying competition, lucky loser)
6. (Argentina) Thiago Agustín Tirante (first round)
7. (France) Harold Mayot (qualifying competition)
8. (France) Pierre-Hugues Herbert (first round)

=== Qualifiers ===
1. (Japan) Taro Daniel
2. (Spain) Nikolás Sánchez Izquierdo
3. (Colombia) Daniel Elahi Galán
4. (France) Hugo Gaston

=== Lucky losers ===
1. (Argentina) Pedro Cachín
2. (Spain) Javier Barranco Cosano
3. (Germany) Sebastian Fanselow

=== Qualifying draw ===
==== First qualifier ====
First round
1	(Japan) Taro Daniel	6	6
WC	(France) Maxime Chazal	2	3
(Germany) Sebastian Fanselow	6	7^{7}
6	(Argentina) Thiago Agustín Tirante	4	6^{4}

Qualifying competition
1	(Japan) Taro Daniel	6	6
(Germany) Sebastian Fanselow	1	4

==== Second qualifier ====
First round
2	(France) Constant Lestienne	6	1	6^{2}
(Spain) Nikolás Sánchez Izquierdo	3	6	7^{7}
(Spain) Javier Barranco Cosano	7^{7}	4	7
8	(France) Pierre-Hugues Herbert	6^{5}	6	5

Qualifying competition
(Spain) Nikolás Sánchez Izquierdo	6	6
(Spain) Javier Barranco Cosano	1	3

==== Third qualifier ====
First round
3	(Colombia) Daniel Elahi Galán	6	6
(Spain) David Jordà Sanchis	2	3
(France) Tristan Lamasine	2	2
7/WC	(France) Harold Mayot	6	6

Qualifying competition
3	(Colombia) Daniel Elahi Galán	6	7^{8}
7/WC	(France) Harold Mayot	2	6^{6}

==== Fourth qualifier ====
First round
4	(France) Hugo Gaston	7^{7}	6
(Argentina) Guido Andreozzi	6^{5}	4
(Argentina) Renzo Olivo	2	1
5	(Argentina) Pedro Cachín	6	6

Qualifying competition
4	(France) Hugo Gaston	6	6
5	(Argentina) Pedro Cachín	2	3
