= 2022 Stockholm Open – Singles =

Singles
- 2022 Stockholm Open

Final
- Champion: (Denmark) Holger Rune
- Runner-up: (Greece) Stefanos Tsitsipas
- Score: 6–4, 6–4

Details
- Draw: 28 (4 Q / 3 WC)
- Seeds: 8

Events
Singles	Doubles
- Stockholm Open

Holger Rune defeated Stefanos Tsitsipas in the final, 6–4, 6–4 to win the singles tennis title at the 2022 Stockholm Open. It was his second career ATP Tour singles title.

Tommy Paul was the defending champion, but lost to Mikael Ymer in the second round.

== Seeds ==
The top four seeds received a bye into the second round.

1. (Greece) Stefanos Tsitsipas (final)
2. (United Kingdom) Cameron Norrie (quarterfinals)
3. (United States) Frances Tiafoe (quarterfinals)
4. (Canada) Denis Shapovalov (quarterfinals)
5. (Australia) Alex de Minaur (semifinals)
6. (Bulgaria) Grigor Dimitrov (first round)
7. (Denmark) Holger Rune (champion)
8. (United States) Tommy Paul (second round)

== Draw ==
Key

- Q = Qualifier
- WC = Wild card
- LL = Lucky loser
- Alt = Alternate
- ITF = ITF entry
- PR = Protected ranking
- SR = Special ranking
- SE = Special exempt
- JE = Junior exempt
- JR = Junior Accelerator Programme entrant
- CO = College Accelerator Programme entrant
- NG = Next Gen Accelerator Program entrant
- w/o = Walkover
- r = Retired
- d = Defaulted

=== Finals ===
Semifinals
1/WC	(Greece) Stefanos Tsitsipas	6	6
(Finland) Emil Ruusuvuori	2	2
5	(Australia) Alex de Minaur	6	6^{1}	5
7	(Denmark) Holger Rune	4	7^{7}	7

Final
1/WC	(Greece) Stefanos Tsitsipas	4	4
7	(Denmark) Holger Rune	6	6

=== Top half ===
First round
I Ivashka	6	6^{5}	4
(United States) M Cressy	4	7^{7}	6
(France) Q Halys	7	4	3
SE	(Sweden) M Ymer	5	6	6
WC	(Sweden) L Borg	7	4	1
8	(United States) T Paul	5	6	6
(Germany) O Otte	6^{2}	7^{7}	3
WC	(Sweden) E Ymer	7^{7}	6^{2}	6
(Finland) E Ruusuvuori	6	6
(Portugal) J Sousa	3	2
(Czech Republic) J Lehečka	6	1	7^{7}
6	(Bulgaria) G Dimitrov	4	6	6^{5}

Second round
1/WC	(Greece) S Tsitsipas	7^{7}	7^{14}
(United States) M Cressy	6^{5}	6^{12}
SE	(Sweden) M Ymer	6	6
8	(United States) T Paul	2	3
3	(United States) F Tiafoe	3	7^{7}	7^{7}
WC	(Sweden) E Ymer	6	6^{4}	6^{2}
(Finland) E Ruusuvuori	6	6
(Czech Republic) J Lehečka	2	2

Quarterfinals
1/WC	(Greece) S Tsitsipas	7	6
SE	(Sweden) M Ymer	5	3
3	(United States) F Tiafoe	1	2
(Finland) E Ruusuvuori	6	6

Semifinals
1/WC	(Greece) S Tsitsipas	6	6
(Finland) E Ruusuvuori	2	2

=== Bottom half ===
First round
5	(Australia) A de Minaur	6	6
(France) B Bonzi	3	1
(United States) JJ Wolf	7	6
(Slovakia) A Molčan	5	4
Q	(Switzerland) A Bellier	6	6
Q	A Shevchenko	4	2
7	(Denmark) H Rune	7	6
(Brazil) T Monteiro	5	2
Q	(Australia) J Kubler	2	4
(Chile) C Garín	6	6
Q	(Czech Republic) L Rosol	3	2
A Karatsev	6	6

Second round
5	(Australia) A de Minaur	6	6
(United States) JJ Wolf	4	2
Q	(Switzerland) A Bellier	4	5
4	(Canada) D Shapovalov	6	7
7	(Denmark) H Rune	7^{7}	6
(Chile) C Garín	6^{2}	1
A Karatsev	7^{10}	3	4
2	(United Kingdom) C Norrie	6^{8}	6	6

Quarterfinals
5	(Australia) A de Minaur	6	7^{7}
4	(Canada) D Shapovalov	2	6^{4}
7	(Denmark) H Rune	6^{4}	6	6
2	(United Kingdom) C Norrie	7^{7}	3	3

Semifinals
5	(Australia) A de Minaur	6	6^{1}	5
7	(Denmark) H Rune	4	7^{7}	7

== Qualifying ==
=== Seeds ===
1. Pavel Kotov (qualifying competition)
2. (Australia) Jason Kubler (qualified)
3. (Spain) Pablo Andújar (first round)
4. (Spain) Fernando Verdasco (withdrew)
5. (Czech Republic) Vít Kopřiva (first round)
6. Alexander Shevchenko (qualified)
7. (Bosnia and Herzegovina) Damir Džumhur (qualifying competition)
8. (Switzerland) Antoine Bellier (qualified)

=== Qualifiers ===
1. Alexander Shevchenko
2. (Australia) Jason Kubler
3. (Switzerland) Antoine Bellier
4. (Czech Republic) Lukáš Rosol

=== Qualifying draw ===
==== First qualifier ====
First round
1	Pavel Kotov	7	6
(Germany) Peter Gojowczyk	5	3
(Romania) Filip Cristian Jianu	3	3
6	Alexander Shevchenko	6	6

Qualifying competition
1	Pavel Kotov	6	3	2
6	Alexander Shevchenko	4	6	6

==== Second qualifier ====
First round
2	(Australia) Jason Kubler	6	6
WC	(Sweden) Jonathan Mridha	2	3
(Finland) Otto Virtanen	4	1
7	(Bosnia and Herzegovina) Damir Džumhur	6	6

Qualifying competition
2	(Australia) Jason Kubler	6	7^{7}
7	(Bosnia and Herzegovina) Damir Džumhur	3	6^{4}

==== Third qualifier ====
First round
3	(Spain) Pablo Andújar	3	2
WC	(Sweden) Karl Friberg	6	6
(Kazakhstan) Mikhail Kukushkin	1	6^{5}
8	(Switzerland) Antoine Bellier	6	7^{7}

Qualifying competition
WC	(Sweden) Karl Friberg	3	6^{4}
8	(Switzerland) Antoine Bellier	6	7^{7}

==== Fourth qualifier ====
First round
Alt	(Colombia) Cristian Rodríguez	4	3
(Czech Republic) Lukáš Rosol	6	6
(Romania) Nicholas David Ionel	7^{7}	7
5	(Czech Republic) Vít Kopřiva	6^{4}	5

Qualifying competition
(Czech Republic) Lukáš Rosol	6	7^{7}
(Romania) Nicholas David Ionel	3	6^{2}
