= 2022 Stockholm Open – Doubles =

Doubles
- 2022 Stockholm Open

Final
- Champions: (El Salvador) Marcelo Arévalo (Netherlands) Jean-Julien Rojer
- Runners-up: (United Kingdom) Lloyd Glasspool (Finland) Harri Heliövaara
- Score: 6–3, 6–3

Events
Singles	Doubles
← 2021 ·	Stockholm Open	· 2023 →

Marcelo Arévalo and Jean-Julien Rojer defeated Lloyd Glasspool and Harri Heliövaara in the final, 6–3, 6–3 to win the doubles tennis title at the 2022 Stockholm Open.

Santiago González and Andrés Molteni were the defending champions, but lost in the semifinals to Arévalo and Rojer.

== Seeds ==
1. (El Salvador) Marcelo Arévalo / (Netherlands) Jean-Julien Rojer (champions)
2. (Germany) Tim Pütz / (New Zealand) Michael Venus (withdrew)
3. (United Kingdom) Lloyd Glasspool / (Finland) Harri Heliövaara (final)
4. (Mexico) Santiago González / (Argentina) Andrés Molteni (semifinals)

== Draw ==
=== Key ===
- Q = Qualifier
- WC = Wild card
- LL = Lucky loser
- Alt = Alternate
- ITF = ITF entry
- PR = Protected ranking
- SR = Special ranking
- SE = Special exempt
- JE = Junior exempt
- JR = Junior Accelerator Programme entrant
- CO = College Accelerator Programme entrant
- NG = Next Gen Accelerator Program entrant
- w/o = Walkover
- r = Retired
- d = Defaulted

=== Draw ===
First round
1	(El Salvador) M Arévalo (Netherlands) J-J Rojer	6	6^{4}	[10]
(United States) R Galloway (Mexico) H Hach Verdugo	2	7^{7}	[5]
(France) J Eysseric (France) Q Halys	3	2
PR	(Poland) Ł Kubot (Austria) P Oswald	6	6
4	(Mexico) S González (Argentina) A Molteni	6	3	[10]
(Kazakhstan) A Golubev (Kazakhstan) A Nedovyesov	3	6	[7]
(Finland) E Ruusuvuori (Portugal) J Sousa	3	1
(United Kingdom) C Norrie (United States) T Paul	6	6
WC	(Sweden) F Bergevi (Greece) Pe Tsitsipas	4	4
(Czech Republic) R Jebavý (Czech Republic) A Pavlásek	6	6
WC	(Sweden) L Borg (Sweden) S Freund	3	2
3	(United Kingdom) L Glasspool (Finland) H Heliövaara	6	6
(Ecuador) D Hidalgo (Colombia) C Rodríguez	6	6^{5}	[10]
(Japan) B McLachlan (Australia) J-P Smith	3	7^{7}	[7]
(United States) M Cressy (France) A Olivetti	6	6
Alt	P Kotov; A Shevchenko	2	3

Quarterfinals
1	(El Salvador) M Arévalo (Netherlands) J-J Rojer	6	7^{7}
PR	(Poland) Ł Kubot (Austria) P Oswald	3	6^{1}
4	(Mexico) S González (Argentina) A Molteni	w/o
(United Kingdom) C Norrie (United States) T Paul
(Czech Republic) R Jebavý (Czech Republic) A Pavlásek	3	4
3	(United Kingdom) L Glasspool (Finland) H Heliövaara	6	6
(Ecuador) D Hidalgo (Colombia) C Rodríguez	4	4
(United States) M Cressy (France) A Olivetti	6	6

Semifinals
1	(El Salvador) M Arévalo (Netherlands) J-J Rojer	7	7
4	(Mexico) S González (Argentina) A Molteni	5	5
3	(United Kingdom) L Glasspool (Finland) H Heliövaara	7	6
(United States) M Cressy (France) A Olivetti	5	3

Final
1	(El Salvador) M Arévalo (Netherlands) J-J Rojer	6	6
3	(United Kingdom) L Glasspool (Finland) H Heliövaara	3	3
