= 2022 Stockholm Open =

Men's tennis tournament

- Date: 17–23 October
- Edition: 53rd
- Category: ATP Tour 250 series
- Draw: 28S / 16D
- Prize money: €648,130
- Surface: Hard (indoor)
- Location: Stockholm, Sweden
- Venue: Kungliga tennishallen

Champions

Singles
- (Denmark) Holger Rune

Doubles
- (El Salvador) Marcelo Arévalo / (Netherlands) Jean-Julien Rojer
- Stockholm Open

The 2022 Stockholm Open was a professional men's tennis tournament played on indoor hard courts. It was the 53rd edition of the tournament, and part of the ATP Tour 250 series of the 2022 ATP Tour. It took place at the Kungliga tennishallen in Stockholm, Sweden from 17 to 23 October 2022.

== Finals ==
=== Singles ===
- (Denmark) Holger Rune defeated (Greece) Stefanos Tsitsipas, 6–4, 6–4

=== Doubles ===
- (El Salvador) Marcelo Arévalo / (Netherlands) Jean-Julien Rojer defeated (United Kingdom) Lloyd Glasspool / (Finland) Harri Heliövaara, 6–3, 6–3

== Singles main-draw entrants ==
=== Seeds ===
| Country | Player | Rank^{1} | Seed |
|---|---|---|---|
| GRE | Stefanos Tsitsipas | 6 | 1 |
| GBR | Cameron Norrie | 10 | 2 |
| USA | Frances Tiafoe | 17 | 3 |
| CAN | Denis Shapovalov | 20 | 4 |
| AUS | Alex de Minaur | 23 | 5 |
| BUL | Grigor Dimitrov | 24 | 6 |
| DEN | Holger Rune | 27 | 7 |
| USA | Tommy Paul | 30 | 8 |

- Rankings are as of 10 October 2022.

=== Other entrants ===
The following players received wildcards into the singles main draw:

- (Sweden) Leo Borg
- (Greece) Stefanos Tsitsipas
- (Sweden) Elias Ymer

The following player received entry as a special exempt:

- (Sweden) Mikael Ymer

The following players received entry from the qualifying draw:

- (Switzerland) Antoine Bellier
- (Australia) Jason Kubler
- (Czech Republic) Lukáš Rosol
- Alexander Shevchenko

=== Withdrawals ===
Before the tournament

- (Georgia (country)) Nikoloz Basilashvili → replaced by (United States) J. J. Wolf
- (United States) Taylor Fritz → replaced by (Chile) Cristian Garín

== Doubles main-draw entrants ==
=== Seeds ===
| Country | Player | Country | Player | Rank^{1} | Seed |
|---|---|---|---|---|---|
| ESA | Marcelo Arévalo | NED | Jean-Julien Rojer | 11 | 1 |
| ~~GER~~ | ~~Tim Pütz~~ | ~~NZL~~ | ~~Michael Venus~~ | ~~18~~ | ~~2~~ |
| GBR | Lloyd Glasspool | FIN | Harri Heliövaara | 36 | 3 |
| MEX | Santiago González | ARG | Andrés Molteni | 74 | 4 |

- Rankings are as of 10 October 2022

=== Other entrants ===
The following pairs received wildcards into the doubles main draw:

- (Sweden) Filip Bergevi / (Greece) Petros Tsitsipas
- (Sweden) Leo Borg / (Sweden) Simon Freund

The following pair received entry as alternates:

- Pavel Kotov / Alexander Shevchenko

=== Withdrawals ===
- (United States) William Blumberg / (United States) Tommy Paul → replaced by (United Kingdom) Cameron Norrie / (United States) Tommy Paul
- (France) Jonathan Eysseric / (France) Constant Lestienne → replaced by (France) Jonathan Eysseric / (France) Quentin Halys
- (Sweden) André Göransson / (Japan) Ben McLachlan → replaced by (Japan) Ben McLachlan / (Australia) John-Patrick Smith
- (Croatia) Nikola Mektić / (Croatia) Mate Pavić → replaced by (Czech Republic) Roman Jebavý / (Czech Republic) Adam Pavlásek
- (Germany) Tim Pütz / (New Zealand) Michael Venus → replaced by Pavel Kotov / Alexander Shevchenko
- (United States) Rajeev Ram / (United Kingdom) Joe Salisbury → replaced by (United States) Robert Galloway / (Mexico) Hans Hach Verdugo
