= 2025 All In Open =

- Date: 10 – 15 November
- Edition: 2nd
- Surface: Hard (indoor)
- Location: Lyon, France

Champions

Singles
- (Germany) Jan-Lennard Struff

Doubles
- (Ecuador) Diego Hidalgo / (United States) Patrik Trhac
← 2024 ·	All In Open	· 2026 →

The 2025 All In Open Auvergne-Rhône-Alpes de Décines was a professional tennis tournament played on hardcourts. It was the second edition of the tournament which was part of the 2025 ATP Challenger Tour. It took place in Lyon, France between 10 and 15 November 2025.

== Singles main-draw entrants ==
=== Seeds ===
Country	Player	Rank^{1}	Seed
SRB	Laslo Djere	82	1
CZE	Vít Kopřiva	92	2
JPN	Shintaro Mochizuki	93	3
AUS	Tristan Schoolkate	99	4
ARG	Thiago Agustín Tirante	100	5
GER	Jan-Lennard Struff	101	6
GER	Yannick Hanfmann	117	7
GBR	Billy Harris	124	8

- ^{1} Rankings are as of 3 November 2025.

=== Other entrants ===
The following players received wildcards into the singles main draw:

- (France) Arthur Géa
- (France) Sascha Gueymard Wayenburg
- (France) Tom Paris

The following players received entry into the singles main draw through the Junior Accelerator programme:

- (Poland) Tomasz Berkieta
- (Czech Republic) Jan Kumstát

The following players received entry into the singles main draw as alternates:

- (United Kingdom) Arthur Fery
- (Belgium) Gauthier Onclin
- (France) Luka Pavlovic

The following players received entry from the qualifying draw:

- (France) Geoffrey Blancaneaux
- (United Kingdom) Liam Broady
- (Croatia) Matej Dodig
- (Norway) Viktor Durasovic
- (Kazakhstan) Mikhail Kukushkin
- (Kazakhstan) Beibit Zhukayev

The following player received entry as a lucky loser:

- (France) Dan Added

== Champions ==
=== Singles ===
- (Germany) Jan-Lennard Struff def. (United Kingdom) Liam Broady 6–4, 6–4.

=== Doubles ===
- (Ecuador) Diego Hidalgo / (United States) Patrik Trhac def. (India) Sriram Balaji / (Germany) Hendrik Jebens 6–3, 6–4.
