= 2024 Nonthaburi Challenger III – Doubles =

Doubles
- 2024 Nonthaburi Challenger III

Final
- Champions: (United Kingdom) Luke Johnson (Tunisia) Skander Mansouri
- Runners-up: (India) Rithvik Choudary Bollipalli (India) Niki Kaliyanda Poonacha
- Score: 7–5, 6–4

Events
Singles	Doubles
- Nonthaburi Challenger

Manuel Guinard and Grégoire Jacq were the defending champions but lost in the first round to Rithvik Choudary Bollipalli and Niki Kaliyanda Poonacha.

Luke Johnson and Skander Mansouri won the title after defeating Bollipalli and Kaliyanda Poonacha 7–5, 6–4 in the final.

== Seeds ==
1. (United Kingdom) Luke Johnson / (Tunisia) Skander Mansouri (champions)
2. (France) Manuel Guinard / (France) Grégoire Jacq (first round)
3. (India) Saketh Myneni / (India) Ramkumar Ramanathan (first round)
4. (Japan) Toshihide Matsui / (Japan) Kaito Uesugi (semifinals)

== Draw ==
Key

- Q = Qualifier
- WC = Wild card
- LL = Lucky loser
- Alt = Alternate
- ITF = ITF entry
- PR = Protected ranking
- SR = Special ranking
- SE = Special exempt
- JE = Junior exempt
- JR = Junior Accelerator Programme entrant
- CO = College Accelerator Programme entrant
- NG = Next Gen Accelerator Program entrant
- w/o = Walkover
- r = Retired
- d = Defaulted

First round
1	(United Kingdom) L Johnson (Tunisia) S Mansouri	6	2	[10]
(United Kingdom) S Duncan (Canada) K Stevenson	4	6	[8]
(Portugal) G Oliveira (Spain) O Roca Batalla	6	7^{7}
WC	(Thailand) Credit Chaiyarin (Thailand) Natthasith Kunsuwan	1	6^{5}
4	(Japan) T Matsui (Japan) K Uesugi	6	6
(Mexico) H Hach Verdugo (South Korea) J-s Nam	3	4
(Philippines) FC Alcantara (China) F Sun	4	6	[7]
WC	(Thailand) P Isaro (Thailand) M Jones	6	4	[10]
(United Kingdom) B Harris (Australia) A Santillan	6	6
Alt	(Tunisia) A Dougaz (France) L Poullain	3	2
(Chinese Taipei) R Ho (Japan) K Uchida	6^{5}	7	[10]
3	(India) S Myneni (India) R Ramanathan	7^{7}	5	[7]
(Pakistan) A-u-H Qureshi (Indonesia) C Rungkat	7	6
(United Kingdom) J Paris (United Kingdom) R Peniston	5	4
(India) RC Bollipalli (India) N Kaliyanda Poonacha	6	6
2	(France) M Guinard (France) G Jacq	3	4

Quarterfinals
1	(United Kingdom) L Johnson (Tunisia) S Mansouri	4	6	[10]
(Portugal) G Oliveira (Spain) O Roca Batalla	6	4	[7]
4	(Japan) T Matsui (Japan) K Uesugi	6	7^{9}
WC	(Thailand) P Isaro (Thailand) M Jones	4	6^{7}
(United Kingdom) B Harris (Australia) A Santillan	6	6
(Chinese Taipei) R Ho (Japan) K Uchida	4	3
(Pakistan) A-u-H Qureshi (Indonesia) C Rungkat	3	7^{7}	[5]
(India) RC Bollipalli (India) N Kaliyanda Poonacha	6	6^{4}	[10]

Semifinals
1	(United Kingdom) L Johnson (Tunisia) S Mansouri	6	6
4	(Japan) T Matsui (Japan) K Uesugi	2	4
(United Kingdom) B Harris (Australia) A Santillan	6^{3}	4
(India) RC Bollipalli (India) N Kaliyanda Poonacha	7^{7}	6

Final
1	(United Kingdom) L Johnson (Tunisia) S Mansouri	7	6
(India) RC Bollipalli (India) N Kaliyanda Poonacha	5	4
