= Mikael Ymer =

Swedish tennis player (born 1998)

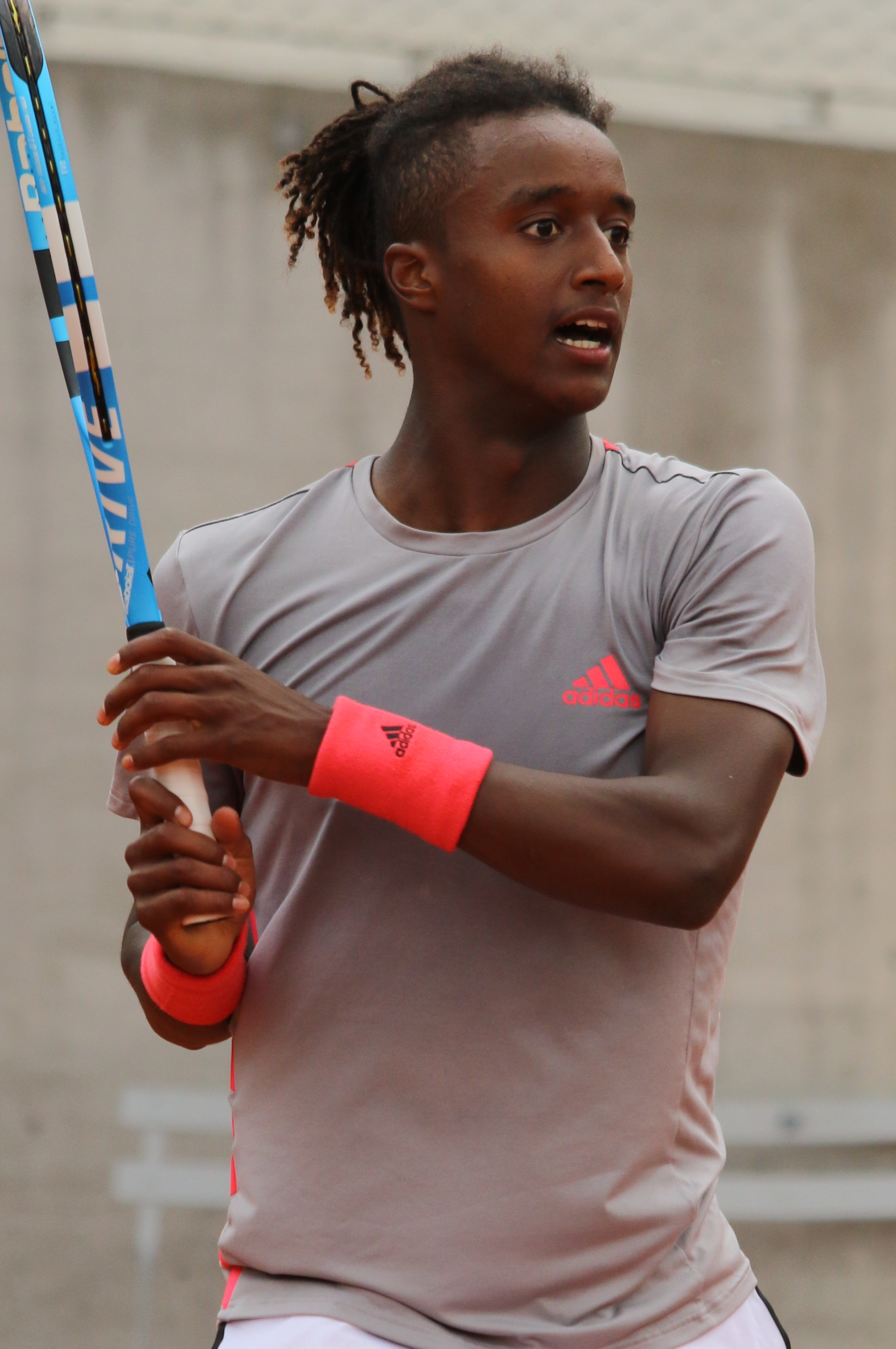
- Ymer at the 2019 French Open
- Full name: Mikael Wondwosen Yemer
- Country (sports): Sweden
- Residence: Stockholm, Sweden
- Born: 9 September 1998 (age 28) Skara, Sweden
- Height: 1.85 m (6 ft 1 in)
- Turned pro: 2015
- Plays: Right-handed (two-handed backhand)
- Coach: Frederik Nielsen, Kalle Norberg, Daniel Berta
- Prize money: US $2,802,057

Singles
- Career record: 74–84 (ATP Tour, Grand Slam, Davis Cup)
- Career titles: 0
- Highest ranking: No. 50 (17 April 2023)

Grand Slam singles results
- Australian Open: 3R (2021)
- French Open: 3R (2021, 2022)
- Wimbledon: 3R (2023)
- US Open: 1R (2020, 2021, 2022)

Doubles
- Career record: 7–9
- Career titles: 1
- Highest ranking: No. 187 (16 October 2017)

Mikael Ymer (born 9 September 1998) is a Swedish inactive professional tennis player. He has a career-high ATP singles ranking of world No. 50 achieved on 17 April 2023 and the doubles ranking his career high is No. 187 achieved on 16 October 2017. He is the current No. 5 Swedish singles player. Ymer was the No. 1 Swedish player until 2023.

== Early life ==
Ymer was born in Skara, Sweden to Ethiopian immigrant parents. He is the younger brother of fellow tennis player Elias Ymer. His other brother, Rafael, is a tennis player on the juniors' circuit.

== Juniors ==
Mikael contested his first junior major final at the 2015 Wimbledon Championships but was defeated by American Reilly Opelka in straight sets.

In 2015 Ymer managed to claim his second European Championships title (U18), beating Bernabé Zapata Miralles in the final in straight sets.

== Professional career ==
=== 2016–2018: Maiden ATP title in doubles, Masters 1000 debut and first win ===
He made his Masters 1000 debut at the 2017 Miami Open as a wildcard and won his first match at this level in the 2018 edition of the same tournament after also receiving a wildcard.

=== 2019–2021: Major & Masters & Top 70 debuts, Two Majors & Masters third rounds, Maiden final ===
He made his Grand Slam main draw debut through qualifying at the 2019 French Open where he recorded his first Major win against fellow qualifier Blaž Rola in straight sets.

He finished year 2019 ranked No. 74 in the singles rankings.

He made his debut at the 2020 Australian Open and defeated Yasutaka Uchiyama in the first round. He reached a new career-high ranking of No. 67 on 2 March 2020.

Ymer reached the third round of a Grand Slam tournament for the first time in his career at the 2021 Australian Open. He did so by defeating 26th seed Hubert Hurkacz and qualifier Carlos Alcaraz, before losing to fifth seed Stefanos Tsitsipas. At the 2021 Miami Open he reached also the third round for the first time at a Masters 1000 defeating 27th seed Nikoloz Basilashvili.

As world No. 105 at the 2021 French Open, Ymer achieved the biggest win of his career by defeating world No. 15 Gaël Monfils in the second round. With this victory, he once again reached the third round of a major, this time losing to Jannik Sinner.

At the 2021 Winston-Salem Open, Ymer beat eleventh seed Albert Ramos Viñolas, lucky loser Max Purcell, and thirteenth seed Frances Tiafoe to reach his first ATP semi-final. He continued with a win over fifteenth seed Carlos Alcaraz to reach his first ATP final, making him the first Swedish tour-level finalist since Robin Söderling at the 2011 Swedish Open. Ymer lost the final to Ilya Ivashka in straight sets in 56 minutes.

In August, Ymer played at the 2021 US Open, losing to Jenson Brooksby in the first round.

He finished year 2021 ranked No. 93 in the singles rankings.

=== 2022: French Open third round, Maiden ATP 500 semifinal ===
Ymer was not able to defend his third round showing at the 2022 Australian Open, losing to Stefanos Tsitsipas in the opening round.

In February, at the 2022 Open Sud de France, Ymer reached the semi-finals, defeating three French players Corentin Moutet, third seed Gaël Monfils (his second top-20 win) and Richard Gasquet.

At the 2022 French Open he reached the third round at this Major for the second consecutive time in his career defeating James Duckworth and 29th seed Dan Evans before losing to 4th seed Stefanos Tsitsipas.

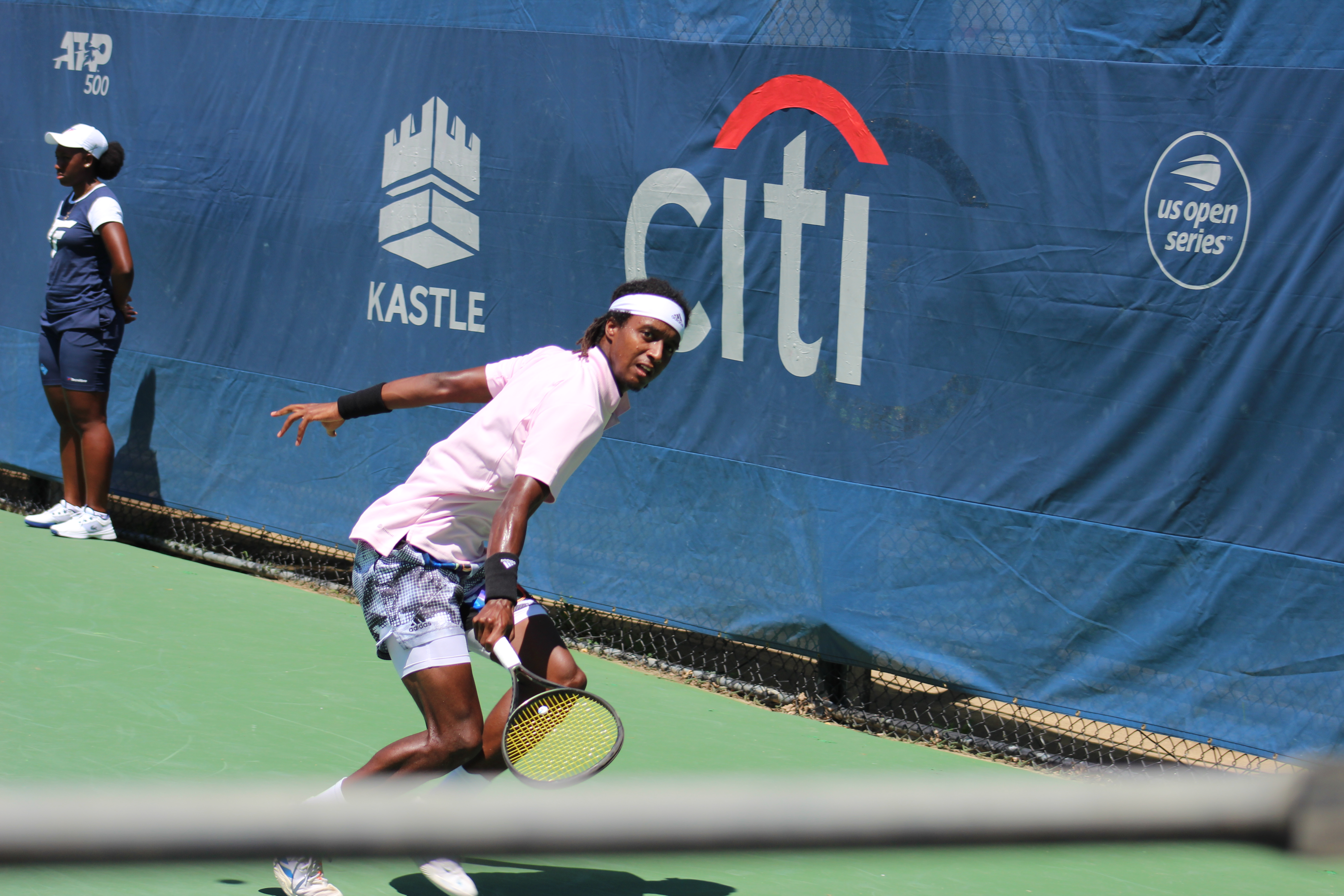
Ymer in 2nd round match at Citi Open, August 3, 2022

At 2022 Wimbledon Championships he reached the second round defeating Daniel Altmaier.

At the 2022 Citi Open he defeated Andy Murray and 15th seed Aslan Karatsev to reach the round of 16. Next he defeated Emil Ruusuvuori to reach the quarterfinals of an ATP 500 tournament for the first time. In the quarterfinals, he defeated Sebastian Korda in three sets to advance to his first ATP 500 semi-final in his career. As a result, he moved close to 40 positions up the rankings back into the top 80 to No. 77 on 8 August 2022.

At the 2022 Winston-Salem Open, Ymer received a wildcard but lost in the second to qualifier Marc-Andrea Huesler. As a result, his ranking fell to No. 99 on 29 August 2022. At the US Open he lost in the first round.

At the 2022 Firenze Open he reached the semi-finals as a qualifier defeating again fifth seed Aslan Karatsev and Roberto Carballés Baena but lost to JJ Wolf. As a result, he moved 20 positions up in the rankings back into the top 80 on 17 October 2022. At his home tournament in Stockholm using a special exempt status, he reached the quarterfinals where he lost to top seed Stefanos Tsitsipas. As a result, he moved up to No. 76 on 24 October 2022. He continued his good form qualifying for the main draw of the 2022 Rolex Paris Masters for the second year in a row. He won his first round match defeating Alexander Bublik. He lost to world No. 8 Félix Auger-Aliassime in a three tight set match with two tiebreaks that lasted 3 hours and 30 minutes.

=== 2023: Top 50 debut, Wimbledon third round, suspension ===
Ymer started his 2023 season in Adelaide. At the first tournament, he lost in the first round to qualifier Roman Safiullin. Getting past qualifying at the second tournament, he reached the quarterfinals where he was defeated by eventual champion, Kwon Soon-woo. He lost in the first round of the Australian Open to 31st seed Yoshihito Nishioka.

Making it past qualifying at the first edition of the BW Open, Ymer made it to the final where he lost to top seed David Goffin. As a result, he reached the top 60 in the rankings on 30 January 2023. Representing Sweden in the Davis Cup tie against Bosnia and Herzegovina, he won both of his matches beating Mirza Bašić and Damir Džumhur. Sweden ended up winning the tie over Bosnia and Herzegovina 3–1 to advance to the Davis Cup Finals. At the Open Sud de France, he lost in the first round to seventh seed Emil Ruusuvuori. At the Rotterdam Open he qualified again for the main draw but lost to wildcard Tallon Griekspoor. At the 2023 Open 13 Provence he reached the quarterfinals after a walkover from sixth seed David Goffin in the second round. He lost to top seed and eventual champion Hubert Hurkacz. He reached a new career high of world No. 51 on 10 April 2023 and the top 50 a week later.

Ymer was disqualified from his match at the 2023 ATP Lyon Open against Arthur Fils after smashing a racquet against the umpire's chair.

He reached the quarterfinals at the 2023 Eastbourne International. At the 2023 Wimbledon Championships he reached the third round for the first time at this Major defeating world No. 9 Taylor Fritz in five sets after being two sets to love down.

In July 2023, the CAS issued an 18-month competition ban to Ymer for an anti-doping rule violation relating to three missed tests in a twelve-month period ("whereabouts failures"). CAS overturned an earlier ruling by an independent tribunal that had found Ymer not negligent.

Although Ymer announced in August 2023 that he had decided to retire from tennis, he reversed his decision in April 2024 and returned to competition at the end of his period of ineligibility in January 2025, winning an ITF tournament in Luxembourg.

== Performance timelines ==
Key
| W | F | SF | QF | #R | RR | Q# | P# | DNQ | A | Z# | PO | G | S | B | NMS | NTI | P | NH |

(W) winner; (F) finalist; (SF) semifinalist; (QF) quarterfinalist; (#R) rounds 4, 3, 2, 1; (RR) round-robin stage; (Q#) qualification round; (P#) preliminary round; (DNQ) did not qualify; (A) absent; (Z#) Davis/Fed Cup Zonal Group (with number indication) or (PO) play-off; (G) gold, (S) silver or (B) bronze Olympic/Paralympic medal; (NMS) not a Masters tournament; (NTI) not a Tier I tournament; (P) postponed; (NH) not held; (SR) strike rate (events won / competed); (W–L) win–loss record.
To avoid confusion and double counting, these charts are updated at the conclusion of a tournament or when the player's participation has ended.

=== Singles ===
Current through the 2025 Stockholm Open.

| Tournament | 2015 | 2016 | 2017 | 2018 | 2019 | 2020 | 2021 | 2022 | 2023 | 2024 | 2025 | SR | W–L | Win % |
|---|---|---|---|---|---|---|---|---|---|---|---|---|---|---|
Grand Slam tournaments
| Australian Open | A | A | A | A | A | 2R | 3R | 1R | 1R | A | A | 0 / 4 | 3–4 | 43% |
| French Open | A | A | A | A | 2R | 1R | 3R | 3R | 1R | A | A | 0 / 5 | 5–5 | 50% |
| Wimbledon | A | A | A | A | Q3 | NH | 2R | 2R | 3R | A | A | 0 / 3 | 4–3 | 57% |
| US Open | A | A | A | A | Q3 | 1R | 1R | 1R | A | A | A | 0 / 3 | 0–3 | 0% |
| Win–Loss | 0–0 | 0–0 | 0–0 | 0–0 | 1–1 | 1–3 | 5–4 | 3–4 | 2–3 | 0–0 | 0–0 | 0 / 15 | 12–15 | 44% |
National representation
| Davis Cup | Z1 | Z1 | Z2 | Z1 | Z1 | QF | | RR | QR | A | Q1 | 0 / 2 | 16–8 | 67% |
ATP Masters 1000
| Indian Wells Open | A | A | A | A | A | NH | A | A | 1R | A | A | 0 / 1 | 0–1 | 0% |
| Miami Open | A | A | 1R | 2R | 1R | NH | 3R | A | 1R | A | Q1 | 0 / 5 | 3–5 | 38% |
| Monte-Carlo Masters | A | A | A | A | A | NH | A | Q1 | A | A | A | 0 / 0 | 0–0 | – |
| Madrid Open | A | A | A | A | A | NH | A | A | A | A | A | 0 / 0 | 0–0 | – |
| Italian Open | A | A | A | A | A | Q3 | A | A | A | A | A | 0 / 0 | 0–0 | – |
| Canadian Open | A | A | A | A | A | NH | A | A | A | A | A | 0 / 0 | 0–0 | – |
| Cincinnati Open | A | A | A | A | A | Q1 | A | A | A | A | A | 0 / 0 | 0–0 | – |
| Shanghai Masters | A | A | A | A | A | NH | | | A | A | A | 0 / 0 | 0–0 | – |
| Paris Masters | A | A | A | A | Q1 | A | 1R | 2R | A | A | A | 0 / 2 | 1–2 | 33% |
| Win–Loss | 0–0 | 0–0 | 0–1 | 1–1 | 0–1 | 0–0 | 2–2 | 1–1 | 0–2 | 0–0 | 0–0 | 0 / 8 | 4–8 | 33% |
Career statistics
| | 2015 | 2016 | 2017 | 2018 | 2019 | 2020 | 2021 | 2022 | 2023 | 2024 | 2025 | Career | | |
| Tournaments | 1 | 1 | 5 | 3 | 4 | 7 | 18 | 18 | 15 | 0 | 2 | 74 | | |
| Titles | 0 | 0 | 0 | 0 | 0 | 0 | 0 | 0 | 0 | 0 | 0 | 0 | | |
| Finals | 0 | 0 | 0 | 0 | 0 | 0 | 1 | 0 | 0 | 0 | 0 | 1 | | |
| Win–Loss | 2–1 | 1–3 | 2–5 | 5–4 | 6–7 | 6–7 | 18–20 | 23–19 | 11–15 | 0–0 | 0–3 | 74–84 | | |
| Win % | 67% | 25% | 29% | 56% | 46% | 46% | 47% | 55% | 42% | – | 0% | 47% | | |
| Year-end ranking | 596 | 497 | 417 | 255 | 74 | 94 | 93 | 71 | 136 | – | | | | |

=== Doubles ===
| Tournament | 2016 | 2017 | 2018 | 2019 | 2020 | 2021 | 2022 | 2023 | Career |
|---|---|---|---|---|---|---|---|---|---|
Career statistics
| Tournaments | 1 | 3 | 2 | 1 | 0 | 0 | 2 | 0 | 9 |
| Titles | 1 | 0 | 0 | 0 | 0 | 0 | 0 | 0 | 1 |
| Finals | 1 | 0 | 0 | 0 | 0 | 0 | 0 | 0 | 1 |
| Overall Win–Loss | 4–0 | 2–3 | 0–2 | 0–2 | 0–0 | 0–0 | 1–2 | 0–0 | 7–9 |
| Year-end ranking | 276 | 496 | N/A | 1055 | 1108 | 1463 | 822 | – | |

== ATP career finals ==
=== Singles: 1 (1 runner-up) ===
| Legend Grand Slam (0–0) ATP Masters 1000 (0–0) ATP 500 Series (0–0) ATP 250 Series (0–1) | Finals by surface Hard (0–1) Clay (0–0) Grass (0–0) | Titles by setting Outdoor (0–1) Indoor (0–0) |

| Result | W–L | Date | Tournament | Tier | Surface | Opponent | Score |
|---|---|---|---|---|---|---|---|
| Loss | 0–1 | Aug 2021 | Winston-Salem Open, United States | 250 Series | Hard | (Belarus) Ilya Ivashka | 0–6, 2–6 |

=== Doubles: 1 (1 title) ===
| Legend Grand Slam (0–0) ATP Masters 1000 (0–0) ATP 500 Series (0–0) ATP 250 Series (1–0) | Finals by surface Hard (1–0) Clay (0–0) Grass (0–0) |

| Result | W–L | Date | Tournament | Tier | Surface | Partner | Opponents | Score |
|---|---|---|---|---|---|---|---|---|
| Win | 1–0 | Oct 2016 | Stockholm Open, Sweden | 250 Series | Hard (i) | (Sweden) Elias Ymer | (Croatia) Mate Pavić (New Zealand) Michael Venus | 6–1, 6–1 |

== ATP Challenger and ITF Futures finals ==
=== Singles: 11 (7–4) ===
| Legend ATP Challenger (4–3) ITF Futures (3–1) | Finals by surface Hard (5–2) Clay (2–2) Grass (0–0) Carpet (0–0) |

| Result | W–L | Date | Tournament | Tier | Surface | Opponent | Score |
|---|---|---|---|---|---|---|---|
| Win | 1–0 | May 2015 | Sweden F3, Båstad | Futures | Clay | (Romania) Dragoș Nicolae Mădăraș | 2–6, 6–1, 6–2 |
| Loss | 1–1 | Sep 2015 | Sweden F5, Danderyd | Futures | Hard (i) | (United Kingdom) Joe Salisbury | 6–7^{(3–7)}, 6–3, 3–6 |
| Win | 2–1 | Feb 2017 | France F4, Lille | Futures | Hard (i) | (Netherlands) Botic van de Zandschulp | 6–2, 6–3 |
| Win | 3–1 | Jan 2019 | Nouméa, New Caledonia | Challenger | Hard | (United States) Noah Rubin | 6–3, 6–3 |
| Loss | 3–2 | April 2019 | Murcia, Spain | Challenger | Clay | (Spain) Roberto Carballés Baena | 6–2, 0–6, 2–6 |
| Loss | 3–3 | May 2019 | Bordeaux, France | Challenger | Clay | (France) Lucas Pouille | 3–6, 3–6 |
| Win | 4–3 | July 2019 | Tampere, Finland | Challenger | Clay | (Netherlands) Tallon Griekspoor | 6–3, 5–7, 6–3 |
| Win | 5–3 | Sep 2019 | Orléans, France | Challenger | Hard (i) | (France) Grégoire Barrère | 6–3, 7–5 |
| Win | 6–3 | Oct 2019 | Mouilleron-le-Captif, France | Challenger | Hard (i) | (France) Mathias Bourgue | 6–1, 6–4 |
| Loss | 6–4 | Jan 2023 | Ottignies-Louvain-la-Neuve, Belgium | Challenger | Hard (i) | (Belgium) David Goffin | 4–6, 1–6 |
| Win | 7–4 | Jan 2025 | M25 Esch-sur-Alzette, Luxembourg | WTT | Hard (i) | (Norway) Nicolai Budkov Kjær | 6–1, 5–7, 6–2 |

=== Doubles: 1 (0–1) ===
| Legend ATP Challenger (0–0) ITF Futures (0–1) | Finals by surface Hard (0–0) Clay (0–1) Grass (0–0) Carpet (0–0) |

| Result | W–L | Date | Tournament | Tier | Surface | Partner | Opponents | Score |
|---|---|---|---|---|---|---|---|---|
| Loss | 0–1 | May 2015 | Sweden F2, Båstad | Futures | Clay | (Sweden) Daniel Appelgren | (Sweden) Jonathan Mridha (Sweden) Fred Simonsson | 1–6, 7–6^{(7–5)}, [7–10] |

== Junior Grand Slam finals ==
=== Boys' Singles: 1 (1 runner–up) ===
| Result | Year | Tournament | Surface | Opponent | Score |
|---|---|---|---|---|---|
| Loss | 2015 | Wimbledon | Grass | (United States) Reilly Opelka | 6–7^{(5–7)}, 4–6 |

== Record against top 10 players ==
Ymer's record against those who have been ranked in the top 10, with active players in boldface.

| Player | Years | MP | Record | Win % | Hard | Clay | Grass | Last match |
|---|---|---|---|---|---|---|---|---|
| Number 1 ranked players | | | | | | | | |
| (Italy) **Jannik Sinner** | 2019–22 | 5 | 2–3 | 40% | 2–1 | 0–1 | 0–1 | Win (6–4, 3–6, 6–3) at 2022 Davis Cup |
| (Spain) **Carlos Alcaraz** | 2021 | 2 | 2–0 | 100% | 2–0 | – | – | Win (7–5, 6–3) at 2021 Winston-Salem |
| (United Kingdom) Andy Murray | 2022 | 1 | 1–0 | 100% | 1–0 | – | – | Win (7–6^{(10–8)}, 4–6, 6–1) at 2022 Washington, D.C. |
| (Russia) **Daniil Medvedev** | 2021 | 1 | 0–1 | 0% | 0–1 | – | – | Loss (4–6, 4–6) at 2021 Davis Cup Finals |
| (Serbia) **Novak Djokovic** | 2020 | 1 | 0–1 | 0% | – | 0–1 | – | Loss (0–6, 2–6, 3–6) at 2020 French Open |
| Number 2 ranked players | | | | | | | | |
| (Norway) **Casper Ruud** | 2021 | 1 | 0–1 | 0% | – | 0–1 | – | Loss (6–3, 6–7^{(5–7)}, 1–6) at 2021 Kitzbühel |
| (Germany) **Alexander Zverev** | 2015–22 | 3 | 0–3 | 0% | 0–2 | 0–1 | – | Loss (1–6, 3–6) at 2022 Montpellier |
| Number 3 ranked players | | | | | | | | |
| (Canada) Milos Raonic | 2018 | 1 | 0–1 | 0% | 0–1 | – | – | Loss (3–6, 3–6) at 2018 Miami |
| (Switzerland) **Stan Wawrinka** | 2022 | 1 | 0–1 | 0% | 0–1 | – | – | Loss (4–6, 6–4, 6–7^{(5–7)}) at 2022 Metz |
| (Greece) **Stefanos Tsitsipas** | 2020–22 | 5 | 0–5 | 0% | 0–4 | 0–1 | – | Loss (5–7, 3–6) at 2022 Stockholm |
| Number 5 ranked players | | | | | | | | |
| (United States) **Taylor Fritz** | 2023 | 1 | 1–0 | 100% | – | – | 1–0 | Win (3–6, 2–6, 6–3, 6–4, 6–2) at 2023 Wimbledon |
| (France) Jo-Wilfried Tsonga | 2021 | 1 | 1–0 | 100% | – | – | 1–0 | Win (7–5, 6–7^{(4–7)}, 5–7, 6–4, 6–3) at 2021 Wimbledon |
| Number 6 ranked players | | | | | | | | |
| (France) **Gaël Monfils** | 2021–22 | 2 | 2–0 | 100% | 1–0 | 1–0 | – | Win (6–1, 6–2) at 2022 Montpellier |
| (Canada) **Félix Auger-Aliassime** | 2021–22 | 2 | 0–2 | 0% | 0–1 | – | 0–1 | Loss (7–6^{(8–6)}, 4–6, 6–7^{(6–8)}) at 2022 Paris Masters |
| Number 7 ranked players | | | | | | | | |
| (Spain) Fernando Verdasco | 2016 | 1 | 1–0 | 100% | 1–0 | – | – | Win (6–2, 6–1) at 2016 Stockholm |
| (France) Richard Gasquet | 2020–23 | 4 | 3–1 | 75% | 2–1 | 1–0 | – | Win (6–3, 7–5) at 2023 Lyon |
| Number 8 ranked players | | | | | | | | |
| (Argentina) Diego Schwartzman | 2022 | 1 | 1–0 | 100% | 1–0 | – | – | Win (6–2, 6–2) at 2022 Davis Cup |
| (Russia) **Karen Khachanov** | 2020–21 | 2 | 0–2 | 0% | 0–2 | – | – | Loss (4–6, 5–7) at 2021 Paris Masters |
| Number 9 ranked players | | | | | | | | |
| (Poland) **Hubert Hurkacz** | 2020–23 | 3 | 1–2 | 33% | 1–2 | – | – | Loss (3–6, 6–3, 6–7^{(6–8)}) at 2023 Marseille |
| (Italy) Fabio Fognini | 2018 | 1 | 0–1 | 0% | – | 0–1 | – | Loss (6–1, 4–6, 2–6) at 2018 Båstad |
| Number 10 ranked players | | | | | | | | |
| (United States) **Frances Tiafoe** | 2019–21 | 3 | 2–1 | 67% | 2–1 | – | – | Win (6–7^{(2–7)}, 6–2, 6–3) at 2021 Winston-Salem |
| (Spain) **Pablo Carreño Busta** | 2021 | 1 | 0–1 | 0% | 0–1 | – | – | Loss (5–7, 2–6) at 2021 Metz |
| (Latvia) Ernests Gulbis | 2018 | 1 | 0–1 | 0% | 0–1 | – | – | Loss (4–6, 3–6) at 2018 Stockholm |
| **Total** | 2015–23 | 44 | 17–27 | 39% | 13–19 (41%) | 2–6 (25%) | 2–2 (50%) | Statistics correct as of 6 July 2023. |

=== Wins over top 10 players ===
- He has a 1–10 record against players who were, at the time the match was played, ranked in the top 10.

| Season | 2015 | 2016 | 2017 | 2018 | 2019 | 2020 | 2021 | 2022 | 2023 | **Total** |
| Wins | 0 | 0 | 0 | 0 | 0 | 0 | 0 | 0 | 1 | **1** |

| # | Player | Rank | Event | Surface | Rd | Score | MYR |
|---|---|---|---|---|---|---|---|
**2023**
| 1. | (United States) Taylor Fritz | 9 | Wimbledon, United Kingdom | Grass | 2R | 3–6, 2–6, 6–3, 6–4, 6–2 | 59 |
