= Tom Paris (tennis) =

French tennis player (born 2002)

- Country (sports): France
- Born: 2 September 2002 (age 24) Chalon-sur-Saône
- Height: 193 cm (6 ft 4 in)
- Plays: Right-handed, one-handed backhand
- Coach: Antoine Pastrana
- Prize money: $87,514

Singles
- Career record: 0–0
- Career titles: 0
- Highest ranking: No. 252 (17 November 2025)
- Current ranking: No. 330 (23 February 2026)

Doubles
- Career record: 0–1
- Career titles: 0
- Highest ranking: No. 877 (23 February 2026)
- Current ranking: No. 877 (23 February 2026)
- Last updated on: 23 February 2026.

Tom Paris (born 2 September 2002) is a French tennis player. He has a career high singles ranking of No. 252 achieved on 17 November 2025 and a doubles ranking of No. 877 achieved on 23 February 2026.

== Early life ==
Paris was immersed in tennis from a young age with his first coach being his father Christophe Paris, a former tennis player who played at regional level, being the head of the Pontcharra-sur-Turdine tennis club. Paris is a member of Charbonnières-les-Bains Tennis Club. As a youngster he trained at a tennis centre in Poitiers which has alumni including Jo-Wilfried Tsonga, Gilles Simon and Nicolas Escudé.

== Career ==
=== 2023: Maiden ITF title ===
In October 2023, Paris won his first ITF title defeating top seed Dan Added in the semifinal and defeating Alexey Vatutin in the final in Sarreguemines, France.

=== 2024: ATP Tour doubles debut ===
Paris received a wildcard for his ATP Tour debut into the doubles at the 2024 ATP Lyon Open, alongside Tristan Lamasine.

=== 2025: Top 300 ===
In June, Paris reached his first Challenger semifinal at the 2025 Ion Țiriac Challenger, as a lucky loser, but lost to Francesco Maestrelli. As a result he entered the top 350 on 14 July 2025.

== Performance timeline ==
Tournament	2025	SR	W–L	Win%
Grand Slam tournaments
Australian Open	A	0 / 0	0–0	–
French Open	A	0 / 0	0–0	–
Wimbledon	A	0 / 0	0–0	–
US Open	A	0 / 0	0–0	–
Win–loss	0–0	0 / 0	0–0	–

== Challenger and ITF World Tennis Tour finals ==
=== Singles: 7 (5 titles, 2 runner-up) ===
Legend (singles) ATP Challenger Tour (0–0) ITF World Tennis Tour (5–2)	Finals by surface Hard (3–1) Clay (0–0) Grass (0–0) Carpet (2–1)

Result	W–L	Date	Tournament	Tier	Surface	Opponent	Score
Loss	0–1	Oct 2023	M25 Rodez, France	World Tour	Hard	(France) Alexis Gautier	6–7^{(9–11)}, 1–6
Win	1–1	Oct 2023	M25 Sarreguemines, France	World Tour	Carpet	(Russia) Alexey Vatutin	6–2, 6–1
Win	2–1	Nov 2024	M15 Szabolcsveresmart, Hungary	World Tour	Hard	(Sweden) Olle Wallin	6–3, 6–1
Win	3–1	Nov 2024	M15 Alcala de Henares, Spain	World Tour	Hard	(Italy) Pierluigi Basile	6–3, 7–5
Win	4–1	Jan 2025	M25 Nussloch, Germany	World Tour	Carpet	(Ukraine) Oleg Prihodko	6–4, 6–4
Win	5–1	Aug 2025	M25 Idanha-a-Nova, Portugal	World Tour	Hard	(United States) Andrew Fenty	6–3, 6–4
Loss	5–2	Oct 2025	M25 Sarreguemines, France	World Tour	Carpet	(France) Matt Ponchet	7–6^{(7–3)}, 4–6, 4–6
