= All In Open =

- 2025 All In Open

ATP Challenger Tour
- Event name: All In Open Auvergne-Rhône-Alpes de Décines
- Location: Décines-Charpieu, Metropolis of Lyon, France
- Category: ATP Challenger Tour
- Surface: Hard (indoor)
- Prize money: €91,250 (2025), 74,825
- Website: website

The All In Open Auvergne-Rhône-Alpes de Décines is a professional tennis tournament played on indoor hardcourts. It is currently part of the ATP Challenger Tour. It was first held in Décines, France in 2024.

== Past finals ==
=== Singles ===
Year	Champion	Runner-up	Score
2025	(Germany) Jan-Lennard Struff	(United Kingdom) Liam Broady	6–4, 6–4
2024	(Belgium) Raphaël Collignon	(France) Calvin Hemery	6–4, 6–2

=== Doubles ===
Year	Champions	Runners-up	Score
2025	(Ecuador) Diego Hidalgo (United States) Patrik Trhac	(India) Sriram Balaji (Germany) Hendrik Jebens	6–3, 6–4
2024	(United Kingdom) Luke Johnson (Austria) Lucas Miedler	(Spain) Sergio Martos Gornés (Austria) David Pichler	6–1, 6–2
