= BW Open =

ATP Challenger Tour
- Event name: BW Open
- Location: Ottignies-Louvain-la-Neuve, Belgium
- Venue: Complexe Sportif de Blocry
- Category: ATP Challenger Tour 125
- Surface: Hard (indoor)
- Prize money: €148,625

The BW Open was a professional tennis tournament played on indoor hardcourts. It was part of the Association of Tennis Professionals (ATP) Challenger Tour. It was first held in Ottignies-Louvain-la-Neuve, Belgium in 2023. The event was cancelled on the 2025 calendar.

== Past finals ==
=== Singles ===
Year	Champion	Runner-up	Score
2025	Not held		
2024	(Switzerland) Leandro Riedi	(Croatia) Borna Ćorić	7–5, 6–2
2023	(Belgium) David Goffin	(Sweden) Mikael Ymer	6–4, 6–1

=== Doubles ===
Year	Champions	Runners-up	Score
2025	Not held		
2024	(United Kingdom) Luke Johnson (Tunisia) Skander Mansouri	(Netherlands) Sander Arends (Netherlands) Sem Verbeek	7–5, 6–3
2023	(Monaco) Romain Arneodo (Austria) Tristan-Samuel Weissborn	(Czech Republic) Roman Jebavý (Czech Republic) Adam Pavlásek	6–4, 6–3
