= Luke Johnson (tennis) =

British tennis player (born 1994)

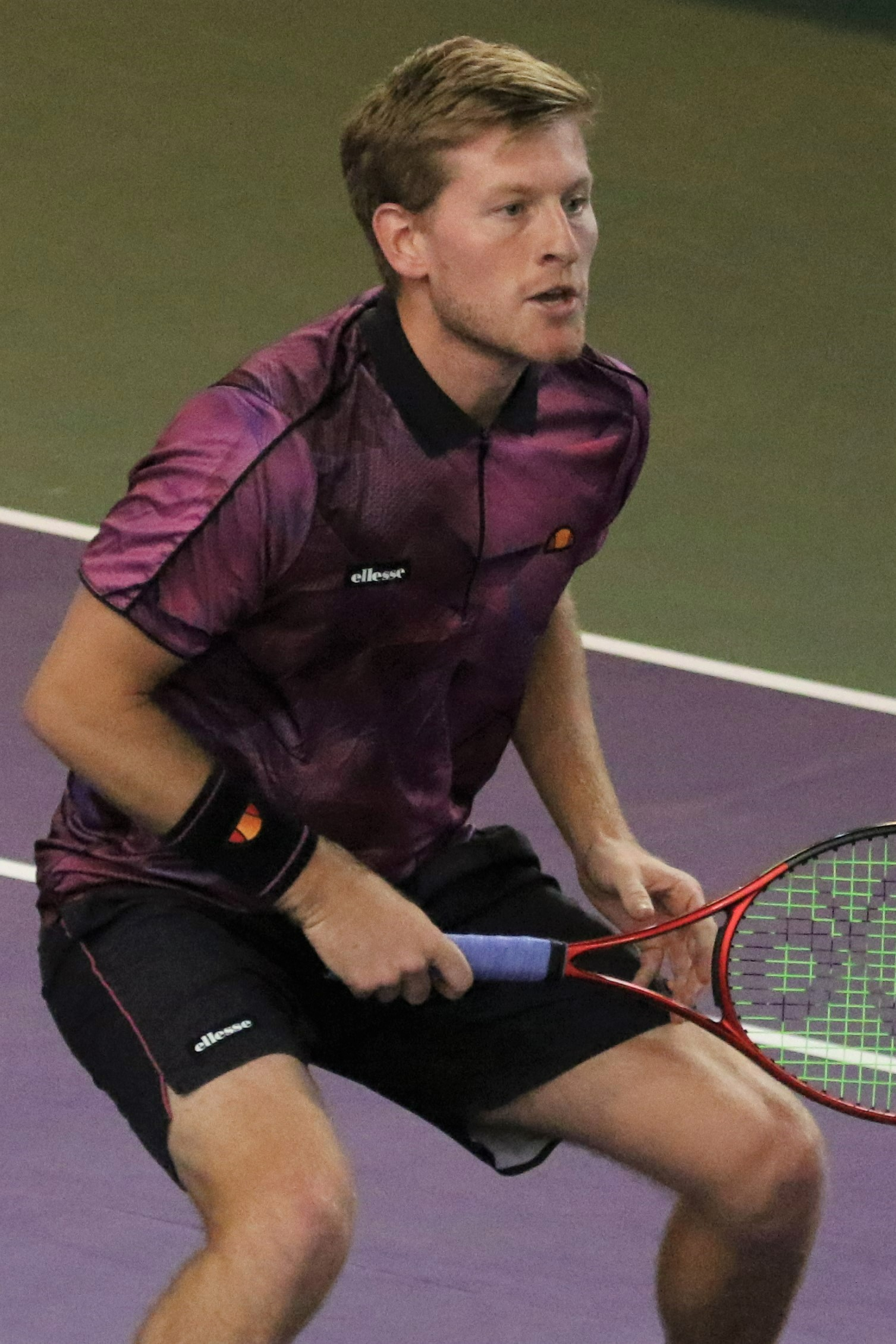
- Johnson at the 2022 Internationaux de Tennis de Vendée
- Country (sports): Great Britain
- Residence: Leeds, Yorkshire, England, UK
- Born: 18 March 1994 (age 32) Leeds, Yorkshire, England, UK
- Height: 1.83 m (6 ft 0 in)
- Plays: Right-handed (two-handed backhand)
- Coach: Calvin Betton (2023-)
- Prize money: US 890,715

Singles
- Career record: 0–0
- Career titles: 0
- Highest ranking: No. 606 (29 November 2021)

Doubles
- Career record: 46–52
- Career titles: 4
- Highest ranking: No. 25 (2 March 2026)
- Current ranking: No. 44 (29 September 2026)

Grand Slam doubles results
- Australian Open: SF (2026)
- French Open: QF (2025)
- Wimbledon: 1R (2019, 2021, 2023, 2024, 2026)
- US Open: 2R (2025)

Mixed doubles
- Career record: 0–3
- Career titles: 0

Grand Slam mixed doubles results
- Australian Open: 1R (2026)
- Wimbledon: 1R (2024, 2026)
Medal record
Men's Tennis
Representing Great Britain
Summer Universiade
Silver medal – second place	2017 Taipei	Men's Doubles
- Last updated on: 29 September 2026.

Luke Johnson (born 18 March 1994) is a British professional tennis player who specializes in doubles. He achieved his career-high ATP doubles ranking of world No. 25 on 2 March 2026 and a career-high singles ranking of No. 606 achieved on 29 November 2021. Johnson has won four doubles titles on the ATP Tour, three with Sander Arends and one with Jan Zieliński. He has also won 13 titles on the ATP Challenger Tour and 21 on the ITF World Tennis Tour.

== Personal life ==
Johnson grew up in the Leeds suburb of Roundhay and attended The Grammar School at Leeds. He played cricket up until the age of 16 but then decided to focus exclusively on tennis.

He moved to the United States for his higher education and played tennis for Clemson University.

== Career ==
=== 2019: Grand Slam tournament debut ===
Johnson made his ATP Tour and Grand Slam tournament main draw debut simultaneously at the Wimbledon after receiving a wildcard for direct entry into the men's doubles draw. Partnering compatriot Evan Hoyt, the pair were defeated in the first round by Nicholas Monroe and Mischa Zverev.

=== 2024: First ATP Title, top 100 ===
Johnson reached the top 100 in the rankings at world No. 83 on 29 January 2024 when he won a ATP Challenger Tour title at the BW Open with Skander Mansouri.

At the back end of the 2024 season, Johnson won his 10th Challenger doubles title at the Porto Open and his sixth of the season, at the Saint-Tropez Open, playing alongside Sander Arends.

Once again partnering Arends, Johnson won his first ATP Tour level doubles title at the last tournament of the season at the Moselle Open, defeating Pierre-Hugues Herbert and Albano Olivetti in the final. The following week he was back on the ATP Challenger Tour and won his 12th career title and seventh of the season at the All In Open in Lyon, partnering Lucas Miedler to a straight sets win over Sergio Martos Gornés and David Pichler in the final. He ended the year inside the top 60 rankings with a career highest rank of No. 58 on 30 December 2024.

=== 2025: ATP 500 title, broken wrist ===
Reuniting with Sander Arends, Johnson won the doubles title at the Hong Kong Open, defeating Karen Khachanov and Andrey Rublev in the final. Johnson reached the top 50 on 31 March 2025, following reaching the semifinals with Arends at the Open Occitanie in Montpellier, France and the quarterfinals in Dallas, Texas.

In April, Johnson and Arends won their second ATP title of the season and first at the ATP 500 level, at the Barcelona Open, defeating fellow Brits and former world No. 1 players Joe Salisbury and Neal Skupski in the final.

At the French Open, Johnson and Arends reached the quarterfinals, losing to Hugo Nys and Edouard Roger-Vasselin. Johnson suffered a broken wrist when he fell during qualifying at the Queen's Club Championships in June, forcing him to withdraw from Wimbledon.

=== 2026: Australian Open semifinal ===
Partnering Jan Zieliński, Johnson reached the semifinals at the Australian Open, defeating fourth seeds Marcelo Arévalo and Mate Pavić in the quarterfinals, before losing in the last four to wildcard entrants Jason Kubler and Marc Polmans in three sets. In September, despite arriving at the tournament on a seven match losing streak, they won the Chengdu Open, defeating fourth seeds Robert Galloway and André Göransson in the final.

== Doubles performance timeline ==
Key
W	F	SF	QF	#R	RR	Q#	DNQ	A	NH

(W) winner; (F) finalist; (SF) semifinalist; (QF) quarterfinalist; (#R) rounds 4, 3, 2, 1; (RR) round-robin stage; (Q#) qualification round; (DNQ) did not qualify; (A) absent; (NH) not held; (SR) strike rate (events won / competed); (W–L) win–loss record.
To avoid confusion and double counting, these charts are updated at the conclusion of a tournament or when the player's participation has ended.

=== Men's doubles ===
Current through the 2026 US Open.

Tournament	2019	2020	2021	2022	2023	2024	2025	2026	SR	W–L
Grand Slam tournaments
Australian Open	A	A	A	A	A	A	2R	SF	0 / 2	5–2
French Open	A	A	A	A	A	2R	QF	A	0 / 2	4–2
Wimbledon	1R	NH	1R	A	1R	1R	A	1R	0 / 5	0–5
US Open	A	A	A	A	A	1R	2R	1R	0 / 3	1–3
Win–loss	0–1	0–0	0–1	0–0	0–1	1–3	5–3	4–3	0 / 12	10–12
ATP Tour Masters 1000
Indian Wells Open	A	A	A	A	A	A	A	1R	0 / 1	0–1
Miami Open	A	A	A	A	A	A	A	1R	0 / 1	0–1
Monte Carlo Masters	A	A	A	A	A	A	A	1R	0 / 1	0–1
Madrid Open	A	A	A	A	A	A	1R	SF	0 / 2	3–2
Italian Open	A	A	A	A	A	A	2R	A	0 / 1	1–1
Canadian Open	A	A	A	A	A	A	A	A	0 / 0	0–0
Cincinnati Masters	A	A	A	A	A	A	A	1R	0 / 1	0–1
Shanghai Masters	A	A	A	A	A	A	1R		0 / 1	0–1
Paris Masters	A	A	A	A	A	A	1R		0 / 1	0–1
Win–loss	0–0	0–0	0–0	0–0	0–0	0–0	1–4	3–5	0 / 9	4–9
Career statistics
Tournaments	1	0	2	0	3	8	22	3	39	
Titles	0	0	0	0	0	1	2	0	3	
Finals	0	0	0	0	0	1	2	0	3	
Overall win–loss	0–1	0–0	0–2	0–0	0–3	7–7	23–20	6–3	36–36	
Win %	0%	0%	0%	0%	0%	50%	53%	67%	50%	
Year-end ranking	339	392	375	215	117	58	37			

=== Mixed doubles ===
Tournament	2024	2025	2026	SR	W–L
Australian Open	A	A	1R	0 / 1	0–1
French Open	A	A	A	0 / 0	0–0
Wimbledon	1R	A	1R	0 / 2	0–2
US Open	A	A	A	0 / 0	0–0
Win–loss	0–1	0–0	0–2	0 / 3	0–3

== ATP career finals ==
=== Doubles: 4 (4 titles) ===
Legend Grand Slam (0–0) ATP Masters 1000 (0–0) ATP 500 Series (1–0) ATP 250 Series (3–0)	Finals by surface Hard (3–0) Clay (1–0) Grass (0–0)	Titles by setting Outdoor (3–0) Indoor (1–0)

Result	W–L	Date	Tournament	Tier	Surface	Partner	Opponents	Score
Win	1–0	Nov 2024	Moselle Open, France	250 Series	Hard (i)	(Netherlands) Sander Arends	(France) Pierre-Hugues Herbert (France) Albano Olivetti	6–4, 3–6, [10–3]
Win	2–0	Jan 2025	Hong Kong Open, Hong Kong	250 Series	Hard	(Netherlands) Sander Arends	Karen Khachanov; Andrey Rublev	7–5, 4–6, [10–7]
Win	3–0	Apr 2025	Barcelona Open, Spain	500 Series	Clay	(Netherlands) Sander Arends	(United Kingdom) Joe Salisbury (United Kingdom) Neal Skupski	6–3, 6–7^{(1–7)}, [10–6]
Win	4–0	Sep 2026	Chengdu Open, China	250 Series	Hard	(Poland) Jan Zieliński	(United States) Robert Galloway (Sweden) André Göransson	7–5, 7–6^{(9–7)}

== ATP Challenger and ITF World Tennis Tour finals ==
=== Doubles: 57 (34–23) ===
Legend ATP Challenger (13–4) ITF World Tennis Tour (21–19)	Finals by surface Hard (23–20) Clay (8–2) Grass (1–1) Carpet (2–0)

Result	W–L	Date	Tournament	Tier	Surface	Partner	Opponents	Score
Loss	0–1	Jan 2017	Turkey F1, Antalya	Futures	Hard	(United Kingdom) Liam Broady	(Norway) Viktor Durasovic (Croatia) Nino Serdarusic	3–6, 3–6
Win	1–1	Feb 2017	Great Britain F3, Shrewsbury	Futures	Hard	(United Kingdom) Scott Clayton	(United Kingdom) Jack Molloy (United Kingdom) Marcus Willis	3–6, 6–4, [10–6]
Loss	1–2	Mar 2017	Greece F1, Heraklion	Futures	Hard	(United Kingdom) Richard Gabb	(Netherlands) Kevin Griekspoor (Netherlands) Tallon Griekspoor	3–6, 4–6
Loss	1–3	Sep 2017	Great Britain F4, Nottingham	Futures	Hard	(Republic of Ireland) Peter Bothwell	(France) Romain Bauvy (France) Jonathan Kanar	3–6, 7–5, [7–10]
Loss	1–4	Sep 2017	Great Britain F5, Roehampton	Futures	Hard	(Republic of Ireland) Peter Bothwell	(Monaco) Lucas Catarina (Switzerland) Adrian Bodmer	2–6, 2–6
Win	2–4	Oct 2017	Israel F13, Ashkelon	Futures	Hard	(United Kingdom) Richard Gabb	(Croatia) F Zvonimir Zgombic (Israel) Alon Elia	6–2, 6–1
Win	3–4	Oct 2017	Israel F14, Kiryat Gat	Futures	Hard	(United Kingdom) Richard Gabb	(Argentina) Matias Franco Descotte (France) Hugo Voljacques	6–4, 7–6^{(7–2)}
Loss	3–5	Nov 2017	Israel F15, Meitar	Futures	Hard	(United Kingdom) Richard Gabb	(Switzerland) Luca Margaroli (France) Yannick Jankovits	6–7^{(4–7)}, 7–6^{(7–4)}, [6–10]
Loss	3–6	Dec 2017	Qatar F4, Doha	Futures	Hard	(United Kingdom) Richard Gabb	(United Kingdom) Ryan Peniston (United Kingdom) Andrew Watson	3–6, 6–7^{(4–7)}
Loss	3–7	Feb 2018	Great Britain F2, Loughborough	Futures	Hard	(United Kingdom) Jack Findel-hawkins	(Finland) Harri Heliovaara (Denmark) Frederik Nielsen	4–6, 1–6
Loss	3–8	Mar 2018	Greece F2, Heraklion	Futures	Hard	(United Kingdom) Jonathan Gray	(Italy) Andrea Guerrieri (Italy) Alessandro Motti	5–7, 3–6
Win	4–8	Aug 2018	Ireland F1, Dublin	Futures	Carpet	(France) Hugo Voljacques	(United Kingdom) Ben Jones (United Kingdom) Joshua Paris	7–6^{(8–6)}, 6–4
Loss	4–9	Sep 2018	Italy F25, Piombino	Futures	Hard	(Sweden) Fred Simonsson	(Germany) Robin Kern (Germany) Sami Reinwein	6–4, 4–6, [6–10]
Win	5–9	Sep 2018	Tunisia F31, Monastir	Futures	Hard	(Germany) Christian Seraphim	(Colombia) J Benitez Chavarriaga (Spain) J Blanco Guadalupe	4–6, 6–2, [10–8]
Win	6–9	Oct 2018	Portugal F22, Tavira	Futures	Hard	(Switzerland) Luca Castelnuovo	(Portugal) Francisco Cabral (Spain) Sergio Martos Gornés	4–6, 7–5, [10–3]
Win	7–9	Dec 2018	Tunisia F43, Monastir	Futures	Hard	(United Kingdom) Evan Hoyt	(Canada) Steven Diez (Italy) Marco Bartolotti	6–4, 6–2
Win	8–9	Feb 2019	M25 Barnstaple, Great Britain	World Tennis Tour	Hard	(United Kingdom) Evan Hoyt	(United Kingdom) Julian Cash (United Kingdom) Andrew Watson	3–6, 7–6^{(7–4)}, [10–6]
Win	9–9	Feb 2019	M25 Glasgow, Great Britain	World Tennis Tour	Hard	(United Kingdom) Evan Hoyt	(United States) Tom Fawcett (United States) Alexander Ritschard	6–1, 7–6^{(8–6)}
Win	10–9	May 2019	M15 Gran Canaria, Spain	World Tennis Tour	Clay	(Brazil) Felipe Meligeni Alves	(Spain) J Pla Malfeito (Netherlands) Michiel De Krom	6–1, 7–6^{(7–3)}
Win	11–9	May 2019	M15 Gran Canaria, Spain	World Tennis Tour	Clay	(Brazil) Felipe Meligeni Alves	(Portugal) Francisco Dias (Netherlands) Michiel De Krom	6–3, 6–7^{(3–7)}, [13–11]
Loss	11–10	May 2019	M15 Irpin, Ukraine	World Tennis Tour	Clay	(Ukraine) Vladyslav Orlov	(Ukraine) Oleg Dolgosheyev (Ukraine) Dmytro Kamynin	3–6, 5–7
Loss	11–11	Aug 2019	M25 Roehampton, Great Britain	World Tennis Tour	Hard	(United Kingdom) Scott Clayton	(United Kingdom) Alastair Gray (United Kingdom) Ewan Moore	3–6, 6–7^{(5–7)}
Loss	11–12	Sep 2019	M15 Piombino, Italy	World Tennis Tour	Hard	(United Kingdom) Ben Jones	(Spain) D Jorda Sanchis (Spain) P Vivero Gonzalez	4–6, 4–6
Loss	11–13	Sep 2019	M15 São Brás de Alportel, Portugal	World Tennis Tour	Hard	(Portugal) Francisco Cabral	(Sweden) Simon Freund (United States) Nicolas Moreno de Alboran	7–5, 4–6, [7–10]
Win	12–13	Nov 2019	M15 Heraklion, Greece	World Tennis Tour	Hard	(Poland) Jan Zielinski	(Switzerland) Adrian Bodmer (Austria) Jonas Trinker	1–6, 6–2, [12–10]
Loss	12–14	Nov 2019	M15 Heraklion, Greece	World Tennis Tour	Hard	(Poland) Jan Zielinski	(Austria) Alexander Erler (Austria) Neil Oberleitner	4–6, 0–6
Win	13–14	Jan 2020	M15 Monastir, Tunisia	World Tennis Tour	Hard	(France) Hugo Voljacques	(Czech Republic) Dominik Langmajer (Czech Republic) Marek Gengel	6–3, 6–2
Loss	13–15	Jan 2020	M15 Monastir, Tunisia	World Tennis Tour	Hard	(France) Hugo Voljacques	(Netherlands) Jesper De Jong (Netherlands) Bart Stevens	4–6, 6–3, [8–10]
Loss	13–16	Feb 2020	M25 Barnstaple, Great Britain	World Tennis Tour	Hard	(United Kingdom) Evan Hoyt	(Poland) Kacper Zuk (Poland) Jan Zielinski	3–6, 6–7^{(5–7)}
Loss	13–17	Apr 2021	M15 Cairo, Egypt	World Tennis Tour	Clay	(Ukraine) Volodymyr Uzhylovskyi	(Italy) Daniele Capecchi (Italy) Francesco Passaro	5–7, 4–6
Win	14–17	May 2021	M15 Troisdorf, Germany	World Tennis Tour	Clay	(France) Dan Added	(Argentina) Juan Ignacio Galarza (Argentina) Juan Pablo Paz	6–4, 6–4
Win	15–17	Aug 2021	M15 Gdynia, Poland	World Tennis Tour	Clay	(United Kingdom) Arthur Fery	(Poland) Michał Mikuła (Poland) Yann Wójcik	6–3, 6–1
Win	16–17	Sep 2021	M15 Forbach, France	World Tennis Tour	Carpet (i)	(United Kingdom) Ben Jones	(France) Maxence Beaugé (France) Arthur Bouquier	6–3, 6–2
Win	17–17	Nov 2021	M15 Ithaca, United States	World Tennis Tour	Hard (i)	(United States) Vasil Kirkov	(Luxembourg) Alex Knaff (Canada) Joshua Peck	7–6^{(7–3)}, 6–3
Loss	17–18	Jan 2022	M25 Bath, United Kingdom	World Tennis Tour	Hard (i)	(Netherlands) Guy den Ouden	(United Kingdom) Charles Broom (United Kingdom) Alastair Gray	2–6, 2–6
Win	18–18	May 2022	M15 Monastir, Tunisia	World Tennis Tour	Hard	(Tunisia) Skander Mansouri	(France) Arthur Bouquier (France) Martin Breysach	7–6^{(7–3)}, 6–3
Win	19–18	Jun 2022	M25 Bakio, Spain	World Tennis Tour	Hard	(Tunisia) Skander Mansouri	(Israel) Aaron Cohen (Spain) Àlex Martínez	1–6, 6–2, [10–5]
Win	20–18	Jul 2022	M25+H Ajaccio, France	World Tennis Tour	Hard	(United Kingdom) Ben Jones	(France) Dan Added (France) Arthur Bouquier	6–2, 6–7^{(1–7)}, [10–8]
Loss	20–19	Jul 2022	M25 Nottingham, United Kingdom	World Tennis Tour	Grass	(United Kingdom) Charles Broom	(United Kingdom) Alastair Gray (United Kingdom) Stuart Parker	6–7^{(4–7)}, 6–4, [5–10]
Win	21–19	Aug 2022	M25 Nottingham, United Kingdom	World Tennis Tour	Grass	(United Kingdom) Charles Broom	(United Kingdom) Ben Jones (United Kingdom) Joe Tyler	6–1, 7–6^{(7–4)}
Loss	21–20	Feb 2023	Tenerife, Spain	Challenger	Hard	(Netherlands) Sem Verbeek	(Australia) Andrew Harris (United States) Christian Harrison	6–7^{(6–8)}, 7–6^{(7–4)}, [8–10]
Win	22–20	Feb 2023	Rome, United States	Challenger	Hard (i)	(Netherlands) Sem Verbeek	(Brazil) Gabriel Décamps (United States) Alex Rybakov	6–2, 6–2
Win	23–20	May 2023	Oeiras, Portugal	Challenger	Clay	(Netherlands) Sem Verbeek	(Portugal) Jaime Faria (Portugal) Henrique Rocha	6–7^{(6–8)}, 7–5, [10–6]
Loss	23–21	Jul 2023	Pozoblanco, Spain	Challenger	Hard	(Zimbabwe) Benjamin Lock	(South Korea) Nam Ji-sung (South Korea) Song Min-kyu	6–2, 4–6, [8–10]
Win	24–21	Sep 2023	Istanbul, Turkey	Challenger	Hard	(Tunisia) Skander Mansouri	(Netherlands) Sander Arends (Pakistan) Aisam-ul-Haq Qureshi	7–6^{(7–3)}, 6–3
Win	25–21	Oct 2023	Charleston, USA	Challenger	Hard	(Tunisia) Skander Mansouri	(United States) Nicholas Bybel (United States) Oliver Crawford	6–4, 6–4
Win	26–21	Oct 2023	Tiburon, USA	Challenger	Hard	(Tunisia) Skander Mansouri	(United States) William Blumberg (Venezuela) Luis David Martínez	6–2, 6–3
Win	27–21	Jan 2024	Nonthaburi, Thailand	Challenger	Hard	(Tunisia) Skander Mansouri	(India) Rithvik Choudary Bollipalli (India) Niki Kaliyanda Poonacha	7-5, 6–4
Win	28–21	Jan 2024	Ottignies-Louvain-la-Neuve, Belgium	Challenger	Hard (i)	(Tunisia) Skander Mansouri	(Netherlands) Sander Arends (Netherlands) Sem Verbeek	7-5, 6–3
Loss	28–22	Apr 2024	León, Mexico	Challenger	Hard	(Tunisia) Skander Mansouri	(India) Rithvik Choudary Bollipalli (India) Niki Kaliyanda Poonacha	6–7^{(4–7)}, 5–7
Win	29–22	Apr 2024	Rome, Italy	Challenger	Clay	(Tunisia) Skander Mansouri	(Italy) Lorenzo Rottoli (Italy) Samuel Vincent Ruggeri	6-2, 6–4
Win	30–22	May 2024	Aix-en-Provence, France	Challenger	Clay	(Tunisia) Skander Mansouri	(Ecuador) Diego Hidalgo (Colombia) Cristian Rodríguez	6-3, 6–3
Win	31–22	Aug 2024	Porto, Portugal	Challenger	Hard	(Netherlands) Sander Arends	(United Kingdom) Joshua Paris (India) Ramkumar Ramanathan	6-3, 6–2
Loss	31–23	Aug 2024	Lincoln, USA	Challenger	Hard	(Uruguay) Ariel Behar	(United States) Robert Cash (United States) JJ Tracy	6–7^{(6–8)}, 3–6
Win	32–23	Sep 2024	Saint-Tropez, France	Challenger	Hard	(Netherlands) Sander Arends	(Sweden) André Göransson (Netherlands) Sem Verbeek	3–6, 6–3, [10–4]
Win	33–23	Nov 2024	Lyon, France	Challenger	Hard (i)	(Austria) Lucas Miedler	(Spain) Sergio Martos Gornés (Austria) David Pichler	6–1, 6–2
Win	34–23	Apr 2025	Monza Open, Italy	Challenger	Clay	(Netherlands) Sander Arends	(Italy) Filippo Romano (Italy) Jacopo Vasamì	6–1, 6–1
