= 2011 TEAN International – Men's singles =

Men's singles
- 2011 TEAN International

Final
- Champion: (Netherlands) Igor Sijsling
- Runner-up: (Germany) Jan-Lennard Struff
- Score: 7–6^{(7–2)}, 6–3

Events
Singles	men	women
Doubles	men	women
← 2010 ·	TEAN International	· 2012 →

„”

Jesse Huta Galung was the defending champion. He was supposed to play in the main draw, but withdrew before his match against Alban Meuffels. Marek Michalička replaced him and reached the semifinals, where he lost to eventual champion Igor Sijsling. The Dutch player defeated Jan-Lennard Struff 7–6^{(7–2)}, 6–3 in the final.

== Seeds ==
1. (France) Éric Prodon (second round)
2. (Netherlands) Thomas Schoorel (second round)
3. (Slovenia) Grega Žemlja (second round)
4. (Germany) Simon Greul (first round)
5. (France) Augustin Gensse (semifinals)
6. (Netherlands) Thiemo de Bakker (quarterfinals)
7. (Netherlands) Jesse Huta Galung (first round)
8. (France) David Guez (first round)

== Draw ==
=== Key ===
- Q = Qualifier
- WC = Wild card
- LL = Lucky loser
- Alt = Alternate
- ITF = ITF entry
- PR = Protected ranking
- SR = Special ranking
- SE = Special exempt
- JE = Junior exempt
- JR = Junior Accelerator Programme entrant
- CO = College Accelerator Programme entrant
- NG = Next Gen Accelerator Program entrant
- w/o = Walkover
- r = Retired
- d = Defaulted

=== Finals ===
Semifinals
(Netherlands) Igor Sijsling	2	7^{7}	6
LL	(Czech Republic) Marek Michalička	6	6^{4}	3
(Germany) Jan-Lennard Struff	6	6
5	(France) Augustin Gensse	1	4

Final
(Netherlands) Igor Sijsling	7^{7}	6
(Germany) Jan-Lennard Struff	6^{2}	3

=== Top half ===
First round
1	(France) É Prodon	7^{7}	6^{2}	6
(Netherlands) M Middelkoop	6^{4}	7^{7}	2
(Netherlands) I Sijsling	6	7^{7}
(France) J Dasnières de Veigy	3	6^{4}
(France) Laurent Rochette	1	2
(Kazakhstan) E Korolev	6	6
WC	(Netherlands) B Westerhof	4	3
6	(Netherlands) T de Bakker	6	6
4	(Germany) S Greul	1	6	6^{5}
(Germany) B Knittel	6	2	7^{7}
(France) J Eysseric	2	7^{8}	6
(Slovakia) P Červenák	6	6^{6}	2
WC	(Netherlands) N van der Meer	6	6
(Germany) Alexander Flock	3	4
WC	(Netherlands) Alban Meuffels	6^{5}	4
LL	(Czech Republic) M Michalička	7^{7}	6

Second round
1	(France) É Prodon	2	6^{5}
(Netherlands) I Sijsling	6	7^{7}
(Kazakhstan) E Korolev	4	1
6	(Netherlands) T de Bakker	6	6
(Germany) B Knittel	0	2
(France) J Eysseric	6	6
WC	(Netherlands) N van der Meer	5	2
LL	(Czech Republic) M Michalička	7	6

Quarterfinals
(Netherlands) I Sijsling	3	6	7^{7}
6	(Netherlands) T de Bakker	6	3	6^{4}
(France) J Eysseric	6^{7}	4
LL	(Czech Republic) M Michalička	7^{9}	6

Semifinals
(Netherlands) I Sijsling	2	7^{7}	6
LL	(Czech Republic) M Michalička	6	6^{4}	3

=== Bottom half ===
First round
8	(France) D Guez	1	0
(Germany) J-L Struff	6	6
Q	(Netherlands) Lennert van der Linden	6	1	6^{0}
Q	(Belgium) Alexandre Folie	4	6	7^{7}
(Belgium) Y Mertens	3	6^{4}
(Czech Republic) J Mertl	6	7^{7}
Q	(Czech Republic) R Vögeli	4	5
3	(Slovenia) G Žemlja	6	7
5	(France) A Gensse	4	7	6
WC	(Netherlands) A van der Duim	6	5	2
(Hungary) A Balázs	2	2
Q	(Republic of Ireland) J McGee	6	6
(Belgium) M Authom	3	6	6
(Italy) A Arnaboldi	6	4	3
(France) A Michon	7^{7}	3	4
2	(Netherlands) T Schoorel	6^{5}	6	6

Second round
(Germany) J-L Struff	3	6	6
Q	(Belgium) A Folie	6	1	2
(Czech Republic) J Mertl	6	7
3	(Slovenia) G Žemlja	3	5
5	(France) A Gensse	2	6	6
Q	(Republic of Ireland) J McGee	6	4	2
(Belgium) M Authom	3	7	6
2	(Netherlands) T Schoorel	6	5	1

Quarterfinals
(Germany) J-L Struff	6	6
(Czech Republic) J Mertl	4	2
5	(France) A Gensse	6	7^{7}
(Belgium) M Authom	2	6^{4}

Semifinals
(Germany) J-L Struff	6	6
5	(France) A Gensse	1	4
