= 2011 TEAN International =

Professional tennis tournament played on hard courts

- Date: 5–11 September
- Edition: 16th (men); 11th (women)
- Location: Alphen aan den Rijn, Netherlands

Champions

Men's singles
- (Netherlands) Igor Sijsling

Women's singles
- (Liechtenstein) Stephanie Vogt

Men's doubles
- (Netherlands) Thiemo de Bakker / (Netherlands) Antal van der Duim

Women's doubles
- (Romania) Diana Enache / (Netherlands) Daniëlle Harmsen
← 2010 ·	TEAN International	· 2012 →

The 2011 TEAN International was a professional tennis tournament played on hard courts. It was the 16th edition of the tournament which was part of the 2011 ATP Challenger Tour and the 11th edition of the tournament for the 2011 ITF Women's Circuit. It took place in Alphen aan den Rijn, Netherlands between 5 and 11 September 2011.

== ATP singles main-draw entrants ==
=== Seeds ===
Country	Player	Rank^{1}	Seed
FRA	Éric Prodon	88	1
NED	Thomas Schoorel	117	2
SVN	Grega Žemlja	122	3
GER	Simon Greul	147	4
FRA	Augustin Gensse	155	5
NED	Thiemo de Bakker	159	6
NED	Jesse Huta Galung	160	7
FRA	David Guez	165	8

- ^{1} Rankings are as of August 29, 2011.

=== Other entrants ===
The following players received wildcards into the singles main draw:

- (Netherlands) Alban Meuffels
- (Netherlands) Antal van der Duim
- (Netherlands) Nick van der Meer
- (Netherlands) Boy Westerhof

The following players received entry from the qualifying draw:

- (Belgium) Alexandre Folie
- (Republic of Ireland) James McGee
- (Netherlands) Lennert van der Linden
- (Czech Republic) Roman Vögeli

== WTA entrants ==
=== Seeds ===
Country	Player	Rank^{1}	Seed
GER	Sarah Gronert	197	1
FRA	Alizé Lim	220	2
NED	Bibiane Schoofs	226	3
BRA	Ana Clara Duarte	235	4
FRA	Séverine Beltrame	238	5
LIE	Stephanie Vogt	245	6
FRA	Nathalie Piquion	251	7
BRA	Vivian Segnini	292	8

- ^{1} Rankings are as of August 29, 2011.

=== Other entrants ===
The following players received wildcards into the singles main draw:

- (Netherlands) Daniëlle Harmsen
- (Netherlands) Lesley Kerkhove
- (Netherlands) Angelique van der Meet
- (Netherlands) Kelly Versteeg

The following players received entry from the qualifying draw:

- (Uzbekistan) Albina Khabibulina
- (Russia) Ksenia Kirillova
- (Belarus) Ilona Kremen
- (Germany) Justine Ozga
- (Netherlands) Lisanne van Riet
- (Germany) Carina Witthöft
- (Czech Republic) Zuzana Zálabská
- (Germany) Nina Zander

The following players received entry by a lucky loser spot:

- (Netherlands) Josanne van Bennekom

== Champions ==
=== Men's singles ===
(Netherlands) Igor Sijsling def. (Germany) Jan-Lennard Struff, 7–6^{(7–2)}, 6–3

=== Women's singles ===
(Liechtenstein) Stephanie Vogt def. (Poland) Katarzyna Piter, 6–2, 6–4

=== Men's doubles ===
(Netherlands) Thiemo de Bakker / (Netherlands) Antal van der Duim def. (Netherlands) Matwé Middelkoop / (Netherlands) Igor Sijsling, 6–4, 6–7^{(4–7)}, [10–6]

=== Women's doubles ===
(Romania) Diana Enache / (Netherlands) Daniëlle Harmsen def. (Poland) Katarzyna Piter / (Poland) Barbara Sobaszkiewicz, 6–2, 6–7^{(4–7)}, [11–9]
