= 2013 TEAN International =

Professional tennis tournament

- Date: 2–8 September
- Edition: 18th (men); 13th (women)
- Surface: Clay
- Location: Alphen aan den Rijn, Netherlands

Champions

Men's singles
- (Spain) Daniel Gimeno-Traver

Women's singles
- (Netherlands) Arantxa Rus

Men's doubles
- (Netherlands) Antal van der Duim / (Netherlands) Boy Westerhof

Women's doubles
- (Netherlands) Cindy Burger / (Chile) Daniela Seguel
← 2012 ·	TEAN International	· 2014 →

The 2013 TEAN International was a professional tennis tournament played on outdoor clay courts. It was the 18th edition of the tournament which was part of the 2013 ATP Challenger Tour and the 13th edition of the tournament for the 2013 ITF Women's Circuit. It took place in Alphen aan den Rijn, Netherlands, on 2–8 September 2013.

== ATP singles main draw entrants ==
=== Seeds ===
Country	Player	Rank^{1}	Seed
ESP	Daniel Gimeno-Traver	61	1
ISR	Dudi Sela	77	2
NED	Jesse Huta Galung	98	4
NED	Thiemo de Bakker	99	4
BEL	Olivier Rochus	142	5
BEL	Ruben Bemelmans	154	6
GER	Simon Greul	161	7
BEL	Steve Darcis	164	8

- ^{1} Rankings as of 26 August 2013

=== Other entrants ===
The following players received wildcards into the singles main draw:

- (Netherlands) Thiemo de Bakker
- (Netherlands) Wesley Koolhof
- (Netherlands) Miliaan Niesten
- (Netherlands) Jelle Sels

The following players received entry from the qualifying draw:

- (Germany) Richard Becker
- (Netherlands) Alban Meuffels
- (Czech Republic) Marek Michalička
- (Germany) Peter Torebko

== WTA singles main draw entrants ==
=== Seeds ===
Country	Player	Rank^{1}	Seed
GER	Carina Witthöft	188	1
ARG	María Irigoyen	195	2
NED	Richèl Hogenkamp	197	3
FRA	Irena Pavlovic	201	4
RUS	Valeria Solovyeva	209	5
USA	Julia Cohen	223	6
SUI	Viktorija Golubic	227	7
NED	Lesley Kerkhove	251	8

- ^{1} Rankings as of 26 August 2013

=== Other entrants ===
The following players received wildcards into the singles main draw:

- (Netherlands) Angelique van der Meet
- (Netherlands) Valeria Podda
- (Netherlands) Arantxa Rus
- (Netherlands) Mandy Wagemaker

The following players received entry from the qualifying draw:

- (France) Iryna Brémond
- (Spain) Lucía Cervera Vázquez
- (Germany) Justine Ozga
- (United States) Bernarda Pera
- (Belarus) Sviatlana Pirazhenka
- (Netherlands) Bernice van de Velde
- (Netherlands) Eva Wacanno
- (Netherlands) Monique Zuur

The following player received entry into the singles main draw as a lucky loser:

- (Netherlands) Gabriela van de Graaf

== Champions ==
=== Men's singles ===
- (Spain) Daniel Gimeno-Traver def. (Netherlands) Thomas Schoorel 6–2, 6–4

=== Women's singles ===
- (Netherlands) Arantxa Rus def. (Germany) Carina Witthöft 4–6, 6–2, 6–2

=== Men's doubles ===
- (Netherlands) Antal van der Duim / (Netherlands) Boy Westerhof def. (Germany) Simon Greul / (Netherlands) Wesley Koolhof 4–6, 6–3, [12–10]

=== Women's doubles ===
- (Netherlands) Cindy Burger / (Chile) Daniela Seguel def. (Netherlands) Demi Schuurs / (Netherlands) Eva Wacanno 6–4, 6–1
