= 2014 TEAN International – Men's singles =

Men's singles
- 2014 TEAN International

Final
- Champion: (Netherlands) Jesse Huta Galung
- Runner-up: (Spain) Daniel Muñoz de la Nava
- Score: 6–3, 6–4

Events
Singles	men	women
Doubles	men	women
← 2013 ·	TEAN International	· 2015 →

Jesse Huta Galung won the title, beating Daniel Muñoz de la Nava 6–3, 6–4

== Seeds ==
1. (Netherlands) Robin Haase (second round)
2. (Netherlands) Igor Sijsling (quarterfinals)
3. (Spain) Daniel Gimeno Traver (quarterfinals)
4. (Netherlands) Thiemo de Bakker (first round)
5. (Romania) Victor Hănescu (semifinals)
6. (France) Axel Michon (second round)
7. (Italy) Matteo Viola (first round)
8. (Spain) Roberto Carballés Baena (first round)

== Draw ==
=== Key ===
- Q = Qualifier
- WC = Wild card
- LL = Lucky loser
- Alt = Alternate
- SE = Special exempt
- PR = Protected ranking
- ITF = ITF entry
- JE = Junior exempt
- w/o = Walkover
- r = Retired
- d = Defaulted
- SR = Special ranking

=== Finals ===
Semifinals
(Netherlands) Jesse Huta Galung	6	6
(France) Tristan Lamasine	4	2
5	(Romania) Victor Hănescu	4	3
Alt	(Spain) Daniel Muñoz de la Nava	6	6

Final
(Netherlands) Jesse Huta Galung	6	6
Alt	(Spain) Daniel Muñoz de la Nava	3	4

=== Top half ===
First round
1/WC	(Netherlands) R Haase	6	6
(Spain) R Ramírez Hidalgo	3	1
(Canada) S Diez	0	3
(Netherlands) J Huta Galung	6	6
Q	(Germany) Matthias Wunner	7	3	4
(Netherlands) A van der Duim	5	6	6
(Belgium) Y Mertens	3	1
6	(France) A Michon	6	6
3	(Spain) D Gimeno Traver	6	6^{4}	6
(Italy) M Donati	2	7^{7}	4
(Spain) G Granollers	5	7^{10}	2
(Croatia) T Androić	7	6^{8}	6
(Germany) P Torebko	4	3
Q	(Germany) Moritz Baumann	6	6
(France) T Lamasine	6^{3}	6	6
8	(Spain) R Carballés Baena	7^{7}	1	1

Second round
1/WC	(Netherlands) R Haase	4	6	4
(Netherlands) J Huta Galung	6	1	6
(Netherlands) A van der Duim	6	6
6	(France) A Michon	1	4
3	(Spain) D Gimeno Traver	6	6
(Croatia) T Androić	2	4
Q	(Germany) M Baumann	3	3
(France) T Lamasine	6	6

Quarterfinals
(Netherlands) J Huta Galung	6	6
(Netherlands) A van der Duim	3	2
3	(Spain) D Gimeno Traver	4	6^{5}
(France) T Lamasine	6	7^{7}

Semifinals
(Netherlands) J Huta Galung	6	6
(France) T Lamasine	4	2

=== Bottom half ===
First round
5	(Romania) V Hănescu	6	6
(Belgium) A De Greef	3	4
Q	(Netherlands) M Middelkoop	6	6
(Chile) H Podlipnik-Castillo	2	3
(Zimbabwe) T Garanganga	4	6^{4}
(Italy) L Giustino	6	7^{7}
Alt	(Belgium) K Coppejans	6	6^{4}	6
4/WC	(Netherlands) T de Bakker	3	7^{7}	4
7	(Italy) M Viola	1	5
Alt	(Spain) D Muñoz de la Nava	6	7
(Netherlands) B Westerhof	7	6
(Spain) I Cervantes Huegun	5	2
(Croatia) N Mektić	4	6	1
WC	(Netherlands) J Sels	6	3	6
Q	(Netherlands) W Koolhof	4	6	0
2/WC	(Netherlands) I Sijsling	6	0	6

Second round
5	(Romania) V Hănescu	6	7^{9}
Q	(Netherlands) M Middelkoop	3	6^{7}
(Italy) L Giustino	1	2
Alt	(Belgium) K Coppejans	6	6
Alt	(Spain) D Muñoz de la Nava	7^{8}	6
(Netherlands) B Westerhof	6^{6}	4
WC	(Netherlands) J Sels	0	5
2/WC	(Netherlands) I Sijsling	6	7

Quarterfinals
5	(Romania) V Hănescu	6	2	6
Alt	(Belgium) K Coppejans	1	6	3
Alt	(Spain) D Muñoz de la Nava	6	6
2/WC	(Netherlands) I Sijsling	3	2

Semifinals
5	(Romania) V Hănescu	4	3
Alt	(Spain) D Muñoz de la Nava	6	6
