= 2013 TEAN International – Men's singles =

Men's singles
- 2013 TEAN International

Final
- Champion: (Spain) Daniel Gimeno-Traver
- Runner-up: (Netherlands) Thomas Schoorel
- Score: 6–2, 6–4

Events
Singles	men	women
Doubles	men	women
← 2012 ·	TEAN International	· 2014 →

Thiemo de Bakker was the defending champion, but lost in the semifinals to Daniel Gimeno-Traver.

Daniel Gimeno-Traver won the title, defeating Thomas Schoorel in the final, 6–2, 6–4.

== Seeds ==
1. (Spain) Daniel Gimeno-Traver (champion)
2. (Israel) Dudi Sela (first round)
3. (Netherlands) Jesse Huta Galung (semifinals)
4. (Netherlands) Thiemo de Bakker (semifinals)
5. (Belgium) Olivier Rochus (first round)
6. (Belgium) Ruben Bemelmans (quarterfinals)
7. (Germany) Simon Greul (first round)
8. (Belgium) Steve Darcis (first round)

== Draw ==
=== Key ===
- Q = Qualifier
- WC = Wild card
- LL = Lucky loser
- Alt = Alternate
- SE = Special exempt
- PR = Protected ranking
- ITF = ITF entry
- JE = Junior exempt
- w/o = Walkover
- r = Retired
- d = Defaulted
- SR = Special ranking

=== Finals ===
Semifinals
1	(Spain) Daniel Gimeno-Traver	6	6^{7}	6
4/WC	(Netherlands) Thiemo de Bakker	3	7^{9}	3
3	(Netherlands) Jesse Huta Galung	3	2
(Netherlands) Thomas Schoorel	6	6

Final
1	(Spain) Daniel Gimeno-Traver	6	6
(Netherlands) Thomas Schoorel	2	4

=== Top half ===
First round
1	(Spain) D Gimeno-Traver	7^{7}	6
(France) D Guez	6^{4}	1
(France) G Burquier	0	2
(Netherlands) M Middelkoop	6	6
WC	(Netherlands) Miliaan Niesten	5	5
Q	(Netherlands) Alban Meuffels	7	7
Q	(Czech Republic) M Michalička	6	6
7	(Germany) S Greul	3	2
4/WC	(Netherlands) T de Bakker	7	6
(Czech Republic) R Jebavý	5	4
(Germany) D Meffert	4	4
(Germany) A Beck	6	6
(Bosnia and Herzegovina) D Džumhur	7^{9}	6
(Spain) G Granollers	6^{7}	3
(Belgium) Y Mertens	7^{7}	4	4
6	(Belgium) R Bemelmans	6^{2}	6	6

Second round
1	(Spain) D Gimeno-Traver	6	6
(Netherlands) M Middelkoop	2	4
Q	(Netherlands) A Meuffels	2	2
Q	(Czech Republic) M Michalička	6	6
4/WC	(Netherlands) T de Bakker	7	6
(Germany) A Beck	5	4
(Bosnia and Herzegovina) D Džumhur	4	7^{8}	6^{4}
6	(Belgium) R Bemelmans	6	6^{6}	7^{7}

Quarterfinals
1	(Spain) D Gimeno-Traver	7	6
Q	(Czech Republic) M Michalička	5	4
4/WC	(Netherlands) T de Bakker	6	7^{7}
6	(Belgium) R Bemelmans	4	6^{3}

Semifinals
1	(Spain) D Gimeno-Traver	6	6^{7}	6
4/WC	(Netherlands) T de Bakker	3	7^{9}	3

=== Bottom half ===
First round
8	(Belgium) S Darcis	4	6^{5}
Q	(Germany) R Becker	6	7^{7}
(Italy) S Vagnozzi	6	3	6
(Germany) C-M Stebe	2	6	3
(Italy) A Brizzi	1	6	4
WC	(Netherlands) W Koolhof	6	3	6
(Kazakhstan) E Korolev	3	3
3	(Netherlands) J Huta Galung	6	6
5	(Belgium) O Rochus	7^{7}	4	4
(Italy) R Bellotti	6^{2}	6	6
(Netherlands) T Schoorel	6	6
Q	(Germany) P Torebko	3	2
WC	(Netherlands) J Sels	7	3	2
(Spain) J Samper-Montaña	5	6	6
(Netherlands) B Westerhof	7	6
2	(Israel) D Sela	5	3

Second round
Q	(Germany) R Becker	6	6
(Italy) S Vagnozzi	3	3
WC	(Netherlands) W Koolhof	4	4
3	(Netherlands) J Huta Galung	6	6
(Italy) R Bellotti	2	2
(Netherlands) T Schoorel	6	6
(Spain) J Samper-Montaña	3	2
(Netherlands) B Westerhof	6	6

Quarterfinals
Q	(Germany) R Becker	1	5
3	(Netherlands) J Huta Galung	6	7
(Netherlands) T Schoorel	6	6
(Netherlands) B Westerhof	4	4

Semifinals
3	(Netherlands) J Huta Galung	3	2
(Netherlands) T Schoorel	6	6
