= 2009 TEAN International – Doubles =

Doubles
- 2009 TEAN International

Final
- Champions: (United Kingdom) Jonathan Marray (United Kingdom) Jamie Murray
- Runners-up: (Ukraine) Sergei Bubka (Ukraine) Sergiy Stakhovsky
- Score: 6–1, 6–4

Events
Singles	Doubles
- TEAN International

Rameez Junaid and Philipp Marx were the defending champions, but only Marx played this year.
Marx and Sebastian Rieschick were eliminated by Jesse Huta Galung and Igor Sijsling in the quarterfinals.
Jonathan Marray and Jamie Murray won in the final 6–1, 6–4, against Sergei Bubka and Sergiy Stakhovsky.

== Seeds ==
1. (Ukraine) Sergei Bubka / (Ukraine) Sergiy Stakhovsky (final)
2. (United Kingdom) Jonathan Marray / (United Kingdom) Jamie Murray (champions)
3. (Germany) Philipp Marx / (Germany) Sebastian Rieschick (quarterfinals)
4. (Poland) Tomasz Bednarek / (Poland) Mateusz Kowalczyk (first round)

== Draw ==
Key

- Q = Qualifier
- WC = Wild card
- LL = Lucky loser
- Alt = Alternate
- ITF = ITF entry
- PR = Protected ranking
- SR = Special ranking
- SE = Special exempt
- JE = Junior exempt
- JR = Junior Accelerator Programme entrant
- CO = College Accelerator Programme entrant
- NG = Next Gen Accelerator Program entrant
- w/o = Walkover
- r = Retired
- d = Defaulted

=== Draw ===
First round
1	(Ukraine) S Bubka (Ukraine) S Stakhovsky	7	7
WC	(Netherlands) M Koning (Netherlands) M Middelkoop	6^{3}	5
(Italy) A Arnaboldi (Italy) P Lorenzi	0	3
(Germany) M Bachinger (Austria) M Fischer	6	6
4	(Poland) T Bednarek (Poland) M Kowalczyk	2	7	[6]
WC	(Netherlands) A van der Duim (Netherlands) B Westerhof	6	5	[10]
(Chile) A García (Australia) J Sirianni	6	4	[8]
(France) J Dasnières de Veigy (France) É Roger-Vasselin	0	6	[10]
(Netherlands) J Huta Galung (Netherlands) I Sijsling	1	7	[10]
(Germany) M Emmrich (Sweden) A Siljeström	6	6^{3}	[5]
(Ukraine) I Marchenko (Ukraine) I Sergeyev	3	0
3	(Germany) P Marx (Germany) S Rieschick	6	6
WC	(Netherlands) J Eleveld (Netherlands) T van Terheijden	0	3
(Poland) A Chadaj (France) S Robert	6	6
ALT	(Netherlands) B Beks (United States) G Gehrke	1	3
2	(United Kingdom) J Marray (United Kingdom) J Murray	6	6

Quarterfinals
1	(Ukraine) S Bubka (Ukraine) S Stakhovsky	6	6
(Germany) M Bachinger (Austria) M Fischer	2	4
WC	(Netherlands) A van der Duim (Netherlands) B Westerhof	6	7
(France) J Dasnières de Veigy (France) É Roger-Vasselin	3	5
(Netherlands) J Huta Galung (Netherlands) I Sijsling	7	6
3	(Germany) P Marx (Germany) S Rieschick	6^{0}	4
(Poland) A Chadaj (France) S Robert	7	4	[8]
2	(United Kingdom) J Marray (United Kingdom) J Murray	6^{4}	6	[10]

Semifinals
1	(Ukraine) S Bubka (Ukraine) S Stakhovsky	6	6
WC	(Netherlands) A van der Duim (Netherlands) B Westerhof	4	4
(Netherlands) J Huta Galung (Netherlands) I Sijsling	6^{3}	4
2	(United Kingdom) J Marray (United Kingdom) J Murray	7	6

Finals
1	(Ukraine) S Bubka (Ukraine) S Stakhovsky	1	4
2	(United Kingdom) J Marray (United Kingdom) J Murray	6	6
