= 2013 TEAN International – Women's singles =

Women's singles
- 2013 TEAN International

Final
- Champion: (Netherlands) Arantxa Rus
- Runner-up: (Germany) Carina Witthöft
- Score: 4–6, 6–2, 6–2

Events
Singles	men	women
Doubles	men	women
← 2012 ·	TEAN International	· 2014 →

Sandra Záhlavová was the defending champion, having won the event in 2012, but chose not to compete in 2013.

Wildcard Arantxa Rus won the title, defeating first seed Carina Witthöft in the final, 4–6, 6–2, 6–2.

== Seeds ==
1. (Germany) Carina Witthöft (final)
2. (Argentina) María Irigoyen (first round)
3. (Netherlands) Richèl Hogenkamp (semifinals)
4. (France) Irena Pavlovic (quarterfinals)
5. (Russia) Valeria Solovyeva (first round)
6. (United States) Julia Cohen (quarterfinals)
7. (Switzerland) Viktorija Golubic (quarterfinals)
8. (Netherlands) Lesley Kerkhove (semifinals)

== Main draw ==
=== Key ===
- Q = Qualifier
- WC = Wild card
- LL = Lucky loser
- Alt = Alternate
- SE = Special exempt
- PR = Protected ranking
- ITF = ITF entry
- JE = Junior exempt
- w/o = Walkover
- r = Retired
- d = Defaulted
- SR = Special ranking

=== Finals ===
Semifinals
1	(Germany) Carina Witthöft	6	6
3	(Netherlands) Richèl Hogenkamp	3	4
8	(Netherlands) Lesley Kerkhove	4	2
WC	(Netherlands) Arantxa Rus	6	6

Final
1	(Germany) Carina Witthöft	6	2	2
WC	(Netherlands) Arantxa Rus	4	6	6

=== Top half ===
First round
1	(Germany) C Witthöft	6	6
(Argentina) C Pella	3	3
WC	(Netherlands) A van der Meet	0	3
(Switzerland) C Perrin	6	6
(Germany) A Zaja	2	1
Q	(Belarus) S Pirazhenka	6	6
LL	(Netherlands) G van de Graaf	2	1
6	(United States) J Cohen	6	6
3	(Netherlands) R Hogenkamp	4	6	6
Q	(France) I Brémond	6	0	1
Q	(Netherlands) E Wacanno	6^{4}	6^{5}
(Netherlands) C Burger	7^{7}	7^{7}
Q	(Netherlands) M Zuur	6	7
Q	(Netherlands) B van de Velde	3	5
(Poland) K Kawa	7^{7}	1	2
7	(Switzerland) V Golubic	6^{2}	6	6

Second round
1	(Germany) C Witthöft	6	6^{5}	6
(Switzerland) C Perrin	1	7^{7}	3
Q	(Belarus) S Pirazhenka	2	4
6	(United States) J Cohen	6	6
3	(Netherlands) R Hogenkamp	4	6	7
(Netherlands) C Burger	6	1	5
Q	(Netherlands) M Zuur	5	6	4
7	(Switzerland) V Golubic	7	4	6

Quarterfinals
1	(Germany) C Witthöft	6	6
6	(United States) J Cohen	3	0
3	(Netherlands) R Hogenkamp	6	6
7	(Switzerland) V Golubic	0	2

Semifinals
1	(Germany) C Witthöft	6	6
3	(Netherlands) R Hogenkamp	3	4

=== Bottom half ===
First round
8	(Netherlands) L Kerkhove	4	6	6
WC	(Netherlands) V Podda	6	2	0
WC	(Netherlands) M Wagemaker	3	4
(Chile) D Seguel	6	6
Q	(Germany) J Ozga	2	6	7
Q	(United States) B Pera	6	4	5
(Netherlands) L van Riet	1	6^{6}
4	(France) I Pavlovic	6	7^{8}
5	(Russia) V Solovyeva	3	6	2
(Netherlands) I de Vroome	6	4	6
Q	(Spain) L Cervera Vázquez	0	1
WC	(Netherlands) A Rus	6	6
(Bulgaria) A Naydenova	6	6
(Mexico) AS Sánchez	2	1
(Bulgaria) E Kostova	2	6	7
2	(Argentina) M Irigoyen	6	3	5

Second round
8	(Netherlands) L Kerkhove	6	7^{7}
(Chile) D Seguel	1	6^{2}
Q	(Germany) J Ozga	3	4
4	(France) I Pavlovic	6	6
(Netherlands) I de Vroome	1	2
WC	(Netherlands) A Rus	6	6
(Bulgaria) A Naydenova	5	2
(Bulgaria) E Kostova	7	6

Quarterfinals
8	(Netherlands) L Kerkhove	3	6	6
4	(France) I Pavlovic	6	4	3
WC	(Netherlands) A Rus	6	6
(Bulgaria) E Kostova	2	1

Semifinals
8	(Netherlands) L Kerkhove	4	2
WC	(Netherlands) A Rus	6	6
