= 2012 TEAN International – Women's doubles =

Women's doubles
- 2012 TEAN International

Final
- Champions: (Romania) Diana Buzean (Netherlands) Daniëlle Harmsen
- Runners-up: (Italy) Corinna Dentoni (Germany) Justine Ozga
- Score: 6–2, 6–0

Events
Singles	men	women
Doubles	men	women
← 2011 ·	TEAN International	· 2013 →

Diana Enache and Daniëlle Harmsen are the defending champions.
Diana married this year and her name changed to Buzean.

Buzean and Harmsen successfully defended their title, defeating Corinna Dentoni and Justine Ozga 6–2, 6–0 in the final.

== Seeds ==
1. (Canada) Sharon Fichman / (Russia) Arina Rodionova (quarterfinals)
2. (United Kingdom) Naomi Broady / (Romania) Mihaela Buzărnescu (first round)
3. (Bulgaria) Aleksandrina Naydenova / (Brazil) Teliana Pereira (first round)
4. (Liechtenstein) Stephanie Vogt / (Germany) Kathrin Wörle (quarterfinals)

== Draw ==
=== Key ===
- Q = Qualifier
- WC = Wild card
- LL = Lucky loser
- Alt = Alternate
- SE = Special exempt
- PR = Protected ranking
- ITF = ITF entry
- JE = Junior exempt
- w/o = Walkover
- r = Retired
- d = Defaulted
- SR = Special ranking

=== Draw ===
First round
1	(Canada) S Fichman (Russia) A Rodionova	6	6
(Turkey) P Özgen (Croatia) A Vrljić	4	2
(Netherlands) A Tigu (Netherlands) K Versteeg
(Italy) C Dentoni (Germany) J Ozga	w/o
4	(Liechtenstein) S Vogt (Germany) K Wörle	6	6
(Netherlands) D Schuurs (Netherlands) B van de Velde	2	1
(Latvia) D Marcinkēviča (Russia) E Pashkova	6	6
(Netherlands) L Kerkhove (Slovakia) R Tabak	0	0
(Poland) K Piter (Poland) B Sobaszkiewicz	6	6
WC	(Netherlands) H Korompis (Netherlands) A van Rossum	1	0
(Belarus) S Pirazhenka (Germany) A Zaja	4	7	[10]
3	(Bulgaria) A Naydenova (Brazil) T Pereira	6	5	[5]
(Netherlands) V Podda (Netherlands) R van der Hoek	6	6
WC	(Netherlands) F van Diemen (Netherlands) K van Rijn	2	2
(Romania) D Buzean (Netherlands) D Harmsen	6	6
2	(United Kingdom) N Broady (Romania) M Buzărnescu	3	4

Quarterfinals
1	(Canada) S Fichman (Russia) A Rodionova	6	6^{4}	[4]
(Italy) C Dentoni (Germany) J Ozga	2	7^{7}	[10]
4	(Liechtenstein) S Vogt (Germany) K Wörle	6^{5}	2
(Latvia) D Marcinkēviča (Russia) E Pashkova	7^{7}	6
(Poland) K Piter (Poland) B Sobaszkiewicz	2	7	[5]
(Belarus) S Pirazhenka (Germany) A Zaja	6	5	[10]
(Netherlands) V Podda (Netherlands) R van der Hoek	4	0
(Romania) D Buzean (Netherlands) D Harmsen	6	6

Semifinals
(Italy) C Dentoni (Germany) J Ozga	7	7
(Latvia) D Marcinkēviča (Russia) E Pashkova	5	5
(Belarus) S Pirazhenka (Germany) A Zaja	4	0
(Romania) D Buzean (Netherlands) D Harmsen	6	6

Final
(Italy) C Dentoni (Germany) J Ozga	2	0
(Romania) D Buzean (Netherlands) D Harmsen	6	6
