= 2012 TEAN International – Women's singles =

Women's singles
- 2012 TEAN International

Final
- Champion: (Czech Republic) Sandra Záhlavová
- Runner-up: (Netherlands) Lesley Kerkhove
- Score: 7–5, 7–6^{(7–5)}

Events
Singles	men	women
Doubles	men	women
← 2011 ·	TEAN International	· 2013 →

Stephanie Vogt was the defending champion, but lost in the first round to Justine Ozga.

Sandra Záhlavová won the title, defeating Lesley Kerkhove 7–5, 7–6^{(7–5)} in the final.

== Seeds ==
1. (Belarus) Anastasiya Yakimova (first round, retired)
2. (Romania) Mihaela Buzărnescu (first round)
3. (Canada) Sharon Fichman (first round)
4. (Brazil) Teliana Pereira (first round)
5. (Germany) Kathrin Wörle (second round)
6. (Peru) Bianca Botto (first round, withdrew)
7. (France) Iryna Brémond (first round)
8. (United Kingdom) Naomi Broady (first round)

== Draw ==
=== Key ===
- Q = Qualifier
- WC = Wild card
- LL = Lucky loser
- Alt = Alternate
- SE = Special exempt
- PR = Protected ranking
- ITF = ITF entry
- JE = Junior exempt
- w/o = Walkover
- r = Retired
- d = Defaulted
- SR = Special ranking

=== Finals ===
Semifinals
Q	(Germany) Justine Ozga	6^{2}	3
(Czech Republic) Sandra Záhlavová	7^{7}	6
(Latvia) Diāna Marcinkēviča	3	5
WC	(Netherlands) Lesley Kerkhove	6	7

Final
(Czech Republic) Sandra Záhlavová	7	7^{7}
WC	(Netherlands) Lesley Kerkhove	5	6^{5}

=== Top half ===
First round
1	(Belarus) A Yakimova	0	r
(France) M Georges	6
(Turkey) P Özgen	0	6	4
(Spain) L Costas	6	4	6
(Liechtenstein) S Vogt	4	6	4
Q	(Germany) J Ozga	6	1	6
(Ukraine) M Zanevska	7	6
8	(United Kingdom) N Broady	5	2
4	(Brazil) T Pereira	4	4
(Bosnia and Herzegovina) M Jugić-Salkić	6	6
(Croatia) A Vrljić	5	2
Q	(Germany) A Zaja	7	6
Q	(Venezuela) A Gámiz	7^{8}	3	1
(Czech Republic) S Záhlavová	6^{6}	6	6
Q	(Austria) J Toljan	6
6	(Peru) B Botto	0	r

Second round
(France) M Georges	6	6
(Spain) L Costas	1	1
Q	(Germany) J Ozga	6	7
(Ukraine) M Zanevska	1	5
(Bosnia and Herzegovina) M Jugić-Salkić	6	3	7
Q	(Germany) A Zaja	1	6	5
(Czech Republic) S Záhlavová	7	6
(Austria) J Toljan	5	1

Quarterfinals
(France) M Georges	5	6	5
Q	(Germany) J Ozga	7	2	7
(Bosnia and Herzegovina) M Jugić-Salkić
(Czech Republic) S Záhlavová	w/o

Semifinals
Q	(Germany) J Ozga	6^{2}	3
(Czech Republic) S Záhlavová	7^{7}	6

=== Bottom half ===
First round
7	(France) I Brémond	3	2
(Spain) A Parra Santonja	6	6
Q	(Russia) A Rodionova	2	2
WC	(Netherlands) A van der Meet	6	6
Q	(Poland) K Piter	7^{7}	7^{7}
Q	(Spain) E Fernández-Brugués	6^{5}	6^{4}
(Latvia) D Marcinkēviča	6	6
3	(Canada) S Fichman	4	0
5	(Germany) K Wörle	6	6
(Italy) C Dentoni	1	1
WC	(Netherlands) C Ewijk	7^{7}	3	6
(Georgia (country)) M Chakhnashvili	6^{5}	6	4
WC	(Netherlands) L Kerkhove	6	3
WC	(Netherlands) Q Lemoine	4	1^{r}
Q	(Georgia (country)) S Kvatsabaia	6	6
2	(Romania) M Buzărnescu	3	2

Second round
(Spain) A Parra Santonja	4	2
WC	(Netherlands) A van der Meet	6	6
Q	(Poland) K Piter	7^{7}	5	3
(Latvia) D Marcinkēviča	6^{4}	7	6
5	(Germany) K Wörle	7	5	4
WC	(Netherlands) C Ewijk	5	7	6
WC	(Netherlands) L Kerkhove	6	6
Q	(Georgia (country)) S Kvatsabaia	3	3

Quarterfinals
WC	(Netherlands) A van der Meet	6^{3}	6	3
(Latvia) D Marcinkēviča	7^{7}	2	6
WC	(Netherlands) C Ewijk	6	4	6^{3}
WC	(Netherlands) L Kerkhove	0	6	7^{7}

Semifinals
(Latvia) D Marcinkēviča	3	5
WC	(Netherlands) L Kerkhove	6	7
