= 2012 TEAN International – Men's doubles =

Men's doubles
- 2012 TEAN International

Final
- Champions: (Australia) Rameez Junaid (Germany) Simon Stadler
- Runners-up: (Germany) Simon Greul (Germany) Bastian Knittel
- Score: 4–6, 6–1, [10–5]

Events
Singles	men	women
Doubles	men	women
- TEAN International

Thiemo de Bakker and Antal van der Duim were the defending champions but decided not to participate together.
de Bakker played alongside Thomas Schoorel, while van der Duim partnered up with Boy Westerhof.
Rameez Junaid and Simon Stadler won the final 4–6, 6–1, [10–5] against Simon Greul and Bastian Knittel.

== Seeds ==
1. (Australia) Rameez Junaid / (Germany) Simon Stadler (champions)
2. (Australia) Jordan Kerr / (Czech Republic) David Škoch (first round)
3. (Spain) Daniel Gimeno-Traver / (Spain) Iván Navarro (quarterfinals)
4. (Belgium) Ruben Bemelmans / (Netherlands) Matwé Middelkoop (quarterfinals, withdrew)

== Draw ==
Key

- Q = Qualifier
- WC = Wild card
- LL = Lucky loser
- Alt = Alternate
- ITF = ITF entry
- PR = Protected ranking
- SR = Special ranking
- SE = Special exempt
- JE = Junior exempt
- JR = Junior Accelerator Programme entrant
- CO = College Accelerator Programme entrant
- NG = Next Gen Accelerator Program entrant
- w/o = Walkover
- r = Retired
- d = Defaulted

=== Draw ===
First round
1	(Australia) R Junaid (Germany) S Stadler	6	6
(Germany) A Satschko (Germany) J-L Struff	4	4
(Netherlands) M Koning (Curaçao) M van Haasteren	6	6
(Netherlands) A van der Duim (Netherlands) B Westerhof	3	1
4	(Belgium) R Bemelmans (Netherlands) M Middelkoop	6	6
(Switzerland) H Laaksonen (Germany) P Torebko	4	1
(Netherlands) T de Bakker (Netherlands) T Schoorel	6	6
(Poland) A Kapaś (Ukraine) I Sergeyev	3	4
WC	(Netherlands) Romano Frantzen (Netherlands) W Koolhof	3	3
(Germany) S Greul (Germany) B Knittel	6	6
(France) J Dasnières de Veigy (Belgium) Y Mertens	1	1
3	(Spain) D Gimeno-Traver (Spain) I Navarro	6	6
(Spain) Í Cervantes (Netherlands) S Fransen	6	6
WC	(Netherlands) J Sels (Netherlands) Vincent van den Honert	1	3
(Czech Republic) J Mertl (Czech Republic) M Michalička	7^{7}	6
2	(Australia) J Kerr (Czech Republic) D Škoch	6^{3}	1

Quarterfinals
1	(Australia) R Junaid (Germany) S Stadler	6	6
(Netherlands) M Koning (Curaçao) M van Haasteren	0	1
4	(Belgium) R Bemelmans (Netherlands) M Middelkoop
(Netherlands) T de Bakker (Netherlands) T Schoorel	w/o
(Germany) S Greul (Germany) B Knittel	6	6
3	(Spain) D Gimeno-Traver (Spain) I Navarro	2	1
(Spain) Í Cervantes (Netherlands) S Fransen	4	4
(Czech Republic) J Mertl (Czech Republic) M Michalička	6	6

Semifinals
1	(Australia) R Junaid (Germany) S Stadler	6	7^{8}
(Netherlands) T de Bakker (Netherlands) T Schoorel	3	6^{6}
(Germany) S Greul (Germany) B Knittel	6	6
(Czech Republic) J Mertl (Czech Republic) M Michalička	3	0

Final
1	(Australia) R Junaid (Germany) S Stadler	4	6	[10]
(Germany) S Greul (Germany) B Knittel	6	1	[5]
