= 2017 TEAN International – Singles =

Singles
- 2017 TEAN International

Final
- Champion: (Estonia) Jürgen Zopp
- Runner-up: (Spain) Tommy Robredo
- Score: 6–3, 6–2

Events
Singles	Doubles
- TEAN International

Jan-Lennard Struff was the defending champion but chose not to defend his title.

Jürgen Zopp won the title after defeating Tommy Robredo 6–3, 6–2 in the final.

== Seeds ==
1. (Argentina) Carlos Berlocq (second round)
2. (Portugal) Pedro Sousa (second round)
3. (Germany) Oscar Otte (semifinals)
4. (Belgium) Arthur De Greef (first round, retired)
5. (Spain) Tommy Robredo (final)
6. (Germany) Yannick Maden (quarterfinals)
7. (France) Gleb Sakharov (second round)
8. (Czech Republic) Jan Šátral (first round)

== Draw ==
Key

- Q = Qualifier
- WC = Wild card
- LL = Lucky loser
- Alt = Alternate
- ITF = ITF entry
- PR = Protected ranking
- SR = Special ranking
- SE = Special exempt
- JE = Junior exempt
- JR = Junior Accelerator Programme entrant
- CO = College Accelerator Programme entrant
- NG = Next Gen Accelerator Program entrant
- w/o = Walkover
- r = Retired
- d = Defaulted

=== Finals ===
Semifinals
Q	(Estonia) Jürgen Zopp	3	7	6
3	(Germany) Oscar Otte	6	5	3
5/WC	(Spain) Tommy Robredo	3	7	6
(Netherlands) Tallon Griekspoor	6	5	1

Final
Q	(Estonia) Jürgen Zopp	6	6
5/WC	(Spain) Tommy Robredo	3	2

=== Top half ===
First round
1	(Argentina) C Berlocq	6	6
PR	(Italy) F Cipolla	3	4
(Spain) R Ramírez Hidalgo	3	2
(Poland) K Majchrzak	6	6
(Portugal) João Monteiro	3	0
(Germany) M Moraing	6	6
Q	(Estonia) J Zopp	7^{7}	6^{7}	6
8	(Czech Republic) J Šátral	6^{2}	7^{9}	3
3	(Germany) O Otte	6	6
WC	(Netherlands) J Sels	1	1
PR	(Spain) D Muñoz de la Nava	4	2
(France) C Lestienne	6	6
WC	(Netherlands) T de Bakker	6	6
(Germany) D Masur	4	4
(Egypt) K-M Maamoun	0	2
6	(Germany) Y Maden	6	6

Second round
1	(Argentina) C Berlocq	6	3	3
(Poland) K Majchrzak	3	6	6
(Germany) M Moraing	6	3	5
Q	(Estonia) J Zopp	4	6	7
3	(Germany) O Otte	6	6
(France) C Lestienne	4	3
WC	(Netherlands) T de Bakker	5	7^{7}	1
6	(Germany) Y Maden	7	6^{1}	6

Quarterfinals
(Poland) K Majchrzak	3	4
Q	(Estonia) J Zopp	6	6
3	(Germany) O Otte	4	6	7^{7}
6	(Germany) Y Maden	6	1	6^{4}

Semifinals
Q	(Estonia) J Zopp	3	7	6
3	(Germany) O Otte	6	5	3

=== Bottom half ===
First round
5/WC	(Spain) T Robredo	6^{1}	6	7^{7}
(Netherlands) B van de Zandschulp	7^{7}	3	6^{2}
(Germany) Jeremy Jahn	6	6
Q	(Ecuador) I Endara	1	4
WC	(Netherlands) B Westerhof	3	6	6
(Italy) M Viola	6	4	3
Q	(Belgium) J Cagnina	4
4	(Belgium) A De Greef	0^{r}
7	(France) G Sakharov	6	6
(Italy) A Arnaboldi	3	4
Q	(Germany) K Krawietz	6	5	7^{7}
(Sweden) M Ymer	2	7	6^{4}
(Netherlands) T Griekspoor	6^{7}	6	7
(Austria) L Miedler	7^{9}	0	5
(Serbia) P Krstin	4	6	2
2	(Portugal) P Sousa	6	4	6

Second round
5/WC	(Spain) T Robredo	6	7^{7}
(Germany) J Jahn	4	6^{4}
WC	(Netherlands) B Westerhof	4	3
Q	(Belgium) J Cagnina	6	6
7	(France) G Sakharov	5	7^{7}	4
Q	(Germany) K Krawietz	7	6^{0}	6
(Netherlands) T Griekspoor	1	6	7^{8}
2	(Portugal) P Sousa	6	0	6^{6}

Quarterfinals
5/WC	(Spain) T Robredo	7	6
Q	(Belgium) J Cagnina	5	3
Q	(Germany) K Krawietz	6^{3}	1
(Netherlands) T Griekspoor	7^{7}	6

Semifinals
5/WC	(Spain) T Robredo	3	7	6
(Netherlands) T Griekspoor	6	5	1
