= 2014 TEAN International – Men's doubles =

Men's doubles
- 2014 TEAN International

Final
- Champions: (Netherlands) Antal van der Duim (Netherlands) Boy Westerhof
- Runners-up: (Spain) Rubén Ramírez Hidalgo (Italy) Matteo Viola
- Score: 6–1, 6–3

Events
Singles	men	women
Doubles	men	women
← 2013 ·	TEAN International	· 2015 →

Antal van der Duim and Boy Westerhof retained their title, beating Rubén Ramírez Hidalgo and Matteo Viola 6–1, 6–3

== Seeds ==
1. (Netherlands) Jesse Huta Galung / (Australia) Rameez Junaid (first round)
2. (Netherlands) Stephan Fransen / (Netherlands) Robin Haase (quarterfinals)
3. (Philippines) Ruben Gonzales / (United Kingdom) Sean Thornley (quarterfinals)
4. (Netherlands) Antal van der Duim / (Netherlands) Boy Westerhof (champions)

== Draw ==
=== Key ===
- Q = Qualifier
- WC = Wild card
- LL = Lucky loser
- Alt = Alternate
- SE = Special exempt
- PR = Protected ranking
- ITF = ITF entry
- JE = Junior exempt
- w/o = Walkover
- r = Retired
- d = Defaulted
- SR = Special ranking

=== Draw ===
First round
1	(Netherlands) J Huta Galung (Australia) R Junaid	6^{7}	4
(Netherlands) T de Bakker (Netherlands) W Koolhof	7^{9}	6
(Spain) R Carballés Baena (Spain) G Granollers	6	6
(Belgium) A De Greef (Belgium) Y Mertens	4	0
3	(Philippines) R Gonzales (United Kingdom) S Thornley	7^{7}	7
WC	(Chile) H Podlipnik-Castillo (Netherlands) Lennert Van Der Linden	6^{4}	5
WC	(Netherlands) S Arends (Netherlands) N Lootsma	6^{0}	4
(Spain) R Ramírez Hidalgo (Italy) M Viola	7^{7}	6
(Spain) D Gimeno Traver (Spain) D Muñoz de la Nava	6	6
WC	(Netherlands) J Sels (Netherlands) Vincent Van den Honert	4	4
(Netherlands) M Middelkoop (Germany) P Torebko	3	4
4	(Netherlands) A van der Duim (Netherlands) B Westerhof	6	6
(Croatia) T Androić (Croatia) N Mektić	6	3	[10]
(France) A Michon (France) M Teixeira	4	6	[6]
(Romania) V Hănescu (Germany) P Marx	4	6^{4}
2	(Netherlands) S Fransen (Netherlands) R Haase	6	7^{7}

Quarterfinals
(Netherlands) T de Bakker (Netherlands) W Koolhof	2	3
(Spain) R Carballés Baena (Spain) G Granollers	6	6
3	(Philippines) R Gonzales (United Kingdom) S Thornley	4	6^{4}
(Spain) R Ramírez Hidalgo (Italy) M Viola	6	7^{7}
(Spain) D Gimeno Traver (Spain) D Muñoz de la Nava	2	4
4	(Netherlands) A van der Duim (Netherlands) B Westerhof	6	6
(Croatia) T Androić (Croatia) N Mektić	6	6
2	(Netherlands) S Fransen (Netherlands) R Haase	3	1

Semifinals
(Spain) R Carballés Baena (Spain) G Granollers	3	2
(Spain) R Ramírez Hidalgo (Italy) M Viola	6	6
4	(Netherlands) A van der Duim (Netherlands) B Westerhof	2	6	[10]
(Croatia) T Androić (Croatia) N Mektić	6	3	[5]

Final
(Spain) R Ramírez Hidalgo (Italy) M Viola	1	3
4	(Netherlands) A van der Duim (Netherlands) B Westerhof	6	6
