= 2009 TEAN International – Singles =

Singles
- 2009 TEAN International

Final
- Champion: (France) Stéphane Robert
- Runner-up: (United States) Michael Russell
- Score: 7–6(2), 5–7, 7–6(5)

Events
Singles	Doubles
- TEAN International

Simon Greul chose to not defend his 2008 title.
Stéphane Robert defeated Michael Russell 7–6(2), 5–7, 7–6(5) in the final.

== Seeds ==
1. (Croatia) Roko Karanušić (first round)
2. (United States) Michael Russell (final)
3. (Ukraine) Sergiy Stakhovsky (first round)
4. (Italy) Paolo Lorenzi (second round)
5. (Netherlands) Thiemo de Bakker (semifinals)
6. (France) Édouard Roger-Vasselin (first round)
7. (France) Stéphane Robert (champion)
8. (Germany) Julian Reister (quarterfinals)

== Draw ==
Key

- Q = Qualifier
- WC = Wild card
- LL = Lucky loser
- Alt = Alternate
- ITF = ITF entry
- PR = Protected ranking
- SR = Special ranking
- SE = Special exempt
- JE = Junior exempt
- JR = Junior Accelerator Programme entrant
- CO = College Accelerator Programme entrant
- NG = Next Gen Accelerator Program entrant
- w/o = Walkover
- r = Retired
- d = Defaulted

=== Final four ===
Semifinals
(Netherlands) Raemon Sluiter	6	3	2
7	(France) Stéphane Robert	2	6	6
5	(Netherlands) Thiemo de Bakker	4	3
2	(United States) Michael Russell	6	6

Final
7	(France) Stéphane Robert	7	5	7
2	(United States) Michael Russell	6^{2}	7	6^{5}

=== Top half ===
First round
1	(Croatia) R Karanušić	4	6	2
(Netherlands) R Sluiter	6	2	6
WC	(Netherlands) B Westerhof	3	4
(Austria) M Fischer	6	6
(France) J Dasnières de Veigy	7	6
(Ukraine) I Marchenko	6^{4}	0
(Netherlands) J Huta Galung	1	4
8	(Germany) J Reister	6	6
4	(Italy) P Lorenzi	6	7
Q	(Australia) R Junaid	2	6^{10}
(Ukraine) S Bubka	6^{0}	0
(Italy) A Arnaboldi	7	6
(Czech Republic) J Minář	5	6	2
WC	(Netherlands) I Sijsling	7	3	6
(Belgium) Y Mertens	1	7	2
7	(France) S Robert	6	6^{2}	6

Second round
(Netherlands) R Sluiter	6	3	7
(Austria) M Fischer	2	6	5
(France) J Dasnières de Veigy	1	1
8	(Germany) J Reister	6	6
4	(Italy) P Lorenzi	1	6	2
(Italy) A Arnaboldi	6	4	6
WC	(Netherlands) I Sijsling	2	3
7	(France) S Robert	6	6

Quarterfinals
(Netherlands) R Sluiter	6	6
8	(Germany) J Reister	3	4
(Italy) A Arnaboldi	4	6	2
7	(France) S Robert	6	4	6

Semifinals
(Netherlands) R Sluiter	6	3	2
7	(France) S Robert	2	6	6

=== Bottom half ===
First round
5	(Netherlands) T de Bakker	6	6
(Australia) J Sirianni	1	2
(Chile) A García	7	6
LL	(Germany) S Rieschick	6^{2}	2
(Germany) D Kindlmann	6	6
Q	(Netherlands) J Eleveld	4	4
(Germany) M Bachinger	6	6
3	(Ukraine) S Stakhovsky	4	2
6	(France) É Roger-Vasselin	6	1	4
Q	(Finland) T Nieminen	1	6	6
WC	(Netherlands) M Middelkoop	3	6	6
(Switzerland) M Lammer	6	3	2
Q	(Netherlands) T Schoorel	2	6	6^{4}
(Ukraine) I Sergeyev	6	1	7
WC	(Netherlands) M Koning	3	4
2	(United States) M Russell	6	6

Second round
5	(Netherlands) T de Bakker	6	5	6
(Chile) A García	1	7	2
(Germany) D Kindlmann	3	0	r
(Germany) M Bachinger	6	2
Q	(Finland) T Nieminen	5	6^{6}
WC	(Netherlands) M Middelkoop	7	7
(Ukraine) I Sergeyev	1	4
2	(United States) M Russell	6	6

Quarterfinals
5	(Netherlands) T de Bakker	4	6	6
(Germany) M Bachinger	6	3	4
WC	(Netherlands) M Middelkoop	3	6	3
2	(United States) M Russell	6	2	6

Semifinals
5	(Netherlands) T de Bakker	4	3
2	(United States) M Russell	6	6
