= 2011 TEAN International – Men's doubles =

Men's doubles
- 2011 TEAN International

Final
- Champions: (Netherlands) Thiemo de Bakker (Netherlands) Antal van der Duim
- Runners-up: (Netherlands) Matwé Middelkoop (Netherlands) Igor Sijsling
- Score: 6–4, 6–7^{(4–7)}, [10–6]

Events
Singles	men	women
Doubles	men	women
← 2010 ·	TEAN International	· 2012 →

Farrukh Dustov and Bertram Steinberger were the defending champions, but decided not to participate.
Thiemo de Bakker and Antal van der Duim won the title, defeating Matwé Middelkoop and Igor Sijsling 6–4, 6–7^{(4–7)}, [10–6] in the final.

== Seeds ==
1. (Germany) Simon Greul / (Germany) Bastian Knittel (first round)
2. (Italy) Andrea Arnaboldi / (Slovenia) Grega Žemlja (first round)
3. (Netherlands) Matwé Middelkoop / (Netherlands) Igor Sijsling (final)
4. (Netherlands) Thiemo de Bakker / (Netherlands) Antal van der Duim (champions)

== Draw ==
=== Key ===
- Q = Qualifier
- WC = Wild card
- LL = Lucky loser
- Alt = Alternate
- SE = Special exempt
- PR = Protected ranking
- ITF = ITF entry
- JE = Junior exempt
- w/o = Walkover
- r = Retired
- d = Defaulted
- SR = Special ranking

=== Draw ===
First round
1	(Germany) S Greul (Germany) B Knittel	3	6	[6]
(Czech Republic) M Michalička (Czech Republic) R Vögeli	6	4	[10]
WC	(Russia) Alexey Korolev (Kazakhstan) E Korolev	6	6
(Slovakia) P Červenák (Czech Republic) J Mertl	4	3
4	(Netherlands) T de Bakker (Netherlands) A van der Duim	6	6
(Netherlands) Bobbie de Goeijen (Netherlands) Matthew Pierot	2	4
(Greece) N Karagiannis (Republic of Ireland) J McGee	5	3
(Netherlands) S Fransen (Germany) J-L Struff	7	6
(France) J Dasnières de Veigy (France) D Guez
(Netherlands) Romano Frantzen (Netherlands) N van der Meer	w/o
WC	(Netherlands) J Sels (Netherlands) Vincent van de Honert	2	2
3	(Netherlands) M Middelkoop (Netherlands) I Sijsling	6	6
WC	(Netherlands) M Koning (Curaçao) M van Haasteren	6	6
(Netherlands) Yannick Ebbinghaus (Netherlands) Lennert van der Linden	4	2
(France) J Eysseric (France) A Gensse	6	6
2	(Italy) A Arnaboldi (Slovenia) G Žemlja	3	3

Quarterfinals
(Czech Republic) M Michalička (Czech Republic) R Vögeli	6	6
WC	(Russia) Alexey Korolev (Kazakhstan) E Korolev	1	1
4	(Netherlands) T de Bakker (Netherlands) A van der Duim	6	7^{7}
(Netherlands) S Fransen (Germany) J-L Struff	3	6^{5}
(Netherlands) R Frantzen (Netherlands) N van der Meer	4	4
3	(Netherlands) M Middelkoop (Netherlands) I Sijsling	6	6
(Netherlands) M Koning (Curaçao) M van Haasteren	6^{3}	6^{4}
(France) J Eysseric (France) A Gensse	7^{7}	7^{7}

Semifinals
(Czech Republic) M Michalička (Czech Republic) R Vögeli	3	2
4	(Netherlands) T de Bakker (Netherlands) A van der Duim	6	6
3	(Netherlands) M Middelkoop (Netherlands) I Sijsling	6	6
(France) J Eysseric (France) A Gensse	1	1

Final
4	(Netherlands) T de Bakker (Netherlands) A van der Duim	6	6^{4}	[10]
3	(Netherlands) M Middelkoop (Netherlands) I Sijsling	4	7^{7}	[6]
