= 2014 Copa Sevilla – Singles =

Singles
- 2014 Copa Sevilla

Final
- Champion: (Spain) Pablo Carreño
- Runner-up: (Japan) Taro Daniel
- Score: 6–4, 6–1

Events
| Singles | Doubles |
| ← 2013 · | Copa Sevilla | · 2015 → |

Daniel Gimeno-Traver was the defending champion, but lost to Daniel Muñoz de la Nava in the first round.

Pablo Carreño won the title, defeating Taro Daniel 6–4, 6–1 in the final.

== Seeds ==
1. (Spain) Pablo Carreño (champion)
2. (Spain) Daniel Gimeno Traver (first round)
3. (France) Pierre-Hugues Herbert (first round)
4. (Austria) Gerald Melzer (first round)
5. (Spain) Adrián Menéndez-Maceiras (quarterfinals)
6. (Japan) Taro Daniel (final)
7. (Spain) Roberto Carballés Baena (first round)
8. (Italy) Flavio Cipolla (second round)

== Draw ==
=== Key ===
- Q = Qualifier
- WC = Wild card
- LL = Lucky loser
- Alt = Alternate
- SE = Special exempt
- PR = Protected ranking
- ITF = ITF entry
- JE = Junior exempt
- w/o = Walkover
- r = Retired
- d = Defaulted
- SR = Special ranking

=== Finals ===
Semifinals
1 | (Spain) Pablo Carreño | 6 | 6
(Spain) Iñigo Cervantes Huegun | 4 | 4
(Netherlands) Boy Westerhof | 1^{r}
6 | (Japan) Taro Daniel | 4

Final
1 | (Spain) Pablo Carreño | 6 | 6
6 | (Japan) Taro Daniel | 4 | 1

=== Top half ===
First round
1 | (Spain) P Carreño | 6 | 3 | 7^{8}
(Spain) J Samper Montaña | 3 | 6 | 6^{6}
(Spain) J Lizariturry | 6 | 7
(Spain) D Pérez Sanz | 3 | 5
(Netherlands) J Huta Galung | 6 | 6
(France) M Vaïsse | 4 | 1
(Netherlands) A van der Duim | 4 | 0
5 | (Spain) A Menéndez-Maceiras | 6 | 6
3 | (France) P-H Herbert | 7 | 4 | 4
(Spain) R Ortega-Olmedo | 5 | 6 | 6
(Spain) I Cervantes | 4 | 6 | 6
(Spain) G Granollers | 6 | 2 | 4
WC | (Spain) Agustin Boje-Ordonez | 6^{4} | 6 | 1
WC | (Spain) D Vega Hernández | 7^{7} | 1 | 6
(Italy) L Giustino | 6 | 6
7 | (Spain) R Carballés Baena | 4 | 4

Second round
1 | (Spain) P Carreño | 6 | 6
(Spain) J Lizariturry | 1 | 2
(Netherlands) J Huta Galung | 1 | 4
5 | (Spain) A Menéndez-Maceiras | 6 | 6
(Spain) R Ortega-Olmedo | 1 | 6^{2}
(Spain) I Cervantes | 6 | 7^{7}
WC | (Spain) D Vega Hernández | 7^{7} | 6^{7} | 7^{7}
(Italy) L Giustino | 6^{4} | 7^{9} | 6^{4}

Quarterfinals
1 | (Spain) P Carreño | 1 | 6 | 6
5 | (Spain) A Menéndez-Maceiras | 6 | 2 | 4
(Spain) I Cervantes | 6 | 7
WC | (Spain) D Vega Hernández | 3 | 5

Semifinals
1 | (Spain) P Carreño | 6 | 6
(Spain) I Cervantes | 4 | 4

=== Bottom half ===
First round
8 | (Italy) F Cipolla | 6 | 6
Q | (Czech Republic) Michal Schmid | 2 | 1
(Netherlands) B Westerhof | 7^{8} | 6
(Belgium) Y Mertens | 6^{6} | 3
(Spain) O Roca Batalla | 7^{7} | 7^{7}
Q | (Spain) Albert Alcaraz Ivorra | 6^{3} | 6^{4}
(France) J Eysseric | 7^{12} | 6
4 | (Austria) G Melzer | 6^{10} | 1
6 | (Japan) T Daniel | 6 | 6
(Canada) S Diez | 1 | 2
WC | (Spain) R Ojeda Lara | 6 | 6
WC | (Spain) Pedro Dominguez Alonso | 1 | 1
Q | (Portugal) F Gil | 7 | 6
Q | (Spain) Eduard Esteve Lobato | 5 | 3
(Spain) D Muñoz de la Nava | 6 | 6
2 | (Spain) D Gimeno Traver | 0 | 3

Second round
8 | (Italy) F Cipolla | 3 | 7 | 6^{4}
(Netherlands) B Westerhof | 6 | 5 | 7^{7}
(Spain) O Roca Batalla | 6 | 6
(France) J Eysseric | 3 | 4
6 | (Japan) T Daniel | 6 | 6
WC | (Spain) R Ojeda Lara | 2 | 2
Q | (Portugal) F Gil | 4 | 2
(Spain) D Muñoz de la Nava | 6 | 6

Quarterfinals
(Netherlands) B Westerhof | 6^{6} | 6 | 6
(Spain) O Roca Batalla | 7^{8} | 2 | 3
6 | (Japan) T Daniel | 2 | 7 | 7
(Spain) D Muñoz de la Nava | 6 | 5 | 5

Semifinals
(Netherlands) B Westerhof | 1^{r}
6 | (Japan) T Daniel | 4
