= 2011 TEAN International – Women's singles =

Women's singles
- 2011 TEAN International

Final
- Champion: (Liechtenstein) Stephanie Vogt
- Runner-up: (Poland) Katarzyna Piter
- Score: 6–2, 6–4

Events
Singles	men	women
Doubles	men	women
← 2010 ·	TEAN International	· 2012 →

Julia Schruff was the defending champion, but chose not to participate.
Stephanie Vogt won the title by defeating Katarzyna Piter in the final 6–2, 6–4.

== Seeds ==
1. (Germany) Sarah Gronert (first round)
2. (France) Alizé Lim (first round)
3. (Netherlands) Bibiane Schoofs (first round)
4. (Brazil) Ana-Clara Duarte (first round)
5. (France) Séverine Beltrame (semifinals)
6. (Liechtenstein) Stephanie Vogt (champion)
7. (France) Nathalie Piquion (first round)
8. (Brazil) Vivian Segnini (second round)

== Main draw ==
=== Key ===
- Q = Qualifier
- WC = Wild card
- LL = Lucky loser
- Alt = Alternate
- SE = Special exempt
- PR = Protected ranking
- ITF = ITF entry
- JE = Junior exempt
- w/o = Walkover
- r = Retired
- d = Defaulted
- SR = Special ranking

=== Finals ===
Semifinals
(Poland) Katarzyna Piter	6	6
WC	(Netherlands) Angelique van der Meet	1	2
5	(France) Séverine Beltrame	6^{4}	1
6	(Liechtenstein) Stephanie Vogt	7^{7}	6

Final
(Poland) Katarzyna Piter	2	4
6	(Liechtenstein) Stephanie Vogt	6	6

=== Top half ===
First round
1	(Germany) S Gronert	3	2
(Poland) K Piter	6	6
(Bulgaria) A Naydenova	7	6
(Spain) I Ferrer Suárez	5	4
(Morocco) N Lalami	4	6	2
(Netherlands) R Hogenkamp	6	4	6
Q	(Russia) K Kirillova	6	7^{7}
7	(France) N Piquion	2	6^{3}
3	(Netherlands) B Schoofs	1	6^{2}
WC	(Netherlands) A van der Meet	6	7^{7}
Q	(Germany) J Ozga	6	6
(Venezuela) A Pérez	4	4
(Germany) S Werner	2	6	1
(Venezuela) A Gámiz	6	4	6
WC	(Netherlands) L Kerkhove	3	4
8	(Brazil) V Segnini	6	6

Second round
(Poland) K Piter	6	6
(Bulgaria) A Naydenova	4	0
(Netherlands) R Hogenkamp	2	2
Q	(Russia) K Kirillova	6	6
WC	(Netherlands) A van der Meet	7	6
Q	(Germany) J Ozga	5	4
(Venezuela) A Gámiz	6	6
8	(Brazil) V Segnini	4	1

Quarterfinals
(Poland) K Piter	6	6
(Russia) K Kirillova	3	2
WC	(Netherlands) A van der Meet	6	6
(Venezuela) A Gámiz	3	3

Semifinals
(Poland) K Piter	6	6
WC	(Netherlands) A van der Meet	1	2

=== Bottom half ===
First round
5	(France) S Beltrame	6	6
Q	(Germany) N Zander	0	4
WC	(Netherlands) D Harmsen	6	6
LL	(Netherlands) J van Bennekom	1	3
Q	(Netherlands) L van Riet	6	6
WC	(Netherlands) K Versteeg	1	0
Q	(Germany) C Witthöft	6	6
4	(Brazil) A-C Duarte	1	2
6	(Liechtenstein) S Vogt	7	6
(Romania) D Enache	5	3
Q	(Uzbekistan) A Khabibulina	1	2
Q	(Belarus) I Kremen	6	6
(Chile) A Koch-Benvenuto	5	6	7
Q	(Czech Republic) Z Zálabská	7	4	5
(Spain) E Fernández-Brugués	6	6
2	(France) A Lim	0	4

Second round
5	(France) S Beltrame	6	3	7^{10}
WC	(Netherlands) D Harmsen	4	6	6^{8}
Q	(Netherlands) L van Riet	0	2
Q	(Germany) C Witthöft	6	6
6	(Liechtenstein) S Vogt	6	6
Q	(Belarus) I Kremen	2	1
(Chile) A Koch-Benvenuto	2	6	2
(Spain) E Fernández-Brugués	6	4	6

Quarterfinals
5	(France) S Beltrame	6	6
Q	(Germany) C Witthöft	3	3
6	(Liechtenstein) S Vogt	6	3	6
(Spain) E Fernández-Brugués	1	6	3

Semifinals
5	(France) S Beltrame	6^{4}	1
6	(Liechtenstein) S Vogt	7^{7}	6
