= 2011 TEAN International – Women's doubles =

Women's doubles
- 2011 TEAN International

Final
- Champions: (Romania) Diana Enache (Netherlands) Daniëlle Harmsen
- Runners-up: (Poland) Katarzyna Piter (Poland) Barbara Sobaszkiewicz
- Score: 6–2, 6–7^{(4–7)}, [11–9]

Events
Singles	men	women
Doubles	men	women
← 2010 ·	TEAN International	· 2012 →

Daniëlle Harmsen and Julia Schruff were the defending champions, but Schruff chose not to participate. Harmsen competed with Diana Enache.

Harmsen and Enache won the title, defeating Katarzyna Piter and Barbara Sobaszkiewicz 6–2, 6–7^{(4–7)}, [11–9] in the final.

== Seeds ==
1. (Poland) Katarzyna Piter / (Poland) Barbara Sobaszkiewicz (final)
2. (Brazil) Ana-Clara Duarte / (France) Alizé Lim (first round)
3. (Romania) Diana Enache / (Netherlands) Daniëlle Harmsen (champions)
4. (Colombia) Karen Castiblanco / (Venezuela) Adriana Pérez (first round)

== Draw ==
=== Key ===
- Q = Qualifier
- WC = Wild card
- LL = Lucky loser
- Alt = Alternate
- SE = Special exempt
- PR = Protected ranking
- ITF = ITF entry
- JE = Junior exempt
- w/o = Walkover
- r = Retired
- d = Defaulted
- SR = Special ranking

=== Draw ===
First round
1	(Poland) K Piter (Poland) B Sobaszkiewicz	6	6
(Netherlands) B van de Velde (Netherlands) A van der Meet	3	4
(Poland) P Kania (Belarus) S Pirazhenka	3	5
(Liechtenstein) S Vogt (Germany) S Werner	6	7
4	(Colombia) K Castiblanco (Venezuela) A Pérez	2	2
(Ukraine) S Kovalets (Germany) N Zander	6	6
(Germany) J Ozga (Brazil) V Segnini	0	0
(Netherlands) R Hogenkamp (Netherlands) L Kerkhove	6	6
(France) N Piquion (Slovakia) R Tabak	6	1	[13]
(Venezuela) A Gámiz (Belarus) I Kremen	2	6	[11]
(Spain) E Fernández-Brugués (Spain) I Ferrer Suárez	2	2
3	(Romania) D Enache (Netherlands) D Harmsen	6	6
(Netherlands) K Kilsdonk (Netherlands) N van Uitert	6	6
(Belgium) E Boeykens (Netherlands) L van Riet	1	4
(Chile) A Koch-Benvenuto (Bulgaria) A Naydenova	6	7^{7}
2	(Brazil) A-C Duarte (France) A Lim	1	6^{5}

Quarterfinals
1	(Poland) K Piter (Poland) B Sobaszkiewicz	4	6	[12]
(Liechtenstein) S Vogt (Germany) S Werner	6	1	[10]
(Ukraine) S Kovalets (Germany) N Zander	3	3
(Netherlands) R Hogenkamp (Netherlands) L Kerkhove	6	6
(France) N Piquion (Slovakia) R Tabak	2	4
3	(Romania) D Enache (Netherlands) D Harmsen	6	6
(Netherlands) K Kilsdonk (Netherlands) N van Uitert	6	6^{1}	[10]
(Chile) A Koch-Benvenuto (Bulgaria) A Naydenova	2	7^{7}	[8]

Semifinals
1	(Poland) K Piter (Poland) B Sobaszkiewicz	6	3	[10]
(Netherlands) R Hogenkamp (Netherlands) L Kerkhove	3	6	[7]
3	(Romania) D Enache (Netherlands) D Harmsen	6	6
(Netherlands) K Kilsdonk (Netherlands) N van Uitert	4	1

Finals
1	(Poland) K Piter (Poland) B Sobaszkiewicz	2	7^{7}	[9]
3	(Romania) D Enache (Netherlands) D Harmsen	6	6^{4}	[11]
