= 2014 Copa Sevilla – Doubles =

Doubles
- 2014 Copa Sevilla

Final
- Champions: (Netherlands) Antal van der Duim (Netherlands) Boy Westerhof
- Runners-up: (Republic of Ireland) James Cluskey (Netherlands) Jesse Huta Galung
- Score: 7–6^{(7–3)}, 6–4

Events
Singles	Doubles
← 2013 ·	Copa Sevilla	· 2015 →

Alessandro Motti and Stéphane Robert were the defending champions, but did not compete this year.

Antal van der Duim and Boy Westerhof won the title, defeating James Cluskey and Jesse Huta Galung 7–6^{(7–3)}, 6–4 in the final.

== Seeds ==
1. (Republic of Ireland) James Cluskey / (Netherlands) Jesse Huta Galung (final)
2. (Italy) Flavio Cipolla / (Spain) Adrián Menéndez-Maceiras (semifinals)
3. (Netherlands) Antal van der Duim / (Netherlands) Boy Westerhof (champions)
4. (France) Jonathan Eysseric / (France) Pierre-Hugues Herbert (semifinals)

== Draw ==
=== Key ===
- Q = Qualifier
- WC = Wild card
- LL = Lucky loser
- Alt = Alternate
- SE = Special exempt
- PR = Protected ranking
- ITF = ITF entry
- JE = Junior exempt
- w/o = Walkover
- r = Retired
- d = Defaulted
- SR = Special ranking

=== Draw ===
First round
1	(Republic of Ireland) J Cluskey (Netherlands) J Huta Galung	6	6
WC	(Spain) Juan Jose Leal-Gomez (Spain) Alberto Rodriguez-Cervantes	1	1
(Spain) Eduard Esteve Lobato (Spain) D Vega Hernández	4	5
(Spain) D Gimeno Traver (Spain) D Muñoz de la Nava	6	7
4	(France) J Eysseric (France) P-H Herbert	6	6^{7}	[11]
(Spain) I Cervantes (Spain) J Lizariturry	4	7^{9}	[9]
(Austria) G Melzer (Belgium) Y Mertens	3	4
(Spain) P Carreño (Spain) R Ortega-Olmedo	6	6
(Spain) D Pérez Sanz (Spain) O Roca Batalla	2	6	[4]
WC	(Spain) Albert Alcaraz Ivorra (Spain) I Navarro	6	2	[10]
(Spain) G Granollers (Spain) J Samper Montaña	6^{7}	7	[5]
3	(Netherlands) A van der Duim (Netherlands) B Westerhof	7^{9}	5	[10]
WC	(Spain) Juan Pablo Canas Garcia (Spain) Pedro Dominguez Alonso	2	2
(Spain) R Carballés Baena (Japan) T Daniel	6	6
PR	(Portugal) F Gil (Italy) L Giustino	4	2
2	(Italy) F Cipolla (Spain) A Menéndez-Maceiras	6	6

Quarterfinals
1	(Republic of Ireland) J Cluskey (Netherlands) J Huta Galung	w/o
(Spain) D Gimeno Traver (Spain) D Muñoz de la Nava
4	(France) J Eysseric (France) P-H Herbert	6	6
(Spain) P Carreño (Spain) R Ortega-Olmedo	3	3
WC	(Spain) A Alcaraz Ivorra (Spain) I Navarro	3	4
3	(Netherlands) A van der Duim (Netherlands) B Westerhof	6	6
(Spain) R Carballés Baena (Japan) T Daniel	5	4
2	(Italy) F Cipolla (Spain) A Menéndez-Maceiras	7	6

Semifinals
1	(Republic of Ireland) J Cluskey (Netherlands) J Huta Galung	6	0	[11]
4	(France) J Eysseric (France) P-H Herbert	4	6	[9]
3	(Netherlands) A van der Duim (Netherlands) B Westerhof	6	3	[10]
2	(Italy) F Cipolla (Spain) A Menéndez-Maceiras	3	6	[7]

Final
1	(Republic of Ireland) J Cluskey (Netherlands) J Huta Galung	6^{3}	4
3	(Netherlands) A van der Duim (Netherlands) B Westerhof	7^{7}	6
