= 2013 TEAN International – Women's doubles =

Women's doubles
- 2013 TEAN International

Final
- Champions: (Netherlands) Cindy Burger (Chile) Daniela Seguel
- Runners-up: (Netherlands) Demi Schuurs (Netherlands) Eva Wacanno
- Score: 6–4, 6–1

Events
Singles	men	women
Doubles	men	women
- TEAN International

Diana Buzean and Daniëlle Harmsen were the defending champions, having won the event in 2012, but both players chose not to compete in 2013.

Cindy Burger and Daniela Seguel won the title, defeating Demi Schuurs and Eva Wacanno in the final, 6–4, 6–1.

== Seeds ==
1. (Argentina) María Irigoyen / (Bulgaria) Elitsa Kostova (quarterfinals)
2. (United States) Julia Cohen / (Poland) Katarzyna Kawa (quarterfinals, withdrew)
3. (Switzerland) Viktorija Golubic / (Bulgaria) Aleksandrina Naydenova (semifinals)
4. (Germany) Justine Ozga / (Germany) Anna Zaja (quarterfinals)

== Draw ==
Key

- Q = Qualifier
- WC = Wild card
- LL = Lucky loser
- Alt = Alternate
- ITF = ITF entry
- PR = Protected ranking
- SR = Special ranking
- SE = Special exempt
- JE = Junior exempt
- JR = Junior Accelerator Programme entrant
- CO = College Accelerator Programme entrant
- NG = Next Gen Accelerator Program entrant
- w/o = Walkover
- r = Retired
- d = Defaulted

First round
(Netherlands) C Burger (Chile) D Seguel	6	6
(Netherlands) J Hemmes (Netherlands) K van Rijn	2	4
3	(Switzerland) V Golubic (Bulgaria) A Naydenova	6	6
(Netherlands) G van de Graaf (Netherlands) M Zuur	1	2
(Netherlands) J Scheepens (Netherlands) M Wagemaker	3	5
(Argentina) C Pella (Mexico) AS Sánchez	6	7
(Netherlands) A van der Meet (Netherlands) B van de Velde	6	1	[3]
(Netherlands) D Schuurs (Netherlands) E Wacanno	3	6	[10]
(Netherlands) B Schreuder (Netherlands) R van der Zwaan	2	6^{2}
4	(Germany) J Ozga (Germany) A Zaja	6	7^{7}
(United States) B Pera (Belarus) S Pirazhenka	7^{8}	7^{8}
(Netherlands) R van der Hoek (Netherlands) V Podda	6^{6}	6^{6}

Quarterfinals
1	(Argentina) M Irigoyen (Bulgaria) E Kostova	1	5
(Netherlands) C Burger (Chile) D Seguel	6	7
3	(Switzerland) V Golubic (Bulgaria) A Naydenova	7	6
(Argentina) C Pella (Mexico) AS Sánchez	5	4
(Netherlands) D Schuurs (Netherlands) E Wacanno	2	6	[10]
4	(Germany) J Ozga (Germany) A Zaja	6	4	[7]
(United States) B Pera (Belarus) S Pirazhenka	w/o
2	(United States) J Cohen (Poland) K Kawa

Semifinals
(Netherlands) C Burger (Chile) D Seguel	7^{7}	6
3	(Switzerland) V Golubic (Bulgaria) A Naydenova	6^{5}	2
(Netherlands) D Schuurs (Netherlands) E Wacanno	6	7^{14}
(United States) B Pera (Belarus) S Pirazhenka	2	6^{12}

Final
(Netherlands) C Burger (Chile) D Seguel	6	6
(Netherlands) D Schuurs (Netherlands) E Wacanno	4	1
