= 2017 TEAN International – Doubles =

Doubles
- 2017 TEAN International

Final
- Champions: (Netherlands) Botic van de Zandschulp (Netherlands) Boy Westerhof
- Runners-up: (Bulgaria) Alexandar Lazov (Ukraine) Volodymyr Uzhylovskyi
- Score: 7–6^{(8–6)}, 7–5

Events
Singles	Doubles
← 2016 ·	TEAN International	· 2018 →

Daniel Masur and Jan-Lennard Struff were the defending champions but chose not to defend their title.

Botic van de Zandschulp and Boy Westerhof won the title after defeating Alexandar Lazov and Volodymyr Uzhylovskyi 7–6^{(8–6)}, 7–5 in the final.

== Seeds ==
1. (Germany) Kevin Krawietz / (Germany) Alexander Satschko (semifinals, withdrew)
2. (Australia) Rameez Junaid / (South Africa) Ruan Roelofse (first round)
3. (Poland) Tomasz Bednarek / (Netherlands) David Pel (quarterfinals)
4. (Philippines) Ruben Gonzales / (United States) Hunter Reese (semifinals)

== Draw ==
=== Key ===
- Q = Qualifier
- WC = Wild card
- LL = Lucky loser
- Alt = Alternate
- SE = Special exempt
- PR = Protected ranking
- ITF = ITF entry
- JE = Junior exempt
- w/o = Walkover
- r = Retired
- d = Defaulted
- SR = Special ranking

First round
1	(Germany) K Krawietz (Germany) A Satschko	6	4	[10]
WC	(Germany) R Kern (Germany) Tom Schönenberg	1	6	[3]
WC	(Netherlands) G Brouwer (Netherlands) J Sels	1	7	[6]
(Austria) D Pichler (France) G Sakharov	6	5	[10]
3	(Poland) T Bednarek (Netherlands) D Pel	6	6
(Italy) F Cipolla (Italy) M Viola	2	1
(Bulgaria) A Lazov (Ukraine) V Uzhylovskyi	1
(Ecuador) I Endara (Serbia) P Krstin	2^{r}
(Netherlands) S Griekspoor (Netherlands) T Griekspoor	3	4
(Poland) K Majchrzak (Austria) L Miedler	6	6
(Italy) Erik Crepaldi (Italy) R Ghedin	3	1
4	(Philippines) R Gonzales (United States) H Reese	6	6
WC	(Netherlands) Roy de Valk (Germany) P Torebko	1	4
(Brazil) A Ghem (Egypt) K-M Maamoun	6	6
(Netherlands) B van de Zandschulp (Netherlands) B Westerhof	5	6	[10]
2	(Australia) R Junaid (South Africa) R Roelofse	7	3	[2]

Quarterfinals
1	(Germany) K Krawietz (Germany) A Satschko	6	6
(Austria) D Pichler (France) G Sakharov	3	2
3	(Poland) T Bednarek (Netherlands) D Pel	5	4
(Bulgaria) A Lazov (Ukraine) V Uzhylovskyi	7	6
(Poland) K Majchrzak (Austria) L Miedler	5	7^{7}	[8]
4	(Philippines) R Gonzales (United States) H Reese	7	6^{4}	[10]
(Brazil) A Ghem (Egypt) K-M Maamoun	3	4
(Netherlands) B van de Zandschulp (Netherlands) B Westerhof	6	6

Semifinals
1	(Germany) K Krawietz (Germany) A Satschko
(Bulgaria) A Lazov (Ukraine) V Uzhylovskyi	w/o
4	(Philippines) R Gonzales (United States) H Reese	3	6	[4]
(Netherlands) B van de Zandschulp (Netherlands) B Westerhof	6	2	[10]

Final
(Bulgaria) A Lazov (Ukraine) V Uzhylovskyi	6^{6}	5
(Netherlands) B van de Zandschulp (Netherlands) B Westerhof	7^{8}	7
