= 2017 TEAN International =

- Date: 5 – 10 September
- Edition: 22nd
- Surface: Clay
- Location: Alphen aan den Rijn, Netherlands

Champions

Singles
- (Estonia) Jürgen Zopp

Doubles
- (Netherlands) Botic van de Zandschulp / (Netherlands) Boy Westerhof
← 2016 ·	TEAN International	· 2018 →

The 2017 TEAN International was a professional tennis tournament played on outdoor clay courts. It was the 22nd edition of the tournament which was part of the 2017 ATP Challenger Tour. It took place in Alphen aan den Rijn, Netherlands, on 5 – 10 September 2017.

== Singles main draw entrants ==
=== Seeds ===
Country	Player	Rank^{1}	Seed
ARG	Carlos Berlocq	95	1
POR	Pedro Sousa	127	2
GER	Oscar Otte	140	3
BEL	Arthur De Greef	143	4
ESP	Tommy Robredo	175	5
GER	Yannick Maden	185	6
FRA	Gleb Sakharov	189	7
CZE	Jan Šátral	195	8

- ^{1} Rankings are as of 28 August 2017.

=== Other entrants ===
The following players received wildcards into the singles main draw:

- (Netherlands) Thiemo de Bakker
- (Spain) Tommy Robredo
- (Netherlands) Jelle Sels
- (Netherlands) Boy Westerhof

The following players received entry into the singles main draw using protected rankings:

- (Italy) Flavio Cipolla
- (Spain) Daniel Muñoz de la Nava

The following players received entry from the qualifying draw:

- (Belgium) Julien Cagnina
- (Ecuador) Iván Endara
- (Germany) Kevin Krawietz
- (Estonia) Jürgen Zopp

== Champions ==
=== Singles ===
- (Estonia) Jürgen Zopp def. (Spain) Tommy Robredo 6–3, 6–2.

=== Doubles ===
- (Netherlands) Botic van de Zandschulp / (Netherlands) Boy Westerhof def. (Bulgaria) Alexandar Lazov / (Ukraine) Volodymyr Uzhylovskyi 7–6^{(8–6)}, 7–5.
