= 2012 TEAN International =

- Date: 3–9 September
- Edition: 17th (men); 12th (women)
- Surface: Clay
- Location: Alphen aan den Rijn, Netherlands

Champions

Men's singles
- (Netherlands) Thiemo de Bakker

Women's singles
- (Czech Republic) Sandra Záhlavová

Men's doubles
- (Australia) Rameez Junaid / (Germany) Simon Stadler

Women's doubles
- (Romania) Diana Buzean / (Netherlands) Daniëlle Harmsen
← 2011 ·	TEAN International	· 2013 →

The 2012 TEAN International was a professional tennis tournament played on clay courts. It was the 17th edition of the tournament which was part of the 2012 ATP Challenger Tour and the 12th edition of the tournament for the 2012 ITF Women's Circuit. It took place in Alphen aan den Rijn, Netherlands between 3 and 9 September 2011.

== ATP singles main draw entrants ==
=== Seeds ===
Country	Player	Rank^{1}	Seed
NED	Igor Sijsling	78	1
ESP	Daniel Gimeno Traver	96	2
BEL	Ruben Bemelmans	121	3
POR	João Sousa	122	4
ESP	Iñigo Cervantes Huegun	146	5
FRA	Jonathan Dasnières de Veigy	153	6
CZE	Jan Mertl	186	7
NED	Thiemo de Bakker	187	8

- ^{1} Rankings are as of August 27, 2012.

=== Other entrants ===
The following players received wildcards into the singles main draw:

- (Netherlands) Jeroen Benard
- (Netherlands) Stephan Fransen
- (Netherlands) Antal van der Duim
- (Netherlands) Nick van der Meer

The following players received entry from the qualifying draw:

- (Russia) Philip Davydenko
- (Germany) Bastian Knittel
- (Republic of Ireland) James McGee
- (Austria) Gerald Melzer

== WTA singles main draw entrants ==
=== Seeds ===
Country	Player	Rank^{1}	Seed
BLR	Anastasiya Yakimova	147	1
ROU	Mihaela Buzărnescu	165	2
CAN	Sharon Fichman	213	3
BRA	Teliana Pereira	214	4
GER	Kathrin Wörle	217	5
PER	Bianca Botto	218	6
FRA	Iryna Brémond	220	7
GBR	Naomi Broady	224	8

- ^{1} Rankings are as of August 27, 2012.

=== Other entrants ===
The following players received wildcards into the singles main draw:

- (Netherlands) Chayenne Ewijk
- (Netherlands) Lesley Kerkhove
- (Netherlands) Quirine Lemoine
- (Netherlands) Angelique van der Meet

The following players received entry from the qualifying draw:

- (Spain) Eva Fernández-Brugués
- (Venezuela) Andrea Gámiz
- (Georgia (country)) Sofia Kvatsabaia
- (Germany) Justine Ozga
- (Poland) Katarzyna Piter
- (Russia) Arina Rodionova
- (Austria) Janina Toljan
- (Germany) Anna Zaja

== Champions ==
=== Men's singles ===
- (Netherlands) Thiemo de Bakker def. (Germany) Simon Greul, 6–4, 6–2

=== Women's singles ===
- (Czech Republic) Sandra Záhlavová def. (Netherlands) Lesley Kerkhove, 7–5, 7–6^{(7–5)}

=== Men's doubles ===
- (Australia) Rameez Junaid / (Germany) Simon Stadler def. (Germany) Simon Greul / (Germany) Bastian Knittel, 4–6, 6–1, [10–5]

=== Women's doubles ===
- (Romania) Diana Buzean / (Netherlands) Daniëlle Harmsen def. (Italy) Corinna Dentoni / (Germany) Justine Ozga, 6–2, 6–0
