= 2009 TEAN International =

- Date: 7 – 13 September
- Edition: 14th
- Location: Alphen aan den Rijn, Netherlands

Champions

Singles
- (France) Stéphane Robert

Doubles
- (United Kingdom) Jonathan Marray / (United Kingdom) Jamie Murray
← 2008 ·	TEAN International	· 2010 →

The 2009 TEAN International was a professional tennis tournament played on outdoor red clay courts. It was the fourteenth edition of the tournament which was part of the 2009 ATP Challenger Tour. It took place in Alphen aan den Rijn, Netherlands between 7 and 13 September 2009.

== Singles main draw entrants ==
=== Seeds ===
Nationality	Player	Ranking*	Seeding
CRO	Roko Karanušić	111	1
USA	Michael Russell	112	2
UKR	Sergiy Stakhovsky	132	3
ITA	Paolo Lorenzi	136	4
NED	Thiemo de Bakker	151	5
FRA	Édouard Roger-Vasselin	158	6
FRA	Stéphane Robert	166	7
GER	Julian Reister	167	8

- Rankings are as of August 31, 2009.

=== Other entrants ===
The following players received wildcards into the singles main draw:

- (Netherlands) Michel Koning
- (Netherlands) Matwé Middelkoop
- (Netherlands) Igor Sijsling
- (Netherlands) Boy Westerhof

The following players received entry from the qualifying draw:

- (Netherlands) Justin Eleveld
- (Australia) Rameez Junaid
- (Finland) Timo Nieminen
- (Germany) Sebastian Rieschick (as a Lucky Loser)
- (Netherlands) Thomas Schoorel

== Champions ==
=== Singles ===
(France) Stéphane Robert def. (United States) Michael Russell, 7–6(2), 5–7, 7–6(5)

=== Doubles ===
(United Kingdom) Jonathan Marray / (United Kingdom) Jamie Murray def. (Ukraine) Sergei Bubka / (Ukraine) Sergiy Stakhovsky, 6–1, 6–4
