= 2014 TEAN International =

- Date: 1–7 September
- Edition: 19th (men); 14th (women)
- Surface: Clay
- Location: Alphen aan den Rijn, Netherlands

Champions

Men's singles
- (Netherlands) Jesse Huta Galung

Women's singles
- (Czech Republic) Denisa Allertová

Men's doubles
- (Netherlands) Antal van der Duim / (Netherlands) Boy Westerhof

Women's doubles
- (Sweden) Rebecca Peterson / (Netherlands) Eva Wacanno
← 2013 ·	TEAN International	· 2015 →

The 2014 TEAN International was a professional tennis tournament played on outdoor clay courts. It was the 19th edition of the tournament which was part of the 2014 ATP Challenger Tour and the 14th edition of the tournament for the 2014 ITF Women's Circuit. It took place in Alphen aan den Rijn, Netherlands, on 1 – 7 September 2014.

== ATP singles main draw entrants ==
=== Seeds ===
Country	Player	Rank^{1}	Seed
NED	Robin Haase	70	1
NED	Igor Sijsling	72	2
ESP	Daniel Gimeno Traver	101	3
NED	Thiemo de Bakker	140	4
ROM	Victor Hănescu	150	5
FRA	Axel Michon	180	6
ITA	Matteo Viola	193	7
ESP	Roberto Carballés Baena	212	8

- ^{1} Rankings are as of August 25, 2014.

=== Other entrants ===
The following players received wildcards into the singles main draw:

- (Netherlands) Thiemo de Bakker
- (Netherlands) Robin Haase
- (Netherlands) Jelle Sels
- (Netherlands) Igor Sijsling

The following players entered into the singles main draw as alternates:

- (Belgium) Kimmer Coppejans
- (Spain) Daniel Muñoz de la Nava

The following players received entry from the qualifying draw:

- (Germany) Moritz Baumann
- (Netherlands) Wesley Koolhof
- (Netherlands) Matwé Middelkoop
- (Germany) Matthias Wunner

== WTA singles main draw entrants ==
=== Seeds ===
Country	Player	Rank^{1}	Seed
BRA	Teliana Pereira	91	1
GER	Dinah Pfizenmaier	131	2
NED	Arantxa Rus	153	3
NED	Richèl Hogenkamp	165	4
CZE	Denisa Allertová	172	5
ROU	Alexandra Cadanțu	174	6
ESP	Beatriz García Vidagany	215	7
SWE	Rebecca Peterson	220	8

- ^{1} Rankings are as of August 25, 2014.

=== Other entrants ===
The following players received wildcards into the singles main draw:

- (Netherlands) Inger van Dijkman
- (Netherlands) Quirine Lemoine
- (Netherlands) Demi Schuurs
- (Netherlands) Mandy Wagemaker

The following players received entry from the qualifying draw:

- (Argentina) Tatiana Búa
- (Belgium) Catherine Chantraine
- (Spain) Inés Ferrer Suárez
- (Germany) Nicola Geuer
- (Belgium) Deborah Kerfs
- (Germany) Tamara Korpatsch
- (Germany) Antonia Lottner
- (Spain) Sara Sorribes Tormo

The following players received entry by a lucky loser spot:

- (Netherlands) Jainy Scheepens
- (Russia) Natalia Orlova

== Champions ==
=== Men's singles ===
- (Netherlands) Jesse Huta Galung def. (Spain) Daniel Muñoz de la Nava 6–3, 6–4

=== Women's singles ===
- (Czech Republic) Denisa Allertová def. (Brazil) Teliana Pereira 6–3, ret.

=== Men's doubles ===
- (Netherlands) Antal van der Duim / (Netherlands) Boy Westerhof def. (Spain) Rubén Ramírez Hidalgo / (Italy) Matteo Viola 6–1, 6–3

=== Women's doubles ===
- (Sweden) Rebecca Peterson / (Netherlands) Eva Wacanno def. (Netherlands) Richèl Hogenkamp / (Netherlands) Lesley Kerkhove 6–4, 6–4
