= 2013 TEAN International – Men's doubles =

Men's doubles
- 2013 TEAN International

Final
- Champions: (Netherlands) Antal van der Duim (Netherlands) Boy Westerhof
- Runners-up: (Germany) Simon Greul (Netherlands) Wesley Koolhof
- Score: 4–6, 6–3, [12–10]

Events
Singles	men	women
Doubles	men	women
- TEAN International

Rameez Junaid and Simon Stadler are the defending champions, but the latter decided not to compete this year thus Junaid is playing alongside Jesse Huta Galung.

Antal van der Duim and Boy Westerhof won the title, defeating Simon Greul and Wesley Koolhof in the final, 4–6, 6–3, [12–10].

== Seeds ==
1. (Netherlands) Jesse Huta Galung / (Australia) Rameez Junaid (semifinals)
2. (Netherlands) Thiemo de Bakker / (Netherlands) Stephan Fransen (semifinals)
3. (Germany) Gero Kretschmer / (Germany) Alexander Satschko (quarterfinals)
4. (Germany) Andreas Beck / (Germany) Dominik Meffert (first round)

== Draw ==
Key

- Q = Qualifier
- WC = Wild card
- LL = Lucky loser
- Alt = Alternate
- ITF = ITF entry
- PR = Protected ranking
- SR = Special ranking
- SE = Special exempt
- JE = Junior exempt
- JR = Junior Accelerator Programme entrant
- CO = College Accelerator Programme entrant
- NG = Next Gen Accelerator Program entrant
- w/o = Walkover
- r = Retired
- d = Defaulted

=== Draw ===
First round
1	(Netherlands) J Huta Galung (Australia) R Junaid	6	6
(Italy) A Brizzi (Italy) S Vagnozzi	1	4
(Belgium) R Bemelmans (Belgium) Y Mertens	4	4
WC	(Netherlands) Romano Frantzen (Netherlands) T Schoorel	6	6
4	(Germany) A Beck (Germany) D Meffert	3	7^{7}	[10]
(Italy) R Bellotti (Indonesia) C Rungkat	6	6^{1}	[12]
WC	(Netherlands) A van der Duim (Netherlands) B Westerhof	6	6
(Israel) D Sela (Germany) C-M Stebe	1	4
(Germany) S Greul (Netherlands) W Koolhof	6	2	[10]
(Bosnia and Herzegovina) D Džumhur (Germany) P Torebko	0	6	[4]
(United States) V Mirzadeh (United States) D Zivkovic	6^{3}	4
3	(Germany) G Kretschmer (Germany) A Satschko	7^{7}	6
WC	(Netherlands) M Middelkoop (Netherlands) Miliaan Niesten	6	6
(Spain) D Gimeno-Traver (Spain) G Granollers	4	4
(France) G Burquier (France) D Guez	3	4
2	(Netherlands) T de Bakker (Netherlands) S Fransen	6	6

Quarterfinals
1	(Netherlands) J Huta Galung (Australia) R Junaid	7^{7}	6
WC	(Netherlands) R Frantzen (Netherlands) T Schoorel	6^{1}	3
(Italy) R Bellotti (Indonesia) C Rungkat	1	4
WC	(Netherlands) A van der Duim (Netherlands) B Westerhof	6	6
(Germany) S Greul (Netherlands) W Koolhof	3	6	[10]
3	(Germany) G Kretschmer (Germany) A Satschko	6	3	[8]
WC	(Netherlands) M Middelkoop (Netherlands) M Niesten	3	2
2	(Netherlands) T de Bakker (Netherlands) S Fransen	6	6

Semifinals
(Netherlands) J Huta Galung (Australia) R Junaid	6^{5}	7^{7}	[10]
WC	(Netherlands) A van der Duim (Netherlands) B Westerhof	7^{7}	6^{3}	[12]
(Germany) S Greul (Netherlands) W Koolhof	6	3	[13]
2	(Netherlands) T de Bakker (Netherlands) S Fransen	4	6	[11]

Final
WC	(Netherlands) A van der Duim (Netherlands) B Westerhof	4	6	[12]
(Germany) S Greul (Netherlands) W Koolhof	6	3	[10]
