= 2012 TEAN International – Men's singles =

Men's singles
- 2012 TEAN International

Final
- Champion: (Netherlands) Thiemo de Bakker
- Runner-up: (Germany) Simon Greul
- Score: 6–4, 6–2

Events
Singles	men	women
Doubles	men	women
- TEAN International

Igor Sijsling is the defending champion, but withdrew prior to the tournament because of a stomach injury.
Thiemo de Bakker won the title, defeating Simon Greul 6–4, 6–2 in the final.

== Seeds ==
1. (Netherlands) Igor Sijsling (withdrew due to a stomach injury)
2. (Spain) Daniel Gimeno-Traver (semifinals)
3. (Belgium) Ruben Bemelmans (second round, retired)
4. (Portugal) João Sousa (semifinals)
5. (Spain) Iñigo Cervantes Huegun (second round)
6. (France) Jonathan Dasnières de Veigy (first round)
7. (Czech Republic) Jan Mertl (second round)
8. (Netherlands) Thiemo de Bakker (champion)

== Draw ==
Key

- Q = Qualifier
- WC = Wild card
- LL = Lucky loser
- Alt = Alternate
- ITF = ITF entry
- PR = Protected ranking
- SR = Special ranking
- SE = Special exempt
- JE = Junior exempt
- JR = Junior Accelerator Programme entrant
- CO = College Accelerator Programme entrant
- NG = Next Gen Accelerator Program entrant
- w/o = Walkover
- r = Retired
- d = Defaulted

=== Finals ===
Semifinals
8	(Netherlands) Thiemo de Bakker	7^{7}	6
4	(Portugal) João Sousa	6^{3}	4
(Germany) Simon Greul	6	7
2	(Spain) Daniel Gimeno-Traver	4	5

Final
8	(Netherlands) Thiemo de Bakker	6	6
(Germany) Simon Greul	4	2

=== Top half ===
First round
LL	(Netherlands) W Koolhof	6	6
Q	(Russia) P Davydenko	4	2
WC	(Netherlands) S Fransen	4	1
(Hungary) A Balázs	6	6
(Argentina) S Decoud	1	0^{r}
(Portugal) P Sousa	6	1
WC	(Netherlands) Antal van der Inch	6	5	3
8	(Netherlands) T de Bakker	3	7	6
4	(Portugal) J Sousa	6	1	6
(Czech Republic) M Michalička	4	6	2
(Netherlands) T Schoorel	6	6^{5}	6
(Netherlands) B Westerhof	4	7^{7}	4
Q	(Germany) B Knittel	4	0
(Belgium) Y Mertens	6	6
(Ukraine) I Sergeyev	6	6^{2}	6
6	(France) J Dasnières de Veigy	2	7^{7}	4

Second round
LL	(Netherlands) W Koolhof	2	6	7
(Hungary) A Balázs	6	4	5
(Portugal) P Sousa	1	4
8	(Netherlands) T de Bakker	6	6
4	(Portugal) J Sousa	6	6
(Netherlands) T Schoorel	1	2
(Belgium) Y Mertens	6	3	7
(Ukraine) I Sergeyev	4	6	5

Quarterfinals
LL	(Netherlands) W Koolhof	2	2
8	(Netherlands) T de Bakker	6	6
4	(Portugal) J Sousa	6	6
(Belgium) Y Mertens	4	2

Semifinals
8	(Netherlands) T de Bakker	7^{7}	6
4	(Portugal) J Sousa	6^{3}	4

=== Bottom half ===
First round
5	(Spain) Í Cervantes	7^{7}	6
(Netherlands) M Middelkoop	6^{4}	4
WC	(Netherlands) Nick van der Meer	3	6	3
(Spain) I Navarro	6	3	6
(Germany) S Greul	6	6
(France) N Devilder	4	3
LL	(Germany) Moritz Baumann	4	4
3	(Belgium) R Bemelmans	6	6
7	(Czech Republic) J Mertl	7^{7}	7^{7}
Q	(Austria) G Melzer	6^{3}	6^{4}
WC	(Netherlands) Jeroen Benard	6	2	3
(Germany) P Torebko	4	6	6
Q	(Republic of Ireland) J McGee	3	4
(Germany) J-L Struff	6	6
(Netherlands) J Huta Galung	6^{0}	4
2	(Spain) D Gimeno-Traver	7^{7}	6

Second round
5	(Spain) Í Cervantes	2	2
(Spain) I Navarro	6	6
(Germany) S Greul	7^{7}	1
3	(Belgium) R Bemelmans	6^{5}	1^{r}
7	(Czech Republic) J Mertl	1	6^{4}
(Germany) P Torebko	6	7^{7}
(Germany) J-L Struff	7^{7}	6^{8}	2
2	(Spain) D Gimeno-Traver	6^{5}	7^{10}	6

Quarterfinals
(Spain) I Navarro	1	3
(Germany) S Greul	6	6
(Germany) P Torebko	4	6	5
2	(Spain) D Gimeno-Traver	6	4	7

Semifinals
(Germany) S Greul	6	7
2	(Spain) D Gimeno-Traver	4	5
