= Angelique van der Meet =

Dutch tennis player

- Country (sports): Netherlands
- Born: 20 February 1991 (age 34) 's-Heer Abtskerke, Netherlands
- Prize money: $54,431

Singles
- Career record: 158–78
- Career titles: 4 ITF
- Highest ranking: 228 (5 August 2013)

Grand Slam singles results
- US Open: Q2 (2013)

Doubles
- Career record: 35–31
- Career titles: 3 ITF
- Highest ranking: 319 (24 June 2013)

Team competitions
- Fed Cup: 1–0

Angelique van der Meet (born 20 February 1991) is a former professional Dutch tennis player.

Van der Meet won four singles and three doubles titles on the ITF Circuit in her career. On 5 August 2013, she reached her best singles ranking of world No. 228. On 24 June 2013, she peaked at No. 319 in the doubles rankings.

Van der Meet made her debut for the Netherlands Fed Cup team in February 2013, winning her doubles rubber with Bibiane Schoofs against Anne Kremer and Claudine Schaul of Luxembourg.

== ITF finals ==
=== Singles: 11 (4–7) ===
| Legend $100,000 tournaments $75,000 tournaments $50,000 tournaments $25,000 tournaments $10,000 tournaments | Finals by surface Hard (0–0) Clay (4–7) Grass (0–0) Carpet (0–0) |

| Outcome | No. | Date | Tournament | Surface | Opponent | Score |
|---|---|---|---|---|---|---|
| Runner-up | 1. | 25 August 2009 | ITF Enschede, Netherlands | Clay | (Netherlands) Richèl Hogenkamp | 0–6, 3–6 |
| Runner-up | 2. | 1 September 2009 | ITF Almere, Netherlands | Clay | (Netherlands) Kiki Bertens | 2–6, 4–6 |
| Winner | 1. | 8 June 2010 | ITF Apeldoorn, Netherlands | Clay | (Netherlands) Kiki Bertens | 7–5, 6–3 |
| Runner-up | 3. | 15 June 2010 | ITF Alkmaar, Netherlands | Clay | (Netherlands) Marcella Koek | 3–6, 3–6 |
| Winner | 2. | 19 July 2010 | ITF Knokke, Belgium | Clay | (Belgium) Sofie Oyen | 6–2, 6–0 |
| Winner | 3. | 30 August 2010 | ITF Middelburg, Netherlands | Clay | (Netherlands) Lesley Kerkhove | 6–1, 6–3 |
| Winner | 4. | 25 June 2012 | ITF Breda, Netherlands | Clay | (Italy) Agnese Zucchini | 6–2, 6–4 |
| Runner-up | 4. | 20 August 2012 | ITF Charleroi, Belgium | Clay | (Germany) Anna-Lena Friedsam | 4–6, 6–7^{(5)} |
| Runner-up | 5. | 17 September 2012 | ITF Dobrich, Bulgaria | Clay | (Germany) Anne Schäfer | 2–6, 2–6 |
| Runner-up | 6. | 1 July 2013 | ITF Middelburg, Netherlands | Clay | (France) Irena Pavlovic | 3–6, 4–6 |
| Runner-up | 7. | 30 June 2014 | ITF Middelburg, Netherlands | Clay | (Russia) Evgeniya Rodina | 5–7, 5–7 |

=== Doubles: 5 (3–2) ===
| Legend $100,000 tournaments $75,000 tournaments $50,000 tournaments $25,000 tournaments $10,000 tournaments | Finals by surface Hard (0–0) Clay (3–2) Grass (0–0) Carpet (0–0) |

| Outcome | No. | Date | Tournament | Surface | Partner | Opponents | Score |
|---|---|---|---|---|---|---|---|
| Winner | 1. | 19 July 2010 | ITF Knokke, Belgium | Clay | (Netherlands) Bernice van de Velde | (Belgium) Elyne Boeykens (Belgium) Nicky Van Dyck | 6–1, 6–3 |
| Runner-up | 1. | 30 August 2010 | ITF Middelburg, Netherlands | Clay | (Netherlands) Bernice van de Velde | (Netherlands) Quirine Lemoine (Netherlands) Sabine van der Sar | 1–6, 0–6 |
| Runner-up | 2. | 2 July 2012 | ITF Middelburg, Netherlands | Clay | (Netherlands) Bernice van de Velde | (Japan) Junri Namigata (Japan) Yurika Sema | 3–6, 1–6 |
| Winner | 2. | 1 April 2013 | ITF Jackson, United States | Clay | (Belarus) Ilona Kremen | (Bolivia) María Fernanda Álvarez Terán (Paraguay) Verónica Cepede Royg | 6–3, 6–4 |
| Winner | 3. | 30 June 2014 | ITF Middelburg, Netherlands | Clay | (Netherlands) Bernice van de Velde | (Russia) Veronika Kudermetova (Russia) Evgeniya Rodina | 7–6^{(4)}, 3–6, [10–5] |

== Fed Cup participation ==
=== Doubles ===
| Edition | Stage | Date | Location | Against | Surface | Partner | Opponents | W/L | Score |
|---|---|---|---|---|---|---|---|---|---|
| 2013 Fed Cup; Europe/Africa Zone Group I | R/R | 9 February 2013 | Eilat, Israel | Luxembourg | Hard | (Netherlands) Bibiane Schoofs | (Luxembourg) Anne Kremer (Luxembourg) Claudine Schaul | Win | 6–2, 6–3 |
