= Antal van der Duim =

Dutch tennis player

- Country (sports): Netherlands
- Born: 16 September 1987 (age 38) Vinkega, Netherlands
- Height: 1.87 m (6 ft 2 in)
- Turned pro: 2004
- Plays: Right-handed (two-handed backhand)
- Prize money: US$203,528

Singles
- Career record: 0–1
- Career titles: 0
- Highest ranking: No. 214 (31 October 2016)

Grand Slam singles results
- US Open: Q1 (2016)

Doubles
- Career record: 0–3
- Career titles: 0
- Highest ranking: No. 149 (20 April 2015)
- Last updated on: 5 June 2021.

Antal van der Duim (born 16 September 1987) is a Dutch professional tennis player. He competes mainly on the ATP Challenger Tour and ITF Futures, both in singles and doubles. He reached his highest ATP singles ranking, No. 214 on 31 October 2016, and his highest ATP doubles ranking, No. 149, on 20 April 2015.

== ATP Challenger and ITF Futures finals ==
=== Singles: 30 (14–16) ===
Legend ATP Challenger (0–0) ITF Futures (14–16)	Finals by surface Hard (8–9) Clay (5–4) Grass (0–0) Carpet (1–3)

Result	W–L	Date	Tournament	Tier	Surface	Opponent	Score
Loss	0–1	Mar 2006	China F4, Jiangmen	Futures	Hard	(China) Yu Xinyuan	1–6, 2–6
Loss	0–2	Mar 2006	China F5, Guangzhou	Futures	Hard	(United States) Jonathan Chu	6–7^{(4–7)}, 7–6^{(7–0)}, 0–4 ret.
Loss	0–3	Sep 2006	Netherlands F7, Almere	Futures	Clay	(Netherlands) Jesse Huta Galung	2–6, 3–6
Loss	0–4	Jan 2007	Austria F1, Bergheim	Futures	Carpet	(Czech Republic) Jan Vacek	3–6, 3–6
Win	1–4	Mar 2007	Israel F1, Ramat HaSharon	Futures	Hard	(Germany) Alexander Satschko	6–4, 6–1
Loss	1–5	Nov 2007	China F8, Wuxi	Futures	Hard	(Sweden) Ervin Eleskovic	3–6, 2–6
Loss	1–6	Nov 2007	China F9, Suzhou	Futures	Hard	(China) Yan Bai	1–6, 0–3 ret.
Win	2–6	May 2011	Italy F9, Naples	Futures	Clay	(Australia) James Lemke	6–2, 6–4
Loss	2–7	Jul 2011	France F12, Saint-Gervais	Futures	Clay	(France) Grégoire Burquier	6–4, 5–7, 2–6
Win	3–7	Aug 2011	Netherlands F5, Enschede	Futures	Clay	(France) Nicolas Devilder	4–6, 6–4, 6–3
Win	4–7	Apr 2012	Italy F4, Vercelli	Futures	Clay	(Austria) Michael Linzer	6–3, 6–2
Loss	4–8	Mar 2013	Bahrain F1, Manama	Futures	Hard	(Spain) Jordi Samper Montaña	4–6, 6–4, 5–7
Loss	4–9	Sep 2013	Netherlands F6, Rotterdam	Futures	Clay	(Austria) Marc Rath	4–6, 6–2, 3–6
Win	5–9	Mar 2014	India F1, Chandigarh	Futures	Hard	(India) Vishnu Vardhan	7–5, 6–3
Win	6–9	Mar 2014	Great Britain F7, Preston	Futures	Hard	(Netherlands) Thomas Schoorel	7–6^{(7–1)}, 6–2
Win	7–9	Apr 2014	Qatar F3, Doha	Futures	Hard	(Switzerland) Adrien Bossel	6–7^{(5–7)}, 6–3, 6–3
Loss	7–10	Jun 2014	Netherlands F1, Amstelveen	Futures	Clay	(Netherlands) Boy Westerhof	7–6^{(8–6)}, 3–6, 4–6
Loss	7–11	Oct 2014	Zimbabwe F2, Harare	Futures	Hard	(Netherlands) Boy Westerhof	7–6^{(7–5)}, 5–7, 0–3 ret.
Win	8–11	Nov 2014	Dominican Republic F1, La Romana	Futures	Clay	(United States) Connor Smith	6–7^{(2–7)}, 7–6^{(7–5)}, 6–1
Loss	8–12	Feb 2015	France F3, Feucherolles	Futures	Hard	(Canada) Filip Peliwo	2–6, 4–6
Win	9–12	Mar 2015	USA F9, Sunrise	Futures	Clay	(Brazil) Thales Turini	6–4, 5–7, 6–0
Win	10–12	Nov 2015	Estonia F2, Tartu	Futures	Carpet	(Russia) Evgeny Karlovskiy	4–6, 6–1, 6–4
Loss	10–13	Nov 2015	Estonia F4, Pärnu	Futures	Hard	(Czech Republic) Petr Michnev	2–6, 1–6
Win	11–13	Dec 2015	Nigeria F4, Lagos	Futures	Hard	(Zimbabwe) Takanyi Garanganga	6–3, 7–6^{(7–0)}
Loss	11–14	Jan 2016	France F3, Veigy-Foncenex	Futures	Carpet	(France) Hugo Nys	4–6, 3–6
Loss	11–15	Mar 2016	France F4, Lille	Futures	Hard	(Belgium) Yannick Mertens	2–6, 4–6
Win	12–15	Mar 2016	Italy F2, Basiglio	Futures	Hard	(France) Hugo Grenier	7–6^{(7–2)}, 6–2
Win	13–15	Apr 2016	Nigeria F1, Abuja	Futures	Hard	(Egypt) Mohamed Safwat	7–5, 6–3
Win	14–15	May 2016	Nigeria F3, Abuja	Futures	Hard	(Serbia) Ilija Vucic	6–4, 6–2
Loss	14–16	Jan 2018	France F3, Veigy-Foncenex	Futures	Carpet	(Italy) Alessandro Bega	6–4, 4–6, 6–7^{(7–9)}

=== Doubles: 56 (38–18) ===
Legend ATP Challenger (10–1) ITF Futures (28–17)	Finals by surface Hard (16–9) Clay (21–7) Grass (0–0) Carpet (1–2)

Result	W–L	Date	Tournament	Tier	Surface	Partner	Opponents	Score
Win	1–0	Mar 2006	China F3, Shenzhen	Futures	Hard	(Netherlands) Jesse Huta Galung	(Chinese Taipei) Lee Hsin-han (China) Yu Hiu Tung	7–5, 6–1
Win	2–0	May 2006	Spain F14, Lleida	Futures	Clay	(Netherlands) Igor Sijsling	(Spain) Carlos Rexach-Itoiz (Spain) Héctor Ruiz-Cadenas	6–2, 7–6^{(7–2)}
Loss	2–1	Aug 2006	Germany F10, Ingolstadt	Futures	Clay	(Netherlands) Michel Meijer	(Germany) Tobias Kamke (Germany) Julian Reister	6–3, 2–6, 0–6
Loss	2–2	Aug 2006	Germany F11, Essen	Futures	Clay	(Netherlands) Boy Westerhof	(Belgium) Ruben Bemelmans (Belgium) Niels Desein	6–1, 5–7, 5–7
Win	3–2	Sep 2006	Netherlands F7, Almere	Futures	Clay	(Netherlands) Thiemo de Bakker	(Netherlands) Igor Sijsling (Netherlands) Jesse Huta Galung	4–6, 6–1, 6–4
Win	4–2	Oct 2006	Spain F32, El Ejido	Futures	Hard	(Greece) Alexandros Jakupovic	(Spain) Guillermo Alcaide (Portugal) Goncalo Nicau	4–6, 7–6^{(7–5)}, 7–6^{(7–3)}
Loss	4–3	Mar 2007	Israel F1, Ramat HaSharon	Futures	Hard	(Netherlands) Remko De Rijke	(Czech Republic) Jiří Krkoška (Slovakia) Jan Stancik	2–6, 0–6
Loss	4–4	Apr 2007	UAE F2, Dubai	Futures	Hard	(Canada) Pierre-Ludovic Duclos	(Australia) Rameez Junaid (Pakistan) Aisam Qureshi	1–6, 3–6
Win	5–4	May 2007	Greece F3, Kalamata	Futures	Carpet	(United States) James Cerretani	(United States) Patrick Briaud (Brazil) Márcio Torres	6–3, 6–2
Win	6–4	Aug 2007	Saransk, Russia	Challenger	Clay	(Netherlands) Boy Westerhof	(Kazakhstan) Alexey Kedryuk (Italy) Uros Vico	2–6, 7–6^{(7–3)}, [11–9]
Win	7–4	Aug 2007	Italy F27, Bolzano	Futures	Clay	(Netherlands) Boy Westerhof	(Argentina) Antonio Pastorino (Argentina) Damián Patriarca	2–6, 7–6^{(7–4)}, 6–4
Win	8–4	Aug 2007	Manerbio, Italy	Challenger	Clay	(Netherlands) Boy Westerhof	(Portugal) Fred Gil (Spain) Alberto Martín	7–6^{(7–4)}, 3–6, [10–8]
Win	9–4	Oct 2007	Spain F37, Córdoba	Futures	Hard	(Netherlands) Boy Westerhof	(Spain) Guillermo Alcaide (Spain) Sergio Pérez Pérez	6–7^{(6–8)}, 7–5, [10–7]
Win	10–4	Nov 2007	China F8, Wuxi	Futures	Hard	(Netherlands) Boy Westerhof	(China) Gong Maoxin (China) Zhe Li	7–6^{(7–5)}, 6–4
Win	11–4	Nov 2007	China F9, Suzhou	Futures	Hard	(Netherlands) Boy Westerhof	(Montenegro) Daniel Danilović (Sweden) Ervin Eleskovic	7–6^{(7–5)}, 6–1
Win	12–4	Dec 2008	Dominican Republic F4, Santo Domingo	Futures	Hard	(Netherlands) Tim Van Terheijden	(Ukraine) Ivan Anikanov (Austria) Philipp Oswald	6–3, 5–7, [10–8]
Loss	12–5	Apr 2009	Turkey F5, Antalya	Futures	Hard	(Netherlands) Thomas Schoorel	(Denmark) Martin Pedersen (Germany) Sebastian Rieschick	5–7, 3–6
Loss	12–6	May 2009	Italy F11, Parma	Futures	Clay	(Australia) Greg Jones	(Italy) Walter Trusendi (Argentina) Juan-Martín Aranguren	2–6, 3–6
Loss	12–7	Aug 2009	Italy F23, Bolzano	Futures	Clay	(Romania) Marius Copil	(Italy) Manuel Jorquera (Portugal) Leonardo Tavares	7–6^{(7–2)}, 3–6, [5–10]
Win	13–7	Aug 2009	Netherlands F4, Enschede	Futures	Clay	(Netherlands) Boy Westerhof	(United States) Colt Gaston (United States) Phillip Simmonds	7–5, 6–2
Win	14–7	Sep 2009	Netherlands F5, Almere	Futures	Clay	(Netherlands) Boy Westerhof	(Germany) Martin Emmrich (Sweden) Andreas Siljeström	7–6^{(7–3)}, 7–6^{(8–6)}
Win	15–7	Feb 2010	Azerbaijan F2, Baku	Futures	Hard	(Netherlands) Matwé Middelkoop	(China) Di Wu (China) Ze Zhang	7–6^{(10–8)}, 7–5
Loss	15–8	Mar 2011	Portugal F2, Loulé	Futures	Hard	(Portugal) Goncalo Falcao	(Germany) Steven Moneke (Germany) Marc Sieber	5–7, 4–6
Win	16–8	Jun 2011	Netherlands F1, Almere	Futures	Clay	(Netherlands) Tim Van Terheijden	(Argentina) Pablo Galdón (Brazil) Fernando Romboli	6–4, 6–3
Win	17–8	Jun 2011	Netherlands F3, Breda	Futures	Clay	(Netherlands) Tim Van Terheijden	(Germany) Bastian Knittel (Germany) Alexander Satschko	6–4, 5–7, [10–1]
Win	18–8	Jul 2011	France F12, Saint-Gervais	Futures	Clay	(India) Divij Sharan	(France) Simon Cauvard (France) Baptiste Dupuy	6–3, 6–2
Win	19–8	Sep 2011	Alphen aan den Rijn, Netherlands	Challenger	Clay	(Netherlands) Thiemo de Bakker	(Netherlands) Matwé Middelkoop (Netherlands) Igor Sijsling	6–4, 6–7^{(4–7)}, [10–6]
Loss	19–9	Sep 2011	Portugal F4, Espinho	Futures	Clay	(Portugal) Goncalo Falcao	(France) Gianni Mina (France) Julien Obry	6–7^{(3–7)}, 3–6
Win	20–9	Jan 2012	Israel F2, Eilat	Futures	Hard	(Italy) Claudio Grassi	(South Africa) Jean Andersen (South Africa) Ruan Roelofse	6–3, 7–5
Loss	20–10	Apr 2012	Italy F5, Padova	Futures	Clay	(Italy) Claudio Grassi	(Germany) Bastian Knittel (Italy) Matteo Volante	3–6, 0–6
Win	21–10	Jun 2012	Netherlands F1, Zuidwolde	Futures	Clay	(Netherlands) Thiemo de Bakker	(Sweden) Patrik Rosenholm (Sweden) Michael Ryderstedt	6–4, 6–0
Win	22–10	Jul 2012	Scheveningen, Netherlands	Challenger	Clay	(Netherlands) Boy Westerhof	(Germany) Simon Stadler (Australia) Rameez Junaid	6–4, 5–7, [10–7]
Win	23–10	Mar 2013	Russia F2, Yoshkar-Ola	Futures	Hard	(Netherlands) Boy Westerhof	(Belarus) Andrei Vasilevski (Belarus) Egor Gerasimov	7–6^{(10–8)}, 6–3
Win	24–10	Jul 2013	Scheveningen, Netherlands	Challenger	Clay	(Netherlands) Boy Westerhof	(Germany) Alexander Satschko (Germany) Gero Kretschmer	6–3, 6–3
Win	25–10	Aug 2013	Italy F20, Bolzano	Futures	Clay	(Austria) Marc Rath	(Italy) Thomas Holzer (Italy) Patrick Prader	6–4, 7–5
Win	26–10	Sep 2013	Netherlands F6, Rotterdam	Futures	Clay	(Netherlands) Boy Westerhof	(Netherlands) Stephan Fransen (Netherlands) Wesley Koolhof	6–7^{(4–7)}, 6–4, [11–9]
Win	27–10	Sep 2013	Alphen aan den Rijn, Netherlands	Challenger	Clay	(Netherlands) Boy Westerhof	(Germany) Simon Greul (Netherlands) Wesley Koolhof	4–6, 6–3, [12–10]
Win	28–10	Oct 2013	Armenia F2, Yerevan	Futures	Clay	(Netherlands) Boy Westerhof	(Austria) Michael Linzer (Germany) Marc Meigel	6–4, 6–4
Win	29–10	Jun 2014	Netherlands F1, Amstelveen	Futures	Clay	(Netherlands) Boy Westerhof	(Brazil) Joao Walendowsky (Brazil) Bruno Sant'Anna	6–1, 7–5
Win	30–10	Sep 2014	Alphen aan den Rijn, Netherlands	Challenger	Clay	(Netherlands) Boy Westerhof	(Italy) Matteo Viola (Spain) Rubén Ramírez Hidalgo	6–1, 6–3
Win	31–10	Sep 2014	Seville, Spain	Challenger	Clay	(Netherlands) Boy Westerhof	(Republic of Ireland) James Cluskey (Netherlands) Jesse Huta Galung	7–6^{(7–3)}, 6–4
Win	32–10	Oct 2014	Zimbabwe F1, Harare	Futures	Hard	(Netherlands) Boy Westerhof	(France) Grégoire Barrère (France) Arthur Surreaux	3–6, 6–2, [10–7]
Win	33–10	Mar 2015	Great Britain F4, Wirral	Futures	Hard	(Netherlands) Boy Westerhof	(United Kingdom) David Rice (United Kingdom) Daniel Cox	6–2, 4–6, [10–2]
Win	34–10	Apr 2015	Le Gosier, Guadeloupe	Challenger	Hard	(United States) James Cerretani	(Netherlands) Wesley Koolhof (Netherlands) Matwé Middelkoop	6–1, 6–3
Win	35–10	Dec 2015	Nigeria F3, Lagos	Futures	Hard	(Netherlands) David Pel	(South Africa) Lloyd Harris (Egypt) Karim-Mohamed Maamoun	6–3, 6–2
Loss	35–11	Dec 2015	Nigeria F4, Lagos	Futures	Hard	(Netherlands) David Pel	(South Africa) Lloyd Harris (Egypt) Karim-Mohamed Maamoun	5–7, 6–7^{(6–8)}
Loss	35–12	Feb 2016	Israel F2, Tel Aviv	Futures	Hard	(Netherlands) Paul Monteban	(Russia) Evgeny Elistratov (Russia) Vitaly Kozyukov	1–6, 0–6
Loss	35–13	Mar 2016	France F4, Lille	Futures	Hard	(Netherlands) David Pel	(Russia) Daniil Medvedev (Russia) Denis Matsukevich	6–7^{(5–7)}, 6–4, [9–11]
Win	36–13	Mar 2016	Italy F2, Basiglio	Futures	Hard	(Netherlands) David Pel	(France) Grégoire Jacq (France) Antoine Hoang	6–4, 6–4
Loss	36–14	Apr 2016	Saint Brieuc, France	Challenger	Hard	(United States) James Cerretani	(Sweden) Andreas Siljeström (Australia) Rameez Junaid	7–5, 6–7^{(4–7)}, [8–10]
Win	37–14	Apr 2016	Le Gosier, Guadeloupe	Challenger	Hard	(United States) James Cerretani	(United States) Austin Krajicek (United States) Mitchell Krueger	6–2, 5–7, [10–8]
Win	38–14	May 2016	Nigeria F2, Abuja	Futures	Hard	(Netherlands) David Pel	(Switzerland) Luca Margaroli (Slovakia) Ilija Vucic	7–5, 3–6, [10–7]
Loss	38–15	May 2016	Nigeria F3, Abuja	Futures	Hard	(Netherlands) David Pel	(United States) Nicolas Meister (Spain) David Pérez Sanz	6–3, 6–7^{(2–7)}, [9–11]
Loss	38–16	Jan 2017	France F3, Veigy-Foncenex	Futures	Carpet	(Netherlands) Tim Van Terheijden	(Belgium) Joran Vliegen (Belgium) Julien Dubail	6–4, 4–6, [4–10]
Loss	38–17	May 2017	Italy F12, Naples	Futures	Clay	(Netherlands) Boy Westerhof	(Belgium) Joran Vliegen (Belgium) Sander Gillé	4–6, 2–6
Loss	38–18	Jan 2018	France F3, Veigy-Foncenex	Futures	Carpet	(Netherlands) Tim Van Terheijden	(France) Dan Added (France) Albano Olivetti	6–2, 6–7^{(4–7)}, [8–10]

== Junior Grand Slam finals ==
=== Singles: 1 (1 runner-up) ===
Result	Year	Tournament	Surface	Opponent	Score
Loss	2005	French Open	Clay	(Croatia) Marin Čilić	3–6, 1–6
