= Boy Westerhof =

Dutch tennis player

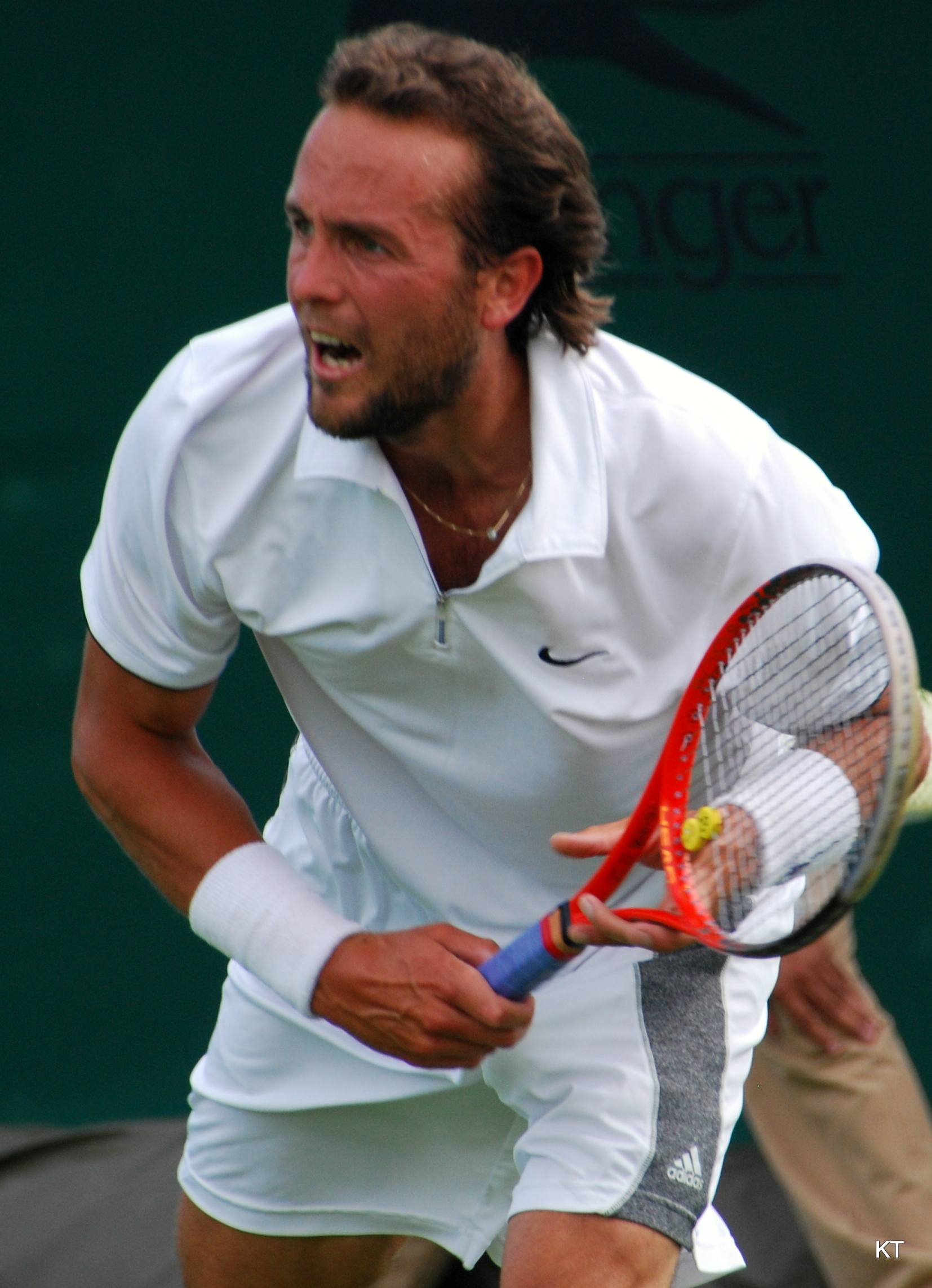
- Country (sports): Netherlands
- Residence: Amsterdam, Netherlands
- Born: 24 October 1985 (age 40) Assen, Netherlands
- Height: 1.85 m (6 ft 1 in)
- Turned pro: 2005
- Plays: Right-handed
- Prize money: US$258,186

Singles
- Career record: 0–1
- Career titles: 0
- Highest ranking: No. 201 (27 August 2012)

Grand Slam singles results
- Australian Open: Q1 (2013, 2014, 2015)
- French Open: Q1 (2013, 2015)
- Wimbledon: Q2 (2015)
- US Open: Q1 (2012, 2013)

Doubles
- Career record: 0–0
- Career titles: 0
- Highest ranking: No. 132 (8 June 2015)

Boy Westerhof (born 25 October 1985) is a Dutch professional tennis player and competes mainly on the ATP Challenger Tour and ITF Futures, both in singles and doubles.

Westerhof reached his highest ATP singles ranking No. 201 on 27 August 2012 and his highest ATP doubles ranking No. 132 on 8 June 2015.

He made his ATP World Tour main draw debut at the 2013 ATP Vegeta Croatia Open Umag as a qualifier.

== Career finals (4) ==
=== Doubles (12) ===
Legend
ATP Challengers (12)

Finals by surface
Hard (0–1)
Clay (9–2)
Grass (0–0)
Carpet (0–0)

Outcome	No.	Date	Tournament	Surface	Partnering	Opponents in the final	Score
Winners	1.	5 August 2007	Saransk, Russia	Clay	(Netherlands) Antal van der Duim	(Kazakhstan) Alexey Kedryuk (Italy) Uros Vico	2–6, 7–6^{3}, [11–9]
Winners	2.	26 August 2007	Manerbio, Italy	Clay	(Netherlands) Antal van der Duim	(Portugal) Frederico Gil (Spain) Alberto Martin	7–6^{4}, 3–6, [10–8]
Runner-up	3.	20 July 2008	Oberstaufen, Germany	Clay	(Brazil) André Ghem	(Czech Republic) Dušan Karol (Czech Republic) Jaroslav Pospíšil	7–6^{(3–7)}, 1–6, [6–10]
Runner-up	4.	26 July 2008	Penza, Russia	Hard	(Brazil) André Ghem	(Uzbekistan) Denis Istomin (Russia) Evgeny Kirillov	2–6, 6–3, [6–10]
Winners	5.	15 July 2012	Scheveningen, Netherlands	Clay	(Netherlands) Antal van der Duim	(Australia) Rameez Junaid (Germany) Simon Stadler	6–4, 5–7, [10–7]
Winners	6.	14 July 2013	Scheveningen, Netherlands	Clay	(Netherlands) Antal van der Duim	(Germany) Gero Kretschmer (Germany) Alexander Satschko	6–3, 6–3
Winners	7.	8 September 2013	Alphen, Netherlands	Clay	(Netherlands) Antal van der Duim	(Germany) Simon Greul (Netherlands) Wesley Koolhof	4–6, 6–3, [12–10]
Winners	8.	13 July 2014	Scheveningen, Netherlands	Clay	(Netherlands) Matwé Middelkoop	(Austria) Martin Fischer (Netherlands) Jesse Huta Galung	6–4, 3–6, [10–6]
Winners	9.	7 September 2014	Alphen, Netherlands	Clay	(Netherlands) Antal van der Duim	(Spain) Rubén Ramírez Hidalgo (Italy) Matteo Viola	6–1, 6–3
Winners	10.	13 September 2014	Seville, Spain	Clay	(Netherlands) Antal van der Duim	(Republic of Ireland) James Cluskey (Netherlands) Jesse Huta Galung	7–6^{(7–3)}, 6–4
Runner-up	11.	11 September 2016	Alphen, Netherlands	Clay	(Netherlands) Robin Haase	(Germany) Daniel Masur (Germany) Jan-Lennard Struff	4–6, 1–6
Winners	12.	10 September 2017	Alphen, Netherlands	Clay	(Netherlands) Botic van de Zandschulp	(Bulgaria) Alexandar Lazov (Ukraine) Volodymyr Uzhylovskyi	7–6^{(8–6)}, 7–5
