= TEAN International =

Defunct tennis tournament
- Tour: ATP Challenger Tour; ITF Women's Circuit
- Abolished: 2017
- Location: Alphen aan den Rijn, Netherlands
- Venue: Alphense Tennis Club
- Surface: Clay
- Prize money: €42,500 (men) $10,000 (women)
- Website: teaninternational.nl

The TEAN International was a professional tennis tournament played on outdoor clay courts. It was part of the Association of Tennis Professionals (ATP) Challenger Tour and the ITF Women's Circuit, held annually at the Alphense Tennis Club in Alphen aan den Rijn, Netherlands from 1996 until 2017.

== Past finals ==
=== Men's singles ===
Year	Champion	Runner-up	Score
2017	(Estonia) Jürgen Zopp	(Spain) Tommy Robredo	6–3, 6–2
2016	(Germany) Jan-Lennard Struff	(Netherlands) Robin Haase	6–4, 6–1
2015	(Bosnia and Herzegovina) Damir Džumhur	(Netherlands) Igor Sijsling	6–1, 2–6, 6–1
2014	(Netherlands) Jesse Huta Galung	(Spain) Daniel Muñoz de la Nava	6–3, 6–4
2013	(Spain) Daniel Gimeno-Traver	(Netherlands) Thomas Schoorel	6–2, 6–4
2012	(Netherlands) Thiemo de Bakker	(Germany) Simon Greul	6–4, 6–2
2011	(Netherlands) Igor Sijsling	(Germany) Jan-Lennard Struff	7–6^{(7–2)}, 6–3
2010	(Netherlands) Jesse Huta Galung	(Netherlands) Thomas Schoorel	6–7^{(4–7)}, 6–4, 6–4
2009	(France) Stéphane Robert	(United States) Michael Russell	7–6^{(7–2)}, 5–7, 7–6^{(7–5)}
2008	(Germany) Simon Greul	(Spain) Iván Navarro	6–4, 6–3
2007	(Netherlands) Jesse Huta Galung	(France) Augustin Gensse	6–4, 6–7^{(9–11)}, 7–6^{(7–4)}
2006	(Germany) Gero Kretschmer	(Netherlands) Nick van der Meer	7–5, 5–7, 6–2
2005	(Netherlands) Jesse Huta Galung	(Austria) Max Raditschnigg	7–6^{(7–2)}, 7–6^{(7–4)}
2004	(Germany) Andreas Beck	(Belgium) Stefan Wauters	7–6^{(7–1)}, 6–2
2003	(Germany) Denis Gremelmayr	(Sweden) Robert Lindstedt	6–3, 3–6, 6–3
2002	(Spain) Óscar Hernández	(France) Florent Serra	6–4, 6–3
2001	(Germany) Jan Weinzierl	(Japan) Jun Kato	6–3, 6–4
2000	(Netherlands) Dennis van Scheppingen	(Netherlands) Marc Merry	6–3, 6–1
1999	(Netherlands) Martijn Belgraver	(Netherlands) Yannik Reuter	7–6, 6–1
1998	(Netherlands) Martijn Bok	(Netherlands) Eddy Bank	7–6^{(10–8)}, 6–4
1997	(Netherlands) Yannik Reuter	(Netherlands) Huib Troost	6–4, 6–2
1996	(Netherlands) Wouter Standaart	(Netherlands) Mark Paul Burgersdijk	6–2, 5–7, 6–4

=== Men's doubles ===
Year	Champions	Runners-up	Score
2017	(Netherlands) Botic van de Zandschulp (Netherlands) Boy Westerhof	(Bulgaria) Alexandar Lazov (Ukraine) Volodymyr Uzhylovskyi	7–6^{(8–6)}, 7–5
2016	(Germany) Daniel Masur (Germany) Jan-Lennard Struff	(Netherlands) Robin Haase (Netherlands) Boy Westerhof	6–4, 6–1
2015	(Germany) Tobias Kamke (Germany) Jan-Lennard Struff	(Romania) Victor Hănescu (Romania) Adrian Ungur	7–6^{(7–1)}, 4–6, [10–7]
2014	(Netherlands) Antal van der Duim (Netherlands) Boy Westerhof	(Spain) Rubén Ramírez Hidalgo (Italy) Matteo Viola	6–1, 6–3
2013	(Netherlands) Antal van der Duim (Netherlands) Boy Westerhof	(Germany) Simon Greul (Netherlands) Wesley Koolhof	4–6, 6–3, [12–10]
2012	(Australia) Rameez Junaid (Germany) Simon Stadler	(Germany) Simon Greul (Germany) Bastian Knittel	4–6, 6–1, [10–5]
2011	(Netherlands) Thiemo de Bakker (Netherlands) Antal van der Duim	(Netherlands) Matwé Middelkoop (Netherlands) Igor Sijsling	6–4, 6–7^{(4–7)}, [10–6]
2010	(Uzbekistan) Farrukh Dustov (Austria) Bertram Steinberger	(Netherlands) Roy Bruggeling (Netherlands) Bas van der Valk	6–4, 6–1
2009	(United Kingdom) Jonathan Marray (United Kingdom) Jamie Murray	(Ukraine) Sergei Bubka (Ukraine) Sergiy Stakhovsky	6–1, 6–4
2008	(Australia) Rameez Junaid (Germany) Philipp Marx	(Netherlands) Bart Beks (Netherlands) Matwé Middelkoop	6–3, 6–2
2007	(Italy) Leonardo Azzaro (Croatia) Lovro Zovko	(France) Jérémy Chardy (North Macedonia) Predrag Rusevski	6–3, 6–3
2006	(Austria) Daniel Köllerer (Serbia and Montenegro) Petar Popović	(Netherlands) Michel Koning (Netherlands) Nick van der Meer	6–2, 6–3
2005	(Argentina) Diego Álvarez (Estonia) Mait Künnap	(Italy) Alessandro Motti (Netherlands) Jasper Smit	4–6, 6–4, 6–2
2004	(Brazil) Francisco Costa (Belgium) Jeroen Masson	(Jamaica) Dustin Brown (Netherlands) Eric Kuijlen	6–1, 7–6(3)
2003	(Sweden) Robert Lindstedt (Germany) Lars Uebel	(Venezuela) Jhonnatan Medina-Álvarez (Argentina) Nicolás Todero	walkover
2002	(Spain) Óscar Hernández (Argentina) Gustavo Marcaccio	(Netherlands) Melvyn op der Heijde (Netherlands) Melle Van Gemerden	6–2, 6–3
2001	(Netherlands) Ronald od Heijde (Russia) Jan Weinzierl	(Azerbaijan) Emin Ağayev (United States) James Blake	6–3, 6–4
2000	(Netherlands) Dennis van Scheppingen (Netherlands) Marc Merry	(Argentina) Leonardo Olguín (Argentina) Marcelo Wowk	6–4, 7–5
1999	(Netherlands) Erik Brummer (Netherlands) Melvyn op der Heijde	(Netherlands) Mark Paul Burgersdijk (Netherlands) Yannick Reuter	6–4, 6–3
1998	(Netherlands) Martin Verkerk (Netherlands) Melvyn op der Heijde	(Netherlands) Robin Verbeet (Netherlands) Mark Paul Burgersdijk	2–6, 6–4, 6–4
1997	(Netherlands) Schol (Netherlands) Huib Troost	(Netherlands) Robin Verbeet (Netherlands) Mark Paul Burgersdijk	7–6, 7–5
1996	(Netherlands) Bart Beks (Netherlands) Christoffel Van Hees	(Netherlands) Mark Paul Burgersdijk (Netherlands) Wouter Standaart	6–3, 4–6, 6–4

=== Women's singles ===
Year	Champion	Runner-up	Score
2016	(Netherlands) Chayenne Ewijk	(Netherlands) Suzan Lamens	7–5, 7–5
2015	(Belgium) Marie Benoît	(Croatia) Tena Lukas	5–7, 6–3, 6–4
2014	(Czech Republic) Denisa Allertová	(Brazil) Teliana Pereira	6–3, ret.
2013	(Netherlands) Arantxa Rus	(Germany) Carina Witthöft	4–6, 6–2, 6–2
2012	(Czech Republic) Sandra Záhlavová	(Netherlands) Lesley Kerkhove	7–5, 7–6^{(7–5)}
2011	(Liechtenstein) Stephanie Vogt	(Poland) Katarzyna Piter	6–2, 6–4
2010	(Germany) Julia Schruff	(France) Irena Pavlovic	6–0, 6–3
2009	(Belarus) Iryna Kuryanovich	(Sweden) Johanna Larsson	6–3, 6–3
2008	(Germany) Stephanie Gehrlein	(Argentina) Florencia Molinero	7–6^{(7–3)}, 6–0
2007	(Netherlands) Arantxa Rus	(Netherlands) Renée Reinhard	4–6, 7–5, 7–6^{(7–2)}
2006	(New Zealand) Marina Erakovic	(Germany) Andrea Petkovic	4–6, 6–2, 7–5
2005	(Germany) Andrea Petkovic	(Netherlands) Eva Pera	7–5, 7–5
2004	(Netherlands) Tessy van de Ven	(Switzerland) Gaëlle Widmer	6–3, 6–3
2003	(Netherlands) Tessy van de Ven	(Bosnia and Herzegovina) Sandra Martinović	6–3, 7–5
2002	(Belgium) Leslie Butkiewicz	(Bulgaria) Dimana Krastevitch	6–3, 6–3
2001	(Netherlands) Anouk Sterk	(Germany) Camilla Kremer	6–3, 7–6^{(7–5)}

=== Women's doubles ===
Year	Champions	Runners-up	Score
2016	(Netherlands) Nina Kruijer (Netherlands) Suzan Lamens	(Netherlands) Chayenne Ewijk (Netherlands) Rosalie van der Hoek	6–0, 3–6, [10–5]
2015	(Netherlands) Quirine Lemoine (Netherlands) Eva Wacanno	(Netherlands) Lesley Kerkhove (Netherlands) Arantxa Rus	3–6, 6–4, [10–7]
2014	(Sweden) Rebecca Peterson (Netherlands) Eva Wacanno	(Netherlands) Richèl Hogenkamp (Netherlands) Lesley Kerkhove	6–4, 6–4
2013	(Netherlands) Cindy Burger (Chile) Daniela Seguel	(Netherlands) Demi Schuurs (Netherlands) Eva Wacanno	6–4, 6–1
2012	(Romania) Diana Buzean (Netherlands) Daniëlle Harmsen	(Italy) Corinna Dentoni (Germany) Justine Ozga	6–2, 6–0
2011	(Romania) Diana Enache (Netherlands) Daniëlle Harmsen	(Poland) Katarzyna Piter (Poland) Barbara Sobaszkiewicz	6–2, 6–7^{(4–7)}, [11–9]
2010	(Netherlands) Daniëlle Harmsen (Netherlands) Bibiane Schoofs	(Russia) Ksenia Lykina (France) Irena Pavlovic	6–3, 6–2
2009	(Ukraine) Lyudmyla Kichenok (Ukraine) Nadiya Kichenok	(Netherlands) Chayenne Ewijk (Netherlands) Marlot Meddens	6–2, 4–6, [10–8]
2008	(Argentina) Florencia Molinero (Ukraine) Lesya Tsurenko	(Croatia) Darija Jurak (Serbia) Vojislava Lukić	4–6, 7–5, [10–7]
2007	(Netherlands) Daniëlle Harmsen (Netherlands) Renée Reinhard	(South Africa) Kelly Anderson (United States) Kady Pooler	6–2, 6–4
2006	(Slovenia) Andreja Klepač (Serbia and Montenegro) Danica Krstajić	(Belgium) Leslie Butkiewicz (Belgium) Caroline Maes	6–2, 7–6^{(7–1)}
2005	(Netherlands) Mireille Bink (Netherlands) Susanne Trik	(Czech Republic) Veronika Raimrová (Sweden) Aleksandra Srndovic	6–2, 3–6, 6–2
2004	(Belgium) Leslie Butkiewicz (Belgium) Eveline Vanhyfte	(Austria) Daniela Klemenschits (Austria) Sandra Klemenschits	7–5, 6–3
2003	(Netherlands) Tessy van de Ven (Netherlands) Suzanne van Hartingsveldt	(Netherlands) Jolanda Mens (Netherlands) Anouk Sterk	6–2, 6–2
2002	(Socialist Federal Republic of Yugoslavia) Milica Koprivica (Socialist Federal Republic of Yugoslavia) Dina Milošević	(Netherlands) Inge de Geest (Netherlands) Suzanne van Hartingsveldt	6–3, 6–7^{(1–7)}, 6–1
2001	(Russia) Maria Kondratieva (Russia) Ilona Vichnevskaya	(Netherlands) Anouk Sterk (Netherlands) Susanne Trik	3–6, 6–2, 6–1
