= 2015 Sport 1 Open – Doubles =

Doubles
- 2015 Sport 1 Open

Final
- Champions: (Uruguay) Ariel Behar (Brazil) Eduardo Dischinger
- Runners-up: (Russia) Aslan Karatsev (Russia) Andrey Kuznetsov
- Score: 0–0, retired

Events
Singles	Doubles
← 2014 ·	Sport 1 Open	· 2016 →

Matwé Middelkoop and Boy Westerhof are the defending champions, but chose not to participate this year.

Ariel Behar and Eduardo Dischinger won the title defeating, after Aslan Karatsev and Andrey Kuznetsov retired in the final.

== Seeds ==
1. (Peru) Sergio Galdós / (Brazil) Fabrício Neis (quarterfinals)
2. (Australia) Adam Hubble / (France) Alexandre Sidorenko (semifinals)
3. (Russia) Aslan Karatsev / (Russia) Andrey Kuznetsov (final, retired)
4. (Netherlands) Sander Arends / (Netherlands) Niels Lootsma (semifinals)

== Draw ==
=== Key ===
- Q = Qualifier
- WC = Wild card
- LL = Lucky loser
- Alt = Alternate
- SE = Special exempt
- PR = Protected ranking
- ITF = ITF entry
- JE = Junior exempt
- w/o = Walkover
- r = Retired
- d = Defaulted
- SR = Special ranking

First round
(Netherlands) S Fransen (Germany) P Torebko
(Uruguay) A Behar (Brazil) E Dischinger	w/o
4	(Netherlands) S Arends (Netherlands) N Lootsma	7^{7}	6
WC	(Netherlands) Roy de Valk (Netherlands) S Griekspoor	6^{5}	4
WC	(Netherlands) J Timmermans (Netherlands) Tim van Terheijden	3	2
(Slovakia) J Kovalík (Czech Republic) J Mertl	6	6
(Netherlands) S Groen (United States) G Ouellette	3	6	[7]
(Georgia (country)) N Basilashvili (Netherlands) Romano Frantzen	6	3	[10]
(Ukraine) Sergiy Sergiienko (Ukraine) A Smirnov	5	3
WC	(Netherlands) J Huta Galung (Netherlands) Robert Willekes MacDonald	7	6

Quarterfinals
1	(Peru) S Galdós (Brazil) F Neis	6	3	[9]
(Uruguay) A Behar (Brazil) E Dischinger	4	6	[11]
4	(Netherlands) S Arends (Netherlands) N Lootsma	6^{2}	6	[13]
(Slovakia) J Kovalík (Czech Republic) J Mertl	7^{7}	4	[11]
(Georgia (country)) N Basilashvili (Netherlands) R Frantzen	3	6	[7]
3	(Russia) A Karatsev (Russia) A Kuznetsov	6	3	[10]
WC	(Netherlands) J Huta Galung (Netherlands) RW MacDonald	3	4
2	(Australia) A Hubble (France) A Sidorenko	6	6

Semifinals
(Uruguay) A Behar (Brazil) E Dischinger	6	7
4	(Netherlands) S Arends (Netherlands) N Lootsma	3	5
3	(Russia) A Karatsev (Russia) A Kuznetsov	6	6
2	(Australia) A Hubble (France) A Sidorenko	4	3

Final
(Uruguay) A Behar (Brazil) E Dischinger	0
3	(Russia) A Karatsev (Russia) A Kuznetsov	0^{r}
