= 2017 The Hague Open – Doubles =

Doubles
- 2017 The Hague Open

Final
- Champions: (Belgium) Sander Gillé (Belgium) Joran Vliegen
- Runners-up: (Slovakia) Jozef Kovalík (Greece) Stefanos Tsitsipas
- Score: 6–2, 4–6, [12–10]

Events
Singles	Doubles
← 2016 ·	The Hague Open	· 2018 →

Wesley Koolhof and Matwé Middelkoop were the defending champions but chose not to defend their title.

Sander Gillé and Joran Vliegen won the title after defeating Jozef Kovalík and Stefanos Tsitsipas 6–2, 4–6, [12–10] in the final.

== Seeds ==
1. (Germany) Kevin Krawietz / (Germany) Gero Kretschmer (first round)
2. (Belgium) Sander Gillé / (Belgium) Joran Vliegen (champions)
3. (Spain) Íñigo Cervantes / (Brazil) Fabiano de Paula (semifinals)
4. (Netherlands) Tallon Griekspoor / (Netherlands) David Pel (quarterfinals)

== Draw ==
=== Key ===
- Q = Qualifier
- WC = Wild card
- LL = Lucky loser
- Alt = Alternate
- SE = Special exempt
- PR = Protected ranking
- ITF = ITF entry
- JE = Junior exempt
- w/o = Walkover
- r = Retired
- d = Defaulted
- SR = Special ranking

First round
1	(Germany) K Krawietz (Germany) G Kretschmer	6	3	[11]
(Slovakia) J Kovalík (Greece) S Tsitsipas	1	6	[13]
(Portugal) J Domingues (Argentina) JI Londero	2	6	[8]
(Japan) T Daniel (Ukraine) S Stakhovsky	6	4	[10]
4	(Netherlands) T Griekspoor (Netherlands) D Pel	3	6	[10]
(Belgium) Y Mertens (France) G Sakharov	6	4	[8]
(Australia) M Banes (Belgium) Clément Geens	4	0
(Belgium) R Bemelmans (Belgium) J De Loore	6	6
(Bosnia and Herzegovina) M Bašić (Serbia) F Krajinović	6	7^{7}
WC	(Switzerland) M-A Hüsler (Netherlands) S Verbeek	4	6^{5}
(Turkey) T Altuna (Serbia) M Tepavac	0	3
3	(Spain) Í Cervantes (Brazil) F de Paula	6	6
WC	(Germany) P Torebko (Germany) George von Massow	4	6	[6]
(Brazil) E Dischinger (Argentina) M González	6	2	[10]
WC	(Netherlands) Michiel de Krom (Netherlands) Roy de Valk	0	3
2	(Belgium) S Gillé (Belgium) J Vliegen	6	6

Quarterfinals
(Slovakia) J Kovalík (Greece) S Tsitsipas	7	7
(Japan) T Daniel (Ukraine) S Stakhovsky	5	5
4	(Netherlands) T Griekspoor (Netherlands) D Pel	4	3
(Belgium) R Bemelmans (Belgium) J De Loore	6	6
(Bosnia and Herzegovina) M Bašić (Serbia) F Krajinović	7	4	[16]
3	(Spain) Í Cervantes (Brazil) F de Paula	5	6	[18]
(Brazil) E Dischinger (Argentina) M González	3	3
2	(Belgium) S Gillé (Belgium) J Vliegen	6	6

Semifinals
(Slovakia) J Kovalík (Greece) S Tsitsipas	w/o
(Belgium) R Bemelmans (Belgium) J De Loore
3	(Spain) Í Cervantes (Brazil) F de Paula	3	5
2	(Belgium) S Gillé (Belgium) J Vliegen	6	7

Final
(Slovakia) J Kovalík (Greece) S Tsitsipas	2	6	[10]
2	(Belgium) S Gillé (Belgium) J Vliegen	6	4	[12]
