= 2012 The Hague Open – Singles =

Singles
- 2012 The Hague Open

Final
- Champion: (Poland) Jerzy Janowicz
- Runner-up: (Netherlands) Matwé Middelkoop
- Score: 6–2, 6–2

Events
Singles	Doubles
← 2011 ·	The Hague Open	· 2013 →

Steve Darcis was the defending champion but decided not to participate in The Hague Open - Singles.
Jerzy Janowicz won the title, defeating Matwé Middelkoop 6–2, 6–2 in the final.

== Seeds ==
1. (Poland) Jerzy Janowicz (champion)
2. (Russia) Teymuraz Gabashvili (first round)
3. (France) Augustin Gensse (first round)
4. (Spain) Iñigo Cervantes Huegun (quarterfinals)
5. (Argentina) Martín Alund (second round)
6. (France) Kenny de Schepper (second round)
7. (Argentina) Máximo González (first round)
8. (Czech Republic) Jan Mertl (second round)

== Draw ==
=== Key ===
- Q = Qualifier
- WC = Wild card
- LL = Lucky loser
- Alt = Alternate
- SE = Special exempt
- PR = Protected ranking
- ITF = ITF entry
- JE = Junior exempt
- w/o = Walkover
- r = Retired
- d = Defaulted
- SR = Special ranking

=== Finals ===
Semifinals
1	(Poland) Jerzy Janowicz	6	6
(Germany) Peter Torebko	2	2
WC	(Netherlands) Matwé Middelkoop	3	6	6
(Argentina) Diego Junqueira	6	3	2

Final
1	(Poland) Jerzy Janowicz	6	6
WC	(Netherlands) Matwé Middelkoop	2	2

=== Top half ===
First round
1	(Poland) J Janowicz	4	6	6
(Netherlands) J Huta Galung	6	3	3
(France) Laurent Rochette	3	4
(Netherlands) B Westerhof	6	6
(Belgium) Y Mertens	6	6
(Germany) D Meffert	2	2
(France) V Millot	3	3
8	(Czech Republic) J Mertl	6	6
4	(Spain) I Cervantes Huegun	5	7	6
(France) N Devilder	7	5	3
WC	(Netherlands) Mark de Jong	4	2
WC	(Belgium) K Coppejans	6	6
(Russia) K Kravchuk	4	5
(Germany) P Torebko	6	7
(France) S Robert	7^{7}	6
7	(Argentina) M González	6^{5}	3

Second round
1	(Poland) J Janowicz	6	6
(Netherlands) B Westerhof	4	3
(Belgium) Y Mertens	6	6^{5}	6
8	(Czech Republic) J Mertl	3	7^{7}	1
4	(Spain) I Cervantes Huegun	6	6
WC	(Belgium) K Coppejans	1	4
(Germany) P Torebko	6	4	6
(France) S Robert	4	6	2

Quarterfinals
1	(Poland) J Janowicz	6	7^{7}
(Belgium) Y Mertens	2	6^{4}
4	(Spain) I Cervantes Huegun	3	6	6^{7}
(Germany) P Torebko	6	4	7^{9}

Semifinals
1	(Poland) J Janowicz	6	6
(Germany) P Torebko	2	2

=== Bottom half ===
First round
6	(France) K de Schepper	6	6^{4}	6
Q	(France) A Sidorenko	3	7^{7}	1
(Hungary) A Balázs	6	2	3
WC	(Netherlands) T de Bakker	4	6	6
(Austria) P Oswald	2	6^{4}
(Netherlands) T Schoorel	6	7^{7}
WC	(Netherlands) M Middelkoop	6	7
3	(France) A Gensse	0	5
5	(Argentina) M Alund	6	2	7^{7}
Q	(Brazil) T Monteiro	2	6	6^{5}
(Argentina) D Junqueira	6	6
(Moldova) R Albot	2	4
Q	(Kazakhstan) Y Schukin	6	7^{7}
Q	(Australia) R Junaid	2	6^{3}
(Finland) T Nieminen	6	6
2	(Russia) T Gabashvili	4	1

Second round
6	(France) K de Schepper	2	4
WC	(Netherlands) T de Bakker	6	6
(Netherlands) T Schoorel	4	6^{5}
WC	(Netherlands) M Middelkoop	6	7^{7}
5	(Argentina) M Alund	3	3
(Argentina) D Junqueira	6	6
Q	(Kazakhstan) Y Schukin	6	6	6
(Finland) T Nieminen	7	1	3

Quarterfinals
WC	(Netherlands) T de Bakker	4	4
WC	(Netherlands) M Middelkoop	6	6
(Argentina) D Junqueira	7^{7}	2
Q	(Kazakhstan) Y Schukin	6^{2}	1^{r}

Semifinals
WC	(Netherlands) M Middelkoop	3	6	6
(Argentina) D Junqueira	6	3	2
