= 2016 The Hague Open – Singles =

Singles
- 2016 The Hague Open

Final
- Champion: (Netherlands) Robin Haase
- Runner-up: (Czech Republic) Adam Pavlásek
- Score: 6–4, 6–7^{(9–11)}, 6–2

Events
Singles	Doubles
← 2015 ·	The Hague Open	· 2017 →

Nikoloz Basilashvili was the defending champion but chose not to defend his title.

Robin Haase won the title after defeating Adam Pavlásek 6–4, 6–7^{(9–11)}, 6–2 in the final.

== Seeds ==
1. (Portugal) Gastão Elias (withdrew)
2. (Spain) Íñigo Cervantes (second round)
3. (Argentina) Facundo Bagnis (second round)
4. (Netherlands) Robin Haase (champion)
5. (Argentina) Renzo Olivo (first round)
6. (Netherlands) Igor Sijsling (first round)
7. (Czech Republic) Adam Pavlásek (final)
8. (Spain) Daniel Muñoz de la Nava (first round)
9. (France) Constant Lestienne (semifinals)

== Draw ==
=== Key ===
- Q = Qualifier
- WC = Wild card
- LL = Lucky loser
- Alt = Alternate
- SE = Special exempt
- PR = Protected ranking
- ITF = ITF entry
- JE = Junior exempt
- w/o = Walkover
- r = Retired
- d = Defaulted
- SR = Special ranking

=== Finals ===
Semifinals
9	(France) Constant Lestienne	3	3
4	(Netherlands) Robin Haase	6	6
7	(Czech Republic) Adam Pavlásek	7^{8}	6
(Belgium) Yannik Reuter	6^{6}	4

Final
4	(Netherlands) Robin Haase	6	6^{9}	6
7	(Czech Republic) Adam Pavlásek	4	7^{11}	2

=== Top half ===
First round
9	(France) C Lestienne	3	6	6
(Czech Republic) Robin Staněk	6	4	0
(Argentina) A Velotti	3	4
WC	(Netherlands) J Huta Galung	6	6
(Austria) B Trinker	7	3	1
PR	(Netherlands) B Westerhof	5	6	6
(Serbia) P Krstin	7	6
8	(Spain) D Muñoz de la Nava	5	3
4	(Netherlands) R Haase	7	6
(Spain) P Riba	5	4
WC	(Greece) S Tsitsipas	7^{7}	7^{7}
LL	(Austria) Gibril Diarra	6^{4}	6^{2}
(Poland) K Majchrzak	6	7
(Netherlands) S Griekspoor	2	5
(Russia) A Vatutin	7	2	6
5	(Argentina) R Olivo	5	6	0

Second round
9	(France) C Lestienne	6	6
WC	(Netherlands) J Huta Galung	2	1
PR	(Netherlands) B Westerhof	6	6
(Serbia) P Krstin	3	4
4	(Netherlands) R Haase	6	1	6
WC	(Greece) S Tsitsipas	4	6	1
(Poland) K Majchrzak	7	6^{5}	1
(Russia) A Vatutin	5	7^{7}	6

Quarterfinals
9	(France) C Lestienne	6	6
PR	(Netherlands) B Westerhof	4	3
4	(Netherlands) R Haase	6	6
(Russia) A Vatutin	1	1

Semifinals
9	(France) C Lestienne	3	3
4	(Netherlands) R Haase	6	6

=== Bottom half ===
First round
7	(Czech Republic) A Pavlásek	6	3	6
Q	(Argentina) Juan Ignacio Galarza	3	6	3
Q	(Germany) George von Massow	6	2	5
Q	(Germany) P Torebko	2	6	7
WC	(Netherlands) T Griekspoor	3	6	6
(Ecuador) G Lapentti	6	2	2
(Netherlands) A van der Duim	2	3
3	(Argentina) F Bagnis	6	6
6	(Netherlands) I Sijsling	6	1	4
(France) G Sakharov	2	6	6
(Ukraine) A Smirnov	2	1
(Portugal) P Sousa	6	6
(Belgium) Y Reuter	7^{7}	7
Q	(France) A Hoang	6^{3}	5
WC	(Netherlands) T van Rijthoven	6	3	4
2	(Spain) Í Cervantes	2	6	6

Second round
7	(Czech Republic) A Pavlásek	6	6
Q	(Germany) P Torebko	3	2
WC	(Netherlands) T Griekspoor	7^{7}	6
3	(Argentina) F Bagnis	6^{4}	4
(France) G Sakharov	6	4	4
(Portugal) P Sousa	2	6	6
(Belgium) Y Reuter	7^{7}	7^{7}
2	(Spain) Í Cervantes	6^{4}	6^{4}

Quarterfinals
7	(Czech Republic) A Pavlásek	4	7	6
WC	(Netherlands) T Griekspoor	6	5	3
(Portugal) P Sousa	6	4	4
(Belgium) Y Reuter	2	6	6

Semifinals
7	(Czech Republic) A Pavlásek	7^{8}	6
(Belgium) Y Reuter	6^{6}	4
