= 2013 Sport 1 Open – Doubles =

Doubles
- 2013 Sport 1 Open

Final
- Champions: (Netherlands) Antal van der Duim (Netherlands) Boy Westerhof
- Runners-up: (Germany) Gero Kretschmer (Germany) Alexander Satschko
- Score: 6–3, 6–3

Events
Singles	Doubles
- Sport 1 Open

Antal van der Duim and Boy Westerhof were the defending champions and defended their title against Gero Kretschmer and Alexander Satschko 6–3, 6–3.

== Seeds ==
1. (Netherlands) Stephan Fransen / (Netherlands) Robin Haase (first round)
2. (Croatia) Franko Škugor / (Serbia) Goran Tošić (first round)
3. (Austria) Martin Fischer / (Germany) Dominik Meffert (first round)
4. (Moldova) Radu Albot / (Ukraine) Oleksandr Nedovyesov (semifinals)

== Draw ==
Key

- Q = Qualifier
- WC = Wild card
- LL = Lucky loser
- Alt = Alternate
- ITF = ITF entry
- PR = Protected ranking
- SR = Special ranking
- SE = Special exempt
- JE = Junior exempt
- JR = Junior Accelerator Programme entrant
- CO = College Accelerator Programme entrant
- NG = Next Gen Accelerator Program entrant
- w/o = Walkover
- r = Retired
- d = Defaulted

First round
1	(Netherlands) S Fransen (Netherlands) R Haase	3	1
WC	(Netherlands) Romano Frantzen (Netherlands) T Schoorel	6	6
(Netherlands) A van der Duim (Netherlands) B Westerhof	7^{7}	6
(Brazil) A Ghem (Netherlands) S Groen	6^{1}	4
4	(Moldova) R Albot (Ukraine) O Nedovyesov	6	6
(Italy) L Giustino (Spain) Jordi Marsé-Vidri	1	3
(Serbia) D Lojda (Ukraine) I Sergeyev	6	6
(Brazil) L Kirche (Brazil) T Monteiro	4	2
(Australia) C Ebelthite (United Kingdom) D Walsh	3	2
(Philippines) R Gonzales (Australia) Chris Letcher	6	6
(Netherlands) J Huta Galung (Netherlands) M Middelkoop	7^{7}	7^{7}
3	(Austria) M Fischer (Germany) D Meffert	6^{5}	6^{5}
WC	(Netherlands) Paul Moggre (Netherlands) Nick van der Meer	6	6
WC	(Netherlands) Roy de Valk (Netherlands) Cedric Willems	3	0
(Germany) G Kretschmer (Germany) A Satschko	7^{7}	7
2	(Croatia) F Škugor (Serbia) G Tošić	6^{1}	5

Quarterfinals
WC	(Netherlands) R Frantzen (Netherlands) T Schoorel	0	6^{6}
(Netherlands) A van der Duim (Netherlands) B Westerhof	6	7^{8}
4	(Moldova) R Albot (Ukraine) O Nedovyesov	6	6
(Serbia) D Lojda (Ukraine) I Sergeyev	0	4
(Philippines) R Gonzales (Australia) C Letcher	3	6	[10]
(Netherlands) J Huta Galung (Netherlands) M Middelkoop	6	4	[8]
WC	(Netherlands) P Moggre (Netherlands) N van der Meer	1	4
(Germany) G Kretschmer (Germany) A Satschko	6	6

Semifinals
(Netherlands) A van der Duim (Netherlands) B Westerhof	6	6
(Moldova) R Albot (Ukraine) O Nedovyesov	3	3
(Philippines) R Gonzales (Australia) C Letcher	2	4
(Germany) G Kretschmer (Germany) A Satschko	6	6

Final
(Netherlands) A van der Duim (Netherlands) B Westerhof	6	6
(Germany) G Kretschmer (Germany) A Satschko	3	3
