= 2016 The Hague Open – Doubles =

Doubles
- 2016 The Hague Open

Final
- Champions: (Netherlands) Wesley Koolhof (Netherlands) Matwé Middelkoop
- Runners-up: (Netherlands) Tallon Griekspoor (Netherlands) Tim van Rijthoven
- Score: 6–1, 3–6, [13–11]

Events
Singles	Doubles
← 2015 ·	The Hague Open	· 2017 →

Ariel Behar and Eduardo Dischinger were the defending champions, but Dischinger decided not to defend his title so Behar partnered Dino Marcan instead. Behar lost in the quarterfinals to Tallon Griekspoor and Tim van Rijthoven.

Wesley Koolhof and Matwé Middelkoop won the title after defeating Tallon Griekspoor and Tim van Rijthoven 6–1, 3–6, [13–11] in the final.

== Seeds ==
1. (Netherlands) Wesley Koolhof / (Netherlands) Matwé Middelkoop (champions)
2. (Uruguay) Ariel Behar / (Croatia) Dino Marcan (quarterfinals)
3. (Spain) Íñigo Cervantes / (Netherlands) Mark Vervoort (semifinals)
4. (Netherlands) Sander Arends / (Poland) Adam Majchrowicz (first round)

== Draw ==
=== Key ===
- Q = Qualifier
- WC = Wild card
- LL = Lucky loser
- Alt = Alternate
- SE = Special exempt
- PR = Protected ranking
- ITF = ITF entry
- JE = Junior exempt
- w/o = Walkover
- r = Retired
- d = Defaulted
- SR = Special ranking

First round
1	(Netherlands) W Koolhof (Netherlands) M Middelkoop	6	6
(Poland) K Majchrzak (Netherlands) D Pel	0	3
(Romania) C-I Gârd (Philippines) R Gonzales	6	7
(France) A Hoang (Russia) A Vatutin	3	5
4	(Netherlands) S Arends (Poland) A Majchrowicz	0	1
WC	(Netherlands) Roy De Valk (Netherlands) R Haase	6	6
(Netherlands) Bobbie De Goeijen (Austria) Gibril Diarra	4	6	[10]
(Germany) Tom Schonenberg (Germany) P Torebko	6	2	[6]
(Argentina) JP Ficovich (Argentina) Juan Ignacio Galarza	2	7	[6]
(Serbia) P Krstin (Argentina) A Velotti	6	5	[10]
WC	(Netherlands) J Sels (Netherlands) Robert Willekes Macdonald	2	2
3	(Spain) Í Cervantes (Netherlands) M Vervoort	6	6
WC	(Netherlands) T Griekspoor (Netherlands) T van Rijthoven	3	6	[10]
(India) S Balaji (India) VS Prashanth	6	2	[8]
(Australia) S de Waard (Germany) A Mies	3	3
2	(Uruguay) A Behar (Croatia) D Marcan	6	6

Quarterfinals
1	(Netherlands) W Koolhof (Netherlands) M Middelkoop	6	6
(Romania) C-I Gârd (Philippines) R Gonzales	1	1
WC	(Netherlands) R De Valk (Netherlands) R Haase	6	3	[10]
(Netherlands) B De Goeijen (Austria) G Diarra	2	6	[3]
(Serbia) P Krstin (Argentina) A Velotti	3	1
3	(Spain) Í Cervantes (Netherlands) M Vervoort	6	6
WC	(Netherlands) T Griekspoor (Netherlands) T van Rijthoven	7^{11}	6
2	(Uruguay) A Behar (Croatia) D Marcan	6^{9}	3

Semifinals
1	(Netherlands) W Koolhof (Netherlands) M Middelkoop	6	6
WC	(Netherlands) R De Valk (Netherlands) R Haase	1	1
3	(Spain) Í Cervantes (Netherlands) M Vervoort	7	6^{3}	[3]
WC	(Netherlands) T Griekspoor (Netherlands) T van Rijthoven	5	7^{7}	[10]

Final
1	(Netherlands) W Koolhof (Netherlands) M Middelkoop	6	3	[13]
WC	(Netherlands) T Griekspoor (Netherlands) T van Rijthoven	1	6	[11]
