= 2013 Sport 1 Open – Singles =

Singles
- 2013 Sport 1 Open

Final
- Champion: (Netherlands) Jesse Huta Galung
- Runner-up: (Netherlands) Robin Haase
- Score: 6–3, 6–7^{(2–7)}, 6–4

Events
Singles	Doubles
- Sport 1 Open

Jerzy Janowicz was the defending champion but decided not to participate.
Jesse Huta Galung beat top seeded Robin Haase 6–3, 6–7^{(2–7)}, 6–4, to claim the title.

== Seeds ==
1. (Netherlands) Robin Haase (final)
2. (Czech Republic) Jiří Veselý (withdrew due to fever)
3. (France) Marc Gicquel (semifinals)
4. (Ukraine) Oleksandr Nedovyesov (first round)
5. (Chile) Paul Capdeville (second round)
6. (Germany) Björn Phau (first round)
7. (Germany) Simon Greul (first round)
8. (France) Florent Serra (first round)

== Draw ==
Key

- Q = Qualifier
- WC = Wild card
- LL = Lucky loser
- Alt = Alternate
- ITF = ITF entry
- PR = Protected ranking
- SR = Special ranking
- SE = Special exempt
- JE = Junior exempt
- JR = Junior Accelerator Programme entrant
- CO = College Accelerator Programme entrant
- NG = Next Gen Accelerator Program entrant
- w/o = Walkover
- r = Retired
- d = Defaulted

=== Finals ===
Semifinals
1	(Netherlands) Robin Haase	6	6
WC	(Netherlands) Thomas Schoorel	1	3
3	(France) Marc Gicquel	5	6	3
(Netherlands) Jesse Huta Galung	7	3	6

Final
1	(Netherlands) Robin Haase	3	7^{7}	4
(Netherlands) Jesse Huta Galung	6	6^{2}	6

=== Top half ===
First round
1	(Netherlands) R Haase	6	6
(France) J Ouanna	4	4
(Ukraine) I Sergeyev	6	6
SE	(Serbia) M Zekić	1	4
WC	(Netherlands) Mark de Jong	3	6	2
(Brazil) L Kirche	6	1	6
(Netherlands) M Middelkoop	6	6
7	(Germany) S Greul	3	4
4	(Ukraine) O Nedovyesov	6^{4}	6	5
(Germany) D Meffert	7^{7}	4	7
WC	(Netherlands) T Schoorel	2	6	6
(Moldova) R Albot	6	2	1
Q	(Australia) C Ebelthite	7	6
(Netherlands) B Westerhof	5	4
Q	(Italy) L Giustino	6	6
6	(Germany) B Phau	3	4

Second round
1	(Netherlands) R Haase	6	6
(Ukraine) I Sergeyev	1	0
(Brazil) L Kirche	4	6	0
(Netherlands) M Middelkoop	6	4	6
(Germany) D Meffert	4	6^{7}
WC	(Netherlands) T Schoorel	6	7^{9}
Q	(Australia) C Ebelthite	6^{3}	6	4
Q	(Italy) L Giustino	7^{7}	3	6

Quarterfinals
1	(Netherlands) R Haase	6	6
(Netherlands) M Middelkoop	4	2
WC	(Netherlands) T Schoorel	6	6^{1}	7
Q	(Italy) L Giustino	4	7^{7}	5

Semifinals
1	(Netherlands) R Haase	6	6
WC	(Netherlands) T Schoorel	1	3

=== Bottom half ===
First round
5	(Chile) P Capdeville	6	6
WC	(Netherlands) S Fransen	2	3
(Serbia) D Lojda	6	5	3
Q	(Brazil) T Monteiro	2	7	6
(Spain) A Brugués-Davi	2^{r}
WC	(Netherlands) Nick van der Meer	4
(Austria) M Fischer	1	6^{4}
3	(France) M Gicquel	6	7^{7}
8	(France) F Serra	4	4
(Netherlands) J Huta Galung	6	6
(Germany) P Gojowczyk	6	5	6
(Romania) V Crivoi	4	7	4
(Brazil) A Ghem	6	6
Q	(Latvia) A Juška	4	4
(France) S Robert	6	6
LL	(Spain) R Carballés Baena	4	4

Second round
5	(Chile) P Capdeville	6	6^{5}	4
Q	(Brazil) T Monteiro	3	7^{7}	6
WC	(Netherlands) N van der Meer	3	0
3	(France) M Gicquel	6	6
(Netherlands) J Huta Galung	2	7^{7}	6
(Germany) P Gojowczyk	6	6^{4}	4
(Brazil) A Ghem	6	3	1
(France) S Robert	2	6	6

Quarterfinals
Q	(Brazil) T Monteiro	6	2	2
3	(France) M Gicquel	3	6	6
(Netherlands) J Huta Galung	7^{7}	6
(France) S Robert	6^{5}	2

Semifinals
3	(France) M Gicquel	5	6	3
(Netherlands) J Huta Galung	7	3	6
