= 2013 Sport 1 Open =

- Date: 8 – 14 July
- Edition: 21st
- Surface: Clay
- Location: Scheveningen, Netherlands

Champions

Singles
- (Netherlands) Jesse Huta Galung

Doubles
- (Netherlands) Antal van der Duim / (Netherlands) Boy Westerhof
← 2012 ·	Sport 1 Open	· 2014 →

The 2013 Sport 1 Open was a professional tennis tournament played on clay courts. It was the 21st edition of the tournament which was part of the 2013 ATP Challenger Tour. It took place in Scheveningen, Netherlands, between 8 and 15 July 2013.

== Singles main draw entrants ==
=== Seeds ===
Country	Player	Rank^{1}	Seed
NED	Robin Haase	58	1
CZE	Jiří Veselý	103	2
FRA	Marc Gicquel	131	3
UKR	Oleksandr Nedovyesov	142	4
CHI	Paul Capdeville	148	5
GER	Björn Phau	150	6
GER	Simon Greul	157	7
FRA	Florent Serra	160	8

- ^{1} Rankings are as of June 24, 2013.

=== Other entrants ===
The following players received wildcards into the singles main draw:

- (Netherlands) Stephan Fransen
- (Netherlands) Mark de Jong
- (Netherlands) Thomas Schoorel
- (Netherlands) Nick van der Meer

The following players received special exempt into the singles main draw:

- (Serbia) Miljan Zekić

The following players received entry from the qualifying draw:

- (Australia) Colin Ebelthite
- (Italy) Lorenzo Giustino
- (Latvia) Andis Juška
- (Brazil) Thiago Monteiro

The following player received entry as a lucky loser:

- (Spain) Roberto Carballés Baena

== Champions ==
=== Singles ===
- (Netherlands) Jesse Huta Galung def. (Netherlands) Robin Haase 6–3, 6–7^{(2–7)}, 6–4

=== Doubles ===
- (Netherlands) Antal van der Duim / (Netherlands) Boy Westerhof def. (Germany) Gero Kretschmer / (Germany) Alexander Satschko 6–3, 6–3
