= 2014 Sport 1 Open – Singles =

Singles
- 2014 Sport 1 Open

Final
- Champion: (Belgium) David Goffin
- Runner-up: (Germany) Andreas Beck
- Score: 6–3, 6–2

Events
Singles	Doubles
← 2013 ·	Sport 1 Open	· 2015 →

Jesse Huta Galung was the defending champion but lost to David Goffin in the semifinals. Goffin went on to win the tournament, beating Andreas Beck 6–3, 6–2

== Seeds ==
1. (Netherlands) Robin Haase (second round)
2. (Argentina) Diego Sebastián Schwartzman (second round)
3. (Brazil) Thomaz Bellucci (second round)
4. (Kazakhstan) Aleksandr Nedovyesov (quarterfinals)
5. (Belgium) David Goffin (champion)
6. (France) Pierre-Hugues Herbert (second round)
7. (Germany) Andreas Beck (final)
8. (Brazil) João Souza (semifinals)

== Draw ==
=== Key ===
- Q = Qualifier
- WC = Wild card
- LL = Lucky loser
- Alt = Alternate
- SE = Special exempt
- PR = Protected ranking
- ITF = ITF entry
- JE = Junior exempt
- w/o = Walkover
- r = Retired
- d = Defaulted
- SR = Special ranking

=== Finals ===
Semifinals
(Netherlands) Jesse Huta Galung	0	1
5	(Belgium) David Goffin	6	6
7	(Germany) Andreas Beck	2	6	6
8	(Brazil) João Souza	6	3	4

Final
5	(Belgium) David Goffin	6	6
7	(Germany) Andreas Beck	3	2

=== Top half ===
First round
1	(Netherlands) R Haase	4	6	6
Q	(Croatia) D Marcan	6	3	0
WC	(Netherlands) B Westerhof	0^{r}
(Netherlands) J Huta Galung	4
(Austria) M Fischer	5	7^{7}	6
(France) G Burquier	7	6^{3}	0
(Belarus) U Ignatik	7	4	1
6	(France) P-H Herbert	5	6	6
4	(Kazakhstan) A Nedovyesov	6	7^{7}
WC	(Netherlands) M Middelkoop	2	6^{5}
(France) V Millot	6	3
(France) J Eysseric	1	1^{r}
WC	(Netherlands) T van Rijthoven	2	4
(Serbia) F Krajinović	6	6
(Belgium) K Coppejans	1	3
5	(Belgium) D Goffin	6	6

Second round
1	(Netherlands) R Haase	6^{4}	5
(Netherlands) J Huta Galung	7^{7}	7
(Austria) M Fischer	3	7	6
6	(France) P-H Herbert	6	5	2
4	(Kazakhstan) A Nedovyesov	6	6
(France) V Millot	4	2
(Serbia) F Krajinović	4	6^{5}
5	(Belgium) D Goffin	6	7^{7}

Quarterfinals
(Netherlands) J Huta Galung	6	6
(Austria) M Fischer	1	4
4	(Kazakhstan) A Nedovyesov	4	2
5	(Belgium) D Goffin	6	6

Semifinals
(Netherlands) J Huta Galung	0	1
5	(Belgium) D Goffin	6	6

=== Bottom half ===
First round
7	(Germany) A Beck	6	6
(Argentina) M Alund	2	4
Q	(Netherlands) W Koolhof	4	4
SE	(Spain) E López-Pérez	6	6
(Italy) M Viola	6^{7}	6	6
(Japan) T Daniel	7^{9}	2	1
(Belgium) Y Mertens	6	1	4
3	(Brazil) T Bellucci	4	6	6
8	(Brazil) J Souza	5	6	6
Q	(Russia) Alexander Rumyantsev	7	3	3
Q	(Serbia) M Tepavac	6	3	5
(Georgia (country)) N Basilashvili	4	6	7
(Argentina) H Zeballos	7^{7}	3	6
WC	(Belgium) S Darcis	6^{5}	6	4
(Romania) V Crivoi	3	0
2	(Argentina) D Schwartzman	6	6

Second round
7	(Germany) A Beck	7^{10}	6
SE	(Spain) E López-Pérez	6^{8}	2
(Italy) M Viola	5	6	7
3	(Brazil) T Bellucci	7	1	5
8	(Brazil) J Souza	7	6
(Georgia (country)) N Basilashvili	5	2
(Argentina) H Zeballos	6	3	7
2	(Argentina) D Schwartzman	3	6	5

Quarterfinals
7	(Germany) A Beck	6	6
(Italy) M Viola	4	4
8	(Brazil) J Souza	6	6
(Argentina) H Zeballos	3	3

Semifinals
7	(Germany) A Beck	2	6	6
8	(Brazil) J Souza	6	3	4
