= 2012 The Hague Open – Doubles =

Doubles
- 2012 The Hague Open

Final
- Champions: (Netherlands) Antal van der Duim (Netherlands) Boy Westerhof
- Runners-up: (Australia) Rameez Junaid (Germany) Simon Stadler
- Score: 6–4, 5–7, [10–7]

Events
Singles	Doubles
← 2011 ·	The Hague Open	· 2013 →

Colin Ebelthite and Adam Feeney were the defending champions but decided not to participate.
Antal van der Duim and Boy Westerhof won the title, defeating Rameez Junaid and Simon Stadler 6–4, 5–7, [10–7] in the final.

== Seeds ==
1. (India) Purav Raja / (France) Stéphane Robert (first round)
2. (Australia) Rameez Junaid / (Germany) Simon Stadler (final)
3. (Brazil) Tiago Fernandes / (Brazil) Thiago Monteiro (first round)
4. (Argentina) Martín Alund / (Uruguay) Ariel Behar (first round)

== Draw ==
=== Key ===
- Q = Qualifier
- WC = Wild card
- LL = Lucky loser
- Alt = Alternate
- SE = Special exempt
- PR = Protected ranking
- ITF = ITF entry
- JE = Junior exempt
- w/o = Walkover
- r = Retired
- d = Defaulted
- SR = Special ranking

=== Draw ===
First round
1	(India) P Raja (France) S Robert	3	4
(Australia) A Hubble (Australia) Nima Roshan	6	6
(Argentina) M González (Argentina) D Junqueira	3	4
(Netherlands) J Huta Galung (Austria) P Oswald	6	6
4	(Argentina) M Alund (Uruguay) A Behar	2	6	[7]
WC	(Netherlands) M Middelkoop (Netherlands) Miliaan Niesten	6	3	[10]
(Netherlands) A van der Duim (Netherlands) B Westerhof	6	1	[10]
(Germany) G Kretschmer (Germany) A Satschko	4	6	[6]
(Spain) I Cervantes Huegun (Finland) T Nieminen	6^{5}	6	[10]
(Russia) K Kravchuk (France) A Sidorenko	7^{7}	4	[5]
(France) N Devilder (France) A Gensse	6	2	[10]
Alt/3	(Brazil) T Fernandes (Brazil) T Monteiro	4	6	[7]
WC	(Netherlands) S Korteling (Netherlands) Kevin Schimmel	6^{5}	7	[1]
(Czech Republic) J Mertl (Kazakhstan) Y Schukin	7^{7}	5	[10]
WC	(Netherlands) Stephan Fransen (Netherlands) N van der Meer	6	3	[5]
2	(Australia) R Junaid (Germany) S Stadler	2	6	[10]

Quarterfinals
(Australia) A Hubble (Australia) N Roshan	6	7^{7}
WC	(Netherlands) J Huta Galung (Austria) P Oswald	2	6^{1}
(Netherlands) M Middelkoop (Netherlands) Miliaan Niesten	6	6^{4}	[6]
(Netherlands) A van der Duim (Netherlands) B Westerhof	1	7^{7}	[10]
(Spain) I Cervantes Huegun (Finland) T Nieminen	w/o
(France) N Devilder (France) A Gensse
(Czech Republic) J Mertl (Kazakhstan) Y Schukin	3	1
2	(Australia) R Junaid (Germany) S Stadler	6	6

Semifinals
(Australia) A Hubble (Australia) N Roshan	5	4
(Netherlands) A van der Duim (Netherlands) B Westerhof	7	6
(Spain) I Cervantes Huegun (Finland) T Nieminen	6	3	[10]
2	(Australia) R Junaid (Germany) S Stadler	4	6	[12]

Final
(Netherlands) A van der Duim (Netherlands) B Westerhof	6	5	[10]
2	(Australia) R Junaid (Germany) S Stadler	4	7	[7]
