= 2014 Sport 1 Open – Doubles =

Doubles
- 2014 Sport 1 Open

Final
- Champions: (Netherlands) Matwé Middelkoop (Netherlands) Boy Westerhof
- Runners-up: (Austria) Martin Fischer (Netherlands) Jesse Huta Galung
- Score: 6–4, 3–6, [10–6]

Events
Singles	Doubles
← 2013 ·	Sport 1 Open	· 2015 →

Antal van der Duim and Boy Westerhof are the two-time defending champions. van der Duim elected not to play and Westerhof paired up with Matwé Middelkoop. Westerhof and Middelkoop won the title defeating Martin Fischer & Jesse Huta Galung in the final 6–4, 3–6, [10–6].

== Seeds ==
1. (Argentina) Diego Sebastian Schwartzman / (Argentina) Horacio Zeballos (first round)
2. (United States) James Cerretani / (Germany) Frank Moser (semifinals)
3. (Netherlands) Stephan Fransen / (Netherlands) Wesley Koolhof (quarterfinals)
4. (Austria) Martin Fischer / (Netherlands) Jesse Huta Galung (final)

== Draw ==
=== Key ===
- Q = Qualifier
- WC = Wild card
- LL = Lucky loser
- Alt = Alternate
- SE = Special exempt
- PR = Protected ranking
- ITF = ITF entry
- JE = Junior exempt
- w/o = Walkover
- r = Retired
- d = Defaulted
- SR = Special ranking

First round
1	(Argentina) D Schwartzman (Argentina) H Zeballos
(Netherlands) M Middelkoop (Netherlands) B Westerhof	w/o
WC	(Netherlands) R de Valk (Netherlands) T van Rijthoven	6^{6}	3
(Puerto Rico) A Llompart (South Africa) D O'Brien	7	6
3	(Netherlands) S Fransen (Netherlands) W Koolhof	6	6
WC	(Netherlands) E Haase (Netherlands) R Haase	3	1
(France) P Herbert (Croatia) D Marcan	5	6	10
PR	(United States) A El-Effendi (United Kingdom) D Walsh	7	3	5
(Argentina) M Alund (Italy) M Viola	w/o
(Japan) T Daniel (Russia) A Rumyantsev
(Netherlands) R Frantzen (Spain) E López Pérez	1	3
4	(Austria) M Fischer (Netherlands) J Huta Galung	6	6
(France) G Burquier (Belgium) Y Mertens	2	6	6
WC	(Netherlands) S Arends (Netherlands) N Lootsma	6	4	10
(Serbia) F Krajinović (Serbia) G Tošić	6	1	9
2	(United States) J Cerretani (Germany) F Moser	4	6	11

Quarterfinals
(Netherlands) M Middelkoop (Netherlands) B Westerhof	5	6	14
(Puerto Rico) A Llompart (South Africa) D O'Brien	7	1	12
3	(Netherlands) S Fransen (Netherlands) W Koolhof	1	2
(France) P Herbert (Croatia) D Marcan	6	6
(Argentina) M Alund (Italy) M Viola	5	1
4	(Austria) M Fischer (Netherlands) J Huta Galung	7	6
WC	(Netherlands) S Arends (Netherlands) N Lootsma	5	2
2	(United States) J Cerretani (Germany) F Moser	7	6

Semifinals
(Netherlands) M Middelkoop (Netherlands) B Westerhof	6	6
(France) P Herbert (Croatia) D Marcan	1	1
4	(Austria) M Fischer (Netherlands) J Huta Galung	6	3	[10]
2	(United States) J Cerretani (Germany) F Moser	3	6	[5]

Final
(Netherlands) M Middelkoop (Netherlands) B Westerhof	6	3	[10]
4	(Austria) M Fischer (Netherlands) J Huta Galung	4	6	[6]
