= 2012 The Hague Open =

- Date: 9 – 15 July
- Edition: 20th
- Surface: Clay
- Location: Scheveningen, Netherlands

Champions

Singles
- (Poland) Jerzy Janowicz

Doubles
- (Netherlands) Antal van der Duim / (Netherlands) Boy Westerhof
| ← 2011 · | The Hague Open | · 2013 → |

The 2012 The Hague Open was a professional tennis tournament played on clay courts. It was the 20th edition of the tournament which was part of the 2012 ATP Challenger Tour and the Tretorn SERIE+. It took place in Scheveningen, Netherlands between 9 and 15 July 2012.

== Singles main draw entrants ==
=== Seeds ===
| Country | Player | Rank^{1} | Seed |
|---|---|---|---|
| POL | Jerzy Janowicz | 136 | 1 |
| RUS | Teymuraz Gabashvili | 147 | 2 |
| FRA | Augustin Gensse | 150 | 3 |
| ESP | Iñigo Cervantes Huegun | 152 | 4 |
| ARG | Martín Alund | 158 | 5 |
| FRA | Kenny de Schepper | 160 | 6 |
| ARG | Máximo González | 170 | 7 |
| CZE | Jan Mertl | 174 | 8 |

- ^{1} Rankings are as of June 25, 2012.

=== Other entrants ===
The following players received wildcards into the singles main draw:

- (Belgium) Kimmer Coppejans
- (Netherlands) Thiemo de Bakker
- (Netherlands) Mark de Jong
- (Netherlands) Matwé Middelkoop

The following players received entry from the qualifying draw:

- (Australia) Rameez Junaid
- (Brazil) Thiago Monteiro
- (Kazakhstan) Yuri Schukin
- (France) Alexandre Sidorenko

== Champions ==
=== Singles ===
- (Poland) Jerzy Janowicz def. (Netherlands) Matwé Middelkoop, 6–2, 6–2

=== Doubles ===
- (Netherlands) Antal van der Duim / (Netherlands) Boy Westerhof def. (Australia) Rameez Junaid / (Germany) Simon Stadler, 6–4, 5–7, [10–7]
