= 2014 Sport 1 Open =

- Date: 7 – 14 July
- Edition: 22nd
- Surface: Clay
- Location: Scheveningen, Netherlands

Champions

Singles
- (Belgium) David Goffin

Doubles
- (Netherlands) Matwé Middelkoop / (Netherlands) Boy Westerhof
← 2013 ·	Sport 1 Open	· 2015 →

The 2014 Sport 1 Open was a professional tennis tournament played on clay courts. It was the 22nd edition of the tournament which was part of the 2014 ATP Challenger Tour. It took place in Scheveningen, Netherlands between 7 and 13 July 2014.

== Singles main-draw entrants ==
=== Seeds ===
Country	Player	Rank^{1}	Seed
NED	Robin Haase	53	1
ARG	Diego Sebastián Schwartzman	93	2
BRA	Thomaz Bellucci	97	3
UKR	Oleksandr Nedovyesov	102	4
BEL	David Goffin	105	5
FRA	Pierre-Hugues Herbert	130	6
GER	Andreas Beck	131	7
BRA	João Souza	133	8

- ^{1} Rankings are as of June 24, 2014.

=== Other entrants ===
The following players received wildcards into the singles main draw:

- (Belgium) Steve Darcis
- (Netherlands) Matwé Middelkoop
- (Netherlands) Tim Van Rijthoven
- (Netherlands) Boy Westerhof

The following players received special exempt into the singles main draw:

- (Spain) Enrique López Pérez

The following players received entry from the qualifying draw:

- (Netherlands) Wesley Koolhof
- (Croatia) Dino Marcan
- (Russia) Alexander Rumyantsev
- (Serbia) Marko Tepavac

== Doubles main-draw entrants ==
=== Seeds ===
Country	Player	Country	Player	Rank^{1}	Seed
ARG	Diego Sebastian Schwartzman	ARG	Horacio Zeballos	227	1
USA	James Cerretani	GER	Frank Moser	259	2
NED	Stephan Fransen	NED	Wesley Koolhof	334	3
AUT	Martin Fischer	NED	Jesse Huta Galung	521	4

- ^{1} Rankings as of June 24, 2014.

=== Other entrants ===
The following pairs received wildcards into the doubles main draw:

- (Netherlands) Roy de Valk / (Netherlands) Tim van Rijthoven
- (Netherlands) Eric Haase / (Netherlands) Robin Haase
- (Netherlands) Sander Arends / (Netherlands) Niels Lootsma

== Champions ==
=== Singles ===
- (Belgium) David Goffin def. (Germany) Andreas Beck 6–3,6–2

=== Doubles ===
- (Netherlands) Matwé Middelkoop / (Netherlands) Boy Westerhof def. (Netherlands) Jesse Huta Galung / (Austria) Martin Fischer 6–4, 3–6, [10–6]
