= 2015 Sport 1 Open – Singles =

Participant information

Singles
- 2015 Sport 1 Open

Final
- Champion: (Georgia (country)) Nikoloz Basilashvili
- Runner-up: (Russia) Andrey Kuznetsov
- Score: 6–7^{(3–7)}, 7–6^{(7–4)}, 6–3

Events
Singles	Doubles
← 2014 ·	Sport 1 Open	· 2016 →

David Goffin was the defending champion, but he did not participate this year.

Nikoloz Basilashvili won the tournament. He defeating Andrey Kuznetsov in the final, after saving three match points.

== Seeds ==
1. (Netherlands) Robin Haase (semifinals)
2. (Spain) Daniel Muñoz de la Nava (quarterfinals)
3. (Germany) Jan-Lennard Struff (first round)
4. (Kazakhstan) Aleksandr Nedovyesov (second round)
5. (Spain) Íñigo Cervantes (second round)
6. (Georgia (country)) Nikoloz Basilashvili (champion)
7. (Russia) Andrey Kuznetsov (final)
8. (Slovakia) Norbert Gombos (first round)

== Draw ==
=== Key ===
- Q = Qualifier
- WC = Wild card
- LL = Lucky loser
- Alt = Alternate
- SE = Special exempt
- PR = Protected ranking
- ITF = ITF entry
- JE = Junior exempt
- w/o = Walkover
- r = Retired
- d = Defaulted
- SR = Special ranking

=== Finals ===
Semifinals
1	(Netherlands) Robin Haase	6	4	2
7	(Russia) Andrey Kuznetsov	2	6	6
6	(Georgia (country)) Nikoloz Basilashvili	3	7	6
(Netherlands) Thiemo de Bakker	6	5	2

Final
7	(Russia) Andrey Kuznetsov	7^{7}	6^{4}	3
6	(Georgia (country)) Nikoloz Basilashvili	6^{3}	7^{7}	6

=== Top half ===
First round
1	(Netherlands) R Haase	7	5	6
(Russia) A Karatsev	5	7	4
(Argentina) H Zeballos	7	6
LL	(France) A Sidorenko	5	1
WC	(Netherlands) T Schoorel	6^{6}	3
(Romania) A Ungur	7^{8}	6
Q	(Russia) A Vatutin	3	5
5	(Spain) Í Cervantes	6	7
3	(Germany) J-L Struff	6	3	4
(Czech Republic) A Pavlásek	3	6	6
WC	(Netherlands) S Griekspoor	1	6	7^{7}
Q	(Ukraine) A Smirnov	6	2	6^{2}
(Romania) V Hănescu	3	7^{7}	2
(Slovakia) J Kovalík	6	6^{2}	6
(Netherlands) J Huta Galung	3	3
7	(Russia) A Kuznetsov	6	6

Second round
1	(Netherlands) R Haase	6	7
(Argentina) H Zeballos	4	5
(Romania) A Ungur	2	6	6
5	(Spain) Í Cervantes	6	2	1
(Czech Republic) A Pavlásek	6	6
WC	(Netherlands) S Griekspoor	4	4
(Slovakia) J Kovalík	2	7^{9}	2
7	(Russia) A Kuznetsov	6	6^{7}	6

Quarterfinals
1	(Netherlands) R Haase	2	6	6
(Romania) A Ungur	6	3	2
(Czech Republic) A Pavlásek	4	4
7	(Russia) A Kuznetsov	6	6

Semifinals
1	(Netherlands) R Haase	6	4	2
7	(Russia) A Kuznetsov	2	6	6

=== Bottom half ===
First round
6	(Georgia (country)) N Basilashvili	4	6	6
Q	(Russia) P Davydenko	6	3	3
WC	(Germany) F Mayer	6	6
Q	(Netherlands) Roy de Valk	2	1
(Czech Republic) J Mertl	4	2
(Slovakia) A Martin	6	6
(Kazakhstan) A Golubev	6	6^{2}	2
4	(Kazakhstan) A Nedovyesov	2	7^{7}	6
8	(Slovakia) N Gombos	4	2
(Netherlands) T de Bakker	6	6
LL	(Belgium) Alexandre Folie	6	6
WC	(Netherlands) Tim van Terheijden	1	2
(Spain) J Samper-Montaña	0	6	6
(France) M Bourque	6	1	4
(Germany) T Pütz	6	3	1
2	(Spain) D Muñoz de la Nava	4	6	6

Second round
6	(Georgia (country)) N Basilashvili	6	5	6
WC	(Germany) F Mayer	2	7	4
(Slovakia) A Martin	7^{7}	6
4	(Kazakhstan) A Nedovyesov	6^{5}	3
(Netherlands) T de Bakker	6	6
LL	(Belgium) A Folie	2	0
(Spain) J Samper-Montaña	4	4
2	(Spain) D Muñoz de la Nava	6	6

Quarterfinals
6	(Georgia (country)) N Basilashvili	6	1	6
(Slovakia) A Martin	1	6	3
(Netherlands) T de Bakker	5	6	6
2	(Spain) D Muñoz de la Nava	7	4	4

Semifinals
6	(Georgia (country)) N Basilashvili	3	7	6
(Netherlands) T de Bakker	6	5	2
