= 2011 The Hague Open – Singles =

Singles
- 2011 The Hague Open

Final
- Champion: (Belgium) Steve Darcis
- Runner-up: (Turkey) Marsel İlhan
- Score: 6–3, 4–6, 6–2

Events
Singles	Doubles
← 2010 ·	The Hague Open	· 2012 →

Denis Gremelmayr was the defending champion but decided not to participate.
Steve Darcis won in the final 6–3, 4–6, 6–2 against Marsel İlhan.

== Seeds ==
1. (Turkey) Marsel İlhan (final)
2. (Belgium) Steve Darcis (champion)
3. (France) Éric Prodon (quarterfinals)
4. (France) Marc Gicquel (second round)
5. (France) Stéphane Robert (first round)
6. (Russia) Teymuraz Gabashvili (second round)
7. (Czech Republic) Ivo Minář (quarterfinals)
8. (Germany) Julian Reister (first round)

== Draw ==
=== Key ===
- Q = Qualifier
- WC = Wild card
- LL = Lucky loser
- Alt = Alternate
- SE = Special exempt
- PR = Protected ranking
- ITF = ITF entry
- JE = Junior exempt
- w/o = Walkover
- r = Retired
- d = Defaulted
- SR = Special ranking

=== Finals ===
Semifinals
1	(Turkey) Marsel İlhan	1	6	6
(France) Augustin Gensse	6	3	1
(Czech Republic) Dušan Lojda	1	5
2	(Belgium) Steve Darcis	6	7

Final
1	(Turkey) Marsel İlhan	3	6	2
2	(Belgium) Steve Darcis	6	4	6

=== Top half ===
First round
1	(Turkey) M İlhan	6	6
(Argentina) F del Bonis	3	2
Q	(France) P-H Herbert	4	2
(Spain) D Muñoz-De La Nava	6	6
(France) J Dasnières de Veigy	5	3
(Spain) J Martí	7	6
(Belgium) D Goffin	6	7
5	(France) S Robert	3	6
4	(France) M Gicquel	6	7^{7}
Q	(Finland) J Paukku	3	6^{3}
(Finland) H Heliövaara	5	2
(France) A Gensse	7	6
(Australia) J Lemke	5	1
(Netherlands) M Middelkoop	7	6
WC	(Netherlands) N van der Meer	5	2
6	(Russia) T Gabashvili	7	6

Second round
1	(Turkey) M İlhan	6	2	6
(Spain) D Muñoz-De La Nava	1	6	0
(Spain) J Martí	4	4
(Belgium) D Goffin	6	6
4	(France) M Gicquel	6	5	2
(France) A Gensse	1	7	6
(Netherlands) M Middelkoop	1	6	6
6	(Russia) T Gabashvili	6	1	2

Quarterfinals
1	(Turkey) M İlhan	4	7^{7}	6
(Belgium) D Goffin	6	6^{3}	4
(France) A Gensse	5	6	7^{7}
(Netherlands) M Middelkoop	7	0	6^{6}

Semifinals
1	(Turkey) M İlhan	1	6	6
(France) A Gensse	6	3	1

=== Bottom half ===
First round
8	(Germany) J Reister	7^{7}	4	0
(Germany) Jan-Lennard Struff	6^{0}	6	6
Q	(France) M Rodrigues	4	3
(Czech Republic) D Lojda	6	6
Q	(Australia) C Ebelthite	6	7^{7}
(France) V Millot	4	6^{5}
(Belgium) Y Mertens	3	4
3	(France) É Prodon	6	6
7/WC	(Czech Republic) I Minář	6	6
WC	(Netherlands) A van der Duim	1	2
(Ukraine) A Smirnov	6	7
(Germany) D Meffert	4	5
(Germany) B Phau	6	6
WC	(Netherlands) Stephan Fransen	3	1
(Czech Republic) J Mertl	4	4
2	(Belgium) S Darcis	6	6

Second round
(Germany) Jan-Lennard Struff	4	2
(Czech Republic) D Lojda	6	6
Q	(Australia) C Ebelthite	4	4
3	(France) É Prodon	6	6
7/WC	(Czech Republic) I Minář	6	6
(Ukraine) A Smirnov	3	1
(Germany) B Phau	6	0	3
2	(Belgium) S Darcis	3	6	6

Quarterfinals
(Czech Republic) D Lojda	6	6
3	(France) É Prodon	3	3
7/WC	(Czech Republic) I Minář	6	2	5
2	(Belgium) S Darcis	0	6	7

Semifinals
(Czech Republic) D Lojda	1	5
2	(Belgium) S Darcis	6	7
