= 2011 The Hague Open – Doubles =

Doubles
- 2011 The Hague Open

Final
- Champions: (Australia) Colin Ebelthite (Australia) Adam Feeney
- Runners-up: (Australia) Rameez Junaid (Australia) Sadik Kadir
- Score: 6–4, 6–7^{(5–7)}, [10–7]

Events
Singles	Doubles
← 2010 ·	The Hague Open	· 2012 →

Franco Ferreiro and Harsh Mankad were the defending champions but decided not to participate.

Colin Ebelthite and Adam Feeney won in the all-Australian final, against Rameez Junaid and Sadik Kadir, 6–4, 6–7^{(5–7)}, [10–7].

== Seeds ==
1. (Australia) Colin Ebelthite / (Australia) Adam Feeney (champions)
2. (Australia) Rameez Junaid / (Australia) Sadik Kadir (final)
3. (France) Olivier Charroin / (France) Stéphane Robert (semifinals)
4. (France) Pierre-Hugues Herbert / (France) Nicolas Renavand (first round)

== Draw ==
=== Key ===
- Q = Qualifier
- WC = Wild card
- LL = Lucky loser
- Alt = Alternate
- SE = Special exempt
- PR = Protected ranking
- ITF = ITF entry
- JE = Junior exempt
- w/o = Walkover
- r = Retired
- d = Defaulted
- SR = Special ranking

=== Draw ===
First round
1	(Australia) C Ebelthite (Australia) A Feeney	7^{7}	1	[10]
(Belgium) M Authom (France) M Rodrigues	6^{2}	6	[8]
(Sweden) Johan Landsberg (Spain) S Pérez-Pérez	6	6
(France) É Prodon (France) Victor Teboul	0	2
4	(France) P-H Herbert (France) N Renavand	4	7	[5]
(Finland) H Heliövaara (Finland) J Paukku	6	5	[10]
(Spain) Óscar Burrieza (Spain) J Martí	6	1	[6]
(Netherlands) Stephan Fransen (Netherlands) N van der Meer	3	6	[10]
(Belgium) S Darcis (Spain) D Muñoz-De La Nava	6	4	[10]
WC	(Netherlands) M Middelkoop (Australia) J Sirianni	1	6	[5]
(France) J Dasnières de Veigy (France) A Gensse	2	7^{7}	[7]
3	(France) O Charroin (France) S Robert	6	6^{5}	[10]
(Czech Republic) D Lojda (Czech Republic) J Mertl	3	3
(Netherlands) A van der Duim (Netherlands) Tim van Terheijden	6	6
(United States) B Battistone (Belgium) N Desein	2	2
2	(Australia) R Junaid (Australia) S Kadir	6	6

Quarterfinals
1	(Australia) C Ebelthite (Australia) A Feeney	6	6
(Sweden) Johan Landsberg (Spain) S Pérez-Pérez	2	4
(Finland) H Heliövaara (Finland) J Paukku	4	7^{8}	[6]
(Netherlands) Stephan Fransen (Netherlands) N van der Meer	6	6^{6}	[10]
(Belgium) S Darcis (Spain) D Muñoz-De La Nava	4	7^{9}	[5]
3	(France) O Charroin (France) S Robert	6	6^{7}	[10]
(Netherlands) A van der Duim (Netherlands) Tim van Terheijden	6	5	[7]
2	(Australia) R Junaid (Australia) S Kadir	4	7	[10]

Semifinals
1	(Australia) C Ebelthite (Australia) A Feeney	6	6
(Netherlands) Stephan Fransen (Netherlands) N van der Meer	4	2
3	(France) O Charroin (France) S Robert	4	0
2	(Australia) R Junaid (Australia) S Kadir	6	6

Final
1	(Australia) C Ebelthite (Australia) A Feeney	6	6^{5}	[10]
2	(Australia) R Junaid (Australia) S Kadir	4	7^{7}	[7]
