= 2017 The Hague Open – Singles =

Singles
- 2017 The Hague Open

Final
- Champion: (Spain) Guillermo García López
- Runner-up: (Belgium) Ruben Bemelmans
- Score: 6–1, 6–7^{(3–7)}, 6–2

Events
Singles	Doubles
← 2016 ·	The Hague Open	· 2018 →

Robin Haase was the defending champion but lost in the first round to Thiemo de Bakker.

Guillermo García López won the title after defeating Ruben Bemelmans 6–1, 6–7^{(3–7)}, 6–2 in the final.

== Seeds ==
1. (Netherlands) Robin Haase (first round)
2. (Japan) Taro Daniel (first round)
3. (Portugal) Gastão Elias (second round)
4. (Ukraine) Sergiy Stakhovsky (second round)
5. (Belgium) Ruben Bemelmans (final)
6. (Spain) Guillermo García López (champion)
7. (Brazil) João Souza (first round)
8. (Slovakia) Jozef Kovalík (second round)

== Draw ==
=== Key ===
- Q = Qualifier
- WC = Wild card
- LL = Lucky loser
- Alt = Alternate
- SE = Special exempt
- PR = Protected ranking
- ITF = ITF entry
- JE = Junior exempt
- w/o = Walkover
- r = Retired
- d = Defaulted
- SR = Special ranking

=== Finals ===
Semifinals
WC	(Netherlands) Thiemo de Bakker	3^{r}
6	(Spain) Guillermo García López	4
5	(Belgium) Ruben Bemelmans	6	6
Q	(Serbia) Marko Tepavac	2	1

Final
6	(Spain) Guillermo García López	6	6^{3}	6
5	(Belgium) Ruben Bemelmans	1	7^{7}	2

=== Top half ===
First round
1/WC	(Netherlands) R Haase	6^{7}	4
WC	(Netherlands) T de Bakker	7^{9}	6
(Italy) R Bellotti	4	6	7^{7}
Q	(Argentina) JI Londero	6	1	6^{2}
(Portugal) J Domingues	6^{3}	4
(Greece) S Tsitsipas	7^{7}	6
(Germany) D Brands	3	6^{4}
8	(Slovakia) J Kovalík	6	7^{7}
3	(Portugal) G Elias	5	6	6
(Bosnia and Herzegovina) M Bašić	7	3	4
WC	(Netherlands) B van de Zandschulp	4	6	6
(Belgium) Y Mertens	6	3	2
(Argentina) M González	6	6
(Belgium) Clément Geens	4	2
(Netherlands) T Griekspoor	4	6	2
6	(Spain) G García López	6	1	6

Second round
WC	(Netherlands) T de Bakker	6	6^{11}	6
(Italy) R Bellotti	4	7^{13}	2
(Greece) S Tsitsipas	7	6
8	(Slovakia) J Kovalík	5	1
3	(Portugal) G Elias	6	1	3
WC	(Netherlands) B van de Zandschulp	2	6	6
(Argentina) M González	7	3	4
6	(Spain) G García López	5	6	6

Quarterfinals
WC	(Netherlands) T de Bakker	6	6
(Greece) S Tsitsipas	1	4
WC	(Netherlands) B van de Zandschulp	4	3
6	(Spain) G García López	6	6

Semifinals
WC	(Netherlands) T de Bakker	3^{r}
6	(Spain) G García López	4

=== Bottom half ===
First round
5	(Belgium) R Bemelmans	6	6
(Austria) S Ofner	2	0
(France) G Sakharov	7^{7}	3	6
LL	(Australia) M Banes	6^{4}	6	4
WC	(Netherlands) Michiel de Krom	0	3
PR	(Italy) S Bolelli	6	6
Q	(Germany) George von Massow	6^{5}	2
4	(Ukraine) S Stakhovsky	7^{7}	6
7	(Brazil) J Souza	6^{5}	6	3
(Belgium) J De Loore	7^{7}	4	6
(Spain) Í Cervantes	6	6
Q	(Netherlands) S Verbeek	3	4
(Spain) D Gimeno Traver	3	4
Q	(Serbia) M Tepavac	6	6
(Serbia) F Krajinović	7	7^{7}
2	(Japan) T Daniel	5	6^{2}

Second round
5	(Belgium) R Bemelmans	6	2	6
(France) G Sakharov	3	6	3
PR	(Italy) S Bolelli	6	3	6
4	(Ukraine) S Stakhovsky	4	6	3
(Belgium) J De Loore	6	6
(Spain) Í Cervantes	2	3
Q	(Serbia) M Tepavac	2	6	6
(Serbia) F Krajinović	6	3	2

Quarterfinals
5	(Belgium) R Bemelmans	6	6
PR	(Italy) S Bolelli	2	4
(Belgium) J De Loore	6^{3}	6	3
Q	(Serbia) M Tepavac	7^{7}	4	6

Semifinals
5	(Belgium) R Bemelmans	6	6
Q	(Serbia) M Tepavac	2	1
