= 2017 The Hague Open =

- Date: 17 – 23 July
- Edition: 25th
- Surface: Clay
- Location: Scheveningen, Netherlands

Champions

Singles
- (Spain) Guillermo García López

Doubles
- (Belgium) Sander Gillé / (Belgium) Joran Vliegen
← 2016 ·	The Hague Open	· 2018 →

The 2017 The Hague Open was a professional tennis tournament played on clay courts. It was the 25th edition of the tournament and was part of the 2017 ATP Challenger Tour. It took place in Scheveningen, Netherlands between 17 and 23 July 2017.

== Singles main-draw entrants ==
=== Seeds ===
Country	Player	Rank^{1}	Seed
NED	Robin Haase	38	1
JPN	Taro Daniel	92	2
POR	Gastão Elias	115	3
UKR	Sergiy Stakhovsky	122	4
BEL	Ruben Bemelmans	124	5
ESP	Guillermo García López	143	6
BRA	João Souza	150	7
SVK	Jozef Kovalík	159	8

- ^{1} Rankings are as of 3 July 2017.

=== Other entrants ===
The following players received wildcards into the singles main draw:

- (Netherlands) Thiemo de Bakker
- (Netherlands) Michiel de Krom
- (Netherlands) Robin Haase
- (Netherlands) Botic van de Zandschulp

The following player received entry into the singles main draw using a protected ranking:

- (Italy) Simone Bolelli

The following players received entry from the qualifying draw:

- (Argentina) Juan Ignacio Londero
- (Serbia) Marko Tepavac
- (Netherlands) Sem Verbeek
- (Germany) George von Massow

The following player received entry as a lucky loser:

- (Australia) Maverick Banes

== Champions ==
=== Singles ===
- (Spain) Guillermo García López def. (Belgium) Ruben Bemelmans 6–1, 6–7^{(3–7)}, 6–2.

=== Doubles ===
- (Belgium) Sander Gillé / (Belgium) Joran Vliegen def. (Slovakia) Jozef Kovalík / (Greece) Stefanos Tsitsipas 6–2, 4–6, [12–10].
