= 2011 The Hague Open =

- Date: July 4 – July 10
- Edition: 19th
- Location: Scheveningen, Netherlands

Champions

Singles
- (Belgium) Steve Darcis

Doubles
- (Australia) Colin Ebelthite / (Australia) Adam Feeney
- The Hague Open

The 2011 Siemens Open was a professional tennis tournament played on clay courts. It was part of the Tretorn SERIE+ of the 2011 ATP Challenger Tour. It was the 19th edition of the tournament. It took place in Scheveningen, Netherlands between July 4 and July 10, 2011.

== ATP entrants ==
=== Seeds ===
Country	Player	Rank^{1}	Seed
TUR	Marsel İlhan	105	1
BEL	Steve Darcis	106	2
FRA	Éric Prodon	107	3
FRA	Marc Gicquel	119	4
FRA	Stéphane Robert	120	5
RUS	Teymuraz Gabashvili	129	6
CZE	Ivo Minář	132	7
GER	Julian Reister	135	8

- ^{1} Rankings are as of June 20, 2011.

=== Other entrants ===
The following players received wildcards into the singles main draw:

- (Netherlands) Stephan Fransen
- (Czech Republic) Ivo Minář
- (Netherlands) Antal van der Duim
- (Netherlands) Nick van der Meer

The following players received entry from the qualifying draw:

- (Australia) Colin Ebelthite
- (France) Pierre-Hugues Herbert
- (Finland) Juho Paukku
- (France) Mathieu Rodrigues

== Champions ==
=== Singles ===
(Belgium) Steve Darcis def. (Turkey) Marsel İlhan, 6–3, 4–6, 6–2

=== Doubles ===
(Australia) Colin Ebelthite / (Australia) Adam Feeney def. (Australia) Rameez Junaid / (Australia) Sadik Kadir, 6–4, 6–7^{(5–7)}, [10–7]
