= 2018 The Hague Open – Doubles =

Doubles
- 2018 The Hague Open

Final
- Champions: (Philippines) Ruben Gonzales (United States) Nathaniel Lammons
- Runners-up: (Venezuela) Luis David Martínez (Portugal) Gonçalo Oliveira
- Score: 6–3, 6–7^{(8–10)}, [10–5]

Events
Singles	Doubles
- The Hague Open

Sander Gillé and Joran Vliegen were the defending champions but chose not to defend their title.

Ruben Gonzales and Nathaniel Lammons won the title after defeating Luis David Martínez and Gonçalo Oliveira 6–3, 6–7^{(8–10)}, [10–5] in the final.

== Seeds ==
1. (Germany) Andre Begemann / (Germany) Dustin Brown (semifinals)
2. (United States) Nathan Pasha / (United States) Hunter Reese (semifinals)
3. (Venezuela) Luis David Martínez / (Portugal) Gonçalo Oliveira (final)
4. (Philippines) Ruben Gonzales / (United States) Nathaniel Lammons (champions)

== Draw ==
Key

- Q = Qualifier
- WC = Wild card
- LL = Lucky loser
- Alt = Alternate
- ITF = ITF entry
- PR = Protected ranking
- SR = Special ranking
- SE = Special exempt
- JE = Junior exempt
- JR = Junior Accelerator Programme entrant
- CO = College Accelerator Programme entrant
- NG = Next Gen Accelerator Program entrant
- w/o = Walkover
- r = Retired
- d = Defaulted

First round
1	(Germany) A Begemann (Germany) D Brown	6	6
(France) C Denolly (France) A Müller	0	2
WC	(Netherlands) G Brouwer (Netherlands) J Sels	7	5	[7]
(France) G Blancaneaux (France) A Hoang	5	7	[10]
3	(Venezuela) LD Martínez (Portugal) G Oliveira	6	6
(Italy) M Donati (Italy) A Giannessi	3	1
(Turkey) T Altuna (Mexico) H Hach Verdugo	2	6^{6}
(Belarus) U Ignatik (Chinese Taipei) T-h Yang	6	7^{8}
(France) E Benchetrit (Spain) N Kuhn	1	7^{7}	[7]
(Belgium) K Coppejans (Belgium) N Desein	6	6^{5}	[10]
WC	(Netherlands) Miliaan Niesten (Netherlands) I Sijsling	3	4
4	(Philippines) R Gonzales (United States) N Lammons	6	6
(Netherlands) M Vervoort (Poland) S Walków	4	4
Alt	(Germany) Jeremy Jahn (Germany) P Torebko	6	6
WC	(Netherlands) J de Jong (Netherlands) Ryan Nijboer	3	1
2	(United States) N Pasha (United States) H Reese	6	6

Quarterfinals
1	(Germany) A Begemann (Germany) D Brown	7	6
(France) G Blancaneaux (France) A Hoang	5	3
3	(Venezuela) LD Martínez (Portugal) G Oliveira	6	6
(Belarus) U Ignatik (Chinese Taipei) T-h Yang	3	4
(Belgium) K Coppejans (Belgium) N Desein	6^{8}	6	[7]
4	(Philippines) R Gonzales (United States) N Lammons	7^{10}	4	[10]
Alt	(Germany) J Jahn (Germany) P Torebko	6	2	[5]
2	(United States) N Pasha (United States) H Reese	4	6	[10]

Semifinals
1	(Germany) A Begemann (Germany) D Brown	6^{4}	4
3	(Venezuela) LD Martínez (Portugal) G Oliveira	7^{7}	6
4	(Philippines) R Gonzales (United States) N Lammons	6	6
2	(United States) N Pasha (United States) H Reese	4	3

Final
3	(Venezuela) LD Martínez (Portugal) G Oliveira	3	7^{10}	[5]
4	(Philippines) R Gonzales (United States) N Lammons	6	6^{8}	[10]
