= 2015 Sport 1 Open =

- Date: 20 – 26 July
- Edition: 23rd
- Surface: Clay
- Location: Scheveningen, Netherlands

Champions

Singles
- (Georgia (country)) Nikoloz Basilashvili

Doubles
- (Uruguay) Ariel Behar / (Brazil) Eduardo Dischinger
← 2014 ·	Sport 1 Open	· 2016 →

The 2015 Sport 1 Open was a professional tennis tournament played on clay courts. It was the 23rd edition of the tournament which was part of the 2015 ATP Challenger Tour. It took place in Scheveningen, Netherlands between 20 and 26 July 2015.

== Singles main-draw entrants ==
=== Seeds ===
Country	Player	Rank^{1}	Seed
NED	Robin Haase	74	1
ESP	Daniel Muñoz de la Nava	109	2
GER	Jan-Lennard Struff	111	3
KAZ	Aleksandr Nedovyesov	115	4
ESP	Íñigo Cervantes	117	5
GEO	Nikoloz Basilashvili	120	6
RUS	Andrey Kuznetsov	121	7
SVK	Norbert Gombos	126	8

- ^{1} Rankings are as of July 13, 2015.

=== Other entrants ===
The following players received wildcards into the singles main draw:

- (Netherlands) Scott Griekspoor
- (Germany) Florian Mayer
- (Netherlands) Tim van Terheijden
- (Netherlands) Thomas Schoorel

The following players received entry from the qualifying draw:

- (Russia) Philipp Davydenko
- (Ukraine) Artem Smirnov
- (Netherlands) Roy de Valk
- (Russia) Alexey Vatutin

The following players entered received entry as lucky losers:

- (Belgium) Alexandre Folie
- (France) Alexandre Sidorenko

== Champions ==
=== Singles ===
- (Georgia (country)) Nikoloz Basilashvili def. (Russia) Andrey Kuznetsov 6–7^{(3–7)}, 7–6^{(7–4)}, 6–3

=== Doubles ===
- (Uruguay) Ariel Behar / (Brazil) Eduardo Dischinger def. (Russia) Aslan Karatsev / (Russia) Andrey Kuznetsov 0–0, retired
