= 2018 The Hague Open – Singles =

Singles
- 2018 The Hague Open

Final
- Champion: (Netherlands) Thiemo de Bakker
- Runner-up: (Germany) Yannick Maden
- Score: 6–2, 6–1

Events
Singles	Doubles
- The Hague Open

Guillermo García López was the defending champion but chose not to defend his title.

Thiemo de Bakker won the title after defeating Yannick Maden 6–2, 6–1 in the final.

== Seeds ==
1. (Germany) Yannick Maden (final)
2. (Czech Republic) Adam Pavlásek (first round)
3. (Germany) Mats Moraing (first round)
4. (Germany) Oscar Otte (quarterfinals)
5. (Italy) Matteo Donati (first round)
6. (Argentina) Carlos Berlocq (withdrew)
7. (Hungary) Attila Balázs (quarterfinals)
8. (France) Grégoire Barrère (first round)

== Draw ==
Key

- Q = Qualifier
- WC = Wild card
- LL = Lucky loser
- Alt = Alternate
- ITF = ITF entry
- PR = Protected ranking
- SR = Special ranking
- SE = Special exempt
- JE = Junior exempt
- JR = Junior Accelerator Programme entrant
- CO = College Accelerator Programme entrant
- NG = Next Gen Accelerator Program entrant
- w/o = Walkover
- r = Retired
- d = Defaulted

=== Finals ===
Semifinals
1	(Germany) Yannick Maden	6	6
(Czech Republic) Lukáš Rosol	3	4
Q	(Belgium) Kimmer Coppejans	1	4
WC	(Netherlands) Thiemo de Bakker	6	6

Final
1	(Germany) Yannick Maden	2	1
WC	(Netherlands) Thiemo de Bakker	6	6

=== Top half ===
First round
1	(Germany) Y Maden	7^{7}	6
Q	(Spain) A Davidovich Fokina	6^{4}	1
WC	(Netherlands) T van Rijthoven	3	3
LL	(Germany) Marvin Netuschil	6	6
(South Africa) L Harris	1	7^{7}	3
(Spain) N Kuhn	6	6^{1}	6
WC	(Netherlands) J Sels	3	6^{3}
7	(Hungary) A Balázs	6	7^{7}
3	(Germany) M Moraing	3	2
(Slovenia) B Rola	6	6
(Spain) B Zapata Miralles	7	6
Q	(France) E Benchetrit	5	1
(Czech Republic) L Rosol	6	6
(Czech Republic) V Šafránek	3	2
(Germany) T Kamke	6	3	7^{7}
LL	(Germany) Jeremy Jahn	4	6	6^{5}

Second round
1	(Germany) Y Maden	6	6
LL	(Germany) M Netuschil	3	1
(Spain) N Kuhn	3	4
7	(Hungary) A Balázs	6	6
(Slovenia) B Rola	6	6
(Spain) B Zapata Miralles	4	4
(Czech Republic) L Rosol	4	7^{7}	6
(Germany) T Kamke	6	6^{4}	4

Quarterfinals
1	(Germany) Y Maden	6	6^{7}	6
7	(Hungary) A Balázs	2	7^{9}	3
(Slovenia) B Rola	4	7^{8}	4
(Czech Republic) L Rosol	6	6^{6}	6

Semifinals
1	(Germany) Y Maden	6	6
(Czech Republic) L Rosol	3	4

=== Bottom half ===
First round
5	(Italy) M Donati	4	3
(France) A Hoang	6	6
(Netherlands) S Griekspoor	6	4	3
Q	(Belgium) K Coppejans	2	6	6
WC	(Netherlands) B van de Zandschulp	7	6
(Germany) J Choinski	5	2
(Portugal) G Oliveira	6^{5}	2
4	(Germany) O Otte	7^{7}	6
8	(France) G Barrère	5	5
(Germany) D Brown	7	7
(Italy) A Giannessi	3	6	6
(Chinese Taipei) T-h Yang	6	1	3
Q	(Netherlands) G Brouwer	3	0
(Belarus) U Ignatik	6	6
WC	(Netherlands) T de Bakker	6^{6}	7^{7}	6
2	(Czech Republic) A Pavlásek	7^{8}	6^{3}	3

Second round
(France) A Hoang	3	2
Q	(Belgium) K Coppejans	6	6
WC	(Netherlands) B van de Zandschulp	6^{1}	4
4	(Germany) O Otte	7^{7}	6
(Germany) D Brown	6	2	3
(Italy) A Giannessi	4	6	6
(Belarus) U Ignatik	4	6^{4}
WC	(Netherlands) T de Bakker	6	7^{7}

Quarterfinals
Q	(Belgium) K Coppejans	7	6
4	(Germany) O Otte	5	4
(Italy) A Giannessi	6	6^{7}	4
WC	(Netherlands) T de Bakker	3	7^{9}	6

Semifinals
Q	(Belgium) K Coppejans	1	4
WC	(Netherlands) T de Bakker	6	6
