= 2016 The Hague Open =

- Date: 25 – 31 July
- Edition: 24th
- Surface: Clay
- Location: Scheveningen, Netherlands

Champions

Singles
- (Netherlands) Robin Haase

Doubles
- (Netherlands) Wesley Koolhof / (Netherlands) Matwé Middelkoop
- The Hague Open

The 2016 The Hague Open was a professional tennis tournament played on clay courts. It was the 24th edition of the tournament and was part of the 2016 ATP Challenger Tour. It took place in Scheveningen, Netherlands between 25 and 31 July 2016.

== Singles main-draw entrants ==
=== Seeds ===
Country	Player	Rank^{1}	Seed
~~POR~~	~~Gastão Elias~~	~~72~~	~~1~~
ESP	Íñigo Cervantes	76	2
ARG	Facundo Bagnis	88	3
NED	Robin Haase	95	4
ARG	Renzo Olivo	109	5
NED	Igor Sijsling	115	6
CZE	Adam Pavlásek	116	7
ESP	Daniel Muñoz de la Nava	138	8
FRA	Constant Lestienne	170	9

- ^{1} Rankings are as of July 18, 2016.

=== Other entrants ===
The following players received wildcards into the singles main draw:

- (Netherlands) Jesse Huta Galung
- (Greece) Stefanos Tsitsipas
- (Netherlands) Tallon Griekspoor
- (Netherlands) Tim van Rijthoven

The following player received entry into the singles main draw with a protected ranking:

- (Netherlands) Boy Westerhof

The following players received entry from the qualifying draw:

- (Argentina) Juan Ignacio Galarza
- (Germany) George von Massow
- (Germany) Peter Torebko
- (France) Antoine Hoang

The following player entered as a lucky loser:

- (Austria) Gibril Diarra

== Champions ==
=== Singles ===
- (Netherlands) Robin Haase def. (Czech Republic) Adam Pavlásek, 6–4, 6–7^{(9–11)}, 6–2

=== Doubles ===
- (Netherlands) Wesley Koolhof / (Netherlands) Matwé Middelkoop def. (Netherlands) Tallon Griekspoor / (Netherlands) Tim van Rijthoven, 6–1, 3–6, [13–11]
