= 2018 The Hague Open =

- Date: 16–22 July
- Edition: 26th
- Surface: Clay
- Location: Scheveningen, Netherlands

Champions

Singles
- (Netherlands) Thiemo de Bakker

Doubles
- (Philippines) Ruben Gonzales / (United States) Nathaniel Lammons
- The Hague Open

The 2018 The Hague Open was a professional tennis tournament played on clay courts. It was the 26th edition of The Hague Open and was part of the 2018 ATP Challenger Tour. It took place in Scheveningen, Netherlands between 16 and 22 July 2018.

== Singles main-draw entrants ==
=== Seeds ===
Country	Player	Rank^{1}	Seed
GER	Yannick Maden	134	1
CZE	Adam Pavlásek	145	2
GER	Mats Moraing	156	3
GER	Oscar Otte	166	4
ITA	Matteo Donati	176	5
~~ARG~~	~~Carlos Berlocq~~	~~179~~	~~6~~
HUN	Attila Balázs	182	7
FRA	Grégoire Barrère	188	8

- ^{1} Rankings are as of 2 July 2018.

=== Other entrants ===
The following players received wildcards into the singles main draw:

- (Netherlands) Thiemo de Bakker
- (Netherlands) Jelle Sels
- (Netherlands) Botic van de Zandschulp
- (Netherlands) Tim van Rijthoven

The following players received entry from the qualifying draw:

- (France) Elliot Benchetrit
- (Netherlands) Gijs Brouwer
- (Belgium) Kimmer Coppejans
- (Spain) Alejandro Davidovich Fokina

The following players received entry as lucky losers:

- (Germany) Jeremy Jahn
- (Germany) Marvin Netuschil

== Champions ==
=== Singles ===
- (Netherlands) Thiemo de Bakker def. (Germany) Yannick Maden 6–2, 6–1.

=== Doubles ===
- (Philippines) Ruben Gonzales / (United States) Nathaniel Lammons def. (Venezuela) Luis David Martínez / (Portugal) Gonçalo Oliveira 6–3, 6–7^{(8–10)}, [10–5].
