= Rameez Junaid =

Australian tennis player

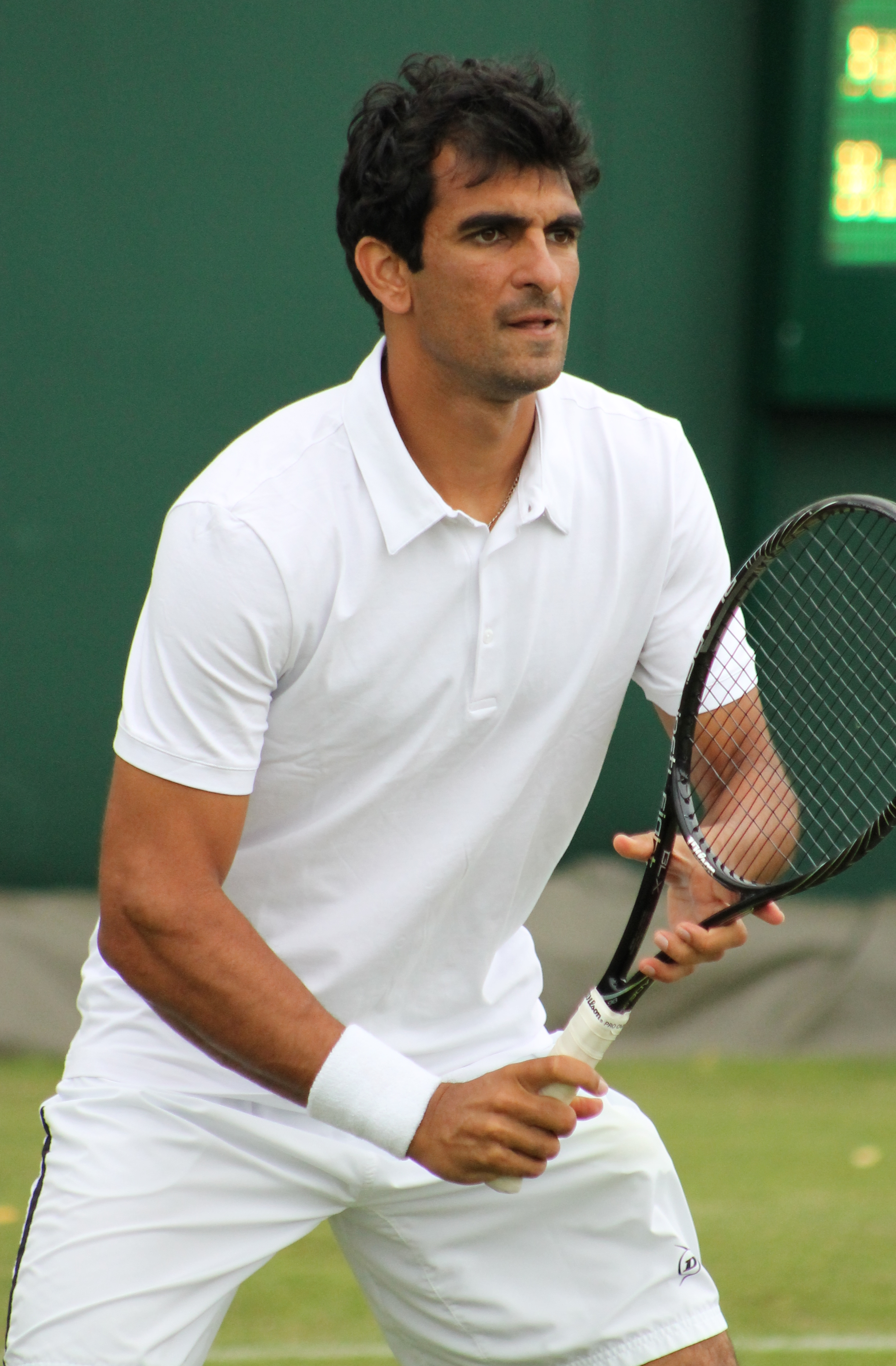
- Country (sports): Australia
- Residence: Melbourne, Victoria, Australia
- Born: 25 May 1981 (age 45) Faisalabad, Punjab, Pakistan
- Turned pro: 2000
- Retired: 2019
- Plays: Right-handed (one-handed backhand)
- Coach: Rainer Bopp
- Prize money: US $496,029

Singles
- Career record: 0–2
- Career titles: 0
- Highest ranking: No. 293 (20 October 2008)

Grand Slam singles results
- Australian Open: Q2 (2006)

Doubles
- Career record: 34–52
- Career titles: 1
- Highest ranking: No. 62 (20 April 2015)

Grand Slam doubles results
- Australian Open: 2R (2010)
- French Open: 1R (2014, 2015)
- Wimbledon: 2R (2009)
- US Open: 2R (2015)

Rameez Junaid (born 25 May 1981) is an Australian former professional tennis player of Pakistani descent. He has a career-high ATP singles ranking of world No. 293 achieved on 20 October 2008 and a best doubles ranking of No. 62, reached on 20 April 2015.

Junaid is based in Melbourne, Victoria. His doubles partners have included Philipp Marx, Adil Shamasdin and Aisam-ul-Haq Qureshi (in Dubai in 2007).

== ATP career finals ==
=== Doubles: 2 (1 title, 1 runner-up) ===
Legend Grand Slam Tournaments (0–0) ATP World Tour Finals (0–0) ATP World Tour Masters 1000 (0–0) ATP World Tour 500 Series (0–0) ATP World Tour 250 Series (1–1)	Finals by surface Hard (0–0) Clay (1–1) Grass (0–0) Carpet (0–0)

Outcome	No.	Date	Tournament	Surface	Partner	Opponents	Score
Loss	0–1	Jul 2014	Gstaad, Switzerland	Clay	(Slovakia) Michal Mertiňák	(Germany) Andre Begemann (Netherlands) Robin Haase	3–6, 4–6
Win	1–1	Apr 2015	Casablanca, Morocco	Clay	(Canada) Adil Shamasdin	(India) Rohan Bopanna (Romania) Florin Mergea	3–6, 6–2, [10–7]

== Challenger and Futures finals ==
=== Singles: 9 (3–6) ===
Legend (singles) ATP Challenger Tour (0–1) ITF Futures Tour (3–5)	Titles by surface Hard (2–4) Clay (1–2) Grass (0–0) Carpet (0–0)

Result	W–L	Date	Tournament	Tier	Surface	Opponent	Score
Win	1–0	Jun 2003	Canada F1, Mississauga	Futures	Hard	(Canada) Frank Dancevic	6–2, 3–6, 6–3
Loss	1–1	May 2005	Czech Republic F1, Most	Futures	Clay	(Czech Republic) Ladislav Chramosta	3–6, 2–6
Loss	1–2	Sep 2006	Great Britain F13, Nottingham	Futures	Hard	(Austria) Martin Fischer	3–6, 3–6
Loss	1–3	Mar 2007	Australia F3, Sale	Futures	Clay	(Greece) Vasilis Mazarakis	6–4, 2–6, 2–6
Loss	1–4	Apr 2007	United Arab Emirates F2, Dubai	Futures	Hard	(Republic of Ireland) Louk Sorensen	1–6, 2–6
Win	2–4	May 2007	Poland F1, Katowice	Futures	Clay	(Czech Republic) Jan Minář	2–6, 7–5, 6–2
Loss	2–5	Dec 2007	Tasmania, Australia	Challenger	Hard	(Australia) Alun Jones	0–6, 1–6
Loss	2–6	Mar 2008	New Zealand F1, Wellington	Futures	Hard	(Australia) Colin Ebelthite	2–6, 1–6
Win	3–6	Mar 2009	New Zealand F1, North Shore City	Futures	Hard	(Australia) Adam Feeney	6–3, 6–3

=== Doubles: 73 (37–36) ===
Legend (doubles) ATP Challenger Tour (26–29) ITF Futures Tour (11–7)	Titles by surface Hard (13–10) Clay (22–24) Grass (2–0) Carpet (0–2)

Result	W–L	Date	Tournament	Tier	Surface	Partner	Opponents	Score
Loss	0–1	Feb 2004	Bahrain F1, Manama	Futures	Hard	(United Kingdom) James Auckland	(Switzerland) Marco Chiudinelli (Italy) Uros Vico	4–6, 1–6
Loss	0–2	Feb 2005	Australia F1, Wollongong	Futures	Hard	(Poland) Adam Chadaj	(Australia) Adam Feeney (Australia) Joel Kerley	7–5, 3–6, [11–13]
Win	1–2	Apr 2005	Australia F4, Frankston	Futures	Clay	(Australia) Jay Salter	(Australia) Sadik Kadir (Australia) Robert Smeets	6–4, 7–6^{(7–4)}
Win	2–2	Jul 2005	Germany F6, Trier	Futures	Clay	(Germany) Markus Schiller	(Jamaica) Dustin Brown (Germany) Sebastian Rieschick	6–0, 6–4
Win	3–2	Sep 2005	France F14, Plaisir	Futures	Hard (i)	(Germany) Philipp Marx	(United States) Eric Butorac (United States) Chris Drake	7–5, 6–4
Win	4–2	Apr 2006	Great Britain F5, Bath	Futures	Hard (i)	(Germany) Tobias Clemens	(United Kingdom) James Auckland (United Kingdom) Richard Bloomfield	6–7^{(5–7)}, 6–2, 6–3
Loss	4–3	Apr 2006	France F7, Angers	Futures	Clay (i)	(Australia) Joseph Sirianni	(Belgium) Dominique Coene (Russia) Evgeny Korolev	2–6, 4–6
Loss	4–4	Jul 2006	Germany F7, Kassel	Futures	Clay	(Germany) Philipp Marx	(Germany) Gero Kretschmer (Australia) Clinton Thomson	6–7^{(5–7)}, 2–6
Loss	4–5	Sep 2006	Germany F15, Kempten	Futures	Clay	(Germany) Philipp Marx	(Austria) Martin Fischer (Austria) Philipp Oswald	3–6, 6–1, 6–7^{(1–7)}
Loss	4–6	Sep 2006	Great Britain F13, Nottingham	Futures	Hard	(Germany) David Klier	(United Kingdom) Neil Bamford (United Kingdom) Jim May	4–6, 6–7^{(5–7)}
Loss	4–7	Feb 2007	Tasmania, Australia	Challenger	Hard	(Australia) Joseph Sirianni	(Australia) Nathan Healey (Australia) Robert Smeets	6–7^{(7–9)}, 4–6
Win	5–7	Mar 2007	Australia F4, Lyneham	Futures	Clay	(Greece) Vasilis Mazarakis	(Australia) Carsten Ball (Australia) Dane Fernandez	6–3, 6–4
Win	6–7	Apr 2007	United Arab Emirates F1, Dubai	Futures	Hard	(Pakistan) Aisam Qureshi	(Canada) Pierre-Ludovic Duclos (Australia) Adam Feeney	6–4, 6–3
Win	7–7	Apr 2007	United Arab Emirates F2, Dubai	Futures	Hard	(Pakistan) Aisam Qureshi	(Canada) Pierre-Ludovic Duclos (Netherlands) Antal van der Duim	6–1, 6–3
Loss	7–8	May 2007	Poland F1, Katowice	Futures	Clay	(Greece) Vasilis Mazarakis	(Slovakia) Kamil Čapkovič (Slovakia) Marek Semjan	0–6, 5–7
Win	8–8	Sep 2007	Great Britain F18, Nottingham	Futures	Hard	(New Zealand) Daniel King-Turner	(United Kingdom) David Brewer (United Kingdom) Ian Flanagan	w/o
Win	9–8	Nov 2007	Australia F9, Happy Valley	Futures	Hard	(Australia) Joseph Sirianni	(Australia) Kaden Hensel (Australia) Adam Hubble	4–6, 6–4, [11–9]
Win	10–8	Dec 2007	Brisbane, Australia	Challenger	Hard	(New Zealand) Daniel King-Turner	(Australia) Carsten Ball (Australia) Adam Feeney	3–6, 7–6^{(7–3)}, [10–8]
Win	11–8	Feb 2008	Australia F2, Berri	Futures	Grass	(Australia) Raphael Durek	(Australia) Matthew Ebden (Australia) Dane Fernandez	w/o
Loss	11–9	Apr 2008	Busan, Korea, Rep.	Challenger	Hard	(Australia) Adam Feeney	(South Africa) Rik de Voest (Poland) Łukasz Kubot	3–6, 3–6
Win	12–9	Jul 2008	Lugano, Switzerland	Challenger	Clay	(Germany) Philipp Marx	(Argentina) Mariano Hood (Argentina) Eduardo Schwank	7–6^{(9–7)}, 4–6, [10–7]
Win	13–9	Jul 2008	Scheveningen, Netherlands	Challenger	Clay	(Germany) Philipp Marx	(Netherlands) Matwé Middelkoop (Netherlands) Melle van Gemerden	5–7, 6–2, [10–6]
Loss	13–10	Aug 2008	Geneva, Switzerland	Challenger	Clay	(Germany) Philipp Marx	(Austria) Daniel Köllerer (Germany) Frank Moser	6–7^{(5–7)}, 6–3, [8–10]
Win	14–10	Sep 2008	Alphen, Netherlands	Challenger	Clay	(Germany) Philipp Marx	(Netherlands) Bart Beks (Netherlands) Matwé Middelkoop	6–3, 6–2
Loss	14–11	Sep 2008	Ljubljana, Slovenia	Challenger	Clay	(Germany) Philipp Marx	(Argentina) Juan Pablo Brzezicki (Argentina) Mariano Hood	5–7, 6–7^{(4–7)}
Loss	14–12	Sep 2008	Banja Luka, Bosnia and Herzegovina	Challenger	Clay	(Germany) Philipp Marx	(Hungary) Attila Balázs (Israel) Amir Hadad	5–7, 2–6
Win	15–12	Apr 2009	Athens, Greece	Challenger	Clay	(Germany) Philipp Marx	(Netherlands) Jesse Huta Galung (Portugal) Rui Machado	6–4, 6–3
Win	16–12	May 2009	Karlsruhe, Germany	Challenger	Clay	(Germany) Philipp Marx	(Poland) Tomasz Bednarek (Pakistan) Aisam Qureshi	7–5, 6–4
Win	17–12	May 2010	Busan, Korea, Rep.	Challenger	Hard	(Austria) Alexander Peya	(Canada) Pierre-Ludovic Duclos (Chinese Taipei) Yang Tsung-hua	6–4, 7–5
Win	18–12	Jun 2010	Fürth, Germany	Challenger	Clay	(Jamaica) Dustin Brown	(Germany) Martin Emmrich (Australia) Joseph Sirianni	6–3, 6–1
Loss	18–13	Jul 2010	Scheveningen, Netherlands	Challenger	Clay	(Germany) Philipp Marx	(Brazil) Franco Ferreiro (India) Harsh Mankad	4–6, 6–3, [7–10]
Loss	18–14	Sep 2010	Szczecin, Poland	Challenger	Clay	(Germany) Philipp Marx	(Jamaica) Dustin Brown (Netherlands) Rogier Wassen	4–6, 5–7
Win	19–14	Sep 2010	İzmir, Turkey	Challenger	Hard	(Germany) Frank Moser	(United Kingdom) Jamie Delgado (United Kingdom) Jonathan Marray	6–2, 6–4
Win	20–14	Oct 2010	Seoul, Korea, Rep.	Challenger	Hard	(Germany) Frank Moser	(Canada) Vasek Pospisil (Canada) Adil Shamasdin	6–3, 6–4
Loss	20–15	Nov 2010	Salzburg, Austria	Challenger	Hard (i)	(Germany) Frank Moser	(Austria) Alexander Peya (Austria) Martin Slanar	6–7^{(1–7)}, 3–6
Win	21–15	May 2011	Sweden F3, Båstad	Futures	Clay	(Spain) Óscar Sabate-Bretos	(Sweden) Patrik Brydolf (Sweden) Milos Sekulic	3–6, 7–6^{(8–6)}, [10–4]
Win	22–15	Jun 2011	Fürth, Germany	Challenger	Clay	(Germany) Frank Moser	(Chile) Jorge Aguilar (Ecuador) Julio César Campozano	6–2, 6–7^{(2–7)}, [10–6]
Loss	22–16	Jul 2011	Scheveningen, Netherlands	Challenger	Clay	(Australia) Sadik Kadir	(Australia) Colin Ebelthite (Australia) Adam Feeney	4–6, 7–6^{(7–5)}, [7–10]
Win	23–16	Apr 2012	Saint Brieuc, France	Challenger	Clay (i)	(Lithuania) Laurynas Grigelis	(France) Stéphane Robert (France) Laurent Rochette	1–6, 6–2, [10–6]
Loss	23–17	Apr 2012	Napoli, Italy	Challenger	Clay	(Slovakia) Igor Zelenay	(Lithuania) Laurynas Grigelis (Italy) Alessandro Motti	4–6, 4–6
Loss	23–18	Jun 2012	Fürth, Germany	Challenger	Clay	(India) Purav Raja	(Spain) Arnau Brugués Davi (Portugal) João Sousa	5–7, 7–6^{(7–4)}, [9–11]
Loss	23–19	Jul 2012	Scheveningen, Netherlands	Challenger	Clay	(Germany) Simon Stadler	(Netherlands) Antal van der Duim (Netherlands) Boy Westerhof	4–6, 7–5, [7–10]
Win	24–19	Jul 2012	Poznań, Poland	Challenger	Clay	(Germany) Simon Stadler	(Australia) Adam Hubble (Australia) Nima Roshan	6–3, 6–4
Win	25–19	Sep 2012	Alphen, Netherlands	Challenger	Clay	(Germany) Simon Stadler	(Germany) Simon Greul (Germany) Bastian Knittel	4–6, 6–1, [10–5]
Loss	25–20	Oct 2012	Tashkent, Uzbekistan	Challenger	Hard	(Germany) Frank Moser	(Germany) Andre Begemann (Germany) Martin Emmrich	7–6^{(7–2)}, 6–7^{(2–7)}, [8–10]
Loss	25–21	Nov 2012	Ortisei, Italy	Challenger	Carpet	(Germany) Michael Kohlmann	(Slovakia) Karol Beck (South Africa) Rik de Voest	3–6, 4–6
Loss	25–22	Apr 2013	Rome, Italy	Challenger	Clay	(Germany) Martin Emmrich	(Germany) Andreas Beck (Austria) Martin Fischer	6–7^{(2–7)}, 0–6
Win	26–22	Jun 2013	Fürth, Germany	Challenger	Clay	(Australia) Colin Ebelthite	(United States) Christian Harrison (New Zealand) Michael Venus	6–4, 7–5
Win	27–22	Aug 2013	Liberec, Czech Republic	Challenger	Clay	(Germany) Tim Pütz	(Australia) Colin Ebelthite (Chinese Taipei) Lee Hsin-han	6–0, 6–2
Win	28–22	Aug 2013	Meerbusch, Germany	Challenger	Clay	(Germany) Frank Moser	(Germany) Dustin Brown (Germany) Philipp Marx	6–3, 7–6^{(7–4)}
Win	29–22	Sep 2013	Como, Italy	Challenger	Clay	(Slovakia) Igor Zelenay	(Italy) Marco Crugnola (Italy) Stefano Ianni	7–5, 7–6^{(7–2)}
Win	30–22	Sep 2013	Sibiu, Romania	Challenger	Clay	(Austria) Philipp Oswald	(United Kingdom) Jamie Delgado (Australia) Jordan Kerr	6–4, 6–4
Loss	30–23	May 2014	Heilbronn, Germany	Challenger	Clay	(Netherlands) Jesse Huta Galung	(Germany) Andre Begemann (Germany) Tim Pütz	3–6, 3–6
Win	31–23	Jun 2014	Nottingham, Great Britain	Challenger	Grass	(New Zealand) Michael Venus	(Belgium) Ruben Bemelmans (Japan) Go Soeda	4–6, 7–6^{(7–1)}, [10–6]
Loss	31–24	Jul 2014	Braunschweig, Germany	Challenger	Clay	(Slovakia) Michal Mertiňák	(Sweden) Andreas Siljeström (Slovakia) Igor Zelenay	5–7, 4–6
Loss	31–25	Mar 2015	Cherbourg, France	Challenger	Hard (i)	(Canada) Adil Shamasdin	(Germany) Andreas Beck (Czech Republic) Jan Mertl	2–6, 6–3, [3–10]
Loss	31–26	Apr 2015	Raanana, Israel	Challenger	Hard	(Canada) Adil Shamasdin	(Croatia) Mate Pavić (New Zealand) Michael Venus	1–6, 4–6
Win	32–26	Aug 2015	Meerbusch, Germany	Challenger	Clay	(Germany) Dustin Brown	(Netherlands) Wesley Koolhof (Netherlands) Matwé Middelkoop	6–4, 7–5
Loss	32–27	Oct 2015	Mons, Belgium	Challenger	Hard (i)	(Slovakia) Igor Zelenay	(Belgium) Ruben Bemelmans (Germany) Philipp Petzschner	3–6, 1–6
Win	33–27	Apr 2016	Saint Brieuc, France	Challenger	Hard (i)	(Sweden) Andreas Siljeström	(United States) James Cerretani (Netherlands) Antal van der Duim	5–7, 7–6^{(7–4)}, [10–8]
Loss	33–28	Apr 2016	Turin, Italy	Challenger	Clay	(Poland) Mateusz Kowalczyk	(Slovakia) Andrej Martin (Chile) Hans Podlipnik Castillo	6–4, 6–7^{(3–7)}, [10–12]
Loss	33–29	Apr 2017	Francavilla, Italy	Challenger	Clay	(Germany) Kevin Krawietz	(Austria) Julian Knowle (Slovakia) Igor Zelenay	6–3, 2–6, [7–10]
Loss	33–30	May 2017	Ostrava, Czech Republic	Challenger	Clay	(Czech Republic) Lukáš Rosol	(India) Jeevan Nedunchezhiyan (Croatia) Franko Škugor	3–6, 2–6
Loss	33–31	Jul 2017	Marburg, Germany	Challenger	Clay	(South Africa) Ruan Roelofse	(Argentina) Máximo González (Brazil) Fabrício Neis	3–6, 6–7^{(4–7)}
Win	34–31	Mar 2018	Shenzhen, China	Challenger	Hard	(Chinese Taipei) Hsieh Cheng-peng	(Ukraine) Denys Molchanov (Slovakia) Igor Zelenay	7–6^{(7–3)}, 6–3
Win	35–31	May 2018	Heilbronn, Germany	Challenger	Clay	(Netherlands) David Pel	(Germany) Kevin Krawietz (Germany) Andreas Mies	6–2, 2–6, [10–7]
Loss	35–32	Jun 2018	Blois, France	Challenger	Clay	(Chinese Taipei) Hsieh Cheng-peng	(Brazil) Fabrício Neis (Spain) David Vega Hernández	6–7^{(4–7)}, 1–6
Win	36–32	Sep 2018	Istanbul, Turkey	Challenger	Hard	(India) Purav Raja	(Kazakhstan) Timur Khabibulin (Ukraine) Vladyslav Manafov	7–6^{(7–4)}, 4–6, [10–7]
Loss	36–33	Sep 2018	Biella, Italy	Challenger	Clay	(India) Purav Raja	(Brazil) Fabrício Neis (Spain) David Vega Hernández	4–6, 4–6
Win	37–33	Oct 2018	Florence, Italy	Challenger	Clay	(Netherlands) David Pel	(Italy) Filippo Baldi (Italy) Salvatore Caruso	7–5, 3–6, [10–7]
Loss	37–34	Oct 2018	Barcelona, Spain	Challenger	Clay	(Netherlands) David Pel	(Brazil) Marcelo Demoliner (Spain) David Vega Hernández	6–7^{(3–7)}, 3–6
Loss	37–35	Oct 2018	Ismaning, Germany	Challenger	Carpet (i)	(Netherlands) David Pel	(India) Purav Raja (Croatia) Antonio Šančić	7–5, 4–6, [5–10]
Loss	37–36	Apr 2019	Murcia, Spain	Challenger	Clay	(Belarus) Andrei Vasilevski	(New Zealand) Marcus Daniell (Spain) David Marrero	4–6, 4–6

== Grand Slam doubles performance timeline ==
Key
W	F	SF	QF	#R	RR	Q#	DNQ	A	NH

(W) winner; (F) finalist; (SF) semifinalist; (QF) quarterfinalist; (#R) rounds 4, 3, 2, 1; (RR) round-robin stage; (Q#) qualification round; (DNQ) did not qualify; (A) absent; (NH) not held; (SR) strike rate (events won / competed); (W–L) win–loss record.
To avoid confusion and double counting, these charts are updated at the conclusion of a tournament or when the player's participation has ended.

Tournament	2006	2007	2008	2009	2010	2011	2012	2013	2014	2015	2016	SR	W–L
Australian Open	1R	A	A	A	2R	1R	A	A	1R	1R	1R	0 / 6	1–6
French Open	A	A	A	A	A	A	A	A	1R	1R	A	0 / 2	0–2
Wimbledon	A	A	A	2R	A	A	Q1	1R	Q1	1R	Q2	0 / 3	1–3
US Open	A	A	A	A	A	A	A	A	1R	2R	A	0 / 2	1–2
Win–loss	0–1	0–0	0–0	1–1	1–1	0–1	0–0	0–1	0–3	1–4	0-1	0 / 13	3–13
