= Eduardo Dischinger =

Brazilian tennis player

- Country (sports): Brazil
- Born: May 18, 1992 (age 33)
- Plays: Right-handed (two-handed backhand)
- Prize money: $73,365

Singles
- Career record: 0–0
- Career titles: 0
- Highest ranking: No. 540 (29 April 2013)

Grand Slam singles results
- US Open Junior: Q1(2009)

Doubles
- Career record: 0–0
- Career titles: 1 Challenger, 7 ITF
- Highest ranking: No. 248 (31 August 2015)

Eduardo Moreira Dischinger (born 18 May 1992) is a Brazilian tennis player.

Dischinger has a career high ATP singles ranking of No. 540 achieved on 29 April 2013 and a career high ATP doubles ranking of No. 248 achieved on 31 August 2015. He has won 7 ITF doubles titles.

Dischinger won his first ATP Challenger title at the 2015 Sport 1 Open in the doubles event partnering Ariel Behar.
