= Stephan Fransen =

Dutch tennis player

- Country (sports): Netherlands
- Residence: The Hague
- Born: 8 August 1988 (age 36); The Hague, Netherlands
- Plays: Right Handed (Double Handed Backhand)
- Prize money: $43,855

Singles
- Career record: 1–6
- Career titles: 0
- Highest ranking: No. 817 (7 June 2010)
- Current ranking: No. 1076

Doubles
- Career record: 25–24
- Career titles: 0
- Highest ranking: No. 163 (18 November 2013)
- Current ranking: No. 164
- Last updated on: 1 January 2014.

Stephan Fransen (born 8 August 1988) is a Dutch tennis player playing on the ATP Challenger Tour. On 7 June 2010, he reached his highest ATP singles ranking of 817 and his highest doubles ranking of 163 achieved on 18 November 2013.

== Tour titles ==
Legend
Grand Slam (0)
ATP Masters Series (0)
ATP Tour (0)
Challengers (1)

=== Doubles ===
Result	No.	Date	Tournament	Surface	Partner	Opponents	Score
Loss	1.	16 September 2012	Seville	Clay	(Netherlands) Jesse Huta Galung	(Serbia) Nikola Ćirić (Serbia) Boris Pašanski	7–5, 4–6, [6–10]
Loss	2.	28 July 2013	Oberstaufen	Clay	(New Zealand) Artem Sitak	(Germany) Dominik Meffert (Austria) Philipp Oswald	1–6, 6–3, [12–14]
Loss	3.	15 September 2013	Seville	Clay	(Netherlands) Wesley Koolhof	(Italy) Alessandro Motti (France) Stéphane Robert	5–7, 5–7
Win	4.	17 November 2013	Guayaquil	Clay	(Netherlands) Wesley Koolhof	(Moldova) Roman Borvanov (Germany) Alexander Satschko	1–6, 6–2, [10–5]
