= Peter Torebko =

German tennis player

- Country (sports): Germany
- Residence: Wesel, Germany
- Born: 10 February 1988 (age 37) Bytom, Poland
- Height: 1.85 m (6 ft 1 in)
- Turned pro: 2008
- Plays: Right-handed (Double-handed backhand)
- Prize money: US$253,229

Singles
- Career record: 0–2 (in ATP Tour and Grand Slam main draw matches
- Career titles: 0
- Highest ranking: No. 182 (16 July 2012)

Grand Slam singles results
- Australian Open: Q2 (2015)
- French Open: Q1 (2012)
- Wimbledon: Q3 (2012)
- US Open: Q1 (2012)

Doubles
- Career record: 0–0
- Career titles: 0
- Highest ranking: No. 421 (17 July 2017)
- Current ranking: No. 2,113 (10 November 2025)
- Last updated on: 10 November 2025.

Peter Torebko (born 10 February 1988) is a German tennis player. He competes mainly on the ATP Challenger Tour and the ITF Men's Circuit. On 16 July 2012, he reached his highest ATP singles ranking of world No. 182.

Torebko made his ATP World Tour debut at the 2011 Romanian Open, losing to Igor Andreev in the first round.

== Singles performance timeline ==
Key
W	F	SF	QF	#R	RR	Q#	DNQ	A	NH

(W) winner; (F) finalist; (SF) semifinalist; (QF) quarterfinalist; (#R) rounds 4, 3, 2, 1; (RR) round-robin stage; (Q#) qualification round; (DNQ) did not qualify; (A) absent; (NH) not held; (SR) strike rate (events won / competed); (W–L) win–loss record.
To avoid confusion and double counting, these charts are updated at the conclusion of a tournament or when the player's participation has ended.

Tournament	2008	2009	2010	2011	2012	2013	2014	2015	2016	2017	2018	2019	2020	2021	W–L
Grand Slam tournaments
Australian Open	A	A	A	A	Q1	A	A	Q2	A	A	A	A	A	A	0–0
French Open	A	A	A	A	Q1	A	A	A	A	A	A	A	A	A	0–0
Wimbledon	A	A	A	A	Q3	A	A	A	A	A	A	A	A	A	0–0
US Open	A	A	A	A	Q1	A	A	A	A	A	A	A	A	A	0–0
Career statistics
Tournaments	0	0	0	1	0	0	0	0	0	0	0	1	0	0	2
Overall win–loss	0–0	0–0	0–0	0–1	0–0	0–0	0–0	0–0	0–0	0–0	0–0	0–1	0–0	0–0	0–2
Year-end ranking	830	752	513	238	278	445	243	425	370	541	491	337	353		
