= Colin Ebelthite =

Australian tennis player

- Country (sports): Australia
- Born: 27 November 1984 (age 40); Adelaide, Australia
- Height: 179 cm (5 ft 10 in)
- Turned pro: 2000
- Retired: 2013
- Prize money: $201,506

Singles
- Career record: 0–1
- Career titles: 0
- Highest ranking: No. 209 (23 June 2008)

Grand Slam singles results
- Australian Open: 1R (2009)
- Wimbledon: Q1 (2008)
- US Open: Q1 (2008)

Doubles
- Career record: 7–9
- Career titles: 0
- Highest ranking: No. 98 (17 September 2012)

Grand Slam doubles results
- Australian Open: 3R (2011)
- Wimbledon: 1R (2012)

Colin Ebelthite (born 27 November 1984) is a former Australian professional tennis player.

Ebelthite's highest ATP singles ranking is World 209, which he reached on 23 June 2008. His career high ranking in doubles was at 98, set on 17 September 2012. The South Australian won three Futures titles including Sorrento (WA), Perth and Wellington. Ebelthite joined the Australian Institute of Sport (AIS) Pro Tour squad in January. His impressive run saw his ranking rocket to a career high 230, an outstanding feat given only sixteen months before he was ranked No.703 in the world. While qualifying for his grand slam he defeated Australian rising talent Bernard Tomic. Ebelthite competed in the Australian Open in 2009 where he was knocked out in the first round by Andreas Beck.

== Grand Slam doubles timeline ==
Key
W	F	SF	QF	#R	RR	Q#	DNQ	A	NH

(W) winner; (F) finalist; (SF) semifinalist; (QF) quarterfinalist; (#R) rounds 4, 3, 2, 1; (RR) round-robin stage; (Q#) qualification round; (DNQ) did not qualify; (A) absent; (NH) not held; (SR) strike rate (events won / competed); (W–L) win–loss record.

Tournament	2008	2009	2010	2011	2012	2013	W–L
Australian Open	1R	1R	A	3R	2R	A	3–4
French Open	A	A	A	A	A	A	0–0
Wimbledon	A	A	A	A	1R	Q1	0–1
US Open	A	A	A	A	A	A	0–0
