= Jesse Huta Galung =

Dutch tennis player

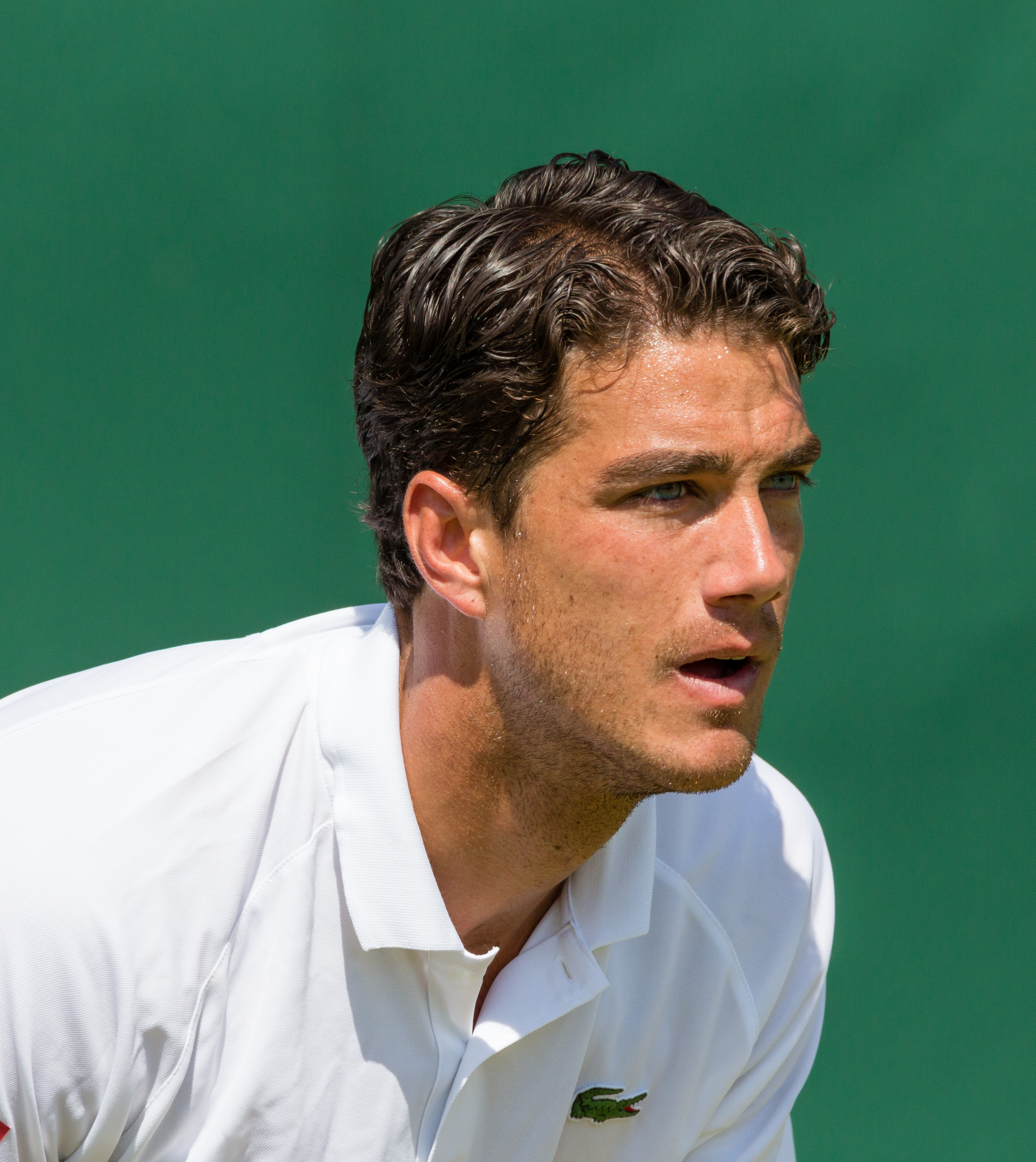
- Country (sports): Netherlands
- Residence: Poortugaal, Netherlands
- Born: 6 October 1985 (age 41) Haarlem, The Netherlands
- Height: 1.88 m (6 ft 2 in)
- Turned pro: 2004
- Retired: 2016
- Plays: Right-handed (one-handed backhand)
- Prize money: US $946,839

Singles
- Career record: 9–33 (at ATP Tour level, Grand Slam level, and in Davis Cup)
- Career titles: 0
- Highest ranking: No. 91 (10 February 2014)

Grand Slam singles results
- Australian Open: 1R (2012, 2014)
- French Open: 1R (2008)
- Wimbledon: 1R (2010)
- US Open: 1R (2011)

Doubles
- Career record: 15–22 (at ATP Tour level, Grand Slam level, and in Davis Cup)
- Career titles: 1
- Highest ranking: No. 63 (19 May 2014)

Grand Slam doubles results
- Australian Open: 1R (2014, 2015)
- Wimbledon: 1R (2014)
- US Open: 1R (2014)

Grand Slam mixed doubles results
- Wimbledon: 2R (2014)

Jesse Huta Galung (Dutch pronunciation: [ˈjɛsə ˈɦutaː ɡaːˈluŋ]; born 6 October 1985) is a former professional Dutch tennis player. Huta Galung has a career-high ATP singles ranking of World No. 91, achieved on 18 February 2014 and a career-high ATP doubles ranking of World No. 63, achieved on 19 May 2014.

== Performance timelines ==
Key
W	F	SF	QF	#R	RR	Q#	DNQ	A	NH

(W) winner; (F) finalist; (SF) semifinalist; (QF) quarterfinalist; (#R) rounds 4, 3, 2, 1; (RR) round-robin stage; (Q#) qualification round; (DNQ) did not qualify; (A) absent; (NH) not held; (SR) strike rate (events won / competed); (W–L) win–loss record.

=== Singles ===
Tournament	2008	2009	2010	2011	2012	2013	2014	2015	SR	W–L	Win %
Grand Slam tournaments
Australian Open	Q2	Q1	A	Q2	1R	Q1	1R	Q1	0 / 2	0–2	0%
French Open	1R	Q2	A	Q1	Q1	Q2	Q3	A	0 / 1	0–1	0%
Wimbledon	A	A	1R	A	A	A	A	Q1	0 / 1	0–1	0%
US Open	Q3	A	A	1R	Q1	Q1	Q2	A	0 / 1	0–1	0%
Win–loss	0–1	0–0	0–1	0–1	0–1	0–0	0–1	0–0	0 / 5	0–5	0%
ATP Tour Masters 1000
Indian Wells Masters	Q1	A	A	A	A	A	A	A	0 / 0	0–0	–
Miami Open	Q1	A	A	A	A	A	Q1	A	0 / 0	0–0	–
Monte-Carlo Masters	A	A	A	A	A	1R	A	A	0 / 1	0–1	0%
Win–loss	0–0	0–0	0–0	0–0	0–0	0–1	0–0	0–0	0 / 1	0–1	0%

=== Doubles ===
Tournament	2014	2015	W–L
Grand Slam tournaments
Australian Open	1R	1R	0–2
French Open	A	A	0–0
Wimbledon	1R	A	0–1
US Open	1R	A	0–1
Win–loss	0–3	0–1	0–4

== ATP career finals ==
=== Doubles: 3 (1 title, 2 runner-ups) ===
Legend Grand Slam tournaments (0–0) ATP World Tour Finals (0–0) ATP World Tour Masters 1000 (0–0) ATP World Tour 500 Series (1–1) ATP World Tour 250 Series (0–1)	Titles by surface Hard (0–1) Clay (1–1) Grass (0–0)	Titles by setting Outdoor (1–1) Indoor (0–1)

Result	W–L	Date	Tournament	Tier	Surface	Partner	Opponents	Score
Loss	0–1	Jul 2008	Dutch Open, Netherlands	250 Series	Clay	(Netherlands) Igor Sijsling	(Czech Republic) František Čermák (Netherlands) Rogier Wassen	5–7, 5–7
Loss	0–2	Feb 2013	Rotterdam Open, Netherlands	500 Series	Hard (i)	(Netherlands) Thiemo de Bakker	(Sweden) Robert Lindstedt (Serbia) Nenad Zimonjić	7–5, 3–6, [8–10]
Win	1–2	Apr 2014	Barcelona Open, Spain	500 Series	Clay	(France) Stéphane Robert	(Canada) Daniel Nestor (Serbia) Nenad Zimonjić	6–3, 6–3

== ATP Challenger and ITF Futures finals ==
=== Singles: 37 (29–8) ===
Legend ATP Challenger (10–2) ITF Futures (19–6)	Finals by surface Hard (7–1) Clay (19–6) Grass (0–0) Carpet (3–1)

Result	W–L	Date	Tournament	Tier	Surface	Opponent	Score
Win	1–0	May 2004	Spain F7, Lleida	Futures	Clay	(Croatia) Tomislav Perić	7–6^{(7–3)}, 6–3
Loss	1–1	Aug 2004	Spain F16, Denia	Futures	Clay	(Spain) Javier Genaro-Martinez	6–7^{(5–7)}, 6–2, 5–7
Win	2–1	Aug 2005	Germany F12, Unterfohring	Futures	Clay	(Germany) Dominik Meffert	7–6^{(7–3)}, 0–6, 6–3
Win	3–1	Sep 2005	Netherlands F3, Alphen aan den Rijn	Futures	Clay	(Austria) Max Raditschnigg	7–6^{(7–2)}, 7–6^{(7–4)}
Win	4–1	Sep 2005	Netherlands F4, Enschede	Futures	Clay	(Germany) Torsten Popp	6–0, 2–0 ret.
Loss	4–2	Oct 2005	Spain F27, El Ejido	Futures	Hard	(Spain) David Marrero	3–6, 4–6
Win	5–2	Mar 2006	China F3, Shenzhen	Futures	Hard	(Japan) Go Soeda	6–3, 6–2
Win	6–2	Sep 2006	Netherlands F7, Almere	Futures	Clay	(Netherlands) Antal van der Duim	6–2, 6–3
Loss	6–3	Aug 2007	Geneva, Switzerland	Challenger	Clay	(Russia) Yuri Schukin	3–6, 2–6
Win	7–3	Sep 2007	Alphen, Netherlands	Challenger	Clay	(France) Augustin Gensse	6–4, 6–7^{(9–11)}, 7–6^{(7–4)}
Win	8–3	Jul 2008	Scheveningen, Netherlands	Challenger	Clay	(Argentina) Diego Hartfield	6–3, 6–4
Win	9–3	Mar 2009	Caltanissetta, Italy	Challenger	Clay	(Netherlands) Thiemo de Bakker	6–2, 6–3
Win	10–3	Nov 2009	Turkey F11, Antalya	Futures	Clay	(Romania) Andrei Mlendea	6–1, 6–1
Win	11–3	Nov 2009	Turkey F12, Antalya	Futures	Clay	(Romania) Andrei Mlendea	3–0 ret.
Win	12–3	Dec 2009	Malaysia F6, Kuala Lumpur	Futures	Hard	(Croatia) Marin Bradarić	7–6^{(7–2)}, 6–3
Win	13–3	Jan 2010	Germany F1, Schwieberdingen	Futures	Carpet	(Luxembourg) Gilles Müller	6–2, 6–7^{(4–7)}, 6–3
Loss	13–4	Jan 2010	Germany F3, Kaarst	Futures	Carpet	(Ukraine) Sergey Bubka	1–6, 4–6
Win	14–4	Mar 2010	Turkey F1, Antalya	Futures	Clay	(France) Éric Prodon	7–6^{(7–4)}, 6–0
Loss	14–5	Jul 2010	Netherlands F4, Breda	Futures	Clay	(Netherlands) Thomas Schoorel	2–6, 6–7^{(5–7)}
Win	15–5	Aug 2010	Trani, Italy	Challenger	Clay	(Italy) Filippo Volandri	7–6^{(7–3)}, 6–3
Win	16–5	Sep 2010	Alphen, Netherlands	Challenger	Clay	(Netherlands) Thomas Schoorel	6–7, 6–4, 6–4
Win	17–5	Jan 2012	Germany F3, Kaarst	Futures	Carpet	(Czech Republic) Jan Mertl	6–1, 3–2 ret.
Win	18–5	Sep 2012	Netherlands F6, Rotterdam	Futures	Clay	(France) Axel Michon	6–2, 7–6^{(7–3)}
Win	19–5	Oct 2012	Germany F20, Bad Salzdetfurth	Futures	Carpet	(Germany) Sami Reinwein	6–4, 6–4
Win	20–5	Oct 2012	Turkey F41, Antalya	Futures	Hard	(Kazakhstan) Evgeny Korolev	6–3, 6–3
Win	21–5	Mar 2013	Cherbourg, France	Challenger	Hard	(France) Vincent Millot	6–1, 6–3
Win	22–5	Apr 2013	Saint-Brieuc, France	Challenger	Hard	(France) Kenny de Schepper	7–6, 4–6, 7–6
Win	23–5	Jul 2013	Scheveningen, Netherlands	Challenger	Clay	(Netherlands) Robin Haase	6–3, 6–7^{(2–7)}, 6–4
Win	24–5	Jul 2013	Tampere, Finland	Challenger	Clay	(France) Maxime Teixeira	6–4, 6–3
Loss	24–6	Aug 2013	Meerbusch, Germany	Challenger	Clay	(Czech Republic) Jan Hájek	3–6, 4–6
Win	25–6	Sep 2014	Alphen, Netherlands	Challenger	Clay	(Spain) Daniel Muñoz de la Nava	6–3, 6–4
Win	26–6	Jul 2015	Netherlands F3, Zeeland	Futures	Clay	(Switzerland) Yann Marti	7–5, 2–6, 6–3
Loss	26–7	Aug 2015	Netherlands F5, Oldenzaal	Futures	Clay	(Italy) Gianluigi Quinzi	5–7, 0–2 ret.
Win	27–7	Feb 2016	Portugal F1, Vale do Lobo	Futures	Hard	(Spain) Roberto Ortega Olmedo	6–4, 5–7, 6–2
Win	28–7	Mar 2016	Portugal F2, Faro	Futures	Hard	(Germany) Oscar Otte	1–6, 6–4, 6–2
Win	29–7	Jul 2016	Netherlands F3, Middelburg	Futures	Clay	(Netherlands) Jelle Sels	6–3, 6–2
Loss	29–8	Sep 2016	Netherlands F7, Schoonhoven	Futures	Clay	(Netherlands) Botic Van de Zandschulp	walkover

=== Doubles: 23 (6–17) ===
Legend ATP Challenger (1–10) ITF Futures (5–7)	Finals by surface Hard (4–3) Clay (1–13) Grass (0–1) Carpet (1–0)

Result	W–L	Date	Tournament	Tier	Surface	Partner	Opponents	Score
Loss	0–1	Sep 2005	Netherlands F4, Enschede	Futures	Clay	(Netherlands) Igor Sijsling	(Germany) Sascha Kloer (Germany) Ralph Grambow	walkover
Loss	0–2	Oct 2005	France F19, Rodez	Futures	Hard	(Netherlands) Melvyn op der Heijde	(France) Xavier Audbouy (France) Jean-François Bachelot	6–7^{(3–7)}, 4–6
Win	1–2	Mar 2006	China F3, Shenzhen	Futures	Hard	(Netherlands) Antal van der Duim	(Chinese Taipei) Lee Hsin-han (Hong Kong) Hiu-Tung Yu	7–5, 6–1
Win	2–2	Mar 2006	China F5, Guangzhou	Futures	Hard	(United States) James Cerretani	(China) Zhe Li (China) Xue Feng	4–6, 6–3, 7–6^{(7–3)}
Loss	2–3	Sep 2006	Netherlands F7, Almere	Futures	Clay	(Netherlands) Igor Sijsling	(Netherlands) Thiemo de Bakker (Netherlands) Antal van der Duim	6–4, 1–6, 4–6
Loss	2–4	Jul 2007	Manchester, United Kingdom	Challenger	Grass	(Sweden) Michael Ryderstedt	(India) Rohan Bopanna (Pakistan) Aisam Qureshi	6–4, 3–6, [5–10]
Win	3–4	Jun 2008	Netherlands F3, Breda	Futures	Clay	(Netherlands) Matwé Middelkoop	(Belgium) Niels Desein (Belgium) Jeroen Masson	3–6, 6–3, [10–8]
Loss	3–5	Apr 2009	Athens, Greece	Challenger	Clay	(Portugal) Rui Machado	(Australia) Rameez Junaid (Germany) Philipp Marx	4–6, 3–6
Loss	3–6	Aug 2009	Manerbio, Italy	Challenger	Clay	(Switzerland) Yves Allegro	(Italy) Alessio di Mauro (Italy) Simone Vagnozzi	4–6, 6–3, [4–10]
Win	4–6	Dec 2009	Malaysia F6, Kuala Lumpur	Futures	Hard	(Netherlands) Miliaan Niesten	(Belarus) Sergey Betov (Belarus) Dzmitry Zhyrmont	6–2, 4–6, [10–6]
Win	5–6	Jan 2010	Germany F1, Schwieberdingen	Futures	Carpet	(Netherlands) Miliaan Niesten	(Germany) Marcel Zimmermann (Germany) Phillip Regnat	1–6, 7–6^{(8–6)}, [10–4]
Loss	5–7	Mar 2010	Turkey F1, Antalya	Futures	Clay	(France) Éric Prodon	(Austria) Marco Mirnegg (Austria) Herbert Wiltschnig	1–6, 2–6
Loss	5–8	Sep 2012	Seville, Spain	Challenger	Clay	(Netherlands) Stephan Fransen	(Serbia) Nikola Ćirić (Serbia) Boris Pashanski	7–5, 4–6, [6–10]
Loss	5–9	Apr 2013	Saint-Brieuc, France	Challenger	Hard	(Russia) Konstantin Kravchuk	(Poland) Tomasz Bednarek (Sweden) Andreas Siljeström	3–6, 6–4, [7–10]
Loss	5–10	Jun 2013	Marburg, Germany	Challenger	Clay	(Australia) Jordan Kerr	(Kazakhstan) Andrey Golubev (Kazakhstan) Evgeny Korolev	3–6, 6–1, [6–10]
Win	6–10	Oct 2013	Mons, Belgium	Challenger	Hard	(Netherlands) Igor Sijsling	(United States) Eric Butorac (South Africa) Raven Klaasen	4–6, 7–6^{(7–2)}, [10–7]
Loss	6–11	May 2014	Tunis, Tunisia	Challenger	Clay	(Netherlands) Stephan Fransen	(France) Pierre-Hugues Herbert (Canada) Adil Shamasdin	3–6, 6–7^{(5–7)}
Loss	6–12	May 2014	Heilbronn, Germany	Challenger	Clay	(Australia) Rameez Junaid	(Germany) Tim Pütz (Germany) Andre Begemann	3–6, 3–6
Loss	6–13	Jul 2014	Scheveningen, Netherlands	Challenger	Clay	(Austria) Martin Fischer	(Netherlands) Matwé Middelkoop (Netherlands) Boy Westerhof	4–6, 6–3, [6–10]
Loss	6–14	Sep 2014	Seville, Spain	Challenger	Clay	(Republic of Ireland) James Cluskey	(Netherlands) Antal van der Duim (Netherlands) Boy Westerhof	6–7^{(3–7)}, 4–6
Loss	6–15	Mar 2016	Turkey F12, Antalya	Futures	Hard	(Bulgaria) Aleksandar Lazov	(Venezuela) Jordi Muñoz Abreu (Spain) David Pérez Sanz	0–6, 3–6
Loss	6–16	Sep 2016	Netherlands F7, Schoonhoven	Futures	Clay	(Netherlands) Lennert Van der Linden	(Netherlands) Niels Lootsma (Netherlands) Sidney de Boer	6–3, 5–7, [8–10]
Loss	6–17	Oct 2016	Croatia F11, Bol	Futures	Clay	(Netherlands) Paul Monteban	(Poland) Grzegorz Panfil (United Kingdom) James Marsalek	6–2, 6–7^{(2–7)}, [8–10]
