= The Hague Open =

The Hague Open ATP Challenger tour
- 2018 The Hague Open

ATP Challenger Tour
- Event name: Scheveningen
- Location: Scheveningen, Netherlands
- Venue: Mets Tennisbanen Berkenbosch
- Category: ATP Challenger Tour, Tretorn SERIE+
- Surface: Clay (red)
- Draw: 32S/27Q/16D
- Prize money: €64,000+H
- Website: Website

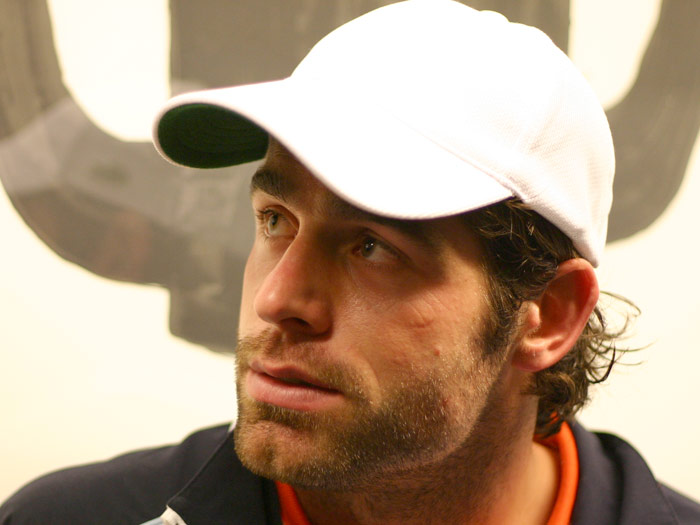
Dutch Raemon Sluiter is the event's most successful player, having reached three singles and three doubles finals, winning twice each time

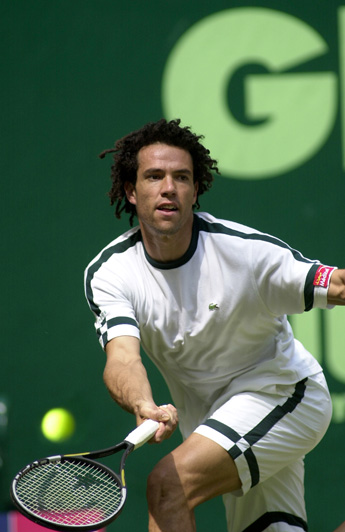
Moroccan Younes El Aynaoui defeated Martín Rodríguez to clinch the singles title in 1998

The Hague Open (also formally known for sponsorship reasons as the Siemens Open and the Sport 1 Open) was a professional tennis tournament played on outdoor red clay courts. It was part of the Association of Tennis Professionals (ATP) Challenger Tour until 2018 when it moved to Amersfoort as the Dutch Open. It was held annually in Scheveningen, Netherlands, since 1993, making it one of the oldest tournaments in the country. In its history, the event featured world-class players including Marat Safin, Marcelo Ríos, David Nalbandian, Nikolay Davydenko, Gaël Monfils and Richard Gasquet. The 26th edition of The Hague Open took place on July 16–22, 2018.

== Past finals ==
=== Singles ===
Year	Champion	Runner-up	Score
2018	(Netherlands) Thiemo de Bakker	(Germany) Yannick Maden	6–2, 6–1
2017	(Spain) Guillermo García López	(Belgium) Ruben Bemelmans	6–1, 6–7^{(3–7)}, 6–2
2016	(Netherlands) Robin Haase	(Czech Republic) Adam Pavlásek	6–4, 6–7^{(9–11)}, 6–2
2015	(Georgia (country)) Nikoloz Basilashvili	(Russia) Andrey Kuznetsov	6–7^{(3–7)}, 7–6^{(7–4)}, 6–3
2014	(Belgium) David Goffin	(Germany) Andreas Beck	6–3, 6–2
2013	(Netherlands) Jesse Huta Galung	(Netherlands) Robin Haase	6–3, 6–7^{(2–7)}, 6–4
2012	(Poland) Jerzy Janowicz	(Netherlands) Matwé Middelkoop	6–2, 6–2
2011	(Belgium) Steve Darcis	(Turkey) Marsel İlhan	6–3, 4–6, 6–2
2010	(Germany) Denis Gremelmayr	(Netherlands) Thomas Schoorel	7–5, 6–4
2009	(Belgium) Kristof Vliegen	(Spain) Albert Montañés	4–2 ret
2008	(Netherlands) Jesse Huta Galung	(Argentina) Diego Hartfield	6–3, 6–4
2007	(Uruguay) Pablo Cuevas	(Germany) Dominik Meffert	6–3, 6–4
2006	(Spain) Guillermo García López	(Spain) Albert Montañés	0–6, 6–3, 6–4
2005	(Netherlands) Melle van Gemerden	(Belgium) Kristof Vliegen	6–4, 6–3
2004	(Netherlands) Peter Wessels	(Netherlands) Raemon Sluiter	7–5, 7–6(7)
2003	(Australia) Todd Larkham	(Argentina) Diego Veronelli	7–6(4), 4–6, 6–4
2002	(Netherlands) Raemon Sluiter	(Spain) Salvador Navarro	7–6(6), 6–7(3), 7–6(4)
2001	(Netherlands) Raemon Sluiter	(France) Paul-Henri Mathieu	6–3, 6–4
2000	(France) Nicolas Coutelot	(Argentina) Martín Rodríguez	6–3 retired
1999	(Spain) Emilio Benfele Álvarez	(Netherlands) Martin Verkerk	6–3, 3–6, 3–2 retired
1998	(Morocco) Younes El Aynaoui	(Argentina) Martín Rodríguez	6–3, 6–1
1997	(Romania) Ion Moldovan	(Spain) Salvador Navarro	3–6, 7–5, 6–2
1996	(Netherlands) Dennis van Scheppingen	(Slovakia) Dominik Hrbatý	4–6, 6–3, 6–2
1995	(Spain) Jordi Arrese	(Romania) Andrei Pavel	6–3, 6–7, 6–4
1994	(Spain) Francisco Clavet	(Slovakia) Karol Kučera	3–6, 7–5, 6–2
1993	(Australia) Simon Youl	(Belgium) Bart Wuyts	7–5, 1–6, 6–4

=== Doubles ===
Year	Champions	Runners-up	Score
2018	(Philippines) Ruben Gonzales (United States) Nathaniel Lammons	(Venezuela) Luis David Martínez (Portugal) Gonçalo Oliveira	6–3, 6–7^{(8–10)}, [10–5]
2017	(Belgium) Sander Gillé (Belgium) Joran Vliegen	(Slovakia) Jozef Kovalík (Greece) Stefanos Tsitsipas	6–2, 4–6, [12–10]
2016	(Netherlands) Wesley Koolhof (Netherlands) Matwé Middelkoop	(Netherlands) Tallon Griekspoor (Netherlands) Tim van Rijthoven	6–1, 3–6, [13–11]
2015	(Uruguay) Ariel Behar (Brazil) Eduardo Dischinger	(Russia) Aslan Karatsev (Russia) Andrey Kuznetsov	0–0, retired
2014	(Netherlands) Matwé Middelkoop (Netherlands) Boy Westerhof	(Austria) Martin Fischer (Netherlands) Jesse Huta Galung	6–4, 3–6, [10–6]
2013	(Netherlands) Antal van der Duim (Netherlands) Boy Westerhof	(Germany) Gero Kretschmer (Germany) Alexander Satschko	6–3, 6–3
2012	(Netherlands) Antal van der Duim (Netherlands) Boy Westerhof	(Australia) Rameez Junaid (Germany) Simon Stadler	6–4, 5–7, [10–7]
2011	(Australia) Colin Ebelthite (Australia) Adam Feeney	(Australia) Rameez Junaid (Australia) Sadik Kadir	6–4, 6–7^{(5–7)}, [10–7]
2010	(Brazil) Franco Ferreiro (India) Harsh Mankad	(Australia) Rameez Junaid (Germany) Philipp Marx	6–4, 3–6, [10–7]
2009	(Argentina) Lucas Arnold Ker (Argentina) Máximo González	(Netherlands) Thomas Schoorel (Netherlands) Nick van der Meer	7–5, 6–2
2008	(Australia) Rameez Junaid (Germany) Philipp Marx	(Netherlands) Matwé Middelkoop (Netherlands) Melle van Gemerden	5–7, 6–2, [10–6]
2007	(Netherlands) Raemon Sluiter (Netherlands) Peter Wessels	(India) Rohan Bopanna (Uruguay) Pablo Cuevas	7–6(6), 7–5
2006	(Spain) Guillermo García López (Spain) Salvador Navarro	(France) Marc Gicquel (France) Édouard Roger-Vasselin	6–4, 0–6, 11–9
2005	(France) Julien Benneteau (France) Édouard Roger-Vasselin	(Belgium) Steve Darcis (Belgium) Kristof Vliegen	5–7, 7–5, 7–6(5)
2004	(Netherlands) Paul Logtens (Netherlands) Raemon Sluiter	(Italy) Enzo Artoni (Argentina) Juan Pablo Brzezicki	6–2, 7–5
2003	(Netherlands) Fred Hemmes Jr. (Netherlands) Edwin Kempes	(Spain) Óscar Hernández (Spain) Salvador Navarro	3–6, 6–4, 6–3
2002	(Netherlands) Edwin Kempes (Netherlands) Martin Verkerk	(Argentina) Mariano Hood (Argentina) Sebastián Prieto	6–4, 6–4
2001	(Australia) Jordan Kerr (Australia) Grant Silcock	(United States) Brandon Coupe (Australia) Tim Crichton	6–3, 6–4
2000	(Australia) Paul Hanley (Australia) Nathan Healey	(Germany) Marcus Hilpert (Austria) Thomas Strengberger	6–2, 1–6, 6–3
1999	(Israel) Eyal Ran (Belgium) Tom Vanhoudt	(New Zealand) James Greenhalgh (South Africa) Paul Rosner	6–4, 6–4
1998	(Argentina) Agustín Calleri (Sweden) Tobias Hildebrand	(Argentina) Sebastián Prieto (Argentina) Martín Rodríguez	6–2, 3–6, 6–2
1997	(Spain) Álex Calatrava (Belgium) Tom Vanhoudt	(Netherlands) Raemon Sluiter (Netherlands) Peter Wessels	6–7, 6–2, 7–6
1996	(United States) Brandon Coupe (South Africa) Paul Rosner	(Netherlands) Martijn Bok (Netherlands) Dennis van Scheppingen	6–1, 3–6, 6–0
1995	(Romania) Andrei Pavel (Israel) Eyal Ran	(Spain) Emilio Benfele Álvarez (Spain) Jose Imaz-Ruiz	6–4, 6–4
1994	(Sweden) Marten Renström (Sweden) Mikael Tillström	(Netherlands) Stephen Noteboom (Belgium) Tom Vanhoudt	3–6, 7–5, 6–3
1993	(Sweden) Nils Holm (Sweden) Lars-Anders Wahlgren	(Netherlands) Jacco Eltingh (Netherlands) Paul Haarhuis	6–1, 6–2
