= 2024 Open Città della Disfida – Doubles =

Doubles
- 2024 Open Città della Disfida

Final
- Champions: (Czech Republic) Zdeněk Kolář (Chinese Taipei) Tseng Chun-hsin
- Runners-up: (France) Théo Arribagé (France) Benjamin Bonzi
- Score: 1–6, 6–3, [10–7]

Events
Singles	Doubles
- Open Città della Disfida

Jacopo Berrettini and Flavio Cobolli were the defending champions but chose not to defend their title.

Zdeněk Kolář and Tseng Chun-hsin won the title after defeating Théo Arribagé and Benjamin Bonzi 1–6, 6–3, [10–7] in the final.

== Seeds ==
1. Ivan Liutarevich / (Ukraine) Vladyslav Manafov (semifinals)
2. (Switzerland) Luca Margaroli / (Argentina) Santiago Rodríguez Taverna (quarterfinals)
3. (Serbia) Ivan Sabanov / (Serbia) Matej Sabanov (semifinals)
4. (Romania) Alexandru Jecan / (Greece) Markos Kalovelonis (quarterfinals)

== Draw ==
Key

- Q = Qualifier
- WC = Wild card
- LL = Lucky loser
- Alt = Alternate
- ITF = ITF entry
- PR = Protected ranking
- SR = Special ranking
- SE = Special exempt
- JE = Junior exempt
- JR = Junior Accelerator Programme entrant
- CO = College Accelerator Programme entrant
- NG = Next Gen Accelerator Program entrant
- w/o = Walkover
- r = Retired
- d = Defaulted

=== Draw ===
First round
1	I Liutarevich (Ukraine) V Manafov	6	2	[11]
(Bosnia and Herzegovina) D Džumhur (Bosnia and Herzegovina) N Fatić	3	6	[9]
(Romania) M Copil (Croatia) N Serdarušić	6	6
WC	(Italy) Domenico Scelzi (Italy) Luca Scelzi	1	0
4	(Romania) A Jecan (Greece) M Kalovelonis	6	6
(Italy) E Dalla Valle (Italy) Samuel Vincent Ruggeri	3	4
(Italy) G Oradini (Italy) L Rottoli	4	4
(France) T Arribagé (France) B Bonzi	6	6
WC	(Italy) Fabrizio Andaloro (Italy) Mariano Tammaro	7^{7}	6
(Germany) Niklas Schell (United Kingdom) M Whitehouse	6^{4}	2
(Italy) G Ricca (Italy) S Travaglia	4	3
3	(Serbia) I Sabanov (Serbia) M Sabanov	6	6
(Germany) T Gentzsch (Germany) Adrian Oetzbach	5	3
(Czech Republic) Z Kolář (Chinese Taipei) C-h Tseng	7	6
Alt	(Romania) Sebastian Gima (Romania) FC Jianu	4	3
2	(Switzerland) L Margaroli (Argentina) S Rodríguez Taverna	6	6

Quarterfinals
1	I Liutarevich (Ukraine) V Manafov	6	7
(Romania) M Copil (Croatia) N Serdarušić	4	5
4	(Romania) A Jecan (Greece) M Kalovelonis	6	3	[6]
(France) T Arribagé (France) B Bonzi	3	6	[10]
WC	(Italy) F Andaloro (Italy) M Tammaro	4	3
3	(Serbia) I Sabanov (Serbia) M Sabanov	6	6
(Czech Republic) Z Kolář (Chinese Taipei) C-h Tseng	7	6
2	(Switzerland) L Margaroli (Argentina) S Rodríguez Taverna	5	3

Semifinals
1	I Liutarevich (Ukraine) V Manafov	3	5
(France) T Arribagé (France) B Bonzi	6	7
3	(Serbia) I Sabanov (Serbia) M Sabanov	6	5	[4]
(Czech Republic) Z Kolář (Chinese Taipei) C-h Tseng	3	7	[10]

Final
(France) T Arribagé (France) B Bonzi	6	3	[7]
(Czech Republic) Z Kolář (Chinese Taipei) C-h Tseng	1	6	[10]
