= 2016 TEAN International – Men's singles =

Men's singles
- 2016 TEAN International

Final
- Champion: (Germany) Jan-Lennard Struff
- Runner-up: (Netherlands) Robin Haase
- Score: 6–4, 6–1

Events
| Singles | men | women |
| Doubles | men | women |
| ← 2015 · | TEAN International | · 2017 → |

Damir Džumhur was the defending champion but lost in the semifinals to Jan-Lennard Struff.

Struff won the title after defeating Robin Haase 6–4, 6–1 in the final.

== Seeds ==
1. (Netherlands) Robin Haase (final)
2. (Bosnia and Herzegovina) Damir Džumhur (semifinals, retired)
3. (Germany) Jan-Lennard Struff (champion)
4. (Slovenia) Grega Žemlja (second round)
5. (Netherlands) Thiemo de Bakker (semifinals)
6. (France) Constant Lestienne (quarterfinals)
7. (Croatia) Franko Škugor (quarterfinals)
8. (Serbia) Peđa Krstin (first round)

== Draw ==
=== Key ===
- Q = Qualifier
- WC = Wild card
- LL = Lucky loser
- Alt = Alternate
- SE = Special exempt
- PR = Protected ranking
- ITF = ITF entry
- JE = Junior exempt
- w/o = Walkover
- r = Retired
- d = Defaulted
- SR = Special ranking

=== Finals ===
Semifinals
1 | (Netherlands) Robin Haase | 7 | 6
5 | (Netherlands) Thiemo de Bakker | 5 | 1
3 | (Germany) Jan-Lennard Struff | 6 | 4 | 4
2 | (Bosnia and Herzegovina) Damir Džumhur | 1 | 6 | 0^{r}

Final
1 | (Netherlands) Robin Haase | 4 | 1
3 | (Germany) Jan-Lennard Struff | 6 | 6

=== Top half ===
First round
1 | (Netherlands) R Haase | 6 | 6
Q | (Poland) A Kapaś | 2 | 2
(Serbia) N Milojević | 6 | 5 | 0
(Belgium) G Gigounon | 3 | 7 | 6
WC | (Netherlands) J Sels | 4 | 2
(Austria) D Novak | 6 | 6
Q | (Germany) O Otte | 3 | 4
6 | (France) C Lestienne | 6 | 6
4 | (Slovenia) G Žemlja | 6 | 6
(United Kingdom) J Ward | 2 | 1
Q | (Germany) C-M Stebe | 6 | 6
(France) T Lamasine | 2 | 2
(Belgium) Y Reuter | 6 | 6^{1} | 6
WC | (Netherlands) B van de Zandschulp | 2 | 7^{7} | 3
(Bulgaria) D Kuzmanov | 4 | 3
5 | (Netherlands) T de Bakker | 6 | 6

Second round
1 | (Netherlands) R Haase | 7^{11} | 6
(Belgium) G Gigounon | 6^{9} | 4
(Austria) D Novak | 4 | 1
6 | (France) C Lestienne | 6 | 6
4 | (Slovenia) G Žemlja | 2 | 6 | 5
Q | (Germany) C-M Stebe | 6 | 3 | 7
(Belgium) Y Reuter | 4 | 6^{4}
5 | (Netherlands) T de Bakker | 6 | 7^{7}

Quarterfinals
1 | (Netherlands) R Haase | 6 | 6
6 | (France) C Lestienne | 1 | 4
Q | (Germany) C-M Stebe | 6^{3} | 6 | 4
5 | (Netherlands) T de Bakker | 7^{7} | 3 | 6

Semifinals
1 | (Netherlands) R Haase | 7 | 6
5 | (Netherlands) T de Bakker | 5 | 1

=== Bottom half ===
First round
7 | (Croatia) F Škugor | 6 | 6
(Egypt) M Safwat | 3 | 4
(Belgium) Clément Geens | 3 | 2
LL | (Lithuania) L Mugevičius | 6 | 6
(Spain) P Riba | 4 | 6 | 6
Alt | (Romania) D Dima | 6 | 1 | 2
Q | (France) M Chazal | 7^{7} | 3 | 0
3 | (Germany) J-L Struff | 6^{2} | 6 | 6
8 | (Serbia) P Krstin | 6^{5} | 6 | 4
(Germany) D Masur | 7^{7} | 1 | 6
(Portugal) P Sousa | 2 | 6 | 6
WC | (Netherlands) T Griekspoor | 6 | 1 | 3
PR | (Netherlands) B Westerhof | 7^{7} | 6^{5} | 6
(Belarus) U Ignatik | 6^{5} | 7^{7} | 3
(Austria) B Trinker | 1 | 0
2 | (Bosnia and Herzegovina) D Džumhur | 6 | 6

Second round
7 | (Croatia) F Škugor | 7 | 6
LL | (Lithuania) L Mugevičius | 5 | 4
(Spain) P Riba
3 | (Germany) J-L Struff | w/o
(Germany) D Masur | 6 | 6
(Portugal) P Sousa | 3 | 3
PR | (Netherlands) B Westerhof | 7^{11} | 4 | 0^{r}
2 | (Bosnia and Herzegovina) D Džumhur | 6^{9} | 6 | 3

Quarterfinals
7 | (Croatia) F Škugor | 1 | 4
3 | (Germany) J-L Struff | 6 | 6
(Germany) D Masur | 2 | 2
2 | (Bosnia and Herzegovina) D Džumhur | 6 | 6

Semifinals
3 | (Germany) J-L Struff | 6 | 4 | 4
2 | (Bosnia and Herzegovina) D Džumhur | 1 | 6 | 0^{r}
