= 2016 TEAN International – Men's doubles =

Men's doubles
- 2016 TEAN International

Final
- Champions: (Germany) Daniel Masur (Germany) Jan-Lennard Struff
- Runners-up: (Netherlands) Robin Haase (Netherlands) Boy Westerhof
- Score: 6–4, 6–1

Events
Singles	men	women
Doubles	men	women
← 2015 ·	TEAN International	· 2017 →

Tobias Kamke and Jan-Lennard Struff were the defending champions but only Struff decided to defend his title, partnering Daniel Masur.

Struff successfully defended his title, defeating Robin Haase and Boy Westerhof 6–4, 6–1 in the final.

== Seeds ==
1. (Netherlands) Wesley Koolhof / (Netherlands) Matwé Middelkoop (first round)
2. (France) Tristan Lamasine / (Croatia) Franko Škugor (quarterfinals)
3. (Netherlands) Sander Arends / (Poland) Adam Majchrowicz (first round)
4. (Belgium) Sander Gillé / (Belgium) Joran Vliegen (quarterfinals)

== Draw ==
=== Key ===
- Q = Qualifier
- WC = Wild card
- LL = Lucky loser
- Alt = Alternate
- SE = Special exempt
- PR = Protected ranking
- ITF = ITF entry
- JE = Junior exempt
- w/o = Walkover
- r = Retired
- d = Defaulted
- SR = Special ranking

First round
1	(Netherlands) W Koolhof (Netherlands) M Middelkoop	6	2	[6]
(Germany) A Mies (Germany) O Otte	1	6	[10]
(Netherlands) T Griekspoor (Netherlands) J Huta Galung
WC	(Netherlands) N Lootsma (Netherlands) B van de Zandschulp	w/o
3	(Netherlands) S Arends (Poland) A Majchrowicz	5	6	[8]
(Switzerland) L Margaroli (Egypt) M Safwat	7	3	[10]
(Germany) D Masur (Germany) J-L Struff	4	6	[10]
(Bulgaria) D Kuzmanov (Serbia) N Milojević	6	2	[4]
WC	(Netherlands) Michiel de Krom (Netherlands) Roy de Valk	3	4
(Netherlands) R Haase (Netherlands) B Westerhof	6	6
(Romania) D Dima (Austria) B Trinker	7	2	[4]
4	(Belgium) S Gillé (Belgium) J Vliegen	5	6	[10]
(Bosnia and Herzegovina) D Džumhur (Austria) D Novak	6	6
(Lithuania) L Mugevičius (Netherlands) D Pel	2	4
WC	(Netherlands) J Sels (Netherlands) Vincent van der Honert	6^{3}	3
2	(France) T Lamasine (Croatia) F Škugor	7^{7}	6

Quarterfinals
(Germany) A Mies (Germany) O Otte	6	6
WC	(Netherlands) N Lootsma (Netherlands) B van de Zandschulp	3	4
(Switzerland) L Margaroli (Egypt) M Safwat	6	4	[6]
(Germany) D Masur (Germany) J-L Struff	3	6	[10]
(Netherlands) R Haase (Netherlands) B Westerhof	7^{7}	1	[10]
4	(Belgium) S Gillé (Belgium) J Vliegen	6^{3}	6	[7]
(Bosnia and Herzegovina) D Džumhur (Austria) D Novak	3	6	[10]
2	(France) T Lamasine (Croatia) F Škugor	6	4	[5]

Semifinals
(Germany) A Mies (Germany) O Otte	4	0
(Germany) D Masur (Germany) J-L Struff	6	6
(Netherlands) R Haase (Netherlands) B Westerhof	6	6
(Bosnia and Herzegovina) D Džumhur (Austria) D Novak	2	3

Final
(Germany) D Masur (Germany) J-L Struff	6	6
(Netherlands) R Haase (Netherlands) B Westerhof	4	1
