= 2024 Open Città della Disfida =

- Date: 1–7 April
- Edition: 24th
- Surface: Clay
- Location: Barletta, Italy

Champions

Singles
- (Bosnia and Herzegovina) Damir Džumhur

Doubles
- (Czech Republic) Zdeněk Kolář / (Chinese Taipei) Tseng Chun-hsin
- Open Città della Disfida

The 2024 Open Città della Disfida was a professional tennis tournament played on clay courts. It was the 24th edition of the tournament which was part of the 2024 ATP Challenger Tour. It took place in Barletta, Italy between 1 and 7 April 2024.

== Singles main-draw entrants ==
=== Seeds ===
Country	Player	Rank^{1}	Seed
FRA	Harold Mayot	141	1
BIH	Damir Džumhur	159	2
AUT	Filip Misolic	166	3
FRA	Benjamin Bonzi	168	4
ITA	Stefano Travaglia	190	5
ITA	Franco Agamenone	195	6
BIH	Nerman Fatić	200	7
ITA	Francesco Maestrelli	226	8

- ^{1} Rankings are as of 18 March 2024.

=== Other entrants ===
The following players received wildcards into the singles main draw:

- (Georgia (country)) Nikoloz Basilashvili
- (Italy) Jacopo Berrettini
- (Italy) Marcello Serafini

The following players received entry into the singles main draw as alternates:

- (Romania) Filip Cristian Jianu
- (Italy) Giovanni Oradini

The following players received entry from the qualifying draw:

- (Australia) Matthew Dellavedova
- (Spain) Carlos Gimeno Valero
- (Italy) Andrea Guerrieri
- Kirill Kivattsev
- (Italy) Andrea Picchione
- (Argentina) Santiago Rodríguez Taverna

== Champions ==
=== Singles ===
- (Bosnia and Herzegovina) Damir Džumhur def. (France) Harold Mayot 6–1, 6–3.

=== Doubles ===
- (Czech Republic) Zdeněk Kolář / (Chinese Taipei) Tseng Chun-hsin def. (France) Théo Arribagé / (France) Benjamin Bonzi 1–6, 6–3, [10–7].
