= 2015 TEAN International – Men's singles =

Men's singles
- 2015 TEAN International

Final
- Champion: (Bosnia and Herzegovina) Damir Džumhur
- Runner-up: (Netherlands) Igor Sijsling
- Score: 6–1, 2–6, 6–1

Events
Singles	men	women
Doubles	men	women
← 2014 ·	TEAN International	· 2016 →

Jesse Huta Galung was the defending champion, but lost in the first round to Jan-Lennard Struff.
Damir Džumhur won the title, defeating Igor Sijsling in the final, 6–1, 2–6, 6–1.

== Seeds ==
1. (Bosnia and Herzegovina) Damir Džumhur (champion)
2. (Germany) Jan-Lennard Struff (second round)
3. (Netherlands) Thiemo de Bakker (first round)
4. (Netherlands) Igor Sijsling (final)
5. (Germany) Tobias Kamke (quarterfinals)
6. (Belgium) Germain Gigounon (first round)
7. (France) Calvin Hemery (second round)
8. (France) Tristan Lamasine (semifinals)

== Draw ==
=== Key ===
- Q = Qualifier
- WC = Wild card
- LL = Lucky loser
- Alt = Alternate
- SE = Special exempt
- PR = Protected ranking
- ITF = ITF entry
- JE = Junior exempt
- w/o = Walkover
- r = Retired
- d = Defaulted
- SR = Special ranking

=== Finals ===
Semifinals
1	(Bosnia and Herzegovina) Damir Džumhur	7	7^{7}
(Slovenia) Grega Žemlja	5	6^{3}
4	(Netherlands) Igor Sijsling	6	6
8	(France) Tristan Lamasine	4	3

Final
1	(Bosnia and Herzegovina) Damir Džumhur	6	2	6
4	(Netherlands) Igor Sijsling	1	6	1

=== Top half ===
First round
1	(Bosnia and Herzegovina) D Džumhur	6	6
(Czech Republic) M Michalička	2	3
Q	(Poland) M Gawron	6	6
(Poland) G Panfil	1	4
(France) M Chazal	6	7
(Estonia) V Ivanov	3	5
(Austria) D Novak	6	6
6	(Belgium) G Gigounon	0	2
3	(Netherlands) T de Bakker	3	4
(Slovenia) G Žemlja	6	6
WC	(Netherlands) J Sels	6^{4}	6^{8}
(Belgium) J Cagnina	7^{7}	7^{10}
Q	(Brazil) E Dischinger	6	7^{7}
(Italy) R Bellotti	4	6^{3}
WC	(Netherlands) T Schoorel	3	2
5	(Germany) T Kamke	6	6

Second round
1	(Bosnia and Herzegovina) D Džumhur	6	6
Q	(Poland) M Gawron	4	2
(France) M Chazal	7	4	2
(Austria) D Novak	5	6	6
(Slovenia) G Žemlja	6	4	6
(Belgium) J Cagnina	4	6	2
Q	(Brazil) E Dischinger	2	1
5	(Germany) T Kamke	6	6

Quarterfinals
1	(Bosnia and Herzegovina) D Džumhur	4	6	7^{7}
(Austria) D Novak	6	3	6^{4}
(Slovenia) G Žemlja	7^{7}	3	6
5	(Germany) T Kamke	6^{3}	6	4

Semifinals
1	(Bosnia and Herzegovina) D Džumhur	7	7^{7}
(Slovenia) G Žemlja	5	6^{3}

=== Bottom half ===
First round
7	(France) C Hemery	7^{7}	6
(Slovakia) Adrian Sikora	6^{4}	4
WC	(Netherlands) Vincent Van den Honert	1	4
(Romania) V Hănescu	6	6
(France) Jules Marie	0	3
WC	(Netherlands) T Griekspoor	6	6
Q	(Ukraine) Vadym Ursu	2	0
4	(Netherlands) I Sijsling	6	6
8	(France) T Lamasine	6	6
Q	(Portugal) Romain Barbosa	2	3
(Bulgaria) A Lazov	3	7	5
(Romania) A Ungur	6	5	7
(Belgium) A De Greef	6	6^{5}	1
(France) C Lestienne	4	7^{7}	6
(Netherlands) J Huta Galung	6^{9}	4
2	(Germany) J-L Struff	7^{11}	6

Second round
7	(France) C Hemery	7^{7}	3	5
(Romania) V Hănescu	6^{3}	6	7
WC	(Netherlands) T Griekspoor	1	2
4	(Netherlands) I Sijsling	6	6
8	(France) T Lamasine	3	7	6
(Romania) A Ungur	6	5	1
(France) C Lestienne	6	6
2	(Germany) J-L Struff	1	3

Quarterfinals
(Romania) V Hănescu	4	6^{6}
4	(Netherlands) I Sijsling	6	7^{8}
8	(France) T Lamasine	2	7^{7}	6
(France) C Lestienne	6	6^{2}	3

Semifinals
4	(Netherlands) I Sijsling	6	6
8	(France) T Lamasine	4	3
