= 2016 TEAN International =

- Date: 6–11 September
- Edition: 21st (men); 16th (women)
- Surface: Clay
- Location: Alphen aan den Rijn, Netherlands

Champions

Men's singles
- (Germany) Jan-Lennard Struff

Women's singles
- (Netherlands) Chayenne Ewijk

Men's doubles
- (Germany) Daniel Masur / (Germany) Jan-Lennard Struff

Women's doubles
- (Netherlands) Nina Kruijer / (Netherlands) Suzan Lamens
← 2015 ·	TEAN International	· 2017 →

The 2016 TEAN International was a professional tennis tournament played on outdoor clay courts. It was the 21st edition of the tournament which was part of the 2016 ATP Challenger Tour and the 16th edition of the tournament for the 2016 ITF Women's Circuit. It took place in Alphen aan den Rijn, Netherlands, on 6 – 11 September 2016.

== ATP singles main draw entrants ==
=== Seeds ===
Country	Player	Rank^{1}	Seed
NED	Robin Haase	62	1
BIH	Damir Džumhur	72	2
GER	Jan-Lennard Struff	78	3
SLO	Grega Žemlja	149	4
NED	Thiemo de Bakker	150	5
FRA	Constant Lestienne	168	6
CRO	Franko Škugor	190	7
SRB	Peđa Krstin	200	8

- ^{1} Rankings are as of August 29, 2016.

=== Other entrants ===
The following players received wildcards into the singles main draw:

- (Netherlands) Jelle Sels
- (Netherlands) Botic van de Zandschulp
- (Netherlands) Jesse Huta Galung
- (Netherlands) Tallon Griekspoor

The following player received entry into the singles main draw with a protected ranking:

- (Netherlands) Boy Westerhof

The following player received entry as an alternate:

- (Romania) Dragoș Dima

The following players received entry from the qualifying draw:

- (France) Maxime Chazal
- (Germany) Oscar Otte
- (Poland) Andriej Kapaś
- (Germany) Cedrik-Marcel Stebe

The following player received entry as a lucky loser:

- (Lithuania) Lukas Mugevičius

== WTA singles main draw entrants ==
=== Seeds ===
Country	Player	Rank^{1}	Seed
NED	Chayenne Ewijk	482	1
BLR	Sviatlana Pirazhenka	599	2
ESP	Yvonne Cavallé Reimers	644	3
NED	Mandy Wagemaker	671	4
ROU	Diana Buzean	766	5
GER	Julyette Steur	769	6
NED	Erika Vogelsang	810	7
GER	Lena Rüffer	869	8

- ^{1} Rankings are as of August 29, 2016.

=== Other entrants ===
The following players received wildcards into the singles main draw:

- (Netherlands) Dainah Cameron
- (Netherlands) Dewi Dijkman
- (Netherlands) Nina Kruijer
- (Netherlands) Suzan Lamens

The following players received entry from the qualifying draw:

- (Germany) Jacqueline Böpple
- (Netherlands) Liv Geurts
- (Netherlands) Donnaroza Gouvernante
- (Netherlands) Liza Lebedzeva
- (Netherlands) Noa Liauw a Fong
- (Romania) Diana Popescu
- (Netherlands) Kelly Versteeg
- (Netherlands) Claire Verwerda

The following player received entry as a lucky loser:

- (Czech Republic) Anna Mária Kalavská

== Champions ==
=== Men's singles ===
- (Germany) Jan-Lennard Struff def. (Netherlands) Robin Haase, 6–4, 6–1

=== Women's singles ===
- (Netherlands) Chayenne Ewijk def. (Netherlands) Suzan Lamens, 7–5, 7–5

=== Men's doubles ===
- (Germany) Daniel Masur / (Germany) Jan-Lennard Struff def. (Netherlands) Robin Haase / (Netherlands) Boy Westerhof, 6–4, 6–1

=== Women's doubles ===
- (Netherlands) Nina Kruijer / (Netherlands) Suzan Lamens def. (Netherlands) Chayenne Ewijk / (Netherlands) Rosalie van der Hoek, 6–0, 3–6, [10–5]
