= Liverpool International Tennis Tournament =

Exhibition
- Founded: 2002
- Location: Liverpool, Merseyside, England; Great Britain
- Venue: Calderstones Park (2002–2013); Aigburth Cricket Ground (2014–present)
- Category: Exhibition
- Surface: Grass
- Website: Official website

The Liverpool International Tennis Tournament (currently known as the Qube Liverpool International Tennis Tournament due to sponsorship and formerly sponsored by Liverpool Hope University, Medicash, Tradition ICAP and Williams BMW) is an international four-day tennis exhibition event played annually in June as a grass court warm-up event before Wimbledon. Since 2014 the tournament is held at the Aigburth Cricket Ground in Liverpool, having been previously played in Calderstones Park.

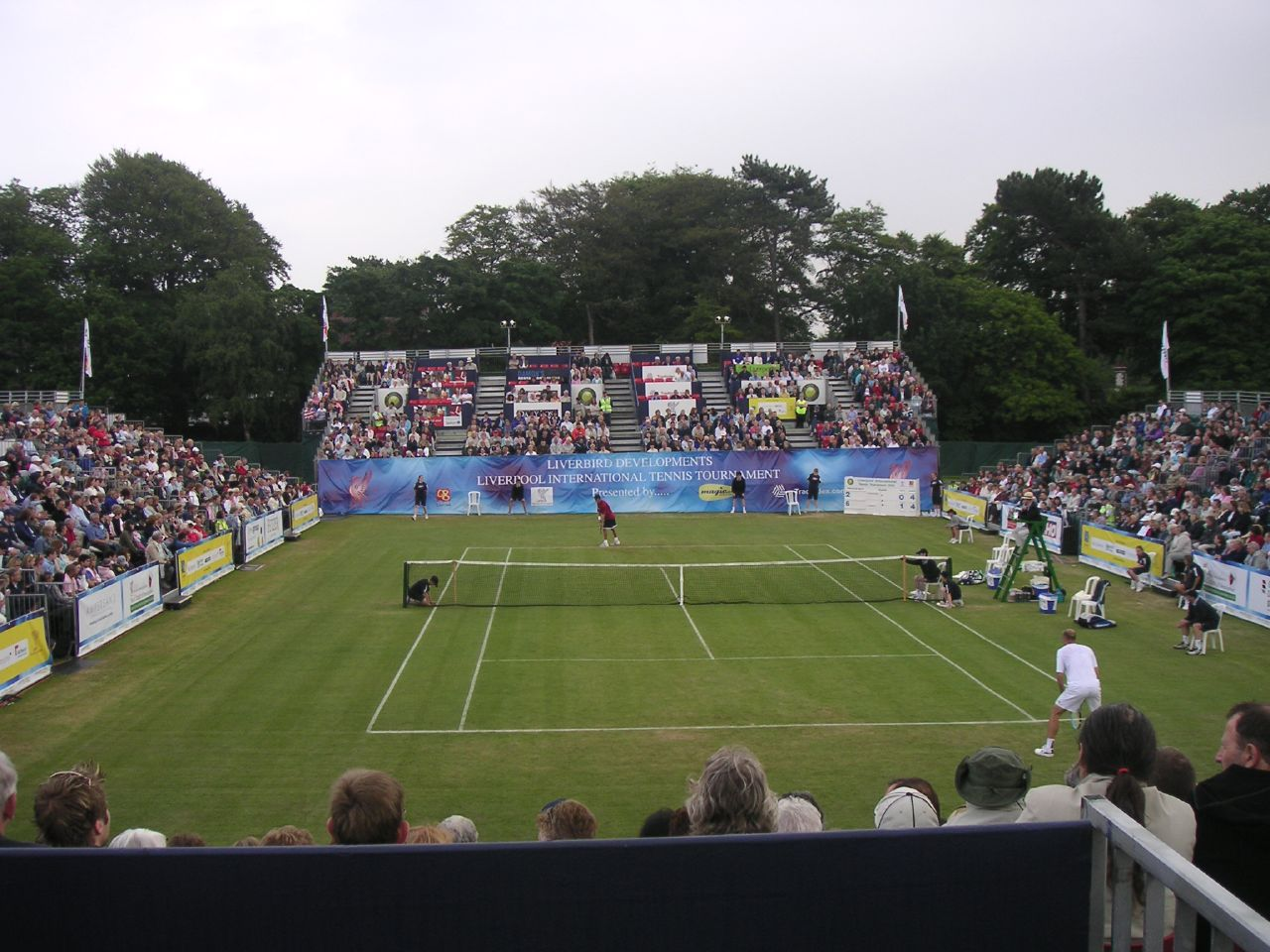
Calderstones Park's tennis court

== Past finals ==
=== Men's Champions ===
Year	Champion	Runner(s)-up	Score
2025	(United Kingdom) Patrick Brady	(Norway) Viktor Durasovic	[10–8]
2024	(United Kingdom) Patrick Brady	(United States) Robert Kendrick	7–6, 6–3
2023	(France) Enzo Couacaud	(Bulgaria) Dimitar Kuzmanov	7–6, 7–6
2022	(Bulgaria) Dimitar Kuzmanov	(United Kingdom) Marcus Willis	6–4, 6–7, [12–10]
2021	(United Kingdom) James Ward	(United Kingdom) Marcus Willis	6–3, 6–4
2020	No competition (due to COVID-19 pandemic)		
2019	(Italy) Paolo Lorenzi	(United States) Robert Kendrick	7–6(3), 6–4
2018	(Italy) Alessandro Giannessi	(United States) Robert Kendrick	7–6(5), 7–6(4)
2017	(Belgium) Steve Darcis	(United Kingdom) Marcus Willis	7–6(3), 6–3
2016	(Bosnia and Herzegovina) Damir Džumhur	(Italy) Paolo Lorenzi	7–5, 4–6, [10–3]
2015	(United Kingdom) Aljaž Bedene	(Spain) Pablo Andújar (Bosnia and Herzegovina) Damir Džumhur	—
2014	(United States) Michael Russell	(Russia) Andrey Rublev	6–4, 5–7, [10–?]
2013	(Argentina) Martín Alund	(Argentina) Guido Pella	7–6, 6–3
2012	(South Africa) Kevin Anderson	(Slovakia) Lukáš Lacko	6–3, 1–6, [10–7]
2011	(Chile) Fernando González	(Portugal) Frederico Gil	6–1, 7–6^{(8–6)}
2010	(France) Paul-Henri Mathieu	(Chile) Nicolás Massú	6–3, 6–2
2009	(United States) Mardy Fish	(United States) Vincent Spadea	6–4, 6–2
2008	(United States) Amer Delić	(Chile) Paul Capdeville	6–7^{(3–7)}, 6–4, [10–7]
2007	(Spain) David Ferrer	(United States) Vincent Spadea	6–4, 6–4
2006	(Belgium) Xavier Malisse	(United States) Vincent Spadea	3–6, 7–5, [14–12]
2005	(Croatia) Ivan Ljubičić	(Russia) Mikhail Youzhny	3–6, 7–6^{(7–4)}, 7–6^{(7–5)}
2004	(Croatia) Ivan Ljubičić	(Georgia (country)) Irakli Labadze	6–2, 6–7^{(9–11)}, 6–4
2003	(United States) Jan-Michael Gambill	(United States) Alex Kim	6–4, 6–2
2002	(Russia) Marat Safin	(United States) Jan-Michael Gambill	7–6^{(8–6)}, 6–7^{(3–7)}, 6–4

=== Women's Champions ===
Year	Champion	Runner-up	Score
2025	(Romania) Patricia Țig	(United Kingdom) Abi Redman	[10–5]
2024	(United States) Sachia Vickery	(United Kingdom) Tara Moore	6–4, 6–4
2023	(Uzbekistan) Nigina Abduraimova	(Belgium) Marie Benoît	6–3, 6–3
2022	(China) Wang Qiang	(Argentina) Nadia Podoroska	7–5, 6–4
2021	(United Kingdom) Sarah Beth Grey	(United Kingdom) Amelia Stuart	6–0, 6–1
2020	No competition (due to COVID-19 pandemic)		
2019	(Estonia) Kaia Kanepi	(Italy) Corinna Dentoni	6–2, 6–2
2018	(Italy) Corinna Dentoni ( (France) Marion Bartoli w.o)	(England) Ellie Tsimbilakis	6–2, 6–2
2017	(Slovenia) Polona Hercog	(Italy) Corinna Dentoni	6–2, 6–4
2016	(China) Wang Qiang	(Norway) Melanie Stokke	6–2, 4–6, [10–6]
2015	(Romania) Ana Bogdan	(Romania) Elena Bogdan	6–3, 7–6^{(7–5)}
2014	(United Kingdom) Jodie Burrage	(United Kingdom) Tara Moore	6–4, 7–5
2013	(United States) CoCo Vandeweghe	(Romania) Alexandra Cadanțu	6–2, 6–2
2012	(Switzerland) Belinda Bencic	(United States) Sachia Vickery	10–7
2011	(Switzerland) Martina Hingis	(United Kingdom) Chloe Murphy	8–6
2010	(Canada) Eugenie Bouchard	(Norway) Ulrikke Eikeri	6–3, 6–3
2009	(Portugal) Michelle Larcher de Brito	(United Kingdom) Laura Robson	6–4, 2–6, [10–6]
2008	(Denmark) Caroline Wozniacki	(United States) Ashley Harkleroad	4–6, 6–4, [10–5]
2007	(United States) Ashley Harkleroad	(Denmark) Caroline Wozniacki	7–6^{(7–1)}, 3–6, [10–8]
2006	(Denmark) Caroline Wozniacki	(Ukraine) Olga Savchuk	7–6, 6–3
