= 2015 TEAN International =

- Date: 7–13 September
- Edition: 20th (men); 15th (women)
- Surface: Clay
- Location: Alphen aan den Rijn, Netherlands

Champions

Men's singles
- (Bosnia and Herzegovina) Damir Džumhur

Women's singles
- (Belgium) Marie Benoît

Men's doubles
- (Germany) Tobias Kamke / (Germany) Jan-Lennard Struff

Women's doubles
- (Sweden) Quirine Lemoine / (Netherlands) Eva Wacanno
← 2014 ·	TEAN International	· 2016 →

The 2015 TEAN International was a professional tennis tournament played on outdoor clay courts. It was the 20th edition of the tournament which was part of the 2015 ATP Challenger Tour and the 15th edition of the tournament for the 2015 ITF Women's Circuit. It took place in Alphen aan den Rijn, Netherlands, on 7 – 13 September 2015.

== ATP singles main draw entrants ==
=== Seeds ===
Country	Player	Rank^{1}	Seed
BIH	Damir Džumhur	98	1
GER	Jan-Lennard Struff	115	2
NED	Thiemo de Bakker	147	3
NED	Igor Sijsling	167	4
GER	Tobias Kamke	172	5
BEL	Germain Gigounon	188	6
FRA	Calvin Hemery	203	7
FRA	Tristan Lamasine	206	8

- ^{1} Rankings are as of August 31, 2015.

=== Other entrants ===
The following players received wildcards into the singles main draw:

- (Netherlands) Tallon Griekspoor
- (Netherlands) Thomas Schoorel
- (Netherlands) Jelle Sels
- (Netherlands) Vincent Van den Honert

The following players received entry from the qualifying draw:

- (Portugal) Romain Barbosa
- (Brazil) Eduardo Dischinger
- (Poland) Marcin Gawron
- (Ukraine) Vadym Ursu

== WTA singles main draw entrants ==
=== Seeds ===
Country	Player	Rank^{1}	Seed
NED	Richèl Hogenkamp	122	1
ITA	Alberta Brianti	197	2
NED	Lesley Kerkhove	217	3
FRA	Chloé Paquet	250	4
NED	Arantxa Rus	254	5
SRB	Ivana Jorović	270	6
CZE	Jesika Malečková	289	7
ITA	Gioia Barbieri	292	8

- ^{1} Rankings are as of August 31, 2015.

=== Other entrants ===
The following players received wildcards into the singles main draw:

- (Netherlands) Nikki Luttikhuis
- (Netherlands) Kelly Versteeg
- (Netherlands) Eva Wacanno
- (Netherlands) Mandy Wagemaker

The following players received entry from the qualifying draw:

- (Netherlands) Chayenne Ewijk
- (France) Laëtitia Sarrazin
- (United States) Zoë Gwen Scandalis
- (Belgium) Anastasia Smirnova
- (Moldova) Iana Tishchenko
- (Germany) Caroline Übelhör
- (Slovakia) Natália Vajdová
- (Netherlands) Bibiane Weijers

== Champions ==
=== Men's singles ===
- (Bosnia and Herzegovina) Damir Džumhur def. (Netherlands) Igor Sijsling 6–1, 2–6, 6–1

=== Women's singles ===
- (Belgium) Marie Benoît def. (Croatia) Tena Lukas 5–7, 6–3, 6–4

=== Men's doubles ===
- (Germany) Tobias Kamke / (Germany) Jan-Lennard Struff def. (Romania) Victor Hănescu / (Romania) Adrian Ungur 7–6^{(7–1)}, 4–6, [10–7]

=== Women's doubles ===
- (Sweden) Quirine Lemoine / (Netherlands) Eva Wacanno def. (Netherlands) Lesley Kerkhove / (Netherlands) Arantxa Rus 3–6, 6–4, [10–7]
