= 2024 Open Città della Disfida – Singles =

Singles
- 2024 Open Città della Disfida

Final
- Champion: (Bosnia and Herzegovina) Damir Džumhur
- Runner-up: (France) Harold Mayot
- Score: 6–1, 6–3

Events
Singles	Doubles
- Open Città della Disfida

Shintaro Mochizuki was the defending champion but chose not to defend his title.

Damir Džumhur won the title after defeating Harold Mayot 6–1, 6–3 in the final.

== Seeds ==
1. (France) Harold Mayot (final)
2. (Bosnia and Herzegovina) Damir Džumhur (champion)
3. (Austria) Filip Misolic (second round)
4. (France) Benjamin Bonzi (second round)
5. (Italy) Stefano Travaglia (first round)
6. (Italy) Franco Agamenone (second round)
7. (Bosnia and Herzegovina) Nerman Fatić (first round)
8. (Italy) Francesco Maestrelli (quarterfinals)

== Draw ==
Key

- Q = Qualifier
- WC = Wild card
- LL = Lucky loser
- Alt = Alternate
- ITF = ITF entry
- PR = Protected ranking
- SR = Special ranking
- SE = Special exempt
- JE = Junior exempt
- JR = Junior Accelerator Programme entrant
- CO = College Accelerator Programme entrant
- NG = Next Gen Accelerator Program entrant
- w/o = Walkover
- r = Retired
- d = Defaulted

=== Finals ===
Semifinals
1	(France) Harold Mayot	6	7^{7}
WC	(Italy) Jacopo Berrettini	3	6^{3}
(Kazakhstan) Timofey Skatov	6	3	4
2	(Bosnia and Herzegovina) Damir Džumhur	1	6	6

Final
1	(France) Harold Mayot	1	3
2	(Bosnia and Herzegovina) Damir Džumhur	6	6

=== Top half ===
First round
1	(France) H Mayot	6	6
Q	Kirill Kivattsev	3	4
(Italy) Samuel Vincent Ruggeri	6	5
WC	(Georgia (country)) N Basilashvili	2	3^{r}
(Poland) M Kaśnikowski	6	7
Alt	(Italy) G Oradini	4	5
WC	(Italy) Marcello Serafini	5	6	4
6	(Italy) F Agamenone	7	2	6
4	(France) B Bonzi	7^{7}	4	6
(Czech Republic) J Veselý	6^{5}	6	2
WC	(Italy) J Berrettini	7^{8}	7
(Chinese Taipei) C-h Tseng	6^{6}	5
(Czech Republic) Z Kolář	6	6
Q	(Spain) C Gimeno Valero	2	1
Alt	(Romania) FC Jianu	3	6	6
5	(Italy) S Travaglia	6	3	0

Second round
1	(France) H Mayot	6	6
(Italy) S Vincent Ruggeri	3	0
(Poland) M Kaśnikowski	6	7^{10}
6	(Italy) F Agamenone	4	6^{8}
4	(France) B Bonzi	6	3	4
WC	(Italy) J Berrettini	3	6	6
(Czech Republic) Z Kolář	2	6	3
Alt	(Romania) FC Jianu	6	3	6

Quarterfinals
1	(France) H Mayot	7	6
(Poland) M Kaśnikowski	5	3
WC	(Italy) J Berrettini	4	6	6
Alt	(Romania) FC Jianu	6	4	4

Semifinals
1	(France) H Mayot	6	7^{7}
WC	(Italy) J Berrettini	3	6^{3}

=== Bottom half ===
First round
7	(Bosnia and Herzegovina) N Fatić	2	3
(Italy) R Bonadio	6	6
(Italy) E Dalla Valle	2	6	6
(Canada) S Diez	6	0	3
Q	(Italy) A Guerrieri	4	6	5
(Kazakhstan) T Skatov	6	4	7
Q	(Australia) Matthew Dellavedova	3	3
3	(Austria) F Misolic	6	6
8	(Italy) F Maestrelli	6	6
(Italy) F Passaro	3	2
Q	(Argentina) S Rodríguez Taverna	6^{4}	1
(Italy) R Brancaccio	7^{7}	6
(Croatia) N Serdarušić	2	3
Q	(Italy) Andrea Picchione	6	6
(Romania) M Copil	2	4
2	(Bosnia and Herzegovina) D Džumhur	6	6

Second round
(Italy) R Bonadio	6	6
(Italy) E Dalla Valle	1	3
(Kazakhstan) T Skatov	6	6
3	(Austria) F Misolic	4	3
8	(Italy) F Maestrelli	6	7^{7}
(Italy) R Brancaccio	4	6^{5}
Q	(Italy) A Picchione	4	3
2	(Bosnia and Herzegovina) D Džumhur	6	6

Quarterfinals
(Italy) R Bonadio	5	5
(Kazakhstan) T Skatov	7	7
8	(Italy) F Maestrelli	1	0
2	(Bosnia and Herzegovina) D Džumhur	6	6

Semifinals
(Kazakhstan) T Skatov	6	3	4
2	(Bosnia and Herzegovina) D Džumhur	1	6	6
