= 2015 TEAN International – Men's doubles =

Men's doubles
- 2015 TEAN International

Final
- Champions: (Germany) Tobias Kamke (Germany) Jan-Lennard Struff
- Runners-up: (Romania) Victor Hănescu (Romania) Adrian Ungur
- Score: 7–6^{(7–1)}, 4–6, [10–7]

Events
Singles	men	women
Doubles	men	women
← 2014 ·	TEAN International	· 2016 →

Antal van der Duim and Boy Westerhof are the defending champions, but chose not to participate.

== Seeds ==
1. (Germany) Tobias Kamke / (Germany) Jan-Lennard Struff (champions)
2. (Poland) Tomasz Bednarek / (France) Fabrice Martin (semifinals)
3. (Romania) Alexandru-Daniel Carpen / (United Kingdom) Darren Walsh (first round)
4. (Netherlands) Sander Arends / (Netherlands) Romano Frantzen (semifinals)

== Draw ==
=== Key ===
- Q = Qualifier
- WC = Wild card
- LL = Lucky loser
- Alt = Alternate
- SE = Special exempt
- PR = Protected ranking
- ITF = ITF entry
- JE = Junior exempt
- w/o = Walkover
- r = Retired
- d = Defaulted
- SR = Special ranking

First round
1	(Germany) T Kamke (Germany) J-L Struff	6	6
(Brazil) E Dischinger (Poland) G Panfil	4	4
WC	(Netherlands) Bobbie De Goeijen (Netherlands) T Griekspoor	6	6
(Italy) R Bellotti (Austria) D Novak	3	1
4/WC	(Netherlands) S Arends (Netherlands) Romano Frantzen	6	3	[13]
WC	(Netherlands) J Sels (Netherlands) Vincent Van den Honert	4	6	[11]
(Estonia) V Ivanov (Belarus) A Vasilevski	6	6
(Belgium) G Gigounon (France) T Lamasine	4	2
(France) M Chazal (France) C Lestienne	4	4
(Netherlands) S Fransen (Netherlands) J Huta Galung	6	6
(Romania) V Hănescu (Romania) A Ungur	6	7
3	(Romania) Alexandru-Daniel Carpen (United Kingdom) D Walsh	4	5
(France) C Hemery (France) J Inzerillo	5	4
(Czech Republic) M Michalička (Slovakia) Adrian Sikora	7	6
(Belgium) J Cagnina (Belgium) A De Greef	1	2
2	(Poland) T Bednarek (France) F Martin	6	6

Quarterfinals
1	(Germany) T Kamke (Germany) J-L Struff	6	3	[10]
WC	(Netherlands) B De Goeijen (Netherlands) T Griekspoor	2	6	[7]
4/WC	(Netherlands) S Arends (Netherlands) R Frantzen	6	6
(Estonia) V Ivanov (Belarus) A Vasilevski	2	2
(Netherlands) S Fransen (Netherlands) J Huta Galung	3	6^{6}
(Romania) V Hănescu (Romania) A Ungur	6	7^{8}
(Czech Republic) M Michalička (Slovakia) A Sikora	3	6^{6}
2	(Poland) T Bednarek (France) F Martin	6	7^{8}

Semifinals
1	(Germany) T Kamke (Germany) J-L Struff	6	6
4/WC	(Netherlands) S Arends (Netherlands) R Frantzen	4	4
(Romania) V Hănescu (Romania) A Ungur	1	6	[10]
2	(Poland) T Bednarek (France) F Martin	6	4	7

Final
1	(Germany) T Kamke (Germany) J-L Struff	7^{7}	3	[10]
(Romania) V Hănescu (Romania) A Ungur	6^{1}	6	[7]
