= Damir Džumhur =

Bosnian tennis player (born 1992)

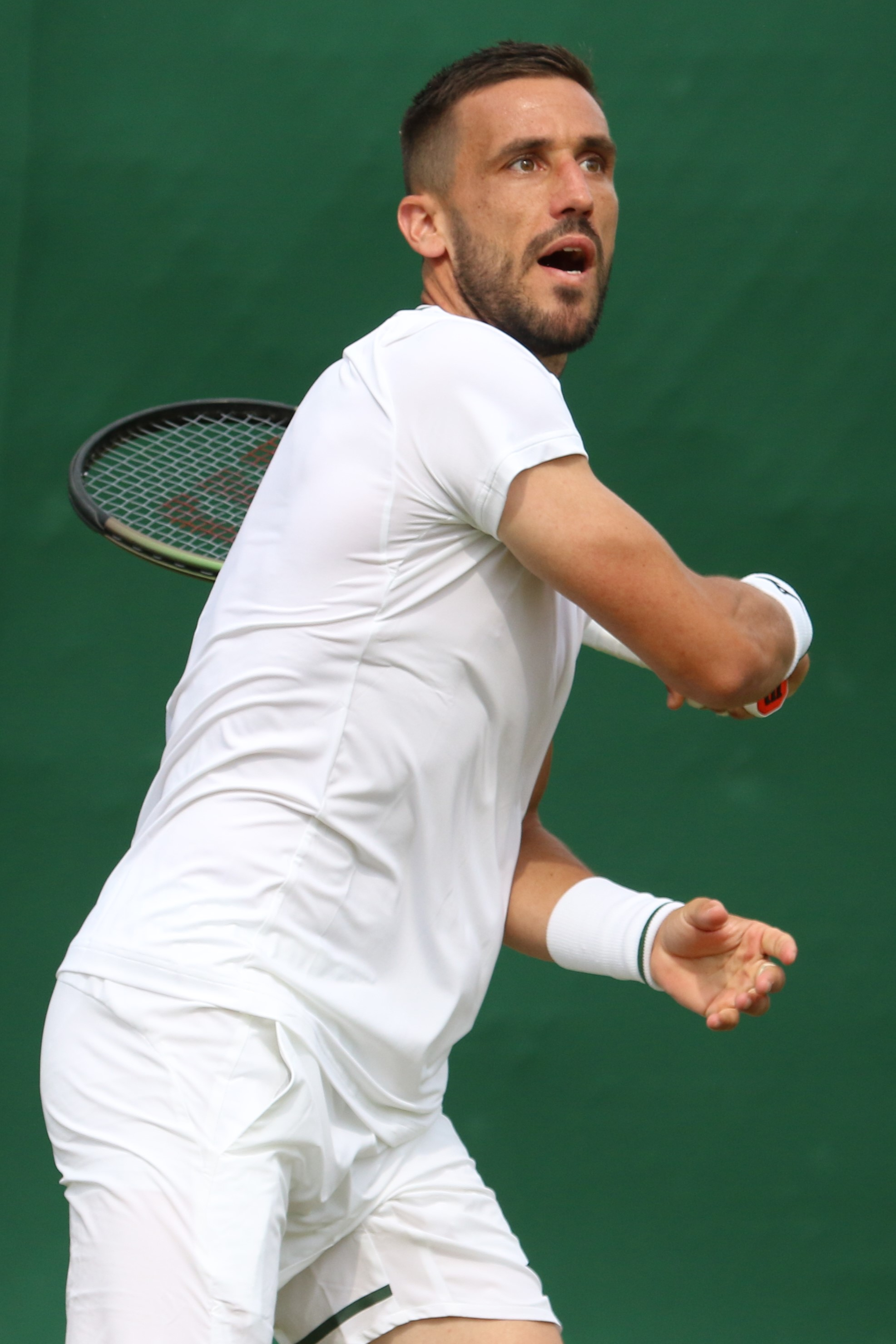
- Džumhur at the 2023 Wimbledon Championships
- ITF name: Damir Džumhur
- Country (sports): Bosnia and Herzegovina
- Residence: Sarajevo, Bosnia and Herzegovina; Belgrade, Serbia
- Born: 20 May 1992 (age 34) Sarajevo, Bosnia and Herzegovina
- Height: 1.75 m (5 ft 9 in)
- Turned pro: 2011
- Plays: Right-handed (two-handed backhand)
- Coach: Antonio Šančić
- Prize money: US $7,877,015

Singles
- Career record: 161–189
- Career titles: 3
- Highest ranking: No. 23 (2 July 2018)
- Current ranking: No. 90 (9 November 2026)

Grand Slam singles results
- Australian Open: 3R (2014, 2018)
- French Open: 3R (2015, 2018, 2025)
- Wimbledon: 2R (2016, 2017, 2018)
- US Open: 3R (2017)

Other tournaments
- Olympic Games: 1R (2016)

Doubles
- Career record: 18–53
- Career titles: 0
- Highest ranking: No. 117 (13 August 2018)
- Current ranking: No. 606 (31 August 2026)

Grand Slam doubles results
- Australian Open: 2R (2025)
- French Open: 2R (2018)
- Wimbledon: 1R (2015, 2018, 2025)
- US Open: 1R (2017, 2018, 2025)

Team competitions
- Davis Cup: Europe/Africa Zone Group I 2nd round (2017)
Medal record
Representing Bosnia and Herzegovina
Youth Olympic Games
Bronze medal – third place	2010 Singapore	Singles
European Junior Championships 18 & Under
Gold medal – first place	2010 Klosters	Singles
- Last updated on: 30 November 2026.

Damir Džumhur (Bosnian pronunciation: [dǎːmir dʒûmxur] JOOM-hoor; born 20 May 1992) is a Bosnian professional tennis player. His career-best singles ATP ranking of World No. 23, achieved on 2 July 2018, makes him the highest-ranked tennis player from Bosnia and Herzegovina. He is currently Bosnia and Herzegovina's No. 1 player.

By winning the 2017 St. Petersburg Open singles tournament, Džumhur became the first player competing under the Bosnia and Herzegovina flag to claim an ATP Tour title. He added also a triumph at the 2017 Kremlin Cup and became the first player in tennis history to win both events played on Russian soil in the same season. Džumhur is also the first male player to represent Bosnia and Herzegovina in the main draw of any Grand Slam.

He is a member of the Bosnia and Herzegovina Davis Cup team, and he competed at the 2016 Summer Olympics, being selected as the first male tennis player from his country to do so.

As a junior, he was ranked world No. 3 and he was a bronze medallist at the 2010 Youth Olympic Games.

== Early life ==
Džumhur was born in Sarajevo as a first child to Nerfid and Žaneta Džumhur. His birth in a maternity hospital located near the Zetra Olympic Hall came shortly after the outbreak of the Bosnian War. The arena was destroyed at the time, but it was the same place where Damir would start practicing tennis.

As a child, Džumhur practised skiing and football in addition to tennis. Growing up, he admired Patrick Rafter and Roger Federer, and he is also a keen football fan and supports the Bosnian team FK Željezničar.

From the beginning, Džumhur was coached by his father Nerfid, who was running a tennis school since 1994. He started playing tennis at the age of five and began practicing professionally in 1999 after the renovated Zetra Olympic Hall reopened.

== Junior career ==
In his early years, he participated in local events, mainly in Bosnia and Herzegovina, Croatia and Serbia and Montenegro. His first major success came in 2004 when he won the unofficial U–12 European Championships in Rome. That year, he played a total of nine tournaments, winning all of them and dropping only four sets in the process.

Before turning 18, Džumhur competed in various tournaments held across the continent and organized by Tennis Europe. He finished the 2005 and 2006 seasons ranked 87th and 25th respectively in Europe's under-14 boys' singles rankings, and in the years 2007 and 2008, he finished as the 13th- and 17th-ranked player in the under-16 category.

In 2008, Džumhur started competing in official ITF junior tournaments in the under-18 category. In that year, he played six tournaments in total, winning one and reaching the final of another. He closed his first season at this level with 17 wins and 5 losses, and was ranked 299th in the world for juniors. The following season Džumhur participated in 20 such events, winning two titles, and with a 45–17 win–loss record, he finished ranked 35th. However, he was not ranked by ITF in those two years due to insufficient appearances in premier events.

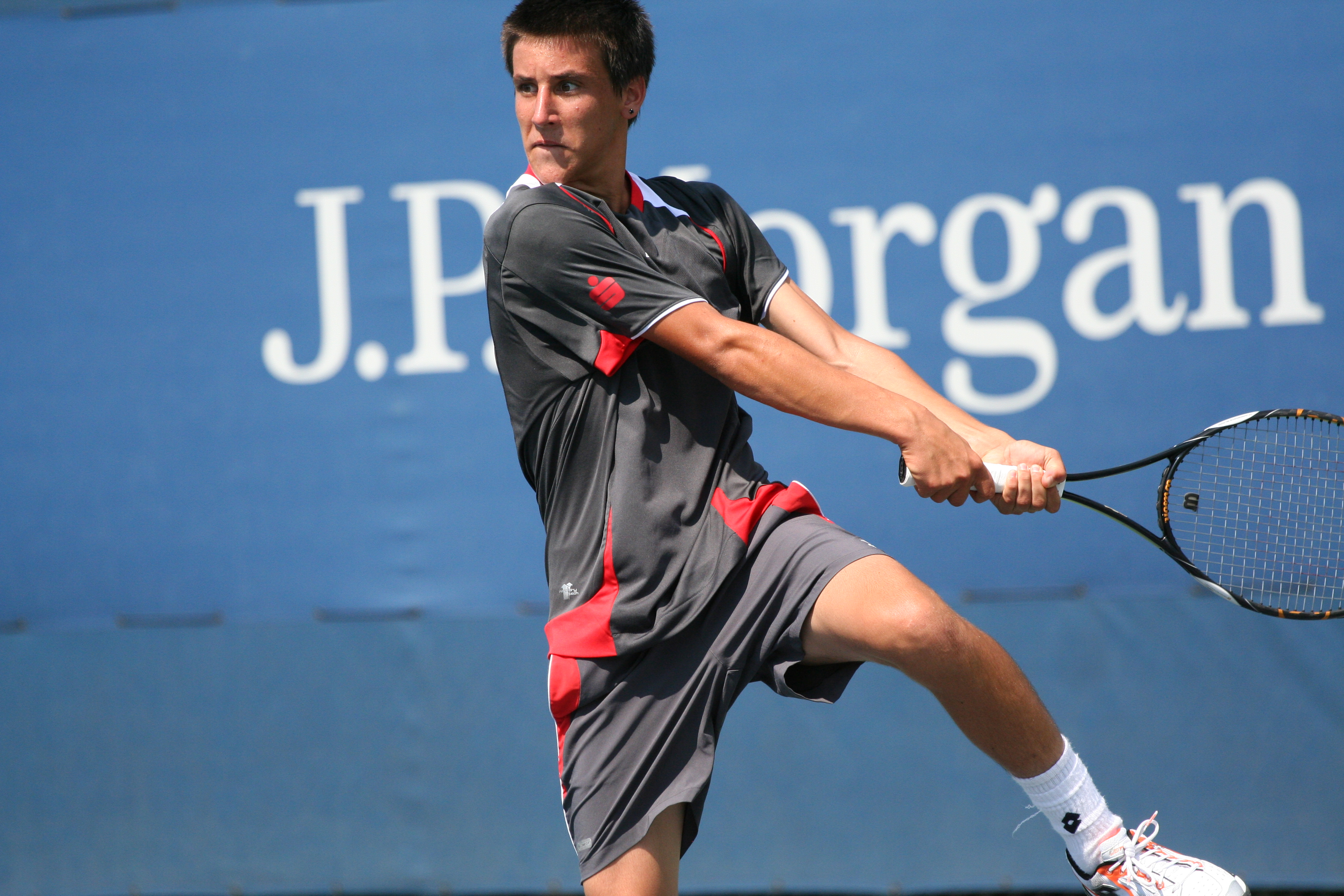
Džumhur during his last Junior Grand Slam, at the 2010 US Open

In 2010, Džumhur played in 12 tournaments, four of which he claimed. That includes the triumph in the U–18 European Championships in Klosters, after beating Andrés Artuñedo Martínavarro in straight sets in the final.

In August 2010, by defeating Victor Baluda, Džumhur won the bronze medal in singles event at the 2010 Summer Youth Olympics in Singapore, where he was also a country representative during the Opening Ceremony as a flag bearer for Bosnia and Herzegovina. That year he appeared in his only three junior Grand Slam events, where he achieved a second round finish at the Roland Garros, a quarterfinal finish at the Wimbledon Championships and a third round finish at the US Open in singles competitions and also a Quarterfinal, second round and Quarterfinal finish in doubles, respectively. In July 2010 Džumhur was placed third on the ITF world rankings, and he finished this year on 4th place with 40 singles wins and 8 losses.

Junior Grand Slam results – Singles:

Australian Open: – (-)
French Open: 2R (2010)
Wimbledon: QF (2010)
US Open: 3R (2010)

Junior Grand Slam results – Doubles:

Australian Open: – (-)
French Open: QF (2010)
Wimbledon: 2R (2010)
US Open: QF (2010)

== Professional career ==
=== 2010: Davis Cup debut ===
Džumhur played his first two matches in Davis Cup for Bosnia and Herzegovina, winning both of them in matches against Estonia and Portugal.

=== 2011: Turned pro ===
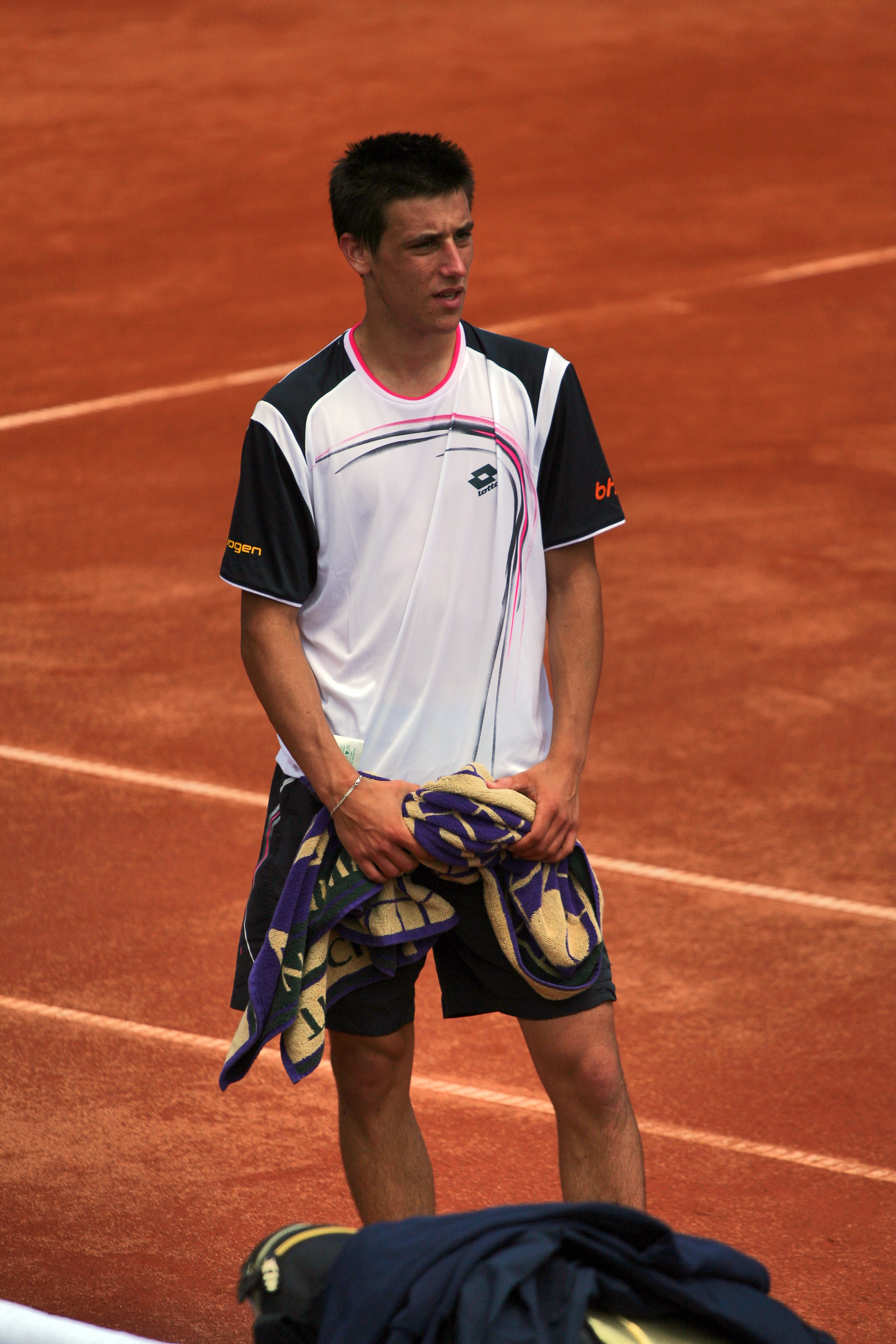
2012 Košice Open, during Quarterfinal match with Miloslav Mečíř Jr.

Džumhur turned professional in 2011, making his debut at the ATP World Tour in Zagreb during qualifying for the 2011 PBZ Zagreb Indoors.

He ended his first fully professional season ranked World No. 339.

=== 2012–2013: First pro years, top 200 debut ===
He spent his first years as a pro mainly on the ATP Challenger Tour and in ITF Men's Circuit tournaments. He won twelve singles and eight doubles Futures titles overall, as well as reaching the finals twice in Challenger events – the 2013 Košice Open and 2013 Poznań Open, losing in three sets on both occasions to Mikhail Kukushkin and Andreas Haider-Maurer respectively. In that period Džumhur took part in four Davis Cup ties involving Bosnia and Herzegovina, playing in total of eight rubbers, winning in two singles and one doubles matches.

He ended the 2012 season inside the Top 250.

In 2013, Džumhur climbed into the top 200 in the world singles rankings, first achieved on 19 August 2013, and eventually he finished the year at World No. 187.

=== 2014: Closing in on Top 100 ===
In January 2014, Džumhur became the first male Bosnian representative to play in the main draw of a Grand Slam, having reached the third round of the 2014 Australian Open, where he eventually lost to 7th seed Tomáš Berdych. On the way to this stage, Džumhur defeated Dustin Brown, Niels Desein, Ruben Bemelmans in qualifying competition, before winning against Jan Hájek, and 32nd seeded Ivan Dodig. He received praise from Berdych and Novak Djokovic after the tournament.

Džumhur then played for his country in Davis Cup first round match against Greece, where he lost in four sets to Markos Kalovelonis, ranked No. 691 at the time. However, in his next match he came back from two sets down and won against Alexandros Jakupovic, sealing a 3–1 victory for Bosnia and Herzegovina over Greece. This was then followed by a series of unsuccessful appearances in a combination of World Tour and Challenger Tour events across Europe and the United States, where Džumhur made his debut in ATP World Tour Masters 1000 cycle, having played in the qualifying of the Indian Wells Masters and the Miami Masters, where he won his sole eight points during that period. He finished his first hard-court part of the season by helping his country beat Finland in the 2014 Davis Cup Group II second round.

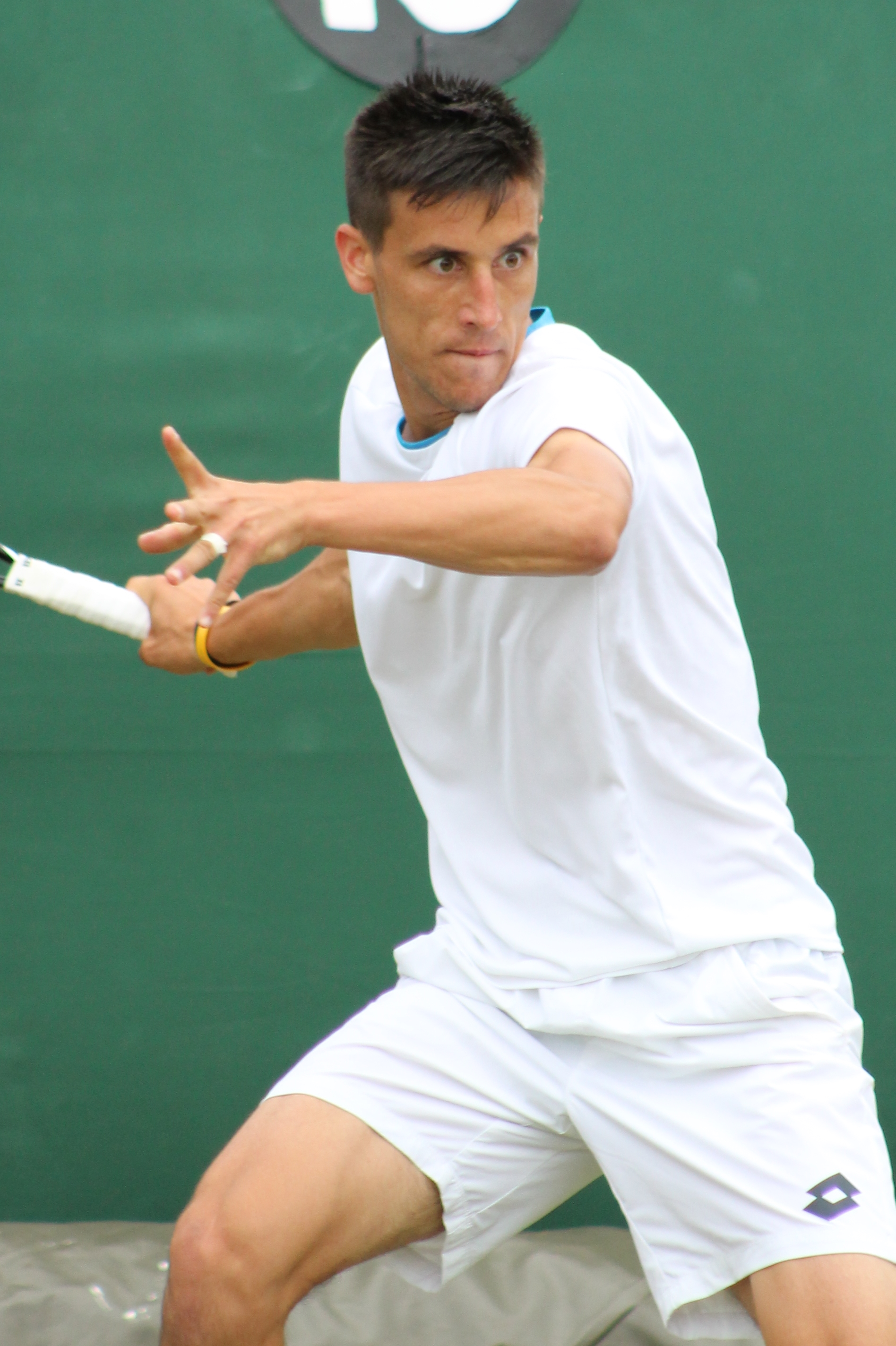
Džumhur during 2014 Wimbledon Championships

Džumhur opened his clay campaign by winning 2014 Mersin Cup – his first Challenger tournament in his career. On the way to this triumph, he defeated Guillaume Rufin, Egor Gerasimov, Thomas Fabbiano and Matteo Viola in straight sets. That was followed by a win over Pere Riba in the final match, which allowed him to achieve career-high singles ranking. Džumhur became only the second player (after Amer Delić), who has ever won a Challenger tournament under the Bosnian flag. In May that year, at 2014 Roland Garros, he qualified for a second straight Grand Slam tournament, where he lost in the first round to 26th seed Feliciano López. Straight after, he went on to win his second Challenger title, at 2014 BRD Arad Challenger, in Romania, by beating Pere Riba again in the final which moved him into the top 110 in the ATP rankings.

Later in June, Džumhur took part in his only matches of the season that were played on grass, losing both of them in three sets – to Ante Pavić in singles and to Gero Kretschmer and Alexander Satschko in doubles, during the 2014 Wimbledon Championships qualifying event.

During his clay-court season, Džumhur won in Italy his third title of the season at 2014 San Benedetto Tennis Cup, by beating Andreas Haider-Maurer in the final in straight sets. That gave him his first ever direct entry into the main draw of a Grand Slam tournament – the 2014 US Open. He was defeated in the first round by David Ferrer, who was ranked No. 5 at that time, losing in four sets. A week before the start of the US Open, Džumhur qualified for the first time in his career to an ATP World Tour event, which was the 2014 Winston-Salem Open, played on hardcourt, where he lost in two sets to Adrian Mannarino.

His last Davis Cup appearance of the season ended in a three-set defeat to Ričardas Berankis, which sealed victory for Lithuania and left Bosnia and Herzegovina in Group II of the Europe/Africa Zone.

In Autumn 2014 Džumhur was unsuccessful in his hardcourt appearances, however he twice achieved his career-high ranking of 101. On both occasions he was one point short of entering the ATP top 100, and would've become the first male Bosnian player to be ranked there. He eventually finished that season on 109th place, and thus did not achieve his goal, set in August, of finishing the year in the top 100, and did not gain direct entry into the first Grand Slam tournament of the new season – the 2015 Australian Open, but he fulfilled his initial wish of being ranked in the top 150 at the end of the year.

=== 2015: Breakthrough on the ATP Tour ===
Džumhur began the new season in India, where he was unsuccessful in his bid to qualify for the main draw of the 2015 Aircel Chennai Open, losing to Luca Vanni in the final qualifying round. For the first time in his career, he also took part in the main doubles draw of an ATP World Tour level tournament, playing alongside Aljaž Bedene. Later in January he failed to qualify for the Australian Open, after a three set loss to Tim Pütz in the second qualifying round, while being the top seed in the draw. After the Australian Open, Džumhur managed to win his first career singles match at ATP World Tour level at the 2015 PBZ Zagreb Indoors, against Michael Berrer, in three sets, after saving two match points, before falling to third seed Guillermo García López in two sets. It was also the first ATP 250 series tournament in Džumhur's career where he had direct entry.

Right after the Croatian event, Džumhur went to the Dominican Republic, where he won the first edition of 2015 Milex Open, played on green clay in Santo Domingo, and became the first player to ever win a professional tennis tournament in that country. Džumhur did not lose a set on his way to the title and spent less than five and a half hours on court in total during the tournament. He won the final against Renzo Olivo by retirement. This followed wins over Benjamin Balleret, Bastian Trinker, Nicolás Jarry and Cristian Garín. Džumhur was then accepted into the main draw of the 2015 Morelos Open, as a special exempt, where he managed to win four more matches, bringing his tally to nine consecutive wins, and reaching his second consecutive final at Challenger level, and his first played on hardcourt. He lost to Víctor Estrella Burgos, but his semifinal win against Adrián Menéndez Maceiras, where he saved two match points, placed him in the top 100 of the ATP rankings, which made Džumhur the first male representative of Bosnia and Herzegovina to do so, and also the highest ranked player in a singles ranking list competing under the Bosnian flag (surpassing Mervana Jugic-Salkić's No. 99 ranking from June 2004).

In March, he played in his debut ATP Masters 1000 tournament, at 2015 Miami Open, where he lost in three sets to James Duckworth after successfully passing through qualifying. With this event, Džumhur had completed the first hardcourt part of his season.

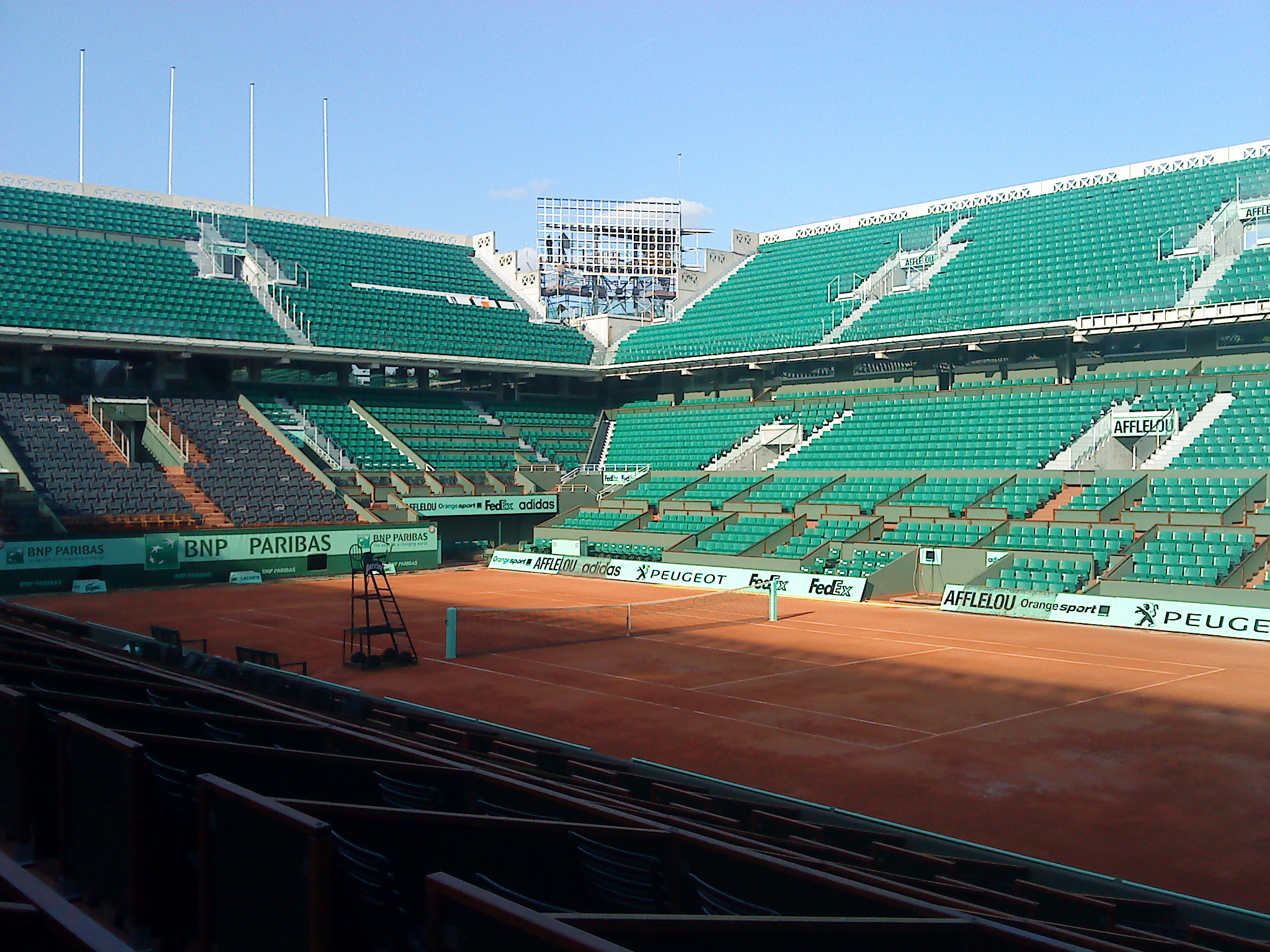
Court Philippe Chatrier, in Paris, where Džumhur played his 3rd round match versus Roger Federer during 2015 Roland Garros

At the beginning of April, Džumhur won three consecutive ATP World Tour 250 matches against Paul-Henri Mathieu, Marcel Granollers and Andreas Haider-Maurer at 2015 Grand Prix Hassan II in Casablanca, which gave him his first ever semifinal appearance at this level, and his ranking subsequently increased to 85th. He became the first Bosnian player, who has reached the semifinals of a World Tour event, before losing in three sets to second seed Martin Kližan.

In May, Džumhur improved his career-best singles and doubles rankings, by reaching 81st and 342nd positions, respectively. Later that month he made headlines again after reaching third round at the French Open, where he lost to world No. 2 Roger Federer. After the match, Džumhur received approval from the Swiss, as well as described his pre-match feeling on facing his childhood idol as "dreaming". In the earlier stages of the tournament, Džumhur defeated Mikhail Youzhny, after the Russian retired while trailing by two sets, and defeated Marcos Baghdatis in four sets.

Džumhur prepared to play on grass courts in Liverpool, where he was invited to play in the Liverpool Hope University International Tennis Tournament, an exhibition. After playing a total of four singles matches, he was named as a joint runner-up, together with Pablo Andújar. Džumhur was drawn against Federer in his first ever main draw appearance at Wimbledon, and he lost to the eventual runner-up in straight sets. For the first time in his career, Džumhur competed in the doubles main draw at a Grand Slam event – playing alongside Aljaž Bedene, they were defeated by Steve Johnson and Sam Querrey, also in straight sets.

During his summer clay court season, Džumhur advanced to his first doubles Challenger final, at the 2015 Sparkassen Open, playing together with Franko Škugor, which gave him his career-high doubles ranking. A couple of unsuccessful singles appearances at Challenger level caused Džumhur to drop to 100th place on the ATP singles list, which was still enough to gain direct entry to the US Open. Džumhur's lost in the fourth round there in four sets against 24th seed Bernard Tomic.

After 50 days without a win, Džumhur managed to win five consecutive matches in five days at the TEAN International, losing two sets in the process and winning his fifth Challenger title, defeating home player Igor Sijsling in three sets. He later went to Morocco to play three clay Challengers in Kenitra, Mohammedia and Casablanca, winning the last one by defeating Daniel Muñoz de la Nava in a three-set final, which gave him his highest ever ranking of 77th.

He eventually finished his 2015 season ranked 82nd, after a series of failed attempts at clay court South American Challengers during the months of October and November. Like the year before, Džumhur had not achieved his goal of reaching the top 70, but managed to fulfil the initial one, ranking inside the top 100, allowing him to be directly accepted into the 2016 Australian Open.

=== 2016: Maiden Top 10 wins ===
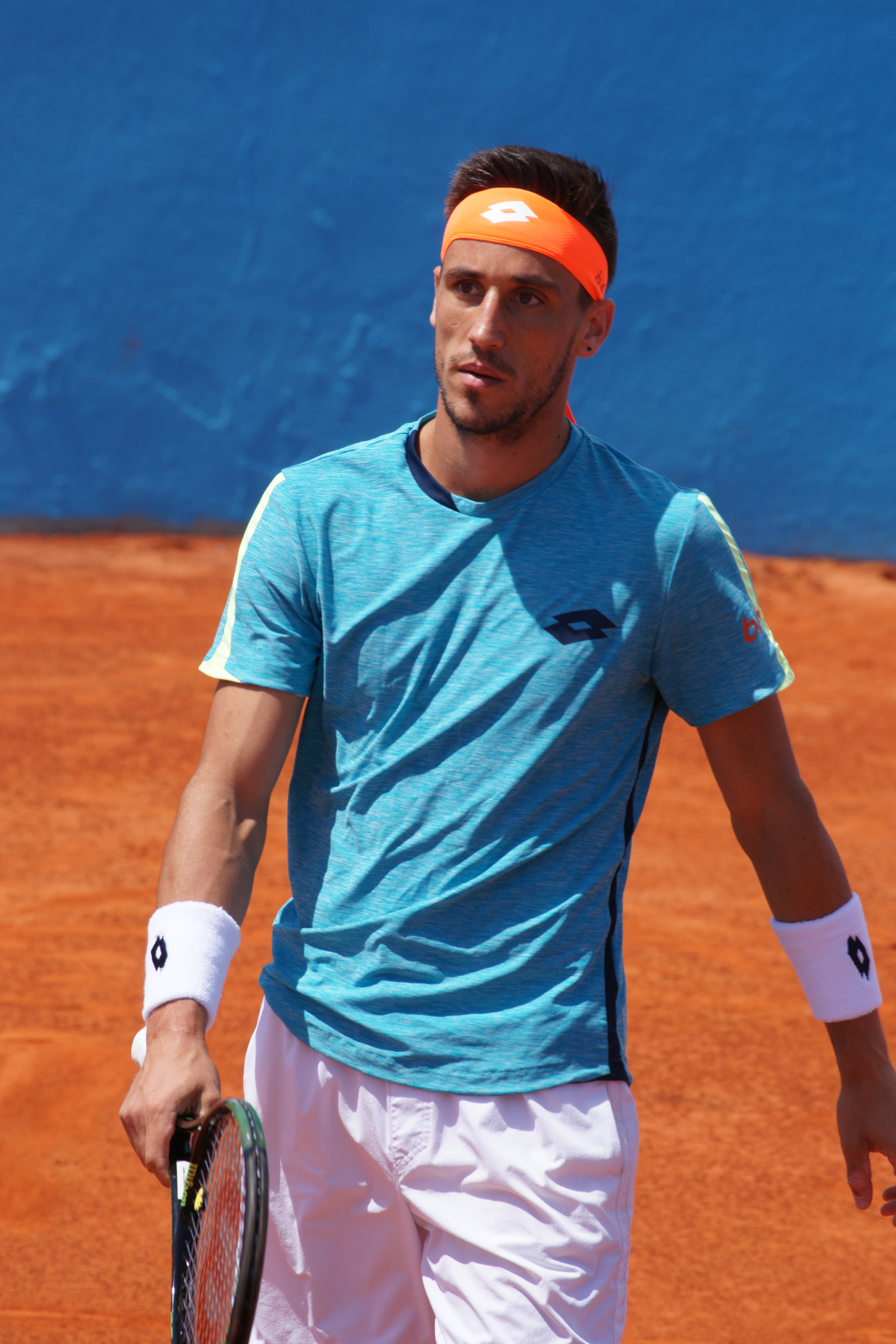
Džumhur at the 2016 Open de Nice Côte d'Azur

Džumhur started the new season in Doha at the 2016 Qatar ExxonMobil Open. He defeated Marco Cecchinato before losing to Tomáš Berdych in straight sets. He later moved to Australia, where he was defeated in the 2016 Apia International Sydney qualifying by Maximilian Marterer, and then was drawn to face Kyle Edmund in the first round of the Australian Open. He came back to defeat him in five sets and then faced 15th seed David Goffin, losing in four sets.

He later took part in a series of two indoor and then two outdoor hard court events across Europe and North America, losing in the second rounds in Sofia, Memphis and Delray Beach before losing to Dominic Thiem in the first round of 2016 Abierto Mexicano Telcel in Acapulco, the first ATP World Tour 500 series tournament in which Džumhur participated in the main draw.

Džumhur began the month of March in Indian Wells, being crushed by Marcel Granollers in the first round, losing twelve consecutive games. After a second round exit at the 2016 Jalisco Open, he returned to the United States to play another Masters 1000 event, the 2016 Miami Open. In the opening round Džumhur defeated Leonardo Mayer, which was his third win over a top 50 player, and his first in which the opponent did not retire, and first singles triumph at this level. In his second match he faced former world No. 1 Rafael Nadal, ranked 5th at the time, who retired when Džumhur was serving while leading in set three - this match was Džumhur's first ever top 10 win. He then defeated Mikhail Kukushkin in the third round, before losing to Milos Raonic in the Round of 16, finishing the first part of the season ranked 87th.

His clay court season started in Roquebrune-Cap-Martin, where Džumhur played in 2016 Monte-Carlo Rolex Masters. After qualifying, he beat Robin Haase and world No. 7 Tomáš Berdych, achieving his second win against top 10 opponents and improving his head-to-head record with the Czech to 1–2. He was then defeated by Milos Raonic, being two points away from reaching the quarterfinals. He then took part in two consecutive ATP World Tour 250 series tournaments in Bucharest and Istanbul, losing to Marco Cecchinato in the second round, and to Diego Schwartzman in the quarterfinals, respectively, despite having a match point in the latter match. Later he qualified for another Masters 1000 event that season, losing in the first round of the 2016 Internazionali BNL d'Italia to Jérémy Chardy in three sets, while in the meantime he managed to improve his career-best ranking to 71.

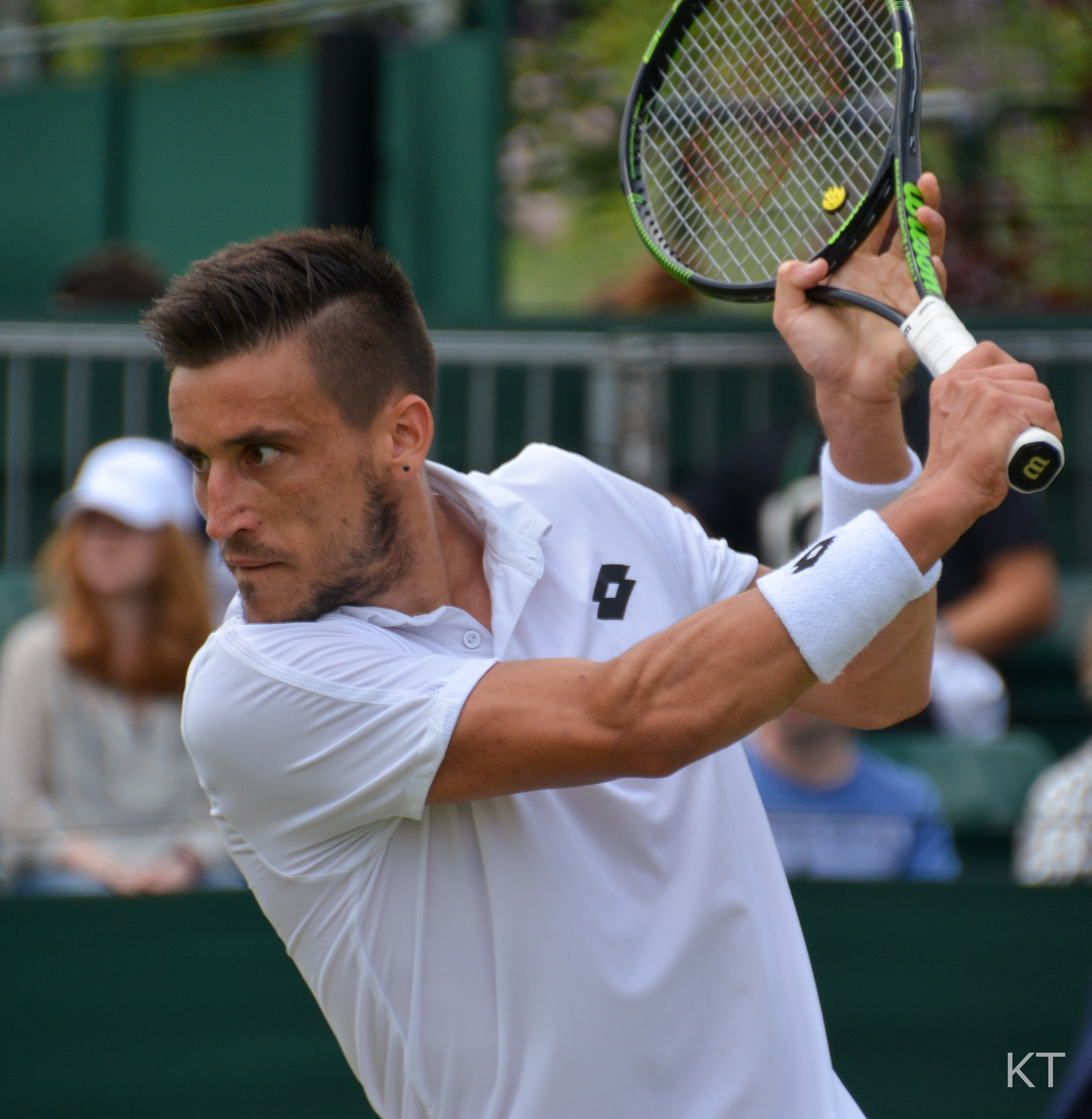
Džumhur at the 2016 Wimbledon Championships

In Roland Garros he was eliminated in the first round, being defeated in four sets by João Sousa. His fourth successive loss came in the opening round of a Challenger circuit event – 2016 UniCredit Czech Open where he retired due to right ankle injury. It was the last tournament he played before the grass season.

On 9 June Džumhur received a Tripartite Commission Invitation, which gave him the right to represent Bosnia and Herzegovina at the 2016 Summer Olympics, as the first male tennis player to do so in the country's history. On July 19, 2016, Džumhur was confirmed as a direct entrant to the men's singles draw, due to the withdrawal of several players from the Games. Hence, his invitation was transferred to a fellow Bosnian tennis player, Mirza Bašić.

For the second year running Džumhur took part in the Liverpool International Tennis Tournament played in June in Liverpool, and after winning both of his singles matches, including the Sunday final against Paolo Lorenzi, he was crowned champion. Džumhur then continued his 2016 Wimbledon Championships preparations at the 2016 Aegon Open Nottingham, beating in three sets the title-holder Denis Istomin, with the match being suspended after the second set due to darkness, and then losing on the same day to Vasek Pospisil. The triumph against Istomin was his first recorded professional grass court win. Džumhur then competed at the third major of the year in London. He won his first round match by defeating Denis Kudla in five sets before losing to Pierre-Hugues Herbert in round two.

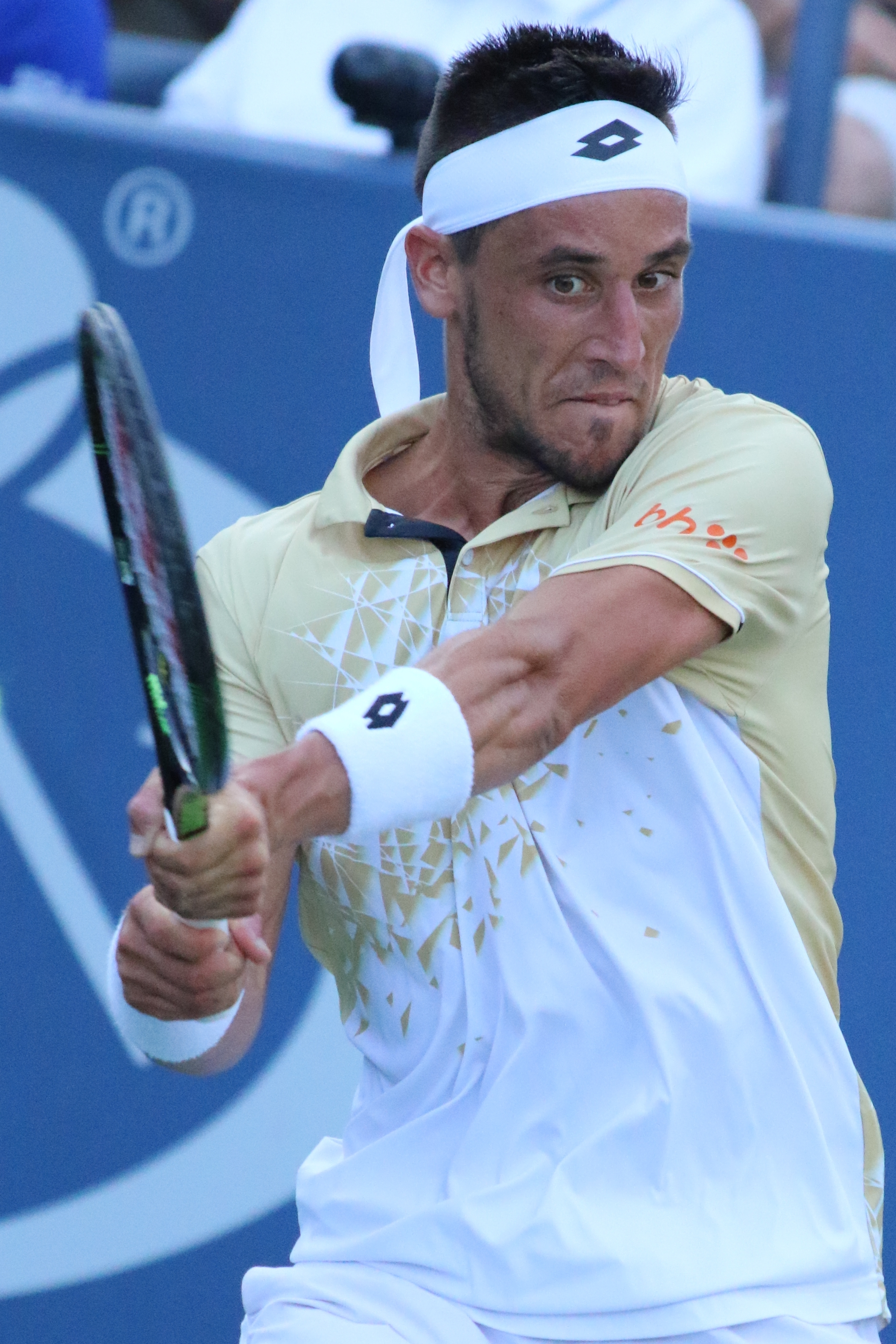
Džumhur during his 2016 US Open match against Tomic

In July Džumhur won both singles rubbers he played for Bosnia and Herzegovina in a 3–1 victory against Turkey, helping his country progress to the promotional play-offs. Then, he played his last clay court ATP World Tour event of the season in Umag, defeating Nicolás Almagro and Thomas Fabbiano before losing a three-set quarterfinal battle with Fabio Fognini.

Džumhur's maiden participation at the Summer Olympics ended in the first round as he was defeated by Dudi Sela in two sets. The match was overshadowed by an incident with Israeli spectators abusing Islam and Bosnia, particularly Džumhur, accusing him of being Muslim, which he denied. It caused a match suspension as the chair umpire Gianluca Moscarella had to intervene on the stands separating Džumhur's coach & father Nerfid from Sela's fans. His poor form continued in the United States, where Džumhur lost in the first matches in both of the tournaments he entered as a build-up to the 2016 US Open, namely in the Western & Southern Open and the Winston-Salem Open. After four consecutive losses, Džumhur upset the 17th seed Bernard Tomic in the first round of the US Open, which was a repeat of the match they played the previous year, marking his first ever win at the US Open. He was then however defeated by Illya Marchenko in straight sets.

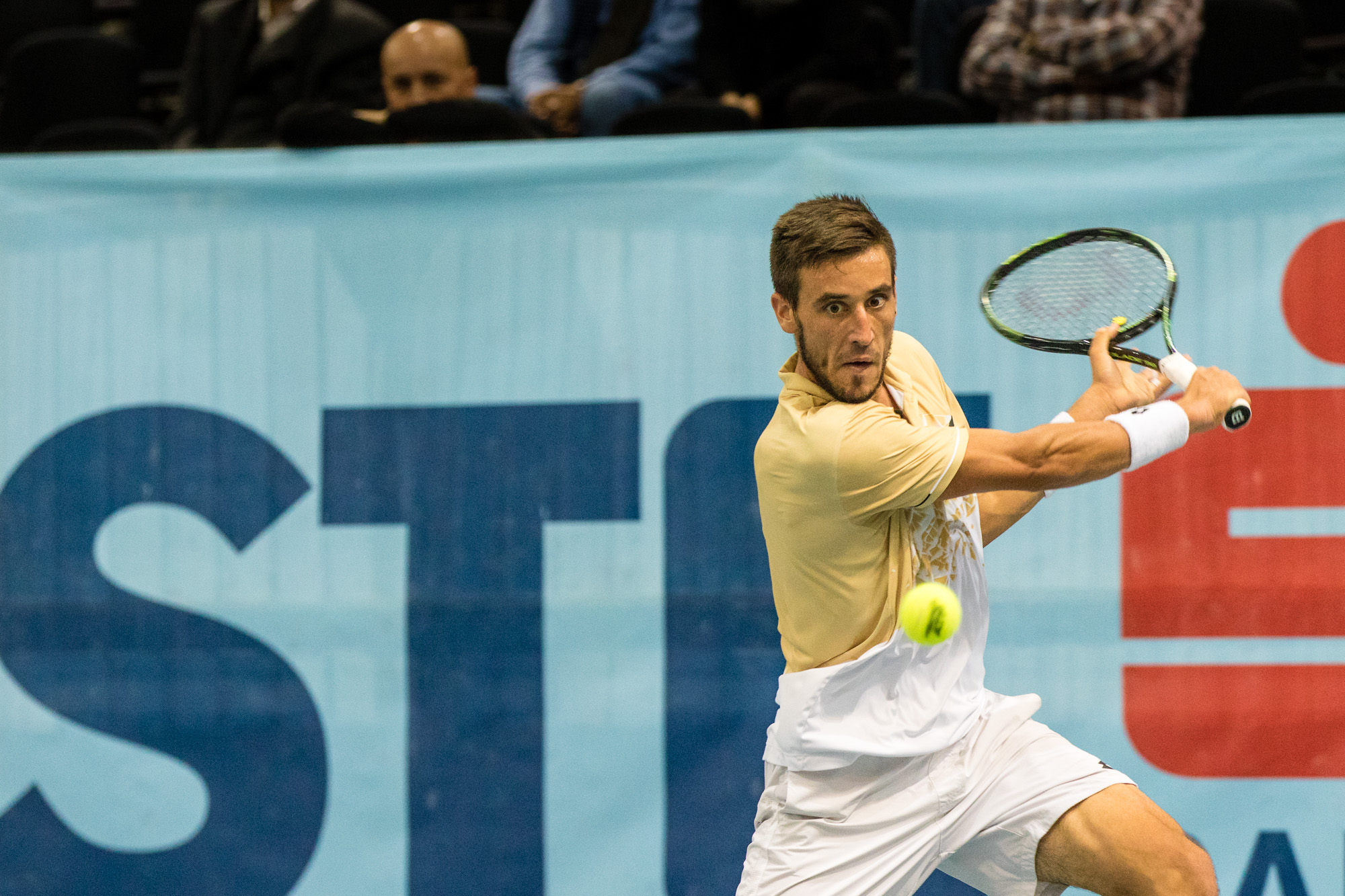
Džumhur versus Adam Pavlásek during ATP Vienna qualifying

After reaching the semifinals at the TEAN International, where Džumhur was forced to retire in the third set due to a right shoulder injury, he helped his national team to win 5–0 a Davis Cup tie against Lithuania in Vilnius, winning against Laurynas Grigelis in straight sets, which helped Bosnia and Herzegovina progress to the Europe/Africa Zone Group I for the very first time. Immediately after, Džumhur went on to play at the 2016 Moselle Open, losing to Guillermo García López in the opening round, worsening their head-to-head record to 0–3. Then, Džumhur headed to Morocco to play his last two clay-court Challengers. Despite being the top seed in both of them, he lost early to lower-ranked opponents, dropping out of the top 90 before entering the last phase of the season, a series of hardcourt indoor European tournaments.

Firstly, at the 2016 Kremlin Cup he came back from a 1–4 deficit in the third set versus Karen Khachanov to win 6–4, despite the Russian serving for the match twice, and progressed to the second round where he was forced to retire against Pablo Carreño Busta due to food poisoning. Džumhur managed to reach the main draw of 2016 Erste Bank Open, recording his first ever ATP World Tour 500 level match win, defeating Nicolás Almagro in the first round. He then lost to Ivo Karlović in the final set, despite having a 5–1 lead. Džumhur concluded his season in Paris, losing in the 2016 BNP Paribas Masters qualifying to Dustin Brown. Nevertheless, after these tournaments Džumhur moved back into the top 80, where he finished the season. Again, he did not fulfill his end-of-season ranking goal (set for a top 60 finish this time), however he maintained his career trend of closing every single season higher than the previous one.

He ended the 2016 season at No. 77 in the rankings. On 15 December Džumhur was named by Nezavisne novine readers as Bosnian Athlete of the Year and was presented with the award at the ceremony in Sarajevo organised by the newspaper itself and Radio and Television of Bosnia and Herzegovina.

=== 2017: Historic ATP titles & top 30 debut ===
The new season for Džumhur was opened with a straight set defeat to Dudi Sela at the Chennai Open. His poor start to the season continued in Melbourne, where he lost in the first round of the Australian Open to Viktor Troicki, coming back from two sets down before eventually losing in five. Džumhur was criticized for his attitude on court, as he was involved in an argument with the chair umpire, which caused a point penalty to be given to him. At 3–4 in the final set, Džumhur requested the supervisor to come on court, shortly before he lost his serve and allowed Troicki to serve for the match, which he did successfully. The Bosnian refused to shake the chair umpire's hand after the match.

Later he took part in the first ever Europe/Africa Zone Group I Davis Cup tie for Bosnia and Herzegovina, after the promotion won in Vilnius in the previous season, facing Poland in Zenica. Despite fitness problems, Džumhur managed to play against and defeat Hubert Hurkacz in straight sets, contributing to a 5–0 win and Bosnia's progress to the second round to face the Netherlands at home. Soon after he went on to play Sofia Open, where he was beaten in his first match by Andreas Seppi, who had been involved in a clay court Davis Cup tie in Buenos Aires only two days earlier.

Džumhur recorded his first ATP wins of the season in Memphis, where he defeated Kevin Anderson who was returning from injury, coming back from a set and a break down, and also defeated Steve Darcis in straight sets. In his fourth career ATP World Tour quarterfinal he fell to Ryan Harrison. Damir's form continued in Delray Beach as he defeated Konstantin Kravchuk and barely lost to Juan Martín del Potro, receiving appraisal for his display from the Argentinian. Džumhur then went on to play in the 2017 Dubai Tennis Championships, where he achieved his biggest career win to date, by eliminating defending champion, world No. 3 and current US Open title holder Stan Wawrinka winning 7–6, 6–3. In the second round he overcame Marcel Granollers, also in straight sets, reaching yet another quarterfinal, and his first on ATP World Tour 500 level. He was there defeated by Robin Haase in their third career meeting, worsening their head-to-head record to 2–1. Due to points won in Dubai, Džumhur broke into the top 70 for the first time, achieving a singles ranking of 67 on 6 March.

Damir's first ever win in Indian Wells, over Ryan Harrison in the opening round, gave him yet another career-high ranking improvement. Despite a second round loss to Albert Ramos Viñolas, and after a withdrawal from the 2017 Irving Tennis ClassicDžumhur was ranked 66th on 20 March. His appearance at the Miami Open ended in the second round, where he was eliminated by Nick Kyrgios, after saving five match points to win the opening match against Hyeon Chung.

On 7–9 April, Džumhur played for his Davis Cup team, fighting for a place in World Group play-offs. After defeating Thiemo de Bakker in straight sets, in he called the best match he ever played for Bosnia and Herzegovina, he faced Robin Haase in the fourth rubber, with Netherlands leading the tie by 2–1. Despite trailing by two sets to love and 0–4 in the third one Džumhur managed to level the match, only to lose eventually in five sets, ending Bosnia and Herzegovina's hopes of promotion. Damir's attitude was broadly commented on as he was involved in multiple arguments throughout the match with the chair umpire, the ITF supervisor, Haase and other members of the Dutch team.

In the months of April and May Džumhur was in poor form, playing in various ATP clay-court tournaments across Europe. Firstly he failed to progress through the Monte-Carlo Masters qualifying, but managed to play in the main draw as a lucky loser, though lost again to Robin Haase. He was then twice eliminated in the second rounds of the Budapest Open and the Istanbul Open, before losing in the first matches in Rome Masters qualifying, Nice and Roland Garros. At the end of the month he was ranked 96th and split with Serbian head coach Marko Subotić.

In June, Džumhur went back to the Challenger circuit, playing on that level for the first time since October 2016. Even though he was a top seed in Lisbon, he was defeated in the opening round by 550th ranked Daniel Muñoz de la Nava. He then moved to Blois, France where he again competed as the highest ranked player. That time he managed to win all five matches and by defeating Calvin Hemery 6–1, 6–3 in the final he claimed his seventh ATP Challenger Tour singles title, moving up to 83rd place. It was followed by the only grass appearance of the season, at the 2017 Wimbledon Championships, where Džumhur firstly notched his most convincing Grand Slam match triumph defeating Renzo Olivo 6–2, 6–0, 6–1, before falling to Aljaž Bedene in a four-set second round battle.

Next, he moved back to clay again, losing in the first rounds of the Umag and Hamburg events. August however saw him improving his form, winning 12 of 15 matches across three tournaments. Firstly he reached his second ever ATP semifinal in Los Cabos, Mexico losing to an eventual champion Sam Querrey in three sets. Then he was a runner-up in the Santo Domingo Challenger, losing to Víctor Estrella Burgos before achieving his career-best result in Winston-Salem where he defeated Denis Istomin, Gilles Simon, Horacio Zeballos, Hyeon Chung and Kyle Edmund en route to his first ATP Tour final, also becoming Bosnia's first player to reach an ATP World Tour final, where he lost to Roberto Bautista Agut. Immediately after, Džumhur entered the top 60 for the first time, climbing up to 56th place. This was followed by an appearance at the last Grand Slam event of the season, at the 2017 US Open. Džumhur managed to defeat 27th seed Pablo Cuevas and Cedrik-Marcel Stebe to reach the Round of 32 for the third time in his career, and the first at the US Open. Despite his defeat in four sets to Andrey Rublev, Damir moved up to his career-high ranking of No. 55.

On 24 September, Džumhur defeated Fabio Fognini in the final of St. Petersburg, claiming his first ever ATP World Tour title, which moved him up to 40th place on the ATP singles rankings. His form continued in China, as he reached his fourth straight ATP World Tour 250 semifinal, in Shenzhen, defeating world No. 4, Alexander Zverev, on the way moving up to world No. 36. This was followed by first round exits in Beijing and Shanghai.

On 22 October, Džumhur defeated Ričardas Berankis in a three-set final to claim the 2017 Kremlin Cup, pushing him to a new high ranking of world No. 31 the following day. He also made the doubles finals with Antonio Šančić but lost to Max Mirnyi and Philipp Oswald. He then reached the second round in Vienna, defeating Berankis again, and losing to Tsonga despite having a match point. He withdrew from Paris Masters, hence ending his most successful season to-date on an improved ranking of world No. 30, which qualified him to be a Commitment Player for 2018 season and have a seeding at the Australian Open, for the first time at any Grand Slam.

On 12 December, Džumhur was chosen as the 2017 Bosnian Sportsman of the Year.

=== 2018: Best season: Two major third rounds, third ATP title, historic top 25 ===
Džumhur started the year with a third round appearance at the 2018 Australian Open matching his best result at the tournament. He was defeated by world number 1 Rafael Nadal in straight sets. At the 2018 French Open he also reached the third round which also matched his best result at the tournament. He was defeated by world number 3 Alexander Zverev in a close 5-set battle.

On 30 June, Džumhur defeated Adrian Mannarino in the final of Antalya Open, which brought him to a historic career high for his country of world No. 23 in the singles rankings on 2 July 2018.

Džumhur made the semifinals of the Los Cabos Open where he lost to world No. 4, Juan Martín del Potro.

Džumhur ended the year with a third round appearance at the Paris Masters where he lost to world No. 2, Novak Djokovic, having lost the first set and having to retire early in the second set.

2018 was also the only year that Džumhur participated in all nine Masters 1000 events. His year-end ranking was World No. 47.

=== 2019: Four ATP quarterfinals ===
Džumhur started off the year with a straight sets loss to world No. 1, Novak Djokovic, at the 2019 Doha Open.

Džumhur made four quarterfinal appearances in 2019 at the Rotterdam Open where he defeated 3rd seed Stefanos Tsitsipas in the first round but lost to eventual champion Gaël Monfils, the Geneva Open where he defeated 5th seed Stan Wawrinka in the second round but lost to Radu Albot, the Antalya Open where he was the 5th seed and defending champion but lost to Jordan Thompson, and the Zhuhai Championships where he entered as a qualifier but lost to Adrian Mannarino.

Džumhur only recorded one major win in 2019 at the US Open where he defeated Elliot Benchetrit in the first round but lost in the second round to world No. 3, Roger Federer.

Džumhur ended the year with his first Challenger final in two years at the Slovak Open. He lost to Dennis Novak in straight sets.

=== 2020: Loss of form, out of top 100 ===
Džumhur lost in the first round of the Australian Open to 15th seed Stan Wawrinka who would go on to make the quarterfinals. He dropped out of the top 100 on 17 February 2020 to be ranked 107th.

In August, after not playing tennis for six months due to the COVID-19 pandemic, Džumhur returned to the court. He played world number one Djokovic in the first round of the US Open but lost in straight sets.

In October, Džumhur reached a Challenger final at the Sànchez-Casal Cup. He lost to Carlos Alcaraz in straight sets.

At the end of the year, Džumhur had a win-loss ratio of 2–8 on the ATP Tour and his ranking plummeted to No. 119 in the world.

=== 2021: Continued struggles, out of top 150 ===
Džumhur qualified for the Australian Open as a lucky loser but lost to James Duckworth in the first round.

At the Miami Masters, he qualified for the main draw also as a lucky loser and defeated Kevin Anderson in the first round, before losing to second seed and world No. 5, Stefanos Tsitsipas.

Džumhur made another final at the Belgrade Challenger. He lost to the top seed Roberto Carballés Baena in straight sets.

In July, Džumhur made his first quarterfinal of the year at the Croatia Open where he lost to eventual finalist Richard Gasquet.

He dropped out of the top 130, ranked 136th on 27 September 2021, his lowest since April 2014. He further dropped out of the top 150 on 8 November 2021.

=== 2022: ATP quarterfinal, Challenger finals, back to top 200 ===
He qualified for the 2022 Australian Open main draw, but lost in the first round to Pablo Andújar. After that, he reached the quarterfinals of Montpellier as a qualifier, where he lost in straight sets to Filip Krajinović, after beating fourth seed Nikoloz Basilashvili in the round of 16.

=== 2023–2024: Third French third round, record Challenger titles, back to top 100 ===
He received a wildcard for the main draw of the inaugural edition of the 2023 Banja Luka Open in his home country. He reached the quarterfinals defeating lucky loser Liam Broady, his first ATP win of the season in the first round, and seventh seed Richard Gasquet in the second round, before losing to the second seed and eventual finalist Andrey Rublev.

In April 2024, seeded second, he won his ninth Challenger at the 2024 Open Città della Disfida, defeating top seed Harold Mayot in straight sets. As a result, he returned to the top 150 in the rankings on 8 April 2024. Four months later, following two more Challenger titles in Ostrava and in Zagreb, he returned to the top 100 on 12 August 2024, for the first time since 2020. In September he won his fifth title of the season at the 2024 Istanbul Challenger. In November, Džumhur lifted his sixth straight trophy at the Maia Challenger in Portugal, a season record for the most Challenger titles, defeating Italian Francesco Passaro, which ensured his place inside the top 100, at world No. 83 in the ATP singles rankings on 2 December 2024.

=== 2025–2026: Fifth ATP final ===
At the 2025 Chile Open Džumhur reached the quarterfinals defeating sixth seed Mariano Navone. After a five-year absence Džumhur returned to the main draw of the 2025 BNP Paribas Open in Indian Wells after qualifying. In the first round he defeated Roberto Bautista Agut.

He reached the semifinals at the 2025 Croatia Open Umag, defeating Titouan Droguet, making the last four at the event on the fourth attempt and his tenth tour-level semifinal.

Džumhur reached his first ATP semifinal in a year at the 2026 Croatia Open Umag, since the 2025 edition at the tournament, after an almost a 4-hour battle defeating fourth seed and Roland Garros semifinalist Matteo Arnaldi. As a result, he returned to the top 100 in the singles rankings on 20 July 2026. In the semifinals, Džumhur secured another marathon victory, rallying past Alex Molcan in two hours and 44 minutes to book his fifth ATP final, first in over 8 years. He lost the final to Daniel Mérida in three sets after a two-hour match.

== Personal information ==
In addition to his native Bosnian, Džumhur speaks English. He studied political science at the Faculty of Political Sciences at the University of Sarajevo.

As a teenager, Džumhur acted in movies. When he was 14, he was a background actor in the Golden Bear awarded film Grbavica by Jasmila Žbanić. He also got his first significant role in the German film Snipers Valley (2007) by Rudolf Schweiger, where he played the role of the sharpshooter Duncan.

Džumhur was in a relationship with Croatian model and former Big Brother contestant Barbara Šegetin, with whom he has a son named Luka.

== Performance timelines ==
Key
W	F	SF	QF	#R	RR	Q#	P#	DNQ	A	Z#	PO	G	S	B	NMS	NTI	P	NH

(W) winner; (F) finalist; (SF) semifinalist; (QF) quarterfinalist; (#R) rounds 4, 3, 2, 1; (RR) round-robin stage; (Q#) qualification round; (P#) preliminary round; (DNQ) did not qualify; (A) absent; (Z#) Davis/Fed Cup Zonal Group (with number indication) or (PO) play-off; (G) gold, (S) silver or (B) bronze Olympic/Paralympic medal; (NMS) not a Masters tournament; (NTI) not a Tier I tournament; (P) postponed; (NH) not held; (SR) strike rate (events won / competed); (W–L) win–loss record.
To avoid confusion and double counting, these charts are updated at the conclusion of a tournament or when the player's participation has ended.

=== Singles ===
Tournament	2010	2011	2012	2013	2014	2015	2016	2017	2018	2019	2020	2021	2022	2023	2024	2025	2026	W–L	Win%
Grand Slam tournaments
Australian Open	A	A	A	Q2	3R	Q2	2R	1R	3R	1R	1R	1R	1R	Q2	Q2	1R	2R	6–10	38%
French Open	A	A	A	A	1R	3R	1R	1R	3R	1R	A	Q1	Q1	Q1	Q1	3R	1R	6–8	43%
Wimbledon	A	A	Q2	A	Q1	1R	2R	2R	2R	1R	NH	Q2	A	Q1	Q3	1R	1R	3–7	30%
US Open	A	A	Q1	Q1	1R	1R	2R	3R	1R	2R	1R	Q2	A	Q1	Q1	1R	1R	4–9	31%
Win–loss	0–0	0–0	0–0	0–0	2–3	2–3	3–4	3–4	5–4	1–4	0–2	0–1	0–1	0–0	0–0	2–4	1–4	19–34	36%
National representation
Summer Olympics	NH		A	NH			1R	NH				A	NH		A	NH		0–1	0%
Davis Cup	Z2	Z2	Z2	Z2	Z2	Z2	Z2	Z1	PO	PO	A	WG1	WG1	WG1	WG1	WG1		25–16	61%
ATP Masters 1000
Indian Wells Open	A	A	A	A	Q1	Q1	1R	2R	2R	1R	NH	A	A	A	Q1	2R	1R	2–6	25%
Miami Open	A	A	A	A	Q2	1R	4R	2R	2R	2R	NH	2R	A	A	Q1	A	2R	7–6	54%
Monte-Carlo Masters	A	A	A	A	A	A	3R	1R	1R	1R	NH	A	A	A	A	A	1R	2–5	29%
Madrid Open	A	A	A	A	A	A	A	A	2R	Q1	NH	A	A	A	A	3R	2R	4-3	60%
Italian Open	A	A	A	A	A	A	1R	Q1	2R	Q2	Q3	A	A	A	Q1	1R	2R	2–4	25%
Canadian Open	A	A	A	A	A	A	A	A	1R	A	NH	A	A	A	A	1R	A	0–2	0%
Cincinnati Open	A	A	A	A	A	A	Q1	A	1R	A	Q1	A	A	A	A	2R	A	1–2	33%
Shanghai Masters	A	A	A	A	A	A	A	1R	1R	Q2	NH			A	1R	1R	A	0–4	0%
Paris Masters	A	A	A	A	A	A	Q1	A	3R	1R	A	A	A	A	A	1R	Q1	2–3	40%
Win–loss	0–0	0–0	0–0	0–0	0–0	0–1	5–4	2–4	4–9	1–3	0–0	1–1	0–0	0–0	0–1	4–7	3–5	20–35	36%
Career statistics
	2010	2011	2012	2013	2014	2015	2016	2017	2018	2019	2020	2021	2022	2023	2024	2025	2026	Career	
Tournaments	0	0	0	0	4	9	22	25	31	21	8	5	4	2	3	26		160	
Titles	0	0	0	0	0	0	0	2	1	0	0	0	0	0	0	0		3	
Finals reached	0	0	0	0	0	0	0	3	1	0	0	0	0	0	0	0		4	
Hard Win–loss	0–0	0–1	0–2	1–0	4–5	2–3	12–14	33–16	15–20	8–15	2–8	2–4	2–3	0–3	1–3	6–12		88–109	45%
Clay Win–loss	2–0	0–0	0–0	1–1	0–1	6–5	9–6	2–7	5–9	3–4	0–0	2–2	3–1	2–1	1–2	15–12		51–51	50%
Grass Win–loss	0–0	0–0	0–0	0–0	0–0	0–1	2–2	1–1	5–2	2–2	0–0	0–0	0–0	0–0	0–0	0–3		10–11	48%
Carpet Win–loss	0–0	0–0	0–0	0–0	1–1	0–0	0–0	0–0	0–0	0–0	0–0	0–0	0–0	0–0	0–0	0–0		1–1	50%
Overall win–loss	2–0	0–1	0–2	2–1	5–7	8–9	23–22	36–24	25–31	13–21	2–8	4–6	5–4	2–5	2–4	21–27	13–19	163–191	46%
Win (%)	100%	0%	0%	67%	42%	47%	51%	60%	45%	38%	20%	40%	56%	29%	33%	44%	41%	46%	
Year-end ranking	1008	343	221	189	109	82	77	30	47	93	119	158	186	154	83	65	90	$6,875,767	

== ATP Tour finals ==
=== Singles: 5 (3 titles, 2 runner-ups) ===
Legend Grand Slam (–) ATP 1000 (–) ATP 500 (–) ATP 250 (3–2)	Finals by surface Hard (2–1) Clay (0–1) Grass (1–0)	Finals by setting Outdoor (1–2) Indoor (2–0)

Result	W–L	Date	Tournament	Tier	Surface	Opponent	Score
Loss	0–1	Aug 2017	Winston-Salem Open, US	ATP 250	Hard	(Spain) Roberto Bautista Agut	4–6, 4–6
Win	1–1	Sep 2017	St. Petersburg Open, Russia	ATP 250	Hard (i)	(Italy) Fabio Fognini	3–6, 6–4, 6–2
Win	2–1	Oct 2017	Kremlin Cup, Russia	ATP 250	Hard (i)	(Lithuania) Ričardas Berankis	6–2, 1–6, 6–4
Win	3–1	Jun 2018	Antalya Open, Turkey	ATP 250	Grass	(France) Adrian Mannarino	6–1, 1–6, 6–1
Loss	3–2	Jul 2026	Croatia Open, Croatia	ATP 250	Clay	(Spain) Daniel Mérida	2–6, 7–5, 2–6

=== Doubles: 1 (runner-up) ===
Legend Grand Slam (–) ATP 1000 (–) ATP 500 (–) ATP 250 (0–1)	Finals by surface Hard (0–1) Clay (–) Grass (–)	Finals by setting Outdoor (–) Indoor (0–1)

Result	W–L	Date	Tournament	Tier	Surface	Partner	Opponents	Score
Loss	0–1	Oct 2017	Kremlin Cup, Russia	ATP 250	Hard (i)	(Croatia) Antonio Šančić	(Belarus) Max Mirnyi (Austria) Philipp Oswald	3–6, 5–7

== ATP Challenger and ITF Tour finals ==
=== Singles: 41 (27 titles, 14 runners-up) ===
Legend ATP Challenger (14–11) ITF Futures (13–3)	Finals by surface Hard (6–3) Clay (21–11)

Result	W–L	Date	Tournament	Tier	Surface	Opponent	Score
Win	1–0	May 2011	Bosnia and Herzegovina F3, Brčko	Futures	Clay	(Bosnia and Herzegovina) Aldin Šetkić	6–3, 5–7, 7–5
Loss	1–1	Jun 2011	Serbia F2, Belgrade	Futures	Clay	(France) Axel Michon	6–7^{(8–10)}, 6–4, 5–7
Win	2–1	Sep 2011	Croatia F8, Osijek	Futures	Clay	(Croatia) Mislav Hižak	6–1, 6–4
Win	3–1	Oct 2011	Croatia F14, Dubrovnik	Futures	Clay	(Czech Republic) Marek Michalička	6–4, 7–6^{(7–4)}
Win	4–1	Nov 2011	Turkey F32, Antalya	Futures	Clay	(Serbia) Ivan Bjelica	6–1, 6–1
Win	5–1	Feb 2012	Turkey F4, Antalya	Futures	Hard	(Austria) Nikolaus Moser	6–4, 7–6^{(7–4)}
Win	6–1	Apr 2012	Italy F2, Cividino	Futures	Hard (i)	(France) Charles-Antoine Brézac	6–4, 6–4
Win	7–1	May 2012	Bosnia and Herzegovina F1, Doboj	Futures	Clay	(France) Florian Reynet	6–0, 4–6, 6–0
Win	8–1	May 2012	Bosnia and Herzegovina F3, Brčko	Futures	Clay	(Croatia) Toni Androić	7–6^{(7–2)}, 6–2
Win	9–1	May 2012	Bosnia and Herzegovina F5, Kiseljak	Futures	Clay	(Slovakia) Norbert Gombos	6–3, 7–6^{(7–3)}
Win	10–1	Feb 2013	Croatia F1, Zagreb	Futures	Hard (i)	(Italy) Marco Cecchinato	6–2, 7–5
Win	11–1	May 2013	Bulgaria F1, Plovdiv	Futures	Clay	(Serbia) Miljan Zekić	6–3, 6–3
Loss	11–2	Jun 2013	Košice, Slovakia	Challenger	Clay	(Kazakhstan) Mikhail Kukushkin	4–6, 6–1, 2–6
Loss	11–3	Jun 2013	Bosnia and Herzegovina F4, Kiseljak	Futures	Clay	(Croatia) Mate Delić	5–7, 2–6
Loss	11–4	Jun 2013	Serbia F3, Šabac	Futures	Clay	(Hungary) Attila Balázs	4–6, 2–6
Loss	11–5	Jul 2013	Poznań, Poland	Challenger	Clay	(Austria) Andreas Haider-Maurer	6–4, 1–6, 5–7
Win	12–5	Oct 2013	Croatia F12, Dubrovnik	Futures	Clay	(Romania) Victor Crivoi	6–2, 4–6, 6–4
Win	13–5	Apr 2014	Mersin, Turkey	Challenger	Clay	(Spain) Pere Riba	7–6^{(7–4)}, 6–3
Win	14–5	Jun 2014	Arad, Romania	Challenger	Clay	(Spain) Pere Riba	6–4, 7–6^{(7–3)}
Win	15–5	Jul 2014	San Benedetto del Tronto, Italy	Challenger	Clay	(Austria) Andreas Haider-Maurer	6–3, 6–3
Win	16–5	Feb 2015	Santo Domingo, Dominican Republic	Challenger	Clay (green)	(Argentina) Renzo Olivo	7–5, 3–1, ret.
Loss	16–6	Feb 2015	Cuernavaca, Mexico	Challenger	Hard	(Dominican Republic) Víctor Estrella Burgos	5–7, 4–6
Win	17–6	Sep 2015	Alphen aan den Rijn, Netherlands	Challenger	Clay	(Netherlands) Igor Sijsling	6–1, 2–6, 6–1
Win	18–6	Oct 2015	Casablanca, Morocco	Challenger	Clay	(Spain) Daniel Muñoz de la Nava	3–6, 6–3, 6–2
Win	19–6	Jun 2017	Blois, France	Challenger	Clay	(France) Calvin Hemery	6–1, 6–3
Loss	19–7	Aug 2017	Santo Domingo, Dominican Republic	Challenger	Clay (green)	(Dominican Republic) Víctor Estrella Burgos	6–7^{(4–7)}, 4–6
Loss	19–8	Nov 2019	Bratislava, Slovakia	Challenger	Hard (i)	(Austria) Dennis Novak	1–6, 1–6
Loss	19–9	Oct 2020	Barcelona, Spain	Challenger	Clay	(Spain) Carlos Alcaraz	6–4, 2–6, 1–6
Loss	19–10	Apr 2021	Belgrade, Serbia	Challenger	Clay	(Spain) Roberto Carballés Baena	4–6, 5–7
Loss	19–11	Aug 2022	Banja Luka, Bosnia and Herzegovina	Challenger	Clay	(Hungary) Fábián Marozsán	2–6, 1–6
Loss	19–12	Sep 2022	Sibiu, Romania	Challenger	Clay	(Bosnia and Herzegovina) Nerman Fatić	3–6, 4–6
Win	20–12	Sep 2023	Istanbul, Turkey	Challenger	Hard	(Slovakia) Lukáš Klein	7–6^{(7–5)}, 6–3
Loss	20–13	Sep 2023	Sibiu, Romania	Challenger	Clay	(Bosnia and Herzegovina) Nerman Fatić	2–6, 4–6
Win	21–13	Apr 2024	Barletta, Italy	Challenger	Clay	(France) Harold Mayot	6–1, 6–3
Win	22–13	Apr 2024	Ostrava, Czech Republic	Challenger	Clay	(Germany) Henri Squire	6–2, 4–6, 7–5
Win	23–13	Jun 2024	Zagreb Open, Croatia	Challenger	Clay	(Croatia) Luka Mikrut	7–5, 6–0
Win	24–13	Aug 2024	Santo Domingo, Dominican Republic	Challenger	Clay (green)	(Ecuador) Andrés Andrade	6–4, 6–4
Win	25–13	Sep 2024	Istanbul, Turkey	Challenger	Hard (i)	(Serbia) Hamad Medjedovic	6–4, 6–2
Win	26–13	Nov 2024	Maia, Portugal	Challenger	Clay	(Italy) Francesco Passaro	6–3, 6–4
Loss	26–14	Mar 2025	Punta Cana, Dominican Republic	Challenger	Hard	(United States) Aleksandar Kovacevic	2–6, 3–6
Win	27–14	Oct 2026	Olbia, Italy	Challenger	Hard	(United Kingdom) Jacob Fearnley	7–6^{(7–4)}, 6–3

=== Doubles: 14 (8 titles, 6 runners-up) ===
Legend ATP Challenger (0–1) ITF Futures (8–5)	Finals by surface Hard (3–2) Clay (5–4)

Result	W–L	Date	Tournament	Tier	Surface	Partner	Opponents	Score
Win	1–0	Oct 2010	Croatia F8, Dubrovnik	Futures	Clay	(Bosnia and Herzegovina) Tomislav Brkić	(Croatia) Kristijan Mesaroš (Croatia) Marin Milan	2–6, 6–1, [11–9]
Win	2–0	Jan 2011	Israel F2, Eilat	Futures	Hard	(Bosnia and Herzegovina) Ismar Gorčić	(Canada) Steven Diez (Serbia) Nikola Ćaćić	6–3, 6–4
Loss	2–1	Jun 2011	Bosnia & Herzegovina F5, Kiseljak	Futures	Clay	(Bosnia and Herzegovina) Ismar Gorčić	(Croatia) Toni Androić (Serbia) Nikola Ćaćić	5–7, 4–6
Win	3–1	Jun 2011	Serbia F2, Belgrade	Futures	Clay	(Bosnia and Herzegovina) Aldin Šetkić	(Montenegro) Goran Tošić (Serbia) Nikola Ćaćić	2–6, 7–6^{(7–4)}, [10–6]
Loss	3–2	Aug 2011	Serbia F7, Novi Sad	Futures	Clay	(Serbia) Nikola Ćaćić	(Serbia) David Savić (Serbia) Ivan Bjelica	7–5, 1–6, [5–10]
Win	4–2	Sep 2011	Croatia F8, Osijek	Futures	Clay	(Croatia) Mate Pavić	(Croatia) Dino Marcan (Croatia) Marin Draganja	6–4, 3–6, [10–5]
Win	5–2	Nov 2011	Turkey F32, Antalya	Futures	Hard	(Bosnia and Herzegovina) Aldin Šetkić	(Bosnia and Herzegovina) Tomislav Brkić (Serbia) Ivan Bjelica	6–4, 6–3
Loss	5–3	Dec 2011	Turkey F33, Antalya	Futures	Hard	(Bosnia and Herzegovina) Aldin Šetkić	(Belgium) Joris De Loore (United Kingdom) Oliver Golding	3–6, 6–7^{(5–7)}
Win	6–3	Feb 2012	Turkey F4, Antalya	Futures	Hard	(Bosnia and Herzegovina) Aldin Šetkić	(Kuwait) Abdullah Maqdes (South Africa) Ruan Roelofse	6–4, 4–6, [10–5]
Loss	6–4	Mar 2012	Italy F1, Trento	Futures	Hard	(Serbia) Nikola Ćaćić	(Italy) Claudio Grassi (Italy) Marco Crugnola	4–6, 4–6
Loss	6–5	May 2012	Bosnia & Herzegovina F2, Sarajevo	Futures	Clay	(Slovenia) Andraž Bedene	(Austria) Lukas Weinhandl (Slovenia) Tomislav Ternar	3–6, 6–7^{(4–7)}
Win	7–5	Apr 2013	Italy F5, Vicenza	Futures	Clay	(Serbia) Nikola Ćaćić	(Italy) Alessandro Motti (Italy) Matteo Volante	6–3, 6–4
Win	8–5	May 2013	Bulgaria F1, Plovdiv	Futures	Clay	(Serbia) Miljan Zekić	(Bulgaria) Dinko Halachev (Bulgaria) Petar Trendafilov	7–5, 6–7^{(4–7)}, [12–10]
Loss	8–6	Jul 2015	Braunschweig, Germany	Challenger	Clay	(Croatia) Franko Škugor	(Belarus) Sergey Betov (Russia) Mikhail Elgin	6–3, 1–6, [5–10]

== Exhibition matches ==
=== Singles ===
Result	Date	Tournament	Surface	Opponent	Score
Loss	Jun 2015	Liverpool International, UK	Grass	(Spain) Pablo Andújar	5–8
Win	Jun 2016	Liverpool International, UK	Grass	(Italy) Paolo Lorenzi	7–5, 4–6, [10–3]

== National and international representation ==
=== Davis Cup: 27 (16 victories, 11 defeats) ===
Group membership World Group (0–0) Qualifying Round (0–1) Group I (3–2) Group II (12–8) Group III (0–0) Group IV (0–0)	Matches by surface Hard (8–7) Clay (6–3) Grass (0–0) Carpet (1–1)	Matches by Location Outdoor (6–3) Indoor (9–8)	Matches by Type Singles (14–10) Doubles (1–1)

- ▲ ▼ indicates the outcome of the Davis Cup match followed by the score, date, place of event, the zonal classification and its phase, and the court surface.

Rubber outcome	No.	Rubber	Match type (partner if any)	Opponent nation	Opponent player(s)	Score
▲3–2; July 9–11, 2010; Tere Tennisekeskus, Tallinn, Estonia; Europe/Africa second round; clay
Victory	1.	V	Singles	Estonia	Vladimir Ivanov	2–6, 6–0, 6–2, 6–3
▼2–3; September 17–19, 2010; Centro de Ténis Do Jamor, Cruz Quebrada, Portugal; Europe/Africa third round; clay
Victory	2.	V (dead rubber)	Singles	Portugal	João Sousa	4–6, 6–4, 6–1
▼2–3; September 16–18, 2011; Hillerød Tennisklub, Hillerød, Denmark; Europe/Africa third round; hard (indoor)
Defeat	3.	V	Singles	Denmark	Martin Pedersen	6–3, 1–6, 4–6, 1–6
▼1–4; April 6 – 8, 2012; Republic Olympic Training Centre for Tennis, Minsk, Belarus; Europe/Africa second round; hard (indoor)
Defeat	4.	II	Singles	Belarus	Uladzimir Ignatik	3–6, 6–7^{(4–7)}, 3–6
Defeat	5.	V (dead rubber)	Singles	Belarus	Dzmitry Zhyrmont	1–6, 5–7
▲4–1; February 1 – 3, 2013; Mojmilo Sports Hall, Sarajevo, Bosnia and Herzegovina; Europe/Africa first round; hard (indoor)
Victory	6.	I	Singles	Luxembourg	Mike Scheidweiler	6–4, 6–4, 6–0
Victory	7.	III	Doubles (with Tomislav Brkić)	Luxembourg	Mike Scheidweiler / Laurent Bram	6–1, 6–3, 6–3
▼1–3; April 5 – 7, 2013; Teniski Klub Mostar, Mostar, Bosnia and Herzegovina; Europe/Africa second round; clay
Victory	8.	II	Singles	Moldova	Maxim Dubarenco	6–3, 2–6, 5–7, 6–3, 6–4
Defeat	9.	III	Doubles (with Ismar Gorčić)	Moldova	Radu Albot / Andrei Ciumac	5–7, 4–6, 3–6
Defeat	10.	IV	Singles	Moldova	Radu Albot	7–6^{(7–4)}, 6–4, 4–6, 3–6, 3–6
▲3–1; January 31 – February 2, 2014; Mojmilo Sports Hall, Sarajevo, Bosnia and Herzegovina; Europe/Africa first round; carpet (indoor)
Defeat	11.	II	Singles	Greece	Markos Kalovelonis	6–7^{(4–7)}, 6–7^{(1–7)}, 6–3, 2–6
Victory	12.	IV	Singles	Greece	Alexandros Jakupovic	4–6, 3–6, 6–2, 6–3, 6–4
▲3–2; April 4 – 6, 2014; Tali Tennis Center, Helsinki, Finland; Europe/Africa second round; hard (indoor)
Victory	13.	I	Singles	Finland	Juho Paukku	6–3, 7–6^{(7–4)}, 6–4
Defeat	14.	IV	Singles	Finland	Jarkko Nieminen	5–7, 6–7^{(1–7)}, 1–6
▼2–3; September 12–14, 2014; Mojmilo Sports Hall, Sarajevo, Bosnia and Herzegovina; Europe/Africa third round; hard (indoor)
Victory	15.	II	Singles	Lithuania	Laurynas Grigelis	6–7^{(5–7)}, 6–1, 6–1, 1–0, ret.
Defeat	16.	IV	Singles	Lithuania	Ričardas Berankis	4–6, 4–6, 4–6
▲4–1; March 6–8, 2015; Harare Sports Club, Harare, Zimbabwe; Europe/Africa first round; hard
Victory	17.	II	Singles	Zimbabwe	Benjamin Lock	6–3, 7–6^{(7–1)}, 6–3
▲3–1; July 15–17, 2016; Javna ustanova za sport, odmor i rekreaciju, Bihać, Bosnia and Herzegovina; Europe/Africa second round; clay
Victory	18.	I	Singles	Turkey	Cem İlkel	7–5, 6–1, 4–6, 6–1
Victory	19.	IV	Singles	Turkey	Marsel İlhan	6–3, 6–0, 7–6^{(7–5)}
▲5–0; September 16–18, 2016; Siemens Arena, Vilnius, Lithuania; Europe/Africa third round; hard (indoor)
Victory	20.	I	Singles	Lithuania	Lukas Mugevičius	6–2, 6–2, 6–3
▲5–0; February 3 – 5, 2017; Arena Zenica, Zenica, Bosnia and Herzegovina; Europe/Africa first round; hard (indoor)
Victory	21.	II	Singles	Poland	Hubert Hurkacz	7–6^{(7–1)}, 7–5, 7–5
Victory	– (Note: Kamil Majchrzak was not able to compete in that rubber through the injury, thus it is not counted as match played and won by Džumhur)	IV	Singles	Poland	Kamil Majchrzak	Walkover
▼1–3; April 7 – 9, 2017; Arena Zenica, Zenica, Bosnia and Herzegovina; Europe/Africa second round; hard (indoor)
Victory	22.	II	Singles	Netherlands	Thiemo de Bakker	6–2, 6–2, 6–2
Defeat	23.	IV	Singles	Netherlands	Robin Haase	5–7, 3–6, 7–6^{(7–4)}, 6–2, 4–6
▲3–2; April 6 – 7, 2018; Aegon Arena, Bratislava, Slovakia; Europe/Africa second round; clay (indoor)
Victory	24.	I	Singles	Slovakia	Norbert Gombos	6–4, 6–1
Defeat	25.	IV	Singles	Slovakia	Martin Kližan	3–6, 6–7^{(3–7)}
▼0–4; February 1 – 2, 2019; Memorial Drive Park, Adelaide, Australia; Davis Cup qualifying round; hard
Defeat	26.	I	Singles	Australia	John Millman	3–6, 2–6

== ITF Junior finals ==
=== Singles: 9 (7 titles, 2 runners-up) ===
Legend
Grand Slam (0–0)
Grade A (0–0)
Grade B (1–0)
Grade 1–5 (7–2)

Outcome	No.	Date	Tournament	Surface	Opponent	Score
Winner	1.	24 August 2008	Skopje, Macedonia	Clay	(Serbia) Dimitrije Tasić	6–3, 6–3
Runner-up	1.	12 October 2008	Losinj, Croatia	Clay	(Slovakia) Ivan Kosec	3–6, 6–4, 4–6
Winner	2.	30 May 2009	Casablanca, Morocco	Clay	(United States) Junior Alexander Ore	6–3, 2–6, 6–1
Winner	3.	12 September 2009	Pančevo, Serbia	Clay	(Hungary) Máté Zsiga	6–1, 3–6, 6–3
Runner-up	2.	27 September 2009	Umag, Croatia	Clay	(Russia) Victor Baluda	4–6, 6–2, 6–7^{(3–7)}
Winner	4.	5 April 2010	Florence, Italy	Clay	(Italy) Alessandro Colella	6–3, 6–4
Winner	5.	13 June 2010	Offenbach am Main, Germany	Clay	(Ecuador) Roberto Quiroz	6–4, 6–7^{(1–7)}, 6–4
Winner	6.	25 July 2010	Klosters, Switzerland	Clay	(Spain) Andrés Artuñedo	6–1, 6–3
Winner	7.	4 September 2010	Repentigny, Canada	Hard	(Czech Republic) Jiří Veselý	6–2, 6–2

=== Doubles: 9 (5 titles, 4 runners-up) ===
Legend
Grand Slam (0–0)
Grade A (0–0)
Grade B (0–0)
Grade 1–5 (5–4)

Outcome	No.	Date	Tournament	Surface	Partner	Opponents	Score
Runner-up	1.	27 April 2008	Mostar, Bosnia and Herzegovina	Clay	(Bosnia and Herzegovina) Derviš Sutković	(Bosnia and Herzegovina) Jasmin Ademović (Bosnia and Herzegovina) Sven Lalić	2–6, 1–6
Runner-up	2.	24 August 2008	Skopje, North Macedonia	Clay	(Italy) Kevin Albonetti	(Serbia) Dimitrije Tasić (Serbia) Stefan Milenković	6–1, 6–7^{(5–7)}, 2–6
Winner	1.	11 April 2009	Cap-d'Ail, France	Clay	(Russia) Aleksander Kondulukov	(France) Cedrick Commin (France) Gianni Mina	4–6, 6–4, [11–9]
Winner	2.	30 May 2009	Casablanca, Morocco	Clay	(United States) Junior Alexander Ore	(South Africa) Grant Ive (Tunisia) Slim Hamza	6–4, 6–2
Winner	3.	12 September 2009	Pančevo, Serbia	Clay	(Hungary) Máté Zsiga	(Latvia) Arturs Kazijevs (Latvia) Miķelis Lībietis	6–4, 6–3
Winner	4.	27 September 2009	Umag, Croatia	Clay	(Hungary) Máté Zsiga	(Croatia) Ivan Turudić (Croatia) Toni Androić	2–6, 6–4, [10–7]
Runner-up	3.	5 April 2010	Florence, Italy	Clay	(Germany) Peter Heller	(Croatia) Mate Pavić (Czech Republic) Robert Rumler	6–1, 2–6, [9–11]
Runner-up	4.	29 May 2010	Charleroi, Belgium	Clay	(Hungary) Máté Zsiga	(Belgium) Joris De Loore (Sweden) Tobias Blomgren	2–6, 5–7
Winner	5.	4 September 2010	Repentigny, Canada	Hard	(Croatia) Mate Pavić	(Ecuador) Roberto Quiroz (Peru) Duilio Beretta	6–1, 6–4

=== Other junior finals ===
==== Singles: 7 (3 titles, 4 runners-up) ====
Tournaments organized by Tennis Europe in the category "14 & Under"

Outcome	No.	Date	Tournament	Surface	Opponent	Score
Runner-up	1.	9 April 2006	Pavia, Italy	Clay	(Russia) Ashot Khacharyan	0–6, 3–6
Winner	1.	18 June 2006	Mostar, Bosnia and Herzegovina	Clay	(Croatia) Antun Pehar	6–4, 3–6, 7–5
Winner	2.	13 August 2006	Ulm, Germany	Clay	(Czech Republic) Jan Zedník	4–6, 3–0, ret.
Runner-up	2.	27 August 2006	Renningen, Germany	Clay	(Russia) Alexander Rumyantsev	0–6, 1–6

Tournaments organized by Tennis Europe in the category "16 & Under"

Outcome	No.	Date	Tournament	Surface	Opponent	Score
Winner	3.	26 August 2007	Renningen, Germany	Clay	(Germany) Dominik Schulz	6–4, 6–3
Runner-up	3.	2 September 2007	Regensburg, Germany	Clay	(Croatia) Vedran Ljubičić	6–3, 5–7, 6–7
Runner-up	4.	20 April 2008	Novi Sad, Serbia	Clay	(Hungary) Máté Zsiga	3–6, 1–6

== Best Grand Slam results details ==
	Australian Open	
2014 Australian Open (qualifier)
Round	Opponent	Score
Q1	(Germany) Dustin Brown (1)	6–4, 6–2
Q2	(Belgium) Niels Desein	7–6^{(7–3)}, 6–1
Q3	(Belgium) Ruben Bemelmans (25)	7–6^{(7–1)}, 6–3
1R	(Czech Republic) Jan Hájek	6–4, 6–2, 6–1
2R	(Croatia) Ivan Dodig (32)	4–6, 4–6, 6–3, 4–1 ret.
3R	(Czech Republic) Tomáš Berdych (7)	4–6, 2–6, 2–6
2018 Australian Open (28th Seed)
Round	Opponent	Score
1R	(Italy) Paolo Lorenzi	3–6, 2–6, 7–6^{(7–5)}, 6–2, 6–4
2R	(Australia) John Millman (PR)	7–5, 3–6, 6–4, 6–1
3R	(Spain) Rafael Nadal (1)	1–6, 3–6, 1–6

	French Open	
2015 French Open
Round	Opponent	Score
1R	(Russia) Mikhail Youzhny	6–2, 6–1, 0–0 ret.
2R	(Cyprus) Marcos Baghdatis	6–4, 6–3, 4–6, 6–2
3R	(Switzerland) Roger Federer (2)	4–6, 3–6, 2–6
2018 French Open (26th Seed)
Round	Opponent	Score
1R	(United States) Denis Kudla (Q)	6–4, 6–2, 6–2
2R	(Moldova) Radu Albot	6–3, 6–3, 5–7, 1–6, 7–5
3R	(Germany) Alexander Zverev (2)	2–6, 6–3, 6–4, 6–7^{(3–7)}, 5–7

	Wimbledon Championships	
2016 Wimbledon
Round	Opponent	Score
1R	(United States) Denis Kudla	7–6^{(7–5)}, 7–5, 2–6, 1–6, 6–3
2R	(France) Pierre-Hugues Herbert	6–3, 6–7^{(1–7)}, 6–7^{(0–7)}, 2–6
2017 Wimbledon
Round	Opponent	Score
1R	(Argentina) Renzo Olivo	6–2, 6–0, 6–1
2R	(United Kingdom) Aljaž Bedene	3–6, 6–3, 3–6, 3–6
2018 Wimbledon (27th Seed)
Round	Opponent	Score
1R	(Germany) Maximilian Marterer	6–3, 6–2, 6–4
2R	(Latvia) Ernests Gulbis (Q)	6–2, 4–6, 3–6, 6–1, 3–6

	US Open	
2017 US Open
Round	Opponent	Score
1R	(Uruguay) Pablo Cuevas (27)	7–5, 7–6^{(7–3)}, 6–1
2R	(Germany) Cedrik-Marcel Stebe (Q)	4–6, 6–4, 6–0, 6–1
3R	(Russia) Andrey Rublev	4–6, 4–6, 7–5, 4–6

== Wins against Top 10 players ==
- Džumhur has a 4–21 (16%) record against players who were, at the time the match was played, ranked in the top 10.

Season	2016	2017	Total
Wins	2	2	4

#	Player	Rank	Event	Surface	Rd	Score	DDR
2016
1.	(Spain) Rafael Nadal	5	Miami, United States	Hard	2R	2–6, 6–4, 3–0, ret.	94
2.	(Czech Republic) Tomáš Berdych	7	Monte Carlo, Monaco	Clay	2R	6–4, 6–7^{(1–7)}, 6–3	99
2017
3.	(Switzerland) Stan Wawrinka	3	Dubai, United Arab Emirates	Hard	1R	7–6^{(7–4)}, 6–3	77
4.	(Germany) Alexander Zverev	4	Shenzhen, China	Hard	QF	6–4, 7–5	40
