= 2009 ITF Men's Circuit =

Tennis tournament series

Details

Achievements (singles)

The 2009 ITF Men's Circuit was the 2009 edition of the third-tier tour for men's professional tennis. It was organised by the International Tennis Federation and is a tier below the ATP Challenger Tour. The ITF Men's Circuit consisted of 493 'Futures' tournaments played year round across six continents, with prize money ranging from $10,000 to $15,000.

== Futures events ==
$15,000 tournaments
$10,000 tournaments

=== January ===
Tournament	Date	City	Surface	Singles champions	Doubles champions
Brazil F35 Futures $15,000	December 29	São Paulo; Brazil	Hard		
China F1 Futures $15,000	January 5	Guangzhou; China P.R.	Hard	(Chinese Taipei) Yang Tsung-hua	(Chinese Taipei) Lee Hsin-han (Chinese Taipei) Yang Tsung-hua
Germany F1 Futures $10,000	January 5	Schwieberdingen; Germany	Carpet (i)	(Latvia) Andis Juška	(Latvia) Andis Juška (Czech Republic) Lukáš Rosol
China F2 Futures $15,000	January 12	Shenzhen; China P.R.	Hard	(China) Zeng Shaoxuan	(United States) Rylan Rizza (United States) Kaes Van't Hof
USA F1 Futures $10,000	January 12	Boca Raton, Florida; USA	Clay	(Venezuela) José de Armas	(Belarus) Uladzimir Ignatik (Armenia) Tigran Martirosyan
Great Britain F1 Futures $15,000	January 12	Glasgow; Great Britain	Hard (i)	(France) Stéphane Robert	(United Kingdom) Jamie Baker (United Kingdom) Chris Eaton
Germany F2 Futures $10,000	January 12	Stuttgart; Germany	Hard (i)	(Czech Republic) Jan Mertl	(Germany) Bastian Knittel (Russia) Konstantin Kravchuk
Spain F1 Futures $10,000	January 12	Ciutadella; Spain	Clay	(Spain) Íñigo Cervantes	(Spain) Íñigo Cervantes (Spain) Gerard Granollers
USA F2 Futures $10,000	January 19	Hollywood, Florida; USA	Clay	(Serbia) Nikola Ćirić	(Bulgaria) Grigor Dimitrov (Bulgaria) Todor Enev
Great Britain F2 Futures $15,000	January 19	Sheffield; Great Britain	Hard (i)	(Slovakia) Lukáš Lacko	(United Kingdom) Richard Bloomfield (United Kingdom) Jonathan Marray
Austria F1 Futures $10,000	January 19	Bergheim; Austria	Carpet (i)	(Austria) Nicolas Reissig	(United Kingdom) Aljaž Bedene (Slovakia) Andrej Martin
Israel F1 Futures $10,000	January 19	Eilat; Israel	Hard	(Hungary) Attila Balázs	(Hungary) Attila Balázs (Israel) Amir Hadad
El Salvador F1 Futures $10,000	January 19	Santa Tecla, El Salvador; El Salvador	Clay	(Germany) Lars Pörschke	(Italy) Claudio Grassi (Argentina) Gaston-Arturo Grimolizzi
Spain F2 Futures $10,000	January 19	Magaluf; Spain	Clay	(Spain) Andoni Vivanco-Guzmán	(Germany) Dustin Brown (Germany) Peter Steinberger
Germany F3 Futures $10,000	January 19	Kaarst; Germany	Carpet (i)	(Germany) Bastian Knittel	(Germany) Bastian Knittel (Serbia) Darko Mađarovski
USA F3 Futures $10,000	January 26	Plantation, Florida; USA	Clay	(United States) Jesse Witten	(Armenia) Tigran Martirosyan (United States) Jesse Witten
Austria F2 Futures $10,000	January 26	Bergheim; Austria	Carpet (i)	(Slovakia) Miloslav Mečíř	(United States) Nicholas Edlefsen (Austria) Christoph Palmanshofer
Israel F2 Futures $10,000	January 26	Eilat; Israel	Hard	(Israel) Noam Okun	(Israel) Harel Levy (Israel) Noam Okun
France F1 Futures $10,000	January 26	Bagnoles-de-l'Orne; France	Clay (i)	(France) Julien Jeanpierre	(Netherlands) Romano Frantzen (France) Alexandre Renard
Guatemala F1 Futures $10,000	January 26	Guatemala; Guatemala	Hard	(Argentina) Federico Delbonis	(Germany) Holger Fischer (Germany) Lars Pörschke
Spain F3 Futures $10,000	January 26	Murcia; Spain	Clay	(Spain) Javier Genaro-Martinez	(Germany) Dustin Brown (Germany) Daniel Stoehr
Germany F4 Futures $15,000	January 26	Mettmann; Germany	Carpet (i)	(Czech Republic) Lukáš Rosol	(United Kingdom) Josh Goodall (United Kingdom) James Ward
Egypt F1 Futures $10,000	January 26	Giza; Egypt	Clay	(Czech Republic) Dušan Lojda	(Italy) Daniele Giorgini (Italy) Simone Vagnozzi
Mexico F1 Futures $15,000	January 26	Tuxtla Gutiérrez, Chiapas; Mexico	Hard	(United States) Nicholas Monroe	(Italy) Claudio Grassi (United States) Matthew Roberts
Morocco F1 Futures $15,000	January 26	Casablanca; Morocco	Clay	(Algeria) Lamine Ouahab	(Morocco) Mohamed Saber (Morocco) Mehdi Ziadi

=== February ===
Tournament	Date	City	Surface	Singles champions	Doubles champions
Austria F3 Futures $10,000	February 2	Bergheim; Austria	Carpet (i)	(Austria) Johannes Ager	(Czech Republic) Jiří Krkoška (Republic of Ireland) James McGee
Israel F3 Futures $10,000	February 2	Eilat; Israel	Hard	(Israel) Harel Levy	(Israel) Idan Mark (Israel) Saar Steele
France F2 Futures $10,000	February 2	Feucherolles; France	Hard (i)	(Switzerland) Michael Lammer	(France) Olivier Charroin (France) Nicolas Tourte
Costa Rica F1 Futures $10,000	February 2	San Jose; Costa Rica	Hard	(Peru) Mauricio Echazú	(United States) Rylan Rizza (United States) Kaes Van't Hof
Spain F4 Futures $10,000	February 2	Murcia; Spain	Clay	(Spain) Pere Riba	(Germany) Dustin Brown (Germany) Peter Steinberger
Egypt F2 Futures $10,000	February 2	Cairo; Egypt	Clay	(Italy) Simone Vagnozzi	(Egypt) Karim Maamoun (Egypt) Sherif Sabry
Colombia F1 Futures $15,000	February 2	Manizales; Colombia	Clay	(Chile) Guillermo Hormazábal	(Colombia) Alejandro González (Colombia) Eduardo Struvay
Mexico F2 Futures $15,000	February 2	Naucalpan; Mexico	Hard	(Mexico) Víctor Romero	(Mexico) Luis Díaz Barriga (Mexico) Antonio Ruiz-Rosales
Germany F5 Futures $15,000	February 2	Nussloch; Germany	Carpet (i)	(Germany) Julian Reister	(Romania) Marius Copil (Romania) Petru-Alexandru Luncanu
Morocco F2 Futures $15,000	February 2	Rabat; Morocco	Clay	(Algeria) Lamine Ouahab	(Tunisia) Malek Jaziri (Algeria) Lamine Ouahab
Ivory Coast F1 Futures $15,000	February 2	Abidjan; Côte d'Ivoire	Hard	(Italy) Paolo Lorenzi	(Canada) Pierre-Ludovic Duclos (Austria) Andreas Haider-Maurer
Panama F1 Futures $10,000	February 9	Panama; Panama	Clay	(El Salvador) Rafael Arévalo	(United States) Rylan Rizza (United States) Kaes Van't Hof
France F3 Futures $10,000	February 9	Bressuire; France	Hard (i)	(Belgium) Ruben Bemelmans	(France) Olivier Charroin (France) Nicolas Tourte
Ivory Coast F2 Futures $15,000	February 9	Abidjan; Côte d'Ivoire	Hard	(Austria) Andreas Haider-Maurer	(United Kingdom) Colin Fleming (United Kingdom) Ken Skupski
Australia F1 Futures $15,000	February 9	Mildura, Victoria; Australia	Grass	(United Kingdom) Brydan Klein	(Australia) Matthew Ebden (United Kingdom) Brydan Klein
Spain F5 Futures $10,000	February 9	Cartagena; Spain	Clay	(Italy) Andrea Arnaboldi	(Sweden) Daniel Danilović (Montenegro) Goran Tošić
Croatia F1 Futures $15,000	February 9	Zagreb; Croatia	Hard (i)	(Austria) Martin Fischer	(Croatia) Ivan Cerović (Croatia) Joško Topić
Egypt F3 Futures $10,000	February 9	Cairo; Egypt	Clay	(France) Guillaume Rufin	(Egypt) Karim Maamoun (Egypt) Sherif Sabry
Italy F1 Futures $15,000	February 9	Bari; Italy	Clay (i)	(Italy) Walter Trusendi	(Latvia) Deniss Pavlovs (Italy) Walter Trusendi
Colombia F2 Futures $15,000	February 9	Cartagena; Colombia	Hard	(Colombia) Carlos Salamanca	(Colombia) Juan Sebastián Cabal (Colombia) Carlos Salamanca
USA F4 Futures $15,000	February 16	Brownsville, Texas; USA	Hard	(United States) Michael Russell	(United States) Lester Cook (United States) Shane La Porte
Australia F2 Futures $15,000	February 16	Berri, South Australia; Australia	Grass	(Australia) Marinko Matosevic	(China) Zeng Shaoxuan (China) Zhang Ze
Spain F6 Futures $10,000	February 16	Cartagena; Spain	Hard	(France) Alexandre Renard	(Sweden) Daniel Danilović (Montenegro) Goran Tošić
Croatia F2 Futures $15,000	February 16	Zagreb; Croatia	Hard (i)	(Slovakia) Lukáš Lacko	(Romania) Victor Ioniță (Russia) Denis Matsukevich
Italy F2 Futures $15,000	February 16	Trento; Italy	Hard (i)	(France) Stéphane Robert	(Italy) Leonardo Azzaro (Sweden) Filip Prpic
USA F5 Futures $15,000	February 23	Harlingen, Texas; USA	Hard	(United States) Jesse Witten	(Mexico) Javier Herrera-Eguiluz (United States) Jarmere Jenkins
Spain F7 Futures $10,000	February 23	Terrassa; Spain	Clay	(Spain) Adrián Menéndez Maceiras	(Italy) Francesco Aldi (Italy) Alessandro Piccari

=== March ===
Tournament	Date	City	Surface	Singles champions	Doubles champions
USA F6 Futures $15,000	March 2	McAllen, Texas; USA	Hard	(United States) Lester Cook	(Philippines) Ruben Gonzales (Sweden) Andreas Siljeström
Portugal F1 Futures $10,000	March 2	Faro; Portugal	Hard	(Czech Republic) Dušan Lojda	(Spain) Agustin Boje-Ordonez (Spain) Ignacio Coll Riudavets
Switzerland F1 Futures $10,000	March 2	Greifensee; Switzerland	Carpet (i)	(Germany) Nils Langer	(Czech Republic) Roman Vögeli (Czech Republic) Michal Tabara
Spain F8 Futures $10,000	March 2	Sabadell; Spain	Clay	(Brazil) Daniel Dutra da Silva	(Spain) Sergio Gutiérrez Ferrol (Netherlands) Boy Westerhof
Kazakhstan F1 Futures $15,000	March 2	Astana; Kazakhstan	Hard (i)	(Kazakhstan) Alexey Kedryuk	(Slovakia) Martin Kližan (Slovakia) Marek Semjan
Canada F1 Futures $10,000	March 2	Gatineau; Canada	Hard (i)	(France) Vincent Millot	(Belgium) Frederic De Fays (Belgium) Germain Gigounon
New Zealand F1 Futures $15,000	March 9	North Shore; New Zealand	Hard	(Australia) Rameez Junaid	(New Zealand) G.D. Jones (New Zealand) Daniel King-Turner
Great Britain F3 Futures $15,000	March 9	Tipton; Great Britain	Hard (i)	(Belgium) Yannick Mertens	(United Kingdom) Dan Evans (Finland) Henri Kontinen
Portugal F2 Futures $10,000	March 9	Lagos; Portugal	Hard	(Slovakia) Kamil Čapkovič	(Brazil) Marcelo Demoliner (Brazil) Rodrigo Guidolin
Switzerland F2 Futures $10,000	March 9	Greifensee; Switzerland	Carpet (i)	(Estonia) Jürgen Zopp	(Switzerland) Henri Laaksonen (Austria) Philipp Oswald
France F4 Futures $15,000	March 9	Lille; France	Hard (i)	(France) David Guez	(Romania) Teodor-Dacian Crăciun (Romania) Victor Ioniță
Spain F9 Futures $10,000	March 9	Badalona; Spain	Clay	(Spain) Albert Ramos Viñolas	(Australia) John Millman (Australia) Mark Verryth
Kazakhstan F2 Futures $15,000	March 9	Almaty; Kazakhstan	Hard (i)	(Slovakia) Marek Semjan	(Russia) Ilya Belyaev (Russia) Andrei Plotniy
Canada F2 Futures $10,000	March 9	Montreal; Canada	Hard (i)	(Canada) Milos Raonic	(Australia) Adam Hubble (Australia) Kaden Hensel
Japan F1 Futures $10,000	March 16	Nishitama; Japan	Hard	(Chinese Taipei) Yi Chu-huan	(Japan) Hiroyasu Sato (Chinese Taipei) Yi Chu-huan
New Zealand F2 Futures $15,000	March 16	Hamilton; New Zealand	Hard	(Australia) Carsten Ball	(Australia) Miles Armstrong (Australia) Adam Feeney
Great Britain F4 Futures $15,000	March 16	Bath; Great Britain	Hard (i)	(France) Stéphane Robert	(United Kingdom) Colin Fleming (United Kingdom) Ken Skupski
Portugal F3 Futures $10,000	March 16	Albufeira; Portugal	Hard	(Portugal) Leonardo Tavares	(Serbia) Aleksander Slovic (Bosnia and Herzegovina) Aldin Šetkić
Switzerland F3 Futures $10,000	March 16	Vaduz; Liechtenstein	Carpet (i)	(Germany) Dustin Brown	(France) Jeremy Blandin (France) Pierrick Ysern
France F5 Futures $15,000	March 16	Poitiers; France	Hard (i)	(Australia) Robert Smeets	(Netherlands) Michel Koning (Australia) Robert Smeets
Spain F10 Futures $10,000	March 16	Castelldefels; Spain	Clay	(Spain) Roberto Bautista Agut	(Spain) Marc Fornell Mestres (Spain) Gerard Granollers
Turkey F1 Futures $10,000	March 16	Manavgat; Turkey	Clay	(Czech Republic) Adam Vejmelka	(Ukraine) Ivan Anikanov (Ukraine) Artem Smirnov
Italy F3 Futures $10,000	March 16	Roma Real; Italy	Clay	(Sweden) Tim Göransson	(Italy) Daniele Giorgini (Italy) Luca Vanni
India F1 Futures $15,000	March 16	Chandigarh; India	Hard	(South Korea) Lim Yong-kyu	(India) Divij Sharan (India) Vishnu Vardhan
Canada F3 Futures $10,000	March 16	Sherbrooke; Canada	Hard (i)	(Canada) Frédéric Niemeyer	(Canada) Daniel Chu (Canada) Adil Shamasdin
Japan F2 Futures $10,000	March 23	Nishitama; Japan	Hard	(Japan) Gouichi Motomura	(Japan) Satoshi Iwabuchi (Japan) Gouichi Motomura
New Zealand F3 Futures $15,000	March 23	Wellington; New Zealand	Hard	(New Zealand) Daniel King-Turner	(New Zealand) G.D. Jones (New Zealand) Daniel King-Turner
Spain F11 Futures $10,000	March 23	Zaragoza; Spain	Clay (i)	(Spain) Gabriel Trujillo Soler	(Spain) Ignacio Coll Riudavets (Spain) Gerard Granollers
Croatia F3 Futures $10,000	March 23	Poreč; Croatia	Clay	(Germany) Bastian Knittel	(Croatia) Marin Bradarić (Croatia) Ante Nakic-Alfirevic
Egypt F4 Futures $10,000	March 23	6th of October City; Egypt	Clay	(Morocco) Reda El Amrani	(Morocco) Mounir El Aarej (Morocco) Talal Ouahabi
Turkey F2 Futures $10,000	March 23	Manavgat; Turkey	Clay	(Ukraine) Ivan Sergeyev	(Ukraine) Gleb Alekseenko (Ukraine) Vadim Alekseenko
Italy F4 Futures $10,000	March 23	Eur; Italy	Clay	(France) Éric Prodon	(Italy) Leonardo Azzaro (Italy) Daniele Giorgini
India F2 Futures $15,000	March 23	Kolkata; India	Clay	(Hungary) Ádám Kellner	(Chinese Taipei) Chen I-ta (Chinese Taipei) Lee Hsin-han
Japan F3 Futures $10,000	March 30	Kofu; Japan	Hard	(South Korea) An Jae-sung	(Chinese Taipei) Yang Tsung-hua (Chinese Taipei) Yi Chu-huan
USA F7 Futures $15,000	March 30	Mobile, Alabama; USA	Hard	(Australia) Sam Groth	(Canada) Philip Bester (Canada) Milos Raonic
Croatia F4 Futures $10,000	March 30	Rovinj; Croatia	Clay	(Croatia) Antonio Veić	(Croatia) Marin Bradarić (Serbia) Aleksander Slovic
Egypt F5 Futures $10,000	March 30	Ain Sokhna; Egypt	Clay	(Egypt) Karim Maamoun	(Russia) Andrey Kuznetsov (Hungary) Róbert Varga
Turkey F3 Futures $10,000	March 30	Belek; Turkey	Clay	(Ukraine) Ivan Sergeyev	(Romania) Florin Mergea (Romania) Costin Pavăl
Italy F5 Futures $10,000	March 30	Viterbo; Italy	Clay	(Spain) Guillermo Olaso	(Italy) Thomas Fabbiano (Italy) Stefano Valenti

=== April ===
Tournament	Date	City	Surface	Singles champions	Doubles champions
Korea Rep. F1 Futures $15,000	April 6			(South Korea) Lim Yong-kyu	(New Zealand) G.D. Jones (New Zealand) Daniel King-Turner
Croatia F5 Futures $10,000	April 6			(Romania) Gabriel Moraru	(Austria) Werner Eschauer (Austria) Herbert Wiltschnig
Italy F6 Futures $10,000	April 6	Vercelli; Italy	Clay	(Italy) Matteo Marrai	(Switzerland) Mathieu Guenat (Argentina) Cristian Villagrán
Turkey F4 Futures $10,000	April 6	Belek; Turkey	Hard	(Turkey) Marsel İlhan	(Germany) Kevin Deden (Germany) Martin Emmrich
Egypt F6 Futures $10,000	April 6	Cairo; Egypt	Clay	(Morocco) Talal Ouahabi	(Romania) Teodor-Dacian Crăciun (Egypt) Karim Maamoun
USA F8 Futures $15,000	April 6	Little Rock, Arkansas; USA	Hard	(United States) Matt Bocko	(Australia) Adam Hubble (Australia) Kaden Hensel
Russia F1 Futures $15,000	April 6	Moscow; Russia	Carpet (i)	(Slovakia) Lukáš Lacko	(Russia) Konstantin Kravchuk (Slovakia) Lukáš Lacko
Russia F2 Futures $15,000	April 13	Tyumen; Russia	Carpet (i)	(Slovakia) Lukáš Lacko	(Kazakhstan) Alexey Kedryuk (Russia) Denis Matsukevich
Argentina F1 Futures $10,000	April 13	Jujuy; Argentina	Clay	(Argentina) Guido Pella	(Argentina) Juan-Pablo Amado (Argentina) Diego Cristin
Turkey F5 Futures $10,000	April 13	Belek; Turkey	Hard	(Turkey) Marsel İlhan	(Denmark) Martin Pedersen (Germany) Sebastian Rieschick
Korea Rep. F2 Futures $15,000	April 13	Seogwipo; Korea Rep.	Hard	(Japan) Tatsuma Ito	(Japan) Satoshi Iwabuchi (Japan) Gouichi Motomura
France F6 Futures $15,000	April 13	Angers; France	Clay (i)	(France) Guillaume Rufin	(France) Xavier Pujo (France) Alexandre Renard
Uzbekistan F1 Futures $15,000	April 13	Andijan; Uzbekistan	Hard	(Czech Republic) Jan Minář	(Belarus) Andrei Karatchenia (Belarus) Dzmitry Zhyrmont
Uzbekistan F2 Futures $15,000	April 20	Namangan; Uzbekistan	Hard	(Kazakhstan) Alexey Kedryuk	(Kazakhstan) Syrym Abdukhalikov (Kazakhstan) Alexey Kedryuk
India F3 Futures $15,000	April 20	New Delhi; India	Hard	(India) Yuki Bhambri	(India) Sriram Balaji (India) Ashutosh Singh
Spain F13 Futures $10,000	April 20	Reus; Spain	Clay	(Spain) Ignacio Coll Riudavets	(Spain) José Antonio Sánchez de Luna (Spain) Gabriel Trujillo Soler
France F7 Futures $15,000	April 20	Grasse; France	Clay	(France) Xavier Pujo	(France) Jean-Christophe Faurel (France) Julien Jeanpierre
Korea Rep. F3 Futures $15,000	April 20	Changwon; Korea Rep.	Hard	(Denmark) Frederik Nielsen	(China) Li Zhe (China) Wang Yu
Turkey F6 Futures $10,000	April 20	Belek; Turkey	Hard	(Monaco) Thomas Oger	(Germany) Martin Emmrich (Finland) Juho Paukku
Argentina F2 Futures $10,000	April 20	Villa del Dique; Argentina	Clay	(Brazil) Alexandre Bonatto	(Argentina) Juan-Pablo Amado (Argentina) Diego Cristin
Italy F7 Futures $15,000	April 20	Padova; Italy	Clay	(Argentina) Cristian Villagrán	(Romania) Victor Ioniță (Romania) Gabriel Moraru
Italy F8 Futures $15,000	April 27	Vicenza; Italy	Clay	(Italy) Francesco Aldi	(Argentina) Guillermo Carry (Slovenia) Andrej Kračman
Mexico F3 Futures $15,000	April 27	Córdoba; Mexico	Hard	(Mexico) Santiago González	(Mexico) Juan Manuel Elizondo (Mexico) César Ramírez
USA F9 Futures $10,000	April 27	Vero Beach, Florida; USA	Clay	(France) Jonathan Dasnières de Veigy	(Philippines) Treat Huey (United States) Greg Ouellette
Argentina F3 Futures $10,000	April 27	Arroyito; Argentina	Clay	(Argentina) Alejandro Kon	(Argentina) Andrés Molteni (Argentina) Guido Pella
Australia F3 Futures $15,000	April 27	Bundaberg; Australia	Clay	(New Zealand) Rubin Statham	(Australia) Miles Armstrong (Australia) Mark McCook
Korea Rep. F4 Futures $15,000	April 27	Gimcheon; Korea Rep.	Hard	(South Korea) Lim Yong-kyu	(New Zealand) G.D. Jones (New Zealand) Daniel King-Turner
Spain F14 Futures $10,000	April 27	Vic; Spain	Clay	(Spain) José Antonio Sánchez de Luna	(Spain) Gerard Granollers (Spain) José Antonio Sánchez de Luna
Great Britain F5 Futures $10,000	April 27	Bournemouth; Great Britain	Clay	(Spain) Andoni Vivanco-Guzmán	(Republic of Ireland) Colin O'Brien (United Kingdom) Daniel Smethurst
India F4 Futures $15,000	April 27	New Delhi; India	Hard	(India) Yuki Bhambri	(India) Divij Sharan (India) Vishnu Vardhan

=== May ===
Tournament	Date	City	Surface	Singles champions	Doubles champions
Great Britain F6 Futures $10,000	May 4	Edinburgh; Great Britain	Clay	(Spain) Guillermo Alcaide	(United Kingdom) Daniel Smethurst (United Kingdom) Marcus Willis
Romania F1 Futures $10,000	May 4	Craiova; Romania	Clay	(Ukraine) Artem Smirnov	(Romania) Marius Copil (Romania) Petru-Alexandru Luncanu
Spain F15 Futures $10,000	May 4	Balaguer; Spain	Clay	(Spain) Albert Ramos Viñolas	(Spain) Gerard Granollers (Spain) José Antonio Sánchez de Luna
China F3 Futures $15,000	May 4	Taizhou; China P.R.	Hard	(China) Gong Maoxin	(China) Lu Hao (China) Xu Junchao
Australia F4 Futures $15,000	May 4	Ipswich; Australia	Clay	(Australia) Greg Jones	(Australia) Miles Armstrong (Australia) Mark McCook
Bulgaria F1 Futures $10,000	May 4	Sandanski; Bulgaria	Clay	(Bulgaria) Ivaylo Traykov	(Denmark) Thomas Kromann (Australia) John Millman
Argentina F4 Futures $10,000	May 4	Villa del Dique; Argentina	Clay	(Argentina) Juan-Manuel Valverde	(Argentina) Facundo Argüello (Argentina) Agustin Picco
Brazil F1 Futures $10,000	May 4	Campinas; Brazil	Clay	(Brazil) Júlio Silva	(Brazil) André Miele (Brazil) Fernando Romboli
USA F10 Futures $10,000	May 4	Orange Park, Florida; USA	Clay	(Italy) Luigi D'Agord	(United States) Marcus Fugate (United States) Todd Paul
Bosnia & Herzegovina F1 Futures $10,000	May 4	Doboj; Bosnia and Herzegovina	Clay	(Croatia) Nikola Mektić	(Germany) Dennis Bloemke (Australia) Jarryd Maher
Czech Rep. F1 Futures $10,000	May 4	Teplice; Czech Republic	Clay	(Czech Republic) Michal Tabara	(Poland) Mateusz Kowalczyk (Russia) Andrey Kuznetsov
Mexico F4 Futures $10,000	May 4	Coatzacoalcos; Mexico	Hard	(Mexico) César Ramírez	(Canada) Vasek Pospisil (Canada) Adil Shamasdin
Italy F9 Futures $15,000	May 4	Aosta; Italy	Clay	(Spain) Gabriel Trujillo Soler	(Chile) Guillermo Hormazábal (Argentina) Leandro Migani
Italy F10 Futures $15,000	May 11	Pozzuoli; Italy	Clay	(Belgium) Yannick Mertens	(Argentina) Juan-Martín Aranguren (Argentina) Alejandro Fabbri
Mexico F5 Futures $10,000	May 11	Puerto Vallarta, Jalisco; Mexico	Hard	(Italy) Luigi D'Agord	(Canada) Vasek Pospisil (Canada) Adil Shamasdin
Bosnia & Herzegovina F2 Futures $10,000	May 11	Sarajevo; Bosnia and Herzegovina	Clay	(Bosnia and Herzegovina) Aldin Šetkić	(Serbia) Aleksander Slovic (Bosnia and Herzegovina) Aldin Šetkić
Czech Rep. F2 Futures $10,000	May 11	Most; Czech Republic	Clay	(Poland) Jerzy Janowicz	(Czech Republic) Roman Vögeli (Czech Republic) Michal Tabara
Venezuela F1 Futures $10,000	May 11	Maracay; Venezuela	Hard	(Colombia) Alejandro González	(Venezuela) Piero Luisi (Venezuela) Román Recarte
USA F11 Futures $10,000	May 11	Tampa; USA	Clay	(Canada) Philip Bester	(Australia) Adam Hubble (Australia) Kaden Hensel
Brazil F2 Futures $15,000	May 11	Caldas Novas; Brazil	Hard	(Brazil) Carlos Oliveira	(Brazil) Fernando Romboli (Brazil) Nicolas Santos
Argentina F5 Futures $10,000	May 11	Villa María; Argentina	Clay	(Argentina) Marcos Conocente	(Argentina) Facundo Bagnis (Argentina) Diego Cristin
Bulgaria F2 Futures $10,000	May 11	Stara Zagora; Bulgaria	Clay	(North Macedonia) Predrag Rusevski	(Switzerland) Adrien Bossel (France) Pierrick Ysern
China F4 Futures $15,000	May 11	Wuhan; China P.R.	Hard	(China) Zeng Shaoxuan	(China) Bai Yan (China) Wu Di
Spain F16 Futures $10,000	May 11	Lleida; Spain	Clay	(Spain) Albert Ramos Viñolas	(Spain) José Checa Calvo (Spain) Pablo Santos
Romania F2 Futures $10,000	May 11	Bucharest; Romania	Clay	(Italy) Matteo Viola	(Moldova) Radu Albot (Moldova) Andrei Ciumac
Great Britain F7 Futures $10,000	May 11	Newcastle; Great Britain	Clay	(France) David Guez	(Republic of Ireland) James McGee (Republic of Ireland) Colin O'Brien
Romania F3 Futures $10,000	May 18	Pitești; Romania	Clay	(Ukraine) Artem Smirnov	(Greece) Alexandros Jakupovic (Romania) Bogdan Leonte
Spain F17 Futures $10,000	May 18	Valldoreix; Spain	Clay	(Spain) Adrián Menéndez Maceiras	(Spain) Adrián Menéndez Maceiras (Spain) Georgi Rumenov Payakov
Kuwait F1 Futures $15,000	May 18	Mishref; Kuwait	Hard	(Kuwait) Mohammad Ghareeb	(Finland) Henri Kontinen (Germany) Sebastian Rieschick
Poland F1 Futures $15,000	May 18	Katowice; Poland	Clay	(Slovakia) Pavol Červenák	(Poland) Jerzy Janowicz (Poland) Mateusz Kowalczyk
Bulgaria F3 Futures $10,000	May 18	Stara Zagora; Bulgaria	Clay	(United States) Nikita Kryvonos	(Ukraine) Gleb Alekseenko (Ukraine) Vadim Alekseenko
Argentina F6 Futures $10,000	May 18	Villa del Dique; Argentina	Clay	(Argentina) Federico Cavallero	(Argentina) Diego Cristin (Argentina) Andrés Molteni
Brazil F3 Futures $15,000	May 18	Uberlândia; Brazil	Clay	(Brazil) Júlio Silva	(Brazil) Fernando Romboli (Brazil) Júlio Silva
Venezuela F2 Futures $10,000	May 18	Mérida; Venezuela	Hard	(Colombia) Alejandro González	(Colombia) Alejandro González (Colombia) Eduardo Struvay
Czech Rep. F3 Futures $10,000	May 18	Jablonec nad Nisou; Czech Republic	Clay	(Hungary) Ádám Kellner	(Czech Republic) Roman Jebavý (Slovakia) Martin Kližan
Bosnia & Herzegovina F3 Futures $10,000	May 18	Brčko; Bosnia and Herzegovina	Clay	(Croatia) Nikola Mektić	(Serbia) Ivan Bjelica (Serbia) Aleksandar Cvetkov
Mexico F6 Futures $10,000	May 18	Guadalajara; Mexico	Clay	(Mexico) Miguel Gallardo Valles	(Mexico) Miguel Gallardo Valles (Mexico) Carlos Palencia
Italy F11 Futures $15,000	May 18	Parma; Italy	Clay	(Italy) Andrea Arnaboldi	(Argentina) Juan-Martín Aranguren (Italy) Walter Trusendi
Italy F12 Futures $15,000	May 25	Cesena; Italy	Clay	(Spain) Guillermo Alcaide	(Spain) Guillermo Alcaide (Russia) Nikolai Nesterov
Bosnia & Herzegovina F4 Futures $10,000	May 25	Prijedor; Bosnia and Herzegovina	Clay	(France) Thomas Cazes-Carrère	(Russia) Andrei Levine (Russia) Andrei Plotniy
Brazil F4 Futures $10,000	May 25	Ribeirão Preto; Brazil	Clay	(Brazil) Fernando Romboli	(Brazil) Fernando Romboli (Brazil) Júlio Silva
Venezuela F3 Futures $15,000	May 25	Maracaibo; Venezuela	Hard	(Venezuela) José de Armas	(Colombia) Sat Galan (Colombia) Michael Quintero
Slovenia F1 Futures $10,000	May 25	Domžale; Slovenia	Clay	(Slovakia) Andrej Martin	(Argentina) Alejandro Domínguez (Germany) Nils Langer
Mexico F7 Futures $10,000	May 25	Celaya; Mexico	Hard	(Argentina) Maximiliano Estévez	(Canada) Chris Klingemann (New Zealand) Adam Thompson
Argentina F7 Futures $10,000	May 25	Villa María; Argentina	Clay	(Chile) Jorge Aguilar	(Chile) Jorge Aguilar (Chile) Rodrigo Pérez
Egypt F7 Futures $10,000	May 25	Alexandria; Egypt	Clay	(New Zealand) Rubin Statham	(Egypt) Karim Maamoun (Egypt) Sherif Sabry
Bulgaria F4 Futures $10,000	May 25	Yambol; Bulgaria	Clay	(Bulgaria) Valentin Dimov	(North Macedonia) Ilija Martinoski (North Macedonia) Predrag Rusevski
Kuwait F2 Futures $15,000	May 25	Mishref; Kuwait	Hard	(Kuwait) Mohammad Ghareeb	(Finland) Henri Kontinen (Germany) Sebastian Rieschick
Poland F2 Futures $10,000	May 25	Kraków; Poland	Clay	(Ukraine) Denys Molchanov	(Germany) Martin Emmrich (Chile) Hans Podlipnik Castillo
Spain F18 Futures $10,000	May 25	Telde; Spain	Clay	(Spain) Sergio Gutiérrez Ferrol	(Spain) Marc Fornell Mestres (Spain) Gerard Granollers
Romania F4 Futures $10,000	May 25	Bucharest; Romania	Clay	(Romania) Petru-Alexandru Luncanu	(Greece) Alexandros Jakupovic (France) Alexandre Renard

=== June ===
Tournament	Date	City	Surface	Singles champions	Doubles champions
Romania F5 Futures $10,000	June 1	Bacău; Romania	Clay	(Switzerland) Alexander Sadecky	(Germany) Tobias Klein (Switzerland) Alexander Sadecky
Spain F19 Futures $15,000	June 1	Lanzarote; Spain	Hard	(Spain) José Checa Calvo	(Spain) José Checa Calvo (Spain) Guillermo Olaso
Poland F3 Futures $10,000	June 1	Koszalin; Poland	Clay	(Belarus) Uladzimir Ignatik	(Germany) Martin Emmrich (Germany) Lars Pörschke
Egypt F8 Futures $10,000	June 1	Ain Sokhna; Egypt	Clay	(Egypt) Karim Maamoun	(United States) Adam El Mihdawy (New Zealand) Mikal Statham
Serbia F1 Futures $10,000	June 1	Belgrade; Serbia	Clay	(Serbia) Nikola Ćirić	(Russia) Andrei Levine (Russia) Andrei Plotniy
Mexico F8 Futures $10,000	June 1	León, Guanajuato; Mexico	Hard	(Mexico) Bruno Rodríguez	(Mexico) Juan Manuel Elizondo (Mexico) César Ramírez
Slovenia F2 Futures $10,000	June 1	Maribor; Slovenia	Clay	(Slovenia) Marko Tkalec	(France) Thomas Cazes-Carrère (Australia) Jarryd Maher
Tunisia F1 Futures $10,000	June 1	Hammamet; Tunisia	Clay	(Morocco) Reda El Amrani	(Italy) Valerio Carrese (Italy) Matteo Viola
Brazil F5 Futures $10,000	June 1	Fortaleza; Brazil	Clay	(Brazil) Leonardo Kirche	(Brazil) Alexandre Bonatto (Argentina) Cristhian Ignacio Benedetti
Italy F13 Futures $10,000	June 1	Bergamo; Italy	Clay	(Austria) Philipp Oswald	(Italy) Fabio Colangelo (Italy) Daniele Giorgini
Italy F14 Futures $10,000	June 8	Mestre; Italy	Clay	(Russia) Andrey Kuznetsov	(Argentina) Juan-Martín Aranguren (Italy) Federico Torresi
Brazil F6 Futures $10,000	June 8	Araguari; Brazil	Clay	(Brazil) Alexandre Bonatto	(Brazil) Eric Gomes (Brazil) Fernando Romboli
USA F12 Futures $15,000	June 8	Loomis, California; USA	Hard	(United States) Jesse Witten	(United States) Austin Krajicek (United States) Conor Pollock
Tunisia F2 Futures $10,000	June 8	Sfax; Tunisia	Hard	(Morocco) Reda El Amrani	(Morocco) Reda El Amrani (France) Alexandre Penaud
Slovenia F3 Futures $10,000	June 8	Koper; Slovenia	Clay	(France) Benoît Paire	(Ukraine) Denys Molchanov (Canada) Milos Raonic
Serbia F2 Futures $10,000	June 8	Belgrade; Serbia	Clay	(Montenegro) Goran Tošić	(Serbia) Darko Mađarovski (Serbia) Aleksander Slovic
Argentina F8 Futures $10,000	June 8	Rafaela; Argentina	Clay	(Argentina) Marco Trungelliti	(Paraguay) Daniel-Alejandro Lopez Cassaccia (Argentina) Nicolas Pastor
Egypt F9 Futures $10,000	June 8	Giza; Egypt	Clay	(Egypt) Karim Maamoun	(Egypt) Karim Maamoun (Egypt) Sherif Sabry
Japan F4 Futures $10,000	June 8	Karuizawa; Japan	Clay	(Japan) Hiroki Kondo	(Japan) Satoshi Iwabuchi (Japan) Hiroki Kondo
Netherlands F1 Futures $15,000	June 8	Apeldoorn; Netherlands	Clay	(Netherlands) Thomas Schoorel	(Germany) Holger Fischer (Germany) Gero Kretschmer
Spain F20 Futures $10,000	June 8	La Palma; Spain	Hard	(Spain) Pedro Clar	(Spain) Gerard Granollers (Spain) Adrián Menéndez Maceiras
Spain F21 Futures $15,000	June 15	Puerto de la Cruz; Spain	Carpet	(Portugal) João Sousa	(Spain) Agustin Boje-Ordonez (Spain) Adrián Menéndez Maceiras
Netherlands F2 Futures $15,000	June 15	Alkmaar; Netherlands	Clay	(Germany) Gero Kretschmer	(Australia) Adam Hubble (Australia) Kaden Hensel
Japan F5 Futures $10,000	June 15	Kusatsu; Japan	Carpet	(Japan) Hiroki Moriya	(Thailand) Weerapat Doakmaiklee (Japan) Yuichi Ito
Malaysia F1 Futures $10,000	June 15	Kuala Lumpur; Malaysia	Hard	(Italy) Luigi D'Agord	(Spain) Arnau Brugués Davi (Italy) Luigi D'Agord
Germany F6 Futures $15,000	June 15	Marburg; Germany	Clay	(Germany) Nils Langer	(Germany) Bastian Knittel (Germany) Sebastian Rieschick
France F8 Futures $15,000	June 15	Blois; France	Clay	(Monaco) Benjamin Balleret	(France) Julien Jeanpierre (France) Nicolas Renavand
Egypt F10 Futures $10,000	June 15	Giza; Egypt	Clay	(Egypt) Sherif Sabry	(Egypt) Karim Maamoun (Egypt) Sherif Sabry
Argentina F9 Futures $10,000	June 15	Obera; Argentina	Clay	(Argentina) Andrés Molteni	(Argentina) Guillermo Bujniewicz (Argentina) Gonzalo Tur
Morocco F3 Futures $10,000	June 15	Rabat; Morocco	Clay	(Morocco) Reda El Amrani	(Belgium) Maxime Authom (France) Grégoire Burquier
Serbia F3 Futures $10,000	June 15	Belgrade; Serbia	Clay	(Montenegro) Goran Tošić	(Sweden) Daniel Danilović (Montenegro) Goran Tošić
Tunisia F3 Futures $10,000	June 15	Kelibia; Tunisia	Hard	(Tunisia) Malek Jaziri	(Italy) Uros Vico (Italy) Matteo Volante
Ireland F1 Futures $15,000	June 15	Dublin; Ireland	Carpet	(Switzerland) Alexander Sadecky	(France) Charles-Antoine Brézac (France) Vincent Stouff
USA F13 Futures $15,000	June 15	Sacramento, California; USA	Hard	(Australia) Carsten Ball	(United States) Lester Cook (Philippines) Treat Huey
Brazil F7 Futures $10,000	June 15	Brasília; Brazil	Clay	(Brazil) Leonardo Kirche	(Brazil) Alexandre Bonatto (Brazil) Fernando Romboli
Italy F15 Futures $15,000	June 15	Padova; Italy	Clay	(Austria) Philipp Oswald	(France) Alexandre Renard (Italy) Federico Torresi
Norway F1 Futures $15,000	June 15	Svingvoll; Norway	Hard	(United States) Michael McClune	(Finland) Henri Kontinen (Finland) Timo Nieminen
Norway F2 Futures $15,000	June 22	Gausdal; Norway	Hard	(United Kingdom) Daniel Cox	(Sweden) Patrik Rosenholm (Sweden) Milos Sekulic
Italy F16 Futures $10,000	June 22	Castelfranco; Italy	Clay	(Hungary) Ádám Kellner	(Italy) Federico Torresi (Italy) Luca Vanni
Brazil F8 Futures $10,000	June 22	Divinopolis; Brazil	Clay	(Brazil) Fernando Romboli	(Brazil) Tiago Lopes (Brazil) Fabrício Neis
USA F14 Futures $15,000	June 22	Chico, California; USA	Hard	(United States) Ryan Harrison	(South Korea) Daniel Yoo (United States) Denis Zivkovic
Ireland F2 Futures $15,000	June 22	Fitzwilliam; Ireland	Carpet	(France) Charles-Antoine Brézac	(United States) Ashwin Kumar (Sweden) Andreas Siljeström
Morocco F4 Futures $10,000	June 22	Kenitra; Morocco	Clay	(Morocco) Rabie Chaki	(Switzerland) Adrien Bossel (Belgium) Julien Dubail
Argentina F10 Futures $10,000	June 22	Posadas; Argentina	Clay	(Argentina) Juan-Martín Aranguren	(Argentina) Nicolas Jara-Lozano (Argentina) Andrés Molteni
France F9 Futures $15,000	June 22	Toulon; France	Clay	(France) David Guez	(France) Augustin Gensse (Portugal) Leonardo Tavares
Germany F7 Futures $10,000	June 22	Trier; Germany	Clay	(France) Éric Prodon	(Germany) Dustin Brown (Germany) Kevin Deden
Malaysia F2 Futures $10,000	June 22	Petaling Jaya; Malaysia	Hard	(Italy) Luigi D'Agord	(Spain) Arnau Brugués Davi (Italy) Luigi D'Agord
Japan F6 Futures $10,000	June 22	Akishima; Japan	Carpet	(Chinese Taipei) Yi Chu-huan	(Chinese Taipei) Chen I-ta (Chinese Taipei) Yi Chu-huan
Netherlands F3 Futures $15,000	June 22	Rotterdam; Netherlands	Clay	(Uzbekistan) Farrukh Dustov	(United States) Rylan Rizza (New Zealand) Rubin Statham
Spain F22 Futures $10,000	June 22	Melilla; Spain	Hard	(Spain) Pablo Carreño Busta	(Spain) Ignacio Coll Riudavets (Spain) Andoni Vivanco-Guzmán
Japan F7 Futures $10,000	June 29	Sapporo; Japan	Clay	(Japan) Yūichi Sugita	(Japan) Hiroki Kondo (Japan) Takao Suzuki
Malaysia F3 Futures $10,000	June 29	Kuala Lumpur; Malaysia	Hard	(Chinese Taipei) Chen Ti	(Chinese Taipei) Yang Tsung-hua (China) Yu Xinyuan
Germany F8 Futures $15,000	June 29	Kassel; Germany	Clay	(Austria) Johannes Ager	(Uzbekistan) Farrukh Dustov (United States) Rylan Rizza
France F10 Futures $15,000	June 29	Montauban; France	Clay	(Austria) Andreas Haider-Maurer	(France) Charles-Antoine Brézac (France) Philippe De Bonnevie
Romania F8 Futures $10,000	June 29	Mediaș; Romania	Clay	(Romania) Victor Ioniță	(Ukraine) Aleksandr Agafonov (Russia) Victor Kozin
Morocco F5 Futures $10,000	June 29	Khemisset; Morocco	Clay	(France) Grégoire Burquier	(France) Marc Auradou (France) Philippe Frayssinoux
USA F15 Futures $10,000	June 29	Rochester, New York; USA	Clay	(Greece) Vasilis Mazarakis	(United States) Marcus Fugate (United States) Cory Parr
Italy F17 Futures $15,000	June 29	Bologna; Italy	Clay	(Slovakia) Kamil Čapkovič	(Czech Republic) Roman Jebavý (Slovakia) Martin Kližan
India F5 Futures $15,000	June 29	New Delhi; India	Hard	(India) Yuki Bhambri	(India) Divij Sharan (India) Vishnu Vardhan

=== July ===
Tournament	Date	City	Surface	Singles champions	Doubles champions
India F6 Futures $15,000	July 6	New Delhi; India	Hard	(India) Vishnu Vardhan	(India) Divij Sharan (India) Vishnu Vardhan
USA F16 Futures $10,000	July 6	Pittsburgh; USA	Clay	(United States) Denis Zivkovic	(Barbados) Haydn Lewis (United States) Denis Zivkovic
Syria F1 Futures $15,000	July 6	Damascus; Syria	Hard	(Tunisia) Haythem Abid	(Australia) Sadik Kadir (Solomon Islands) Michael Leong
Italy F18 Futures $15,000	July 6	Carpi; Italy	Clay	(Italy) Francesco Aldi	(Italy) Paolo Beninca (Italy) Lorenzo Giustino
France F11 Futures $15,000	July 6	Bourg-en-Bresse; France	Clay	(France) David Guez	(Austria) Andreas Haider-Maurer (Germany) Bastian Knittel
Germany F9 Futures $10,000	July 6	Römerberg; Germany	Clay	(Romania) Petru-Alexandru Luncanu	(Canada) Érik Chvojka (Czech Republic) Roman Jebavý
Romania F9 Futures $10,000	July 6	Iași; Romania	Clay	(Romania) Victor Ioniță	(Ukraine) Gleb Alekseenko (Ukraine) Vadim Alekseenko
Great Britain F8 Futures $15,000	July 6	Felixstowe; Great Britain	Grass	(Switzerland) Alexander Sadecky	(Australia) Greg Jones (Australia) Robert Smeets
Austria F4 Futures $10,000	July 6	Vandans; Austria	Clay	(Austria) Johannes Ager	(Germany) Andre Begemann (Germany) Lars Pörschke
Italy F19 Futures $10,000	July 13	Palazzolo; Italy	Clay	(Chile) Guillermo Hormazábal	(Italy) Claudio Grassi (Chile) Guillermo Hormazábal
France F12 Futures $15,000	July 13	Saint-Gervais; France	Clay	(Spain) Adrián Menéndez Maceiras	(France) Fabrice Martin (Canada) Adil Shamasdin
Germany F10 Futures $10,000	July 13	Aschaffenburg; Germany	Clay	(Netherlands) Thomas Schoorel	(Netherlands) Roy Bruggeling (Netherlands) Bas van der Valk
Spain F23 Futures $10,000	July 13	Elche; Spain	Clay	(Canada) Steven Diez	(France) Guillaume De Verbizier (France) Dorian Descloix
Georgia F1 Futures $15,000	July 13	Tbilisi; Georgia	Clay	(Italy) Matteo Marrai	(United Kingdom) James Feaver (Republic of Ireland) Barry King
Austria F5 Futures $10,000	July 13	Telfs; Austria	Clay	(Austria) Johannes Ager	(Austria) Gerald Melzer (Austria) Philipp Oswald
Romania F10 Futures $10,000	July 13	Cluj; Romania	Clay	(Romania) Cătălin-Ionuț Gârd	(Ukraine) Gleb Alekseenko (Ukraine) Vadim Alekseenko
Estonia F1 Futures $15,000	July 13	Tallinn; Estonia	Clay	(Estonia) Jürgen Zopp	(Estonia) Mait Künnap (Estonia) Jürgen Zopp
Great Britain F9 Futures $15,000	July 13	Frinton; Great Britain	Grass	(United Kingdom) Joshua Milton	(Republic of Ireland) Tristan Farron-Mahon (Republic of Ireland) Colin O'Brien
Syria F2 Futures $15,000	July 13	Damascus; Syria	Hard	(Slovakia) Ivo Klec	(Egypt) Motaz Abou El Khair (Tunisia) Haythem Abid
USA F17 Futures $10,000	July 13	Peoria, Illinois; USA	Clay	(New Zealand) Michael Venus	(Canada) Vasek Pospisil (Canada) Milos Raonic
Korea Rep. F5 Futures $15,000	July 13	Gyeongsan; Korea Rep.	Hard	(Chinese Taipei) Chen Ti	(Chinese Taipei) Chen Ti (Chinese Taipei) Yang Tsung-hua
Venezuela F4 Futures $15,000	July 13	Puerto Ordaz; Venezuela	Hard	(Peru) Mauricio Echazú	(Venezuela) Luis David Martínez (Austria) Nikolaus Moser
Venezuela F5 Futures $10,000	July 20	Caracas; Venezuela	Hard	(Austria) Nikolaus Moser	(Venezuela) Luis David Martínez (Austria) Nikolaus Moser
Korea Rep. F6 Futures $15,000	July 20	Gyeongsan; Korea Rep.	Hard	(South Korea) Kim Young-jun	(Chinese Taipei) Lee Hsin-han (Chinese Taipei) Yang Tsung-hua
USA F18 Futures $10,000	July 20	Joplin, Missouri; USA	Hard	(United States) Blake Strode	(United States) Todd Paul (United States) Cory Parr
Italy F20 Futures $15,000	July 20	Modena; Italy	Clay	(Belgium) Niels Desein	(Belgium) Niels Desein (Belgium) Yannick Mertens
Germany F11 Futures $10,000	July 20	Cologne; Germany	Clay	(Slovakia) Pavol Červenák	(Bosnia and Herzegovina) Tomislav Brkić (Croatia) Ante Pavić
Spain F24 Futures $10,000	July 20	Gandia; Spain	Clay	(Spain) Sergio Gutiérrez Ferrol	(Spain) José Checa Calvo (Spain) Carlos Calderón-Rodriguez
Georgia F2 Futures $15,000	July 20	Tbilisi; Georgia	Clay	(Tunisia) Malek Jaziri	(Ukraine) Ivan Anikanov (Ukraine) Artem Smirnov
Austria F6 Futures $10,000	July 20	Kramsach; Austria	Clay	(Slovakia) Andrej Martin	(Austria) Pascal Brunner (Austria) Philip Lang
Romania F11 Futures $10,000	July 20	Oradea; Romania	Clay	(Hungary) György Balázs	(Hungary) György Balázs (Hungary) Attila Balázs
Estonia F2 Futures $10,000	July 20	Kuressaare; Estonia	Clay (i)	(France) Axel Michon	(Finland) Harri Heliövaara (Finland) Henri Kontinen
Italy F21 Futures $15,000	July 27	La Spezia; Italy	Clay	(Italy) Daniele Giorgini	(Italy) Claudio Grassi (Italy) Walter Trusendi
Germany F12 Futures $15,000	July 27	Dortmund; Germany	Clay	(Spain) Adrián Menéndez Maceiras	(Czech Republic) Jaroslav Pospíšil (France) Alexandre Renard
Spain F25 Futures $10,000	July 27	Dénia; Spain	Clay	(Portugal) Pedro Sousa	(Spain) Carlos Calderón-Rodriguez (Spain) Marc Giner
Great Britain F10 Futures $15,000	July 27	Ilkley; Great Britain	Grass	(Austria) Martin Fischer	(United Kingdom) Chris Eaton (Austria) Martin Fischer
USA F19 Futures $10,000	July 27	Godfrey, Illinois; USA	Hard	(Australia) Matt Reid	(United States) Todd Paul (United States) Cory Parr
Brazil F12 Futures $10,000	July 27	Bauru; Brazil	Clay	(Brazil) Tiago Lopes	(Argentina) Patricio Heras (Argentina) Agustin Picco
Venezuela F6 Futures $10,000	July 27	Caracas; Venezuela	Hard	(Argentina) Andrés Molteni	(Colombia) Michael Quintero (Venezuela) Yohny Romero
Latvia F1 Futures $10,000	July 27	Jūrmala; Latvia	Clay	(Chile) Hans Podlipnik Castillo	(Republic of Ireland) Tristan Farron-Mahon (Denmark) Thomas Kromann

=== August ===
Tournament	Date	City	Surface	Singles champions	Doubles champions
Egypt F11 Futures $10,000	August 3	Cairo; Egypt	Clay	(Egypt) Sherif Sabry	(Morocco) Anas Fattar (Morocco) Younès Rachidi
Brazil F13 Futures $10,000	August 3	Juiz de Fora; Brazil	Clay	(Argentina) Juan-Pablo Villar	(Bolivia) Mauricio Doria-Medina (Argentina) Gaston-Arturo Grimolizzi
China F5 Futures $10,000	August 3	Chongqing; China P.R.	Hard	(China) Zeng Shaoxuan	(China) Zeng Shaoxuan (China) Zhang Ze
USA F20 Futures $10,000	August 3	Decatur, Illinois; USA	Hard	(Spain) Arnau Brugués Davi	(United States) Todd Paul (United States) Cory Parr
Ecuador F1 Futures $10,000	August 3	Guayaquil; Ecuador	Hard	(Ecuador) Emilio Gómez	(Ecuador) Julio César Campozano (Ecuador) Walter Valarezo
Italy F22 Futures $10,000	August 3	Avezzano; Italy	Clay	(Montenegro) Goran Tošić	(Sweden) Daniel Danilović (Montenegro) Goran Tošić
Germany F13 Futures $10,000	August 3	Wetzlar; Germany	Clay	(Germany) Bastian Knittel	(Netherlands) Roy Bruggeling (Netherlands) Bas van der Valk
Spain F27 Futures $10,000	August 3	Bakio; Spain	Hard	(France) Laurent Rochette	(Spain) Georgi Rumenov Payakov (Spain) Andoni Vivanco-Guzmán
Spain F26 Futures $10,000	August 3	Xàtiva; Spain	Clay	(Spain) José Checa Calvo	(Spain) Agustin Boje-Ordonez (Spain) Marcelo Palacios-Siegenthale
Great Britain F11 Futures $15,000	August 3	Ottershaw; Great Britain	Hard	(Slovakia) Ivo Klec	(United Kingdom) Timothy Bradshaw (United Kingdom) Dominic Inglot
Lithuania F1 Futures $10,000	August 3	Vilnius; Lithuania	Clay	(Finland) Henri Kontinen	(France) Grégoire Burquier (France) Thomas Cazes-Carrère
Slovak Rep. F1 Futures $10,000	August 3	Stupava; Slovakia	Clay	(Slovakia) Martin Kližan	(Poland) Mateusz Kowalczyk (Poland) Grzegorz Panfil
Serbia F4 Futures $10,000	August 3	Novi Sad; Serbia	Clay	(Serbia) Dejan Katic	(Serbia) Ivan Bjelica (Serbia) Miljan Zekić
Russia F3 Futures $15,000	August 3	Moscow; Russia	Clay	(France) Guillaume Rufin	(Russia) Ilya Belyaev (Russia) Evgeny Donskoy
Iran F5 Futures $15,000	August 3	Tehran; Iran	Clay	(Tunisia) Haythem Abid	(Indonesia) Christopher Rungkat (Indonesia) Sunu Wahyu Trijati
Iran F6 Futures $15,000	August 10	Tehran; Iran	Clay	(Tunisia) Haythem Abid	(Uzbekistan) Murad Inoyatov (Russia) Stepan Khotulev
Slovak Rep. F2 Futures $10,000	August 10	Piešťany; Slovakia	Clay	(United Kingdom) Aljaž Bedene	(Slovakia) Michal Pazicky (Slovakia) Adrian Sikora
Italy F23 Futures $15,000	August 10	Bolzano; Italy	Clay	(Slovakia) Martin Kližan	(Italy) Manuel Jorquera (Portugal) Leonardo Tavares
Germany F14 Futures $10,000	August 10	Friedberg; Germany	Clay	(Germany) Lars Pörschke	(Austria) Christian Magg (Austria) Herbert Wiltschnig
Spain F28 Futures $15,000	August 10	Irun; Spain	Clay	(France) Charles-Antoine Brézac	(Spain) Georgi Rumenov Payakov (Portugal) João Sousa
Belgium F1 Futures $10,000	August 10	Eupen; Belgium	Clay	(Belgium) Yannick Vandenbulcke	(France) Dorian Descloix (France) Maxime Teixeira
Russia F4 Futures $15,000	August 10	Moscow; Russia	Clay	(Russia) Andrey Kuznetsov	(Ukraine) Ivan Anikanov (Ukraine) Artem Smirnov
Serbia F5 Futures $10,000	August 10	Sombor; Serbia	Clay	(Serbia) Dušan Lajović	(Serbia) Vladimir Obradović (Serbia) Aleksander Slovic
Finland F1 Futures $10,000	August 10	Vierumäki; Finland	Clay	(Finland) Timo Nieminen	(Republic of Ireland) Tristan Farron-Mahon (Sweden) Andreas Siljeström
Ecuador F2 Futures $10,000	August 10	Guayaquil; Ecuador	Clay	(Ecuador) Julio César Campozano	(Ecuador) Patricio Alvarado (Ecuador) Diego Acosta
Brazil F14 Futures $10,000	August 10	Barueri; Brazil	Hard	(Australia) Nima Roshan	(Bolivia) Mauricio Doria-Medina (Brazil) Rodrigo-Antonio Grilli
China F6 Futures $10,000	August 10	Jiaxing; China P.R.	Hard	(Japan) Yuichi Ito	(China) Gong Maoxin (China) Xue Feng
Colombia F3 Futures $15,000	August 10	Barranquilla; Colombia	Clay	(Colombia) Alejandro González	(Argentina) Andrés Molteni (Argentina) Gonzalo Tur
Egypt F12 Futures $10,000	August 10	Cairo; Egypt	Clay	(Egypt) Sherif Sabry	(Germany) Omar Altmann (Lebanon) Bassam Beidas
Egypt F13 Futures $10,000	August 17	Cairo; Egypt	Clay	(Egypt) Karim Maamoun	(Germany) Omar Altmann (Lebanon) Bassam Beidas
Thailand F1 Futures $10,000	August 17	Nonthaburi; Thailand	Hard	(Thailand) Kittipong Wachiramanowong	(Austria) Nikolaus Moser (Canada) Milos Raonic
India F7 Futures $10,000	August 17	New Delhi; India	Hard	(South Korea) Kim Young-jun	(India) Ashutosh Singh (India) Vishnu Vardhan
Colombia F4 Futures $15,000	August 17	Bogotá; Colombia	Clay	(Uruguay) Marcel Felder	(Ecuador) Julio César Campozano (Colombia) Juan Sebastián Cabal
China F7 Futures $10,000	August 17	Ningbo; China P.R.	Hard	(South Korea) Cho Min-hyeok	(China) Li Zhe (China) Wang Yu
Serbia F7 Futures $10,000	August 17	Kruševac; Serbia	Clay	(Serbia) Ivan Bjelica	(Serbia) Aleksander Slovic (Bosnia and Herzegovina) Aldin Šetkić
Brazil F15 Futures $10,000	August 17	Rio Claro; Brazil	Clay	(Argentina) Juan-Pablo Amado	(France) Marc Auradou (Brazil) Leonardo Kirche
Ecuador F3 Futures $10,000	August 17	Quito; Ecuador	Clay	(Argentina) Facundo Bagnis	(United States) Christian Guevara (United States) Maciek Sykut
Poland F4 Futures $15,000	August 17	Olsztyn; Poland	Clay	(Belarus) Uladzimir Ignatik	(Poland) Błażej Koniusz (Poland) Grzegorz Panfil
Russia F5 Futures $15,000	August 17	Moscow; Russia	Clay	(Russia) Aleksandr Lobkov	(Ukraine) Ivan Anikanov (Ukraine) Artem Smirnov
Italy F24 Futures $15,000	August 17	Este; Italy	Clay	(Italy) Stefano Galvani	(Italy) Federico Torresi (Italy) Luca Vanni
Spain F29 Futures $15,000	August 17	Santander; Spain	Clay	(Spain) Cesar Ferrer Victoria	(Spain) Carlos Calderón-Rodriguez (Spain) Gerard Granollers
Austria F7 Futures $10,000	August 17	St. Polten; Austria	Clay	(United Kingdom) Aljaž Bedene	(Slovenia) Andraž Bedene (United Kingdom) Aljaž Bedene
Croatia F6 Futures $10,000	August 17	Vinkovci; Croatia	Clay	(Croatia) Nikola Mektić	(Croatia) Roman Kelecic (Croatia) Joško Topić
Romania F14 Futures $10,000	August 17	Arad; Romania	Clay	(Hungary) Attila Balázs	(Romania) Marius Copil (Canada) Vasek Pospisil
Belgium F2 Futures $10,000	August 17	Koksijde; Belgium	Clay	(United Kingdom) Daniel Smethurst	(Morocco) Rabie Chaki (Belgium) Frederic De Fays
Poland F5 Futures $15,000	August 24	Poznań; Poland	Clay	(Czech Republic) Dušan Lojda	(Poland) Piotr Gadomski (Serbia) David Savić
Italy F25 Futures $15,000	August 24	Piombino; Italy	Hard	(Italy) Daniele Bracciali	(Italy) Claudio Grassi (Italy) Alessandro Giannessi
Spain F30 Futures $15,000	August 24	Oviedo; Spain	Clay	(Spain) Gabriel Trujillo Soler	(Spain) Gabriel Trujillo Soler (Spain) Andoni Vivanco-Guzmán
Austria F8 Futures $10,000	August 24	Pörtschach; Austria	Clay	(Slovenia) Janez Semrajc	(Austria) Richard Ruckelshausen (Austria) Bertram Steinberger
Croatia F7 Futures $10,000	August 24	Čakovec; Croatia	Clay	(Croatia) Nikola Mektić	(Croatia) Nikola Mektić (Croatia) Ivan Zovko
Netherlands F4 Futures $15,000	August 24	Enschede; Netherlands	Clay	(Netherlands) Boy Westerhof	(Netherlands) Antal van der Duim (Netherlands) Boy Westerhof
Romania F15 Futures $10,000	August 24	Brașov; Romania	Clay	(Romania) Andrei Mlendea	(Spain) Carlos Calderón-Rodriguez (Spain) Gerard Granollers
Belgium F3 Futures $10,000	August 24	Jupille-sur-Meuse; Belgium	Clay	(Belgium) Maxime Authom	(Belgium) Arnaud Fontaine (Belgium) Andy Minguet
Russia F6 Futures $10,000	August 24	Sochi; Russia	Clay	(Georgia (country)) Nikoloz Basilashvili	(Russia) Victor Kozin (Russia) Andrey Kumantsov
Israel F4 Futures $10,000	August 24	Ramat HaSharon; Israel	Hard	(Israel) Noam Okun	(United States) John Paul Fruttero (New Zealand) G.D. Jones
Brazil F16 Futures $10,000	August 24	Sao Jose Do Rio Preto; Brazil	Clay	(Chile) Jorge Aguilar	(Brazil) André Miele (Brazil) Fernando Romboli
Bolivia F1 Futures $10,000	August 24	Santa Cruz; Bolivia	Clay	(Argentina) Guido Pella	(Argentina) Diego Cristin (Argentina) Guido Pella
Germany F16 Futures $10,000	August 24	Überlingen; Germany	Clay	(Germany) Dennis Bloemke	(Germany) Dennis Bloemke (Australia) Jarryd Maher
Colombia F5 Futures $15,000	August 24	Medellín; Colombia	Clay	(Colombia) Alejandro González	(Colombia) Juan Sebastián Cabal (Colombia) Alejandro González
India F8 Futures $10,000	August 24	New Delhi; India	Hard	(India) Yuki Bhambri	(United Kingdom) Timothy Bradshaw (United Kingdom) Max Jones
Thailand F2 Futures $10,000	August 24	Nonthaburi; Thailand	Hard	(Canada) Milos Raonic	(Indonesia) Nesa Arta (Indonesia) Christopher Rungkat
Thailand F3 Futures $10,000	August 31	Nonthaburi; Thailand	Hard	(United Kingdom) Jamie Baker	(Chinese Taipei) Lee Hsin-han (Chinese Taipei) Yang Tsung-hua
India F9 Futures $10,000	August 31	New Delhi; India	Hard	(South Korea) Kim Young-jun	(United Kingdom) Chris Eaton (India) Rohan Gajjar
Turkey F7 Futures $10,000	August 31	Ankara; Turkey	Clay	(Italy) Marco Simoni	(Japan) Junn Mitsuhashi (Germany) Alexander Satschko
Israel F5 Futures $10,000	August 31	Ramat HaSharon; Israel	Hard	(Israel) Noam Okun	(United States) John Paul Fruttero (New Zealand) G.D. Jones
Italy F26 Futures $10,000	August 31	Trieste; Italy	Clay	(Italy) Daniele Giorgini	(Italy) Filippo Leonardi (Italy) Jacopo Marchegiani
Germany F17A Futures $10,000	August 31	Kempten; Germany	Clay	(Germany) Dennis Bloemke	(Moldova) Radu Albot (Czech Republic) Jiří Školoudík
Bulgaria F7 Futures $10,000	August 31	Dobrich; Bulgaria	Clay	(Spain) Oscar Sabate-Bretos	(Spain) Carlos Calderón-Rodriguez (Spain) Gerard Granollers
Great Britain F12 Futures $10,000	August 31	Cumberland; Great Britain	Hard	(United Kingdom) Colin Fleming	(United Kingdom) Richard Bloomfield (United Kingdom) Barry Fulcher
Austria F9 Futures $10,000	August 31	Wels; Austria	Clay	(United Kingdom) Aljaž Bedene	(Austria) Richard Ruckelshausen (Austria) Bertram Steinberger
Croatia F8 Futures $10,000	August 31	Osijek; Croatia	Clay	(Croatia) Nikola Mektić	(Croatia) Marin Draganja (Croatia) Dino Marcan
Netherlands F5 Futures $15,000	August 31	Almere; Netherlands	Clay	(United States) Greg Ouellette	(Netherlands) Antal van der Duim (Netherlands) Boy Westerhof
Russia F7 Futures $10,000	August 31	Sergiyev Posad; Russia	Clay	(Russia) Evgeny Kirillov	(Ukraine) Ivan Anikanov (Russia) Andrey Kumantsov
Bolivia F2 Futures $10,000	August 31	Cochabamba; Bolivia	Clay	(Argentina) Guido Pella	(Argentina) Facundo Bagnis (Argentina) Guillermo Carry
Brazil F17 Futures $10,000	August 31	Uberaba; Brazil	Clay	(Chile) Jorge Aguilar	(Brazil) Tiago Lopes (Brazil) André Miele

=== September ===
Tournament	Date	City	Surface	Singles champions	Doubles champions
Argentina F14 Futures $10,000	September 7	Adrogué; Argentina	Clay	(Argentina) Jonathan Gonzalia	(Argentina) Andrés Molteni (Argentina) Gonzalo Tur
Germany F17B Futures $10,000	September 7	Kenn; Germany	Clay	(Germany) Marc Sieber	(Germany) Marc Sieber (Germany) Patrick Taubert
Bolivia F3 Futures $10,000	September 7	La Paz; Bolivia	Clay	(Argentina) Facundo Bagnis	(Bolivia) Mauricio Estívariz (Bolivia) Federico Zeballos
Burundi F1 Futures $10,000	September 7	Bujumbura; Burundi	Clay	(Czech Republic) Adam Vejmelka	(South Africa) Hendrik Coertzen (South Africa) Ruan Roelofse
Brazil F18 Futures $10,000	September 7	Fortaleza; Brazil	Clay	(Brazil) Fernando Romboli	(Brazil) Alexandre Bonatto (Brazil) Eladio Ribeiro Neto
Israel F6 Futures $10,000	September 7	Ramat HaSharon; Israel	Hard	(Israel) Noam Okun	(New Zealand) Marcus Daniell (Israel) Amir Weintraub
Italy F27 Futures $10,000	September 7	Siena; Italy	Clay	(Germany) Lars Pörschke	(Italy) Stefano Ianni (Italy) Matteo Volante
France F13 Futures $15,000	September 7	Bagnères-de-Bigorre; France	Hard	(France) Pierre Metenier	(China) Gong Maoxin (China) Zhang Ze
Great Britain F13 Futures $10,000	September 7	Wrexham; Great Britain	Hard	(Lithuania) Laurynas Grigelis	(United Kingdom) Chris Eaton (United Kingdom) Dominic Inglot
Turkey F8 Futures $15,000	September 7	Istanbul; Turkey	Hard	(Kazakhstan) Alexey Kedryuk	(Kazakhstan) Alexey Kedryuk (Japan) Junn Mitsuhashi
Russia F8 Futures $10,000	September 7	Volgograd; Russia	Hard	(Russia) Evgeny Kirillov	(Russia) Mikhail Fufygin (Russia) Vitali Reshetnikov
Portugal F4 Futures $15,000	September 14	Porto; Portugal	Clay	(United Kingdom) Daniel Smethurst	(Spain) Pedro Clar (Spain) Carlos Calderón-Rodriguez
Italy F28 Futures $15,000	September 14	Porto Torres; Italy	Hard	(Sweden) Filip Prpic	(Canada) Vasek Pospisil (United Kingdom) Marcus Willis
France F14 Futures $15,000	September 14	Mulhouse; France	Hard (i)	(Belgium) Niels Desein	(Belgium) Ruben Bemelmans (Belgium) Yannick Mertens
Spain F31 Futures $15,000	September 14	Móstoles; Spain	Hard	(France) David Guez	(Spain) David Canudas-Fernandez (Togo) Komlavi Loglo
Sweden F1 Futures $15,000	September 14	Lidköping; Sweden	Hard (i)	(Finland) Timo Nieminen	(Germany) Martin Emmrich (Sweden) Andreas Siljeström
Turkey F9 Futures $15,000	September 14	Istanbul; Turkey	Hard	(Belarus) Uladzimir Ignatik	(Kazakhstan) Alexey Kedryuk (Japan) Junn Mitsuhashi
Great Britain F14 Futures $10,000	September 14	Nottingham; Great Britain	Hard	(United Kingdom) Josh Goodall	(United Kingdom) Chris Eaton (United Kingdom) Dominic Inglot
USA F22 Futures $10,000	September 14	Claremont, California; USA	Hard	(United States) Matt Bocko	(United States) Brett Joelson (United States) Ashwin Kumar
Brazil F19 Futures $10,000	September 14	Recife; Brazil	Clay	(Brazil) Leonardo Kirche	(Brazil) André Miele (Brazil) Fernando Romboli
Rwanda F1 Futures $10,000	September 14	Kigali; Rwanda	Clay	(France) Gilles De Sousa	(South Africa) Hendrik Coertzen (South Africa) Ruan Roelofse
Bolivia F4 Futures $10,000	September 14	Tarija; Bolivia	Clay	(Argentina) Juan-Pablo Amado	(Argentina) Facundo Bagnis (Argentina) Guillermo Carry
Australia F5 Futures $15,000	September 14	Darwin; Australia	Hard	(Australia) Dayne Kelly	(Australia) Matthew Ebden (Australia) Sadik Kadir
Argentina F15 Futures $10,000	September 14	Tucumán; Argentina	Clay	(Argentina) Antonio Pastorino	(Argentina) Kevin Konfederak (Argentina) Leandro Migani
Argentina F16 Futures $10,000	September 21	Salta; Argentina	Clay	(Argentina) Jonathan Gonzalia	(Argentina) Alejandro Fabbri (Argentina) Leandro Migani
Australia F6 Futures $15,000	September 21	Darwin; Australia	Hard	(United Kingdom) Jamie Baker	(Australia) Adam Hubble (Australia) Kaden Hensel
Uganda F1 Futures $10,000	September 21	Kampala; Uganda	Clay	(France) Philippe De Bonnevie	(Romania) Bogdan Leonte (India) Rupesh Roy
Brazil F20 Futures $15,000	September 21	Cuiabá; Brazil	Clay	(Brazil) Tiago Lopes	(Brazil) Alexandre Bonatto (Brazil) Fernando Romboli
Mexico F9 Futures $10,000	September 21	León, Guanajuato; Mexico	Hard	(Spain) Arnau Brugués Davi	(Mexico) Juan Manuel Elizondo (Mexico) Miguel Gallardo Valles
USA F23 Futures $10,000	September 21	Costa Mesa, California; USA	Hard	(United States) Michael McClune	(United States) Robbye Poole (Norway) Erling Tveit
Greece F1 Futures $10,000	September 21	Kos; Greece	Hard	(Greece) Theodoros Angelinos	(Italy) Damiano Di Ienno (Italy) Claudio Grassi
Portugal F5 Futures $15,000	September 21	Espinho; Portugal	Clay	(Spain) Pedro Clar	(Portugal) Goncalo Falcao (Portugal) João Sousa
Italy F29 Futures $10,000	September 21	Alghero; Italy	Hard	(Canada) Vasek Pospisil	(Italy) Alessandro Giannessi (Italy) Federico Gaio
France F15 Futures $15,000	September 21	Plaisir; France	Hard (i)	(Belgium) Ruben Bemelmans	(France) Olivier Charroin (France) Alexandre Renard
Spain F32 Futures $15,000	September 21	Madrid; Spain	Hard	(Spain) Roberto Bautista Agut	(Netherlands) Romano Frantzen (Netherlands) Thomas Schoorel
Sweden F2 Futures $15,000	September 21	Falun; Sweden	Hard (i)	(Sweden) Pablo Figueroa	(Germany) Martin Emmrich (Sweden) Andreas Siljeström
Bosnia & Herzegovina F5 Futures $15,000	September 21	Mostar; Bosnia and Herzegovina	Clay	(Germany) Marc Sieber	(Croatia) Mislav Hizak (Croatia) Deni Zmak
Kazakhstan F3 Futures $10,000	September 21	Shymkent; Kazakhstan	Clay	(Kazakhstan) Alexey Kedryuk	(Russia) Mikhail Fufygin (Russia) Vitali Reshetnikov
Kazakhstan F4 Futures $10,000	September 28	Almaty; Kazakhstan	Hard (i)	(Kazakhstan) Alexey Kedryuk	(Ukraine) Ivan Anikanov (Russia) Andrey Kumantsov
Italy F30 Futures $10,000	September 28	Quartu Sant'Elena; Italy	Hard	(Canada) Vasek Pospisil	(Spain) Óscar Burrieza (Spain) Javier Martí
France F16 Futures $10,000	September 28	Sarreguemines; France	Carpet (i)	(Netherlands) Michel Koning	(Netherlands) Michel Koning (Netherlands Antilles) Martijn van Haasteren
Germany F18 Futures $10,000	September 28	HamBach; Germany	Carpet (i)	(Germany) Peter Gojowczyk	(United Kingdom) Dominic Inglot (United Kingdom) Max Jones
Spain F33 Futures $15,000	September 28	Martos; Spain	Hard	(Belarus) Uladzimir Ignatik	(Spain) Abraham Gonzalez-Jimenez (Spain) Carlos Rexach-Itoiz
Bosnia & Herzegovina F6 Futures $15,000	September 28	Mostar; Bosnia and Herzegovina	Clay	(Slovenia) Janez Semrajc	(Croatia) Marin Draganja (Croatia) Dino Marcan
Greece F2 Futures $10,000	September 28	Paros; Greece	Carpet	(Italy) Claudio Grassi	(United Kingdom) David Rice (United Kingdom) Sean Thornley
USA F24 Futures $10,000	September 28	Laguna Niguel, California; USA	Hard	(United States) Ryan Harrison	(United States) Ryan Harrison (New Zealand) Michael Venus
Mexico F10 Futures $10,000	September 28	Zacatecas; Mexico	Hard	(Mexico) Miguel Gallardo Valles	(United States) Todd Paul (United States) Cory Parr
Kenya F1 Futures $10,000	September 28	Nairobi; Kenya	Clay	(Belgium) Alexandre Folie	(United Kingdom) James Feaver (Romania) Bogdan Leonte
Brazil F21 Futures $10,000	September 28	Itu; Brazil	Clay	(Argentina) Juan-Pablo Amado	(Brazil) Rafael Camilo (Brazil) Fabrício Neis
Argentina F17 Futures $10,000	September 28	Santiago del Estero; Argentina	Clay	(Argentina) Agustin Picco	(Argentina) Rodrigo Albano (Argentina) Patricio Heras
India F10 Futures $15,000	September 28	Kolkata; India	Hard	(India) Yuki Bhambri	(India) Rohan Gajjar (India) Purav Raja
Mexico F10A Futures $15,000	September 29			(Poland) Marcin Gawron	(Poland) Marcin Gawron (Poland) Mateusz Kowalczyk

=== October ===
Tournament	Date	City	Surface	Singles champions	Doubles champions
India F11 Futures $15,000	October 5	Pune; India	Hard	(New Zealand) Daniel King-Turner	(India) Divij Sharan (India) Vishnu Vardhan
Greece F3 Futures $10,000	October 5	Paros; Greece	Carpet	(Croatia) Petar Jelenić	(Switzerland) Mathieu Guenat (Republic of Ireland) Colin O'Brien
France F17 Futures $15,000	October 5	Nevers; France	Hard (i)	(France) David Guez	(United States) Colt Gaston (United States) Phillip Simmonds
Germany F19 Futures $10,000	October 5	Leimen; Germany	Hard (i)	(Poland) Michał Przysiężny	(United Kingdom) Dominic Inglot (United Kingdom) Max Jones
Spain F34 Futures $15,000	October 5	Córdoba; Spain	Hard	(Spain) Adrián Menéndez Maceiras	(Spain) Agustin Boje-Ordonez (Spain) Pablo Martin-Adalia
Brazil F22 Futures $10,000	October 5	Bauru; Brazil	Clay	(Brazil) Rafael Camilo	(Ecuador) Emilio Gómez (Ecuador) Roberto Quiroz
Italy F31 Futures $10,000	October 5	Naples; Italy	Hard	(Italy) Stefano Ianni	(Italy) Stefano Ianni (Italy) Matteo Volante
Mexico F11 Futures $10,000	October 5	Monterrey; Mexico	Hard	(United States) Todd Paul	(United States) Brett Joelson (United States) Ashwin Kumar
Chile F1 Futures $10,000	October 5	Antofagasta; Chile	Clay	(Chile) Jorge Aguilar	(Chile) Guillermo Rivera Aránguiz (Chile) Cristóbal Saavedra Corvalán
Argentina F18 Futures $10,000	October 5	La Rioja; Argentina	Clay	(Argentina) Diego Cristin	(Argentina) Diego Cristin (Argentina) Alejandro Fabbri
Australia F7 Futures $15,000	October 5	Happy Valley; Australia	Hard	(United Kingdom) Jamie Baker	(Australia) Adam Hubble (Australia) Kaden Hensel
Kazakhstan F5 Futures $10,000	October 5	Astana; Kazakhstan	Hard (i)	(Russia) Andrey Kuznetsov	(Ukraine) Ivan Anikanov (Russia) Andrey Kumantsov
Thailand F4 Futures $10,000	October 5	Bangkok; Thailand	Hard	(New Zealand) Rubin Statham	(Czech Republic) Roman Jebavý (New Zealand) Rubin Statham
Venezuela F7 Futures $10,000	October 5	Barquisimeto; Venezuela	Clay	(Venezuela) José de Armas	(Peru) Francisco Carbajal (Colombia) Eduardo Struvay
Venezuela F8 Futures $10,000	October 12	Caracas; Venezuela	Hard	(Venezuela) Piero Luisi	(Venezuela) Piero Luisi (Venezuela) Román Recarte
Greece F4 Futures $10,000	October 12	Heraklio; Greece	Carpet	(Switzerland) Alexander Sadecky	(Switzerland) Alexander Sadecky (Russia) Mikhail Vasiliev
USA F25 Futures $15,000	October 12	Austin, Texas; USA	Hard	(United States) Michael McClune	(United States) Conor Pollock (United States) Cory Parr
Thailand F5 Futures $10,000	October 12	Nakhon Ratchasima; Thailand	Hard	(Hungary) Ádám Kellner	(Finland) Harri Heliövaara (Czech Republic) Roman Jebavý
Australia F8 Futures $15,000	October 12	Port Pirie; Australia	Hard	(Australia) Matthew Ebden	(Australia) Matthew Ebden (Australia) Sadik Kadir
Japan F8 Futures $15,000	October 12	Kashiwa; Japan	Hard	(Japan) Junn Mitsuhashi	(Japan) Junn Mitsuhashi (Chinese Taipei) Yi Chu-huan
Nigeria F1 Futures $15,000	October 12	Lagos; Nigeria	Hard	(Morocco) Reda El Amrani	(Morocco) Reda El Amrani (Morocco) Anas Fattar
Egypt F14 Futures $15,000	October 12	Cairo; Egypt	Clay	(Germany) Gero Kretschmer	(Slovakia) Andrej Martin (Czech Republic) Jaroslav Pospíšil
Chile F2 Futures $10,000	October 12	Santiago; Chile	Clay	(Italy) Antonio Comporto	(Chile) Guillermo Rivera Aránguiz (Chile) Cristóbal Saavedra Corvalán
Argentina F19 Futures $10,000	October 12	San Juan; Argentina	Clay	(Argentina) Alejandro Fabbri	(Argentina) Diego Cristin (Argentina) Alejandro Fabbri
Brazil F23 Futures $10,000	October 12	Belo Horizonte; Brazil	Hard	(Argentina) Juan-Pablo Amado	(Brazil) Rafael Camilo (Brazil) Rodrigo Guidolin
France F18 Futures $15,000	October 12	Saint-Dizier; France	Hard (i)	(France) Antony Dupuis	(France) Grégoire Burquier (France) Baptiste Bayet
Germany F20 Futures $10,000	October 12	Isernhagen; Germany	Hard (i)	(Finland) Juho Paukku	(Slovakia) Matus Horecny (Slovakia) Michal Pazicky
Croatia F9 Futures $15,000	October 12	Dubrovnik; Croatia	Clay	(United Kingdom) Aljaž Bedene	(Slovenia) Martin Rmus (Slovenia) Blaž Rola
Belarus F1 Futures $15,000	October 12	Minsk; Belarus	Carpet (i)	(Poland) Michał Przysiężny	(Belarus) Sergey Betov (Belarus) Nikolai Fidirko
Italy F32 Futures $10,000	October 12	Frascati; Italy	Clay	(Montenegro) Goran Tošić	(Croatia) Mislav Hizak (Montenegro) Goran Tošić
Turkey F10 Futures $10,000	October 19	Adana; Turkey	Hard	(Greece) Theodoros Angelinos	(Croatia) Marin Bradarić (Croatia) Petar Jelenić
Great Britain F15 Futures $15,000	October 19	Glasgow; Great Britain	Hard (i)	(Belgium) Yannick Mertens	(United Kingdom) Chris Eaton (United Kingdom) Dominic Inglot
Brazil F24 Futures $10,000	October 19	São Leopoldo; Brazil	Clay	(Brazil) Alexandre Bonatto	(Portugal) Goncalo Falcao (Brazil) Diego Matos
France F19 Futures $15,000	October 19	La Roche-sur-Yon; France	Hard (i)	(Belgium) Niels Desein	(Canada) Pierre-Ludovic Duclos (Belgium) Niels Desein
Spain F35 Futures $15,000	October 19	Sabadell; Spain	Clay	(Spain) Sergio Gutiérrez Ferrol	(Spain) Miguel Ángel López Jaén (Spain) Carlos Rexach-Itoiz
Croatia F10 Futures $15,000	October 19	Dubrovnik; Croatia	Clay	(Spain) Pedro Clar	(Croatia) Marin Draganja (Croatia) Dino Marcan
Belarus F2 Futures $15,000	October 19	Minsk 2 Belarus	Hard (i)	(Poland) Michał Przysiężny	(Belarus) Sergey Betov (Belarus) Nikolai Fidirko
Argentina F20 Futures $10,000	October 19	Rosario; Argentina	Clay	(Argentina) Pablo Galdón	(Argentina) Federico Cavallero (Argentina) Pablo Galdón
Chile F3 Futures $10,000	October 19	Santiago; Chile	Clay	(Peru) Iván Miranda	(Chile) Rodrigo Pérez (Chile) Guillermo Rivera Aránguiz
Egypt F15 Futures $15,000	October 19	Cairo; Egypt	Clay	(Egypt) Karim Maamoun	(Spain) Óscar Burrieza (Spain) Javier Martí
Nigeria F2 Futures $15,000	October 19	Lagos; Nigeria	Hard	(Morocco) Reda El Amrani	(United States) John Paul Fruttero (Romania) Cătălin-Ionuț Gârd
South Africa F1 Futures $15,000	October 19	Pretoria; South Africa	Hard	(South Africa) Andrew Anderson	(South Africa) Andrew Anderson (South Africa) Benjamin Janse van Rensburg
Japan F9 Futures $15,000	October 19	Yokohama; Japan	Clay	(Japan) Yūichi Sugita	(Japan) Hiromasa Oku (Japan) Kousuke Sugimoto
Thailand F6 Futures $10,000	October 19	Nonthaburi; Thailand	Hard	(New Zealand) Daniel King-Turner	(Thailand) Kirati Siributwong (Thailand) Peerakit Siributwong
USA F26 Futures $15,000	October 19	Mansfield, Texas; USA	Hard	(Spain) Arnau Brugués Davi	(Canada) Philip Bester (France) Jonathan Eysseric
Venezuela F9 Futures $10,000	October 19	Caracas; Venezuela	Hard	(Venezuela) David Souto	(Venezuela) Luis David Martínez (Venezuela) Yohny Romero
Senegal F1 Futures $15,000	October 26	Dakar; Senegal	Hard	(Belgium) Niels Desein	(Nigeria) Clifford Enosoregbe (Uganda) Duncan Mugabe
South Africa F2 Futures $15,000	October 26	Pretoria; South Africa	Hard	(South Africa) Jean Andersen	(Slovakia) Ivo Klec (Austria) Richard Ruckelshausen
Vietnam F1 Futures $10,000	October 26	Bình Dương; Vietnam	Hard	(New Zealand) Rubin Statham	(Thailand) Kirati Siributwong (New Zealand) Rubin Statham
Chile F4 Futures $10,000	October 26	Santiago; Chile	Clay	(Chile) Jorge Aguilar	(Chile) Jorge Aguilar (Argentina) Diego Cristin
Argentina F21 Futures $10,000	October 26	Buenos Aires; Argentina	Clay	(Argentina) Lionel Noviski	(Argentina) Federico Cavallero (Argentina) Marcos Conocente
Mexico F12 Futures $10,000	October 26	Obregón; Mexico	Hard	(Canada) Vasek Pospisil	(Canada) Vasek Pospisil (Australia) Nima Roshan
Brazil F25 Futures $10,000	October 26	Porto Alegre; Brazil	Clay	(Croatia) Franko Škugor	(Brazil) Diego Matos (Croatia) Franko Škugor
France F20 Futures $10,000	October 26	Rodez; France	Hard (i)	(Morocco) Rabie Chaki	(France) Jeremy Blandin (France) Vincent Stouff
Spain F36 Futures $10,000	October 26	Sant Cugat; Spain	Clay	(Spain) Marc Fornell Mestres	(Spain) Miguel Ángel López Jaén (Spain) Gabriel Trujillo Soler
Turkey F11 Futures $10,000	October 26	Antalya; Turkey	Clay	(Netherlands) Jesse Huta Galung	(Romania) Llaurentiu-Ady Gavrila (Romania) Andrei Mlendea
Great Britain F16 Futures $15,000	October 26	Cardiff; Great Britain	Hard (i)	(Finland) Henri Kontinen	(Republic of Ireland) Barry King (Republic of Ireland) James McGee

=== November ===
Tournament	Date	City	Surface	Singles champions	Doubles champions
Spain F37 Futures $10,000	November 2	Vilafranca; Spain	Clay	(Spain) Pedro Clar	(Spain) Ignacio Coll Riudavets (Spain) Gerard Granollers
Turkey F12 Futures $10,000	November 2	Antalya; Turkey	Clay	(Netherlands) Jesse Huta Galung	(Bulgaria) Tihomir Grozdanov (Bulgaria) Dinko Halachev
Brazil F26 Futures $10,000	November 2	Porto Alegre; Brazil	Clay	(Argentina) Juan-Pablo Amado	(Brazil) Rodrigo Guidolin (Brazil) Fabrício Neis
Mexico F14 Futures $10,000	November 2	Guadalajara; Mexico	Clay	(Canada) Vasek Pospisil	(Mexico) Bruno Echagaray (Mexico) Miguel Gallardo Valles
Argentina F22 Futures $10,000	November 2	Bahía Blanca; Argentina	Clay	(Argentina) Marco Trungelliti	(Argentina) Alejandro Fabbri (Argentina) Jonathan Gonzalia
Chile F5 Futures $10,000	November 2	Santiago; Chile	Clay	(Chile) Jorge Aguilar	(Bolivia) Mauricio Doria-Medina (Bolivia) Federico Zeballos
Senegal F2 Futures $15,000	November 2	Dakar; Senegal	Hard	(Belgium) Niels Desein	(Belgium) Niels Desein (United States) John Paul Fruttero
USA F27 Futures $10,000	November 2	Birmingham, Alabama; USA	Clay	(Australia) James Lemke	(Armenia) Tigran Martirosyan (New Zealand) Artem Sitak
USA F28 Futures $10,000	November 9	Niceville, Florida; USA	Clay	(Republic of Ireland) Conor Niland	(Armenia) Tigran Martirosyan (New Zealand) Artem Sitak
Chile F6 Futures $10,000	November 9	Concepción; Chile	Clay	(Chile) Adrián García	(Bolivia) Mauricio Doria-Medina (Bolivia) Federico Zeballos
Iran F7 Futures $15,000	November 9	Kish Island; Iran	Clay	(Hungary) Attila Balázs	(Poland) Marcin Gawron (Poland) Grzegorz Panfil
Mexico F15 Futures $10,000	November 9	Puerto Vallarta; Mexico	Hard	(El Salvador) Marcelo Arévalo	(Mexico) Javier Herrera-Eguiluz (Mexico) César Ramírez
Argentina F23 Futures $10,000	November 9	Neuquén; Argentina	Clay	(Argentina) Juan-Manuel Valverde	(Argentina) Alejandro Kon (Argentina) Juan-Manuel Valverde
Turkey F13 Futures $10,000	November 9	Antalya; Turkey	Clay	(United Kingdom) Aljaž Bedene	(Serbia) Ivan Bjelica (Serbia) Aleksander Slovic
Czech Rep. F4 Futures $15,000	November 16	Rožnov pod Radhoštěm; Czech Republic	Carpet (i)	(Czech Republic) Jan Mertl	(Russia) Denis Matsukevich (Poland) Dawid Olejniczak
Iran F8 Futures $15,000	November 16	Kish Island; Iran	Clay	(Hungary) Attila Balázs	(Russia) Andrey Kumantsov (Serbia) David Savić
Malaysia F4 Futures $10,000	November 16	Kuala Lumpur; Malaysia	Hard	(South Korea) Cho Soong-jae	(Belarus) Sergey Betov (Belarus) Dzmitry Zhyrmont
Australia F9 Futures $15,000	November 16	Esperance; Australia	Hard	(Australia) Matthew Ebden	(Australia) Colin Ebelthite (Australia) Matthew Ebden
El Salvador F2 Futures $15,000	November 16	Santa Tecla; El Salvador	Clay	(El Salvador) Marcelo Arévalo	(El Salvador) Rafael Arévalo (El Salvador) Marcelo Arévalo
USA F29 Futures $10,000	November 16	Amelia Island, Florida; USA	Clay	(United States) Jack Sock	(United States) Adam El Mihdawy (United States) Denis Zivkovic
Argentina F24 Futures $10,000	November 16	Resistencia; Argentina	Clay	(Argentina) Facundo Bagnis	(Argentina) Alejandro Kon (Argentina) Juan-Manuel Valverde
Argentina F25 Futures $10,000	November 23	Corrientes; Argentina	Clay	(Argentina) Guido Pella	(Argentina) Andrés Molteni (Argentina) Guido Pella
Dominican Republic F1 Futures $10,000	November 23	Santo Domingo; Dominican Republic	Hard	(Dominican Republic) Víctor Estrella Burgos	(United States) Adam El Mihdawy (Austria) Nikolaus Moser
Australia F10 Futures $15,000	November 23	Kalgoorlie; Australia	Hard	(Australia) John Millman	(United Kingdom) Brydan Klein (Australia) Robert Smeets
Malaysia F5 Futures $10,000	November 23	Kuala Lumpur; Malaysia	Hard	(Thailand) Kittipong Wachiramanowong	(Belarus) Sergey Betov (Belarus) Dzmitry Zhyrmont
Peru F1 Futures $10,000	November 23	Lima; Peru	Clay	(Argentina) Leandro Migani	(Argentina) Diego Cristin (Chile) Guillermo Rivera Aránguiz
Brazil F29 Futures $10,000	November 23	Fernandópolis; Brazil	Clay	(Greece) Theodoros Angelinos	(Brazil) Rodrigo-Antonio Grilli (Brazil) Carlos Oliveira
Czech Rep. F5 Futures $15,000	November 23	Opava; Czech Republic	Carpet (i)	(Czech Republic) Pavel Šnobel	(Czech Republic) Roman Jebavý (Slovakia) Andrej Martin
Brazil F30 Futures $10,000	November 30	Foz do Iguaçu; Brazil	Clay	(Brazil) Alexandre Bonatto	(Brazil) Alexandre Bonatto (Brazil) Rodrigo Guidolin
Peru F2 Futures $10,000	November 30	Arequipa; Peru	Clay	(Germany) Andre Begemann	(Bolivia) Mauricio Doria-Medina (Bolivia) Federico Zeballos
Malaysia F6 Futures $10,000	November 30	Kuala Lumpur; Malaysia	Hard	(Netherlands) Jesse Huta Galung	(Netherlands) Jesse Huta Galung (Netherlands) Miliaan Niesten
Australia F11 Futures $15,000	November 30	Bendigo; Australia	Hard	(Australia) Matthew Ebden	(Australia) Dane Propoggia (Australia) Matt Reid
Dominican Republic F2 Futures $10,000	November 30	Santo Domingo; Dominican Republic	Hard	(Dominican Republic) Víctor Estrella Burgos	(United States) Adam El Mihdawy (United States) Blake Strode

=== December ===
Tournament	Date	City	Surface	Singles champions	Doubles champions
Dominican Republic F3 Futures $10,000	December 7	Santo Domingo; Dominican Republic	Hard	(Romania) Cătălin-Ionuț Gârd	(Austria) Maximilian Neuchrist (Austria) Tristan-Samuel Weissborn
Peru F3 Futures $10,000	December 7	Lima; Peru	Clay	(Argentina) Leandro Migani	(Peru) Sergio Galdós (Argentina) Leandro Migani
Brazil F31 Futures $10,000	December 7	Araçatuba; Brazil	Clay	(Brazil) Danilo Ferraz	(Brazil) André Miele (Brazil) Diego Matos
Brazil F32 Futures $15,000	December 21	Sorocaba; Brazil	Clay	(Brazil) Caio Zampieri	(Brazil) Alexandre Bonatto (Brazil) Rodrigo-Antonio Grilli
Brazil F34 Futures $15,000	December 28	São Paulo; Brazil	Hard	(Spain) Guillermo Alcaide	(Argentina) Juan-Pablo Amado (Brazil) Rodrigo-Antonio Grilli
