= 2010 TEAN International – Men's doubles =

Men's doubles
- 2010 TEAN International

Final
- Champions: (Uzbekistan) Farrukh Dustov (Austria) Bertram Steinberger
- Runners-up: (Netherlands) Roy Bruggeling (Netherlands) Bas van der Valk
- Score: 6–4, 6–1

Events
Singles	men	women
Doubles	men	women
- TEAN International

Jonathan Marray and Jamie Murray were the defending champions, but Marray chose not to participate.
Jamie Murray partnered with Jeff Coetzee. However, they lost to Rameez Junaid and Niko Karagiannis in the first round.
Farrukh Dustov and Bertram Steinberger defeated Roy Bruggeling and Bas van der Valk 6–4, 6–1 in the finals.

== Seeds ==
1. (South Africa) Jeff Coetzee / (United Kingdom) Jamie Murray (first round)
2. (Germany) Andreas Beck / (Germany) Philipp Marx (first round)
3. (Netherlands) Antal van der Duim / (Netherlands) Boy Westerhof (quarterfinals)
4. (Italy) Andrea Arnaboldi / (Italy) Thomas Fabbiano (quarterfinals)

== Main draw ==
Key

- Q = Qualifier
- WC = Wild card
- LL = Lucky loser
- Alt = Alternate
- ITF = ITF entry
- PR = Protected ranking
- SR = Special ranking
- SE = Special exempt
- JE = Junior exempt
- JR = Junior Accelerator Programme entrant
- CO = College Accelerator Programme entrant
- NG = Next Gen Accelerator Program entrant
- w/o = Walkover
- r = Retired
- d = Defaulted

=== Draw ===
First round
1	(South Africa) J Coetzee (United Kingdom) J Murray	6^{5}	4
(Australia) R Junaid (Greece) N Karagiannis	7	6
(France) J Eysseric (Belgium) D Goffin	3	2
(Sweden) D Berta (United Kingdom) D Smethurst	6	6
4	(Italy) A Arnaboldi (Italy) T Fabbiano	7	3	[10]
(Germany) B Knittel (Australia) C Thomson	5	6	[6]
(Uzbekistan) F Dustov (Austria) B Steinberger	6	6
(Germany) Dennis Blömke (Australia) J Lemke	3	0
(Russia) V Rudnev (Ukraine) I Sergeyev	6	1	[4]
(Netherlands Antilles) A Blom (Netherlands) W Koolhof	4	6	[10]
WC	(Netherlands) Yannick Ebbinghaus (Netherlands) Jasper van der Zwan	3	2
3	(Netherlands) A van der Duim (Netherlands) B Westerhof	6	6
(Netherlands) Roy Bruggeling (Netherlands) B van der Valk	6	6
(Finland) T Nieminen (Finland) J Paukku	3	4
(Netherlands) Bart Brons (Netherlands) Tim van Terheijden	4	6	[10]
2	(Germany) A Beck (Germany) P Marx	6	3	[6]

Quarterfinals
(Australia) R Junaid (Greece) N Karagiannis
(Sweden) D Berta (United Kingdom) D Smethurst	w/o
4	(Italy) A Arnaboldi (Italy) T Fabbiano	2	4
(Uzbekistan) F Dustov (Austria) B Steinberger	6	6
(Netherlands Antilles) A Blom (Netherlands) W Koolhof	6	7
3	(Netherlands) A van der Duim (Netherlands) B Westerhof	4	6^{7}
(Netherlands) R Bruggeling (Netherlands) B van der Valk	7	6
(Netherlands) B Brons (Netherlands) T van Terheijden	5	3

Semifinals
(Australia) R Junaid (Greece) N Karagiannis	6^{4}	5
(Uzbekistan) F Dustov (Austria) B Steinberger	7	7
(Netherlands Antilles) A Blom (Netherlands) W Koolhof	6^{3}	3
(Netherlands) R Bruggeling (Netherlands) B van der Valk	7	6

Finals
(Uzbekistan) F Dustov (Austria) B Steinberger	6	6
(Netherlands) R Bruggeling (Netherlands) B van der Valk	1	4
