= 2010 TEAN International =

- Date: September 7 – 12
- Edition: 15th
- Location: Alphen aan den Rijn, Netherlands

Champions

Men's singles
- (Netherlands) Jesse Huta Galung

Women's singles
- (Germany) Julia Schruff

Men's doubles
- (Uzbekistan) Farrukh Dustov / (Austria) Bertram Steinberger

Women's doubles
- (Netherlands) Daniëlle Harmsen / (Netherlands) Bibiane Schoofs
← 2009 ·	TEAN International	· 2011 →

The 2010 TEAN International was a professional tennis tournament played on clay courts. It was the 15th edition of the tournament which was part of the 2010 ATP Challenger Tour. It took place in Alphen aan den Rijn, Netherlands between 7 and 12 September.

== ATP entrants ==
=== Seeds ===
Nationality	Player	Ranking*	Seeding
NED	Robin Haase	83	1
GER	Simon Greul	84	2
GER	Andreas Beck	104	3
GER	~~Julian Reister~~	~~106~~	~~4~~
NED	Jesse Huta Galung	144	5
NED	Igor Sijsling	168	6
NED	Thomas Schoorel	175	7
BEL	Christophe Rochus	185	8
FRA	Olivier Patience	212	9

- Rankings are as of August 30, 2010.

=== Other entrants ===
The following players received wildcards into the singles main draw:

- (Netherlands) Bart Brons
- (Netherlands) Justin Eleveld
- (Netherlands) Robin Haase
- (Netherlands) Boy Westerhof

The following players received entry from the qualifying draw:

- (Sweden) Daniel Berta
- (France) Thomas Cazes-Carrère
- (France) Gianni Mina
- (Germany) Jan-Lennard Struff

The following players received a lucky loser entry:

- (Uzbekistan) Farrukh Dustov

== Champions ==
=== Men's singles ===
(Netherlands) Jesse Huta Galung def. (Netherlands) Thomas Schoorel, 6–7(4), 6–4, 6–4

=== Women's singles ===
(Germany) Julia Schruff def. (France) Irena Pavlovic 6–0, 6–3

=== Men's doubles ===
(Uzbekistan) Farrukh Dustov / (Austria) Bertram Steinberger def. (Netherlands) Roy Bruggeling / (Netherlands) Bas van der Valk, 6–4, 6–1

=== Women's doubles ===
(Netherlands) Daniëlle Harmsen / (Netherlands) Bibiane Schoofs def. (Russia) Ksenia Lykina / (France) Irena Pavlovic, 6–3, 6–2
