= 2010 TEAN International – Men's singles =

Men's singles
- 2010 TEAN International

Final
- Champions: (Netherlands) Jesse Huta Galung
- Runners-up: (Netherlands) Thomas Schoorel
- Score: 6–7^{(4–7)}, 6–4, 6–4

Events
Singles	men	women
Doubles	men	women
- TEAN International

Stéphane Robert was the defending champion, but decided not to compete this year.
Jesse Huta Galung won in the final 6–7^{(4–7)}, 6–4, 6–4, against his compatriot, Thomas Schoorel.

== Seeds ==
1. (Netherlands) Robin Haase (first round)
2. (Germany) Simon Greul (quarterfinals)
3. (Germany) Andreas Beck (quarterfinals)
4. (Germany) Julian Reister (withdrew due to fever)
5. (Netherlands) Jesse Huta Galung (champion)
6. (Netherlands) Igor Sijsling (second round)
7. (Netherlands) Thomas Schoorel (final)
8. (Belgium) Christophe Rochus (quarterfinals)
9. (France) Olivier Patience (quarterfinals)

== Draw ==
Key

- Q = Qualifier
- WC = Wild card
- LL = Lucky loser
- Alt = Alternate
- ITF = ITF entry
- PR = Protected ranking
- SR = Special ranking
- SE = Special exempt
- JE = Junior exempt
- JR = Junior Accelerator Programme entrant
- CO = College Accelerator Programme entrant
- NG = Next Gen Accelerator Program entrant
- w/o = Walkover
- r = Retired
- d = Defaulted

=== Finals ===
Semifinals
Q	(Germany) Jan-Lennard Struff	2	4
7	(Netherlands) Thomas Schoorel	6	6
5	(Netherlands) Jesse Huta Galung	3	6	6
(Germany) Bastian Knittel	6	2	3

Final
7	(Netherlands) Thomas Schoorel	7	4	4
5	(Netherlands) Jesse Huta Galung	6^{4}	6	6

=== Top half ===
First round
1	(Netherlands) R Haase	3	3
(Italy) A Arnaboldi	6	6
Q	(Germany) J-L Struff	6	6
WC	(Netherlands) J Eleveld	3	2
LL	(Uzbekistan) F Dustov	2	4
(Ukraine) I Sergeyev	6	6
(Australia) J Lemke	1	0
8	(Belgium) C Rochus	6	6
9	(France) O Patience	6	6
(Belgium) K Vliegen	2	3
(Finland) T Nieminen	3	6	6
(Italy) T Fabbiano	6	0	4
(Belgium) D Goffin	2	3
(Germany) D Blömke	6	6
Q	(France) G Mina	4	4
7	(Netherlands) T Schoorel	6	6

Second round
(Italy) A Arnaboldi	3	6	6^{3}
Q	(Germany) J-L Struff	6	4	7
(Ukraine) I Sergeyev	3	r
8	(Belgium) C Rochus	6
9	(France) O Patience	6	6
(Finland) T Nieminen	1	4
(Germany) D Blömke	6	4	1
7	(Netherlands) T Schoorel	4	6	6

Quarterfinals
Q	(Germany) J-L Struff	6	6^{3}	6
8	(Belgium) C Rochus	3	7	2
9	(France) O Patience	6^{3}	3
7	(Netherlands) T Schoorel	7	6

Semifinals
Q	(Germany) J-L Struff	2	4
7	(Netherlands) T Schoorel	6	6

=== Bottom half ===
First round
5	(Netherlands) J Huta Galung	7	4	6
WC	(Netherlands) B Westerhof	6^{8}	6	3
(Australia) R Junaid	7	2	6
(Netherlands) M Middelkoop	6^{7}	6	4
(France) A Gensse	6	4
(Germany) A Flock	2	1	r
(United Kingdom) D Smethurst	6^{5}	1
3	(Germany) A Beck	7	6
6	(Netherlands) I Sijsling	3	7	6
(France) J Eysseric	6	6^{4}	1
(Slovenia) J Semrajc	6	2	4
(Germany) B Knittel	4	6	6
Q	(Sweden) D Berta	6	7
Q	(France) T Cazes-Carrère	3	5
WC	(Netherlands) B Brons	1	3
2	(Germany) S Greul	6	6

Second round
5	(Netherlands) J Huta Galung	7	6
(Australia) R Junaid	6^{5}	3
(France) A Gensse	6	4	3
3	(Germany) A Beck	3	6	6
6	(Netherlands) I Sijsling	6	6^{8}	1
(Germany) B Knittel	2	7	6
Q	(Sweden) D Berta	3	1
2	(Germany) S Greul	6	6

Quarterfinals
5	(Netherlands) J Huta Galung	6	6
3	(Germany) A Beck	4	4
(Germany) B Knittel	6	7
2	(Germany) S Greul	3	5

Semifinals
5	(Netherlands) J Huta Galung	3	6	6
(Germany) B Knittel	6	2	3
