= Steven Korteling =

Dutch former professional tennis player

- Country (sports): Netherlands
- Born: 16 January 1984 (age 42)
- Prize money: $28,831

Singles
- Career record: 0–1 (ATP Tour)
- Highest ranking: No. 423 (28 Nov 2005)

Doubles
- Career record: 0–1 (ATP Tour)
- Highest ranking: No. 456 (1 May 2006)

Steven Korteling (born 16 January 1984) is a Dutch former professional tennis player.

Korteling, the 2004 Dutch national champion, reached a career high singles ranking of 423 in the world. In 2005, he made his ATP Tour main debut in the Dutch Open, losing in the first round to sixth seed, Victor Hănescu. As a doubles player, he was featured in the main draw at Rotterdam in 2006, and won three ITF Futures titles.

== ITF Futures titles ==
=== Doubles: (3) ===
No.	Date	Tournament	Surface	Partner	Opponents	Score
1.	Nov 2003	Netherlands Antillies F1, Curaçao	Hard	(Netherlands) Michel Koning	(Italy) Alessandro Motti (France) Stéphane Robert	6–3, 3–6, 6–1
2.	Jul 2004	Germany F11, Trier	Clay	(Netherlands) Michel Koning	(Chile) Felipe Parada (Argentina) Esteban Zanetti	6–1, 7–5
3.	Apr 2005	Italy F10, Padua	Clay	(Italy) Alberto Brizzi	(Italy) Massimo Ocera (Italy) Marco Pedrini	4–6, 6–1, 6–3
