= 2002 US Open (tennis) =

- Date: August 26 – September 8
- Edition: 122nd
- Category: Grand Slam (ITF)
- Surface: Hardcourt
- Location: New York City, U.S.
- Venue: USTA Billie Jean King National Tennis Center

Champions

Men's singles
- (United States) Pete Sampras

Women's singles
- (United States) Serena Williams

Men's doubles
- (India) Mahesh Bhupathi / (Belarus) Max Mirnyi

Women's doubles
- (Spain) Virginia Ruano Pascual / (Argentina) Paola Suárez

Mixed doubles
- (United States) Mike Bryan / (United States) Lisa Raymond

Boys' singles
- (France) Richard Gasquet

Girls' singles
- (Russia) Maria Kirilenko

Boys' doubles
- (Netherlands) Michel Koning / (Netherlands) Bas van der Valk

Girls' doubles
- (Belgium) Elke Clijsters / (Belgium) Kirsten Flipkens
← 2001 ·	US Open	· 2003 →

The 2002 US Open was held between August 26 and September 8, 2002.

Both Lleyton Hewitt and Venus Williams were unsuccessful in their title defenses, Hewitt being defeated in the semifinals by Andre Agassi and Venus being defeated in the final by her younger sister Serena. It was the third of four consecutive Grand Slam titles won by Serena, all won by defeating Venus in the final. Pete Sampras, runner-up in 2001, won his fifth US Open title, and his 14th and final Grand Slam title, defeating his rival Agassi in the final in four sets.

== Seniors ==
=== Men's singles ===
(United States) Pete Sampras defeated (United States) Andre Agassi, 6–3, 6–4, 5–7, 6–4

- It was Sampras's 14th (and last) career Grand Slam title, and his 5th US Open title.

=== Women's singles ===
(United States) Serena Williams defeated (United States) Venus Williams, 6–4, 6–3

- It was Serena's 4th career Grand Slam title, and her 2nd US Open title.

=== Men's doubles ===
(India) Mahesh Bhupathi / (Belarus) Max Mirnyi defeated (Czech Republic) Jiří Novák / (Czech Republic) Radek Štěpánek, 6–3, 3–6, 6–4

=== Women's doubles ===
(Spain) Virginia Ruano Pascual / (Argentina) Paola Suárez defeated (Russia) Elena Dementieva / (Slovakia) Janette Husárová, 6–2, 6–1

=== Mixed doubles ===
(United States) Lisa Raymond / (United States) Mike Bryan defeated (Slovenia) Katarina Srebotnik / (United States) Bob Bryan, 7–6^{(11–9)}, 7–6^{(7–1)}

== Juniors ==
=== Boys' singles ===
(France) Richard Gasquet defeated (Cyprus) Marcos Baghdatis, 7–5, 6–2

=== Girls' singles ===
(Russia) Maria Kirilenko defeated (Czech Republic) Barbora Strýcová, 6–4, 6–4

=== Boys' doubles ===
(Netherlands) Michel Koning / (Netherlands) Bas van der Valk

=== Girls' doubles ===
(Belgium) Elke Clijsters / (Belgium) Kirsten Flipkens

== Notes ==
Preceded by 2002 Wimbledon Championships	Grand Slams	Succeeded by 2003 Australian Open
