= Michel Koning =

Dutch tennis player (born 1984)

- Country (sports): Netherlands
- Residence: Oosthuizen, Netherlands
- Born: 1 May 1984 (age 42) Purmerend, Netherlands
- Height: 1.91 m (6 ft 3 in)
- Turned pro: 2004
- Plays: Right-handed
- Prize money: $87,210

Singles
- Career record: 0–1
- Career titles: 0; 0 Challenger, 5 Futures
- Highest ranking: No. 229 (15 June 2009)

Grand Slam singles results
- Australian Open: Q1 (2009)
- French Open: Q2 (2009)
- Wimbledon: Q1 (2009)

Doubles
- Career record: 1–3
- Career titles: 0; 0 Challenger, 15 Futures
- Highest ranking: No. 320 (18 August 2008)
- Last updated on: 23 April 2021.

Michel Koning (born 1 May 1984) is a Dutch tennis player. He has a career-high ATP singles ranking of world No. 229 achieved on 15 June 2009, and a career-high ATP doubles ranking of world No. 320 achieved on 18 August 2008.

As a junior, Koning reached a career high singles ranking of world No. 14, which he achieved on 8 July 2002 and a career-high doubles ranking of world No. 2, achieved on 9 September 2002. He won the 2002 US Open boys' doubles title alongside compatriot Bas van der Valk where they defeated Brian Baker and Chris Guccione in straight sets 6–4, 6–4.

Koning made his ATP Tour debut at the 2002 Ordina Open where he was given a wild card entry into the doubles draw alongside Bas van der Valk. They pulled off an upset victory by defeating fourth seeds Michael Hill and Daniel Vacek in the first round 6–7^{(8–10)}, 6–2, 7–6^{(7–5)}. They were defeated in the second round by Andrei Olhovskiy and David Adams in straight sets 3–6, 5–7. In June 2007, Koning made his ATP Tour singles debut when he prevailed through the qualifying rounds to reach the main draw of the 2007 Ordina Open played on grass courts in 's-Hertogenbosch. In qualifying he defeated Franko Škugor 7–5, 6–4, Philipp Petzschner 4–6, 7–6^{(7–5)}, 7–6^{(7–4)} and Lukáš Dlouhý 6–4, 7–6^{(7–3)} to reach his first and what would become his only tour-level main draw. He would go on to lose in the first round to first seed Tommy Robredo in straight sets 4–6, 6–7^{(4–7)}.

Koning has reached 7 career singles finals, posting a tally of 5 wins and 2 losses, all coming on the ITF Futures Tour. Additionally, he has reached 19 career doubles finals with a record of 15 wins and 4 losses similarly all coming on the ITF Futures Tour.

== ATP Challenger and ITF Futures finals ==
=== Singles: 7 (5–2) ===
Legend ATP Challenger (0–0) ITF Futures (5–2)	Finals by surface Hard (1–1) Clay (0–1) Grass (2–0) Carpet (2–0)

Result	W–L	Date	Tournament	Tier	Surface	Opponent	Score
Win	1–0	Sep 2005	Spain F25, Madrid	Futures	Hard	(Spain) David Marrero	4–6, 6–3, 6–2
Loss	1–1	Dec 2006	Tunisia F6, Hammam Sousse	Futures	Hard	(Croatia) Franko Škugor	3–6, 1–6
Win	2–1	Jun 2008	Ireland F1, Dublin	Futures	Carpet	(Republic of Ireland) Colin O'Brien	6–3, 7–5
Win	3–1	Jul 2008	Great Britain F9, Felixstowe	Futures	Grass	(Australia) Brydan Klein	7–6^{(8–6)}, 7–6^{(7–4)}
Win	4–1	Jul 2008	Great Britain F10, Frinton-on-Sea	Futures	Grass	(Australia) Greg Jones	6–4, 6–3
Loss	4–2	Aug 2008	Netherlands F5, Vlaardingen	Futures	Clay	(Germany) Gero Kretschmer	4–6, 3–6
Win	5–2	Oct 2009	France F16, Sarreguemines	Futures	Carpet	(France) Ludovic Walter	7–6^{(7–5)}, 6–3

=== Doubles: 19 (15–4) ===
Legend ATP Challenger (0–0) ITF Futures (15–4)	Finals by surface Hard (7–1) Clay (5–2) Grass (0–0) Carpet (3–1)

Result	W–L	Date	Tournament	Tier	Surface	Partner	Opponents	Score
Loss	0–1	Aug 2001	Netherlands F1, Enschede	Futures	Clay	(Netherlands) Bart De Gier	(Belgium) Stefan Wauters (Belgium) Kristof Vliegen	6–7^{(4–7)}, 1–6
Win	1–1	Nov 2003	Netherlands Antillies F1, Curaçao	Futures	Hard	(Netherlands) Steven Korteling	(Italy) Alessandro Motti (France) Stéphane Robert	6–3, 3–6, 6–1
Win	2–1	Jul 2004	Netherlands F2, Heerhugowaard	Futures	Clay	(Netherlands) Bart De Gier	(Netherlands) Marc Ijzermann (Netherlands) Alexander Nonnekes	6–4, 7–5
Win	3–1	Jul 2004	Germany F11, Trier	Futures	Clay	(Netherlands) Steven Korteling	(Chile) Felipe Parada (Argentina) Esteban Zanetti	6–1, 7–5
Loss	3–2	Oct 2004	Belgium F1, Waterloo	Futures	Carpet	(Netherlands) Martijn van Haasteren	(Serbia and Montenegro) Darko Mađarovski (Slovakia) Igor Zelenay	4–6, 6–7^{(3–7)}
Win	4–2	Sep 2005	Spain F24, Madrid	Futures	Hard	(Netherlands) Jasper Smit	(Italy) Massimo Ocera (Italy) Marco Pedrini	3–6, 6–4, 6–3
Win	5–2	Sep 2005	Spain F25, Madrid	Futures	Hard	(Netherlands) Jasper Smit	(Denmark) Rasmus Nørby (United States) Joseph Schmulian	5–7, 6–2, 7–6^{(7–5)}
Win	6–2	Oct 2005	Spain F26, Martos	Futures	Hard	(Netherlands) Jasper Smit	(Spain) Óscar Burrieza López (Russia) Nikolai Nesterov	6–1, 7–5
Loss	6–3	Mar 2006	USA F6, McAllen	Futures	Hard	(Netherlands) Steven Korteling	(Canada) Pierre-Ludovic Duclos (South Africa) Wesley Whitehouse	3–6, 4–6
Win	7–3	Aug 2006	Netherlands F4, Vlaardingen	Futures	Clay	(Netherlands) Martijn van Haasteren	(Netherlands) Romano Frantzen (Netherlands) Matwé Middelkoop	7–5, 7–5
Loss	7–4	Sep 2006	Netherlands F5, Alphen aan den Rijn	Futures	Clay	(Netherlands) Nick van der Meer	(Serbia and Montenegro) Petar Popović (Austria) Daniel Köllerer	2–6, 3–6
Win	8–4	Sep 2006	Netherlands F6, Enschede	Futures	Clay	(Chile) Felipe Parada	(Netherlands) Romano Frantzen (Netherlands) Nick van der Meer	6–2, 6–4
Win	9–4	Nov 2006	Tunisia F5, Monastir	Futures	Hard	(Netherlands) Matwé Middelkoop	(Romania) Adrian Cruciat (Romania) Adrian Gavrilă	6–1, 6–1
Win	10–4	Sep 2007	Netherlands F5, Enschede	Futures	Clay	(Netherlands) Matwé Middelkoop	(United States) Chris Wettengel (France) Augustin Gensse	6–3, 6–2
Win	11–4	Jan 2008	Germany F1, Nussloch	Futures	Carpet	(Netherlands) Fred Hemmes	(Germany) Philipp Marx (Germany) Lars Uebel	7–6^{(9–7)}, 6–3
Win	12–4	Mar 2008	Portugal F4, Faro	Futures	Hard	(Netherlands) Fred Hemmes	(Ukraine) Sergey Bubka (Ukraine) Vladyslav Klymenko	6–3, 6–7^{(5–7)}, [10–8]
Win	13–4	Jun 2008	Ireland F2, Limerick	Futures	Carpet	(Denmark) Frederik Nielsen	(United States) Alberto Francis (United States) Nima Roshan	6–1, 7–6^{(9–7)}
Win	14–4	Mar 2009	France F5, Poitiers	Futures	Hard	(Australia) Robert Smeets	(Latvia) Deniss Pavlovs (Latvia) Andis Juška	6–7^{(4–7)}, 6–4, [10–8]
Win	15–4	Oct 2009	France F16, Sarreguemines	Futures	Carpet	(Netherlands Antilles) Martijn van Haasteren	(Serbia) Vladimir Obradović (Mexico) César Ramírez	6–3, 6–4

== Junior Grand Slam finals ==
=== Doubles: 1 (1 title) ===
Result	Year	Tournament	Surface	Partner	Opponents	Score
Win	2002	US Open	Hard	(Netherlands) Bas van der Valk	(United States) Brian Baker (Australia) Chris Guccione	6–4, 6–4
