= Bertram Steinberger =

Austrian tennis player

- Country (sports): Austria
- Born: 1 February 1986 (age 39) Austria
- Plays: Right-handed (two-handed backhand)
- Prize money: US$26,964

Singles
- Career record: 0–0
- Career titles: 0
- Highest ranking: No. 707 (18 February 2008)

Doubles
- Career record: 0–0
- Career titles: 0
- Highest ranking: No. 289 (25 July 2011)
- Last updated on: November 13, 2017.

Bertram Steinberger (born 1 February 1986) is an Austrian tennis player playing on the ATP Challenger Tour. On 18 February 2008, he reached his highest ATP singles ranking of world No. 707, whilst his highest doubles ranking of No. 289 was reached on 25 July 2011.

== Challenger finals ==
Legend
ATP Challenger Tour (1–0)

=== Doubles: 1 (1–0) ===
Outcome	No.	Date	Tournament	Surface	Partner	Opponents in the final	Score
Winners	1.	12 September 2010	Alphen aan den Rijn, Netherlands	Clay	(Uzbekistan) Farrukh Dustov	(Netherlands) Roy Bruggeling (Netherlands) Bas van der Valk	6–4, 6–1
