= Farrukh Dustov =

Uzbekistani tennis player (born 1986)

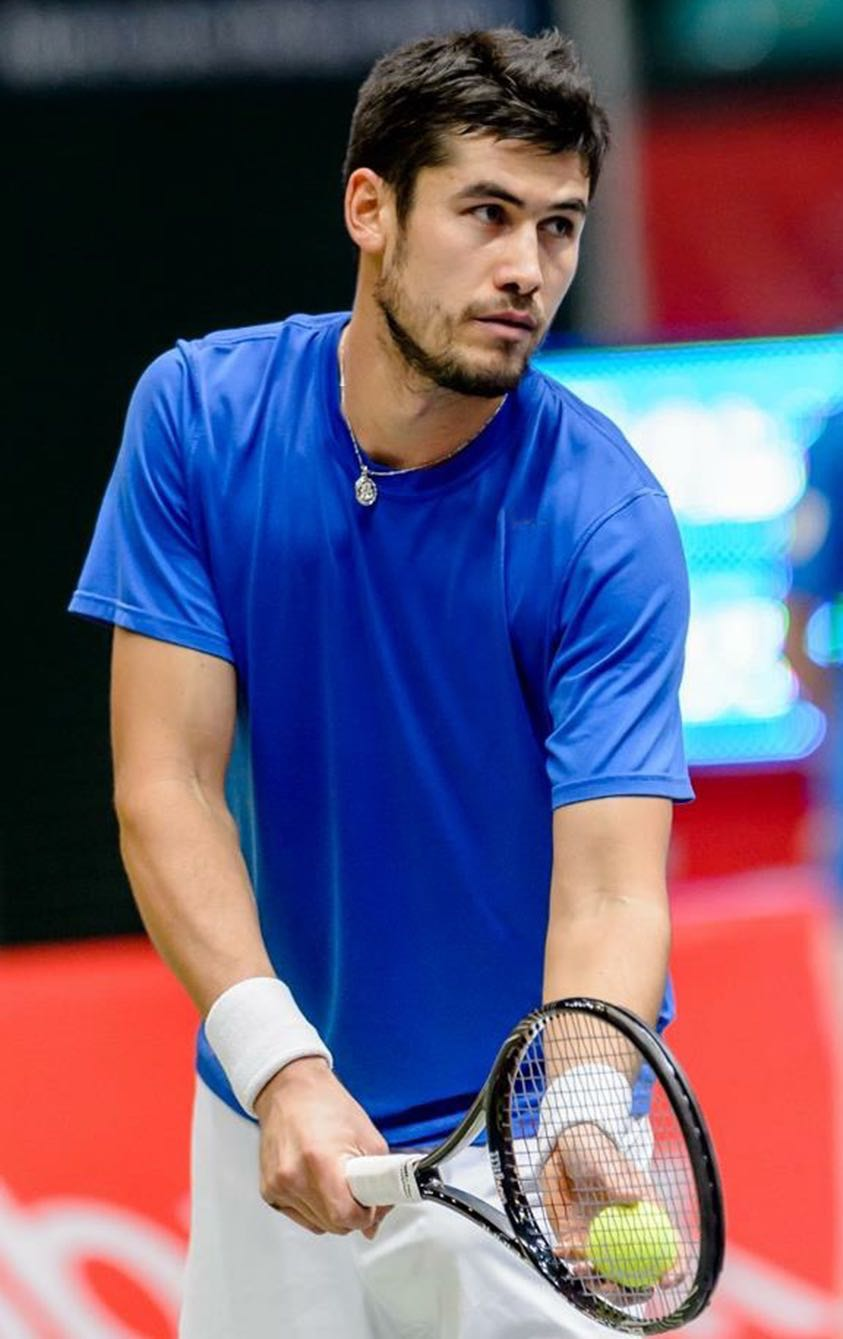
- Country (sports): Uzbekistan
- Residence: Tashkent, Uzbekistan
- Born: 22 May 1986 (age 39) Tashkent, Uzbek SSR
- Height: 1.93 m (6 ft 4 in)
- Turned pro: 2003
- Retired: 2018
- Plays: Right-handed
- Prize money: $511,680

Singles
- Career record: 11-26
- Career titles: 0
- Highest ranking: No. 98 (23 February 2015)

Grand Slam singles results
- Australian Open: Q2 (2012)
- French Open: Q3 (2013)
- Wimbledon: Q3 (2012)
- US Open: Q1 (2012, 2013, 2014, 2015)

Doubles
- Career record: 9-12
- Career titles: 0
- Highest ranking: No. 176 (24 February 2014)
Medal record
Representing Uzbekistan
Men's Tennis
Asian Games
Silver medal – second place	2010 Guangzhou	Team
Bronze medal – third place	2014 Incheon	Team
- Last updated on: 25 June 2022.

Farrukh Dustov (born 22 May 1986) is a retired Uzbek tennis player and tennis coach, playing on the ITF Futures Tour and ATP Challenger Tour. In February 2015, he reached his highest ATP singles ranking of world No. 98.

He was coached by Manuel Gasbarri, Boris Agostini, Petr Lebed and Diego Rosellini.

== ATP Challenger and ITF Futures finals ==
=== Singles: 22 (10–12) ===
Legend ATP Challenger (5–10) ITF Futures (5–2)	Finals by surface Hard (5–5) Clay (5–6) Grass (0–0) Carpet (0–1)

Result	W–L	Date	Tournament	Tier	Surface	Opponent	Score
Win	1–0	Jun 2004	Italy F11, San Floriano	Futures	Clay	(Algeria) Slimane Saoudi	3–6, 6–1, 6–1
Loss	1–1	Jun 2004	Italy F13, Cesena	Futures	Clay	(Italy) Matteo Colla	4–6, 4–6
Win	2–1	Jul 2004	Auastria F2, Kramsach	Futures	Clay	(Austria) Johannes Ager	1–6, 7–6^{(7–3)}, 6–1
Loss	2–2	Oct 2005	Italy F35, Lecce	Futures	Clay	(France) Éric Prodon	6–3, 4–6, 4–6
Win	3–2	Dec 2005	Tunisia F6, Menzah	Futures	Hard	(France) Frederic Jeanclaude	6–4, 6–1
Win	4–2	Jul 2006	Penza, Russia	Challenger	Hard	(Chinese Taipei) Ti Chen	5–7, 6–2, 6–4
Loss	4–3	Aug 2006	Saransk, Russia	Challenger	Clay	(Netherlands) Igor Sijsling	6–7^{(8–10)}, 4–6
Loss	4–4	Mar 2007	Ho Chi Minh City, Vietnam	Challenger	Hard	(Czech Republic) Pavel Šnobel	3–6, 6–7^{(3–7)}
Loss	4–5	Apr 2007	Saint Brieuc, France	Challenger	Clay	(Denmark) Kristian Pless	3–6, 1–6
Loss	4–6	Mar 2008	Wolfsburg, Germany	Challenger	Carpet	(Republic of Ireland) Louk Sorensen	6–7^{(7–9)}, 6–4, 4–6
Win	5–6	Jun 2009	Netherlands F3, Rotterdam	Futures	Clay	(Italy) Leonardo Azzaro	6–3, 6–4
Win	6–6	Jul 2010	Germany F7, Kassel	Futures	Clay	(Russia) Andrey Kuznetsov	6–4, 6–4
Win	7–6	Aug 2011	Beijing, China	Challenger	Hard	(Chinese Taipei) Yang Tsung-hua	6–1, 7–6^{(7–4)}
Loss	7–7	Aug 2012	Samarkand, Uzbekistan	Challenger	Clay	(Serbia) Dušan Lajović	3–6, 2–6
Loss	7–8	Sep 2012	Lermontov, Russia	Challenger	Clay	(Russia) Andrey Kuznetsov	7–6^{(9–7)}, 2–6, 2–6
Win	8–8	May 2014	Samarkand, Uzbekistan	Challenger	Clay	(Russia) Aslan Karatsev	7–6^{(7–4)}, 6–1
Loss	8–9	Jul 2014	Winnetka, United States	Challenger	Hard	(United States) Denis Kudla	2–6, 2–6
Loss	8–10	Aug 2014	Vancouver, Canada	Challenger	Hard	(Cyprus) Marcos Baghdatis	6–7^{(6–8)}, 3–6
Loss	8–11	Nov 2014	Bratislava, Slovakia	Challenger	Hard	(Germany) Peter Gojowczyk	6–7^{(2–7)}, 3–6
Loss	8–12	Nov 2014	Brescia, Italy	Challenger	Hard	(Ukraine) Illya Marchenko	4–6, 7–5, 2–6
Win	9–12	Feb 2015	Wrocław, Poland	Challenger	Hard	(Bosnia and Herzegovina) Mirza Bašić	6–3, 6–4
Win	10–12	Oct 2015	Agri, Turkey	Challenger	Hard	(India) Saketh Myneni	6–4, 6–4

=== Doubles: 12 (7–5) ===
Legend ATP Challenger (4–1) ITF Futures (3–4)	Finals by surface Hard (2–5) Clay (5–0) Grass (0–0) Carpet (0–0)

Result	W–L	Date	Tournament	Tier	Surface	Partner	Opponents	Score
Loss	0–1	Sep 2003	Italy F10, Selargius	Futures	Hard	(Italy) Thomas Holzer	(Italy) Alessandro Motti (Italy) Uros Vico	2–6, 2–6
Loss	0–2	Oct 2003	Spain F26, El Ejido	Futures	Hard	(Italy) Thomas Holzer	(Spain) Rafael Moreno-Negrin (Germany) Lars Uebel	4–6, 4–6
Loss	0–3	Jul 2005	Racanati, Italy	Challenger	Hard	(Russia) Evgeny Korolev	(Croatia) Lovro Zovko (Italy) Uros Vico	6–7^{(2–7)}, 3–4 ret.
Loss	0–4	Sep 2005	Italy F30, Sassari	Futures	Hard	(Italy) Manuel Gasbarri	(Italy) Adriano Biasella (Russia) Andrey Golubev	6–7^{(6–8)}, 1–6
Win	1–4	Oct 2005	Italy F32, Olbia	Futures	Clay	(Croatia) Ivan Cerović	(Italy) Filippo Figliomeni (Italy) Matteo Marrai	6–2, 6–3
Win	2–4	Oct 2005	Italy F34, Sassari	Futures	Clay	(Italy) Manuel Gasbarri	(Italy) Giancarlo Petrazzuolo (Italy) Federico Torresi	7–5, 3–6, 7–6^{(7–4)}
Loss	2–5	Feb 2006	Spain F4, Yecla	Futures	Hard	(Russia) Denis Matsukevich	(Spain) David Marrero (Spain) Gabriel Trujillo Soler	1–6, 2–6
Win	3–5	Jul 2009	Germany F8, Kassel	Futures	Clay	(United States) Rylan Rizza	(Germany) Christoph Thiemann (Germany) Marcel Thiemann	6–3, 6–3
Win	4–5	Sep 2010	Alphen, Netherlands	Challenger	Clay	(Austria) Bertram Steinberger	(Netherlands) Roy Bruggeling (Netherlands) Bas van der Valk	6–4, 6–1
Win	5–5	May 2013	Samarkand, Uzbekistan	Challenger	Clay	(Ukraine) Oleksandr Nedovyesov	(Moldova) Radu Albot (Australia) Jordan Kerr	6–1, 7–6^{(9–7)}
Win	6–5	Sep 2013	Fergana, Uzbekistan	Challenger	Hard	(Tunisia) Malek Jaziri	(Serbia) Ilija Bozoljac (Czech Republic) Roman Jebavý	6–3, 6–3
Win	7–5	Oct 2013	Kazan, Russia	Challenger	Hard	(Moldova) Radu Albot	(Belarus) Egor Gerasimov (Belarus) Dzmitry Zhyrmont	6–2, 6–7^{(3–7)}, [10–7]

== Performance timeline ==
Key
W	F	SF	QF	#R	RR	Q#	DNQ	A	NH

(W) winner; (F) finalist; (SF) semifinalist; (QF) quarterfinalist; (#R) rounds 4, 3, 2, 1; (RR) round-robin stage; (Q#) qualification round; (DNQ) did not qualify; (A) absent; (NH) not held; (SR) strike rate (events won / competed); (W–L) win–loss record.

=== Singles ===
Tournament	2007	2008	2009	2010	2011	2012	2013	2014	2015	2016	SR	W–L	Win%
Grand Slam tournaments
Australian Open	A	Q1	A	A	A	Q2	Q1	A	Q1	Q1	0 / 0	0–0	–
French Open	Q1	A	A	A	A	A	Q3	Q1	Q1	Q1	0 / 0	0–0	–
Wimbledon	A	A	A	A	A	Q3	Q2	Q2	Q2	Q1	0 / 0	0–0	–
US Open	A	A	A	A	A	Q1	Q1	Q1	Q1	A	0 / 0	0–0	–
Win–loss	0–0	0–0	0–0	0–0	0–0	0–0	0–0	0–0	0–0	0–0	0 / 0	0–0	–
ATP Tour Masters 1000
Indian Wells	A	A	A	A	A	A	A	A	Q1	A	0 / 0	0–0	–
Monte Carlo	A	A	A	A	A	A	A	A	A	Q1	0 / 0	0–0	–
Canada	A	Q2	A	A	A	A	A	A	A	A	0 / 0	0–0	–
Cincinnati	A	Q1	A	A	A	A	A	Q1	A	A	0 / 0	0–0	–
Win–loss	0–0	0–0	0–0	0–0	0–0	0–0	0–0	0–0	0–0	0–0	0 / 0	0–0	–
