= Bas van der Valk =

Dutch tennis player (born 1984)

- Full name: Bas van der Valk
- Country (sports): Netherlands
- Born: 25 April 1984 (age 41) Delft, Netherlands
- Plays: Left-handed
- Prize money: $24,078

Doubles
- Career record: 1–1
- Highest ranking: No. 428 (24 August 2009)

Bas van der Valk (born 25 April 1984) is a former professional tennis player from the Netherlands.

== Biography ==
Born in Delft, van der Valk had success as a junior, with a title win at the 2002 US Open, partnering with countryman Michel Koning in the boys' doubles event. He had made his only main draw appearance on the ATP Tour earlier in 2002 at the Ordina Open in Rosmalen, where he and Koning were a wildcard pairing in the doubles and made the quarter-finals by beating fourth seeds Michael Hill and Daniel Vacek.

A left-handed player, he continued to play on tour until 2010, reaching a best ranking in doubles of 428 in the world. He won eight ITF doubles titles and was a doubles runner-up at the Alphen Challenger in his final season.
