= 2011 Copa Sevilla – Doubles =

Doubles
- 2011 Copa Sevilla

Final
- Champions: (Spain) Daniel Muñoz de la Nava; (Spain) Rubén Ramírez Hidalgo
- Runners-up: (Spain) Gerard Granollers; (Spain) Adrián Menéndez
- Score: 6–4, 6–7^{(4–7)}, [13–11]

Events
Singles	Doubles
← 2010 ·	Copa Sevilla	· 2012 →

Daniel Muñoz de la Nava and Santiago Ventura were the defending champions, but Ventura decided not to participate.
Muñoz de la Nava plays alongside Rubén Ramírez Hidalgo and they won the title, defeating Gerard Granollers and Adrián Menéndez 6–4, 6–7^{(4–7)}, [13–11] in the final.

== Seeds ==
1. (Spain) Daniel Muñoz de la Nava / (Spain) Rubén Ramírez Hidalgo (champions)
2. (Spain) Gerard Granollers / (Spain) Adrián Menéndez (final)
3. (Spain) Daniel Gimeno Traver / (Spain) Iván Navarro (semifinals)
4. (Chile) Jorge Aguilar / (Australia) Nima Roshan (quarterfinals)

== Draw ==
=== Key ===
- Q = Qualifier
- WC = Wild card
- LL = Lucky loser
- Alt = Alternate
- SE = Special exempt
- PR = Protected ranking
- ITF = ITF entry
- JE = Junior exempt
- w/o = Walkover
- r = Retired
- d = Defaulted
- SR = Special ranking

=== Draw ===
First round

Quarterfinals

Semifinals

Final

1
- (Spain) D Muñoz de la Nava
- (Spain) R Ramírez Hidalgo
6
6

- (Brazil) D Dutra da Silva
- (Brazil) F Romboli
3
1

1
- (Spain) D Muñoz de la Nava
- (Spain) R Ramírez Hidalgo
6
6

- (Spain) Ó Burrieza
- (Spain) S Pérez-Pérez
2
4

- (Argentina) F Argüello
- (Argentina) D Schwartzman
3
1

- (Argentina) F Argüello
- (Argentina) D Schwartzman
6
6

1
- (Spain) D Muñoz de la Nava
- (Spain) R Ramírez Hidalgo
6
6

4
(Chile) J Aguilar
(Australia) Nima Roshan
7^{7}
6

- (Spain) A Ramos
- (Italy) S Vagnozzi
3
1

- (Spain) R Carballés
- (Spain) R Ojeda Lara
6^{2}
4

4
(Chile) J Aguilar
(Australia) N Roshan
7^{7}
3
[5]

- (Spain) A Ramos
- (Italy) S Vagnozzi
6
6

- (Spain) A Ramos
- (Italy) S Vagnozzi
6^{4}
6
[10]

WC
(Spain) Enrique Calderón Cabello
(Spain) Jaime Carmona-Rodríguez
0
0

1
- (Spain) D Muñoz de la Nava
- (Spain) R Ramírez Hidalgo
6
6^{4}
[13]

- (Spain) I Cervantes Huegun
- (Italy) M Marrai
6
7^{7}

2
- (Spain) G Granollers
- (Spain) A Menéndez
4
7^{7}
[11]

(Czech Republic) J Minář
(Czech Republic) Michal Schmid
3
6^{0}

- (Spain) I Cervantes Huegun
- (Italy) M Marrai
3
4

- (Spain) Juan Lizariturry
- (Spain) P Martín-Adalia
3
6^{4}

3
- (Spain) D Gimeno Traver
- (Spain) I Navarro
6
6

3
- (Spain) D Gimeno Traver
- (Spain) I Navarro
6
7^{7}

3
- (Spain) D Gimeno Traver
- (Spain) I Navarro
6^{9}
7^{7}
[9]

- (Spain) R Bautista Agut
- (Spain) J Martí
3
4

2
- (Spain) G Granollers
- (Spain) A Menéndez
7^{11}
6^{4}
[11]

- (Serbia) N Ćirić
- (Spain) G Olaso
6
6

- (Serbia) N Ćirić
- (Spain) G Olaso
4
4

WC
(Spain) Ángel Arias-Blasco
(Spain) José Osete-Montoro
1
1

2
- (Spain) G Granollers
- (Spain) A Menéndez
6
6

2
- (Spain) G Granollers
- (Spain) A Menéndez
6
6
