= 2019 Copa Sevilla – Singles =

Singles
- 2019 Copa Sevilla

Final
- Champion: (Spain) Alejandro Davidovich Fokina
- Runner-up: (Spain) Jaume Munar
- Score: 2–6, 6–2, 6–2

Events
Singles	Doubles
← 2018 ·	Copa Sevilla	· 2021 →

Kimmer Coppejans was the defending champion but lost in the quarterfinals to Alejandro Davidovich Fokina.

Davidovich Fokina won the title after defeating Jaume Munar 2–6, 6–2, 6–2 in the final.

== Seeds ==
All seeds receive a bye into the second round.

1. (Spain) Jaume Munar (final)
2. (Italy) Salvatore Caruso (semifinals)
3. (Spain) Alejandro Davidovich Fokina (champion)
4. (Italy) Paolo Lorenzi (third round)
5. (Belgium) Kimmer Coppejans (quarterfinals)
6. (Italy) Federico Gaio (second round)
7. (Spain) Pedro Martínez (third round)
8. (Spain) Guillermo García López (quarterfinals, withdrew)
9. (Germany) Yannick Hanfmann (second round)
10. (Spain) Tommy Robredo (second round)
11. (Spain) Adrián Menéndez Maceiras (second round)
12. (Spain) Mario Vilella Martínez (third round)
13. (Croatia) Viktor Galović (third round)
14. (Spain) Bernabé Zapata Miralles (third round)
15. (Argentina) Pedro Cachin (second round)
16. (Spain) Carlos Taberner (semifinals)

== Draw ==
=== Key ===
- Q = Qualifier
- WC = Wild card
- LL = Lucky loser
- Alt = Alternate
- SE = Special exempt
- PR = Protected ranking
- ITF = ITF entry
- JE = Junior exempt
- w/o = Walkover
- r = Retired
- d = Defaulted
- SR = Special ranking

=== Finals ===
Quarterfinals
1	(Spain) Jaume Munar	w/o
8	(Spain) Guillermo García López
16	(Spain) Carlos Taberner	3	6	6
PR	(Spain) Íñigo Cervantes	6	2	3
5	(Belgium) Kimmer Coppejans	3	0
3	(Spain) Alejandro Davidovich Fokina	6	6
WC	(Spain) Carlos Alcaraz	6	6^{4}	4
2	(Italy) Salvatore Caruso	4	7^{7}	6

Semifinals
1	(Spain) Jaume Munar	6	6
16	(Spain) Carlos Taberner	1	4
3	(Spain) Alejandro Davidovich Fokina	6	6
2	(Italy) Salvatore Caruso	1	2

Final
1	(Spain) Jaume Munar	6	2	2
3	(Spain) Alejandro Davidovich Fokina	2	6	6

=== Top half ===
==== Section 1 ====
First round
Q	(Spain) D Vega Hernández	3	5
(France) L Lokoli	6	7
(Spain) J Samper Montaña	3	2
(Italy) R Brancaccio	6	6
(Russia) A Zhurbin	5	3
(Spain) J Barranco Cosano	7	6
WC	(Spain) R Ojeda Lara	6	7^{7}
(Spain) Eduard Esteve Lobato	3	6^{5}

Second round
1	(Spain) J Munar	6	6
(France) L Lokoli	2	2
(Italy) R Brancaccio	6^{5}	4
14	(Spain) B Zapata Miralles	7^{7}	6
12	(Spain) M Vilella Martínez	7^{7}	7^{7}
(Spain) J Barranco Cosano	6^{5}	6^{2}
WC	(Spain) R Ojeda Lara	5	3
8	(Spain) G García López	7	6

Third round
1	(Spain) J Munar	6	6
14	(Spain) B Zapata Miralles	4	4
12	(Spain) M Vilella Martínez	6	6^{3}	4
8	(Spain) G García López	1	7^{7}	6

Quarterfinals
1	(Spain) J Munar	w/o
8	(Spain) G García López

==== Section 2 ====
First round
(Peru) N Álvarez	6	6
(France) Jules Okala	2	4
(Spain) D Gimeno Traver	4	6	7^{7}
(Spain) P Toledo Bagué	6	2	6^{2}
(Portugal) F Gil	3	0
PR	(Spain) Í Cervantes	6	6
(Slovakia) A Molčan	6	6
(Brazil) Jordan Correia	0	4

Second round
4	(Italy) P Lorenzi	7	6
(Peru) N Álvarez	5	3
(Spain) D Gimeno Traver	2	0
16	(Spain) C Taberner	6	6
11	(Spain) A Menéndez Maceiras	6^{7}	5
PR	(Spain) Í Cervantes	7^{9}	7
(Slovakia) A Molčan	4	6	6
6	(Italy) F Gaio	6	3	2

Third round
4	(Italy) P Lorenzi	1	2
16	(Spain) C Taberner	6	6
PR	(Spain) Í Cervantes	6	3	7
(Slovakia) A Molčan	0	6	5

Quarterfinals
16	(Spain) C Taberner	3	6	6
PR	(Spain) Í Cervantes	6	2	3

=== Bottom half ===
==== Section 3 ====
First round
WC	(Spain) C Gómez-Herrera	6	6
(Italy) F Forti	4	3
(Spain) Carlos Boluda-Purkiss	2	3
(Italy) J Ocleppo	6	6
PR	(Spain) D Muñoz de la Nava	6	1	6^{2}
(Brazil) P Sakamoto	2	6	7^{7}
(France) B Bonzi	4	6	6
WC	(Spain) P Llamas Ruiz	6	3	3

Second round
5	(Belgium) K Coppejans	1	6	7^{7}
WC	(Spain) C Gómez-Herrera	6	2	6^{5}
(Italy) J Ocleppo	7^{7}	7
10/WC	(Spain) T Robredo	6^{1}	5
15	(Argentina) P Cachin	4	2
(Brazil) P Sakamoto	6	6
(France) B Bonzi	6^{4}	1
3	(Spain) A Davidovich Fokina	7^{7}	6

Third round
5	(Belgium) K Coppejans	3	7^{7}	7
(Italy) J Ocleppo	6	6^{4}	5
(Brazil) P Sakamoto	3	2
3	(Spain) A Davidovich Fokina	6	6

Quarterfinals
5	(Belgium) K Coppejans	3	0
3	(Spain) A Davidovich Fokina	6	6

==== Section 4 ====
First round
Q	(Spain) G Granollers	0	1
(Spain) O Roca Batalla	6	6
WC	(Spain) C Alcaraz	6	6
(Japan) R Noguchi	1	4
(Argentina) H Casanova	5	0
(France) M Chazal	7	6
(France) M Hamou	6	6
(Italy) Fabrizio Ornago	4	1

Second round
7	(Spain) P Martínez	6	6
(Spain) O Roca Batalla	0	1
WC	(Spain) C Alcaraz	7^{7}	7^{7}
9	(Germany) Y Hanfmann	6^{3}	6^{4}
13	(Croatia) V Galović	6	6
(France) M Chazal	4	4
(France) M Hamou	0	3
2	(Italy) S Caruso	6	6

Third round
7	(Spain) P Martínez	7	4	3
WC	(Spain) C Alcaraz	5	6	6
13	(Croatia) V Galović	4	6^{3}
2	(Italy) S Caruso	6	7^{7}

Quarterfinals
WC	(Spain) C Alcaraz	6	6^{4}	4
2	(Italy) S Caruso	4	7^{7}	6
