= 2011 Copa Sevilla – Singles =

Singles
- 2011 Copa Sevilla

Final
- Champion: (Spain) Daniel Gimeno-Traver
- Runner-up: (Spain) Rubén Ramírez Hidalgo
- Score: 6–3, 6–3

Events
Singles	Doubles
← 2010 ·	Copa Sevilla	· 2012 →

Albert Ramos chose to defend his last year's title and reached the semifinals, where he lost to his compatriot and eventual champion Daniel Gimeno-Traver. 26-years-old player won the title, defeating Rubén Ramírez Hidalgo 6–3, 6–3 in the final.

== Seeds ==
1. (Spain) Pere Riba (semifinals, retired due to heat exhaustion)
2. (Spain) Albert Ramos (semifinals)
3. (Spain) Daniel Gimeno-Traver (champion)
4. (Spain) Rubén Ramírez Hidalgo (final)
5. (Poland) Jerzy Janowicz (second round)
6. (Italy) Paolo Lorenzi (quarterfinals)
7. (Russia) Evgeny Donskoy (quarterfinals)
8. (Serbia) Nikola Ćirić (quarterfinals)

== Draw ==
=== Key ===
- Q = Qualifier
- WC = Wild card
- LL = Lucky loser
- Alt = Alternate
- SE = Special exempt
- PR = Protected ranking
- ITF = ITF entry
- JE = Junior exempt
- w/o = Walkover
- r = Retired
- d = Defaulted
- SR = Special ranking

=== Finals ===
Semifinals
1/WC	(Spain) Pere Riba	4	6	0^{r}
4	(Spain) Rubén Ramírez Hidalgo	6	2	3
3	(Spain) Daniel Gimeno-Traver	7	6
2	(Spain) Albert Ramos	5	2

Final
4	(Spain) Rubén Ramírez Hidalgo	3	3
3	(Spain) Daniel Gimeno-Traver	6	6

=== Top half ===
First round
1/WC	(Spain) P Riba	0	6	6
(Brazil) A Ghem	6	3	4
Q	(Spain) P Martín-Adalia	3	5
Q	(Portugal) P Sousa	6	7
(Czech Republic) J Minář	1	3
(Argentina) F Argüello	6	6
(Spain) I Cervantes-Huegun	7^{10}	3	6^{5}
8	(Serbia) N Ćirić	6^{8}	6	7^{7}
4	(Spain) R Ramírez Hidalgo	6	6
WC	(Spain) R Carballes	3	2
(Brazil) F Romboli	2	5
(Spain) D Muñoz-De La Nava	6	7
(Portugal) J Sousa	3	1
Q	(Spain) G Olaso	6	6
(Italy) M Marrai	0	4
6	(Italy) P Lorenzi	6	6

Second round
1/WC	(Spain) P Riba	6	4	6
Q	(Portugal) P Sousa	3	6	2
(Argentina) F Argüello	6	6^{5}	2
8	(Serbia) N Ćirić	4	7^{7}	6
4	(Spain) R Ramírez Hidalgo	6	6
(Spain) D Muñoz-De La Nava	3	1
Q	(Spain) G Olaso	1	7	1
6	(Italy) P Lorenzi	6	5	6

Quarterfinals
1/WC	(Spain) P Riba	4	6	7^{7}
8	(Serbia) N Ćirić	6	2	6^{4}
4	(Spain) R Ramírez Hidalgo	6	6
6	(Italy) P Lorenzi	4	3

Semifinals
1/WC	(Spain) P Riba	4	6	0^{r}
4	(Spain) R Ramírez Hidalgo	6	2	3

=== Bottom half ===
First round
7	(Russia) E Donskoy	6	6
(Chile) J Aguilar	3	3
WC	(Spain) Ismael Rodríguez-Ramos	6^{4}	5
(Spain) G Granollers	7^{7}	7
(Spain) J Martí	5	6	4
(Spain) R Bautista-Agut	7	3	1^{r}
(Spain) A Menéndez	6^{4}	3
3	(Spain) D Gimeno-Traver	7^{7}	6
5	(Poland) J Janowicz	6	6
(Brazil) D Dutra da Silva	4	2
WC	(Spain) R Ojeda Lara	3	7	4
Q	(Czech Republic) Michal Schmid	6	5	6
(Italy) S Vagnozzi	6	6
(Italy) A Brizzi	3	2
(Spain) I Navarro	7^{7}	3	4
2	(Spain) A Ramos	6^{5}	6	6

Second round
7	(Russia) E Donskoy	6	7^{7}
(Spain) G Granollers	4	6^{5}
(Spain) J Martí	5	3
3	(Spain) D Gimeno-Traver	7	6
5	(Poland) J Janowicz	6^{2}	0
Q	(Czech Republic) M Schmid	7^{7}	6
(Italy) S Vagnozzi	3	4
2	(Spain) A Ramos	6	6

Quarterfinals
7	(Russia) E Donskoy	5	1
3	(Spain) D Gimeno-Traver	7	6
Q	(Czech Republic) M Schmid	1	5
2	(Spain) A Ramos	6	7

Semifinals
3	(Spain) D Gimeno-Traver	7	6
2	(Spain) A Ramos	5	2
