= 2010 Copa Sevilla – Singles =

Singles
- 2010 Copa Sevilla

Final
- Champion: (Spain) Albert Ramos-Viñolas
- Runner-up: (Spain) Pere Riba
- Score: 6–3, 3–6, 7–5

Events
Singles	Doubles
← 2009 ·	Copa Sevilla	· 2011 →

Pere Riba is the defending champion, but he lost in the final to Albert Ramos-Viñolas 6–3, 3–6, 7–5.

== Seeds ==
1. (Spain) Pere Riba (Runner up)
2. (Spain) Albert Ramos-Viñolas (champion)
3. (Spain) Santiago Ventura (first round)
4. (Portugal) Rui Machado (semifinals)
5. (Spain) Daniel Muñoz-de la Nava (first round)
6. (Spain) Óscar Hernández (first round)
7. (Spain) Iván Navarro (quarterfinals)
8. (Spain) Guillermo Olaso (first round)

== Draw ==
=== Key ===
- Q = Qualifier
- WC = Wild card
- LL = Lucky loser
- Alt = Alternate
- ITF = ITF entry
- PR = Protected ranking
- SR = Special ranking
- SE = Special exempt
- JE = Junior exempt
- JR = Junior Accelerator Programme entrant
- CO = College Accelerator Programme entrant
- NG = Next Gen Accelerator Program entrant
- w/o = Walkover
- r = Retired
- d = Defaulted

=== Finals ===
Semifinals
1	(Spain) Pere Riba	6	6
(Serbia) Nikola Ćirić	4	4
4	(Portugal) Rui Machado	4	6	3
2	(Spain) Albert Ramos-Viñolas	6	4	6

Final
1	(Spain) Pere Riba	3	6	5
2	(Spain) Albert Ramos-Viñolas	6	3	7

=== Top half ===
First round
1	(Spain) P Riba	4	6	6
(Spain) P Santos	6	1	2
(Spain) P Clar-Rosselló	4	4
(Russia) E Donskoy	6	6
WC	(Spain) M López	7	3	7
(Spain) S Gutiérrez-Ferrol	5	6	6^{5}
WC	(Spain) J Martí	5	6^{7}
7	(Spain) I Navarro	7	7
3	(Spain) S Ventura	6^{6}	1
(United Kingdom) J Ward	7	6
Q	(Spain) C Gómez-Herrera	6	6
Q	(Philippines) TC Huey	2	1
(Spain) A Boje-Ordóñez	6^{12}	6^{2}
(Spain) MÁ López Jaén	7	7
(Serbia) N Ćirić	4	6	7
6	(Spain) Ó Hernández	6	3	6^{1}

Second round
1	(Spain) P Riba	7	6
(Russia) E Donskoy	6^{3}	3
WC	(Spain) M López	5	1	r
7	(Spain) I Navarro	7	2
(United Kingdom) J Ward	6	6
Q	(Spain) C Gómez-Herrera	0	3
(Spain) MÁ López Jaén	2	1
(Serbia) N Ćirić	6	6

Quarterfinals
1	(Spain) P Riba	6	4	6
7	(Spain) I Navarro	4	6	2
(United Kingdom) J Ward	6	3	2
(Serbia) N Ćirić	3	6	6

Semifinals
1	(Spain) P Riba	6	6
(Serbia) N Ćirić	4	4

=== Bottom half ===
First round
5	(Spain) D Muñoz-de la Nava	3	1
Q	(Spain) P Martín-Adalia	6	6
WC	(Spain) I Rodríguez-Ramos	4	6	2
(Italy) M Crugnola	6	4	6
Q	(Spain) G Granollers-Pujol	6^{3}	0
(Spain) C Poch-Gradin	7	6
(France) A Sidorenko	6	2
4	(Portugal) R Machado	7	6
8	(Spain) G Olaso	4	3
(Portugal) J Sousa	6	6
(Portugal) P Sousa	6	6
(Italy) S Ianni	4	0
WC	(Spain) J Valenzuela-González	2	1
(Spain) G Trujillo-Soler	6	6
(France) L Rochette	4	4
2	(Spain) A Ramos-Viñolas	6	6

Second round
Q	(Spain) P Martín-Adalia	2	6	3
(Italy) M Crugnola	6	1	6
(Spain) C Poch-Gradin	6^{3}	2
4	(Portugal) R Machado	7	6
(Portugal) J Sousa	6	6
(Portugal) P Sousa	1	1
(Spain) G Trujillo-Soler	6	3	2
2	(Spain) A Ramos-Viñolas	2	6	6

Quarterfinals
(Italy) M Crugnola	3	1
4	(Portugal) R Machado	6	6
(Portugal) J Sousa	7	3	0
2	(Spain) A Ramos-Viñolas	5	6	6

Semifinals
4	(Portugal) R Machado	4	6	3
2	(Spain) A Ramos-Viñolas	6	4	6
