= 2010 Copa Sevilla – Doubles =

Doubles
- 2010 Copa Sevilla

Final
- Champion: (Spain) Daniel Muñoz de la Nava; (Spain) Santiago Ventura
- Runner-up: (Serbia) Nikola Ćirić; (Spain) Guillermo Olaso
- Score: 6–2, 7–5

Events
Singles	Doubles
- Copa Sevilla

Treat Conrad Huey and Harsh Mankad were the defending champions, however only Huey chose to compete this year.
He partnered with Photos Kallias from Cyprus, but they lost to Gerard Granollers Pujol and Albert Ramos Viñolas in the first round.
Daniel Muñoz de la Nava and Santiago Ventura won in the final, against Nikola Ćirić and Guillermo Olaso 6–2, 7–5.

== Seeds ==
1. (Spain) Daniel Muñoz de la Nava / (Spain) Santiago Ventura (champions)
2. (Portugal) João Sousa / (Spain) Gabriel Trujillo Soler (first round)
3. (Serbia) Nikola Ćirić / (Spain) Guillermo Olaso (runners-up)
4. (Spain) Javier Martí / (Spain) Carles Poch Gradin (first round)

== Main draw ==
Key

- Q = Qualifier
- WC = Wild card
- LL = Lucky loser
- Alt = Alternate
- ITF = ITF entry
- PR = Protected ranking
- SR = Special ranking
- SE = Special exempt
- JE = Junior exempt
- JR = Junior Accelerator Programme entrant
- CO = College Accelerator Programme entrant
- NG = Next Gen Accelerator Program entrant
- w/o = Walkover
- r = Retired
- d = Defaulted

=== Draw ===
First round

Quarterfinals

Semifinals

Finals

1
- (Spain) D Muñoz de la Nava
6^{3}
6
[15]

- (Russia) E Donskoy
- (United Kingdom) M Phillips
7
2
[13]

1
- (Spain) D Muñoz de la Nava
6
7

WC
- (Spain) J Beaus Barquín
2
4

- (Spain) MÁ López Jaén
- (Spain) I Navarro
3
6^{2}

- (Spain) MÁ López Jaén
- (Spain) I Navarro
6
6

1
- (Spain) D Muñoz de la Nava
6
6

4
- (Spain) J Martí
- (Spain) C Poch Gradin
7
4
[8]

- (Italy) M Crugnola
- (Italy) S Ianni
3
2

- (Italy) M Crugnola
- (Italy) S Ianni
5
6
[10]

- (Italy) M Crugnola
- (Italy) S Ianni
6
6

WC
- (Spain) R Ojeda Lara
2
3

- (Spain) A Boje Ordóñez
4
4

- (Spain) A Boje-Ordóñez
6
6

1
- (Spain) D Muñoz de la Nava
6
7

- (Spain) D de Miguel
- (Spain) M López
6
6

3
- (Serbia) N Ćirić
- (Spain) G Olaso
2
5

WC
- (Spain) Á Arias Blasco
- (Spain) J Osete Montoro
0
2

- (Spain) D de Miguel
- (Spain) M López
w/o

- (Russia) N Nesterov
- (Spain) S Pérez Pérez
4
1

3
- (Serbia) N Ćirić
- (Spain) G Olaso

3
- (Serbia) N Ćirić
- (Spain) G Olaso
6
6

3
- (Serbia) N Ćirić
- (Spain) G Olaso
7
3
[10]

- (Philippines) TC Huey
- (Cyprus) P Kallias
2
2

- (Spain) P Clar Rosselló
- (Spain) P Santos
6^{5}
6
[6]

- (Spain) G Granollers Pujol
- (Spain) A Ramos Viñolas
6
6

- (Spain) G Granollers Pujol
- (Spain) A Ramos Viñolas
5
5

- (Spain) P Clar Rosselló
- (Spain) P Santos
3
6
[11]

- (Spain) P Clar Rosselló
- (Spain) P Santos
7
7

2
- (Portugal) J Sousa
- (Spain) G Trujillo Soler
6
4
[9]
