= 2011 Copa Sevilla =

- Date: 5–10 September
- Edition: 14th
- Location: Sevilla, Spain

Champions

Singles
- (Spain) Daniel Gimeno Traver

Doubles
- (Spain) Daniel Muñoz de la Nava /; (Spain) Rubén Ramírez Hidalgo
← 2010 ·	Copa Sevilla	· 2012 →

The 2011 Copa Sevilla was a professional tennis tournament played on clay courts. It was the 14th edition of the tournament which was part of the 2011 ATP Challenger Tour. It took place in Sevilla, Spain between 5 and 10 September 2011.

== ATP entrants ==
=== Seeds ===
Country	Player	Rank^{1}	Seed
ESP	Pere Riba	70	1
ESP	Albert Ramos	71	2
ESP	Daniel Gimeno Traver	89	3
ESP	Rubén Ramírez Hidalgo	134	4
POL	Jerzy Janowicz	141	5
ITA	Paolo Lorenzi	146	6
RUS	Evgeny Donskoy	150	7
SRB	Nikola Ćirić	151	8

- ^{1} Rankings are as of August 29, 2011.

=== Other entrants ===
The following players received wildcards into the singles main draw:

- (Spain) Roberto Carballés
- (Spain) Ricardo Ojeda Lara
- (Spain) Pere Riba
- (Spain) Ismael Rodríguez-Ramos

The following players received entry from the qualifying draw:

- (Spain) Pablo Martín-Adalia
- (Portugal) Pedro Sousa
- (Spain) Guillermo Olaso
- (Czech Republic) Michal Schmid

== Champions ==
=== Singles ===
(Spain) Daniel Gimeno Traver def. (Spain) Rubén Ramírez Hidalgo, 6–3, 6–3

=== Doubles ===
(Spain) Daniel Muñoz de la Nava / (Spain) Rubén Ramírez Hidalgo def. (Spain) Gerard Granollers / (Spain) Adrián Menéndez, 6–4, 6–7^{(4–7)}, [13–11]
