= 2019 Copa Sevilla – Doubles =

Doubles
- 2019 Copa Sevilla

Final
- Champions: (Spain) Gerard Granollers (Spain) Pedro Martínez
- Runners-up: (Belgium) Kimmer Coppejans (Spain) Sergio Martos Gornés
- Score: 7–5, 6–4

Events
Singles	Doubles
- Copa Sevilla

Gerard Granollers and Pedro Martínez were the defending champions and successfully defended their title.

Granollers and Martínez won the title after defeating Kimmer Coppejans and Sergio Martos Gornés 7–5, 6–4 in the final.

== Seeds ==
1. (Brazil) Fabrício Neis / (Spain) David Vega Hernández (first round)
2. (Spain) Gerard Granollers / (Spain) Pedro Martínez (champions)
3. (Spain) Guillermo García López / (Spain) David Marrero (first round)
4. (France) Benjamin Bonzi / (Italy) Julian Ocleppo (semifinals)

== Draw ==
Key

- Q = Qualifier
- WC = Wild card
- LL = Lucky loser
- Alt = Alternate
- ITF = ITF entry
- PR = Protected ranking
- SR = Special ranking
- SE = Special exempt
- JE = Junior exempt
- JR = Junior Accelerator Programme entrant
- CO = College Accelerator Programme entrant
- NG = Next Gen Accelerator Program entrant
- w/o = Walkover
- r = Retired
- d = Defaulted

First round
1	(Brazil) F Neis (Spain) D Vega Hernández	5	1
(Belgium) K Coppejans (Spain) S Martos Gornés	7	6
WC	(Serbia) M Djokovic (Spain) C Gómez-Herrera	3	6	[7]
(Argentina) P Cachin (Spain) B Zapata Miralles	6	3	[10]
3	(Spain) G García López (Spain) D Marrero	6	6^{6}	[7]
(Italy) R Brancaccio (Spain) Eduard Esteve Lobato	3	7^{8}	[10]
PR	(Spain) Í Cervantes (Spain) O Roca Batalla	4	7	[10]
(Argentina) H Casanova (Brazil) P Sakamoto	6	5	[6]
(Netherlands) M Vervoort (Spain) M Vilella Martínez	2	6	[10]
(Spain) J Barranco Cosano (Peru) A Merino	6	0	[6]
WC	(Spain) D Gimeno Traver (Spain) R Ojeda Lara	1	6^{11}
4	(France) B Bonzi (Italy) J Ocleppo	6	7^{13}
(Italy) F Gaio (Italy) P Lorenzi	6	6
(France) M Hamou (France) Jules Okala	4	3
WC	(Spain) Carlos Boluda-Purkiss (Brazil) Jordan Correia	3	2
2	(Spain) G Granollers (Spain) P Martínez	6	6

Quarterfinals
(Belgium) K Coppejans (Spain) S Martos Gornés	6	7
(Argentina) P Cachin (Spain) B Zapata Miralles	2	5
(Italy) R Brancaccio (Spain) E Esteve Lobato	3	6^{7}
PR	(Spain) Í Cervantes (Spain) O Roca Batalla	6	7^{9}
(Netherlands) M Vervoort (Spain) M Vilella Martínez	6^{8}	4
4	(France) B Bonzi (Italy) J Ocleppo	7^{10}	6
(Italy) F Gaio (Italy) P Lorenzi	2	6	[7]
2	(Spain) G Granollers (Spain) P Martínez	6	3	[10]

Semifinals
(Belgium) K Coppejans (Spain) S Martos Gornés	7^{7}	6
PR	(Spain) Í Cervantes (Spain) O Roca Batalla	6^{3}	3
4	(France) B Bonzi (Italy) J Ocleppo	1	6^{5}
2	(Spain) G Granollers (Spain) P Martínez	6	7^{7}

Final
(Belgium) K Coppejans (Spain) S Martos Gornés	5	4
2	(Spain) G Granollers (Spain) P Martínez	7	6
