= 2012 Copa Sevilla – Doubles =

Doubles
- 2012 Copa Sevilla

Final
- Champions: (Serbia) Nikola Ćirić; (Serbia) Boris Pašanski
- Runners-up: (Netherlands) Stephan Fransen; (Netherlands) Jesse Huta Galung
- Score: 5–7, 6–4, [10–6]

Events
Singles	Doubles
← 2011 ·	Copa Sevilla	· 2013 →

Daniel Muñoz de la Nava and Rubén Ramírez Hidalgo were the defending champions but decided not to participate.
Nikola Ćirić and Boris Pašanski won the title, defeating Stephan Fransen and Jesse Huta Galung 5–7, 6–4, [10–6] in the final.

== Seeds ==
1. (Australia) Adam Hubble / (Australia) Rameez Junaid (first round)
2. (Spain) Íñigo Cervantes Huegun / (Spain) Gerard Granollers (quarterfinals)
3. (Argentina) Facundo Argüello / (Spain) Javier Martí (semifinals, withdrew)
4. (Spain) Iván Navarro / (Spain) Gabriel Trujillo Soler (quarterfinals)

== Draw ==
=== Key ===
- Q = Qualifier
- WC = Wild card
- LL = Lucky loser
- Alt = Alternate
- SE = Special exempt
- PR = Protected ranking
- ITF = ITF entry
- JE = Junior exempt
- w/o = Walkover
- r = Retired
- d = Defaulted
- SR = Special ranking

=== Draw ===
First round

Quarterfinals

Semifinals

Final

1
- (Australia) A Hubble
- (Australia) R Junaid
6^{5}
6^{7}

- (Serbia) N Ćirić
- (Serbia) B Pašanski
7^{7}
7^{9}

- (Serbia) N Ćirić
- (Serbia) B Pašanski
3
7
[10]

- (Czech Republic) Michal Konečný
- (Ukraine) O Nedovyesov
6^{8}
6
[10]

- (Czech Republic) M Konečný
- (Ukraine) O Nedovyesov
6
5
[2]

WC
(Spain) David Estruch
(Spain) Borja Rodríguez Manzano
7^{10}
3
[7]

- (Serbia) N Ćirić
- (Serbia) B Pašanski
w/o

3
- (Argentina) F Argüello
- (Spain) J Martí
6
6

3
- (Argentina) F Argüello
- (Spain) J Martí

(Spain) Agustín Boje-Ordóñez
(Spain) Juan José Leal-Gómez
1
2

3
- (Argentina) F Argüello
- (Spain) J Martí
6
7^{7}

(Japan) T Daniel
(Russia) Alexander Rumyantsev
6^{5}
5

(Netherlands) R Frantzen
(Netherlands) N van der Meer
3
6^{4}

(Netherlands) Romano Frantzen
(Netherlands) Nick van der Meer
7^{7}
7

- (Serbia) N Ćirić
- (Serbia) B Pašanski
5
6
[10]

- (Netherlands) S Fransen
- (Netherlands) J Huta Galung
6
6

- (Netherlands) S Fransen
- (Netherlands) J Huta Galung
7
4
[6]

- (Spain) Marc Giner
- (Spain) J Samper Montaña
3
4

- (Netherlands) S Fransen
- (Netherlands) J Huta Galung
6
6

- (France) N Devilder
- (France) D Guez
2
3

4
- (Spain) I Navarro
- (Spain) G Trujillo Soler
3
4

4
- (Spain) I Navarro
- (Spain) G Trujillo Soler
6
6

- (Netherlands) S Fransen
- (Netherlands) J Huta Galung
6
6

- (Germany) N Langer
- (Germany) J-L Struff
2
5

- (Canada) S Diez
- (Spain) S Gutiérrez Ferrol
1
2

- (Canada) S Diez
- (Spain) S Gutiérrez Ferrol
6
7

- (Canada) S Diez
- (Spain) S Gutiérrez Ferrol
6
3
[10]

WC
(Spain) R Ojeda Lara
(Spain) Alberto Rodríguez-Cervantes
2
4

2
- (Spain) I Cervantes Huegun
- (Spain) G Granollers
2
6
[7]

2
- (Spain) I Cervantes Huegun
- (Spain) G Granollers
6
6
