= 2019 Copa Sevilla =

- Date: 9–15 September
- Edition: 22nd
- Surface: Yellow clay
- Location: Seville, Spain

Champions

Singles
- (Spain) Alejandro Davidovich Fokina

Doubles
- (Spain) Gerard Granollers / (Spain) Pedro Martínez
← 2018 ·	Copa Sevilla	· 2021 →

The 2019 Copa Sevilla was a professional tennis tournament played on clay courts. It was the 22nd edition of the tournament which was part of the 2019 ATP Challenger Tour. It took place in Seville, Spain between 9 and 15 September 2019.

== Singles main-draw entrants ==
=== Seeds ===
Country	Player	Rank^{1}	Seed
ESP	Jaume Munar	97	1
ITA	Salvatore Caruso	102	2
ESP	Alejandro Davidovich Fokina	126	3
ITA	Paolo Lorenzi	135	4
BEL	Kimmer Coppejans	138	5
ITA	Federico Gaio	145	6
ESP	Pedro Martínez	153	7
ESP	Guillermo García López	165	8
GER	Yannick Hanfmann	182	9
ESP	Tommy Robredo	184	10
ESP	Adrián Menéndez Maceiras	193	11
ESP	Mario Vilella Martínez	202	12
CRO	Viktor Galović	224	13
ESP	Bernabé Zapata Miralles	234	14
ARG	Pedro Cachin	253	15
ESP	Carlos Taberner	254	16

- ^{1} Rankings are as of 26 August 2019.

=== Other entrants ===
The following players received wildcards into the singles main draw:

- (Spain) Carlos Alcaraz
- (Spain) Carlos Gómez-Herrera
- (Spain) Pablo Llamas Ruiz
- (Spain) Ricardo Ojeda Lara
- (Spain) Tommy Robredo

The following players received entry into the singles main draw using protected rankings:

- (Spain) Íñigo Cervantes
- (Spain) Daniel Muñoz de la Nava

The following players received entry from the qualifying draw:

- (Spain) Gerard Granollers
- (Spain) David Vega Hernández

== Champions ==
=== Singles ===
- (Spain) Alejandro Davidovich Fokina def. (Spain) Jaume Munar 2–6, 6–2, 6–2.

=== Doubles ===
- (Spain) Gerard Granollers / (Spain) Pedro Martínez def. (Belgium) Kimmer Coppejans / (Spain) Sergio Martos Gornés 7–5, 6–4.
