= 2016 Copa Sevilla – Singles =

Singles
- 2016 Copa Sevilla

Final
- Champion: (Norway) Casper Ruud
- Runner-up: (Japan) Taro Daniel
- Score: 6–3, 6–4

Events
| Singles | Doubles |
| ← 2015 · | Copa Sevilla | · 2017 → |

Pedro Cachin was the defending champion but lost in the semifinals to Casper Ruud.

Ruud won the title after defeating Taro Daniel 6–3, 6–4 in the final.

== Seeds ==
1. (Spain) Íñigo Cervantes (quarterfinals)
2. (Austria) Gerald Melzer (quarterfinals)
3. (Japan) Taro Daniel (final)
4. (Spain) Daniel Gimeno Traver (first round, retired)
5. (Slovakia) Andrej Martin (second round)
6. (Belgium) Arthur De Greef (quarterfinals)
7. (Spain) Rubén Ramírez Hidalgo (first round, retired)
8. (Spain) Enrique López Pérez (first round)

== Draw ==
=== Key ===
- Q = Qualifier
- WC = Wild card
- LL = Lucky loser
- Alt = Alternate
- SE = Special exempt
- PR = Protected ranking
- ITF = ITF entry
- JE = Junior exempt
- w/o = Walkover
- r = Retired
- d = Defaulted
- SR = Special ranking

=== Finals ===
Semifinals
Q | (Norway) Casper Ruud | 4 | 6 | 6
(Argentina) Pedro Cachin | 6 | 3 | 2
3 | (Japan) Taro Daniel | 6 | 6
(Poland) Kamil Majchrzak | 2 | 1

Final
Q | (Norway) Casper Ruud | 6 | 6
3 | (Japan) Taro Daniel | 3 | 4

=== Top half ===
First round
1 | (Spain) Í Cervantes | 6 | 3 | 6
Q | (Chile) Bastián Malla | 3 | 6 | 3
(Italy) L Giustino | 4 | 4
(Chile) C Garín | 6 | 6
(Spain) D Pérez Sanz | 6 | 6^{1} | 4
Q | (Norway) C Ruud | 4 | 7^{7} | 6
(Czech Republic) J Mertl | 5 | 3
5 | (Slovakia) A Martin | 7 | 6
4 | (Spain) D Gimeno Traver | 6 | 6^{1} | 0^{r}
(Spain) O Roca Batalla | 4 | 7^{7} | 0
(Argentina) P Cachin | 6 | 7^{11}
WC | (Spain) P Martínez | 2 | 6^{9}
WC | (Spain) R Ojeda Lara | 2 | 1
WC | (Spain) C Taberner | 6 | 6
(Japan) A Santillan | 6^{2} | 5
6 | (Belgium) A De Greef | 7^{7} | 7

Second round
1 | (Spain) Í Cervantes | 6^{4} | 6 | 7^{7}
(Chile) C Garín | 7^{7} | 4 | 6^{1}
Q | (Norway) C Ruud | 6 | 6
5 | (Slovakia) A Martin | 3 | 3
(Spain) O Roca Batalla | 6^{0} | 0
(Argentina) P Cachin | 7^{7} | 6
WC | (Spain) C Taberner | 4 | 6 | 3
6 | (Belgium) A De Greef | 6 | 3 | 6

Quarterfinals
1 | (Spain) Í Cervantes | 6 | 1 | 4
Q | (Norway) C Ruud | 3 | 6 | 6
(Argentina) P Cachin | 3 | 6 | 7
6 | (Belgium) A De Greef | 6 | 3 | 5

Semifinals
Q | (Norway) C Ruud | 4 | 6 | 6
(Argentina) P Cachin | 6 | 3 | 2

=== Bottom half ===
First round
8 | (Spain) E López Pérez | 3 | 7^{7} | 6
(Argentina) T Lipovšek Puches | 6 | 6^{2} | 0
Q | (Australia) C O'Connell | 3 | 5
(Russia) A Rublev | 6 | 7
(Italy) R Bellotti | 6 | 1
PR | (Brazil) F de Paula | 1 | 0^{r}
LL | (Spain) R Ortega Olmedo | 1 | 4
3 | (Japan) T Daniel | 6 | 6
7 | (Spain) R Ramírez Hidalgo | 0 | 0^{r}
(Poland) K Majchrzak | 6 | 4
(France) A Michon | 6 | 2 | 6
(Serbia) M Tepavac | 3 | 6 | 2
(Germany) Jeremy Jahn | 7^{7} | 6
Q | (Spain) P Toledo Bagué | 6^{2} | 1
WC | (Spain) P Andújar | 1 | 2
2 | (Austria) G Melzer | 6 | 6

Second round
8 | (Spain) E López Pérez | 6^{5} | 6^{5}
(Russia) A Rublev | 7^{7} | 7^{7}
(Italy) R Bellotti | 2 | 1
3 | (Japan) T Daniel | 6 | 6
(Poland) K Majchrzak | 7 | 2 | 6
(France) A Michon | 5 | 6 | 3
(Germany) J Jahn | 0 | 4
2 | (Austria) G Melzer | 6 | 6

Quarterfinals
(Russia) A Rublev | 6 | 3 | 2
3 | (Japan) T Daniel | 4 | 6 | 6
(Poland) K Majchrzak | 6 | 6
2 | (Austria) G Melzer | 3 | 1

Semifinals
3 | (Japan) T Daniel | 6 | 6
(Poland) K Majchrzak | 2 | 1
