= 2013 Copa Sevilla – Singles =

Singles
- 2013 Copa Sevilla

Final
- Champion: (Spain) Daniel Gimeno-Traver
- Runner-up: (France) Stéphane Robert
- Score: 6–4, 7–6^{(7–2)}

Events
Singles	Doubles
← 2012 ·	Copa Sevilla	· 2014 →

Daniel Gimeno-Traver won the title for the third year in a row, defeating Stéphane Robert 6–4, 7–6^{(7–2)}

== Seeds ==
1. (Spain) Daniel Gimeno-Traver (champion)
2. (Spain) Albert Ramos (quarterfinals)
3. (Russia) Andrey Kuznetsov (second round)
4. (France) Stéphane Robert (final)
5. (Spain) Pere Riba (first round)
6. (Argentina) Renzo Olivo (semifinals)
7. (France) Maxime Teixeira (second round, retired)
8. (Spain) Roberto Carballés Baena (first round)

== Draw ==
=== Key ===
- Q = Qualifier
- WC = Wild card
- LL = Lucky loser
- Alt = Alternate
- SE = Special exempt
- PR = Protected ranking
- ITF = ITF entry
- JE = Junior exempt
- w/o = Walkover
- r = Retired
- d = Defaulted
- SR = Special ranking

=== Finals ===
Semifinals
1	(Spain) Daniel Gimeno-Traver	7	6
6	(Argentina) Renzo Olivo	5	2
4	(France) Stéphane Robert	6	6
(Germany) Andreas Beck	4	3

Final
1	(Spain) Daniel Gimeno-Traver	6	7^{7}
4	(France) Stéphane Robert	4	6^{2}

=== Top half ===
First round
1	(Spain) D Gimeno-Traver	6	6
Q	(Spain) D Pérez Sanz	3	2
Q	(Italy) Enrico Burzi	6	6
WC	(Spain) S Gutiérrez Ferrol	3	3
(Czech Republic) R Jebavý	3	2
(Italy) R Bellotti	6	6
(Russia) A Lobkov	6	1	2
7	(France) M Teixeira	3	6	6
3	(Russia) A Kuznetsov	6^{3}	6	6
Q	(Czech Republic) Michal Schmid	7^{7}	3	3
(Italy) A Brizzi	6	4	4
(United Kingdom) A Ward	4	6	6
(Russia) V Baluda	6	6
(Spain) J Checa-Calvo	2	4
WC	(Spain) R Ojeda Lara	3	2
6	(Argentina) R Olivo	6	6

Second round
1	(Spain) D Gimeno-Traver	7	6
Q	(Italy) E Burzi	5	3
(Italy) R Bellotti	6	4
7	(France) M Teixeira	3	2^{r}
3	(Russia) A Kuznetsov	6	5	5
(United Kingdom) A Ward	4	7	7
(Russia) V Baluda	3	7^{7}	2
6	(Argentina) R Olivo	6	6^{4}	6

Quarterfinals
1	(Spain) D Gimeno-Traver	6	6
(Italy) R Bellotti	2	4
(United Kingdom) A Ward	6^{4}	6	6^{3}
6	(Argentina) R Olivo	7^{7}	1	7^{7}

Semifinals
1	(Spain) D Gimeno-Traver	7	6
6	(Argentina) R Olivo	5	2

=== Bottom half ===
First round
8	(Spain) R Carballés Baena	3	6	6^{5}
Alt	(Spain) C Gómez-Herrera	6	3	7^{7}
(Spain) Marc Giner	3	4
(Italy) L Giustino	6	6
(France) A Michon	7^{7}	6
WC	(Spain) R Ortega-Olmedo	6^{4}	2
WC	(Spain) Agustín Boje-Ordóñez	1	4
4	(France) S Robert	6	6
5	(Spain) P Riba	4	4
(Germany) A Beck	6	6
(Japan) T Daniel	2	6	6
Q	(Netherlands) Miliaan Niesten	6	4	4
PR	(Spain) Ó Hernández	4	1
(Spain) E López-Pérez	6	6
(Argentina) M Trungelliti	1	2
2	(Spain) A Ramos	6	6

Second round
Alt	(Spain) C Gómez-Herrera	6	5	6
(Italy) L Giustino	3	7	1
(France) A Michon	2	1
4	(France) S Robert	6	6
(Germany) A Beck	6	6
(Japan) T Daniel	3	4
(Spain) E López-Pérez	6^{2}	2
2	(Spain) A Ramos	7^{7}	6

Quarterfinals
Alt	(Spain) C Gómez-Herrera	4	6^{2}
4	(France) S Robert	6	7^{7}
(Germany) A Beck	7	6
2	(Spain) A Ramos	5	1

Semifinals
4	(France) S Robert	6	6
(Germany) A Beck	4	3
