= 2010 Copa Sevilla =

- Date: September 6–11
- Edition: 13th
- Location: Sevilla, Spain

Champions

Singles
- (Spain) Albert Ramos-Viñolas

Doubles
- (Spain) Daniel Muñoz de la Nava / (Spain) Santiago Ventura
← 2009 ·	Copa Sevilla	· 2011 →

The 2010 Copa Sevilla was a professional tennis tournament played on clay courts. It was the 13th edition of the tournament which was part of the 2010 ATP Challenger Tour. It took place in Sevilla, Spain between 6 and 11 September.

== ATP entrants ==
=== Seeds ===
Nationality	Player	Ranking*	Seeding
ESP	Pere Riba	76	1
ESP	Albert Ramos-Viñolas	117	2
ESP	Santiago Ventura	125	3
POR	Rui Machado	126	4
ESP	Daniel Muñoz de la Nava	143	5
ESP	Óscar Hernández	159	6
ESP	Iván Navarro	160	7
ESP	Guillermo Olaso	240	8

- Rankings are as of August 30, 2010.

=== Other entrants ===
The following players received wildcards into the singles main draw:

- (Spain) Marc López
- (Spain) Javier Martí
- (Spain) Ismael Rodríguez-Ramos
- (Spain) Javier Valenzuela-González

The following players received entry from the qualifying draw:

- (Spain) Carlos Gómez-Herrera
- (Spain) Gerard Granollers-Pujol
- (Philippines) Treat Conrad Huey
- (Spain) Pablo Martín-Adalia

== Champions ==
=== Singles ===
(Spain) Albert Ramos-Viñolas def. (Spain) Pere Riba, 6–3, 3–6, 7–5

=== Doubles ===
(Spain) Daniel Muñoz de la Nava / (Spain) Santiago Ventura def. (Serbia) Nikola Ćirić / (Spain) Guillermo Olaso, 6–2, 7–5
