= 2015 Copa Sevilla – Singles =

Singles
- 2015 Copa Sevilla

Final
- Champion: (Argentina) Pedro Cachin
- Runner-up: (Spain) Pablo Carreño
- Score: 7–5, 6–3

Events
Singles	Doubles
← 2014 ·	Copa Sevilla	· 2016 →

Pedro Cachín won his maiden Challenger title, defeating top seed and defending champion Pablo Carreño Busta in the final, 7–5, 6–3.

== Seeds ==
1. (Spain) Pablo Carreño Busta (final)
2. (Spain) Daniel Gimeno-Traver (first round)
3. (Spain) Íñigo Cervantes (semifinals, retired)
4. (Spain) Albert Montañés (first round)
5. (Spain) Adrián Menéndez-Maceiras (first round)
6. (Argentina) Renzo Olivo (quarterfinals)
7. (Czech Republic) Jan Mertl (first round)
8. (Spain) Jordi Samper-Montaña (semifinals)

== Draw ==
=== Key ===
- Q = Qualifier
- WC = Wild card
- LL = Lucky loser
- Alt = Alternate
- SE = Special exempt
- PR = Protected ranking
- ITF = ITF entry
- JE = Junior exempt
- w/o = Walkover
- r = Retired
- d = Defaulted
- SR = Special ranking

=== Finals ===
Semifinals
1	(Spain) Pablo Carreño Busta	6	4
3	(Spain) Íñigo Cervantes	4	0^{r}
8	(Spain) Jordi Samper-Montaña	6	0	2
(Argentina) Pedro Cachin	4	6	6

Final
1	(Spain) Pablo Carreño Busta	5	3
(Argentina) Pedro Cachin	7	6

=== Top half ===
First round
1	(Spain) P Carreño Busta	6	6
(Italy) M Bortolotti	3	2
(France) A Michon	6	6
WC	(Spain) J Munar	4	3
(Spain) P Riba	6	6
WC	(Spain) R Ojeda Lara	3	1
(Italy) F Cipolla	6	1	6
7	(Czech Republic) J Mertl	4	6	1
3	(Spain) Í Cervantes	7^{8}	6
(Slovakia) J Kovalík	6^{6}	3
(Brazil) F Romboli	5	3
(France) M Teixeira	7	6
Q	(Russia) I Gakhov	6	2	1
(Morocco) L Ouahab	0	6	6
WC	(Spain) M Vilella Martínez	6	0	1
6	(Argentina) R Olivo	2	6	6

Second round
1	(Spain) P Carreño Busta	7^{7}	6
(France) A Michon	6^{3}	3
(Spain) P Riba	6	6
(Italy) F Cipolla	1	4
3	(Spain) Í Cervantes	7^{7}	6
(France) M Teixeira	6^{4}	4
(Morocco) L Ouahab	4	4
6	(Argentina) R Olivo	6	6

Quarterfinals
1	(Spain) P Carreño Busta	6	6
(Spain) P Riba	3	4
3	(Spain) Í Cervantes	6	6
6	(Argentina) R Olivo	3	2

Semifinals
1	(Spain) P Carreño Busta	6	4
3	(Spain) Í Cervantes	4	0^{r}

=== Bottom half ===
First round
8	(Spain) J Samper-Montaña	6	6
(Spain) R Ortega-Olmedo	3	3
(Spain) Georgi Rumenov Payakov	6	4	6^{6}
(Spain) D Pérez Sanz	0	6	7^{8}
WC	(Spain) Agustin Boje-Ordonez	4	1
Q	(Spain) D Vega Hernández	6	6
(Poland) K Majchrzak	6	6
4	(Spain) A Montañés	1	4
5	(Spain) A Menéndez-Maceiras	6	3	4
(Serbia) M Zekić	4	6	6
Q	(Spain) J Lizariturry	3	5
(Spain) R Ramírez Hidalgo	6	7
(Serbia) P Krstin	3	6	2
Q	(Netherlands) M Middelkoop	6	3	6
(Argentina) P Cachin	6	6
2	(Spain) D Gimeno-Traver	3	4

Second round
8	(Spain) J Samper-Montaña	6	7^{7}
(Spain) D Pérez Sanz	1	6^{5}
Q	(Spain) D Vega Hernández	4	1
(Poland) K Majchrzak	6	6
(Serbia) M Zekić	6	6
(Spain) R Ramírez Hidalgo	3	3
Q	(Netherlands) M Middelkoop	6	1	3
(Argentina) P Cachin	4	6	6

Quarterfinals
8	(Spain) J Samper-Montaña	2	7	6
(Poland) K Majchrzak	6	5	4
(Serbia) M Zekić	4	6	3
(Argentina) P Cachin	6	3	6

Semifinals
8	(Spain) J Samper-Montaña	6	0	2
(Argentina) P Cachin	4	6	6
