= 2012 Copa Sevilla – Singles =

Singles
- 2012 Copa Sevilla

Final
- Champion: (Spain) Daniel Gimeno-Traver
- Runner-up: (Spain) Tommy Robredo
- Score: 6–3, 6–2

Events
Singles	Doubles
← 2011 ·	Copa Sevilla	· 2013 →

Daniel Gimeno-Traver successfully defended his title, defeating Tommy Robredo 6–3, 6–2 in the final.

== Seeds ==
1. (Spain) Roberto Bautista-Agut (first round)
2. (Spain) Daniel Gimeno-Traver (champion)
3. (Argentina) Federico Delbonis (first round)
4. (Portugal) Rui Machado (first round, retired because of a right knee injury)
5. (Spain) Iñigo Cervantes Huegun (semifinals)
6. (Spain) Tommy Robredo (final)
7. (Spain) Javier Martí (quarterfinals)
8. (France) Nicolas Devilder (second round)

== Draw ==
=== Key ===
- Q = Qualifier
- WC = Wild card
- LL = Lucky loser
- Alt = Alternate
- SE = Special exempt
- PR = Protected ranking
- ITF = ITF entry
- JE = Junior exempt
- w/o = Walkover
- r = Retired
- d = Defaulted
- SR = Special ranking

=== Finals ===
Semifinals
6/WC	(Spain) Tommy Robredo	7^{7}	4	7^{7}
5	(Spain) Iñigo Cervantes Huegun	6^{3}	6	6^{3}
(Serbia) Boris Pašanski	2	3
2	(Spain) Daniel Gimeno-Traver	6	6

Final
6/WC	(Spain) Tommy Robredo	3	2
2	(Spain) Daniel Gimeno-Traver	6	6

=== Top half ===
First round
1	(Spain) R Bautista-Agut	4	2
(Argentina) F Argüello	6	6
(Czech Republic) Michal Konečný	3	6	1
(Netherlands) J Huta Galung	6	4	6
Q	(Netherlands) Nick van der Meer	5	6	6
(France) D Guez	7	0	0
(Spain) I Navarro	3	2
6/WC	(Spain) T Robredo	6	6
4	(Portugal) R Machado	5	r
(Ukraine) O Nedovyesov	7
(Belgium) Y Mertens	6^{1}	7	6
WC	(Spain) M Vilella Martínez	7^{7}	5	0
Q	(Spain) David Estruch	5	2
Alt	(Japan) T Daniel	7	6
Q	(Spain) D Pérez Sanz	3	2
5	(Spain) I Cervantes Huegun	6	6

Second round
(Argentina) F Argüello	6	6
(Netherlands) J Huta Galung	4	1
Q	(Netherlands) Nick van der Meer	6^{4}	3
6/WC	(Spain) T Robredo	7^{7}	6
(Ukraine) O Nedovyesov	6	3	7^{7}
(Belgium) Y Mertens	4	6	6^{5}
Alt	(Japan) T Daniel	0	3
5	(Spain) I Cervantes Huegun	6	6

Quarterfinals
(Argentina) F Argüello	6^{4}	6	0^{r}
6/WC	(Spain) T Robredo	7^{7}	2	1
(Ukraine) O Nedovyesov	1	6^{1}
5	(Spain) I Cervantes Huegun	6	7^{7}

Semifinals
6/WC	(Spain) T Robredo	7^{7}	4	7^{7}
5	(Spain) I Cervantes Huegun	6^{3}	6	6^{4}

=== Bottom half ===
First round
8	(France) N Devilder	6	1	6
WC	(Spain) Agustín Boje-Ordóñez	3	6	3
(Serbia) B Pašanski	6	6
(Serbia) N Ćirić	4	4
(Germany) J-L Struff	6	6
WC	(Spain) D Vega Hernández	2	1
(Spain) S Gutiérrez Ferrol	6	6
3	(Argentina) F Delbonis	2	2
7	(Spain) J Martí	6	6
Q	(Venezuela) R Rodríguez	3	3
(Spain) G Granollers	6	6
(Spain) J Samper-Montaña	3	3
(Canada) S Diez	3	4
(Germany) N Langer	6	6
(Czech Republic) D Lojda	2	3
2	(Spain) D Gimeno-Traver	6	6

Second round
8	(France) N Devilder	1	2
(Serbia) B Pašanski	6	6
(Germany) J-L Struff	7^{7}	3	7^{9}
(Spain) S Gutiérrez Ferrol	6^{2}	6	6^{7}
7	(Spain) J Martí	6	6^{4}	6
(Spain) G Granollers	3	7^{7}	3
(Germany) N Langer	2	2
2	(Spain) D Gimeno-Traver	6	6

Quarterfinals
(Serbia) B Pašanski	6	6
(Germany) J-L Struff	4	4
7	(Spain) J Martí	3	2
2	(Spain) D Gimeno-Traver	6	6

Semifinals
(Serbia) B Pašanski	2	3
2	(Spain) D Gimeno-Traver	6	6
