= 2009 Copa Sevilla – Singles =

Singles
- 2009 Copa Sevilla

Final
- Champion: (Spain) Pere Riba
- Runner-up: (Spain) Albert Ramos-Viñolas
- Score: 7–6(2), 6–2

Events
Singles	Doubles
← 2008 ·	Copa Sevilla	· 2010 →

5th-seeded Pere Riba successfully defended his 2008 title, winning 7–6(2), 6–2, against qualifier Albert Ramos-Viñolas.

== Seeds ==
1. (Spain) Daniel Gimeno-Traver (quarterfinals)
2. (Spain) Rubén Ramírez Hidalgo (first round)
3. (Spain) Santiago Ventura (semifinals)
4. (Spain) Iván Navarro (first round)
5. (Spain) Pere Riba (champion)
6. (Spain) Pablo Andújar (first round)
7. (Brazil) Júlio Silva (semifinals)
8. (United Kingdom) James Ward (second round)

== Draw ==
=== Key ===
- Q = Qualifier
- WC = Wild card
- LL = Lucky loser
- Alt = Alternate
- ITF = ITF entry
- PR = Protected ranking
- SR = Special ranking
- SE = Special exempt
- JE = Junior exempt
- JR = Junior Accelerator Programme entrant
- CO = College Accelerator Programme entrant
- NG = Next Gen Accelerator Program entrant
- w/o = Walkover
- r = Retired
- d = Defaulted

=== Final four ===
Semifinals
5	(Spain) Pere Riba	7	1	6
3	(Spain) Santiago Ventura	6^{0}	6	3
7	(Brazil) Júlio Silva	2	7	3
Q	(Spain) Albert Ramos-Viñolas	6	6^{3}	6

Final
5	(Spain) Pere Riba	7	6
Q	(Spain) Albert Ramos-Viñolas	6^{2}	2

=== Top half ===
First round
1	(Spain) D Gimeno-Traver	6	6
(Brazil) R Dutra da Silva	1	3
(Denmark) K Pless	6^{5}	2
Q	(Spain) G Olaso	7	6
(Spain) D Marrero	6	3	6
WC	(Spain) C Boluda-Purkiss	3	6	2
(Spain) C Poch-Gradin	3	0	r
5	(Spain) P Riba	6	3
3	(Spain) S Ventura	6	7
(Germany) A Flock	2	5
(Spain) J Checa-Calvo	4	4
Q	(Spain) G Trujillo-Soler	6	6
(Italy) S Vagnozzi	7	6
(Russia) V Rudnev	6^{5}	1
WC	(Spain) S Diez	2	6^{3}
8	(United Kingdom) J Ward	6	7

Second round
1	(Spain) D Gimeno-Traver	6	6
Q	(Spain) G Olaso	3	4
(Spain) D Marrero	4	3
5	(Spain) P Riba	6	6
3	(Spain) S Ventura	6	7
Q	(Spain) G Trujillo-Soler	3	6^{3}
(Italy) S Vagnozzi	6	7
8	(United Kingdom) J Ward	2	6^{1}

Quarterfinals
1	(Spain) D Gimeno-Traver	6	4	1
5	(Spain) P Riba	1	6	6
3	(Spain) S Ventura	7	6
(Italy) S Vagnozzi	5	1

Semifinals
5	(Spain) P Riba	7	1	6
3	(Spain) S Ventura	6^{0}	6	3

=== Bottom half ===
First round
7	(Brazil) J Silva	6	6
WC	(Spain) A Rodríguez-Cervantes	3	2
(Poland) J Janowicz	6	7
Q	(Italy) E Burzi	4	6^{5}
(Spain) I Cervantes-Huegun	4	7	3
(Spain) MÁ López Jaén	6	5	6
(Spain) P Santos	6	7
4	(Spain) I Navarro	4	6^{1}
6	(Spain) P Andújar	4	6^{3}
Q	(Spain) A Ramos-Viñolas	6	7
(Germany) T Kamke	4	3
(Italy) A Brizzi	6	6
(Germany) S Stadler	6^{3}	6^{3}
WC	(Spain) A Boje-Ordóñez	7	7
(Slovakia) P Červenák	6	6
2	(Spain) R Ramírez Hidalgo	4	1

Second round
7	(Brazil) J Silva	7	6
(Poland) J Janowicz	6^{1}	2
(Spain) MÁ López Jaén	3	2
(Spain) P Santos	6	6
Q	(Spain) A Ramos-Viñolas	6	6
(Italy) A Brizzi	3	2
WC	(Spain) A Boje-Ordóñez	6
(Slovakia) P Červenák	5	r

Quarterfinals
7	(Brazil) J Silva	7	4	6
(Spain) P Santos	6^{6}	6	2
Q	(Spain) A Ramos-Viñolas	6	6
WC	(Spain) A Boje-Ordóñez	4	4

Semifinals
7	(Brazil) J Silva	2	7	3
Q	(Spain) A Ramos-Viñolas	6	6^{4}	6
