= 2013 Copa Sevilla =

Professional tennis tournament in Spain

- Date: 9–15 September
- Edition: 16th
- Surface: Clay
- Location: Seville, Spain

Champions

Singles
- (Spain) Daniel Gimeno Traver

Doubles
- (Italy) Alessandro Motti / (France) Stéphane Robert
← 2012 ·	Copa Sevilla	· 2014 →

The 2013 Copa Sevilla was a professional tennis tournament played on clay courts. It was the 16th edition of the tournament which was part of the 2013 ATP Challenger Tour. It took place in Seville, Spain between 9 and 15 September 2013.

== Singles main draw entrants ==
=== Seeds ===
Country	Player	Rank^{1}	Seed
ESP	Daniel Gimeno Traver	61	1
ESP	Albert Ramos	75	2
RUS	Andrey Kuznetsov	83	3
FRA	Stéphane Robert	150	4
ESP	Pere Riba	156	5
ARG	Renzo Olivo	197	6
FRA	Maxime Teixeira	210	7
ESP	Roberto Carballés Baena	230	8

- ^{1} Rankings are as of August 26, 2013.

=== Other entrants ===
The following players received wildcards into the singles main draw:

- (Spain) Agustín Boje-Ordóñez
- (Spain) Sergio Gutiérrez Ferrol
- (Spain) Ricardo Ojeda Lara
- (Spain) Roberto Ortega-Olmedo

The following player received entry as an alternate into the singles main draw:

- (Spain) Carlos Gómez-Herrera

The following players used a protected ranking to receive entry into the singles main draw:

- (Spain) Óscar Hernández

The following players received entry from the qualifying draw:

- (Spain) David Pérez Sanz
- (Italy) Enrico Burzi
- (Czech Republic) Michal Schmid
- (Netherlands) Miliaan Niesten

== Champions ==
=== Singles ===
- (Spain) Daniel Gimeno Traver def. (France) Stéphane Robert 6–4, 7–6^{(7–2)}

=== Doubles ===
- (Italy) Alessandro Motti / (France) Stéphane Robert def. (Netherlands) Stephan Fransen / (Netherlands) Wesley Koolhof 7–5, 7–5
