= 2017 Copa Sevilla – Singles =

Singles
- 2017 Copa Sevilla

Final
- Champion: (Canada) Félix Auger-Aliassime
- Runner-up: (Spain) Íñigo Cervantes
- Score: 6–7^{(4–7)}, 6–3, 6–3

Events
| Singles | Doubles |
- Copa Sevilla

Casper Ruud was the defending champion but retired in the first round facing Íñigo Cervantes.

Félix Auger-Aliassime won the title after defeating Cervantes 6–7^{(4–7)}, 6–3, 6–3 in the final.

== Seeds ==
1. (Spain) Nicolás Almagro (first round)
2. (Spain) Roberto Carballés Baena (quarterfinals)
3. (Norway) Casper Ruud (first round, retired)
4. (Japan) Taro Daniel (quarterfinals)
5. (Serbia) Filip Krajinović (semifinals)
6. (Czech Republic) Adam Pavlásek (second round)
7. (Spain) Adrián Menéndez-Maceiras (withdrew)
8. (Portugal) Gastão Elias (first round)

== Draw ==
Key

- Q = Qualifier
- WC = Wild card
- LL = Lucky loser
- Alt = Alternate
- ITF = ITF entry
- PR = Protected ranking
- SR = Special ranking
- SE = Special exempt
- JE = Junior exempt
- JR = Junior Accelerator Programme entrant
- CO = College Accelerator Programme entrant
- NG = Next Gen Accelerator Program entrant
- w/o = Walkover
- r = Retired
- d = Defaulted

=== Finals ===
Semifinals
SE | (France) Corentin Moutet | 2 | 2
(Spain) Íñigo Cervantes | 6 | 6
(Canada) Félix Auger-Aliassime | 3 | 7^{7} | 6
5 | (Serbia) Filip Krajinović | 6 | 6^{4} | 3

Final
(Spain) Íñigo Cervantes | 7^{7} | 3 | 3
(Canada) Félix Auger-Aliassime | 6^{4} | 6 | 6

=== Top half ===
First round
1/WC | (Spain) N Almagro | 6^{2} | 2
(Croatia) V Galović | 7^{7} | 6
Q | (Spain) C Gómez-Herrera | 6 | 6
(Spain) P Martínez | 4 | 2
(Portugal) J Domingues | 3 | 1
SE | (France) C Moutet | 6 | 6
Q | (France) Maxime Tabatruong | 4 | 4
LL | (France) A Michon | 6 | 6
3 | (Norway) C Ruud | 4 | 0^{r}
(Spain) Í Cervantes | 6 | 3
(Spain) R Ojeda Lara | 4 | 6 | 6
WC | (Spain) J Barranco Cosano | 6 | 4 | 2
Q | (Spain) Marc Giner | 5 | 3
(Portugal) G Oliveira | 7 | 6
(Spain) J Munar | 6 | 6
8 | (Portugal) G Elias | 4 | 4

Second round
(Croatia) V Galović | 4 | 4
Q | (Spain) C Gómez-Herrera | 6 | 6
SE | (France) C Moutet | 4 | 7^{7} | 7
LL | (France) A Michon | 6 | 6^{2} | 5
(Spain) Í Cervantes | 6 | 6
(Spain) R Ojeda Lara | 2 | 3
(Portugal) G Oliveira | 6 | 6^{7} | 3^{r}
(Spain) J Munar | 4 | 7^{9} | 2

Quarterfinals
Q | (Spain) C Gómez-Herrera | 3 | 3
SE | (France) C Moutet | 6 | 6
(Spain) Í Cervantes | 7 | 3 | 6
(Spain) J Munar | 5 | 6 | 2

Semifinals
SE | (France) C Moutet | 2 | 2
(Spain) Í Cervantes | 6 | 6

=== Bottom half ===
First round
6 | (Czech Republic) A Pavlásek | 6^{2} | 6 | 6
Q | (Spain) M Vilella Martínez | 7^{7} | 2 | 1
(Canada) F Auger-Aliassime | 6 | 5 | 7^{7}
(France) M Janvier | 2 | 7 | 6^{3}
(Russia) T Gabashvili | 6 | 6^{5} | 6^{4}
WC | (Spain) D Gimeno Traver | 3 | 7^{7} | 7^{7}
(Spain) C Taberner | 1 | 7 | 4
4 | (Japan) T Daniel | 6 | 5 | 6
5 | (Serbia) F Krajinović | 6 | 6
(Slovenia) B Rola | 4 | 2
WC | (Spain) A Davidovich Fokina | 6 | 6
(Argentina) P Cachin | 4 | 4
(Lithuania) L Grigelis | 3 | 2
(Spain) B Zapata Miralles | 6 | 6
(Czech Republic) Marek Jaloviec | 0 | 6 | 0
2 | (Spain) R Carballés Baena | 6 | 2 | 6

Second round
6 | (Czech Republic) A Pavlásek | 1 | 6^{3}
(Canada) F Auger-Aliassime | 6 | 7^{7}
WC | (Spain) D Gimeno Traver | 5 | 2^{r}
4 | (Japan) T Daniel | 7 | 0
5 | (Serbia) F Krajinović | 6 | 6
WC | (Spain) A Davidovich Fokina | 4 | 3
(Spain) B Zapata Miralles | 3 | 1
2 | (Spain) R Carballés Baena | 6 | 6

Quarterfinals
(Canada) F Auger-Aliassime | 6 | 6
4 | (Japan) T Daniel | 1 | 0
5 | (Serbia) F Krajinović | 6 | 6
2 | (Spain) R Carballés Baena | 4 | 4

Semifinals
(Canada) F Auger-Aliassime | 3 | 7^{7} | 6
5 | (Serbia) F Krajinović | 6 | 6^{4} | 3
