= 2009 Copa Sevilla – Doubles =

Doubles
- 2009 Copa Sevilla

Final
- Champions: (Philippines) Treat Conrad Huey; (India) Harsh Mankad
- Runners-up: (Italy) Alberto Brizzi; (Italy) Simone Vagnozzi
- Score: 6–1, 7–5

Events
Singles	Doubles
- Copa Sevilla

David Marrero and Pablo Santos were the defending champions of the Copa Sevilla men's doubles tennis tournament. They chose to compete this year, but were eliminated by Enrico Burzi and Pavol Červenák already in the first round.
Treat Conrad Huey and Harsh Mankad defeated Alberto Brizzi and Simone Vagnozzi 6–1, 7–5 in the final and won €2,650 in prize money and 80 ranking points.

== Seeds ==
1. (Spain) Rubén Ramírez Hidalgo / (Spain) Santiago Ventura (semifinals)
2. (Spain) David Marrero / (Spain) Pablo Santos (first round)
3. (Brazil) Rogério Dutra da Silva / (Brazil) Júlio Silva (quarterfinals)
4. (Spain) Miguel Ángel López Jaén / (Spain) Iván Navarro (first round)

== Draw ==
Key

- Q = Qualifier
- WC = Wild card
- LL = Lucky loser
- Alt = Alternate
- ITF = ITF entry
- PR = Protected ranking
- SR = Special ranking
- SE = Special exempt
- JE = Junior exempt
- JR = Junior Accelerator Programme entrant
- CO = College Accelerator Programme entrant
- NG = Next Gen Accelerator Program entrant
- w/o = Walkover
- r = Retired
- d = Defaulted

=== Draw ===
First round

Quarterfinals

Semifinals

Finals

1
- (Spain) R Ramírez Hidalgo
- (Spain) S Ventura
6
4
[11]

- (Spain) I Cervantes Huegun
- (Spain) G Olaso
2
6
[9]

1
- (Spain) R Ramírez Hidalgo
- (Spain) S Ventura
6
7

WC
(Spain) J Beaus-Barquin
(Spain) A Rodríguez-Cervantes
4
4

- (Spain) S Gutiérrez Ferrol
- (Spain) A Ramos Viñolas
3
6^{1}

- (Spain) S Gutiérrez Ferrol
- (Spain) A Ramos Viñolas
6
6

1
- (Spain) R Ramírez Hidalgo
- (Spain) S Ventura
2
3

4
- (Spain) MÁ López Jaén
- (Spain) I Navarro
2
4

- (Philippines) TC Huey
- (India) H Mankad
6
6

- (Spain) J Checa Calvo
- (Spain) G Trujillo Soler
6
6

- (Spain) J Checa Calvo
- (Spain) G Trujillo Soler
6^{5}
5

- (Spain) A Vivanco-Guzmán
- (United Kingdom) J Ward
w/o

- (Philippines) TC Huey
- (India) H Mankad
7
7

- (Philippines) TC Huey
- (India) H Mankad

- (Philippines) TC Huey
- (India) H Mankad
6
7

(Spain) D Gimeno Traver
(United Kingdom) M Phillips
6
6

- (Italy) A Brizzi
- (Italy) S Vagnozzi
1
5

WC
(Spain) M Fornell-Mestres
(Russia) E Prokhorenko
3
2

(Spain) D Gimeno Traver
(United Kingdom) M Phillips
6
6

- (Spain) I Coll-Riudavets
- (Russia) N Nesterov
1
4

3
- (Brazil) R Dutra da Silva
- (Brazil) J Silva
4
3

3
- (Brazil) R Dutra da Silva
- (Brazil) J Silva
6
6

(Spain) D Gimeno Traver
(United Kingdom) M Phillips
4
6
[6]

WC
- (Spain) A Boje-Ordóñez
- (Spain) P Martín-Adalia
6
4
[7]

- (Italy) A Brizzi
- (Italy) S Vagnozzi
6
4
[10]

- (Italy) A Brizzi
- (Italy) S Vagnozzi
3
6
[10]

- (Italy) A Brizzi
- (Italy) S Vagnozzi
6
6

- (Italy) Enrico Burzi
- (Slovakia) P Červenák
6
6

- (Italy) E Burzi
- (Slovakia) P Červenák
2
4

2
- (Spain) D Marrero
- (Spain) P Santos
3
1
