= 2022 Copa Sevilla – Singles =

Singles
- 2022 Copa Sevilla

Final
- Champion: (Spain) Roberto Carballés Baena
- Runner-up: (Spain) Bernabé Zapata Miralles
- Score: 6–3, 7–6^{(8–6)}

Events
Singles	Doubles
← 2021 ·	Copa Sevilla	· 2023 →

Pedro Martínez was the defending champion but lost in the first round to Kimmer Coppejans.

Roberto Carballés Baena won the title after defeating Bernabé Zapata Miralles 6–3, 7–6^{(8–6)} in the final.

== Seeds ==
1. (Spain) Pedro Martínez (first round)
2. (Spain) Bernabé Zapata Miralles (final)
3. (Spain) Roberto Carballés Baena (champion)
4. (Spain) Carlos Taberner (second round)
5. (Italy) Franco Agamenone (first round)
6. (Argentina) Federico Delbonis (quarterfinals)
7. (France) Alexandre Müller (first round)
8. (Argentina) Marco Trungelliti (first round)

== Draw ==
=== Key ===
- Q = Qualifier
- WC = Wild card
- LL = Lucky loser
- Alt = Alternate
- SE = Special exempt
- PR = Protected ranking
- ITF = ITF entry
- JE = Junior exempt
- w/o = Walkover
- r = Retired
- d = Defaulted
- SR = Special ranking

=== Finals ===
Semifinals
(Argentina) Facundo Díaz Acosta	1	1
3	(Spain) Roberto Carballés Baena	6	6
Alt	(Kazakhstan) Timofey Skatov	2	1
2	(Spain) Bernabé Zapata Miralles	6	6

Final
3	(Spain) Roberto Carballés Baena	6	7^{8}
2	(Spain) Bernabé Zapata Miralles	3	6^{6}

=== Top half ===
First round
1	(Spain) P Martínez	4	7^{7}	2
SE	(Belgium) K Coppejans	6	6^{4}	6
Q	(Spain) D Mérida	6^{5}	7^{7}	6
WC	(Spain) Carlos López Montagud	7^{7}	6^{1}	3
Alt	(Italy) L Giustino	6^{5}	6	1
(Argentina) F Díaz Acosta	7^{7}	4	6
Q	(Norway) V Durasovic	7	3	6
7	(France) A Müller	5	6	2
3	(Spain) R Carballés Baena	6	6^{5}	6
(Serbia) M Zekić	4	7^{7}	1
(Finland) O Virtanen	2	2
Q	B Bobrov	6	6
(Spain) N Sánchez Izquierdo	4	6	6
(Italy) GM Moroni	6	2	4
Q	(United States) N Moreno de Alboran	5	7^{8}	0^{d}
6	(Argentina) F Delbonis	7	6^{6}	0

Second round
SE	(Belgium) K Coppejans	2	6	7^{7}
Q	(Spain) D Mérida	6	2	6^{4}
(Argentina) F Díaz Acosta	6	6
Q	(Norway) V Durasovic	4	4
3	(Spain) R Carballés Baena	6	6
Q	B Bobrov	3	3
(Spain) N Sánchez Izquierdo	3	2
6	(Argentina) F Delbonis	6	6

Quarterfinals
SE	(Belgium) K Coppejans	6^{6}	6	2
(Argentina) F Díaz Acosta	7^{8}	3	6
3	(Spain) R Carballés Baena	6	6
6	(Argentina) F Delbonis	1	2

Semifinals
(Argentina) F Díaz Acosta	1	1
3	(Spain) R Carballés Baena	6	6

=== Bottom half ===
First round
8	(Argentina) M Trungelliti	6	3	4
WC	(Spain) J Barranco Cosano	4	6	6
Alt	(Kazakhstan) T Skatov	6	6
(Italy) R Brancaccio	4	4
WC	(Poland) J Janowicz	7^{8}	6
Alt	(Portugal) F Ferreira Silva	6^{6}	1
Q	(Romania) FC Jianu	2	3
4	(Spain) C Taberner	6	6
5	(Italy) F Agamenone	3	3
(Hungary) F Marozsán	6	6
(Spain) N Álvarez Varona	2	6^{6}
(Italy) R Bonadio	6	7^{8}
Q	(Italy) G Fonio	6	6
(Czech Republic) D Svrčina	3	1
(Croatia) N Serdarušić	2	4
2	(Spain) B Zapata Miralles	6	6

Second round
WC	(Spain) J Barranco Cosano	2	2^{r}
Alt	(Kazakhstan) T Skatov	6	3
WC	(Poland) J Janowicz	1	6	7^{10}
4	(Spain) C Taberner	6	4	6^{8}
(Hungary) F Marozsán	6	2	6
(Italy) R Bonadio	3	6	2
Q	(Italy) G Fonio	6^{4}	4
2	(Spain) B Zapata Miralles	7^{7}	6

Quarterfinals
Alt	(Kazakhstan) T Skatov	6	6
WC	(Poland) J Janowicz	3	2
(Hungary) F Marozsán	3	2
2	(Spain) B Zapata Miralles	6	6

Semifinals
Alt	(Kazakhstan) T Skatov	2	1
2	(Spain) B Zapata Miralles	6	6
