= 2016 Copa Sevilla – Doubles =

Doubles
- 2016 Copa Sevilla

Final
- Champions: (Spain) Íñigo Cervantes; (Spain) Oriol Roca Batalla
- Runners-up: (Uruguay) Ariel Behar; (Spain) Enrique López Pérez
- Score: 6–2, 6–5 ret.

Events
Singles	Doubles
← 2015 ·	Copa Sevilla	· 2017 →

Wesley Koolhof and Matwé Middelkoop were the defending champions but chose not to defend their title.

Íñigo Cervantes and Oriol Roca Batalla won the title after Ariel Behar and Enrique López Pérez retired while trailing 2–6, 5–6.

== Seeds ==
1. (Uruguay) Ariel Behar / (Spain) Enrique López Pérez (final, retired)
2. (Spain) Íñigo Cervantes / (Spain) Oriol Roca Batalla (champions)
3. (Spain) David Vega Hernández / (Serbia) Ilija Vučić (semifinals)
4. (Venezuela) Jordi Muñoz Abreu / (Spain) David Pérez Sanz (semifinals)

== Draw ==
=== Key ===
- Q = Qualifier
- WC = Wild card
- LL = Lucky loser
- Alt = Alternate
- SE = Special exempt
- PR = Protected ranking
- ITF = ITF entry
- JE = Junior exempt
- w/o = Walkover
- r = Retired
- d = Defaulted
- SR = Special ranking

First round

Quarterfinals

Semifinals

Final

1
- (Uruguay) A Behar
- (Spain) E López Pérez
6
6

- (Poland) K Majchrzak
- (Czech Republic) J Mertl
3
2

1
- (Uruguay) A Behar
- (Spain) E López Pérez
6
6

- (Turkey) T Altuna
- (Serbia) M Tepavac
7^{7}
6^{2}
[1]

- (Slovakia) A Martin
- (France) A Michon
3
2

- (Slovakia) A Martin
- (France) A Michon
6^{4}
7^{7}
[10]

1
- (Uruguay) A Behar
- (Spain) E López Pérez
6
6^{4}
[10]

3
(Spain) D Vega Hernández
(Serbia) Ilija Vučić
6
7

3
(Spain) D Vega Hernández
(Serbia) I Vučić
1
7^{7}
[2]

Alt
- (Spain) P Toledo Bagué
- (Russia) A Zhurbin
2
5

3
(Spain) D Vega Hernández
(Serbia) I Vučić
6
4
[10]

(Chile) C Garín
(Chile) Bastián Malla
6
6

(Chile) C Garín
(Chile) B Malla
4
6
[5]

WC
(Brazil) Rafael Camilo
(Brazil) E Russi Assumpção
4
4

1
- (Uruguay) A Behar
- (Spain) E López Pérez
2
5^{r}

WC
(Spain) Iván Marrero Curbelo
(Spain) Iouri Sant Syromolotov Netrebin
5
1

2
- (Spain) Í Cervantes
- (Spain) O Roca Batalla
6
6

- (Italy) L Giustino
- (Argentina) T Lipovšek Puches
7
6

- (Italy) L Giustino
- (Argentina) T Lipovšek Puches
0
6
[7]

- (Australia) C O'Connell
- (Japan) A Santillan
5
7
[6]

4
- (Venezuela) J Muñoz Abreu
- (Spain) D Pérez Sanz
6
1
[10]

4
- (Venezuela) J Muñoz Abreu
- (Spain) D Pérez Sanz
7
5
[10]

4
- (Venezuela) J Muñoz Abreu
- (Spain) D Pérez Sanz
3
6
[8]

WC
- (Spain) Agustín Boje-Ordóñez
- (Spain) R Ortega Olmedo
3
1

2
- (Spain) Í Cervantes
- (Spain) O Roca Batalla
6
3
[10]

- (Spain) P Martínez
- (Norway) C Ruud
6
6

- (Spain) P Martínez
- (Norway) C Ruud
5
5

- (Argentina) P Cachin
- (Brazil) F de Paula
6
5
[7]

2
- (Spain) Í Cervantes
- (Spain) O Roca Batalla
7
7

2
- (Spain) Í Cervantes
- (Spain) O Roca Batalla
3
7
[10]
