= 2022 Copa Sevilla – Doubles =

Doubles
- 2022 Copa Sevilla

Final
- Champions: (Argentina) Román Andrés Burruchaga (Argentina) Facundo Díaz Acosta
- Runners-up: (Spain) Nicolás Álvarez Varona (Spain) Alberto Barroso Campos
- Score: 7–5, 6–7^{(8–10)}, [10–7]

Events
| Singles | Doubles |
- Copa Sevilla

David Vega Hernández and Mark Vervoort were the defending champions but chose not to defend their title.

Román Andrés Burruchaga and Facundo Díaz Acosta won the title after defeating Nicolás Álvarez Varona and Alberto Barroso Campos 7–5, 6–7^{(8–10)}, [10–7] in the final.

== Seeds ==
1. (Venezuela) Luis David Martínez / (Colombia) Cristian Rodríguez (first round)
2. (Germany) Fabian Fallert / (Netherlands) Bart Stevens (semifinals)
3. (Poland) Karol Drzewiecki / (Finland) Patrik Niklas-Salminen (first round)
4. (Bolivia) Boris Arias / (Bolivia) Federico Zeballos (first round)

== Draw ==
Key

- Q = Qualifier
- WC = Wild card
- LL = Lucky loser
- Alt = Alternate
- ITF = ITF entry
- PR = Protected ranking
- SR = Special ranking
- SE = Special exempt
- JE = Junior exempt
- JR = Junior Accelerator Programme entrant
- CO = College Accelerator Programme entrant
- NG = Next Gen Accelerator Program entrant
- w/o = Walkover
- r = Retired
- d = Defaulted

First round
1 | (Venezuela) LD Martínez (Colombia) C Rodríguez | 6^{3} | 6 | [7]
(Spain) A Menéndez Maceiras (Serbia) M Zekić | 7^{7} | 2 | [10]
(Italy) R Bonadio (Italy) G Fonio | 6 | 6
WC | (Spain) J Barranco Cosano (Spain) B Winter López | 3 | 4
3 | (Poland) K Drzewiecki (Finland) P Niklas-Salminen | 4 | 6^{7}
(Norway) V Durasovic (Finland) O Virtanen | 6 | 7^{9}
(Argentina) RA Burruchaga (Argentina) F Díaz Acosta | 6 | 6
WC | (United States) Jack Vance (United States) Tennyson Whiting | 1 | 3
(Argentina) Juan Ignacio Galarza (Slovenia) T Lipovšek Puches | 7^{7} | 1 | [1]
(Italy) R Brancaccio (Spain) S Martos Gornés | 6^{4} | 6 | [10]
(Spain) N Álvarez Varona (Spain) A Barroso Campos | 6 | 3 | [10]
4 | (Bolivia) B Arias (Bolivia) F Zeballos | 3 | 6 | [2]
Andrey Chepelev (Romania) A Jecan | 5 | 3
(France) U Blanchet (France) L Sanchez | 7 | 6
(Spain) Í Cervantes (Spain) O Roca Batalla | 4 | 0
2 | (Germany) F Fallert (Netherlands) B Stevens | 6 | 6

Quarterfinals
(Spain) A Menéndez Maceiras (Serbia) M Zekić | 6 | 6
(Italy) R Bonadio (Italy) G Fonio | 2 | 3
(Norway) V Durasovic (Finland) O Virtanen | 7^{7} | 4 | [8]
(Argentina) RA Burruchaga (Argentina) F Díaz Acosta | 6^{4} | 6 | [10]
(Italy) R Brancaccio (Spain) S Martos Gornés | 3 | 4
(Spain) N Álvarez Varona (Spain) A Barroso Campos | 6 | 6
(France) U Blanchet (France) L Sanchez | 6^{6} | 5
2 | (Germany) F Fallert (Netherlands) B Stevens | 7^{8} | 7

Semifinals
(Spain) A Menéndez Maceiras (Serbia) M Zekić | 1 | 7^{7} | [8]
(Argentina) RA Burruchaga (Argentina) F Díaz Acosta | 6 | 6^{5} | [10]
(Spain) N Álvarez Varona (Spain) A Barroso Campos | 6^{7} | 6 | [10]
2 | (Germany) F Fallert (Netherlands) B Stevens | 7^{9} | 4 | [7]

Final
(Argentina) RA Burruchaga (Argentina) F Díaz Acosta | 7 | 6^{8} | [10]
(Spain) N Álvarez Varona (Spain) A Barroso Campos | 5 | 7^{10} | [7]
