= 2016 Copa Sevilla =

- Date: 5–10 September
- Edition: 19th
- Surface: Clay
- Location: Seville, Spain

Champions

Singles
- (Norway) Casper Ruud

Doubles
- (Spain) Íñigo Cervantes / (Spain) Oriol Roca Batalla
← 2015 ·	Copa Sevilla	· 2017 →

The 2016 Copa Sevilla was a professional tennis tournament played on clay courts. It was the 19th edition of the tournament which was part of the 2016 ATP Challenger Tour. It took place in Seville, Spain between 5 and 10 September 2016.

== Singles main-draw entrants ==
=== Seeds ===
Country	Player	Rank^{1}	Seed
ESP	Íñigo Cervantes	75	1
AUT	Gerald Melzer	88	2
JPN	Taro Daniel	101	3
ESP	Daniel Gimeno Traver	118	4
SVK	Andrej Martin	124	5
BEL	Arthur De Greef	138	6
ESP	Rubén Ramírez Hidalgo	148	7
ESP	Enrique López Pérez	177	8

- ^{1} Rankings are as of August 29, 2016.

=== Other entrants ===
The following players received wildcards into the singles main draw:

- (Spain) Pedro Martínez
- (Spain) Ricardo Ojeda Lara
- (Spain) Carlos Taberner
- (Spain) Pablo Andújar

The following player received entry into the singles main draw with a protected ranking:

- (Brazil) Fabiano de Paula

The following players received entry from the qualifying draw:

- (Spain) Pol Toledo Bagué
- (Australia) Christopher O'Connell
- (Chile) Bastián Malla
- (Norway) Casper Ruud

The following player entered as a lucky loser:

- (Spain) Roberto Ortega-Olmedo

== Champions ==
=== Singles ===
- (Norway) Casper Ruud def. (Japan) Taro Daniel, 6–3, 6–4.

=== Doubles ===
- (Spain) Íñigo Cervantes / (Spain) Oriol Roca Batalla def. (Uruguay) Ariel Behar / (Spain) Enrique López Pérez, 6–2, 6–5 RET.
