= 2017 Copa Sevilla =

- Date: 4–9 September
- Edition: 20th
- Surface: Yellow clay
- Location: Seville, Spain

Champions

Singles
- (Canada) Félix Auger-Aliassime

Doubles
- (Argentina) Pedro Cachin / (Spain) Íñigo Cervantes
← 2016 ·	Copa Sevilla	· 2018 →

The 2017 Copa Sevilla was a professional tennis tournament played on clay courts. It was the 20th edition of the tournament which was part of the 2017 ATP Challenger Tour. It took place in Seville, Spain between 4 and 9 September 2017.

== Singles main-draw entrants ==
=== Seeds ===
Country	Player	Rank^{1}	Seed
ESP	Nicolás Almagro	92	1
ESP	Roberto Carballés Baena	109	2
NOR	Casper Ruud	112	3
JPN	Taro Daniel	121	4
SRB	Filip Krajinović	126	5
CZE	Adam Pavlásek	131	6
~~ESP~~	~~Adrián Menéndez Maceiras~~	~~148~~	~~7~~
POR	Gastão Elias	153	8

- ^{1} Rankings are as of 28 August 2017.

=== Other entrants ===
The following players received wildcards into the singles main draw:

- (Spain) Nicolás Almagro
- (Spain) Javier Barranco Cosano
- (Spain) Alejandro Davidovich Fokina
- (Spain) Daniel Gimeno Traver

The following player received entry into the singles main draw as a special exempt:

- (France) Corentin Moutet

The following players received entry from the qualifying draw:

- (Spain) Marc Giner
- (Spain) Carlos Gómez-Herrera
- (France) Maxime Tabatruong
- (Spain) Mario Vilella Martínez

The following player received entry as a lucky loser:

- (France) Axel Michon

== Champions ==
=== Singles ===
- (Canada) Félix Auger-Aliassime def. (Spain) Íñigo Cervantes 6–7^{(4–7)}, 6–3, 6–3.

=== Doubles ===
- (Argentina) Pedro Cachin / (Spain) Íñigo Cervantes def. (Russia) Ivan Gakhov / (Spain) David Vega Hernández 7–6^{(7–5)}, 3–6, [10–5].
