= 2015 Copa Sevilla – Doubles =

Doubles
- 2015 Copa Sevilla

Final
- Champions: (Netherlands) Wesley Koolhof (Netherlands) Matwé Middelkoop
- Runners-up: (Italy) Marco Bortolotti (Poland) Kamil Majchrzak
- Score: 7–6^{(7–5)}, 6–4

Events
Singles	Doubles
← 2014 ·	Copa Sevilla	· 2016 →

Antal van der Duim and Boy Westerhof were the defending champions but chose not to defend their title.

Wesley Koolhof and Matwé Middelkoop won the title, beating Marco Bortolotti and Kamil Majchrzak 7–6^{(7–5)}, 6–4

== Seeds ==
1. (Netherlands) Wesley Koolhof / (Netherlands) Matwé Middelkoop (champions)
2. (Serbia) Ilija Bozoljac / (Italy) Flavio Cipolla (first round)
3. (Uruguay) Ariel Behar / (Philippines) Ruben Gonzales (first round)
4. (Croatia) Ivan Sabanov / (Croatia) Matej Sabanov (first round)

== Draw ==
=== Key ===
- Q = Qualifier
- WC = Wild card
- LL = Lucky loser
- Alt = Alternate
- SE = Special exempt
- PR = Protected ranking
- ITF = ITF entry
- JE = Junior exempt
- w/o = Walkover
- r = Retired
- d = Defaulted
- SR = Special ranking

First round
1	(Netherlands) W Koolhof (Netherlands) M Middelkoop	4	6	[10]
(Slovakia) J Kovalík (Czech Republic) J Mertl	6	3	[4]
(Spain) D Gimeno-Traver (Spain) R Ramírez Hidalgo	4	2
(Argentina) R Olivo (Brazil) F Romboli	6	6
3	(Uruguay) A Behar (Philippines) R Gonzales	6	3	[14]
(Spain) P Riba (Spain) J Samper-Montaña	3	6	[16]
(Spain) Í Cervantes (Spain) J Lizariturry	6	4	[7]
WC	(Argentina) P Cachin (Spain) J Munar	4	6	[10]
(Italy) M Bortolotti (Poland) K Majchrzak	6	6
(Spain) Pedro Dominguez Alonso (Spain) Juan Jose Leal-Gomez	4	1
(France) A Michon (France) M Teixeira	6	3	[10]
4	(Croatia) I Sabanov (Croatia) M Sabanov	4	6	[5]
(Serbia) Ilija Vučić (Serbia) M Zekić	6	2	[10]
WC	(Spain) P Carreño (Spain) Eduard Esteve Lobato	3	6	[4]
WC	(Spain) R Ortega-Olmedo (Spain) D Vega Hernández	6	7
2	(Serbia) I Bozoljac (Italy) F Cipolla	3	5

Quarterfinals
1	(Netherlands) W Koolhof (Netherlands) M Middelkoop	6	6
(Argentina) R Olivo (Brazil) F Romboli	4	2
(Spain) P Riba (Spain) J Samper-Montaña	6	6^{5}	[8]
WC	(Argentina) P Cachin (Spain) J Munar	4	7^{7}	[10]
(Italy) M Bortolotti (Poland) K Majchrzak	7	7
(France) A Michon (France) M Teixeira	5	5
(Serbia) I Vučić (Serbia) M Zekić	4	7^{8}	[11]
WC	(Spain) R Ortega-Olmedo (Spain) D Vega Hernandez	6	6^{6}	[9]

Semifinals
1	(Netherlands) W Koolhof (Netherlands) M Middelkoop	7^{7}	6
WC	(Argentina) P Cachin (Spain) J Munar	6^{2}	3
(Italy) M Bortolotti (Poland) K Majchrzak	6	6
(Serbia) I Vučić (Serbia) M Zekić	4	2

Final
1	(Netherlands) W Koolhof (Netherlands) M Middelkoop	7^{7}	6
(Italy) M Bortolotti (Poland) K Majchrzak	6^{5}	4
