= 2014 Copa Sevilla =

- Date: 8–13 September
- Edition: 17th
- Surface: Clay
- Location: Seville, Spain

Champions

Singles
- (Spain) Pablo Carreño

Doubles
- (Netherlands) Antal van der Duim / (Netherlands) Boy Westerhof
← 2013 ·	Copa Sevilla	· 2015 →

The 2014 Copa Sevilla was a professional tennis tournament played on clay courts. It was the 17th edition of the tournament which was part of the 2014 ATP Challenger Tour. It took place in Seville, Spain, between 8 and 13 September 2014.

== Singles main-draw entrants ==
=== Seeds ===
Country	Player	Rank^{1}	Seed
ESP	Pablo Carreño	74	1
ESP	Daniel Gimeno Traver	101	2
FRA	Pierre-Hugues Herbert	136	3
AUT	Gerald Melzer	145	4
ESP	Adrián Menéndez Maceiras	159	5
JPN	Taro Daniel	186	6
ESP	Roberto Carballés Baena	212	7
ITA	Flavio Cipolla	225	8

- ^{1} Rankings are as of September 1, 2014.

=== Other entrants ===
The following players received wildcards into the singles main draw:

- (Spain) Agustin Boje-Ordonez
- (Spain) Pedro Dominguez Alonso
- (Spain) Ricardo Ojeda Lara
- (Spain) David Vega Hernandez

The following players received entry from the qualifying draw:

- (Portugal) Frederico Gil
- (Spain) Albert Alcaraz Ivorra
- (Spain) Eduard Esteve Lobato
- (Czech Republic) Michal Schmid

== Champions ==
=== Singles ===
- (Spain) Pablo Carreño def. (Japan) Taro Daniel, 6–4, 6–1

=== Doubles ===
- (Netherlands) Antal van der Duim / (Netherlands) Boy Westerhof def. (Republic of Ireland) James Cluskey / (Netherlands) Jesse Huta Galung, 7–6^{(7–3)}, 6–4
