= 2017 Copa Sevilla – Doubles =

Doubles
- 2017 Copa Sevilla

Final
- Champions: (Argentina) Pedro Cachin (Spain) Íñigo Cervantes
- Runners-up: (Russia) Ivan Gakhov (Spain) David Vega Hernández
- Score: 7–6^{(7–5)}, 3–6, [10–5]

Events
| Singles | Doubles |
- Copa Sevilla

Íñigo Cervantes and Oriol Roca Batalla were the defending champions but only Cervantes chose to defend his title, partnering Pedro Cachin. Cervantes successfully defended his title.

Cachin and Cervantes won the title after defeating Ivan Gakhov and David Vega Hernández 7–6^{(7–5)}, 3–6, [10–5] in the final.

== Seeds ==
1. (Croatia) Dino Marcan / (Croatia) Antonio Šančić (first round)
2. (Belgium) Sander Gillé / (Switzerland) Luca Margaroli (first round)
3. (Portugal) Gonçalo Oliveira / (Poland) Grzegorz Panfil (first round)
4. (Hungary) Gábor Borsos / (Lithuania) Laurynas Grigelis (first round)

== Draw ==
Key

- Q = Qualifier
- WC = Wild card
- LL = Lucky loser
- Alt = Alternate
- ITF = ITF entry
- PR = Protected ranking
- SR = Special ranking
- SE = Special exempt
- JE = Junior exempt
- JR = Junior Accelerator Programme entrant
- CO = College Accelerator Programme entrant
- NG = Next Gen Accelerator Program entrant
- w/o = Walkover
- r = Retired
- d = Defaulted

First round
1 | (Croatia) D Marcan (Croatia) A Šančić | 6^{8} | 6 | [8]
WC | (Argentina) P Cachin (Spain) Í Cervantes | 7^{10} | 4 | [10]
(Portugal) G Elias (Portugal) F Gil | 2 | 6 | [7]
(Croatia) V Galović (Slovenia) B Rola | 6 | 4 | [10]
3 | (Portugal) G Oliveira (Poland) G Panfil | 4 | 4
(Spain) P Martínez (Spain) C Taberner | 6 | 6
(Russia) T Gabashvili (Italy) A Motti | 6 | 6^{7} | [10]
(Portugal) J Domingues (Venezuela) J Muñoz Abreu | 3 | 7^{9} | [8]
WC | (Spain) C Gómez-Herrera (Spain) B Zapata Miralles | 6 | 6
(Canada) F Auger-Aliassime (Norway) C Ruud | 4 | 4
(Spain) S Martos Gornés (Spain) P Toledo Bagué | 6 | 5 | [10]
4 | (Hungary) G Borsos (Lithuania) L Grigelis | 4 | 7 | [4]
(Spain) N Almagro (Brazil) E Russi Assumpção | 4 | 7 | [6]
WC | (Spain) Juan Pablo Cañas García (Spain) José Antonio Dugo Reyes | 6 | 5 | [10]
(Russia) I Gakhov (Spain) D Vega Hernández | 6 | 5 | [10]
2 | (Belgium) S Gillé (Switzerland) L Margaroli | 3 | 7 | [3]

Quarterfinals
WC | (Argentina) P Cachin (Spain) Í Cervantes | 6 | 6
(Croatia) V Galović (Slovenia) B Rola | 3 | 1
(Spain) P Martínez (Spain) C Taberner | 6 | 3 | [10]
(Russia) T Gabashvili (Italy) A Motti | 2 | 6 | [5]
WC | (Spain) C Gómez-Herrera (Spain) B Zapata Miralles | 4 | 2
(Spain) S Martos Gornés (Spain) P Toledo Bagué | 6 | 6
WC | (Spain) JP Cañas García (Spain) JA Dugo Reyes | 0 | 1
(Russia) I Gakhov (Spain) D Vega Hernández | 6 | 6

Semifinals
WC | (Argentina) P Cachin (Spain) Í Cervantes | 6 | 3 | [10]
(Spain) P Martínez (Spain) C Taberner | 4 | 6 | [6]
(Spain) S Martos Gornés (Spain) P Toledo Bagué | 4 | 6 | [7]
(Russia) I Gakhov (Spain) D Vega Hernández | 6 | 3 | [10]

Final
WC | (Argentina) P Cachin (Spain) Í Cervantes | 7^{7} | 3 | [10]
(Russia) I Gakhov (Spain) D Vega Hernández | 6^{5} | 6 | [5]
