= 2009 Copa Sevilla =

- Date: 7–13 September
- Edition: 12th
- Location: Seville, Spain

Champions

Singles
- (Spain) Pere Riba

Doubles
- (Philippines) Treat Conrad Huey / (India) Harsh Mankad
← 2008 ·	Copa Sevilla	· 2010 →

The 2009 Copa Sevilla was a professional tennis tournament played on outdoor yellow clay courts. It was the seventh edition of the tournament which was part of the 2009 ATP Challenger Tour. It took place in Seville, Spain between 7 and 13 September 2009.

== Singles main-draw entrants ==
=== Seeds ===
Nationality	Player	Ranking*	Seeding
ESP	Daniel Gimeno Traver	101	1
ESP	Rubén Ramírez Hidalgo	115	2
ESP	Santiago Ventura	118	3
ESP	Iván Navarro	119	4
ESP	Pere Riba	157	5
ESP	Pablo Andújar	172	6
BRA	Júlio Silva	197	7
GBR	James Ward	203	8

- Rankings are as of August 31, 2009.

=== Other entrants ===
The following players received wildcards into the singles main draw:

- (Spain) Agustín Boje-Ordóñez
- (Spain) Carlos Boluda-Purkiss
- (Spain) Steven Diez
- (Spain) Alberto Rodríguez-Cervantes

The following players received entry from the qualifying draw:

- (Italy) Enrico Burzi
- (Spain) Guillermo Olaso
- (Spain) Albert Ramos Viñolas
- (Spain) Gabriel Trujillo Soler

== Champions ==
=== Singles ===
(Spain) Pere Riba def. (Spain) Albert Ramos Viñolas, 7–6(2), 6–2

=== Doubles ===
(Philippines) Treat Conrad Huey / (India) Harsh Mankad def. (Italy) Alberto Brizzi / (Italy) Simone Vagnozzi, 6–1, 7–5
