= 2022 Copa Sevilla =

- Date: 5–10 September
- Edition: 24th
- Surface: Clay
- Location: Seville, Spain

Champions

Singles
- (Spain) Roberto Carballés Baena

Doubles
- (Argentina) Román Andrés Burruchaga / (Argentina) Facundo Díaz Acosta
← 2021 ·	Copa Sevilla	· 2023 →

The 2022 Copa Sevilla was a professional tennis tournament played on clay courts. It was the 24th edition of the tournament which was part of the 2022 ATP Challenger Tour. It took place in Seville, Spain between 5 and 10 September 2022.

== Singles main-draw entrants ==
=== Seeds ===
Country	Player	Rank^{1}	Seed
ESP	Pedro Martínez	54	1
ESP	Bernabé Zapata Miralles	79	2
ESP	Roberto Carballés Baena	80	3
ESP	Carlos Taberner	116	4
ITA	Franco Agamenone	125	5
ARG	Federico Delbonis	134	6
FRA	Alexandre Müller	143	7
ARG	Marco Trungelliti	179	8

- ^{1} Rankings are as of 29 August 2022.

=== Other entrants ===
The following players received wildcards into the singles main draw:

- (Spain) Javier Barranco Cosano
- (Poland) Jerzy Janowicz
- (Spain) Carlos López Montagud

The following player received entry into the singles main draw as a special exempt:

- (Belgium) Kimmer Coppejans

The following players received entry into the singles main draw as alternates:

- (Portugal) Frederico Ferreira Silva
- (Italy) Lorenzo Giustino
- (Kazakhstan) Timofey Skatov

The following players received entry from the qualifying draw:

- Bogdan Bobrov
- (Norway) Viktor Durasovic
- (Italy) Giovanni Fonio
- (Romania) Filip Cristian Jianu
- (Spain) Daniel Mérida
- (United States) Nicolas Moreno de Alboran

== Champions ==
=== Singles ===
- (Spain) Roberto Carballés Baena def. (Spain) Bernabé Zapata Miralles 6–3, 7–6^{(8–6)}.

=== Doubles ===
- (Argentina) Román Andrés Burruchaga / (Argentina) Facundo Díaz Acosta def. (Spain) Nicolás Álvarez Varona / (Spain) Alberto Barroso Campos 7–5, 6–7^{(8–10)}, [10–7].
