= 2013 Copa Sevilla – Doubles =

Doubles
- 2013 Copa Sevilla

Final
- Champions: (Italy) Alessandro Motti (France) Stéphane Robert
- Runners-up: (Netherlands) Stephan Fransen (Netherlands) Wesley Koolhof
- Score: 7–5, 7–5

Events
Singles	Doubles
← 2012 ·	Copa Sevilla	· 2014 →

Alessandro Motti and Stéphane Robert won the title, defeating Stephan Fransen and Wesley Koolhof 7–5, 7–5

== Seeds ==
1. (Germany) Gero Kretschmer / (Germany) Alexander Satschko (first round)
2. (United States) Vahid Mirzadeh / (United States) Denis Zivkovic (first round)
3. (Russia) Victor Baluda / (Russia) Andrey Kuznetsov (quarterfinals, retired)
4. (Netherlands) Stephan Fransen / (Netherlands) Wesley Koolhof (final)

== Draw ==
=== Key ===
- Q = Qualifier
- WC = Wild card
- LL = Lucky loser
- Alt = Alternate
- SE = Special exempt
- PR = Protected ranking
- ITF = ITF entry
- JE = Junior exempt
- w/o = Walkover
- r = Retired
- d = Defaulted
- SR = Special ranking

=== Draw ===
First round
1	(Germany) G Kretschmer (Germany) A Satschko	1	6	[5]
(Czech Republic) R Jebavý (Slovakia) Michal Schmid	6	4	[10]
(Uruguay) A Behar (Spain) C Poch-Gradin	7^{7}	3	[8]
(Italy) A Motti (France) S Robert	6^{3}	6	[10]
3	(Russia) V Baluda (Russia) A Kuznetsov	6	6
(Spain) R Carballés Baena (Spain) R Ortega-Olmedo	3	1
WC	(Spain) Ó Hernández (Spain) Adria Mas Mascolo	7	6
(Argentina) R Olivo (Argentina) M Trungelliti	5	2
WC	(Spain) Pedro Dominguez Alonso (Spain) Alberto Rodriguez-Cervantes	3	4
WC	(Spain) Agustin Boje-Ordonez (Spain) Juan José Leal-Gómez	6	6
(Spain) S Gutiérrez Ferrol (Spain) A Ramos	4	5
4	(Netherlands) S Fransen (Netherlands) W Koolhof	6	7
(Spain) J Checa-Calvo (Russia) A Lobkov	2	6^{4}
(Germany) A Beck (Spain) E López-Pérez	6	7^{7}
(France) A Michon (France) M Teixeira	6	6
2	(United States) V Mirzadeh (United States) D Zivkovic	3	2

Quarterfinals
(Czech Republic) R Jebavý (Slovakia) M Schmid	4	4
(Italy) A Motti (France) S Robert	6	6
3	(Russia) V Baluda (Russia) A Kuznetsov
WC	(Spain) Ó Hernández (Spain) A Mas Mascolo	w/o
WC	(Spain) A Boje-Ordonez (Spain) JJ Leal-Gómez	0	4
4	(Netherlands) S Fransen (Netherlands) W Koolhof	6	6
(Germany) A Beck (Spain) E López-Pérez	w/o
(France) A Michon (France) M Teixeira

Semifinals
(Italy) A Motti (France) S Robert	6	6
WC	(Spain) Ó Hernández (Spain) A Mas Mascolo	3	2
4	(Netherlands) S Fransen (Netherlands) W Koolhof	6	3	[10]
(Germany) A Beck (Spain) E López-Pérez	3	6	[7]

Final
(Italy) A Motti (France) S Robert	7	7
4	(Netherlands) S Fransen (Netherlands) W Koolhof	5	5
