= 2015 Copa Sevilla =

- Date: 7–13 September
- Edition: 18th
- Surface: Clay
- Location: Seville, Spain

Champions

Singles
- (Argentina) Pedro Cachin

Doubles
- (Netherlands) Wesley Koolhof / (Netherlands) Matwé Middelkoop
← 2014 ·	Copa Sevilla	· 2016 →

The 2015 Copa Sevilla was a professional tennis tournament played on clay courts. It was the 18th edition of the tournament which was part of the 2015 ATP Challenger Tour. It took place in Seville, Spain between 7 and 13 September 2015.

== Singles main-draw entrants ==
=== Seeds ===
Country	Player	Rank^{1}	Seed
ESP	Pablo Carreño Busta	54	1
ESP	Daniel Gimeno Traver	76	2
ESP	Íñigo Cervantes	112	3
ESP	Albert Montañés	126	4
ESP	Adrián Menéndez Maceiras	134	5
ARG	Renzo Olivo	176	6
CZE	Jan Mertl	205	7
ESP	Jordi Samper Montaña	208	8

- ^{1} Rankings are as of August 31, 2015.

=== Other entrants ===
The following players received wildcards into the singles main draw:

- (Spain) Agustín Boje Ordóñez
- (Spain) Jaume Munar
- (Spain) Ricardo Ojeda Lara
- (Spain) Mario Vilella Martínez

The following players received entry from the qualifying draw:

- (Russia) Ivan Gakhov
- (Spain) Juan Lizariturry
- (Netherlands) Matwé Middelkoop
- (Spain) David Vega Hernández

== Champions ==
=== Singles ===
- (Argentina) Pedro Cachin def. (Spain) Pablo Carreño, 7–5, 6–3

=== Doubles ===
- (Netherlands) Wesley Koolhof / (Netherlands) Matwé Middelkoop def. (Italy) Marco Bortolotti / (Poland) Kamil Majchrzak, 7–6^{(7–5)}, 6–4
