= 2012 Copa Sevilla =

- Date: 10–16 September
- Edition: 15th
- Surface: Clay
- Location: Seville, Spain

Champions

Singles
- (Spain) Daniel Gimeno Traver

Doubles
- (Serbia) Nikola Ćirić / (Serbia) Boris Pašanski
← 2011 ·	Copa Sevilla	· 2013 →

The 2012 Copa Sevilla was a professional tennis tournament played on clay courts. It was the 15th edition of the tournament which was part of the 2012 ATP Challenger Tour. It took place in Seville, Spain, between 10 and 16 September 2012.

== Singles main-draw entrants ==
=== Seeds ===
Country	Player	Rank^{1}	Seed
ESP	Roberto Bautista Agut	93	1
ESP	Daniel Gimeno Traver	96	2
ARG	Federico Delbonis	130	3
POR	Rui Machado	131	4
ESP	Íñigo Cervantes Huegun	146	5
ESP	Tommy Robredo	178	6
ESP	Javier Martí	180	7
FRA	Nicolas Devilder	196	8

- ^{1} Rankings are as of August 27, 2012.

=== Other entrants ===
The following players received wildcards into the singles main draw:

- (Spain) David Vega Hernández
- (Spain) Mario Vilella Martínez
- (Spain) Agustín Boje-Ordóñez
- (Spain) Tommy Robredo

The following players received entry as an alternate into the singles main draw:

- (Japan) Taro Daniel

The following players received entry from the qualifying draw:

- (Spain) David Estruch
- (Spain) David Pérez Sanz
- (Venezuela) Ricardo Rodríguez
- (Netherlands) Nick van der Meer

== Champions ==
=== Singles ===
- (Spain) Daniel Gimeno Traver def. (Spain) Tommy Robredo, 6–3, 6–2

=== Doubles ===
- (Serbia) Nikola Ćirić / (Serbia) Boris Pašanski def. (Netherlands) Stephan Fransen / (Netherlands) Jesse Huta Galung, 5–7, 6–4, [10–6]
