= 2021 Copa Sevilla – Singles =

Singles
- 2021 Copa Sevilla

Final
- Champion: (Spain) Pedro Martínez
- Runner-up: (Spain) Roberto Carballés Baena
- Score: 6–4, 6–1

Events
Singles	Doubles
- Copa Sevilla

Alejandro Davidovich Fokina was the defending champion but chose not to defend his title.

Pedro Martínez won the title after defeating Roberto Carballés Baena 6–4, 6–1 in the final.

== Seeds ==
1. (Spain) Pablo Andújar (quarterfinals)
2. (Spain) Pedro Martínez (champion)
3. (Spain) Roberto Carballés Baena (final)
4. (Spain) Carlos Taberner (semifinals)
5. (Spain) Bernabé Zapata Miralles (second round)
6. (Italy) Federico Gaio (second round)
7. (Chile) Marcelo Tomás Barrios Vera (semifinals)
8. (Italy) Lorenzo Giustino (first round)

== Draw ==
Key

- Q = Qualifier
- WC = Wild card
- LL = Lucky loser
- Alt = Alternate
- ITF = ITF entry
- PR = Protected ranking
- SR = Special ranking
- SE = Special exempt
- JE = Junior exempt
- JR = Junior Accelerator Programme entrant
- CO = College Accelerator Programme entrant
- NG = Next Gen Accelerator Program entrant
- w/o = Walkover
- r = Retired
- d = Defaulted

=== Finals ===
Semifinals
7	(Chile) Marcelo Tomás Barrios Vera	1	3
3	(Spain) Roberto Carballés Baena	6	6
4	(Spain) Carlos Taberner	4	3
2	(Spain) Pedro Martínez	6	6

Final
3	(Spain) Roberto Carballés Baena	4	1
2	(Spain) Pedro Martínez	6	6

=== Top half ===
First round
1	(Spain) P Andújar	6	7
(Spain) J Barranco Cosano	2	5
WC	(Spain) A López San Martín	6	4	6
Q	(Spain) B Winter López	4	6	1
(Belgium) M Geerts	3	2
(United Kingdom) J Draper	6	6
WC	(Spain) N Sánchez Izquierdo	6	2	5
7	(Chile) MT Barrios Vera	4	6	7
3	(Spain) R Carballés Baena	6	3	6
Alt	(Italy) J Ocleppo	2	6	3
(Spain) R Ortega Olmedo	6^{2}	0
(Bulgaria) A Andreev	7^{7}	6
(Spain) C Gimeno Valero	0^{r}
Q	(Italy) L Darderi	3
(Russia) T Gabashvili	2	1
6	(Italy) F Gaio	6	6

Second round
1	(Spain) P Andújar	3	6	6
WC	(Spain) A López San Martín	6	1	4
(United Kingdom) J Draper	5^{r}
7	(Chile) MT Barrios Vera	6
3	(Spain) R Carballés Baena	6	6
(Bulgaria) A Andreev	4	1
Q	(Italy) L Darderi	6	7^{7}
6	(Italy) F Gaio	0	6^{1}

Quarterfinals
1	(Spain) P Andújar	6^{1}	6	4
7	(Chile) MT Barrios Vera	7^{7}	2	6
3	(Spain) R Carballés Baena	7	7^{7}
Q	(Italy) L Darderi	5	6^{5}

Semifinals
7	(Chile) MT Barrios Vera	1	3
3	(Spain) R Carballés Baena	6	6

=== Bottom half ===
First round
5	(Spain) B Zapata Miralles	6	6
PR	(Italy) F Baldi	3	2
(Italy) GM Moroni	7^{7}	6
(Spain) N Kuhn	6^{5}	1
(Portugal) G Oliveira	2	6	2
PR	(Germany) J Lenz	6	4	6
Q	(Germany) Lucas Gerch	1	4
4	(Spain) C Taberner	6	6
8	(Italy) L Giustino	0	2
(Italy) F Cobolli	6	6
WC	(Spain) P Llamas Ruiz	7	4
(Argentina) C Ugo Carabelli	5	1^{r}
(Italy) R Brancaccio	6	2	7^{7}
Alt	(Argentina) GA Olivieri	2	6	6^{4}
Q	(United States) Em Nava	5	4
2	(Spain) P Martínez	7	6

Second round
5	(Spain) B Zapata Miralles	6	1	4
(Italy) GM Moroni	3	6	6
PR	(Germany) J Lenz	3	3
4	(Spain) C Taberner	6	6
(Italy) F Cobolli	6	7
WC	(Spain) P Llamas Ruiz	3	5
(Italy) R Brancaccio	4	6	4
2	(Spain) P Martínez	6	4	6

Quarterfinals
(Italy) GM Moroni	4	6	5
4	(Spain) C Taberner	6	0	7
(Italy) F Cobolli	4	2
2	(Spain) P Martínez	6	6

Semifinals
4	(Spain) C Taberner	4	3
2	(Spain) P Martínez	6	6
