= 2021 Copa Sevilla =

- Date: 6–12 September
- Edition: 23rd
- Surface: Clay
- Location: Seville, Spain

Champions

Singles
- (Spain) Pedro Martínez

Doubles
- (Spain) David Vega Hernández / (Netherlands) Mark Vervoort
- Copa Sevilla

The 2021 Copa Sevilla was a professional tennis tournament played on clay courts. It was the 23rd edition of the tournament which was part of the 2021 ATP Challenger Tour. It took place in Seville, Spain between 6 and 12 September 2021.

== Singles main-draw entrants ==
=== Seeds ===
Country	Player	Rank^{1}	Seed
ESP	Pablo Andújar	74	1
ESP	Pedro Martínez	75	2
ESP	Roberto Carballés Baena	95	3
ESP	Carlos Taberner	105	4
ESP	Bernabé Zapata Miralles	116	5
ITA	Federico Gaio	159	6
CHI	Marcelo Tomás Barrios Vera	172	7
ITA	Lorenzo Giustino	238	8

- ^{1} Rankings are as of 30 August 2021.

=== Other entrants ===
The following players received wildcards into the singles main draw:

- (Spain) Pablo Llamas Ruiz
- (Spain) Álvaro López San Martín
- (Spain) Nikolás Sánchez Izquierdo

The following players received entry into the singles main draw using protected rankings:

- (Italy) Filippo Baldi
- (Germany) Julian Lenz

The following players received entry into the singles main draw as alternates:

- (Italy) Julian Ocleppo
- (Argentina) Genaro Alberto Olivieri

The following players received entry from the qualifying draw:

- (Italy) Luciano Darderi
- (Germany) Lucas Gerch
- (United States) Emilio Nava
- (Spain) Benjamín Winter López

== Champions ==
=== Singles ===
- (Spain) Pedro Martínez def. (Spain) Roberto Carballés Baena 6–4, 6–1.

=== Doubles ===
- (Spain) David Vega Hernández / (Netherlands) Mark Vervoort def. (Spain) Javier Barranco Cosano / (Spain) Sergio Martos Gornés 6–3, 6–7^{(7–9)}, [10–7].
