= Guillermo Olaso =

Spanish tennis player (born 1988)

Guillermo Olaso de la Rica
- Country (sports): Spain
- Residence: Singapore
- Born: 25 March 1988 (age 38) Bilbao, Spain
- Height: 1.75 m (5 ft 9 in)
- Turned pro: 2006
- Plays: Right-handed (two-handed backhand)
- Coach: Ronald Martin
- Prize money: $273,913

Singles
- Career record: 2–4
- Career titles: 0
- Highest ranking: No. 167 (18 July 2011)

Grand Slam singles results
- Australian Open: Q2 (2011)
- French Open: Q2 (2012)
- Wimbledon: Q3 (2011)
- US Open: Q2 (2009)

Doubles
- Career record: 0–0
- Career titles: 0
- Highest ranking: No. 160 (11 October 2010)

Guillermo Olaso de la Rica (Spanish pronunciation: [ɡiˈʎeɾmo oˈlaso ðe la ˈrika]; (Note: In isolation, De la Rica is pronounced [de la ˈrika].) born 25 March 1988) is a Spanish professional tennis player.

Olaso reached career-high rankings of world No. 167 in singles and No. 160 in doubles, primarily competing on the ATP Challenger and ITF circuits.

== Match-fixing investigation and suspension ==
In December 2013, the Tennis Integrity Unit (TIU) found Olaso guilty of 3 charges under the Uniform Tennis Anti-Corruption Program (UTACP). The investigation determined that in 2010, Olaso failed to report corrupt approaches and engaged in professional misconduct related to match-fixing, including directly or indirectly seeking to "contrive the outcome and any other aspect of any event".

The TIU issued a 5-year ban and a $25,000 fine. While the final 18 months of the suspension were conditional upon Olaso participating in anti-corruption education, the initial sanction barred him from all professional competition. Olaso appealed the ruling to the Court of Arbitration for Sport (CAS), but the court upheld his suspension in 2014, citing sufficient evidence for the original findings and noting that "the sanction was proportionate and appropriate in the circumstances".

== Challenger finals ==
=== Singles: 1 (0-1) ===
Legend
ATP Challenger Tour (0-1)

Result	No.	Date	Tournament	Surface	Opponent	Score
Loss	1.	14 February 2011	Meknes, Morocco	Clay	(Czech Republic) Jaroslav Pospíšil	1–6, 6–3, 3–6

=== Doubles: 5 (2-3) ===
Legend
ATP Challenger Tour (2-3)

Result	No.	Date	Tournament	Surface	Partner	Opponent	Score
Loss	1.	23 November 2009	Puebla, Mexico	Hard	(Spain) Pere Riba	(Canada) Vasek Pospisil (Canada) Adil Shamasdin	6–7^{(7–9)}, 0–6
Loss	2.	21 June 2010	Marburg, Germany	Clay	(Slovenia) Grega Žemlja	(Germany) Matthias Bachinger (Germany) Denis Gremelmayr	4–6, 4–6
Loss	3.	10 September 2010	Seville, Spain	Clay	(Serbia) Nikola Ćirić	(Spain) Daniel Muñoz-de la Nava (Spain) Santiago Ventura	2–6, 5–7
Win	1.	4 October 2010	Tarragona, Spain	Clay	(Spain) Pere Riba	(Spain) Pablo Andújar (Spain) Gerard Granollers-Pujol	7–6^{(7–1)}, 4–6, [10–5]
Win	2.	12 May 2013	Karshi, Uzbekistan	Hard	(Chinese Taipei) Chen Ti	(Australia) Jordan Kerr (Russia) Konstantin Kravchuk	7–6^{(7–5)}, 7–5

== Futures ==
No.	Date	Tournament	Surface	Opponent	Score
1.	16 July 2007	Spain F27, Spain	Hard	(Spain) Pablo Santos	6–4, 6–4
2.	12 May 2008	Poland F1, Poland	Clay	(Slovakia) Pavol Červenák	7–6^{(12–10)}, 6–3
3.	30 March 2009	Italy F5, Italy	Clay	(Italy) Daniele Bracciali	6–1, 6–3
