= Carlos Gómez-Herrera =

Spanish tennis player (born 1990)

- Country (sports): Spain
- Residence: Marbella, Spain
- Born: 30 April 1990 (age 36) Marbella, Spain
- Height: 1.90 m (6 ft 3 in)
- Turned pro: 2007
- Plays: Right-handed (two-handed backhand)
- Coach: Pepe Imaz
- Prize money: $197,028

Singles
- Career record: 0–1 (at ATP Tour level, Grand Slam level, and in Davis Cup)
- Career titles: 0
- Highest ranking: No. 268 (7 May 2018)

Doubles
- Career record: 3–1 (at ATP Tour level, Grand Slam level, and in Davis Cup)
- Career titles: 0
- Highest ranking: No. 195 (26 July 2021)
- Last updated on: 8 November 2021.

Carlos Gómez-Herrera (Spanish pronunciation: [ˈkaɾlos ˈɣomeθ eˈreɾa]; (Note: In isolation, Gómez is pronounced [ˈɡomeθ].) born 30 April 1990) is a Spanish tennis player.

== Career ==
Gómez-Herrera has a career high ATP singles ranking of World No. 268 achieved on 7 May 2018. He has a career high ATP doubles ranking of World No. 195 achieved on 26 July 2021.

Gómez-Herrera made his ATP main draw debut at the 2012 Serbia Open in the singles draw after he qualified for the tournament. He lost in the first round to Victor Hănescu.

In 2021 he played doubles at the ATP 250 Mallorca tournament on grass alongside world No. 1 in singles Novak Djokovic. They defeated Tomislav Brkić and Nikola Ćaćić in the first round after saving two match points in the third-set match tiebreak. They advanced to the semifinals by beating top seeded Marcel Granollers and Horacio Zeballos, again in the third-set match tiebreak. They subsequently defeated third seeded Oliver Marach and Aisam-ul-Haq Qureshi to reach the final but they withdrew before the championship match with Gómez-Herrera citing an ankle injury. As a result, he made his debut in the top 200 in doubles at World No. 197 on 28 June 2021.

== ATP career finals ==
=== Doubles: 1 (1 runner-up) ===
Legend Grand Slam tournaments (0–0) ATP Finals (0–0) ATP Tour Masters 1000 (0–0) Summer Olympics (0–0) ATP Tour 500 Series (0–0) ATP Tour 250 Series (0–1)	Titles by surface Hard (0–0) Clay (0–0) Grass (0–1)	Titles by location Outdoors (0–1) Indoors (0–0)

Result	W–L	Date	Tournament	Tier	Surface	Partner	Opponents	Score
Loss	0–1	Jun 2021	Mallorca Open, Spain	250 Series	Grass	(Serbia) Novak Djokovic	(Italy) Simone Bolelli (Argentina) Máximo González	Walkover

== ATP Challenger and ITF Futures finals ==
=== Singles: 16 (10–6) ===
Legend ATP Challenger (0–1) ITF Futures (10–5)	Finals by surface Hard (6–3) Clay (4–3) Grass (0–0) Carpet (0–0)

Result	W–L	Date	Tournament	Tier	Surface	Opponent	Score
Loss	0–1	Jul 2012	Serbia F5, Belgrade	Futures	Clay	(Serbia) Marko Djokovic	1–4 ret.
Win	1–1	Aug 2012	Serbia F9, Novi Sad	Futures	Clay	(Serbia) Miljan Zekić	6–2, 6–2
Loss	1–2	Apr 2013	Greece F2, Heraklion	Futures	Hard	(Spain) Andrés Artuñedo	3–6, 6–7^{(2–7)}
Win	2–2	Jun 2013	Greece F9, Thessaloniki	Futures	Clay	(Greece) Theodoros Angelinos	4–6, 6–2, 6–2
Win	3–2	Aug 2013	Serbia F8, Novi Sad	Futures	Clay	(France) Cedrick Commin	6–0, 6–1
Win	4–2	Aug 2013	Serbia F9, Novi Sad	Futures	Clay	(Bulgaria) Dimitar Kuzmanov	3–6, 6–1, 6–2
Win	5–2	Jun 2015	Spain F17, Martos	Futures	Hard	(Spain) Ricardo Ojeda Lara	6–4, 6–2
Loss	5–3	Oct 2015	Spain F33, Madrid	Futures	Hard	(Spain) Roberto Ortega Olmedo	7–5, 5–7, 2–6
Win	6–3	Oct 2016	Spain F33, Madrid	Futures	Hard	(Spain) Andrés Artuñedo	6–4, 6–3
Win	7–3	Nov 2016	Greece F9, Heraklion	Futures	Hard	(Israel) Daniel Cukierman	6–2, 6–2
Win	8–3	Jun 2017	Spain F17, Martos	Futures	Hard	(United States) JC Aragone	7–5, 4–6, 7–5
Win	9–3	Sep 2017	Spain F19, Castelo Branco	Futures	Hard	(Portugal) Fred Gil	7–5, 6–1
Loss	9–4	Nov 2017	Greece F8, Heraklion	Futures	Hard	(Netherlands) Tallon Griekspoor	4–6, 2–6
Win	10–4	Nov 2017	Greece F9, Heraklion	Futures	Hard	(Germany) Jakob Sude	7–6^{(7–3)}, 6–2
Loss	10–5	Mar 2018	Santiago, Chile	Challenger	Clay	(Italy) Marco Cecchinato	6–1, 1–6, 1–6
Loss	10–6	Feb 2020	M25 Lima, Peru	World Tennis Tour	Clay	(Chile) Marcelo Tomás Barrios Vera	2–6, 2–6

=== Doubles: 16 (8–8) ===
Legend ATP Challenger (1–1) ITF Futures (7–7)	Finals by surface Hard (6–5) Clay (2–2) Grass (0–0) Carpet (0–1)

Result	W–L	Date	Tournament	Tier	Surface	Partner	Opponents	Score
Loss	0–1	Jun 2010	Spain F20, Tenerefe	Futures	Carpet	(Spain) Roberto Ortega Olmedo	(Spain) Georgi Rumenov Payakov (Portugal) João Sousa	6–7^{(2–7)}, 2–6
Win	1–1	Jun 2010	Spain F22, Melilla	Futures	Hard	(Spain) Abraham Gonzalez-Jimenez	(Italy) Erik Crepaldi (Italy) Claudio Grassi	6–2, 6–2
Win	2–1	Aug 2012	Serbia F9, Novi Sad	Futures	Clay	(Serbia) Marko Djokovic	(Croatia) Mate Cutura (Bosnia and Herzegovina) Franjo Raspudic	6–4, 6–3
Win	3–1	Nov 2013	Greece F18, Heraklion	Futures	Hard	(Serbia) Marko Djokovic	(United Kingdom) Luke Bambridge (United Kingdom) Oliver Golding	6–1, 6–7^{(3–7)}, [13–11]
Loss	3–2	Oct 2015	Portugal F12, Oliveira De Azemeis	Futures	Hard	(United Kingdom) Matthew Short	(Portugal) Nuno Deus (Portugal) João Domingues	3–6, 4–6
Loss	3–3	Oct 2015	Spain F33, Madrid	Futures	Hard	(Spain) Ivan Arenas-Gualda	(Spain) Juan Lizariturry (United Kingdom) Matthew Short	4–6, 6–3, [3–10]
Loss	3–4	Apr 2016	Spain F8, Madrid	Futures	Hard	(Japan) Akira Santillan	(Australia) Alex de Minaur (Spain) Carlos Boluda Purkiss	4–6, 4–6
Win	4–4	Oct 2016	Spain F33, Madrid	Futures	Hard	(Spain) Gerard Granollers Pujol	(Spain) Miguel Semmier (Spain) Carlos Boluda Purkiss	6–1, 5–3 ret.
Loss	4–5	Mar 2017	Portugal F3, Loulé	Futures	Hard	(United Kingdom) Nikki Roenn	(Spain) David Vega Hernández (Spain) Roberto Ortega Olmedo	4–6, 5–7
Loss	4–6	Apr 2017	Spain F10, Madrid	Futures	Clay	(Spain) Juan Lizariturry	(Spain) Carlos Boluda Purkiss (Spain) Roberto Ortega Olmedo	6–7^{(6–8)}, 3–6
Loss	4–7	Jul 2017	Spain F20, Getzo	Futures	Clay	(Spain) Juan Lizariturry	(Spain) David Vega Hernández (Russia) Ivan Gakhov	6–3, 3–6, [6–10]
Win	5–7	Sep 2017	Portugal F19, Castelo Branco	Futures	Hard	(Portugal) Fred Gil	(Portugal) Nuno Deus (Spain) Luis Faria	6–2, 6–4
Win	6–7	Nov 2017	Greece F8, Heraklion	Futures	Hard	(Serbia) Marko Djokovic	(United States) Conor Berg (United States) Mousheg Hovhannisyan	6–1, 6–2
Win	7–7	Aug 2019	Portorož, Slovenia	Challenger	Hard	(Russia) Teymuraz Gabashvili	(Austria) Lucas Miedler (Austria) Tristan-Samuel Weissborn	6–3, 6–2
Win	8–7	Feb 2020	M25 Lima, Peru	World Tennis Tour	Clay	(Chile) Marcelo Tomas Barrios Vera	(Argentina) Nicolas Alberto Arreche (Peru) Jorge Brian Panta	7–5, 6–2
Loss	8–8	Feb 2020	Cuernavaca, Mexico	Challenger	Hard	(Japan) Shintaro Mochizuki	(Australia) Luke Saville (Australia) John-Patrick Smith	3–6, 7–6^{(7–4)}, [5–10]
