= Nikola Ćirić =

Serbian tennis player and coach (born 1983)

- Country (sports): Yugoslavia (2000–2003) / Serbia and Montenegro (2003–2006) / Serbia (2006–2018)
- Residence: Belgrade, Serbia
- Born: August 2, 1983 (age 42) Belgrade, SR Serbia, SFR Yugoslavia
- Height: 2.01 m (6 ft 7 in)
- Turned pro: 2000
- Retired: 2014
- Plays: Left-handed (one handed-backhand)
- Coach: Damir Dimitrijević
- Prize money: $197,573

Singles
- Career record: 0–0
- Career titles: 0
- Highest ranking: No. 151 (1 August 2011)

Grand Slam singles results
- Australian Open: Q1 (2011, 2012)
- French Open: Q3 (2011), Q1 (2012)
- Wimbledon: Q1 (2011, 2012)
- US Open: Q1 (2011)

Doubles
- Career record: 1–2
- Career titles: 0
- Highest ranking: No. 168 (5 November 2012)

Team competitions
- Davis Cup: 1–0 (Sin. 0–0, Dbs. 1–0)
Medal record
Representing Serbia and Montenegro
Universiade
Silver medal – second place	2005 İzmir	Men's Doubles
- Last updated on: 3 December 2024.

Nikola Ćirić (Serbian Cyrillic: Никола Ћирић, pronounced [nǐkola tɕǐːritɕ]; born 2 August 1983) is a Serbian tennis coach and former professional tennis player, who played mainly on the ATP Challenger Tour. He turned pro in 2000 and reached his career-high ranking of 151 on 1 August 2011. He was coached by a former rugby professional Damir Dimitrijević.

He served as the coach for several Serbian tennis players, including Nikola Ćaćić (2014), Peđa Krstin (2015–2016), Marko Tepavac (2016), Nikola Milojević (2019–2021). Additionally, he was the head coach and assistant captain of the Serbia Billie Jean King Cup team from 2012 to 2013 and again from 2015 to 2020.
