= Ricardo Ojeda Lara =

Spanish tennis player (born 1993)

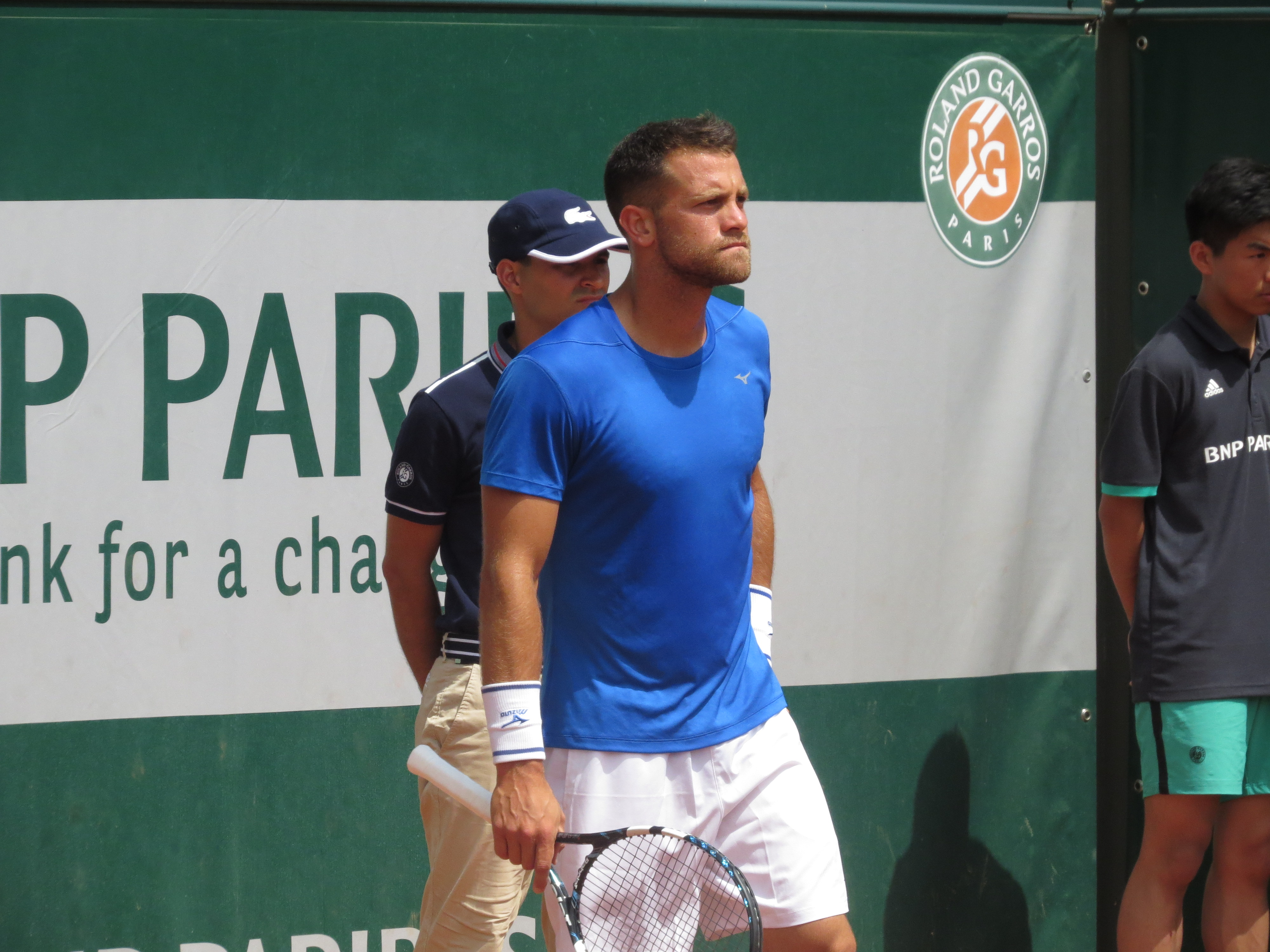
- Ojeda Lara at the 2017 French Open
- Country (sports): Spain
- Residence: Valencia, Spain
- Born: 26 January 1993 (age 32) El Puerto de Santa María, Spain
- Height: 1.80 m (5 ft 11 in)
- Plays: Right-handed (two-handed backhand)
- Prize money: $210,006

Singles
- Career record: 3–3
- Career titles: 0
- Highest ranking: No. 171 (9 October 2017)
- Current ranking: No. 297 (17 September 2018)

Grand Slam singles results
- French Open: Q2 (2017)
- Wimbledon: Q1 (2017, 2018)
- US Open: Q1 (2018)

Doubles
- Career record: 0–0
- Career titles: 0
- Highest ranking: No. 549 (10 September 2018)
- Current ranking: No. 629 (17 September 2018)
- Last updated on: 19 September 2018.

Ricardo Ojeda Lara (Spanish pronunciation: [riˈkaɾðo oˈxeða ˈlaɾa]; born 26 January 1993) is a Spanish tennis player.

Ojeda Lara has a career high ATP singles ranking of 171 achieved on 9 October 2017. He also has a career high doubles ranking of 549 achieved on 10 September 2018.

Ojeda Lara has won 1 ATP Challenger singles title at the 2017 Bucher Reisen Tennis Grand Prix.

== Tour titles ==
Legend
Grand Slam (0)
ATP Masters Series (0)
ATP Tour (0)
Challengers (1)

=== Singles ===
Result	Date	Category	Tournament	Surface	Opponent	Score
Winner	20 August 2017	Challenger	Meerbusch, Germany	Clay	(Austria) Andreas Haider-Maurer	6–4, 6–3
