= Copa Sevilla =

ATP Challenger Tour
- Event name: Copa Sevilla
- Founded: 1963; 63 years ago
- Location: Seville, Spain
- Venue: Real Club de Tenis Betis
- Category: ATP Challenger Tour 125
- Surface: Yellow Clay / Outdoors
- Draw: 32S/32Q/16D
- Prize money: €148,625+H
- Website: Website

The Copa Sevilla is a professional tennis tournament played on outdoor clay courts. It is part of the Association of Tennis Professionals (ATP) Challenger Tour since 1991. It is held annually at the Real Club de Tenis Betis in Seville, Spain since 1963. It became a Challenger 125 event in September 2023, on its 60th anniversary.

== Past finals ==
=== Key ===
Challenger
Non-Tour Event

=== Singles ===
Year	Champion	Runner-up	Score
2026	(Argentina) Facundo Díaz Acosta	(Serbia) Dušan Lajović	6–2, 6–1
2025	(Peru) Ignacio Buse	(Argentina) Genaro Alberto Olivieri	6–3, 3–6, 6–3
2024	(Spain) Roberto Carballés Baena	(Germany) Daniel Altmaier	6–3, 7–5
2023	(Spain) Roberto Carballés Baena	(France) Calvin Hemery	6–3, 6–1
2022	(Spain) Roberto Carballés Baena	(Spain) Bernabé Zapata Miralles	6–3, 7–6^{(8–6)}
2021	(Spain) Pedro Martínez	(Spain) Roberto Carballés Baena	6–4, 6–1
2020	Not held		
2019	(Spain) Alejandro Davidovich Fokina	(Spain) Jaume Munar	2–6, 6–2, 6–2
2018	(Belgium) Kimmer Coppejans	(Slovakia) Alex Molčan	7–6^{(7–2)}, 6–1
2017	(Canada) Félix Auger-Aliassime	(Spain) Íñigo Cervantes	6–7^{(4–7)}, 6–3, 6–3
2016	(Norway) Casper Ruud	(Japan) Taro Daniel	6–3, 6–4
2015	(Argentina) Pedro Cachin	(Spain) Pablo Carreño	7–5, 6–3
2014	(Spain) Pablo Carreño	(Japan) Taro Daniel	6–4, 6–1
2013	(Spain) Daniel Gimeno Traver	(France) Stéphane Robert	6–4, 7–6^{(7–2)}
2012	(Spain) Daniel Gimeno Traver	(Spain) Tommy Robredo	6–3, 6–2
2011	(Spain) Daniel Gimeno Traver	(Spain) Rubén Ramírez Hidalgo	6–3, 6–3
2010	(Spain) Albert Ramos-Viñolas	(Spain) Pere Riba	6–3, 3–6, 7–5
2009	(Spain) Pere Riba	(Spain) Albert Ramos-Viñolas	7–6^{(7–2)}, 6–2
2008	(Spain) Pere Riba	(Italy) Enrico Burzi	6–1, 6–3
2007	(Portugal) Frederico Gil	(Spain) Pablo Andújar	6–1, 6–3
2006	(Spain) Iván Navarro	(Spain) Héctor Ruiz-Cadenas	6–3, 6–4
2005	(Austria) Marco Mirnegg	(Brazil) Marcos Daniel	6–3, 3–0, ret.
2004	(Spain) Óscar Hernández	(Germany) Alexander Waske	7–5, 3–6, 6–4
2003	(Peru) Luis Horna	(Spain) Guillermo García López	6–0, 4–6, 6–3
2002	(France) Olivier Mutis	(Spain) Albert Portas	6–3, 7–5
2001	(Italy) Stefano Galvani	(Australia) Todd Larkham	6–2, 6–4
2000	(Spain) Tommy Robredo	(Spain) Óscar Serrano	6–7^{(7–2)}, 6–1, 6–4
1999	(Argentina) Sebastián Prieto	(Spain) Jacobo Díaz	4–6, 6–2, 6–1
1998	(Spain) Alberto Martín	(Italy) Davide Scala	6–1, 5–7, 6–2
1997	(Spain) Álex Calatrava	(Spain) Álex López Morón	6–2, 6–4
1996	(Spain) Francisco Roig	(Egypt) Tamer El-Sawy	6–3, 6–4
1995	(Germany) Dirk Dier	(Spain) Tati Rascón	7–5, 6–2
1994	(Spain) Gonzalo López-Fabero	(Italy) Paolo Canè	6–4, 7–6
1993	(Germany) Dirk Dier	(Mexico) Oliver Fernández	6–3, 6–3
1992	(Colombia) Mauricio Hadad	(Denmark) Kenneth Carlsen	6–7, 6–3, 6–3
1991	(Germany) Lars Koslowski	(Sweden) Tomas Nydahl	6–2, 3–6, 7–6
1990	(Argentina) Agustín Garizzio	(Spain) Javier Molina	6–4, 6–2
1989	(Colombia) Mauricio Hadad	(Argentina) Gustavo Carbonari	6–3, 6–7, 6–3
1988	(Spain) David de Miguel	(Spain) Jesús Colás	6–2, 6–2
1987	(Spain) Francisco Roig	(Sweden) Thomas Hardin	6–3, 6–4, 6–3
1986	(Australia) Carl Limberger	(Mexico) Agustín Moreno	3–6, 6–2, 8–6
1985	(Spain) David de Miguel	(Spain) Jorge Bardou	3–6, 6–2, 6–3
1984	(Chile) Alejandro Pierola	(Brazil) Fernando Roese	6–4, 6–2
1983	(Spain) David de Miguel	(Spain) Ernesto Vázquez	6–2, 6–3
1982	(Spain) Pedro Osete		
1981	(Spain) Teodoro Gurrea		
1980	(Spain) Pedro Osete		
1979	(Spain) Salvador Cabeza		
1978	(Spain) Salvador Cabeza		
1977	(Colombia) Jairo Velasco Sr.	(Spain) José Moreno	6–2, 6–1
1976	(Spain) Pedro Osete		
1975	(Spain) Antonio Pujalte		
1974	(Spain) José Moreno	(Brazil) José Edison Mandarino	6–4, 3–6, 7–6, 6–3
1973	No winner		
1972	(Denmark) Torben Ulrich	(United States) Steven Turner	5–7, 6–2, 6–4
1971	(Colombia) Iván Molina	(Australia) Bob Rheinberger	6–4, 6–4
1970	(Spain) José María Gisbert	(United States) Stephen Fiske	12–10, 6–3, 11–9
1969	(Australia) Geoff Masters	(Australia) John Bartlett	6–1, 6–1
1968	(Spain) Juan Manuel Couder		
1967	(Spain) Juan Manuel Couder	(Australia) Colin Stubs	5–7, 5–7, 7–5, 6–3, 6–4
1966	(Spain) Manuel Orantes	(Chile) Jaime Pinto Bravo	
1965	(Spain) Antonio Martínez	(Spain) José María Alfín	6–2, 6–2, 6–4
1964	(Spain) José María Alfín	(Spain) José Castañón	6–3, 6–3
1963	(Spain) José María Alfín	(Spain) Antonio Solana	4–6, 6–3, 5–7, 6–4, 8–6

=== Doubles ===
Year	Champions	Runners-up	Score
2026	(Colombia) Nicolás Barrientos (Argentina) Mariano Kestelboim	(Spain) Íñigo Cervantes (Ukraine) Denys Molchanov	7–6^{(7–3)}, 6–3
2025	(Czech Republic) Jonáš Forejtek (Czech Republic) Dominik Kellovský	(Spain) Mario Mansilla Díez (Spain) Bruno Pujol Navarro	2–6, 6–3, [10–5]
2024	(Czech Republic) Petr Nouza (Czech Republic) Patrik Rikl	(United States) George Goldhoff (Brazil) Fernando Romboli	6–3, 6–2
2023	(Spain) Alberto Barroso Campos (Spain) Pedro Martínez	(India) Sriram Balaji (Brazil) Fernando Romboli	3–6, 7–6^{(7–5)}, [11–9]
2022	(Argentina) Román Andrés Burruchaga (Argentina) Facundo Díaz Acosta	(Spain) Nicolás Álvarez Varona (Spain) Alberto Barroso Campos	7–5, 6–7^{(8–10)}, [10–7]
2021	(Spain) David Vega Hernández (Netherlands) Mark Vervoort	(Spain) Javier Barranco Cosano (Spain) Sergio Martos Gornés	6–3, 6–7^{(7–9)}, [10–7]
2020	Not held		
2019	(Spain) Gerard Granollers (Spain) Pedro Martínez	(Belgium) Kimmer Coppejans (Spain) Sergio Martos Gornés	7–5, 6–4
2018	(Spain) Gerard Granollers (Spain) Pedro Martínez	(Spain) Daniel Gimeno Traver (Spain) Ricardo Ojeda Lara	6–0, 6–2
2017	(Argentina) Pedro Cachin (Spain) Íñigo Cervantes	(Russia) Ivan Gakhov (Spain) David Vega Hernández	7–6^{(7–5)}, 3–6, [10–5]
2016	(Spain) Íñigo Cervantes (Spain) Oriol Roca Batalla	(Uruguay) Ariel Behar (Spain) Enrique López Pérez	6–2, 6–5 ret.
2015	(Netherlands) Wesley Koolhof (Netherlands) Matwé Middelkoop	(Italy) Marco Bortolotti (Poland) Kamil Majchrzak	7–6^{(7–5)}, 6–4
2014	(Netherlands) Antal van der Duim (Netherlands) Boy Westerhof	(Republic of Ireland) James Cluskey (Netherlands) Jesse Huta Galung	7–6^{(7–3)}, 6–4
2013	(Italy) Alessandro Motti (France) Stéphane Robert	(Netherlands) Stephan Fransen (Netherlands) Wesley Koolhof	7–5, 7–5
2012	(Serbia) Nikola Ćirić (Serbia) Boris Pašanski	(Netherlands) Stephan Fransen (Netherlands) Jesse Huta Galung	5–7, 6–4, [10–6]
2011	(Spain) Daniel Muñoz de la Nava (Spain) Rubén Ramírez Hidalgo	(Spain) Gerard Granollers (Spain) Adrián Menéndez	6–4, 6–7^{(4–7)}, [13–11]
2010	(Spain) Daniel Muñoz de la Nava (Spain) Santiago Ventura	(Serbia) Nikola Ćirić (Spain) Guillermo Olaso	6–2, 7–5
2009	(Philippines) Treat Conrad Huey (India) Harsh Mankad	(Italy) Alberto Brizzi (Italy) Simone Vagnozzi	6–1, 7–5
2008	(Spain) David Marrero (Spain) Pablo Santos	(Brazil) Rogério Dutra da Silva (Brazil) Flávio Saretta	2–6, 6–2, [10–8]
2007	(Spain) Marcel Granollers (Spain) Santiago Ventura	(Spain) Miquel Pérez Puigdomènech (Spain) José Antonio Sánchez de Luna	6–3, 6–3
2006	(Spain) Pablo Andújar (Spain) Marcel Granollers	(United States) Hugo Armando (Spain) Carles Poch-Gradin	4–6, 6–3, [10–8]
2005	(Brazil) Marcos Daniel (Spain) Fernando Vicente	(Italy) Flavio Cipolla (Italy) Alessandro Motti	6–2, 6–7^{(1–7)}, 7–5
2004	(Germany) Tomas Behrend (Germany) Alexander Waske	(Spain) Óscar Hernández (Spain) Álex López Morón	7–6^{(7–0)}, 7–6^{(7–2)}
2003	(Spain) Óscar Hernández (Spain) Albert Portas	(Italy) Enzo Artoni (Argentina) Sergio Roitman	6–4, 4–6, 6–4
2002	(Argentina) Mariano Hood (Peru) Luis Horna	(Spain) Álex López Morón (Spain) Albert Portas	4–6, 6–1, 6–4
2001	(Italy) Stefano Galvani (Italy) Vincenzo Santopadre	(Spain) Marc López (Spain) Santiago Ventura	6–4, 6–4
2000	(Spain) Eduardo Nicolás (Spain) Germán Puentes	(Spain) Tommy Robredo (Spain) Santiago Ventura	6–3, 6–2
1999	(Argentina) Marcelo Charpentier (Puerto Rico) José Frontera	(Spain) Eduardo Nicolás (Spain) Germán Puentes	7–5, 6–3
1998	(Spain) Alberto Martín (Spain) Salvador Navarro	(Netherlands) Edwin Kempes (Netherlands) Rogier Wassen	2–6, 7–5, 6–3
1997	(Finland) Tuomas Ketola (Germany) Michael Kohlmann	(Spain) Emilio Benfele Álvarez (Spain) Pepe Imaz	4–6, 6–1, 6–3
1996	(Sweden) Ola Kristiansson (Belgium) Tom Vanhoudt	(Italy) Fabio Maggi (Spain) Juan Antonio Marín	6–0, 6–7, 6–1
1995	(Netherlands) Martijn Bok (Belgium) Tom Vanhoudt	(United States) Francisco Montana (Ivory Coast) Claude N'Goran	6–2, 6–2
1994	(Spain) Emilio Benfele Álvarez (Spain) Pepe Imaz	(Germany) Patrick Baur (Germany) Torben Theine	6–1, 6–3
1993	(Spain) Emilio Benfele Álvarez (Spain) Pepe Imaz	(United States) Steve Campbell (United States) John Yancey	6–7, 6–1, 6–2
1992	(Sweden) Christer Allgårdh (Sweden) Tomas Nydahl	(Chile) Sergio Cortés (Brazil) César Kist	6–3, 6–2
1991	(Czechoslovakia) David Rikl (France) Éric Winogradsky	(Czechoslovakia) Tomáš Anzari (Czechoslovakia) Josef Čihák	6–1, 6–7, 6–3
