= 2024 Braga Open – Singles =

Singles
- 2024 Braga Open

Final
- Champion: (Denmark) Elmer Møller
- Runner-up: (Colombia) Daniel Elahi Galán
- Score: 6–4, 7–6^{(7–4)}

Events
Singles	Doubles
← 2023 ·	Braga Open	· 2025 →

Oriol Roca Batalla was the defending champion but withdrew from the tournament before his first round match.

Elmer Møller won the title after defeating Daniel Elahi Galán 6–4, 7–6^{(7–4)} in the final.

== Seeds ==
1. (Argentina) Thiago Agustín Tirante (second round)
2. (Italy) Francesco Passaro (second round, withdrew)
3. (Chile) Cristian Garín (second round)
4. (Slovakia) Jozef Kovalík (first round, retired)
5. (Colombia) Daniel Elahi Galán (final)
6. (Spain) Albert Ramos Viñolas (semifinals)
7. (Czech Republic) Vít Kopřiva (quarterfinals)
8. (Chile) Tomás Barrios Vera (first round)

== Draw ==
=== Key ===
- Q = Qualifier
- WC = Wild card
- LL = Lucky loser
- Alt = Alternate
- ITF = ITF entry
- PR = Protected ranking
- SR = Special ranking
- SE = Special exempt
- JE = Junior exempt
- JR = Junior Accelerator Programme entrant
- CO = College Accelerator Programme entrant
- NG = Next Gen Accelerator Program entrant
- w/o = Walkover
- r = Retired
- d = Defaulted

=== Finals ===
Semifinals
5	(Colombia) Daniel Elahi Galán	7^{7}	6
(Italy) Andrea Pellegrino	6^{4}	1
6	(Spain) Albert Ramos Viñolas	5	6^{2}
Q	(Denmark) Elmer Møller	7	7^{7}

Final
5	(Colombia) Daniel Elahi Galán	4	6^{4}
Q	(Denmark) Elmer Møller	6	7^{7}

=== Top half ===
First round
1	(Argentina) TA Tirante	7^{7}	6
Q	(Croatia) M Dodig	6^{3}	4
(Portugal) H Rocha	3	1
Q	(Austria) L Neumayer	6	6
Q	(Portugal) J Domingues	7^{7}	6
WC	(Portugal) G Elias	6^{4}	1
Alt	(Romania) FC Jianu	4	4
5	(Colombia) DE Galán	6	6
4	(Slovakia) J Kovalík	3^{r}
LL	(France) C Tabur	4
(Belgium) R Collignon	4	7	4
Alt	(Spain) J Barranco Cosano	6	5	6
(Bulgaria) A Andreev	3	6	2
(Italy) A Pellegrino	6	1	6
(Lithuania) V Gaubas	6	4	7
8	(Chile) T Barrios Vera	4	6	5

Second round
1	(Argentina) TA Tirante	3	1
Q	(Austria) L Neumayer	6	6
Q	(Portugal) J Domingues	3	1
5	(Colombia) DE Galán	6	6
LL	(France) C Tabur	6	6
Alt	(Spain) J Barranco Cosano	3	3
(Italy) A Pellegrino	6	6
(Lithuania) V Gaubas	2	1

Quarterfinals
Q	(Austria) L Neumayer	4	2
5	(Colombia) DE Galán	6	6
LL	(France) C Tabur	6	5	3
(Italy) A Pellegrino	3	7	6

Semifinals
5	(Colombia) DE Galán	7^{7}	6
(Italy) A Pellegrino	6^{4}	1

=== Bottom half ===
First round
6	(Spain) A Ramos Viñolas	6	6
(Portugal) J Faria	2	4
(United States) Em Nava	6	4	6
WC	(Portugal) Pedro Araújo	2	6	3
(Spain) C Taberner	6	6
Q	(Czech Republic) H Bartoň	0	3
(United Kingdom) J Choinski	2	7^{7}	1
3	(Chile) C Garín	6	6^{5}	6
7	(Czech Republic) V Kopřiva	3	6	6
Q	(Ukraine) Eric Vanshelboim	6	2	1
(Peru) I Buse	7	6
(France) A Géa	5	3
Q	(Denmark) E Møller	6	6
WC	(Portugal) F Ferreira Silva	4	3
(Slovenia) Filip Jeff Planinšek	4	2
2	(Italy) F Passaro	6	6

Second round
6	(Spain) A Ramos Viñolas	3	6	6
(United States) Em Nava	6	1	3
(Spain) C Taberner	3	7	6
3	(Chile) C Garín	6	5	4
7	(Czech Republic) V Kopřiva	6	4	6
(Peru) I Buse	0	6	1
Q	(Denmark) E Møller	w/o
2	(Italy) F Passaro

Quarterfinals
6	(Spain) A Ramos Viñolas	6	6
(Spain) C Taberner	3	3
7	(Czech Republic) V Kopřiva	3	1
Q	(Denmark) E Møller	6	6

Semifinals
6	(Spain) A Ramos Viñolas	5	6^{2}
Q	(Denmark) E Møller	7	7^{7}
