= 2021 Braga Open – Singles =

Singles
- 2021 Braga Open

Final
- Champion: (Brazil) Thiago Monteiro
- Runner-up: (Serbia) Nikola Milojević
- Score: 7–5, 7–5

Events
Singles	Doubles
← 2019 ·	Braga Open	· 2022 →

João Domingues was the defending champion but lost in the first round to Jesper de Jong.

Thiago Monteiro won the title after defeating Nikola Milojević 7–5, 7–5 in the final.

== Seeds ==
1. (Brazil) Thiago Monteiro (champion)
2. (Japan) Taro Daniel (quarterfinals)
3. (France) Hugo Gaston (semifinals)
4. (Serbia) Nikola Milojević (final)
5. (Germany) Cedrik-Marcel Stebe (quarterfinals)
6. (Italy) Alessandro Giannessi (second round)
7. (Portugal) Frederico Ferreira Silva (first round)
8. (Canada) Steven Diez (first round, retired)

== Draw ==
=== Key ===
- Q = Qualifier
- WC = Wild card
- LL = Lucky loser
- Alt = Alternate
- SE = Special exempt
- PR = Protected ranking
- ITF = ITF entry
- JE = Junior exempt
- w/o = Walkover
- r = Retired
- d = Defaulted
- SR = Special ranking

=== Finals ===
Semifinals
1	(Brazil) Thiago Monteiro	6	6
3	(France) Hugo Gaston	4	1
4	(Serbia) Nikola Milojević	6	6
Q	(Spain) N Sánchez Izquierdo	2	4

Final
1	(Brazil) Thiago Monteiro	7	7
4	(Serbia) Nikola Milojević	5	5

=== Top half ===
First round
1	(Brazil) T Monteiro	6	6
Q	(Germany) Peter Heller	3	3
WC	(Portugal) T Cação	4	6	6
(Spain) R Ortega Olmedo	6	1	1
PR	(Belgium) J De Loore	4	6	3
(Italy) A Arnaboldi	6	4	6
(United States) T-S Kwiatkowski	7	6
7	(Portugal) F Ferreira Silva	5	3
3	(France) H Gaston	6	6
(Spain) J Barranco Cosano	4	0
WC	(Portugal) Pedro Araújo	6	6
WC	(Portugal) Luís Faria	2	4
(Netherlands) J de Jong	6	6
(Portugal) J Domingues	4	4
Q	(Japan) K Uchida	4	1
6	(Italy) A Giannessi	6	6

Second round
1	(Brazil) T Monteiro	6	6
WC	(Portugal) T Cação	1	1
(Italy) A Arnaboldi	6	6
(United States) T-S Kwiatkowski	4	1
3	(France) H Gaston	7^{7}	6
WC	(Portugal) P Araújo	6^{5}	3
(Netherlands) J de Jong	6	7
6	(Italy) A Giannessi	3	5

Quarterfinals
1	(Brazil) T Monteiro	4	6	6
(Italy) A Arnaboldi	6	4	2
3	(France) H Gaston	6	6
(Netherlands) J de Jong	3	1

Semifinals
1	(Brazil) T Monteiro	6	6
3	(France) H Gaston	4	1

=== Bottom half ===
First round
5	(Germany) C-M Stebe	6	3	6
(Italy) A Pellegrino	3	6	2
(Netherlands) I Sijsling	1	4
(Czech Republic) M Vrbenský	6	6
(Italy) G Zeppieri	4	4
Q	(Argentina) S Rodríguez Taverna	6	6
(Portugal) N Borges	3	6^{6}
4	(Serbia) N Milojević	6	7^{8}
8	(Canada) S Diez	1^{r}
Q	(Spain) N Sánchez Izquierdo	2
(Argentina) A Collarini	6	6
LL	(United States) A Rybakov	2	2
(Netherlands) R Haase	2	7^{7}	6
(Dominican Republic) R Cid Subervi	6	6^{5}	4
PR	(Italy) F Baldi	2	6	0
2	(Japan) T Daniel	6	4	6

Second round
5	(Germany) C-M Stebe	6	0
(Czech Republic) M Vrbenský	1	0^{r}
Q	(Argentina) S Rodríguez Taverna	3	6	5
4	(Serbia) N Milojević	6	3	7
Q	(Spain) N Sánchez Izquierdo	7	6
(Argentina) A Collarini	5	2
(Netherlands) R Haase	3	1
2	(Japan) T Daniel	6	6

Quarterfinals
5	(Germany) C-M Stebe	3	4
4	(Serbia) N Milojević	6	6
Q	(Spain) N Sánchez Izquierdo	6	6
2	(Japan) T Daniel	3	2

Semifinals
4	(Serbia) N Milojević	6	6
Q	(Spain) N Sánchez Izquierdo	2	4
