= 2023 Braga Open – Doubles =

Doubles
- 2023 Braga Open

Final
- Champions: (Italy) Marco Bortolotti (Romania) Alexandru Jecan
- Runners-up: (Italy) Stefano Travaglia (Italy) Alexander Weis
- Score: 7–5, 7–5

Events
Singles	Doubles
← 2022 ·	Braga Open	· 2024 →

Vít Kopřiva and Jaroslav Pospíšil were the defending champions but chose not to defend their title.

Marco Bortolotti and Alexandru Jecan won the title after defeating Stefano Travaglia and Alexander Weis 7–5, 7–5 in the final.

== Seeds ==
1. (Poland) Karol Drzewiecki / (Poland) Piotr Matuszewski (first round)
2. (Spain) Íñigo Cervantes / (Spain) Oriol Roca Batalla (semifinals)
3. (Italy) Marco Bortolotti / (Romania) Alexandru Jecan (champions)
4. (India) Purav Raja / (United States) Hunter Reese (first round)

== Draw ==
Key

- Q = Qualifier
- WC = Wild card
- LL = Lucky loser
- Alt = Alternate
- ITF = ITF entry
- PR = Protected ranking
- SR = Special ranking
- SE = Special exempt
- JE = Junior exempt
- JR = Junior Accelerator Programme entrant
- CO = College Accelerator Programme entrant
- NG = Next Gen Accelerator Program entrant
- w/o = Walkover
- r = Retired
- d = Defaulted

First round
1	(Poland) K Drzewiecki (Poland) P Matuszewski	4	6	[4]
WC	(Portugal) T Pereira (Portugal) D Vale	6	3	[10]
(Italy) S Travaglia (Italy) Alexander Weis	6	7
(Sweden) F Bergevi (Netherlands) M Veldheer	4	5
4	(India) P Raja (United States) H Reese	1	2
Alt	(Spain) J Barranco Cosano (Spain) P Llamas Ruiz	6	6
(Italy) F Agamenone (Italy) F Passaro	6	6
PR	(India) S Balaji (Germany) A Begemann	4	3
(India) N Kaliyanda Poonacha (India) D Sharan	4	6	[6]
(United Kingdom) S Duncan (United Kingdom) M Willis	6	4	[10]
(Italy) R Bonadio (Italy) A Giannessi	4	3
3	(Italy) M Bortolotti (Romania) A Jecan	6	6
(France) T Droguet (France) M Guinard	3	0^{r}
I Gakhov (Czech Republic) Z Kolář	6	0
WC	(Portugal) J Faria (Portugal) H Rocha	3	2
2	(Spain) Í Cervantes (Spain) O Roca Batalla	6	6

Quarterfinals
WC	(Portugal) T Pereira (Portugal) D Vale	4	4
(Italy) S Travaglia (Italy) A Weis	6	6
Alt	(Spain) J Barranco Cosano (Spain) P Llamas Ruiz	7^{15}	6
(Italy) F Agamenone (Italy) F Passaro	6^{13}	4
(United Kingdom) S Duncan (United Kingdom) M Willis	4	6	[7]
3	(Italy) M Bortolotti (Romania) A Jecan	6	3	[10]
I Gakhov (Czech Republic) Z Kolář	5	1
2	(Spain) Í Cervantes (Spain) O Roca Batalla	7	6

Semifinals
(Italy) S Travaglia (Italy) A Weis	6^{4}	6	[10]
Alt	(Spain) J Barranco Cosano (Spain) P Llamas Ruiz	7^{7}	4	[8]
3	(Italy) M Bortolotti (Romania) A Jecan	4	6	[10]
2	(Spain) Í Cervantes (Spain) O Roca Batalla	6	3	[8]

Final
(Italy) S Travaglia (Italy) A Weis	5	5
3	(Italy) M Bortolotti (Romania) A Jecan	7	7
