= 2019 Braga Open – Singles =

Singles
- 2019 Braga Open

Final
- Champion: (Portugal) João Domingues
- Runner-up: (Argentina) Facundo Bagnis
- Score: 6–7^{(5–7)}, 6–2, 6–3

Events
Singles	Doubles
← 2018 ·	Braga Open	· 2021 →

Pedro Sousa was the defending champion but withdrew before the tournament began due to injury.

João Domingues won the title after defeating Facundo Bagnis 6–7^{(5–7)}, 6–2, 6–3 in the final.

== Seeds ==
All seeds receive a bye into the second round.

1. (United States) Bjorn Fratangelo (second round)
2. (Argentina) Facundo Bagnis (final)
3. (United States) Mitchell Krueger (second round)
4. (Belgium) Arthur De Greef (second round)
5. (Estonia) Jürgen Zopp (third round)
6. (Germany) Dominik Köpfer (quarterfinals)
7. (Belgium) Kimmer Coppejans (third round)
8. (Ecuador) Emilio Gómez (third round)
9. (Slovenia) Blaž Rola (third round, withdrew)
10. (Slovakia) Norbert Gombos (quarterfinals)
11. (Netherlands) Tallon Griekspoor (quarterfinals)
12. (Spain) Sergio Gutiérrez Ferrol (second round, retired)
13. (Portugal) João Domingues (champion)
14. (Germany) Mats Moraing (withdrew)
15. (Russia) Evgeny Karlovskiy (second round)
16. (Czech Republic) Zdeněk Kolář (semifinals)
17. (Spain) Tommy Robredo (second round)

== Draw ==
=== Key ===
- Q = Qualifier
- WC = Wild card
- LL = Lucky loser
- Alt = Alternate
- SE = Special exempt
- PR = Protected ranking
- ITF = ITF entry
- JE = Junior exempt
- w/o = Walkover
- r = Retired
- d = Defaulted
- SR = Special ranking

=== Finals ===
Quarterfinals
(Spain) Bernabé Zapata Miralles	6	6
6	(Germany) Dominik Köpfer	2	4
13	(Portugal) João Domingues	6	2	6
10	(Slovakia) Norbert Gombos	3	6	2
(France) Geoffrey Blancaneaux	6	3	2
16	(Czech Republic) Zdeněk Kolář	3	6	6
11	(Netherlands) Tallon Griekspoor	7^{7}	4	4
2	(Argentina) Facundo Bagnis	6^{1}	6	6

Semifinals
(Spain) Bernabé Zapata Miralles	0	0
13	(Portugal) João Domingues	6	6
16	(Czech Republic) Zdeněk Kolář	2	0
2	(Argentina) Facundo Bagnis	6	6

Final
13	(Portugal) João Domingues	6^{5}	6	6
2	(Argentina) Facundo Bagnis	7^{7}	2	3

=== Top half ===
==== Section 1 ====
First round
Q	(Portugal) Daniel Batista	1	0
(Portugal) F Ferreira Silva	6	6
(Netherlands) T de Bakker	6	3	0^{r}
(Spain) B Zapata Miralles	0	6	3
(Colombia) A González	1	4
(France) B Bonzi	6	6
(Netherlands) J Sels	6	2	0
ITF	(Czech Republic) V Kopřiva	1	6	6

Second round
1	(United States) B Fratangelo	2	6	3
(Portugal) F Ferreira Silva	6	2	6
(Spain) B Zapata Miralles	6	6
15	(Russia) E Karlovskiy	1	4
9	(Slovenia) B Rola	7^{7}	6
(France) B Bonzi	6^{4}	3
ITF	(Czech Republic) V Kopřiva	4	2
6	(Germany) D Köpfer	6	6

Third round
(Portugal) F Ferreira Silva	7^{7}	6^{7}	4
(Spain) B Zapata Miralles	6^{3}	7^{9}	6
9	(Slovenia) B Rola
6	(Germany) D Köpfer	w/o

Quarterfinals
(Spain) B Zapata Miralles	6	6
6	(Germany) D Köpfer	2	4

==== Section 2 ====
First round
ITF	(Brazil) J Menezes	6	6
(Egypt) M Safwat	2	2
Q	(Netherlands) S Verbeek	1	2
ITF	(Spain) O Roca Batalla	6	6
(Vietnam) NH Lý	6	2	6^{5}
WC	(Chinese Taipei) C-h Tseng	4	6	7^{7}
(Uruguay) M Cuevas	6	6
WC	(Portugal) F Gil	4	0

Second round
3	(United States) M Krueger	5	2
ITF	(Brazil) J Menezes	7	6
ITF	(Spain) O Roca Batalla	2	4
13	(Portugal) J Domingues	6	6
10	(Slovakia) N Gombos	6	6
WC	(Chinese Taipei) C-h Tseng	1	3
(Uruguay) M Cuevas	3	5
8	(Ecuador) E Gómez	6	7

Third round
ITF	(Brazil) J Menezes	6	3	5
13	(Portugal) J Domingues	3	6	7
10	(Slovakia) N Gombos	2	6	6
8	(Ecuador) E Gómez	6	4	1

Quarterfinals
13	(Portugal) J Domingues	6	2	6
10	(Slovakia) N Gombos	3	6	2

=== Bottom half ===
==== Section 3 ====
First round
WC	(Portugal) T Cação	6	6
WC	(Portugal) F Cabral	2	2
(France) G Blancaneaux	6	6
Alt	(Venezuela) LD Martínez	1	0
Alt	(Czech Republic) J Pospíšil	0	4
(Argentina) P Cachin	6	6
(Spain) C Taberner	6	6
(Spain) P Toledo Bagué	3	4

Second round
5	(Estonia) J Zopp	7	6
WC	(Portugal) T Cação	5	2
(France) G Blancaneaux	6	1
12	(Spain) S Gutiérrez Ferrol	1	0^{r}
16	(Czech Republic) Z Kolář	6	5	6
(Argentina) P Cachin	2	7	4
(Spain) C Taberner	7^{7}	6
4	(Belgium) A De Greef	6^{4}	1

Third round
5	(Estonia) J Zopp	2	4
(France) G Blancaneaux	6	6
16	(Czech Republic) Z Kolář	6	6
(Spain) C Taberner	3	0

Quarterfinals
(France) G Blancaneaux	6	3	2
16	(Czech Republic) Z Kolář	3	6	6

==== Section 4 ====
First round
(Portugal) G Elias	6	2	1
ITF	(Brazil) O Luz	1	6	6
(Spain) G Granollers	7	7
WC	(Portugal) Luís Faria	5	5
LL	(Portugal) Gonçalo Falcão	0	1
(Spain) M Vilella Martínez	6	6
(Czech Republic) Pavel Nejedlý	6	6
ITF	(Spain) D Pérez Sanz	1	3

Second round
7	(Belgium) K Coppejans	6	6
ITF	(Brazil) O Luz	1	1
(Spain) G Granollers	2	3
11	(Netherlands) T Griekspoor	6	6
17	(Spain) T Robredo	6^{5}	4
(Spain) M Vilella Martínez	7^{7}	6
(Czech Republic) P Nejedlý	1	2
2	(Argentina) F Bagnis	6	6

Third round
7	(Belgium) K Coppejans	3	6	2
11	(Netherlands) T Griekspoor	6	3	6
(Spain) M Vilella Martínez	3	6^{4}
2	(Argentina) F Bagnis	6	7^{7}

Quarterfinals
11	(Netherlands) T Griekspoor	7^{7}	4	4
2	(Argentina) F Bagnis	6^{1}	6	6
