= 2026 Braga Open – Singles =

Singles
- 2026 Braga Open

Final
- Champion: (Croatia) Matej Dodig
- Runner-up: (Denmark) Elmer Møller
- Score: 3–6, 6–3, 6–2

Events
Singles	Doubles
- Braga Open

Luka Mikrut was the defending champion but lost in the quarterfinals to Vilius Gaubas.

Matej Dodig won the title after defeating Elmer Møller 3–6, 6–3, 6–2 in the final.

== Seeds ==
1. (Hungary) Zsombor Piros (second round)
2. (Spain) Max Alcalá Gurri (quarterfinals)
3. (Lithuania) Vilius Gaubas (semifinals)
4. (Italy) Andrea Pellegrino (first round)
5. (Spain) Nikolás Sánchez Izquierdo (second round)
6. (Italy) Marco Cecchinato (first round)
7. (Croatia) Luka Mikrut (quarterfinals)
8. (United States) Mackenzie McDonald (first round)

== Draw ==
Key

- Q = Qualifier
- WC = Wild card
- LL = Lucky loser
- Alt = Alternate
- ITF = ITF entry
- PR = Protected ranking
- SR = Special ranking
- SE = Special exempt
- JE = Junior exempt
- JR = Junior Accelerator Programme entrant
- CO = College Accelerator Programme entrant
- NG = Next Gen Accelerator Program entrant
- w/o = Walkover
- r = Retired
- d = Defaulted

=== Finals ===
Semifinals
(Denmark) Elmer Møller	6	4	6
3	(Lithuania) Vilius Gaubas	2	6	4
(Croatia) Matej Dodig	6	6
(Austria) Lukas Neumayer	3	1

Final
(Denmark) Elmer Møller	6	3	2
(Croatia) Matej Dodig	3	6	6

=== Top half ===
First round
1	(Hungary) Z Piros	6	5	6
(United States) T Boyer	2	7	4
(Brazil) T Monteiro	6^{0}	7	4
(Denmark) E Møller	7^{7}	5	6
(Portugal) T Pereira	6	6
(Spain) P Martín Tiffon	3	4
WC	(Portugal) Gonçalo Marques	3	4
5	(Spain) N Sánchez Izquierdo	6	6
3	(Lithuania) V Gaubas	6	7
WC	(Portugal) J Domingues	1	5
(Croatia) D Ajduković	6	6
(Romania) FC Jianu	2	2
Q	(Ukraine) O Krutykh	1	6	6
Q	(Spain) J Barranco Cosano	6	4	4
(India) S Nagal	2	4
7	(Croatia) L Mikrut	6	6

Second round
1	(Hungary) Z Piros	6	1	5
(Denmark) E Møller	1	6	7
(Portugal) T Pereira	7	6
5	(Spain) N Sánchez Izquierdo	5	3
3	(Lithuania) V Gaubas	5	7^{7}	6
(Croatia) D Ajduković	7	6^{4}	2
Q	(Ukraine) O Krutykh	7^{7}	4	4
7	(Croatia) L Mikrut	6^{4}	6	6

Quarterfinals
(Denmark) E Møller	5	6	6
(Portugal) T Pereira	7	2	1
3	(Lithuania) V Gaubas	6	6
7	(Croatia) L Mikrut	2	4

Semifinals
(Denmark) E Møller	6	4	6
3	(Lithuania) V Gaubas	2	6	4

=== Bottom half ===
First round
8	(United States) M McDonald	1	6	3
Q	(Netherlands) Ryan Nijboer	6	4	6
(Germany) M Möller	6	6
WC	(Portugal) T Torres	4	4
Q	(Switzerland) J Nikles	4	3
(Spain) M Damas	6	6
(Croatia) M Dodig	6	3	6
4	(Italy) A Pellegrino	3	6	1
6	(Italy) M Cecchinato	6^{4}	0
Q	(Sweden) O Wallin	7^{7}	6
(Germany) F Broska	6	3	2
(Austria) L Neumayer	4	6	6
Q	(Switzerland) Patrick Schön	6	7^{7}
(Bosnia and Herzegovina) A Nedić	1	6^{1}
(United States) Dali Blanch	1	2
2	(Spain) M Alcalá Gurri	6	6

Second round
Q	(Netherlands) R Nijboer	3	3
(Germany) M Möller	6	6
(Spain) M Damas	4	1
(Croatia) M Dodig	6	6
Q	(Sweden) O Wallin	2	2
(Austria) L Neumayer	6	6
Q	(Switzerland) P Schön	1	0
2	(Spain) M Alcalá Gurri	6	6

Quarterfinals
(Germany) M Möller	2	3
(Croatia) M Dodig	6	6
(Austria) L Neumayer	6^{6}	6	6
2	(Spain) M Alcalá Gurri	7^{8}	2	2

Semifinals
(Croatia) M Dodig	6	6
(Austria) L Neumayer	3	1
