= 2024 Braga Open =

- Date: 30 September – 6 October
- Edition: 6th
- Draw: 32S / 16D
- Surface: Clay
- Location: Braga, Portugal

Champions

Singles
- (Denmark) Elmer Møller

Doubles
- (France) Théo Arribagé / (Portugal) Francisco Cabral
| ← 2023 · | Braga Open | · 2025 → |

The 2024 Braga Open was a professional tennis tournament played on clay courts. It was the sixth edition of the tournament which was part of the 2024 ATP Challenger Tour. It took place in Braga, Portugal between 30 September and 6 October 2024.

== Singles main-draw entrants ==
=== Seeds ===
| Country | Player | Rank^{1} | Seed |
|---|---|---|---|
| ARG | Thiago Agustín Tirante | 97 | 1 |
| ITA | Francesco Passaro | 109 | 2 |
| CHI | Cristian Garín | 119 | 3 |
| SVK | Jozef Kovalík | 123 | 4 |
| COL | Daniel Elahi Galán | 127 | 5 |
| ESP | Albert Ramos Viñolas | 133 | 6 |
| CZE | Vít Kopřiva | 143 | 7 |
| CHI | Tomás Barrios Vera | 159 | 8 |

- ^{1} Rankings are as of 23 September 2024.

=== Other entrants ===
The following players received wildcards into the singles main draw:

- (Portugal) Pedro Araújo
- (Portugal) Gastão Elias
- (Portugal) Frederico Ferreira Silva

The following players received entry into the singles main draw as alternates:

- (Spain) Javier Barranco Cosano
- (Romania) Filip Cristian Jianu

The following players received entry from the qualifying draw:

- (Czech Republic) Hynek Bartoň
- (Croatia) Matej Dodig
- (Portugal) João Domingues
- (Denmark) Elmer Møller
- (Austria) Lukas Neumayer
- (Ukraine) Eric Vanshelboim

The following player received entry as a lucky loser:

- (France) Clément Tabur

== Champions ==
=== Singles ===
- (Denmark) Elmer Møller def. (Colombia) Daniel Elahi Galán 6–4, 7–6^{(7–4)}.

=== Doubles ===
- (France) Théo Arribagé / (Portugal) Francisco Cabral def. (Italy) Marco Bortolotti / (Israel) Daniel Cukierman 6–3, 6–4.
