= 2024 Braga Open – Doubles =

Doubles
- 2024 Braga Open

Final
- Champions: (France) Théo Arribagé (Portugal) Francisco Cabral
- Runners-up: (Italy) Marco Bortolotti (Israel) Daniel Cukierman
- Score: 6–3, 6–4

Events
| Singles | Doubles |
| ← 2023 · | Braga Open | · 2025 → |

Marco Bortolotti and Alexandru Jecan were the defending champions but chose to defend their title with different partners. Bortolotti partnered Daniel Cukierman but lost in the final to Théo Arribagé and Francisco Cabral. Jecan partnered Ivan Liutarevich but lost in the semifinals to Arribagé and Cabral.

Arribagé and Cabral won the title after defeating Bortolotti and Cukierman 6–3, 6–4 in the final.

== Seeds ==
1. (Romania) Victor Vlad Cornea / (Ukraine) Denys Molchanov (first round)
2. (France) Théo Arribagé / (Portugal) Francisco Cabral (champions)
3. (United States) George Goldhoff / (Brazil) Fernando Romboli (first round)
4. (Sweden) Filip Bergevi / (Netherlands) Mick Veldheer (quarterfinals)

== Draw ==
Key

- Q = Qualifier
- WC = Wild card
- LL = Lucky loser
- Alt = Alternate
- ITF = ITF entry
- PR = Protected ranking
- SR = Special ranking
- SE = Special exempt
- JE = Junior exempt
- JR = Junior Accelerator Programme entrant
- CO = College Accelerator Programme entrant
- NG = Next Gen Accelerator Program entrant
- w/o = Walkover
- r = Retired
- d = Defaulted

=== Draw ===
First round
1 | (Romania) V Cornea (Ukraine) D Molchanov | 6 | 6^{4} | [11]
Alt | (Czech Republic) H Bartoň (Czech Republic) V Kopřiva | 3 | 7^{7} | [13]
(Italy) M Bortolotti (Israel) D Cukierman | 7 | 6
(Colombia) DE Galán (Spain) C Taberner | 5 | 1
3 | (United States) G Goldhoff (Brazil) F Romboli | 3 | 6 | [2]
(Serbia) I Sabanov (Serbia) M Sabanov | 6 | 2 | [10]
(Spain) S Martos Gornés (Poland) S Walków | 6^{1} | 6 | [6]
WC | (Portugal) T Pereira (Portugal) D Vale | 7^{7} | 3 | [10]
(Italy) G Ricca (Italy) F Romano | 4 | 5
(Romania) A Jecan; I Liutarevich | 6 | 7
(Austria) N Oberleitner (Italy) Augusto Virgili | 3 | 5
4 | (Sweden) F Bergevi (Netherlands) M Veldheer | 6 | 7
WC | (Portugal) Pedro Araújo (Portugal) J Domingues | 6 | 6
Alt | (Bulgaria) A Andreev (Romania) FC Jianu | 1 | 1
(United States) V Kirkov (United States) E Nava | 6 | 3 | [5]
2 | (France) T Arribagé (Portugal) F Cabral | 4 | 6 | [10]

Quarterfinals
Alt | (Czech Republic) H Bartoň (Czech Republic) V Kopřiva | 0 | 4
(Italy) M Bortolotti (Israel) D Cukierman | 6 | 6
(Serbia) I Sabanov (Serbia) M Sabanov | 6 | 6
WC | (Portugal) T Pereira (Portugal) D Vale | 1 | 3
(Romania) A Jecan; I Liutarevich | 6 | 6
4 | (Sweden) F Bergevi (Netherlands) M Veldheer | 0 | 4
WC | (Portugal) P Araújo (Portugal) J Domingues | 2 | 1
2 | (France) T Arribagé (Portugal) F Cabral | 6 | 6

Semifinals
(Italy) M Bortolotti (Israel) D Cukierman | 6 | 6
(Serbia) I Sabanov (Serbia) M Sabanov | 2 | 4
(Romania) A Jecan; I Liutarevich | 4 | 5
2 | (France) T Arribagé (Portugal) F Cabral | 6 | 7

Final
(Italy) M Bortolotti (Israel) D Cukierman | 3 | 4
2 | (France) T Arribagé (Portugal) F Cabral | 6 | 6
