= 2023 Braga Open =

- Date: 24 September – 1 October
- Edition: 5th
- Draw: 32S / 16D
- Surface: Clay
- Location: Braga, Portugal

Champions

Singles
- (Spain) Oriol Roca Batalla

Doubles
- (Italy) Marco Bortolotti / (Romania) Alexandru Jecan
← 2022 ·	Braga Open	· 2024 →

The 2023 Braga Open was a professional tennis tournament played on clay courts. It was the fifth edition of the tournament which was part of the 2023 ATP Challenger Tour. It took place in Braga, Portugal between 24 September and 1 October 2023.

== Singles main-draw entrants ==
=== Seeds ===
Country	Player	Rank^{1}	Seed
HUN	Zsombor Piros	110	1
KAZ	Timofey Skatov	123	2
GBR	Jan Choinski	134	3
ESP	Pablo Llamas Ruiz	135	4
	Ivan Gakhov	163	5
FRA	Titouan Droguet	165	6
CZE	Zdeněk Kolář	171	7
ITA	Matteo Gigante	173	8

- ^{1} Rankings are as of 18 September 2023.

=== Other entrants ===
The following players received wildcards into the singles main draw:

- (Portugal) Gastão Elias
- (Portugal) Jaime Faria
- (Portugal) Henrique Rocha

The following player received entry into the singles main draw as an alternate:

- (Portugal) João Sousa

The following players received entry from the qualifying draw:

- (Spain) Javier Barranco Cosano
- (Portugal) João Domingues
- (Tunisia) Moez Echargui
- (Spain) Oriol Roca Batalla
- (Spain) Carlos Sánchez Jover
- (Germany) Timo Stodder

== Champions ==
=== Singles ===
- (Spain) Oriol Roca Batalla def. (Croatia) Duje Ajduković 4–6, 6–1, 6–1.

=== Doubles ===
- (Italy) Marco Bortolotti / (Romania) Alexandru Jecan def. (Italy) Stefano Travaglia / (Italy) Alexander Weis 7–5, 7–5.
