= 2023 Braga Open – Singles =

Singles
- 2023 Braga Open

Final
- Champion: (Spain) Oriol Roca Batalla
- Runner-up: (Croatia) Duje Ajduković
- Score: 4–6, 6–1, 6–1

Events
Singles	Doubles
- Braga Open

Nicolas Moreno de Alboran was the defending champion but chose not to defend his title.

Oriol Roca Batalla won the title after defeating Duje Ajduković 4–6, 6–1, 6–1 in the final.

== Seeds ==
1. (Hungary) Zsombor Piros (second round, withdrew)
2. (Kazakhstan) Timofey Skatov (first round)
3. (United Kingdom) Jan Choinski (first round)
4. (Spain) Pablo Llamas Ruiz (quarterfinals)
5. Ivan Gakhov (first round)
6. (France) Titouan Droguet (quarterfinals)
7. (Czech Republic) Zdeněk Kolář (first round)
8. (Italy) Matteo Gigante (second round)

== Draw ==
Key

- Q = Qualifier
- WC = Wild card
- LL = Lucky loser
- Alt = Alternate
- ITF = ITF entry
- PR = Protected ranking
- SR = Special ranking
- SE = Special exempt
- JE = Junior exempt
- JR = Junior Accelerator Programme entrant
- CO = College Accelerator Programme entrant
- NG = Next Gen Accelerator Program entrant
- w/o = Walkover
- r = Retired
- d = Defaulted

=== Finals ===
Semifinals
(Hungary) Máté Valkusz	7	1	4
(Croatia) Duje Ajduković	5	6	6
(Lebanon) Benjamin Hassan	6^{1}	4
Q	(Spain) Oriol Roca Batalla	7^{7}	6

Final
(Croatia) Duje Ajduković	6	1	1
Q	(Spain) Oriol Roca Batalla	4	6	6

=== Top half ===
First round
1	(Hungary) Z Piros	3	7	6
(Switzerland) K Feldbausch	6	5	3
(Italy) F Passaro	3	4
(Hungary) M Valkusz	6	6
(Italy) F Agamenone	6	7
(Italy) F Maestrelli	4	5
WC	(Portugal) H Rocha	3	1
6	(France) T Droguet	6	6
3	(United Kingdom) J Choinski	6	3	3
(Croatia) D Ajduković	1	6	6
WC	(Portugal) G Elias	6^{2}	4
(Italy) A Giannessi	7^{7}	6
Q	(Spain) J Barranco Cosano	6	6
(Italy) S Travaglia	1	4
(France) G Blancaneaux	7	3	6
7	(Czech Republic) Z Kolář	5	6	3

Second round
1	(Hungary) Z Piros
(Hungary) M Valkusz	w/o
(Italy) F Agamenone	5	3
6	(France) T Droguet	7	6
(Croatia) D Ajduković	7	5	6
(Italy) A Giannessi	5	7	2
Q	(Spain) J Barranco Cosano	6^{4}	2
(France) G Blancaneaux	7^{7}	6

Quarterfinals
(Hungary) M Valkusz	7^{14}	6
6	(France) T Droguet	6^{12}	3
(Croatia) D Ajduković	6	6
(France) G Blancaneaux	4	2

Semifinals
(Hungary) M Valkusz	7	1	4
(Croatia) D Ajduković	5	6	6

=== Bottom half ===
First round
8	(Italy) M Gigante	6	6
(Italy) Edoardo Lavagno	3	4
(Lebanon) B Hassan	6	4	6
Q	(Germany) Timo Stodder	4	6	4
(Bosnia and Herzegovina) N Fatić	3	1^{r}
Q	(Spain) C Sánchez Jover	6	3
(Italy) R Bonadio	1	2
4	(Spain) P Llamas Ruiz	6	6
5	I Gakhov	3	3
Q	(Spain) O Roca Batalla	6	6
Q	(Portugal) J Domingues	2	1
(South Korea) G Campaña Lee	6	6
Alt	(Portugal) J Sousa	6	4	4
Q	(Tunisia) M Echargui	2	6	6
WC	(Portugal) J Faria	6	5	6
2	(Kazakhstan) T Skatov	1	7	4

Second round
8	(Italy) M Gigante	4	6	1
(Lebanon) B Hassan	6	1	6
Q	(Spain) C Sánchez Jover	0	1
4	(Spain) P Llamas Ruiz	6	6
Q	(Spain) O Roca Batalla	6	6
(South Korea) G Campaña Lee	2	2
Q	(Tunisia) M Echargui	3	4
WC	(Portugal) J Faria	6	6

Quarterfinals
(Lebanon) B Hassan	7^{7}	6
4	(Spain) P Llamas Ruiz	6^{1}	0
Q	(Spain) O Roca Batalla	6	6
WC	(Portugal) J Faria	4	1

Semifinals
(Lebanon) B Hassan	6^{1}	4
Q	(Spain) O Roca Batalla	7^{7}	6
