= 2022 Braga Open – Singles =

Singles
- 2022 Braga Open

Final
- Champion: (United States) Nicolas Moreno de Alboran
- Runner-up: (Brazil) Matheus Pucinelli de Almeida
- Score: 6–2, 6–4

Events
Singles	Doubles
- Braga Open

Thiago Monteiro was the defending champion but chose not to defend his title.

Nicolas Moreno de Alboran won the title after defeating Matheus Pucinelli de Almeida 6–2, 6–4 in the final.

== Seeds ==
1. (Portugal) Nuno Borges (second round)
2. (Spain) Carlos Taberner (quarterfinals)
3. (Italy) Franco Agamenone (first round)
4. (France) Alexandre Müller (second round)
5. (France) Manuel Guinard (second round)
6. (Czech Republic) Vít Kopřiva (first round)
7. Alexander Shevchenko (quarterfinals)
8. (France) Benoît Paire (second round, retired)

== Draw ==
Key

- Q = Qualifier
- WC = Wild card
- LL = Lucky loser
- Alt = Alternate
- ITF = ITF entry
- PR = Protected ranking
- SR = Special ranking
- SE = Special exempt
- JE = Junior exempt
- JR = Junior Accelerator Programme entrant
- CO = College Accelerator Programme entrant
- NG = Next Gen Accelerator Program entrant
- w/o = Walkover
- r = Retired
- d = Defaulted

=== Finals ===
Semifinals
(Brazil) Matheus Pucinelli de Almeida	6	6
(Netherlands) Jelle Sels	2	2
Q	(United States) Nicolas Moreno de Alboran	3	7	6
(Kazakhstan) Timofey Skatov	6	5	2

Final
(Brazil) Matheus Pucinelli de Almeida	2	4
Q	(United States) Nicolas Moreno de Alboran	6	6

=== Top half ===
First round
1	(Portugal) N Borges	6	6
(Italy) GM Moroni	3	4
(Brazil) M Pucinelli de Almeida	6	6
Q	(Germany) Jeremy Jahn	4	4
Q	(Spain) P Llamas Ruiz	3	6	6
WC	(Portugal) Pedro Araújo	6	1	2
(Portugal) J Domingues	5	6	6
6	(Czech Republic) V Kopřiva	7	4	2
3	(Italy) F Agamenone	3	6^{7}
(Netherlands) J Sels	6	7^{9}
WC	(Portugal) G Oliveira	6	7^{7}
Q	(France) U Blanchet	1	6^{3}
(Croatia) N Serdarušić	7	6
Q	(Spain) Imanol López Morillo	5	3
(Belgium) M Geerts	2	0^{r}
7	A Shevchenko	6	3

Second round
1	(Portugal) N Borges	2	4
(Brazil) M Pucinelli de Almeida	6	6
Q	(Spain) P Llamas Ruiz	7^{7}	6
(Portugal) J Domingues	6^{2}	0
(Netherlands) J Sels	w/o
WC	(Portugal) G Oliveira
(Croatia) N Serdarušić	5	4
7	A Shevchenko	7	6

Quarterfinals
(Brazil) M Pucinelli de Almeida	6	6
Q	(Spain) P Llamas Ruiz	3	3
(Netherlands) J Sels	7^{7}	7^{11}
7	A Shevchenko	6^{1}	6^{9}

Semifinals
(Brazil) M Pucinelli de Almeida	6	6
(Netherlands) J Sels	2	2

=== Bottom half ===
First round
8	(France) B Paire	3	6	6
WC	(Portugal) D Vale	6	3	2
Q	(Spain) J Barranco Cosano	6	7
LL	(Croatia) D Ajduković	3	5
Q	(United States) N Moreno de Alboran	7^{7}	6
(Argentina) M Trungelliti	6^{1}	2
(Poland) D Michalski	6^{4}	2
4	(France) A Müller	7^{7}	6
5	(France) M Guinard	6	6
(Italy) L Giustino	2	4
(Dominican Republic) N Hardt	4	0
(Kazakhstan) T Skatov	6	6
(Portugal) F Ferreira Silva	2	5
(Spain) N Sánchez Izquierdo	6	7
(Portugal) G Elias	3	6	4
2	(Spain) C Taberner	6	4	6

Second round
8	(France) B Paire	5	0^{r}
Q	(Spain) J Barranco Cosano	7	4
Q	(United States) N Moreno de Alboran	4	6	6
4	(France) A Müller	6	3	4
5	(France) M Guinard	1	0
(Kazakhstan) T Skatov	6	6
(Spain) N Sánchez Izquierdo	2	4
2	(Spain) C Taberner	6	6

Quarterfinals
Q	(Spain) J Barranco Cosano	6^{6}	5
Q	(United States) N Moreno de Alboran	7^{8}	7
(Kazakhstan) T Skatov	7^{7}	6
2	(Spain) C Taberner	6^{2}	0

Semifinals
Q	(United States) N Moreno de Alboran	3	7	6
(Kazakhstan) T Skatov	6	5	2
