= 2026 Braga Open =

- Date: 5 – 11 October
- Edition: 8th
- Draw: 32S / 16D
- Surface: Clay
- Location: Braga, Portugal

Champions

Singles
- (Croatia) Matej Dodig

Doubles
- (Morocco) Younes Lalami / (Spain) Mario Mansilla Díez
- Braga Open

The 2026 Braga Open was a professional tennis tournament played on clay courts. It was the eighth edition of the tournament which was part of the 2026 ATP Challenger Tour. It took place in Braga, Portugal between 5 and 11 October 2026.

== Singles main-draw entrants ==
=== Seeds ===
Country	Player	Rank^{1}	Seed
HUN	Zsombor Piros	113	1
ESP	Max Alcalá Gurri	138	2
LTU	Vilius Gaubas	141	3
ITA	Andrea Pellegrino	145	4
ESP	Nikolás Sánchez Izquierdo	156	5
ITA	Marco Cecchinato	161	6
CRO	Luka Mikrut	166	7
USA	Mackenzie McDonald	167	8

- ^{1} Rankings are as of 28 September 2026.

=== Other entrants ===
The following players received wildcards into the singles main draw:

- (Portugal) João Domingues
- (Portugal) Gonçalo Marques
- (Portugal) Tiago Torres

The following players received entry from the qualifying draw:

- (Spain) Javier Barranco Cosano
- (Ukraine) Oleksii Krutykh
- (Netherlands) Ryan Nijboer
- (Switzerland) Johan Nikles
- (Switzerland) Patrick Schön
- (Sweden) Olle Wallin

== Champions ==
=== Singles ===
- (Croatia) Matej Dodig def. (Denmark) Elmer Møller 3–6, 6–3, 6–2.

=== Doubles ===
- (Morocco) Younes Lalami / (Spain) Mario Mansilla Díez def. (Poland) Karol Drzewiecki / (Croatia) Admir Kalender 6–3, 2–6, [16–14].
