= 2019 Braga Open =

- Date: 6–12 May
- Edition: 2nd
- Draw: 48S / 16D
- Surface: Clay
- Location: Braga, Portugal

Champions

Singles
- (Portugal) João Domingues

Doubles
- (Spain) Gerard Granollers / (Brazil) Fabrício Neis
← 2018 ·	Braga Open	· 2021 →

The 2019 Braga Open was a professional tennis tournament played on clay courts. It was the second edition of the tournament which was part of the 2019 ATP Challenger Tour. It took place in Braga, Portugal between 6 and 12 May 2019.

== Singles main-draw entrants ==
=== Seeds ===
Country	Player	Rank^{1}	Seed
USA	Bjorn Fratangelo	140	1
ARG	Facundo Bagnis	156	2
USA	Mitchell Krueger	174	3
BEL	Arthur De Greef	176	4
EST	Jürgen Zopp	180	5
GER	Dominik Köpfer	181	6
BEL	Kimmer Coppejans	184	7
ECU	Emilio Gómez	197	8
SLO	Blaž Rola	207	9
SVK	Norbert Gombos	208	10
NED	Tallon Griekspoor	211	11
ESP	Sergio Gutiérrez Ferrol	212	12
POR	João Domingues	214	13
~~GER~~	~~Mats Moraing~~	~~222~~	~~14~~
RUS	Evgeny Karlovskiy	223	15
CZE	Zdeněk Kolář	224	16
ESP	Tommy Robredo	228	17

- ^{1} Rankings are as of 29 April 2019.

=== Other entrants ===
The following players received wildcards into the singles main draw:

- (Portugal) Francisco Cabral
- (Portugal) Tiago Cação
- (Portugal) Luís Faria
- (Portugal) Fred Gil
- (Chinese Taipei) Tseng Chun-hsin

The following players received entry into the singles main draw as alternates:

- (Venezuela) Luis David Martínez
- (Czech Republic) Jaroslav Pospíšil

The following players received entry into the singles main draw using their ITF World Tennis Ranking:

- (Czech Republic) Vít Kopřiva
- (Brazil) Orlando Luz
- (Brazil) João Menezes
- (Spain) David Pérez Sanz
- (Spain) Oriol Roca Batalla

The following players received entry from the qualifying draw:

- (Portugal) Daniel Batista
- (Netherlands) Sem Verbeek

The following player received entry as a lucky loser:

- (Portugal) Gonçalo Falcão

== Champions ==
=== Singles ===
- (Portugal) João Domingues def. (Argentina) Facundo Bagnis 6–7^{(5–7)}, 6–2, 6–3.

=== Doubles ===
- (Spain) Gerard Granollers / (Brazil) Fabrício Neis def. (Belgium) Kimmer Coppejans / (Czech Republic) Zdeněk Kolář 6–4, 6–3.
