= 2019 Braga Open – Doubles =

Doubles
- 2019 Braga Open

Final
- Champions: (Spain) Gerard Granollers (Brazil) Fabrício Neis
- Runners-up: (Belgium) Kimmer Coppejans (Czech Republic) Zdeněk Kolář
- Score: 6–4, 6–3

Events
Singles	Doubles
- Braga Open

Sander Arends and Adil Shamasdin were the defending champions but chose not to defend their title.

Gerard Granollers and Fabrício Neis won the title after defeating Kimmer Coppejans and Zdeněk Kolář 6–4, 6–3 in the final.

== Seeds ==
1. (Spain) Gerard Granollers / (Brazil) Fabrício Neis (champions)
2. (United States) Nathaniel Lammons / (United States) Alex Lawson (quarterfinals)
3. (France) Benjamin Bonzi / (Venezuela) Luis David Martínez (first round)
4. (Spain) David Pérez Sanz / (Netherlands) Sem Verbeek (quarterfinals)

== Draw ==
Key

- Q = Qualifier
- WC = Wild card
- LL = Lucky loser
- Alt = Alternate
- ITF = ITF entry
- PR = Protected ranking
- SR = Special ranking
- SE = Special exempt
- JE = Junior exempt
- JR = Junior Accelerator Programme entrant
- CO = College Accelerator Programme entrant
- NG = Next Gen Accelerator Program entrant
- w/o = Walkover
- r = Retired
- d = Defaulted

First round
1	(Spain) G Granollers (Brazil) F Neis	6	6
(Slovakia) N Gombos (Estonia) J Zopp	4	2
(Argentina) F Bagnis (Argentina) P Cachin	6^{5}	7^{7}	[6]
ITF	(Spain) S Martos Gornés (Spain) O Roca Batalla	7^{7}	6^{4}	[10]
3	(France) B Bonzi (Venezuela) LD Martínez	7	4	[8]
(Uruguay) M Cuevas (Russia) E Karlovskiy	5	6	[10]
ITF	(Brazil) O Luz (Brazil) R Matos	6	6
WC	(Portugal) F Gil (Portugal) B Saraiva	3	1
(Germany) D Köpfer (Egypt) M Safwat	6	6
(United Kingdom) S Clayton (United States) C Harrison	4	4
(United States) B Fratangelo (United States) M Krueger	4	6	[6]
4	(Spain) D Pérez Sanz (Netherlands) S Verbeek	6	3	[10]
WC	(Portugal) F Cabral (Portugal) Gonçalo Falcão	4	3
(Belgium) K Coppejans (Czech Republic) Z Kolář	6	6
Alt	(Spain) T Robredo (Spain) M Vilella Martínez	3	6	[6]
2	(United States) N Lammons (United States) A Lawson	6	3	[10]

Quarterfinals
1	(Spain) G Granollers (Brazil) F Neis	6	6
ITF	(Spain) S Martos Gornés (Spain) O Roca Batalla	3	3
(Uruguay) M Cuevas (Russia) E Karlovskiy	7	4	[10]
ITF	(Brazil) O Luz (Brazil) R Matos	5	6	[5]
(Germany) D Köpfer (Egypt) M Safwat	1	6	[10]
4	(Spain) D Pérez Sanz (Netherlands) S Verbeek	6	4	[7]
(Belgium) K Coppejans (Czech Republic) Z Kolář	7	1	[10]
2	(United States) N Lammons (United States) A Lawson	5	6	[8]

Semifinals
1	(Spain) G Granollers (Brazil) F Neis	3	6	[10]
(Uruguay) M Cuevas (Russia) E Karlovskiy	6	1	[2]
(Germany) D Köpfer (Egypt) M Safwat	1	6^{3}
(Belgium) K Coppejans (Czech Republic) Z Kolář	6	7^{7}

Final
1	(Spain) G Granollers (Brazil) F Neis	6	6
(Belgium) K Coppejans (Czech Republic) Z Kolář	4	3
