= 2022 Braga Open – Doubles =

Doubles
- 2022 Braga Open

Final
- Champions: (Czech Republic) Vít Kopřiva (Czech Republic) Jaroslav Pospíšil
- Runners-up: (India) Jeevan Nedunchezhiyan (Indonesia) Christopher Rungkat
- Score: 3–6, 6–3, [10–4]

Events
Singles	Doubles
- Braga Open

Nuno Borges and Francisco Cabral were the defending champions but chose not to defend their title.

Vít Kopřiva and Jaroslav Pospíšil won the title after defeating Jeevan Nedunchezhiyan and Christopher Rungkat 3–6, 6–3, [10–4] in the final.

== Seeds ==
1. (India) Jeevan Nedunchezhiyan / (Indonesia) Christopher Rungkat (final)
2. (Spain) Íñigo Cervantes / (Spain) Oriol Roca Batalla (first round)
3. (Belgium) Michael Geerts / (Netherlands) Jelle Sels (first round)
4. (Italy) Franco Agamenone / (France) Manuel Guinard (withdrew)

== Draw ==
Key

- Q = Qualifier
- WC = Wild card
- LL = Lucky loser
- Alt = Alternate
- ITF = ITF entry
- PR = Protected ranking
- SR = Special ranking
- SE = Special exempt
- JE = Junior exempt
- JR = Junior Accelerator Programme entrant
- CO = College Accelerator Programme entrant
- NG = Next Gen Accelerator Program entrant
- w/o = Walkover
- r = Retired
- d = Defaulted

First round
(Portugal) J Domingues (Portugal) Gonçalo Falcão	6	6
Alt	(Austria) Peter Goldsteiner (Germany) Sebastian Prechtel	1	0
3	(Belgium) M Geerts (Netherlands) J Sels	3	4
WC	(Portugal) H Rocha (Portugal) Daniel Rodrigues	6	6
Alt	(Germany) Jeremy Jahn (Italy) GM Moroni	6	4	[10]
(Netherlands) M Hermans (Poland) P Matuszewski	2	6	[8]
(Poland) D Michalski; A Shevchenko	6^{2}	6	[6]
(Dominican Republic) N Hardt (Australia) J Taylor	7^{7}	3	[10]
(Czech Republic) V Kopřiva (Czech Republic) J Pospíšil	6	6
Alt	(Portugal) Miguel Gomes (Spain) Imanol López Morillo	2	4
(Australia) A Santillan (Australia) B Walkin	5	4
(Kazakhstan) T Skatov (Spain) C Taberner	7	6
WC	(Portugal) Fábio Coelho (Portugal) J Faria	4	6	[12]
2	(Spain) Í Cervantes (Spain) O Roca Batalla	6	4	[10]

Quarterfinals
1	(India) J Nedunchezhiyan (Indonesia) C Rungkat	6	6
(Portugal) J Domingues (Portugal) G Falcão	3	4
WC	(Portugal) H Rocha (Portugal) D Rodrigues	7^{7}	3	[10]
Alt	(Germany) J Jahn (Italy) GM Moroni	6^{4}	6	[6]
(Dominican Republic) N Hardt (Australia) J Taylor	4	6	[9]
(Czech Republic) V Kopřiva (Czech Republic) J Pospíšil	6	3	[11]
(Kazakhstan) T Skatov (Spain) C Taberner	6	7^{7}
WC	(Portugal) F Coelho (Portugal) J Faria	3	6^{5}

Semifinals
1	(India) J Nedunchezhiyan (Indonesia) C Rungkat	7	6
WC	(Portugal) H Rocha (Portugal) D Rodrigues	5	4
(Czech Republic) V Kopřiva (Czech Republic) J Pospíšil	w/o
(Kazakhstan) T Skatov (Spain) C Taberner

Final
1	(India) J Nedunchezhiyan (Indonesia) C Rungkat	6	3	[4]
(Czech Republic) V Kopřiva (Czech Republic) J Pospíšil	3	6	[10]
