= 2026 Braga Open – Doubles =

Doubles
- 2026 Braga Open

Final
- Champions: (Morocco) Younes Lalami (Spain) Mario Mansilla Díez
- Runners-up: (Poland) Karol Drzewiecki (Croatia) Admir Kalender
- Score: 6–3, 2–6, [16–14]

Events
Singles	Doubles
- Braga Open

Marcelo Demoliner and Orlando Luz were the defending champions but chose not to defend their title.

Younes Lalami and Mario Mansilla Díez won the title after defeating Karol Drzewiecki and Admir Kalender 6–3, 2–6, [16–14] in the final.

== Seeds ==
1. (Colombia) Nicolás Barrientos / (Czech Republic) Matěj Vocel (first round)
2. (Slovakia) Miloš Karol / (Czech Republic) Andrew Paulson (first round)
3. (Spain) Íñigo Cervantes / (Ukraine) Denys Molchanov (semifinals)
4. (Portugal) Tiago Pereira / (Spain) Benjamín Winter López (first round)

== Draw ==
Key

- Q = Qualifier
- WC = Wild card
- LL = Lucky loser
- Alt = Alternate
- ITF = ITF entry
- PR = Protected ranking
- SR = Special ranking
- SE = Special exempt
- JE = Junior exempt
- JR = Junior Accelerator Programme entrant
- CO = College Accelerator Programme entrant
- NG = Next Gen Accelerator Program entrant
- w/o = Walkover
- r = Retired
- d = Defaulted

First round
1	(Colombia) N Barrientos (Czech Republic) M Vocel	4	6^{6}
(Spain) S Martos Gornés (Poland) S Walków	6	7^{8}
(Spain) M Alcalá Gurri (Spain) N Sánchez Izquierdo	6	6
WC	(Portugal) J Domingues (Portugal) T Torres	2	2
4	(Portugal) T Pereira (Spain) B Winter López	7^{7}	4	[6]
(Spain) Ignasi Forcano (Spain) Rafael Izquierdo Luque	6^{2}	6	[10]
(Croatia) M Dodig (Bosnia and Herzegovina) A Nedić	4	3
(Morocco) Y Lalami (Spain) M Mansilla Díez	6	6
WC	(Portugal) T Cação (Portugal) Francisco Rocha	5	2
(United Kingdom) F Bass (United Kingdom) S Duncan	7	6
(Romania) A Jecan (Poland) S Kielan	6^{3}	3
3	(Spain) Í Cervantes (Ukraine) D Molchanov	7^{7}	6
(Netherlands) M Hermans (Netherlands) Ryan Nijboer	5	3
(Spain) A Barroso Campos (Switzerland) J Nikles	7	6
(Poland) K Drzewiecki (Croatia) A Kalender	6	6
2	(Slovakia) M Karol (Czech Republic) A Paulson	2	1

Quarterfinals
(Spain) S Martos Gornés (Poland) S Walków	6^{1}	6	[6]
(Spain) M Alcalá Gurri (Spain) N Sánchez Izquierdo	7^{7}	2	[10]
(Spain) I Forcano (Spain) R Izquierdo Luque	3	4
(Morocco) Y Lalami (Spain) M Mansilla Díez	6	6
(United Kingdom) F Bass (United Kingdom) S Duncan	6	1	[10]
3	(Spain) Í Cervantes (Ukraine) D Molchanov	3	6	[12]
(Spain) A Barroso Campos (Switzerland) J Nikles	1	3
(Poland) K Drzewiecki (Croatia) A Kalender	6	6

Semifinals
(Spain) M Alcalá Gurri (Spain) N Sánchez Izquierdo	3	4
(Morocco) Y Lalami (Spain) M Mansilla Díez	6	6
3	(Spain) Í Cervantes (Ukraine) D Molchanov	2	6	[6]
(Poland) K Drzewiecki (Croatia) A Kalender	6	4	[10]

Final
(Morocco) Y Lalami (Spain) M Mansilla Díez	6	2	[16]
(Poland) K Drzewiecki (Croatia) A Kalender	3	6	[14]
