= 2021 Braga Open =

- Date: 20–26 September
- Edition: 3rd
- Draw: 32S / 16D
- Surface: Clay
- Location: Braga, Portugal

Champions

Singles
- (Brazil) Thiago Monteiro

Doubles
- (Portugal) Nuno Borges / (Portugal) Francisco Cabral
← 2019 ·	Braga Open	· 2022 →

The 2021 Braga Open was a professional tennis tournament played on clay courts. It was the third edition of the tournament which was part of the 2021 ATP Challenger Tour. It took place in Braga, Portugal between 20 and 26 September 2021.

== Singles main-draw entrants ==
=== Seeds ===
Country	Player	Rank^{1}	Seed
BRA	Thiago Monteiro	92	1
JPN	Taro Daniel	112	2
FRA	Hugo Gaston	118	3
SRB	Nikola Milojević	152	4
GER	Cedrik-Marcel Stebe	168	5
ITA	Alessandro Giannessi	174	6
POR	Frederico Ferreira Silva	184	7
CAN	Steven Diez	203	8

- ^{1} Rankings are as of 13 September 2021.

=== Other entrants ===
The following players received wildcards into the singles main draw:

- (Portugal) Pedro Araújo
- (Portugal) Tiago Cação
- (Portugal) Luís Faria

The following players received entry into the singles main draw using protected rankings:

- (Italy) Filippo Baldi
- (Belgium) Joris De Loore

The following players received entry from the qualifying draw:

- (Germany) Peter Heller
- (Argentina) Santiago Rodríguez Taverna
- (Spain) Nikolás Sánchez Izquierdo
- (Japan) Kaichi Uchida

The following player received entry as a lucky loser:

- (United States) Alex Rybakov

== Champions ==
=== Singles ===
- (Brazil) Thiago Monteiro def. (Serbia) Nikola Milojević 7–5, 7–5.

=== Doubles ===
- (Portugal) Nuno Borges / (Portugal) Francisco Cabral def. (Netherlands) Jesper de Jong / (Netherlands) Bart Stevens 6–3, 6–7^{(4–7)}, [10–5].
