= 2018 Braga Open – Doubles =

Doubles
- 2018 Braga Open

Final
- Champions: (Netherlands) Sander Arends (Canada) Adil Shamasdin
- Runners-up: (Uruguay) Ariel Behar (Mexico) Miguel Ángel Reyes-Varela
- Score: 6–2, 6–1

Events
Singles	Doubles
- Braga Open

This was the first edition of the tournament.

Sander Arends and Adil Shamasdin won the title after defeating Ariel Behar and Miguel Ángel Reyes-Varela 6–2, 6–1 in the final.

== Seeds ==
1. (Netherlands) Sander Arends / (Canada) Adil Shamasdin (champions)
2. (Uruguay) Ariel Behar / (Mexico) Miguel Ángel Reyes-Varela (final)
3. (Poland) Tomasz Bednarek / (United States) Hunter Reese (quarterfinals)
4. (United States) Nathaniel Lammons / (Portugal) Gonçalo Oliveira (quarterfinals)

== Draw ==
Key

- Q = Qualifier
- WC = Wild card
- LL = Lucky loser
- Alt = Alternate
- ITF = ITF entry
- PR = Protected ranking
- SR = Special ranking
- SE = Special exempt
- JE = Junior exempt
- JR = Junior Accelerator Programme entrant
- CO = College Accelerator Programme entrant
- NG = Next Gen Accelerator Program entrant
- w/o = Walkover
- r = Retired
- d = Defaulted

First round
1	(Netherlands) S Arends (Canada) A Shamasdin	7^{7}	6
(Germany) T Kamke (Austria) D Novak	6^{4}	4
(Portugal) F Gil (Italy) L Giustino	2	2
(Spain) G Granollers (France) S Robert	6	6
3	(Poland) T Bednarek (United States) H Reese	7^{7}	6
(Argentina) A Collarini (India) S Nagal	6^{4}	2
WC	(Portugal) Gonzalo Ferreira (Portugal) Hugo Maia	1	0
(Spain) P Martínez (Spain) D Vega Hernández	6	6
WC	(Portugal) F Cabral (Portugal) T Cação	3	1
(Portugal) G Elias (Portugal) P Sousa	6	6
(Australia) A de Minaur (Australia) M Reid	6	6^{8}	[10]
(France) A Hoang (France) G Sakharov	4	7^{10}	[3]
(Australia) R Junaid (Netherlands) D Pel	2	5
2	(Uruguay) A Behar (Mexico) MÁ Reyes-Varela	6	7

Quarterfinals
1	(Netherlands) S Arends (Canada) A Shamasdin	6	6
(Spain) G Granollers (France) S Robert	3	2
3	(Poland) T Bednarek (United States) H Reese	7^{7}	4	[9]
(Spain) P Martínez (Spain) D Vega Hernández	6^{1}	6	[11]
(Portugal) G Elias (Portugal) P Sousa	6^{3}	6	[10]
4	(United States) N Lammons (Portugal) G Oliveira	7^{7}	2	[7]
(Australia) A de Minaur (Australia) M Reid	4	1
2	(Uruguay) A Behar (Mexico) MÁ Reyes-Varela	6	6

Semifinals
1	(Netherlands) S Arends (Canada) A Shamasdin	6	6
(Spain) P Martínez (Spain) D Vega Hernández	0	3
(Portugal) G Elias (Portugal) P Sousa	5	7^{7}	[4]
2	(Uruguay) A Behar (Mexico) MÁ Reyes-Varela	7	6^{2}	[10]

Final
1	(Netherlands) S Arends (Canada) A Shamasdin	6	6
2	(Uruguay) A Behar (Mexico) MÁ Reyes-Varela	2	1
