= 2018 Braga Open – Singles =

Singles
- 2018 Braga Open

Final
- Champion: (Portugal) Pedro Sousa
- Runner-up: (Norway) Casper Ruud
- Score: 6–0, 3–6, 6–3

Events
Singles	Doubles
- Braga Open

This was the first edition of the tournament.

Pedro Sousa won the title after defeating Casper Ruud 6–0, 3–6, 6–3 in the final.

== Seeds ==
1. (Portugal) Gastão Elias (semifinals, retired)
2. (Australia) Alex de Minaur (semifinals)
3. (Germany) Yannick Hanfmann (quarterfinals)
4. (Portugal) Pedro Sousa (champion)
5. (France) Stéphane Robert (second round)
6. (Canada) Félix Auger-Aliassime (quarterfinals)
7. (France) Gleb Sakharov (second round)
8. (Norway) Casper Ruud (final)

== Draw ==
Key

- Q = Qualifier
- WC = Wild card
- LL = Lucky loser
- Alt = Alternate
- ITF = ITF entry
- PR = Protected ranking
- SR = Special ranking
- SE = Special exempt
- JE = Junior exempt
- JR = Junior Accelerator Programme entrant
- CO = College Accelerator Programme entrant
- NG = Next Gen Accelerator Program entrant
- w/o = Walkover
- r = Retired
- d = Defaulted

=== Finals ===
Semifinals
1	(Portugal) Gastão Elias	0	0^{r}
4	(Portugal) Pedro Sousa	6	0
8	(Norway) Casper Ruud	6	6
2	(Australia) Alex de Minaur	3	2

Final
4	(Portugal) Pedro Sousa	6	3	6
8	(Norway) Casper Ruud	0	6	3

=== Top half ===
First round
1	(Portugal) G Elias	6	6
Q	(Belgium) G Gigounon	4	4
(France) M Bourgue	6	6
(Argentina) A Collarini	3	3
(Spain) S Gutiérrez Ferrol	6	6
(India) S Nagal	4	0
(Portugal) João Monteiro	6	3	2
7	(France) G Sakharov	2	6	6
4	(Portugal) P Sousa	6	6
(Belgium) Christopher Heyman	2	2
WC	(Portugal) F Cabral	2	2
(Spain) D Muñoz de la Nava	6	6
Q	(Czech Republic) J Šátral	3	2
(Portugal) J Domingues	6	6
(Germany) T Kamke	6^{4}	5
5	(France) S Robert	7^{7}	7

Second round
1	(Portugal) G Elias	4	6	7
(France) M Bourgue	6	3	5
(Spain) S Gutiérrez Ferrol	6	6
7	(France) G Sakharov	3	4
4	(Portugal) P Sousa	7^{7}	6
(Spain) D Muñoz de la Nava	6^{4}	4
(Portugal) J Domingues	7	6
5	(France) S Robert	5	3

Quarterfinals
1	(Portugal) G Elias	6	6
(Spain) S Gutiérrez Ferrol	3	2
4	(Portugal) P Sousa	6	6
(Portugal) J Domingues	1	2

Semifinals
1	(Portugal) G Elias	0	0^{r}
4	(Portugal) P Sousa	6	0

=== Bottom half ===
First round
8	(Norway) C Ruud	6	6
Q	(France) E Furness	4	3
WC	(Portugal) F Ferreira Silva	4	5
(Austria) D Novak	6	7
WC	(Portugal) F Gil	6	1	1
(Spain) P Martínez	3	6	6
(Netherlands) T Griekspoor	3	0
3	(Germany) Y Hanfmann	6	6
6	(Canada) F Auger-Aliassime	6	7
(France) A Hoang	3	5
(Portugal) G Oliveira	7^{7}	4	6
Q	(Spain) D Vega Hernández	6^{2}	6	2
(Italy) L Giustino	4	6	6
(Netherlands) S Griekspoor	6	3	3
WC	(Portugal) T Cação	6	2	3
2	(Australia) A de Minaur	2	6	6

Second round
8	(Norway) C Ruud	6	6
(Austria) D Novak	4	2
(Spain) P Martínez	2	2
3	(Germany) Y Hanfmann	6	6
6	(Canada) F Auger-Aliassime	6	6
(Portugal) G Oliveira	3	1
(Italy) L Giustino	5	7	2
2	(Australia) A de Minaur	7	5	6

Quarterfinals
8	(Norway) C Ruud	6	6
3	(Germany) Y Hanfmann	2	2
6	(Canada) F Auger-Aliassime	6	1	2
2	(Australia) A de Minaur	3	6	6

Semifinals
8	(Norway) C Ruud	6	6
2	(Australia) A de Minaur	3	2
