= 2021 Braga Open – Doubles =

Doubles
- 2021 Braga Open

Final
- Champions: (Portugal) Nuno Borges (Portugal) Francisco Cabral
- Runners-up: (Netherlands) Jesper de Jong (Netherlands) Bart Stevens
- Score: 6–3, 6–7^{(4–7)}, [10–5]

Events
Singles	Doubles
- Braga Open

Gerard Granollers and Fabrício Neis were the defending champions but chose not to defend their title.

Nuno Borges and Francisco Cabral won the title after defeating Jesper de Jong and Bart Stevens 6–3, 6–7^{(4–7)}, [10–5] in the final.

== Seeds ==
1. (France) Sadio Doumbia / (France) Fabien Reboul (quarterfinals, withdrew)
2. (Italy) Marco Bortolotti / (Italy) Andrea Pellegrino (first round)
3. (Netherlands) Jesper de Jong / (Netherlands) Bart Stevens (final)
4. (Portugal) Nuno Borges / (Portugal) Francisco Cabral (champions)

== Draw ==
Key

- Q = Qualifier
- WC = Wild card
- LL = Lucky loser
- Alt = Alternate
- ITF = ITF entry
- PR = Protected ranking
- SR = Special ranking
- SE = Special exempt
- JE = Junior exempt
- JR = Junior Accelerator Programme entrant
- CO = College Accelerator Programme entrant
- NG = Next Gen Accelerator Program entrant
- w/o = Walkover
- r = Retired
- d = Defaulted

First round
1	(France) S Doumbia (France) F Reboul	7^{7}	6
WC	(Portugal) Fábio Coelho (Portugal) Gonçalo Falcão	6^{4}	4
(United States) T-S Kwiatkowski (United States) A Rybakov	6^{3}	2
WC	(Portugal) J Faria (Portugal) Luís Faria	7^{7}	6
4	(Portugal) N Borges (Portugal) F Cabral	4	6	[10]
(Italy) F Baldi (Italy) J Berrettini	6	1	[8]
(Argentina) A Collarini (Netherlands) M Vervoort	6	6
WC	(Portugal) Miguel Gomes (Portugal) H Rocha	2	2
(Dominican Republic) R Cid Subervi (Mexico) L Patiño	3	7	[4]
(Russia) B Bobrov (Spain) R Ortega Olmedo	6	5	[10]
PR	(Japan) T Daniel (Belgium) J De Loore	4	7	[3]
3	(Netherlands) J de Jong (Netherlands) B Stevens	6	5	[10]
Alt	(Netherlands) M Hermans (Netherlands) I Sijsling	6	2	[12]
(Italy) A Arnaboldi (Italy) G Zeppieri	4	6	[10]
PR	(Germany) Peter Heller (Belgium) Jeroen Vanneste	2	6	[10]
2	(Italy) M Bortolotti (Italy) A Pellegrino	6	2	[5]

Quarterfinals
1	(France) S Doumbia (France) F Reboul
WC	(Portugal) J Faria (Portugal) L Faria	w/o
4	(Portugal) N Borges (Portugal) F Cabral	7^{7}	6
(Argentina) A Collarini (Netherlands) M Vervoort	6^{4}	2
(Russia) B Bobrov (Spain) R Ortega Olmedo	3	3
3	(Netherlands) J de Jong (Netherlands) B Stevens	6	6
Alt	(Netherlands) M Hermans (Netherlands) I Sijsling	6	7
PR	(Germany) P Heller (Belgium) J Vanneste	4	5

Semifinals
WC	(Portugal) J Faria (Portugal) L Faria	7^{7}	3	[7]
4	(Portugal) N Borges (Portugal) F Cabral	6^{4}	6	[10]
3	(Netherlands) J de Jong (Netherlands) B Stevens	6	6
Alt	(Netherlands) M Hermans (Netherlands) I Sijsling	1	1

Final
4	(Portugal) N Borges (Portugal) F Cabral	6	6^{4}	[10]
3	(Netherlands) J de Jong (Netherlands) B Stevens	3	7^{7}	[5]
