= 2025 Braga Open =

- Date: 29 September – 5 October
- Edition: 7th
- Draw: 32S / 16D
- Surface: Clay
- Location: Braga, Portugal

Champions

Singles
- (Croatia) Luka Mikrut

Doubles
- (Brazil) Marcelo Demoliner / (Brazil) Orlando Luz
- Braga Open

The 2025 Braga Open was a professional tennis tournament played on clay courts. It was the seventh edition of the tournament which was part of the 2025 ATP Challenger Tour. It took place in Braga, Portugal between 29 September and 5 October 2025.

== Singles main-draw entrants ==
=== Seeds ===
Country	Player	Rank^{1}	Seed
ESP	Carlos Taberner	108	1
ESP	Roberto Carballés Baena	113	2
~~PER~~	~~Ignacio Buse~~	~~116~~	~~3~~
DEN	Elmer Møller	117	4
POR	Jaime Faria	118	5
SRB	Dušan Lajović	125	6
ITA	Andrea Pellegrino	134	7
ARG	Marco Trungelliti	143	8

- ^{1} Rankings are as of 22 September 2025.

=== Other entrants ===
The following players received wildcards into the singles main draw:

- (Portugal) Pedro Araújo
- (Portugal) Tiago Pereira
- (Portugal) Francisco Rocha

The following players received entry from the qualifying draw:

- (Belgium) Buvaysar Gadamauri
- (Denmark) Johannes Ingildsen
- (France) Lilian Marmousez
- (India) Sumit Nagal
- (Germany) Henri Squire
- (Portugal) Tiago Torres

The following players received entry as lucky losers:

- (Spain) Javier Barranco Cosano
- (Netherlands) Max Houkes

== Champions ==
=== Singles ===
- (Croatia) Luka Mikrut def. (Lithuania) Vilius Gaubas 6–3, 6–4.

=== Doubles ===
- (Brazil) Marcelo Demoliner / (Brazil) Orlando Luz def. (Bulgaria) Alexander Donski / (Serbia) Stefan Latinović 7–5, 5–7, [10–7].
