= 2018 Braga Open =

- Date: 7–13 May
- Edition: 1st
- Draw: 32S / 16D
- Surface: Clay
- Location: Braga, Portugal

Champions

Singles
- (Portugal) Pedro Sousa

Doubles
- (Netherlands) Sander Arends / (Canada) Adil Shamasdin
Braga Open	· 2019 →

The 2018 Braga Open was a professional tennis tournament played on clay courts. It was the 1st edition of the tournament which was part of the 2018 ATP Challenger Tour. It took place in Braga, Portugal between 7 and 13 May 2018.

== Singles main-draw entrants ==
=== Seeds ===
Country	Player	Rank^{1}	Seed
POR	Gastão Elias	108	1
AUS	Alex de Minaur	109	2
GER	Yannick Hanfmann	118	3
POR	Pedro Sousa	143	4
FRA	Stéphane Robert	167	5
CAN	Félix Auger-Aliassime	188	6
FRA	Gleb Sakharov	189	7
NOR	Casper Ruud	193	8

- ^{1} Rankings are as of 30 April 2018.

=== Other entrants ===
The following players received wildcards into the singles main draw:

- (Portugal) Francisco Cabral
- (Portugal) Tiago Cação
- (Portugal) Frederico Ferreira Silva
- (Portugal) Fred Gil

The following players received entry from the qualifying draw:

- (France) Evan Furness
- (Belgium) Germain Gigounon
- (Czech Republic) Jan Šátral
- (Spain) David Vega Hernández

== Champions ==
=== Singles ===
- (Portugal) Pedro Sousa def. (Norway) Casper Ruud 6–0, 3–6, 6–3.

=== Doubles ===
- (Netherlands) Sander Arends / (Canada) Adil Shamasdin def. (Uruguay) Ariel Behar / (Mexico) Miguel Ángel Reyes-Varela 6–2, 6–1.
