= 2025 Braga Open – Doubles =

Doubles
- 2025 Braga Open

Final
- Champions: (Brazil) Marcelo Demoliner (Brazil) Orlando Luz
- Runners-up: (Bulgaria) Alexander Donski (Serbia) Stefan Latinović
- Score: 7–5, 5–7, [10–7]

Events
Singles	Doubles
- Braga Open

Théo Arribagé and Francisco Cabral were the defending champions but chose not to defend their title.

Marcelo Demoliner and Orlando Luz won the title after defeating Alexander Donski and Stefan Latinović 7–5, 5–7, [10–7] in the final.

== Seeds ==
1. (Brazil) Marcelo Demoliner / (Brazil) Orlando Luz (champions)
2. (Spain) Íñigo Cervantes / (Ukraine) Denys Molchanov (quarterfinals)
3. (Austria) David Pichler / (Croatia) Nino Serdarušić (quarterfinals)
4. (Denmark) Johannes Ingildsen / (Italy) Filippo Romano (first round)

== Draw ==
Key

- Q = Qualifier
- WC = Wild card
- LL = Lucky loser
- Alt = Alternate
- ITF = ITF entry
- PR = Protected ranking
- SR = Special ranking
- SE = Special exempt
- JE = Junior exempt
- JR = Junior Accelerator Programme entrant
- CO = College Accelerator Programme entrant
- NG = Next Gen Accelerator Program entrant
- w/o = Walkover
- r = Retired
- d = Defaulted

=== Draw ===
First round
1	(Brazil) M Demoliner (Brazil) O Luz	6	6
WC	(Portugal) Pedro Araújo (Portugal) T Torres	2	3
(Portugal) T Pereira (Spain) D Vega Hernández	6	3	[12]
(Italy) Simone Agostini (Italy) S Travaglia	3	6	[10]
3	(Austria) D Pichler (Croatia) N Serdarušić	6	3	[10]
(Croatia) D Ajduković (Croatia) A Kalender	1	6	[6]
(Czech Republic) Z Kolář (Croatia) L Mikrut	6	6
(Spain) Rafael Izquierdo Luque (Portugal) Francisco Rocha	4	1
WC	(Portugal) T Cação (Portugal) Hugo Maia	4	3
(Czech Republic) Jiří Barnat (Czech Republic) F Duda	6	6
(Romania) A Jecan (Romania) B Pavel	6	6
4	(Denmark) J Ingildsen (Italy) F Romano	3	2
(Bulgaria) A Donski (Serbia) S Latinović	7	7
(Romania) C Crețu (France) Lilian Marmousez	5	5
(Spain) M Mansilla Díez (Spain) S Martos Gornés	4	4
2	(Spain) Í Cervantes (Ukraine) D Molchanov	6	6

Quarterfinals
1	(Brazil) M Demoliner (Brazil) O Luz	4	7^{7}	[10]
(Portugal) T Pereira (Spain) D Vega Hernández	6	6^{4}	[8]
3	(Austria) D Pichler (Croatia) N Serdarušić	3	6	[6]
(Czech Republic) Z Kolář (Croatia) L Mikrut	6	2	[10]
(Czech Republic) J Barnat (Czech Republic) F Duda	3	4
(Romania) A Jecan (Romania) B Pavel	6	6
(Bulgaria) A Donski (Serbia) S Latinović	7^{7}	7^{10}
2	(Spain) Í Cervantes (Ukraine) D Molchanov	6^{5}	6^{8}

Semifinals
1	(Brazil) M Demoliner (Brazil) O Luz	6	6
(Czech Republic) Z Kolář (Croatia) L Mikrut	4	3
(Romania) A Jecan (Romania) B Pavel	6^{5}	4
(Bulgaria) A Donski (Serbia) S Latinović	7^{7}	6

Final
1	(Brazil) M Demoliner (Brazil) O Luz	7	5	[10]
(Bulgaria) A Donski (Serbia) S Latinović	5	7	[7]
