= 2022 Braga Open =

- Date: 19–25 September
- Edition: 4th
- Draw: 32S / 16D
- Surface: Clay
- Location: Braga, Portugal

Champions

Singles
- (United States) Nicolas Moreno de Alboran

Doubles
- (Czech Republic) Vít Kopřiva / (Czech Republic) Jaroslav Pospíšil
- Braga Open

The 2022 Braga Open was a professional tennis tournament played on clay courts. It was the fourth edition of the tournament which was part of the 2022 ATP Challenger Tour. It took place in Braga, Portugal between 19 and 25 September 2022.

== Singles main-draw entrants ==
=== Seeds ===
Country	Player	Rank^{1}	Seed
POR	Nuno Borges	93	1
ESP	Carlos Taberner	121	2
ITA	Franco Agamenone	147	3
FRA	Alexandre Müller	148	4
FRA	Manuel Guinard	149	5
CZE	Vít Kopřiva	151	6
	Alexander Shevchenko	166	7
FRA	Benoît Paire	176	8

- ^{1} Rankings are as of 19 September 2022.

=== Other entrants ===
The following players received wildcards into the singles main draw:

- (Portugal) Pedro Araújo
- (Portugal) Gonçalo Oliveira
- (Portugal) Duarte Vale

The following players received entry from the qualifying draw:

- (Spain) Javier Barranco Cosano
- (France) Ugo Blanchet
- (Germany) Jeremy Jahn
- (Spain) Pablo Llamas Ruiz
- (Spain) Imanol López Morillo
- (United States) Nicolas Moreno de Alboran

The following player received entry as a lucky loser:

- (Croatia) Duje Ajduković

== Champions ==
=== Singles ===
- (United States) Nicolas Moreno de Alboran def. (Brazil) Matheus Pucinelli de Almeida 6–2, 6–4.

=== Doubles ===
- (Czech Republic) Vít Kopřiva / (Czech Republic) Jaroslav Pospíšil def. (India) Jeevan Nedunchezhiyan / (Indonesia) Christopher Rungkat 3–6, 6–3, [10–4].
