= Elmer Møller =

Danish tennis player (born 2003)

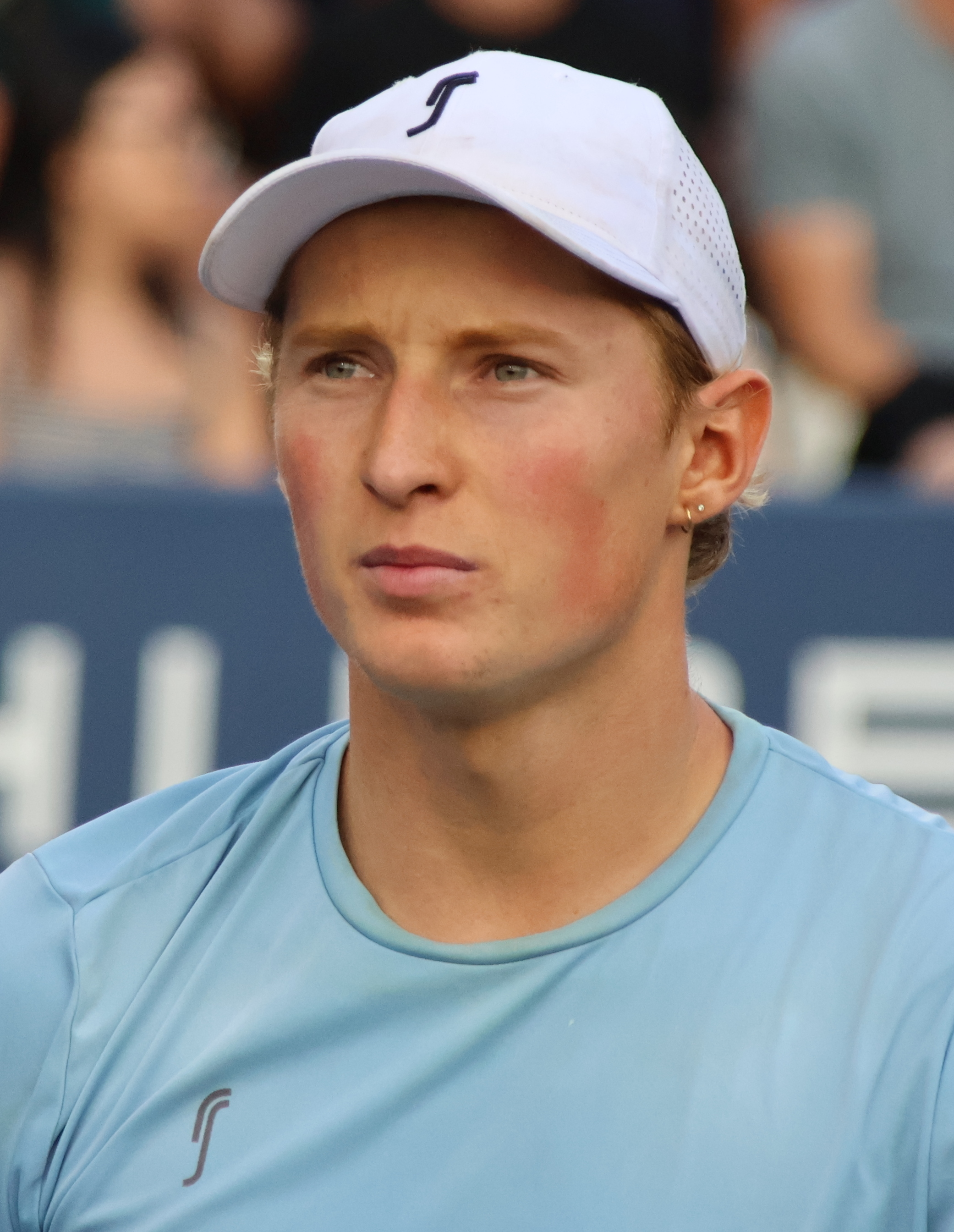
- Møller at the 2026 US Open
- Country (sports): Denmark
- Residence: Aarhus, Denmark
- Born: 9 July 2003 (age 23) Aarhus, Denmark
- Height: 1.83 m (6 ft 0 in)
- Turned pro: 2019
- Plays: Right-handed (two-handed backhand)
- Coach: Santiago Maccio, Jacob Holst, Frederik Nielsen
- Prize money: US $742,152

Singles
- Career record: 11–14 (at ATP Tour level, Grand Slam level, and in Davis Cup)
- Career titles: 0
- Highest ranking: No. 102 (14 July 2025)
- Current ranking: No. 149 (16 November 2026)

Grand Slam singles results
- Australian Open: Q2 (2026)
- French Open: 1R (2025)
- Wimbledon: 1R (2025)
- US Open: 1R (2025)

Doubles
- Career record: 0–1 (at ATP Tour level, Grand Slam level, and in Davis Cup)
- Career titles: 0
- Highest ranking: No. 899 (26 June 2023)
- Last updated on: 15 November 2026.

Elmer Møller (born 9 July 2003) is a Danish professional tennis player. He has a career-high ATP singles ranking of No. 102 achieved on 14 July 2025 and a doubles ranking of No. 899, reached on 26 June 2023. He is currently the No. 2 singles player from Denmark.

Møller represents Denmark at the Davis Cup, where he has a W/L record of 1–2.

== Career ==
=== 2024: Maiden Challenger title ===
In May 2024, Møller reached his maiden Challenger final at the 2024 Schwaben Open, losing to Timofey Skatov. In August, he made his second final at the 2024 Svijany Open in Liberec, Czechia but lost to Hugo Dellien. He reached a new career-high ranking of No. 251 on 5 August 2024. In September, at the 2024 Lisboa Belém Open where he entered the main draw as a lucky loser, he reached the semifinals before losing to Raphaël Collignon. The following week, at the next Challenger, the 2024 Braga Open, after qualifying for the main draw, he went one step further and reached his third final. He won his maiden Challenger title, defeating fifth seed Daniel Elahi Galán in the final. As a result, he reached the top 200 at world No. 169 in the rankings on 14 October 2025.

=== 2025: Major, Masters and top 125 debuts ===
Møller reached world No. 149 on 27 January 2025 after the 2025 Australian Open. In April, he reached the final at the 2025 Girona Challenger but lost to Marin Čilić. Following lifting his biggest title at a Challenger 125, the 2025 Open de Oeiras, defeating top seed Francisco Comesaña in straight sets, Møller reached world No. 114 in the singles rankings on 21 April 2025.

Møller made his Masters 1000 debut at the 2025 Mutua Madrid Open after qualifying for the main draw, where he lost to João Fonseca. Ranked No. 111, Møller made his Grand Slam main draw debut at the 2025 French Open as a lucky loser. Moller also made his debut at the 2025 Wimbledon Championships following the withdrawal of Casper Ruud. He won his second Challenger title of the season at the 2025 Iași Open and reached a new career high of world No. 102 on 14 July 2025.

== ATP Challenger Tour finals ==
=== Singles: 9 (4 titles, 5 runner-ups) ===
| Legend ATP Challenger Tour (4–5) | Finals by surface Hard (–) Clay (4–5) |

| Result | W–L | Date | Tournament | Tier | Surface | Opponent | Score |
|---|---|---|---|---|---|---|---|
| Loss | 0–1 | May 2024 | Schwaben Open, Germany | Challenger | Clay | (Kazakhstan) Timofey Skatov | 6–3, 5–7, 3–6 |
| Loss | 0–2 | Aug 2024 | Svijany Open, Czech Republic | Challenger | Clay | (Bolivia) Hugo Dellien | 7–5, 4–6, 1–6 |
| Win | 1–2 | Sep 2024 | Braga Open, Portugal | Challenger | Clay | (Colombia) Daniel Elahi Galán | 6–4, 7–6^{(7–4)} |
| Loss | 1–3 | Nov 2024 | Lima Challenger II, Peru | Challenger | Clay | (Czech Republic) Vít Kopřiva | 3–6, 6–7^{(3–7)} |
| Loss | 1–4 | Mar 2025 | Girona Challenger, Spain | Challenger | Clay | (Croatia) Marin Čilić | 3–6, 4–6 |
| Win | 2–4 | Apr 2025 | Open de Oeiras, Portugal | Challenger | Clay | (Argentina) Francisco Comesaña | 6–0, 6–4 |
| Win | 3–4 | Jul 2025 | Iași Open, Romania | Challenger | Clay | (France) Titouan Droguet | 3–6, 6–1, 7–6^{(7–2)} |
| Win | 4–4 | Nov 2025 | Maia Open, Portugal | Challenger | Clay (i) | (Slovakia) Andrej Martin | 6–4, 6–1 |
| Loss | 4–5 | Oct 2026 | Braga Open, Portugal | Challenger | Clay | (Croatia) Matej Dodig | 6–3, 3–6, 2–6 |

== ITF World Tennis Tour finals ==
=== Singles: 9 (6 titles, 3 runner-ups) ===
| Legend ITF WTT (6–3) | Finals by surface Hard (2–0) Clay (4–3) |

| Result | W–L | Date | Tournament | Tier | Surface | Opponent | Score |
|---|---|---|---|---|---|---|---|
| Win | 1–0 | Nov 2022 | M15 Heraklion, Greece | WTT | Hard | (Netherlands) Sidané Pontjodikromo | 6–3, 7–5 |
| Win | 2–0 | Jun 2023 | M15 Constanța, Romania | WTT | Clay | (France) Florent Bax | 3–6, 6–0, 6–1 |
| Win | 3–0 | Jun 2023 | M25 Risskov-Aarhus, Denmark | WTT | Clay | (Sweden) Leo Borg | 6–3, 6–3 |
| Loss | 3–1 | Jun 2023 | M15 Alkmaar, Netherlands | WTT | Clay | (Netherlands) Sander Jong | 4–6, 3–6 |
| Loss | 3–2 | Jul 2023 | M15 Vejle, Denmark | WTT | Clay | (Netherlands) Alec Deckers | 4–6, 6–3, 3–6 |
| Loss | 3–3 | Jul 2023 | M15 Eindhoven, Netherlands | WTT | Clay | (Germany) Adrian Oetzbach | 7–6^{(7–5)}, 6–7^{(1–7)}, 6–7^{(4–7)} |
| Win | 4–3 | Nov 2023 | M15 Limassol, Cyprus | WTT | Hard | (Czech Republic) Jakub Nicod | 6–4, 6–3 |
| Win | 5–3 | Apr 2024 | M25 Santa Margherita di Pula, Italy | WTT | Clay | (Italy) Tommaso Compagnucci | 6–2, 6–3 |
| Win | 6–3 | Jun 2024 | M25 Aarhus, Denmark | WTT | Clay | (Denmark) August Holmgren | 6–3, 6–0 |

=== Doubles: 4 (1 title, 3 runner-ups) ===
| Legend ITF WTT (1–3) | Finals by surface Hard (1–2) Clay (0–1) |

| Result | W–L | Date | Tournament | Tier | Surface | Partner | Opponents | Score |
|---|---|---|---|---|---|---|---|---|
| Loss | 0–1 | Jul 2022 | M15 Vejle, Denmark | WTT | Clay | (Denmark) Anders Grinderslev | (Denmark) Carl Emil Overbeck (Denmark) Benjamin Hannestad | 5–7, 7–6^{(11–9)}, [12–14] |
| Win | 1–1 | Feb 2023 | M15 Sharm El Sheikh, Egypt | WTT | Hard | (Denmark) Johannes Ingildsen | (Egypt) Akram El Sallaly (Egypt) Mohamed Safwat | 6–3, 6–2 |
| Loss | 1–2 | Mar 2023 | M15 Heraklion, Greece | WTT | Hard | (Czech Republic) Matthew William Donald | (Italy) Andrea Picchione (Ecuador) Andrés Andrade | 3–6, 3–6 |
| Loss | 1–3 | Nov 2023 | M15 Limassol, Cyprus | WTT | Hard | (Denmark) Johannes Ingildsen | (Netherlands) Jurriaan Bol (Netherlands) Brian Bozemoj | 6–4, 2–6, [9–11] |
