= Valldoreix =

Human settlement in Barcelona, Spain

- Singular population entity
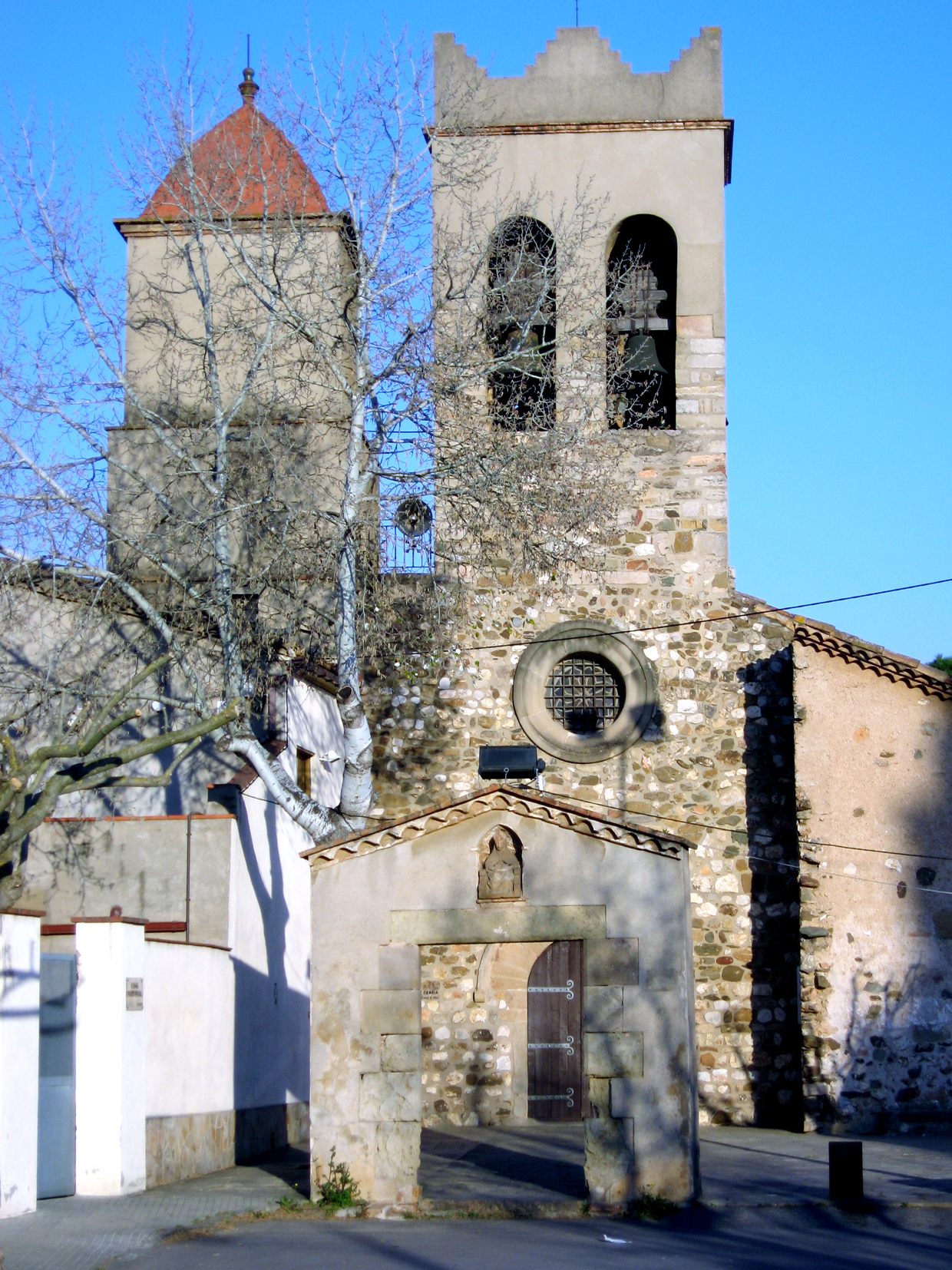
- Church of Valldoreix

- Flag Seal

- Location within Spain Location within Catalonia Location within Province of Barcelona
- Coordinates: 41°27′27.4″N 2°02′52.4″E
- Country: Spain
- A. community: Catalunya
- Province: Barcelona
- Municipality: Sant Cugat del Vallès

Population (January 1, 2025)
  - Total: 8,783
- Time zone: UTC+01:00
- Postal code: 08197
- MCN: 08205000400
- Website: Official website

Valldoreix is a singular population entity in the municipality of Sant Cugat del Vallès, in Catalonia, Spain.

As of 2025 it has a population of 8,783 people.

== Geography ==
On the northern edge it connects with Mira-sol, another community in the Sant Cugat del Vallès municipality.
