= Oriol Roca Batalla =

Spanish tennis player (born 1993)

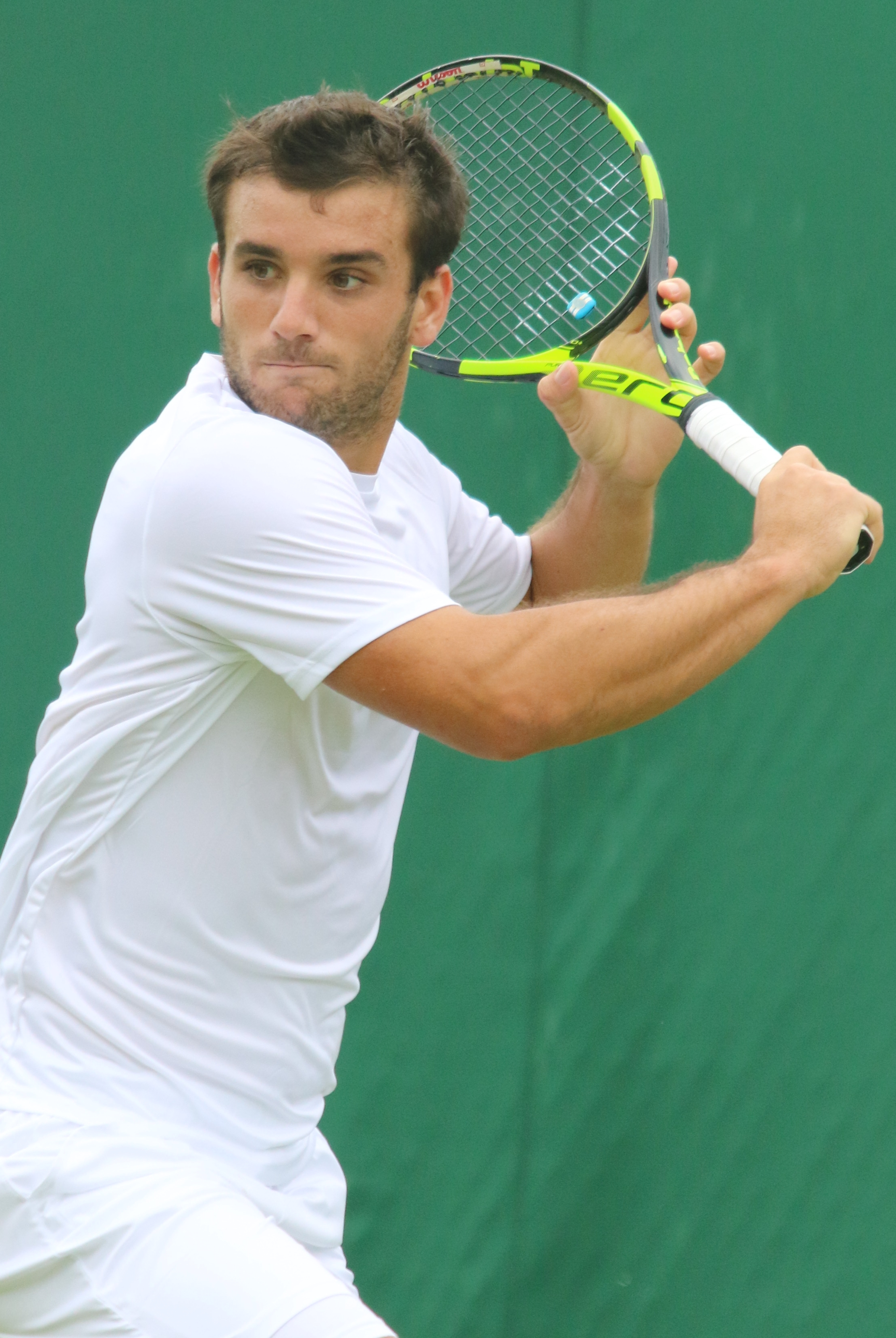
- Country (sports): Spain
- Residence: Barcelona, Spain
- Born: 30 April 1993 (age 33) Barcelona, Spain
- Plays: Right-handed (one handed-backhand)
- Prize money: US$647,743

Singles
- Career record: 1–2
- Career titles: 2 Challengers
- Highest ranking: No. 150 (19 August 2024)
- Current ranking: No. 394 (16 March 2026)

Grand Slam singles results
- Australian Open: Q2 (2016, 2024)
- French Open: Q1 (2024)
- Wimbledon: Q1 (2016, 2024)
- US Open: Q1 (2015, 2024)

Doubles
- Career record: 0–1
- Career titles: 8 Challengers
- Highest ranking: No. 128 (16 October 2023)
- Current ranking: No. 278 (16 March 2026)
- Last updated on: 22 March 2026.

Oriol Roca Batalla (Catalan: [uriˈɔl ˈrɔkə βəˈtaʎə], (Note: In isolation, Batalla is pronounced [bəˈtaʎə].) Spanish: [oˈɾjol ˈroka βaˈtaʎa]; (Note: In isolation, Batalla is pronounced [baˈtaʎa].) born 30 April 1993) is a professional Spanish tennis player who competes on the ATP Challenger Tour. He has a career high ATP singles ranking of World No. 150 achieved on 19 August 2024 and a doubles ranking of No. 128 achieved on 16 October 2023.

Roca Batalla has won 30 ITF singles titles, including two ATP Challengers, and 51 ITF doubles titles.

== Career ==
He made it to his first ATP Challenger Tour singles final in Kenitra, Morocco on 19 September 2015.

Roca Batalla made his ATP main draw debut in doubles at the 2015 Barcelona Open Banc Sabadell, where he received a wildcard partnering Gerard Granollers.

He made his ATP singles debut as a lucky loser at the 2018 Swiss Open Gstaad where he defeated Paolo Lorenzi for his first ATP win before losing to Feliciano López.

He won his first singles Challenger title at the 2023 Braga Open and his second at the 2024 Tunis Open. He reached the top 150 on 19 August 2024.

== Challenger and Futures/World Tennis Tour Finals ==
=== Singles: 51 (33–18) ===
Legend (singles) ATP Challenger Tour (2–2) ITF Futures/World Tennis Tour (31–16)	Titles by surface Hard (2–3) Clay (31–15) Grass (0–0) Carpet (0–0)

Result	W–L	Date	Tournament	Tier	Surface	Opponent	Score
Loss	0–1	Sep 2012	Spain F28, Getafe	Futures	Hard	(Russia) Aleksander Lobkov	3–6, 6–7^{(2–7)}
Win	1–1	Sep 2013	Spain F31, Getafe	Futures	Hard	(Spain) David Vega Hernández	7–5, 6–3
Win	2–1	Feb 2014	Spain F2, Paguera	Futures	Clay	(Australia) Jason Kubler	2–6, 6–3, 6–3
Win	3–1	Apr 2014	Croatia F6, Rovinj	Futures	Clay	(Croatia) Dino Marcan	6–3, 2–6, 6–3
Loss	3-2	Apr 2014	Italy F9, Santa Margherita di Pula	Futures	Clay	(Italy) Stefano Travaglia	6–7^{(4–7)}, 3–6
Win	4-2	Aug 2014	Spain F20, Xàtiva	Futures	Clay	(Australia) Maverick Banes	6–2, 6-2
Win	5-2	Aug 2014	Latvia F1, Jūrmala	Futures	Clay	(Austria) Bastian Trinker	6–4, 6-4
Loss	5-3	Sep 2014	Spain F25, Oviedo	Futures	Clay	(Spain) Jordi Samper Montaña	2-6, 4-6
Win	6-3	Oct 2014	Spain F31, Madrid	Futures	Hard	(Spain) Roberto Ortega Olmedo	7-5, 6-4
Win	7-3	Nov 2014	Morocco F5, Casablanca	Futures	Clay	(Portugal) Leonardo Tavares	6-3, 6-3
Win	8-3	Mar 2015	Turkey F9, Antalya	Futures	Clay	(Brazil) Josè Pereira	7–5, 7–6^{(7–2)}
Loss	8-4	Mar 2015	Turkey F10, Antalya	Futures	Clay	(Brazil) Leonardo Kirche	6–2, 6–7^{(2–7)}, 6–7^{(5–7)}
Win	9-4	Jun 2015	Bulgaria F1, Stara Zagora	Futures	Clay	(Bulgaria) Aleksandar Lazov	3–6, 6–4, 6–2
Win	10-4	Jul 2015	Germany F7, Kassel	Futures	Clay	(Germany) Peter Torebko	4-1 ret.
Win	11-4	Jul 2015	Spain F22, Denia	Futures	Clay	(Spain) Alberto Alcaraz Ivorra	7–5, 7–6^{(7–2)}
Loss	11-5	Sep 2015	Kenitra, Morocco	Challenger	Clay	(Spain) Roberto Carballés Baena	1-6, 1-5 ret.
Loss	11-6	Feb 2016	Spain F5, Cartagena	Futures	Clay	(Chile) Cristian Garín	4–6, 2–6
Win	12-6	May 2016	Tunisia F17, Hammamet	Futures	Clay	(Portugal) Pedro Sousa	6-3, 6-4
Loss	12-7	May 2016	Tunisia F18, Hammamet	Futures	Clay	(Portugal) Pedro Sousa	1-6, 3-6
Loss	12-8	Feb 2017	Spain F6, Cornella de Llobregat	Futures	Hard	(Spain) Roberto Ortega Olmedo	4-6, 3-6
Win	13-8	Mar 2017	Tunisia F9, Hammamet	Futures	Clay	(Portugal) Gonçalo Oliveira	6–1, 6–4
Win	14-8	Mar 2017	Tunisia F10, Hammamet	Futures	Clay	(Italy) Stefano Travaglia	7–6^{(7–3)}, 1–6, 6–0
Win	15-8	Nov 2017	Tunisia F36, Hammamet	Futures	Clay	(Croatia) Nino Serdarušić	6–4, 6–1
Win	16-8	Mar 2018	Tunisia F10, Hammamet	Futures	Clay	(Argentina) Patricio Heras	6–1, 3–6, 7–6^{(9–7)}
Win	17-8	Mar 2018	Tunisia F11, Hammamet	Futures	Clay	(Chile) Juan Carlos Sáez	7–5, 6–1
Win	18-8	May 2018	Spain F11, Valldoreix	Futures	Clay	(Belgium) Omar Salman	7–6^{(7–5)}, 6–2
Loss	18-9	May 2018	Spain F12, Vic	Futures	Clay	(Brazil) Orlando Luz	6–7^{(6–8)}, 2–4 ret.
Loss	18-10	Jun 2018	Tunisia F23, Hammamet	Futures	Clay	(Portugal) Frederico Ferreira Silva	6–7^{(5–7)}, 7–6^{(9–7)}, 5–7
Win	19-10	Jun 2018	Tunisia F24, Hammamet	Futures	Clay	(Argentina) Juan Ignacio Galarza	6-2, 6-2
Win	20-10	Aug 2018	Spain F21, Xàtiva	Futures	Clay	(Spain) Eduard Esteve Lobato	6–2, 7–6^{(7–2)}
Win	21-10	Dec 2018	Turkey F40, Antalya	Futures	Clay	(Russia) Ronald Slobodchikov	6-1, 6-2
Win	21-11	Dec 2018	Turkey F41, Antalya	Futures	Clay	(Russia) Ivan Nedelko	6–1, 6–7^{(3–7)}, 3–6
Win	22-11	Feb 2019	M15 Palma Nova, Spain	World Tennis Tour	Clay	(Argentina) Hernán Casanova	7–6^{(9–7)}, 4–6, 6–1
Win	23-11	Mar 2019	M15 Tabarka, Tunisia	World Tennis Tour	Clay	(Spain) Pol Toledo Bagué	6-4, 7-5
Win	24-11	Sep 2019	M25 Oviedo, Spain	World Tennis Tour	Clay	(Dominican Republic) Jose Hernandez Fernandez	6-4, 6-4
Win	25-11	Sep 2021	M25 Oviedo, Spain	World Tennis Tour	Clay	(Spain) Álvaro López San Martín	7–6^{(7–2)}, 6–1
Win	26-11	Jan 2022	M25 Cairo, Egypt	World Tennis Tour	Clay	(Austria) Lukas Krainer	6-2, 7-5
Loss	26-12	Mar 2022	M25 Poreč, Croatia	World Tennis Tour	Clay	(Austria) Filip Misolic	6–3, 6–7^{(2–7)}, 4–6
Loss	26-13	May 2022	M15 Valldoreix, Spain	World Tennis Tour	Clay	(Spain) Daniel Mérida	6–2, 5–7, 2–6
Win	27-13	Oct 2022	M25 Girona, Spain	World Tennis Tour	Clay	(Canada) Steven Diez	6-3, 6-3
Loss	27-14	Mar 2023	M25 Torelló, Spain	World Tennis Tour	Hard	(Spain) John Echeverria	7–5, 1–6, 6–7^{(5–7)}
Loss	27–15	Aug 2023	Augsburg, Germany	Challenger	Clay	(Spain) Carlos Taberner	4–6, 4–6
Win	28–15	Sep 2023	Braga, Portugal	Challenger	Clay	(Croatia) Duje Ajduković	4–6, 6–1, 6–1
Loss	28-16	Oct 2023	M25 Santa Margherita di Pula, Italy	World Tennis Tour	Clay	(United Kingdom) Felix Gill	2–6, 4–6
Win	29-16	Oct 2023	M25 Santa Margherita di Pula, Italy	World Tennis Tour	Clay	(Poland) Daniel Michalski	2–6, 6–1, 6–4
Win	30–16	May 2024	Tunis, Tunisia	Challenger	Clay	(France) Valentin Royer	7–6^{(7–5)}, 7–5
Win	31-16	Dec 2025	M15 Lima, Peru	World Tennis Tour	Clay	(France) Pierre Delage	6–4, 6–4
Win	32-16	Dec 2025	M15 Lima, Peru	World Tennis Tour	Clay	(Brazil) Enzo Kohlmann de Freitas	7–5, 7–5
Loss	32-17	Apr 2026	M25 Angers, France	World Tennis Tour	Clay	(Spain) Iñaki Montes de la Torre	2–6, 4–6
Loss	32-18	May 2026	M25 Sabadell, Spain	World Tennis Tour	Clay	(Bulgaria) Iliyan Radulov	6–7^{(4–7)}, 2–6
Win	33-18	May 2026	M25 Mataro, Spain	World Tennis Tour	Clay	(Spain) Alex Martí Pujolras	6–4, 6–3
