= Javier Barranco Cosano =

Spanish tennis player (born 1998)

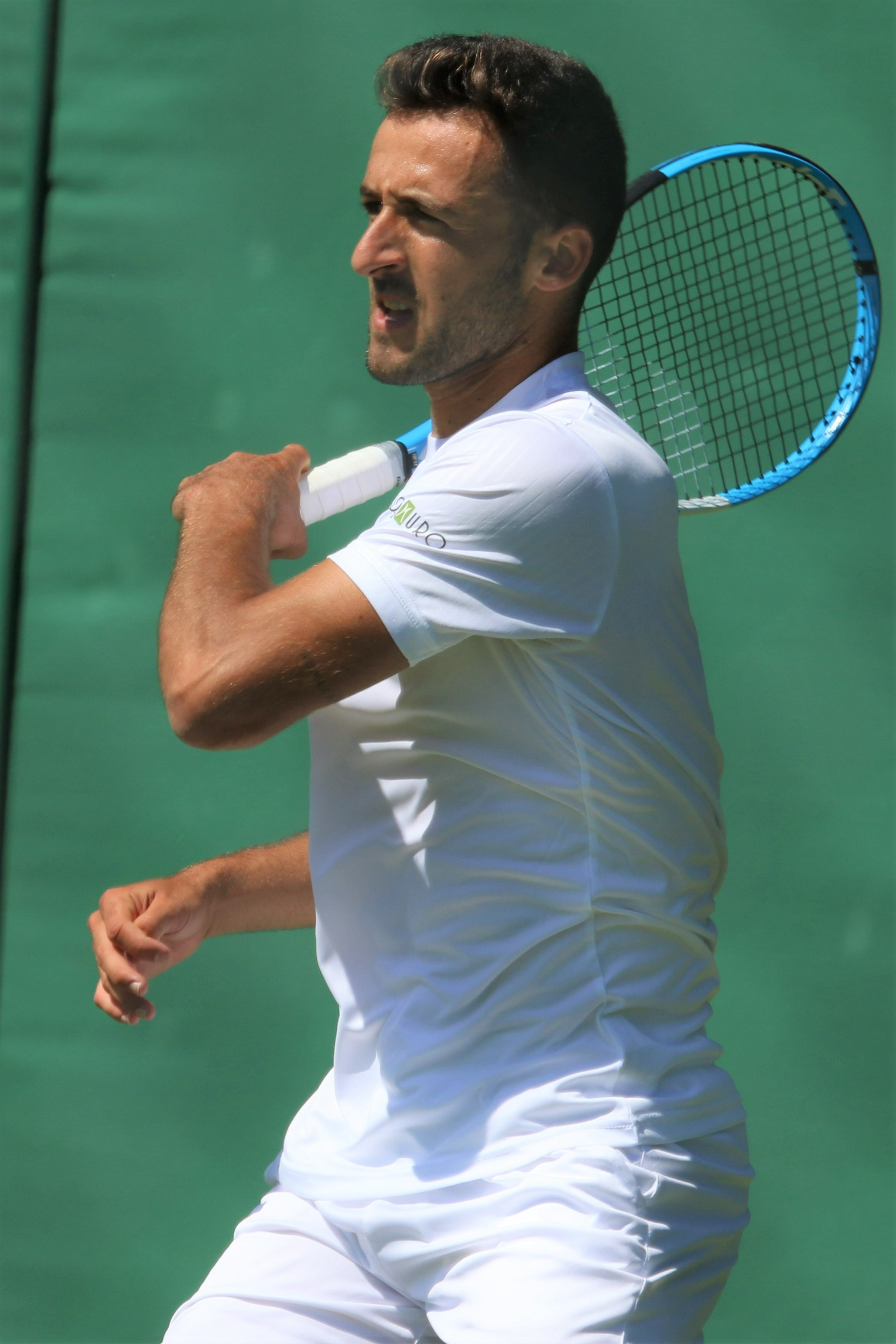
- Country (sports): Spain
- Residence: Sevilla, Spain
- Born: 17 November 1998 (age 27) Almería, Spain
- Height: 1.78 m (5 ft 10 in)
- Plays: Left-handed (two handed-backhand)
- Coach: Juan Pablo Cañas
- Prize money: $413,829

Singles
- Career record: 0–1 (at ATP Tour level, Grand Slam level, and in Davis Cup)
- Career titles: 14 ITF
- Highest ranking: No. 211 (28 October 2024)
- Current ranking: No. 433 (13 July 2026)

Grand Slam singles results
- Australian Open: Q2 (2025)
- Wimbledon: Q2 (2022)
- US Open: Q1 (2024)

Doubles
- Career record: 0–0 (at ATP Tour level, Grand Slam level, and in Davis Cup)
- Career titles: 1 Challenger
- Highest ranking: No. 258 (12 November 2018)
- Current ranking: No. 904 (13 July 2026)
- Last updated on: 15 July 2026.

Javier Barranco Cosano (born 17 November 1998) is a Spanish tennis player who competes on the ATP Challenger Tour. He has a career-high ATP singles ranking of world No. 211 achieved on 28 October 2024 and a doubles ranking of No. 258 achieved on 12 November 2018.

== Career ==
=== 2024: ATP debut ===
He made his ATP main draw debut at the 2024 Lyon Open after entering the singles main draw as a lucky loser, losing to Dominik Koepfer in the first round.

== ATP Challenger and ITF Tour finals ==
=== Singles: 27 (17–10) ===
Legend (singles) ATP Challenger Tour (0–1) ITF Futures Tour/World Tennis Tour (17–9)	Titles by surface Hard (0–0) Clay (17–10) Grass (0–0) Carpet (0–0)

Result	W–L	Date	Tournament	Tier	Surface	Opponent	Score
Win	1–0	Jul 2017	Spain F22 Denia	Futures	Clay	(Spain) Juan Lizariturry	6–1, 6–4
Loss	1–1	Jan 2018	Spain F3 Mallorca	Futures	Clay	(Spain) Daniel Gimeno Traver	6–3, 2–6, 1–6
Loss	1–2	Mar 2018	Croatia F1 Rovinj	Futures	Clay	(Croatia) Nino Serdarušić	7–6^{(7–4)}, 2–6, 4–6
Win	2–2	July 2018	Spain F20 Denia	Futures	Clay	(Spain) Jaume Pla Malfeito	3–6, 6–3, 7–5
Win	3–2	Aug 2018	Spain F24 Santander	Futures	Clay	(Russia) Ivan Gakhov	6–3, 4–6, 6–4
Win	4–2	Aug 2018	Spain F25 Donostia San Sebastián	Futures	Clay	(Italy) Raúl Brancaccio	6–1, 6–1
Win	5–2	Oct 2018	Turkey F34 Antalya	Futures	Clay	(Hungary) Péter Nagy	6–4, 6–1
Loss	5–3	Mar 2019	M15 Murcia, Spain	World Tennis Tour	Clay	(Spain) Álvaro López San Martín	5–6, 1–6
Loss	5–4	Apr 2019	M15 Tabarka, Tunisia	World Tennis Tour	Clay	(France) Maxime Hamou	6–7^{(5–7)}, 4–6
Loss	5–5	Jun 2019	M15 Kamen, Germany	World Tennis Tour	Clay	(Germany) Peter Heller	5–7, 6–3, 3–6
Win	6–5	Aug 2019	M25 Donostia San Sebastián, Spain	World Tennis Tour	Clay	(Brazil) Oscar Jose Gutierrez	7–4, 6–0
Win	7–5	Jan 2020	M15 Antalya, Turkey	World Tennis Tour	Clay	(Italy) Marco Bortolotti	6–4, 6–1
Win	8–5	Jan 2020	M15 Antalya, Turkey	World Tennis Tour	Clay	(Belgium) Julien Cagnina	6–4, 2–6, 6–1
Loss	8–6	Nov 2020	M15 Valldoreix, Spain	World Tennis Tour	Clay	(Denmark) Holger Rune	6–7^{(0–7)}, 3–6
Win	9–6	Jun 2021	M25 The Hague, Netherlands	World Tennis Tour	Clay	(Netherlands) Jelle Sels	2–6, 6–1, 6–1
Win	10–6	Jul 2021	M25 Gandia, Spain	World Tennis Tour	Clay	(France) Antoine Escoffier	6–4, 6–2
Win	11–6	Mar 2022	M25 Rovinj, Croatia	World Tennis Tour	Clay	(Czech Republic) Dalibor Svrčina	6–1, 6–1
Loss	11–7	Jul 2022	M25 Gandia, Spain	World Tennis Tour	Clay	(Spain) Carlos Lopez Montagud	7–6^{(7–2)}, 4–6, 5–7
Win	12–7	Sep 2022	M25 Oviedo, Spain	World Tennis Tour	Clay	(Spain) Carlos Sánchez Jover	7–5, 7–5
Loss	12–8	Oct 2022	M25 Zaragoza, Spain	World Tennis Tour	Clay	Ivan Gakhov	4–6, 6–1, 2–6
Win	13–8	Jun 2023	M25 Córdoba, Spain	World Tennis Tour	Clay	(Spain) Daniel Mérida	6–4, 6–1
Win	14–8	Jul 2023	M25 Getxo, Spain	World Tennis Tour	Clay	(Spain) Iñaki Montes de la Torre	7–6^{(7–2)}, 6–4
Loss	14–9	Nov 2023	M25 Benicarlo, Spain	World Tennis Tour	Clay	(Spain) Miguel Damas	3–6, 6–7^{(5–7)}
Win	15–9	Jan 2024	M25 Antalya, Turkey	World Tennis Tour	Clay	(Argentina) Bautista Vilicich	6–2, 6–3
Loss	15–10	Jul 2024	Iași, Romania	Challenger	Clay	(Bolivia) Hugo Dellien	1–6, 1–6
Win	16–10	Jul 2025	M25 Denia, Spain	World Tennis Tour	Clay	(Spain) Pablo Martinez Gomez	6–0, 5–7, 6–3
Win	17–10	Aug 2025	M25 Santander, Spain	World Tennis Tour	Clay	(Italy) Lorenzo Giustino	6–3, 4–0 ret.
