= João Domingues =

Portuguese tennis player (born 1993)

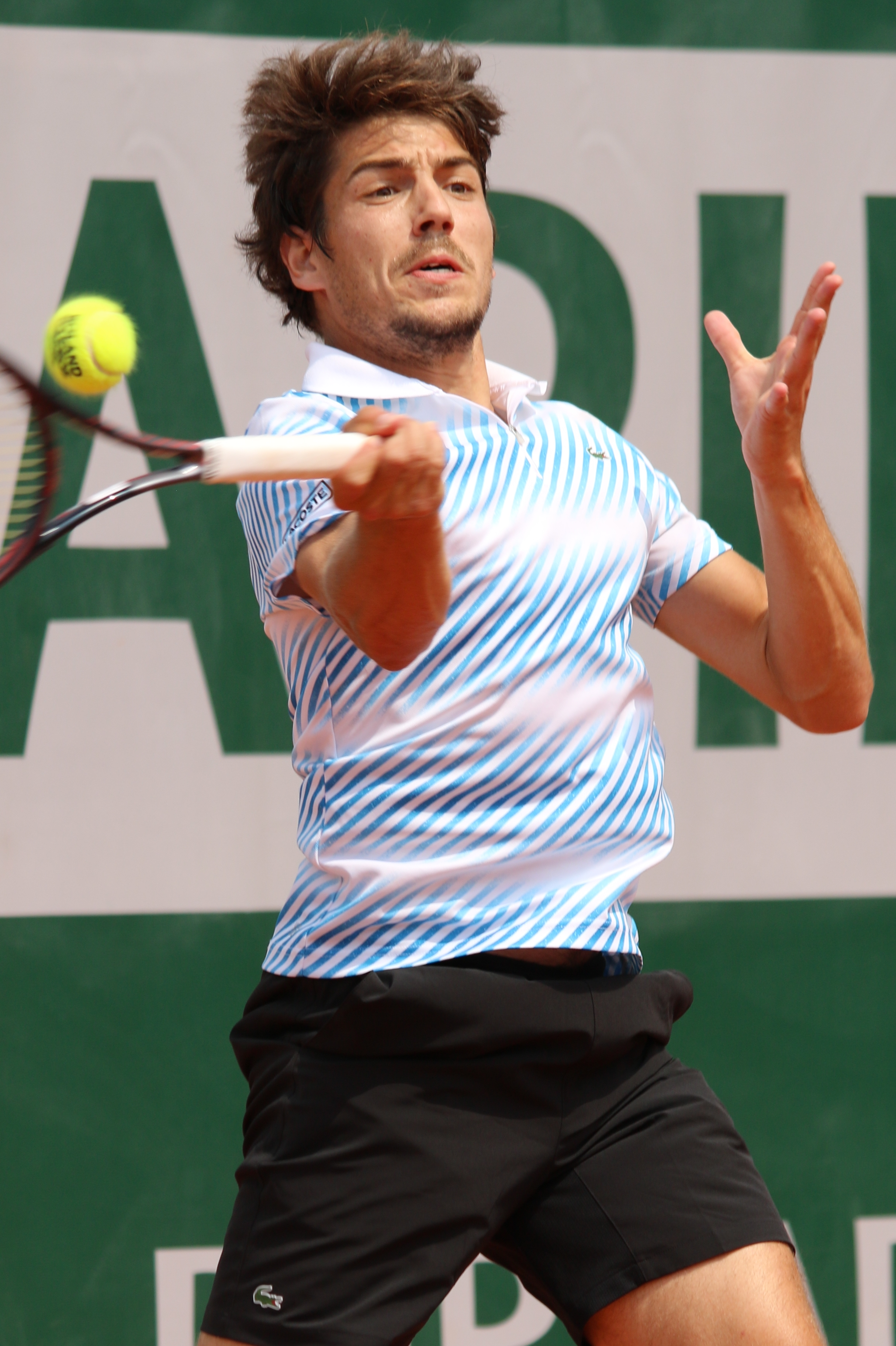
- Domingues in the qualifying rounds of Roland Garros 2019
- Full name: João Domingues
- Country (sports): Portugal
- Residence: Porto, Portugal
- Born: 5 October 1993 (age 32) Oliveira de Azeméis, Portugal
- Height: 1.78 m (5 ft 10 in)
- Turned pro: 2013
- Plays: Right-handed (two-handed backhand)
- Coach: João Antunes; André Podalka
- Prize money: US $561,313

Singles
- Career record: 9–7
- Career titles: 0
- Highest ranking: No. 150 (24 February 2020)
- Current ranking: No. 695 (15 June 2026)

Grand Slam singles results
- Australian Open: Q3 (2019)
- French Open: Q2 (2019)
- Wimbledon: Q1 (2017, 2019, 2021)
- US Open: Q2 (2019)

Doubles
- Career record: 0–2
- Career titles: 0
- Highest ranking: No. 283 (15 July 2019)
- Current ranking: No. 1,289 (15 June 2026)
- Last updated on: 18 June 2026.

João Domingues (born 5 October 1993) is a Portuguese tennis player who currently competes mostly on the ATP Challenger Tour. In 2015, Domingues made his debut for Portugal Davis Cup team. In February 2020, he achieved a career-high singles world ranking No. 150.

== Challenger and Futures finals ==
=== Singles: 25 (11–14) ===
Legend (singles) ATP Challenger Tour (3–1) ITF Futures Tour (8–13)	Titles by surface Hard (3–8) Clay (8–6) Grass (0–0) Carpet (0–0)

Result	W–L	Date	Tournament	Tier	Surface	Opponent	Score
Win	1–0	May 2013	Portugal F7, Coimbra	Futures	Hard	(United Kingdom) Neil Pauffley	7–6^{(7–4)}, 6–3
Loss	1–1	May 2014	Portugal F5, Pombal	Futures	Hard	(Portugal) Frederico Ferreira Silva	0–6, 3–6
Loss	1–2	May 2015	Portugal F7, Idanha-a-Nova	Futures	Hard	(Portugal) Frederico Ferreira Silva	4–6, 2–6
Loss	1–3	Jun 2015	Portugal F8, Idanha-a-Nova	Futures	Hard	(France) Sébastien Boltz	2–6, 0–6
Loss	1–4	Oct 2015	Portugal F13, Porto	Futures	Clay	(Belgium) Arthur De Greef	4–6, 0–6
Loss	1–5	May 2016	Portugal F4, Caldas da Rainha	Futures	Clay	(Brazil) Bruno Sant'Anna	6–7^{(3–7)}, 2–6
Win	2–5	May 2016	Portugal F6, Setúbal	Futures	Hard	(Italy) Erik Crepaldi	6–3, 6–2
Loss	2–6	May 2016	Portugal F7, Lisbon	Futures	Hard	(Portugal) Fred Gil	3–6, 6–7^{(6–8)}
Win	3–6	Jun 2016	Spain F16, Huelva	Futures	Clay	(Spain) Mario Vilella Martínez	6–4, 6–3
Loss	3–7	Oct 2016	Tunisia F29, Hammamet	Futures	Clay	(Germany) Jeremy Jahn	4–6, 6–7^{(8–10)}
Loss	3–8	Nov 2016	Tunisia F30, Hammamet	Futures	Clay	(Belgium) Julien Cagnina	6–3, 3–6, 5–7
Win	4–8	Nov 2016	Tunisia F31, Hammamet	Futures	Clay	(Spain) Pol Toledo Bagué	6–3, 6–1
Win	5–8	Jan 2017	Tunisia F2, Hammamet	Futures	Clay	(Portugal) Gonçalo Oliveira	2–6, 6–4, 6–3
Win	6–8	Jan 2017	Tunisia F3, Hammamet	Futures	Clay	(Italy) Marco Bortolotti	6–4, 3–6, 6–1
Loss	6–9	Mar 2017	Portugal F3, Loulé	Futures	Hard	(Spain) Roberto Ortega Olmedo	2–6, 4–6
Loss	6–10	Apr 2017	Portugal F4, Lisbon	Futures	Hard	(Poland) Hubert Hurkacz	5–7, 1–6
Loss	6–11	Apr 2017	Portugal F6, Porto	Futures	Clay	(Brazil) Daniel Dutra da Silva	2–6, 6–3, 4–6
Win	7–11	Apr 2017	Portugal F7, Carcavelos	Futures	Clay	(France) Maxime Chazal	6–3, 6–1
Win	8–11	May 2017	Mestre, Italy	Challenger	Clay	(Austria) Sebastian Ofner	7–6^{(7–4)}, 6–4
Loss	8–12	Apr 2019	Tunis, Tunisia	Challenger	Clay	(Uruguay) Pablo Cuevas	5–7, 4–6
Win	9–12	May 2019	Braga, Portugal	Challenger	Clay	(Argentina) Facundo Bagnis	6–7^{(5–7)}, 6–2, 6–3
Win	10–12	May 2022	Salvador, Brazil	Challenger	Clay	(Chile) Tomás Barrios Vera	7–6^{(11–9)}, 6–1
Win	11–12	Jul 2024	M25 Porto, Portugal	WTT	Hard	(Portugal) Francisco Rocha	6–4, 2–6, 6–4
Loss	11–13	Mar 2026	M25 Faro, Portugal	WTT	Hard	(Canada) Justin Boulais	5–7, 4–6
Loss	11–14	May 2026	M25 Loule, Portugal	WTT	Hard	(Portugal) Tiago Pereira	4–6, 4–6

=== Doubles: 31 (16–15) ===
Legend (doubles) ATP Challenger Tour (0–1) ITF Futures Tour (16–14)	Titles by surface Hard (14–5) Clay (2–9) Grass (0–0) Carpet (0–1)

Result	W–L	Date	Tournament	Tier	Surface	Partner	Opponents	Score
Win	1–0	Sep 2012	Portugal F5, Porto	Futures	Clay	(Portugal) Gonçalo Loureiro	(Germany) Steven Moneke (Germany) Marc Sieber	3–6, 6–1, [10–8]
Loss	1–1	Jan 2013	USA F1, Plantation	Futures	Clay	(Burundi) Hassan Ndayishimiye	(Croatia) Franko Škugor (Portugal) Pedro Sousa	2–6, 3–6
Loss	1–2	Mar 2013	Spain F8, Villajoyosa	Futures	Carpet	(Spain) José Antón Salazar Martín	(Spain) Oriol Roca Batalla (Spain) Andoni Vivanco-Guzmán	0–6, 3–6
Loss	1–3	May 2013	Portugal F5, Castelo Branco	Futures	Hard	(Portugal) André Gaspar Murta	(Spain) Roberto Ortega Olmedo (Spain) Ricardo Villacorta-Alonso	1–6, 4–6
Win	2–3	Jul 2013	Spain F20, Bakio	Futures	Hard	(Portugal) André Gaspar Murta	(Spain) Iván Arenas-Gualda (Spain) Juan Lizariturry	6–2, 6–2
Win	3–3	Jul 2013	Spain F22, Gandia	Futures	Clay	(Portugal) André Gaspar Murta	(Venezuela) Luis Fernando Ramírez (Venezuela) David Souto	6–4, 6–4
Loss	3–4	Oct 2013	Portugal F9, Porto	Futures	Clay	(Spain) Iván Arenas-Gualda	(Spain) Ricardo Ojeda Lara (Venezuela) Ricardo Rodríguez	6–4, 3–6, [8–10]
Win	4–4	Oct 2013	Portugal F10, Guimarães	Futures	Hard	(Portugal) Frederico Ferreira Silva	(Portugal) Gonçalo Falcão (Portugal) Gonçalo Pereira	7–6^{(7–5)}, 1–6, [10–8]
Win	5–4	Jul 2014	Spain F16, Bakio	Futures	Hard	(Spain) Adam Sanjurjo Hermida	(Spain) Jorge Hernando Ruano (Spain) Ricardo Villacorta-Alonso	6–3, 3–6, [10–8]
Loss	5–5	Jul 2014	Spain F17, Getxo	Futures	Clay	(Spain) José Antón Salazar Martín	(Spain) David Pérez Sanz (India) Ramkumar Ramanathan	7–5, 3–6, [4–10]
Win	6–5	Oct 2014	Portugal F11, Ponta Delgada	Futures	Hard	(Portugal) André Gaspar Murta	(France) Melik Feler (United Kingdom) Aswin Lizen	6–1, 4–6, [10–8]
Win	7–5	Nov 2014	Tunisia F8, Sousse	Futures	Hard	(Portugal) André Gaspar Murta	(Spain) Samuel Ribeiro Navarrete (Spain) Pablo Vivero Gonzalez	7–5, 6–3
Loss	7–6	Mar 2015	Portugal F3, Loulé	Futures	Hard	(Spain) David Vega Hernández	(Portugal) Romain Barbosa (Portugal) Leonardo Tavares	1–6, 6–4, [10–12]
Loss	7–7	May 2015	Portugal F4, Caldas da Rainha	Futures	Clay	(Spain) David Vega Hernández	(Portugal) Fred Gil (Portugal) Frederico Ferreira Silva	3–6, 2–6
Win	8–7	May 2015	Portugal F6, Pombal	Futures	Hard	(Portugal) Nuno Deus	(Portugal) Gonçalo Falcão (Brazil) Bruno Sant'Anna	6–2, 6–4
Win	9–7	May 2015	Portugal F7, Idanha-a-Nova	Futures	Hard	(Portugal) Nuno Deus	(Spain) Carlos Boluda-Purkiss (Spain) Roberto Ortega Olmedo	7–5, 5–7, [10–7]
Win	10–7	Jun 2015	Portugal F8, Idanha-a-Nova	Futures	Hard	(Portugal) Nuno Deus	(Portugal) Romain Barbosa (Belgium) Alexandre Folie	3–6, 6–0, [10–3]
Win	11–7	Oct 2015	Portugal F12, Oliveira de Azeméis	Futures	Hard	(Portugal) Nuno Deus	(Spain) Carlos Gómez-Herrera (United Kingdom) Matthew Short	6–3, 6–4
Loss	11–8	Oct 2015	Portugal F13, Porto	Futures	Clay	(Portugal) Nuno Deus	(Spain) Iván Arenas-Gualda (Spain) David Vega Hernández	3–6, 0–6
Win	12–8	Nov 2015	Tunisia F30, El Kantaoui	Futures	Hard	(Portugal) Felipe Cunha Silva	(Spain) Samuel Ribeiro Navarrete (Spain) Bernabé Zapata Miralles	7–6^{(7–4)}, 6–1
Loss	12–9	Dec 2015	Turkey F48, Antalya	Futures	Clay	(Portugal) Diogo Lourenço	(Netherlands) Romano Frantzen (Netherlands) Alban Meuffels	5–7, 6–2, [6–10]
Loss	12–10	Feb 2016	Tunisia F4, Hammamet	Futures	Clay	(Portugal) Diogo Lourenço	(Portugal) Gonçalo Falcão (Portugal) Fred Gil	4–6, 3–6
Loss	12–11	Mar 2016	Portugal F3, Loulé	Futures	Hard	(Portugal) Nuno Deus	(Germany) Andreas Mies (Germany) Oscar Otte	0–5 ret.
Win	13–11	May 2016	Portugal F5, Lisbon	Futures	Hard	(Portugal) Nuno Deus	(United Kingdom) Scott Clayton (United Kingdom) Jonny O'Mara	4–6, 7–5, [10–7]
Win	14–11	May 2016	Portugal F7, Lisbon	Futures	Hard	(Portugal) Nuno Deus	(United States) Cătălin Gârd (Portugal) Fred Gil	6–4, 6–7^{(3–7)}, [10–6]
Loss	14–12	Jun 2016	Italy F16, Basilicanova	Futures	Clay	(Brazil) Eduardo Dischinger	(Uruguay) Marcel Felder (Argentina) Patricio Heras	4–6, 3–6
Win	15–12	Oct 2016	Portugal F11, Oliveira de Azeméis	Futures	Hard	(Portugal) Nuno Deus	(Italy) Lorenzo Frigerio (Greece) Stefanos Tsitsipas	7–6^{(9–7)}, 6–1
Loss	15–13	Jul 2019	Ludwigshafen, Germany	Challenger	Clay	(Portugal) Pedro Sousa	(United States) Nathaniel Lammons (Brazil) Fernando Romboli	6–7^{(4–7)}, 1–6
Loss	15–14	Oct 2023	M25 Tavira, Portugal	World Tennis Tour	Hard	(Portugal) Goncalo Falcao	(Sweden) Simon Freund (Denmark) Johannes Ingildsen	4–6, 6–4, [5–10]
Win	16–14	Feb 2024	M25 Vila Real de Santo António, Portugal	World Tennis Tour	Hard	(Portugal) Jaime Faria	(Australia) Thomas Fancutt (United States) Hunter Reese	7–6^{(7–2)}, 7–6^{(7–2)}
Loss	16–15	Jun 2024	M25 Elvas, Portugal	World Tennis Tour	Hard	(Portugal) Pedro Araujo	(Portugal) Joao Graca (Portugal) Illia Stollar	4–6, 4–6

== Performance timelines ==
Key
W	F	SF	QF	#R	RR	Q#	P#	DNQ	A	Z#	PO	G	S	B	NMS	NTI	P	NH

(W) winner; (F) finalist; (SF) semifinalist; (QF) quarterfinalist; (#R) rounds 4, 3, 2, 1; (RR) round-robin stage; (Q#) qualification round; (P#) preliminary round; (DNQ) did not qualify; (A) absent; (Z#) Davis/Fed Cup Zonal Group (with number indication) or (PO) play-off; (G) gold, (S) silver or (B) bronze Olympic/Paralympic medal; (NMS) not a Masters tournament; (NTI) not a Tier I tournament; (P) postponed; (NH) not held; (SR) strike rate (events won / competed); (W–L) win–loss record.
To avoid confusion and double counting, these charts are updated at the conclusion of a tournament or when the player's participation has ended.

=== Singles ===
Current through the 2022 Australian Open.

Tournament	2013	2014	2015	2016	2017	2018	2019	2020	2021	2022	SR	W–L	Win%
Grand Slam tournaments
Australian Open	A	A	A	A	A	Q1	Q3	Q2	Q1	Q1	0 / 0	0–0	–
French Open	A	A	A	A	A	Q1	Q2	Q1	Q1		0 / 0	0–0	–
Wimbledon	A	A	A	A	Q1	A	Q1	NH	Q1		0 / 0	0–0	–
US Open	A	A	A	A	Q1	A	Q2	A	Q1		0 / 0	0–0	–
Win–loss	0–0	0–0	0–0	0–0	0–0	0–0	0–0	0–0	0–0	0–0	0 / 0	0–0	–
National representation
Summer Olympics	Not Held			A	Not Held				A		0 / 0	0–0	–
Davis Cup	A	A	Z2	Z1	PO	Z1	Z1	A	A		0 / 4	4–0	100%
Career statistics
	2013	2014	2015	2016	2017	2018	2019	2020	2021	2022	Career		
Tournaments	0	0	0	0	1	2	1	2	0	0	6		
Titles	0	0	0	0	0	0	0	0	0	0	0		
Finals	0	0	0	0	0	0	0	0	0	0	0		
Hard win–loss	0–0	0–0	1–0	0–0	0–0	0–0	0–1	0–0	0–0	0–0	0 / 0	1–1	100%
Clay win–loss	0–0	0–0	0–0	1–0	2–1	2–2	2–1	1–2	0–0	0–0	0 / 6	8–6	64%
Grass win–loss	0–0	0–0	0–0	0–0	0–0	0–0	0–0	0–0	0–0	0–0	0 / 0	0–0	–
Overall win–loss	0–0	0–0	1–0	1–0	2–1	2–2	2–2	1–2	0–0	0–0	0 / 6	9–7	67%
Win (%)	–	–	100%	100%	67%	50%	50%	33%	–		56.25%		
Year-end ranking	551	565	498	342	169	224	173	176	248		$245,275		

== Career earnings ==
Year	Major titles	ATP titles	Total titles	Earnings	Ref
2009	0	0	0	$176	
2010	0	0	0	$371	
2011	0	0	0	$1,346	
2012	0	0	0	$4,341	
2013	0	0	0	$9,268	
2014	0	0	0	$9,492	
2015	0	0	0	$13,139	
2016	0	0	0	$19,302	
2017	0	0	0	$58,369	
2018	0	0	0	$63,751	
2019	0	0	0	$65,589	
Career *	0	0	0	* $245,275	

* As of 20 May 2019

== National participation ==
=== Davis Cup (2 wins, 0 losses) ===
Domingues debuted for the Portugal Davis Cup team in 2015 and has played 2 matches in 2 ties. His singles record is 2–0 and his doubles record is 0–0 (2–0 overall).

Group membership World Group (0–0) WG Play-off (0–0) Group I (1–0) Group II (1–0) Group III (0–0) Group IV (0–0)	Matches by surface Hard (1–0) Clay (1–0) Grass (0–0) Carpet (0–0)	Matches by Type Singles (2–0) Doubles (0–0)	Matches by Setting Indoors (1–0) Outdoors (1–0)	Matches by Venue Portugal (2–0) Away (0–0)

- ▲ ▼ indicates the result of the Davis Cup match followed by the score, date, place of event, the zonal classification and its phase, and the court surface.

Rubber result	Rubber	Match type (partner if any)	Opponent nation	Opponent player(s)	Score
▲4–1; 6–8 March 2015; Centro Desportivo do Jamor, Cruz Quebrada, Portugal; Group II Europe/Africa first round; Hard(i) surface
Victory	V	Singles (dead rubber)	Morocco	Mehdi Jdi	6–2, 7–5
▲5–0; 16–18 September 2016; Clube de Ténis de Viana, Viana do Castelo, Portugal; Group I Europe/Africa second round playoffs; Clay surface
Victory	V	Singles (dead rubber)	Slovenia	Tom Kočevar-Dešman	6–4, 6–3

== See also ==
- Portugal Davis Cup team
