= Braga Open =

Tennis tournament in Portugal

- 2025 Braga Open

ATP Challenger Tour
- Event name: Braga Open
- Location: Braga, Portugal
- Venue: Clube Ténis Braga
- Category: ATP Challenger Tour
- Surface: Clay
- Draw: 32S/32Q/16D
- Prize money: €91,250 (2025), €43,000 + H
- Website: Website

The Braga Open is a professional tennis tournament played on outdoor clay courts. It is currently part of the ATP Challenger Tour. It is held annually in Braga, Portugal since 2018. The tournament has been installed with Braga's nomination as European City of Sport in 2018.

== Past finals ==
=== Singles ===
Year	Champion	Runner-up	Score
2026	(Croatia) Matej Dodig	(Denmark) Elmer Møller	3–6, 6–3, 6–2
2025	(Croatia) Luka Mikrut	(Lithuania) Vilius Gaubas	6–3, 6–4
2024	(Denmark) Elmer Møller	(Colombia) Daniel Elahi Galán	6–4, 7–6^{(7–4)}
2023	(Spain) Oriol Roca Batalla	(Croatia) Duje Ajduković	4–6, 6–1, 6–1
2022	(United States) Nicolas Moreno de Alboran	(Brazil) Matheus Pucinelli de Almeida	6–2, 6–4
2021	(Brazil) Thiago Monteiro	(Serbia) Nikola Milojević	7–5, 7–5
2020	Not held		
2019	(Portugal) João Domingues	(Argentina) Facundo Bagnis	6–7^{(5–7)}, 6–2, 6–3
2018	(Portugal) Pedro Sousa	(Norway) Casper Ruud	6–0, 3–6, 6–3

=== Doubles ===
Year	Champions	Runners-up	Score
2026	(Morocco) Younes Lalami (Spain) Mario Mansilla Díez	(Poland) Karol Drzewiecki (Croatia) Admir Kalender	6–3, 2–6, [16–14]
2025	(Brazil) Marcelo Demoliner (Brazil) Orlando Luz	(Bulgaria) Alexander Donski (Serbia) Stefan Latinović	7–5, 5–7, [10–7]
2024	(France) Théo Arribagé (Portugal) Francisco Cabral	(Italy) Marco Bortolotti (Israel) Daniel Cukierman	6–3, 6–4
2023	(Italy) Marco Bortolotti (Romania) Alexandru Jecan	(Italy) Stefano Travaglia (Italy) Alexander Weis	7–5, 7–5
2022	(Czech Republic) Vít Kopřiva (Czech Republic) Jaroslav Pospíšil	(India) Jeevan Nedunchezhiyan (Indonesia) Christopher Rungkat	3–6, 6–3, [10–4]
2021	(Portugal) Nuno Borges (Portugal) Francisco Cabral	(Netherlands) Jesper de Jong (Netherlands) Bart Stevens	6–3, 6–7^{(4–7)}, [10–5]
2020	Not held		
2019	(Spain) Gerard Granollers (Brazil) Fabrício Neis	(Belgium) Kimmer Coppejans (Czech Republic) Zdeněk Kolář	6–4, 6–3
2018	(Netherlands) Sander Arends (Canada) Adil Shamasdin	(Uruguay) Ariel Behar (Mexico) Miguel Ángel Reyes-Varela	6–2, 6–1
