= 2025 Estoril Open – Singles =

Singles
- 2025 Estoril Open

Final
- Champion: (United States) Alex Michelsen
- Runner-up: (Italy) Andrea Pellegrino
- Score: 6–4, 6–4

Events
Singles	Doubles
← 2024 ·	Estoril Open	· 2026 →

Hubert Hurkacz was the defending champion but chose not to defend his title.

Alex Michelsen won the title after defeating Andrea Pellegrino 6–4, 6–4 in the final.

== Seeds ==
The top four seeds received a bye into the second round.

1. (Canada) Félix Auger-Aliassime (second round)
2. (United States) Alex Michelsen (champion)
3. (Portugal) Nuno Borges (quarterfinals)
4. (United States) Marcos Giron (second round)
5. (Serbia) Miomir Kecmanović (semifinals)
6. (Spain) Pedro Martínez (first round)
7. (Chile) Nicolás Jarry (quarterfinals)
8. (Brazil) João Fonseca (first round)

== Draw ==
=== Key ===
- Q = Qualifier
- WC = Wild card
- LL = Lucky loser
- Alt = Alternate
- ITF = ITF entry
- PR = Protected ranking
- SR = Special ranking
- SE = Special exempt
- JE = Junior exempt
- JR = Junior Accelerator Programme entrant
- CO = College Accelerator Programme entrant
- NG = Next Gen Accelerator Program entrant
- w/o = Walkover
- r = Retired
- d = Defaulted

=== Finals ===
Semifinals
Q	(Italy) Andrea Pellegrino	6	6
(Australia) Aleksandar Vukic	4	4
5	(Serbia) Miomir Kecmanović	4	2
2	(United States) Alex Michelsen	6	6

Final
Q	(Italy) Andrea Pellegrino	4	4
2	(United States) Alex Michelsen	6	6

=== Top half ===
First round
Alt	(Serbia) D Lajović	5	7^{7}	3
Q	(Italy) A Pellegrino	7	6^{2}	6
(United States) L Tien	7	5	4
WC	(Portugal) G Elias	5	7	6
WC	(Portugal) H Rocha	7^{15}	3	4
7	(Chile) N Jarry	6^{13}	6	6
(Australia) A Vukic	6	2	6
Alt	(United States) N Moreno de Alboran	3	6	0
(Portugal) J Faria	3	6^{2}
LL	(Spain) B Zapata Miralles	6	7^{7}
(Netherlands) J de Jong	6	7
8	(Brazil) J Fonseca	2	5

Second round
1/WC	(Canada) F Auger-Aliassime	5	4
Q	(Italy) A Pellegrino	7	6
WC	(Portugal) G Elias	2	6	5
7	(Chile) N Jarry	6	4	7
4	(United States) M Giron	3	1
(Australia) A Vukic	6	6
LL	(Spain) B Zapata Miralles	6	7^{7}
(Netherlands) J de Jong	4	6^{1}

Quarterfinals
Q	(Italy) A Pellegrino	7^{7}	5	6
7	(Chile) N Jarry	6^{0}	7	1
(Australia) A Vukic	6	6
LL	(Spain) B Zapata Miralles	1	1

Semifinals
Q	(Italy) A Pellegrino	6	6
(Australia) A Vukic	4	4

=== Bottom half ===
First round
5	(Serbia) M Kecmanović	6	7
(Germany) J-L Struff	1	5
Alt	(Belgium) K Coppejans	2	4
LL	(Kazakhstan) D Yevseyev	6	6
Q	(Italy) G Zeppieri	6	6^{3}	1
(Hungary) M Fucsovics	2	7^{7}	6
6	(Spain) P Martínez	4	3
Q	A Vatutin	6	6
(Italy) L Nardi	6	6
(United States) A Kovacevic	2	3
Alt	(Germany) Y Hanfmann	3	4
Q	(Italy) G Fonio	6	6

Second round
5	(Serbia) M Kecmanović	6	3	7
LL	(Kazakhstan) D Yevseyev	1	6	5
(Hungary) M Fucsovics	6^{6}	7^{7}	4
3	(Portugal) N Borges	7^{8}	6^{4}	6
Q	A Vatutin	3	2
(Italy) L Nardi	6	6
Q	(Italy) G Fonio	4	6^{3}
2	(United States) A Michelsen	6	7^{7}

Quarterfinals
5	(Serbia) M Kecmanović	6	6^{5}	6
3	(Portugal) N Borges	0	7^{7}	4
(Italy) L Nardi	3	4
2	(United States) A Michelsen	6	6

Semifinals
5	(Serbia) M Kecmanović	4	2
2	(United States) A Michelsen	6	6
