= 2023 Girona Challenger – Singles =

Singles
- 2023 Girona Challenger

Final
- Champion: Ivan Gakhov
- Runner-up: (Portugal) Gastão Elias
- Score: 5–7, 6–4, 0–0 ret.

Events
Singles	Doubles
- Girona Challenger

This was the first edition of the tournament.

Ivan Gakhov won the title after Gastão Elias retired before the start of the third set in the final, after Gakhov won the second set 6–4 after losing the first 5–7.

== Seeds ==
1. (Argentina) Pedro Cachin (quarterfinals)
2. (Spain) Jaume Munar (quarterfinals)
3. (Spain) Pedro Martínez (semifinals)
4. (Hungary) Fábián Marozsán (second round)
5. (Italy) Raúl Brancaccio (second round)
6. (Kazakhstan) Timofey Skatov (quarterfinals)
7. (Portugal) João Sousa (second round)
8. (United Kingdom) Liam Broady (withdrew)
9. (Ukraine) Oleksii Krutykh (second round)

== Draw ==
Key

- Q = Qualifier
- WC = Wild card
- LL = Lucky loser
- Alt = Alternate
- ITF = ITF entry
- PR = Protected ranking
- SR = Special ranking
- SE = Special exempt
- JE = Junior exempt
- JR = Junior Accelerator Programme entrant
- CO = College Accelerator Programme entrant
- NG = Next Gen Accelerator Program entrant
- w/o = Walkover
- r = Retired
- d = Defaulted

=== Finals ===
Semifinals
Q	(Netherlands) Jesper de Jong	4	6	3
Alt	Ivan Gakhov	6	3	6
3	(Spain) Pedro Martínez	6	2	4
Alt	(Portugal) Gastão Elias	4	6	6

Final
Alt	Ivan Gakhov	5	6	0
Alt	(Portugal) Gastão Elias	7	4	0^{r}

=== Top half ===
First round
1	(Argentina) P Cachin	3	6	6
(Belgium) G-A Bailly	6	4	3
(Portugal) F Ferreira Silva	3	2
Q	(Argentina) JB Torres	6	6
(Italy) R Bonadio	2	1
Q	(Netherlands) J de Jong	6	6
LL	(Spain) P Martín Tiffon	2	1^{r}
9	(Ukraine) O Krutykh	6	3
4	(Hungary) F Marozsán	7^{7}	2	7^{7}
Q	(Spain) Á López San Martín	6^{3}	6	6^{5}
Q	(Jordan) A Shelbayh	3	6	4
Alt	I Gakhov	6	4	6
WC	(Spain) P Andújar	6	2	5
(Serbia) M Zekić	4	6	7
(France) L Lokoli	3	2
6	(Kazakhstan) T Skatov	6	6

Second round
1	(Argentina) P Cachin	6	6
Q	(Argentina) JB Torres	1	4
Q	(Netherlands) J de Jong	6	6
9	(Ukraine) O Krutykh	3	2
4	(Hungary) F Marozsán	4	5
Alt	I Gakhov	6	7
(Serbia) M Zekić	0	4
6	(Kazakhstan) T Skatov	6	6

Quarterfinals
1	(Argentina) P Cachin	5	2
Q	(Netherlands) J de Jong	7	6
Alt	I Gakhov	6	6
6	(Kazakhstan) T Skatov	1	4

Semifinals
Q	(Netherlands) J de Jong	4	6	3
Alt	I Gakhov	6	3	6

=== Bottom half ===
First round
7	(Portugal) J Sousa	3	6	6
(Argentina) A Collarini	6	2	4
Alt	(Argentina) M Navone	3	6	7^{7}
LL	(Spain) O Roca Batalla	6	3	6^{2}
WC	(Spain) P Llamas Ruiz	7	4	6
(Italy) L Giustino	5	6	4
(South Korea) G Campaña Lee	3	6^{2}
3	(Spain) P Martínez	6	7^{7}
5	(Italy) R Brancaccio	4	6	6
Q	(Spain) Àlex Martí Pujolràs	6	3	2
Alt	(Portugal) G Elias	6	6
Q	(France) T Droguet	4	2
(Romania) ND Ionel	3	6	7
(Argentina) M Trungelliti	6	1	5
(Czech Republic) D Svrčina	2	4
2/WC	(Spain) J Munar	6	6

Second round
7	(Portugal) J Sousa	2	6	4
Alt	(Argentina) M Navone	6	4	6
WC	(Spain) P Llamas Ruiz	2	6^{7}
3	(Spain) P Martínez	6	7^{9}
5	(Italy) R Brancaccio	6	2	6^{8}
Alt	(Portugal) G Elias	4	6	7^{10}
(Romania) ND Ionel	3	4
2/WC	(Spain) J Munar	6	6

Quarterfinals
Alt	(Argentina) M Navone	6^{2}	6	2
3	(Spain) P Martínez	7^{7}	4	6
Alt	(Portugal) G Elias	7^{10}	6
2/WC	(Spain) J Munar	6^{8}	3

Semifinals
3	(Spain) P Martínez	6	2	4
Alt	(Portugal) G Elias	4	6	6
