= 2024 Girona Challenger – Singles =

Singles
- 2024 Girona Challenger

Final
- Champion: (Spain) Pedro Martínez
- Runner-up: (Moldova) Radu Albot
- Score: 7–5, 6–4

Events
Singles	Doubles
- Girona Challenger

Ivan Gakhov was the defending champion but lost in the second round to Javier Barranco Cosano.

Pedro Martínez won the title after defeating Radu Albot 7–5, 6–4 in the final.

== Seeds ==
1. (Argentina) Pedro Cachín (withdrew)
2. (Spain) Pedro Martínez (champion)
3. (Chile) Cristian Garín (quarterfinals)
4. (Spain) Albert Ramos Viñolas (first round)
5. (France) Grégoire Barrère (first round)
6. (Spain) Bernabé Zapata Miralles (second round)
7. (Netherlands) Jesper de Jong (quarterfinals)
8. (Spain) Pablo Llamas Ruiz (first round)

== Draw ==
Key

- Q = Qualifier
- WC = Wild card
- LL = Lucky loser
- Alt = Alternate
- ITF = ITF entry
- PR = Protected ranking
- SR = Special ranking
- SE = Special exempt
- JE = Junior exempt
- JR = Junior Accelerator Programme entrant
- CO = College Accelerator Programme entrant
- NG = Next Gen Accelerator Program entrant
- w/o = Walkover
- r = Retired
- d = Defaulted

=== Finals ===
Semifinals
(Moldova) Radu Albot	6	6
LL	(Spain) Nikolás Sánchez Izquierdo	4	2
(Germany) Benjamin Hassan	4	5
2	(Spain) Pedro Martínez	6	7

Final
(Moldova) Radu Albot	5	4
2	(Spain) Pedro Martínez	7	6

=== Top half ===
First round
LL	(Spain) J Barranco Cosano	6	0	6
Q	(Kazakhstan) D Yevseyev	0	6	2
Q	(Austria) D Novak	3	5
I Gakhov	6	7
Alt	(Spain) D Rincón	4	6	4
WC	(Spain) C Taberner	6	4	6
(Moldova) R Albot	7^{8}	7
5	(France) G Barrère	6^{6}	5
4	(Spain) A Ramos Viñolas	3	5
WC	(Spain) A Moro Cañas	6	7
LL	(Portugal) J Sousa	7^{8}	4	6
Q	(United Kingdom) F Gill	6^{6}	6	4
Alt	(Estonia) M Lajal	5	2
Q	(Portugal) G Elias	7	6
LL	(Spain) N Sánchez Izquierdo	4	6	6
8	(Spain) P Llamas Ruiz	6	3	3

Second round
LL	(Spain) J Barranco Cosano	6	7
I Gakhov	4	5
WC	(Spain) C Taberner	4	1
(Moldova) R Albot	6	6
WC	(Spain) A Moro Cañas	4	2
LL	(Portugal) J Sousa	6	6
Q	(Portugal) G Elias	7	3	4
LL	(Spain) N Sánchez Izquierdo	5	6	6

Quarterfinals
LL	(Spain) J Barranco Cosano	6^{5}	3
(Moldova) R Albot	7^{7}	6
LL	(Portugal) J Sousa
LL	(Spain) N Sánchez Izquierdo	w/o

Semifinals
(Moldova) R Albot	6	6
LL	(Spain) N Sánchez Izquierdo	4	2

=== Bottom half ===
First round
6	(Spain) B Zapata Miralles	7^{7}	6
Alt	(Spain) O Roca Batalla	6^{5}	3
(United Kingdom) B Harris	3	3
(Germany) B Hassan	6	6
(United States) N Moreno de Alboran	4	6	6
Q	(Jordan) A Shelbayh	6	3	4
(Portugal) H Rocha	6	3	6^{9}
3	(Chile) C Garín	4	6	7^{11}
7	(Netherlands) J de Jong	6	6
(United Kingdom) J Choinski	3	3
(Italy) A Pellegrino	6	6
(Germany) R Molleker	3	0
Alt	(Argentina) M Trungelliti	7	1	7
WC	(Spain) N Álvarez Varona	5	6	5
Q	(Lithuania) V Gaubas	6^{9}	4
2	(Spain) P Martínez	7^{11}	6

Second round
6	(Spain) B Zapata Miralles	3	2
(Germany) B Hassan	6	6
(United States) N Moreno de Alboran	6^{3}	2
3	(Chile) C Garín	7^{7}	6
7	(Netherlands) J de Jong	4
(Italy) A Pellegrino	1^{r}
Alt	(Argentina) M Trungelliti	2	0^{r}
2	(Spain) P Martínez	6	1

Quarterfinals
(Germany) B Hassan	6	6
3	(Chile) C Garín	3	1
7	(Netherlands) J de Jong	6^{4}	6	2
2	(Spain) P Martínez	7^{7}	3	6

Semifinals
(Germany) B Hassan	4	5
2	(Spain) P Martínez	6	7
