= 2025 Girona Challenger – Singles =

Singles
- 2025 Girona Challenger

Final
- Champion: (Croatia) Marin Čilić
- Runner-up: (Denmark) Elmer Møller
- Score: 6–3, 6–4

Events
| Singles | Doubles |
- Girona Challenger

Pedro Martínez was the defending champion but chose not to defend his title.

Marin Čilić won the title after defeating Elmer Møller 6–3, 6–4 in the final.

== Seeds ==
1. (Hungary) Márton Fucsovics (second round)
2. (Kazakhstan) Alexander Shevchenko (first round)
3. (Bolivia) Hugo Dellien (first round)
4. (Netherlands) Jesper de Jong (semifinals)
5. (Serbia) Dušan Lajović (semifinals)
6. (Spain) Pablo Carreño Busta (quarterfinals)
7. (Argentina) Federico Coria (first round)
8. (Argentina) Juan Manuel Cerúndolo (first round)

== Draw ==
Key

- Q = Qualifier
- WC = Wild card
- LL = Lucky loser
- Alt = Alternate
- ITF = ITF entry
- PR = Protected ranking
- SR = Special ranking
- SE = Special exempt
- JE = Junior exempt
- JR = Junior Accelerator Programme entrant
- CO = College Accelerator Programme entrant
- NG = Next Gen Accelerator Program entrant
- w/o = Walkover
- r = Retired
- d = Defaulted

=== Finals ===
Semifinals
(Croatia) Marin Čilić | 6 | 6
4 | (Netherlands) Jesper de Jong | 4 | 4
5/WC | (Serbia) Dušan Lajović | 2 | 1
(Denmark) Elmer Møller | 6 | 6

Final
(Croatia) Marin Čilić | 6 | 6
(Denmark) Elmer Møller | 3 | 4

=== Top half ===
First round
1 | (Hungary) M Fucsovics | 6 | 6
Alt | (Lithuania) V Gaubas | 3 | 2
(Croatia) M Čilić | 6 | 6
(Spain) C Taberner | 4 | 3
(Spain) M Landaluce | 3 | 5
Q | (Bulgaria) I Radulov | 6 | 7
Q | (Argentina) P Cachin | 1 | 3
6 | (Spain) P Carreño Busta | 6 | 6
4 | (Netherlands) J de Jong | 6 | 6
Alt | (France) T Droguet | 3 | 2
Q | (Austria) F Misolic | 6 | 6
Q | (Spain) B Zapata Miralles | 3 | 3
(Portugal) H Rocha | 4 | 2
Q | (Austria) L Neumayer | 6 | 6
(Austria) S Ofner | 7^{7} | 6
8 | (Argentina) JM Cerúndolo | 6^{4} | 4

Second round
1 | (Hungary) M Fucsovics | 7^{7} | 6^{4} | 2
(Croatia) M Čilić | 6^{5} | 7^{7} | 6
Q | (Bulgaria) I Radulov | 2 | 7 | 6^{4}
6 | (Spain) P Carreño Busta | 6 | 5 | 7^{7}
4 | (Netherlands) J de Jong | 6 | 6
Q | (Austria) F Misolic | 3 | 1
Q | (Austria) L Neumayer | 6 | 2 | 2
(Austria) S Ofner | 4 | 6 | 6

Quarterfinals
(Croatia) M Čilić | 6 | 6
6 | (Spain) P Carreño Busta | 2 | 4
4 | (Netherlands) J de Jong | 4 | 6 | 7
(Austria) S Ofner | 6 | 1 | 5

Semifinals
(Croatia) M Čilić | 6 | 6
4 | (Netherlands) J de Jong | 4 | 4

=== Bottom half ===
First round
5/WC | (Serbia) D Lajović | 6 | 7
(Germany) H Squire | 4 | 5
(United Kingdom) J Choinski | 3 | 4
WC | (Spain) A Moro Cañas | 6 | 6
Alt | (Moldova) R Albot | 4 | 6 | 6
WC | (Spain) A Ramos Viñolas | 6 | 3 | 4
Q | (Kazakhstan) T Skatov | 6 | 6
3 | (Bolivia) H Dellien | 1 | 3
7 | (Argentina) F Coria | 6^{4} | 2
(Denmark) E Møller | 7^{7} | 6
(Norway) N Budkov Kjær | 6 | 3 | 7^{7}
(Germany) J Engel | 4 | 6 | 6^{5}
(France) U Blanchet | 3 | 6 | 6
(Argentina) M Trungelliti | 6 | 1 | 2
Alt | (Lebanon) B Hassan | 6 | 1 | 6
2 | (Kazakhstan) A Shevchenko | 4 | 6 | 4

Second round
5/WC | (Serbia) D Lajović | 6 | 6
WC | (Spain) A Moro Cañas | 2 | 2
Alt | (Moldova) R Albot | 4 | 6 | 6^{3}
Q | (Kazakhstan) T Skatov | 6 | 3 | 7^{7}
(Denmark) E Møller | 6 | 6
(Norway) N Budkov Kjær | 4 | 0
(France) U Blanchet | 7^{7} | 0 | 3
Alt | (Lebanon) B Hassan | 6^{5} | 6 | 6

Quarterfinals
5/WC | (Serbia) D Lajović | 6 | 6
Q | (Kazakhstan) T Skatov | 2 | 4
(Denmark) E Møller | 6 | 7^{7}
Alt | (Lebanon) B Hassan | 3 | 6^{3}

Semifinals
5/WC | (Serbia) D Lajović | 2 | 1
(Denmark) E Møller | 6 | 6
