= 2024 Girona Challenger – Doubles =

Doubles
- 2024 Girona Challenger

Final
- Champions: (Ecuador) Gonzalo Escobar (Kazakhstan) Aleksandr Nedovyesov
- Runners-up: (France) Jonathan Eysseric (France) Albano Olivetti
- Score: 7–6^{(7–1)}, 6–4

Events
Singles	Doubles
- Girona Challenger

Yuki Bhambri and Saketh Myneni were the defending champions but chose not to defend their title.

Gonzalo Escobar and Aleksandr Nedovyesov won the title after defeating Jonathan Eysseric and Albano Olivetti 7–6^{(7–1)}, 6–4 in the final.

== Seeds ==
1. (Ecuador) Gonzalo Escobar / (Kazakhstan) Aleksandr Nedovyesov (champions)
2. (Portugal) Francisco Cabral / (United Kingdom) Henry Patten (semifinals)
3. (Netherlands) Sander Arends / (Netherlands) Matwé Middelkoop (semifinals)
4. (France) Jonathan Eysseric / (France) Albano Olivetti (final)

== Draw ==
Key

- Q = Qualifier
- WC = Wild card
- LL = Lucky loser
- Alt = Alternate
- ITF = ITF entry
- PR = Protected ranking
- SR = Special ranking
- SE = Special exempt
- JE = Junior exempt
- JR = Junior Accelerator Programme entrant
- CO = College Accelerator Programme entrant
- NG = Next Gen Accelerator Program entrant
- w/o = Walkover
- r = Retired
- d = Defaulted

=== Draw ===
First round
1	(Ecuador) G Escobar (Kazakhstan) A Nedovyesov	6	4	[10]
(Sweden) F Bergevi (Netherlands) M Veldheer	3	6	[3]
(Netherlands) B Stevens (Greece) Pe Tsitsipas	2	0
(Germany) J Schnaitter (Germany) M Wallner	6	6
3	(Netherlands) S Arends (Netherlands) M Middelkoop	6	6
(India) A Chandrasekar (India) VS Prashanth	4	4
(Pakistan) A-u-H Qureshi (Spain) D Vega Hernández	7	6
(Sweden) A Göransson (United States) R Stalder	5	4
(Poland) P Matuszewski (Australia) MC Romios	6^{6}	6	[7]
(Italy) M Bortolotti (Spain) S Martos Gornés	7^{8}	4	[10]
WC	(Spain) P Martínez (Spain) C Taberner	5	3
4	(France) J Eysseric (France) A Olivetti	7	6
WC	(Spain) D Rincón (Spain) O Roca Batalla	6	4	[10]
(Netherlands) J de Jong (Germany) B Hassan	4	6	[6]
(India) S Balaji (Germany) A Begemann	4	3
2	(Portugal) F Cabral (United Kingdom) H Patten	6	6

Quarterfinals
1	(Ecuador) G Escobar (Kazakhstan) A Nedovyesov	6	6
(Germany) J Schnaitter (Germany) M Wallner	1	2
3	(Netherlands) S Arends (Netherlands) M Middelkoop	6	3	[10]
(Pakistan) A-u-H Qureshi (Spain) D Vega Hernández	4	6	[8]
(Italy) M Bortolotti (Spain) S Martos Gornés	3	2
4	(France) J Eysseric (France) A Olivetti	6	6
WC	(Spain) D Rincón (Spain) O Roca Batalla	4	2
2	(Portugal) F Cabral (United Kingdom) H Patten	6	6

Semifinals
1	(Ecuador) G Escobar (Kazakhstan) A Nedovyesov	6	1	[10]
3	(Netherlands) S Arends (Netherlands) M Middelkoop	3	6	[4]
4	(France) J Eysseric (France) A Olivetti	6^{4}	7^{7}	[10]
2	(Portugal) F Cabral (United Kingdom) H Patten	7^{7}	6^{2}	[6]

Final
1	(Ecuador) G Escobar (Kazakhstan) A Nedovyesov	7^{7}	6
4	(France) J Eysseric (France) A Olivetti	6^{1}	4
