= 2025 Girona Challenger – Doubles =

Doubles
- 2025 Girona Challenger

Final
- Champions: (India) Anirudh Chandrasekar (Spain) David Vega Hernández
- Runners-up: (France) Grégoire Jacq (Brazil) Orlando Luz
- Score: 6–4, 6–4

Events
Singles	Doubles
- Girona Challenger

Gonzalo Escobar and Aleksandr Nedovyesov were the defending champions but chose not to defend their title.

Anirudh Chandrasekar and David Vega Hernández won the title after defeating Grégoire Jacq and Orlando Luz 6–4, 6–4 in the final.

== Seeds ==
1. (France) Grégoire Jacq / (Brazil) Orlando Luz (final)
2. (Portugal) Francisco Cabral / (Netherlands) Bart Stevens (first round)
3. (Monaco) Romain Arneodo / (Germany) Andreas Mies (semifinals)
4. (Poland) Karol Drzewiecki / (Poland) Piotr Matuszewski (quarterfinals, retired)

== Draw ==
Key

- Q = Qualifier
- WC = Wild card
- LL = Lucky loser
- Alt = Alternate
- ITF = ITF entry
- PR = Protected ranking
- SR = Special ranking
- SE = Special exempt
- JE = Junior exempt
- JR = Junior Accelerator Programme entrant
- CO = College Accelerator Programme entrant
- NG = Next Gen Accelerator Program entrant
- w/o = Walkover
- r = Retired
- d = Defaulted

=== Draw ===
First round
1	(France) G Jacq (Brazil) O Luz	6	7^{7}
(India) N Kaliyanda Poonacha (Spain) S Martos Gornés	4	6^{3}
WC	(Spain) O Roca Batalla (Argentina) M Trungelliti	6	6
(India) S Myneni (India) R Ramanathan	2	2
3	(Monaco) R Arneodo (Germany) A Mies	w/o
(Kazakhstan) A Shevchenko (Kazakhstan) D Yevseyev
WC	(Spain) J Barranco Cosano (Spain) Oriol Font	4	4
(Denmark) J Ingildsen (United Kingdom) D Stevenson	6	6
(Czech Republic) M Vocel (Poland) S Walków	6	3	[10]
(Italy) M Bortolotti (Romania) V Cornea	2	6	[7]
(Israel) D Cukierman (United Kingdom) J Paris	6	6^{4}	[6]
4	(Poland) K Drzewiecki (Poland) P Matuszewski	4	7^{7}	[10]
(India) J Nedunchezhiyan (India) VS Prashanth	3	4
(India) A Chandrasekar (Spain) D Vega Hernández	6	6
(Spain) Í Cervantes (Spain) D Rincón	1	6	[10]
2	(Portugal) F Cabral (Netherlands) B Stevens	6	3	[8]

Quarterfinals
1	(France) G Jacq (Brazil) O Luz	7^{7}	6
WC	(Spain) O Roca Batalla (Argentina) M Trungelliti	6^{3}	1
3	(Monaco) R Arneodo (Germany) A Mies	6	7^{9}
(Denmark) J Ingildsen (United Kingdom) D Stevenson	3	6^{7}
(Czech Republic) M Vocel (Poland) S Walków	7^{7}	0
4	(Poland) K Drzewiecki (Poland) P Matuszewski	6^{4}	0^{r}
(India) A Chandrasekar (Spain) D Vega Hernández	2	6	[11]
(Spain) Í Cervantes (Spain) D Rincón	6	4	[9]

Semifinals
1	(France) G Jacq (Brazil) O Luz	6	7^{7}
3	(Monaco) R Arneodo (Germany) A Mies	4	6^{5}
(Czech Republic) M Vocel (Poland) S Walków	3	6^{7}
(India) A Chandrasekar (Spain) D Vega Hernández	6	7^{9}

Final
1	(France) G Jacq (Brazil) O Luz	4	4
(India) A Chandrasekar (Spain) D Vega Hernández	6	6
