= 2023 Girona Challenger =

- Date: 27 March – 2 April
- Edition: 1st
- Surface: Clay
- Location: Girona, Spain

Champions

Singles
- Ivan Gakhov

Doubles
- (India) Yuki Bhambri / (India) Saketh Myneni
- Girona Challenger

The 2023 Girona Challenger, known as the ATP Challenger Eurofirms Girona Costa Brava, was a professional tennis tournament played on clay courts. It was the first edition of the tournament which was part of the 2023 ATP Challenger Tour. It took place in Girona, Spain between 27 March and 2 April 2023.

== Singles main-draw entrants ==
=== Seeds ===
Country	Player	Rank^{1}	Seed
ARG	Pedro Cachin	63	1
ESP	Jaume Munar	66	2
ESP	Pedro Martínez	121	3
HUN	Fábián Marozsán	128	4
ITA	Raúl Brancaccio	136	5
KAZ	Timofey Skatov	155	6
POR	João Sousa	156	7
~~GBR~~	~~Liam Broady~~	~~161~~	~~8~~
UKR	Oleksii Krutykh	167	9

- ^{1} Rankings are as of 20 March 2023.

=== Other entrants ===
The following players received wildcards into the singles main draw:

- (Spain) Pablo Andújar
- (Spain) Pablo Llamas Ruiz
- (Spain) Jaume Munar

The following players received entry into the singles main draw as alternates:

- (Portugal) Gastão Elias
- Ivan Gakhov
- (Argentina) Mariano Navone

The following players received entry from the qualifying draw:

- (Netherlands) Jesper de Jong
- (France) Titouan Droguet
- (Spain) Álvaro López San Martín
- (Spain) Àlex Martí Pujolràs
- (Jordan) Abedallah Shelbayh
- (Argentina) Juan Bautista Torres

The following players received entry as lucky losers:

- (Spain) Pol Martín Tiffon
- (Spain) Oriol Roca Batalla

== Champions ==
=== Singles ===
- Ivan Gakhov def. (Portugal) Gastão Elias 5–7, 6–4, 0–0 ret.

=== Doubles ===
- (India) Yuki Bhambri / (India) Saketh Myneni def. (Spain) Íñigo Cervantes / (Spain) Oriol Roca Batalla 6–4, 6–4.
