= 2025 Estoril Open – Doubles =

Doubles
- 2025 Estoril Open

Final
- Champions: (Uruguay) Ariel Behar (Belgium) Joran Vliegen
- Runners-up: (Portugal) Francisco Cabral (Austria) Lucas Miedler
- Score: 7–5, 6–3

Events
Singles	Doubles
- Estoril Open

Ariel Behar and Joran Vliegen won the doubles title at the 2025 Estoril Open after defeating Francisco Cabral and Lucas Miedler 7–5, 6–3 in the final.

Gonzalo Escobar and Aleksandr Nedovyesov were the defending champions, but chose not to defend their title.

== Seeds ==
1. (Uruguay) Ariel Behar / (Belgium) Joran Vliegen (champions)
2. (Portugal) Francisco Cabral / (Austria) Lucas Miedler (final)
3. (Germany) Jakob Schnaitter / (Germany) Mark Wallner (semifinals)
4. (Czech Republic) Petr Nouza / (Czech Republic) Patrik Rikl (semifinals)

== Draw ==
Key

- Q = Qualifier
- WC = Wild card
- LL = Lucky loser
- Alt = Alternate
- ITF = ITF entry
- PR = Protected ranking
- SR = Special ranking
- SE = Special exempt
- JE = Junior exempt
- JR = Junior Accelerator Programme entrant
- CO = College Accelerator Programme entrant
- NG = Next Gen Accelerator Program entrant
- w/o = Walkover
- r = Retired
- d = Defaulted

=== Draw ===
First round
1	(Uruguay) A Behar (Belgium) J Vliegen	7^{7}	6
(Germany) A Mies (Spain) D Vega Hernández	6^{4}	4
Alt	I Gakhov (Spain) Àlex Martí Pujolràs	6	3	[10]
(Portugal) G Elias (Portugal) T Pereira	2	6	[4]
3	(Germany) J Schnaitter (Germany) M Wallner	6	6
WC	(Portugal) Gonçalo da Rosa Castro (Portugal) Salvador Monteiro	3	1
WC	(Portugal) Pedro Araújo (Portugal) João Graça	6	0	[8]
(Kazakhstan) D Yevseyev (Kazakhstan) B Zhukayev	1	6	[10]
(Brazil) M Demoliner (France) G Jacq	6	6^{4}	[3]
(Colombia) N Barrientos (India) RC Bollipalli	3	7^{7}	[10]
PR	(Belgium) K Coppejans (Spain) S Martos Gornés	3	4
4	(Czech Republic) P Nouza (Czech Republic) P Rikl	6	6
(Italy) A Pellegrino; A Vatutin
(Poland) K Drzewiecki (Poland) P Matuszewski	w/o
(Portugal) Francisco Rocha (Portugal) H Rocha	3	2
2	(Portugal) F Cabral (Austria) L Miedler	6	6

Quarterfinals
1	(Uruguay) A Behar (Belgium) J Vliegen	6	6
Alt	I Gakhov (Spain) À Martí Pujolràs	1	3
3	(Germany) J Schnaitter (Germany) M Wallner	6	6
(Kazakhstan) D Yevseyev (Kazakhstan) B Zhukayev	2	1
(Colombia) N Barrientos (India) RC Bollipalli	1	7^{8}	[2]
4	(Czech Republic) P Nouza (Czech Republic) P Rikl	6	6^{6}	[10]
(Poland) K Drzewiecki (Poland) P Matuszewski	1	6	[4]
2	(Portugal) F Cabral (Austria) L Miedler	6	3	[10]

Semifinals
1	(Uruguay) A Behar (Belgium) J Vliegen	6	6
3	(Germany) J Schnaitter (Germany) M Wallner	4	4
4	(Czech Republic) P Nouza (Czech Republic) P Rikl	3	6	[5]
2	(Portugal) F Cabral (Austria) L Miedler	6	4	[10]

Final
1	(Uruguay) A Behar (Belgium) J Vliegen	7	6
2	(Portugal) F Cabral (Austria) L Miedler	5	3
