= 2026 AON Open Challenger – Doubles =

Doubles
- 2026 AON Open Challenger

Final
- Champions: (Serbia) Stefan Latinović (Croatia) Mili Poljičak
- Runners-up: (Croatia) Admir Kalender (Croatia) Nino Serdarušić
- Score: 7–6^{(7–1)}, 6–7^{(3–7)}, [10–6]

Events
Singles	Doubles
- AON Open Challenger

Mick Veldheer and Szymon Walków were the defending champions but only Veldheer chose to defend his title, partnering Tim Rühl. They lost in the quarterfinals to Pedro Martínez and Stefano Napolitano.

Stefan Latinović and Mili Poljičak won the title after defeating Admir Kalender and Nino Serdarušić 7–6^{(7–1)}, 6–7^{(3–7)}, [10–6] in the final.

== Seeds ==
1. (Poland) Karol Drzewiecki / (Poland) Piotr Matuszewski (quarterfinals)
2. (Croatia) Admir Kalender / (Croatia) Nino Serdarušić (final)
3. (Germany) Tim Rühl / (Netherlands) Mick Veldheer (quarterfinals)
4. (Serbia) Stefan Latinović / (Croatia) Mili Poljičak (champions)

== Draw ==
Key

- Q = Qualifier
- WC = Wild card
- LL = Lucky loser
- Alt = Alternate
- ITF = ITF entry
- PR = Protected ranking
- SR = Special ranking
- SE = Special exempt
- JE = Junior exempt
- JR = Junior Accelerator Programme entrant
- CO = College Accelerator Programme entrant
- NG = Next Gen Accelerator Program entrant
- w/o = Walkover
- r = Retired
- d = Defaulted

First round
1	(Poland) K Drzewiecki (Poland) P Matuszewski	w/o
(Italy) F Passaro (Italy) S Travaglia
WC	(Italy) Massimo Giunta (Italy) Alexander Weis	2	4
(Italy) F Forti (Italy) F Romano	6	6
4	(Serbia) S Latinović (Croatia) M Poljičak	6	6
WC	(Italy) Filippo Bordoni (Italy) Augusto Virgili	1	3
(Serbia) I Sabanov (Serbia) M Sabanov	6	6
(Croatia) D Ajduković (Ecuador) Á Guillén Meza	2	2
(Italy) E Dalla Valle (Italy) G Oradini	5	1
(Spain) P Martínez (Italy) S Napolitano	7	6
(Italy) F Agamenone (Italy) Simone Agostini	5	2
3	(Germany) T Rühl (Netherlands) M Veldheer	7	6
(Croatia) M Dodig (Serbia) Stefan Popović	6	6
(Spain) Ignasi Forcano (Netherlands) M Vervoort	3	1
(Italy) M Cecchinato (Italy) A Pellegrino	2	1
2	(Croatia) A Kalender (Croatia) N Serdarušić	6	6

Quarterfinals
1	(Poland) K Drzewiecki (Poland) P Matuszewski	5	6	[6]
(Italy) F Forti (Italy) F Romano	7	3	[10]
4	(Serbia) S Latinović (Croatia) M Poljičak	6	0
(Serbia) I Sabanov (Serbia) M Sabanov	1	0^{r}
(Spain) P Martínez (Italy) S Napolitano	6	7^{7}
3	(Germany) T Rühl (Netherlands) M Veldheer	3	6^{3}
(Croatia) M Dodig (Serbia) S Popović	5	6^{3}
2	(Croatia) A Kalender (Croatia) N Serdarušić	7	7^{7}

Semifinals
(Italy) F Forti (Italy) F Romano	6^{3}	3
4	(Serbia) S Latinović (Croatia) M Poljičak	7^{7}	6
(Spain) P Martínez (Italy) S Napolitano	3	4
2	(Croatia) A Kalender (Croatia) N Serdarušić	6	6

Final
4	(Serbia) S Latinović (Croatia) M Poljičak	7^{7}	6^{3}	[10]
2	(Croatia) A Kalender (Croatia) N Serdarušić	6^{1}	7^{7}	[6]
