= 2018 Copa Sevilla – Singles =

Singles
- 2018 Copa Sevilla

Final
- Champion: (Belgium) Kimmer Coppejans
- Runner-up: (Slovakia) Alex Molčan
- Score: 7–6^{(7–2)}, 6–1

Events
| Singles | Doubles |
| ← 2017 · | Copa Sevilla | · 2019 → |

Félix Auger-Aliassime was the defending champion but chose not to defend his title.

Kimmer Coppejans won the title after defeating Alex Molčan 7–6^{(7–2)}, 6–1 in the final.

== Seeds ==
1. (Portugal) Pedro Sousa (first round)
2. (Germany) Yannick Maden (first round)
3. (India) Ramkumar Ramanathan (first round)
4. (Argentina) Marco Trungelliti (second round)
5. (Norway) Casper Ruud (second round, retired)
6. (Spain) Daniel Gimeno Traver (first round)
7. (Slovakia) Andrej Martin (first round)
8. (Spain) Enrique López Pérez (first round)

== Draw ==
=== Key ===
- Q = Qualifier
- WC = Wild card
- LL = Lucky loser
- Alt = Alternate
- SE = Special exempt
- PR = Protected ranking
- ITF = ITF entry
- JE = Junior exempt
- w/o = Walkover
- r = Retired
- d = Defaulted
- SR = Special ranking

=== Finals ===
Semifinals
Q | (Slovakia) Alex Molčan | 4 | 6 | 6
(Bosnia and Herzegovina) Tomislav Brkić | 6 | 3 | 2
(Serbia) Peđa Krstin | 6 | 2 | 3
Q | (Belgium) Kimmer Coppejans | 4 | 6 | 6

Final
Q | (Slovakia) Alex Molčan | 6^{2} | 1
Q | (Belgium) Kimmer Coppejans | 7^{7} | 6

=== Top half ===
First round
1 | (Portugal) P Sousa | 6^{6} | 2
(Spain) P Martínez | 7^{8} | 6
Q | (Serbia) M Djokovic | 6 | 2 | 2
(France) K de Schepper | 4 | 6 | 6
Q | (Slovakia) A Molčan | 6 | 6
WC | (Spain) J Barranco Cosano | 2 | 1
(Czech Republic) A Pavlásek | 3 | 4
5 | (Norway) C Ruud | 6 | 6
4 | (Argentina) M Trungelliti | 5 | 6 | 6
WC | (Spain) N Kuhn | 7 | 4 | 4
(Croatia) A Pavić | 6 | 4 | 3
(Bosnia and Herzegovina) T Brkić | 4 | 6 | 6
(Italy) L Giustino | 6 | 6
(Italy) F Gaio | 4 | 2
(Spain) S Gutiérrez Ferrol | 6 | 6
7 | (Slovakia) A Martin | 3 | 0

Second round
(Spain) P Martínez | 4 | 3
(France) K de Schepper | 6 | 6
Q | (Slovakia) A Molčan | 6 | 2
5 | (Norway) C Ruud | 4 | 0^{r}
4 | (Argentina) M Trungelliti | 4 | 4
(Bosnia and Herzegovina) T Brkić | 6 | 6
(Italy) L Giustino | 7 | 3 | 3
(Spain) S Gutiérrez Ferrol | 5 | 6 | 6

Quarterfinals
(France) K de Schepper | 2 | 2
Q | (Slovakia) A Molčan | 6 | 6
(Bosnia and Herzegovina) T Brkić | 6 | 6^{7} | 6
(Spain) S Gutiérrez Ferrol | 3 | 7^{9} | 2

Semifinals
Q | (Slovakia) A Molčan | 4 | 6 | 6
(Bosnia and Herzegovina) T Brkić | 6 | 3 | 2

=== Bottom half ===
First round
8 | (Spain) E López Pérez | 5 | 4
(Serbia) P Krstin | 7 | 6
(Spain) R Ojeda Lara | 6^{5} | 4
(Egypt) M Safwat | 7^{7} | 6
WC | (Spain) A Davidovich Fokina | 6^{3} | 6 | 7^{7}
(Italy) A Giannessi | 7^{7} | 4 | 6^{5}
Q | (Lithuania) L Grigelis | 6 | 6
3 | (India) R Ramanathan | 4 | 2
6 | (Spain) D Gimeno Traver | 6^{5} | 4
Q | (Belgium) K Coppejans | 7^{7} | 6
(Russia) I Nedelko | 4 | 3
(Poland) K Majchrzak | 6 | 6
SE | (Argentina) F Argüello | 6 | 6
WC | (Argentina) P Cachin | 4 | 3
(Italy) M Donati | 6 | 6
2 | (Germany) Y Maden | 4 | 3

Second round
(Serbia) P Krstin | 6 | 2 | 6
(Egypt) M Safwat | 2 | 6 | 2
WC | (Spain) A Davidovich Fokina | 5 | 6 | 4
Q | (Lithuania) L Grigelis | 7 | 0 | 6
Q | (Belgium) K Coppejans | 3 | 7^{7} | 6
(Poland) K Majchrzak | 6 | 6^{0} | 2
SE | (Argentina) F Argüello | 5
(Italy) M Donati | 2^{r}

Quarterfinals
(Serbia) P Krstin | 2 | 6 | 6
Q | (Lithuania) L Grigelis | 6 | 3 | 4
Q | (Belgium) K Coppejans | 6 | 6^{4} | 6
SE | (Argentina) F Argüello | 3 | 7^{7} | 1

Semifinals
(Serbia) P Krstin | 6 | 2 | 3
Q | (Belgium) K Coppejans | 4 | 6 | 6
