= 2025 Estoril Open =

- Date: 29 April – 4 May
- Edition: 10th
- Category: ATP Challenger Tour
- Draw: 28S / 16D
- Surface: Clay / outdoor
- Location: Cascais, Portugal
- Venue: Clube de Ténis do Estoril

Champions

Singles
- (United States) Alex Michelsen

Doubles
- (Uruguay) Ariel Behar / (Belgium) Joran Vliegen
| ← 2024 · | Estoril Open | · 2026 → |

The 2025 Estoril Open (also known as the Millennium Estoril Open for sponsorship reasons) was a men's tennis tournament played on outdoor clay courts. It was the 10th edition of the tournament and an ATP Challenger Tour 175 event on the 2025 ATP Challenger Tour (downgraded from ATP 250 status in previous years). It took place at the Clube de Ténis do Estoril in Cascais, Portugal, from 29 April to 4 May 2025.

== Singles main draw entrants ==
=== Seeds ===
| Country | Player | Rank^{1} | Seed |
|---|---|---|---|
| CAN | Félix Auger-Aliassime | 19 | 1 |
| USA | Alex Michelsen | 38 | 2 |
| POR | Nuno Borges | 41 | 3 |
| USA | Marcos Giron | 45 | 4 |
| SRB | Miomir Kecmanović | 47 | 5 |
| ESP | Pedro Martínez | 48 | 6 |
| CHI | Nicolás Jarry | 57 | 7 |
| BRA | João Fonseca | 65 | 8 |

- ^{1} Rankings are as of 21 April 2025.

=== Other entrants ===
The following players received wildcards into the main draw:

- (Canada) Félix Auger-Aliassime
- (Portugal) Gastão Elias
- (Portugal) Henrique Rocha

The following players received entry into the singles main draw as alternates:

- (Belgium) Kimmer Coppejans
- (Tunisia) ~~Aziz Dougaz~~
- (Germany) Yannick Hanfmann
- (Serbia) Dušan Lajović
- (United States) Nicolas Moreno de Alboran
- (United States) ~~Ethan Quinn~~

The following players received entry from the qualifying draw:

- (Italy) Giovanni Fonio
- (Italy) Andrea Pellegrino
- Alexey Vatutin
- (Italy) Giulio Zeppieri

The following players received entry as lucky losers:

- (Kazakhstan) Denis Yevseyev
- (Spain) Bernabé Zapata Miralles

== Champions ==
=== Singles ===
- (United States) Alex Michelsen def. (Italy) Andrea Pellegrino 6–4, 6–4.

=== Doubles ===
- (Uruguay) Ariel Behar / (Belgium) Joran Vliegen def. (Portugal) Francisco Cabral / (Austria) Lucas Miedler 7–5, 6–3.
