= 2024 Estoril Open – Doubles =

Doubles
- 2024 Estoril Open

Final
- Champions: (Ecuador) Gonzalo Escobar (Kazakhstan) Aleksandr Nedovyesov
- Runners-up: (France) Sadio Doumbia (France) Fabien Reboul
- Score: 7–5, 6–2

Events
Singles	Doubles
- Estoril Open

Gonzalo Escobar and Aleksandr Nedovyesov defeated Sadio Doumbia and Fabien Reboul in the final, 7–5, 6–2 to win the doubles tennis title at the 2024 Estoril Open.

Sander Gillé and Joran Vliegen were the defending champions, but lost in the semifinals to Escobar and Nedovyesov.

== Seeds ==
1. (Belgium) Sander Gillé / (Belgium) Joran Vliegen (semifinals)
2. (France) Sadio Doumbia / (France) Fabien Reboul (final)
3. (Uruguay) Ariel Behar / (Czech Republic) Adam Pavlásek (first round)
4. (Ecuador) Gonzalo Escobar / (Kazakhstan) Aleksandr Nedovyesov (champions)

== Draw ==
Key

- Q = Qualifier
- WC = Wild card
- LL = Lucky loser
- Alt = Alternate
- ITF = ITF entry
- PR = Protected ranking
- SR = Special ranking
- SE = Special exempt
- JE = Junior exempt
- JR = Junior Accelerator Programme entrant
- CO = College Accelerator Programme entrant
- NG = Next Gen Accelerator Program entrant
- w/o = Walkover
- r = Retired
- d = Defaulted

=== Draw ===
First round
1	(Belgium) S Gillé (Belgium) J Vliegen	2	6	[10]
(Serbia) N Ćaćić (Ukraine) D Molchanov	6	3	[8]
(Netherlands) S Arends (Netherlands) M Middelkoop	6	6
(Ecuador) D Hidalgo (Colombia) C Rodríguez	3	1
4	(Ecuador) G Escobar (Kazakhstan) A Nedovyesov	6	6
(Argentina) P Cachín (Spain) P Martínez	3	2
(Romania) VV Cornea (Czech Republic) P Nouza	6	6^{3}	[10]
WC	(Portugal) J Faria (Portugal) H Rocha	4	7^{7}	[3]
(Brazil) M Demoliner (Netherlands) S Verbeek	6	4	[10]
WC	(Brazil) J Fonseca (Portugal) J Sousa	4	6	[5]
(Monaco) R Arneodo (Austria) S Weissborn	7^{7}	6^{6}	[10]
3	(Uruguay) A Behar (Czech Republic) A Pavlásek	6^{4}	7^{8}	[4]
(Germany) C Frantzen (Germany) H Jebens	6^{4}	7^{8}	[8]
(France) D Added (France) G Jacq	7^{7}	6^{6}	[10]
(Portugal) N Borges (Portugal) F Cabral	6^{5}	6	[7]
2	(France) S Doumbia (France) F Reboul	7^{7}	3	[10]

Quarterfinals
1	(Belgium) S Gillé (Belgium) J Vliegen	1	6	[11]
(Netherlands) S Arends (Netherlands) M Middelkoop	6	3	[9]
4	(Ecuador) G Escobar (Kazakhstan) A Nedovyesov	7^{8}	7^{7}
(Romania) VV Cornea (Czech Republic) P Nouza	6^{6}	6^{0}
(Brazil) M Demoliner (Netherlands) S Verbeek	4	4
(Monaco) R Arneodo (Austria) S Weissborn	6	6
(France) D Added (France) G Jacq	3	5
2	(France) S Doumbia (France) F Reboul	6	7

Semifinals
1	(Belgium) S Gillé (Belgium) J Vliegen	2	4
4	(Ecuador) G Escobar (Kazakhstan) A Nedovyesov	6	6
(Monaco) R Arneodo (Austria) S Weissborn	3	6^{3}
2	(France) S Doumbia (France) F Reboul	6	7^{7}

Final
4	(Ecuador) G Escobar (Kazakhstan) A Nedovyesov	7	6
2	(France) S Doumbia (France) F Reboul	5	2
