= 2023 Girona Challenger – Doubles =

Doubles
- 2023 Girona Challenger

Final
- Champions: (India) Yuki Bhambri (India) Saketh Myneni
- Runners-up: (Spain) Íñigo Cervantes (Spain) Oriol Roca Batalla
- Score: 6–4, 6–4

Events
Singles	Doubles
- Girona Challenger

This was the first edition of the tournament.

Yuki Bhambri and Saketh Myneni won the title after defeating Íñigo Cervantes and Oriol Roca Batalla 6–4, 6–4 in the final.

== Seeds ==
1. (India) Yuki Bhambri / (India) Saketh Myneni (champions)
2. (Serbia) Ivan Sabanov / (Serbia) Matej Sabanov (first round)
3. (Portugal) Francisco Cabral / (Portugal) João Sousa (semifinals)
4. (India) Purav Raja / (India) Divij Sharan (quarterfinals, withdrew)

== Draw ==
Key

- Q = Qualifier
- WC = Wild card
- LL = Lucky loser
- Alt = Alternate
- ITF = ITF entry
- PR = Protected ranking
- SR = Special ranking
- SE = Special exempt
- JE = Junior exempt
- JR = Junior Accelerator Programme entrant
- CO = College Accelerator Programme entrant
- NG = Next Gen Accelerator Program entrant
- w/o = Walkover
- r = Retired
- d = Defaulted

First round
1	(India) Y Bhambri (India) S Myneni	6	6
(Croatia) Z Babić (Poland) P Matuszewski	3	4
(France) T Arribagé (France) L Sanchez	4	7	[5]
(Brazil) O Luz (Brazil) M Zormann	6	5	[10]
3	(Portugal) F Cabral (Portugal) J Sousa	7^{8}	6
(Sweden) F Bergevi (Greece) Pe Tsitsipas	6^{6}	1
(Argentina) M Trungelliti (Serbia) M Zekić	6	5	[7]
(Uzbekistan) S Fayziev (Greece) M Kalovelonis	4	7	[10]
(France) L Lokoli (Hungary) F Marozsán	7^{7}	7^{9}
WC	(Spain) D Rincón (Jordan) A Shelbayh	6^{3}	6^{7}
WC	(Spain) Eduard Esteve Lobato (Spain) Á López San Martín	6^{4}	3
4	(India) P Raja (India) D Sharan	7^{7}	6
(Argentina) A Collarini (Portugal) G Elias	3	4
(Netherlands) J de Jong (Czech Republic) D Svrčina	6	6
(Spain) Í Cervantes (Spain) O Roca Batalla	6	6
2	(Serbia) I Sabanov (Serbia) M Sabanov	4	2

Quarterfinals
1	(India) Y Bhambri (India) S Myneni	4	7^{7}	[10]
(Brazil) O Luz (Brazil) M Zormann	6	6^{5}	[8]
3	(Portugal) F Cabral (Portugal) J Sousa	6	6
(Uzbekistan) S Fayziev (Greece) M Kalovelonis	3	0
(France) L Lokoli (Hungary) F Marozsán	w/o
4	(India) P Raja (India) D Sharan
(Netherlands) J de Jong (Czech Republic) D Svrčina
(Spain) Í Cervantes (Spain) O Roca Batalla	w/o

Semifinals
1	(India) Y Bhambri (India) S Myneni	6	5	[10]
3	(Portugal) F Cabral (Portugal) J Sousa	4	7	[2]
(France) L Lokoli (Hungary) F Marozsán
(Spain) Í Cervantes (Spain) O Roca Batalla	w/o

Final
1	(India) Y Bhambri (India) S Myneni	6	6
(Spain) Í Cervantes (Spain) O Roca Batalla	4	4
