= 2025 Girona Challenger =

- Date: 24 – 30 March
- Edition: 3rd
- Surface: Clay
- Location: Girona, Spain

Champions

Singles
- (Croatia) Marin Čilić

Doubles
- (India) Anirudh Chandrasekar / (Spain) David Vega Hernández
- Girona Challenger

The 2025 Girona Challenger, known as the ATP Challenger Eurofirms Girona Costa Brava, was a professional tennis tournament played on clay courts. It was the third edition of the tournament which was part of the 2025 ATP Challenger Tour. It took place in Girona, Spain between 24 and 30 March 2025.

== Singles main-draw entrants ==
=== Seeds ===
Country	Player	Rank^{1}	Seed
HUN	Márton Fucsovics	90	1
KAZ	Alexander Shevchenko	98	2
BOL	Hugo Dellien	103	3
NED	Jesper de Jong	105	4
SRB	Dušan Lajović	108	5
ESP	Pablo Carreño Busta	109	6
ARG	Federico Coria	124	7
ARG	Juan Manuel Cerúndolo	126	8

- ^{1} Rankings are as of 17 March 2024.

=== Other entrants ===
The following players received wildcards into the singles main draw:

- (Serbia) Dušan Lajović
- (Spain) Alejandro Moro Cañas
- (Spain) Albert Ramos Viñolas

The following players received entry into the singles main draw as alternates:

- (Moldova) Radu Albot
- (France) Titouan Droguet
- (Lithuania) Vilius Gaubas
- (Lebanon) Benjamin Hassan

The following players received entry from the qualifying draw:

- (Argentina) Pedro Cachin
- (Austria) Filip Misolic
- (Austria) Lukas Neumayer
- (Bulgaria) Iliyan Radulov
- (Kazakhstan) Timofey Skatov
- (Spain) Bernabé Zapata Miralles

== Champions ==
=== Singles ===
- (Croatia) Marin Čilić def. (Denmark) Elmer Møller 6–3, 6–4.

=== Doubles ===
- (India) Anirudh Chandrasekar / (Spain) David Vega Hernández def. (France) Grégoire Jacq / (Brazil) Orlando Luz 6–4, 6–4.
