= 2019 JC Ferrero Challenger Open – Doubles =

Doubles
- 2019 JC Ferrero Challenger Open

Final
- Champions: (Brazil) Thomaz Bellucci (Argentina) Guillermo Durán
- Runners-up: (Spain) Gerard Granollers (Spain) Pedro Martínez
- Score: 2–6, 7–5, [10–5]

Events
Singles	Doubles
- JC Ferrero Challenger Open

Wesley Koolhof and Artem Sitak were the defending champions but chose not to defend their title.

Thomaz Bellucci and Guillermo Durán won the title after defeating Gerard Granollers and Pedro Martínez 2–6, 7–5, [10–5] in the final.

== Seeds ==
1. (Brazil) Marcelo Demoliner / (India) Divij Sharan (first round)
2. (Germany) Kevin Krawietz / (Germany) Andreas Mies (semifinals)
3. (India) Jeevan Nedunchezhiyan / (India) Purav Raja (semifinals)
4. (Belgium) Sander Gillé / (Belgium) Joran Vliegen (first round)

== Draw ==
Key

- Q = Qualifier
- WC = Wild card
- LL = Lucky loser
- Alt = Alternate
- ITF = ITF entry
- PR = Protected ranking
- SR = Special ranking
- SE = Special exempt
- JE = Junior exempt
- JR = Junior Accelerator Programme entrant
- CO = College Accelerator Programme entrant
- NG = Next Gen Accelerator Program entrant
- w/o = Walkover
- r = Retired
- d = Defaulted

First round
1	(Brazil) M Demoliner (India) D Sharan	4	6	[12]
(Portugal) P Sousa (Netherlands) M Vervoort	6	3	[14]
ITF	(Spain) D Pérez Sanz (Australia) S Puodziunas	3	6^{5}
(Spain) G Granollers (Spain) P Martínez	6	7^{7}
3	(India) J Nedunchezhiyan (India) P Raja	6	5	[10]
(Brazil) F Neis (Spain) D Vega Hernández	4	7	[8]
WC	(Spain) Diego Augusto Barreto Sánchez (Brazil) Jordan Correia	2	4
(Spain) E López Pérez (Spain) D Marrero	6	6
(Serbia) N Milojević (Portugal) G Oliveira	3	4
(Brazil) T Bellucci (Argentina) G Durán	6	6
WC	(Spain) Á López San Martín (Spain) C Taberner	6	5	[10]
4	(Belgium) S Gillé (Belgium) J Vliegen	4	7	[8]
(United States) H Reese (Brazil) F Romboli	3	4
WC	(Spain) T Robredo (Spain) M Vilella Martínez	6	6
ITF	(Spain) J Barranco Cosano (Italy) R Brancaccio	2	1
2	(Germany) K Krawietz (Germany) A Mies	6	6

Quarterfinals
(Portugal) P Sousa (Netherlands) M Vervoort	7^{8}	4	[5]
(Spain) G Granollers (Spain) P Martínez	6^{6}	6	[10]
3	(India) J Nedunchezhiyan (India) P Raja	4	6	[10]
(Spain) E López Pérez (Spain) D Marrero	6	3	[8]
(Brazil) T Bellucci (Argentina) G Durán	w/o
WC	(Spain) Á López San Martín (Spain) C Taberner
WC	(Spain) T Robredo (Spain) M Vilella Martínez	2	4
2	(Germany) K Krawietz (Germany) A Mies	6	6

Semifinals
(Spain) G Granollers (Spain) P Martínez	7^{7}	6
3	(India) J Nedunchezhiyan (India) P Raja	6^{5}	1
(Brazil) T Bellucci (Argentina) G Durán	6	6
2	(Germany) K Krawietz (Germany) A Mies	4	4

Final
(Spain) G Granollers (Spain) P Martínez	6	5	[5]
(Brazil) T Bellucci (Argentina) G Durán	2	7	[10]
