= 2018 Copa Sevilla =

- Date: 3–8 September
- Edition: 21st
- Surface: Yellow clay
- Location: Seville, Spain

Champions

Singles
- (Belgium) Kimmer Coppejans

Doubles
- (Spain) Gerard Granollers / (Spain) Pedro Martínez
← 2017 ·	Copa Sevilla	· 2019 →

The 2018 Copa Sevilla was a professional tennis tournament played on clay courts. It was the 21st edition of the tournament which was part of the 2018 ATP Challenger Tour. It took place in Seville, Spain between 3 and 8 September 2018.

== Singles main-draw entrants ==
=== Seeds ===
Country	Player	Rank^{1}	Seed
POR	Pedro Sousa	116	1
GER	Yannick Maden	125	2
IND	Ramkumar Ramanathan	134	3
ARG	Marco Trungelliti	142	4
NOR	Casper Ruud	143	5
ESP	Daniel Gimeno Traver	155	6
SVK	Andrej Martin	157	7
ESP	Enrique López Pérez	159	8

- ^{1} Rankings are as of 27 August 2018.

=== Other entrants ===
The following players received wildcards into the singles main draw:

- (Spain) Javier Barranco Cosano
- (Argentina) Pedro Cachin
- (Spain) Alejandro Davidovich Fokina
- (Spain) Nicola Kuhn

The following player received entry into the singles main draw as a special exempt:

- (Argentina) Facundo Argüello

The following players received entry from the qualifying draw:

- (Belgium) Kimmer Coppejans
- (Serbia) Marko Djokovic
- (Lithuania) Laurynas Grigelis
- (Slovakia) Alex Molčan

== Champions ==
=== Singles ===
- (Belgium) Kimmer Coppejans def. (Slovakia) Alex Molčan 7–6^{(7–2)}, 6–1.

=== Doubles ===
- (Spain) Gerard Granollers / (Spain) Pedro Martínez def. (Spain) Daniel Gimeno Traver / (Spain) Ricardo Ojeda Lara 6–0, 6–2.
