= 2018 Copa Sevilla – Doubles =

Doubles
- 2018 Copa Sevilla

Final
- Champions: (Spain) Gerard Granollers (Spain) Pedro Martínez
- Runners-up: (Spain) Daniel Gimeno Traver (Spain) Ricardo Ojeda Lara
- Score: 6–0, 6–2

Events
Singles	Doubles
← 2017 ·	Copa Sevilla	· 2019 →

Pedro Cachin and Íñigo Cervantes were the defending champions but chose not to defend their title.

Gerard Granollers and Pedro Martínez won the title after defeating Daniel Gimeno Traver and Ricardo Ojeda Lara 6–0, 6–2 in the final.

== Seeds ==
1. (Brazil) Fabrício Neis / (Spain) David Vega Hernández (first round)
2. (Uruguay) Ariel Behar / (Spain) Enrique López Pérez (semifinals)
3. (Bosnia and Herzegovina) Tomislav Brkić / (Croatia) Ante Pavić (first round)
4. (Spain) Gerard Granollers / (Spain) Pedro Martínez (champions)

== Draw ==
=== Key ===
- Q = Qualifier
- WC = Wild card
- LL = Lucky loser
- Alt = Alternate
- SE = Special exempt
- PR = Protected ranking
- ITF = ITF entry
- JE = Junior exempt
- w/o = Walkover
- r = Retired
- d = Defaulted
- SR = Special ranking

First round
1	(Brazil) F Neis (Spain) D Vega Hernández	4	4
(Slovakia) A Martin (Chile) H Podlipnik Castillo	6	6
(Australia) R Junaid (Netherlands) D Pel	7^{7}	6
WC	(Spain) J Barranco Cosano (Spain) B Zapata Miralles	6^{5}	2
3	(Bosnia and Herzegovina) T Brkić (Croatia) A Pavić	6	4	[8]
WC	(Spain) D Gimeno Traver (Spain) R Ojeda Lara	4	6	[10]
Alt	(Venezuela) LD Martínez (Bolivia) F Zeballos	7	6
(Croatia) I Sabanov (Egypt) M Safwat	5	3
(Spain) D Pérez Sanz (Netherlands) M Vervoort	1	4
WC	(Portugal) F Gil (Spain) M Vilella Martínez	6	6
(Lithuania) L Grigelis (Italy) A Motti	4	2
4	(Spain) G Granollers (Spain) P Martínez	6	6
(Serbia) P Krstin (Ukraine) V Uzhylovskyi	3	4
(Serbia) N Čačić (Croatia) T Draganja	6	6
(Spain) S Martos Gornés (Norway) C Ruud	2	4
2	(Uruguay) A Behar (Spain) E López Pérez	6	6

Quarterfinals
(Slovakia) A Martin (Chile) H Podlipnik Castillo	3	7^{10}	[10]
(Australia) R Junaid (Netherlands) D Pel	6	6^{8}	[8]
WC	(Spain) D Gimeno Traver (Spain) R Ojeda Lara	6	6
Alt	(Venezuela) LD Martínez (Bolivia) F Zeballos	3	4
WC	(Portugal) F Gil (Spain) M Vilella Martínez	3	4
4	(Spain) G Granollers (Spain) P Martínez	6	6
(Serbia) N Čačić (Croatia) T Draganja	4	6^{5}
2	(Uruguay) A Behar (Spain) E López Pérez	6	7^{7}

Semifinals
(Slovakia) A Martin (Chile) H Podlipnik Castillo	3	6^{8}
WC	(Spain) D Gimeno Traver (Spain) R Ojeda Lara	6	7^{10}
4	(Spain) G Granollers (Spain) P Martínez	3	7^{7}	[10]
2	(Uruguay) A Behar (Spain) E López Pérez	6	6^{5}	[4]

Final
WC	(Spain) D Gimeno Traver (Spain) R Ojeda Lara	0	2
4	(Spain) G Granollers (Spain) P Martínez	6	6
