= 2019 JC Ferrero Challenger Open =

- Date: 1–7 April
- Edition: 2nd
- Surface: Clay
- Location: Villena, Alicante, Spain
- Venue: Ferrero Tennis Academy

Champions

Singles
- (Spain) Pablo Andújar

Doubles
- (Brazil) Thomaz Bellucci / (Argentina) Guillermo Durán
- JC Ferrero Challenger Open

The 2019 JC Ferrero Challenger Open was a professional tennis tournament played on clay courts. It was the second edition of the tournament which was part of the 2019 ATP Challenger Tour. It took place at the Ferrero Tennis Academy in Villena, Alicante, Spain, between 1 and 7 April 2019.

== Singles main-draw entrants ==
=== Seeds ===
Country	Player	Rank^{1}	Seed
ESP	Pablo Andújar	88	1
CZE	Jiří Veselý	100	2
POR	Pedro Sousa	105	3
ESP	Guillermo García López	112	4
ESP	Roberto Carballés Baena	113	5
SWE	Elias Ymer	116	6
BRA	Thiago Monteiro	117	7
CZE	Lukáš Rosol	133	8
ARG	Facundo Bagnis	142	9
ARG	Carlos Berlocq	143	10
ITA	Salvatore Caruso	157	11
ESP	Pedro Martínez	158	12
ITA	Andrea Arnaboldi	174	13
BEL	Arthur De Greef	176	14
SRB	Nikola Milojević	179	15
ESP	Alejandro Davidovich Fokina	181	16

- ^{1} Rankings are as of 18 March 2019.

=== Other entrants ===
The following players received wildcards into the singles main draw:

- (Spain) Carlos Alcaraz
- (Brazil) Jordan Correia
- (Spain) Álvaro López San Martín
- (Italy) Jannik Sinner
- (Spain) Carlos Taberner

The following players received entry into the singles main draw using their ITF World Tennis Ranking:

- (Spain) Javier Barranco Cosano
- (Italy) Riccardo Bonadio
- (Italy) Raúl Brancaccio
- (Spain) David Pérez Sanz

The following players received entry from the qualifying draw:

- (Brazil) Orlando Luz
- (Kazakhstan) Denis Yevseyev

== Champions ==
=== Singles ===
- (Spain) Pablo Andújar def. (Spain) Pedro Martínez 6–3, 3–6, 6–4.

=== Doubles ===
- (Brazil) Thomaz Bellucci / (Argentina) Guillermo Durán def. (Spain) Gerard Granollers / (Spain) Pedro Martínez 2–6, 7–5, [10–5].
