= 2019 JC Ferrero Challenger Open – Singles =

Singles
- 2019 JC Ferrero Challenger Open

Final
- Champion: (Spain) Pablo Andújar
- Runner-up: (Spain) Pedro Martínez
- Score: 6–3, 3–6, 6–4

Events
| Singles | Doubles |
- JC Ferrero Challenger Open

Defending champion Pablo Andújar defeated Pedro Martínez in the final, 6–3, 3–6, 6–4 to win the singles tennis title at the 2019 JC Ferrero Challenger Open.

This marked the Challenger debut of future world No. 1 Carlos Alcaraz; after defeating fellow future world No. 1 Jannik Sinner in the first round, he lost in the second round to Lukáš Rosol.

== Seeds ==
All seeds receive a bye into the second round.

1. (Spain) Pablo Andújar (champion)
2. (Czech Republic) Jiří Veselý (second round)
3. (Portugal) Pedro Sousa (quarterfinals)
4. (Spain) Guillermo García López (third round)
5. (Spain) Roberto Carballés Baena (second round)
6. (Sweden) Elias Ymer (third round)
7. (Brazil) Thiago Monteiro (second round)
8. (Czech Republic) Lukáš Rosol (third round, retired)
9. (Argentina) Facundo Bagnis (second round)
10. (Argentina) Carlos Berlocq (second round)
11. (Italy) Salvatore Caruso (quarterfinals)
12. (Spain) Pedro Martínez (final)
13. (Italy) Andrea Arnaboldi (second round)
14. (Belgium) Arthur De Greef (third round)
15. (Serbia) Nikola Milojević (third round)
16. (Spain) Alejandro Davidovich Fokina (third round)

== Draw ==
Key

- Q = Qualifier
- WC = Wild card
- LL = Lucky loser
- Alt = Alternate
- ITF = ITF entry
- PR = Protected ranking
- SR = Special ranking
- SE = Special exempt
- JE = Junior exempt
- JR = Junior Accelerator Programme entrant
- CO = College Accelerator Programme entrant
- NG = Next Gen Accelerator Program entrant
- w/o = Walkover
- r = Retired
- d = Defaulted

=== Finals ===
Quarterfinals
1 | (Spain) Pablo Andújar | 7^{7} | 7^{7}
(Portugal) João Domingues | 6^{4} | 6^{2}
WC | (Spain) Carlos Taberner | 3 | 6 | 6
11 | (Italy) Salvatore Caruso | 6 | 3 | 4
(Dominican Republic) José Hernández-Fernández | 4 | 7^{11} | 6
3 | (Portugal) Pedro Sousa | 6 | 6^{9} | 4
12 | (Spain) Pedro Martínez | 6 | 6
(Spain) Mario Vilella Martínez | 3 | 3

Semifinals
1 | (Spain) Pablo Andújar | 6 | 6
WC | (Spain) Carlos Taberner | 3 | 3
(Dominican Republic) José Hernández-Fernández | 6^{4} | 2
12 | (Spain) Pedro Martínez | 7^{7} | 6

Final
1 | (Spain) Pablo Andújar | 6 | 3 | 6
12 | (Spain) Pedro Martínez | 3 | 6 | 4

=== Top half ===
==== Section 1 ====
First round
(Russia) A Vatutin | 2 | 6 | 6
ITF | (Italy) R Bonadio | 6 | 3 | 2
(Austria) J Rodionov | 6 | 6
Q | (Brazil) O Luz | 3 | 3
(Portugal) J Domingues | 6 | 6
Q | (Kazakhstan) D Yevseyev | 4 | 3
WC | (Italy) J Sinner | 2 | 6 | 3
WC | (Spain) C Alcaraz | 6 | 3 | 6

Second round
1 | (Spain) P Andújar | 6 | 6
(Russia) A Vatutin | 3 | 4
(Austria) J Rodionov | 1 | 2
14 | (Belgium) A De Greef | 6 | 6
10 | (Argentina) C Berlocq | 4 | 4
(Portugal) J Domingues | 6 | 6
WC | (Spain) C Alcaraz | 2 | 6 | 4
8 | (Czech Republic) L Rosol | 6 | 4 | 6

Third round
1 | (Spain) P Andújar | 6 | 6
14 | (Belgium) A De Greef | 3 | 3
(Portugal) J Domingues | 7^{7} | 3
8 | (Czech Republic) L Rosol | 6^{2} | 0^{r}

Quarterfinals
1 | (Spain) P Andújar | 7^{7} | 7^{7}
(Portugal) J Domingues | 6^{4} | 6^{2}

==== Section 2 ====
First round
(Argentina) P Cachin | 6 | 6
(Italy) GM Moroni | 3 | 3
(Argentina) F Coria | 4 | 3
WC | (Spain) C Taberner | 6 | 6
(Argentina) F Argüello | 4 | 6 | 2
(Spain) D Gimeno Traver | 6 | 3 | 6
(Portugal) G Oliveira | 6 | 4 | 3
(Italy) L Giustino | 3 | 6 | 6

Second round
4 | (Spain) G García López | 6 | 6
(Argentina) P Cachin | 0 | 4
WC | (Spain) C Taberner | 6^{2} | 6 | 6
13 | (Italy) A Arnaboldi | 7^{7} | 1 | 4
11 | (Italy) S Caruso | 6 | 7
(Spain) D Gimeno Traver | 3 | 5
(Italy) L Giustino | 6 | 4 | 2
6 | (Sweden) E Ymer | 2 | 6 | 6

Third round
4 | (Spain) G García López | 7^{7} | 1 | 4
WC | (Spain) C Taberner | 6^{5} | 6 | 6
11 | (Italy) S Caruso | 6 | 4 | 6
6 | (Sweden) E Ymer | 2 | 6 | 2

Quarterfinals
WC | (Spain) C Taberner | 3 | 6 | 6
11 | (Italy) S Caruso | 6 | 3 | 4

=== Bottom half ===
==== Section 3 ====
First round
(Dominican Republic) J Hernández-Fernández | 4 | 6 | 7^{7}
(Spain) S Gutiérrez Ferrol | 6 | 3 | 6^{2}
ITF | (Spain) J Barranco Cosano | 3 | 6 | 3
WC | (Spain) Á López San Martín | 6 | 3 | 6
(Italy) F Gaio | 6 | 6
ITF | (Italy) R Brancaccio | 3 | 3
(Netherlands) T Griekspoor | 5 | 3
(Spain) T Robredo | 7 | 6

Second round
5 | (Spain) R Carballés Baena | 6 | 2 | 2
(Dominican Republic) J Hernández-Fernández | 2 | 6 | 6
WC | (Spain) Á López San Martín | 6 | 2 | 7^{7}
9 | (Argentina) F Bagnis | 4 | 6 | 6^{3}
16 | (Spain) A Davidovich Fokina | 6 | 6
(Italy) F Gaio | 2 | 2
(Spain) T Robredo | 1 | 1
3 | (Portugal) P Sousa | 6 | 6

Third round
(Dominican Republic) J Hernández-Fernández | 6 | 6
WC | (Spain) Á López San Martín | 4 | 1
16 | (Spain) A Davidovich Fokina | 2 | 6 | 0
3 | (Portugal) P Sousa | 6 | 4 | 6

Quarterfinals
(Dominican Republic) J Hernández-Fernández | 4 | 7^{11} | 6
3 | (Portugal) P Sousa | 6 | 6^{9} | 4

==== Section 4 ====
First round
(Spain) E López Pérez | 6 | 6
(Spain) N Kuhn | 2 | 2
ITF | (Spain) D Pérez Sanz | 0 | 5
(Czech Republic) A Pavlásek | 6 | 7
(Brazil) T Bellucci | 5 | 2
(Germany) K Krawietz | 7 | 6
WC | (Brazil) Jordan Correia | 1 | 0
(Spain) M Vilella Martínez | 6 | 6

Second round
7 | (Brazil) T Monteiro | 7^{7} | 5 | 3
(Spain) E López Pérez | 6^{4} | 7 | 6
(Czech Republic) A Pavlásek | 5 | 7^{7} | 4
12 | (Spain) P Martínez | 7 | 6^{3} | 6
15 | (Serbia) N Milojević | 7^{8} | 3 | 6
(Germany) K Krawietz | 6^{6} | 6 | 3
(Spain) M Vilella Martínez | 7 | 7^{7}
2 | (Czech Republic) J Veselý | 5 | 6^{5}

Third round
(Spain) E López Pérez | 6^{6} | 1
12 | (Spain) P Martínez | 7^{8} | 6
15 | (Serbia) N Milojević | 6 | 2 | 4
(Spain) M Vilella Martínez | 1 | 6 | 6

Quarterfinals
12 | (Spain) P Martínez | 6 | 6
(Spain) M Vilella Martínez | 3 | 3
