= 2026 AON Open Challenger – Singles =

Singles
- 2026 AON Open Challenger

Final
- Champion: (Brazil) Thiago Seyboth Wild
- Runner-up: (Spain) Pedro Martínez
- Score: 6–4, 6–2

Events
| Singles | Doubles |
- AON Open Challenger

Luciano Darderi was the defending champion but chose not to defend his title.

Thiago Seyboth Wild won the title after defeating Pedro Martínez 6–4, 6–2 in the final.

== Seeds ==
1. (Italy) Lorenzo Sonego (first round)
2. (Italy) Andrea Pellegrino (second round)
3. (Greece) Stefanos Sakellaridis (quarterfinals)
4. (Bolivia) Hugo Dellien (second round, retired)
5. (Germany) Tom Gentzsch (first round)
6. (Italy) Stefano Travaglia (second round)
7. (Spain) Pedro Martínez (final)
8. (Italy) Marco Cecchinato (first round)

== Draw ==
Key

- Q = Qualifier
- WC = Wild card
- LL = Lucky loser
- Alt = Alternate
- ITF = ITF entry
- PR = Protected ranking
- SR = Special ranking
- SE = Special exempt
- JE = Junior exempt
- JR = Junior Accelerator Programme entrant
- CO = College Accelerator Programme entrant
- NG = Next Gen Accelerator Program entrant
- w/o = Walkover
- r = Retired
- d = Defaulted

=== Finals ===
Semifinals
(Brazil) Thiago Seyboth Wild | 7 | 4 | 6
(Croatia) Matej Dodig | 5 | 6 | 2
(Serbia) Laslo Djere | 6 | 4 | 5
7 | (Spain) Pedro Martínez | 2 | 6 | 7

Final
(Brazil) Thiago Seyboth Wild | 6 | 6
7 | (Spain) Pedro Martínez | 4 | 2

=== Top half ===
First round
1 | (Italy) L Sonego | 6 | 4 | 4
(Italy) F Passaro | 3 | 6 | 6
(Peru) JP Varillas | 5 | 7 | 6
Q | (Italy) F Arnaboldi | 7 | 5 | 1
(Brazil) T Seyboth Wild | 6 | 6
Q | (Italy) G Ferrari | 3 | 4
Q | (Italy) Massimo Giunta | 6 | 7^{7}
5 | (Germany) T Gentzsch | 3 | 6^{1}
4 | (Bolivia) H Dellien | 6 | 6
PR | (Brazil) F Meligeni Alves | 3 | 2
(Italy) F Agamenone | 3 | 0^{r}
(Croatia) M Dodig | 6 | 4
Alt | (Italy) E Dalla Valle | 6 | 6
WC | (Italy) Gabriele Crivellaro | 2 | 1
(Italy) S Napolitano | 4 | 5
6 | (Italy) S Travaglia | 6 | 7

Second round
(Italy) F Passaro | 5 | 1
(Peru) JP Varillas | 7 | 6
(Brazil) T Seyboth Wild | 7 | 6
Q | (Italy) M Giunta | 5 | 3
4 | (Bolivia) H Dellien | 3^{r}
(Croatia) M Dodig | 5
Alt | (Italy) E Dalla Valle | 6^{3} | 6 | 6
6 | (Italy) S Travaglia | 7^{7} | 1 | 4

Quarterfinals
(Peru) JP Varillas | 1 | 6^{6}
(Brazil) T Seyboth Wild | 6 | 7^{8}
(Croatia) M Dodig | 6^{4} | 6 | 7^{7}
Alt | (Italy) E Dalla Valle | 7^{7} | 2 | 6^{5}

Semifinals
(Brazil) T Seyboth Wild | 7 | 4 | 6
(Croatia) M Dodig | 5 | 6 | 2

=== Bottom half ===
First round
8 | (Italy) M Cecchinato | 7^{7} | 6^{2} | 4
(Serbia) L Djere | 6^{2} | 7^{7} | 6
WC | (Italy) G Piraino | 7 | 6
(Switzerland) K Feldbausch | 5 | 3
Alt | (Croatia) D Ajduković | 6 | 7
Alt | (Italy) F Romano | 2 | 5
(Croatia) M Poljičak | 4 | 4
3 | (Greece) S Sakellaridis | 6 | 6
7 | (Spain) P Martínez | 7 | 7^{7}
Q | (Italy) F Forti | 5 | 6^{1}
Q | (Argentina) Máximo Zeitune | 6 | 4 | 7^{7}
Alt | (Ecuador) Á Guillén Meza | 2 | 6 | 6^{1}
Q | (Argentina) V Aboian | 7 | 2 | 6
WC | (Italy) Juan Cruz Martin Manzano | 5 | 6 | 1
LL | (Germany) Mika Petkovic | 6^{8} | 4
2 | (Italy) A Pellegrino | 7^{10} | 6

Second round
(Serbia) L Djere | 6 | 6
WC | (Italy) G Piraino | 2 | 1
Alt | (Croatia) D Ajduković | 6^{1} | 6 | 4
3 | (Greece) S Sakellaridis | 7^{7} | 2 | 6
7 | (Spain) P Martínez | 6 | 6
Q | (Argentina) M Zeitune | 2 | 1
Q | (Argentina) V Aboian | 6 | 6
2 | (Italy) A Pellegrino | 3 | 2

Quarterfinals
(Serbia) L Djere | 6 | 5 | 7
3 | (Greece) S Sakellaridis | 1 | 7 | 5
7 | (Spain) P Martínez | 6 | 6
Q | (Argentina) V Aboian | 1 | 2

Semifinals
(Serbia) L Djere | 6 | 4 | 5
7 | (Spain) P Martínez | 2 | 6 | 7
