= 2024 Estoril Open – Singles =

Singles
- 2024 Estoril Open

Final
- Champion: (Poland) Hubert Hurkacz
- Runner-up: (Spain) Pedro Martínez
- Score: 6–3, 6–4

Details
- Draw: 28 (4 Q / 3 WC )
- Seeds: 8

Events
Singles	Doubles
← 2023 ·	Estoril Open	· 2025 →

Hubert Hurkacz defeated Pedro Martínez in the final, 6–3, 6–4 to win the singles tennis title at the 2024 Estoril Open. It was his eighth career ATP Tour singles title, and his first on clay. Hurkacz became the first Polish man to win a main tour title on clay since Wojciech Stuchlik in 1981.

Casper Ruud was the defending champion, but lost in the semifinals to Martínez.

This marked the last professional appearance of four-time ATP Tour titlist and Portuguese player João Sousa. He lost to Arthur Fils in the first round.

== Seeds ==
The top four seeds received a bye into the second round.

1. (Norway) Casper Ruud (semifinals)
2. (Poland) Hubert Hurkacz (champion)
3. (Italy) Lorenzo Musetti (second round)
4. (Spain) Alejandro Davidovich Fokina (withdrew)
5. (France) Arthur Fils (second round)
6. (Serbia) Miomir Kecmanović (first round)
7. (France) Gaël Monfils (second round)
8. (Germany) Dominik Koepfer (first round)

== Draw ==
=== Key ===
- Q = Qualifier
- WC = Wild card
- LL = Lucky loser
- Alt = Alternate
- SE = Special exempt
- PR = Protected ranking
- ITF = ITF entry
- JE = Junior exempt
- w/o = Walkover
- r = Retired
- d = Defaulted
- SR = Special ranking

=== Finals ===
Semifinals
1	(Norway) Casper Ruud	4	6	4
(Spain) Pedro Martínez	6	4	6
(Chile) Cristian Garín	3	6	3
2	(Poland) Hubert Hurkacz	6	3	6

Final
(Spain) Pedro Martínez	3	4
2	(Poland) Hubert Hurkacz	6	6

=== Top half ===
First round
(Argentina) F Coria	4	6	1
(Netherlands) B van de Zandschulp	6	4	6
(Hungary) M Fucsovics	7	6
(Argentina) P Cachín	5	2
WC	(Portugal) H Rocha	5	5
7	(France) G Monfils	7	7
(Germany) M Marterer	1	7^{7}	4
(Austria) D Thiem	6	6^{3}	6
(Germany) D Altmaier	4	2
(Spain) P Martínez	6	6
(Spain) R Bautista Agut	6	7
6	(Serbia) M Kecmanović	1	5

Second round
1	(Norway) C Ruud	6	6
(Netherlands) B van de Zandschulp	1	2
(Hungary) M Fucsovics	1	6	7
7	(France) G Monfils	6	1	5
LL	(France) R Gasquet	6	7^{8}
(Austria) D Thiem	4	6^{6}
(Spain) P Martínez	7	6
(Spain) R Bautista Agut	5	4

Quarterfinals
1	(Norway) C Ruud	6	6
(Hungary) M Fucsovics	3	2
LL	(France) R Gasquet	4	4
(Spain) P Martínez	6	6

Semifinals
1	(Norway) C Ruud	4	6	4
(Spain) P Martínez	6	4	6

=== Bottom half ===
First round
5	(France) A Fils	7	6
WC	(Portugal) J Sousa	5	4
(Austria) J Rodionov	6^{3}	5
(Chile) C Garín	7^{7}	7
Q	(France) L Pouille	6	6^{6}	3
(Portugal) N Borges	0	7^{8}	6
8	(Germany) D Koepfer	4	3
Q	(Spain) P Llamas Ruiz	6	6
Q	(Portugal) J Faria	6^{4}	1
LL	(Spain) D Jordà Sanchis	7^{7}	6
Q	(United Kingdom) J Choinski	6	6^{5}	6
WC	(Brazil) J Fonseca	2	7^{7}	4

Second round
5	(France) A Fils	6	4	4
(Chile) C Garín	2	6	6
(Portugal) N Borges	7^{7}	6
3	(Italy) L Musetti	6^{4}	3
Q	(Spain) P Llamas Ruiz	7^{7}	6
LL	(Spain) D Jordà Sanchis	6^{2}	4
Q	(United Kingdom) J Choinski	6^{5}	4
2	(Poland) H Hurkacz	7^{7}	6

Quarterfinals
(Chile) C Garín	6	7^{7}
(Portugal) N Borges	2	6^{3}
Q	(Spain) P Llamas Ruiz	6^{4}	4
2	(Poland) H Hurkacz	7^{7}	6

Semifinals
(Chile) C Garín	3	6	3
2	(Poland) H Hurkacz	6	3	6

== Qualifying ==
=== Seeds ===
1. (Czech Republic) Vít Kopřiva (withdrew)
2. (France) Richard Gasquet (qualifying competition, lucky loser)
3. (Slovakia) Lukáš Klein (qualifying competition)
4. (Kazakhstan) Mikhail Kukushkin (first round)
5. (Spain) Pablo Llamas Ruiz (qualified)
6. (United Kingdom) Jan Choinski (qualified)
7. (Hungary) Máté Valkusz (first round)
8. (France) Lucas Pouille (qualified)

=== Qualifiers ===
1. (United Kingdom) Jan Choinski
2. (France) Lucas Pouille
3. (Portugal) Jaime Faria
4. (Spain) Pablo Llamas Ruiz

=== Lucky losers ===
1. (France) Richard Gasquet
2. (Spain) David Jordà Sanchis

=== Qualifying draw ===
==== First qualifier ====
First round
Alt	(Germany) Hendrik Jebens	4	2
WC	(Portugal) Duarte Vale	6	6
WC	(Portugal) Francisco Rocha	5	1
6	(United Kingdom) Jan Choinski	7	6

Qualifying competition
WC	(Portugal) Duarte Vale	3	4
6	(United Kingdom) Jan Choinski	6	6

==== Second qualifier ====
First round
2	(France) Richard Gasquet	6	6
(Portugal) Gastão Elias	3	2
(Portugal) Frederico Ferreira Silva	5	3
8	(France) Lucas Pouille	7	6

Qualifying competition
2	(France) Richard Gasquet	6	3	2
8	(France) Lucas Pouille	4	6	6

==== Third qualifier ====
First round
3	(Slovakia) Lukáš Klein	6	6
Alt	(Portugal) Pedro Araújo	3	0
(Portugal) Jaime Faria	6	6
7	(Hungary) Máté Valkusz	4	4

Qualifying competition
3	(Slovakia) Lukáš Klein	4	7^{7}	1
(Portugal) Jaime Faria	6	6^{3}	6

==== Fourth qualifier ====
First round
4	(Kazakhstan) Mikhail Kukushkin	3	6	4
(Spain) David Jordà Sanchis	6	2	6
(Ukraine) Eric Vanshelboim	1	0
5	(Spain) Pablo Llamas Ruiz	6	6

Qualifying competition
(Spain) David Jordà Sanchis	2	6^{2}
5	(Spain) Pablo Llamas Ruiz	6	7^{7}
