= 2024 Girona Challenger =

- Date: 25 – 31 March
- Edition: 2nd
- Surface: Clay
- Location: Girona, Spain

Champions

Singles
- (Spain) Pedro Martínez

Doubles
- (Ecuador) Gonzalo Escobar / (Kazakhstan) Aleksandr Nedovyesov
- Girona Challenger

The 2024 Girona Challenger, known as the ATP Challenger Eurofirms Girona Costa Brava, was a professional tennis tournament played on clay courts. It was the second edition of the tournament which was part of the 2024 ATP Challenger Tour. It took place in Girona, Spain between 25 and 31 March 2024.

== Singles main-draw entrants ==
=== Seeds ===
Country	Player	Rank^{1}	Seed
~~ARG~~	~~Pedro Cachín~~	~~79~~	~~1~~
ESP	Pedro Martínez	88	2
CHI	Cristian Garín	104	3
ESP	Albert Ramos Viñolas	105	4
FRA	Grégoire Barrère	121	5
ESP	Bernabé Zapata Miralles	145	6
NED	Jesper de Jong	151	7
ESP	Pablo Llamas Ruiz	152	8

- ^{1} Rankings are as of 18 March 2024.

=== Other entrants ===
The following players received wildcards into the singles main draw:

- (Spain) Nicolás Álvarez Varona
- (Spain) Alejandro Moro Cañas
- (Spain) Carlos Taberner

The following players received entry into the singles main draw as alternates:

- (Estonia) Mark Lajal
- (Spain) Daniel Rincón
- (Spain) Oriol Roca Batalla
- (Argentina) Marco Trungelliti

The following players received entry from the qualifying draw:

- (Portugal) Gastão Elias
- (Lithuania) Vilius Gaubas
- (United Kingdom) Felix Gill
- (Austria) Dennis Novak
- (Jordan) Abdullah Shelbayh
- (Kazakhstan) Denis Yevseyev

The following players received entry as lucky losers:

- (Spain) Javier Barranco Cosano
- (Spain) Nikolás Sánchez Izquierdo
- (Portugal) João Sousa

== Champions ==
=== Singles ===
- (Spain) Pedro Martínez def. (Moldova) Radu Albot 7–5, 6–4.

=== Doubles ===
- (Ecuador) Gonzalo Escobar / (Kazakhstan) Aleksandr Nedovyesov def. (France) Jonathan Eysseric / (France) Albano Olivetti 7–6^{(7–1)}, 6–4.
