= 2026 AON Open Challenger =

- Date: 7–13 September
- Edition: 22nd
- Surface: Clay
- Location: Genoa, Italy

Champions

Singles
- (Brazil) Thiago Seyboth Wild

Doubles
- (Serbia) Stefan Latinović / (Croatia) Mili Poljičak
- AON Open Challenger

The 2026 AON Open Challenger was a professional tennis tournament played on clay courts. It was the 22nd edition of the tournament which was part of the 2026 ATP Challenger Tour. It took place in Genoa, Italy between 7 and 13 September 2026.

== Singles main-draw entrants ==
=== Seeds ===
Country	Player	Rank^{1}	Seed
ITA	Lorenzo Sonego	89	1
ITA	Andrea Pellegrino	129	2
GRE	Stefanos Sakellaridis	136	3
BOL	Hugo Dellien	140	4
GER	Tom Gentzsch	145	5
ITA	Stefano Travaglia	147	6
ESP	Pedro Martínez	148	7
ITA	Marco Cecchinato	166	8

- ^{1} Rankings are as of 31 August 2026.

=== Other entrants ===
The following players received wildcards into the singles main draw:

- (Italy) Gabriele Crivellaro
- (Italy) Juan Cruz Martin Manzano
- (Italy) Gabriele Piraino

The following player received entry into the singles main draw using a protected ranking:

- (Brazil) Felipe Meligeni Alves

The following players received entry into the singles main draw as alternates:

- (Croatia) Duje Ajduković
- (Italy) Enrico Dalla Valle
- (Ecuador) Álvaro Guillén Meza
- (Italy) Filippo Romano

The following players received entry from the qualifying draw:

- (Argentina) Valerio Aboian
- (Italy) Federico Arnaboldi
- (Italy) Gianmarco Ferrari
- (Italy) Francesco Forti
- (Italy) Massimo Giunta
- (Argentina) Máximo Zeitune

The following player received entry as a lucky loser:

- (Germany) Mika Petkovic

== Champions ==
=== Singles ===
- (Brazil) Thiago Seyboth Wild def. (Spain) Pedro Martínez 6–4, 6–2.

=== Doubles ===
- (Serbia) Stefan Latinović / (Croatia) Mili Poljičak def. (Croatia) Admir Kalender / (Croatia) Nino Serdarušić 7–6^{(7–1)}, 6–7^{(3–7)}, [10–6].
