= 2024 Estoril Open =

- Date: 1 – 7 April
- Edition: 9th
- Category: ATP Tour 250
- Draw: 28S / 16D
- Prize money: €579,320
- Surface: Clay / outdoor
- Location: Cascais, Portugal
- Venue: Clube de Ténis do Estoril

Champions

Singles
- (Poland) Hubert Hurkacz

Doubles
- (Ecuador) Gonzalo Escobar / (Kazakhstan) Aleksandr Nedovyesov
- Estoril Open

The 2024 Estoril Open (also known as the Millennium Estoril Open for sponsorship reasons) was a men's tennis tournament played on outdoor clay courts. It was the 9th edition of the tournament and part of the ATP Tour 250 series of the 2024 ATP Tour. It took place at the Clube de Ténis do Estoril in Cascais, Portugal, from 1 to 7 April 2024.

== Champions ==
=== Singles ===
- (Poland) Hubert Hurkacz def. (Spain) Pedro Martínez, 6–3, 6–4

=== Doubles ===
- (Ecuador) Gonzalo Escobar / (Kazakhstan) Aleksandr Nedovyesov def. (France) Sadio Doumbia / (France) Fabien Reboul, 7–5, 6–2

== Singles main draw entrants ==
=== Seeds ===
Country	Player	Rank^{1}	Seed
NOR	Casper Ruud	8	1
POL	Hubert Hurkacz	9	2
ITA	Lorenzo Musetti	24	3
~~ESP~~	~~Alejandro Davidovich Fokina~~	~~28~~	~~4~~
FRA	Arthur Fils	37	5
SRB	Miomir Kecmanović	46	6
FRA	Gaël Monfils	47	7
GER	Dominik Koepfer	50	8

- ^{1} Rankings are as of 18 March 2024

=== Other entrants ===
The following players received wildcards into the main draw:

- (Brazil) João Fonseca
- (Portugal) Henrique Rocha
- (Portugal) João Sousa

The following players received entry from the qualifying draw:

- (United Kingdom) Jan Choinski
- (Portugal) Jaime Faria
- (Spain) Pablo Llamas Ruiz
- (France) Lucas Pouille

The following players received entry as lucky losers:

- (France) Richard Gasquet
- (Spain) David Jordà Sanchis

=== Withdrawals ===
- (France) Arthur Cazaux → replaced by (Germany) Maximilian Marterer
- (Spain) Alejandro Davidovich Fokina → replaced by (France) Richard Gasquet
- (France) Constant Lestienne → replaced by (Spain) David Jordà Sanchis

== Doubles main draw entrants ==
=== Seeds ===
Country	Player	Country	Player	Rank^{1}	Seed
BEL	Sander Gillé	BEL	Joran Vliegen	56	1
FRA	Sadio Doumbia	FRA	Fabien Reboul	63	2
URU	Ariel Behar	CZE	Adam Pavlásek	80	3
ECU	Gonzalo Escobar	KAZ	Aleksandr Nedovyesov	104	4

- Rankings are as of 18 March 2024

=== Other entrants ===
The following pairs received wildcards into the doubles main draw:

- (Portugal) Jaime Faria / (Portugal) Henrique Rocha
- (Brazil) João Fonseca / (Portugal) João Sousa

=== Withdrawals ===
- (Brazil) Marcelo Demoliner / (Brazil) Marcelo Melo → replaced by (Brazil) Marcelo Demoliner / (Netherlands) Sem Verbeek
- (France) Nicolas Mahut / (France) Édouard Roger-Vasselin → replaced by (Argentina) Pedro Cachín / (Spain) Pedro Martínez
- (Italy) Lorenzo Musetti / (Italy) Andrea Pellegrino → replaced by (France) Dan Added / (France) Grégoire Jacq
