= Girona Challenger =

- 2025 Girona Challenger

ATP Challenger Tour
- Event name: Girona Challenger
- Location: Girona, Spain
- Venue: Club Tenis Girona
- Category: ATP Challenger 100
- Surface: Clay
- Draw: 32S/24Q/16D
- Prize money: €145,250 (2025) €120,950 + H (2024)
- Website: Website

The Girona Challenger was a professional tennis tournament played on clay courts. It was part of the ATP Challenger Tour and was held in Girona, Spain since 2023. It was cancelled on the 2026 Challenger calendar.

== Past finals ==
=== Singles ===
Year	Champion	Runner-up	Score
2026	Not held		
2025	(Croatia) Marin Čilić	(Denmark) Elmer Møller	6–3, 6–4
2024	(Spain) Pedro Martínez	(Moldova) Radu Albot	7–5, 6–4
2023	Ivan Gakhov	(Portugal) Gastão Elias	5–7, 6–4, 0–0 ret.

=== Doubles ===
Year	Champions	Runners-up	Score
2026	Not held		
2025	(India) Anirudh Chandrasekar (Spain) David Vega Hernández	(France) Grégoire Jacq (Brazil) Orlando Luz	6–4, 6–4
2024	(Ecuador) Gonzalo Escobar (Kazakhstan) Aleksandr Nedovyesov	(France) Jonathan Eysseric (France) Albano Olivetti	7–6^{(7–1)}, 6–4
2023	(India) Yuki Bhambri (India) Saketh Myneni	(Spain) Íñigo Cervantes (Spain) Oriol Roca Batalla	6–4, 6–4
