= Ivan Gakhov =

Russian tennis player

Ivan Gakhov Иван Гахов
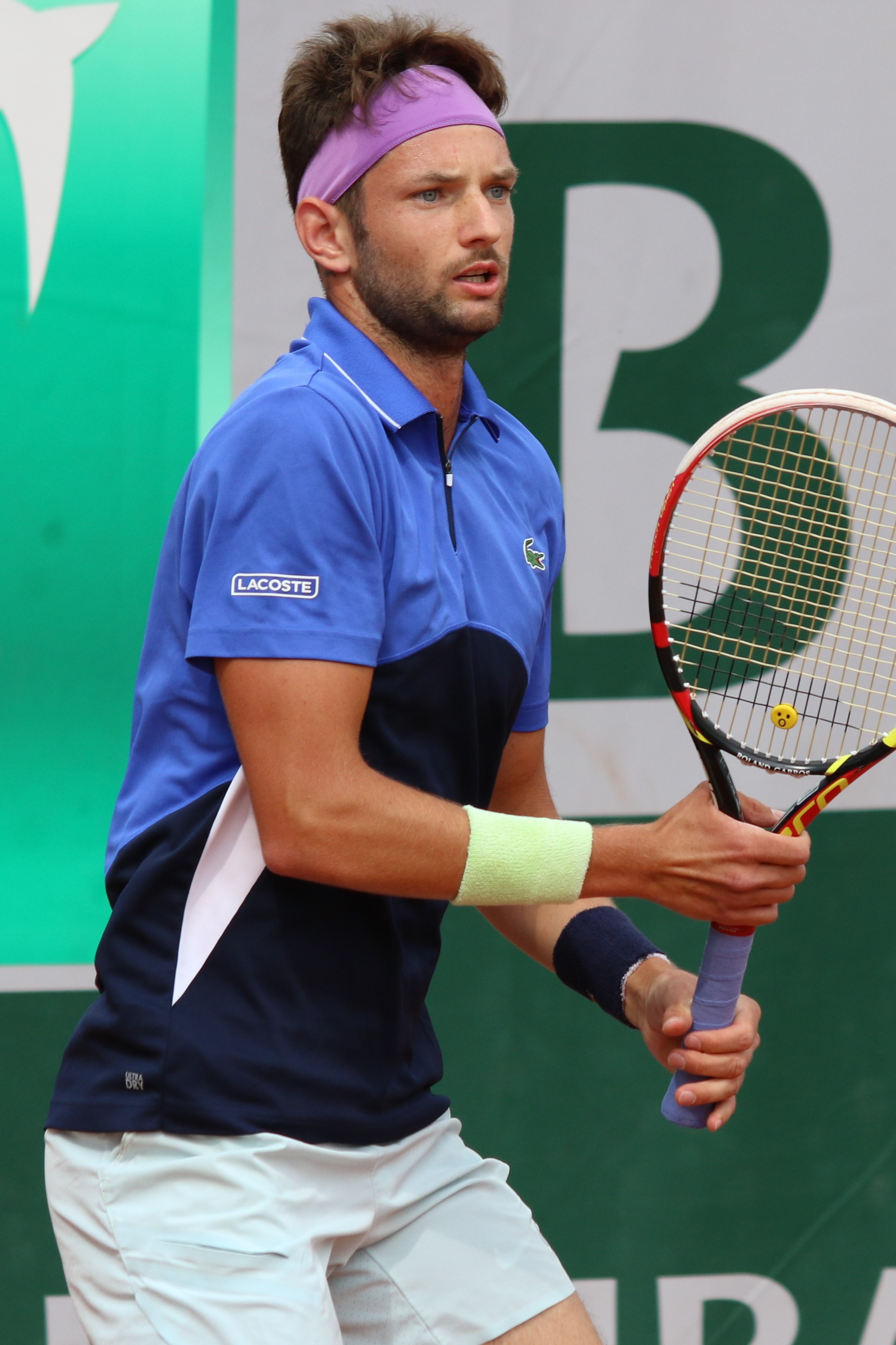
- Gakhov at the 2023 French Open
- Country (sports): Russia
- Residence: Barcelona, Spain
- Born: 4 November 1996 (age 29) Moscow, Russia
- Height: 1.91 m (6 ft 3 in)
- Plays: Left-handed (two-handed backhand)
- Coach: Miguel Sánchez, Salvador Navarro, Igor Muguruza, Axel Álvarez
- Prize money: US $542,490

Singles
- Career record: 1–4
- Career titles: 0
- Highest ranking: No. 142 (19 June 2023)
- Current ranking: No. 453 (14 September 2026)

Grand Slam singles results
- Australian Open: Q1 (2024)
- French Open: Q1 (2023)
- Wimbledon: Q1 (2023)
- US Open: Q1 (2023)

Doubles
- Career record: 0–1
- Career titles: 0
- Highest ranking: No. 170 (17 September 2018)
- Current ranking: No. 2,385 (14 September 2026)
Medal record
Men's tennis
Representing Russia
Summer Universiade
Gold medal – first place	2019 Naples	Mixed doubles
Silver medal – second place	2019 Naples	Team Classification
Bronze medal – third place	2019 Naples	Singles
- Last updated on: 18 September 2026.

Ivan Andreevich Gakhov (Russian: Ива́н Андре́евич Га́хов, IPA: [ɪˈvan ˈɡaxəf]; born 4 November 1996) is a Russian tennis player. He has a career high ATP singles ranking of world No. 142 achieved on 19 June 2023 and a doubles ranking of No. 170 achieved on 17 September 2018.

Gakhov has won two ATP Challenger titles in singles and one in doubles.

== Career ==
=== 2022: ATP debut ===
Ranked No. 315, he made his ATP singles main draw debut at the 2022 Generali Open Kitzbühel as a lucky loser where he lost to Yannick Hanfmann.

=== 2023: Maiden Challenger title, Masters debut and first ATP win, top 150 ===
He won his maiden ATP Challenger title in singles at the 2023 Girona Challenger.

Ranked No. 198, he made his Masters debut at the 2023 Monte-Carlo Masters after entering the qualifying competition as the fourth alternate, defeating second seed Adrian Mannarino and twelfth seed Luca Van Assche. In the first round of the main draw, he defeated Mackenzie McDonald to record his first ATP match win and first at the Masters 1000 tour-level, having played only one ATP match ever. As a result, he moved more than 35 spots in the rankings into the top 165. In the second round, he lost to top seed Novak Djokovic. He reached the top 150 at No. 147 on 12 June 2023.

=== 2024-2025: ATP main draw qualifying success ===
In mid-April 2024, ranked No. 223, he qualified for the main draw of the ATP 2024 BMW Open in Munich.

In mid-May 2025, he qualified for the main draw of the ATP 2025 Geneva Open.

== ATP Challenger Tour finals ==
=== Singles: 3 (2 titles, 1 runner-up) ===
Legend ATP Challenger Tour (2–1)

Result	W–L	Date	Tournament	Tier	Surface	Opponent	Score
Win	1–0	Apr 2023	Girona, Spain	Challenger	Clay	(Portugal) Gastão Elias	5–7, 6–4, 0–0 ret.
Win	2–0	Jun 2023	Troisdorf, Germany	Challenger	Clay	(Portugal) Frederico Ferreira Silva	6–2, 5–7, 6–3
Loss	2–1	Aug 2024	Dobrich, Bulgaria	Challenger	Clay	(Argentina) Juan Bautista Torres	7–5, 0–6, 5–7

=== Doubles: 4 (1 title, 3 runner-ups) ===
Legend ATP Challenger Tour (1–3)	Finals by surface Hard (1–0) Clay (0–3) Grass (0–0) Carpet (0–0)

Result	W–L	Date	Tournament	Tier	Surface	Partner	Opponents	Score
Loss	0–1	Sep 2017	Seville, Spain	Challenger	Clay	(Spain) David Vega Hernández	(Argentina) Pedro Cachín (Spain) Íñigo Cervantes	6–7^{(5–7)}, 6–3, [5–10]
Loss	0–2	Oct 2017	Almaty, Kazakhstan	Challenger	Clay	(Croatia) Nino Serdarušić	(Kazakhstan) Timur Khabibulin (Kazakhstan) Aleksandr Nedovyesov	6–1, 3–6, [3–10]
Win	1–2	Jun 2018	Fergana, Uzbekistan	Challenger	Hard	(Russia) Alexander Pavlioutchenkov	(India) Saketh Myneni (India) Vijay Sundar Prashanth	6–4, 6–4
Loss	1–3	Jul 2018	Tampere, Finland	Challenger	Clay	(Russia) Alexander Pavlioutchenkov	(Sweden) Markus Eriksson (Sweden) André Göransson	3–6, 6–3, [7–10]

== ITF Futures/World Tennis Tour finals ==
=== Singles: 30 (14 titles, 16 runner-ups) ===
Legend ITF Futures/WTT (14–16)	Finals by surface Hard (2–2) Clay (12–14) Grass (0–0) Carpet (0–0)

Result	W–L	Date	Tournament	Tier	Surface	Opponent	Score
Win	1–0	Oct 2014	Kazakhstan F12, Shymkent	Futures	Clay	(Spain) Enrique López Pérez	6–4, 6–0
Loss	1–1	Oct 2014	Kazakhstan F14, Shymkent	Futures	Clay	(Spain) Enrique López Pérez	3–6, 6–4, 1–6
Loss	1–2	Mar 2015	India F4, Chennai	Futures	Clay	(India) Vijay Sundar Prashanth	3–6, 6–3, 6–7^{(6–8)}
Loss	1–3	May 2015	Russia F1, Moscow	Futures	Clay	(Russia) Daniil Medvedev	4–6, 1–6
Loss	1–4	Oct 2015	Kazakhstan F5, Shymkent	Futures	Clay	(Georgia (country)) Aleksandre Metreveli	1–6, 2–6
Loss	1–5	Nov 2015	Turkey F46, Antalya	Futures	Clay	(Spain) Javier Martí	4–6, 4–6
Loss	1–6	Jul 2016	Spain F21, Gandia	Futures	Clay	(Spain) Jaume Munar	3–6, 4–6
Win	2–6	Aug 2016	Russia F6, Moscow	Futures	Clay	(Russia) Denis Matsukevich	1–6, 6–3, 6–3
Win	3–6	Oct 2016	Kazakhstan F7, Shymkent	Futures	Clay	(Uzbekistan) Sanjar Fayziev	6–2, 5–7, 6–2
Win	4–6	Oct 2016	Spain F35, La Vall d'Uixó	Futures	Clay	(Spain) Carlos Taberner	6–2, 6–2
Loss	4–7	Mar 2017	Spain F8, Reus	Futures	Clay	(Spain) Javier Martí	3–6, 4–6
Loss	4–8	Apr 2017	Spain F10, Madrid	Futures	Clay	(Argentina) Pedro Cachín	3–6, 3–6
Win	5–8	Apr 2017	Kazakhstan F5, Shymkent	Futures	Clay	(Spain) Mario Vilella Martínez	6–3, 6–2
Win	6–8	Aug 2017	Russia F6, Moscow	Futures	Clay	(Russia) Artur Shakhnubaryan	6–3, 6–3
Win	7–8	Nov 2017	Morocco F6, Agadir	Futures	Clay	(Spain) Pol Toledo Bagué	7–6^{(7–5)}, 7–5
Loss	7–9	Apr 2018	Kazakhstan F3, Shymkent	Futures	Clay	(Kazakhstan) Denis Yevseyev	4–6, 7–5, 4–6
Win	8–9	Aug 2018	Germany F12, Karlsruhe	Futures	Clay	(Germany) Paul Woerner	7–6^{(7–4)}, 6–3
Loss	8–10	Aug 2018	Spain F24, Santander	Futures	Clay	(Spain) Javier Barranco Cosano	3–6, 6–4, 4–6
Win	9–10	Nov 2018	Tunisia F39, Monastir	Futures	Hard	(Canada) Steven Diez	3–6, 6–2, 6–1
Win	10–10	Nov 2018	Tunisia F40, Monastir	Futures	Hard	(France) Ronan Joncour	7–6^{(9–7)}, 7–5
Loss	10–11	Nov 2018	Tunisia F41, Monastir	Futures	Hard	(Russia) Aslan Karatsev	4–6, 3–6
Loss	10–12	Jan 2019	M15 Manacor, Spain	WTT	Hard	(Argentina) Francisco Cerúndolo	3–6, 3–6
Loss	10–13	Nov 2020	M15 Benicarló, Spain	WTT	Clay	(Spain) Nicolás Álvarez Varona	6–7^{(13–15)}, 4–6
Win	11–13	Apr 2021	M15 Shymkent, Kazakhstan	WTT	Clay	(Ukraine) Eric Vanshelboim	6–3, 5–7, 7–5
Loss	11–14	Apr 2021	M15 Shymkent, Kazakhstan	WTT	Clay	(Ukraine) Eric Vanshelboim	1–6, 1–6
Win	12–14	Oct 2021	M15 Platja d'Aro, Spain	WTT	Clay	(Spain) Josè Vidal Azorín	6–4, 5–7, 6–2
Loss	12–15	Oct 2021	M15 Benicarló, Spain	WTT	Clay	(Spain) Pablo Llamas Ruiz	4–6, 4–6
Win	13–15	Apr 2022	M15 Symkent, Kazakhstan	WTT	Clay	(Ukraine) Eric Vanshelboim	6–3, 6–4
Win	14–15	Oct 2022	M25 Zaragoza, Spain	WTT	Clay	(Spain) Javier Barranco Cosano	6–4, 1–6, 6–2
Loss	14–16	Jul 2024	M25 Getxo, Spain	WTT	Clay	(Spain) Miguel Damas	0–6, 7–6^{(7–3)}, 0–6

== Awards ==
2019

- The Russian Cup in the nomination Student Tennis Players of the Year
