= Pedro Martínez (tennis) =

Spanish tennis player (born 1997)

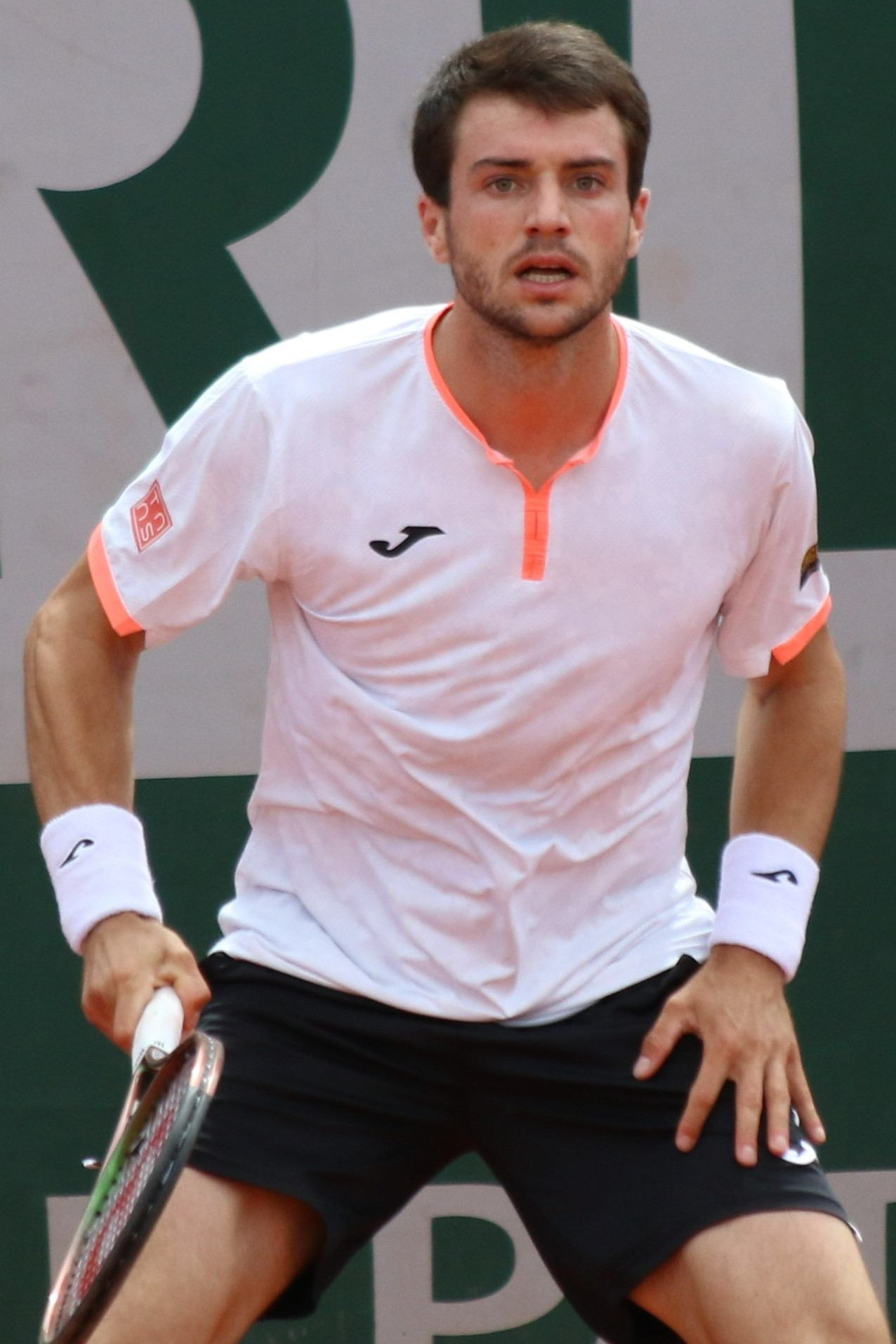
- Martínez at the 2022 French Open
- Full name: Pedro Martínez Portero
- Country (sports): Spain
- Born: 26 April 1997 (age 29) Alzira, Spain
- Height: 1.85 m (6 ft 1 in)
- Turned pro: 2016
- Plays: Right-handed (two-handed backhand)
- Coach: Javier Ferrer, Albert Ramos Viñolas, Thiago Leivas
- Prize money: US $6,099,157

Singles
- Career record: 87–127
- Career titles: 1
- Highest ranking: No. 36 (24 February 2025)
- Current ranking: No. 124 (2 November 2026)

Grand Slam singles results
- Australian Open: 3R (2021)
- French Open: 3R (2020)
- Wimbledon: 3R (2021, 2025)
- US Open: 2R (2021, 2024)

Other tournaments
- Olympic Games: 1R (2024)

Doubles
- Career record: 56–78
- Career titles: 1
- Highest ranking: No. 51 (16 May 2022)
- Current ranking: No. 603 (31 August 2026)

Grand Slam doubles results
- Australian Open: 3R (2022, 2025)
- French Open: SF (2021)
- Wimbledon: 2R (2022, 2024, 2025)
- US Open: 1R (2021, 2022, 2024)

Team competitions
- Davis Cup: 2–3
- Last updated on: 15 November 2026.

Pedro Martínez Portero (Spanish pronunciation: [ˈpeðɾo maɾˈtineθ]; born 26 April 1997) is a Spanish professional tennis player. He has a career high ATP singles ranking of world No. 36 achieved on 24 February 2025 and a doubles ranking of No. 51 achieved on 16 May 2022.

== Career ==
=== 2013: Juniors ===
During his junior career, he won the junior Davis Cup 2013.

=== 2018–2020: ATP, Major debuts, top 100 in singles ===
Martínez made his ATP main draw debut at the 2018 Grand Prix Hassan II after qualifying for the singles main draw.

Martínez made his Grand Slam debut in the main draw at the 2019 French Open in singles and at the 2020 French Open in doubles with Christian Garin.

He reached his first ATP quarterfinal in his career at the ATP 500 2020 Rio Open in Brazil defeating Hugo Dellien and Pablo Andujar. He made the third round of the 2020 French Open in singles, his best Grand Slam result thus far. As a result he entered the top 100 in singles at World No. 97 on 12 October 2020.

=== 2021: Major semifinal & top 100 in doubles, singles ATP final ===
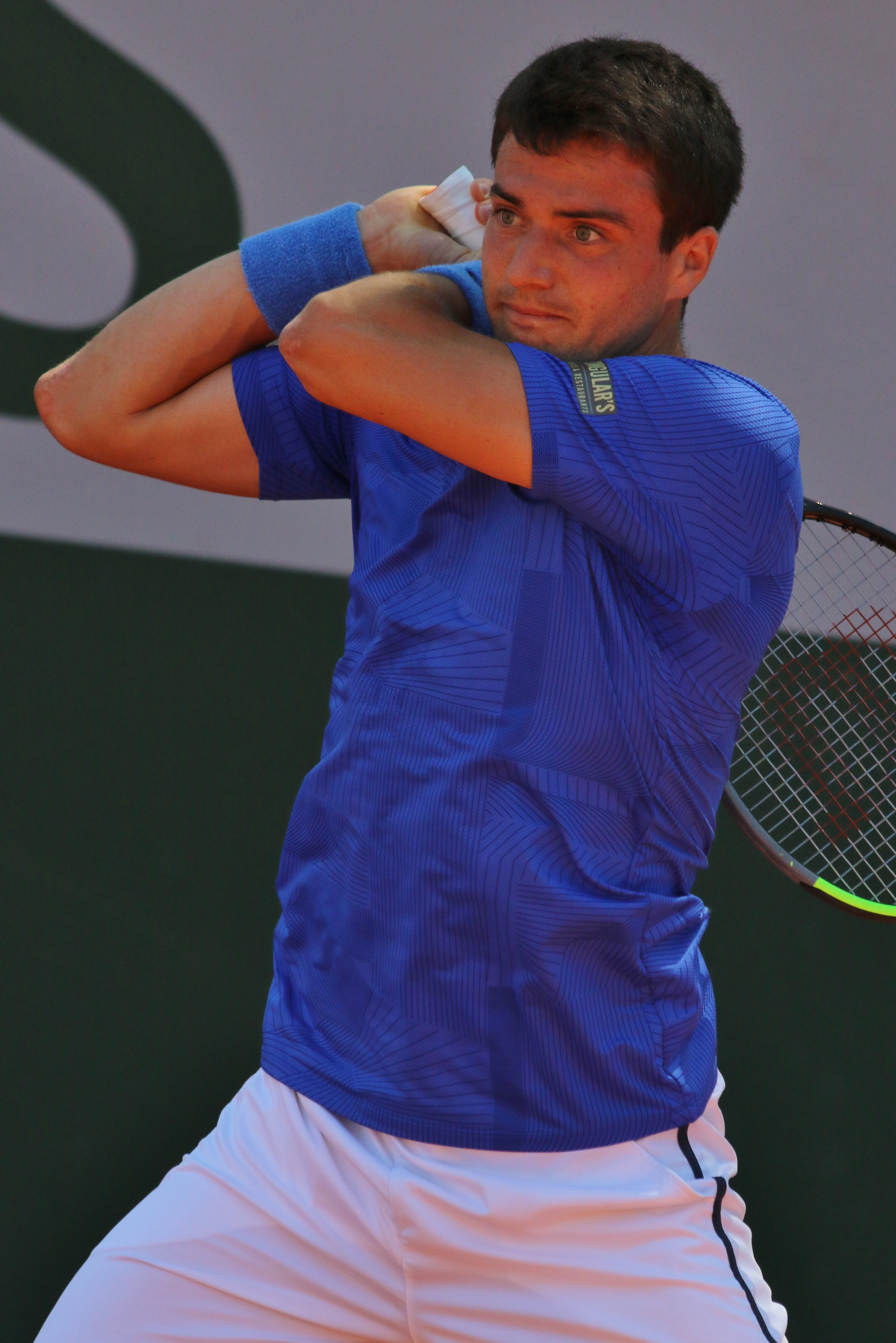
Martínez at the 2021 French Open

Martínez reached the third round of the 2021 Australian Open in singles for the first time at this Major, defeating Emil Ruusuvuori, his second showing at this level in his career.

At the 2021 French Open he reached the semifinals as alternate in doubles with fellow Spaniard Pablo Andujar, with whom he also made his Grand Slam doubles debut as a pair at the 2021 Australian Open. They defeated the 14th seeded Belgians Sander Gillé/Joran Vliegen in the third round and the pair of Rohan Bopanna/Franko Škugor in the quarterfinals. They entered the tournament as a replacement alternate pair for the top seeds Nikola Mektić/Mate Pavić. As a result, Martínez made his top 100 debut in doubles at world No. 95 on 14 June 2021. During the grass season, Martínez reached the third round of the 2021 Wimbledon Championships in singles for the first time in his career, defeating 13th seed Gael Monfils, his third showing in the third round of a Major.

Martínez reached his first ATP final at the 2021 Generali Open Kitzbühel where he was defeated by Casper Ruud. He secured the biggest win of his career when he overcame world No. 16 Roberto Bautista Agut en route to the championship match. He also reached the semifinals at the same tournament partnering Marc Polmans. As a result he reached a new career-high singles ranking of world No. 76 and a doubles ranking of No. 88 on 2 August 2021.

At the 2021 US Open he recorded his first win at this Major over James Duckworth to reach the second round. After winning the Challenger in Seville, he reached a career high ranking of world No. 59 on 13 September 2021. At the 2021 Kremlin Cup he was defeated by Marin Čilić in only the second quarterfinal of the season and third in his career at ATP level. He reached a career-high singles ranking of No. 58 on 25 October 2021. At the same tournament, he also reached the semifinals partnering Ilya Ivashka. As a result he returned to a doubles ranking of No. 87 on 25 October 2021 tied with his best ranking thus far.

=== 2022: ATP Cup finalist, ATP singles & doubles titles, Top 40 in singles ===
Martínez participated for the first time in the 2022 ATP Cup as part of the Spanish team where he played doubles with Alejandro Davidovich Fokina (won both matches) and Albert Ramos Vinolas (lost both matches) and helped Spain reach the final. Martínez reached the third round of the 2022 Australian Open in doubles for the first time at this Major partnering compatriot Pablo Andujar. As a result he reached a new career-high doubles ranking of World No. 72 on 31 January 2022.

Martinez was seeded fourth in Santiago. After receiving a first round bye, he defeated Jaume Munar, Yannick Hanfmann and Alejandro Tabilo to reach his second ATP final. He beat Sebastián Báez in the final to win his first ATP title. As a result he made his top 50 debut on 28 February 2022. He reached the third round of a Masters 1000 for the first time in his career at the 2022 Miami Open defeating Jan-Lennard Struff and upset 27th seed Cristian Garín. He made his top 40 debut following the 2022 Mutua Madrid Open on 9 May 2022.

At the 2022 Rakuten Japan Open Tennis Championships he reached the quarterfinals for a second time at an ATP 500 tour-level, defeating Alexei Popyrin and Jaume Munar.

=== 2023: Loss of form ===
As a result of a couple of first round losses in the beginning of the season, his ranking fell outside the top 100 after the 2023 Rio Open and as low as No. 120 after the 2023 Chile Open for not being able to defend his title in Santiago. Ranked No. 142, at the 2023 Italian Open he qualified for the main draw but lost in the first round to Alexander Bublik. At the 2023 French Open he again qualified for the main draw defeating Facundo Bagnis in the last of round qualifying, but lost to Tallon Griekspoor in the first round.

=== 2024–2026: Career-high ranking, First top 10 win & final since 2022 ===
Martínez returned to the top 100 at No. 99 on 29 January 2024 following a Challenger final in Tenerife, Spain. At the 2024 Chile Open in Santiago, he reached the semifinals defeating wildcard Francesco Passaro, sixth seed Facundo Diaz Acosta and third seed Arthur Fils.

At the 2024 Estoril Open he reached his fourth career ATP semifinal defeating Daniel Altmaier compatriot Roberto Bautista Agut and lucky loser Richard Gasquet. He defeated top seed and defending champion Casper Ruud for his first top 10 win, reaching his first final since 2022. As a result he returned to the top 60 in the rankings. He lost to second seed Hubert Hurkacz in straight sets.

He reached his second clay semifinal at the ATP 500 2024 Hamburg Open defeating fourth seed Matteo Arnaldi, qualifier Ugo Blanchet and fourth seed Francisco Cerúndolo before losing to top seed and defending champion Alexander Zverev.

== Personal life ==
In November 2023, Martínez and his girlfriend Claudia Espejo welcomed their first child, a boy.

== Performance timelines ==
Key
W	F	SF	QF	#R	RR	Q#	P#	DNQ	A	Z#	PO	G	S	B	NMS	NTI	P	NH

(W) winner; (F) finalist; (SF) semifinalist; (QF) quarterfinalist; (#R) rounds 4, 3, 2, 1; (RR) round-robin stage; (Q#) qualification round; (P#) preliminary round; (DNQ) did not qualify; (A) absent; (Z#) Davis/Fed Cup Zonal Group (with number indication) or (PO) play-off; (G) gold, (S) silver or (B) bronze Olympic/Paralympic medal; (NMS) not a Masters tournament; (NTI) not a Tier I tournament; (P) postponed; (NH) not held; (SR) strike rate (events won / competed); (W–L) win–loss record.
To avoid confusion and double counting, these charts are updated at the conclusion of a tournament or when the player's participation has ended.

=== Singles ===
Tournament	2018	2019	2020	2021	2022	2023	2024	2025	2026	SR	W–L
Grand Slam tournaments
Australian Open	A	Q3	2R	3R	2R	1R	Q1	2R	1R	0 / 6	5–6
French Open	Q1	1R	3R	2R	1R	1R	2R	1R	Q3	0 / 7	4–7
Wimbledon	A	Q2	NH	3R	1R	Q1	1R	3R	Q1	0 / 4	4–4
US Open	Q3	Q3	1R	2R	1R	Q1	2R	1R	Q1	0 / 5	2–5
Win–loss	0–0	0–1	3–3	6–4	1–4	0–2	2–3	3–4	0–1	0 / 22	15–22
ATP Masters 1000
Indian Wells Open	A	A	NH	2R	2R	2R	A	1R	A	0 / 4	3–4
Miami Open	A	A	NH	1R	3R	1R	Q2	1R	A	0 / 4	2–4
Monte-Carlo Masters	A	A	NH	1R	2R	Q1	A	2R	Q2	0 / 3	2–3
Madrid Open	A	A	NH	1R	1R	Q1	Q1	1R	Q1	0 / 3	0–3
Italian Open	A	A	2R	A	1R	1R	1R	2R	Q1	0 / 5	2–5
Canadian Open	A	A	NH	A	1R	A	1R	1R		0 / 3	0–3
Cincinnati Open	A	A	Q2	A	Q1	A	Q1	2R		0 / 1	1–1
Shanghai Masters	A	A	NH			A	1R	1R		0 / 2	0–2
Paris Masters	A	A	A	Q1	Q1	A	1R	Q1		0 / 1	0–1
Win–loss	0–0	0–0	1–1	1–4	4–6	1–3	0–4	3–8	0–0	0 / 26	10–26
Career statistics
Tournaments	2	2	8	19	26	12	22	27	9	127	
Titles	0	0	0	0	1	0	0	0	0	1	
Finals	0	0	0	1	1	0	1	0	0	3	
Overall win–loss	0–2	0–2	9–8	17–19	20–25	4–12	18–23	16–27	3–9	87–127	
Year-end ranking	156	170	85	60	62	114	43	95		$6,099,157	

=== Doubles ===
Tournament	2020	2021	2022	2023	2024	2025	2026	W–L
Australian Open	A	1R	3R	1R	A	3R	2R	5–5
French Open	1R	SF	1R	A	1R	1R	A	4–5
Wimbledon	NH	1R	2R	A	2R	2R	A	3–4
US Open	A	1R	1R	A	1R	1R	A	0–4
Win–loss	0–1	4–4	3–4	0–1	1–3	3–4	1–1	12–18

== ATP Tour finals ==
=== Singles: 3 (1 title, 2 runner-ups) ===
Legend Grand Slam (0–0) ATP Masters 1000 (0–0) ATP 500 (0–0) ATP 250 (1–2)	Finals by surface Hard (0–0) Clay (1–2) Grass (0–0)	Finals by setting Outdoor (1–2) Indoor (0–0)

Result	W–L	Date	Tournament	Tier	Surface	Opponent	Score
Loss	0–1	Jul 2021	Kitzbühel Open, Austria	ATP 250	Clay	(Norway) Casper Ruud	1–6, 6–4, 3–6
Win	1–1	Feb 2022	Chile Open, Chile	ATP 250	Clay	(Argentina) Sebastián Báez	4–6, 6–4, 6–4
Loss	1–2	Apr 2024	Estoril Open, Portugal	ATP 250	Clay	(Poland) Hubert Hurkacz	3–6, 4–6

=== Doubles: 2 (1 title, 1 runner-up) ===
Legend Grand Slam (0–0) ATP Masters 1000 (0–0) ATP 500 (0–1) ATP 250 (1–0)	Finals by surface Hard (0–0) Clay (1–1) Grass (0–0)	Finals by setting Outdoor (1–1) Indoor (0–0)

Result	W–L	Date	Tournament	Tier	Surface	Partner	Opponents	Score
Win	1–0	Jul 2022	Austrian Open Kitzbühel, Austria	ATP 250	Clay	(Italy) Lorenzo Sonego	(Germany) Tim Pütz (New Zealand) Michael Venus	5–7, 6–4, [10–8]
Loss	1–1	Feb 2025	Rio Open, Brazil	ATP 500	Clay	(Spain) Jaume Munar	(Brazil) Rafael Matos (Brazil) Marcelo Melo	2–6, 5–7

== ATP Challenger Tour finals ==
=== Singles: 16 (8 titles, 8 runner-ups) ===
Legend ATP Challenger Tour (8–8)	Finals by surface Hard (2–2) Clay (6–6)

Result	W–L	Date	Tournament	Tier	Surface	Opponent	Score
Win	1–0	Jul 2018	Båstad, Sweden	Challenger	Clay	(France) Corentin Moutet	7–6^{(5)}, 6–4
Loss	1–1	Oct 2018	Barcelona, Spain	Challenger	Clay	(Spain) Roberto Carballés Baena	6–1, 3–6, 0–6
Loss	1–2	Apr 2019	Alicante, Spain	Challenger	Clay	(Spain) Pablo Andújar	3–6, 6–3, 4–6
Loss	1–3	Oct 2020	Alicante, Spain	Challenger	Clay	(Spain) Carlos Alcaraz	6–7^{(6)}, 3–6
Win	2–3	Nov 2020	Marbella, Spain	Challenger	Clay	(Spain) Jaume Munar	7–6^{(4)}, 6–2
Win	3–3	Sep 2021	Seville, Spain	Challenger	Clay	(Spain) Roberto Carballés Baena	6–4, 6–1
Loss	3–4	Sep 2023	Como, Italy	Challenger	Clay	(Brazil) Thiago Seyboth Wild	7–5, 2–6, 3–6
Win	4–4	Oct 2023	Brest, France	Challenger	Hard (i)	(France) Benjamin Bonzi	7–6^{(8–6)}, 7–6^{(7–1)}
Win	5–4	Dec 2023	Maspalomas, Spain	Challenger	Clay	(Switzerland) Kilian Feldbausch	6–4, 4–6, 6–3
Loss	5–5	Jan 2024	Tenerife, Spain	Challenger	Hard	(United States) Brandon Nakashima	3–6, 4–6
Win	6–5	Mar 2024	Girona, Spain	Challenger	Clay	(Moldova) Radu Albot	7–5, 6–4
Loss	6–6	May 2024	Bordeaux, France	Challenger	Clay	(France) Arthur Fils	2–6, 3–6
Win	7–6	Oct 2024	Valencia, Spain	Challenger	Clay	(Portugal) Jaime Faria	6–1, 6–3
Win	8–6	Jan 2026	Bengaluru, India	Challenger	Hard	(Kazakhstan) Timofey Skatov	7–6^{(7–5)}, 6–3
Loss	8–7	Aug 2026	Kingston, Jamaica	Challenger	Hard	(France) Valentin Royer	4–6, 2–6
Loss	8–8	Sep 2026	Genoa, Italy	Challenger	Clay	(Brazil) Thiago Seyboth Wild	4–6, 2–6

=== Doubles: 12 (4 titles, 8 runner-ups) ===
Legend ATP Challenger Tour (4–8)	Finals by surface Hard (0–3) Clay (4–5)

Result	W–L	Date	Tournament	Tier	Surface	Partner	Opponents	Score
Loss	0–1	Sep 2016	Meknes, Morocco	Challenger	Clay	(Spain) Oriol Roca Batalla	(Switzerland) Luca Margaroli (Egypt) Mohamed Safwat	4–6, 4–6
Loss	0–2	Nov 2017	Pune, India	Challenger	Hard	(Spain) Adrián Menéndez Maceiras	(Bosnia and Herzegovina) Tomislav Brkić (Croatia) Ante Pavić	1–6, 6–7^{(5)}
Loss	0–3	Jan 2018	Bangkok II, Thailand	Challenger	Hard	(Spain) Enrique López Pérez	(United States) James Cerretani (United Kingdom) Joe Salisbury	7–6^{(5)}, 3–6, [8–10]
Loss	0–4	Jun 2018	L’Aquila, Italy	Challenger	Clay	(Netherlands) Mark Vervoort	(Italy) Filippo Baldi (Italy) Andrea Pellegrino	6–4, 3–6, [5–10]
Win	1–4	Sep 2018	Seville, Spain	Challenger	Clay	(Spain) Gerard Granollers	(Spain) Daniel Gimeno Traver (Spain) Ricardo Ojeda Lara	6–0, 6–2
Loss	1–5	Sep 2018	Tiburon, USA	Challenger	Hard	(Spain) Gerard Granollers	(Mexico) Hans Hach Verdugo (Australia) Luke Saville	3–6, 2–6
Loss	1–6	Apr 2019	Alicante, Spain	Challenger	Clay	(Spain) Gerard Granollers	(Brazil) Thomaz Bellucci (Argentina) Guillermo Durán	6–2, 5–7, [5–10]
Loss	1–7	Jun 2019	Poznań, Poland	Challenger	Clay	(Netherlands) Mark Vervoort	(Italy) Andrea Vavassori (Spain) David Vega Hernández	4–6, 7–6^{(4)}, [6–10]
Win	2–7	Sep 2019	Seville, Spain	Challenger	Clay	(Spain) Gerard Granollers	(Belgium) Kimmer Coppejans (Spain) Sergio Martos Gornés	7–5, 6–4
Loss	2–8	Sep 2019	Florence, Italy	Challenger	Clay	(Spain) Gerard Granollers	(Switzerland) Luca Margaroli (Canada) Adil Shamasdin	5–7, 7–6^{(6)}, [12–14]
Win	3–8	Nov 2020	Marbella, Spain	Challenger	Clay	(Spain) Gerard Granollers	(Venezuela) Luis David Martínez (Brazil) Fernando Romboli	6–3, 6–4
Win	4–8	Sep 2023	Seville, Spain	Challenger	Clay	(Spain) Alberto Barroso Campos	(Brazil) Fernando Romboli (India) Sriram Balaji	3–6, 7–6^{(5)}, [11–9]

== ITF Futures finals ==
=== Singles: 14 (8 titles, 6 runner-ups) ===
Legend ITF Futures (8–6)	Finals by surface Hard (1–0) Clay (7–6) Grass (0–0) Carpet (0–0)

Result	W–L	Date	Tournament	Tier	Surface	Opponent	Score
Loss	0–1	Jun 2015	France F11, Toulon	Futures	Clay	(France) Alexis Musialek	6–1, 2–6, 3–6
Loss	0–2	Jul 2015	Spain F20, Getxo	Futures	Clay	(United Kingdom) Alexander Ward	1–6, 1–6
Win	1–2	Mar 2016	Croatia F3, Pula	Futures	Clay	(Czech Republic) Zdeněk Kolář	6–3, 6–1
Loss	1–3	May 2016	Tunisia F16, Hammamet	Futures	Clay	(Belgium) Omar Salman	6–2, 5–7 ret.
Win	2–3	Jun 2016	Bulgaria F3, Stara Zagora	Futures	Clay	(Belgium) Germain Gigounon	6–3, 6–1
Win	3–3	Jun 2016	Bulgaria F4, Plovdiv	Futures	Clay	(Bulgaria) Dimitar Kuzmanov	7–6^{(5)}, 6–2
Loss	3–4	Jul 2016	Spain F20, Getxo	Futures	Clay	(Spain) Ricardo Ojeda Lara	1–6, 4–6
Win	4–4	Jul 2016	Spain F23, Xàtiva	Futures	Clay	(Spain) Carlos Taberner	2–6, 6–1, 6–4
Loss	4–5	Feb 2017	Spain F3, Peguera	Futures	Clay	(Italy) Stefano Travaglia	5–7, 1–6
Win	5–5	Apr 2017	Tunisia F16, Hammamet	Futures	Clay	(Morocco) Lamine Ouahab	6–3, 6–3
Win	6–5	May 2017	Spain F12, Lleida	Futures	Clay	(Spain) Gerard Granollers	6–3, 5–7, 6–4
Win	7–5	Aug 2017	Spain F26, Santander	Futures	Clay	(Spain) Marc Giner	6–3, 6–2
Win	8–5	Feb 2018	Egypt F3, Sharm El Sheikh	Futures	Hard	(Ukraine) Vladyslav Manafov	3–6, 6–3, 6–2
Loss	8–6	Jun 2018	Spain F14, Huelva	Futures	Clay	(Spain) Sergio Gutiérrez Ferrol	6–3, 6–7^{(1)}, 2–6

=== Doubles: 26 (18 titles, 8 runner-ups) ===
Legend ITF Futures (18–8)	Finals by surface Hard (2–0) Clay (16–8) Grass (0–0) Carpet (0–0)

Result	W–L	Date	Tournament	Tier	Surface	Partner	Opponents	Score
Win	1–0	Feb 2014	Spain F1, Peguera	Futures	Clay	(Spain) Jaume Munar	(Spain) Roberto Carballés Baena (Spain) Oriol Roca Batalla	6–1, 6–1
Win	2–0	Sep 2014	Spain F26, Madrid	Futures	Hard	(Spain) Jaume Munar	(Spain) Adam Sanjurjo Hermida (Spain) Miguel Semmler	6–3, 6–4
Win	3–0	Jul 2015	Spain F20, Getxo	Futures	Clay	(Spain) Eduard Esteve Lobato	(Russia) Alexander Igoshin (Russia) Ivan Gakhov	6–1, 6–2
Win	4–0	Jul 2015	Spain F21, Gandia	Futures	Clay	(Spain) Eduard Esteve Lobato	(Spain) Carlos Boluda-Purkiss (Spain) Alberto Romero de Ávila Senise	6–1, 6–2
Loss	4–1	Aug 2015	Spain F26, Vigo	Futures	Clay	(Spain) Eduard Esteve Lobato	(Spain) Sergio Martos Gornés (Spain) Pol Toledo Bagué	4–6, 3–6
Win	5–1	Sep 2015	Spain F28, Oviedo	Futures	Clay	(Spain) Gerard Granollers	(France) Adrien Puget (France) Xavier Pujo	7–5, 6–4
Loss	5–2	Mar 2016	Croatia F3, Pula	Futures	Clay	(Spain) Jaume Munar	(Poland) Paweł Ciaś (Poland) Grzegorz Panfil	6–4, 3–6, [6–10]
Loss	5–3	May 2016	Tunisia F16, Hammamet	Futures	Clay	(Spain) Carlos Calderón Rodríguez	(United States) Catalin Gard (Germany) Andreas Mies	6–7^{(3)}, 6–7^{(1)}
Loss	5–4	May 2016	Spain F13, Valldoreix	Futures	Clay	(Spain) Carlos Calderón Rodríguez	(Spain) Jaume Munar (Spain) Álvaro López San Martín	3–6, 6–3, [5–10]
Loss	5–5	Jun 2016	Bulgaria F3, Stara Zagora	Futures	Clay	(Spain) Carlos Calderón Rodríguez	(Russia) Yan Sabanin (Bulgaria) Vasko Mladenov	2–6, 6–7^{(2)}
Win	6–5	Jun 2016	France F11, Toulon	Futures	Clay	(Morocco) Lamine Ouahab	(France) Ronan Joncour (France) Yanais Laurent	6–3, 6–7^{(4)}, [12–10]
Loss	6–6	Jul 2016	France F12, Montauban	Futures	Clay	(Morocco) Lamine Ouahab	(Bosnia and Herzegovina) Tomislav Brkić (Brazil) Caio Zampieri	1–6, 2–6
Win	7–6	Jul 2016	Spain F23, Xàtiva	Futures	Clay	(Spain) Alberto Barroso Campos	(Spain) Francesc Aulina (Spain) Juan Lizariturry	6–4, 6–1
Win	8–6	Sep 2016	Spain F28, San Sebastián	Futures	Clay	(Spain) Eduard Esteve Lobato	(France) Maxime Mora (Benin) Alexis Klégou	6–3, 3–6, [10–4]
Win	9–6	Jan 2017	Spain F1, Manacor	Futures	Clay	(Spain) Ricardo Ojeda Lara	(Spain) Sergio Martos Gornés (Spain) David Vega Hernández	6–7^{(5)}, 6–0, [10–4]
Win	10–6	Feb 2017	Spain F3, Peguera	Futures	Clay	(Spain) Gerard Granollers	(Italy) Filippo Leonardi (Italy) Stefano Travaglia	6–7^{(5)}, 6–0, [10–4]
Win	11–6	Feb 2017	Spain F4, Peguera	Futures	Clay	(Spain) Gerard Granollers	(Spain) Sergio Martos Gornés (Chile) Cristóbal Saavedra Corvalán	6–3, 6–4
Loss	11–7	Feb 2017	Spain F5, Murcia	Futures	Clay	(Spain) Oriol Roca Batalla	(Russia) Ivan Gakhov (Spain) David Vega Hernández	7–5, 3–6, [8–10]
Win	12–7	Mar 2017	Spain F7, Xàbia	Futures	Clay	(Spain) Gerard Granollers	(Russia) Ivan Gakhov (Spain) Sergio Martos Gornés	6–2, 6–2
Loss	12–8	May 2017	Spain F13, Valldoreix	Futures	Clay	(Spain) David Vega Hernández	(Brazil) Igor Marcondes (Brazil) Rafael Matos	7–6^{(4)}, 6–7^{(6)}, [10–12]
Win	13–8	Jul 2017	Spain F21, Gandia	Futures	Clay	(Spain) Marc Giner	(Russia) Ivan Gakhov (Spain) Sergio Martos Gornés	7–6^{(4)}, 6–3
Win	14–8	Jul 2017	Spain F22, Dénia	Futures	Clay	(Russia) Ivan Gakhov	(Spain) Juan Lizariturry (Spain) Jaume Pla Malfeito	7–5, 6–7^{(7)}, [11–9]
Win	15–8	Sep 2017	Spain F29, Seville	Futures	Clay	(Spain) David Vega Hernández	(Spain) Marc Giner (Spain) Jaume Pla Malfeito	3–6, 6–4, [10–5]
Win	16–8	Sep 2017	Spain F30, Madrid	Futures	Clay (i)	(Spain) Miguel Semmler	(Belgium) Christopher Heyman (Belgium) Yannick Vandenbulcke	6–4, 6–4
Win	17–8	Feb 2018	Egypt F3, Sharm El Sheikh	Futures	Hard	(Belgium) Omar Salman	(France) Maxence Brovillé (France) Johan Sébastien Tatlot	6–4, 6–7^{(5)}, [10–5]
Win	18–8	Mar 2018	Spain F6, Xàbia	Futures	Clay	(Belgium) Germain Gigounon	(Russia) Ivan Gakhov (Belgium) Kimmer Coppejans	7–6^{(4)}, 7–6^{(1)}

== Record against top 10 players ==
- Martínez has a 1–12 win-loss record against players who were, at the time the match was played, ranked in the top 10.

=== Wins over top 10 players ===
Season	2024	Total
Wins	1	1

#	Player	Rank	Event	Surface	Rd	Score	PMR
2024
1.	(Norway) Casper Ruud	8	Estoril Open, Portugal	Clay	SF	6–4, 4–6, 6–4	77

*As of 7 February 2025
