= 2023 Copa Faulcombridge – Singles =

Singles
- 2023 Copa Faulcombridge

Final
- Champion: (Italy) Fabio Fognini
- Runner-up: (Spain) Roberto Bautista Agut
- Score: 3–6, 7–6^{(10–8)}, 7–6^{(7–3)}

Events
Singles	Doubles
- Copa Faulcombridge

Fabio Fognini won the title after defeating Roberto Bautista Agut 3–6, 7–6^{(10–8)}, 7–6^{(7–3)} in the final. He saved two championship points in the second set. This was the fifth final in ATP Challenger history to feature two former Top 10 ranked players and the first one since the 2006 Montevideo final between Guillermo Cañas and Nicolás Lapentti. Fognini was the oldest champion for the season and the two players combined for the oldest Challenger final in 2023.

Oleksii Krutykh was the defending champion but lost in the first round to Adrian Andreev.

== Seeds ==
1. (Spain) Roberto Bautista Agut (final)
2. (Spain) Bernabé Zapata Miralles (withdrew)
3. (Spain) Albert Ramos Viñolas (semifinals)
4. (Germany) Maximilian Marterer (withdrew)
5. (France) Hugo Gaston (quarterfinals)
6. (Slovakia) Alex Molčan (first round)
7. (Spain) Pedro Martínez (second round, withdrew)
8. (Italy) Fabio Fognini (champion)

== Draw ==
Key

- Q = Qualifier
- WC = Wild card
- LL = Lucky loser
- Alt = Alternate
- ITF = ITF entry
- PR = Protected ranking
- SR = Special ranking
- SE = Special exempt
- JE = Junior exempt
- JR = Junior Accelerator Programme entrant
- CO = College Accelerator Programme entrant
- NG = Next Gen Accelerator Program entrant
- w/o = Walkover
- r = Retired
- d = Defaulted

=== Finals ===
Semifinals
1	(Spain) Roberto Bautista Agut	6	6
Q	(Kazakhstan) Denis Yevseyev	3	1
3	(Spain) Albert Ramos Viñolas	4	1
8	(Italy) Fabio Fognini	6	6

Final
1	(Spain) Roberto Bautista Agut	6	6^{8}	6^{3}
8	(Italy) Fabio Fognini	3	7^{10}	7^{7}

=== Top half ===
First round
1	(Spain) R Bautista Agut	6	6
(Italy) A Vavassori	3	4
I Gakhov	3	1
(Italy) A Pellegrino	6	6
(India) S Nagal	4	3
LL	(Spain) A Moro Cañas	6	6
(Germany) R Molleker	6	7
6	(Slovakia) A Molčan	4	5
Q	(Spain) Carlos López Montagud	5	4
(Spain) D Rincón	7	6
WC	(Spain) M Landaluce	6	6
WC	(Spain) P Andújar	3	2
Q	(Kazakhstan) D Yevseyev	7	7^{7}
WC	(Spain) C Taberner	5	6^{2}
(Sweden) E Ymer	1	6	1
7	(Spain) P Martínez	6	3	6

Second round
1	(Spain) R Bautista Agut	7	6
(Italy) A Pellegrino	5	3
LL	(Spain) A Moro Cañas	6	6
(Germany) R Molleker	4	4
(Spain) D Rincón	4	4
WC	(Spain) M Landaluce	6	6
Q	(Kazakhstan) D Yevseyev	w/o
7	(Spain) P Martínez

Quarterfinals
1	(Spain) R Bautista Agut	6	7
LL	(Spain) A Moro Cañas	2	5
WC	(Spain) M Landaluce	6^{6}	6^{2}
Q	(Kazakhstan) D Yevseyev	7^{8}	7^{7}

Semifinals
1	(Spain) R Bautista Agut	6	6
Q	(Kazakhstan) D Yevseyev	3	1

=== Bottom half ===
First round
5	(France) H Gaston	6	6
(France) H Mayot	1	1
LL	(Italy) S Caruso	1	4
(Italy) R Brancaccio	6	6
(Italy) A Giannessi	6	6
Q	(Spain) M Damas	2	4
Alt	(Argentina) M Trungelliti	2	6^{11}
3	(Spain) A Ramos Viñolas	6	7^{13}
8	(Italy) F Fognini	2	7	6
(Italy) R Bonadio	6	5	1
(Spain) O Roca Batalla	7^{7}	3	6^{4}
Alt	(Slovakia) J Kovalík	6^{4}	6	7^{7}
Q	(France) P-H Herbert	3	6	6
(France) C Moutet	6	4	1
Q	(Bulgaria) A Andreev	2	6	7^{7}
Q	(Ukraine) O Krutykh	6	2	6^{5}

Second round
5	(France) H Gaston	6	7^{7}
(Italy) R Brancaccio	4	6^{5}
(Italy) A Giannessi	1	6	6^{3}
3	(Spain) A Ramos Viñolas	6	0	7^{7}
8	(Italy) F Fognini	6	4	6
Alt	(Slovakia) J Kovalík	1	6	3
Q	(France) P-H Herbert	6	6
Q	(Bulgaria) A Andreev	1	2

Quarterfinals
5	(France) H Gaston	2	4
3	(Spain) A Ramos Viñolas	6	6
8	(Italy) F Fognini	6	7
Q	(France) P-H Herbert	4	5

Semifinals
3	(Spain) A Ramos Viñolas	4	1
8	(Italy) F Fognini	6	6
