= 2023 Copa Faulcombridge – Doubles =

Doubles
- 2023 Copa Faulcombridge

Final
- Champions: (Italy) Andrea Pellegrino (Italy) Andrea Vavassori
- Runners-up: (Spain) Daniel Rincón (Spain) Oriol Roca Batalla
- Score: 6–2, 6–4

Events
Singles	Doubles
- Copa Faulcombridge

Oleksii Krutykh and Oriol Roca Batalla were the defending champions but chose to defend their title with different partners. Krutykh partnered Sumit Nagal but lost in the first round to Marco Bortolotti and Alexandru Jecan. Roca Batalla partnered Daniel Rincón but lost in the final to Andrea Pellegrino and Andrea Vavassori.

Pellegrino and Vavassori won the title after defeating Rincón and Roca Batalla 6–2, 6–4 in the final.

== Seeds ==
1. (Italy) Andrea Pellegrino / (Italy) Andrea Vavassori (champions)
2. (Romania) Victor Vlad Cornea / (Austria) Philipp Oswald (semifinals)
3. (India) Jeevan Nedunchezhiyan / (India) Vijay Sundar Prashanth (semifinals)
4. (India) Anirudh Chandrasekar / Ivan Liutarevich (quarterfinals)

== Draw ==
Key

- Q = Qualifier
- WC = Wild card
- LL = Lucky loser
- Alt = Alternate
- ITF = ITF entry
- PR = Protected ranking
- SR = Special ranking
- SE = Special exempt
- JE = Junior exempt
- JR = Junior Accelerator Programme entrant
- CO = College Accelerator Programme entrant
- NG = Next Gen Accelerator Program entrant
- w/o = Walkover
- r = Retired
- d = Defaulted

First round
1	(Italy) A Pellegrino (Italy) A Vavassori	6	1	[10]
(Spain) Í Cervantes (Spain) D Vega Hernández	4	6	[7]
(Spain) S Martos Gornés (Netherlands) S Verbeek	6	6
Alt	(Spain) N Sánchez Izquierdo (Ukraine) V Uzhylovskyi	2	4
3	(India) J Nedunchezhiyan (India) VS Prashanth	6	7^{7}
(Italy) R Bonadio (Italy) A Giannessi	3	6^{5}
I Gakhov (Kazakhstan) D Yevseyev	6^{5}	6^{1}
(United Kingdom) S Duncan (Canada) K Stevenson	7^{7}	7^{7}
(Spain) D Rincón (Spain) O Roca Batalla	6	6
WC	(Spain) J Barranco Cosano (Spain) Carlos López Montagud	4	2
Alt	(Belgium) M Geerts (United Kingdom) J Paris	3	1
4	(India) A Chandrasekar; I Liutarevich	6	6
(Italy) M Bortolotti (Romania) A Jecan	3	6	[10]
(Ukraine) O Krutykh (India) S Nagal	6	4	[8]
WC	(Spain) Carles Córdoba (Venezuela) Ignacio Parisca Romera	1	3
2	(Romania) VV Cornea (Austria) P Oswald	6	6

Quarterfinals
1	(Italy) A Pellegrino (Italy) A Vavassori	6	6
(Spain) S Martos Gornés (Netherlands) S Verbeek	4	3
3	(India) J Nedunchezhiyan (India) VS Prashanth	6	6
(United Kingdom) S Duncan (Canada) K Stevenson	2	2
(Spain) D Rincón (Spain) O Roca Batalla	7^{8}	2	[10]
4	(India) A Chandrasekar; I Liutarevich	6^{6}	6	[2]
(Italy) M Bortolotti (Romania) A Jecan	6^{6}	5
2	(Romania) VV Cornea (Austria) P Oswald	7^{8}	7

Semifinals
1	(Italy) A Pellegrino (Italy) A Vavassori	6	6
3	(India) J Nedunchezhiyan (India) VS Prashanth	4	4
(Spain) D Rincón (Spain) O Roca Batalla	5	6	[10]
2	(Romania) VV Cornea (Austria) P Oswald	7	1	[3]

Final
1	(Italy) A Pellegrino (Italy) A Vavassori	6	6
(Spain) D Rincón (Spain) O Roca Batalla	2	4
