= 2025 Copa Faulcombridge – Singles =

Singles
- 2025 Copa Faulcombridge

Final
- Champion: (United Kingdom) Jan Choinski
- Runner-up: (Croatia) Luka Mikrut
- Score: 4–6, 6–1, 6–2

Events
Singles	Doubles
- Copa Faulcombridge

Pedro Martínez was the defending champion but lost in the first round to Albert Ramos Viñolas.

Jan Choinski won the title after defeating Luka Mikrut 4–6, 6–1, 6–2 in the final.

This marked the final appearance of former world No. 17 Ramos Viñolas, who lost in the quarterfinals to Choinski.

== Seeds ==
1. (Spain) Pedro Martínez (first round)
2. (Czech Republic) Vít Kopřiva (first round)
3. (Spain) Carlos Taberner (semifinals)
4. (Peru) Ignacio Buse (first round)
5. (Denmark) Elmer Møller (first round)
6. (Serbia) Dušan Lajović (second round)
7. (Colombia) Daniel Elahi Galán (withdrew)
8. (Italy) Andrea Pellegrino (withdrew)
9. (Argentina) Marco Trungelliti (quarterfinals)
10. (Lithuania) Vilius Gaubas (first round)

== Draw ==
Key

- Q = Qualifier
- WC = Wild card
- LL = Lucky loser
- Alt = Alternate
- ITF = ITF entry
- PR = Protected ranking
- SR = Special ranking
- SE = Special exempt
- JE = Junior exempt
- JR = Junior Accelerator Programme entrant
- CO = College Accelerator Programme entrant
- NG = Next Gen Accelerator Program entrant
- w/o = Walkover
- r = Retired
- d = Defaulted

=== Finals ===
Semifinals
(United Kingdom) Jan Choinski	6^{2}	7	7
Q	(Germany) Henri Squire	7^{7}	5	5
3	(Spain) Carlos Taberner	6^{10}	0
(Croatia) Luka Mikrut	7^{12}	6

Final
(United Kingdom) Jan Choinski	4	6	6
(Croatia) Luka Mikrut	6	1	2

=== Top half ===
First round
1	(Spain) P Martínez	4	2
WC	(Spain) A Ramos Viñolas	6	6
Alt	(Czech Republic) Z Kolář	6	6
Q	(Spain) C Sánchez Jover	4	2
(United Kingdom) J Choinski	6^{2}	6	6
Q	(Spain) M Damas	7^{7}	3	3
Q	I Gakhov	6	4	6
10	(Lithuania) V Gaubas	2	6	3
4	(Peru) I Buse	4	4
(Spain) P Llamas Ruiz	6	6
Q	(India) S Nagal	6	6
(Spain) D Mérida	3	1
Q	(Germany) H Squire	6	6
(Spain) D Rincón	0	1
LL	(Portugal) T Pereira	4	1
6	(Serbia) D Lajović	6	6

Second round
WC	(Spain) A Ramos Viñolas	1	6	6
Alt	(Czech Republic) Z Kolář	6	3	4
(United Kingdom) J Choinski	4	6	6
Q	I Gakhov	6	3	4
(Spain) P Llamas Ruiz	3	6	3
Q	(India) S Nagal	6	3	6
Q	(Germany) H Squire	3	6	6
6	(Serbia) D Lajović	6	0	4

Quarterfinals
WC	(Spain) A Ramos Viñolas	4	5
(United Kingdom) J Choinski	6	7
Q	(India) S Nagal	6^{5}	4
Q	(Germany) H Squire	7^{7}	6

Semifinals
(United Kingdom) J Choinski	6^{2}	7	7
Q	(Germany) H Squire	7^{7}	5	5

=== Bottom half ===
First round
9	(Argentina) M Trungelliti	2	6	6
(Bosnia and Herzegovina) N Fatić	6	3	4
(Italy) S Travaglia	5	6	6^{5}
Alt	(Spain) P Martín Tiffon	7	1	7^{7}
WC	(Spain) B Zapata Miralles	6	1	1
(France) L Pavlovic	2	6	6
NG	(Germany) D Dedura	6	4	2^{r}
3	(Spain) C Taberner	3	6	4
5	(Denmark) E Møller	4	4
WC	(Spain) Carlos López Montagud	6	6
(Croatia) L Mikrut	4	6	6
(Spain) A Moro Cañas	6	2	3
(Romania) FC Jianu	6	3	6
Q	(Romania) C Crețu	1	6	4
LL	(Germany) C Negritu	6	6
2	(Czech Republic) V Kopřiva	4	2

Second round
9	(Argentina) M Trungelliti	6	0
Alt	(Spain) P Martín Tiffon	4	0^{r}
(France) L Pavlovic	2	3
3	(Spain) C Taberner	6	6
WC	(Spain) C López Montagud	3	1
(Croatia) L Mikrut	6	6
(Romania) FC Jianu	4	3
LL	(Germany) C Negritu	6	6

Quarterfinals
9	(Argentina) M Trungelliti	4	4
3	(Spain) C Taberner	6	6
(Croatia) L Mikrut	4	7^{7}	6
LL	(Germany) C Negritu	6	6^{4}	4

Semifinals
3	(Spain) C Taberner	6^{10}	0
(Croatia) L Mikrut	7^{12}	6
