= 2022 Copa Faulcombridge – Doubles =

Doubles
- 2022 Copa Faulcombridge

Final
- Champions: (Ukraine) Oleksii Krutykh (Spain) Oriol Roca Batalla
- Runners-up: (Serbia) Ivan Sabanov (Serbia) Matej Sabanov
- Score: 6–3, 7–6^{(7–3)}

Events
Singles	Doubles
- Copa Faulcombridge

This was the first edition of the tournament.

Oleksii Krutykh and Oriol Roca Batalla won the title after defeating Ivan and Matej Sabanov 6–3, 7–6^{(7–3)} in the final.

== Seeds ==
1. (Portugal) Nuno Borges / (Portugal) Francisco Cabral (first round)
2. (Serbia) Ivan Sabanov / (Serbia) Matej Sabanov (final)
3. (Italy) Marco Bortolotti / (Spain) Sergio Martos Gornés (first round)
4. (Finland) Patrik Niklas-Salminen / (Netherlands) Bart Stevens (first round)

== Draw ==
Key

- Q = Qualifier
- WC = Wild card
- LL = Lucky loser
- Alt = Alternate
- ITF = ITF entry
- PR = Protected ranking
- SR = Special ranking
- SE = Special exempt
- JE = Junior exempt
- JR = Junior Accelerator Programme entrant
- CO = College Accelerator Programme entrant
- NG = Next Gen Accelerator Program entrant
- w/o = Walkover
- r = Retired
- d = Defaulted

First round
1	(Portugal) N Borges (Portugal) F Cabral	5	6	[5]
(Serbia) N Milojević (Serbia) M Zekić	7	4	[10]
WC	(Spain) N Álvarez Varona (Spain) M Mansilla Díez	6	6
(United States) E King (United States) R Stalder	1	4
3	(Italy) M Bortolotti (Spain) S Martos Gornés	5	6^{5}
(Ukraine) O Krutykh (Spain) O Roca Batalla	7	7^{7}
Alt	(Belgium) K Coppejans (Italy) GM Moroni	w/o
(Italy) L Darderi (Spain) N Sánchez Izquierdo
(India) A Chandrasekar (India) VS Prashanth	4	6	[10]
Alt	(Italy) R Brancaccio (Spain) Carlos López Montagud	6	3	[3]
(Croatia) Z Babić (Poland) P Matuszewski	7^{11}	5	[10]
4	(Finland) P Niklas-Salminen (Netherlands) B Stevens	6^{9}	7	[8]
(France) T Arribagé (Greece) Pe Tsitsipas	6	7^{9}
(Italy) A Pellegrino (Italy) A Vavassori	3	6^{7}
(France) G Blancaneaux (Argentina) A Collarini	4	3
2	(Serbia) I Sabanov (Serbia) M Sabanov	6	6

Quarterfinals
(Serbia) N Milojević (Serbia) M Zekić	2^{r}
WC	(Spain) N Álvarez Varona (Spain) M Mansilla Díez	4
(Ukraine) O Krutykh (Spain) O Roca Batalla	7	4	[10]
Alt	(Belgium) K Coppejans (Italy) GM Moroni	5	6	[7]
(India) A Chandrasekar (India) VS Prashanth	6^{1}	4
(Croatia) Z Babić (Poland) P Matuszewski	7^{7}	6
(France) T Arribagé (Greece) Pe Tsitsipas	3	6	[11]
2	(Serbia) I Sabanov (Serbia) M Sabanov	6	4	[13]

Semifinals
WC	(Spain) N Álvarez Varona (Spain) M Mansilla Díez	4	4
(Ukraine) O Krutykh (Spain) O Roca Batalla	6	6
(Croatia) Z Babić (Poland) P Matuszewski	2	7^{8}	[9]
2	(Serbia) I Sabanov (Serbia) M Sabanov	6	6^{6}	[11]

Final
(Ukraine) O Krutykh (Spain) O Roca Batalla	6	7^{7}
2	(Serbia) I Sabanov (Serbia) M Sabanov	3	6^{3}
