= 2023 Copa Faulcombridge =

- Date: 20–26 November
- Edition: 2nd
- Surface: Clay
- Location: Valencia, Spain

Champions

Singles
- (Italy) Fabio Fognini

Doubles
- (Italy) Andrea Pellegrino / (Italy) Andrea Vavassori
- Copa Faulcombridge

The 2023 Copa Faulcombridge Ciudad de Valencia was a professional tennis tournament played on clay courts. It was the second edition of the tournament which was part of the 2023 ATP Challenger Tour. It took place in Valencia, Spain, between 20 and 26 November 2023.

== Singles main-draw entrants ==
=== Seeds ===
Country	Player	Rank^{1}	Seed
ESP	Roberto Bautista Agut	62	1
~~ESP~~	~~Bernabé Zapata Miralles~~	~~83~~	~~2~~
ESP	Albert Ramos Viñolas	94	3
~~GER~~	~~Maximilian Marterer~~	~~100~~	~~4~~
FRA	Hugo Gaston	101	5
SVK	Alex Molčan	114	6
ESP	Pedro Martínez	115	7
ITA	Fabio Fognini	129	8

- ^{1} Rankings are as of 13 November 2023.

=== Other entrants ===
The following players received wildcards into the singles main draw:

- (Spain) Pablo Andújar
- (Spain) Martín Landaluce
- (Spain) Daniel Rincón

The following players received entry into the singles main draw as alternates:

- (Slovakia) Jozef Kovalík
- (Argentina) Marco Trungelliti

The following players received entry from the qualifying draw:

- (Bulgaria) Adrian Andreev
- (Spain) Miguel Damas
- (France) Pierre-Hugues Herbert
- (Ukraine) Oleksii Krutykh
- (Spain) Carlos López Montagud
- (Kazakhstan) Denis Yevseyev

The following players received entry as lucky losers:

- (Italy) Salvatore Caruso
- (Spain) Alejandro Moro Cañas

== Champions ==
=== Singles ===
- (Italy) Fabio Fognini def. (Spain) Roberto Bautista Agut 3–6, 7–6^{(10–8)}, 7–6^{(7–3)}.

=== Doubles ===
- (Italy) Andrea Pellegrino / (Italy) Andrea Vavassori def. (Spain) Daniel Rincón / (Spain) Oriol Roca Batalla 6–2, 6–4.
