= 2024 Tampere Open =

- Date: 22–28 July
- Edition: 42nd
- Surface: Clay
- Location: Tampere, Finland

Champions

Singles
- (Spain) Daniel Rincón

Doubles
- (Spain) Íñigo Cervantes / (Spain) Daniel Rincón
- Tampere Open

The 2024 Tampere Open was a professional tennis tournament played on clay courts. It was the 42nd edition of the tournament which was part of the 2024 ATP Challenger Tour. It took place in Tampere, Finland, between 22 and 28 July 2024.

== Singles main draw entrants ==
=== Seeds ===
Country	Player	Rank^{1}	Seed
ARG	Francisco Comesaña	100	1
BOL	Murkel Dellien	168	2
KAZ	Dmitry Popko	186	3
FRA	Calvin Hemery	221	4
ESP	Javier Barranco Cosano	229	5
TUN	Aziz Dougaz	233	6
~~GBR~~	~~Oliver Crawford~~	~~236~~	~~7~~
FRA	Clément Tabur	238	8
ESP	Daniel Rincón	251	9

- ^{1} Rankings as of 15 July 2024.

=== Other entrants ===
The following players received wildcards into the singles main draw:

- (Finland) Vesa Ahti
- (Finland) Patrick Kaukovalta
- (Finland) Eero Vasa

The following players received entry into the singles main draw as alternates:

- (United Kingdom) Jay Clarke
- (France) Mathys Erhard
- Ivan Gakhov
- (Spain) Carlos Taberner

The following players received entry from the qualifying draw:

- (Czech Republic) Hynek Bartoň
- (Romania) Gabi Adrian Boitan
- (Germany) Tom Gentzsch
- (Switzerland) Henri Laaksonen
- (Netherlands) Jelle Sels
- (Argentina) Juan Bautista Torres

== Champions ==
=== Singles ===
- (Spain) Daniel Rincón def. (France) Calvin Hemery 6–1, 7–6^{(7–4)}.

=== Doubles ===
- (Spain) Íñigo Cervantes / (Spain) Daniel Rincón def. (Australia) Thomas Fancutt / (Denmark) Johannes Ingildsen 6–3, 6–4.
