= 2024 Copa Faulcombridge – Singles =

Singles
- 2024 Copa Faulcombridge

Final
- Champion: (Spain) Pedro Martínez
- Runner-up: (Portugal) Jaime Faria
- Score: 6–1, 6–3

Events
Singles	Doubles
- Copa Faulcombridge

Fabio Fognini was the defending champion but chose not to defend his title.

Pedro Martínez won the title after defeating Jaime Faria 6–1, 6–3 in the final.

== Seeds ==
1. (Spain) Pedro Martínez (champion)
2. (Chile) Cristian Garín (second round)
3. (Argentina) Thiago Agustín Tirante (quarterfinals)
4. (Colombia) Daniel Elahi Galán (semifinals)
5. (Spain) Albert Ramos Viñolas (first round)
6. (Czech Republic) Vít Kopřiva (first round)
7. (United States) Nicolas Moreno de Alboran (semifinals)
8. (Portugal) Henrique Rocha (first round)

== Draw ==
Key

- Q = Qualifier
- WC = Wild card
- LL = Lucky loser
- Alt = Alternate
- ITF = ITF entry
- PR = Protected ranking
- SR = Special ranking
- SE = Special exempt
- JE = Junior exempt
- JR = Junior Accelerator Programme entrant
- CO = College Accelerator Programme entrant
- NG = Next Gen Accelerator Program entrant
- w/o = Walkover
- r = Retired
- d = Defaulted

=== Finals ===
Semifinals
1/WC	(Spain) Pedro Martínez	7	6
4	(Colombia) Daniel Elahi Galán	5	3
7	(United States) Nicolas Moreno de Alboran	6	3	6^{2}
(Portugal) Jaime Faria	4	6	7^{7}

Final
1/WC	(Spain) Pedro Martínez	6	6
(Portugal) Jaime Faria	1	3

=== Top half ===
First round
1/WC	(Spain) P Martínez	7^{13}	7^{7}
(United States) Em Nava	6^{11}	6^{2}
(France) A Géa	6	0	7^{7}
WC	(Spain) B Zapata Miralles	2	6	6^{2}
Alt	(Germany) R Molleker	1	4
Q	(Spain) C Sánchez Jover	6	6
(Peru) I Buse	6	6
8	(Portugal) H Rocha	1	2
4	(Colombia) DE Galán	6	6
(Lithuania) V Gaubas	3	1
(Italy) A Pellegrino	6^{7}	5
Q	(Italy) R Brancaccio	7^{9}	7
(Italy) F Arnaboldi	1	0
(United Kingdom) J Choinski	6	6
Q	(Austria) J Schwärzler	7	6
6	(Czech Republic) V Kopřiva	5	4

Second round
1/WC	(Spain) P Martínez	6	7^{7}
(France) A Géa	3	6^{3}
Q	(Spain) C Sánchez Jover	4	3
(Peru) I Buse	6	6
4	(Colombia) DE Galán	6	7^{7}
Q	(Italy) R Brancaccio	4	6^{4}
(United Kingdom) J Choinski	6	6
Q	(Austria) J Schwärzler	3	2

Quarterfinals
1/WC	(Spain) P Martínez	7	6
(Peru) I Buse	5	3
4	(Colombia) DE Galán	6	3	6
(United Kingdom) J Choinski	3	6	2

Semifinals
1/WC	(Spain) P Martínez	7	6
4	(Colombia) DE Galán	5	3

=== Bottom half ===
First round
7	(United States) N Moreno de Alboran	6	6
(Bulgaria) A Andreev	4	2
(Spain) J Barranco Cosano	3	6	6
(Spain) O Roca Batalla	6	1	4
(Spain) C Taberner	6	7^{7}
Alt	(Romania) FC Jianu	2	6^{3}
Q	(Germany) C Negritu	6^{5}	6^{4}
3	(Argentina) TA Tirante	7^{7}	7^{7}
5	(Spain) A Ramos Viñolas	6^{6}	2
SE	(Denmark) E Møller	7^{8}	6
Q	I Gakhov	2	6	6^{3}
(Portugal) J Faria	6	2	7^{7}
Q	(Austria) D Novak	6	6
(Croatia) M Dodig	0	1
WC	(France) B Paire	3	2
2	(Chile) C Garín	6	6

Second round
7	(United States) N Moreno de Alboran	3	6	6
(Spain) J Barranco Cosano	6	2	4
(Spain) C Taberner	6^{2}	6	3
3	(Argentina) TA Tirante	7^{7}	3	6
SE	(Denmark) E Møller	6	5	3
(Portugal) J Faria	4	7	6
Q	(Austria) D Novak	6	7^{7}
2	(Chile) C Garín	4	6^{2}

Quarterfinals
7	(United States) N Moreno de Alboran	6^{0}	6	6
3	(Argentina) TA Tirante	7^{7}	4	2
(Portugal) J Faria	6	6
Q	(Austria) D Novak	3	1

Semifinals
7	(United States) N Moreno de Alboran	6	3	6^{2}
(Portugal) J Faria	4	6	7^{7}
