= 2025 Copa Faulcombridge – Doubles =

Doubles
- 2025 Copa Faulcombridge

Final
- Champions: (Brazil) Marcelo Demoliner (Brazil) Orlando Luz
- Runners-up: (Spain) Íñigo Cervantes (Israel) Daniel Cukierman
- Score: 6–3, 3–6, [10–5]

Events
Singles	Doubles
- Copa Faulcombridge

Alexander Merino and Christoph Negritu were the defending champions but lost in the quarterfinals to Íñigo Cervantes and Daniel Cukierman.

Marcelo Demoliner and Orlando Luz won the title after defeating Cervantes and Cukierman 6–3, 3–6, [10–5] in the final.

== Seeds ==
1. (Uruguay) Ariel Behar / (Brazil) Rafael Matos (semifinals)
2. (France) Théo Arribagé / (France) Albano Olivetti (first round)
3. (Brazil) Marcelo Demoliner / (Brazil) Orlando Luz (champions)
4. (India) Sriram Balaji / (India) Vijay Sundar Prashanth (quarterfinals)

== Draw ==
Key

- Q = Qualifier
- WC = Wild card
- LL = Lucky loser
- Alt = Alternate
- ITF = ITF entry
- PR = Protected ranking
- SR = Special ranking
- SE = Special exempt
- JE = Junior exempt
- JR = Junior Accelerator Programme entrant
- CO = College Accelerator Programme entrant
- NG = Next Gen Accelerator Program entrant
- w/o = Walkover
- r = Retired
- d = Defaulted

=== Draw ===
First round
1	(Uruguay) A Behar (Brazil) R Matos	2	6	[10]
Alt	(Spain) C Taberner (Italy) S Travaglia	6	0	[6]
(Spain) S Martos Gornés (Spain) D Vega Hernández	5	6	[10]
(Romania) V Cornea (Spain) B Pujol Navarro	7	4	[8]
3	(Brazil) M Demoliner (Brazil) O Luz	6	7
(Austria) D Pichler (Croatia) N Serdarušić	4	5
(Poland) F Pieczonka (Czech Republic) M Vrbenský	6	6
(Poland) P Matuszewski (Ukraine) D Molchanov	3	4
(United States) T Hilderbrand (United States) M Kiger	2	6	[10]
WC	(Spain) Carlos López Montagud (Spain) B Zapata Miralles	6	2	[6]
WC	(Spain) M Mansilla Díez (Spain) A Santamarta Roig	6^{3}	4
4	(India) S Balaji (India) VS Prashanth	7^{7}	6
(Spain) Í Cervantes (Israel) D Cukierman	4	6	[10]
(Romania) A Jecan; I Liutarevich	6	2	[7]
(Peru) A Merino (Germany) C Negritu	6	6
2	(France) T Arribagé (France) A Olivetti	2	4

Quarterfinals
1	(Uruguay) A Behar (Brazil) R Matos	6	7
(Spain) S Martos Gornés (Spain) D Vega Hernández	3	5
3	(Brazil) M Demoliner (Brazil) O Luz	7^{7}	6
(Poland) F Pieczonka (Czech Republic) M Vrbenský	6^{4}	4
(United States) T Hilderbrand (United States) M Kiger	6	6
4	(India) S Balaji (India) VS Prashanth	4	4
(Spain) Í Cervantes (Israel) D Cukierman	6	7^{7}
(Peru) A Merino (Germany) C Negritu	4	6^{0}

Semifinals
1	(Uruguay) A Behar (Brazil) R Matos	7	3	[8]
3	(Brazil) M Demoliner (Brazil) O Luz	5	6	[10]
(United States) T Hilderbrand (United States) M Kiger	2	6^{3}
(Spain) Í Cervantes (Israel) D Cukierman	6	7^{7}

Final
3	(Brazil) M Demoliner (Brazil) O Luz	6	3	[10]
(Spain) Í Cervantes (Israel) D Cukierman	3	6	[5]
