= 2026 Copa Faulconbridge – Doubles =

Doubles
- 2026 Copa Faulconbridge

Final
- Champions: (Germany) Constantin Frantzen (Netherlands) Robin Haase
- Runners-up: (Netherlands) Sander Arends (Netherlands) David Pel
- Score: 6–4, 6–7^{(5–7)}, [11–9]

Events
Singles	Doubles
- Copa Faulconbridge

Marcelo Demoliner and Orlando Luz were the defending champions but chose to defend their title with different partners. Demoliner partnered Sriram Balaji but lost in the first round to Jakub Paul and Matěj Vocel. Luz partnered Rafael Matos but lost in the semifinals to Sander Arends and David Pel.

Constantin Frantzen and Robin Haase won the title after defeating Arends and Pel 6–4, 6–7^{(5–7)}, [11–9] in the final.

== Seeds ==
1. (Brazil) Orlando Luz / (Brazil) Rafael Matos (semifinals)
2. (Brazil) Marcelo Melo / (Argentina) Andrés Molteni (first round)
3. (Netherlands) Sander Arends / (Netherlands) David Pel (final)
4. (Czech Republic) Adam Pavlásek / (Czech Republic) Patrik Rikl (first round)

== Draw ==
Key

- Q = Qualifier
- WC = Wild card
- LL = Lucky loser
- Alt = Alternate
- ITF = ITF entry
- PR = Protected ranking
- SR = Special ranking
- SE = Special exempt
- JE = Junior exempt
- JR = Junior Accelerator Programme entrant
- CO = College Accelerator Programme entrant
- NG = Next Gen Accelerator Program entrant
- w/o = Walkover
- r = Retired
- d = Defaulted

First round
1	(Brazil) O Luz (Brazil) R Matos	6	7^{11}
(United States) V Kirkov (Netherlands) B Stevens	4	6^{9}
(United States) S Kozlov (Venezuela) B Pérez	3	7	[6]
(United States) M Kiger (United States) R Stalder	6	5	[10]
3	(Netherlands) S Arends (Netherlands) D Pel	6	6
WC	(Spain) P Martínez (Spain) B Zapata Miralles	3	3
(India) S Balaji (Brazil) M Demoliner	4	6^{3}
(Switzerland) J Paul (Czech Republic) M Vocel	6	7^{7}
(Argentina) C Ugo Carabelli (Paraguay) AD Vallejo	6	6
(Italy) R Brancaccio (Spain) Carlos López Montagud	4	2
(Germany) C Frantzen (Netherlands) R Haase	7	7
4	(Czech Republic) A Pavlásek (Czech Republic) P Rikl	5	5
(Colombia) N Barrientos (Uruguay) A Behar	7^{9}	6
(Ecuador) D Hidalgo (United States) P Trhac	6^{7}	3
WC	(Spain) N Álvarez Varona (Spain) M Mansilla Díez	6	7
2	(Brazil) M Melo (Argentina) A Molteni	4	5

Quarterfinals
1	(Brazil) O Luz (Brazil) R Matos	6	7^{7}
(United States) M Kiger (United States) R Stalder	2	6^{5}
3	(Netherlands) S Arends (Netherlands) D Pel	2	6	[10]
(Switzerland) J Paul (Czech Republic) M Vocel	6	3	[6]
(Argentina) C Ugo Carabelli (Paraguay) AD Vallejo
(Germany) C Frantzen (Netherlands) R Haase	w/o
(Colombia) N Barrientos (Uruguay) A Behar	6	6^{6}	[10]
WC	(Spain) N Álvarez Varona (Spain) M Mansilla Díez	0	7^{8}	[7]

Semifinals
1	(Brazil) O Luz (Brazil) R Matos	5	7^{9}	[8]
3	(Netherlands) S Arends (Netherlands) D Pel	7	6^{7}	[10]
(Germany) C Frantzen (Netherlands) R Haase	7^{7}	3	[10]
(Colombia) N Barrientos (Uruguay) A Behar	6^{3}	6	[6]

Final
3	(Netherlands) S Arends (Netherlands) D Pel	4	7^{7}	[9]
(Germany) C Frantzen (Netherlands) R Haase	6	6^{5}	[11]
