= 2022 Copa Faulcombridge – Singles =

Singles
- 2022 Copa Faulcombridge

Final
- Champion: (Ukraine) Oleksii Krutykh
- Runner-up: (France) Luca Van Assche
- Score: 6–2, 6–0

Events
Singles	Doubles
- Copa Faulcombridge

This was the first edition of the tournament.

Oleksii Krutykh won the title after defeating Luca Van Assche 6–2, 6–0 in the final.

== Seeds ==
1. (Spain) Bernabé Zapata Miralles (withdrew)
2. (Spain) Roberto Carballés Baena (second round, retired)
3. (Portugal) Nuno Borges (second round)
4. (Serbia) Dušan Lajović (first round)
5. (France) Geoffrey Blancaneaux (first round)
6. (Kazakhstan) Timofey Skatov (first round)
7. (Spain) Carlos Taberner (first round)
8. (Italy) Luciano Darderi (second round)

== Draw ==
Key

- Q = Qualifier
- WC = Wild card
- LL = Lucky loser
- Alt = Alternate
- ITF = ITF entry
- PR = Protected ranking
- SR = Special ranking
- SE = Special exempt
- JE = Junior exempt
- JR = Junior Accelerator Programme entrant
- CO = College Accelerator Programme entrant
- NG = Next Gen Accelerator Program entrant
- w/o = Walkover
- r = Retired
- d = Defaulted

=== Finals ===
Semifinals
(Serbia) Nikola Milojević	6	3	5
Alt	(Ukraine) Oleksii Krutykh	3	6	7
Q	(Spain) Pablo Llamas Ruiz	6	4	2
(France) Luca Van Assche	4	6	6

Final
Alt	(Ukraine) Oleksii Krutykh	6	6
(France) Luca Van Assche	2	0

=== Top half ===
First round
LL	(Italy) A Giannessi	2	4
WC	(Spain) N Sánchez Izquierdo	6	6
(Serbia) N Milojević	6	7
WC	(Spain) D Mérida	3	5
PR	(Portugal) P Sousa	6	2	4
Q	I Gakhov	4	6	6
(Bulgaria) A Andreev	6	7
6	(Kazakhstan) T Skatov	4	5
3	(Portugal) N Borges	6	6
(Belgium) K Coppejans	3	2
Q	(Spain) Á López San Martín	3	2
(Italy) A Pellegrino	6	6
(Italy) R Bonadio	3	7	4
Alt	(Ukraine) O Krutykh	6	5	6
Q	(Italy) S Caruso	1	2
8	(Italy) L Darderi	6	6

Second round
WC	(Spain) N Sánchez Izquierdo	7	3	4
(Serbia) N Milojević	5	6	6
Q	I Gakhov	4	6	3
(Bulgaria) A Andreev	6	3	6
3	(Portugal) N Borges	6	2	1
(Italy) A Pellegrino	3	6	6
Alt	(Ukraine) O Krutykh	6	6
8	(Italy) L Darderi	4	4

Quarterfinals
(Serbia) N Milojević	0	6	6
(Bulgaria) A Andreev	6	4	4
(Italy) A Pellegrino	6	3	2
Alt	(Ukraine) O Krutykh	3	6	6

Semifinals
(Serbia) N Milojević	6	3	5
Alt	(Ukraine) O Krutykh	3	6	7

=== Bottom half ===
First round
5	(France) G Blancaneaux	6^{4}	4
WC	(Spain) Carlos López Montagud	7^{7}	6
Q	(Italy) GM Moroni	6	6
(Poland) D Michalski	3	3
(Spain) N Álvarez Varona	4	3
Q	(Spain) P Llamas Ruiz	6	6
(Serbia) M Zekić	6	7
4	(Serbia) D Lajović	3	5
7	(Spain) C Taberner	4	6^{2}
(Italy) A Vavassori	6	7^{7}
Q	(Spain) J Barranco Cosano	6	6
PR	(India) S Nagal	2	4
(Argentina) A Collarini	2	0^{r}
(France) L Van Assche	6	2
(Italy) R Brancaccio	5	0
2	(Spain) R Carballés Baena	7	6

Second round
WC	(Spain) C López Montagud	6	6
Q	(Italy) GM Moroni	1	3
Q	(Spain) P Llamas Ruiz	6	7
(Serbia) M Zekić	4	5
(Italy) A Vavassori	4	6	6^{2}
Q	(Spain) J Barranco Cosano	6	1	7^{7}
(France) L Van Assche	6	1
2	(Spain) R Carballés Baena	2	1^{r}

Quarterfinals
WC	(Spain) C López Montagud	2	5
Q	(Spain) P Llamas Ruiz	6	7
Q	(Spain) J Barranco Cosano	1	6^{4}
(France) L Van Assche	6	7^{7}

Semifinals
Q	(Spain) P Llamas Ruiz	6	4	2
(France) L Van Assche	4	6	6
