= 2024 Copa Faulcombridge – Doubles =

Doubles
- 2024 Copa Faulcombridge

Final
- Champions: (Peru) Alexander Merino (Germany) Christoph Negritu
- Runners-up: (Poland) Karol Drzewiecki (Poland) Piotr Matuszewski
- Score: 6–3, 6–4

Events
Singles	Doubles
- Copa Faulcombridge

Andrea Pellegrino and Andrea Vavassori were the defending champions but only Pellegrino chose to defend his title, partnering David Vega Hernández. They lost in the first round to Marco Bortolotti and Giorgio Ricca.

Alexander Merino and Christoph Negritu won the title after defeating Karol Drzewiecki and Piotr Matuszewski 6–3, 6–4 in the final.

== Seeds ==
1. (Romania) Victor Vlad Cornea / (Ukraine) Denys Molchanov (quarterfinals)
2. (Czech Republic) Petr Nouza / (Czech Republic) Patrik Rikl (first round)
3. (France) Théo Arribagé / (Portugal) Francisco Cabral (semifinals)
4. (India) Jeevan Nedunchezhiyan / (India) Vijay Sundar Prashanth (semifinals)

== Draw ==
Key

- Q = Qualifier
- WC = Wild card
- LL = Lucky loser
- Alt = Alternate
- ITF = ITF entry
- PR = Protected ranking
- SR = Special ranking
- SE = Special exempt
- JE = Junior exempt
- JR = Junior Accelerator Programme entrant
- CO = College Accelerator Programme entrant
- NG = Next Gen Accelerator Program entrant
- w/o = Walkover
- r = Retired
- d = Defaulted

=== Draw ===
First round
1	(Romania) V Cornea (Ukraine) D Molchanov	7^{7}	6
WC	(Spain) N Álvarez Varona (Spain) B Zapata Miralles	6^{3}	2
(Sweden) F Bergevi (Netherlands) M Veldheer	6^{6}	3
Alt	(Peru) A Merino (Germany) C Negritu	7^{8}	6
3	(France) T Arribagé (Portugal) F Cabral	6	6
(Serbia) I Sabanov (Serbia) M Sabanov	2	2
(United States) G Goldhoff (Brazil) F Romboli	6	3	[8]
(Spain) S Martos Gornés (Poland) S Walków	4	6	[10]
WC	(Spain) Carlos López Montagud (Spain) C Taberner	5	7	[6]
(Romania) A Jecan; I Liutarevich	7	5	[10]
(United States) V Kirkov (United States) E Nava	3	4
4	(India) J Nedunchezhiyan (India) VS Prashanth	6	6
(Italy) A Pellegrino (Spain) D Vega Hernández	4	0
(Italy) M Bortolotti (Italy) G Ricca	6	6
(Poland) K Drzewiecki (Poland) P Matuszewski	7^{8}	6
2	(Czech Republic) P Nouza (Czech Republic) P Rikl	6^{6}	2

Quarterfinals
1	(Romania) V Cornea (Ukraine) D Molchanov	3	3
Alt	(Peru) A Merino (Germany) C Negritu	6	6
3	(France) T Arribagé (Portugal) F Cabral	7^{7}	6
(Spain) S Martos Gornés (Poland) S Walków	6^{3}	4
(Romania) A Jecan; I Liutarevich	0	2
4	(India) J Nedunchezhiyan (India) VS Prashanth	6	6
(Italy) M Bortolotti (Italy) G Ricca	2	7^{9}	[7]
(Poland) K Drzewiecki (Poland) P Matuszewski	6	6^{7}	[10]

Semifinals
Alt	(Peru) A Merino (Germany) C Negritu	6	6^{3}	[10]
3	(France) T Arribagé (Portugal) F Cabral	4	7^{7}	[8]
4	(India) J Nedunchezhiyan (India) VS Prashanth	4	2
(Poland) K Drzewiecki (Poland) P Matuszewski	6	6

Final
Alt	(Peru) A Merino (Germany) C Negritu	6	6
(Poland) K Drzewiecki (Poland) P Matuszewski	3	4
