= 2026 Copa Faulconbridge – Singles =

Singles
- 2026 Copa Faulconbridge

Final
- Champion: (Serbia) Miomir Kecmanović
- Runner-up: (Paraguay) Daniel Vallejo
- Score: 6–2, 3–6, 6–2

Events
Singles	Doubles
- Copa Faulconbridge

Jan Choinski was the defending champion but chose not to defend his title.

Miomir Kecmanović won the title after defeating Daniel Vallejo 6–2, 3–6, 6–2 in the final.

This tournament marked the final appearance of former world number 37 Bernabé Zapata Miralles, where he lost in the first round to Vallejo.

== Seeds ==
The top four seeds received a bye into the second round.

1. (Chile) Alejandro Tabilo (semifinals)
2. (Spain) Jaume Munar (semifinals)
3. (Belgium) Zizou Bergs (quarterfinals)
4. (Argentina) Camilo Ugo Carabelli (quarterfinals)
5. (Germany) Daniel Altmaier (second round)
6. (Argentina) Sebastián Báez (second round)
7. (Serbia) Miomir Kecmanović (champion)
8. (Germany) Jan-Lennard Struff (first round)

== Draw ==
Key

- Q = Qualifier
- WC = Wild card
- LL = Lucky loser
- Alt = Alternate
- ITF = ITF entry
- PR = Protected ranking
- SR = Special ranking
- SE = Special exempt
- JE = Junior exempt
- JR = Junior Accelerator Programme entrant
- CO = College Accelerator Programme entrant
- NG = Next Gen Accelerator Program entrant
- w/o = Walkover
- r = Retired
- d = Defaulted

=== Finals ===
Semifinals
1	(Chile) Alejandro Tabilo	6^{0}	3
7	(Serbia) Miomir Kecmanović	7^{7}	6
(Paraguay) Daniel Vallejo	4	7^{7}	6
2	(Spain) Jaume Munar	6	6^{3}	4

Final
7	(Serbia) Miomir Kecmanović	6	3	6
(Paraguay) Daniel Vallejo	2	6	2

=== Top half ===
First round
(United States) A Kovacevic	6	5	6
(Spain) D Mérida	3	7	2
Alt	(Serbia) D Lajović	6	6
Alt	(Australia) C O'Connell	4	3
Q	(Germany) H Squire	3	3
5	(Germany) D Altmaier	6	6
(Italy) M Berrettini	6	6
Q	(Japan) T Daniel	4	2
Alt	(Bolivia) JC Prado Ángelo	7^{7}	1	3
Alt	(Switzerland) L Riedi	6^{5}	6	6
Q	(Norway) N Budkov Kjær	4	4
7	(Serbia) M Kecmanović	6	6

Second round
1	(Chile) A Tabilo	6	6
(United States) A Kovacevic	3	1
Alt	(Serbia) D Lajović	3	7	7^{7}
5	(Germany) D Altmaier	6	5	6^{5}
4	(Argentina) C Ugo Carabelli	7^{7}	6
(Italy) M Berrettini	6^{2}	4
Alt	(Switzerland) L Riedi	3	2
7	(Serbia) M Kecmanović	6	6

Quarterfinals
1	(Chile) A Tabilo	4	7	6
Alt	(Serbia) D Lajović	6	5	4
4	(Argentina) C Ugo Carabelli	1	1
7	(Serbia) M Kecmanović	6	6

Semifinals
1	(Chile) A Tabilo	6^{0}	3
7	(Serbia) M Kecmanović	7^{7}	6

=== Bottom half ===
First round
8	(Germany) J-L Struff	1	7	2
WC	(Spain) N Álvarez Varona	6	5	6
WC	(Spain) B Zapata Miralles	1	1
(Paraguay) AD Vallejo	6	6
(Spain) R Bautista Agut	6	6
Alt	(Spain) P Martínez	3	1
6	(Argentina) S Báez	6	6
WC	(Spain) R Carballés Baena	4	2
(Spain) P Carreño Busta	6	6
Alt	(Argentina) F Comesaña	4	3
(Bosnia and Herzegovina) D Džumhur	6	6^{3}	6
Q	(Spain) A Sánchez Quílez	1	7^{7}	4

Second round
WC	(Spain) N Álvarez Varona	6^{3}	0
(Paraguay) AD Vallejo	7^{7}	6
(Spain) R Bautista Agut	7^{7}	3	3
3	(Belgium) Z Bergs	6^{5}	6	6
6	(Argentina) S Báez	7	5	5
(Spain) P Carreño Busta	5	7	7
(Bosnia and Herzegovina) D Džumhur	2	6^{4}
2	(Spain) J Munar	6	7^{7}

Quarterfinals
(Paraguay) AD Vallejo	6	6
3	(Belgium) Z Bergs	4	3
(Spain) P Carreño Busta
2	(Spain) J Munar	w/o

Semifinals
(Paraguay) AD Vallejo	4	7^{7}	6
2	(Spain) J Munar	6	6^{3}	4
