= 2026 Copa Sevilla – Singles =

Singles
- 2026 Copa Sevilla

Final
- Champion: (Argentina) Facundo Díaz Acosta
- Runner-up: (Serbia) Dušan Lajović
- Score: 6–2, 6–1

Events
Singles	Doubles
- Copa Sevilla

Ignacio Buse was the defending champion but chose not to defend his title.

Facundo Díaz Acosta won the title after defeating Dušan Lajović 6–2, 6–1 in the final.

== Seeds ==
1. (Spain) Jaume Munar (semifinals)
2. (Spain) Martín Landaluce (first round)
3. (Argentina) Facundo Díaz Acosta (champion)
4. (Argentina) Marco Trungelliti (first round)
5. (Portugal) Henrique Rocha (quarterfinals)
6. (Lithuania) Vilius Gaubas (first round)
7. (Austria) Sebastian Ofner (quarterfinals)
8. (Spain) Pablo Llamas Ruiz (second round)

== Draw ==
Key

- Q = Qualifier
- WC = Wild card
- LL = Lucky loser
- Alt = Alternate
- ITF = ITF entry
- PR = Protected ranking
- SR = Special ranking
- SE = Special exempt
- JE = Junior exempt
- JR = Junior Accelerator Programme entrant
- CO = College Accelerator Programme entrant
- NG = Next Gen Accelerator Program entrant
- w/o = Walkover
- r = Retired
- d = Defaulted

=== Finals ===
Semifinals
1/WC	(Spain) Jaume Munar	6	3	6^{1}
3	(Argentina) Facundo Díaz Acosta	4	6	7^{7}
(Spain) Max Alcalá Gurri	3	0^{r}
(Serbia) Dušan Lajović	6	3

Final
3	(Argentina) Facundo Díaz Acosta	6	6
(Serbia) Dušan Lajović	2	1

=== Top half ===
First round
1/WC	(Spain) J Munar	4	6	6
Q	(Spain) O Roca Batalla	6	4	1
Q	(Spain) C Sánchez Jover	6	4	4
(Peru) G Bueno	0	6	6
LL	(Czech Republic) J Forejtek	2	6	1
(Italy) R Brancaccio	6	2	6
(Belgium) K Coppejans	3	6	3
8	(Spain) P Llamas Ruiz	6	4	6
3	(Argentina) F Díaz Acosta	6	2	6
(Spain) P Martín Tiffon	3	6	2
NG	(Czech Republic) Petr Brunclík	6	3	3
(Spain) A Moro Cañas	4	6	6
(Spain) R Carballés Baena	6^{5}	3
Q	(Switzerland) A Ritschard	7^{7}	6
(United Kingdom) F Gill	4	2
7	(Austria) S Ofner	6	6

Second round
1/WC	(Spain) J Munar	w/o
(Peru) G Bueno
(Italy) R Brancaccio	5	6	6
8	(Spain) P Llamas Ruiz	7	3	3
3	(Argentina) F Díaz Acosta	6	7
(Spain) A Moro Cañas	1	5
Q	(Switzerland) A Ritschard	4	4
7	(Austria) S Ofner	6	6

Quarterfinals
1/WC	(Spain) J Munar	2	6	6
(Italy) R Brancaccio	6	1	1
3	(Argentina) F Díaz Acosta	7	6
7	(Austria) S Ofner	5	2

Semifinals
1/WC	(Spain) J Munar	6	3	6^{1}
3	(Argentina) F Díaz Acosta	4	6	7^{7}

=== Bottom half ===
First round
6	(Lithuania) V Gaubas	2	6	0
Q	Pavel Lagutin	6	3	6
Q	(South Korea) G Campaña Lee	1	5
(Spain) M Alcalá Gurri	6	7
(Argentina) GA Olivieri	6	3	6
Alt	(United States) Dali Blanch	3	6	1
LL	(Portugal) T Pereira	6	4	6
4	(Argentina) M Trungelliti	4	6	4
5	(Portugal) H Rocha	6	7^{13}
WC	(Spain) C Taberner	3	6^{11}
(Spain) N Sánchez Izquierdo	6	3	5
Q	(Argentina) S Rodríguez Taverna	1	6	7
(Belgium) GA Bailly	0	0^{r}
Alt	(France) C Hemery	6	0
(Serbia) D Lajović	6	6
2/WC	(Spain) M Landaluce	0	4

Second round
Q	P Lagutin	7^{7}	2	6^{6}
(Spain) M Alcalá Gurri	6^{3}	6	7^{8}
(Argentina) GA Olivieri	6	6
LL	(Portugal) T Pereira	1	3
5	(Portugal) H Rocha	6	6
Q	(Argentina) S Rodríguez Taverna	4	1
Alt	(France) C Hemery	4	2
(Serbia) D Lajović	6	6

Quarterfinals
(Spain) M Alcalá Gurri	6	5	6
(Argentina) GA Olivieri	1	7	3
5	(Portugal) H Rocha	4	4
(Serbia) D Lajović	6	6

Semifinals
(Spain) M Alcalá Gurri	3	0^{r}
(Serbia) D Lajović	6	3
