= 2024 Tampere Open – Singles =

Singles
- 2024 Tampere Open

Final
- Champion: (Spain) Daniel Rincón
- Runner-up: (France) Calvin Hemery
- Score: 6–1, 7–6^{(7–4)}

Events
Singles	Doubles
- Tampere Open

Sumit Nagal was the defending champion but chose not to defend his title.

Daniel Rincón won the title after defeating Calvin Hemery 6–1, 7–6^{(7–4)} in the final.

== Seeds ==
1. (Argentina) Francisco Comesaña (quarterfinals)
2. (Bolivia) Murkel Dellien (first round)
3. (Kazakhstan) Dmitry Popko (second round)
4. (France) Calvin Hemery (final)
5. (Spain) Javier Barranco Cosano (semifinals)
6. (Tunisia) Aziz Dougaz (quarterfinals)
7. (United Kingdom) Oliver Crawford (withdrew)
8. (France) Clément Tabur (second round)
9. (Spain) Daniel Rincón (champion)

== Draw ==
Key

- Q = Qualifier
- WC = Wild card
- LL = Lucky loser
- Alt = Alternate
- ITF = ITF entry
- PR = Protected ranking
- SR = Special ranking
- SE = Special exempt
- JE = Junior exempt
- JR = Junior Accelerator Programme entrant
- CO = College Accelerator Programme entrant
- NG = Next Gen Accelerator Program entrant
- w/o = Walkover
- r = Retired
- d = Defaulted

=== Finals ===
Semifinals
5	(Spain) Javier Barranco Cosano	2	7^{7}	3
4	(France) Calvin Hemery	6	6^{4}	6
Q	(Romania) Gabi Adrian Boitan	6^{6}	4
9	(Spain) Daniel Rincón	7^{8}	6

Final
4	(France) Calvin Hemery	1	6^{4}
9	(Spain) Daniel Rincón	6	7^{7}

=== Top half ===
First round
1	(Argentina) F Comesaña	2	6	6
(Czech Republic) J Veselý	6	3	3
(Spain) N Sánchez Izquierdo	6^{3}	5
(France) T Lamasine	7^{7}	7
(Czech Republic) M Vrbenský	4	3
(Argentina) S Rodríguez Taverna	6	6
(Italy) G Fonio	6^{5}	2
5	(Spain) J Barranco Cosano	7^{7}	6
4	(France) C Hemery	6	2	7^{7}
Alt	(France) Mathys Erhard	4	6	6^{5}
WC	(Finland) E Vasa	6	6^{3}	5
WC	(Finland) Vesa Ahti	4	7^{7}	7
(Germany) M Möller	6	6
WC	(Finland) Patrick Kaukovalta	3	2
Q	(Germany) T Gentzsch	3	3
8	(France) C Tabur	6	6

Second round
1	(Argentina) F Comesaña	6	5	6
(France) T Lamasine	3	7	1
(Argentina) S Rodríguez Taverna	3	2
5	(Spain) J Barranco Cosano	6	6
4	(France) C Hemery	6	6
WC	(Finland) V Ahti	1	0
(Germany) M Möller	6	6
8	(France) C Tabur	4	3

Quarterfinals
1	(Argentina) F Comesaña	2	5
5	(Spain) J Barranco Cosano	6	7
4	(France) C Hemery	5	6	6
(Germany) M Möller	7	2	4

Semifinals
5	(Spain) J Barranco Cosano	2	7^{7}	3
4	(France) C Hemery	6	6^{4}	6

=== Bottom half ===
First round
6	(Tunisia) A Dougaz	6	6
(Czech Republic) D Svrčina	3	4
Q	(Switzerland) H Laaksonen	3	4
(Belgium) G Onclin	6	6
Q	(Czech Republic) H Bartoň	3	6	2
Q	(Romania) GA Boitan	6	0	6
(Argentina) F Mena	6	3	5
3	(Kazakhstan) D Popko	4	6	7
9	(Spain) D Rincón	7	2
Alt	(United Kingdom) J Clarke	5	0^{r}
Q	(Netherlands) J Sels	7	7^{7}
Alt	I Gakhov	5	6^{5}
Q	(Argentina) JB Torres	7^{7}	6
(Turkey) E Kırkın	6^{5}	2
Alt	(Spain) C Taberner	4	6	6
2	(Bolivia) M Dellien	6	3	3

Second round
6	(Tunisia) A Dougaz	7	6
(Belgium) G Onclin	5	3
Q	(Romania) GA Boitan	3	6	6
3	(Kazakhstan) D Popko	6	3	3
9	(Spain) D Rincón	2	6	6
Q	(Netherlands) J Sels	6	4	1
Q	(Argentina) JB Torres	2	3
Alt	(Spain) C Taberner	6	6

Quarterfinals
6	(Tunisia) A Dougaz	3	6^{2}
Q	(Romania) GA Boitan	6	7^{7}
9	(Spain) D Rincón	7	6
Alt	(Spain) C Taberner	5	4

Semifinals
Q	(Romania) GA Boitan	6^{6}	4
9	(Spain) D Rincón	7^{8}	6
