= 2026 Copa Faulconbridge =

- Date: 12–17 May
- Edition: 5th
- Surface: Clay
- Location: Valencia, Spain

Champions

Singles
- (Serbia) Miomir Kecmanović

Doubles
- (Germany) Constantin Frantzen / (Netherlands) Robin Haase
- Copa Faulconbridge

The 2026 Copa Faulconbridge by Marcos Automoción was a professional tennis tournament played on clay courts. It was the fifth edition of the tournament which was part of the 2026 ATP Challenger Tour. It took place in Valencia, Spain between 12 and 17 May 2026.

== Singles main-draw entrants ==
=== Seeds ===
Country	Player	Rank^{1}	Seed
CHI	Alejandro Tabilo	35	1
ESP	Jaume Munar	38	2
BEL	Zizou Bergs	39	3
ARG	Camilo Ugo Carabelli	61	4
GER	Daniel Altmaier	64	5
ARG	Sebastián Báez	65	6
SRB	Miomir Kecmanović	70	7
GER	Jan-Lennard Struff	83	8

- ^{1} Rankings are as of 4 May 2026.

=== Other entrants ===
The following players received wildcards into the singles main draw:

- (Spain) Nicolás Álvarez Varona
- (Spain) Roberto Carballés Baena
- (Spain) Bernabé Zapata Miralles

The following players received entry into the singles main draw as alternates:

- (Argentina) Francisco Comesaña
- (Serbia) Dušan Lajović
- (Spain) Pedro Martínez
- (Australia) Christopher O'Connell
- (Bolivia) Juan Carlos Prado Ángelo
- (Switzerland) Leandro Riedi

The following players received entry from the qualifying draw:

- (Norway) Nicolai Budkov Kjær
- (Japan) Taro Daniel
- (Spain) Alejo Sánchez Quílez
- (Germany) Henri Squire

== Champions ==
=== Singles ===
- (Serbia) Miomir Kecmanović def. (Paraguay) Daniel Vallejo 6–2, 3–6, 6–2.

=== Doubles ===
- (Germany) Constantin Frantzen / (Netherlands) Robin Haase def. (Netherlands) Sander Arends / (Netherlands) David Pel 6–4, 6–7^{(5–7)}, [11–9].
