= 2026 Copa Sevilla – Doubles =

Doubles
- 2026 Copa Sevilla

Final
- Champions: (Colombia) Nicolás Barrientos (Argentina) Mariano Kestelboim
- Runners-up: (Spain) Íñigo Cervantes (Ukraine) Denys Molchanov
- Score: 7–6^{(7–3)}, 6–3

Events
Singles	Doubles
- Copa Sevilla

Jonáš Forejtek and Dominik Kellovský were the defending champions but lost in the first round to Erik Grevelius and Adam Heinonen.

Nicolás Barrientos and Mariano Kestelboim won the title after defeating Íñigo Cervantes and Denys Molchanov 7–6^{(7–3)}, 6–3 in the final.

== Seeds ==
1. (United Kingdom) David Stevenson / (United Kingdom) Marcus Willis (first round)
2. (Uruguay) Ariel Behar / (Brazil) Fernando Romboli (semifinals)
3. (Colombia) Nicolás Barrientos / (Argentina) Mariano Kestelboim (champions)
4. (Sweden) Erik Grevelius / (Sweden) Adam Heinonen (quarterfinals)

== Draw ==
Key

- Q = Qualifier
- WC = Wild card
- LL = Lucky loser
- Alt = Alternate
- ITF = ITF entry
- PR = Protected ranking
- SR = Special ranking
- SE = Special exempt
- JE = Junior exempt
- JR = Junior Accelerator Programme entrant
- CO = College Accelerator Programme entrant
- NG = Next Gen Accelerator Program entrant
- w/o = Walkover
- r = Retired
- d = Defaulted

First round
1	(United Kingdom) D Stevenson (United Kingdom) M Willis	4	4
(Spain) M Mansilla Díez (Portugal) T Pereira	6	6
(Poland) S Kielan (Belgium) J Vliegen	6	7^{9}
(Argentina) S Rodríguez Taverna (Spain) B Winter López	3	6^{7}
4	(Sweden) E Grevelius (Sweden) A Heinonen	7^{7}	6
WC	(Czech Republic) J Forejtek (Czech Republic) D Kellovský	6^{2}	3
(United Kingdom) F Bass (United Kingdom) S Duncan	7^{8}	6^{8}	[6]
(Spain) Í Cervantes (Ukraine) D Molchanov	6^{6}	7^{10}	[10]
(Romania) A Jecan (Romania) B Pavel	6	6
(Italy) R Brancaccio (Spain) B Pujol Navarro	3	4
(Spain) S Martos Gornés (Poland) S Walków	6	4	[2]
3	(Colombia) N Barrientos (Argentina) M Kestelboim	3	6	[10]
Alt	(Spain) A Barroso Campos (Spain) D Vega Hernández	2	6^{5}
WC	(Spain) P Llamas Ruiz (Spain) Alvaro Núñez Serrano	6	7^{7}
(Spain) M Alcalá Gurri (Spain) N Sánchez Izquierdo	6^{3}	3
2	(Uruguay) A Behar (Brazil) F Romboli	7^{7}	6

Quarterfinals
(Spain) M Mansilla Díez (Portugal) T Pereira	6	6^{5}	[6]
(Poland) S Kielan (Belgium) J Vliegen	4	7^{7}	[10]
4	(Sweden) E Grevelius (Sweden) A Heinonen	6	2	[10]
(Spain) Í Cervantes (Ukraine) D Molchanov	4	6	[12]
(Romania) A Jecan (Romania) B Pavel	1	4
3	(Colombia) N Barrientos (Argentina) M Kestelboim	6	6
WC	(Spain) P Llamas Ruiz (Spain) A Núñez Serrano	5	5
2	(Uruguay) A Behar (Brazil) F Romboli	7	7

Semifinals
(Poland) S Kielan (Belgium) J Vliegen	2	6	[6]
(Spain) Í Cervantes (Ukraine) D Molchanov	6	1	[10]
3	(Colombia) N Barrientos (Argentina) M Kestelboim	7^{7}	3	[10]
2	(Uruguay) A Behar (Brazil) F Romboli	6^{3}	6	[7]

Final
(Spain) Í Cervantes (Ukraine) D Molchanov	6^{3}	3
3	(Colombia) N Barrientos (Argentina) M Kestelboim	7^{7}	6
