= 2026 Copa Sevilla =

- Date: 7–13 September
- Edition: 28th
- Surface: Clay
- Location: Seville, Spain

Champions

Singles
- (Argentina) Facundo Díaz Acosta

Doubles
- (Colombia) Nicolás Barrientos / (Argentina) Mariano Kestelboim
- Copa Sevilla

The 2026 Copa Sevilla was a professional tennis tournament played on clay courts. It was the 28th edition of the tournament which was part of the 2026 ATP Challenger Tour. It took place in Seville, Spain between 7 and 13 September 2026.

== Singles main-draw entrants ==
=== Seeds ===
Country	Player	Rank^{1}	Seed
ESP	Jaume Munar	55	1
ESP	Martín Landaluce	65	2
ARG	Facundo Díaz Acosta	82	3
ARG	Marco Trungelliti	83	4
POR	Henrique Rocha	120	5
LTU	Vilius Gaubas	121	6
AUT	Sebastian Ofner	125	7
ESP	Pablo Llamas Ruiz	126	8

- ^{1} Rankings are as of 31 August 2026.

=== Other entrants ===
The following players received wildcards into the singles main draw:

- (Spain) Martín Landaluce
- (Spain) Jaume Munar
- (Spain) Carlos Taberner

The following player received entry into the singles main draw through the Next Gen Accelerator programme:

- (Czech Republic) Petr Brunclík

The following players received entry into the singles main draw as alternates:

- (United States) Dali Blanch
- (France) Calvin Hemery

The following players received entry from the qualifying draw:

- (South Korea) Gerard Campaña Lee
- Pavel Lagutin
- (Switzerland) Alexander Ritschard
- (Spain) Oriol Roca Batalla
- (Argentina) Santiago Rodríguez Taverna
- (Spain) Carlos Sánchez Jover

The following players received entry as lucky losers:

- (Czech Republic) Jonáš Forejtek
- (Portugal) Tiago Pereira

== Champions ==
=== Singles ===
- (Argentina) Facundo Díaz Acosta def. (Serbia) Dušan Lajović 6–2, 6–1.

=== Doubles ===
- (Colombia) Nicolás Barrientos / (Argentina) Mariano Kestelboim def. (Spain) Íñigo Cervantes / (Ukraine) Denys Molchanov 7–6^{(7–3)}, 6–3.
