= 2025 Copa Faulcombridge =

- Date: 6–12 October
- Edition: 4th
- Surface: Clay
- Location: Valencia, Spain

Champions

Singles
- (United Kingdom) Jan Choinski

Doubles
- (Brazil) Marcelo Demoliner / (Brazil) Orlando Luz
- Copa Faulcombridge

The 2025 Copa Faulcombridge by Marcos Automoción was a professional tennis tournament played on clay courts. It was the fourth edition of the tournament which was part of the 2025 ATP Challenger Tour. It took place in Valencia, Spain, between 6 and 12 October 2025.

== Singles main-draw entrants ==
=== Seeds ===
Country	Player	Rank^{1}	Seed
ESP	Pedro Martínez	73	1
CZE	Vít Kopřiva	93	2
ESP	Carlos Taberner	104	3
PER	Ignacio Buse	108	4
DEN	Elmer Møller	122	5
SRB	Dušan Lajović	126	6
~~COL~~	~~Daniel Elahi Galán~~	~~134~~	~~7~~
~~ITA~~	~~Andrea Pellegrino~~	~~136~~	~~8~~
ARG	Marco Trungelliti	141	9
LTU	Vilius Gaubas	143	10

- ^{1} Rankings are as of 29 September 2025.

=== Other entrants ===
The following players received wildcards into the singles main draw:

- (Spain) Carlos López Montagud
- (Spain) Albert Ramos Viñolas
- (Spain) Bernabé Zapata Miralles

The following player received entry into the singles main draw through the Next Gen Accelerator programme:

- (Germany) Diego Dedura

The following players received entry into the singles main draw as alternates:

- (Czech Republic) Zdeněk Kolář
- (Spain) Pol Martín Tiffon

The following players received entry from the qualifying draw:

- (Romania) Cezar Crețu
- (Spain) Miguel Damas
- Ivan Gakhov
- (India) Sumit Nagal
- (Spain) Carlos Sánchez Jover
- (Germany) Henri Squire

The following players received entry as lucky losers:

- (Germany) Christoph Negritu
- (Portugal) Tiago Pereira

== Champions ==
=== Singles ===
- (United Kingdom) Jan Choinski def. (Croatia) Luka Mikrut 4–6, 6–1, 6–2.

=== Doubles ===
- (Brazil) Marcelo Demoliner / (Brazil) Orlando Luz def. (Spain) Íñigo Cervantes / (Israel) Daniel Cukierman 6–3, 3–6, [10–5].
