= 2024 Copa Faulcombridge =

- Date: 6–13 October
- Edition: 3rd
- Surface: Clay
- Location: Valencia, Spain

Champions

Singles
- (Spain) Pedro Martínez

Doubles
- (Peru) Alexander Merino / (Germany) Christoph Negritu
- Copa Faulcombridge

The 2024 Copa Faulcombridge by Marcos Automoción was a professional tennis tournament played on clay courts. It was the third edition of the tournament which was part of the 2024 ATP Challenger Tour. It took place in Valencia, Spain, between 6 and 13 October 2024.

== Singles main-draw entrants ==
=== Seeds ===
Country	Player	Rank^{1}	Seed
ESP	Pedro Martínez	45	1
CHI	Cristian Garín	122	2
ARG	Thiago Agustín Tirante	124	3
COL	Daniel Elahi Galán	127	4
ESP	Albert Ramos Viñolas	134	5
CZE	Vít Kopřiva	142	6
USA	Nicolas Moreno de Alboran	144	7
POR	Henrique Rocha	163	8

- ^{1} Rankings are as of 30 September 2024.

=== Other entrants ===
The following players received wildcards into the singles main draw:

- (Spain) Pedro Martínez
- (France) Benoît Paire
- (Spain) Bernabé Zapata Miralles

The following player received entry into the singles main draw as a special exempt:

- (Denmark) Elmer Møller

The following players received entry into the singles main draw as alternates:

- (Romania) Filip Cristian Jianu
- (Germany) Rudolf Molleker

The following players received entry from the qualifying draw:

- (Italy) Raúl Brancaccio
- Ivan Gakhov
- (Germany) Christoph Negritu
- (Austria) Dennis Novak
- (Spain) Carlos Sánchez Jover
- (Austria) Joel Schwärzler

== Champions ==
=== Singles ===
- (Spain) Pedro Martínez def. (Portugal) Jaime Faria 6–1, 6–3.

=== Doubles ===
- (Peru) Alexander Merino / (Germany) Christoph Negritu def. (Poland) Karol Drzewiecki / (Poland) Piotr Matuszewski 6–3, 6–4.
