= 2022 Copa Faulcombridge =

- Date: 21–27 November
- Edition: 1st
- Surface: Clay
- Location: Valencia, Spain

Champions

Singles
- (Ukraine) Oleksii Krutykh

Doubles
- (Ukraine) Oleksii Krutykh / (Spain) Oriol Roca Batalla
- Copa Faulcombridge

The 2022 Copa Faulcombridge Ciudad de Valencia was a professional tennis tournament played on clay courts. It was the first edition of the tournament which was part of the 2022 ATP Challenger Tour. It took place in Valencia, Spain, between 21 and 27 November 2022.

== Singles main-draw entrants ==
=== Seeds ===
Country	Player	Rank^{1}	Seed
~~ESP~~	~~Bernabé Zapata Miralles~~	~~74~~	~~1~~
ESP	Roberto Carballés Baena	77	2
POR	Nuno Borges	92	3
SRB	Dušan Lajović	100	4
FRA	Geoffrey Blancaneaux	134	5
KAZ	Timofey Skatov	142	6
ESP	Carlos Taberner	167	7
ITA	Luciano Darderi	176	8

- ^{1} Rankings are as of 14 November 2022.

=== Other entrants ===
The following players received wildcards into the singles main draw:

- (Spain) Carlos López Montagud
- (Spain) Daniel Mérida
- (Spain) Nikolás Sánchez Izquierdo

The following players received entry into the singles main draw using protected rankings:

- (India) Sumit Nagal
- (Portugal) Pedro Sousa

The following player received entry into the singles main draw as an alternate:

- (Ukraine) Oleksii Krutykh

The following players received entry from the qualifying draw:

- (Spain) Javier Barranco Cosano
- (Italy) Salvatore Caruso
- Ivan Gakhov
- (Spain) Pablo Llamas Ruiz
- (Spain) Álvaro López San Martín
- (Italy) Gian Marco Moroni

The following player received entry as a lucky loser:

- (Italy) Alessandro Giannessi

== Champions ==
=== Singles ===
- (Ukraine) Oleksii Krutykh def. (France) Luca Van Assche 6–2, 6–0.

=== Doubles ===
- (Ukraine) Oleksii Krutykh / (Spain) Oriol Roca Batalla def. (Serbia) Ivan Sabanov / (Serbia) Matej Sabanov 6–3, 7–6^{(7–3)}.
