= 2024 Tampere Open – Doubles =

Doubles
- 2024 Tampere Open

Final
- Champions: (Spain) Íñigo Cervantes (Spain) Daniel Rincón
- Runners-up: (Australia) Thomas Fancutt (Denmark) Johannes Ingildsen
- Score: 6–3, 6–4

Events
Singles	Doubles
- Tampere Open

Szymon Kielan and Piotr Matuszewski were the defending champions but only Kielan chose to defend his title, partnering Patrick Kaukovalta. They lost in the first round to Íñigo Cervantes and Daniel Rincón.

Cervantes and Rincón won the title after defeating Thomas Fancutt and Johannes Ingildsen 6–3, 6–4 in the final.

== Seeds ==
1. (South Korea) Nam Ji-sung / (United States) Hunter Reese (quarterfinals)
2. (Australia) Thomas Fancutt / (Denmark) Johannes Ingildsen (final)
3. (France) Constantin Bittoun Kouzmine / (United Kingdom) Jay Clarke (withdrew)
4. (Spain) Íñigo Cervantes / (Spain) Daniel Rincón (champions)

== Draw ==
Key

- Q = Qualifier
- WC = Wild card
- LL = Lucky loser
- Alt = Alternate
- ITF = ITF entry
- PR = Protected ranking
- SR = Special ranking
- SE = Special exempt
- JE = Junior exempt
- JR = Junior Accelerator Programme entrant
- CO = College Accelerator Programme entrant
- NG = Next Gen Accelerator Program entrant
- w/o = Walkover
- r = Retired
- d = Defaulted

=== Draw ===
First round
(Spain) N Sánchez Izquierdo (Spain) C Taberner	3	2
(Czech Republic) H Bartoň (Czech Republic) J Veselý	6	6
4	(Spain) Í Cervantes (Spain) D Rincón	7^{7}	6^{4}	[10]
(Finland) Patrick Kaukovalta (Poland) S Kielan	6^{5}	7^{7}	[6]
(Czech Republic) Jiří Barnat (Czech Republic) F Duda	7	6
WC	(Finland) Peetu Pohjola (Finland) Hermanni Tiainen	5	0
(Czech Republic) D Svrčina (Czech Republic) M Vrbenský	7^{7}	6
WC	(Finland) E Vasa (Finland) Iiro Vasa	6^{4}	3
(Argentina) F Comesaña (Argentina) JB Torres
(Turkey) E Kırkın (Kazakhstan) D Popko	w/o

Quarterfinals
1	(South Korea) J-s Nam (United States) H Reese	3	6^{8}
(Czech Republic) H Bartoň (Czech Republic) J Veselý	6	7^{10}
4	(Spain) Í Cervantes (Spain) D Rincón	6	7
(Czech Republic) J Barnat (Czech Republic) F Duda	1	5
(Czech Republic) D Svrčina (Czech Republic) M Vrbenský	7	6
Alt	(France) C Hemery (Argentina) S Rodríguez Taverna	5	3
(Turkey) E Kırkın (Kazakhstan) D Popko	4	4
2	(Australia) T Fancutt (Denmark) J Ingildsen	6	6

Semifinals
(Czech Republic) H Bartoň (Czech Republic) J Veselý	6^{3}	6	[7]
4	(Spain) Í Cervantes (Spain) D Rincón	7^{7}	3	[10]
(Czech Republic) D Svrčina (Czech Republic) M Vrbenský	2	6	[10]
2	(Australia) T Fancutt (Denmark) J Ingildsen	6	3	[12]

Final
4	(Spain) Í Cervantes (Spain) D Rincón	6	6
2	(Australia) T Fancutt (Denmark) J Ingildsen	3	4
