= Luis Riba =

Spanish tennis player (born 1967)

- Country (sports): Spain
- Born: November 11, 1967 (age 58) Barcelona, Spain
- Plays: Right-handed
- Coach: Félix Riba
- Prize money: US$938

Singles
- Highest ranking: No. 440 (28 July 1986)

Grand Slam singles results
- French Open Junior: 1R (1985)

Doubles
- Highest ranking: No. 525 (10 November 1986)

Grand Slam doubles results
- French Open Junior: 1R (1985)
Medal record
Mediterranean Games
Bronze medal – third place	1987 Latakia	Doubles
- Last updated on: April 13, 2020.

Luis Riba Farrés (born November 11, 1967) is a former Spanish tennis player who won a bronze medal at the 1987 Mediterranean Games and reached as high as the 23rd position in the Spanish national ranking.

Riba won the Copa Faulcombridge in 1989.

A former coach of Olympic champion Nicolás Massú, he is not related to fellow countryman Pere Riba.
