= Íñigo Cervantes =

Spanish tennis player (born 1989)

Íñigo Cervantes Huegun
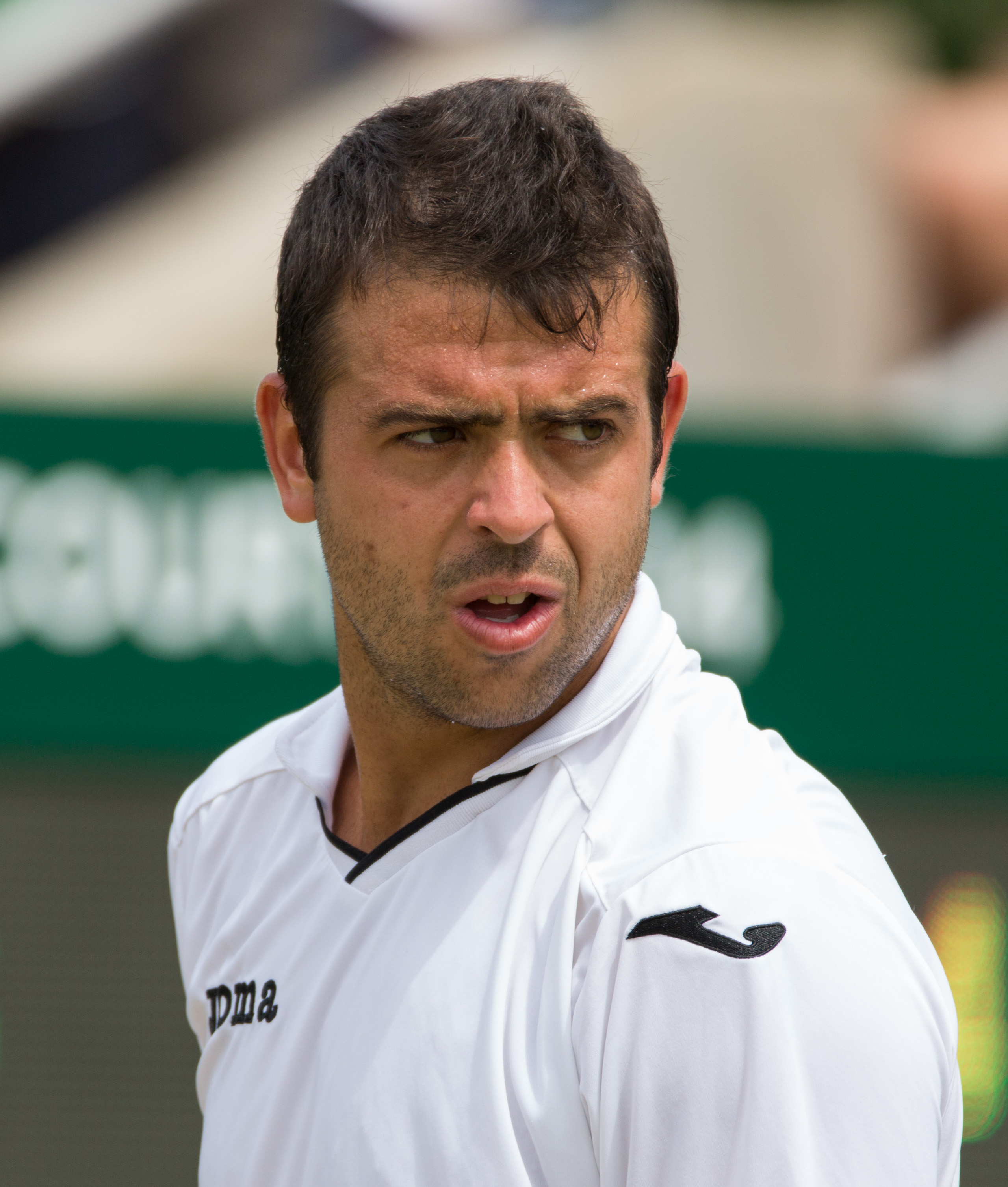
- Country (sports): Spain
- Residence: Xàbia, Valencian Community
- Born: 30 November 1989 (age 36) Hondarribia, Gipuzkoa
- Height: 1.83 m (6 ft 0 in)
- Turned pro: 2009
- Plays: Right-handed (two-handed backhand)
- Coach: Javier Ferrer; Israel Vior
- Prize money: $ 1,184,032

Singles
- Career record: 17–32
- Highest ranking: No. 56 (21 March 2016)

Grand Slam singles results
- Australian Open: 1R (2016)
- French Open: 1R (2016)
- Wimbledon: 2R (2012)
- US Open: 1R (2016)

Doubles
- Career record: 8–21
- Career titles: 0
- Highest ranking: No. 95 (23 June 2025)
- Current ranking: No. 103 (10 November 2025)
- Last updated on: 15 November 2025.

Íñigo Cervantes Huegun García (Spanish pronunciation: [ˈiɲiɣo θeɾˈβantes]; born 30 November 1989) is a Spanish professional tennis player who currently specializes in doubles. He has a career-high ATP doubles ranking of world No. 95 achieved on 23 June 2025. He also has a career-high singles ranking of No. 56 achieved on 21 March 2016.

== Career ==
He defeated Dmitry Tursunov at the 2014 ATP 500 Barcelona, Federico Delbonis at the 2016 ATP 250 São Paulo, and Alexander Zverev at the 2016 German Open.

He is the son of professional footballer Manuel Cervantes.

== ATP career finals ==
=== Doubles: 1 (1 runner-up) ===
Winner – Legend Grand Slam Tournaments (0–0) ATP World Tour Finals (0–0) ATP World Tour Masters 1000 (0–0) ATP World Tour 500 Series (0–0) ATP World Tour 250 Series (0–1)	Titles by surface Hard (0–0) Clay (0–1) Grass (0–0) Carpet (0–0)

Outcome	Date	Tournament	Surface	Partner	Opponents	Score
Runner-up	14 February 2016	Argentina Open, Buenos Aires, Argentina	Clay	(Italy) Paolo Lorenzi	(Colombia) Juan Sebastián Cabal (Colombia) Robert Farah	3–6, 0–6

== Performance timeline ==
Key
W	F	SF	QF	#R	RR	Q#	DNQ	A	NH

(W) winner; (F) finalist; (SF) semifinalist; (QF) quarterfinalist; (#R) rounds 4, 3, 2, 1; (RR) round-robin stage; (Q#) qualification round; (DNQ) did not qualify; (A) absent; (NH) not held; (SR) strike rate (events won / competed); (W–L) win–loss record.
To avoid confusion and double counting, these charts are updated at the conclusion of a tournament or when the player's participation has ended.

=== Singles ===
This table is current through the 2020 Australian Open.

Tournament	2009	2010	2011	2012	2013	2014	2015	2016	2017	2018	2019	2020	SR	W–L	Win%
Grand Slam tournaments
Australian Open	A	Q1	A	Q1	A	A	Q1	1R	A	A	A	A	0 / 1	0–1	0%
French Open	A	A	A	Q2	Q1	Q2	A	1R	A	A	A	A	0 / 1	0–1	0%
Wimbledon	A	Q1	A	2R	Q1	Q1	Q3	1R	Q1	A	A	NH	0 / 2	1–2	33%
US Open	Q2	A	A	Q2	A	Q1	Q2	1R	A	A	A	A	0 / 1	0–1	0%
Win–loss	0–0	0–0	0–0	1–1	0–0	0–0	0–0	0–4	0–0	0–0	0–0	0–0	0 / 5	1–5	17%
ATP World Tour Masters 1000
Indian Wells Masters	A	A	A	A	A	A	A	2R	A	A	A	NH	0 / 1	1–1	50%
Miami Open	A	A	A	A	A	A	A	2R	A	A	A	NH	0 / 1	1–1	50%
Monte-Carlo Masters	A	A	A	Q1	A	A	A	1R	A	A	A	NH	0 / 1	0–1	0%
Madrid Open	A	A	A	Q2	A	Q1	A	Q1	Q1	A	A	NH	0 / 0	0–0	0%
Italian Open	A	A	A	A	A	A	A	1R	A	A	A	A	0 / 1	0–1	0%
Shanghai Masters	A	A	A	A	A	A	A	Q2	A	A	A	NH	0 / 0	0–0	0%
Paris Masters	A	A	A	A	A	A	Q1	Q1	A	A	A	A	0 / 0	0–0	0%
Win–loss	0–0	0–0	0–0	0–0	0–0	0–0	0–0	2–4	0–0	0–0	0–0	0–0	0 / 4	2–4	33%

=== Doubles ===
Tournament	2016	2017	2018	2019	2020	2021	2022	2023	2024	2025	SR	W–L	Win %
Grand Slam tournaments
Australian Open	A	A	A	A	A	A	A	A	A	A	0 / 0	0–0	–
French Open	1R	A	A	A	A	A	A	A	A	A	0 / 1	0–1	0%
Wimbledon	1R	A	A	A	NH	A	A	A	A	A	0 / 1	0–1	0%
US Open	1R	A	A	A	A	A	A	A	A	A	0 / 1	0–1	0%
Win–loss	0–3	0–0	0–0	0–0	0–0	0–0	0–0	0–0	0–0	0–0	0 / 3	0–3	0%
ATP Masters 1000
Indian Wells Masters	A	A	A	A	NH	A	A	A	A	A	0 / 0	0–0	–
Miami Open	1R	A	A	A	NH	A	A	A	A	A	0 / 1	0–1	0%
Monte Carlo Masters	A	A	A	A	NH	A	A	A	A	A	0 / 0	0–0	–
Madrid Open	A	A	A	A	NH	A	A	A	A	A	0 / 0	0–0	–
Italian Open	A	A	A	A	A	A	A	A	A	A	0 / 0	0–0	–
Canadian Open	A	A	A	A	NH	A	A	A	A	A	0 / 0	0–0	–
Cincinnati Masters	A	A	A	A	A	A	A	A	A	A	0 / 0	0–0	–
Shanghai Masters	A	A	A	A	NH			A	A	A	0 / 0	0–0	–
Paris Masters	A	A	A	A	A	A	A	A	A	2R	0 / 1	0–1	0%
Win–loss	0–1	0–0	0–0	0–0	0–0	0–0	0–0	0–0	0–0	0–1	0 / 2	0–2	0%

== ATP Challenger and ITF Tour Finals ==
=== Singles 22 (12–10) ===
Legend (singles) ATP Challenger Tour (6–6) ITF Futures Tour (6–4)	Finals by surface Hard (0–1) Clay (12–9)

Result	W–L	Date	Tournament	Tier	Surface	Opponent	Score
Win	1–0	Jun 2008	Spain F23	Futures	Clay	(Spain) David Canudas-Fernandez	6–4, 4–6, 6–4
Loss	1–1	Jul 2008	Spain F26	Futures	Clay	(Spain) Sergio Gutiérrez Ferrol	4–6, 5–7
Win	2–1	Jul 2008	Spain F27	Futures	Clay	(Spain) Roberto Bautista Agut	4–6, 7–5, 6–1
Loss	2–2	Oct 2008	Spain F40	Futures	Clay	(Croatia) Antonio Šančić	6–7^{(5–7)}, 3–6
Loss	2–3	Nov 2008	Spain F43	Futures	Clay	(Italy) Andrea Arnaboldi	6–3, 3-6 5–7
Win	3–3	Jan 2009	Spain F1	Futures	Clay	(Spain) Javier Genaro-Martinez	6–2, 6–3
Win	4–3	Jul 2009	Saransk, Russia	Challenger	Clay	(France) Jonathan Dasnières de Veigy	7–5, 6–4
Win	5–3	May 2010	Spain F16	Futures	Clay	(Spain) Andoni Vivanco-Guzmán	6–4, 7–5
Loss	5–4	Jul 2010	Estonia F1	Futures	Clay	(Spain) Pablo Santos	6–7^{(5–7)}, 7–5, 3–6
Win	6–4	Jun 2011	Netherlands F2	Futures	Clay	(Belgium) Maxime Authom	6–3, 4–6, 6–0
Win	7–4	Sep 2011	Trnava, Slovakia	Challenger	Clay	(Slovakia) Pavol Červenák	6–4, 7–6^{(7–3)}
Loss	7–5	Sep 2012	Szczecin, Poland	Challenger	Clay	(Romania) Victor Hănescu	4–6, 5–7
Win	8–5	Apr 2014	Croatia F7	Futures	Clay	(Italy) Matteo Trevisan	5–7, 7–5, 6–1
Loss	8–6	Jun 2014	Fürth, Germany	Challenger	Clay	(Germany) Tobias Kamke	3–6, 2–6
Win	9–6	May 2015	Ostrava, Czech Republic	Challenger	Clay	(Czech Republic) Adam Pavlásek	7–6^{(7–5)}, 6–4
Loss	9–7	May 2015	Eskişehir, Turkey	Challenger	Hard	(Italy) Paolo Lorenzi	6–7^{(4–7)}, 6–7^{(5–7)}
Win	10–7	May 2015	Vicenza, Italy	Challenger	Clay	(Australia) John Millman	6–4, 6–2
Win	11–7	Jul 2015	Marburg, Germany	Challenger	Clay	(Germany) Nils Langer	2–6, 7–6^{(7–3)}, 6–3
Loss	11–8	Nov 2015	Montevideo, Uruguay	Challenger	Clay	(Argentina) Guido Pella	5–7, 6–2, 4–6
Win	12–8	Nov 2015	Challenger Finals, Brazil	Challenger	Clay	(Spain) Daniel Muñoz de la Nava	6–2, 3–6, 7–6^{(7–4)}
Loss	12–9	Jul 2016	Braunschweig, Germany	Challenger	Clay	(Brazil) Thomaz Bellucci	1–6, 6–1, 3–6
Loss	12–10	Sep 2017	Seville, Spain	Challenger	Clay	(Canada) Félix Auger-Aliassime	7–6^{(7–4)}, 3–6, 3–6

=== Doubles 45 (25–20) ===
Legend (doubles) ATP Challenger Tour (13–13) ITF Futures Tour (12–7)	Finals by surface Hard (1–4) Clay (24–16)

Result	W–L	Date	Tournament	Tier	Surface	Partner	Opponents	Score
Loss	0–1	May 2008	Spain F18	Futures	Clay	(Spain) David Díaz-Ventura	(Belgium) Bart Govaerts (Spain) Carlos Rexach-Itoiz	walkover
Loss	0–2	Jul 2008	Spain F27	Futures	Clay	(Spain) Gerard Granollers Pujol	(Netherlands) Stephan Fransen (Netherlands) Romano Frantzen	6–7^{(2–7)}, 3–6
Win	1–2	Aug 2008	Spain F31	Futures	Clay	(Spain) Gerard Granollers Pujol	(France) Thomas Cazes-Carrère (France) Romain Jouan	6–7^{(5–7)}, 7–6^{(7–5)}, [10–6]
Win	2–2	Oct 2008	Spain F39	Futures	Clay	(Spain) Gerard Granollers Pujol	(Spain) David Ollivier-Baquero (Spain) Carlos Rexach-Itoiz	7–5, 3–6, [10–7]
Win	3–2	Jan 2009	Spain F1	Futures	Clay	(Spain) Gerard Granollers Pujol	(Jamaica) Dustin Brown (Germany) Peter Steinberger	6–3, 7–5
Win	4–2	May 2011	Spain F14	Futures	Clay	(Spain) Miguel Ángel López Jaén	(Australia) Allen Perel (Spain) Gabriel Trujillo Soler	4–6, 6–2, [10–3]
Win	5–2	Jun 2011	Netherlands F2	Futures	Clay	(Argentina) Pablo Galdón	(Finland) Timo Nieminen (Finland) Juho Paukku	6–0, 7–6^{(7–3)}
Win	6–2	Mar 2012	Rabat, Morocco	Challenger	Clay	(Argentina) Federico Delbonis	(Slovenia) Martin Kližan (France) Stéphane Robert	6–7^{(3–7)}, 6–3, [10–5]
Loss	6–3	Mar 2012	Marrakech, Morocco	Challenger	Clay	(Argentina) Federico Delbonis	(Slovenia) Martin Kližan (Spain) Daniel Muñoz de la Nava	3–6, 6–1, [10–12]
Win	7–3	Aug 2014	Vicenza, Italy	Challenger	Clay	(Spain) Juan Lizariturry	(Chinese Taipei) Lee Hsin-han (United States) Vahid Mirzadeh	7–5, 3–6, [10–8]
Loss	7–4	Mar 2015	Egypt F9	Futures	Hard	(Netherlands) Mark Vervoort	(Poland) Karol Drzewiecki (Poland) Maciej Smoła	3–6, 6–4, [4–10]
Loss	7–5	Jun 2015	Fürth, Germany	Challenger	Clay	(Argentina) Renzo Olivo	(Argentina) Guillermo Durán (Argentina) Horacio Zeballos	1–6, 3–6
Loss	7–6	Sep 2015	Rome, Italy	Challenger	Clay	(Netherlands) Mark Vervoort	(Poland) Tomasz Bednarek (Poland) Mateusz Kowalczyk	2–6, 1–6
Win	8–6	Oct 2015	Mohammedia, Morocco	Challenger	Clay	(Netherlands) Mark Vervoort	(Spain) Roberto Carballés Baena (Spain) Pablo Carreño Busta	3–6, 7–6^{(7–2)}, [12–10]
Win	9–6	Sep 2016	Seville, Spain	Challenger	Clay	(Spain) Oriol Roca Batalla	(Uruguay) Ariel Behar (Spain) Enrique López Pérez	6–2, 6–5 ret.
Win	10–6	Aug 2017	Spain F27	Futures	Clay	(Spain) Daniel Gimeno Traver	(Spain) Alejandro Davidovich Fokina (Benin) Alexis Klégou	4–6, 7–5, [10–6]
Win	11–6	Sep 2017	Seville, Spain	Challenger	Clay	(Argentina) Pedro Cachin	(Russia) Ivan Gakhov (Spain) David Vega Hernández	7–6^{(7–5)}, 3–6, [10–5]
Win	12–6	Oct 2019	M25 Riba-roja de Túria, Spain	World Tennis Tour	Clay	(Spain) Oriol Roca Batalla	(Argentina) Nicolás Alberto Arreche (Argentina) Franco Feitt	6–2, 6–1
Win	13–6	Mar 2020	M25 Murcia, Spain	World Tennis Tour	Clay	(Spain) Oriol Roca Batalla	(Spain) Sergio Martos Gornés (Spain) David Pérez Sanz	7–6^{(7–3)}, 6–3
Abandoned	13–6	Mar 2020	M15 Antalya, Turkey	World Tennis Tour	Clay	(Spain) Oriol Roca Batalla	(Germany) Peter Heller (Germany) Peter Torebko	cancelled due to pandemic
Loss	13–7	Oct 2020	Alicante, Spain	Challenger	Clay	(Spain) Oriol Roca Batalla	(France) Enzo Couacaud (France) Albano Olivetti	6–4, 4–6, [2–10]
Win	14–7	Nov 2020	Lima, Peru	Challenger	Clay	(Spain) Oriol Roca Batalla	(United States) Collin Altamirano (Ukraine) Vitaliy Sachko	6–3, 6-4
Loss	14–8	Nov 2020	M15 Madrid, Spain	World Tennis Tour	Clay	(Spain) Oriol Roca Batalla	(Argentina) Facundo Díaz Acosta (Mexico) Gerardo López Villaseñor	6–7^{(4–7)}, 6–2, [6–10]
Loss	14–9	Feb 2021	M25 Villena, Spain	World Tennis Tour	Hard	(Netherlands) Mark Vervoort	(France) Dan Added (India) Arjun Kadhe	4–6, 2–6
Win	15–9	Apr 2022	Murcia, Spain	Challenger	Clay	(Spain) Oriol Roca Batalla	(Argentina) Pedro Cachin (Uruguay) Martín Cuevas	6–7^{(4–7)}, 7–6^{(7–4)}, [10–7]
Win	16–9	Jun 2022	M25 La Nucia, Spain	World Tennis Tour	Clay	(Spain) Oriol Roca Batalla	(Spain) Álvaro López San Martín (Spain) Alex Marti Pujolras	6–2, 2–6, [13–11]
Win	17–9	Jul 2022	Troyes, France	Challenger	Clay	(Spain) Oriol Roca Batalla	(Argentina) Thiago Agustín Tirante (Argentina) Juan Bautista Torres	6-1, 6-2
Win	18–9	Aug 2022	M25 Santander, Spain	World Tennis Tour	Clay	(Spain) Sergi Pérez Contri	(France) Titouan Droguet (France) Grégoire Jacq	6–3, 6–4
Win	19–9	Sep 2022	M25 Oviedo, Spain	World Tennis Tour	Clay	(Spain) Oriol Roca Batalla	(Spain) Álvaro López San Martín (Spain) Carlos Sánchez Jover	6–2, 6–2
Win	20–9	Mar 2023	M25 Torello, Spain	World Tennis Tour	Clay	(Spain) Oriol Roca Batalla	(Spain) John Echeverria (Spain) Alejandro Moro Cañas	7–5, 6–4
Loss	20–10	Mar 2023	Girona, Spain	Challenger	Clay	(Spain) Oriol Roca Batalla	(India) Yuki Bhambri (India) Saketh Myneni	4–6, 4–6
Loss	20–11	May 2023	M25 Sabadell, Spain	World Tennis Tour	Clay	(Spain) Oriol Roca Batalla	(France) Sascha Gueymard Wayenburg (France) Grégoire Jacq	4–6, 3–6
Win	21–11	Jun 2023	Troisdorf, Germany	Challenger	Clay	(Spain) Oriol Roca Batalla	(France) Manuel Guinard (France) Grégoire Jacq	6–2, 7–6^{(7–1)}
Loss	21–12	May 2024	M25 La Nucia, Spain	World Tennis Tour	Clay	(Spain) Sergi Pérez Contri	(India) Siddhant Banthia (Ukraine) Eric Vanshelboim	5–7, 6–7^{(6–8)}
Win	22–12	Jul 2024	Tampere, Finland	Challenger	Clay	(Spain) Daniel Rincón	(Australia) Thomas Fancutt (Denmark) Johannes Ingildsen	6–3, 6–4
Loss	22–13	Sep 2024	Villena, Spain	Challenger	Clay	(Monaco) Romain Arneodo	(India) Anirudh Chandrasekar (India) Niki Kaliyanda Poonacha	6–7^{(2–7)}, 4–6
Loss	22–14	Oct 2024	Olbia, Italy	Challenger	Clay	(Austria) David Pichler	(Ukraine) Oleksii Krutykh (Ukraine) Vitaliy Sachko	6–4, 1–6, [5–10]
Loss	22–15	Jan 2025	Oeiras, Portugal	Challenger	Hard (i)	(Netherlands) Mick Veldheer	(Croatia) Mili Poljičak (Serbia) Matej Sabanov	0–6, 1–6
Win	23–15	Feb 2025	Tenerife, Spain	Challenger	Hard	(Spain) Daniel Rincón	(Spain) Nicolás Álvarez Varona (Spain) Iñaki Montes de la Torre	6–2, 6–4
Loss	23–16	Oct 2025	Valencia, Spain	Challenger	Clay	(Israel) Daniel Cukierman	(Brazil) Marcelo Demoliner (Brazil) Orlando Luz	3–6, 6–3, [5–10]
Loss	23–17	Jun 2026	Brașov, Romania	Challenger	Clay	(Ukraine) Denys Molchanov	(Austria) Maximilian Neuchrist (Czech Republic) Michael Vrbenský	3–6, 6–3, [4–10]
Win	24–17	Jul 2026	Liberec, Czech Republic	Challenger	Clay	(Ukraine) Denys Molchanov	(Austria) Maximilian Neuchrist (Czech Republic) David Poljak	7–6^{(9–7)}, 6–3
Loss	24–18	Aug 2026	Grodzisk Mazowiecki, Poland	Challenger	Hard	(Ukraine) Denys Molchanov	(Morocco) Younes Lalami (Poland) Filip Pieczonka	0–6, 4–6
Loss	24–19	Sep 2026	Sevilla, Spain	Challenger	Clay	(Ukraine) Denys Molchanov	(Colombia) Nicolás Barrientos (Argentina) Mariano Kestelboim	6–7^{(3–7)}, 3–6
Loss	24–20	Sep 2026	Szczecin, Poland	Challenger	Clay	(Ukraine) Denys Molchanov	(Czech Republic) Andrew Paulson (Portugal) Tiago Pereira	2–6, 0–6
Win	25–20	Sep 2026	Genoa, Italy	Challenger	Clay	(Ukraine) Denys Molchanov	(Finland) Patrik Niklas-Salminen (Czech Republic) Michael Vrbenský	6–2, 6–7^{(6–8)}, [10–7]
