= Daniel Rincón (tennis) =

Spanish tennis player (born 2003)

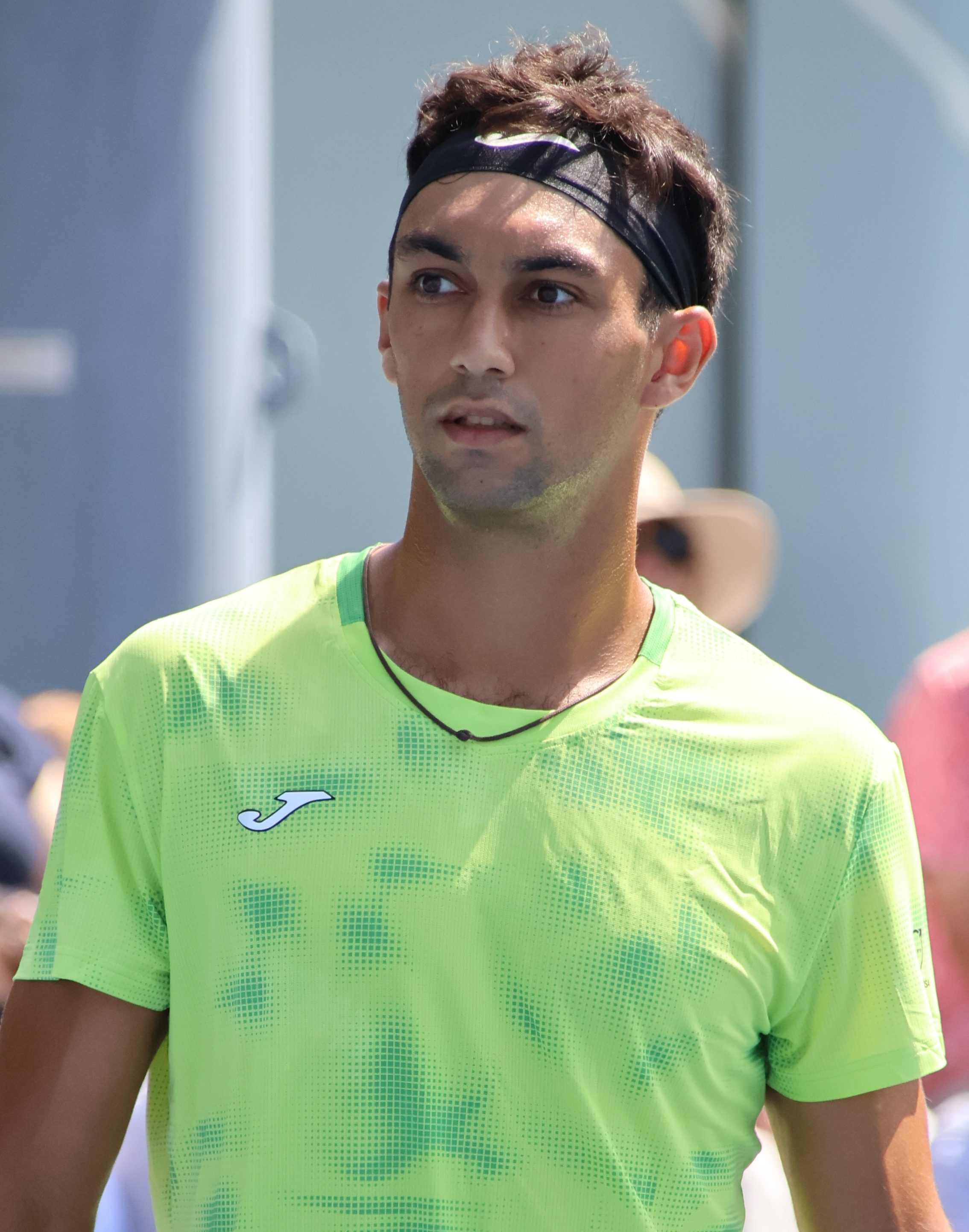
- Rincón at the 2026 US Open
- Full name: Daniel Rincón Yagüe
- Country (sports): Spain
- Residence: Madrid, Spain
- Born: 7 January 2003 (age 23) Ávila, Spain
- Height: 1.85 m (6 ft 1 in)
- Plays: Left-handed (two-handed backhand)
- Coach: Jorge Hernando
- Prize money: US $566,459

Singles
- Career record: 0–3 (at ATP Tour level, Grand Slam level, and in Davis Cup)
- Career titles: 2 Challenger, 5 ITF
- Highest ranking: No. 181 (4 December 2023)
- Current ranking: No. 208 (31 August 2026)

Grand Slam singles results
- Australian Open: Q1 (2024)
- French Open: Q3 (2024)
- Wimbledon: Q1 (2024, 2025)
- US Open: Q3 (2026)

Doubles
- Career record: 1–3 (at ATP Tour level, Grand Slam level, and in Davis Cup)
- Career titles: 5 Challenger, 5 ITF
- Highest ranking: No. 148 (30 September 2024)
- Current ranking: No. 346 (31 August 2026)
- Last updated on: 31 August 2026.

Daniel Rincón Yagüe (born 7 January 2003) is a Spanish tennis player. He has a career high ATP singles ranking of world No. 181 achieved on 4 December 2023 and a career high doubles ranking of No. 148 achieved on 30 September 2024. He has won two ATP Challenger Tour singles and five doubles titles.

== Career ==
=== Juniors ===
Rincón won the 2021 US Open boys' singles title, defeating Shang Juncheng in the final. He also reached the 2021 Wimbledon Boys' Doubles final alongside Abedallah Shelbayh, but was defeated by Edas Butvilas and Alejandro Manzanera Pertusa.

=== 2023-2024: Maiden Challenger title, ATP singles debut ===
Rincón won his first ATP Challenger doubles title at the 2023 Murcia Open, partnering Abedallah Shelbayh after they received entry into the draw as alternates.

He made his ATP Tour debut in Barcelona as a wildcard and lost to Jason Kubler. He qualified for the main draw at the 2023 Geneva Open but lost in the first round to Roberto Carballés Baena in three sets.

Rincón received a wildcard for the 2024 Barcelona Open Banc Sabadell but lost to Facundo Díaz Acosta. He won his first Challenger singles title at the 2024 Tampere Open, defeating Calvin Hemery in the final.

== Junior Grand Slam finals ==
=== Singles: 1 (1 title) ===
Result	Year	Tournament	Surface	Opponent	Score
Win	2021	US Open	Hard	(China) Shang Juncheng	6–2, 7–6^{(8–6)}

=== Doubles: 1 (1 runner-up) ===
Result	Year	Tournament	Surface	Partner	Opponents	Score
Loss	2021	Wimbledon	Grass	(Jordan) Abedallah Shelbayh	(Lithuania) Edas Butvilas (Spain) Alejandro Manzanera Pertusa	3–6, 4–6

== ATP Challenger and ITF Tour finals ==
=== Singles: 12 (8–4) ===
Legend (singles) ATP Challenger Tour (2–0) Futures/ITF World Tennis Tour (6–4)	Finals by surface Hard (3–4) Clay (5–0) Grass (0–0)

Result	W–L	Date	Tournament	Tier	Surface	Opponent	Score
Win	1–0	Jun 2022	M15 Alkmaar, Netherlands	World Tennis Tour	Clay	(Italy) Jacopo Berrettini	7–5, 6–1
Win	2–0	Jul 2022	M25 Den Haag, Netherlands	World Tennis Tour	Clay	(Netherlands) Jelle Sels	7–6^{(8–6)}, 4–6, 6–1
Loss	2–1	Jul 2022	M15 Monastir, Tunisia	World Tennis Tour	Hard	(Jordan) Abedallah Shelbayh	1–2 ret.
Loss	2–2	Dec 2022	M25 Trnava, Slovakia	World Tennis Tour	Hard (i)	(Czech Republic) Marek Gengel	7–6^{(8–6)}, 3–6, 3–6
Loss	2–3	Dec 2022	M15 Trnava, Slovakia	World Tennis Tour	Hard (i)	(Jordan) Abedallah Shelbayh	1–6, 4–6
Loss	2–4	Jan 2023	M15 Manacor, Spain	World Tennis Tour	Hard	(Spain) Álvaro López San Martín	4–6, 6–3, 5–7
Win	3–4	Jan 2023	M25 Manacor, Spain	World Tennis Tour	Hard	(United Kingdom) Felix Gill	6–3, 6–3
Win	4–4	Jan 2023	M25 Manacor, Spain	World Tennis Tour	Hard	(Jordan) Abedallah Shelbayh	7–6^{(7–0)}, 3–6, 7–6^{(11–9)}
Win	5–4	Jul 2024	Tampere, Finland	Challenger	Clay	(France) Calvin Hemery	6–1, 7–6^{[7-4]}
Win	6–4	Oct 2024	M25 Santa Margherita di Pula, Italy	World Tennis Tour	Clay	(Germany) Diego Dedura-Palomero	6–2, 6–7^{(5–7)}, 6–3
Win	7–4	Aug 2025	Manacor, Spain	Challenger	Hard	(Austria) Jurij Rodionov	7–6^{[7-3]}, 6–2
Win	8–4	May 2026	M25 Vic, Spain	World Tennis Tour	Clay	(Spain) Sergi Perez Contri	6–1, 3–6, 6–3

=== Doubles: 15 (10–5) ===
Legend (doubles) ATP Challenger Tour (5–3) Futures/ITF World Tennis Tour (5–2)	Finals by surface Hard (5–1) Clay (5–4) Grass (0–0)

Result	W–L	Date	Tournament	Tier	Surface	Partner	Opponents	Score
Win	1–0	May 2022	M15, Valldoreix, Spain	World Tennis Tour	Clay	(Spain) Alvaro Lopez San Martin	(Argentina) Franco Emanuel Egea (Syria) Hazem Naw	6–3, 6–2
Loss	1–1	May 2022	M15, Antalya, Turkey	World Tennis Tour	Clay	(Uruguay) Ignacio Carou	(Italy) Federico Arnaboldi (Italy) Gianmarco Ferrari	7–5, 2–6, [6–10]
Loss	1–2	Dec 2022	M25, Trnava, Slovakia	World Tennis Tour	Hard (i)	(Paraguay) Daniel Vallejo	(Netherlands) Mats Hermans (Netherlands) Mick Veldheer	6–1, 3–6, [8–10]
Win	2–2	Dec 2022	M15, Trnava, Slovakia	World Tennis Tour	Hard (i)	(Paraguay) Daniel Vallejo	(Jordan) Abedallah Shelbayh (Hong Kong) Coleman Wong	6–4, 6–2
Win	3–2	Jan 2023	M15, Manacor, Spain	World Tennis Tour	Hard	(Paraguay) Daniel Vallejo	Svyatoslav Gulin (Moldova) Ilya Snițari	6–4, 7–6^{(7–5)}
Win	4–2	Apr 2023	Murcia, Spain	Challenger	Clay	(Jordan) Abedallah Shelbayh	(Spain) Sergio Martos Gornés (Italy) Marco Bortolotti	7–6^{(7–3)}, 6–4
Loss	4–3	Jul 2023	Troyes, France	Challenger	Clay	(Spain) Álvaro López San Martín	(France) Manuel Guinard (France) Grégoire Jacq	walkover
Loss	4–4	Nov 2023	Valencia, Spain	Challenger	Clay	(Spain) Oriol Roca Batalla	(Italy) Andrea Pellegrino (Italy) Andrea Vavassori	2–6, 4–6
Win	5–4	Jan 2024	Canberra, Australia	Challenger	Hard	(Jordan) Abedallah Shelbayh	(Sweden) André Göransson (France) Albano Olivetti	7–6^{(7–4)}, 6–3
Win	6–4	Apr 2024	Barcelona, Spain	Challenger	Clay	(Spain) Oriol Roca Batalla	(Germany) Jakob Schnaitter (Germany) Mark Wallner	5–7, 6–4, [11–9]
Win	7–4	Apr 2024	M25, Sabadell, Spain	World Tennis Tour	Clay	(Spain) Alejandro Turrizani Álvarez	(Spain) David Pérez Sanz (Ukraine) Eric Vanshelboim	6–4, 6–4
Win	8–4	Jul 2024	Tampere, Finland	Challenger	Clay	(Spain) Íñigo Cervantes	(Australia) Thomas Fancutt (Denmark) Johannes Ingildsen	6–3, 6–4
Loss	8–5	Nov 2024	Montemar, Spain	Challenger	Clay	(Jordan) Abedallah Shelbayh	(Poland) Karol Drzewiecki (Poland) Piotr Matuszewski	3–6, 4–6
Win	9–5	Feb 2025	Tenerife, Spain	Challenger	Hard	(Spain) Íñigo Cervantes	(Spain) Nicolás Álvarez Varona (Spain) Iñaki Montes de la Torre	6–2, 6–4
Win	10–5	Jan 2026	M15, Manacor, Spain	World Tennis Tour	Hard	(Russia) Yaroslav Demin	(Republic of Ireland) Conor Gannon (United Kingdom) Joe Leather	6–3, 6–3
