= Oleksii Krutykh =

Ukrainian tennis player

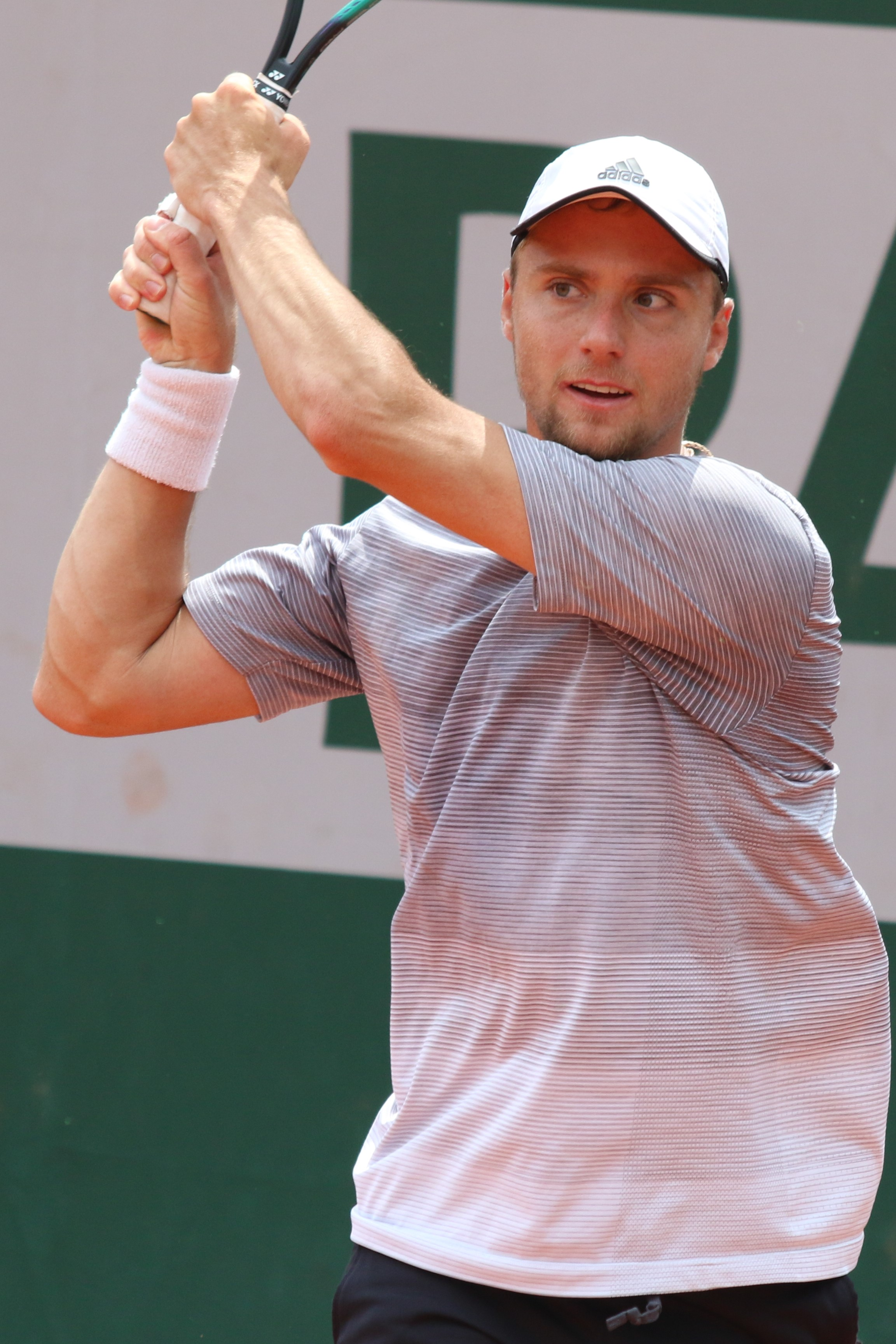
- Krutykh at the 2023 French Open
- Country (sports): Ukraine
- Residence: Kyiv, Ukraine
- Born: 10 March 2000 (age 26) Kyiv, Ukraine
- Height: 1.85 m (6 ft 1 in)
- Plays: Right-handed (two-handed backhand)
- Prize money: $341,259

Singles
- Career record: 4–6
- Career titles: 0
- Highest ranking: No. 160 (27 February 2023)
- Current ranking: No. 551 (20 July 2026)

Grand Slam singles results
- Australian Open: 1R (2023)
- French Open: Q2 (2023)
- Wimbledon: Q1 (2023)
- US Open: Q1 (2023)

Doubles
- Career record: 1–0
- Career titles: 0
- Highest ranking: No. 275 (5 December 2022)
- Current ranking: No. 1,002 (20 July 2026)
- Last updated on: 20 July 2026.

Oleksii Krutykh (born 10 March 2000) is a Ukrainian tennis player. He has a career high ATP singles ranking of World No. 160 achieved on 27 February 2023. He also has a career high doubles ranking of No. 275 achieved on 5 December 2022. He has won two ATP Challenger singles titles and two doubles titles.

== Career ==
=== 2022: Two Challenger titles, top 200 debut ===
In August, Krutych won his first Challenger title at the 2022 IBG Prague Open defeating German Lucas Gerch and becoming the youngest Ukrainian champion on the Challenger Tour since Alexandr Dolgpolov won the Meknes Challenger in 2010 and the first Ukrainian to win a Challenger title in the season. He rose to a career-high No. 226 on 29 August 2022.

He reached the top 200 in singles at world No. 190 climbing more than 60 positions up on 28 November 2022 after winning his second Challenger for the season and in his career in Valencia. At the same tournament he also won the doubles event climbing to a new career-high ranking of No. 276 in the top 300 in doubles.

=== 2023: Grand Slam and ATP debuts ===
In January, Krutych qualified for the 2023 Australian Open to make his Grand Slam debut defeating Denis Kudla.

He made his ATP main draw debut in Doha but lost to fellow qualifier Liam Broady. At the 2023 Barcelona Open Banc Sabadell he qualified for his first ATP 500 tournament main draw.

== ATP Challenger and ITF Tour Finals ==
=== Singles: 15 (7–8) ===
Legend (singles) ATP Challenger Tour (2–0) ITF Futures/World Tennis Tour (5–8)	Titles by surface Hard (0–1) Clay (7–7) Grass (0–0) Carpet (0–0)

Result	W–L	Date	Tournament	Tier	Surface	Opponent	Score
Loss	0–1	Sep 2018	Ukraine F4, Bucha	Futures	Clay	(Italy) Alessandro Petrone	4–6, 3–6
Loss	0–2	Sep 2019	M15 Brașov, Romania	World Tennis Tour	Clay	(Romania) David Ionel	5–7, 4–6
Loss	0–3	Sep 2020	M15 Novomoskovsk, Ukraine	World Tennis Tour	Clay	(Russia) Bogdan Bobrov	3–6, 3–6
Loss	0–4	Feb 2021	M15 Antalya, Turkey	World Tennis Tour	Clay	(Italy) Raúl Brancaccio	4–6, 4–6
Win	1–4	May 2021	M15 Novomoskovsk, Ukraine	World Tennis Tour	Clay	(Spain) Jose Fco. Vidal Azorin	7–6^{(7–3)}, 7–5
Loss	1–5	Mar 2022	M25 Antalya, Turkey	World Tennis Tour	Clay	(Bosnia and Herzegovina) Nerman Fatić	6–7^{(4–7)}, 4–6
Win	2–5	Mar 2022	M25 Antalya, Turkey	World Tennis Tour	Clay	(United Kingdom) Billy Harris	6–4, 4–6, 6–2
Win	3–5	Aug 2022	Prague, Czech Republic	Challenger	Clay	(Germany) Lucas Gerch	6–3, 6–7^{(2–7)}, 6–2
Win	4–5	Nov 2022	Valencia, Spain	Challenger	Clay	(France) Luca Van Assche	6–2, 6–0
Loss	4–6	Mar 2022	M15 Heraklion, Greece	World Tennis Tour	Hard	(Colombia) Adrià Soriano Barrera	5–7, 7–5, 3–6
Loss	4–7	Dec 2024	M15 Antalya, Turkey	World Tennis Tour	Clay	Svyatoslav Gulin	6–7^{(3–7)}, 4–6
Win	5–7	Apr 2025	M25 Antalya, Turkey	World Tennis Tour	Clay	(Uzbekistan) Sergey Fomin	7–6^{(7–4)}, 3–6, 7–5
Loss	5–8	Apr 2025	M15 Antalya, Turkey	World Tennis Tour	Clay	(Slovakia) Alex Molcan	1–6, 6–3, 4–6
Win	6–8	Jun 2026	M25 Ceska Lipa, Czech Republic	World Tennis Tour	Clay	(Ukraine) Georgii Kravchenko	6–2, 6–4
Win	7–8	Jun 2026	M15 Kamen, Germany	World Tennis Tour	Clay	(Germany) Benito Sanchez Martinez	6–1, 6–3

=== Doubles ===
Result	Date	Category	Tournament	Surface	Partner	Opponents	Score
Win	11 December 2021	Challenger	Antalya, Turkey	Clay	(Chinese Taipei) Hsu Yu-hsiou	(Uzbekistan) Sanjar Fayziev (Greece) Markos Kalovelonis	6–1, 7–6^{(7–5)}
Win	26 November 2022	Challenger	Valencia, Spain	Hard	(Spain) Oriol Roca Batalla	(Serbia) Ivan Sabanov (Serbia) Matej Sabanov	6–3, 7–6^{(7–3)}
