= Copa Faulconbridge =

Tennis tournament in Spain

- 2026 Copa Faulconbridge

ATP Challenger Tour
- Event name: Copa Faulconbridge by Marcos Automoción
- Founded: 1933; 93 years ago
- Location: Valencia, Spain
- Venue: Valencia Tennis Club
- Category: ATP Challenger 175 (2026-), Challenger 125 (2024-2025)
- Surface: Clay
- Prize money: €272,272 (2026), €181,250 (2025)
- Website: copafbvalencia.com

The Copa Faulconbridge by Marcos Automoción (previously the Copa Faulcombridge) is a professional tennis tournament played on clay courts. It is part of the ATP Challenger Tour and is held in Valencia, Spain. In 2026 it was upgraded to a Challenger 175.

The event is named after Alfred Faulconbridge (1864–1932), founder of what today is the Valencia Tennis Club.

== Past finals ==
=== Singles ===
Year	Champion	Runner-up	Score
1933	(Spain) Jerónimo Villota		
1934	(Spain) José Albiol		
1935	(Spain) Francisco Suqué		
1936–1939	Not held due to the Spanish Civil War		
1940	(Spain) Pedro Alapont		
1941	(Spain) José Albiol (2)		
1942	(Spain) José Albiol (3)		
1943	(Spain) Jaime Bartrolí		
1944	(Spain) Jaime Bartrolí (2)		
1945	(Italy) Francesco Romanoni		
1946	(Spain) Pedro Masip		
1947	(Spain) José Albiol (4)		
1948	(Spain) Luis Carles		
1949	(Spain) Armando Casas		
1950	(Switzerland) Vladimír Černík		
1951	(Italy) Giuseppe Merlo		
1952	(Poland) Władysław Skonecki		
1953	(Sweden) Torsten Johansson		
1954	(Socialist Federal Republic of Yugoslavia) Milan Branović		
1955	(Socialist Federal Republic of Yugoslavia) Milan Branović (2)		
1956	(United States) Ham Richardson		
1957	Not held due to the 1957 Valencia flood		
1958	(Italy) Antonio Maggi		
1959	(Spain) Andrés Gimeno		
1960	(Colombia) William Álvarez		
1961	(France) Pierre Darmon		
1962	(Brazil) José Edison Mandarino		
1963	(Spain) Manuel Santana		
1964	(Spain) Manuel Santana (2)		
1965	(Brazil) José Edison Mandarino (2)		
1966	(Spain) José Luis Arilla		
1967	(Chile) Ernesto Aguirre		
1968	(Spain) Manuel Santana (3)		
1969	(Spain) Manuel Santana (4)		
1970	Not held		
1971	(Spain) Manuel Orantes		
1972	(Spain) Andrés Gimeno (2)		
1973	Not held		
1974	(Spain) Manuel Orantes (2)		
1975	(Colombia) Jairo Velasco Sr.		
1976	(Spain) José Guerrero		
1977	(Spain) José Guerrero (2)		
1978	(Spain) Ernesto Vázquez		
1979	(Spain) Francisco Ferrer		
1980	Not held		
1981	(Spain) José García		
1982	(Spain) José Moreno		
1983	(Spain) Roberto Vizcaíno		
1984	(Spain) Gabriel Urpí		
1985	(Spain) Fernando Luna		
1986	(Spain) Fernando Luna (2)		
1987	(Spain) Emilio Sánchez		
1988	(Spain) Nicolás Romero		
1989	(Spain) Luis Riba		
1990	(Spain) David de Miguel		
1991	(Spain) José Francisco Altur		
1992	(Spain) Tati Rascón		
1993	(Spain) José Alejos		
1994	(Spain) Félix Mantilla		
1995	(Spain) Gonzalo Corrales		
1996	(Spain) José Francisco Altur (2)		
1997	(Spain) Ignacio Truyol		
1998	(Spain) Álex Calatrava		
1999	(Spain) José Alejos (2)		
2000	(Spain) Iván Gallego		
2001	Not held		
2002	(Spain) David Ferrer	(Argentina) Leonardo Olguín	6–4, 6-3
2003–2021	Not held		
2022	(Ukraine) Oleksii Krutykh	(France) Luca Van Assche	6–2, 6–0
2023	(Italy) Fabio Fognini	(Spain) Roberto Bautista Agut	3–6, 7–6^{(10–8)}, 7–6^{(7–3)}
2024	(Spain) Pedro Martínez	(Portugal) Jaime Faria	6–1, 6–2
2025	(United Kingdom) Jan Choinski	(Croatia) Luka Mikrut	4–6, 6–1, 6–2
2026	(Serbia) Miomir Kecmanović	(Paraguay) Daniel Vallejo	6–2, 3–6, 6–2

=== Doubles ===
Year	Champions	Runners-up	Score
2002	(Australia) Tim Crichton (Australia) Todd Perry	(Germany) Marcus Hilpert (South Africa) Shaun Rudman	Walkover
2003–2021	Not held		
2022	(Ukraine) Oleksii Krutykh (Spain) Oriol Roca Batalla	(Serbia) Ivan Sabanov (Serbia) Matej Sabanov	6–3, 7–6^{(7–3)}
2023	(Italy) Andrea Pellegrino (Italy) Andrea Vavassori	(Spain) Daniel Rincón (Spain) Oriol Roca Batalla	6–2, 6–4
2024	(Peru) Alexander Merino (Germany) Christoph Negritu	(Poland) Karol Drzewiecki (Poland) Piotr Matuszewski	6–3, 6–4
2025	(Brazil) Marcelo Demoliner (Brazil) Orlando Luz	(Spain) Íñigo Cervantes (Israel) Daniel Cukierman	6–3, 3–6, [10–5]
2026	(Germany) Constantin Frantzen (Netherlands) Robin Haase	(Netherlands) Sander Arends (Netherlands) David Pel	6–4, 6–7^{(5–7)}, [11–9]
