= 2009 Concurso Internacional de Tenis – San Sebastián – Singles =

San Sebastián – Singles
- 2009 Concurso Internacional de Tenis – San Sebastián

Final
- Champion: (Netherlands) Thiemo de Bakker
- Runner-up: (Serbia) Filip Krajinović
- Score: 6–2, 6–3

Events
Singles	Doubles
← 2008 ·	Concurso Internacional de Tenis – San Sebastián	· 2010 →

Pablo Andújar tried to defend his 2008 title; however, he was eliminated by Pedro Clar-Rosselló in the quarterfinal.
Thiemo de Bakker defeated Filip Krajinović 6–2, 6–3 in the final.

== Seeds ==
1. (Spain) Rubén Ramírez Hidalgo (second round)
2. (Spain) Santiago Ventura (second round)
3. (Spain) Pablo Andújar (quarterfinals)
4. (Algeria) Lamine Ouahab (first round)
5. (France) Olivier Patience (semifinals)
6. (Netherlands) Thiemo de Bakker (champion)
7. (Spain) David Marrero (quarterfinals)
8. (Spain) Pablo Santos (first round)

== Draw ==
=== Key ===
- Q = Qualifier
- WC = Wild card
- LL = Lucky loser
- Alt = Alternate
- SE = Special exempt
- PR = Protected ranking
- ITF = ITF entry
- JE = Junior exempt
- w/o = Walkover
- r = Retired
- d = Defaulted
- SR = Special ranking

=== Final four ===
Semifinals
WC	(Serbia) Filip Krajinović	6	3	6
5	(France) Olivier Patience	2	6	3
Q	(Spain) Pedro Clar-Rosselló	3	2
6	(Netherlands) Thiemo de Bakker	6	6

Final
WC	(Serbia) Filip Krajinović	2	3
6	(Netherlands) Thiemo de Bakker	6	6

=== Top half ===
First round
1	(Spain) R Ramírez Hidalgo	6	6
Q	(Poland) A Chadaj	3	2
WC	(France) J Eysseric	4	6^{3}
WC	(Serbia) F Krajinović	6	7
(France) R Jouan	4	2
(Brazil) A Ghem	6	6
WC	(Spain) A Vivanco-Guzmán	3	5
7	(Spain) D Marrero	6	7
4	(Algeria) L Ouahab	3	6	2
(Spain) A Ramos-Viñolas	6	4	6
(Russia) I Belyaev	4	6	1
(Spain) F Vicente	6	4	6
Q	(Spain) J Genaro-Martínez	7	6
(Hungary) Á Kellner	6^{2}	4
(Argentina) M Alund	4	0
5	(France) O Patience	6	6

Second round
1	(Spain) R Ramírez Hidalgo	1	5
WC	(Serbia) F Krajinović	6	7
(Brazil) A Ghem	6	0	2
7	(Spain) D Marrero	4	6	6
(Spain) A Ramos-Viñolas	2	6	6
(Spain) F Vicente	6	3	3
Q	(Spain) J Genaro-Martínez	1	2
5	(France) O Patience	6	6

Quarterfinals
WC	(Serbia) F Krajinović	0	6	6
7	(Spain) D Marrero	6	1	3
(Spain) A Ramos-Viñolas	4	0
5	(France) O Patience	6	6

Semifinals
WC	(Serbia) F Krajinović	6	3	6
5	(France) O Patience	2	6	3

=== Bottom half ===
First round
8	(Spain) P Santos	4	7	3
(Spain) G Olaso	6	6^{5}	6
(Italy) A Arnaboldi	4	3
Q	(Spain) P Clar-Rosselló	6	6
Q	(Argentina) F del Bonis	4	5
(Spain) G Trujillo-Soler	6	7
(Netherlands) R Sluiter	4	6	5
3	(Spain) P Andújar	6	4	7
6	(Netherlands) T de Bakker	6	6
(Spain) MÁ López Jaén	4	2
(Spain) R Bautista-Agut	1	4
(Serbia) B Pašanski	6	6
(Spain) J Checa-Calvo	6	6
WC	(Spain) J Martí	4	4
(Spain) I Cervantes-Huegun	2	6	3
2	(Spain) S Ventura	6	4	6

Second round
(Spain) G Olaso	6	3	5
Q	(Spain) P Clar-Rosselló	4	6	7
(Spain) G Trujillo-Soler	6	1	2
3	(Spain) P Andújar	2	6	6
6	(Netherlands) T de Bakker	6	6
(Serbia) B Pašanski	4	4
(Spain) J Checa-Calvo	6	6
2	(Spain) S Ventura	4	3

Quarterfinals
Q	(Spain) P Clar-Rosselló	6	6^{7}	6
3	(Spain) P Andújar	4	7	0
6	(Netherlands) T de Bakker	6^{4}	6	6
(Spain) J Checa-Calvo	7	0	3

Semifinals
Q	(Spain) P Clar-Rosselló	3	2
6	(Netherlands) T de Bakker	6	6
