= 2009 Concurso Internacional de Tenis – San Sebastián – Doubles =

San Sebastián – Doubles
- 2009 Concurso Internacional de Tenis – San Sebastián

Final
- Champions: (France) Jonathan Eysseric; (France) Romain Jouan
- Runners-up: (Spain) Pedro Clar Rosselló; (Spain) Albert Ramos Viñolas
- Score: 7–5, 6–3

Events
Singles	Doubles
← 2008 ·	Concurso Internacional de Tenis – San Sebastián	· 2010 →

Marc López and Gabriel Trujillo Soler were the defending champions, but López chose to not participate this year.
Trujillo Soler competed with Guillermo Olaso, but they were eliminated already in the first round.
Jonathan Eysseric and Romain Jouan won in the final 7–5, 6–3, against Pedro Clar Rosselló and Albert Ramos Viñolas.

== Seeds ==
1. (Spain) Pablo Andújar / (Spain) Santiago Ventura (semifinals)
2. (Spain) David Marrero / (Spain) Fernando Vicente (first round)
3. (Spain) Íñigo Cervantes Huegun / (Spain) Pablo Santos (quarterfinals)
4. (Argentina) Martín Alund / (Spain) Miguel Ángel López Jaén (quarterfinals)

== Draw ==
=== Key ===
- Q = Qualifier
- WC = Wild card
- LL = Lucky loser
- Alt = Alternate
- SE = Special exempt
- PR = Protected ranking
- ITF = ITF entry
- JE = Junior exempt
- w/o = Walkover
- r = Retired
- d = Defaulted
- SR = Special ranking

=== Draw ===
First round

Quarterfinals

Semifinals

Finals

1
- (Spain) P Andújar
- (Spain) S Ventura
6
6

- (Tunisia) M Jaziri
- (Algeria) L Ouahab
3
2

1
- (Spain) P Andújar
- (Spain) S Ventura
6
6

(Spain) J Checa Calvo
(Russia) N Nesterov
6
6

(Spain) J Checa Calvo
(Russia) N Nesterov
3
3

WC
(Spain) P Belloso-Ausín
(Spain) J Julia
3
2

1
- (Spain) P Andújar
- (Spain) S Ventura
3
2

4
- (Argentina) M Alund
- (Spain) MÁ López Jaén
6
3
[10]

- (France) J Eysseric
- (France) R Jouan
6
6

- (Italy) A Arnaboldi
- (Spain) I Coll-Riudavets
2
6
[8]

4
- (Argentina) M Alund
- (Spain) MÁ López Jaén
5
3

- (France) J Eysseric
- (France) R Jouan
6
6

- (France) J Eysseric
- (France) R Jouan
7
6

(Argentina) F Delbonis
(Spain) J Lizariturry
4
4

- (France) J Eysseric
- (France) R Jouan
7
6

- (France) J Blandin
- (Togo) K Loglo
6
6

- (Spain) P Clar Rosselló
- (Spain) A Ramos Viñolas
5
3

(Spain) J Genaro-Martínez
(Spain) S Gutiérrez Ferrol
1
2

- (France) J Blandin
- (Togo) K Loglo
6
6

- (Spain) G Olaso
- (Spain) G Trujillo Soler
4
6^{5}

3
- (Spain) I Cervantes Huegun
- (Spain) P Santos
3
2

3
- (Spain) I Cervantes Huegun
- (Spain) P Santos
6
7

- (France) J Blandin
- (Togo) K Loglo
6
4

WC
- (Spain) J Martí
- (Spain) A Vivanco-Guzmán
3
6
[10]

- (Spain) P Clar Rosselló
- (Spain) A Ramos Viñolas
1
6
[10]

- (Poland) A Chadaj
- (Serbia) B Pašanski
6
4
[1]

WC
- (Spain) J Martí
- (Spain) A Vivanco-Guzmán
5
1

- (Spain) P Clar Rosselló
- (Spain) A Ramos Viñolas
6
6

- (Spain) P Clar Rosselló
- (Spain) A Ramos Viñolas
7
6

2
- (Spain) D Marrero
- (Spain) F Vicente
3
4
