= 2010 Concurso Internacional de Tenis – San Sebastián – Doubles =

San Sebastián – Doubles
- 2010 Concurso Internacional de Tenis – San Sebastián

Final
- Champions: (Spain) Rubén Ramírez Hidalgo; (Spain) Santiago Ventura
- Runners-up: (United States) Brian Battistone; (Sweden) Andreas Siljeström
- Score: 6–4, 7–6(3)

Events
Singles	Doubles
← 2009 ·	Concurso Internacional de Tenis – San Sebastián	· 2011 →

Jonathan Eysseric and Romain Jouan were the defending champions, but chose not to compete.
Rubén Ramírez Hidalgo and Santiago Ventura won the title, defeating Brian Battistone and Andreas Siljeström 6–4, 7–6(3) in the final.

== Seeds ==
1. (Spain) Rubén Ramírez Hidalgo / (Spain) Santiago Ventura (champions)
2. (United States) James Cerretani / (Canada) Adil Shamasdin (quarterfinals)
3. (United States) Brian Battistone / (Sweden) Andreas Siljeström (finals)
4. (Switzerland) Yves Allegro / (Netherlands) Jesse Huta Galung (semifinals)

== Draw ==
=== Key ===
- Q = Qualifier
- WC = Wild card
- LL = Lucky loser
- Alt = Alternate
- SE = Special exempt
- PR = Protected ranking
- ITF = ITF entry
- JE = Junior exempt
- w/o = Walkover
- r = Retired
- d = Defaulted
- SR = Special ranking

=== Draw ===
First round

Quarterfinals

Semifinals

Finals

1
- (Spain) R Ramírez Hidalgo
- (Spain) S Ventura
7
7

- (Spain) P Carreño Busta
- (Spain) J Martí
5
5

1
- (Spain) R Ramírez Hidalgo
- (Spain) S Ventura

- (Spain) P Andújar
- (Spain) I Navarro
6
6

- (Spain) P Andújar
- (Spain) I Navarro
w/o

WC
- (Spain) J Julia
- (Spain) J Santo-Valdivieso
0
1

1
- (Spain) R Ramírez Hidalgo
- (Spain) S Ventura
7
7

4
- (Switzerland) Y Allegro
- (Netherlands) J Huta Galung
3

4
- (Switzerland) Y Allegro
- (Netherlands) J Huta Galung
5
6^{7}

- (France) T Cazes-Carrère
- (France) B Paire
1
r

4
- (Switzerland) Y Allegro
- (Netherlands) J Huta Galung
6
6

- (Spain) I Cervantes Huegun
- (Spain) J Lizariturry
6^{5}
2

- (Chile) J Aguilar
- (Argentina) M Alund
3
2

- (Chile) J Aguilar
- (Argentina) M Alund
7
6

1
- (Spain) R Ramírez Hidalgo
- (Spain) S Ventura
6
7

- (Spain) P Clar Rosselló
- (Spain) A Ramos Viñolas
3
6^{0}

3
- (United States) B Battistone
- (Sweden) A Siljeström
4
6^{3}

- (Argentina) J-M Aranguren
- (Spain) A Boje-Ordóñez
6
7

- (Argentina) J-M Aranguren
- (Spain) A Boje-Ordóñez
3
4

WC
- (Spain) D Marrero
- (Spain) D Vega
3
1

3
- (United States) B Battistone
- (Sweden) A Siljeström
6
6

3
- (United States) B Battistone
- (Sweden) A Siljeström
6
6

3
- (United States) B Battistone
- (Sweden) A Siljeström
6^{5}
7
[10]

WC
- (Spain) M Fornell-Mestres
- (Spain) A Vivanco-Guzmán
6
6

WC
- (Spain) M Fornell-Mestres
7
6^{3}
[4]

- (Spain) S Gutiérrez Ferrol
- (Spain) P Martín-Adalia
3
1

WC
- (Spain) M Fornell-Mestres
6
4
[10]

- (Spain) D de Miguel
- (Spain) P Riba
6
6^{2}
[5]

2
- (United States) J Cerretani
- (Canada) A Shamasdin
1
6
[2]

2
- (United States) J Cerretani
- (Canada) A Shamasdin
4
7
[10]
