= 2010 Concurso Internacional de Tenis – San Sebastián – Singles =

San Sebastián – Singles
- 2010 Concurso Internacional de Tenis – San Sebastián

Final
- Champion: (Spain) Albert Ramos-Viñolas
- Runner-up: (France) Benoît Paire
- Score: 6–4, 6–2

Events
Singles	Doubles
← 2009 ·	Concurso Internacional de Tenis – San Sebastián	· 2011 →

Thiemo de Bakker was the defending champion but chose to compete in Cincinnati Masters instead.
Albert Ramos-Viñolas won in the final defeating Benoît Paire 6–4, 6–2.

== Seeds ==
1. (Spain) Pere Riba (first round)
2. (Spain) Rubén Ramírez Hidalgo (semifinals)
3. (Spain) Pablo Andújar (first round)
4. (Germany) Julian Reister (semifinals)
5. (Spain) Santiago Ventura (second round)
6. (Kazakhstan) Yuri Schukin (first round, retired)
7. (Spain) Albert Ramos-Viñolas (champion)
8. (Germany) Denis Gremelmayr (second round, retired)

== Draw ==
=== Key ===
- Q = Qualifier
- WC = Wild card
- LL = Lucky loser
- Alt = Alternate
- SE = Special exempt
- PR = Protected ranking
- ITF = ITF entry
- JE = Junior exempt
- w/o = Walkover
- r = Retired
- d = Defaulted
- SR = Special ranking

=== Finals ===
Semifinals
(France) Benoît Paire	7	3	7
4	(Germany) Julian Reister	6^{6}	6	5
7	(Spain) Albert Ramos-Viñolas	6	4	6
2	(Spain) Rubén Ramírez Hidalgo	3	6	3

Final
(France) Benoît Paire	4	2
7	(Spain) Albert Ramos-Viñolas	6	6

=== Top half ===
First round
1	(Spain) P Riba	4	1
(Chile) J Aguilar	6	6
(Spain) G Trujillo-Soler	7	6
(Spain) I Navarro	5	3
(France) L Rochette	4	0
(France) B Paire	6	6
(Spain) I Cervantes-Huegun	4	6	1
6	(Kazakhstan) Y Schukin	6	4	0^{r}
4	(Germany) J Reister	6	6
(Spain) P Clar-Rosselló	4	3
Q	(Portugal) P Sousa	3	0
WC	(Spain) J Lizariturry	6	6
Q	(Italy) G Naso	7	6
(Spain) S Gutiérrez-Ferrol	5	1
Q	(Spain) M Fornell-Mestres	2	4
5	(Spain) S Ventura	6	6

Second round
(Chile) J Aguilar	4	7	6
(Spain) G Trujillo-Soler	6	6^{3}	3
(France) B Paire	6	5	7
(Spain) I Cervantes-Huegun	2	7	5
4	(Germany) J Reister	6	6
WC	(Spain) J Lizariturry	2	4
Q	(Italy) G Naso	4	6	6
5	(Spain) S Ventura	6	2	2

Quarterfinals
(Chile) J Aguilar	7	1	3
(France) B Paire	6^{5}	6	6
4	(Germany) J Reister	4	6	7
Q	(Italy) G Naso	6	3	6^{2}

Semifinals
(France) B Paire	7	3	7
4	(Germany) J Reister	6^{6}	6	5

=== Bottom half ===
First round
7	(Spain) A Ramos-Viñolas	5	6	6
WC	(Spain) J Martí	7	1	2
Q	(France) B Dupuy	6	4	6^{6}
(Morocco) R El Amrani	3	6	7
(Netherlands) T Schoorel	7	6
(France) O Patience	6^{7}	3
(France) J Dasnières de Veigy	6	6
3	(Spain) P Andújar	2	3
8	(Germany) D Gremelmayr	6	6
WC	(Spain) A Vivanco-Guzmán	0	2
WC	(Spain) P Carreño-Busta	2	4
(Netherlands) J Huta Galung	6	6
(Argentina) M Alund	6^{5}	7	6
(Spain) D Marrero	7	6^{4}	4
(Argentina) J-M Aranguren	7	5	3
2	(Spain) R Ramírez Hidalgo	6^{1}	7	6

Second round
7	(Spain) A Ramos-Viñolas	6	6
(Morocco) R El Amrani	3	2
(Netherlands) T Schoorel	7	3	6
(France) J Dasnières de Veigy	5	6	2
8	(Germany) D Gremelmayr	0	r
(Netherlands) J Huta Galung	3
(Argentina) M Alund	4	2
2	(Spain) R Ramírez Hidalgo	6	6

Quarterfinals
7	(Spain) A Ramos-Viñolas	6	6
(Netherlands) T Schoorel	3	2
(Netherlands) J Huta Galung	2	4
2	(Spain) R Ramírez Hidalgo	6	6

Semifinals
7	(Spain) A Ramos-Viñolas	6	4	6
2	(Spain) R Ramírez Hidalgo	3	6	3
