= 2011 Concurso Internacional de Tenis – San Sebastián – Doubles =

San Sebastián – Doubles
- 2011 Concurso Internacional de Tenis – San Sebastián

Final
- Champions: (Italy) Stefano Ianni; (Italy) Simone Vagnozzi
- Runners-up: (Spain) Daniel Gimeno Traver; (Spain) Israel Sevilla
- Score: 6–3, 6–4

Events
Singles	Doubles
← 2010 ·	Concurso Internacional de Tenis – San Sebastián	· 2012 →

Rubén Ramírez Hidalgo and Santiago Ventura were the defending champions but decided not to participate.
Stefano Ianni and Simone Vagnozzi won the title, defeating Daniel Gimeno Traver and Israel Sevilla 6–3, 6–4 in the final.

== Seeds ==
1. (Spain) Miguel Ángel López Jaén / (Spain) Pere Riba (quarterfinals)
2. (Chile) Jorge Aguilar / (Argentina) Martín Alund (quarterfinals)
3. (Italy) Stefano Ianni / (Italy) Simone Vagnozzi (champions)
4. (Spain) Guillermo Alcaide / (Spain) Carles Poch Gradin (first round, defaulted)

== Draw ==
=== Key ===
- Q = Qualifier
- WC = Wild card
- LL = Lucky loser
- Alt = Alternate
- SE = Special exempt
- PR = Protected ranking
- ITF = ITF entry
- JE = Junior exempt
- w/o = Walkover
- r = Retired
- d = Defaulted
- SR = Special ranking

=== Draw ===
First round

Quarterfinals

Semifinals

Final

1
- (Spain) MÁ López Jaén
- (Spain) P Riba
6^{6}
7^{7}
[7]

- (Spain) Albert Alcaraz Ivorra
- (Spain) I Navarro
6
3
[10]

- (Spain) Albert Alcaraz Ivorra
- (Spain) I Navarro
7^{8}
6^{4}
[10]

- (Spain) P Carreño Busta
- (Spain) J Martí
4
6
[5]

- (Spain) Albert Alcaraz Ivorra
- (Spain) I Navarro
2
3

4
- (Spain) G Alcaide
- (Spain) C Poch-Gradin

(Spain) D Gimeno Traver
(Spain) Israel Sevilla
6
6

- (Spain) I Cervantes Huegun
- (Spain) G Olaso
DEF

- (Spain) I Cervantes Huegun
- (Spain) G Olaso

(Spain) Alejandro Andino Vallverdu
(Spain) Marcos de Requena
5
4

(Spain) D Gimeno Traver
(Spain) Israel Sevilla
w/o

(Spain) D Gimeno Traver
(Spain) Israel Sevilla
7
6

(Spain) D Gimeno Traver
(Spain) Israel Sevilla
3
4

- (France) Franck Dalla-Santa
- (France) Jonathan Eysseric

3
- (Italy) S Ianni
- (Italy) S Vagnozzi
6
6

(Spain) Guillermo Gómez-Díaz
(United Kingdom) Michael Suleau
DEF

(Spain) Guillermo Gómez-Díaz
(United Kingdom) Michael Suleau
2
2

- (Spain) G Granollers
- (Portugal) J Sousa

3
- (Italy) S Ianni
- (Italy) S Vagnozzi
6
6

3
- (Italy) S Ianni
- (Italy) S Vagnozzi
w/o

3
- (Italy) S Ianni
- (Italy) S Vagnozzi
6
3
[10]

- (Netherlands) T de Bakker
- (Netherlands) A van der Duim
3
5

- (Portugal) Gonçalo Falcão
- (Portugal) P Sousa
4
6
[7]

- (Portugal) Gonçalo Falcão
- (Portugal) P Sousa
6
7

- (Portugal) Gonçalo Falcão
- (Portugal) P Sousa
6
6

- (Spain) Juan Lizariturry
- (Spain) P Martín-Adalia
1
6
[10]

2
- (Chile) J Aguilar
- (Argentina) M Alund
1
1

2
- (Chile) J Aguilar
- (Argentina) M Alund
6
3
[12]
