= 2011 Concurso Internacional de Tenis – San Sebastián – Singles =

San Sebastián – Singles
- 2011 Concurso Internacional de Tenis – San Sebastián

Final
- Champion: (Spain) Albert Ramos
- Runner-up: (Spain) Pere Riba
- Score: 6–1, 6–2

Events
| Singles | Doubles |
- Concurso Internacional de Tenis – San Sebastián

Albert Ramos was the defending champion. He won for the second consecutive year, defeating Pere Riba in the final 6–1, 6–2.

== Seeds ==
1. (Spain) Albert Ramos (champion)
2. (Spain) Pere Riba (final)
3. (Spain) Daniel Gimeno-Traver (semifinals)
4. (Netherlands) Thiemo de Bakker (first round)
5. (France) Benoît Paire (first round)
6. (France) Augustin Gensse (second round, retired)
7. (Spain) Guillermo Olaso (first round, retired due to fever)
8. (Spain) Roberto Bautista-Agut (quarterfinals)

== Draw ==
Key

- Q = Qualifier
- WC = Wild card
- LL = Lucky loser
- Alt = Alternate
- ITF = ITF entry
- PR = Protected ranking
- SR = Special ranking
- SE = Special exempt
- JE = Junior exempt
- JR = Junior Accelerator Programme entrant
- CO = College Accelerator Programme entrant
- NG = Next Gen Accelerator Program entrant
- w/o = Walkover
- r = Retired
- d = Defaulted

=== Finals ===
Semifinals
1 | (Spain) Albert Ramos | 6 | 6
3 | (Spain) Daniel Gimeno-Traver | 4 | 4
(Italy) Simone Vagnozzi | 0 | 2
2 | (Spain) Pere Riba | 6 | 6

Final
1 | (Spain) Albert Ramos | 6 | 6
2 | (Spain) Pere Riba | 1 | 2

=== Top half ===
First round
1 | (Spain) A Ramos | 6 | 6
(Spain) J Martí | 3 | 1
(Spain) G Alcaide | 6 | 6
(France) J Eysseric | 2 | 4
Q | (Spain) G Fraile | 6 | 6
WC | (Spain) Albert Alcaraz Ivorra | 1 | 3
(Spain) I Navarro | 3 | 4
8 | (Spain) R Bautista-Agut | 6 | 6
3 | (Spain) D Gimeno-Traver | 4 | 6 | 6
(Republic of Ireland) C Niland | 6 | 4 | 4
(Republic of Ireland) L Sorensen | 6 | 6
WC | (France) G Mina | 3 | 4
(Portugal) J Sousa | 6 | 7^{7}
WC | (Spain) Juan Lizariturry | 3 | 6^{2}
(Chile) J Aguilar | 6 | 3
7 | (Spain) G Olaso | 1 | 0^{r}

Second round
1 | (Spain) A Ramos | 6^{5} | 6 | 7^{7}
(Spain) G Alcaide | 7^{7} | 3 | 6^{5}
Q | (Spain) G Fraile | 4 | 1
8 | (Spain) R Bautista-Agut | 6 | 6
3 | (Spain) D Gimeno-Traver | 4 | 7 | 7
(Republic of Ireland) L Sorensen | 6 | 5 | 5
(Portugal) J Sousa | 6 | 7^{7}
(Chile) J Aguilar | 4 | 6^{1}

Quarterfinals
1 | (Spain) A Ramos | 1 | 6 | 6
8 | (Spain) R Bautista-Agut | 6 | 4 | 1
3 | (Spain) D Gimeno-Traver | 6 | 6
(Portugal) J Sousa | 0 | 3

Semifinals
1 | (Spain) A Ramos | 6 | 6
3 | (Spain) D Gimeno-Traver | 4 | 4

=== Bottom half ===
First round
6 | (France) A Gensse | 6 | 7
(Germany) A Begemann | 2 | 5
(Kazakhstan) E Korolev | 7^{7} | 6^{6} | 1
Q | (Portugal) P Sousa | 6^{4} | 7^{8} | 6
(Italy) S Vagnozzi | 6 | 6
(France) Laurent Rochette | 1 | 1
(Spain) P Carreño-Busta | 6 | 6
4 | (Netherlands) T de Bakker | 3 | 2
5 | (France) B Paire | 2 | 2
(Netherlands) M Middelkoop | 6 | 6
(Argentina) M Alund | 0 | 1
WC | (Spain) I Cervantes-Huegun | 6 | 6
(Spain) G Granollers | 1 | 1^{r}
Q | (Spain) MÁ López Jaén | 6 | 3
Q | (Spain) Carlos Gómez-Herrera | 0 | 4
2 | (Spain) P Riba | 6 | 6

Second round
6 | (France) A Gensse | 2 | 1 | r
Q | (Portugal) P Sousa | 6 | 2
(Italy) S Vagnozzi | 6 | 4 | 7^{7}
(Spain) P Carreño-Busta | 3 | 6 | 6^{2}
(Netherlands) M Middelkoop | 6 | 6^{5} | 7
WC | (Spain) I Cervantes-Huegun | 4 | 7^{7} | 5
Q | (Spain) MÁ López Jaén | 1 | 3
2 | (Spain) P Riba | 6 | 6

Quarterfinals
Q | (Portugal) P Sousa | 2 | 5
(Italy) S Vagnozzi | 6 | 7
(Netherlands) M Middelkoop | 3 | 3
2 | (Spain) P Riba | 6 | 6

Semifinals
(Italy) S Vagnozzi | 0 | 2
2 | (Spain) P Riba | 6 | 6
