= 2009 Concurso Internacional de Tenis – San Sebastián =

- Date: August 17 – August 23
- Edition: 2nd
- Location: San Sebastián, Spain

Champions

Singles
- (Netherlands) Thiemo de Bakker

Doubles
- (France) Jonathan Eysseric / (France) Romain Jouan
← 2008 ·	Concurso Internacional de Tenis – San Sebastián	· 2010 →

The 2009 Concurso Internacional de Tenis – San Sebastián was a professional tennis tournament played on outdoor red clay courts. It was the second edition of the tournament which was part of the 2009 ATP Challenger Tour. It took place in San Sebastián, Spain between 17 and 23 August 2009.

== Singles main draw entrants ==
=== Seeds ===
Nationality	Player	Ranking*	Seeding
ESP	Rubén Ramírez Hidalgo	99	1
ESP	Santiago Ventura	109	2
ESP	Pablo Andújar	120	3
ALG	Lamine Ouahab	122	4
FRA	Olivier Patience	179	5
NED	Thiemo de Bakker	207	6
ESP	David Marrero	215	7
ESP	Pablo Santos	219	8

- Rankings are as of August 10, 2009.

=== Other entrants ===
The following players received wildcards into the singles main draw:

- (France) Jonathan Eysseric
- (Serbia) Filip Krajinović
- (Spain) Javier Martí
- (Spain) Andoni Vivanco-Guzmán

The following players received entry from the qualifying draw:

- (Poland) Adam Chadaj
- (Spain) Pedro Clar-Rosselló
- (Argentina) Federico del Bonis
- (Spain) Javier Genaro-Martínez

== Champions ==
=== Singles ===
(Netherlands) Thiemo de Bakker def. (Serbia) Filip Krajinović, 6–2, 6–3

=== Doubles ===
(France) Jonathan Eysseric / (France) Romain Jouan def. (Spain) Pedro Clar-Rosselló / (Spain) Albert Ramos-Viñolas, 7–5, 6–3
