= 2011 Concurso Internacional de Tenis – San Sebastián =

- Date: 15–21 August
- Edition: 4th
- Location: San Sebastián, Spain

Champions

Singles
- (Spain) Albert Ramos

Doubles
- (Italy) Stefano Ianni / (Italy) Simone Vagnozzi
- Concurso Internacional de Tenis – San Sebastián

The 2011 Concurso Internacional de Tenis – San Sebastián was a professional tennis tournament played on clay courts. It was the fourth edition of the tournament which is part of the 2011 ATP Challenger Tour. It took place in San Sebastián, Spain between 15 and 21 August 2011.

== ATP entrants ==
=== Seeds ===
| Country | Player | Rank^{1} | Seed |
|---|---|---|---|
| ESP | Albert Ramos | 72 | 1 |
| ESP | Pere Riba | 75 | 2 |
| ESP | Daniel Gimeno Traver | 94 | 3 |
| NED | Thiemo de Bakker | 107 | 4 |
| FRA | Benoît Paire | 119 | 5 |
| FRA | Augustin Gensse | 147 | 6 |
| ESP | Guillermo Olaso | 167 | 7 |
| ESP | Roberto Bautista Agut | 182 | 8 |

- ^{1} Rankings are as of August 8, 2011.

=== Other entrants ===
The following players received wildcards into the singles main draw:

- (Spain) Albert Alcaraz Ivorra
- (Spain) Iñigo Cervantes-Huegun
- (Spain) Juan Lizariturry
- (France) Gianni Mina

The following players received entry from the qualifying draw:

- (Spain) Gorka Fraile
- (Spain) Carlos Gómez-Herrera
- (Spain) Miguel Ángel López Jaén
- (Portugal) Pedro Sousa

== Champions ==
=== Singles ===
(Spain) Albert Ramos def. (Spain) Pere Riba 6–1, 6–2

=== Doubles ===
(Italy) Stefano Ianni / (Italy) Simone Vagnozzi def. (Spain) Daniel Gimeno Traver / (Spain) Israel Sevilla, 6–3, 6–4
