= 2010 Concurso Internacional de Tenis – San Sebastián =

- Date: August 16–22
- Edition: 3rd
- Location: San Sebastián, Spain

Champions

Singles
- (Spain) Albert Ramos Viñolas

Doubles
- (Spain) Rubén Ramírez Hidalgo / (Spain) Santiago Ventura
← 2009 ·	Concurso Internacional de Tenis – San Sebastián	· 2011 →

The 2010 Concurso Internacional de Tenis – San Sebastián was a professional tennis tournament played on outdoor red clay courts. It was the third edition of the tournament which is part of the 2010 ATP Challenger Tour. It took place in San Sebastián, Spain between 16 and 22 August 2010.

== ATP entrants ==
=== Seeds ===
Nationality	Player	Ranking*	Seeding
ESP	Pere Riba	76	1
ESP	Rubén Ramírez Hidalgo	93	2
ESP	Pablo Andújar	113	3
GER	Julian Reister	117	4
ESP	Santiago Ventura	122	5
KAZ	Yuri Schukin	124	6
ESP	Albert Ramos Viñolas	136	7
GER	Denis Gremelmayr	141	8

- Rankings are as of August 9, 2010.

=== Other entrants ===
The following players received wildcards into the singles main draw:

- (Spain) Pablo Carreño Busta
- (Spain) Juan Lizariturry
- (Spain) Javier Martí
- (Spain) Andoni Vivanco-Guzmán

The following players received entry from the qualifying draw:

- (France) Baptiste Dupuy
- (Spain) Marc Fornell Mestres
- (Italy) Gianluca Naso
- (Portugal) Pedro Sousa

== Champions ==
=== Singles ===
(Spain) Albert Ramos Viñolas def. (France) Benoît Paire, 6–4, 6–2

=== Doubles ===
(Spain) Rubén Ramírez Hidalgo / (Spain) Santiago Ventura def. (United States) Brian Battistone / (Sweden) Andreas Siljeström, 6–4, 7–6(3)
