= Albert Ramos Viñolas =

Spanish tennis player (born 1988)

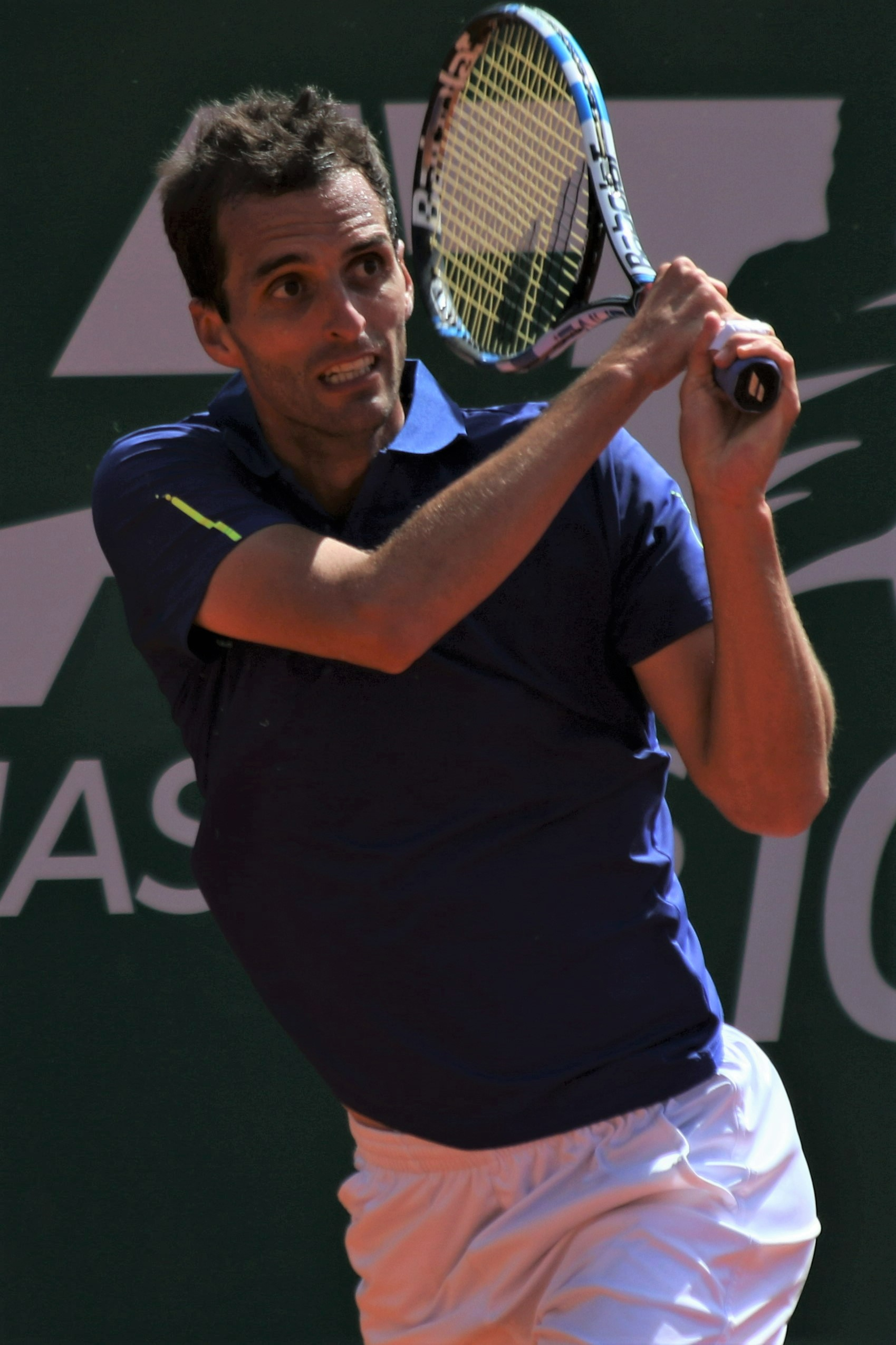
- Ramos Viñolas playing in the 2022 Monte Carlo Masters
- Country (sports): Spain
- Born: 17 January 1988 (age 38) Barcelona, Spain
- Height: 1.88 m (6 ft 2 in)
- Turned pro: 2007
- Retired: 9 October 2025
- Plays: Left-handed (two-handed backhand)
- Coach: José María Díaz; Tiago Leivas
- Prize money: US$11,215,461

Singles
- Career record: 281–333
- Career titles: 4
- Highest ranking: No. 17 (8 May 2017)

Grand Slam singles results
- Australian Open: 3R (2018)
- French Open: QF (2016)
- Wimbledon: 3R (2016, 2017)
- US Open: 2R (2012, 2016, 2017, 2021, 2022)

Doubles
- Career record: 28–148
- Career titles: 0
- Highest ranking: No. 117 (5 March 2018)

Grand Slam doubles results
- Australian Open: 3R (2018)
- French Open: 2R (2022)
- Wimbledon: 1R (2012, 2013, 2015, 2016, 2017, 2018, 2021, 2022)
- US Open: 2R (2013, 2019)

Albert Ramos Viñolas (Spanish pronunciation: [alˈβeɾ ˈramos βiˈɲolas]; (Note: In isolation, Viñolas is pronounced [biˈɲolas] respectively.) born 17 January 1988) is a former Spanish professional tennis player. He reached a career-high ATP singles ranking of world No. 17, in May 2017, after the final of the 2017 Monte Carlo Masters.

== Career ==
=== 2006–2009: Pro beginnings ===
Ramos Viñolas reached the finals of six Futures events, four of which he won. In 2009, he lost in the finals of two ATP Challenger Tour tournaments at the 2009 Copa Sevilla, against his compatriot Pere Riba, and at the 2009 Sicilia Classic Mancuso Company Cup in Palermo, against Romanian player Adrian Ungur.

=== 2010: ATP Tour debut ===
As World No. 167, Albert Ramos Viñolas began 2010 nearly 300 positions higher than the start of the previous season. He lost in the qualifying rounds of Doha, Sydney and the Australian Open before returning to Challenger tournaments for the next three months. After qualifying into the main draw of the Barcelona Open, and securing a straight sets victory in the first round, Ramos Viñolas defeated World No. 12 Fernando González in three close sets. Despite losing to Ernests Gulbis in the third round, his upset over Gonzalez increased his confidence going forward.

Successive losses in the qualifying rounds of the French Open, and Wimbledon led to a dip in his ranking. However success in San Sebastián, reaching his first Challenger final with a win over Benoît Paire, in Seville and other Challenger tournaments, gave Ramos Viñolas a ranking of World No. 123 to finish off his 2010 season.

=== 2011: Cracking the Top 100 ===
Ramos Viñolas played a combination of ATP World Tour events, and Challenger tournaments over the course of 2011. Second round losses at the Chile and Argentina Open to Fabio Fognini, and Tommy Robredo respectively, gave Ramos Viñolas direct entrance into his first ATP tournaments. He tasted his first grand slam success at the French Open after a first round victory over Javier Martí. He lost to eventual quarterfinalist and World No. 5 Robin Söderling in the second round.

After victories in Milan and again at the San Sebastián Challenger, Ramos Viñolas made it to his first ATP Quarterfinal at the Romanian Open, losing to Florian Mayer in straight sets. His performance in Bucharest allowed Ramos Viñolas' ranking to peak below 100 at World No. 87. Following an impressive win over Marin Čilić in the first round of the Shanghai Masters, Ramos Viñolas finished his year at World No. 66.

=== 2012: First ATP final & continued success, top 50 ===
At the 2012 Indian Wells Masters, he won over Richard Gasquet to reach the third round, where he fell to Pablo Andújar. At the 2012 Miami Masters, he defeated world no. 15 player Feliciano López, then lost to Gasquet in the third round. His lone ATP final came in the 2012 Grand Prix Hassan II in Casablanca, which he lost to reigning champion Andújar in an all-Spanish affair.

=== 2013–2015: Mixed results; Continued struggles; Resurgence to his previous best ===
At the 2013 Miami Masters, Ramos Viñolas beat world no. 14 Juan Mónaco and former world no. 4 James Blake to reach the fourth round, where he lost to Jürgen Melzer. At the 2013 Barcelona Open, he defeated Jerzy Janowicz and world no. 15 Kei Nishikori, after which Rafael Nadal defeated him in the quarterfinals.

At the 2015 Shanghai Rolex Masters, Ramos Viñolas defeated world No. 2 Roger Federer in three sets to reach the third round, where he fell to Jo-Wilfried Tsonga.

=== 2016: First Grand Slam quarterfinal and first ATP title ===
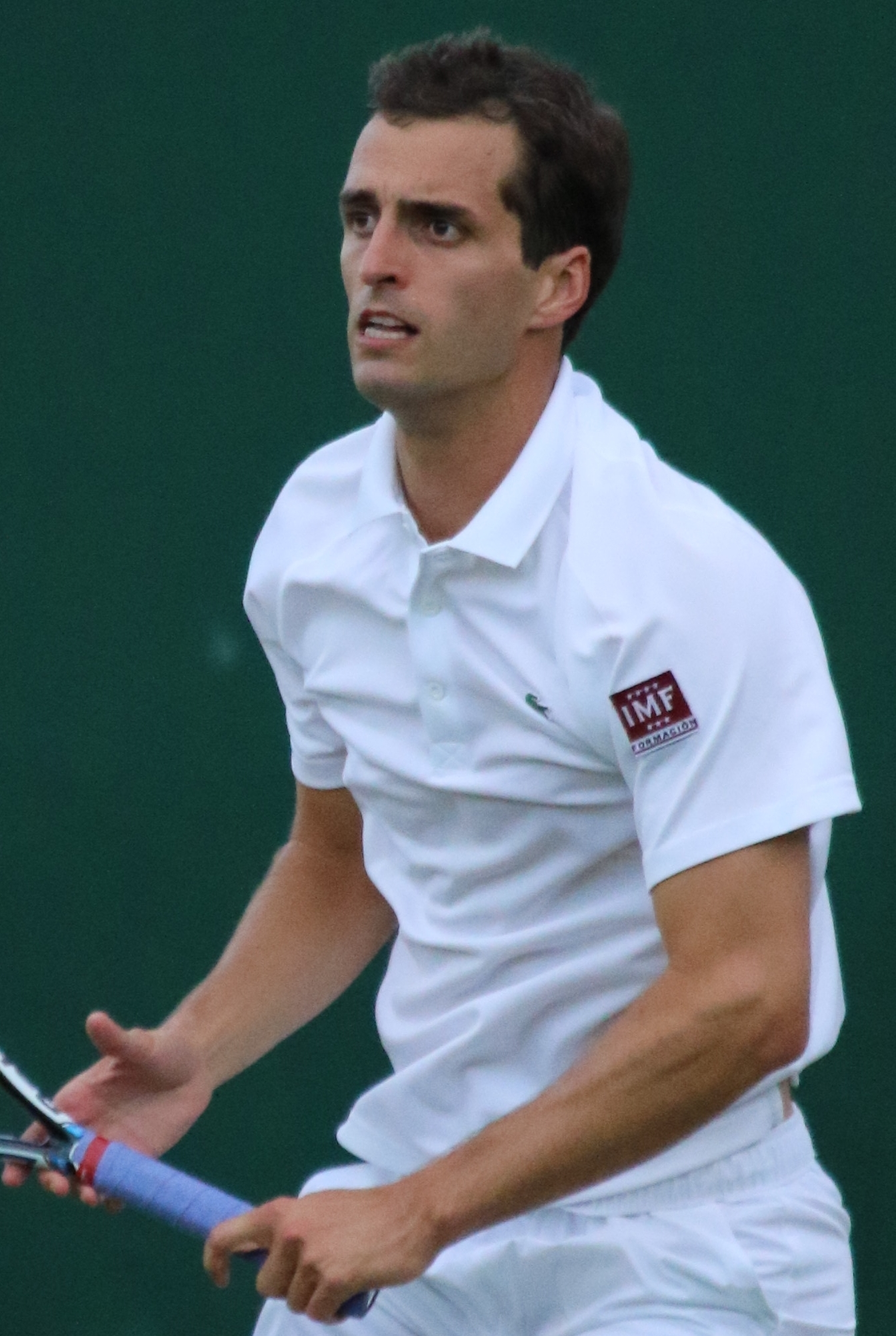
Ramos Viñolas at the 2016 Wimbledon Championships

At the 2016 French Open, Ramos Viñolas advanced to the quarterfinals by defeating eighth seed Milos Raonic in straight sets in the fourth round. He then lost in straight sets to third seed Stan Wawrinka. Later that year at Wimbledon, he defeated Vasek Pospisil in four sets, and then 25th seed Viktor Troicki, to reach the third round for the first time.

Ramos Viñolas next played at the Swedish Open as the third seed. He defeated Roberto Carballés Baena in straight sets, and then beat Andrea Arnaboldi in three sets. In the semifinals, he defeated top seed David Ferrer in straight sets. He won his first ATP title when he defeated fifth seed Fernando Verdasco in the final in straight sets.

He continued his good form for the year by reaching the final in Chengdu, where he lost to the young Russian Karen Khachanov in three sets.

=== 2017: First Masters 1000 Final and top 20 debut ===
Ramos Viñolas reached the final of the 2017 Monte-Carlo Rolex Masters, beating top seed Andy Murray, 5th seed Marin Čilić, 11th seed Lucas Pouille in the 4th round, quarterfinal and semifinal respectively en route to the championship match, where he lost to the 9 times tournament champion Rafael Nadal. He reached his career-high of world No. 17 on 8 May 2017, following a quarterfinal run at the 2017 Barcelona Open Banco Sabadell where he was defeated by the top seed Andy Murray.

=== 2018–2019: Major third round, Second ATP title ===
At the 2018 Australian Open he reached the third round, his best showing at this Grand Slam, where he was defeated by the 14th seed Novak Djokovic.

He won his second title on clay at the 2019 Swiss Open Gstaad in July and reached in the same month his 7th final on clay at the 2019 Generali Open Kitzbühel in Austria, where he lost to top seed Dominic Thiem.

=== 2020–2021: Third ATP title, return to top 40 ===
Ramos Viñolas reached the finals of two ATP tournaments on clay at the 2021 Córdoba Open, where he was defeated by first time qualifier Argentine Juan Manuel Cerúndolo ranked No. 335, and at the 2021 Estoril Open, without losing a set reaching his 10th career final and third ATP title on clay defeating Brit Cameron Norrie in three sets. As a result, he returned to the top 40 on 3 May 2021, for the first time since March 2020.

=== 2022–2025: Fourth title, ATP & United Cups debuts, retirement ===
Ramos Viñolas participated for the first time in the 2022 ATP Cup as part of the Spanish team where he played doubles with Pedro Martínez and lost both doubles matches but Spain still reached the final. Ramos Viñolas won his fourth career title at the 2022 Córdoba Open where he defeated Chilean Alejandro Tabilo 4–6, 6–3, 6–4, coming back from a break deficit in the second set and a double break deficit in the third set.

He made his debut at the 2023 United Cup replacing the No. 2 player for Spain Pablo Carreño Busta where he lost both of his singles matches. He dropped out of the top 50 on 17 April 2023. In July, he reached his twelfth career final at the 2023 Swiss Open Gstaad where he lost to Pedro Cachin. Despite these results on ATP level, he dropped out of the top 95 on 18 September 2023 and out of the top 100 on 26 February 2024.

In April 2024, he qualified for the main draw of his first Masters of the season at the 2024 Mutua Madrid Open defeating compatriot Roberto Bautista Agut.

On 31 March 2025, Ramos Viñolas announced his plans to retire during the 2025 season. His last tournament was the 2025 Copa Faulcombridge, where he lost to Jan Choinski in the quarterfinals.

== Playing style ==
Ramos Viñolas has a baseline game, comparable to compatriot Rafael Nadal. He is a counterpuncher who uses a heavy topspin game to grind opponents down. He has a heavy topspin forehand, which is his strongest shot to move opponents around the court. He can also flatten out his forehand to produce clean winners. Both wings are capable of producing winners, but his flatter forehand can produce many unforced errors. He has an accurate first serve, which he uses to then set up his next shot. His first serve can break down when under pressure. He is a strong mover around the court, and he makes net approaches often. He also plays with a lot of variety, using slices and drop-shots to mix up his game. He has most success on clay where he won all of his career titles and reached the quarterfinals of 2016 French Open and advanced to his first Masters 1000 final.

== Personal life ==
His sister Anna played college tennis at the University of the Pacific. He married Helena Martí Icardo in November 2017, and they had a daughter born in August 2020.

He used Babolat racquets and wore Joma clothes and footwear after ending his contract with Lacoste.

== Performance timelines ==
Key
W	F	SF	QF	#R	RR	Q#	DNQ	A	NH

(W) winner; (F) finalist; (SF) semifinalist; (QF) quarterfinalist; (#R) rounds 4, 3, 2, 1; (RR) round-robin stage; (Q#) qualification round; (DNQ) did not qualify; (A) absent; (NH) not held; (SR) strike rate (events won / competed); (W–L) win–loss record.
To avoid confusion and double counting, these charts are updated at the conclusion of a tournament or when the player's participation has ended.

=== Singles ===
Tournament	2010	2011	2012	2013	2014	2015	2016	2017	2018	2019	2020	2021	2022	2023	2024	2025	W–L
Grand Slam tournaments
Australian Open	Q1	A	1R	1R	1R	1R	2R	1R	3R	1R	1R	1R	1R	1R	1R	A	3–13
French Open	Q2	2R	1R	1R	1R	1R	QF	4R	3R	1R	2R	1R	2R	1R	Q1	1R	12–14
Wimbledon	Q1	A	1R	1R	A	2R	3R	3R	1R	1R	NH	1R	1R	1R	A	A	5–10
US Open	A	1R	2R	1R	1R	1R	2R	2R	1R	1R	1R	2R	2R	1R	1R	A	5–14
Win–loss	0–0	1–2	1–4	0–4	0–3	1–4	8–4	6–4	4–4	0–4	1–3	1–4	2–4	0–4	0–2	0–1	25–51
ATP Masters 1000
Indian Wells Masters	A	A	3R	2R	A	3R	3R	3R	2R	3R	NH	3R	A	1R	A	A	12–9
Miami Masters	A	A	3R	4R	A	2R	2R	2R	A	3R	NH	A	2R	1R	A	A	9–8
Monte-Carlo Masters	A	Q2	1R	2R	2R	2R	1R	F	2R	Q2	NH	1R	3R	1R	A	Q2	11–10
Madrid Masters	A	Q1	1R	A	2R	2R	2R	1R	2R	1R	NH	2R	1R	2R	1R	A	6–11
Rome Masters	A	Q2	1R	2R	Q2	A	2R	1R	3R	2R	1R	A	2R	2R	Q1	A	6–9
Canada Masters	A	A	A	Q1	A	A	A	1R	1R	A	NH	1R	3R	A	A	A	2–4
Cincinnati Masters	A	A	1R	Q1	A	A	1R	3R	1R	A	A	2R	1R	A	A	A	3–6
Shanghai Masters	A	2R	1R	A	A	3R	1R	QF	1R	2R	NH			A	A	A	7–7
Paris Masters	Q2	Q1	2R	Q1	Q1	Q1	2R	2R	Q2	Q1	1R	1R	1R	A	A	A	2–6
Win–loss	0–0	1–1	5–8	6–4	2–2	7–5	6–8	11–9	4–7	6–5	0–2	3–6	4–7	2–5	0–1	0–0	58–70
Career statistics
	2010	2011	2012	2013	2014	2015	2016	2017	2018	2019	2020	2021	2022	2023	2024	2025	Career
Tournaments	4	16	30	22	20	23	32	30	28	25	14	26	28	23	9	2	332
Titles	0	0	0	0	0	0	1	0	0	1	0	1	1	0	0	0	4
Finals	0	0	1	0	0	0	2	2	1	2	0	2	1	0	0	0	11
Year-end ranking	123	66	50	83	63	54	27	23	65	41	46	45	39	89	165	404	$11,215,461

=== Doubles ===
Tournament	2011	2012	2013	2014	2015	2016	2017	2018	2019	2020	2021	2022	W–L
Grand Slam tournaments
Australian Open	A	1R	1R	1R	1R	1R	1R	3R	1R	1R	1R	1R	2–11
French Open	A	1R	1R	A	1R	1R	1R	1R	A	1R	1R	2R	1–9
Wimbledon	A	1R	1R	A	1R	1R	1R	1R	A	NH	1R	1R	0–8
US Open	1R	1R	2R	A	1R	1R	1R	1R	2R	1R	1R	1R	2–11
Win–loss	0–1	0–4	1–4	0–1	0–4	0–4	0–4	2–4	1–2	0–3	0–4	1–4	5–39

== Significant finals ==
=== Masters 1000 finals ===
==== Singles: 1 (1 runner–up) ====
Result	Year	Tournament	Surface	Opponent	Score
Loss	2017	Monte-Carlo Masters	Clay	(Spain) Rafael Nadal	1–6, 3–6

== ATP finals ==
=== Singles: 12 (4 titles, 8 runner-ups) ===
Legend Grand Slam tournaments (0–0) ATP World Tour Finals (0–0) ATP World Tour Masters 1000 (0–1) ATP World Tour 500 Series (0–0) ATP World Tour 250 Series (4–7)	Titles by surface Hard (0–1) Clay (4–7) Grass (0–0)	Titles by setting Outdoor (4–8) Indoor (0–0)

Result	W–L	Date	Tournament	Tier	Surface	Opponent	Score
Loss	0–1	Apr 2012	Grand Prix Hassan II, Morocco	250 Series	Clay	(Spain) Pablo Andújar	1–6, 6–7^{(5–7)}
Win	1–1	Jul 2016	Swedish Open, Sweden	250 Series	Clay	(Spain) Fernando Verdasco	6–3, 6–4
Loss	1–2	Oct 2016	Chengdu Open, China	250 Series	Hard	(Russia) Karen Khachanov	7–6^{(7–4)}, 6–7^{(3–7)}, 3–6
Loss	1–3	Mar 2017	Brasil Open, Brazil	250 Series	Clay	(Uruguay) Pablo Cuevas	7–6^{(7–3)}, 4–6, 4–6
Loss	1–4	Apr 2017	Monte-Carlo Masters, Monaco	Masters 1000	Clay	(Spain) Rafael Nadal	1–6, 3–6
Loss	1–5	Feb 2018	Ecuador Open, Ecuador	250 Series	Clay	(Spain) Roberto Carballés Baena	3–6, 6–4, 4–6
Win	2–5	Jul 2019	Gstaad, Switzerland	250 Series	Clay	(Germany) Cedrik-Marcel Stebe	6–3, 6–2
Loss	2–6	Jul 2019	Austrian Open, Austria	250 Series	Clay	(Austria) Dominic Thiem	6–7^{(0–7)}, 1–6
Loss	2–7	Feb 2021	Córdoba Open, Argentina	250 Series	Clay	(Argentina) Juan Manuel Cerúndolo	0–6, 6–2, 2–6
Win	3–7	May 2021	Estoril Open, Portugal	250 Series	Clay	(United Kingdom) Cameron Norrie	4–6, 6–3, 7–6^{(7–3)}
Win	4–7	Feb 2022	Córdoba Open, Argentina	250 Series	Clay	(Chile) Alejandro Tabilo	4–6, 6–3, 6–4
Loss	4–8	Jul 2023	Gstaad, Switzerland	250 series	Clay	(Argentina) Pedro Cachin	6–3, 0–6, 5–7

=== Doubles: 1 (1 runner-up) ===
Legend Grand Slam tournaments (0–0) ATP World Tour Finals (0–0) ATP World Tour Masters 1000 (0–0) ATP World Tour 500 Series (0–0) ATP World Tour 250 Series (0–1)	Titles by surface Hard (0–0) Clay (0–1) Grass (0–0)	Titles by setting Outdoor (0–1) Indoor (0–0)

Result	W–L	Date	Tournament	Tier	Surface	Partner	Opponents	Score
Loss	0–1	Jul 2013	Swedish Open, Sweden	250 Series	Clay	(Argentina) Carlos Berlocq	(United States) Nicholas Monroe (Germany) Simon Stadler	2–6, 6–3, [3–10]

== ATP Challenger and ITF Futures finals ==
=== Singles: 20 (12–8) ===
Legend ATP Challenger Tour (8–6) ITF Futures Tour (4–2)	Finals by surface Hard (0–1) Clay (12–7)

Result	W–L	Date	Tournament	Tier	Surface	Opponents	Score
Loss	0-1	Jun 2006	Spain F20, Santa Cruz de Tenerife	Futures	Hard	(France) Adrian Mannarino	0–6, 2–6
Loss	0-2	May 2008	Spain F21, Maspalomas	Futures	Clay	(Spain) David Díaz-Ventura	5–7, 3–6
Win	1-2	Jul 2008	Spain F25, Alicante	Futures	Clay	(Morocco) Mounir El Aarej	4–6, 5–0 ret.
Win	2-2	Mar 2009	Spain F9, Badalona	Futures	Clay	(Spain) Roberto Bautista Agut	6–4, 6–4
Win	3-2	May 2009	Spain F15, Balaguer	Futures	Clay	(Spain) Roberto Bautista Agut	6–2, 3–6, 6–4
Win	4-2	May 2009	Spain F16, Lleida	Futures	Clay	(Spain) Pablo Santos González	6–2, 6–3
Loss	4-3	Sep 2009	Seville, Spain	Challenger	Clay	(Spain) Pere Riba	6–7^{(2–7)}, 2–6
Loss	4-4	Sep 2009	Palermo, Italy	Challenger	Clay	(Romania) Adrian Ungur	4–6, 4–6
Win	5-4	Aug 2010	San Sebastián, Spain	Challenger	Clay	(France) Benoît Paire	6–4, 6–2
Win	6-4	Sep 2010	Seville, Spain	Challenger	Clay	(Spain) Pere Riba	6–3, 3–6, 7–5
Win	7-4	Jun 2011	Milan, Italy	Challenger	Clay	(Kazakhstan) Evgeny Korolev	6–4, 3–0, ret.
Loss	7-5	Jun 2011	Turin, Italy	Challenger	Clay	(Argentina) Carlos Berlocq	4–6, 3–6
Win	8-5	Aug 2011	San Sebastián, Spain	Challenger	Clay	(Spain) Pere Riba	6–1, 6–2
Win	9-5	Jun 2014	Milan, Italy	Challenger	Clay	(Spain) Pere Riba	6–3, 7–5
Loss	9-6	Jun 2014	Padova, Italy	Challenger	Clay	(Argentina) Máximo González	3–6, 4–6
Win	10-6	Sep 2014	Genoa, Italy	Challenger	Clay	(Croatia) Mate Delić	6–1, 7–5
Loss	10-7	Sep 2014	Banja Luka, Bosnia and Herzegovina	Challenger	Clay	(Serbia) Viktor Troicki	5–7, 6–4, 5–7
Loss	10-8	Sep 2014	Kenitra, Morocco	Challenger	Clay	(Spain) Daniel Gimeno Traver	3–6, 4–6
Win	11-8	Jul 2015	San Benedetto, Italy	Challenger	Clay	(Italy) Alessandro Giannessi	6–2, 6–4
Win	12-8	Jul 2024	Modena, Italy	Challenger	Clay	(Italy) Federico Arnaboldi	6–4,3–6, 6–2

=== Doubles: 5 (1–4) ===
Legend ATP Challenger Tour (0–2) ITF Futures Tour (1–2)	Finals by surface Hard (0–0) Clay (1–4) Grass (0–0) Carpet (0–0)

Result	W–L	Date	Tournament	Tier	Surface	Partner	Opponents	Score
Loss	0–1	Jul 2007	Spain F26	Futures	Clay	(Spain) Georgi Rumenov Payakov	(Spain) Mariano Albert-Ferrando (Spain) Guillermo Olaso	7–6^{(7–2)}, 6–7^{(5–7)}, 4–6
Win	1–1	Mar 2008	Spain F12	Futures	Clay	(Spain) Guillermo Olaso	(Portugal) Rui Machado (Spain) Andoni Vivanco-Guzmán	6–3, 6–4
Loss	1–2	Oct 2008	Spain F40	Futures	Clay	(Spain) David Canudas-Fernandez	(Australia) Miles Armstrong (Cyprus) Photos Kallias	3–6, 1–6
Loss	1–3	Aug 2009	Vigo, Spain	Challenger	Clay	(Spain) Pedro Clar	(Netherlands) Thiemo de Bakker (Netherlands) Raemon Sluiter	6–7^{(5–7)}, 2–6
Loss	1–4	Aug 2009	San Sebastián, Spain	Challenger	Clay	(Spain) Pedro Clar	(France) Jonathan Eysseric (France) Romain Jouan	5–7, 3–6

== Record against top 10 players ==
Ramos' match record against those who have been ranked in the top 10, with those who have been No. 1 in bold (ATP World Tour, Grand Slam and Davis Cup main draw matches).

- (United Kingdom) Cameron Norrie 4–1
- (Spain) Fernando Verdasco 4–5
- (Argentina) Juan Mónaco 3–1
- (France) Lucas Pouille 3–1
- (Croatia) Marin Čilić 3–6
- (United States) James Blake 2–1
- (France) Richard Gasquet 2–4
- (France) Gaël Monfils 2–5
- (Spain) David Ferrer 2–6
- (Italy) Fabio Fognini 2–8
- (Russia) Nikolay Davydenko 1–0
- (Australia) **Lleyton Hewitt 1–0**
- (United States) Jack Sock 1–0
- (Russia) Mikhail Youzhny 1–0
- (Spain) Roberto Bautista Agut 1–1
- (Chile) Fernando González 1–1
- (Austria) Jürgen Melzer 1–1
- (United Kingdom) **Andy Murray 1–1**
- (Norway) Casper Ruud 3–3
- (Bulgaria) Grigor Dimitrov 1–2
- (Switzerland) **Roger Federer 1–2**
- (United States) John Isner 1–2
- (Canada) Milos Raonic 1–2
- (Canada) Félix Auger-Aliassime 1–2
- (Czech Republic) Radek Štěpánek 1–2
- (Austria) Dominic Thiem 1–2
- (Spain) Pablo Carreño Busta 1–3
- (Spain) Tommy Robredo 1–3
- (Russia) Andrey Rublev 1–3
- (Spain) Nicolás Almagro 1–4
- (Russia) Karen Khachanov 1–4
- (Japan) Kei Nishikori 1–5
- (Argentina) Diego Schwartzman 1–5
- (Cyprus) Marcos Baghdatis 0–1
- (Italy) Matteo Berrettini 0–1
- (United States) Mardy Fish 0–1
- (Belgium) David Goffin 0–1
- (Latvia) Ernests Gulbis 0–1
- (Russia) Daniil Medvedev 0–1
- (Argentina) David Nalbandian 0–1
- (Sweden) Robin Söderling 0–1
- (Germany) Alexander Zverev 0–1
- (Czech Republic) Tomáš Berdych 0–2
- (Argentina) Juan Martín del Potro 0–3
- (Greece) Stefanos Tsitsipas 0–3
- (Spain) **Rafael Nadal 0–4**
- (Serbia) **Novak Djokovic 0–6**
- (France) Jo Wilfried Tsonga 0–6
- (Switzerland) Stan Wawrinka 0–8

* As of 30 May 2023

=== Wins over top-10 players ===
- Ramos has an 8–49 record against players who were, at the time the match was played, ranked in the top 10.

Season	2015	2016	2017	2018	2019	2020	2021	2022	Total
Wins	1	2	2	1	0	0	1	1	**8**

#	Player	Rank	Event	Surface	Rd	Score	ARVR
**2015**
1.	(Switzerland) Roger Federer	3	Shanghai Masters, China	Hard	2R	7–6^{(7–4)}, 2–6, 6–3	70
**2016**
2.	(Canada) Milos Raonic	9	French Open, France	Clay	4R	6–2, 6–4, 6–4	55
3.	(Austria) Dominic Thiem	10	Chengdu Open, China	Hard	QF	6–1, 6–4	31
**2017**
4.	(United Kingdom) Andy Murray	1	Monte-Carlo Masters, Monaco	Clay	3R	2–6, 6–2, 7–5	24
5.	(Croatia) Marin Čilić	8	Monte-Carlo Masters, Monaco	Clay	QF	6–2, 6–7^{(5–7)}, 6–2	24
**2018**
6.	(United States) John Isner	9	Rome Masters, Italy	Clay	2R	6–7^{(5–7)}, 7–6^{(7–2)}, 7–6^{(7–5)}	41
**2021**
7.	(Argentina) Diego Schwartzman	9	Córdoba Open, Argentina	Clay	QF	6–1, 4–6, 6–3	47
**2022**
8.	(United Kingdom) Cameron Norrie	10	Monte-Carlo Masters, Monaco	Clay	2R	6–4, 2–6, 6–4	37
