= Pedro Clar =

Spanish tennis player (born 1986)

- Full name: Pedro Clar Rosselló
- Country (sports): Spain
- Born: 23 January 1986 (age 40) Llucmajor, Mallorca, Spain
- Plays: Right-handed
- Prize money: $97,905

Singles
- Highest ranking: No. 237 (26 Jul 2010)

Grand Slam singles results
- Australian Open: Q1 (2010)
- French Open: Q1 (2010)
- Wimbledon: Q1 (2010)
- US Open: Q2 (2010)

Doubles
- Highest ranking: No. 347 (12 Apr 2010)

Pedro Clar Rosselló (born 23 January 1986) is a Spanish tennis coach and former professional player.

Clar, born in Llucmajor, was at a time the second ranked Mallorcan player on tour behind Rafael Nadal. He reached a best world ranking of 237 in 2010, appearing in all four Grand Slam qualifying draws that year. During his career, he won 11 ITF Futures singles titles.

A member of the Rafa Nadal Academy, Clar is on the coaching team of Norwegian player Casper Ruud and helped the Norwegian reach two Grand Slam finals in 2022.

== ATP Challenger/ITF Futures finals ==
=== Singles: 20 (11–9) ===
Legend
ITF Futures (11–9)

| Result | W–L | Date | Tournament | Tier | Surface | Opponent | Score |
|---|---|---|---|---|---|---|---|
| Win | 1–0 | May 2007 | Spain F16, Vic | Futures | Clay | (Spain) Pere Riba | 0–0 ret. |
| Loss | 1–1 | Jul 2007 | Spain F24, Málaga | Futures | Clay | (Spain) Roberto Bautista Agut | 5–7, 3–6 |
| Loss | 1–2 | Aug 2007 | Spain F29, Xàtiva | Futures | Clay | (Spain) Roberto Bautista Agut | 3–6, 4–6 |
| Loss | 1–3 | Sep 2008 | Bulgaria F7, Sliven | Futures | Clay | (Bulgaria) Ivaylo Traykov | 1–6, 6–3, 5–7 |
| Win | 2–3 | Jun 2009 | Spain F20, La Palma | Futures | Hard | (France) Laurent Rochette | 4–6, 7–6^{(3)}, 7–6^{(4)} |
| Win | 3–3 | Sep 2009 | Portugal F5, Espinho | Futures | Clay | (United Kingdom) Morgan Phillips | 6–4, 4–6, 6–3 |
| Win | 4–3 | Oct 2009 | Croatia F10, Dubrovnik | Futures | Clay | (Hungary) Attila Balázs | 6–3, 7–5 |
| Win | 5–3 | Nov 2009 | Spain F37, Vilafranca | Futures | Clay | (Portugal) João Sousa | 6–1, 6–3 |
| Win | 6–3 | Feb 2010 | Spain F5, Murcia | Futures | Clay | (Spain) Pablo Santos | 6–4, 6–2 |
| Loss | 6–4 | Mar 2010 | Spain F7, Terrassa | Futures | Clay | (Spain) Gabriel Trujillo Soler | 5–7, 2–6 |
| Win | 7–4 | Jun 2010 | Italy F11, Bergamo | Futures | Clay | (Switzerland) Yann Marti | 7–6^{(6)}, 2–6, 7–6^{(4)} |
| Loss | 7–5 | Jan 2011 | Spain F1, Mallorca | Futures | Clay | (Spain) Javier Martí | 6–7^{(5)}, 6–3, 4–6 |
| Loss | 7–6 | Jan 2011 | Spain F2, Mallorca | Futures | Clay | (Spain) Pablo Carreño Busta | 6–2, 2–6, 3–6 |
| Win | 8–6 | Jan 2011 | Spain F3, Mallorca | Futures | Clay | (Spain) Pablo Carreño Busta | 7–5, 6–1 |
| Win | 9–6 | Feb 2011 | Spain F6, Cartagena | Futures | Clay | (Spain) Pablo Carreño Busta | 6–3, 7–6^{(2)} |
| Loss | 9–7 | Mar 2011 | Spain F8, Badalona | Futures | Clay | (Spain) David Estruch | 4–6, 7–6^{(5)}, 4–6 |
| Loss | 9–8 | Mar 2011 | Spain F9, Barcelona | Futures | Clay | (Germany) Jan-Lennard Struff | 4–6, 3–6 |
| Win | 10–8 | Apr 2011 | Spain F10, Reus | Futures | Clay | (Germany) Jan-Lennard Struff | 6–4, 6–3 |
| Loss | 10–9 | Feb 2012 | Spain F1, Mallorca | Futures | Clay | (Spain) Guillermo Olaso | 6–2, 3–6, 3–6 |
| Win | 11–9 | Feb 2012 | Spain F2, Mallorca | Futures | Clay | (United Kingdom) Morgan Phillips | 4–6, 6–4, 6–3 |

=== Doubles: 19 (7–12) ===
Legend
ATP Challenger (0–3)
ITF Futures (7–9)

| Result | W–L | Date | Tournament | Tier | Surface | Partner | Opponents | Score |
|---|---|---|---|---|---|---|---|---|
| Loss | 0–1 | Jan 2007 | Spain F3, Palma de Mallorca | Futures | Hard | (Spain) Pedro Villar-Almiron | (Spain) Pedro Rico Garcia (Spain) Santiago Ventura | 3–6, 4–6 |
| Win | 1–1 | May 2007 | Spain F16, Vic | Futures | Clay | (Spain) Ignacio Coll Riudavets | (Spain) Javier Dejuan-Mora (Spain) Miquel Perez Puigdomenech | 6–3, 2–6, 6–0 |
| Win | 2–1 | Jun 2007 | Spain F20, Maspalomas | Futures | Clay | (Spain) Ignacio Coll Riudavets | (Spain) Angel Alonso-Campos (Germany) Tony Holzinger | 6–1, 6–1 |
| Loss | 2–2 | Jun 2007 | Spain F23, Tenerife | Futures | Hard | (Spain) Ignacio Coll Riudavets | (Togo) Komlavi Loglo (Spain) Pere Riba | 1–6, 4–6 |
| Loss | 2–3 | Jul 2007 | Spain F27, Gandia | Futures | Clay | (Spain) Jordi Marse-Vidri | (Spain) Pablo Santos (Spain) Juan-Miguel Such-Perez | 3–6, 4–6 |
| Loss | 2–4 | Sep 2007 | Spain F33, Oviedo | Futures | Clay | (Spain) Juan Albert Viloca | (Spain) Sergio Pérez Pérez (Spain) Pablo Santos | 6–3, 4–6, 1–6 |
| Loss | 2–5 | Mar 2008 | Spain F11, Castelldefels | Futures | Clay | (Spain) Ignacio Coll Riudavets | (Spain) David Ollivier-Baquero (Spain) Carles Reixach Itoiz | 4–6, 4–6 |
| Win | 3–5 | Apr 2008 | Spain F13, Loja | Futures | Clay | (Spain) Guillermo Olaso | (Mexico) Bruno Rodríguez (Spain) Andoni Vivanco-Guzmán | 7–6^{(5)}, 6–3 |
| Win | 4–5 | Apr 2008 | Spain F16, Reus | Futures | Clay | (Spain) David Canudas-Fernandez | (Spain) Ignacio Coll Riudavets (Spain) Gerard Granollers | 6–3, 46, [10–8] |
| Loss | 4–6 | May 2008 | Spain F17, Lleida | Futures | Clay | (Argentina) Federico Delbonis | (Spain) Agustin Boje-Ordonez (Spain) Pablo Martin-Adalia | 6–7^{(7)}, 5–7 |
| Win | 5–6 | May 2008 | Spain F20, Valldoreix | Futures | Clay | (Spain) Carles Reixach Itoiz | (Portugal) Frederico Marques (Portugal) João Sousa | 6–1, 6–2 |
| Win | 6–6 | Jul 2008 | Spain F28, Dénia | Futures | Clay | (Spain) Pablo Martin-Adalia | (Netherlands Antilles) Alexander Blom (Spain) David Estruch | 6–1, 4–6, [10–6] |
| Loss | 0–1 | Aug 2008 | Vigo Challenger, Spain | Challenger | Clay | (Spain) Pablo Martin-Adalia | (Italy) Marco Crugnola (Italy) Alessandro Motti | 3–6, 6–4, [4–10] |
| Loss | 6–7 | May 2009 | Spain F14, Vic | Futures | Clay | (Spain) Jordi Marse-Vidri | (Spain) Gerard Granollers (Spain) José Antonio Sánchez de Luna | 6–7^{(7)}, 0–6 |
| Loss | 6–8 | Aug 2009 | Spain F27, Bakio | Futures | Hard | (Spain) David Canudas-Fernandez | (Spain) Georgi Rumenov Payakov (Spain) Andoni Vivanco-Guzmán | 6–7^{(5)}, 4–6 |
| Loss | 0–2 | Aug 2009 | Vigo Challenger, Spain | Challenger | Clay | (Spain) Albert Ramos Viñolas | (Netherlands) Thiemode Bakker (Netherlands) Raemon Sluiter | 6–7^{(5)}, 2–6 |
| Loss | 0–3 | Aug 2009 | San Sebastian Challenger, Spain | Challenger | Clay | (Spain) Albert Ramos Viñolas | (France) Jonathan Eysseric (France) Romain Jouan | 5–7, 3–6 |
| Win | 7–8 | Sep 2009 | Portugal F4, Porto | Futures | Clay | (Spain) Carlos Calderon-Rodriguez | (United States) Greg Ouellette (United Kingdom) Daniel Smethurst | 7–6^{(5)}, 6–3 |
| Loss | 7–9 | Mar 2010 | Spain F7, Terrassa | Futures | Clay | (Spain) José Checa Calvo | (Spain) Carles Reixach Itoiz (Spain) Gabriel Trujillo-Soler | 3–6, 6–7^{(2)} |
