= Pere Riba =

Spanish tennis player and coach

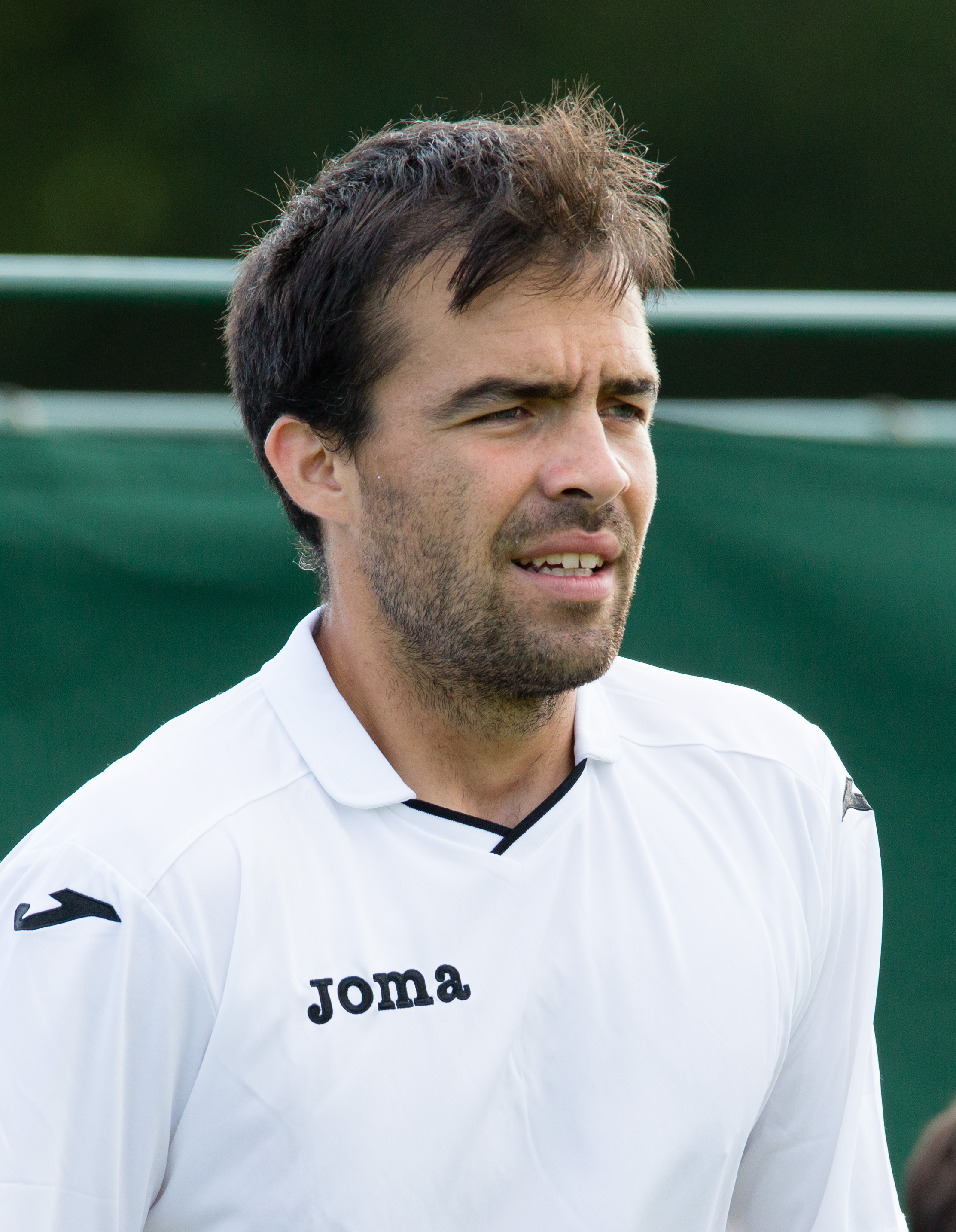
- Country (sports): Spain
- Residence: Barcelona, Spain
- Born: 7 April 1988 (age 38) Barcelona, Spain
- Height: 1.83 m (6 ft 0 in)
- Turned pro: 2004
- Retired: 2020
- Plays: Right-handed (two-handed backhand)
- Prize money: $1,363,323

Singles
- Career record: 24–62
- Career titles: 0
- Highest ranking: No. 65 (16 May 2011)

Grand Slam singles results
- Australian Open: 2R (2011, 2012)
- French Open: 2R (2010, 2011)
- Wimbledon: 1R (2010, 2011, 2014)
- US Open: 1R (2010, 2011, 2014)

Doubles
- Career record: 24–34
- Career titles: 0
- Highest ranking: No. 81 (7 June 2010)

Grand Slam doubles results
- Australian Open: 2R (2011)
- French Open: QF (2010)
- Wimbledon: 1R (2011)
- US Open: 1R (2010, 2011)

Pere Riba Madrid (Catalan: [ˈpeɾə ˈriβə], Spanish: [ˈpeɾe ˈriβa maˈðɾið]; born 7 April 1988) is a Spanish tennis coach and former professional player. He has been ranked as high as No. 65 in singles by the Association of Tennis Professionals (ATP), which he achieved in May 2011, and No. 81 in doubles in June 2010. Riba won 21 titles in singles and doubles on both the ATP Challenger Tour and ITF Men's World Tennis Tour. He reached one major quarterfinal in doubles, at the 2010 French Open.

Following his retirement, Riba has coached and collaborated with several players on the WTA Tour, including Coco Gauff. Since December 2023 he is coaching Zheng Qinwen.

== Professional ==
Riba was coached by former Spanish player Jordi Arrese and the last coach in his career and still part of his confidence inner circle Edu Grosso.

== Coaching career ==
He was the co-founder of GRTennis with Marcel Granollers based in Barcelona (Real Club Polo de Barcelona) focusing on junior development and professional tennis players alongside Edu Grosso from 2017 until 2020.

Riba was the coach of Zheng Qinwen from 2021 until the summer 2023, helping her rise from world No. 169 to No. 7. He then coached Coco Gauff, helping her win the WTA 500 in Washington, the WTA 1000 in Cincinnati and the US Open (2023). In December 2023 he was back coaching Zheng Qinwen, and under his tutelage, she reached the final of the 2024 Australian Open.

== Futures and Challenger finals ==
=== Singles: 37 (13–24) ===
Legend
Challengers (7–15)
Futures (6–9)

Outcome	No.	Date	Tournament	Surface	Opponent	Score
Runner-up	1.	May 16, 2005	Balaguer, Spain	Clay	(Spain) Bartolomé Salvá-Vidal	5–7, 5–7
Runner-up	2.	April 16, 2007	Melilla, Spain	Clay	(Spain) Guillermo Alcaide	6–7^{(4–7)}, 3–6
Runner-up	3.	April 30, 2007	Vic, Spain	Clay	(Spain) Pedro Clar-Rosselló	0–0 ret.
Winner	1.	June 18, 2007	Tenerife, Spain	Clay	(Togo) Komlavi Loglo	6–1, 6–4
Runner-up	4.	July 2, 2007	Alicante, Spain	Clay	(Spain) José Antonio Sánchez-de Luna	6–4, 3–6, 5–7
Runner-up	5.	July 9, 2007	Elche, Spain	Clay	(Germany) Tony Holzinger	6–7^{(4–7)}, 4–6
Runner-up	6.	August 27, 2007	Oviedo, Spain	Clay	(Spain) Pablo Santos	3–6, 0–3 ret.
Winner	2.	February 25, 2008	Terrassa, Spain	Clay	(Spain) Héctor Ruiz Cadenas	6–0, 2–0 ret.
Winner	3.	March 24, 2008	Zaragoza, Spain	Clay	(Germany) Alexander Flock	6–3, 5–7, 6–4
Runner-up	7.	March 31, 2008	Loja, Spain	Clay	(Portugal) Rui Machado	3–6, 6–3, 1–6
Runner-up	8.	July 21, 2008	Međugorje, Bosnia and Herzegovina	Clay	(Spain) Iván Navarro	0–6, 2–6
Winner	4.	September 8, 2008	Seville, Spain	Clay	(Italy) Enrico Burzi	6–1, 6–3
Winner	5.	February 2, 2009	Murcia, Spain	Clay	(Spain) Pablo Martín Adalia	6–0, 6–4
Runner-up	9.	February 16, 2009	Tanger, Morocco	Clay	(Spain) Marc López	7–5, 4–6, 6–7^{(9–11)}
Runner-up	10.	August 31, 2009	Brasov, Romania	Clay	(Netherlands) Thiemo de Bakker	5–7, 0–6
Winner	6.	September 7, 2009	Seville, Spain	Clay	(Spain) Albert Ramos Viñolas	7–6^{(7–2)}, 6–2
Runner-up	11.	October 19, 2009	Florianópolis, Brazil	Clay	(France) Guillaume Rufin	4–6, 6–3, 3–6
Winner	7.	March 22, 2010	Barletta, Italy	Clay	(Belgium) Steve Darcis	6–3 ret.
Winner	8.	June 14, 2010	Bytom, Poland	Clay	(Argentina) Facundo Bagnis	6–0, 6–3
Runner-up	12.	September 11, 2010	Seville, Spain	Clay	(Spain) Albert Ramos Viñolas	3–6, 6–3, 5–7
Runner-up	13.	September 21, 2010	Banja Luka, Bosnia and Herzegovina	Clay	(Turkey) Marsel İlhan	0–6, 6–7^{(4–7)}
Winner	9.	November 21, 2010	Cancún, Mexico	Clay	(Argentina) Carlos Berlocq	6–4, 6–0
Runner-up	14.	August 21, 2011	San Sebastián, Spain	Clay	(Spain) Albert Ramos Viñolas	1–6, 2–6
Runner-up	15.	September 18, 2011	Banja Luka, Bosnia and Herzegovina	Clay	(Slovenia) Blaž Kavčič	1–6, 4–6
Runner-up	16.	March 31, 2013	Vrsar, Croatia	Clay	(Austria) Dominic Thiem	6–2, 3–6, 1–3, ret.
Winner	10.	July 7, 2013	Todi, Italy	Clay	(Colombia) Santiago Giraldo	7–6^{(7–5)}, 2–6, 7–6^{(8–6)}
Runner-up	17.	July 28, 2013	Orbetello, Italy	Clay	(Italy) Filippo Volandri	4–6, 6–7^{(7–9)}
Runner-up	18.	September 22, 2013	Szczecin, Poland	Clay	(Ukraine) Oleksandr Nedovyesov	2–6, 5–7
Winner	11.	March 17, 2014	Panama City, Panama	Clay	(Slovenia) Blaž Rola	7–5, 5–7, 6–2
Runner-up	19.	April 7, 2014	Mersin, Turkey	Clay	(Bosnia and Herzegovina) Damir Džumhur	6–7^{(4–7)}, 3–6
Runner-up	20.	June 2, 2014	Arad, Romania	Clay	(Bosnia and Herzegovina) Damir Džumhur	4–6, 6–7^{(3–7)}
Runner-up	21.	June 22, 2014	Milan, Italy	Clay	(Spain) Albert Ramos Viñolas	3–6, 5–7
Runner-up	22.	September 27, 2015	Sibiu, Romania	Clay	(Romania) Adrian Ungur	4–6, 6–3, 5–7
Winner	12.	December 6, 2015	Antalya, Turkey	Clay	(Bulgaria) Dimitar Kuzmanov	6–2, 3–6, 7–6^{(7–3)}
Runner-up	23.	May 29, 2016	Vicenza, Italy	Clay	(Argentina) Guido Andreozzi	0–6 ret
Winner	13.	March 12, 2017	Rovinj, Croatia	Clay	(Russia) Alexey Vatutin	6–3, 6–0
Runner-up	24.	December 9, 2017	Islamabad, Pakistan	Clay	(Russia) Ivan Nedelko	3–6, 4–6

=== Doubles: 14 (8–6) ===
Legend
Challengers (6–5)
Futures (2–1)

Outcome	No.	Date	Tournament	Surface	Partner	Opponents	Score
Winner	1.	June 18, 2007	Tenerife, Spain	Clay (red)	(Togo) Komlavi Loglo	(Spain) Pedro Clar-Rosselló (Spain) Ignacio Coll-Riudavets	6–1, 6–4
Winner	2.	February 25, 2008	Terrassa]], Spain	Clay (red)	(Spain) Gabriel Trujillo-Soler	(Spain) Marc Fornell-Mestres (Spain) Jordi Marsé-Vidri	6–7^{(6–8)}, 6–3, [10–8]
Runner-up	1.	July 21, 2008	Međugorje, Bosnia and Herzegovina	Clay (red)	(Spain) Pablo Santos	(Czech Republic) Jan Minář (Austria) Martin Slanar	7–5, 6–3
Winner	3.	June 22, 2009	Reggio Emilia, Italy	Clay (red)	(Spain) Miguel Ángel López Jaén	(Italy) Gianluca Naso (Italy) Walter Trusendi	6–4, 6–4
Runner-up	2.	June 29, 2009	Turin, Italy	Clay (red)	(Colombia) Santiago Giraldo	(Italy) Daniele Bracciali (Italy) Potito Starace	6–3, 6–4
Winner	4.	August 31, 2009	Brasov, Romania	Clay (red)	(Spain) Pablo Santos	(Italy) Simone Vagnozzi (Italy) Uros Vico	6–3, 6–2
Runner-up	3.	October 19, 2009	Florianópolis, Brazil	Clay (red)	(Spain) Daniel Gimeno-Traver	(Poland) Tomasz Bednarek (Poland) Mateusz Kowalczyk	6–1, 6–4
Runner-up	4.	November 23, 2009	Puebla, Mexico	Hard	(Spain) Guillermo Olaso	(Canada) Vasek Pospisil (Canada) Adil Shamasdin	7–6^{(9–7)}, 6–0
Winner	5.	January 25, 2010	Bucaramanga, Colombia	Clay (red)	(Spain) Santiago Ventura	(Brazil) Marcelo Demoliner (Brazil) Rodrigo Guidolin	6–2, 6–2
Winner	6.	October 10, 2010	Tarragona, Spain	Clay (red)	(Spain) Guillermo Olaso	(Spain) Pablo Andújar (Spain) Gerard Granollers-Pujol	7–6^{(1)}, 4–6, [10–5]
Winner	7.	March 30, 2014	Barranquilla, Colombia	Clay	(Uruguay) Pablo Cuevas	(Czech Republic) František Čermák (Russia) Michail Elgin	6–4, 6–3
Runner-up	5.	November 16, 2014	Guayaquil, Ecuador	Clay	(Spain) Jordi Samper-Montaña	(Argentina) Máximo González (Argentina) Guido Pella	6–2, 6–7^{(5–7)}, [5–10]
Winner	8.	September 4, 2016	Curitiba, Brazil	Clay	(Spain) Rubén Ramírez Hidalgo	(Brazil) André Ghem (Brazil) Fabrício Neis	6–7^{(3–7)}, 6–4, [10–7]
Runner-up	6.	December 9, 2017	Islamabad, Pakistan	Clay	(France) Luka Pavlovic	(Pakistan) Aqeel Khan (Pakistan) Shahzad Khan	6–7^{(3–7)}, 6–7^{(4–7)}

== Singles performance timeline ==
Key
W	F	SF	QF	#R	RR	Q#	DNQ	A	NH

(W) winner; (F) finalist; (SF) semifinalist; (QF) quarterfinalist; (#R) rounds 4, 3, 2, 1; (RR) round-robin stage; (Q#) qualification round; (DNQ) did not qualify; (A) absent; (NH) not held; (SR) strike rate (events won / competed); (W–L) win–loss record.

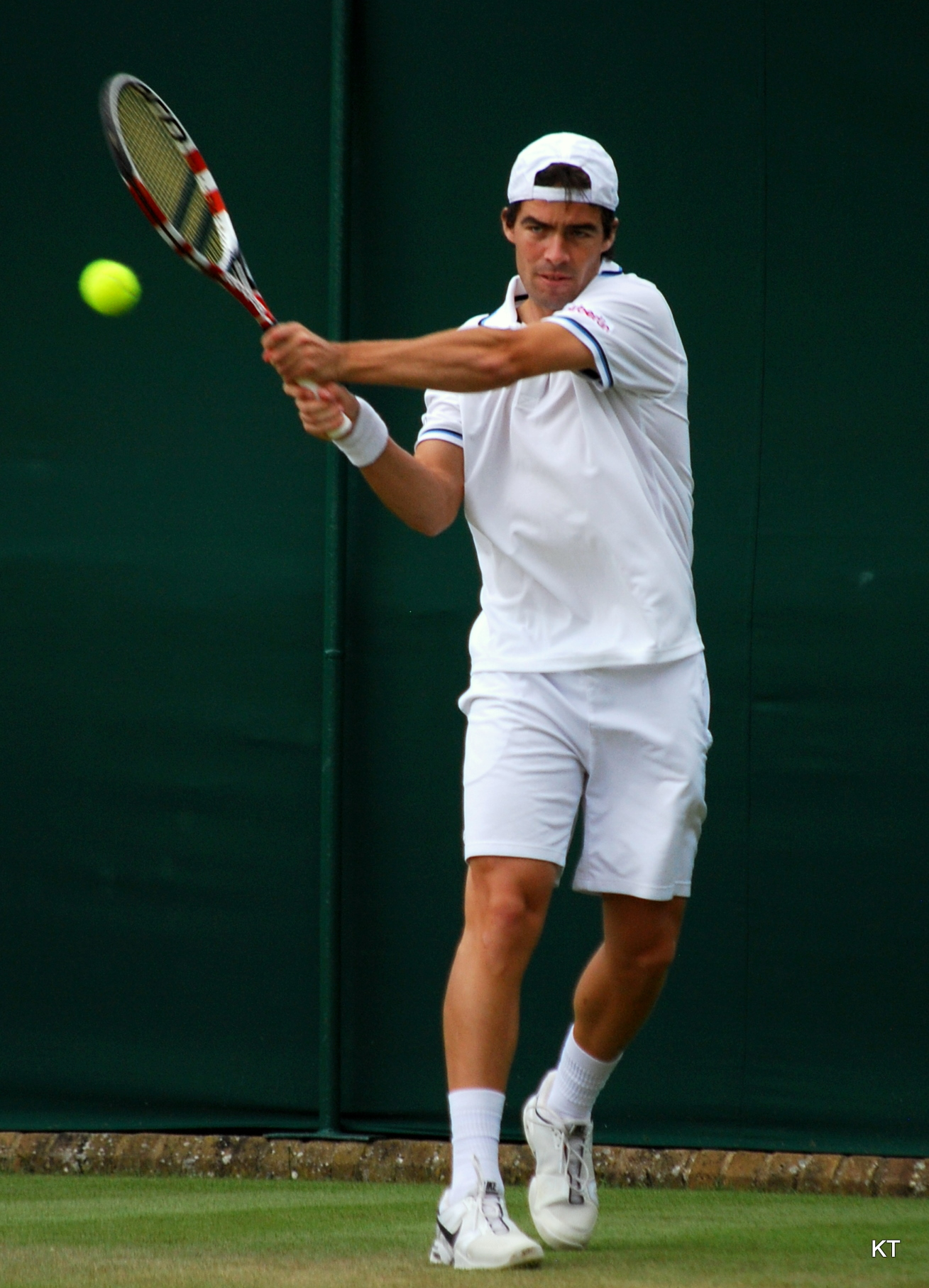
At Wimbledon, 2011

Tournament	2010	2011	2012	2013	2014	2015	2016	W–L
Grand Slam tournaments
Australian Open	A	2R	2R	A	Q2	A	A	2–2
French Open	2R	2R	A	1R	1R	Q1	Q1	2–4
Wimbledon	1R	1R	A	A	1R	Q1	Q2	0–3
US Open	1R	1R	A	A	1R	A	Q1	0–3
Win–loss	1–3	2–4	1–1	0–1	0–3	0–0	0–0	4–12
ATP Masters 1000
Indian Wells Masters	A	1R	A	A	A	A	A	0–1
Miami Masters	A	1R	A	A	A	A	A	0–1
Monte Carlo Masters	A	2R	A	A	A	A	A	1–1
Rome Masters	A	1R	A	A	2R	A	A	1–2
Madrid Masters	1R	2R	A	Q2	Q1	A	A	1–2
Canada Masters	A	A	A	A	A	A	A	0–0
Cincinnati Masters	A	A	A	A	A	A	A	0–0
Shanghai Masters	A	A	A	A	A	A	A	0–0
Paris Masters	A	A	A	A	A	A	A	0–0
Win–loss	0–1	2–5	0–0	0–0	1–1	0–0	0–0	3–7
Career statistics
Finals	0–0	0–0	0–0	0–0	0–0	0–0	0–0	0–0
Year-end ranking	72	89	429	126	114	219	274	
