= Romain Jouan =

French tennis player

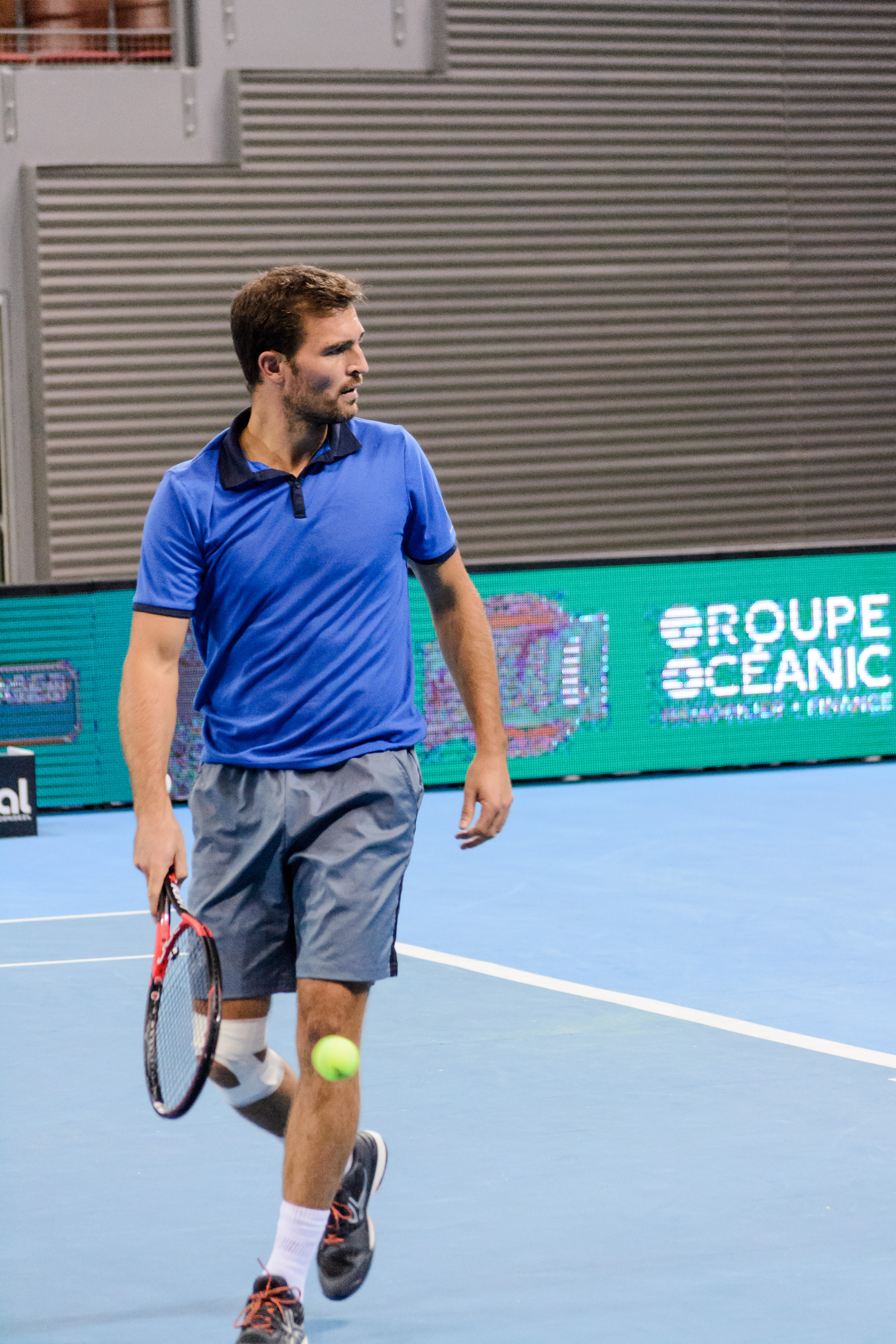
- Country (sports): France
- Residence: Bordeaux, France
- Born: 16 July 1985 (age 41) Landerneau, France
- Height: 1.82 m (5 ft 11 1/2 in)
- Turned pro: 2007
- Plays: Right-handed (two-handed backhand)
- Coach: Laurent Gabail
- Prize money: $220,804

Singles
- Career record: 1–4
- Career titles: 0
- Current ranking: No. 230 (August 22, 2011)

Grand Slam singles results
- Australian Open: Q2 (2012)
- French Open: 1R (2009)
- Wimbledon: Q2 (2012)
- US Open: 1R (2011)

Doubles
- Career record: 0–0
- Career titles: 0
- Highest ranking: No. 206 (March 19, 2012)
- Last updated on: 4 July 2014.

Romain Jouan (born 16 July 1985) is a French professional tennis player.

== Career ==
=== 2008 ===
On September 29, Jouan qualified for the first ATP tournament of his career in Metz after beating Fabio Fognini, Prakash Amritraj and Tobias Kamke. Ranked #440, he defeated #51 Agustín Calleri 5–7, 6–1, 6–2 in the first round of the main draw, but lost to fourth-seeded Paul-Henri Mathieu 6–4, 6–4 in the second.

=== 2009 ===
His ranking not allowing him to enter even the qualifications, it looked like Jouan would not participate in Roland Garros that year; but when wild-card John Isner withdrew, the qualifications had already started, so his wild-card went to Jouan. He was drawn against World No. 6 Andy Roddick in the first round, who defeated him 6–2, 6–4, 6–2 without facing a single break point.

=== 2010 ===
In October, Jouan qualified for the first edition of the Open Sud de France in Montpellier by defeating Josselin Ouanna, Andrea Agazzi and Vincent Millot. For his first ATP Tour-level tournament of the year, he was drawn against American Taylor Dent. Despite winning the first set on a tie-break, he fell 6–7, 6–3, 6–4.

=== 2011 ===
In August, Jouan qualified for the second Grand Slam event of his career at the US Open, after defeating Denis Matsukevich 6–2, 6–4, Mitchell Frank 6–3, 4–6, 6–3 and Denis Kudla 6–4, 6–2 in the three rounds of qualifying.

== Challengers and Futures finals ==
=== Singles: 7 (4–3) ===
Legend
Challengers (0–0)
Futures (4–3)

Outcome	No.	Date	Tournament	Surface	Opponent	Score
Runner-up	1.	May 13, 2007	Lleida, Spain	Clay	(Spain) Juan Albert Viloca	4–6, 3–6
Winner	1.	September 9, 2007	Bagnères-de-Bigorre, France	Hard	(France) Xavier Audouy	4–6, 7–6^{(7–3)}, 6–3
Winner	2.	August 17, 2008	Irun, Spain	Clay	(France) Frédéric Jeanclaude	6–3, 7–6^{(7–3)}
Winner	3.	August 23, 2008	Santander, Spain	Clay	(Greece) Alexandros Jakupovic	4–6, 7–6^{(7–1)}, 6–4
Runner-up	2.	April 25, 2010	Grasse, France	Clay	(France) Olivier Patience	3–6, 4–6
Winner	4.	July 11, 2010	Bourg-en-Bresse, France	Clay	(Australia) James Lemke	6–2, 6–7^{(5–7)}, 6–1
Runner-up	3.	September 19, 2010	Mulhouse, France	Hard (i)	(France) Clément Reix	3–6, 4–6

=== Doubles: 13 (3–10) ===
Legend
Challengers (1–0)
Futures (2–10)

Outcome	No.	Date	Tournament	Surface	Partner	Opponents	Score
Runner-up	1.	March 26, 2006	Poitiers, France	Hard (i)	(France) Jean-Christophe Mégache	(United States) Eric Butorac (United States) Chris Drake	6–7^{(6–8)}, 4–6
Runner-up	2.	January 28, 2007	Deauville, France	Clay (i)	(France) Charly Villeneuve	(France) Julien Maes (France) Petar Popović	6–7^{(2–7)}, 0–6
Runner-up	3.	February 3, 2008	Feucherolles, France	Hard (i)	(France) Mathieu Rodrigues	(France) Thomas Oger (France) Ludovic Walter	3–6, 4–6
Runner-up	4.	July 20, 2008	Saint-Gervais, France	Clay	(France) Jean-Baptiste Perlant	(Mexico) Juan Manuel Elizondo (France) Nicolas Grammare	6–4, 4–6, [9–11]
Runner-up	5.	August 16, 2008	Irun, Spain	Clay	(France) Thomas Cazes-Carrère	(Spain) Iñigo Cervantes-Huegun (Spain) Gerard Granollers	7–6^{(7–5)}, 6–7^{(5–7)}, [6–10]
Runner-up	6.	January 16, 2009	Glasgow, United Kingdom	Hard (i)	(France) Pierrick Ysern	(United Kingdom) Jamie Baker (United Kingdom) Chris Eaton	5–7, 0–6
Winner	1.	August 23, 2009	San Sebastián, Spain	Clay	(France) Jonathan Eysseric	(Spain) Pedro Clar-Rosselló (Spain) Albert Ramos-Viñolas	7–5, 6–3
Winner	2.	July 11, 2010	Bourg-en-Bresse, France	Clay	(France) Jérôme Inzerillo	(France) Baptiste Dupuy (France) Clément Reix	7–5, 6–4
Winner	3.	July 18, 2010	Saint-Gervais, France	Clay	(France) Jérôme Inzerillo	(Canada) Philip Bester (France) Laurent Rochette	2–6, 6–4, [10–7]
Runner-up	7.	August 21, 2010	Padua, Italy	Clay	(France) Olivier Charroin	(Italy) Marco Crugnola (Italy) Alessandro Motti	6–3, 3–6, [8–10]
Runner-up	8.	September 19, 2010	Mulhouse, France	Hard (i)	(France) Jérémy Blandin	(France) Olivier Charroin (Japan) Junn Mitsuhashi	2–6, 3–6
Runner-up	9.	September 26, 2010	Plaisir, France	Hard (i)	(France) Jérémy Blandin	(France) Nicolas Grammare (India) Ashutosh Singh	6–7^{(4–7)}, 5–7
Runner-up	10.	January 30, 2011	Bagnoles-de-l'Orne, France	Clay (i)	(France) Jonathan Eysseric	(France) Florian Reynet (France) Laurent Rochette	6–7^{(5–7)}, 1–6
