= Concurso Internacional de Tenis – San Sebastián =

ATP Challenger Tour
- Location: San Sebastián; Spain
- Venue: Real Club de Tenis de San Sebastián
- Category: ATP Challenger Tour
- Surface: Clay / Outdoors
- Draw: 32S/32Q/16D
- Prize money: €30,000+H
- Website: website

The Concurso Internacional de Tenis – San Sebastián was a tennis tournament held in San Sebastián, Spain. The event was part of the Association of Tennis Professionals (ATP) Challenger Tour and was played on outdoor red clay courts.

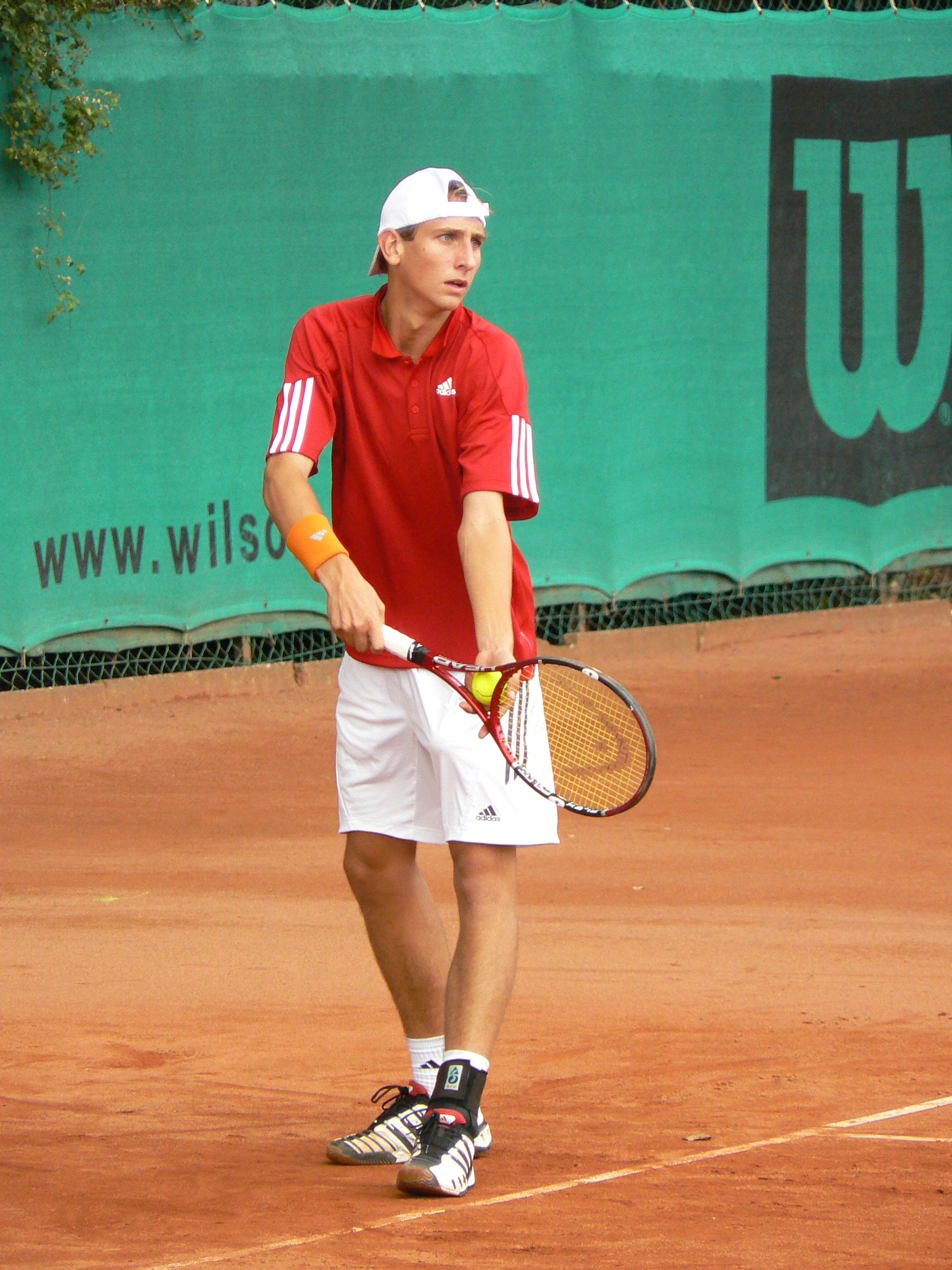
Dutch player Thiemo de Bakker was the champion in 2009.

== Past finals ==
=== Singles ===
Year	Champion	Runner-up	Score	Ref.
2011	(Spain) Albert Ramos	(Spain) Pere Riba	6–1, 6–2	
2010	(Spain) Albert Ramos-Viñolas	(France) Benoît Paire	6–4, 6–2	
2009	(Netherlands) Thiemo de Bakker	(Serbia) Filip Krajinović	6–2, 6–3	
2008	(Spain) Pablo Andújar	(Spain) Rubén Ramírez Hidalgo	6–4, 6–1	

=== Doubles ===
Year	Champion	Runner-up	Score
2011	(Italy) Stefano Ianni (Italy) Simone Vagnozzi	(Spain) Daniel Gimeno-Traver (Spain) Israel Sevilla	6–3, 6–4
2010	(Spain) Rubén Ramírez Hidalgo (Spain) Santiago Ventura	(United States) Brian Battistone (Sweden) Andreas Siljeström	6–4, 7–6(3)
2009	(France) Jonathan Eysseric (France) Romain Jouan	(Spain) Pedro Clar-Rosselló (Spain) Albert Ramos-Viñolas	7–5, 6–3
2008	(Spain) Marc López (Spain) Gabriel Trujillo-Soler	(Spain) Rubén Ramírez Hidalgo (Spain) José Antonio Sánchez-de Luna	6–7(3), 6–3, [10–6]
