= Andoni Vivanco-Guzmán =

Spanish tennis player (born 1990)

- Country (sports): Spain
- Born: 15 October 1990 (age 34); Getxo, Spain
- Plays: Right-handed
- Prize money: $58,420

Singles
- Highest ranking: No. 408 (16 Nov 2009)

Doubles
- Career record: 0–1
- Highest ranking: No. 307 (9 Nov 2009)

Andoni Vivanco-Guzmán (born 15 October 1990) is a Spanish former professional tennis player.

Born in Getxo, Vivanco-Guzmán competed mostly on the ITF Futures circuit, where he won a total of 18 titles across singles and doubles. He had career best rankings of 408 in singles and 307 in doubles. His only ATP Tour main draw appearance came in doubles at the 2008 Valencia Open.

Vivanco-Guzmán is a former tour coach of Lara Arruabarrena.

== ITF Futures titles ==
=== Singles: (3) ===
No.	Date	Tournament	Surface	Opponent	Score
1.	Jan 2009	Spain F2, Magaluf	Clay	(Jamaica) Dustin Brown	6–7^{(4)}, 7–5, 7–6^{(4)}
2.	May 2009	Great Britain F5, Bournemouth	Clay	(Italy) Francesco Piccari	6–2, 6–1
3.	May 2013	Spain F12, Balaguer	Clay	(Spain) Albert Alcaraz Ivorra	6–4, 6–2

=== Doubles: (15) ===
No.	Date	Tournament	Surface	Partner	Opponents	Score
1.	Nov 2008	Spain F42, Las Palmas	Hard	(Spain) Gerard Granollers	(Spain) Agustin Boje-Ordonez (Spain) Ignacio Coll Riudavets	6–3, 6–3
2.	Nov 2008	Spain F43, Maspalomas	Clay	(Spain) Agustin Boje-Ordonez	(Canada) Pierre-Ludovic Duclos (Austria) Armin Sandbichler	6–1, 5–7, [10–7]
3.	Jun 2009	Spain F22, Melilla	Hard	(Spain) Ignacio Coll Riudavets	(South Africa) Dean O'Brien (Spain) Borja Zarco	7–5, 1–6, [10–3]
4.	Aug 2009	Spain F27, Bakio	Hard	(Spain) Georgi Rumenov Payakov	(Spain) David Canudas-Fernandez (Spain) Pedro Clar	7–6^{(5)}, 6–4
5.	Aug 2009	Spain F30, Oviedo	Clay	(Spain) Gabriel Trujillo Soler	(Spain) Pablo Carreño Busta (Spain) Jose-Manuel Garcia-Rodriguez	6–4, 6–4
6.	Aug 2010	Spain F29, Irun	Clay	(Spain) Agustin Boje-Ordonez	(Spain) Sergio Gutiérrez Ferrol (Netherlands) Boy Westerhof	6–4, 6–4
7.	Sep 2010	Spain F32, Oviedo	Clay	(Spain) Pablo Carreño Busta	(Canada) Philip Bester (Canada) Kamil Pajkowski	6–2, 4–6, [10–5]
8.	Feb 2011	Spain F4, Murcia	Clay	(Spain) Gabriel Trujillo Soler	(Spain) Miguel Ángel López Jaén (Spain) Pablo Santos	6–1, 6–2
9.	May 2012	Spain F10, Balaguer	Clay	(Spain) Alejandro Andino Vallverdu	(Austria) Sebastian Bader (Austria) Lukas Koncilia	7–5, 3–6, [10–4]
10.	Aug 2012	Spain F24, Vigo	Clay	(Spain) Miguel Ángel López Jaén	(Russia) Alexander Rumyantsev (Kazakhstan) Denis Yevseyev	6–2, 7–6^{(2)}
11.	Mar 2013	Spain F7, Villajoyosa	Carpet	(Spain) Jaime Pulgar-Garcia	(Spain) Miguel Ángel López Jaén (Spain) Jordi Marse-Vidri	3–6, 6–3, [10–3]
12.	Mar 2013	Spain F8, Villajoyosa	Carpet	(Spain) Oriol Roca Batalla	(Portugal) João Domingues (Spain) Jose Anton Salazar Martin	6–0, 6–3
13.	Apr 2013	Spain F9, Villajoyosa	Carpet	(Spain) Oriol Roca Batalla	(Spain) Eduard Esteve Lobato (Spain) Gerard Granollers	6–4, 3–6, [10–8]
14.	Apr 2013	Spain F10, Les Franqueses del Vallès	Hard	(Spain) Oriol Roca Batalla	(Spain) Ivan Arenas-Gualda (Spain) Jaime Pulgar-Garcia	6–2, 6–3
15.	Aug 2013	Spain F25, Béjar	Hard	(Spain) José Checa Calvo	(Spain) Daniel Casablancas (Spain) David Jordà Sanchis	6–4, 6–2
