= Ignacio Coll Riudavets =

Spanish tennis player (born 1987)

- Country (sports): Spain
- Born: 5 September 1987 (age 37)
- Plays: Right-handed
- Prize money: $75,171

Singles
- Career record: 0–0
- Highest ranking: No. 412 (13 October 2008)

Doubles
- Career record: 0–1
- Highest ranking: No. 282 (27 July 2009)

Ignacio Coll Riudavets (born 5 September 1987) is a Spanish tennis player. He has appeared in the main draw of one ATP Tour event.

In 2009, Coll Riudavets played doubles with Rafael Nadal at the Rotterdam Open, losing in the first round.

Coll Riudavets' best singles rank is World No. 412 and best doubles rank is No. 282.
