= Jonathan Eysseric =

French tennis player

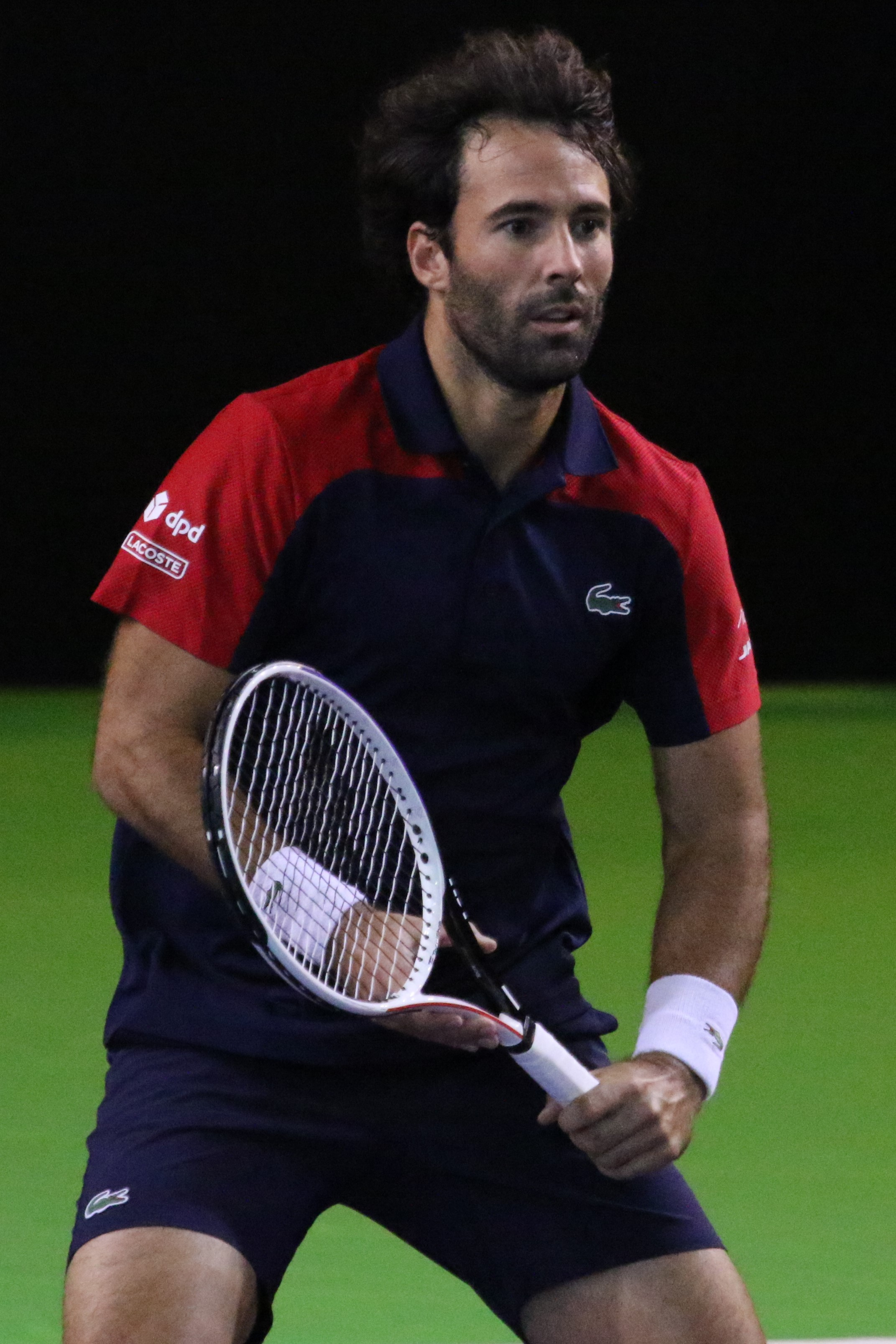
- Eysseric at the 2021 Internationaux de Tennis de Vendée
- Country (sports): France
- Residence: Grasse, France
- Born: 27 May 1990 (age 36) Saint-Germain-en-Laye, France
- Height: 1.80 m (5 ft 11 in)
- Turned pro: 2008
- Retired: 10 December 2025
- Plays: Left-handed (two-handed backhand)
- Coach: Nicolas Metairie, James Stevens
- Prize money: $815,459

Singles
- Career record: 0–4
- Career titles: 0
- Highest ranking: No. 202 (10 June 2013)

Grand Slam singles results
- Australian Open: Q2 (2013, 2017)
- French Open: 1R (2007, 2008)
- Wimbledon: Q2 (2014)
- US Open: Q1 (2013, 2015)

Doubles
- Career record: 21–48
- Career titles: 0
- Highest ranking: No. 72 (2 July 2018)

Grand Slam doubles results
- Australian Open: 2R (2017)
- French Open: 2R (2014, 2018, 2023)
- Wimbledon: 1R (2018)
- US Open: 2R (2024)

Mixed doubles
- Career record: 4–3
- Career titles: 0

Grand Slam mixed doubles results
- French Open: QF (2014)

Jonathan Eysseric (born 27 May 1990) is a French former professional tennis player who specialized in doubles. He reached a career-high doubles ranking of world No. 72 on 2 July 2018.

== Tennis career ==
=== Juniors ===
In 2007, he was the junior finalist at the 2007 Australian Open. At the 2007 French Open, he competed in the men's and juniors singles draws. In men's doubles he competed with Jérémy Chardy, losing in tiebreak sets to seeded Martin Damm and Leander Paes. In mixed doubles, he competed with Alizé Cornet, where they reached the second round. Kellen Damico and Eysseric also competed in the boys' doubles final with Kellen Damico of the United States, and both seniors and juniors singles competitions, losing in four sets in singles and lost to Ričardas Berankis of Lithuania, despite being seeded second. He won the 2007 U.S. Open boys' doubles title with Jérôme Inzerillo as the 6th-seeded team, beating first-seeded Vladimir Ignatic and Roman Jebavý in the semifinals and Grigor Dimitrov and Vasek Pospisil in the final.

As a junior Eysseric compiled a singles win–loss record of 76–26 (and 62–18 in doubles), reaching the No. 1 junior combined world ranking in January 2007.

Junior Grand Slam results:

Australian Open: F (2007)
French Open: 3R (2007, 2008)
Wimbledon: 3R (2007)
US Open: QF (2006)

=== Pro tour ===
He received a wildcard to the 2008 French Open, but he lost to Britain's Andy Murray after having pushed him to 5 sets.

Eysseric retired from professional tennis in December 2025.

== ATP career finals ==
=== Doubles: 1 (1 runner-up) ===
| Legend Grand Slam tournaments (0–0) ATP World Tour Finals (0–0) ATP World Tour Masters 1000 (0–0) ATP World Tour 500 Series (0–0) ATP World Tour 250 Series (0–1) | Finals by surface Hard (0–0) Clay (0–1) Grass (0–0) |

| Result | W–L | Date | Tournament | Tier | Surface | Partner | Opponents | Score |
|---|---|---|---|---|---|---|---|---|
| Loss | 0–1 | Jul 2017 | Swiss Open, Switzerland | 250 Series | Clay | (Croatia) Franko Škugor | (Austria) Oliver Marach (Austria) Philipp Oswald | 3–6, 6–4, [8–10] |

== ATP Challenger and ITF Tour finals ==
=== Singles: 24 (16–8) ===
| Legend (singles) ATP Challenger Tour (0–0) ITF Futures Tour (16–8) | Titles by surface Hard (1–2) Clay (15–6) |

| Result | W–L | Date | Tournament | Tier | Surface | Opponent | Score |
|---|---|---|---|---|---|---|---|
| Loss | 0–1 | Oct 2007 | Tunisia F5, Monastir | Futures | Hard | (Italy) Francesco Piccari | 1–6, 3–6 |
| Win | 1–1 | Nov 2007 | Tunisia F6, Jerba | Futures | Hard | (Turkey) Marsel İlhan | 7–5, 6–4 |
| Win | 2–1 | Nov 2007 | Spain F42, Barcelona | Futures | Clay | (Spain) Carlos Poch Gradin | 6–4, 6–4 |
| Win | 3–1 | May 2008 | Turkey F6, Antalya | Futures | Clay | (Turkey) Marsel İlhan | 3–6, 6–4, 6–4 |
| Win | 4–1 | Jul 2008 | France F11, Bourg-en-Bresse | Futures | Clay | (France) Alexandre Renard | 6–3, 6–2 |
| Loss | 4–2 | Aug 2009 | Russia F4, Moscow | Futures | Clay | (Russia) Andrey Kuznetsov | 4–6, 4–6 |
| Win | 5–2 | Apr 2010 | Brazil F3, Brasília | Futures | Clay | (Italy) Daniel Alejandro López | 4–6, 6–3, 6–3 |
| Win | 6–2 | Jun 2010 | France F8, Blois | Futures | Clay | (Russia) Valery Rudnev | 6–4, 4–6, 7–6^{(7–1)} |
| Win | 7–2 | Aug 2010 | Belgium F2, Koksijde | Futures | Clay | (France) Tak Khunn Wang | 2–6, 6–2, 6–2 |
| Loss | 7–3 | Jan 2011 | France F1, Bagnoles-de-l'Orne | Futures | Clay (i) | (France) Maxime Teixeira | 6–7^{(4–7)}, 6–3, 2–6 |
| Loss | 7–4 | Mar 2011 | France F4, Lille | Futures | Hard (i) | (France) Marc Gicquel | 3–6, 2–6 |
| Win | 8–4 | Apr 2011 | France F7, Grasse | Futures | Clay | (France) Romain Jouan | 7–5, 6–7^{(6–8)}, 7–6^{(9–7)} |
| Loss | 8–5 | Jul 2012 | France F11, Toulon | Futures | Clay | (France) David Guez | 4–6, 4–6 |
| Loss | 8–6 | Jul 2012 | France F13, Bourg-en-Bresse | Futures | Clay | (France) Nicolas Renavand | 4–6, 6–7^{(5–7)} |
| Win | 9–6 | Aug 2012 | Belgium F7, Eupen | Futures | Clay | (Belgium) Julien Cagnina | 6–4, 6–3 |
| Win | 10–6 | Sep 2012 | Germany F16, Kenn | Futures | Clay | (Germany) Steven Moneke | 7–5, 6–0 |
| Loss | 10–7 | Apr 2013 | Italy F2, Rome | Futures | Clay | (Spain) Javier Martí | 1–6, 0–6 |
| Win | 11–7 | Apr 2013 | France F9, Grasse | Futures | Clay | (France) David Guez | 7–5, 6–1 |
| Win | 12–7 | Jan 2014 | France F1, Bagnoles-de-l'Orne | Futures | Clay (i) | (France) Antoine Benneteau | 6–0, 6–3 |
| Win | 13–7 | May 2014 | France F9, Grasse | Futures | Clay | (Italy) Federico Gaio | 6–3, 6–4 |
| Win | 14–7 | Apr 2015 | France F8, Angers | Futures | Clay (i) | (France) Mathias Bourgue | 6–3, 7–6^{(7–2)} |
| Win | 15–7 | Jul 2015 | France F14, Saint-Gervais | Futures | Clay | (France) Maxime Chazal | 3–6, 6–1, 6–4 |
| Loss | 15–8 | Apr 2016 | France F8, Angers | Futures | Clay (i) | (France) Grégoire Barrère | 6–7^{(2–7)}, 4–6 |
| Win | 16–8 | Jul 2016 | France F15, Troyes | Futures | Clay | (France) Tak Khunn Wang | 6–2, 5–7, 6–2 |

=== Doubles: 84 (50 titles, 34 runner-ups) ===
| Legend (doubles) ATP Challenger Tour (23–21) ITF Futures Tour (27–13) | Titles by surface Hard (19–18) Clay (31–16) |

| Result | W–L | Date | Tournament | Tier | Surface | Partner | Opponents | Score |
|---|---|---|---|---|---|---|---|---|
| Win | 1–0 | Apr 2006 | France F6, Grasse | Futures | Clay | (France) Patrice Atias | (France) Kevin Botti (France) Vincent Sapene | 6–2, 3–6, 7–6^{(7–5)} |
| Win | 2–0 | Jul 2006 | France F10, Bourg-en-Bresse | Futures | Clay | (France) Boris Obama | (France) Antoine Benneteau (France) Alexandre Renard | 6–2, 6–3 |
| Win | 3–0 | Jul 2006 | France F11, Saint-Gervais | Futures | Clay | (France) Patrice Atias | (Italy) Luca Bonati (Italy) Alessandro da Col | 6–1, 7–6^{(7–3)} |
| Win | 4–0 | Jul 2007 | France F11, Saint-Gervais | Futures | Clay | (France) Adrian Mannarino | (Ukraine) Ivan Sergeyev (Portugal) Leonardo Tavares | 6–1, 6–4 |
| Loss | 4–1 | Sep 2007 | France F14, Plaisir | Futures | Hard (i) | (France) Jérôme Inzerillo | (Moldova) Roman Borvanov (France) Clément Reix | 7–5, 6–7^{(5–7)}, [7–10] |
| Loss | 4–2 | Oct 2007 | Tunisia F4, Sfax | Futures | Hard | (France) Jérôme Inzerillo | (Italy) Andrea Arnaboldi (Tunisia) Walid Jallali | 4–6, 2–6 |
| Win | 5–2 | Oct 2007 | Tunisia F5, Monastir | Futures | Hard | (France) Jérôme Inzerillo | (Bulgaria) Tihomir Grozdanov (Bulgaria) Simeon Ivanov | 6–4, 6–1 |
| Loss | 5–3 | Jul 2008 | France F10, Montauban | Futures | Clay | (France) Marc Auradou | (France) Julien Jeanpierre (France) Jean-Baptiste Perlant | 6–7^{(2–7)}, 1–6 |
| Win | 6–3 | Aug 2009 | San Sebastián, Spain | Challenger | Clay | (France) Romain Jouan | (Spain) Pedro Clar-Rosselló (Spain) Albert Ramos | 7–5, 6–3 |
| Win | 7–3 | Oct 2009 | USA F26, Mansfield | Futures | Hard | (Canada) Philip Bester | (United States) Brett Joelson (United States) Todd Paul | 6–4, 6–7^{(3–7)}, [10–7] |
| Loss | 7–4 | Apr 2010 | Brazil F3, Brasília | Futures | Clay | (Italy) Daniel Alejandro López | (Brazil) Victor Maynard (Brazil) Nicolas Santos | 4–6, 4–6 |
| Win | 8–4 | Jun 2010 | France F8, Blois | Futures | Clay | (France) Jérôme Inzerillo | (France) Pierre-Hugues Herbert (France) Xavier Pujo | 6–3, 6–2 |
| Win | 9–4 | Jun 2010 | France F9, Toulon | Futures | Clay | (Canada) Philip Bester | (United States) Ashwin Kumar (India) Rupesh Roy | 6–3, 6–4 |
| Win | 10–4 | Jul 2010 | France F10, Montauban | Futures | Clay | (Canada) Philip Bester | (France) Julien Obry (France) Albano Olivetti | w/o |
| Loss | 10–5 | Jan 2011 | France F1, Bagnoles-de-l'Orne | Futures | Clay (i) | (France) Romain Jouan | (France) Florian Reynet (France) Laurent Rochette | 6–7^{(5–7)}, 1–6 |
| Win | 11–5 | Jun 2011 | France F9, Toulon | Futures | Clay | (France) Fabrice Martin | (France) Julien Obry (France) Adrien Puget | 6–3, 7–6^{(7–2)} |
| Loss | 11–6 | Feb 2012 | Brazil F8, Itajaí | Futures | Clay | (Brazil) Fernando Romboli | (Portugal) Leonardo Tavares (Montenegro) Goran Tošić | 6–1, 3–6, [8–10] |
| Win | 12–6 | Apr 2012 | Italy F3, Rome | Futures | Clay | (Chile) Hans Podlipnik Castillo | (Brazil) Daniel Dutra da Silva (Brazil) Pedro Sakamoto | 4–6, 6–4, [10–4] |
| Win | 13–6 | Apr 2012 | France F9, Grasse | Futures | Clay | (France) Nicolas Renavand | (France) Julien Obry (France) Florian Reynet | 6–3, 6–0 |
| Win | 14–6 | Jul 2012 | France F12, Montauban | Futures | Clay | (France) Nicolas Renavand | (France) Pierre-Hugues Herbert (France) Hugo Nys | 6–7^{(3–7)}, 6–4, [11–9] |
| Win | 15–6 | Mar 2013 | France F4, Lille | Futures | Hard (i) | (France) Nicolas Renavand | (United Kingdom) Lewis Burton (Republic of Ireland) James Cluskey | 6–7^{(3–7)}, 7–6^{(7–5)}, [10–5] |
| Win | 16–6 | Apr 2013 | France F9, Grasse | Futures | Clay | (France) Nicolas Renavand | (Germany) Jeremy Jahn (Germany) Tim Pütz | 7–6^{(8–6)}, 6–4 |
| Win | 17–6 | Jun 2013 | Blois, France | Challenger | Clay | (France) Nicolas Renavand | (Philippines) Ruben Gonzales (Australia) Chris Letcher | 6–3, 6–4 |
| Win | 18–6 | Jul 2013 | Timișoara, Romania | Challenger | Clay | (France) Nicolas Renavand | (Serbia) Ilija Vučić (Serbia) Miljan Zekić | 6–7^{(6–8)}, 6–2, [10–7] |
| Win | 19–6 | Feb 2014 | France F3, Feucherolles | Futures | Hard (i) | (France) Nicolas Renavand | (France) Tristan Lamasine (France) Laurent Lokoli | 7–6^{(7–5)}, 6–4 |
| Win | 20–6 | Mar 2014 | France F4, Lille | Futures | Hard (i) | (Belgium) Maxime Authom | (Spain) Juan-Samuel Arauzo-Martínez (Spain) Iván Arenas-Gualda | 6–4, 6–3 |
| Win | 21–6 | May 2014 | France F9, Grasse | Futures | Clay | (Monaco) Benjamin Balleret | (Ukraine) Marat Deviatiarov (Argentina) Pablo Galdón | 7–6^{(9–7)}, 7–5 |
| Loss | 21–7 | Nov 2014 | Reunion Island, Reunion | Challenger | Hard | (France) Fabrice Martin | (Netherlands) Robin Haase (Croatia) Mate Pavić | 5–7, 6–4, [7–10] |
| Loss | 21–8 | Mar 2015 | France F4, Lille | Futures | Hard (i) | (France) Constant Lestienne | (Belgium) Yannick Mertens (Netherlands) Boy Westerhof | 4–6, 4–6 |
| Win | 22–8 | Apr 2015 | France F8, Angers | Futures | Clay (i) | (France) Tom Jomby | (Austria) Sebastian Bader (Austria) Tristan-Samuel Weissborn | 6–3, 6–4 |
| Win | 23–8 | Sep 2015 | Nanchang, China, P.R. | Challenger | Hard | (Estonia) Jürgen Zopp | (Chinese Taipei) Lee Hsin-han (Israel) Amir Weintraub | 6–4, 6–2 |
| Loss | 23–9 | Oct 2015 | France F21, Nevers | Futures | Hard (i) | (France) Tom Jomby | (Netherlands) Sander Arends (Netherlands) Niels Lootsma | 4–6, 5–7 |
| Loss | 23–10 | Oct 2015 | France F23, Rodez | Futures | Hard (i) | (France) Tom Jomby | (Canada) Filip Peliwo (France) Fabien Reboul | 7–6^{(7–2)}, 4–6, [4–10] |
| Loss | 23–11 | Jan 2016 | Rio de Janeiro, Brazil | Challenger | Clay | (Mexico) Miguel Ángel Reyes-Varela | (Portugal) Gastão Elias (Brazil) André Ghem | 4–6, 6–7^{(2–7)} |
| Loss | 23–12 | Feb 2016 | Santo Domingo, Dominican Republic | Challenger | Clay | (Croatia) Franko Škugor | (Uruguay) Ariel Behar (Ecuador) Giovanni Lapentti | 5–7, 4–6 |
| Win | 24–12 | Mar 2016 | France F6, Poitiers | Futures | Hard (i) | (Belgium) Maxime Authom | (Netherlands) Scott Griekspoor (Netherlands) Tallon Griekspoor | 4–6, 6–4, [11–9] |
| Win | 25–12 | Apr 2016 | France F8, Angers | Futures | Clay (i) | (Belgium) Maxime Authom | (France) Grégoire Barrère (France) Adrien Puget | 6–3, 6–0 |
| Loss | 25–13 | Jun 2016 | Lyon, France | Challenger | Clay | (Croatia) Franko Škugor | (France) Grégoire Barrère (France) Tristan Lamasine | 6–2, 3–6, [6–10] |
| Win | 26–13 | Jul 2016 | France F15, Troyes | Futures | Clay | (Brazil) Fernando Romboli | (Ukraine) Vadim Alekseenko (France) Maxime Mora | 6–4, 6–1 |
| Win | 27–13 | Aug 2016 | Liberec, Czech Republic | Challenger | Clay | (Brazil) André Ghem | (Uruguay) Ariel Behar (Croatia) Dino Marcan | 6–0, 6–4 |
| Win | 28–13 | Aug 2016 | Italy F24, Cornaiano | Futures | Clay | (Dominican Republic) José Hernández-Fernández | (Czech Republic) Zdeněk Kolář (Chile) Bastian Malla | 7–6^{(7–2)}, 2–6, [10–4] |
| Win | 29–13 | Aug 2016 | Italy F25, Padova | Futures | Clay | (Italy) Matteo Viola | (Italy) Francisco Bahamonde (Uruguay) Marcel Felder | 4–6, 6–1, [10–8] |
| Loss | 29–14 | Sep 2016 | Sibiu, Romania | Challenger | Clay | (France) Tristan Lamasine | (Netherlands) Robin Haase (Germany) Tim Pütz | 4–6, 2–6 |
| Win | 30–14 | Oct 2016 | Ningbo, China, P.R. | Challenger | Hard | (Ukraine) Sergiy Stakhovsky | (United States) Stefan Kozlov (Japan) Akira Santillan | 6–4, 7–6^{(7–4)} |
| Loss | 30–15 | Oct 2016 | Suzhou, China, P.R. | Challenger | Hard | (Italy) Andrea Arnaboldi | (Russia) Mikhail Elgin (Russia) Alexander Kudryavtsev | 6–4, 1–6, [7–10] |
| Win | 31–15 | Nov 2016 | Mouilleron-le-Captif, France | Challenger | Hard (i) | (France) Édouard Roger-Vasselin | (Sweden) Johan Brunström (Sweden) Andreas Siljeström | 6–7^{(1–7)}, 7–6^{(7–3)}, [11–9] |
| Win | 32–15 | Jan 2017 | Bangkok, Thailand | Challenger | Hard | (France) Grégoire Barrère | (Japan) Yūichi Sugita (China) Wu Di | 6–3, 6–2 |
| Loss | 32–16 | Mar 2017 | Spain F8, Reus | Futures | Clay | (Belgium) Germain Gigounon | (Spain) Sergio Martos Gornés (Chile) Cristóbal Saavedra Corvalán | 6–3, 6–7^{(7–9)}, [4–10] |
| Win | 33–16 | Jul 2017 | Recanati, Italy | Challenger | Hard | (France) Quentin Halys | (Italy) Julian Ocleppo (Italy) Andrea Vavassori | 6–7^{(3–7)}, 6–4, [12–10] |
| Win | 34–16 | Jul 2017 | Perugia, Italy | Challenger | Clay | (Italy) Salvatore Caruso | (Argentina) Nicolás Kicker (Brazil) Fabrício Neis | 6–3, 6–3 |
| Win | 35–16 | Sep 2017 | Istanbul, Turkey | Challenger | Hard | (Germany) Andre Begemann | (Monaco) Romain Arneodo (France) Hugo Nys | 6–3, 5–7, [10–4] |
| Loss | 35–17 | Oct 2017 | Orléans, France | Challenger | Hard (i) | (France) Tristan Lamasine | (Argentina) Guillermo Durán (Argentina) Andrés Molteni | 3–6, 7–6^{(7–4)}, [11–13] |
| Win | 36–17 | Nov 2017 | Mouilleron-le-Captif, France | Challenger | Hard (i) | (Germany) Andre Begemann | (Poland) Tomasz Bednarek (Netherlands) David Pel | 6–3, 6–4 |
| Win | 37–17 | Mar 2018 | Santiago, Chile | Challenger | Clay | (Monaco) Romain Arneodo | (Argentina) Guido Andreozzi (Argentina) Guillermo Durán | 7–6^{(7–4)}, 1–6, [12–10] |
| Loss | 37–18 | Apr 2018 | Le Gosier, Guadeloupe | Challenger | Hard | (Belgium) Ruben Bemelmans | (Australia) John-Patrick Smith (United Kingdom) Neal Skupski | 6–7^{(3–7)}, 4–6 |
| Loss | 37–19 | Apr 2018 | Tunis, Tunisia | Challenger | Clay | (United Kingdom) Joe Salisbury | (Ukraine) Denys Molchanov (Slovakia) Igor Zelenay | 6–7^{(4–7)}, 2–6 |
| Loss | 37–20 | Mar 2019 | Saint Brieuc, France | Challenger | Hard (i) | (Croatia) Antonio Šančić | (Israel) Jonathan Erlich (France) Fabrice Martin | 6–7^{(2–7)}, 6–7^{(2–7)} |
| Win | 38–20 | Sep 2019 | M25 Bagneres-De-Bigorre, France | World Tennis Tour | Hard | (France) Tom Jomby | (Israel) Edan Leshem (France) Albano Olivetti | 6–1, 3–6, [10–3] |
| Win | 39–20 | Oct 2019 | M25 Jounieh, Lebanon | World Tennis Tour | Clay | (France) Corentin Denolly | (Sweden) Eric Ahren Moonga (Sweden) Jonathan Mridha | 6–7^{(4–7)}, 7–6^{(7–2)}, [10–7] |
| Loss | 39–21 | Feb 2020 | M15 Palma Nova, Spain | World Tennis Tour | Clay | (France) Maxime Mora | (Spain) Alvaro Lopez San Martin (Spain) Nikolás Sánchez Izquierdo | 4–6, 6–7^{(4–7)} |
| Loss | 39–22 | Nov 2020 | M15 Heraklion, Greece | World Tennis Tour | Hard | (France) Corentin Denolly | (Brazil) Mateus Alves (Argentina) Facundo Diaz Acosta | 6–4, 3–6, [4–10] |
| Win | 40–22 | Mar 2021 | M15 Bratislava, Slovak Republic | World Tennis Tour | Hard | (Romania) Victor Vlad Cornea | (Slovakia) Matej Galik (Slovakia) Miloš Karol | 7–6^{(7–3)}, 6–1 |
| Loss | 40–23 | May 2021 | M15 Helsinki, Finland | World Tennis Tour | Clay | (France) Titouan Droguet | (Colombia) Cristian Rodriguez (Netherlands) Glenn Smits | 6–7^{(6–8)}, 2–6 |
| Win | 41–23 | Oct 2021 | Mouilleron-le-Captif, France | Challenger | Hard (i) | (France) Quentin Halys | (Netherlands) David Pel (Pakistan) Aisam-ul-Haq Qureshi | 4–6, 7–6^{(7–5)}, [10–8] |
| Win | 42–23 | Feb 2022 | Cherbourg, France | Challenger | Hard (i) | (France) Quentin Halys | (Germany) Hendrik Jebens (Germany) Niklas Schell | 7–6^{(8–6)}, 6–2 |
| Loss | 42–24 | Mar 2022 | Lille, France | Challenger | Hard (i) | (France) Quentin Halys | (Norway) Viktor Durasovic (Finland) Patrik Niklas-Salminen | 5-7, 6-7^{(1-7)} |
| Loss | 42–25 | Mar 2022 | Saint-Brieuc, France | Challenger | Hard (i) | (Netherlands) Robin Haase | (Netherlands) Sander Arends (Netherlands) David Pel | 3-6, 3-6 |
| Loss | 42–26 | Apr 2022 | Mexico City, Mexico | Challenger | Clay | (New Zealand) Artem Sitak | (Chile) Nicolás Jarry (Brazil) Matheus Pucinelli de Almeida | 2-6, 3-6 |
| Win | 43–26 | Jun 2022 | Lyon, France | Challenger | Clay | (Monaco) Romain Arneodo | (Netherlands) Sander Arends (Netherlands) David Pel | 7–5, 4–6, [10–4] |
| Loss | 43–27 | June 2022 | Blois, France | Challenger | Clay | (Monaco) Romain Arneodo | (India) Sriram Balaji (India) Jeevan Nedunchezhiyan | 4-6, 7-6^{(7-3)}, [7-10] |
| Loss | 43–28 | Jul 2022 | Todi, Italy | Challenger | Clay | (Monaco) Romain Arneodo | (Argentina) Guido Andreozzi (Argentina) Guillermo Durán | 1-6, 6-2, [6-10] |
| Loss | 43–29 | Aug 2022 | Granby, Canada | Challenger | Hard | (New Zealand) Artem Sitak | (United Kingdom) Julian Cash (United Kingdom) Henry Patten | 3–6, 2–6 |
| Win | 44–29 | Sep 2022 | Rennes, France | Challenger | Hard (i) | (Netherlands) David Pel | (France) Dan Added (France) Albano Olivetti | 6–4, 6–4 |
| Loss | 44–30 | Oct 2022 | Bergamo, Italy | Challenger | Hard (i) | (France) Albano Olivetti | (Germany) Henri Squire (Germany) Jan-Lennard Struff | 4–6, 7–6^{(7–5)}, [7–10] |
| Loss | 44–31 | Jan 2023 | Oeiras, Portugal | Challenger | Hard (i) | (France) Pierre-Hugues Herbert | (Romania) Victor Vlad Cornea (Czech Republic) Petr Nouza | 3–6, 6–7^{(3–7)} |
| Loss | 44–32 | Feb 2023 | Koblenz, Germany | Challenger | Hard (i) | (Ukraine) Denys Molchanov | (Germany) Fabian Fallert (Germany) Hendrik Jebens | 6–7^{(2–7)}, 3–6 |
| Win | 45–32 | Jun 2023 | Parma, Italy | Challenger | Clay | (Mexico) Miguel Angel Reyes-Varela | (Switzerland) Luca Margaroli (India) Ramkumar Ramanathan | 6–2, 6–3 |
| Win | 46–32 | Jul 2023 | Milan, Italy | Challenger | Clay | (Ukraine) Denys Molchanov | (France) Luca Sanchez (France) Theo Arribage | 6–2, 6–4 |
| Win | 47–32 | Sep 2023 | Cassis, France | Challenger | Hard | (France) Dan Added | (France) Antoine Hoang (United Kingdom) Liam Broady | 6–0, 4–6, [11–9] |
| Loss | 47–33 | Sep 2023 | Saint-Tropez, France | Challenger | Hard | (France) Harold Mayot | (France) Dan Added (France) Albano Olivetti | 6–3, 0–1 Ret. |
| Loss | 47–34 | Mar 2024 | Girona, Spain | Challenger | Clay | (France) Albano Olivetti | (Ecuador) Gonzalo Escobar (Kazakhstan) Aleksandr Nedovyesov | 6–7^{(1–7)}, 4–6 |
| Win | 48–34 | Apr 2024 | Split, Croatia | Challenger | Clay | (Netherlands) Bart Stevens | (Sweden) Filip Bergevi (Netherlands) Mick Veldheer | 0–6, 6–4, [10–8] |
| Win | 49–34 | Jun 2024 | Zagreb, Croatia | Challenger | Clay | (France) Quentin Halys | (Romania) Mircea-Alexandru Jecan (Portugal) Henrique Rocha | 6–4, 6–4 |
| Win | 50–34 | Jul 2024 | Modena, Italy | Challenger | Clay | (United States) George Goldhoff | (Germany) Andre Begemann (Finland) Patrick Niklas-Salminen | 6–3, 3–6, [10–8] |
