= Miguel Ángel López Jaén =

Spanish tennis player (born 1982)

- Country (sports): Spain
- Residence: Elche, Alicante, Spain
- Born: 29 November 1982 (age 42) Elche, Alicante, Spain
- Height: 1.87 m (6 ft 2 in)
- Turned pro: 2000
- Plays: Right-handed (two-handed backhand)
- Prize money: $186,036

Singles
- Career record: 1–2
- Career titles: 0
- Highest ranking: No. 173 (11 August 2008)

Grand Slam singles results
- Australian Open: Q2 (2008)
- French Open: 2R (2008)
- Wimbledon: Q1 (2008)
- US Open: Q1 (2008)

Doubles
- Career record: 0–1
- Career titles: 0
- Highest ranking: No. 175 (16 February 2009)
- Last updated on: 15 July 2014.

Miguel Ángel López Jaén (Spanish pronunciation: [miɣel ˈaŋxel ˈlopeθ xaˈen]; born 29 November 1982 in Elche, Spain) is a professional tennis player from Spain.

== Junior career ==
López Jaén had a brief career at the top level of Juniors play, reaching a high of No. 76 in April 2000 before turning his sights on pro tournaments.

== Professional career ==
=== 2000 to 2007 ===
López Jaén cracked the top-300 as a 20-year-old in 2003, but was sidelined by injury early in 2004. He regained his form in 2007, when he again cracked the top-300 late in the year.

=== 2008 ===
From January through March, López Jaén met with limited success, failing to qualify in his ATP attempts, and having limited success at the Futures level.

However, in April, López Jaén qualified into his first ATP tournament, beating No. 161 Dušan Vemić in the qualifying round before bowing out to No. 27 Nicolás Almagro in the main draw in Valencia, Spain. After failing to qualify the next week in Barcelona, he beat his first top-100 opponent, No. 97 Peter Luczak, at a Challenger in Spain in May.

Later in May, López Jaén qualified for the 2008 French Open, beating No. 118 Brian Dabul and No. 242 Alex Bogdanovic to gain entry into his first Grand Slam main draw. He then won his first round match against No. 111 Frank Dancevic in four tight sets, losing to World No. 3 Novak Djokovic in the second round.

López Jaén last played in the 2015 Kazakhstan F4 Futures tournament, losing to George Tsivadze in the Round of 32.

López Jaén has earned a total of $208,271 in his ATP career.

== Career finals ==
=== Singles ===
Legend (singles)
Grand Slam (0)
ATP World Tour Masters 1000 (0)
ATP World Tour 500 (0)
ATP World Tour 250 (0)
ATP Challenger Tour (0)
ITF Futures (0)

==== Runner-up (1) ====
No.	Date	Tournament	Surface	Opponent	Score
1.	9 June 2008	Košice	Clay	(Czech Republic) Lukáš Rosol	5–7, 1–6

=== Doubles (1) ===
Legend (doubles)
Grand Slam (0)
ATP World Tour Masters 1000 (0)
ATP World Tour 500 (0)
ATP World Tour 250 (0)
ATP Challenger Tour (1)
ITF Futures (0)

No.	Date	Tournament	Surface	Partner	Opponents	Score
1.	10 March 2008	Tanger	Clay	(Spain) Iván Navarro	(Spain) Marc López (Spain) Gabriel Trujillo Soler	6–3, 6^{5}–7, [11–9]

==== Runners-up (3) ====
No.	Date	Tournament	Surface	Partner	Opponents	Score
1.	5 May 2008	Telde	Clay	(Spain) José Antonio Sánchez de Luna	(Spain) Daniel Gimeno Traver (Spain) Daniel Muñoz de la Nava	3–6, 1–6
2.	9 June 2008	Košice	Clay	(Spain) Carles Poch Gradin	(Poland) Tomasz Bednarek (Slovakia) Igor Zelenay	1–6, 6–4, [11–13]
3.	29 January 2012	Bucaramanga	Clay	(Italy) Paolo Lorenzi	(Uruguay) Ariel Behar (Argentina) Horacio Zeballos	4–6, 6–7^{(5–7)}
