= Gabriel Trujillo Soler =

Spanish tennis player (born 1979)

- Country (sports): Spain
- Residence: Barcelona, Spain
- Born: 30 September 1979 (age 46) Barcelona, Spain
- Plays: Right-handed
- Prize money: $242,179

Singles
- Career record: 1–1
- Career titles: 0
- Highest ranking: No. 209 (23 July 2007)

Doubles
- Career titles: 0
- Highest ranking: No. 151 (4 July 2005)

Gabriel Trujillo Soler (Spanish pronunciation: [ɡaˈβɾjel tɾuˈxiʎo soˈleɾ]; born 30 September 1979) is a Spanish professional tennis player.

== ATP tournaments finals ==
=== Singles (1 title, 1 runner-up) ===
Legend
ATP Challenger Series (1)

Result	W/L	Date	Tournament	Surface	Opponent	Score
Loss	0–1	5 Jul 2004	Budaors, Hungary	Clay	(Argentina) Ignacio González King	4–6, 4–6
Win	1–1	9 Jul 2007	Oberstaufen, Germany	Clay	(Germany) Philipp Petzschner	6–4, 6–4
