= 2007 ITF Men's Circuit =

Details

Achievements (singles)

The 2007 ITF Men's Circuit was the 2007 edition of the third-tier tour for men's professional tennis. It was organised by the International Tennis Federation and is a tier below the ATP Challenger Tour. The ITF Men's Circuit consisted of 499 'Futures' tournaments played year round across six continents, with prize money ranging from $10,000 to $15,000.

== Futures events ==
$15,000 tournaments
$10,000 tournaments

=== January ===
Tournament	Date	City	Surface	Singles champions	Doubles champions
Great Britain F1 Futures $15,000	January 8	Sheffield; Great Britain	Hard (i)	(Monaco) Thomas Oger	(Denmark) Rasmus Nørby (Denmark) Martin Pedersen
Spain F1 Futures $10,000	January 8	Menorca; Spain	Clay	(Spain) Adrián Menéndez Maceiras	(Spain) Guillem Burniol (Spain) Adrián Menéndez Maceiras
Germany F1 Futures $15,000	January 8	Nussloch; Germany	Carpet (i)	(Romania) Florin Mergea	(Germany) Philipp Marx (Romania) Florin Mergea
El Salvador F1 Futures $10,000	January 8	Santa Tecla, El Salvador; El Salvador	Clay	(Canada) Peter Polansky	(Mexico) Miguel Gallardo Valles (Mexico) Carlos Palencia
USA F1 Futures $10,000	January 8	Tampa; USA	Hard	(Switzerland) Michael Lammer	(India) Somdev Devvarman (Philippines) Treat Huey
Austria F1 Futures $10,000	January 15	Bergheim; Austria	Carpet (i)	(Czech Republic) Jan Vacek	(Austria) Martin Fischer (Austria) Philipp Oswald
Great Britain F2 Futures $15,000	January 15	Sunderland; Great Britain	Hard (i)	(France) Stéphane Robert	(France) Jean-François Bachelot (France) Stéphane Robert
Spain F2 Futures $10,000	January 15	Calvià; Spain	Clay	(Spain) Juan Albert Viloca	(Spain) Miguel Ángel López Jaén (Spain) David Marrero
Germany F2 Futures $10,000	January 15	Stuttgart; Germany	Hard (i)	(Czech Republic) Daniel Lustig	(Germany) David Klier (Germany) Daniel Müller
Guatemala F1 Futures $10,000	January 15	Guatemala; Guatemala	Hard	(Canada) Peter Polansky	(United States) Lester Cook (United States) Shane La Porte
USA F2 Futures $10,000	January 15	North Miami Beach, Florida; USA	Hard	(Mexico) Bruno Echagaray	(United States) Tim Smyczek (United States) Ryan Sweeting
France F1 Futures $10,000	January 22	Deauville; France	Clay (i)	(Netherlands) Matwé Middelkoop	(France) Julien Maes (Serbia) Petar Popović
Austria F2 Futures $10,000	January 22	Bergheim; Austria	Carpet (i)	(Austria) Martin Fischer	(Austria) Martin Fischer (Austria) Philipp Oswald
Spain F3 Futures $10,000	January 22	Palma de Mallorca; Spain	Hard	(Spain) Guillem Burniol	(Spain) Pedro Rico (Spain) Santiago Ventura
Germany F3 Futures $10,000	January 22	Kaarst; Germany	Carpet (i)	(Belgium) Jeroen Masson	(Belgium) Niels Desein (Belgium) Jeroen Masson
Panama F1 Futures $10,000	January 22	Panama; Panama	Clay	(Argentina) Juan-Pablo Villar	(Argentina) Juan-Pablo Amado (Bolivia) Mauricio Doria-Medina
Colombia F1 Futures $15,000	January 22	Manizales; Colombia	Clay	(Colombia) Carlos Salamanca	(Ecuador) Carlos Avellán (Argentina) Diego Álvarez
India F1 Futures $15,000	January 22	Kolkata; India	Clay	(Bulgaria) Todor Enev	(Kazakhstan) Alexey Kedryuk (Russia) Alexander Kudryavtsev
USA F3 Futures $10,000	January 22	Boca Raton, Florida; USA	Hard	(Argentina) Nicolás Todero	(United States) Joel Kielbowicz (United States) Ryan Stotland
Austria F3 Futures $10,000	January 29	Bergheim; Austria	Carpet (i)	(Slovenia) Marko Tkalec	(Austria) Martin Fischer (Austria) Philipp Oswald
France F2 Futures $10,000	January 29	Feucherolles; France	Hard (i)	(France) Nicolas Renavand	(France) Adrian Mannarino (France) Josselin Ouanna
Spain F4 Futures $10,000	January 29	Murcia; Spain	Clay	(Spain) David Marrero	(Spain) Jordi Marse-Vidri (Spain) Carles Poch Gradin
Germany F4 Futures $15,000	January 29	Mettmann; Germany	Carpet (i)	(Germany) Tobias Kamke	(Germany) Maximilian Abel (Switzerland) Stefan Kilchhofer
Costa Rica F1 Futures $10,000	January 29	San Jose; Costa Rica	Hard	(Canada) Peter Polansky	(United States) Patrick Briaud (United States) Donald Young
Colombia F2 Futures $15,000	January 29	Bucaramanga; Colombia	Clay	(Colombia) Michael Quintero	(Colombia) Juan Sebastián Cabal (Colombia) Carlos Salamanca
India F2 Futures $15,000	January 29	Delhi; India	Hard	(Russia) Alexander Kudryavtsev	(Kazakhstan) Alexey Kedryuk (Russia) Alexander Kudryavtsev

=== February ===
Tournament	Date	City	Surface	Singles champions	Doubles champions
France F3 Futures $10,000	February 5	Bressuire; France	Hard (i)	(France) Thierry Ascione	(France) Adrian Mannarino (France) Josselin Ouanna
Spain F5 Futures $10,000	February 5	Murcia; Spain	Clay	(Spain) Santiago Ventura	(Spain) Miguel Ángel López Jaén (Spain) David Marrero
Mexico F1 Futures $15,000	February 5	Mexico City; Mexico	Hard	(Mexico) Bruno Echagaray	(Mexico) Bruno Echagaray (Serbia) Alex Vlaški
Australia F1 Futures $15,000	February 12	Wollongong; Australia	Hard	(Australia) Robert Smeets	(United States) Alberto Francis (United States) Troy Hahn
Spain F6 Futures $10,000	February 12	Cartagena; Spain	Clay	(Netherlands) Matwé Middelkoop	(Serbia) David Savić (Argentina) Juan-Pablo Yunis
Great Britain F3 Futures $15,000	February 12	Barnstaple; Great Britain	Hard (i)	(France) Stéphane Robert	(Pakistan) Aisam-ul-Haq Qureshi (France) Stéphane Robert
Mexico F2 Futures $10,000	February 12	Mexico City; Mexico	Hard	(Spain) Óscar Burrieza	(Canada) Pierre-Ludovic Duclos (France) Pierrick Ysern
Italy F1 Futures $10,000	February 12	Bari; Italy	Clay (i)	(France) Éric Prodon	(Italy) Alberto Brizzi (Italy) Giancarlo Petrazzuolo
Croatia F1 Futures $15,000	February 12	Zagreb; Croatia	Hard (i)	(France) Gary Lugassy	(Croatia) Ivan Dodig (Czech Republic) Lukáš Rosol
Australia F2 Futures $15,000	February 19	Sydney; Australia	Hard	(Finland) Timo Nieminen	(Australia) Luke Bourgeois (Australia) Adam Feeney
Spain F7 Futures $10,000	February 19	Cartagena; Spain	Hard	(Spain) Adrián Menéndez Maceiras	(Belgium) Ruben Bemelmans (Belgium) Yannick Mertens
Great Britain F4 Futures $15,000	February 19	Exmouth; Great Britain	Carpet (i)	(France) Gary Lugassy	(Pakistan) Aisam-ul-Haq Qureshi (India) Purav Raja
Italy F2 Futures $15,000	February 19	Trento; Italy	Hard (i)	(Italy) Andrea Stoppini	(Russia) Dmitri Sitak (New Zealand) Artem Sitak
USA F4 Futures $15,000	February 19	Brownsville, Texas; USA	Hard	(New Zealand) Wesley Whitehouse	(United States) Nicholas Monroe (South Africa) Izak van der Merwe
Croatia F2 Futures $15,000	February 19	Zagreb; Croatia	Hard (i)	(Croatia) Vjekoslav Skenderovic	(Czech Republic) Jaroslav Pospíšil (Czech Republic) Jan Vacek
Italy F3 Futures $10,000	February 26	Castel Gandolfo; Italy	Clay	(Austria) Daniel Köllerer	(Italy) Giancarlo Petrazzuolo (Latvia) Deniss Pavlovs
Spain F8 Futures $10,000	February 26	Terrassa; Spain	Clay	(Spain) Javier Genaro-Martinez	(Spain) Antonio Baldellou-Esteva (Spain) Juan Albert Viloca
Portugal F1 Futures $10,000	February 26	Faro; Portugal	Hard	(Republic of Ireland) Louk Sorensen	(United Kingdom) Ian Flanagan (United Kingdom) Tom Rushby
New Zealand F1 Futures $15,000	February 26	Wellington; New Zealand	Hard	(South Korea) Im Kyu-tae	(Australia) Carsten Ball (Australia) Adam Feeney
Switzerland F1 Futures $10,000	February 26	Leuggern; Switzerland	Carpet (i)	(Georgia (country)) Lado Chikhladze	(Switzerland) Alexander Sadecky (Switzerland) Sven Swinnen
USA F5 Futures $15,000	February 26	Harlingen, Texas; USA	Hard	(Russia) Alex Bogomolov Jr.	(South Africa) Izak van der Merwe (New Zealand) Wesley Whitehouse
Nigeria F1 Futures $15,000	February 26	Benin City; Nigeria	Hard	(Togo) Komlavi Loglo	(India) Divij Sharan (India) Navdeep Singh

=== March ===
Tournament	Date	City	Surface	Singles champions	Doubles champions
Canada F1 Futures $10,000	March 5	Hull, Quebec; Canada	Hard (i)	(Italy) Adriano Biasella	(Germany) Thomas Schoeck (United States) Nathan Thompson
Switzerland F2 Futures $10,000	March 5	Vaduz; Liechtenstein	Carpet (i)	(Georgia (country)) Lado Chikhladze	(Switzerland) Alexander Sadecky (Switzerland) Sven Swinnen
Morocco F1 Futures $15,000	March 5	Oujda; Morocco	Clay	(Morocco) Younes El Aynaoui	(Argentina) Máximo González (Argentina) Damián Patriarca
Great Britain F5 Futures $15,000	March 5	Jersey; Great Britain	Hard (i)	(France) Gary Lugassy	(United Kingdom) Jamie Baker (Pakistan) Aisam-ul-Haq Qureshi
Italy F4 Futures $10,000	March 5	Siracusa; Italy	Clay	(Italy) Francesco Aldi	(Italy) Alberto Brizzi (Italy) Giancarlo Petrazzuolo
New Zealand F2 Futures $15,000	March 5	Hamilton; New Zealand	Hard	(New Zealand) Simon Rea	(United States) Jamie Cerretani (New Zealand) Daniel King-Turner
Spain F9 Futures $10,000	March 5	Sabadell; Spain	Clay	(Spain) Bartolomé Salvá Vidal	(Spain) Antonio Baldellou-Esteva (Spain) Miguel Ángel López Jaén
Israel F1 Futures $10,000	March 5	Ramat HaSharon; Israel	Hard	(Netherlands) Antal van der Duim	(Czech Republic) Jiří Krkoška (Slovakia) Jan Stancik
Portugal F2 Futures $10,000	March 5	Lagos; Portugal	Hard	(Netherlands) Peter Wessels	(Canada) Pierre-Ludovic Duclos (Belgium) Niels Desein
USA F6 Futures $15,000	March 5	McAllen, Texas; USA	Hard	(Canada) Peter Polansky	(United States) Patrick Briaud (United States) Lesley Joseph
Nigeria F2 Futures $15,000	March 5	Benin City; Nigeria	Hard	(Ghana) Henry Adjei-Darko	(India) Divij Sharan (India) Navdeep Singh
Australia F3 Futures $15,000	March 12	Sale, Victoria; Australia	Clay	(Greece) Vasilis Mazarakis	(Indonesia) Prima Simpatiaji (Indonesia) Bonit Wiryawan
Canada F2 Futures $10,000	March 12	Montreal; Canada	Hard (i)	(Canada) Frédéric Niemeyer	(India) Stephen Amritraj (United States) Peter Shults
Morocco F2 Futures $15,000	March 12	Rabat; Morocco	Clay	(Argentina) Máximo González	(Slovakia) Kamil Čapkovič (Slovakia) Pavol Červenák
Switzerland F3 Futures $10,000	March 12	Wilen; Switzerland	Carpet (i)	(France) Antony Dupuis	(Germany) Dustin Brown (Moldova) Roman Borvanov
France F4 Futures $15,000	March 12	Lille; France	Hard (i)	(Latvia) Andis Juška	(France) Grégory Carraz (France) Alexandre Sidorenko
Great Britain F6 Futures $15,000	March 12	Sunderland; Great Britain	Hard (i)	(United Kingdom) Jamie Baker	(United Kingdom) Jamie Baker (Pakistan) Aisam-ul-Haq Qureshi
Italy F5 Futures $15,000	March 12	Caltanissetta; Italy	Clay	(Italy) Giancarlo Petrazzuolo	(Czech Republic) Dušan Karol (Czech Republic) Filip Zeman
Spain F10 Futures $10,000	March 12	Badalona; Spain	Clay	(Spain) Bartolomé Salvá Vidal	(Spain) Marc Fornell Mestres (Spain) Jordi Marse-Vidri
Israel F2 Futures $10,000	March 12	Ramat HaSharon; Israel	Hard	(Slovakia) Jan Stancik	(United Kingdom) Chris Eaton (Israel) Amit Inbar
Portugal F3 Futures $10,000	March 12	Albufeira; Portugal	Hard	(Lithuania) Ričardas Berankis	(Canada) Pierre-Ludovic Duclos (Croatia) Franko Škugor
Croatia F3 Futures $10,000	March 12	Poreč; Croatia	Clay	(Croatia) Vjekoslav Skenderovic	(Russia) Mikhail Elgin (Russia) Alexandre Krasnoroutskiy
Ghana F1 Futures $15,000	March 12	Accra; Ghana	Clay	(North Macedonia) Predrag Rusevski	(Chile) Guillermo Hormazábal (Chile) Hans Podlipnik Castillo
Australia F4 Futures $15,000	March 19	Lyneham, ACT; Australia	Clay	(Australia) Alun Jones	(Australia) Rameez Junaid (Greece) Vasilis Mazarakis
Canada F3 Futures $10,000	March 19	Rock Forest; Canada	Hard (i)	(Canada) Frédéric Niemeyer	(Canada) Érik Chvojka (Canada) Vasek Pospisil
Japan F1 Futures $10,000	March 19	Nishitama; Japan	Hard	(South Korea) Im Kyu-tae	(China) Yu Xinyuan (China) Zeng Shaoxuan
France F5 Futures $15,000	March 19	Poitiers; France	Hard (i)	(France) Jo-Wilfried Tsonga	(Slovakia) Filip Polášek (Slovakia) Igor Zelenay
Italy F6 Futures $10,000	March 19	Catania; Italy	Clay	(Argentina) Juan-Pablo Villar	(Denmark) Frederik Nielsen (Denmark) Martin Pedersen
Spain F11 Futures $10,000	March 19	Sabadell; Spain	Clay	(Spain) Antonio Baldellou-Esteva	(Spain) Antonio Baldellou-Esteva (Spain) Jordi Marse-Vidri
Israel F3 Futures $10,000	March 19	Ra'anana; Israel	Hard	(Israel) Harel Levy	(France) Laurent Vigne (France) Pierrick Ysern
Croatia F4 Futures $10,000	March 19	Vrsar; Croatia	Clay	(Republic of Ireland) Conor Niland	(Russia) Mikhail Elgin (Russia) Alexandre Krasnoroutskiy
Ghana F2 Futures $15,000	March 19	Accra; Ghana	Clay	(North Macedonia) Predrag Rusevski	(North Macedonia) Lazar Magdinčev (North Macedonia) Predrag Rusevski
Japan F2 Futures $10,000	March 26	Nishitama; Japan	Hard	(South Korea) Im Kyu-tae	(China) Yu Xinyuan (China) Zeng Shaoxuan
Sweden F1 Futures $10,000	March 26	Malmö; Sweden	Hard (i)	(Sweden) Pablo Figueroa	(Poland) Robert Godlewski (Germany) David Klier
Great Britain F7 Futures $15,000	March 26	Bath; Great Britain	Hard (i)	(United Kingdom) Richard Bloomfield	(United Kingdom) Lee Childs (United Kingdom) Ross Hutchins
Italy F7 Futures $10,000	March 26	Monterotondo; Italy	Clay	(Denmark) Frederik Nielsen	(Argentina) Jonathan Gonzalia (Argentina) Juan-Pablo Villar
Spain F12 Futures $10,000	March 26	Zaragoza; Spain	Clay (i)	(Spain) David Marrero	(Spain) Miguel Ángel López Jaén (Spain) Jordi Marse-Vidri
Croatia F5 Futures $10,000	March 26	Rovinj; Croatia	Clay	(Slovenia) Marko Tkalec	(Croatia) Nikola Martinovic (Croatia) Joško Topić

=== April ===
Tournament	Date	City	Surface	Singles champions	Doubles champions
Sweden F2 Futures $10,000	April 2	Linköping; Sweden	Hard (i)	(Germany) Daniel Elsner	(Germany) Ralph Grambow (Germany) Philipp Marx
France F6 Futures $15,000	April 2	Angers; France	Clay (i)	(Belgium) Steve Darcis	(Germany) Dominik Meffert (Australia) Joseph Sirianni
Great Britain F8 Futures $15,000	April 2	Bath; Great Britain	Hard (i)	(Germany) Andreas Beck	(Australia) Luke Bourgeois (United Kingdom) Lee Childs
Spain F13 Futures $10,000	April 2	Loja; Spain	Clay	(Spain) Miguel Ángel López Jaén	(Spain) Miquel Perez Puigdomenech (Spain) José Antonio Sánchez de Luna
Turkey F1 Futures $10,000	April 2	Manavgat; Turkey	Clay	(Czech Republic) Jan Minář	(Romania) Artemon Apostu-Efremov (Romania) Alexandru-Raul Lazar
Italy F8 Futures $10,000	April 2	Frascati; Italy	Clay	(Argentina) Antonio Pastorino	(Italy) Enrico Iannuzzi (Romania) Bogdan Leonte
United Arab Emirates F1 Futures $15,000	April 2	Dubai; United Arab Emirates	Hard	(Pakistan) Aisam-ul-Haq Qureshi	(Australia) Rameez Junaid (Pakistan) Aisam-ul-Haq Qureshi
Japan F3 Futures $10,000	April 2	Akishima; Japan	Carpet	(Japan) Gouichi Motomura	(Japan) Masato Hatanaka (Japan) Masatoshi Miyazaki
Egypt F1 Futures $10,000	April 2	Cairo; Egypt	Clay	(Andorra) Laurent Recouderc	(Romania) Adrian Cruciat (Romania) Cătălin-Ionuț Gârd
Sweden F3 Futures $10,000	April 9	Norrköping; Sweden	Hard (i)	(Sweden) Carl Bergman	(Germany) Ralph Grambow (Germany) Philipp Marx
France F7 Futures $15,000	April 9	Grasse; France	Clay	(France) Antony Dupuis	(Czech Republic) Ladislav Chramosta (Austria) Martin Slanar
Turkey F2 Futures $10,000	April 9	Manavgat; Turkey	Clay	(Czech Republic) Jan Minář	(Belgium) Steve Darcis (Netherlands) Fred Hemmes
Russia F1 Futures $15,000	April 9	Moscow; Russia	Hard (i)	(Latvia) Andis Juška	(Belarus) Sergey Betov (Belarus) Vladimir Voltchkov
Italy F9 Futures $10,000	April 9	Livorno; Italy	Clay	(Italy) Manuel Jorquera	(Italy) Matteo Marrai (Italy) Walter Trusendi
USA F7 Futures $15,000	April 9	Mobile, Alabama; USA	Hard	(South Africa) Izak van der Merwe	(United States) Alberto Francis (United States) Lesley Joseph
United Arab Emirates F2 Futures $15,000	April 9	Dubai; United Arab Emirates	Hard	(Republic of Ireland) Louk Sorensen	(Australia) Rameez Junaid (Pakistan) Aisam-ul-Haq Qureshi
Egypt F2 Futures $10,000	April 9	Cairo; Egypt	Clay	(Andorra) Laurent Recouderc	(Romania) Adrian Gavrilă (Romania) Gabriel Moraru
Japan F4 Futures $10,000	April 9	Tokyo; Japan	Hard	(Japan) Gouichi Motomura	(Australia) Scott Doerner (United States) Minh Le
Italy F10 Futures $15,000	April 16	Cremona; Italy	Hard	(Spain) Gabriel Trujillo Soler	(Croatia) Ivan Cerović (Netherlands) Igor Sijsling
Turkey F3 Futures $10,000	April 16	Belek; Turkey	Clay	(Belgium) Steve Darcis	(Czech Republic) Dušan Karol (Belgium) Jeroen Masson
Spain F14 Futures $10,000	April 16	Melilla; Spain	Hard	(Spain) Guillermo Alcaide	(Spain) Luis Antonio Perez-Perez (Spain) Sergio Pérez Pérez
Russia F2 Futures $15,000	April 16	Tyumen; Russia	Hard (i)	(Austria) Martin Fischer	(Russia) Konstantin Kravchuk (Russia) Evgeny Kirillov
USA F8 Futures $15,000	April 16	Little Rock, Arkansas; USA	Hard	(United States) Donald Young	(Japan) Kei Nishikori (United States) Donald Young
Japan F5 Futures $10,000	April 16	Kofu; Japan	Carpet	(South Korea) Kwon Hyung-tae	(Japan) Akito Higa (Japan) Tomohiro Shinokawa
Egypt F3 Futures $10,000	April 16	Cairo; Egypt	Clay	(Romania) Cătălin-Ionuț Gârd	(Czech Republic) Daniel Lustig (Czech Republic) Filip Zeman
Argentina F1 Futures $10,000	April 23	Santa Fe; Argentina	Clay	(Argentina) Eduardo Schwank	(Argentina) Diego Cristin (Uruguay) Martín Vilarrubí
Korea Rep. F1 Futures $15,000	April 23	Seogwipo; Korea Rep.	Hard	(South Korea) An Jae-sung	(South Korea) Im Kyu-tae (Japan) Takahiro Terachi
Spain F15 Futures $10,000	April 23	Reus; Spain	Clay	(Spain) Miguel Ángel López Jaén	(Spain) David Marrero (Spain) Pablo Santos
Italy F11 Futures $10,000	April 23	Padova; Italy	Clay	(Argentina) Sebastián Decoud	(Argentina) Alejandro Fabbri (Spain) Gabriel Trujillo Soler
Italy F12 Futures $10,000	April 30	Piacenza; Italy	Clay	(Italy) Alessandro Da Col	(Argentina) Guillermo Carry (Argentina) Alejandro Fabbri
Romania F1 Futures $10,000	April 30	Bucharest; Romania	Clay	(Belgium) Niels Desein	(Belgium) Niels Desein (Belgium) Jeroen Masson
Great Britain F9 Futures $15,000	April 30	Bournemouth; Great Britain	Clay	(Andorra) Laurent Recouderc	(France) Olivier Charroin (United States) Jamie Cerretani
Spain F16 Futures $10,000	April 30	Vic; Spain	Clay	(Spain) Pedro Clar	(Spain) Pedro Clar (Spain) Ignacio Coll Riudavets
Korea Rep. F2 Futures $15,000	April 30	Daegu; Korea Rep.	Hard	(South Korea) Nam Hyun-woo	(China) Yu Xinyuan (China) Zeng Shaoxuan
USA F9 Futures $10,000	April 30	Vero Beach, Florida; USA	Clay	(France) Pierrick Ysern	(United States) Ryler DeHeart (United States) Christopher Lam
Argentina F2 Futures $10,000	April 30	Buenos Aires; Argentina	Clay	(Argentina) Eduardo Schwank	(Argentina) Demian Gschwend (Argentina) Eduardo Schwank
Colombia F3 Futures $15,000	April 30	Cali; Colombia	Clay	(Colombia) Michael Quintero	(Uruguay) Marcel Felder (Colombia) Pablo González

=== May ===
Tournament	Date	City	Surface	Singles champions	Doubles champions
Colombia F4 Futures $15,000	May 7	Pereira; Colombia	Clay	(Colombia) Juan Sebastián Cabal	(Uruguay) Marcel Felder (Colombia) Pablo González
Argentina F3 Futures $10,000	May 7	Tucumán; Argentina	Clay	(Argentina) Eduardo Schwank	(Argentina) Diego Cristin (Uruguay) Martín Vilarrubí
Czech Rep. F1 Futures $10,000	May 7	Teplice; Czech Republic	Clay	(Czech Republic) Lukáš Rosol	(Czech Republic) Roman Vögeli (Czech Republic) Karel Triska
Kuwait F1 Futures $15,000	May 7	Mishref; Kuwait	Hard	(Australia) Robert Smeets	(Pakistan) Aisam-ul-Haq Qureshi (India) Purav Raja
Mexico F3 Futures $10,000	May 7	Córdoba, Veracruz; Mexico	Hard	(United States) Nicholas Monroe	(Mexico) Miguel Gallardo Valles (Mexico) Carlos Palencia
USA F10 Futures $10,000	May 7	Orange Park, Florida; USA	Clay	(Italy) Stefano Ianni	(Italy) Adriano Biasella (Italy) Stefano Ianni
Brazil F3 Futures $10,000	May 7	São Paulo; Brazil	Clay	(Brazil) João Souza	(Brazil) Gabriel Pitta (Brazil) Henrique Pinto-Silva
Korea Rep. F3 Futures $15,000	May 7	Gimcheon; Korea Rep.	Hard	(Japan) Satoshi Iwabuchi	(South Korea) Im Kyu-tae (Japan) Takahiro Terachi
China F1 Futures $10,000	May 7	Tianjin; China P.R.	Hard	(New Zealand) Simon Rea	(Japan) Yaoki Ishii (Japan) Hiroki Kondo
Uzbekistan F1 Futures $15,000	May 7	Andijan; Uzbekistan	Hard	(Uzbekistan) Denis Istomin	(Russia) Pavel Chekhov (Russia) Victor Kozin
Romania F2 Futures $10,000	May 7	Bucharest; Romania	Clay	(Romania) Florin Mergea	(Romania) Petru-Alexandru Luncanu (Romania) Florin Mergea
Great Britain F10 Futures $15,000	May 7	Edinburgh; Great Britain	Clay	(France) Éric Prodon	(France) Olivier Charroin (France) Ludwig Pellerin
Spain F17 Futures $10,000	May 7	Lleida; Spain	Clay	(Spain) Juan Albert Viloca	(Spain) Miguel Ángel López Jaén (Spain) Carlos Rexach-Itoiz
Bulgaria F1 Futures $10,000	May 7	Sofia; Bulgaria	Clay	(Belgium) Maxime Authom	(Sweden) Carl Bergman (Sweden) Daniel Kumlin
Greece F1 Futures $10,000	May 7	Kos; Greece	Hard	(Kazakhstan) Syrym Abdukhalikov	(United States) Jamie Cerretani (Germany) Ralph Grambow
Bosnia & Herzegovina F1 Futures $10,000	May 7	Doboj; Bosnia and Herzegovina	Clay	(Latvia) Deniss Pavlovs	(Serbia) Boris Conkic (Latvia) Deniss Pavlovs
Italy F13 Futures $10,000	May 7	Vicenza; Italy	Clay	(Italy) Alberto Brizzi	(Italy) Riccardo Ghedin (Kazakhstan) Mikhail Kukushkin
Algeria F1 Futures $10,000	May 7	Algiers; Algeria	Clay	(Andorra) Laurent Recouderc	(Iran) Rouzbeh Kamran (United Kingdom) Edward Seator
Algeria F2 Futures $10,000	May 14	Algiers; Algeria	Clay	(Algeria) Lamine Ouahab	(Algeria) Lamine Ouahab (Algeria) Mohamed-Redha Ouahab
Colombia F5 Futures $15,000	May 14	Pasto; Colombia	Clay	(Colombia) Juan Sebastián Cabal	(Argentina) Guillermo Bujniewicz (Argentina) Damian Listingart
Italy F14 Futures $10,000	May 14	Pozzuoli; Italy	Clay	(Argentina) Antonio Pastorino	(Argentina) Alejandro Fabbri (Argentina) Antonio Pastorino
Belarus F1 Futures $15,000	May 14	Minsk; Belarus	Hard	(Russia) Alexander Kudryavtsev	(Belarus) Sergey Betov (Belarus) Vladimir Voltchkov
Romania F3 Futures $10,000	May 14	Pitești; Romania	Clay	(Romania) Cătălin-Ionuț Gârd	(Romania) Gabriel Moraru (Romania) Andrei Mlendea
Bosnia & Herzegovina F2 Futures $10,000	May 14	Sarajevo; Bosnia and Herzegovina	Clay	(North Macedonia) Predrag Rusevski	(North Macedonia) Lazar Magdinčev (North Macedonia) Predrag Rusevski
Spain F18 Futures $10,000	May 14	Balaguer; Spain	Clay	(Spain) Gabriel Trujillo Soler	(Spain) Miguel Ángel López Jaén (Spain) Carlos Rexach-Itoiz
Bulgaria F2 Futures $10,000	May 14	Rousse; Bulgaria	Clay	(Ukraine) Ivan Sergeyev	(Sweden) Carl Bergman (Sweden) Daniel Kumlin
Greece F2 Futures $10,000	May 14	Syros; Greece	Hard	(United Kingdom) Lee Childs	(United Kingdom) Lee Childs (United Kingdom) Edward Corrie
Uzbekistan F2 Futures $15,000	May 14	Namangan; Uzbekistan	Hard	(Czech Republic) Lukáš Rosol	(Czech Republic) Lukáš Rosol (Austria) Martin Slanar
China F2 Futures $10,000	May 14	Tianjin; China P.R.	Hard	(China) Sun Peng	(China) Gong Maoxin (China) Li Zhe
Brazil F4 Futures $15,000	May 14	Caldas Novas; Brazil	Hard	(Brazil) Caio Zampieri	(Brazil) Renato Silveira (Brazil) Caio Zampieri
USA F11 Futures $10,000	May 14	Tampa; USA	Clay	(Dominican Republic) Víctor Estrella Burgos	(Australia) Colin Ebelthite (Germany) Clinton Thomson
Mexico F4 Futures $10,000	May 14	Guadalajara; Mexico	Clay	(Mexico) Carlos Palencia	(Mexico) Miguel Gallardo Valles (Mexico) Carlos Palencia
Kuwait F2 Futures $15,000	May 14	Mishref; Kuwait	Hard	(Pakistan) Aisam-ul-Haq Qureshi	(Monaco) Thomas Oger (France) Nicolas Tourte
Czech Rep. F2 Futures $10,000	May 14	Most; Czech Republic	Clay	(Czech Republic) František Čermák	(France) Jean-Baptiste Perlant (France) Xavier Pujo
Poland F1 Futures $15,000	May 14	Katowice; Poland	Clay	(Australia) Rameez Junaid	(Slovakia) Kamil Čapkovič (Slovakia) Marek Semjan
Poland F2 Futures $10,000	May 21	Zabrze; Poland	Clay	(Poland) Dawid Olejniczak	(Austria) Andreas Haider-Maurer (Austria) Armin Sandbichler
Czech Rep. F3 Futures $10,000	May 21	Jablonec nad Nisou; Czech Republic	Clay	(Czech Republic) Jan Minář	(Czech Republic) Jan Masik (Czech Republic) Jaroslav Pospíšil
Mexico F5 Futures $10,000	May 21	Celaya; Mexico	Hard	(United States) Nicholas Monroe	(United States) Joel Kielbowicz (United States) Ryan Stotland
Brazil F5 Futures $10,000	May 21	Chapecó; Brazil	Clay	(Brazil) Thomaz Bellucci	(Brazil) André Miele (Brazil) João Souza
China F3 Futures $10,000	May 21	Beijing; China P.R.	Hard	(United States) Lesley Joseph	(China) Gong Maoxin (China) Li Zhe
Belarus F2 Futures $15,000	May 21	Minsk 2 Belarus	Hard	(Russia) Mikhail Elgin	(Russia) Alexander Kudryavtsev (Russia) Alexandre Krasnoroutskiy
Romania F4 Futures $10,000	May 21	Bucharest; Romania	Clay	(Germany) Alexander Flock	(Romania) Artemon Apostu-Efremov (Romania) Adrian Gavrilă
Bosnia & Herzegovina F3 Futures $10,000	May 21	Brčko; Bosnia and Herzegovina	Clay	(North Macedonia) Predrag Rusevski	(North Macedonia) Lazar Magdinčev (North Macedonia) Predrag Rusevski
Spain F19 Futures $10,000	May 21	Valldoreix; Spain	Clay	(Spain) Héctor Ruiz-Cadenas	(Spain) David Canudas-Fernandez (Spain) Carlos Rexach-Itoiz
Bulgaria F3 Futures $10,000	May 21	Pleven; Bulgaria	Clay	(Monaco) Jean-René Lisnard	(Germany) Pirmin Haenle (Bulgaria) Vasko Mladenov
Greece F3 Futures $10,000	May 21	Kalamata; Greece	Carpet	(Greece) Alexandros Jakupovic	(United States) Jamie Cerretani (Netherlands) Antal van der Duim
Italy F15 Futures $15,000	May 21	Parma; Italy	Clay	(Spain) Daniel Gimeno Traver	(Italy) Alberto Brizzi (Italy) Giancarlo Petrazzuolo
Algeria F3 Futures $10,000	May 21	Algiers; Algeria	Clay	(Morocco) Rabie Chaki	(Australia) Sam Groth (United Kingdom) Edward Seator
Italy F16 Futures $15,000	May 28	Cesena; Italy	Clay	(Sweden) Filip Prpic	(Argentina) Eduardo Schwank (Argentina) Cristian Villagrán
Romania F5 Futures $10,000	May 28	Bacău; Romania	Clay	(Romania) Artemon Apostu-Efremov	(Romania) Florin Mergea (Romania) Horia Tecău
Bosnia & Herzegovina F4 Futures $10,000	May 28	Prijedor; Bosnia and Herzegovina	Clay	(North Macedonia) Predrag Rusevski	(Spain) Cesar Ferrer-Victoria (Latvia) Deniss Pavlovs
Spain F20 Futures $10,000	May 28	Maspalomas; Spain	Clay	(Spain) Javier Genaro-Martinez	(Spain) Pedro Clar (Spain) Ignacio Coll Riudavets
Bulgaria F4 Futures $10,000	May 28	Sofia; Bulgaria	Clay	(Monaco) Jean-René Lisnard	(Serbia) David Savić (Serbia) Miljan Zekić
Slovenia F1 Futures $10,000	May 28	Krško; Slovenia	Clay	(France) Jonathan Dasnières de Veigy	(Slovenia) Luka Ocvirk (Slovenia) Ales Svigelj
Czech Rep. F4 Futures $10,000	May 28	Karlovy Vary; Czech Republic	Clay	(Czech Republic) Jaroslav Pospíšil	(Czech Republic) Dušan Karol (Czech Republic) Jaroslav Pospíšil
Ukraine F1 Futures $10,000	May 28	Cherkasy; Ukraine	Clay	(Moldova) Andrei Gorban	(Moldova) Andrei Gorban (Ukraine) Denys Molchanov
India F3 Futures $10,000	May 28	Chandigarh; India	Hard	(India) Prakash Amritraj	(India) Stephen Amritraj (India) Sunil-Kumar Sipaeya
Poland F3 Futures $10,000	May 28	Kraków; Poland	Clay	(France) Éric Prodon	(Sweden) Kalle Flygt (Kuwait) Mohammad Ghareeb

=== June ===
Tournament	Date	City	Surface	Singles champions	Doubles champions
Poland F4 Futures $10,000	June 4	Koszalin; Poland	Clay	(Poland) Dawid Olejniczak	(Sweden) Johan Brunström (Kuwait) Mohammad Ghareeb
Argentina F7 Futures $10,000	June 4	Villa María; Argentina	Clay	(Argentina) Damián Patriarca	(Argentina) Martín Alund (Argentina) Gaston-Arturo Grimolizzi
India F4 Futures $10,000	June 4	Dehradun; India	Hard	(India) Prakash Amritraj	(India) Stephen Amritraj (India) Mustafa Ghouse
Tunisia F1 Futures $10,000	June 4	Sousse; Tunisia	Clay	(Morocco) Mehdi Ziadi	(Morocco) Reda El Amrani (Morocco) Younès Rachidi
Ukraine F2 Futures $10,000	June 4	Cherkasy; Ukraine	Clay	(Moldova) Andrei Gorban	(Russia) Pavel Chekhov (Russia) Victor Kozin
Romania F6 Futures $10,000	June 4	Brașov; Romania	Clay	(Romania) Adrian Cruciat	(Egypt) Karim Maamoun (Italy) Federico Torresi
Macedonia F1 Futures $10,000	June 4	Skopje; Macedonia	Clay	(North Macedonia) Predrag Rusevski	(Bulgaria) Ilia Kushev (Bulgaria) Yordan Kanev
Spain F21 Futures $15,000	June 4	Puerto Cruz; Spain	Carpet	(Australia) Robert Smeets	(Australia) Andrew Coelho (Australia) Sam Groth
Turkey F4 Futures $10,000	June 4	Ankara; Turkey	Clay	(Germany) Alexander Satschko	(Israel) Dekel Valtzer (Israel) Amir Weintraub
Slovenia F2 Futures $10,000	June 4	Maribor; Slovenia	Clay	(Slovenia) Marko Tkalec	(Slovenia) Blaž Kavčič (Slovenia) Luka Ocvirk
Italy F17 Futures $10,000	June 4	Teramo; Italy	Clay	(Poland) Adam Chadaj	(Uruguay) Marcel Felder (Spain) Miquel Perez Puigdomenech
Thailand F1 Futures $10,000	June 4	Khonkaen; Thailand	Hard	(South Korea) An Jae-sung	(United States) Nathan Thompson (United States) Ryan Young
Thailand F2 Futures $10,000	June 11	Chiengmai; Thailand	Hard	(United States) Justin Diao Natale	(South Korea) Kwon Oh-hee (South Korea) Lee Chul-hee
Italy F18 Futures $10,000	June 11	Bassano; Italy	Clay	(Monaco) Benjamin Balleret	(Italy) Fabio Colangelo (Italy) Daniele Giorgini
Slovenia F3 Futures $10,000	June 11	Koper; Slovenia	Clay	(Croatia) Ivan Cerović	(Slovenia) Luka Ocvirk (Slovenia) Ales Svigelj
Belarus F3 Futures $15,000	June 11	Minsk; Belarus	Clay	(France) Éric Prodon	(Russia) Mikhail Elgin (Russia) Alexandre Krasnoroutskiy
Turkey F5 Futures $10,000	June 11	İzmir; Turkey	Hard	(Turkey) Marsel İlhan	(Israel) Dekel Valtzer (Israel) Amir Weintraub
Romania F7 Futures $10,000	June 11	Focșani; Romania	Clay	(Romania) Adrian Cruciat	(Romania) Raian Luchici (United States) Brett Ross
Macedonia F2 Futures $10,000	June 11	Skopje; Macedonia	Clay	(North Macedonia) Predrag Rusevski	(North Macedonia) Lazar Magdinčev (North Macedonia) Predrag Rusevski
Spain F22 Futures $10,000	June 11	La Palma; Spain	Hard	(Spain) Guillem Burniol	(Spain) David Canudas-Fernandez (Spain) Carlos Rexach-Itoiz
Germany F5 Futures $15,000	June 11	Ingolstadt; Germany	Clay	(Spain) Daniel Gimeno Traver	(Czech Republic) Jaroslav Pospíšil (Austria) Martin Slanar
Norway F1 Futures $10,000	June 11	Gausdal; Norway	Hard	(Denmark) Martin Pedersen	(Norway) Stian Boretti (Norway) Erling Tveit
USA F12 Futures $15,000	June 11	Loomis, California; USA	Hard	(United States) Scoville Jenkins	(Mexico) Miguel Gallardo Valles (Mexico) Carlos Palencia
Japan F6 Futures $15,000	June 11	Kusatsu; Japan	Carpet	(United States) Lester Cook	(United States) Lester Cook (United States) Shane La Porte
Ukraine F3 Futures $10,000	June 11	Cherkasy; Ukraine	Clay	(Ukraine) Ivan Sergeyev	(Kazakhstan) Aleksandr Nedovyesov (Latvia) Deniss Pavlovs
Tunisia F2 Futures $10,000	June 11	Hammamet; Tunisia	Clay	(Morocco) Reda El Amrani	(Egypt) Motaz Abou El Khair (Morocco) Rabie Chaki
India F5 Futures $10,000	June 11	Delhi; India	Hard	(India) Prakash Amritraj	(India) Tushar Liberhan (India) Sanam Singh
Argentina F8 Futures $10,000	June 11	Ospaca; Argentina	Clay	(Argentina) Juan-Pablo Amado	(Argentina) Martín Alund (Argentina) Nicolas Jara-Lozano
Argentina F9 Futures $10,000	June 18	Ospaca; Argentina	Clay	(Argentina) Juan-Martín Aranguren	(Argentina) Jonathan Gonzalia (Argentina) Juan-Pablo Villar
Tunisia F3 Futures $10,000	June 18	Carthage; Tunisia	Clay	(Morocco) Rabie Chaki	(Egypt) Motaz Abou El Khair (Morocco) Rabie Chaki
Japan F7 Futures $15,000	June 18	Karuizawa; Japan	Clay	(New Zealand) Daniel King-Turner	(Japan) Hiroki Kondo (Japan) Takahiro Terachi
Serbia F1 Futures $10,000	June 18	Belgrade; Serbia	Clay	(Serbia) Ivan Bjelica	(Spain) Mariano Albert-Ferrando (Spain) Guillermo Olaso
USA F13 Futures $15,000	June 18	Sacramento, California; USA	Hard	(South Africa) Kevin Anderson	(Australia) Sadik Kadir (Australia) Adam Kennedy
China F4 Futures $15,000	June 18	Guangzhou; China P.R.	Hard	(South Korea) Im Kyu-tae	(Chinese Taipei) Lee Hsin-han (Chinese Taipei) Yang Tsung-hua
Ireland F1 Futures $15,000	June 18	Dublin; Ireland	Carpet	(Australia) Colin Ebelthite	(Australia) Raphael Durek (Canada) Pierre-Ludovic Duclos
Belarus F4 Futures $15,000	June 18	Minsk; Belarus	Clay	(Latvia) Deniss Pavlovs	(Russia) Mikhail Elgin (Russia) Alexandre Krasnoroutskiy
Netherlands F1 Futures $15,000	June 18	Alkmaar; Netherlands	Clay	(Netherlands) Nick van der Meer	(Netherlands) Romano Frantzen (Netherlands) Nick van der Meer
France F8 Futures $15,000	June 18	Blois; France	Clay	(Spain) Daniel Muñoz de la Nava	(France) Adrian Mannarino (France) Josselin Ouanna
Romania F8 Futures $10,000	June 18	Bucharest; Romania	Clay	(Romania) Cătălin-Ionuț Gârd	(Estonia) Mait Künnap (Italy) Federico Torresi
Spain F23 Futures $15,000	June 18	Tenerife; Spain	Hard	(Spain) Pere Riba	(Togo) Komlavi Loglo (Spain) Pere Riba
Germany F6 Futures $10,000	June 18	Marburg; Germany	Clay	(Hungary) Kornél Bardóczky	(Hungary) Kornél Bardóczky (Hungary) Dénes Lukács
Turkey F6 Futures $10,000	June 18	Enka; Turkey	Hard	(Israel) Dekel Valtzer	(Israel) Dekel Valtzer (Israel) Amir Weintraub
Norway F2 Futures $10,000	June 18	Gausdal; Norway	Hard	(Denmark) Rasmus Nørby	(Denmark) Jacob Melskens (Denmark) Rasmus Nørby
Italy F19 Futures $15,000	June 18	L'Aquila; Italy	Clay	(Austria) Andreas Haider-Maurer	(Romania) Artemon Apostu-Efremov (Romania) Adrian Gavrilă
Thailand F3 Futures $10,000	June 18	Bangkok; Thailand	Hard	(United States) Nathan Thompson	(South Korea) Kwon Oh-hee (South Korea) Lee Chul-hee
USA F15 Futures $10,000	June 25	Rochester, New York; USA	Clay	(United States) Nicholas Monroe	(United States) Todd Paul (United States) Cory Parr
Netherlands F2 Futures $15,000	June 25	Breda; Netherlands	Clay	(Germany) Clinton Thomson	(Belgium) Niels Desein (Belgium) Jeroen Masson
France F9 Futures $15,000	June 25	Toulon; France	Clay	(Spain) David Marrero	(France) Augustin Gensse (Spain) David Marrero
Romania F9 Futures $10,000	June 25	Craiova; Romania	Clay	(Romania) Cătălin-Ionuț Gârd	(Romania) Cosmin Cotet (Romania) Bogdan Leonte
Italy F20 Futures $10,000	June 25	Castelfranco; Italy	Clay	(Austria) Max Raditschnigg	(Italy) Enrico Iannuzzi (Italy) Matteo Volante
Spain F24 Futures $10,000	June 25	Málaga; Spain	Clay	(Spain) Roberto Bautista Agut	(Portugal) Rui Machado (Portugal) Gonçalo Nicau
Germany F7 Futures $10,000	June 25	Trier; Germany	Clay	(Germany) Andreas Beck	(Germany) Andreas Beck (Germany) Marcel Zimmermann
Norway F3 Futures $10,000	June 25	Oslo; Norway	Clay	(Sweden) Johan Brunström	(Sweden) Ervin Eleskovic (Kuwait) Mohammad Ghareeb
Ireland F2 Futures $15,000	June 25	Limerick; Ireland	Carpet	(France) Gary Lugassy	(Denmark) Rasmus Nørby (Denmark) Martin Pedersen
China F5 Futures $15,000	June 25	Shenzhen; China P.R.	Hard	(United States) Phillip King	(China) Yu Xinyuan (China) Zeng Shaoxuan
USA F14 Futures $15,000	June 25	Shingle Springs, California; USA	Hard	(United States) John Isner	(South Africa) Izak van der Merwe (New Zealand) Wesley Whitehouse
Serbia F2 Futures $10,000	June 25	Belgrade; Serbia	Clay	(Serbia) Darko Mađarovski	(Serbia) Vladimir Obradović (Montenegro) Goran Tošić
Morocco F3 Futures $10,000	June 25	Kenitra; Morocco	Clay	(Morocco) Mounir El Aarej	(Lebanon) Bassam Beidas (Egypt) Mahmoud Bahaa Hamed

=== July ===
Tournament	Date	City	Surface	Singles champions	Doubles champions
USA F16 Futures $10,000	July 2	Pittsburgh; USA	Clay	(United States) Rhyne Williams	(Australia) Carsten Ball (Australia) Scott Doerner
Morocco F4 Futures $10,000	July 2	Rabat; Morocco	Clay	(Spain) Cesar Ferrer Victoria	(Tunisia) Haythem Abid (Tunisia) Walid Jallali
Spain F25 Futures $15,000	July 2	Alicante; Spain	Clay	(Spain) José Antonio Sánchez de Luna	(Spain) Miquel Perez Puigdomenech (Spain) José Antonio Sánchez de Luna
Romania F10 Futures $10,000	July 2	Balș; Romania	Clay	(Romania) Victor Stanica	(Ukraine) Vladyslav Klymenko (Ukraine) Artem Smirnov
Italy F21 Futures $15,000	July 2	Bologna; Italy	Clay	(Argentina) Cristian Villagrán	(Bosnia and Herzegovina) Ismar Gorčić (Italy) Matteo Volante
Austria F4 Futures $10,000	July 2	Vandans; Austria	Clay	(Czech Republic) Jan Masik	(Austria) Philipp Oswald (Austria) Armin Sandbichler
Germany F8 Futures $15,000	July 2	Kassel; Germany	Clay	(Argentina) Nicolás Todero	(Germany) Philipp Marx (Germany) Lars Pörschke
Austria F5 Futures $10,000	July 9	Telfs; Austria	Clay	(Austria) Thomas Schiessling	(Austria) Andreas Haider-Maurer (Austria) Armin Sandbichler
France F10 Futures $15,000	July 9	Bourg-en-Bresse; France	Clay	(France) Benoît Paire	(France) Jean-Baptiste Perlant (France) Xavier Pujo
Italy F22 Futures $10,000	July 9	Carpi; Italy	Clay	(Argentina) Cristian Villagrán	(Italy) Matteo Marrai (Italy) Walter Trusendi
Spain F26 Futures $15,000	July 9	Elche; Spain	Clay	(Germany) Tony Holzinger	(Spain) Mariano Albert-Ferrando (Spain) Guillermo Olaso
Great Britain F11 Futures $15,000	July 9	Felixstowe; Great Britain	Grass	(Australia) Alun Jones	(United Kingdom) Josh Goodall (United Kingdom) Tom Rushby
Germany F9 Futures $10,000	July 9	Römerberg; Germany	Clay	(Germany) Dustin Brown	(Germany) Andre Begemann (Germany) Lars Pörschke
Morocco F5 Futures $10,000	July 9	Khemisset; Morocco	Clay	(Hong Kong) Karan Rastogi	(Morocco) Anas Fattar (Morocco) Mehdi Ziadi
Iran F1 Futures $15,000	July 9	Tehran; Iran	Clay	(Slovakia) Jan Stancik	(India) Rohan Gajjar (India) Aditya Madkekar
USA F17 Futures $10,000	July 9	Peoria, Illinois; USA	Clay	(United States) Michael Yani	(United States) Troy Hahn (United States) Vahid Mirzadeh
Romania F11 Futures $10,000	July 9	Bucharest; Romania	Clay	(Ukraine) Artem Smirnov	(Romania) Petru-Alexandru Luncanu (Romania) Horia Tecău
Italy F23 Futures $10,000	July 16	Palazzolo; Italy	Clay	(Argentina) Cristian Villagrán	(Italy) Matteo Marrai (Italy) Walter Trusendi
Spain F27 Futures $10,000	July 16	Gandia; Spain	Clay	(Spain) Guillermo Olaso	(Spain) Pablo Santos (Spain) Juan-Miguel Such-Perez
Great Britain F12 Futures $15,000	July 16	Frinton; Great Britain	Grass	(France) Julien Maes	(United Kingdom) Neil Bamford (United Kingdom) Tom Rushby
Germany F10 Futures $10,000	July 16	Espelkamp; Germany	Clay	(Belgium) Ruben Bemelmans	(Germany) Andre Begemann (Belgium) Ruben Bemelmans
Armenia F1 Futures $15,000	July 16	Yerevan; Armenia	Hard	(Republic of Ireland) Peter Clarke	(Czech Republic) Jiří Krkoška (Slovakia) Michal Pazicky
Romania F12 Futures $10,000	July 16	Târgu Mureş; Romania	Clay	(Romania) Cătălin-Ionuț Gârd	(Romania) Gabriel Moraru (Romania) Andrei Mlendea
USA F18 Futures $10,000	July 16	Joplin, Missouri; USA	Hard	(South Africa) Izak van der Merwe	(Russia) Andrey Kumantsov (United States) Conor Pollock
Iran F2 Futures $15,000	July 16	Tehran; Iran	Clay	(Czech Republic) Adam Vejmelka	(Monaco) Clément Morel (France) Charles Roche
Austria F6 Futures $10,000	July 16	Kramsach; Austria	Clay	(Austria) Philipp Oswald	(Austria) Philipp Oswald (Austria) Armin Sandbichler
France F11 Futures $15,000	July 16	Saint-Gervais; France	Clay	(France) Éric Prodon	(France) Jonathan Eysseric (France) Adrian Mannarino
India F6 Futures $10,000	July 23	Chennai; India	Clay	(India) Vijay Kannan	(India) Jeevan Nedunchezhiyan (India) Vivek Shokeen
USA F19 Futures $10,000	July 23	Godfrey, Illinois; USA	Hard	(Australia) Carsten Ball	(Australia) Carsten Ball (United States) Joel Kielbowicz
Senegal F1 Futures $10,000	July 23	Dakar; Senegal	Hard	(France) Rudy Coco	(Togo) Komlavi Loglo (Ivory Coast) Valentin Sanon
Italy F24 Futures $15,000	July 23	Modena; Italy	Clay	(Argentina) Cristian Villagrán	(Italy) Thomas Fabbiano (Belarus) Andrei Karatchenia
Spain F28 Futures $10,000	July 23	Dénia; Spain	Clay	(Germany) Tony Holzinger	(Spain) Pablo Santos (Spain) Juan-Miguel Such-Perez
Georgia F1 Futures $15,000	July 23	Tbilisi; Georgia	Hard	(Georgia (country)) Lado Chikhladze	(Czech Republic) Jiří Krkoška (Czech Republic) Daniel Lustig
Romania F13 Futures $10,000	July 23	Mediaș; Romania	Clay	(Romania) Cătălin-Ionuț Gârd	(Romania) Adrian Gavrilă (Romania) Marcel-Ioan Miron
Austria F7 Futures $15,000	July 30	Altenstadt; Austria	Clay	(Germany) Andreas Beck	(Austria) Martin Fischer (Austria) Philipp Oswald
Italy F25 Futures $10,000	July 30	Imperia; Italy	Clay	(Italy) Alberto Giraudo	(Italy) Matteo Marrai (Italy) Walter Trusendi
Hungary F1 Futures $10,000	July 30	Budapest; Hungary	Clay	(France) Jonathan Dasnières de Veigy	(Hungary) Gergely Kisgyörgy (Hungary) Sebő Kiss
Romania F14 Futures $10,000	July 30	Iași; Romania	Clay	(Romania) Andrei Mlendea	(Romania) Artemon Apostu-Efremov (Romania) Adrian Gavrilă
Spain F29 Futures $10,000	July 30	Xàtiva; Spain	Clay	(Spain) Roberto Bautista Agut	(Spain) Miquel Perez Puigdomenech (Spain) Sergio Pérez Pérez
Great Britain F13 Futures $15,000	July 30	Ilkley; Great Britain	Grass	(Australia) Adam Feeney	(United Kingdom) Ian Flanagan (United Kingdom) Brydan Klein
Germany F11 Futures $10,000	July 30	Wetzlar; Germany	Clay	(Germany) Alexander Flock	(Mexico) Fernando Cabrera (Germany) Gerhard Fahlke
Latvia F1 Futures $10,000	July 30	Jūrmala; Latvia	Clay	(Spain) Carles Poch Gradin	(Czech Republic) Dušan Karol (Russia) Mikhail Vasiliev
Georgia F2 Futures $15,000	July 30	Tbilisi; Georgia	Hard	(Georgia (country)) Lado Chikhladze	(Kazakhstan) Syrym Abdukhalikov (Belarus) Sergey Betov
Senegal F2 Futures $10,000	July 30	Dakar; Senegal	Hard	(Togo) Komlavi Loglo	(Israel) Idan Mark (Israel) Saar Steele
Peru F1 Futures $10,000	July 30	Lima; Peru	Clay	(Argentina) Alejandro Kon	(El Salvador) Rafael Arévalo (Venezuela) Roberto Maytín
USA F20 Futures $10,000	July 30	Decatur, Illinois; USA	Hard	(United States) Ryler DeHeart	(United States) Joel Kielbowicz (United States) Conor Pollock
India F7 Futures $10,000	July 30	New Delhi; India	Hard	(China) Sun Peng	(India) Vijay Kannan (India) Ashutosh Singh
Indonesia F1 Futures $10,000	July 30	Makassar; Indonesia	Hard	(South Korea) Lee Seung-hoon	(South Korea) Kwon Oh-hee (South Korea) Lee Chul-hee
Argentina F10 Futures $10,000	July 30	Corrientes; Argentina	Clay	(Argentina) Juan-Martín Aranguren	(Argentina) Diego López (Argentina) Lionel Noviski

=== August ===
Tournament	Date	City	Surface	Singles champions	Doubles champions
Argentina F11 Futures $10,000	August 6	Santa Fe; Argentina	Clay	(Argentina) Diego Veronelli	(Argentina) Federico Cavallero (Argentina) Valentin Florez
Indonesia F2 Futures $10,000	August 6	Semarang; Indonesia	Hard	(South Korea) Kwon Oh-hee	(Japan) Hiroki Kondo (Japan) Takahiro Terachi
India F8 Futures $10,000	August 6	Ludhiana (Jassowal); India	Hard	(Pakistan) Aqeel Khan	(India) Purav Raja (India) Vivek Shokeen
Slovak Rep. F1 Futures $10,000	August 6	Žilina; Slovakia	Clay	(Slovakia) Marek Semjan	(Czech Republic) Jakub Čech (Czech Republic) Filip Zeman
USA F21 Futures $10,000	August 6	Milwaukee, Wisconsin; USA	Hard	(Australia) Matthew Ebden	(Brazil) Rodrigo-Antonio Grilli (United States) Conor Pollock
Peru F2 Futures $10,000	August 6	Lima; Peru	Clay	(Peru) Matías Silva	(Peru) Mauricio Echazú (Peru) Matías Silva
Cameroon F1 Futures $10,000	August 6	Yaoundé; Cameroon	Hard	(Togo) Komlavi Loglo	(Ghana) Salifu Mohammed (Ghana) Menford Owusu
Romania F15 Futures $10,000	August 6	Hunedoara; Romania	Clay	(Romania) Artemon Apostu-Efremov	(Romania) Adrian Gavrilă (Romania) Marcel-Ioan Miron
Austria F8 Futures $15,000	August 6	Irdning; Austria	Clay	(Austria) Andreas Haider-Maurer	(Austria) Philipp Oswald (Austria) Christoph Steiner
Italy F26 Futures $10,000	August 6	Avezzano; Italy	Clay	(Russia) Valery Rudnev	(Italy) Massimo Capone (Italy) Luca Vanni
Spain F30 Futures $10,000	August 6	Bakio; Spain	Hard	(Germany) Tony Holzinger	(China) Gong Maoxin (China) Xu Junchao
Great Britain F14 Futures $15,000	August 6	Wrexham; Great Britain	Hard	(Australia) Robert Smeets	(United Kingdom) Chris Eaton (France) Pierrick Ysern
Germany F12 Futures $10,000	August 6	Essen; Germany	Clay	(Hungary) Kornél Bardóczky	(Germany) Andre Begemann (Germany) Benedikt Stronk
Lithuania F1 Futures $10,000	August 6	Vilnius; Lithuania	Clay	(France) Nicolas Coutelot	(United States) Ikaika Jobe (Germany) Thomas Schoeck
Poland F5 Futures $10,000	August 6	Olsztyn; Poland	Clay	(Hungary) György Balázs	(Poland) Mateusz Kowalczyk (Poland) Błażej Koniusz
Serbia F3 Futures $10,000	August 6	Sombor; Serbia	Clay	(Serbia) David Savić	(Serbia) Dusan Mihailovic (Serbia) David Savić
Russia F3 Futures $15,000	August 13	Moscow; Russia	Clay	(Russia) Mikhail Elgin	(Russia) Mikhail Elgin (Kazakhstan) Alexey Kedryuk
Romania F16 Futures $10,000	August 13	Arad; Romania	Clay	(Romania) Marius Copil	(Argentina) Martín Alund (Romania) Raian Luchici
Italy F27 Futures $15,000	August 13	Bolzano; Italy	Clay	(Argentina) Diego Junqueira	(Netherlands) Antal van der Duim (Netherlands) Boy Westerhof
Spain F31 Futures $15,000	August 13	Irun; Spain	Clay	(Algeria) Slimane Saoudi	(Spain) David Díaz-Ventura (Spain) Gerard Granollers
Slovak Rep. F2 Futures $10,000	August 13	Piešťany; Slovakia	Clay	(France) Jonathan Dasnières de Veigy	(Italy) Luca Rovetta (Italy) Matteo Volante
Germany F13 Futures $10,000	August 13	Unterföhring; Germany	Clay	(Georgia (country)) Lado Chikhladze	(Germany) David Klier (Germany) Philipp Piyamongkol
Poland F6 Futures $10,000	August 13	Szczecin; Poland	Clay	(Germany) Marc-Andre Stratling	(Poland) Grzegorz Panfil (France) Charles Roche
Lithuania F2 Futures $10,000	August 13	Vilnius; Lithuania	Clay	(France) Nicolas Coutelot	(Czech Republic) Dušan Karol (Finland) Juho Paukku
Croatia F6 Futures $10,000	August 13	Vinkovci; Croatia	Clay	(Croatia) Albert Loncaric	(Spain) Adolfo Gomez Pinter (Croatia) Krešimir Ritz
Serbia F4 Futures $10,000	August 13	Novi Sad; Serbia	Clay	(Serbia) Vladimir Obradović	(North Macedonia) Lazar Magdinčev (Montenegro) Goran Tošić
Venezuela F1 Futures $15,000	August 13	Valencia; Venezuela	Hard	(Mexico) Santiago González	(Mexico) Santiago González (Mexico) Daniel Garza
Peru F3 Futures $10,000	August 13	Arequipa; Peru	Clay	(Italy) Luigi D'Agord	(Argentina) Facundo Bagnis (Peru) Sergio Galdós
Indonesia F3 Futures $10,000	August 13	Jakarta; Indonesia	Hard	(South Africa) Raven Klaasen	(Chinese Taipei) Chang Huai-en (Chinese Taipei) Peng Hsien-yin
Argentina F12 Futures $10,000	August 13	Buenos Aires; Argentina	Clay	(Argentina) Lionel Noviski	(Argentina) Demian Gschwend (Argentina) Andrés Molteni
Argentina F13 Futures $10,000	August 20	Neuquén; Argentina	Clay	(Brazil) Daniel Dutra da Silva	(Brazil) Andre Pinheiro (Brazil) Daniel Dutra da Silva
Bulgaria F5 Futures $10,000	August 20	Varna; Bulgaria	Clay	(Bulgaria) Todor Enev	(Romania) Bogdan Leonte (Germany) Peter Torebko
Venezuela F2 Futures $15,000	August 20	Valencia; Venezuela	Hard	(Venezuela) Yohny Romero	(Venezuela) Piero Luisi (Venezuela) David Navarrete
Ecuador F1 Futures $10,000	August 20	Guayaquil; Ecuador	Hard	(United States) Justin Diao Natale	(Peru) Mauricio Echazú (Peru) Matías Silva
Netherlands F4 Futures $15,000	August 20	Vlaardingen; Netherlands	Clay	(Netherlands) Nick van der Meer	(Netherlands) Thiemo de Bakker (Netherlands) Igor Sijsling
Russia F4 Futures $15,000	August 20	Moscow; Russia	Clay	(Belarus) Vladimir Voltchkov	(Russia) Alexandre Krasnoroutskiy (Ukraine) Denys Molchanov
Austria F9 Futures $10,000	August 20	Vienna; Austria	Clay	(Germany) Marc Meigel	(Czech Republic) Dušan Karol (Austria) Patrick Schmölzer
Romania F17 Futures $10,000	August 20	Oradea; Romania	Clay	(Romania) Andrei Mlendea	(Romania) Marcel-Ioan Miron (Romania) Andrei Mlendea
Italy F28 Futures $15,000	August 20	Este; Italy	Clay	(Romania) Adrian Ungur	(Argentina) Diego Álvarez (Argentina) Diego Junqueira
Spain F32 Futures $15,000	August 20	Santander; Spain	Clay	(Spain) Miguel Ángel López Jaén	(Spain) Pablo Santos (Spain) Juan-Miguel Such-Perez
Great Britain F15 Futures $15,000	August 20	Cumberland; Great Britain	Hard	(Monaco) Thomas Oger	(India) Purav Raja (India) Sunil-Kumar Sipaeya
Germany F14 Futures $15,000	August 20	Wahlstedt; Germany	Clay	(Germany) Andreas Beck	(Germany) Tobias Kamke (Germany) Julian Reister
Finland F1 Futures $15,000	August 20	Helsinki; Finland	Hard	(Czech Republic) Daniel Lustig	(United States) Ikaika Jobe (United States) Ryan Stotland
Poland F7 Futures $15,000	August 20	Poznań; Poland	Clay	(Spain) Carles Poch Gradin	(Czech Republic) David Novak (Czech Republic) Martin Vacek
Slovak Rep. F3 Futures $10,000	August 20	Bratislava; Slovakia	Clay	(Slovakia) Filip Polášek	(Slovakia) Filip Polášek (Slovakia) Igor Zelenay
Croatia F7 Futures $10,000	August 20	Čakovec; Croatia	Clay	(Croatia) Marin Bradarić	(Croatia) Joško Topić (Croatia) Vilim Visak
Serbia F5 Futures $10,000	August 20	Subotica; Serbia	Clay	(Montenegro) Goran Tošić	(North Macedonia) Lazar Magdinčev (Montenegro) Goran Tošić
Netherlands F5 Futures $15,000	August 27	Enschede; Netherlands	Clay	(Netherlands) Nick van der Meer	(Netherlands) Michel Koning (Netherlands) Matwé Middelkoop
Switzerland F4 Futures $10,000	August 27	Crissier; Switzerland	Clay	(Czech Republic) Martin Vacek	(Australia) Yuri Bezeruk (France) Olivier Charroin
Austria F10 Futures $10,000	August 27	Pörtschach; Austria	Clay	(Austria) Christian Magg	(Austria) Max Raditschnigg (Austria) Patrick Schmölzer
Romania F18 Futures $10,000	August 27	Bucharest; Romania	Clay	(Romania) Adrian Cruciat	(Romania) Petru-Alexandru Luncanu (Italy) Federico Torresi
Italy F29 Futures $10,000	August 27	Piombino; Italy	Hard	(Italy) Francesco Piccari	(Italy) Riccardo Ghedin (Italy) Enrico Iannuzzi
Spain F33 Futures $15,000	August 27	Oviedo; Spain	Clay	(Spain) Pablo Santos	(Spain) Sergio Pérez Pérez (Spain) Pablo Santos
Great Britain F16 Futures $15,000	August 27	Foxhills; Great Britain	Hard	(Japan) Satoshi Iwabuchi	(United Kingdom) Ken Skupski (United Kingdom) Rob Searle
Poland F8 Futures $10,000	August 27	Opole; Poland	Clay	(Spain) Carles Poch Gradin	(Poland) Mateusz Kowalczyk (Poland) Błażej Koniusz
Finland F2 Futures $10,000	August 27	Vierumäki; Finland	Clay	(Finland) Juho Paukku	(Finland) Sami Huurinainen (Finland) Lauri Kiiski
Croatia F8 Futures $10,000	August 27	Mali Lošinj; Croatia	Clay	(Croatia) Antonio Veić	(Croatia) Vilim Visak (Croatia) Antonio Veić
Ecuador F2 Futures $10,000	August 27	Guayaquil; Ecuador	Hard	(United States) Bryan Koniecko	(Chile) Borja Malo (Chile) Hans Podlipnik Castillo
Bulgaria F6 Futures $10,000	August 27	Bourgas; Bulgaria	Clay	(Bulgaria) Todor Enev	(Belarus) Sergey Betov (Bulgaria) Vasko Mladenov
Argentina F14 Futures $10,000	August 27	Bahía Blanca; Argentina	Clay	(Argentina) Alejandro Fabbri	(Argentina) Alejandro Fabbri (Argentina) Damián Patriarca
Egypt F6 Futures $10,000	August 27	Heliopolis; Egypt	Clay	(Spain) Christian Ramos	(Egypt) Karim Maamoun (Egypt) Mohamed Mamoun
Russia F5 Futures $10,000	August 27	Sochi; Russia	Clay	(Russia) Dmitry Vlasov	(Russia) Mikhail Elgin (Russia) Ervand Gasparyan

=== September ===
Tournament	Date	City	Surface	Singles champions	Doubles champions
Sweden F4 Futures $15,000	September 3	Gothenburg; Sweden	Hard (i)	(Finland) Juho Paukku	(United Kingdom) Josh Goodall (United Kingdom) Tom Rushby
Russia F6 Futures $15,000	September 3	Sergiyev Posad; Russia	Clay	(Russia) Pavel Chekhov	(Russia) Pavel Chekhov (Russia) Victor Kozin
Egypt F7 Futures $10,000	September 3	Cairo; Egypt	Clay	(Egypt) Sherif Sabry	(Egypt) Mohamed Mamoun (Egypt) Sherif Sabry
Brazil F12 Futures $10,000	September 3	Criciúma; Brazil	Clay	(Brazil) Franco Ferreiro	(Brazil) Lucas Engel (Brazil) Franco Ferreiro
Argentina F15 Futures $10,000	September 3	Buenos Aires; Argentina	Clay	(Argentina) Alejandro Fabbri	(Argentina) Lionel Noviski (Argentina) Damián Patriarca
Bulgaria F7 Futures $10,000	September 3	Sofia; Bulgaria	Clay	(Bulgaria) Ivaylo Traykov	(Romania) Ilie-Aurelian Giurgiu (Romania) Octavian Nicodim
Ecuador F3 Futures $10,000	September 3	Quito; Ecuador	Clay	(Ecuador) Giovanni Lapentti	(Brazil) Rodrigo-Antonio Grilli (United States) Justin Diao Natale
Italy F30 Futures $15,000	September 3	Torre del Greco; Italy	Clay	(Argentina) Marcelo Charpentier	(Argentina) Diego Álvarez (Italy) Enrico Burzi
Switzerland F5 Futures $10,000	September 3	Pully; Switzerland	Clay	(France) Alexandre Renard	(Estonia) Mait Künnap (Spain) Jordi Marse-Vidri
Austria F11 Futures $10,000	September 3	St Polten; Austria	Clay	(Austria) Markus Egger	(Slovakia) Jan Stancik (Slovakia) Alexander Somogyi
France F12 Futures $15,000	September 3	Bagnères-de-Bigorre; France	Hard	(France) Romain Jouan	(Australia) Andrew Coelho (Australia) Sam Groth
Germany F15 Futures $15,000	September 3	Kempten; Germany	Clay	(Belarus) Vladimir Voltchkov	(Germany) Dustin Brown (Belgium) Jeroen Masson
Poland F9 Futures $15,000	September 3	Gdynia; Poland	Clay	(Poland) Marcin Gawron	(Poland) Andrzej Grusiecki (Poland) Lukasz Wodnicki
Croatia F9 Futures $10,000	September 3	Zagreb; Croatia	Clay	(Croatia) Vjekoslav Skenderovic	(Serbia) Ivan Bjelica (Serbia) Dusan Mihailovic
Indonesia F4 Futures $10,000	September 10	Manado; Indonesia	Hard	(Australia) Nick Lindahl	(United States) Ikaika Jobe (United States) Brad Lum-Tucker
USA F22 Futures $10,000	September 10	Claremont, California; USA	Hard	(Australia) Carsten Ball	(United States) Nikita Kryvonos (United States) Michael McClune
Bolivia F1 Futures $10,000	September 10	Santa Cruz; Bolivia	Clay	(Argentina) Jonathan Gonzalia	(Argentina) Lionel Noviski (Argentina) Damián Patriarca
Brazil F13 Futures $10,000	September 10	Mogi das Cruzes; Brazil	Clay	(Brazil) Franco Ferreiro	(Brazil) Franco Ferreiro (Brazil) Alexandre Simoni
Japan F8 Futures $15,000	September 10	Osaka; Japan	Hard	(Japan) Yuichi Ito	(Japan) Yaoki Ishii (Japan) Hiroki Kondo
Egypt F8 Futures $10,000	September 10	Heliopolis, Cairo; Egypt	Clay	(Egypt) Mohamed Mamoun	(Egypt) Karim Maamoun (Egypt) Mohamed Mamoun
Russia F7 Futures $15,000	September 10	Balashikha; Russia	Clay	(Russia) Mikhail Elgin	(Russia) Mikhail Elgin (Russia) Vladimir Karusevich
Germany F16 Futures $10,000	September 10	Friedberg; Germany	Clay	(Germany) Marc Meigel	(Hungary) Kornél Bardóczky (Hungary) Sebő Kiss
Switzerland F6 Futures $10,000	September 10	Geneva; Switzerland	Clay	(Serbia) Petar Popović	(Estonia) Mait Künnap (Spain) Jordi Marse-Vidri
France F13 Futures $15,000	September 10	Mulhouse; France	Hard (i)	(New Zealand) Daniel King-Turner	(Switzerland) Alexander Sadecky (South Africa) Izak van der Merwe
Italy F31 Futures $15,000	September 10	Porto Torres; Italy	Hard	(Italy) Massimo Dell'Acqua	(Italy) Riccardo Ghedin (Italy) Enrico Iannuzzi
Spain F34 Futures $15,000	September 10	Móstoles; Spain	Hard	(Spain) Tati Rascón	(France) Jeremy Blandin (France) Ludovic Walter
Sweden F5 Futures $15,000	September 10	Falun; Sweden	Hard (i)	(Sweden) Michael Ryderstedt	(Germany) Ralph Grambow (United Kingdom) Ken Skupski
Germany F17 Futures $10,000	September 17	Nuremberg; Germany	Clay	(Czech Republic) Martin Vacek	(Czech Republic) Dušan Karol (Czech Republic) Jaroslav Pospíšil
France F14 Futures $15,000	September 17	Plaisir; France	Hard (i)	(Monaco) Thomas Oger	(Moldova) Roman Borvanov (France) Clément Reix
Italy F32 Futures $10,000	September 17	Olbia; Italy	Clay	(Italy) Thomas Fabbiano	(Italy) Alessandro Da Col (Italy) Andrea Stoppini
Spain F35 Futures $15,000	September 17	Madrid; Spain	Hard	(Spain) Miguel Ángel López Jaén	(Spain) Miguel Ángel López Jaén (Spain) Sergio Pérez Pérez
Great Britain F17 Futures $15,000	September 17	Nottingham; Great Britain	Hard	(Austria) Martin Fischer	(Austria) Martin Fischer (Austria) Philipp Oswald
Japan F9 Futures $15,000	September 17	Sapporo; Japan	Carpet	(South Korea) Kwon Oh-hee	(Japan) Masato Hatanaka (Japan) Masatoshi Miyazaki
Brazil F14 Futures $10,000	September 17	Sorocaba; Brazil	Clay	(Brazil) Caio Zampieri	(Brazil) Fernando Romboli (Brazil) Nicolas Santos
Bolivia F2 Futures $10,000	September 17	Cochabamba; Bolivia	Clay	(Ecuador) Giovanni Lapentti	(Argentina) Facundo Bagnis (Argentina) Agustin Picco
USA F23 Futures $10,000	September 17	Costa Mesa, California; USA	Hard	(United States) Michael McClune	(United States) Brad Pomeroy (Iceland) Arnar Sigurðsson
Venezuela F3 Futures $10,000	September 17	Valencia; Venezuela	Hard	(Italy) Matteo Volante	(France) Philippe De Bonnevie (Australia) Dane Fernandez
Indonesia F5 Futures $10,000	September 17	Jakarta; Indonesia	Hard	(China) Xu Junchao	(Indonesia) Andrian Raturandang (Indonesia) Christopher Rungkat
Indonesia F6 Futures $10,000	September 24	Denpasar, Bali; Indonesia	Hard	(Japan) Kento Takeuchi	(South Africa) Raven Klaasen (United States) Minh Le
Mexico F6 Futures $15,000	September 24	Monterrey; Mexico	Clay	(Germany) Peter Gojowczyk	(Iceland) Arnar Sigurðsson (New Zealand) Adam Thompson
Venezuela F4 Futures $10,000	September 24	Valencia; Venezuela	Hard	(Romania) Raian Luchici	(Venezuela) William Campos (Cuba) Sandor Martínez
USA F24 Futures $10,000	September 24	Irvine, California; USA	Hard	(United States) Nikita Kryvonos	(United States) Stephen Bass (United States) Todd Paul
Bolivia F3 Futures $10,000	September 24	La Paz; Bolivia	Clay	(Argentina) Guillermo Carry	(Dominican Republic) Jhonson García (Australia) Danilo Zivanovic
Brazil F15 Futures $10,000	September 24	Recife; Brazil	Clay (i)	(Brazil) Daniel Dutra da Silva	(Spain) Cesar Ferrer-Victoria (Spain) Adolfo Gomez Pinter
Argentina F16 Futures $10,000	September 24	Buenos Aires; Argentina	Clay	(Argentina) Pablo Galdón	(Argentina) Jonathan Gonzalia (Argentina) Diego López
Bosnia & Herzegovina F5 Futures $15,000	September 24	Mostar; Bosnia and Herzegovina	Clay	(Croatia) Vjekoslav Skenderovic	(Slovenia) Blaž Kavčič (Czech Republic) Jaroslav Pospíšil
Great Britain F18 Futures $15,000	September 24	Nottingham 2 Great Britain	Hard	(United Kingdom) Josh Goodall	(Australia) Rameez Junaid (New Zealand) Daniel King-Turner
France F15 Futures $10,000	September 24	Forbach; France	Carpet (i)	(France) Josselin Ouanna	(Sweden) Daniel Danilović (Germany) Gero Kretschmer
Spain F36 Futures $15,000	September 24	Martos; Spain	Hard	(Canada) Pierre-Ludovic Duclos	(Canada) Pierre-Ludovic Duclos (Czech Republic) Daniel Lustig
Italy F33 Futures $10,000	September 24	Sardegna Davis; Italy	Clay	(Italy) Simone Vagnozzi	(Italy) Matteo Marrai (Italy) Walter Trusendi

=== October ===
Tournament	Date	City	Surface	Singles champions	Doubles champions
Venezuela F5 Futures $10,000	October 1	Caracas; Venezuela	Hard	(Ecuador) Julio César Campozano	(Venezuela) José de Armas (Venezuela) Jimy Szymanski
Mexico F7 Futures $10,000	October 1	Monterrey; Mexico	Hard	(El Salvador) Rafael Arévalo	(Mexico) Adrian Contreras (Mexico) Luis-Manuel Flores
USA F25 Futures $10,000	October 1	Laguna Niguel, California; USA	Hard	(United States) Lester Cook	(United States) Levar Harper-Griffith (United States) Justin Diao Natale
Australia F6 Futures $15,000	October 1	Sawtell, New South Wales; Australia	Clay	(United Kingdom) Brydan Klein	(Australia) Miles Armstrong (Australia) Strahinja Bobusic
Argentina F17 Futures $10,000	October 1	Buenos Aires; Argentina	Clay	(Argentina) Juan-Martín Aranguren	(Argentina) Demian Gschwend (Argentina) Nicolas Jara-Lozano
France F16 Futures $15,000	October 1	Nevers; France	Hard (i)	(Switzerland) Stéphane Bohli	(France) Jérôme Inzerillo (France) Josselin Ouanna
Italy F34 Futures $10,000	October 1	Sassari; Italy	Clay	(Italy) Simone Vagnozzi	(Italy) Fabio Colangelo (Italy) Marco Crugnola
Germany F18 Futures $10,000	October 1	HamBach; Germany	Carpet (i)	(Germany) Holger Fischer	(Estonia) Mait Künnap (Germany) Philipp Piyamongkol
Portugal F4 Futures $15,000	October 1	Porto; Portugal	Clay	(Portugal) Leonardo Tavares	(Switzerland) Yann Marti (Argentina) Cristian Villagrán
Bosnia & Herzegovina F6 Futures $15,000	October 1	Medugorje; Bosnia and Herzegovina	Clay	(Slovenia) Marko Tkalec	(Serbia) David Savić (Slovenia) Tomislav Ternar
Spain F37 Futures $15,000	October 1	Córdoba; Spain	Hard	(Turkey) Marsel İlhan	(Netherlands) Antal van der Duim (Netherlands) Boy Westerhof
Brazil F16 Futures $10,000	October 1	Porto Alegre; Brazil	Clay	(Spain) Cesar Ferrer Victoria	(Brazil) Eric Gomes (Brazil) Tiago Lopes
Brazil F17 Futures $10,000	October 8	São Leopoldo; Brazil	Clay	(Brazil) Franco Ferreiro	(Brazil) Eric Gomes (Brazil) Tiago Lopes
France F17 Futures $15,000	October 8	Saint-Dizier; France	Hard (i)	(France) Josselin Ouanna	(Czech Republic) Pavel Šnobel (Austria) Martin Slanar
Italy F35 Futures $10,000	October 8	Settimo San Pietro; Italy	Clay	(Italy) Leonardo Azzaro	(Italy) Fabio Colangelo (Italy) Marco Crugnola
Great Britain F19 Futures $15,000	October 8	Jersey; Great Britain	Hard (i)	(Denmark) Frederik Nielsen	(Australia) Raphael Durek (Poland) Dawid Olejniczak
Germany F19 Futures $10,000	October 8	Leimen; Germany	Hard (i)	(Slovenia) Grega Žemlja	(Sweden) David Nylen (Sweden) Henrik Norfeldt
Portugal F5 Futures $15,000	October 8	Espinho; Portugal	Clay	(Spain) José Antonio Sánchez de Luna	(Australia) Andrew Coelho (Finland) Timo Nieminen
Argentina F18 Futures $10,000	October 8	Tandil; Argentina	Clay	(Argentina) Diego Junqueira	(Argentina) Lucas Arnold Ker (Argentina) Lionel Noviski
China F6 Futures $15,000	October 8	Beijing; China P.R.	Hard	(Japan) Go Soeda	(Chinese Taipei) Chen Ti (United States) Phillip King
Australia F7 Futures $15,000	October 8	Gloucester, New South Wales; Australia	Clay	(Australia) Miles Armstrong	(Australia) Sam Groth (Australia) Joseph Sirianni
Mexico F8 Futures $10,000	October 8	Los Cabos; Mexico	Hard	(Germany) Peter Gojowczyk	(Spain) Ignacio Coll Riudavets (Spain) Pablo Martin-Adalia
Venezuela F6 Futures $10,000	October 8	Caracas; Venezuela	Hard	(Ecuador) Julio César Campozano	(Dominican Republic) Víctor Estrella Burgos (Venezuela) Román Recarte
Mexico F9 Futures $10,000	October 15	Los Mochis; Mexico	Clay	(Spain) Ignacio Coll Riudavets	(Spain) Ignacio Coll Riudavets (Spain) Pablo Martin-Adalia
Tunisia F4 Futures $10,000	October 15	Sfax; Tunisia	Hard	(Italy) Francesco Piccari	(Italy) Andrea Arnaboldi (Tunisia) Walid Jallali
India F9 Futures $15,000	October 15	Bellary; India	Hard	(Austria) Rainer Eitzinger	(India) Ashutosh Singh (India) Vivek Shokeen
Japan F10 Futures $15,000	October 15	Kashiwa; Japan	Hard	(Japan) Satoshi Iwabuchi	(United Kingdom) Jonathan Kinsella (Japan) Junn Mitsuhashi
Chile F1 Futures $10,000	October 15	Antofagasta; Chile	Clay	(Chile) Jorge Aguilar	(Argentina) Andres Dellatorre (Argentina) Damián Patriarca
China F7 Futures $15,000	October 15	Beijing; China P.R.	Hard	(United States) Phillip King	(China) Yu Xinyuan (China) Zeng Shaoxuan
USA F26 Futures $15,000	October 15	Mansfield, Texas; USA	Hard	(United States) Michael McClune	(United States) Danny Bryan (New Zealand) Michael Venus
France F18 Futures $15,000	October 15	La Roche-sur-Yon; France	Hard (i)	(Czech Republic) Lukáš Rosol	(Australia) Raphael Durek (Czech Republic) Lukáš Rosol
Great Britain F20 Futures $15,000	October 15	Glasgow; Great Britain	Hard (i)	(Czech Republic) Ladislav Chramosta	(United Kingdom) Josh Goodall (United Kingdom) Ken Skupski
Germany F20 Futures $10,000	October 15	Isernhagen; Germany	Hard (i)	(Germany) Andre Wiesler	(Russia) Nikolai Soloviev (Croatia) Ivan Vuković
Brazil F18 Futures $10,000	October 15	Arapongas; Brazil	Clay	(Brazil) Alexandre Bonatto	(Brazil) Alexandre Bonatto (Brazil) Rodrigo Guidolin
Brazil F19 Futures $10,000	October 22	Porto Alegre; Brazil	Clay	(Brazil) Alexandre Bonatto	(Brazil) Alexandre Bonatto (Brazil) Henrique Pinto-Silva
South Africa F1 Futures $10,000	October 22	Cape Town; South Africa	Hard	(Russia) Danila Arsenov	(South Africa) Raven Klaasen (United Kingdom) Edward Seator
France F19 Futures $10,000	October 22	Rodez; France	Hard (i)	(France) Adrian Mannarino	(Uzbekistan) Murad Inoyatov (Serbia) Vladimir Obradović
Nicaragua F1 Futures $15,000	October 22	Managua; Nicaragua	Hard	(Dominican Republic) Víctor Estrella Burgos	(Colombia) Alejandro González (Argentina) Nicolás Todero
Spain F38 Futures $10,000	October 22	Sant Cugat; Spain	Clay	(Spain) Marc Fornell Mestres	(Spain) Marc Fornell Mestres (Spain) Jordi Marse-Vidri
USA F27 Futures $15,000	October 22	Baton Rouge, Louisiana; USA	Hard	(South Africa) Izak van der Merwe	(United States) Dann Battistone (United States) Brian Battistone
Australia F8 Futures $15,000	October 22	Traralgon; Australia	Hard	(Australia) Nick Lindahl	(Australia) Matthew Ebden (United Kingdom) Brydan Klein
Chile F2 Futures $10,000	October 22	Osorno; Chile	Clay	(Argentina) Damián Patriarca	(Argentina) Andres Dellatorre (Argentina) Damián Patriarca
Japan F11 Futures $15,000	October 22	Tokyo; Japan	Hard	(Japan) Tatsuma Ito	(Japan) Tatsuma Ito (South Korea) Daniel Yoo
India F10 Futures $15,000	October 22	Gulbarga; India	Hard	(Croatia) Ivan Cerović	(India) Vijay Kannan (Kazakhstan) Alexey Kedryuk
Pakistan F1 Futures $10,000	October 22	Islamabad; Pakistan	Clay	(Czech Republic) Adam Vejmelka	(Romania) Bogdan Leonte (Czech Republic) Adam Vejmelka
Tunisia F5 Futures $10,000	October 22	Monastir; Tunisia	Hard	(Italy) Francesco Piccari	(France) Jonathan Eysseric (France) Jérôme Inzerillo
Mexico F10 Futures $10,000	October 22	Ciudad Obregón; Mexico	Hard	(Canada) Érik Chvojka	(United States) Joel Kielbowicz (United States) Ross Wilson
Mexico F11 Futures $10,000	October 29	Ciudad Obregón; Mexico	Hard	(Portugal) Gastão Elias	(Germany) Martin Emmrich (Switzerland) David Stojan
Tunisia F6 Futures $10,000	October 29	Jerba; Tunisia	Hard	(France) Jonathan Eysseric	(Belarus) Sergey Betov (Poland) Adam Chadaj
Venezuela F7 Futures $10,000	October 29	Caracas; Venezuela	Hard	(Venezuela) Román Recarte	(Venezuela) José de Armas (Venezuela) Jimy Szymanski
Pakistan F2 Futures $10,000	October 29	Lahore; Pakistan	Grass	(Pakistan) Aqeel Khan	(Sri Lanka) Harshana Godamanna (Belgium) Bart Govaerts
Chile F3 Futures $10,000	October 29	Santiago; Chile	Clay	(Argentina) Jonathan Gonzalia	(Croatia) Marin Bradarić (Montenegro) Goran Tošić
Australia F9 Futures $15,000	October 29	Happy Valley; Australia	Hard	(Australia) Andrew Coelho	(Australia) Rameez Junaid (Australia) Joseph Sirianni
Spain F39 Futures $10,000	October 29	Vilafranca; Spain	Clay	(Spain) Marc Fornell Mestres	(Spain) David Canudas-Fernandez (Spain) Carlos Rexach-Itoiz
El Salvador F2 Futures $15,000	October 29	La Libertad; El Salvador	Clay	(Argentina) Nicolás Todero	(Netherlands) Bart Beks (Colombia) Michael Quintero
Namibia F1 Futures $10,000	October 29	Windhoek; Namibia	Hard	(Italy) Claudio Grassi	(Austria) Richard Ruckelshausen (Austria) Bertram Steinberger
Brazil F20 Futures $10,000	October 29	Itu; Brazil	Clay	(Ukraine) Artem Smirnov	(Brazil) André Miele (Brazil) João Souza

=== November ===
Tournament	Date	City	Surface	Singles champions	Doubles champions
Brazil F21 Futures $10,000	November 5	Sao Bernardo do Campo; Brazil	Clay (i)	(Brazil) Daniel Dutra da Silva	(Ukraine) Dmytro Kamynin (Ukraine) Artem Smirnov
Botswana F1 Futures $10,000	November 5	Gaborone; Botswana	Hard	(Austria) Richard Ruckelshausen	(Italy) Damiano Di Ienno (Italy) Claudio Grassi
Great Britain F21 Futures $15,000	November 5	Redbridge; Great Britain	Hard (i)	(Belarus) Vladimir Voltchkov	(United Kingdom) Josh Goodall (United Kingdom) Ken Skupski
Spain F40 Futures $15,000	November 5	Las Palmas; Spain	Hard	(Czech Republic) Jaroslav Pospíšil	(Czech Republic) Dušan Karol (Czech Republic) Jaroslav Pospíšil
Australia F10 Futures $15,000	November 5	Adelaide; Australia	Hard	(Australia) Andrew Coelho	(Barbados) Haydn Lewis (Australia) David To
Chile F4 Futures $10,000	November 5	Santiago; Chile	Clay	(Croatia) Marin Bradarić	(Chile) Jorge Aguilar (Chile) Felipe Parada
Pakistan F3 Futures $10,000	November 5	Lahore; Pakistan	Grass	(Czech Republic) Adam Vejmelka	(India) Ashutosh Singh (India) Vivek Shokeen
Venezuela F8 Futures $10,000	November 5	Maracay; Venezuela	Hard	(Venezuela) José de Armas	(Venezuela) Piero Luisi (Venezuela) Roberto Maytín
USA F28 Futures $15,000	November 5	Waikoloa; USA	Hard	(United States) Lester Cook	(United States) Lester Cook (United States) Shane La Porte
Mexico F12 Futures $10,000	November 5	Mazatlán; Mexico	Hard	(Mexico) Luis-Manuel Flores	(Canada) Philip Bester (United States) Glenn Weiner
Mexico F13 Futures $10,000	November 12	Querétaro; Mexico	Hard	(Mexico) Miguel Gallardo Valles	(Mexico) Víctor Romero (Mexico) Bruno Rodríguez
USA F29 Futures $15,000	November 12	Honolulu; USA	Hard	(United States) Dennis Lajola	(Australia) Carsten Ball (United States) Rylan Rizza
Venezuela F9 Futures $10,000	November 12	Isla de Margarita; Venezuela	Clay	(Argentina) Alejandro Kon	(Czech Republic) Roman Vögeli (Czech Republic) Michal Konecny
Chile F5 Futures $10,000	November 12	Santiago; Chile	Clay	(Chile) Guillermo Hormazábal	(Colombia) Juan Sebastián Cabal (Spain) Miquel Perez Puigdomenech
China F8 Futures $15,000	November 12	Wuxi; China P.R.	Hard	(Sweden) Ervin Eleskovic	(Netherlands) Antal van der Duim (Netherlands) Boy Westerhof
Spain F41 Futures $15,000	November 12	Gran Canaria; Spain	Clay	(Italy) Manuel Jorquera	(Greece) Alexandros Jakupovic (Spain) Carles Poch Gradin
Great Britain F22 Futures $15,000	November 12	Sunderland; Great Britain	Hard (i)	(France) Adrian Mannarino	(Belarus) Andrei Karatchenia (Belarus) Vladimir Voltchkov
Rwanda F1 Futures $15,000	November 12	Kigali; Rwanda	Clay	(Netherlands) Matwé Middelkoop	(Netherlands) Matwé Middelkoop (Lithuania) Gvidas Sabeckis
Brazil F22 Futures $10,000	November 12	Porto Alegre; Brazil	Clay	(Brazil) Ricardo Hocevar	(Brazil) Lucas Engel (Italy) Mattia Livraghi
Iran F3 Futures $15,000	November 12	Kish Island; Iran	Clay	(Italy) Enrico Burzi	(Kazakhstan) Alexey Kedryuk (Russia) Valery Rudnev
Iran F4 Futures $15,000	November 19	Kish Island; Iran	Clay	(Russia) Pavel Chekhov	(Hungary) György Balázs (Hungary) Attila Balázs
Uganda F1 Futures $15,000	November 19	Kampala; Uganda	Clay	(Netherlands) Matwé Middelkoop	(Netherlands) Matwé Middelkoop (Lithuania) Gvidas Sabeckis
Brazil F23 Futures $10,000	November 19	Campinas; Brazil	Clay	(Brazil) Daniel Dutra da Silva	(Brazil) Eric Gomes (Brazil) Tiago Lopes
Israel F4 Futures $15,000	November 19	Ramat HaSharon; Israel	Hard	(Belgium) Ruben Bemelmans	(Israel) Amir Hadad (North Macedonia) Lazar Magdinčev
Spain F42 Futures $10,000	November 19	Barcelona; Spain	Clay	(France) Jonathan Eysseric	(Argentina) Diego Álvarez (Greece) Alexandros Jakupovic
China F9 Futures $15,000	November 19	Su Zhou; China P.R.	Hard	(China) Bai Yan	(Netherlands) Antal van der Duim (Netherlands) Boy Westerhof
Chile F6 Futures $10,000	November 19	Santiago; Chile	Clay	(Chile) Jorge Aguilar	(Chile) Guillermo Hormazábal (Spain) Miquel Perez Puigdomenech
Dominican Republic F1 Futures $10,000	November 19	Santo Domingo; Dominican Republic	Hard	(Dominican Republic) Víctor Estrella Burgos	(France) Philippe De Bonnevie (Brazil) Rodrigo-Antonio Grilli
Venezuela F10 Futures $10,000	November 19	Barquisimeto; Venezuela	Clay	(Argentina) Antonio Pastorino	(Czech Republic) Roman Vögeli (Czech Republic) Michal Konecny
Uruguay F1 Futures $15,000	November 26	Montevideo; Uruguay	Clay	(Argentina) Alejandro Fabbri	(Uruguay) Marcel Felder (Spain) Miquel Perez Puigdomenech
Dominican Republic F2 Futures $10,000	November 26	Santo Domingo; Dominican Republic	Hard	(Dominican Republic) Víctor Estrella Burgos	(Czech Republic) Daniel Lustig (Romania) Petru-Alexandru Luncanu
Israel F5 Futures $15,000	November 26	Ramat HaSharon; Israel	Hard	(Israel) Harel Levy	(Israel) Amir Hadad (Israel) Harel Levy
Brazil F24 Futures $10,000	November 26	Santos; Brazil	Clay	(Brazil) João Souza	(Brazil) Ricardo Hocevar (Brazil) Alexandre Simoni
Sudan F1 Futures $15,000	November 26	Khartoum; Sudan	Clay	(Netherlands) Matwé Middelkoop	(Slovakia) Martin Hromec (Slovakia) Alexander Somogyi

=== December ===
Tournament	Date	City	Surface	Singles champions	Doubles champions
Sudan F2 Futures $15,000	December 3	Khartoum; Sudan	Clay	(Netherlands) Matwé Middelkoop	(Austria) Richard Ruckelshausen (Austria) Bertram Steinberger
Brazil F25 Futures $10,000	December 3	Fortaleza; Brazil	Hard	(Brazil) João Souza	(Brazil) Andre Pinheiro (Brazil) João Souza
Czech Rep. F5 Futures $15,000	December 3	Frýdlant nad Ostravicí; Czech Republic	Hard (i)	(Russia) Konstantin Kravchuk	(Czech Republic) Lukáš Rosol (Slovakia) Igor Zelenay
Dominican Republic F3 Futures $10,000	December 3	Santo Domingo; Dominican Republic	Hard	(Dominican Republic) Víctor Estrella Burgos	(Hungary) Kornél Bardóczky (Hungary) Ádám Kellner
Uruguay F2 Futures $10,000	December 3	Punta del Este; Uruguay	Clay	(Argentina) Leandro Migani	(Uruguay) Marcel Felder (Spain) Miquel Perez Puigdomenech
Czech Rep. F6 Futures $15,000	December 10	Opava; Czech Republic	Carpet (i)	(Slovakia) Karol Beck	(Croatia) Nikola Martinovic (Croatia) Joško Topić
Nigeria F3 Futures $15,000	December 10	Lagos; Nigeria	Hard	(Netherlands) Boy Westerhof	(United Kingdom) Alexander Slabinsky (India) Navdeep Singh
Nigeria F4 Futures $15,000	December 17	Lagos; Nigeria	Hard	(United Kingdom) Alexander Slabinsky	(Nigeria) Abdul-Mumin Babalola (Nigeria) Jonathan Igbinovia
