= 2014 ITF Men's Circuit =

Men's tennis tour

Details
- Duration: 6 January 2014 – 28 December 2014
- Edition: 17th
- Tournaments: 673
- Categories: $15,000 tournaments (182) $10,000 tournaments (491)

Achievements (singles)
- Most titles: (Chile) Hans Podlipnik (9)

The 2014 ITF Men's Circuit is the 2014 edition of the entry level tour for men's professional tennis, and is the third tier tennis tour below the Association of Tennis Professionals, World Tour and Challenger Tour. It is organised by the International Tennis Federation (ITF) who additionally organizes the ITF Women's Circuit which is an entry-level tour for women's professional tennis. Future tournaments are organized to offer either $10,000 or $15,000 in prize money and tournaments which offering hospitality to players competing in the main draw give additional ranking points which are valid under the ATP ranking system, and are to be organized by a national association or approved by the ITF Men's Circuit Committee.

The tournaments are played on a rectangular flat surface, commonly referred to as a tennis court. The dimensions of a tennis court are defined and regulated by the ITF and the court is 23.78 meters (78.0 feet) long, 10.97 meters (36.0 feet) wide. Its width is 8.23 meters (27.0 feet) for singles matches and 10.97 meters (36.0 feet) for doubles matches. Tennis is played on a variety of surfaces and each surface has its own characteristics which affect the playing style of the game. There are four main types of courts depending on the materials used for the court surface, clay, hard, grass and carpet courts with the ITF classifying five different pace settings ranging from slow to fast.

== Participating host nations ==
- Algeria (ALG)
- Argentina (ARG)
- Australia (AUS)
- Austria (AUT)
- Bahrain (BHR)
- Belgium (BEL)
- Bosnia and Herzegovina (BIH)
- Brazil (BRA)
- Bulgaria (BUL)
- Canada (CAN)
- Chile (CHI)
- China (CHN)
- Colombia (COL)
- Croatia (CRO)
- Czech Republic (CZE)
- Dominican Republic (DOM)
- Egypt (EGY)
- El Salvador (ESA)
- France (FRA)
- Germany (GER)
- Great Britain (GBR)
- Greece (GRE)
- Guam (GUM)
- Guatemala (GUA)
- Hungary (HUN)
- India (IND)
- Iran (IRI)
- Israel (ISR)
- Italy (ITA)
- Japan (JPN)
- Kazakhstan (KAZ)
- Malaysia (MAS)
- Mexico (MEX)
- Morocco (MAR)
- Netherlands (NED)
- Peru (PER)
- Philippines (PHI)
- Poland (POL)
- Portugal (POR)
- Qatar (QAT)
- Romania (ROU)
- Russia (RUS)
- Senegal (SEN)
- Serbia (SRB)
- Slovenia (SLO)
- South Africa (RSA)
- South Korea (KOR)
- Spain (ESP)
- Sweden (SWE)
- Switzerland (SUI)
- Thailand (THA)
- Togo (TOG)
- Tunisia (TUN)
- Turkey (TUR)
- Ukraine (UKR)
- United States (USA)
- Uzbekistan (UZB)

Countries that are hosting a tournament in 2014, but did not in 2013.

- Algeria (ALG)
- Dominican Republic (DOM)
- Iran (IRI)
- Malaysia (MAS)
- Philippines (PHI)
- South Africa (RSA)
- Togo (TOG)
- Tunisia (TUN)

== Schedule ==
=== Key ===
$15,000 tournaments
$10,000 tournaments

=== January–March ===
No.	January				February				March				
No.	6	13	20	27	3	10	17	24	3	10	17	24	31
1	GER F1	EGY F1	GER F3	GER F4	ARG F2	CRO F1	AUS F1	AUS F2	AUS F3	CAN F2	CHN F3	PHI F1	ALG F1
2	USA F1	FRA F1	EGY F2	ARG F1	EGY F4	ARG F3	CRO F2	FRA F4	CAN F1	CHN F2	SUI F1	SUI F2	AUS F4
3		GER F2	FRA F2	EGY F3	GBR F4	EGY F5	RUS F1	ITA F3	CHN F1	FRA F6	USA F9	ARG F6	MAS F1
4		GBR F1	GBR F2	FRA F3	POR F1	GUA F1	EGY F6	RUS F2	EGY F8	USA F8	ARG F5	BHR F1	USA F10
5		ISR F1	ISR F2	GBR F3	ESP F1	ITA F1	ESA F1	EGY F7	FRA F5	ARG F4	CHI F1	CHI F2	CHI F3
6		USA F2	USA F3	ISR F3	TUR F2	POR F2	GBR F5	GBR F6	GBR F7	CRO F3	CRO F4	CRO F5	CRO F6
7				TUR F1		ESP F2	ITA F2	IND F1	IND F2	EGY F9	EGY F10	EGY F11	EGY F12
8				USA F4		THA F1	POR F3	IRI F1	IRI F2	GBR F8	FRA F7	GRE F3	GRE F4
9						TUR F3	ESP F3	KAZ F1	ITA F4	GRE F1	GRE F2	IND F5	ITA F8
10						USA F5	THA F2	ESP F4	KAZ F2	IND F3	IND F4	ITA F7	JPN F4
11							TUR F4	THA F3	ESP F5	IRI F3	ITA F6	JPN F3	KAZ F4
12							USA F6	TUR F5	TUR F6	ITA F5	JPN F2	PER F2	PER F3
13								USA F7	UKR F1	JPN F1	PER F1	TUR F9	QAT F1
14										KAZ F1	TUR F8		TUR F10
15										TUR F7	UKR F3		
16										UKR F2			

=== April–June ===
No.	April				May				June				
No.	7	14	21	28	5	12	19	26	2	9	16	23	30
1	ALG F2	CHN F5	COL F2	FRA F9	MEX F3	MEX F4	MEX F5	KOR F3	CHN F6	BEL F2	FRA F11	CAN F3	CAN F4
2	AUS F5	COL F1	FRA F8	KOR F2	BIH F1	BIH F2	BIH F3	ROU F3	ITA F17	CHN F7	NED F2	FRA F12	FRA F13
3	CHN F4	BRA F2	KOR F1	MEX F2	CRO F8	CRO F9	CRO F10	RUS F3	KOR F4	ITA F18	USA F15	ITA F20	GBR F12
4	USA F11	EGY F14	UZB F2	UZB F3	EGY F17	CZE F1	CZE F2	BIH F4	RUS F4	NED F1	ARG F7	JPN F8	ITA F21
5	CRO F7	GRE F6	BRA F3	BRA F4	GBR F11	EGY F18	ITA F15	CRO F11	BEL F1	POL F2	BEL F3	NED F3	NED F4
6	EGY F13	IRI F5	EGY F15	EGY F16	ISR F5	ISR F6	MAR F1	CZE F3	CRO F12	BUL F1	BUL F2	ESP F15	ARG F9
7	GRE F5	ITA F10	GBR F9	GBR F10	ITA F13	ITA F14	POR F5	EGY F19	EGY F20	CRO F13	HUN F3	USA F17	AUT F2
8	ITA F9	KAZ F6	GRE F7	IRI F7	ESP F8	POR F4	ROU F2	GUM F1	HUN F1	EGY F21	ISR F9	ARG F8	BEL F5
9	KAZ F5	QAT F3	IRI F6	ISR F4	SWE F2	ROU F1	SLO F1	ITA F16	ISR F7	FRA F10	ITA F19	AUT F1	BUL F4
10	QAT F2	TUR F12	ITA F11	ITA F12	TUR F15	ESP F9	ESP F10	MAR F2	JPN F5	HUN F2	JPN F7	BEL F4	GER F6
11	TUR F11	UZB F1	MEX F1	ESP F7	USA F13	SWE F3	THA F4	POR F6	MAR F3	ISR F8	KAZ F7	BUL F3	KAZ F9
12			ESP F6	SWE F1		TUN F1	TUN F2	SLO F2	POL F1	JPN F6	KOR F6	KAZ F8	KOR F8
13			TUR F13	TUR F14		TUR F16	TUR F17	RSA F1	SLO F3	SRB F1	MEX F6	KOR F7	MEX F8
14				USA F12		UKR F4	UKR F5	ESP F11	RSA F2	RSA F3	POL F3	MEX F7	ROU F6
15						USA F14		THA F5	ESP F12	ESP F13	ROU F4	POL F4	ESP F16
16								TUN F3	THA F6	UKR F7	SRB F2	ROU F5	THA F8
17								TUR F18	TUR F19		ESP F14	SRB F3	TUR F23
18								UKR F6			TUR F21	THA F7	USA F19
19											UKR F8	TUR F22	
20											USA F16	UKR F9	
21												USA F18	

=== July–September ===
No.	July				August				September				
No.	7	14	21	28	4	11	18	25	1	8	15	22	29
1	CAN F5	CAN F6	CHN F9	DEN F2	ITA F26	BLR F1	BLR F2	TPE F2	CAN F9	BEL F15	CAN F11	ESP F28	AUS F6
2	FRA F14	CHN F8	DEN F1	KAZ F10	KAZ F11	BRA F7	BRA F8	COL F4	ECU F5	CAN F10	COL F6	SWE F5	FRA F21
3	GER F7	FRA F15	IRL F1	ROU F10	ARG F13	CAN F7	CAN F8	ECU F4	FRA F17	COL F5	FRA F19	BOL F2	SWE F6
4	GBR F13	GBR F14	ITA F24	ARG F12	AUT F6	ITA F27	TPE F1	GAB F2	GBR F15	ECU F6	SWE F4	CRO F19	BOL F3
5	ITA F22	ITA F23	VEN F3	BEL F9	BEL F10	ROU F11	COL F3	ITA F29	RUS F9	FRA F18	ARG F18	FRA F20	CHI F4
6	AUT F3	VEN F2	ARG F11	GEO F1	ECU F1	AUT F7	GAB F1	NED F6	ESP F25	GBR F16	BOL F1	ITA F33	CRO F20
7	BEL F6	ARG F10	AUT F5	GER F10	FIN F1	BEL F11	ITA F28	POL F6	TUN F4	RUS F10	CRO F18	POR F7	GER F14
8	BUL F5	AUT F4	BEL F8	ITA F25	GEO F2	ECU F2	NED F5	ROU F13	ARG F16	TUN F5	ITA F32	SRB F14	ITA F34
9	HKG F1	BEL F7	EST F2	LTU F1	GER F11	FIN F2	POL F5	ESP F24	AUT F10	ARG F17	SRB F13	TUR F33	KAZ F12
10	ROU F7	BUL F6	FRA F16	RUS F5	LAT F1	GEO F3	RUS F8	ARG F15	BEL F14	CRO F17	ESP F27	USA F26	POR F8
11	SRB F4	EST F1	GER F9	SRB F7	RUS F6	GER F12	ARG F14	AUT F9	CRO F16	ITA F31	TUR F32		ESP F29
12	ESP F17	GER F8	HKG F3	SVK F3	SRB F8	KOR F10	AUT F8	BEL F13	IRI F10	PER F6	USA F25		TUR F34
13	THA F9	HKG F2	ROU F9	ESP F20	SVK F4	RUS F7	BEL F12	CRO F15	ITA F30	SRB F12			
14	TUR F24	ROU F8	SRB F6	USA F22	ESP F21	SRB F9	CRO F14	IRI F9	MEX F11	ESP F26			
15	VEN F1	SRB F5	SVK F2		USA F23	ESP F22	ECU F3	KOR F12	PER F5	TUR F31			
16		SVK F1	ESP F19			SUI F3	FIN F3	MEX F10	POL F7	USA F24			
17		ESP F18	USA F21			TUR F27	GER F13	PER F4	TUR F30				
18		TUR F25					IRI F8	SRB F11					
19		USA F20					KOR F11	SUI F5					
20							MEX F9	TUR F29					
21							ROU F12						
22							SRB F10						
23							ESP F23						
24							SUI F4						
25							TUR F28						

=== October–December ===
No.	October				November				December			
No.	6	13	20	27	3	10	17	24	1	8	15	22
1	AUS F7	AUS F8	BLR F4	CZE F5	GBR F19	AUS F9	AUS F10	BRA F15	ARG F19	ARG F20	DOM F4	CHI F12
2	FRA F22	BLR F3	CZE F4	GBR F18	NOR F2	BRA F13	COL F8	DOM F1	BRA F16	DOM F3	SEN F2	TUR F46
3	USA F27	USA F28	FRA F24	NOR F1	BRA F12	COL F7	MEX F13	THA F10	DOM F2	MEX F15	TOG F2	
4	CHI F5	ZIM F1	GBR F17	BRA F11	EST F4	MEX F12	CAM F1	CAM F2	MEX F14	SEN F1	CHI F11	
5	EGY F27	BRA F9	ESP F32	EST F3	GRE F11	CYP F1	CHI F7	CHI F8	THA F11	TOG F1	QAT F6	
6	GER F15	CHI F6	USA F29	GRE F10	IND F7	EST F5	CYP F2	CYP F3	CAM F3	CHI F10	TUR F45	
7	ITA F35	EGY F28	ZIM F2	IND F6	ITA F39	GRE F12	EGY F33	EGY F34	CHI F9	EGY F36		
8	KAZ F13	FRA F23	BRA F10	ITA F38	MAR F4	IND F8	KUW F2	IRI F11	EGY F35	IRI F13		
9	PER F7	GER F16	EGY F29	POR F12	TUN F6	KUW F1	MAR F6	KUW F3	IRI F12	QAT F5		
10	POR F9	GRE F8	GER F17	TUR F38	TUR F39	MAR F5	TUN F8	TUN F9	QAT F4	TUN F11		
11	ESP F30	ITA F36	GRE F9		USA F30	TUN F7	TUR F41	TUR F42	TUN F10	TUR F44		
12	TUR F35	KAZ F14	ITA F37			TUR F40	USA F32		TUR F43			
13		PER F8	PER F9			USA F31						
14		POR F10	POR F11									
15		ESP F31	TUR F37									
16		TUR F36										

== Point distribution ==
Tournament Category	W	F	SF	QF	R16	R32
Futures 15,000+H	35	20	10	4	1	0
Futures 15,000	27	15	8	3	1	0
Futures 10,000+H	27	15	8	3	1	0
Futures 10,000	18	10	6	2	1	0

== See also ==
- 2014 ATP World Tour
- 2014 ATP Challenger Tour
- 2014 ITF Women's Circuit
