= 2014 ITF Women's Circuit =

Details
- Duration: 30 December 2013 – 28 December 2014

Achievements (singles)

The 2014 ITF Women's Circuit is the 2014 edition of the second-tier tour for women's professional tennis. It is organised by the International Tennis Federation and is a tier below the WTA Tour. The ITF Women's Circuit includes tournaments with prize money ranging from $10,000 up to $100,000.

== Ranking points distribution ==
| Description | W | F | SF | QF | R16 | R32 | QLFR | Q3 | Q2 | Q1 |
|---|---|---|---|---|---|---|---|---|---|---|
| ITF $100,000+H (S) | 150 | 90 | 55 | 28 | 14 | 1 | 6 | 4 | 1 | – |
| ITF $100,000+H (D) | 150 | 90 | 55 | 28 | 1 | – | – | – | – | – |
| ITF $100,000 (S) | 140 | 85 | 50 | 25 | 13 | 1 | 6 | 4 | 1 | – |
| ITF $100,000 (D) | 140 | 85 | 50 | 25 | 1 | – | – | – | – | – |
| ITF $75,000+H (S) | 130 | 80 | 48 | 24 | 12 | 1 | 5 | 3 | 1 | – |
| ITF $75,000+H (D) | 130 | 80 | 48 | 24 | 1 | – | – | – | – | – |
| ITF $75,000 (S) | 115 | 70 | 42 | 21 | 10 | 1 | 5 | 3 | 1 | – |
| ITF $75,000 (D) | 115 | 70 | 42 | 21 | 1 | – | – | – | – | – |
| ITF $50,000+H (S) | 100 | 60 | 36 | 18 | 9 | 1 | 5 | 3 | 1 | – |
| ITF $50,000+H (D) | 100 | 60 | 36 | 18 | 1 | – | – | – | – | – |
| ITF $50,000 (S) | 80 | 48 | 29 | 15 | 8 | 1 | 5 | 3 | 1 | – |
| ITF $50,000 (D) | 80 | 48 | 29 | 15 | 1 | – | – | – | – | – |
| ITF $25,000+H (S) | 60 | 36 | 22 | 11 | 6 | 1 | 2 | – | – | – |
| ITF $25,000+H (D) | 60 | 36 | 22 | 11 | 1 | – | – | – | – | – |
| ITF $25,000 (S) | 50 | 30 | 18 | 9 | 5 | 1 | 1 | – | – | – |
| ITF $25,000 (D) | 50 | 30 | 18 | 9 | 1 | – | – | – | – | – |
| ITF $15,000 (S) | 25 | 15 | 9 | 5 | 1 | – | – | – | – | – |
| ITF $15,000 (D) | 25 | 15 | 9 | 1 | 0 | – | – | – | – | – |
| ITF $10,000 (S) | 12 | 7 | 4 | 2 | 1 | – | – | – | – | – |
| ITF $10,000 (D) | 12 | 7 | 4 | 1 | 0 | – | – | – | – | – |

"+H" indicates that hospitality is provided.

== Retirements ==
| Player | Born | Highest singles/doubles ranking | ITF titles in singles+doubles | Reason |
|---|---|---|---|---|
| (Australia) Bojana Bobusic | 2 October 1987 | 222/187 | 1+3 | ongoing foot problems |
| (Belarus) Ima Bohush | 2 August 1990 | 515/260 | 0+4 | — |
| (Jamaica) Alanna Broderick | 18 August 1980 | 724/364 | 0+4 | — |
| (Spain) Eva Fernández Brugués | 5 May 1986 | 185/336 | 7+2 | — |
| (Denmark) Malou Ejdesgaard | 13 March 1991 | 717/252 | 0+7 | — |
| (Belgium) Debbrich Feys | 20 December 1984 | 341/178 | 1+6 | — |
| (Australia) Azra Hadzic | 26 November 1994 | 301/512 | 1+0 | — |
| (Australia) Sacha Jones | 8 November 1990 | 150/169 | 10+2 | career change |
| (France) Anaïs Laurendon | 15 April 1985 | 180/246 | 6+10 | — |
| (Ukraine) Olga Lazarchuk | 3 December 198 | 146/326 | 4+1 | — |
| (Croatia) Ani Mijačika | 15 June 1987 | 193/222 | 9+10 | — |
| (Hungary) Kira Nagy | 29 December 1977 | 122/96 | 18+10 | — |
| (France) Virginie Pichet | 28 January 1983 | 120/239 | 7+5 | — |
| (Portugal) Frederica Piedade | 5 June 1982 | 142/158 | 11+19 | — |
| (Switzerland) Amra Sadiković | 6 May 1989 | 179/148 | 8+11 | — |

== Comebacks ==
| Player | Born | Highest singles/doubles ranking | ITF titles in singles+doubles |
|---|---|---|---|
| (United Kingdom) Naomi Cavaday | 24 April 1989 | 174/184 | 3+2 |
| (Czech Republic) Gabriela Chmelinová | 2 June 1976 | 258/32 | 6+55 |
| (Serbia) Vojislava Lukić | 31 March 1987 | 203/223 | 6+3 |
| (Czech Republic) Nicole Vaidišová | 23 April 1989 | 7/128 | 2+0 |

== See also ==
- 2014 WTA Tour
- 2014 WTA 125K series
- 2014 ATP World Tour
- 2014 ATP Challenger Tour
- 2014 ITF Men's Circuit
