= Artemon Apostu-Efremov =

Romanian tennis player and coach

- Country (sports): Romania
- Residence: Bucharest, Romania
- Born: 19 June 1979 (age 46) Bucharest, Socialist Republic of Romania
- Turned pro: 1999
- Retired: 2016
- Plays: Right-handed (two-handed backhand)
- Prize money: $55,070

Singles
- Career record: 0–0
- Career titles: 0
- Highest ranking: No. 310 (15 April 2002)

Doubles
- Career record: 0–1
- Career titles: 0
- Highest ranking: No. 466 (17 February 2003)

Coaching career (2011–)
- (Moldova) Radu Albot; (Romania) Irina-Camelia Begu; (Romania) Elena Bogdan; (Romania) Alexandra Cadanțu; (Romania) Adrian Cruciat; (Romania) Ioana Ducu; (Romania) Cristina Ene; (Romania) Adrian Gavrilă; (Romania) Patrick Grigoriu; (Romania) Gabriel Moraru; (Romania) Raluca Olaru; (Romania) Elena-Gabriela Ruse; (Romania) Mihaela Buzărnescu; (Romania) Anca Todoni
- Last updated on: August 16, 2017.

Artemon "Arti" Apostu-Efremov (born 19 June 1979) is a retired Romanian tennis player and currently a tennis coach. Since 2017 he is the coach of fellow Romanian Irina-Camelia Begu. On 15 April 2002, he reached his highest ATP singles ranking of World No. 310 whilst his best doubles ranking was World No. 466 on 17 February 2003. His plays are right-handed.

Apostu-Efremov made his ATP main draw debut at the 2002 Romanian Open in the doubles event partnering Răzvan Sabău.

== Early life ==
In an interview, Apostu-Efremov states that he started playing tennis from about the age of seven, and that he was among the top four or five tennis players in the country by the age of ten. He wanted to play football, but his parents decided that he should start tennis because it was a more "noble sport". Being in Bucharest during its communist period, he played tennis at Dinamo, a large club.

When he was 18, Apostu-Efremov participated in the European Championships, and was second in Romania for the nationals. As a result, he had a chance to get a university scholarship in the USA; however, he decided to keep playing tennis, and he was one of the top 500 in the world by the age of 20.

== Career ==
At about the age of 23, Apostu-Efremov suffered a severe injury on his left leg which prevented him from playing for one-and-a-half years. Later, at the age of 26, he started traveling and helping with younger players, which was the beginning of his partnerships with Adrian Cruciat and Adrian Gavrilă; he stated that this was the start of his coaching career.

In December 2019, Simona Halep announced that she was also going to be coached by Apostu-Efremov in addition to her old coach Darren Cahill for the 2020 season, tweeting, "Welcome to the madhouse, Arti. Happy to have you in the team". This follows a period in which Cahill spent a year off from coaching to spend time at home. Apostu-Efremov has known Halep since she was a teenager, and as of January 2020, he has also spent five years coaching Irina-Camelia Begu. As Halep was separated from Cahill for seven months in 2020, she spent her extended break from competition with Apostu-Efremov; they were not allowed to play tennis until 15 May 2020 because of the COVID-19 pandemic in Romania and only played tennis on clay courts afterward.

Apostu-Efremov has also trained Mihaela Buzărnescu, Raluca Olaru, Elena Bogdan, and Radu Albot.

== Personal life ==
As of April 2020, Apostu-Efremov has a wife and small children.
