= Héctor Ruiz-Cadenas =

Spanish tennis player (born 1983)

Héctor Ruiz
- Full name: Héctor Ruiz Cadenas
- Country (sports): Spain
- Born: 27 April 1983 (age 42)
- Prize money: $66,747

Singles
- Career record: 0–0
- Career titles: 0
- Highest ranking: No. 205 (9 July 2007)

Doubles
- Career record: 0–0
- Career titles: 0
- Highest ranking: No. 394 (9 October 2006)
- Last updated on: 7 March 2018.

Héctor Ruiz Cadenas (born 27 April 1983) is a Spanish tennis player.

Ruiz has a career high ATP singles ranking of 205 achieved on 9 July 2007. He also has a career high doubles ranking of 394 achieved on 9 October 2006.

He won his only ATP Challenger doubles title at the 2006 Iskratel Open in Kranj.

== ATP Challenger and ITF Futures finals ==
=== Singles: 9 (3–6) ===
ATP Challenger (0–2)
ITF Futures (3–4)

Result	W–L	Date	Tournament	Tier	Surface	Opponent	Score
Loss	0–1	Jul 2004	Gandia, Spain	Futures	Clay	(Spain) Jacobo Díaz	4–6, 5–7
Loss	0–2	May 2005	Reus, Spain	Futures	Clay	(Austria) Marco Mirnegg	6–3, 1–6, 0–6
Win	1–2	Jul 2005	Gandia, Spain	Futures	Clay	(Venezuela) Daniel Vallverdú	6–2, 6–2
Loss	0–1	Sep 2006	Seville, Spain	Challenger	Clay	(Spain) Iván Navarro	3–6, 4–6
Win	2–2	Oct 2006	Sant Cugat, Spain	Futures	Clay	(Italy) Mattia Livraghi	6–4, 6–2
Win	3–2	May 2007	Valldoreix, Spain	Futures	Clay	(Spain) Marc Fornell Mestres	4–6, 6–3, 7–5
Loss	0–2	Jun 2007	Sassuolo, Italy	Challenger	Clay	(Ukraine) Alexandr Dolgopolov	1–6, 4–6
Loss	3–3	Jan 2008	Mallorca, Spain	Futures	Clay	(Poland) Adam Chadaj	6–7^{(2–7)}, 1–6
Loss	3–4	Mar 2008	Terrassa, Spain	Futures	Clay	(Spain) Pere Riba	0–6, 0–2 ret

=== Doubles: 8 (2–6) ===
ATP Challenger (1–0)
ITF Futures (1–6)

Result	W–L	Date	Tournament	Tier	Surface	Partner	Opponents	Score
Loss	0–1	Jun 2004	Kranj, Slovenia	Futures	Clay	(Argentina) Carlos Berlocq	(Slovenia) Andrej Kračman (Switzerland) Benjamin-David Rufer	4–6, 4–6
Loss	0–2	Sep 2004	Oviedo, Spain	Futures	Clay	(Spain) David Marrero	(Spain) Antonio Baldellou-Esteva (Spain) Germán Puentes	4–6, 0–6
Loss	0–3	Dec 2005	Pontevedra, Spain	Futures	Clay	(Spain) Gorka Fraile	(Spain) Antonio Baldellou-Esteva (Spain) Jordi Marsé-Vidri	3–6, 2–6
Loss	0–4	Feb 2006	Cartagena, Spain	Futures	Clay	(Spain) Marc Fornell Mestres	(Spain) David Marrero (Spain) Pablo Santos	2–6, 4–6
Loss	0–5	Mar 2006	Catania, Italy	Futures	Clay	(Argentina) Agustin Tarantino	(Brazil) Marcelo Melo (Brazil) Rogério Dutra Silva	3–6, 1–6
Loss	0–6	May 2006	Lleida, Spain	Futures	Clay	(Spain) Carlos Rexach-Itoiz	(Netherlands) Igor Sijsling (Netherlands) Antal van der Duim	2–6, 6–7^{(2–7)}
Win	1–0	Sep 2006	Kranj, Slovenia	Challenger	Clay	(Spain) Antonio Baldellou-Esteva	(Chile) Adrián García (Argentina) Damián Patriarca	0–6, 6–2, [10–7]
Win	1–6	Jul 2008	Elche, Spain	Futures	Clay	(Spain) César Ferrer-Victoria	(Spain) Carlos Calderón-Rodríguez (Spain) Jordi Samper-Montaña	6–2, 6–2
