= Antonio Baldellou-Esteva =

Spanish tennis player and coach

- Country (sports): Spain
- Born: 8 November 1981 (age 43); Barcelona, Spain
- Prize money: $42,531

Singles
- Highest ranking: No. 431 (16 Sep 2002)

Doubles
- Highest ranking: No. 240 (21 Mar 2005)

Antonio Baldellou-Esteva (born 8 November 1981), also known as Tony Baldellou-Esteva, is a Spanish tennis coach and former professional player. Most recently, as of 2020, he is coaching Slovenian player Kaja Juvan.

A Barcelona native, Baldellou-Esteva reached a career high singles ranking of 431 in the world, competing in satellite, Futures and Challenger events. In 2001 he had a win over Rafael Nadal in the qualifying draw of a satellite tournament in Balaguer. His only Challenger title came in doubles at Kranj in 2006.

== Challenger/Futures titles ==
Legend
ITF Futures (2)

=== Singles ===
No.	Date	Tournament	Tier	Surface	Opponent	Score
1.	Oct 2004	Spain F28, Barcelona	Futures	Clay	(Spain) Marc Fornell Mestres	6–2, 7–5
2.	Mar 2007	Spain F11, Sabadell	Futures	Clay	(Spain) Bartolomé Salvá Vidal	6–3, 6–3

=== Doubles ===
Legend
ATP Challenger (1)
ITF Futures (16)

No.	Date	Tournament	Tier	Surface	Partner	Opponents	Score
1.	Sep 2001	Spain F12, Barcelona	Futures	Clay	(Spain) Óscar Hernández	(Andorra) Joan Jimenez-Guerra (Spain) Juan Giner	3–6, 6–3, 7–6^{(6)}
2.	Jun 2004	Slovenia F2, Maribor	Futures	Clay	(Spain) Germán Puentes	(Slovenia) Grega Žemlja (Slovenia) Rok Jarc	6–2, 6–1
3.	Jun 2004	Slovenia F3, Koper	Futures	Clay	(Spain) Germán Puentes	(Czech Republic) Jiri Vencl (Slovakia) Filip Polášek	6–2, 7–5
4.	Jul 2004	Spain F13, Alicante	Futures	Clay	(Spain) Germán Puentes	(Spain) Ferran Ventura-Martell (Spain) Mariano Albert-Ferrando	6–2, 6–7^{(5)}, 6–1
5.	Jul 2004	Spain F16, Dénia	Futures	Clay	(Spain) Germán Puentes	(Spain) Alejandro Vargas-Aboy (Spain) Bernat Mas-Avellaneda	7–6^{(10)}, 6–7^{(4)}, 6–1
6.	Aug 2004	Spain F21, Oviedo	Futures	Clay	(Spain) Germán Puentes	(Spain) Héctor Ruiz-Cadenas (Spain) David Marrero	6–4, 6–0
7.	Sep 2004	Hungary F5, Budapest	Futures	Clay	(Spain) Germán Puentes	(Slovakia) Filip Polášek (Czech Republic) Daniel Lustig	7–5, 3–6, 6–3
8.	Nov 2004	Spain F30, Sant Cugat	Futures	Clay	(Spain) Germán Puentes	(Spain) Carlos Rexach-Itoiz (Spain) Daniel Homedes	7–6^{(5)}, 7–5
9.	Jan 2005	Spain F1, Murcia	Futures	Clay	(Spain) Germán Puentes	(Spain) Alberto Soriano (Spain) Jordi Marse-Vidri	6–4, 6–1
10.	Feb 2005	Spain F2, Murcia	Futures	Clay	(Spain) Germán Puentes	(Russia) Artem Sitak (France) Gerald Bremond	6–3, 7–5
11.	Oct 2005	Spain F29, Barcelona	Futures	Clay	(Spain) Germán Puentes	(Spain) Gabriel Trujillo Soler (Spain) David Marrero	7–6^{(4)}, 6–4
12.	Nov 2005	Spain F34, Pontevedra	Futures	Hard	(Spain) Jordi Marse-Vidri	(Spain) Héctor Ruiz-Cadenas (Spain) Gorka Fraile	6–3, 6–2
13.	May 2006	Spain F17, Maspalomas	Futures	Clay	(Spain) Mariano Albert-Ferrando	(China) Yu Xinyuan (Spain) Javier Ramos	4–6, 6–2, 6–4
1.	Aug 2006	Kranj Challenger, Kranj, Slovenia	Challenger	Clay	(Spain) Héctor Ruiz-Cadenas	(Chile) Adrián García (Argentina) Damián Patriarca	0–6, 6–2, [10–7]
14.	Feb 2007	Spain F8, Terrassa	Futures	Clay	(Spain) Juan Albert Viloca	(Spain) Jordi Marse-Vidri (Spain) Marc Fornell Mestres	7–6^{(6)}, 2–6, 6–3
15.	Mar 2007	Spain F9, Sabadell	Futures	Clay	(Spain) Miguel Ángel López Jaén	(Italy) Mattia Livraghi (Italy) Fabio Colangelo	7–6^{(5)}, 6–0
16.	Mar 2007	Spain F11, Sabadell	Futures	Clay	(Spain) Jordi Marse-Vidri	(Spain) Didac Pérez (Spain) Sergi Durán	6–7, 6–4, 7–6
