= Guillem Burniol =

Spanish tennis player (born 1983)

- Full name: Guillem Burniol-Teixido
- Country (sports): Spain
- Born: 14 August 1983 (age 41); Barcelona, Spain
- Plays: Right-handed
- Prize money: $49,555

Singles
- Career record: 0–2 (ATP Tour)
- Highest ranking: No. 383 (15 Nov 2004)

Doubles
- Career record: 0–1 (ATP Tour)
- Highest ranking: No. 371 (13 Feb 2006)

Guillem Burniol-Teixido (born 14 August 1983) is a Spanish former professional tennis player.

Burniol, a native of Barcelona, had a career high singles ranking of 383 in the world and won four ITF Futures titles during his career. He made two ATP Tour singles main draw appearances at the Valencia Open.

== ITF Futures titles ==
=== Singles: (4) ===
No.	Date	Tournament	Surface	Opponent	Score
1.	Jul 2005	Spain F17, Dénia	Clay	(Spain) Ivan Esquerdo-Andreu	7–5, 2–6, 7–6^{(5)}
2.	Aug 2006	Poland F11, Szczecin	Clay	(Finland) Timo Nieminen	6–3, 6–3
3.	Jan 2007	Spain F3, Palma de Mallorca	Hard	(Spain) Javier Genaro-Martinez	6–4, 1–0, ret.
4.	Jun 2007	Spain F22, La Palma	Hard	(France) Pierrick Ysern	6–4, 6–4

=== Doubles: (3) ===
No.	Date	Tournament	Surface	Partner	Opponents	Score
1.	May 2005	Spain F7, Lleida	Clay	(Spain) Miguel Ángel López Jaén	(Spain) Israel Matos Gil (Spain) José Antonio Sánchez de Luna	6–2, 6–3
2.	Jan 2006	Spain F1, Menorca	Clay	(Spain) José Antonio Sánchez de Luna	(Spain) Carles Poch Gradin (Spain) Pablo Santos	6–4, 6–4
3.	Jan 2007	Spain F1, Menorca	Clay	(Spain) Adrián Menéndez Maceiras	(Spain) Jordi Marse-Vidri (Spain) Juan Albert Viloca	6–3, 7–6^{(4)}
