= Navdeep Singh (tennis) =

Indian tennis player (born 1986)

- Country (sports): India
- Born: 21 February 1986 (age 39); New Delhi, India
- Retired: 2009
- Plays: Right-handed
- Prize money: $26,674

Singles
- Career record: 0–1
- Highest ranking: No. 665 (11 Sep 2006)

Doubles
- Highest ranking: No. 383 (23 Jul 2007)

Navdeep Singh (born 21 February 1986) is an Indian former professional tennis player.

Singh, who was born in New Delhi and raised in Dubai, had a ranking of 63 on the ITF junior circuit, with appearances in junior grand slam tournaments.

On the professional tour, Singh featured in one ATP Tour main draw, as a qualifier at the 2007 Kingfisher Airlines Tennis Open in Mumbai, where he lost in the first round to Toshihide Matsui. He won five ITF Futures doubles titles.

== ITF Futures titles ==
=== Doubles: (5) ===
No.	Date	Tournament	Surface	Partner	Opponents	Score
1.	Feb 2007	Nigeria F1, Benin City	Hard	(India) Divij Sharan	(Chile) Guillermo Hormazábal (Chile) Hans Podlipnik Castillo	6–1, 6–3
2.	Mar 2007	Nigeria F2, Benin City	Hard	(India) Divij Sharan	(Romania) Bogdan-Victor Leonte (Namibia) Jurgens Strydom	6–4, 6–4
3.	Dec 2007	Nigeria F3, Lagos	Hard	(United Kingdom) Alexander Slabinsky	(Israel) Idan Mark (Israel) Amir Weintraub	7–6^{(2)}, 3–6 [10–7]
4.	May 2008	Kuwait F2, Mishref	Hard	(Australia) Leon Frost	(Russia) Alexei Filenkov (Italy) Riccardo Ghedin	6–3, 6–4
5.	Jul 2008	Syria F1, Damascus	Hard	(Austria) Richard Ruckelshausen	(India) Rohan Gajjar (Slovakia) Alexande Somogyi	6–3, 7–5
