= OPT Circuit =

- BE PART OF IT...

Details
- Tournaments: 12
- Categories: ITF Pro Circuit event

Achievements (singles)
- Most titles: (France) Alexis Musialek (3)
- Most finals: (Croatia) Toni Androić (6)
- Points leader: (France) Alexis Musialek (92)

Awards
- Player of the year: (France) Alexis Musialek

OPT Circuit is a series of ITF Pro Circuit event being played across the MENA region.

== About ==
Opt Circuit is a concept created by OPT Sport, that organizes a series of tennis events under the sanction of the International Tennis Federation, across the MENA region.

All OPT Circuit tournaments are open to all tennis players based on merit and without discrimination subject only to the conditions laid down in the ITF Pro Circuit Rule Book.

== Futures ==
In the late 1990s, the ITF introduced Futures tournaments, allowing for greater flexibility in the organization of the tournaments for national associations, and participation in tournaments for players. Over time, the ratio of Futures tournaments to satellites increased until 2007, when satellites were eliminated.

Futures tournaments allow for players to win career titles and improve their rankings. Futures are held in both singles and doubles, and last only one week. As of 2008, the prize fund for each tournament is either US$10,000 or US$15,000. Some tournaments also provide housing for participants. Futures usually have sizable qualifying draws, which allow unranked players to enter tournaments and earn ATP ranking points.

== Tournaments ==
=== 2015 ===
No.	Tournament	Date	Host city	Prize money	Singles champion	Doubles champion
1.	IRI F1	Week of Jan 12	Kish Island (Iran)	US$10,000	TBA	TBA
2.	IRI F2	Week of Jan 19	Kish Island (Iran)	US$10,000	TBA	TBA
3.	IRI F3	Week of Jan 26	Kish Island (Iran)	US$10,000	TBA	TBA
4.	IRI F4	Week of Feb 16	Kish Island (Iran)	US$15,000	TBA	TBA
5.	IRI F5	Week of Feb 23	Kish Island (Iran)	US$15,000	TBA	TBA

=== 2014 ===
No.	Tournament	Date	Host city	Prize money	Singles champion	Doubles champion
1.	IRI F1	Week of Feb 24	Kish Island (Iran)	US$10,000	(Romania) Victor Crivoi	(Brazil) Thales Turini – (Brazil) Caio Silva
2.	IRI F2	Week of Mar 3	Kish Island (Iran)	US$10,000	(Serbia) Peđa Krstin	(Netherlands) Stephan Fransen – (Netherlands) Wesley Koolhof
3.	IRI F3	Week of Mar 10	Kish Island (Iran)	US$10,000	(Romania) Victor Crivoi	(Croatia) Toni Androić – (Croatia) Ivan Blazevic
4.	IRI F4	Week of Apr 7	Kish Island (Iran)	US$10,000	Moved to Apr 28	
5.	IRI F5	Week of Mar 14	Kish Island (Iran)	US$10,000	(Croatia) Toni Androić	(France) Jérôme Inzerillo – (France) Martin Vaïsse
6.	IRI F6	Week of Apr 21	Kish Island (Iran)	US$10,000	(Croatia) Toni Androić	(India) Ronak Manuja – (India) Akash Wagh
7.	IRI F7	Week of Apr 28	Kish Island (Iran)	US$10,000	(Serbia) Marko Tepavac	(Serbia) Marko Tepavac – (Netherlands) Mark Vervoort
8.	IRI F8	Week of Aug 18	Tehran (Iran)	US$10,000	(France) Jules Marie	(France) Jules Marie – (France) Alexis Musialek
9.	IRI F9	Week of Aug 25	Tehran (Iran)	US$10,000	(France) Alexis Musialek	(India) Vinayak Sharma Kaza – (India) Vijay Sundar Prashanth
10.	IRI F10	Week of Sep 1	Tehran (Iran)	US$10,000	(France) Alexis Musialek	(Switzerland) Luca Margaroli – (Italy) Matteo Marfia
11.	IRI F11	Week of Nov 24	Kish Island (Iran)	US$10,000	(Spain) Marc Fornell	(Spain) Marc Fornell – (Spain) Marco Neubau
12.	IRI F12	Week of Dec 1	Kish Island (Iran)	US$10,000	(France) Mathias Bourgue	(Spain) Marc Fornell – (Spain) Marco Neubau
13.	IRI F13	Week of Sep 1	Kish Island (Iran)	US$10,000	(France) Alexis Musialek	(Germany) Jonas Luetjen – (Spain) Timon Riechelt

== Accumulated Circuit Points ==
This is a unique feature of OPT Circuit, which allows players to earn cash rewards at the end of the season, for the achievements on OPT Circuit tournaments.

All ATP ranking points achieved by a player in various OPT Circuit tournaments is added to the players profile, and at the end of the year, the player's with the highest Accumulated Circuit Points are rewarded.

=== Rankings explained ===
1. Players must play on at least 12 Circuit events to qualify for the Accumulated Circuit points system.
2. The best 10 results of each player's single competition is accounted towards their accumulated circuit points.

=== Rewards ===
Rank	Prize money
1.	US$5000
2.	US$3000
3.	US$1500

=== Current ranking ===
Rank	Name	Points
1.	(France) Alexis Musialek	92
2.	(Croatia) Toni Androić	88
3.	(Romania) Victor Crivoi	46
