= Marcel-Ioan Miron =

Romanian tennis player

- Country (sports): Romania
- Born: 6 April 1982 (age 42)
- Plays: Ambidextrous (two-handed forehand)
- Prize money: $36,088

Singles
- Career record: 0–0 (at ATP Tour level, Grand Slam level, and in Davis Cup)
- Career titles: 0 ITF
- Highest ranking: No. 697 (28 August 2006)

Doubles
- Career record: 0–1 (at ATP Tour level, Grand Slam level, and in Davis Cup)
- Career titles: 8 ITF
- Highest ranking: No. 322 (23 June 2008)
- Last updated on: 14 August 2017.

Marcel-Ioan Miron (born 6 April 1982) is a Romanian tennis player.

Miron has a career high ATP singles ranking of 697 achieved on 28 August 2006. He also has a career high ATP doubles ranking of 322 achieved on 23 June 2008.

Miron made his ATP main draw debut at the 2007 BCR Open Romania in the doubles draw partnering Adrian Gavrilă.
