= Adrian Gavrilă =

Romanian tennis player

- Full name: Adrian-Vasile Gavrilă
- Country (sports): Romania
- Born: 1 April 1984 (age 40)
- Plays: Right-handed (two-handed backhand)
- Prize money: $34,642

Singles
- Career record: 0–0 (at ATP Tour level, Grand Slam level, and in Davis Cup)
- Career titles: 0 ITF
- Highest ranking: No. 527 (5 November 2007)

Doubles
- Career record: 0–1 (at ATP Tour level, Grand Slam level, and in Davis Cup)
- Career titles: 17 ITF
- Highest ranking: No. 341 (1 October 2007)
- Last updated on: 14 August 2017.

Adrian-Vasile Gavrilă (born 1 April 1984) is a Romanian tennis player.

Gavrilă has a career high ATP singles ranking of 527 achieved on 5 November 2007. He also has a career high ATP doubles ranking of 341 achieved on 1 October 2007.

Gavrilă made his ATP main draw debut at the 2007 BCR Open Romania in the doubles draw partnering Marcel-Ioan Miron.
