= Marc Fornell Mestres =

Spanish tennis player (born 1982)

- Country (sports): Spain
- Born: 26 January 1982 (age 43); Barcelona, Spain
- Plays: Right-handed
- Prize money: $231,848

Singles
- Career record: 0–1
- Highest ranking: No. 236 (19 November 2007)

Doubles
- Highest ranking: No. 167 (16 July 2007)

Marc Fornell Mestres (born 26 January 1982) is a professional tennis player from Spain. He has captured two ATP Challenger Series/Tour titles. Fornell Mestres's career-high ATP singles entry ranking is World No. 236, achieved on 19 November 2007.

On 31 December 2018, he was provisionally suspended from tennis for leading a match-fixing group. In 2022, Fornell Mestres was convicted of match fixing and received a 2-year suspended prison sentence and a 450€ fine. He was also fined $250,000 and banned from professional tennis for 22 years and 6 months by the International Tennis Integrity Agency.

== Career titles ==
=== Singles (15) ===
Legend (singles)
Grand Slam (0)
ATP World Tour Masters 1000 (0)
ATP World Tour 500 (0)
ATP World Tour 250 (0)
ATP Challenger Tour (0)
ITF Futures (15)

| No. | Date | Tournament | Surface | Opponent in the final | Score |
|---|---|---|---|---|---|
| 1. | 10 June 2001 | Agadir | Clay | (Morocco) Rabie Chaki | 6–3, 6–0 |
| 2. | 16 June 2002 | Canary Islands | Clay | (Spain) Marc Marco Ripoll | 7–5, 2–6, 6–0 |
| 3. | 24 August 2003 | Irún | Clay | (China) Zhu Benqiang | 1–6, 6–2, 6–4 |
| 4. | 5 September 2004 | Oviedo | Clay | (Spain) Carlos Cuadrado | 7–5, 4–6, 6–4 |
| 5. | 7 May 2006 | Vic | Clay | (Spain) Miguel Ángel López Jaén | 6–1, 6–4 |
| 6. | 30 July 2006 | Dénia | Clay | (Spain) Bartolomé Salvá-Vidal | 7–5, 3–6, 6–3 |
| 7. | 20 August 2006 | Irún | Clay | (Argentina) Horacio Zeballos | 7–5, 2–6, 6–3 |
| 8. | 26 November 2006 | Maspalomas | Clay | (Germany) Gero Kretschmer | 6–4, 6–3 |
| 9. | 28 October 2007 | Sant Cugat del Vallès | Clay | (Spain) Javier Genaro-Martínez | 6–3, 4–6, 7–5 |
| 10. | 4 November 2007 | Vilafranca del Penedès | Clay | (Spain) Adrián Menéndez-Maceiras | 6–4, 6–4 |
| 11. | 1 November 2009 | Sant Cugat del Vallès | Clay | (Spain) José Checa Calvo | 2–6, 6–4, 6–2 |
| 12. | 25 July 2010 | Gandia | Clay | (Spain) Juan Lizariturry | 7–6, 3–6, 6–2 |
| 13. | 8 August 2010 | Xàtiva | Clay | (Spain) Juan Lizariturry | 6–3, 6–2 |
| 14. | 15 May 2011 | Kenitra | Clay | (France) Tak Khunn Wang | 6–4, 7–5 |
| 15. | 30 Nov 2014 | Kish | Clay | (Croatia) Toni Androic | 6–1, 6–1 |

=== Doubles (42) ===
Legend (singles)
Grand Slam (0)
ATP World Tour Masters 1000 (0)
ATP World Tour 500 (0)
ATP World Tour 250 (0)
ATP Challenger Tour (2)
ITF Futures (40)

| No. | Date | Tournament | Surface | Partnering | Opponents in the final | Score |
|---|---|---|---|---|---|---|
| 1. | 30 Aug 2000 | Vigo | Clay | (Spain) Didac Pérez | (Portugal) Pedro Pereira & (Portugal) António van Grichen | 4–2, 4–1, 4–2 |
| 2. | 18 Aug 2002 | Vigo | Clay | (Spain) Ferran Ventura-Martell | (Spain) Eduardo Nicolás & (Japan) Norikazu Sugiyama | 6–4, 6–4 |
| 3. | 25 Aug 2002 | Irun | Clay | (Spain) Ferran Ventura-Martell | (Colombia) Alejandro Falla & (Colombia) Carlos Salamanca | 7–6^{(7–3)}, 6–1 |
| 4. | 22 Sep 2002 | Barcelona | Clay | (Spain) Mariano Albert-Ferrando | (Argentina) Carlos Berlocq & (Argentina) Juan Pablo Brzezicki | 7–6^{(7–5)}, 7–5 |
| 5. | 18 Jul 2004 | Elche | Clay | (Spain) Ivan Esquerdo-Andreu | (Spain) Antonio Baldellou-Esteva & (Spain) Germán Puentes | 6–2, 6–1 |
| 6. | 25 Jul 2004 | Gandia | Clay | (Spain) Ivan Esquerdo-Andreu | (Spain) Antonio Baldellou-Esteva & (Spain) Germán Puentes | 6–2, 6–3 |
| 7. | 24 Oct 2004 | Barcelona | Clay | (Spain) Mario Munoz-Bejarano | (Spain) Gorka Fraile & (Spain) David Marrero | 6–4, 4–6, 6–4 |
| 8. | 20 Feb 2005 | Totana | Hard | (Spain) Marcel Granollers | (Poland) Filip Urban & (Germany) Marius Zay | 6–2, 6–3 |
| 9. | 27 Feb 2005 | Cartagena, Spain | Clay | (Spain) Alberto Soriano-Maldonado | (Spain) Mariano Albert-Ferrando & (Spain) Francisco Mendez-Garcia | 6–4, 6–3 |
| 10. | 10 Apr 2005 | Angers | Clay | (Spain) Daniel Monedero-Gonzalez | (France) Nicolas Renavand & (France) Nicolas Tourte | 7–6^{(9–7)}, 1–6, 6–4 |
| 11. | 1 May 2005 | Lleida | Clay | (Spain) Pablo Andújar | (El Salvador) Rafael Arévalo & (Togo) Komlavi Loglo | 6–2, 4–6, 6–3 |
| 12. | 29 May 2005 | Reus | Clay | (Togo) Komlavi Loglo | (Spain) David Marrero & (Spain) Pablo Santos | 5–7, 7–5, 6–1 |
| 13. | 24 Jul 2005 | Gandia | Clay | (Spain) Jordi Marsé-Vidri | (Spain) David Marrero & (Spain) Pablo Santos | 4–6, 6–3, 7–6^{(7–4)} |
| 14. | 21 Aug 2005 | Irun | Clay | (Spain) Daniel Monedero-Gonzalez | (France) Augustin Gensse & (France) Julien Jeanpierre | 6–4, 6–4 |
| 15. | 7 May 2006 | Vic | Clay | (Spain) Jordi Marsé-Vidri | (Spain) Antonio Baldellou-Esteva & (Spain) Germán Puentes | 2–6, 6–3, 7–5 |
| 16. | 16 Jul 2006 | Elche | Clay | (Spain) Miguel Ángel López Jaén | (Morocco) Mounir El Aarej & (Spain) David Luque-Velasco | 6–3, 6–0 |
| 17. | 30 Jul 2006 | Dénia | Clay | (Spain) Miguel Ángel López Jaén | (Spain) Oriol Hernandez-Pastor & (Spain) Javier Ruiz-Gonzalez | 7–6^{(7–5)}, 6–2 |
| 18. | 3 Sep 2006 | Oviedo | Clay | (Spain) Juan-Miguel Such-Perez | (Spain) Miguel Ángel López Jaén & (Spain) David Marrero | 7–6^{(7–2)}, 6–4 |
| 19. | 25 Nov 2006 | Maspalomas | Clay | (Spain) Cesar Ferrer-Victoria | (Germany) Sascha Hesse & (Germany) Mark Joachim | 6–0, 6–4 |
| 20. | 18 Mar 2007 | Badalona | Clay | (Spain) Jordi Marsé-Vidri | (Spain) Miguel Ángel López Jaén & (Spain) Pablo Santos | 6–1, 6–2 |
| 21. | 25 June 2007 | Constanţa | Clay | (Spain) Gabriel Trujillo-Soler | (Romania) Gabriel Moraru & (Romania) Horia Tecău | 6–4, 6–4 |
| 22. | 2 July 2007 | Montauban | Clay | (Spain) Gabriel Trujillo-Soler | (Italy) Adriano Biasella & (Monaco) Jean-René Lisnard | 6–3, 7–5 |
| 23. | 27 Oct 2007 | Sant Cugat | Clay | (Spain) Jordi Marsé-Vidri | (Spain) Miguel Ángel López Jaén & (Spain) David Marrero | 5–7, 6–0, [10–4] |
| 24. | 12 Apr 2008 | Málaga | Clay | (United Kingdom) David Rice | (Spain) Óscar Burrieza & (Russia) Nikolai Nesterov | 1–6, 6–2, [10–7] |
| 25. | 22 Mar 2009 | Castelldefels | Clay | (Spain) Gerard Granollers | (Italy) Stefano Ianni & (Italy) Mattia Livraghi | 6–4, 3–6, [10–5] |
| 26. | 29 May 2009 | Telde | Clay | (Spain) Gerard Granollers | (Spain) Sergio Gutiérrez Ferrol & (Spain) Rafael Mazon-Hernandez | 6–3, 6–4 |
| 27. | 23 May 2010 | Valldoreix | Clay | (Spain) David Cañudas-Fernández | (Spain) Gerard Granollers & (Spain) Juan Lizariturry | 6–3, 7–6^{(7–2)} |
| 28. | 18 Jul 2010 | Elche | Clay | (Spain) Carlos Calderon-Rodriguez | (Spain) Juan Beaus-Barquin & (Spain) Juan José Leal-Gómez | 6–4, 6–2 |
| 29. | 8 Aug 2010 | Xàtiva | Clay | (Spain) Carlos Calderon-Rodriguez | (Portugal) Goncalo Falcao & (Portugal) Martin Trueva | 6–1, 6–3 |
| 30. | 16 Jan 2011 | Majorca | Clay | (Spain) Pablo Santos | (Spain) José Checa Calvo & (Spain) Carles Poch Gradin | 6–1, 6–3 |
| 31. | 2 Apr 2011 | Reus | Clay | (Luxembourg) Mike Vermeer | (Germany) Jan-Lennard Struff & (Germany) Richard Waite | 7–6^{(7–3)}, 6–7^{(1–7)}, [10–8] |
| 32. | 14 May 2011 | Kenitra | Clay | (Luxembourg) Mike Vermeer | (Kuwait) Abdullah Maqdes & (Egypt) Sherif Sabry | 5–7, 7–5, [10–3] |
| 33. | 21 May 2011 | Rabat | Clay | (Luxembourg) Mike Vermeer | (Lebanon) Bassam Beidas & (Egypt) Karim Maamoun | 6–1, 6–4 |
| 34. | 30 Nov 2014 | Kish | Clay | (Spain) Marco Neubau | (North Macedonia) Tomislav Jotovski & (Croatia) Duje Kekez | 6–4, 6–4 |
| 35. | 7 Dec 2014 | Kish | Clay | (Spain) Marco Neubau | (Austria) Markus Sedletzky & (Austria) Dominic Weidinger | 6–3, 6–1 |
| 36. | 14 Mar 2015 | Antalya | Clay | (Spain) Marco Neubau | (Brazil) Rafael Camilo & (Brazil) Eduardo Russi | 6–4, 6–2 |
| 37. | 12 Mar 2016 | Agadir | Clay | (Morocco) Lamine Ouahab | (Spain) Marcos Giraldi Requena & (Switzerland) Jacob Kahoun | 6–7^{(4–7)}, 6–4, [13–11] |
| 38. | 19 Mar 2016 | Beni Mellal | Clay | (Morocco) Lamine Ouahab | (Italy) Filippo Leonardi & (Italy) Fabio Mercuri | 6–3, 7–5 |
| 39. | 30 Jul 2017 | Xàtiva | Clay | (Spain) Sergio Martos Gornés | (Spain) Eduard Esteve Lobato & (Spain) Gerard Granollers | 6–3, 6–2 |
| 40. | 21 Oct 2017 | Pula, Sardinia | Clay | (Portugal) Fred Gil | (Italy) Filippo Baldi & (Italy) Andrea Pellegrino | 6–2, 5–7, [10–5] |
| 41. | 28 Oct 2017 | Pula, Sardinia | Clay | (Portugal) Fred Gil | (Italy) Raúl Brancaccio & (Sweden) Dragoș Nicolae Mădăraș | 3–6, 6–1, [10–8] |
| 42. | 26 Nov 2017 | Hammamet, Tunisia | Clay | (Portugal) Fred Gil | (Spain) Carlos Boluda-Purkiss & (Spain) Oriol Roca Batalla | 6–2, 6–4 |
