= Plainberg =

Hill in Bergheim, Salzburg, Austria

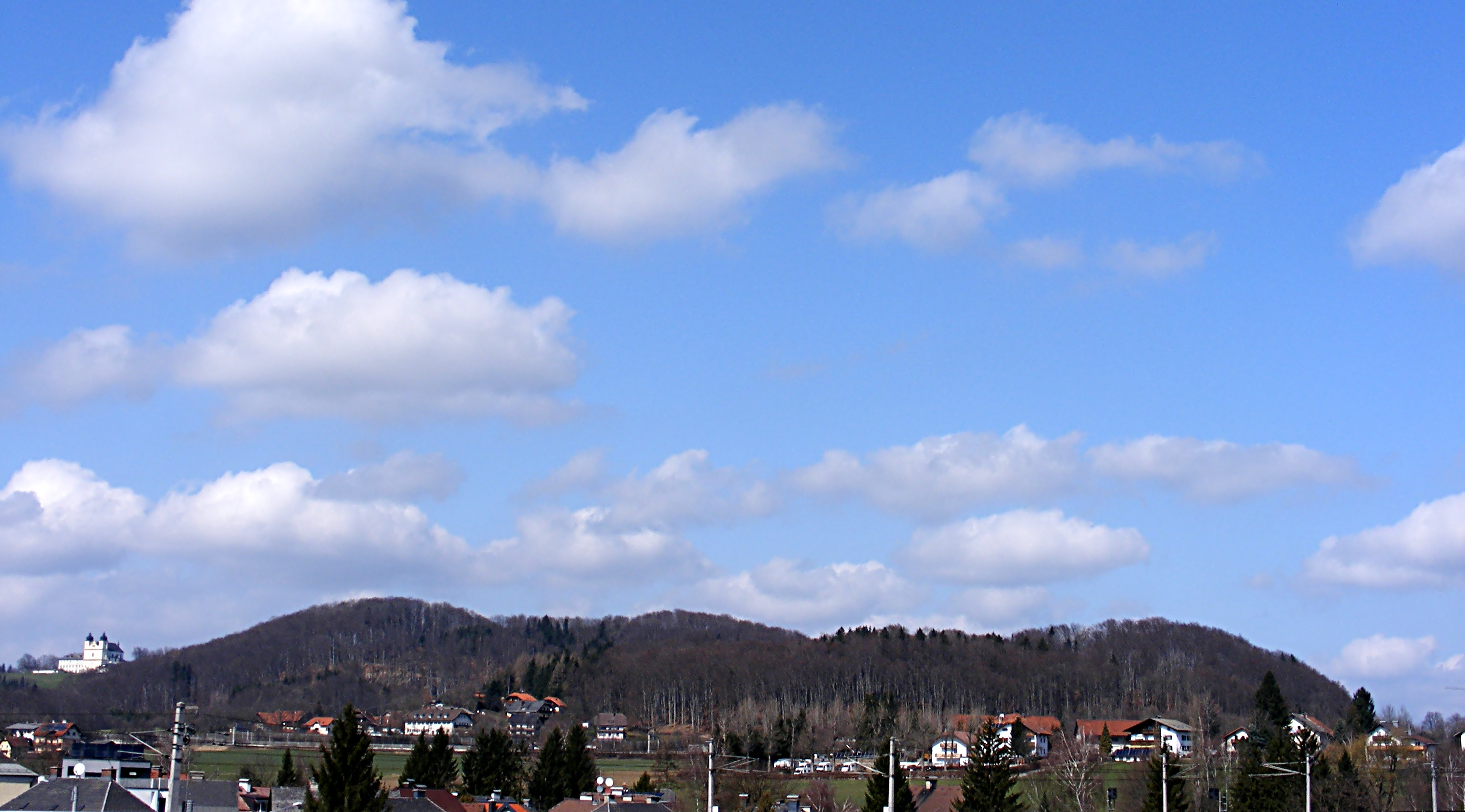
- The Plainberg from the south View from the Salzburg district of Schallmoos

Highest point
- Elevation: 549 m (1,801 ft)
- Prominence: 109 m (358 ft)
- Isolation: 1.67 km (1.04 mi)Hochgitzen
- Coordinates: 47°50′15″N 13°02′39″E

Geography
- Location: Salzburg, Austria
- Parent range: none

Geology
- Rock age: 70–50 mya (Maastrichtian–Ypresian)
- Mountain type: Inselberg
- Rock type: Sandstone

The Plainberg is a 549 m (1,801 ft) hill located primarily in the municipality of Bergheim, north of the city of Salzburg, Austria. It forms part of the Flyschzone, which lies north of the Alps, and is believed to have been inhabited since prehistoric times. The hill holds particular significance as the site of the Maria Plain pilgrimage church, considered the most important pilgrimage destination in the Salzburg region. The Plainberg also serves as a local recreation area and a popular destination for residents of the surrounding area. Nearly the entire hill is designated as a protected landscape area.

== Etymology ==
The name Plain derives from Medieval Latin. The word plaga (meaning slope, field, or plain) evolved into the diminutive form plagina (small slope), which, through the loss of the g and final a, became plain. The name thus refers to the sloping terrain of the hill. The naming likely draws inspiration from the expansive, largely treeless southern slope in the west. The earliest documented references to the name appear as Play in 1285 and Play(e)n around 1415.

The notion that the Plainberg's name originates from the Plainburg castle and the Counts of Plain in Großgmain, southwest of Salzburg, is likely incorrect. The jurisdiction of the Counts of Plain and the subsequent Plain Court ended just before the Plainberg, which, since the Middle Ages, belonged to the Radeck Court (later Neuhaus). Nevertheless, both Plain names share the same Latin root. The name of the municipality Plainfeld, approximately 10 km east of the Plainberg, is unrelated to plagina.

As the meaning of plagina and its derivative plain became less understood, and with the connotation of a slope, the name increasingly became a simple field name. To clarify its status as a hill, the suffix -berg was added, first documented in 1803. The name Plain alone was also used for the hill, as seen in references like “Maria Trost auf dem Plain bey Salzburg” (1753), “erzbischöfliche geistliche Räthe und Superiorn auf dem Plain” (1848), and “entlang der 15 Bildstöcke und zweier Säulen nach Plain” (1990).

The use of Plain alone indicates that the field name was also applied to the Plainberg as a settlement area. Since the 19th century, Plain has been one of the five localities of the municipality of Bergheim, encompassing the settlement areas on the hill. This led to variations like Plainerberg and Plainer Hügel. Names like Plainer Hügel and Plainhügel reflect the hill's relatively low elevation. The meadows on the Plainberg were historically referred to as Plainfelder (“The procession went around the Plainfelder,” 1848).

The Plain region has inspired names for other features, such as Maria Plain, Plainbach, Plainbrücke, and Plainstraße. The latter, a northern arterial road from Salzburg, was documented as Plainer Weg as early as the 18th century. The Plainberg is so closely associated with the Maria Plain pilgrimage church that it is sometimes mistakenly believed to be named after it. Some also believe, via emigrants, that the name Maria Plain influenced the naming of the American village of Plain in Sauk County, Wisconsin, though this is also incorrect.

== Geography ==
=== Topography ===
==== Location and extent ====
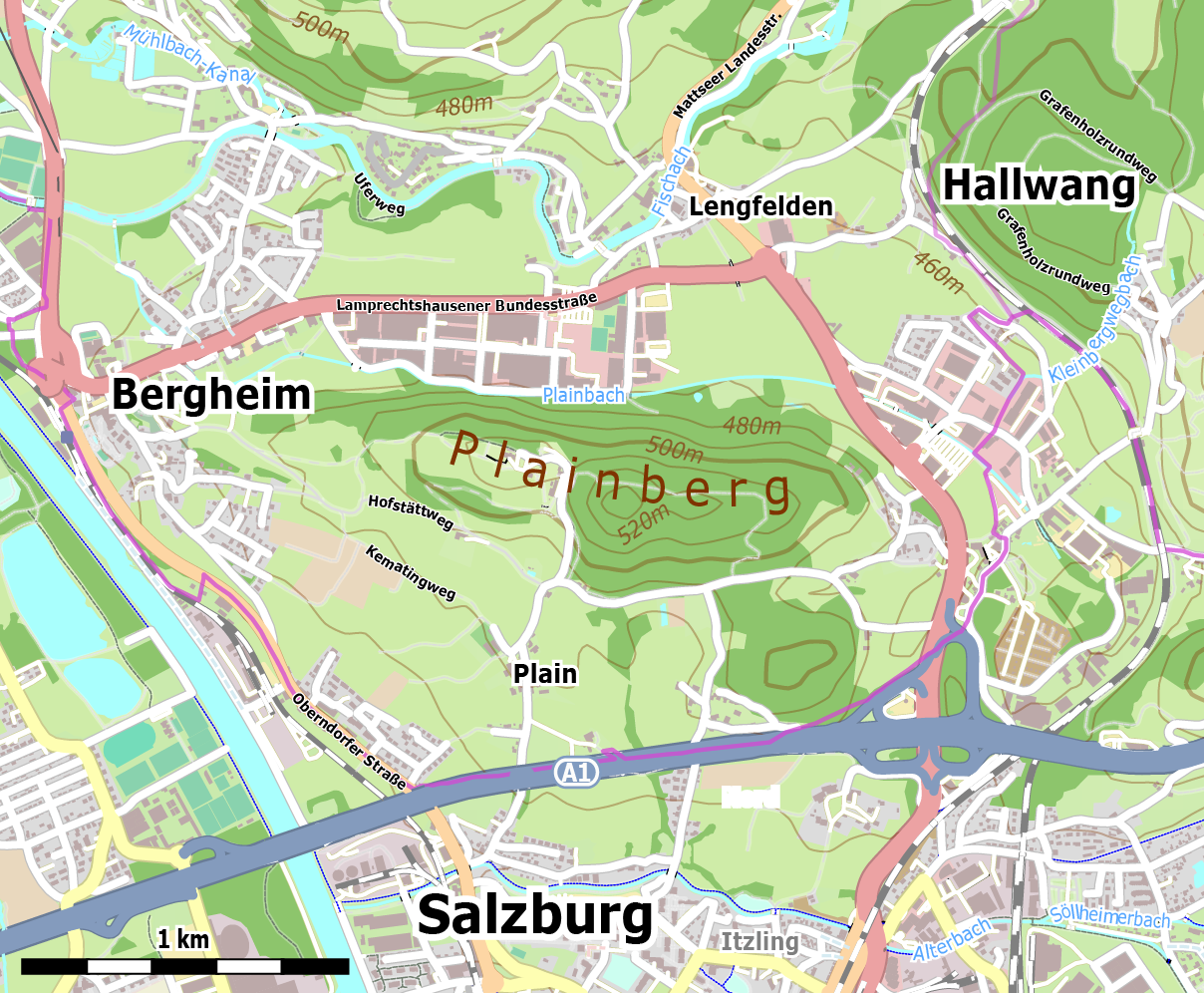
Overview map of the surrounding area

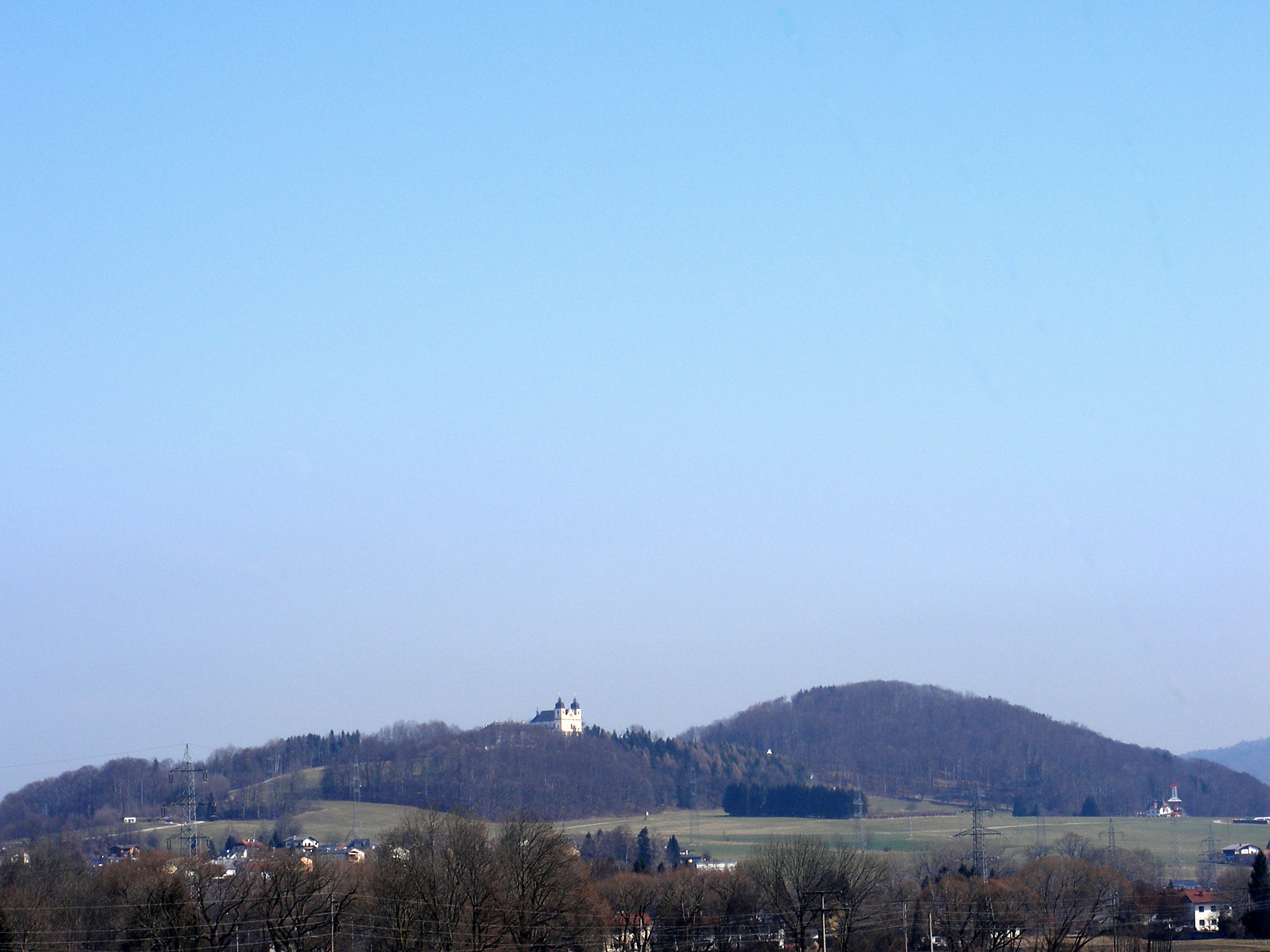
The Plainberg from the west-southwest, viewed from the Salzburg district of Liefering

The Plainberg lies in the transition zone between the Northern Limestone Alps and the Alpine Foreland, forming part of the northern boundary of the Salzburg Basin. It stretches in a west–east direction along the northern city limits of Salzburg to Bergheim, with almost its entire area within the Bergheim municipality. Only the initial southern slopes fall within the city of Salzburg. The hill spans approximately 2.4 km in length and about 1 km in north–south extent, including the Rauchenbichl, a southeastern ridge between the localities of Gaglham and Radeck. Including the lowermost part of the hill in Salzburg's city area north of the Alterbach, the north–south extent reaches slightly over 1.5 km. The northern slope descends steeply along most of its length, while the southern ascent is gentler. The highest point reaches 549 m (1,801 ft). Relative to its surroundings (Salzburg locality at 424 m, Bergheim locality at 435 m), the hill's elevation is modest, at approximately 115–125 meters. The total area of the hill is just over 2 km^{2}.

==== Settlement topography ====
Several settlement areas are located at the base and on the Plainberg itself, all part of the Bergheim municipality and the cadastral community Bergheim I:

- Bergheim: The main village with a rural character at the northwest and western base of the hill.
- Gaglham: A partly rural settlement located roughly centrally on the southern side.
- Hagenau: Primarily a residential area with suburban characteristics at the southwestern base; a small portion west of the Bergheim state road L118 belongs to the city of Salzburg, within the northern half of the Itzling Nord district.
- Kemating (also Plain-Kemating): A centrally located settlement on the hill with a partly dispersed settlement character.
- Maria Plain: A cluster of religious buildings, ancillary structures, and hospitality businesses on the western of the hill's two summits (530 m).
- Radeck: Primarily a residential area on the eastern slope.

Additionally, the western side features the Hofstätt isolated settlement. The Rauchenbichl in the southeast is entirely forested, with no residential structures, and is designated as a retreat for deer and small game, off-limits to the public.

East to northeast of the Plainberg lies the residential and commercial area of Kasern, primarily within the city of Salzburg (Kasern district). A smaller portion, including the Lengfelden settlement separated from Radeck by a federal road, belongs to Bergheim. The Bergheim portion of Kasern, together with Radeck, is termed Radeck-Kasern. However, in terms of Bergheim's localities, the Bergheim part of Kasern (excluding Lengfelden) falls under the Lengfelden locality. The Lengfelden settlement, like other Bergheim settlements on the Plainberg, belongs to the Plain locality, also referred to as Maria Plain. The Bergheim and Hagenau settlements at the western base belong to the Bergheim locality.

The small Salzburg portion of the Plainberg lies in the Itzling district (cadastral community Bergheim II). Salzburg's settlements at the hill's base include the Grabenbauernsiedlung on the western slope toward Kemating, a settlement midway to Gaglham, and one below Rauchenbichl in the east, which also hosts a campsite.

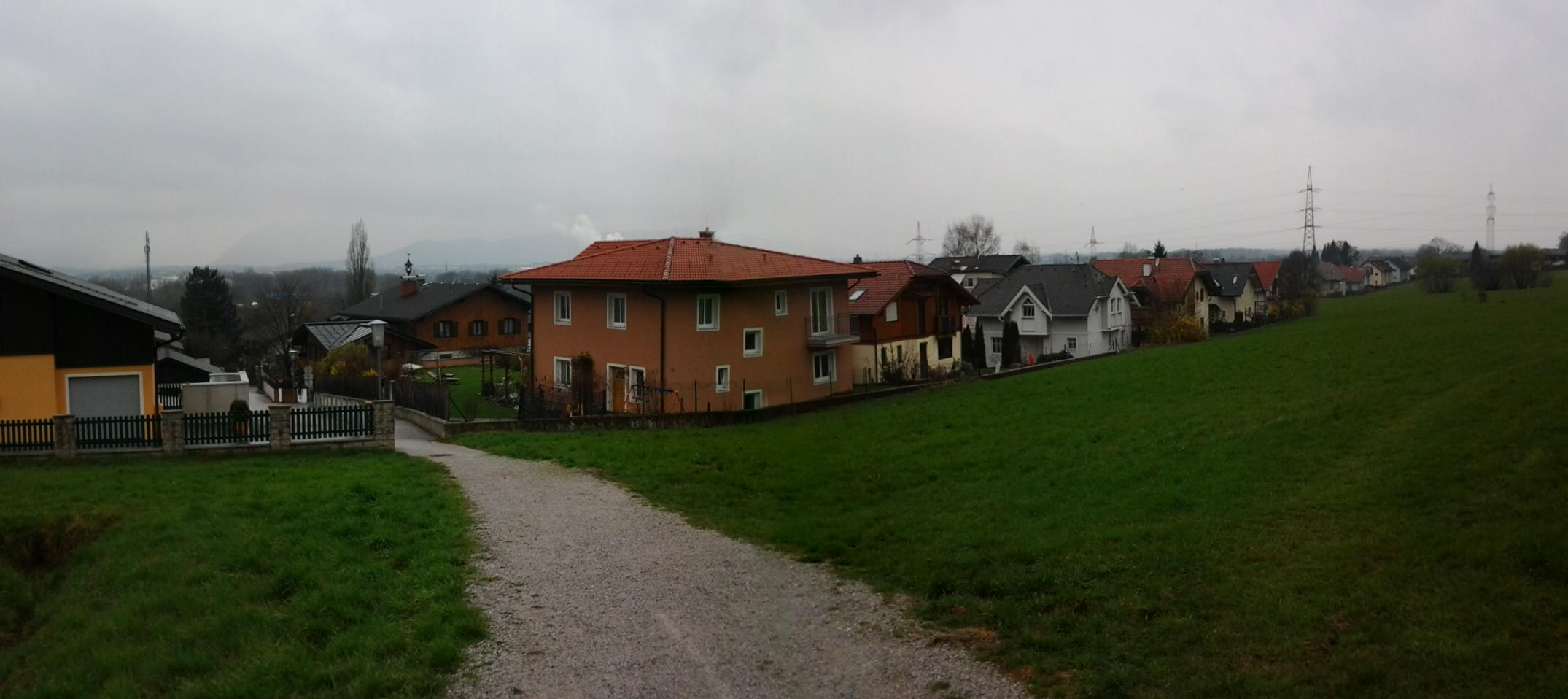
Hagenau

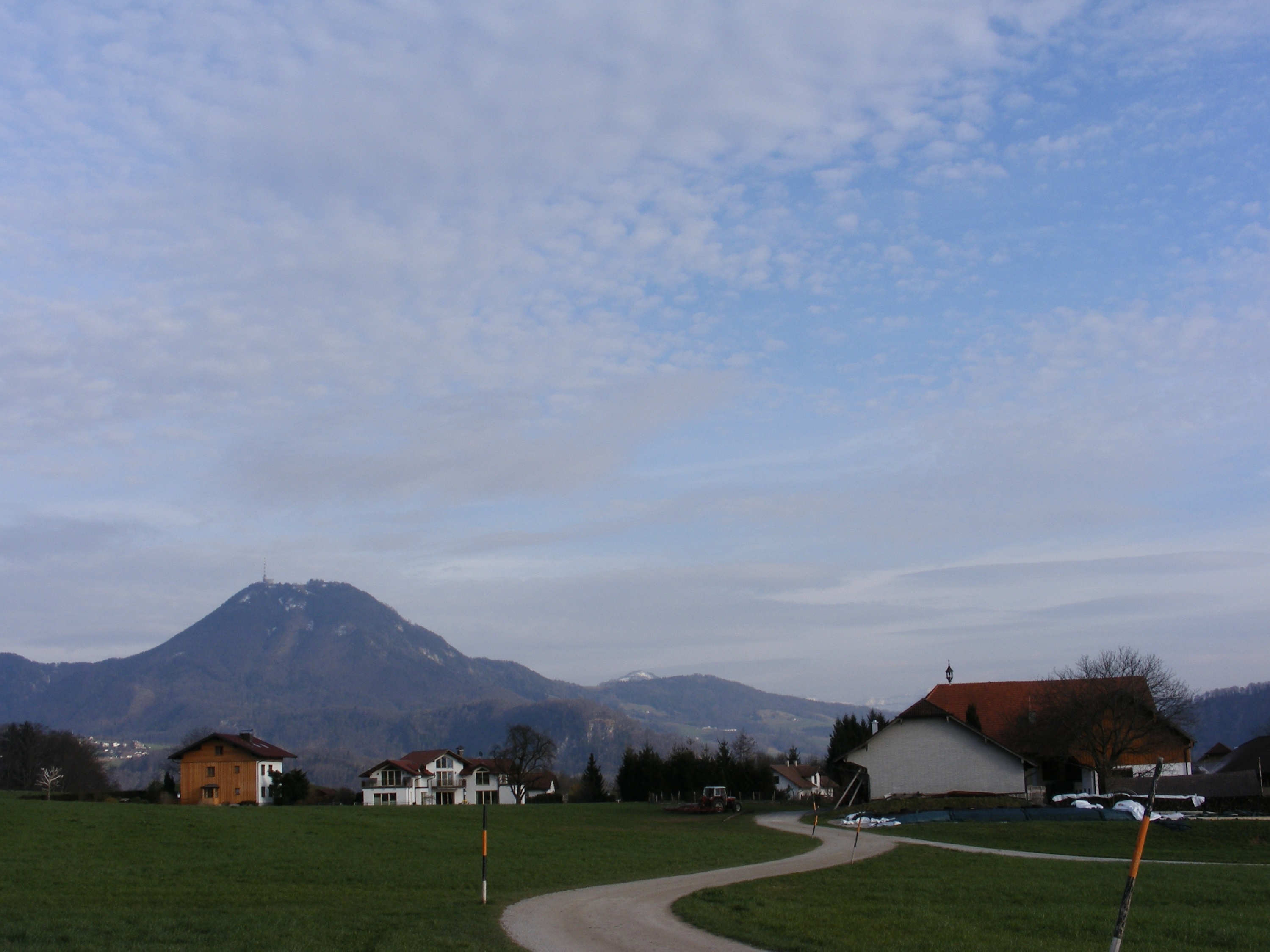
Kemating

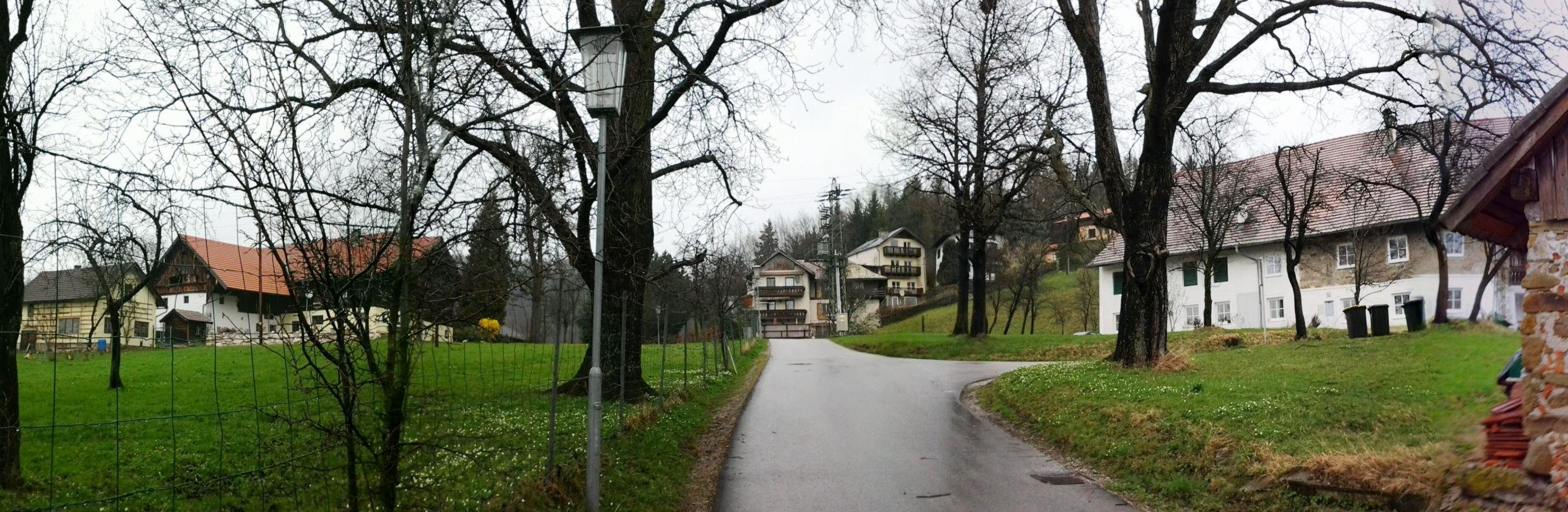
Gaglham

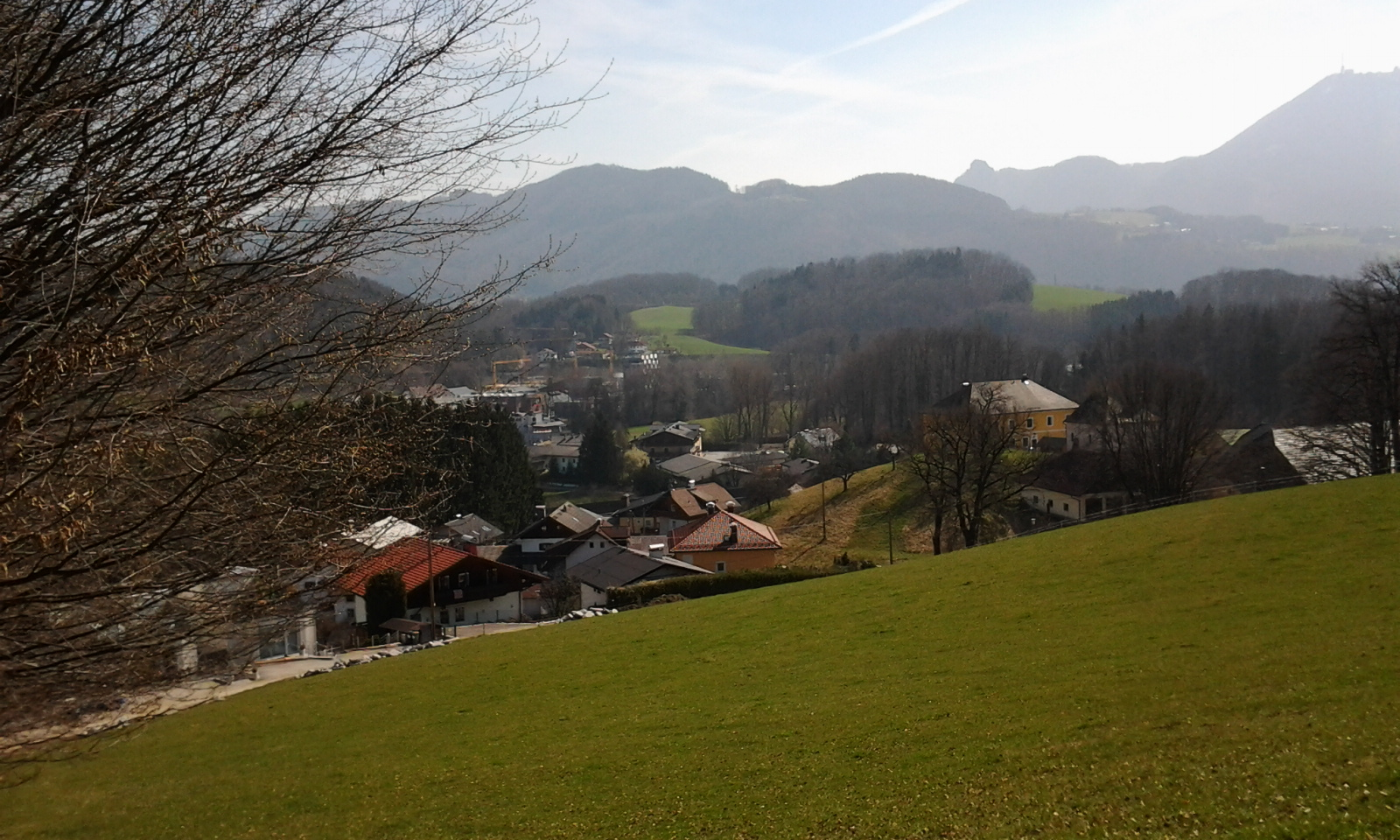
Radeck

==== Water bodies ====
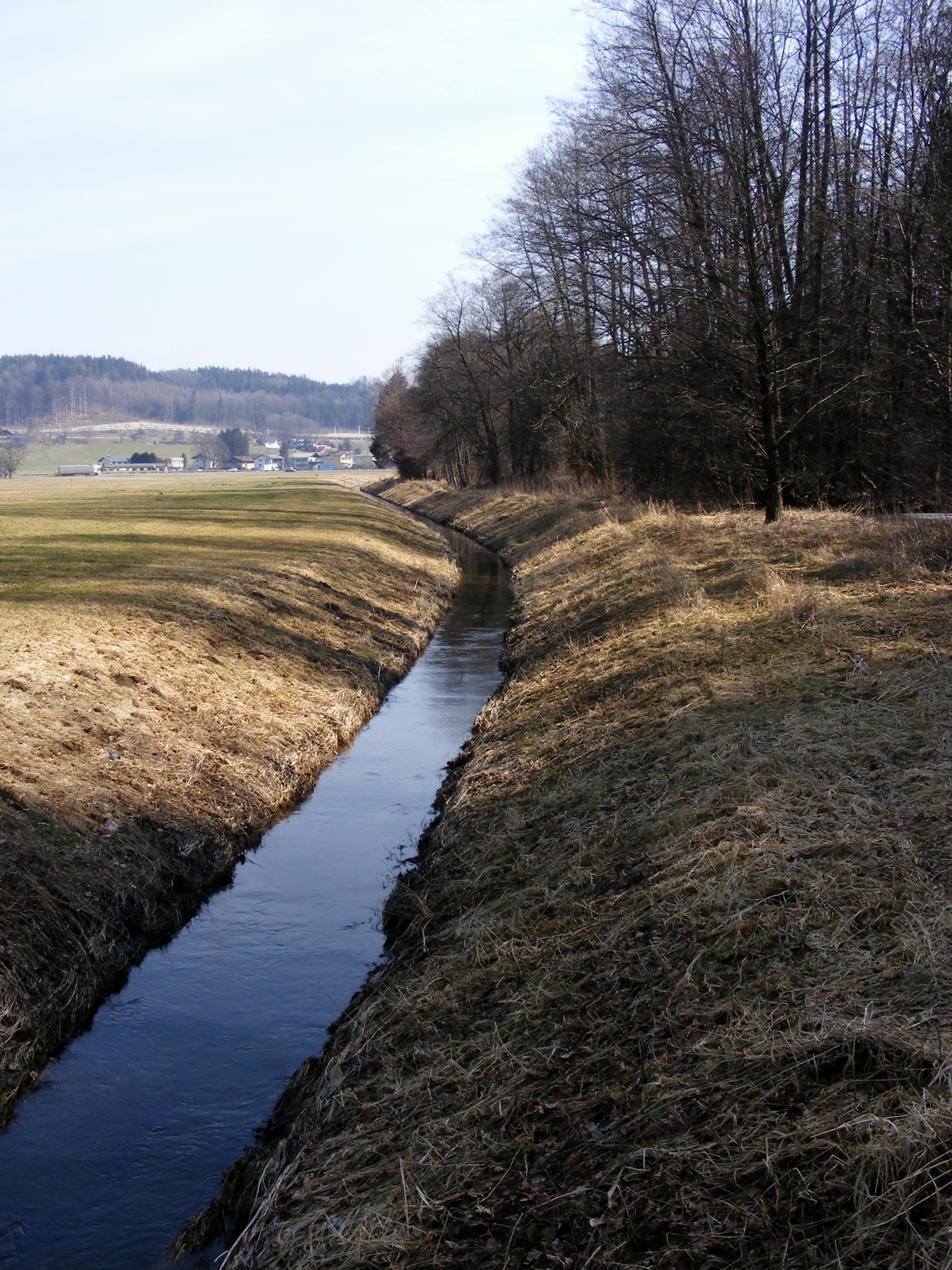
The regulated Plainbach at the northern base of the Plainberg

The Plainbach, a stream approximately 4.3 km long, flows parallel to the northern edge of the hill's base. It originates from multiple sources east of Kasern, flows westward, then turns north at the Bergheim locality, and joins the Fischach stream west of Bergheim's Fischach district, which flows into the Salzach after about 1.4 km. Another small stream originates northeast of the Maria Plain pilgrimage church and flows north but dries up during low-precipitation periods.

The southern boundary of the Plainberg is marked by the lower course of the Alterbach. On the southern slope, south of Kemating and mostly within Salzburg's city limits, a 350 m-long tributary of the Alterbach (officially Alterbach Af) flows southwest. On the western side, a stream officially named Salzach Sa crosses from Hagenau through Salzburg's Itzling Nord district and flows into the Salzach after 330 meters.

Small ponds, each a few hundred square meters, are located 330 m south of the Plain church, 300 m northwest of Gaglham, and at the northern base in the eastern half. Drinking water reservoirs are present in Radeck, Maria Plain, and roughly halfway between the pilgrimage church and Bergheim.

==== Land use ====
Regarding land use, the area is distributed as follows:

- 37.6% deciduous forest,
- 55.1% grassland (partly with tree cover),
- 7.3% built-up area.

Forests are located in the north and east, while the southern and southwestern parts are treeless. From a spatial planning perspective, these forests are not designated as protective forests or primarily for forestry but serve welfare and recreational purposes, contributing to water purification, water balance, climate regulation, and public recreation.

=== Climate ===
No weather station is located on the Plainberg, but several monitoring points exist within Salzburg's city limits at various elevations and on other hills bordering the Salzburg Basin. Exact data for the Plainberg are unavailable but can be inferred from these measurements.

The weather conditions around the Plainberg align with the climate of Salzburg city and the Salzburg Basin. The climate features relatively mild winters and rainy summers, with June to August being the wettest months and December to February the driest. From 1961 to 1990, average January precipitation was about 60 mm, while July saw approximately 200 mm, measured at Salzburg Airport. Precipitation on the slightly more northern Plainberg may be lower, as rainfall decreases northward. A consistent snow cover typically occurs from New Year to mid-February, with extremes in the last century ranging from 14 days in 1913 to 121 days in 1971.

The Salzburg region experiences typical basin-related inversion weather conditions, with lower temperatures in lower layers than in higher elevations year-round. This effect is most pronounced at 200–400 m above ground but is also evident at the Plainberg's elevation in about 30% of annual cases and 42% in January. Temperature differences in this range are typically less than 1 °C and are most significant from October to February. Data collected on Salzburg's Rainberg at 518 m, roughly the Plainberg's elevation, from 1987 to 1998 show the following monthly average temperatures:

Average Temperatures on the Rainberg (1987–1998) in °C
Jan	Feb	Mar	Apr	May	Jun	Jul	Aug	Sep	Oct	Nov	Dec
0.2	1.9	4.8	8.6	13.4	15.6	18.2	18.0	14.2	9.8	3.8	0.8

These values are likely similar for the Plainberg due to its comparable elevation. However, slight deviations of about 0.5 °C lower may occur due to the Rainberg's proximity to urban areas, which yield slightly higher readings.

Prevailing winds in Salzburg flow northwest–southeast near the ground. This pattern likely applies to the Plainberg, as the west–east flow typical of the Alpine Foreland occurs at higher altitudes or further north. Despite its low elevation, the Plainberg acts as a barrier, reducing air exchange in its wind shadow, notably in Salzburg's Schallmoos and Sam areas.

The relative humidity near the ground in Salzburg varies significantly daily and less so seasonally, with greater fluctuations in built-up areas (55–90%) than in rural surroundings. At higher elevations like the Gaisberg (1278 m), humidity is more stable (75–80%). On the Rainberg, monthly averages range from 69% in May to 83% in November. The Plainberg, at Salzburg's outskirts, likely has similar values, slightly higher than the Rainberg's by 1–3%.

== Geology ==
The Plainberg lies in the Rhenodanubian Flysch Zone and features the characteristic rounded ridges and summits typical of such formations. Its rock composition includes flysch, consisting of grey-greenish calcareous quartz to clay-marl-sandstone (mürbsandstein), locally termed the Anthering Formation. For example, at Radeck, there are “marly limestones and sandstones, the latter with shell-like impressions filled with a clay-shale mass.”

These rocks formed during the transition from the Cretaceous to the Paleogene, approximately 70–50 million years ago (Maastrichtian to Ypresian, spanning the Paleocene to the lower Eocene). North of the Plainberg–Nußdorf ridge, a characteristic fault line runs from the Muntigl hill (also a flysch remnant) via Heuberg toward Unterkoppl. At Kasern, a geological window reveals ultrahelvetic colorful marls belonging to the basement rock. This fault line is part of the Innsbruck-Salzburg-Amstetten Fault system (ISAM), where basement rock between the Limestone Alps and Flysch is thrust upward, offset by about 10 km north–south in Salzburg.

During the last Ice Age (Würm glaciation, ca. 100,000–25,000 years ago), the Plainberg was covered by the Salzach glacier. At the Hochgitzen–Haunsberg massif, glacier tongues split northward and northeastward (Wallerseelobus). Toward the end of the Ice Age, the massif likely emerged as a flysch nunatak. The northwestern Salzburg Lake Plateau is covered entirely by glacial moraine. Subsequently, a large glacial lake formed in the Salzburg Basin, with streams flowing southwest from the moraine. As the Salzach deepened, the Fischach (from the Wallersee) exposed the Plainberg–Nußdorf ridge as a cliff before the Hochgitzen. Glacial low terraces at the southern base, shaped by the Schernbach and Alterbach, indicate further incision. Post-glacial moorland lies to the north, with remnants preserved in the Tümpel in Kasern.

In the 19th century, stones quarried in the west near Bergheim were used for construction, and the clayey weathering layer on the opposite side was mined for brick production. The vegetation consists of typical flysch hill deciduous mixed forests and grasslands.

== Nature ==
=== Vegetation ===
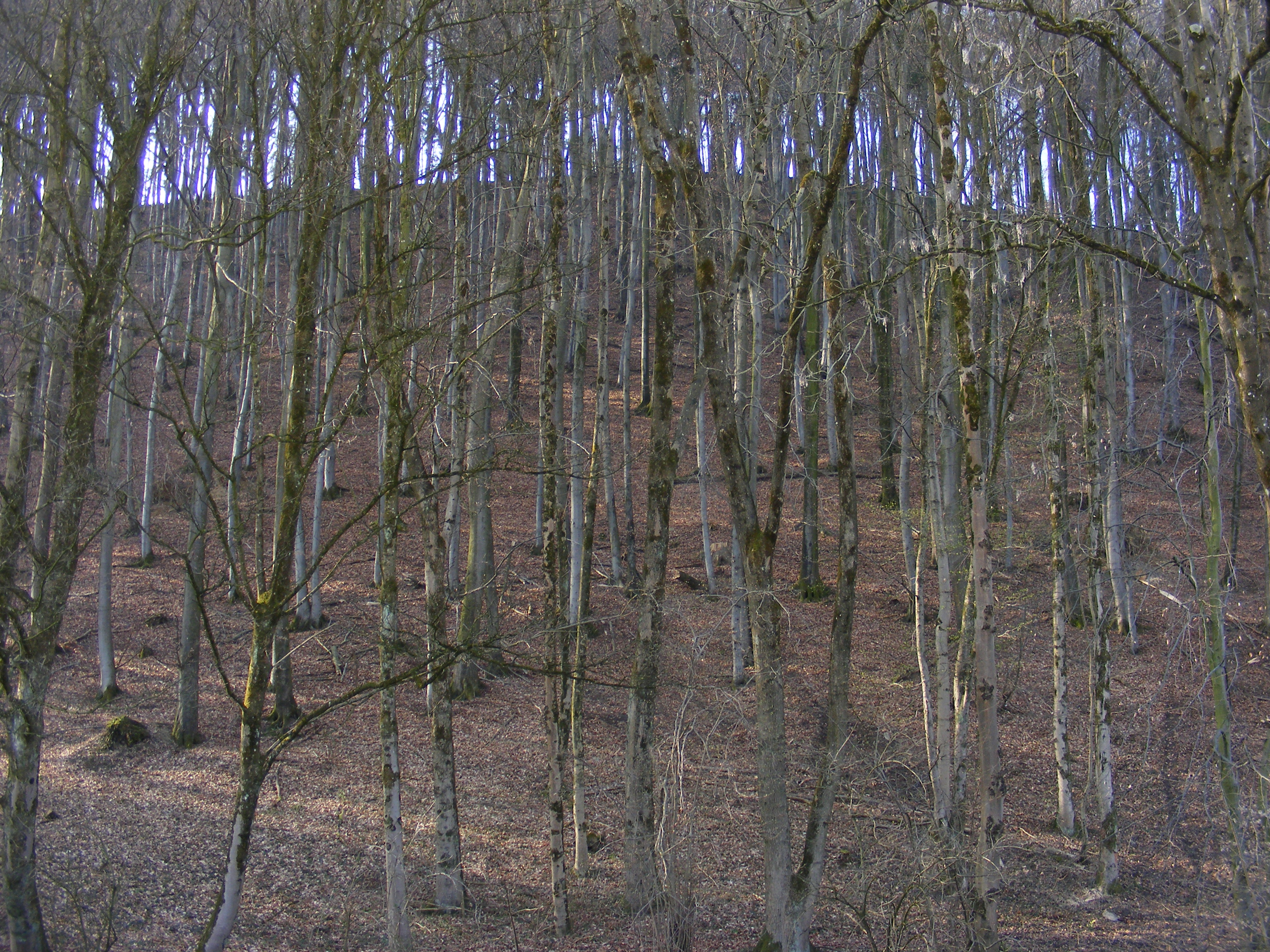
Tree cover on the northwestern slope of the Plainberg

After the last Ice Age, the Plainberg was largely covered by open woodland interspersed with grazing areas, extending to the Salzach floodplain in the northwest. The northern side was dominated by common ash, Norway maple, and European beech. In the Early and High Middle Ages, much of this forest was cleared for agriculture. Remnants of this shade forest remain near the Bergheim cemetery and lower northern slopes. Upper slopes are dominated by beech. The northern slope is a fine example of a ravine forest. Between Kemating and Maria Plain, over 20 tree species thrive, including warmth-loving field maple and blackthorn below the Calvary hill. Near the Bergheim commercial center and above Gaglham, remnants of black alder indicate former moor complexes.

Above Gaglham, the cyclamen, a typical beech forest species, grows, unique to this area on the hill. In the dry, nutrient-poor meadows near the Calvary hill, over 40 herbaceous plant species flourish, including the rare white violet (albino forms of various violet species). Small remnants of wet meadows east of the federal road near Radeck point to a former moor that supplied peat until around 1900 before being converted to meadows, where cotton grass and sedge species persist.

=== Fauna ===
Intensive agriculture dominates the Bergheim area, with few extensively managed meadows remaining, leading to a significant decline in zoological diversity due to unsuitable habitats. A remnant wet meadow near Radeck supports several butterfly species, though mainly those with minimal ecological requirements. Of the 72 butterfly species historically recorded in Bergheim, only 30 were observed from the 1990s onward. Rare birds in the region, such as the grey heron, bluethroat, and yellow wagtail, pass through but do not nest on the Plainberg, historically residing in the Siggerwiesen area.

=== Conservation ===
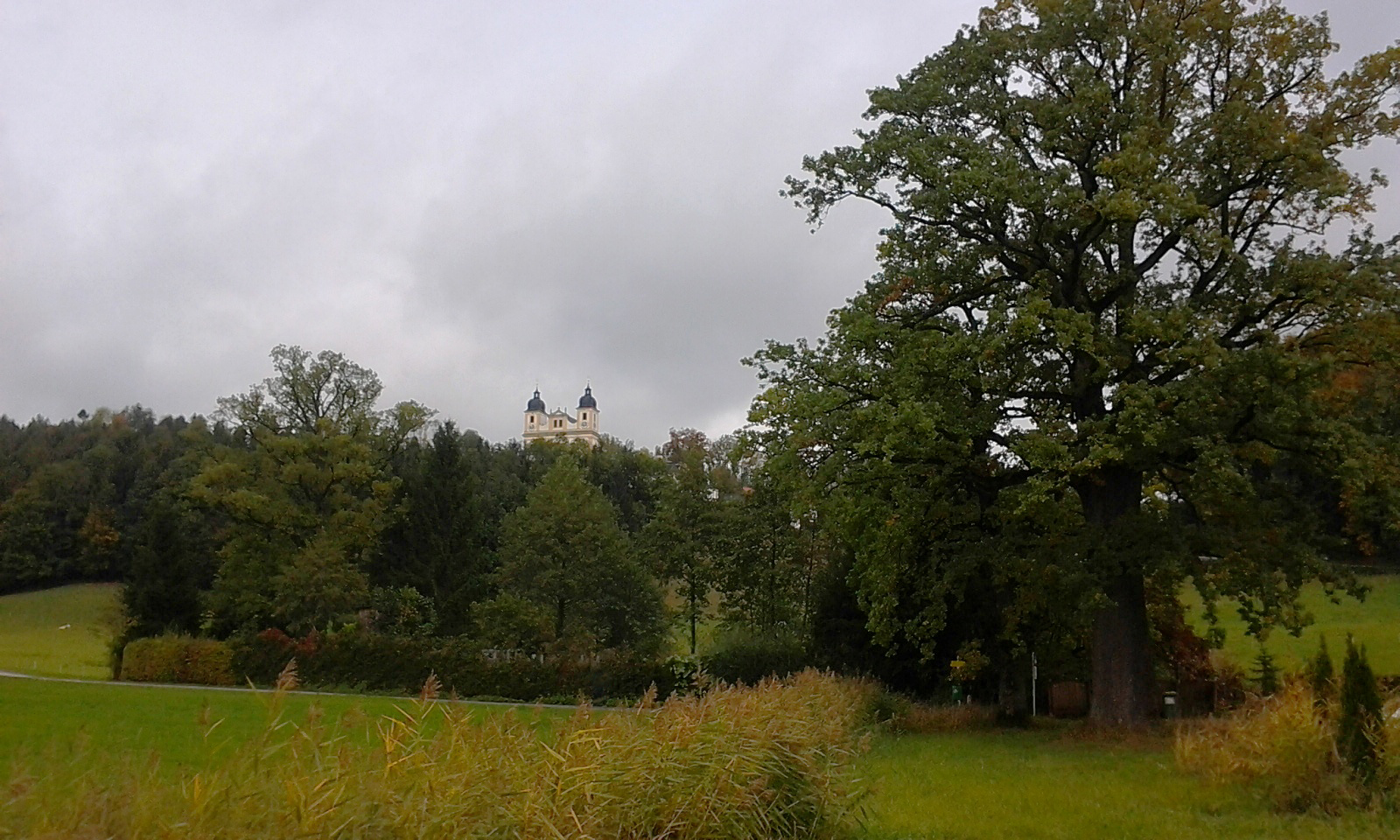
The Tree Group in Maria Plain

In 1976, most of the Plainberg in Bergheim was designated a protected landscape area under the Plainberg Landscape Protection Ordinance, with the Salzburg portion added in 1981 (LSG 49). This covers 201.3 ha in Bergheim and 12.2 ha in Salzburg. A building ban has been in place since at least 1939, except for the westernmost meadows toward Hagenau. The purpose is to preserve the landscape's beauty, including the Baroque ensemble of Maria Plain, and its recreational value.

Additionally, a 0.2 ha area of Oaks on the Gaglhamerweg in Salzburg was designated a protected landscape element in 1987. Since 1992, a 420 m^{2} Oak Grove near Hagenau north of the settlement has also been a protected landscape element.

== History ==
=== Prehistory and antiquity ===
The Bergheim area, including the Plainberg, was likely inhabited since the Neolithic period (ca. 10,000 BCE). Archaeological finds on and near the Plainberg confirm prehistoric settlement. In Kemating, a dark serpentine sledgehammer from the Neolithic (ca. 4000 BCE), possibly used for metalworking, was found in 1893. In 1977, several neck-ring-shaped copper ingots from the early Bronze Age (2000–1800 BCE) were discovered in Kemating's soil from Lengfelden. On the eastern side near Kasern, a settlement from 2200 to 1600 BCE was identified, and near Radeck, a bronze axe with mid-shaft flanges was found in 1850. Northeast of the Plainberg near the Plainbach, a bronze dagger with three rivet holes for a wooden handle, dated to ca. 1500 BCE, was uncovered. In the mid-19th century, a quarry in Bergheim yielded several Bronze Age artifacts, mostly lost, though six bronze cloak pins with disc or spherical heads (14th–13th century BCE) and ceramic fragments and bronze armlets from the younger Urnfield culture (10th–9th century BCE) were preserved. Fewer finds exist from the Iron Age. From the Early Iron Age (Hallstatt culture, 800–450 BCE), a small bronze ear pick was found near Kasern in 1948 during Plainbach regulation. At Gaglham, near the modern motorway, a settlement from this period was confirmed in 1939, with traces of two 5 × 10 m wooden structures oriented south.

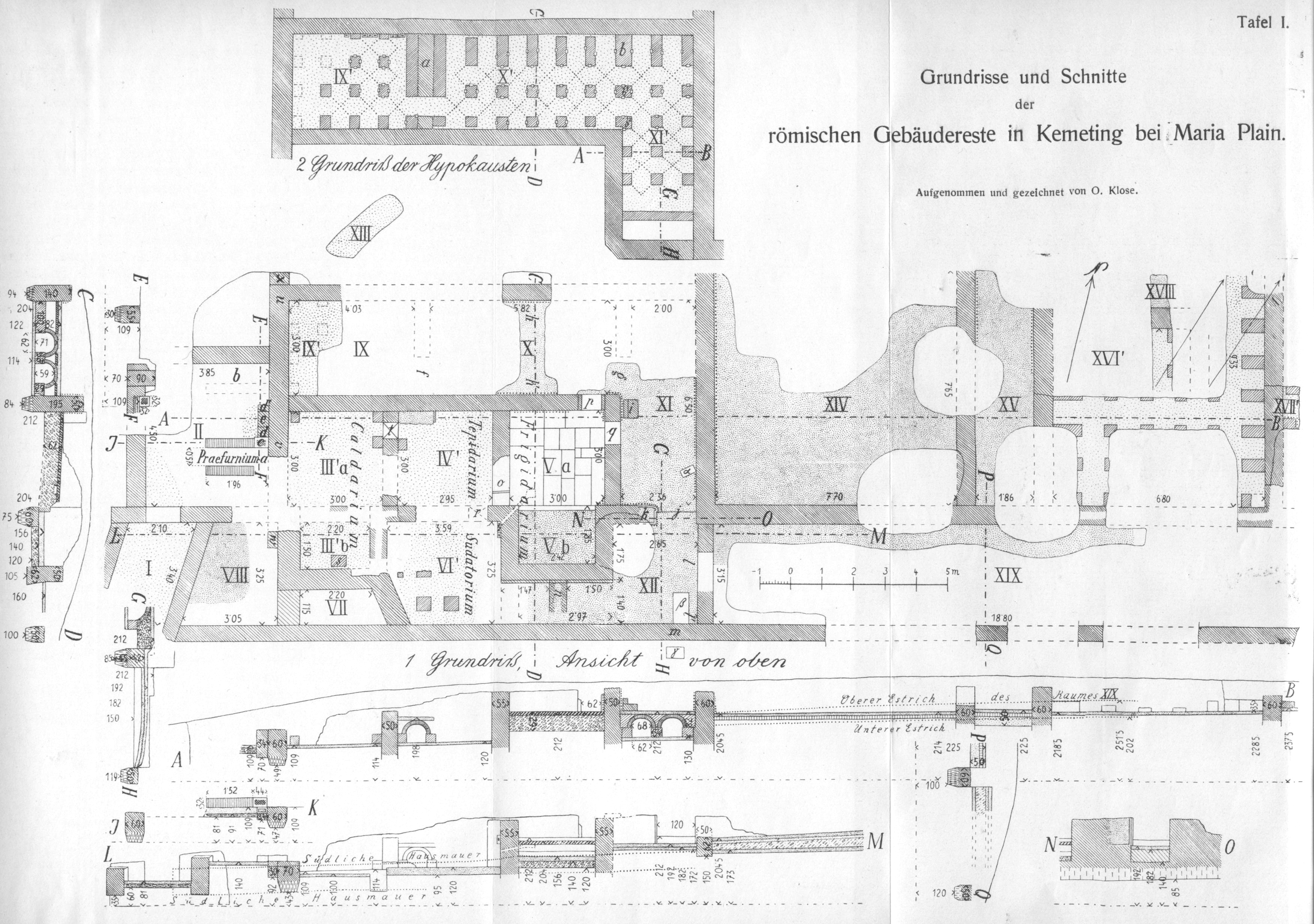
Plan of the excavated foundations of the Roman villa of L. Vedius Optatus

During the Roman province of Noricum, a manor in Kemating, owned by L. Vedius Optatus in the late 3rd century, was excavated. The 32 × 10 m structure, possibly lasting into the 4th century, resembled a villa rustica but was larger, featuring living quarters with floor and wall heating, a bath with cold, warm, and hot water basins, a sweat room, and an open colonnaded hall facing Iuvavum (modern Salzburg). Building materials included local flysch sandstone, travertine (possibly from Plainfeld), and Adnet and Untersberg marble. Discovered in 1907, 40 cm below the surface on two agricultural plots, the site is no longer exposed. Finds, including coins, iron tools, and utensils, are housed in the Salzburg Museum.

=== Middle Ages and Early Modern Period ===
No archaeological evidence of settlement on the Plainberg exists from the collapse of the Roman Empire through the Early Middle Ages, though the region remained sparsely inhabited. The place name Gaglham, likely derived from the Old High German personal name Gagilo and the suffix -ham (from -heim), supports Early Medieval settlement, first documented as Gakilheim in 991. Kemating, first recorded in 991 as Cheminatum, derives from the Old High German cheminata (from Medieval Latin caminata, meaning a heated room), indicating a settlement “near those living in a heated house.” Both Gaglham and Kemating likely began as single farmsteads, later subdivided due to inheritance. The name Radeck, possibly linked to the term roden (to clear), indicates medieval land reclamation through deforestation, first documented as Radekke around 1225 in connection with a castle. Clearings likely began in the 11th century under Salzburg's archbishops. A woman named Alheidis de Radecce is mentioned in 888.

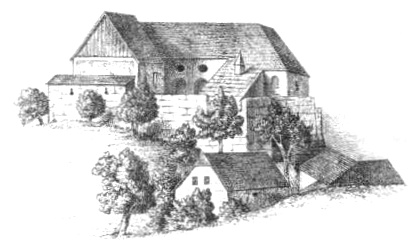
Former Schloss Radeck (drawing from 1879), seat of the Lords of Radeck

In 1568, a woodcut map by Philipp Apian, part of the Bairische Landtafeln, likely first recorded Bergheim, with Radeck as the only marked site on the Plainberg, depicted as a castle. In 1716, a map by Odilo von Guetrather, published by Johann Baptist Homann in Nuremberg, marked Plain as another locality and depicted the path to the pilgrimage basilica.

Significance of the Maria Plain Pilgrimage site

While the Plainberg was primarily agricultural, serving farmers’ obligations to the authorities, its prominence surged in the mid-17th century with the erection of the Maria Plain miraculous image. The area had long held religious significance, as a Kemating farmstead was donated to a poorhouse in the mid-12th century, managed by the church. The site of the miraculous image became an immediate religious focal point.

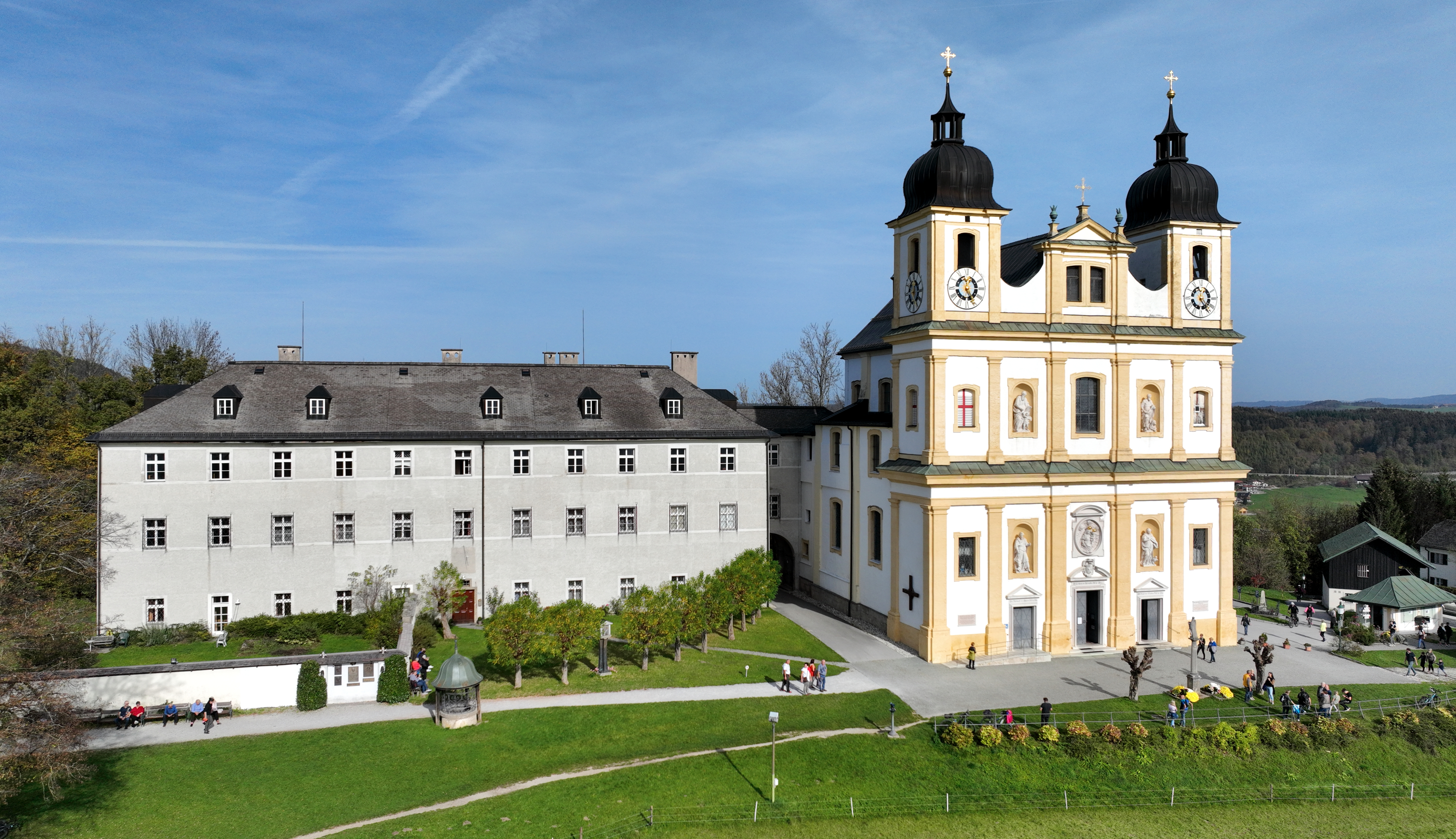
Maria Plain pilgrimage church

Since the establishment of the Maria Plain pilgrimage site in 1674, the Plainberg's identity has been closely tied to it. Shortly after the church's completion, “Plainberg” became synonymous with the sanctuary, as seen in a 1709 biography of Salzburg's Archbishop Johann Ernst von Thun und Hohenstein: “He offered [it] to MARY, the Mother of GOD, on the Plain-Berg in Salzburg, called MARY’s Consolation.” This association continued, evident in Lorenz Hübner's 1792 description of Salzburg's northern surroundings. In 1848, “Plain” stood for the pilgrimage site, and in 1937, the term “Maria Plainberg” appeared. The Plainberg and Maria Plain remain inseparable in public perception.

The erection of the Maria Plain miraculous image triggered an unexpected surge in pilgrimages. Between 1657 and 1674, the basilica's consecration year, approximately 34,000 masses were reportedly held. This led to economic growth, as pilgrims increased demand for hospitality, lodging, and goods, prompting the establishment of shops and inns in Salzburg's Itzling and Lengfelden.

In the 18th century, growing recognition that poverty was not divinely ordained but could be addressed shifted attitudes toward begging. Some viewed the poor as partly responsible for their condition, while others advocated state-led poverty alleviation. The Plainbettel was abolished in 1804, welcomed by authorities but opposed by local merchants.

=== 19th Century and First Republic ===
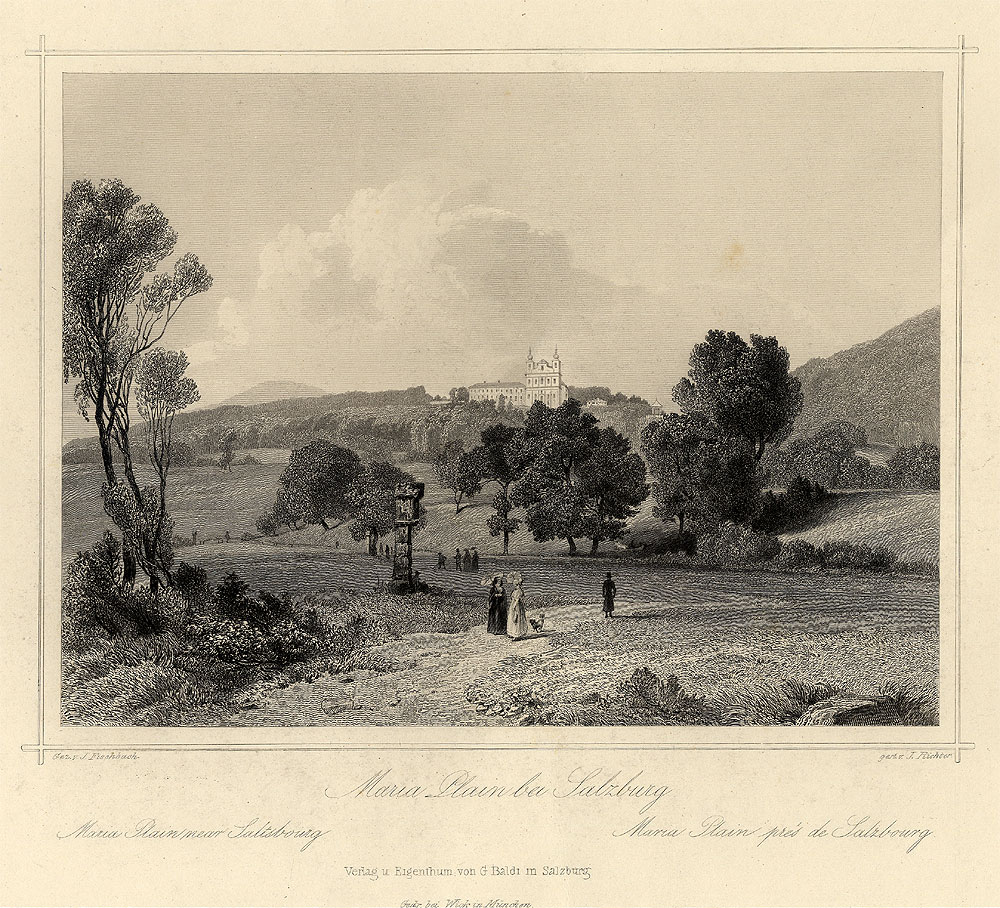
Johann Fischbach: “Maria Plain” – Steel engraving (1852)

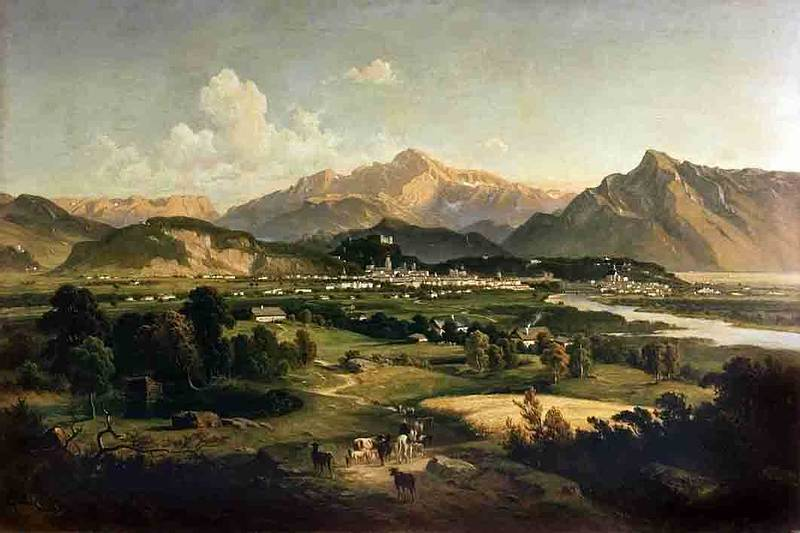
Josef Mayburger: “Salzburg from the Plainberg” – Painting (1881)

During the Napoleonic Wars after 1800, the Bergheim area saw conflicts between France and Austria, but no military actions occurred on the Plainberg, and no reported attacks by French soldiers took place there.

Beyond resident farmers and clergy, the Plainberg attracted new inhabitants by the 19th century, including retired professors from the University of Salzburg, drawn by the scenic southern slope's views.

The Plain locality encompassed most of the Plainberg and adjacent eastern areas, including the modern Hallwang settlement of Berg. Population data for Plain include:

Residences and population in the Plain Locality
Year	Houses	Residents
1812	22	132
1839	21	113
1869	22	133
1890	23	153
1900	25	174
1910	30	263
1991	74	385
2006	N/A	219

The gender ratio was balanced, and the population was almost exclusively Roman Catholic. Detailed data for the Plainberg in 1812 and 1890 include:

Residences and population on the Plainberg
Settlement	1812	1890	
	Residents	Houses	Residents
Gaglham	13	2	N/A
Gaglham incl. Hofstätt and Plainbrücke	N/A	4	46
Kemating	30	6	29
Plain	42	N/A	N/A
Maria Plain incl. Berg–Maria Plain railway stop	N/A	7	34
Radeck	38	6	44

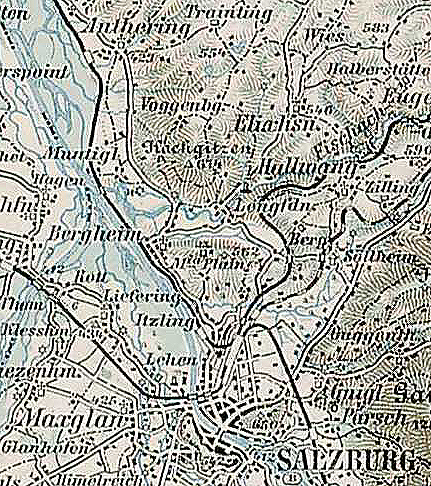
In the Franciscan-Josephine Survey map from the mid-19th century, Maria Plain is the only locality recorded on the Plainberg

Bergheim resisted new social and political movements in the late 19th century, with social democracy and pan-Germanism in the minority, adhering to political Catholicism. In the early 20th century, a Burschenschaftsverein, aligned with the Austrian Farmers’ Association, formed in Bergheim, gathering unmarried farmers and male servants. An annual Burschentag in Maria Plain drew about 300 members, significant given the population.

On April 25, 1901, the first post office in Bergheim was established in Kasern, near the railway, handling mail for the Plainberg, previously managed by Salzburg. Mail was delivered multiple times daily on weekdays, with Sunday deliveries limited to Maria Plain. From August 1, 1912, a limited post office in Bergheim operated under Salzburg 1, with no change in delivery until after 1945, when Bergheim gained its own post office. The Kasern post office closed in 2009, and mail delivery for the Plainberg has since been handled from Salzburg-Itzling.

Before the Salzburg Festival, Friedrich Gehmacher and Heinrich Damisch proposed a concert and opera house on the Plainberg for its scenic views, but the plan was abandoned with the outbreak of World War I.

Post-war, returning soldiers passed through Bergheim, raising fears of looting and violence. In 1920, several assaults occurred in the Plainberg's forest. During the economic crisis, Bergheim issued emergency currency from September 1920 to 1922, with a 10-Heller note depicting the Plainberg's southern side and Maria Plain.

=== National Socialism to present ===
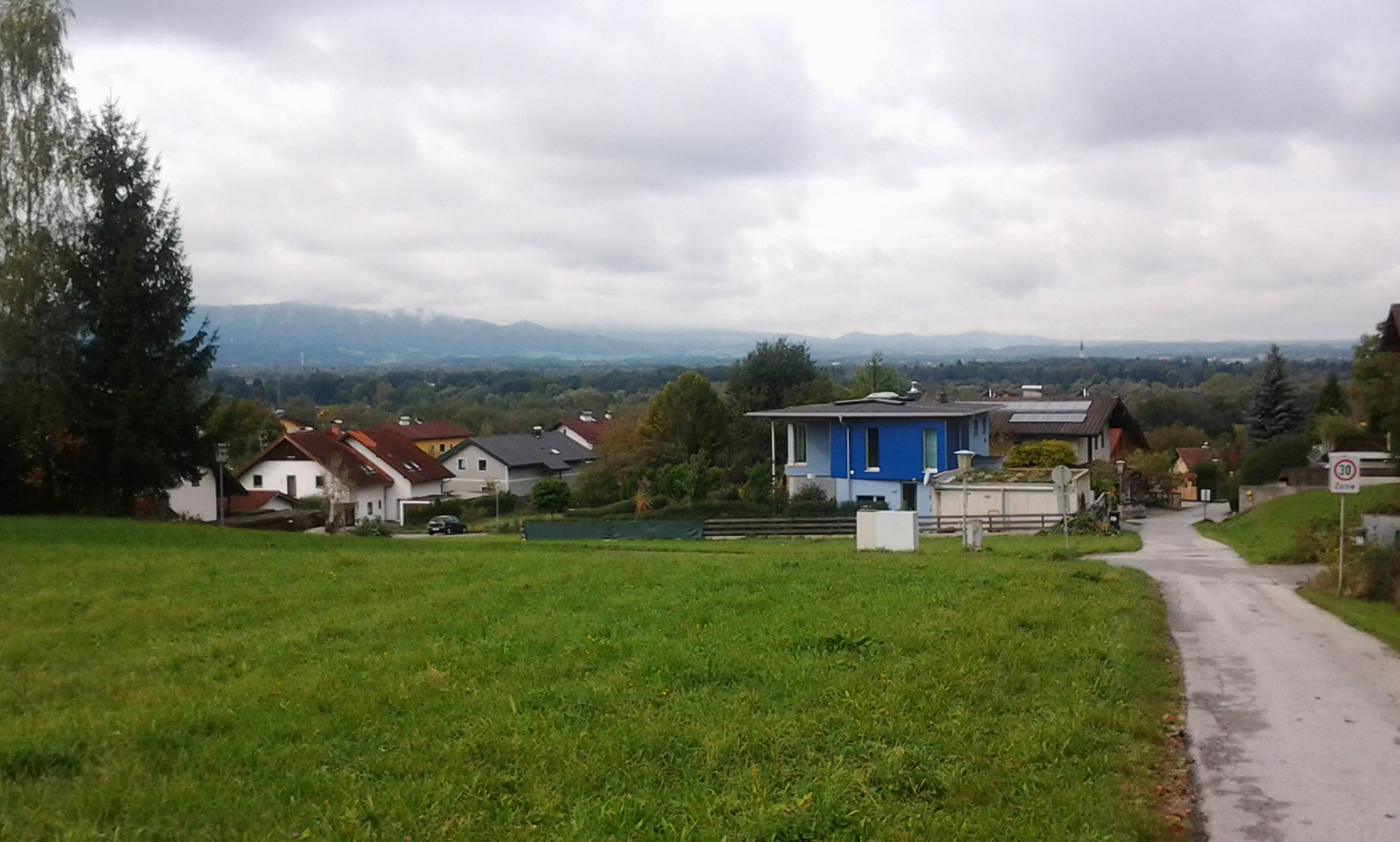
Part of the modern Kirchfeldsiedlung, replacing the Bergheim refugee camp

After Austria's Anschluss in 1938, the Plainberg was annexed to Salzburg but returned to Bergheim after 1959. In 1939–1940, a Reich Labour Service camp was built between Bergheim and Hagenau, used for Plainbach regulation and the West Autobahn (A 1) construction along the southern slope. Post-war, the American occupation established a refugee camp on the site, leased from the Bergheim parish, initially for former Wehrmacht soldiers. By October 1946, the camp's 16 wooden barracks housed 391 people, 95% Danube Swabians. By autumn 1948, it held over 460. The camp developed its own social structure, including a kindergarten, school, food supply, sports clubs, and a police force. A typhus outbreak in 1950 led to a temporary closure. The camp transitioned to self-administration in 1952 and dissolved by the late 1950s after the land was sold to housing cooperatives, now the Kirchfeldsiedlung, home to some former refugees and their descendants.

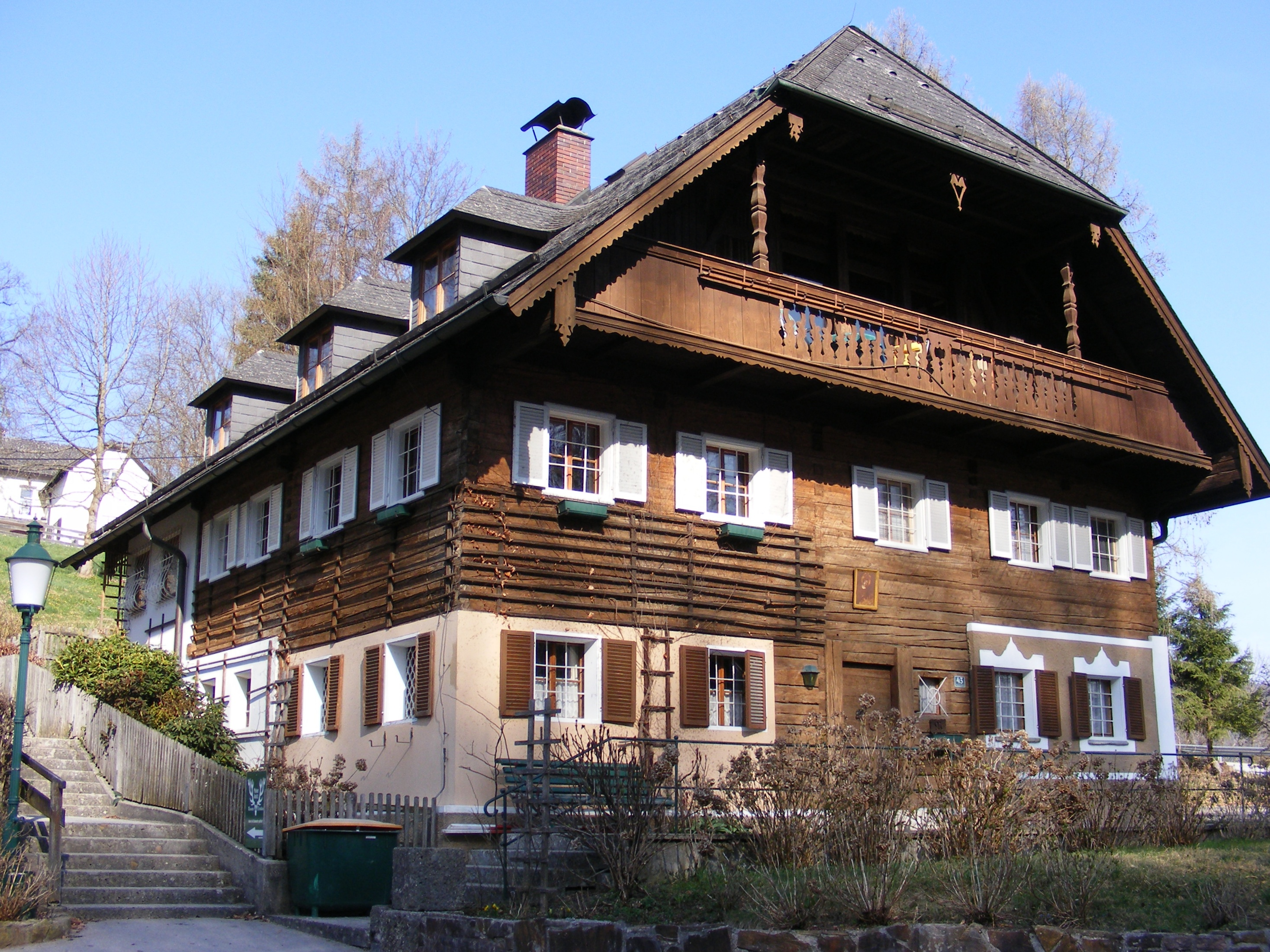
The Bindergut, temporary residence for Maria Plain's Benedictines during wartime

From January 1939, most of the Plainberg was incorporated into Salzburg. In 1941, Maria Plain's clergy were displaced from their superiorate to accommodate children evacuated via Kinderlandverschickung, officially termed Youth Hostel Maria Plain. The priests were housed in the Bindergut. In 1943, a small air-raid shelter for about 30 people was built at the eastern end, the smallest in Salzburg, constructed using forced laborers and prisoners of war.

Post-war, Bergheim negotiated to reclaim the Plainberg by exchanging it for a 35 ha strip along the Salzach, including the slaughterhouse, now Itzling-Nord. This took effect on July 13, 1950. Part of Kasern remained with Salzburg to preserve Bergheim's rural character, despite industrialization beginning around 1900.

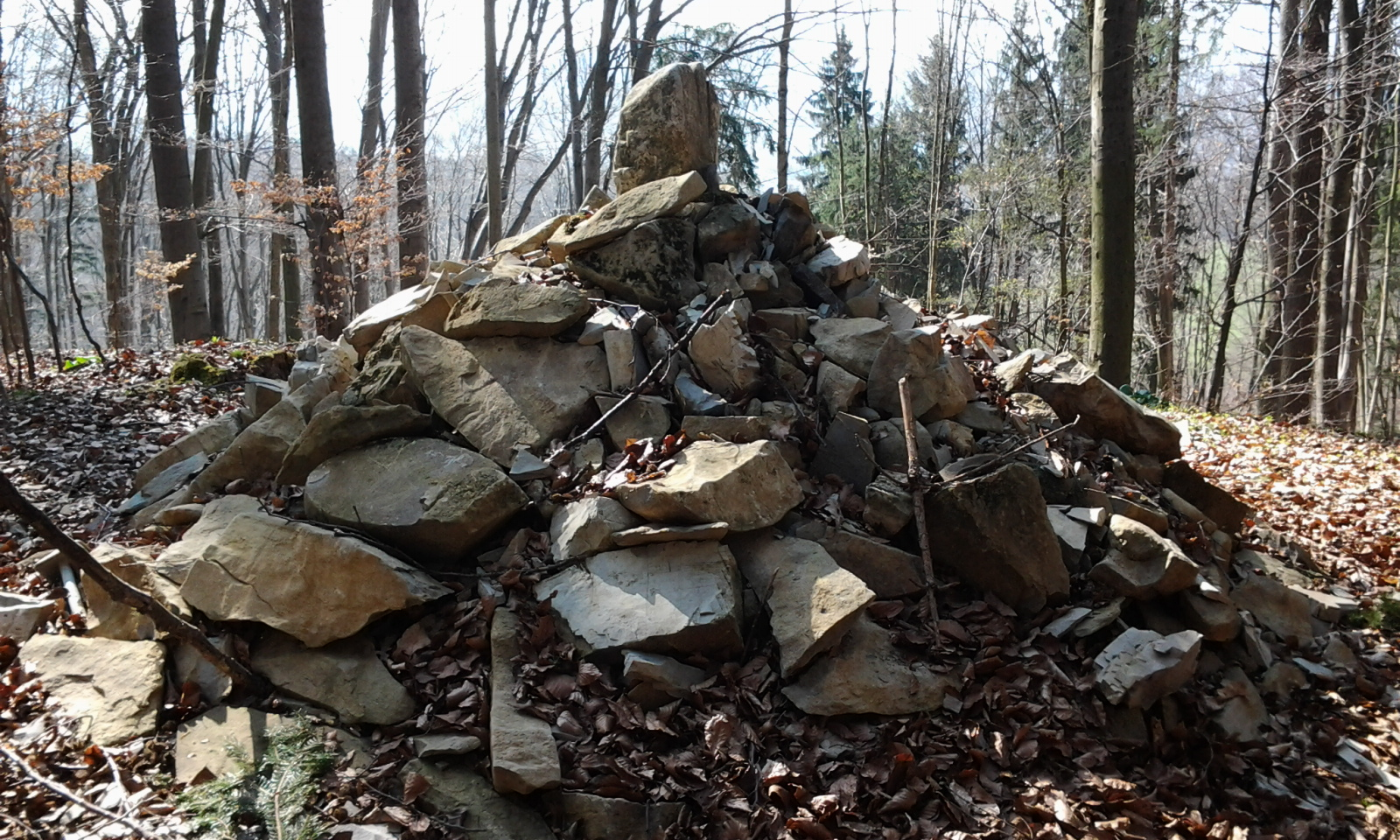
Marker at the highest point of the Plainberg

In 1963, regular waste collection was introduced in parts of Bergheim, including the Plainberg.

Today, the western side with its sacred buildings is popular among walkers and tourists. The rest of the hill is less used for recreation, with unmarked footpaths offering limited views due to tree cover. A recently built forest road from Maria Plain to Radeck in the upper area is not yet mapped.

== Economy ==
=== Agriculture, livestock, and hunting ===
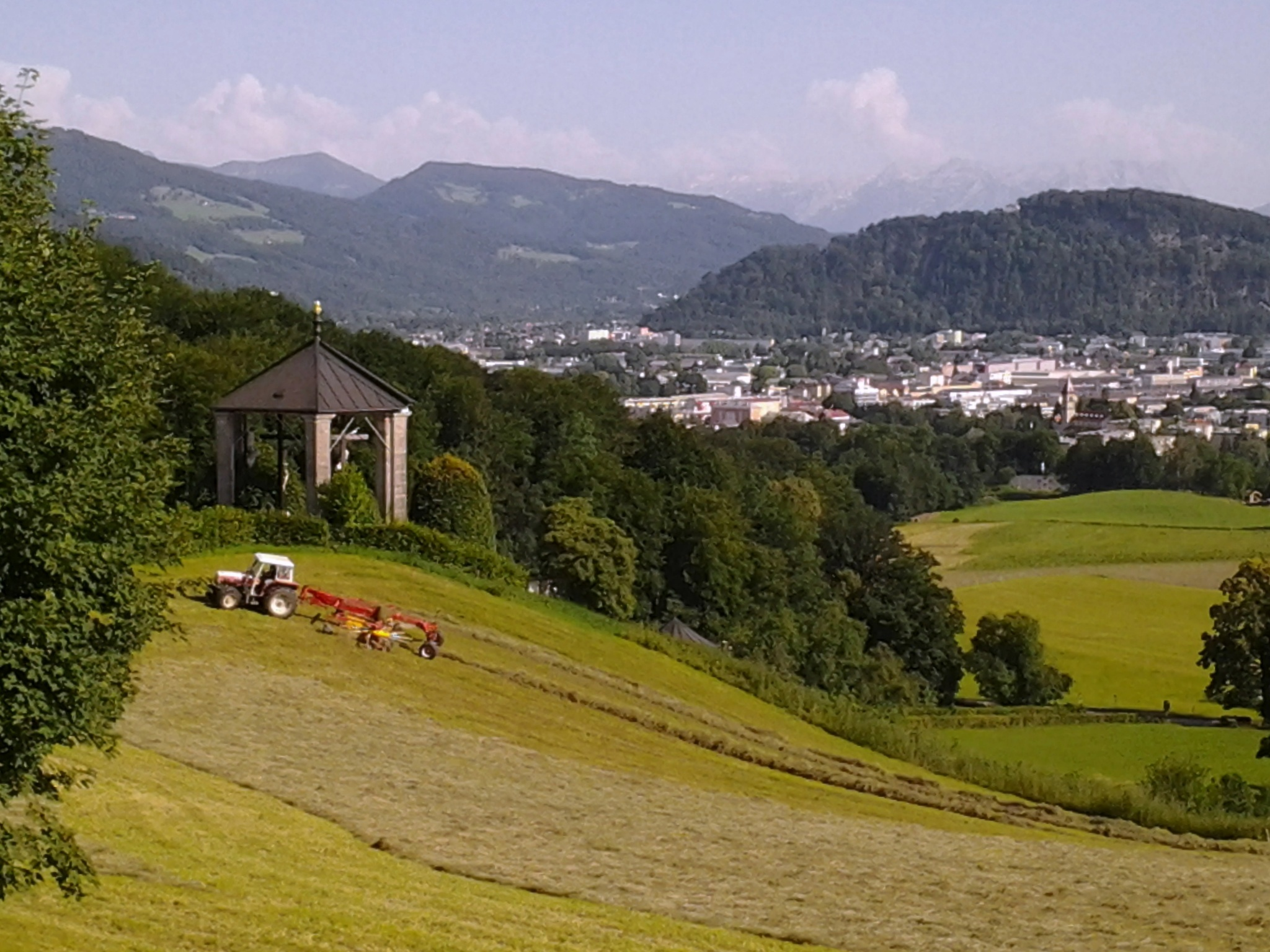
Hay harvest on the Plainberg

Hills in the Flysch Zone typically feature forested areas alongside meadows. The treeless areas were likely used for agriculture in ancient times. Excavations of a Roman-era manor in Kemating suggest that farming was practiced in the area as early as antiquity.

In the early 19th century, reports indicate that the southern slope of the Plainberg had been used for agricultural purposes for centuries. The fields were fertile, and the prosperity of local farmers was evident in their outward wealth. Grain cultivation dominated, with the arable land of the Bergheim cadastral community—largely encompassing the Plainberg—divided in 1833 as follows: one-third for winter grains, one-third for oats, and the remainder for clover, fallow land, and some flax. Livestock consisted almost exclusively of cattle. In 1817, the Plain locality recorded 15 oxen, 47 cows, and one horse, with sheep present in minimal numbers in other Bergheim localities. Throughout the 19th century, cattle numbers likely remained stable, consistent with trends across the state of Salzburg. Today, five active farms remain on the Plainberg, including Radeck.

From 1830 to 1961 (except during the war years of 1940–1944), the “Lorenzimarkt” or “Plainmarkt,” a festive livestock market and kermesse, was held annually on St. Lawrence's Day, August 10, in the meadow in front of the Maria Plain pilgrimage church. This event set livestock prices for the upcoming season, primarily involving trade in horses and cattle, alongside sales of clothing, household goods, and other typical fair items. Livestock trading occurred mainly in the morning, with the afternoon dedicated to socializing. The Plainmarkt was a popular event; for example, consumption included:

8,000 Frankfurter sausages, 4,000 knackwurst, 150 sticks of sliced sausage, an additional 10,000 sausages, 1,200 bratwurst, and 20,000 rolls. The in-house butcher at the adjacent Maria Plain inn slaughtered three bulls, two 600-kilogram heifers, four pigs, and four calves.

The market ceased in 1961 due to challenges in driving livestock to the site amid increasing motorized traffic and competition from the livestock market in Maishofen in the Pinzgau region.

The forests between Maria Plain and Radeck remained undeveloped at least until the High Middle Ages, later serving as hunting grounds. In the 19th century, as in many other rural communities in the region, communal hunting rights in Bergheim were leased to nobles and wealthy citizens for financial reasons. This led to active hunting in Bergheim's forests, with game management tailored to this purpose. Consequently, agricultural fields often suffered damage from wildlife and hunting activities, prompting legal regulations by the century's end to reserve hunting rights for landowners. The once-abundant game population has significantly declined. Bergheim's communal hunting grounds are now primarily located at Hochgitzen, with minimal activity on the Plainberg. While species like wild boar and fallow deer were occasionally hunted in the past, only a roe deer population of approximately 150–200 and a greatly reduced small game population remain today.

=== Industry, commerce, and crafts ===
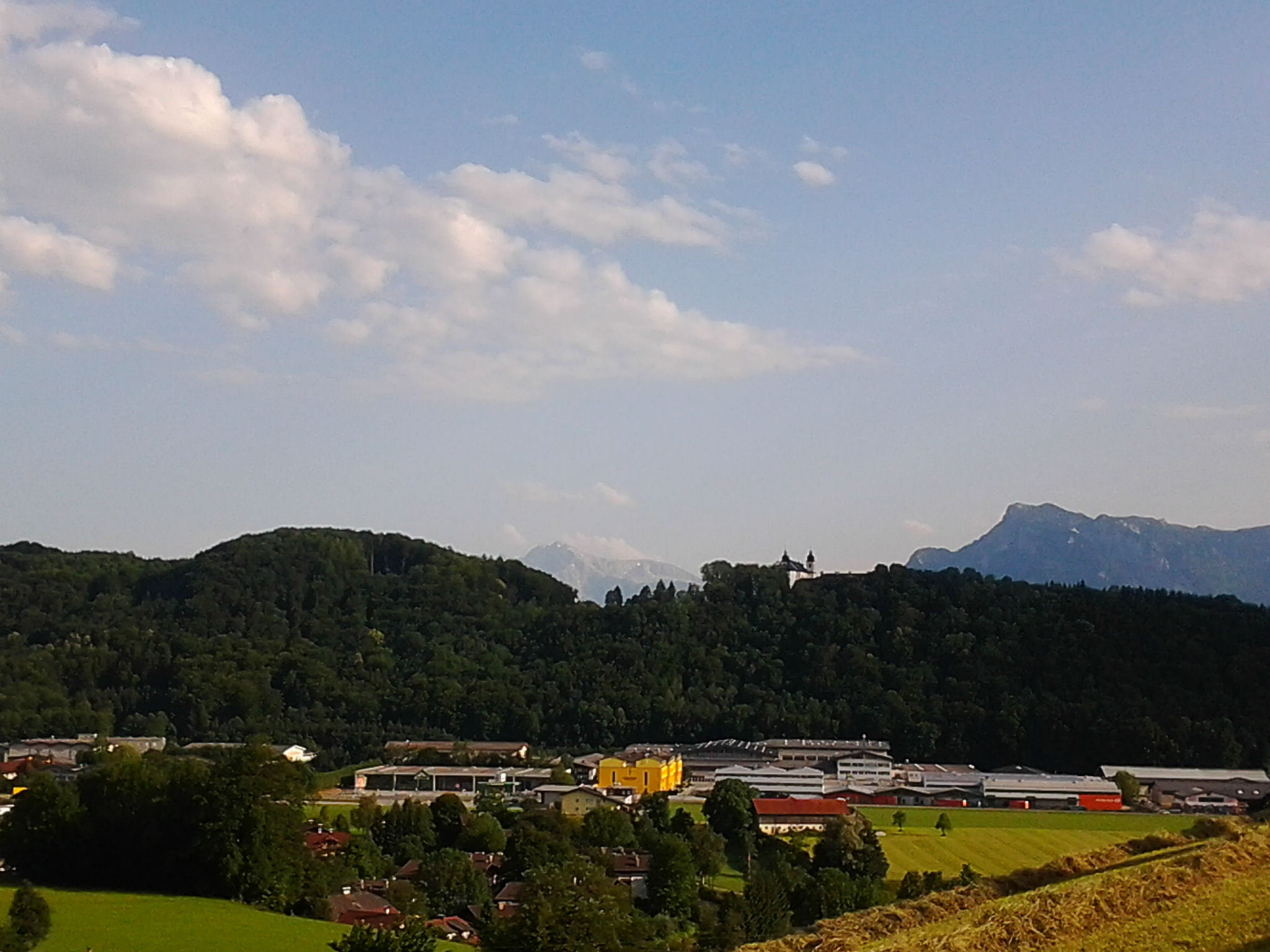
Northern side of the Plainberg with the Bergheim commercial center

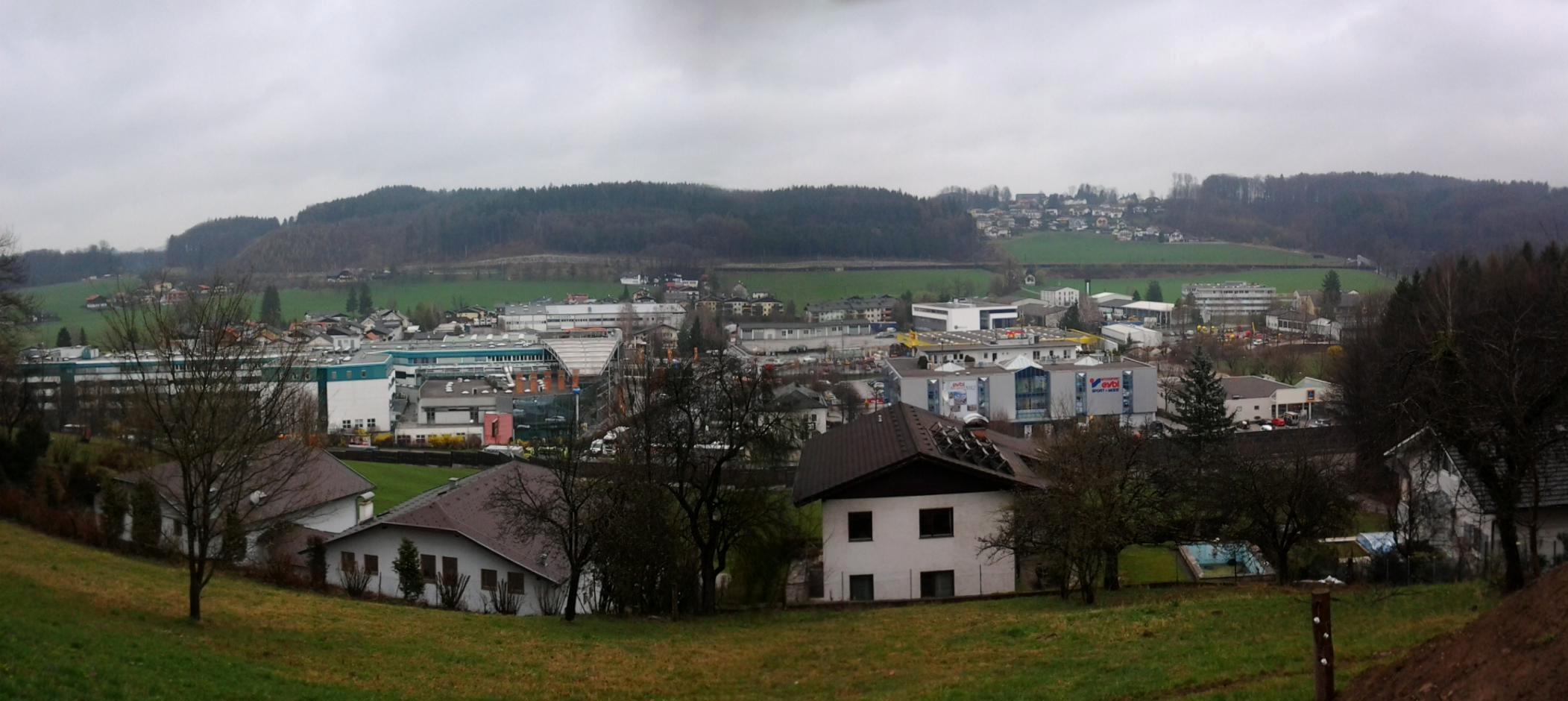
Kasern commercial area

Immediately north of the Plainberg lies the Bergheim commercial center, hosting numerous businesses. Additionally, plans exist to construct a renewable energy facility, the “Ökoenergiepark Bergheim,” at the northern base of the hill.

Just beyond the current Salzburger Straße (B 150), a major road passing the southeastern flank of the hill to the motorway, the “Redlacken” area—now known as Rettenlackstraße—was home to one of three brickworks in and around Salzburg. This site, later called “Röttelacken,” also produced reddish clay used for painting porcelain manufactured in Salzburg's Riedenburg district from 1734 to 1848. The brickworks operated into the first half of the 20th century. During this period, a chemical factory, a bell foundry, and a soap manufactory also established operations there. Peat was extracted in the area earlier, but evidence of this activity is no longer visible. Today, the area hosts various commercial enterprises.

On the western side of the Plainberg, a quarry operated near Bergheim until 1897. Stones quarried there were used as building materials for local religious structures, including the Maria Plain pilgrimage basilica and the Michaelbeuern Abbey. Several quarries also operated east of the Plainberg, with one southeast of Radeck active from the 1880s.

Around the turn of the 20th century, economic activity on the Plainberg was more diverse than today. In addition to agriculture, businesses in Maria Plain in 1901 included one bakery, one butcher, two general stores, one hay merchant, one millwright, one shoemaker, and one innkeeper. Souvenirs and devotional items are still sold near the pilgrimage church today.

The hospitality industry gained prominence on the Plainberg with the rise of pilgrimages. The Maria Plain inn (“Plainwirt”), located next to the pilgrimage basilica, has been operated by the same family since 1654. Originally a residence for priests, it was converted into an inn after they moved to the Maria Plain superiorate building. The structure was rebuilt in 1687. Around the turn of the 20th century, Radeck had two inns: the Schwarz’sche Gasthaus and the Jägerwirt, which still operates. The Jägerwirt included a garden pavilion, now an exhibit at the Salzburg Open-Air Museum in Großgmain since 1994. In 1914, another inn, the still-operating “Plainlinde,” opened on the route from Salzburg at the intersection toward Radeck.

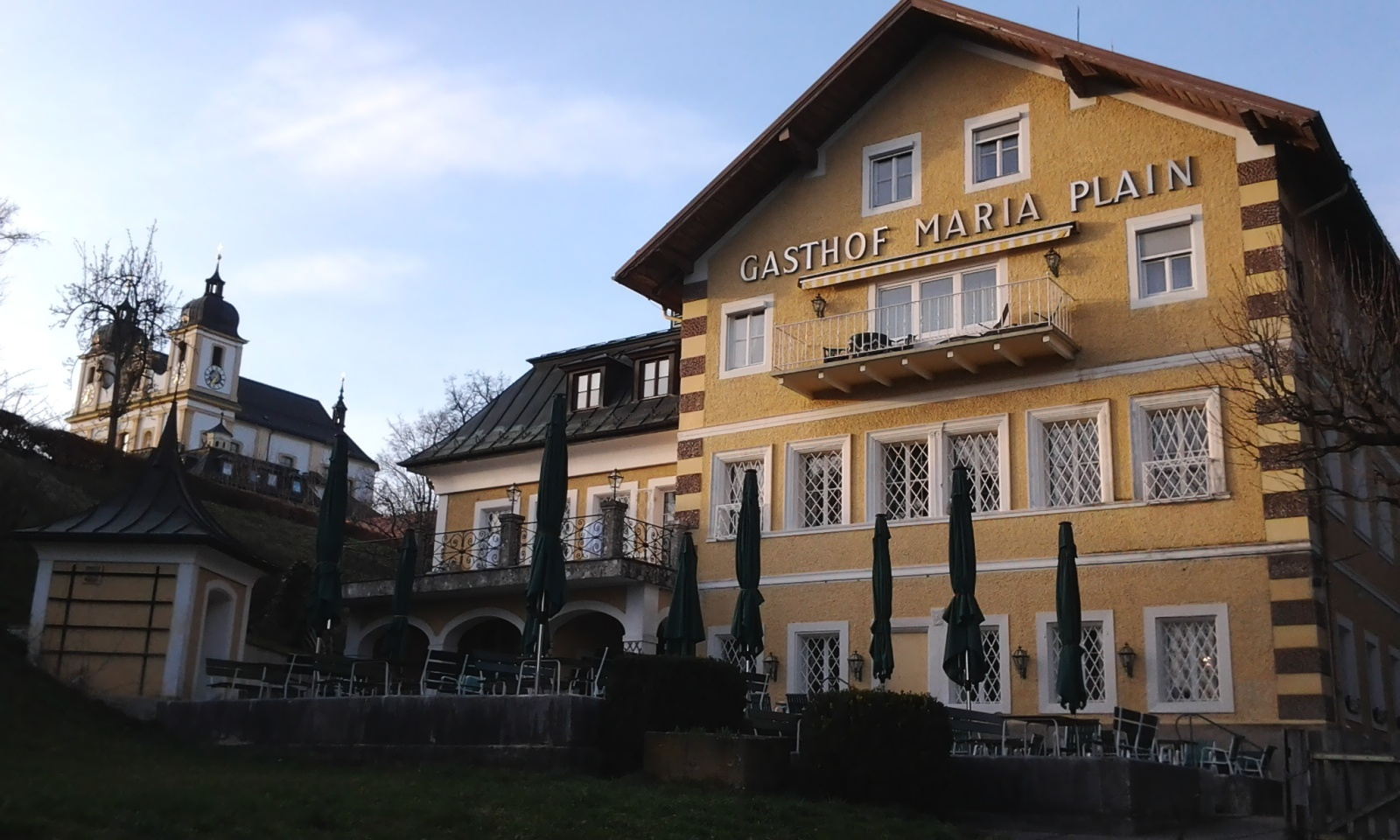
Maria Plain Inn
(Maria Plain)

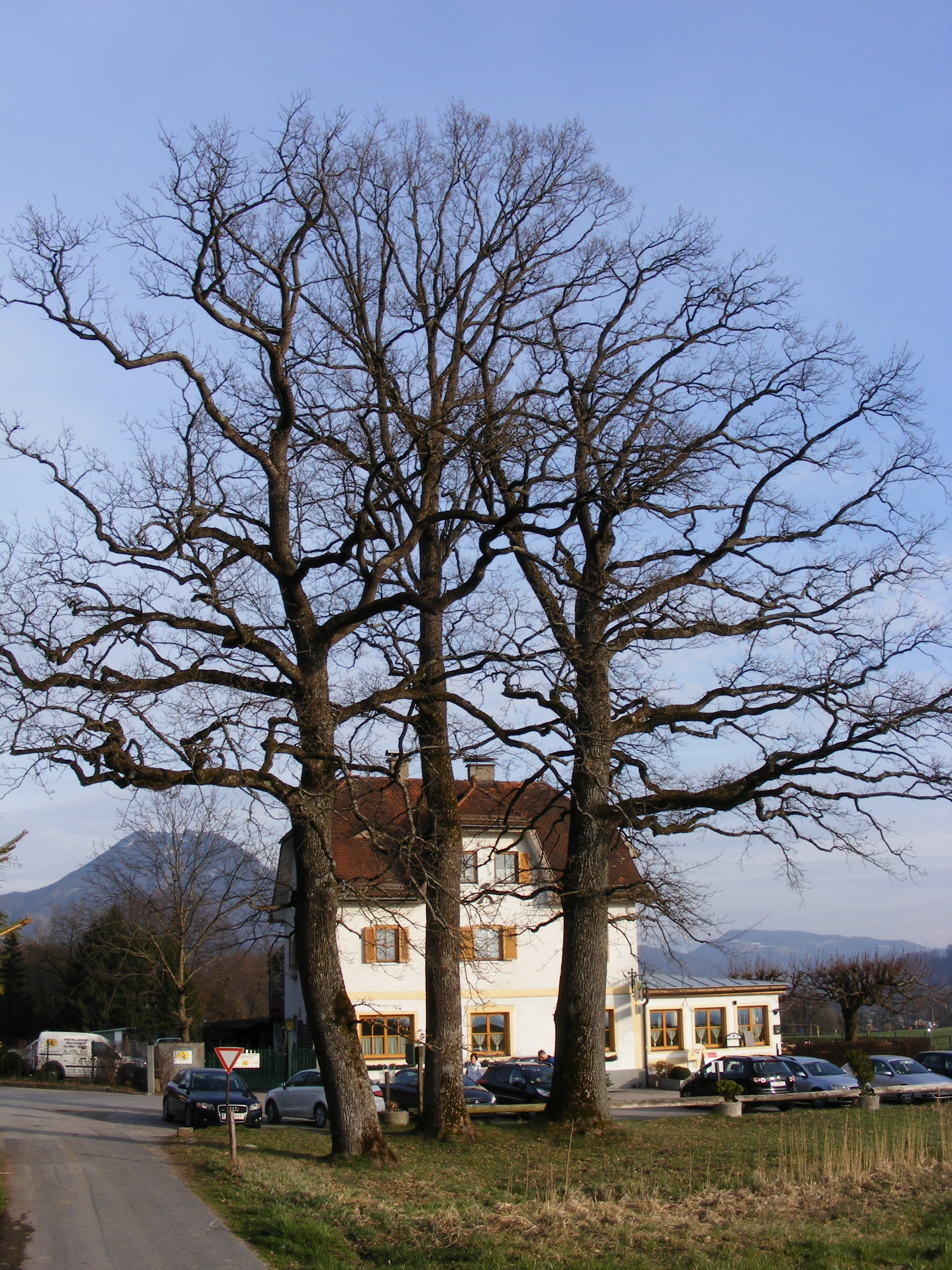
Plainlinde Inn
(Maria Plain)

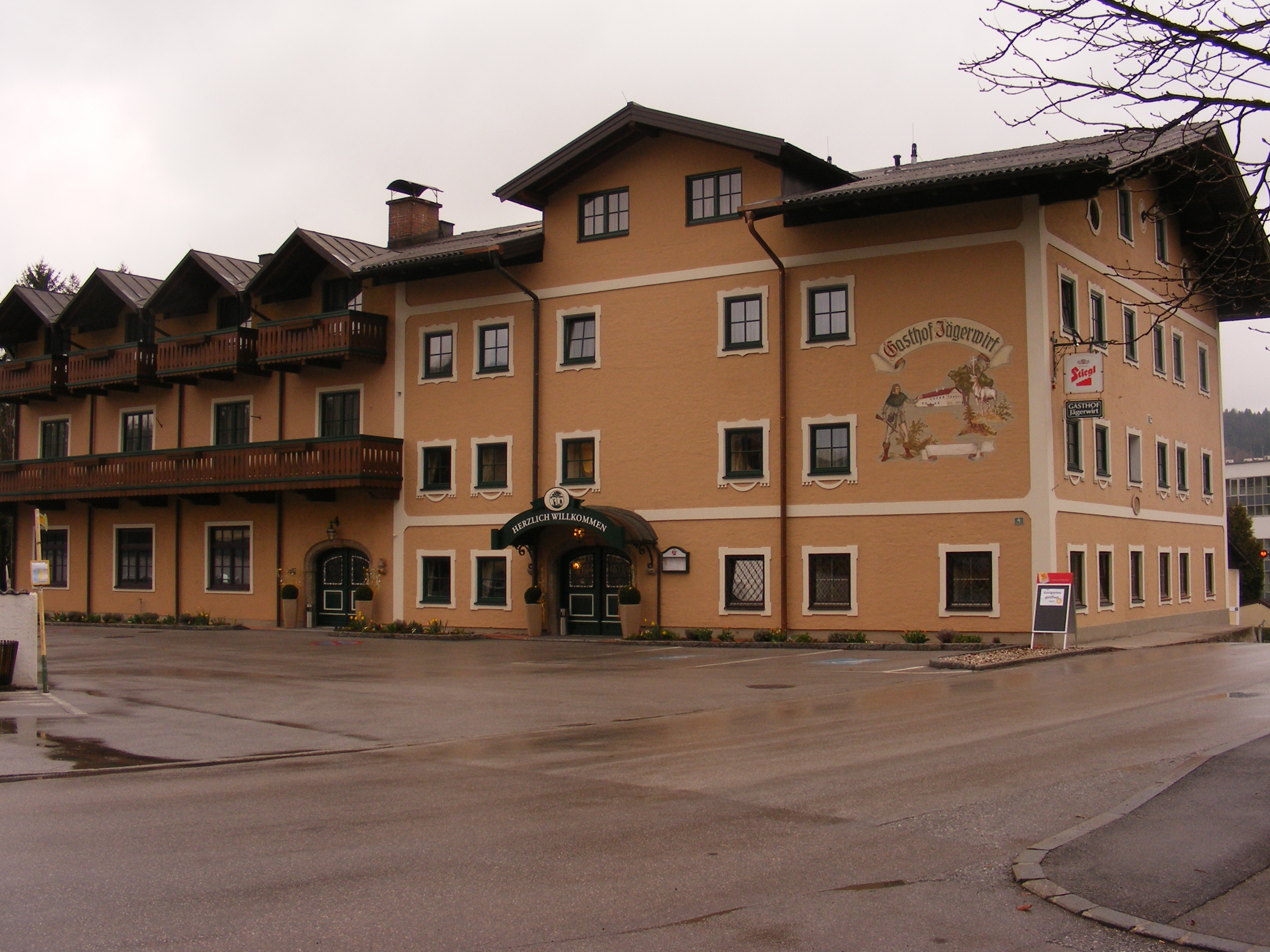
Jägerwirt Inn
(Radeck-Kasern)

Today, hospitality on the Plainberg is driven by the pilgrimage site and related tourism, as well as non-religious recreational visitors. Tourism in Bergheim, measured by overnight stays, more than tripled from 1986 to 2008.

In the Salzburg portion of the Plainberg's southeast, there is a cider tavern and the “Panorama Camping Stadtblick” campsite, which also offers dining facilities.

=== Radiofabrik ===
The “Radiofabrik” is a private radio station in the city of Salzburg, part of the Association of Austrian Community Broadcasters. From 2001, a transmission antenna was located on the roof of the Maria Plain inn next to the basilica but was later relocated to Hochgitzen, a nearby hill in Bergheim, for technical reasons. The new transmission station, established in early 2013, was named “Ada” after the British mathematician and programmer Ada Lovelace (1815–1852).

== Transportation ==
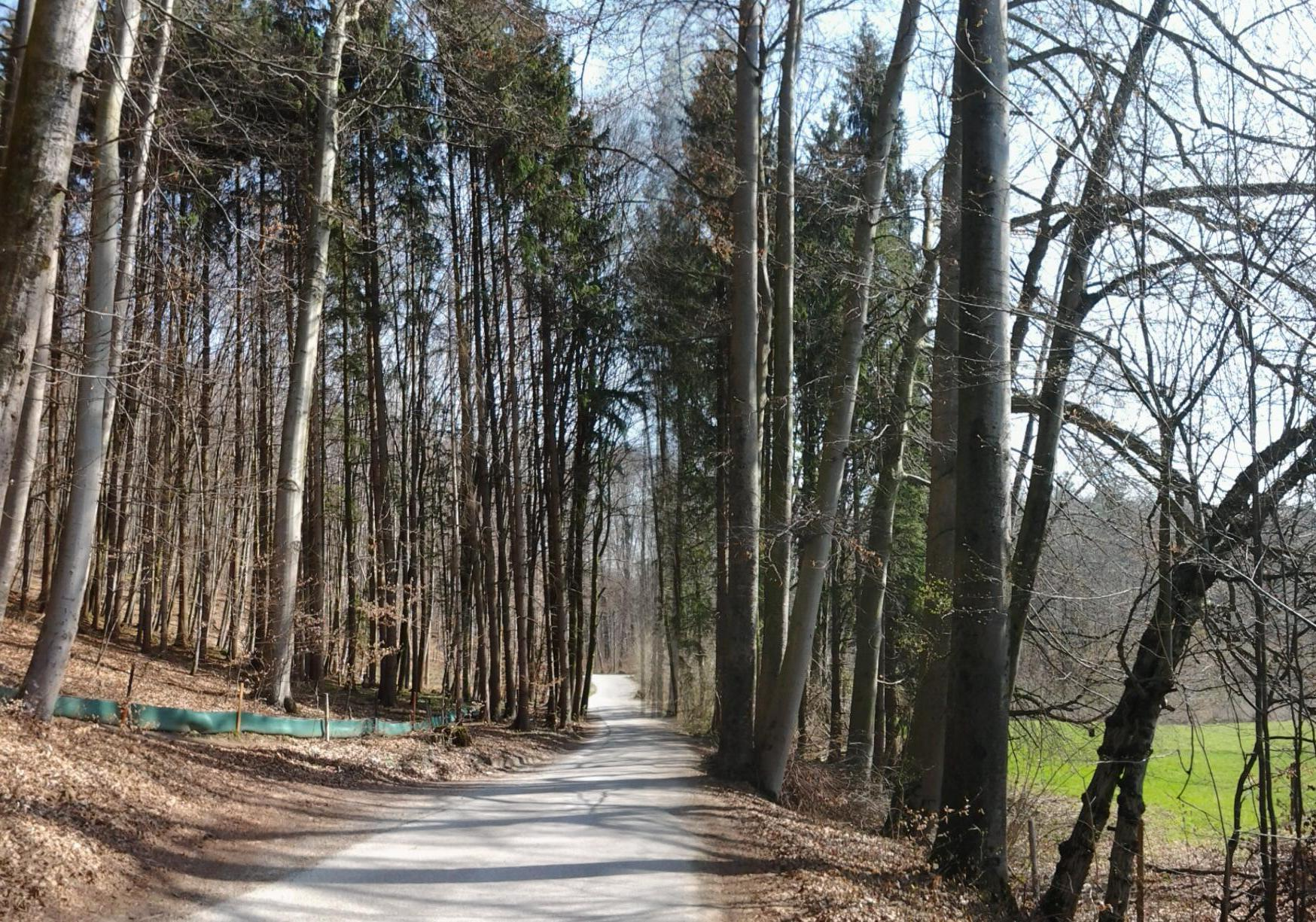
Road from Kemating to Radeck

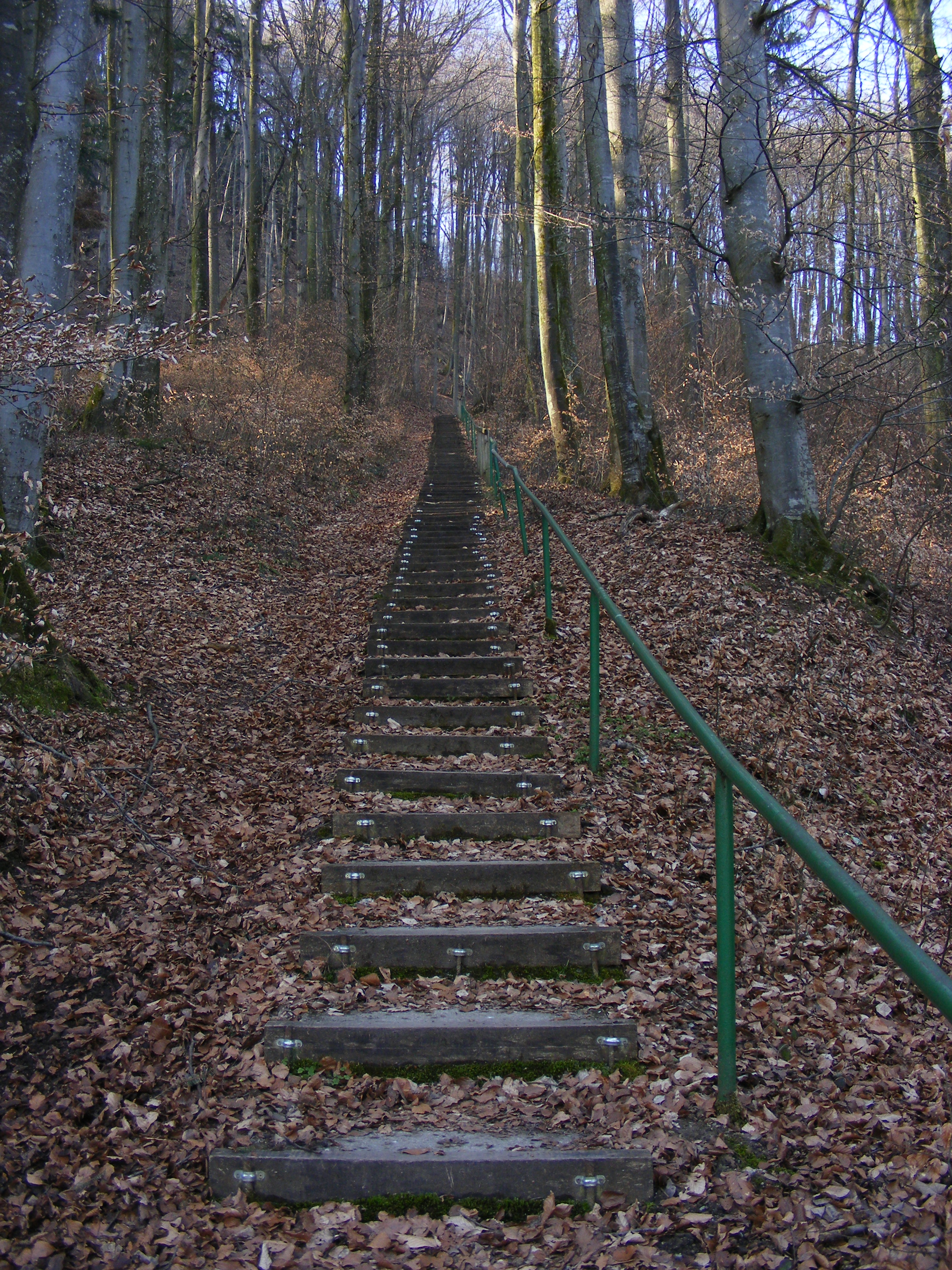
The Plainstiege

The road to Radeck connected to a route from Salzburg's Gnigl district to Lengfelden and further to Upper Austria's Innviertel. Today, this is the four-lane Lamprechtshausener Straße (B 156). Additional access routes include a road from Itzling to Gaglham (named “Gaglhamerweg” since 1944) with a connection to Radeck, as well as roads from Bergheim to Maria Plain and Kemating. Several footpaths exist, including one—rarely used due to limited views—passing over the hill's highest point. The northern descent is accessible only on foot, primarily via a staircase known as the “Plainstiege.” Long-distance trails crossing the Plainberg and passing Maria Plain include the Rupertiweg, Arnoweg, and the Salzburg section of the Austrian Way of St. James.

The West Autobahn (A1) crosses the southern edge of the Plainberg, partly along the Salzburg-Bergheim municipal border, with the Salzburg Nord exit on the eastern side providing access to the B 156 toward central Salzburg and northward.

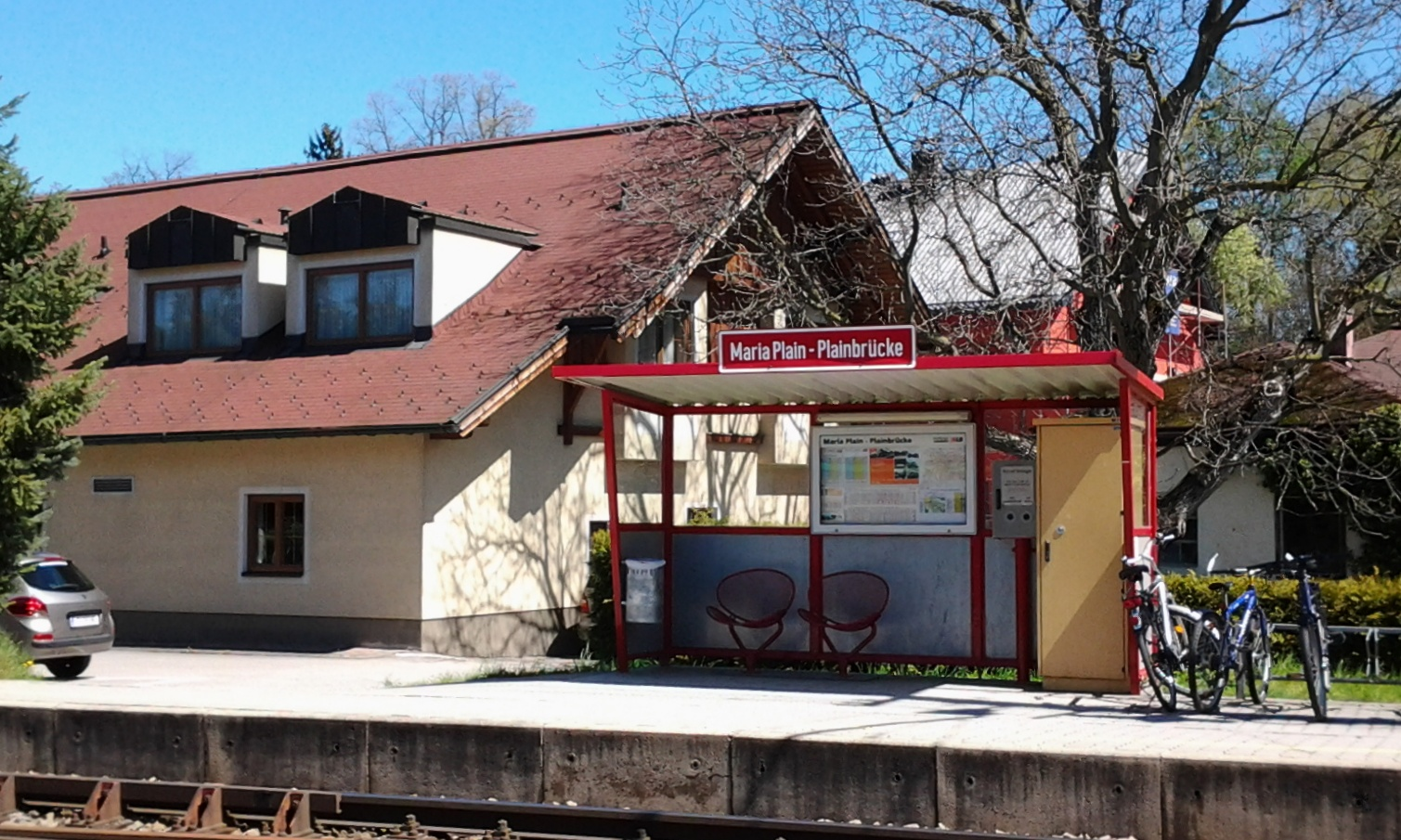
Maria Plain–Plainbrücke stop of the Salzburg Local Railway

On February 1, 1885, the “Berg–Maria Plain” railway stop was established approximately 800 meters east of Radeck, in the Berg settlement (now part of Hallwang), on the Empress Elisabeth Railway, opened in 1860 and now part of the Western Railway at the Salzburg-Kasern stop. In 1886, the Salzburg Local Railway opened, passing below Hagenau on the opposite side of the hill to the former “Maria Plain–Plainbrücke” stop, traversing the Hagenauerberg spur. This line was electrified from Salzburg to Plainbrücke in August 1923 and to Bergheim, including the Hagenau stop, in May 1927. Operations beyond Bergheim switched to electric power in May 1947.

No public transportation directly serves the hill. The closest access is via the Salzburg Local Railway (Maria Plain–Plainbrücke stop), the Salzburg trolleybus line 6 (Plainbrücke stop)—both at the southwestern end—and the city bus line 21 (Jägerwirt stop near Radeck in the east and Plainbachstraße stop near the Plainstiege to the north).

== Structures ==
=== Maria Plain ===
The Plainberg, particularly its western side, is a popular local hill for Salzburg residents. The primary destination is the Maria Plain pilgrimage church, located at 530 meters above sea level and prominently visible to the south. It is considered the most significant pilgrimage site in Salzburg state. The Maria Plain ensemble includes the basilica, built from 1671 to 1674, an adjacent superiorate building constructed around 1675, a Calvary hill with four chapels and a crucifixion group built from 1686 to 1692, a 1692 burial chapel, the Ursprungskapelle (rebuilt in 1710 after a wooden chapel for the Maria Plain miraculous image stood from 1652), and the Schmerzenskapelle, completed in 1734. The entire complex was restored from 2003 to 2009.

Each year on February 2 (Candlemas), a candlelight procession with a traditional candle blessing takes place from the Ursprungskapelle to the basilica.

=== Mystery Pillars ===
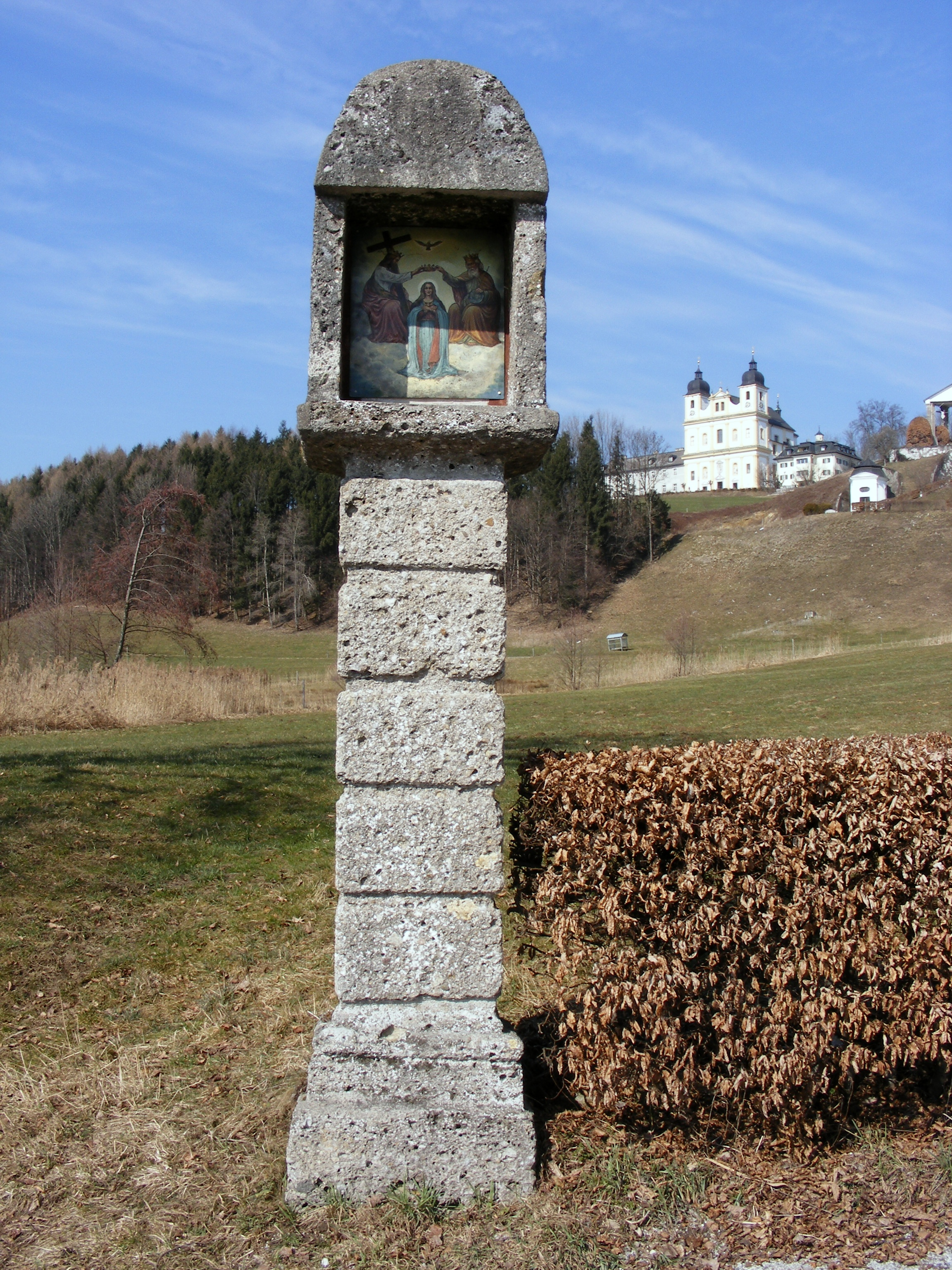
Wayside shrine XV below the Plain church

A pilgrimage path, established in 1705 by a private individual, begins in Salzburg's Elisabeth-Vorstadt district and consists of 15 wayside shrines and a votive pillar, all preserved, restored, or partially rebuilt. The path leads to the Plainberg, ending near the first chapel of the Calvary hill. The oil paintings on the 15 shrines depict the 15 Rosary Mysteries. The series concludes with a votive pillar featuring an image of the Maria Plain miraculous image, text on the path's origin, and the builder's votive inscription. On the Plainberg, shrines IX to XV and the votive pillar stand from the Plainbrücke at the hill's base. A modern shrine, modeled after the mystery pillars, is located directly in front of the superiorate building next to the Maria Plain basilica.

=== Schloss Radeck ===
At the eastern end of the hill stood Schloss Radeck. A castle built around 1225 belonged to the Salzburg archbishops by 1273 and was later overseen by the Maria Plain clergy. It burned down during the Peasants' Revolt of 1525 and was later rebuilt as a castle-like structure. Today, only the chapel, consecrated in 1516, remains, with a bell from 1548 and an altar from the late 17th century. The site is privately owned.

=== Plainbrücke ===
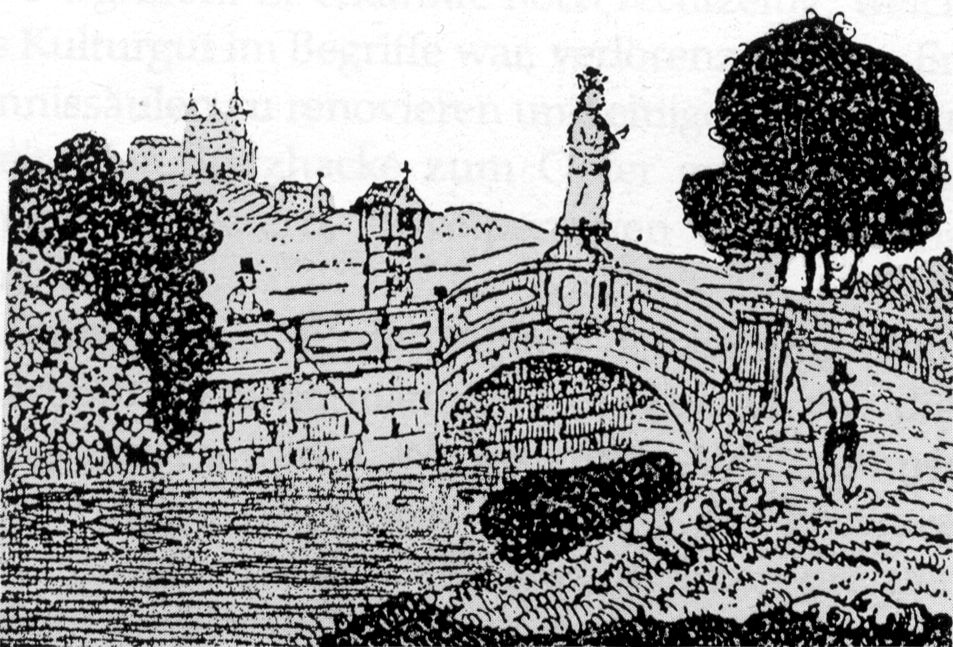
Plainbrücke with the pilgrimage basilica and a mystery pillar (Ignaz Preisinger: “Maria Plain,” c. 1850)

Located at the southwestern end of the Plainberg and closely associated with it, the Plainbrücke in the Itzling district was built in 1733 under Salzburg Archbishop Leopold Anton von Firmian. This stone bridge, constructed from conglomerate blocks, spans the Alterbach. Its side railings date from the Baroque period, while the substructure and surface are modern. A statue of John of Nepomuk stands at the center of the western railing, earning the bridge the occasional name “Nepomuk Bridge.”

At the Plainbrücke, two roads from Salzburg converged: one leading over the Plainberg to Lengfelden and serving as the pilgrimage route to the basilica, and the other heading to Bergheim and northward. The latter, existing since at least the Middle Ages, was less significant historically, as the main northern route ran along the left bank of the Salzach, now in Bavarian territory. In the last century, this route became a major traffic artery, now designated as the Bergheimer Landesstraße (L 118).

== Religion and folk culture ==
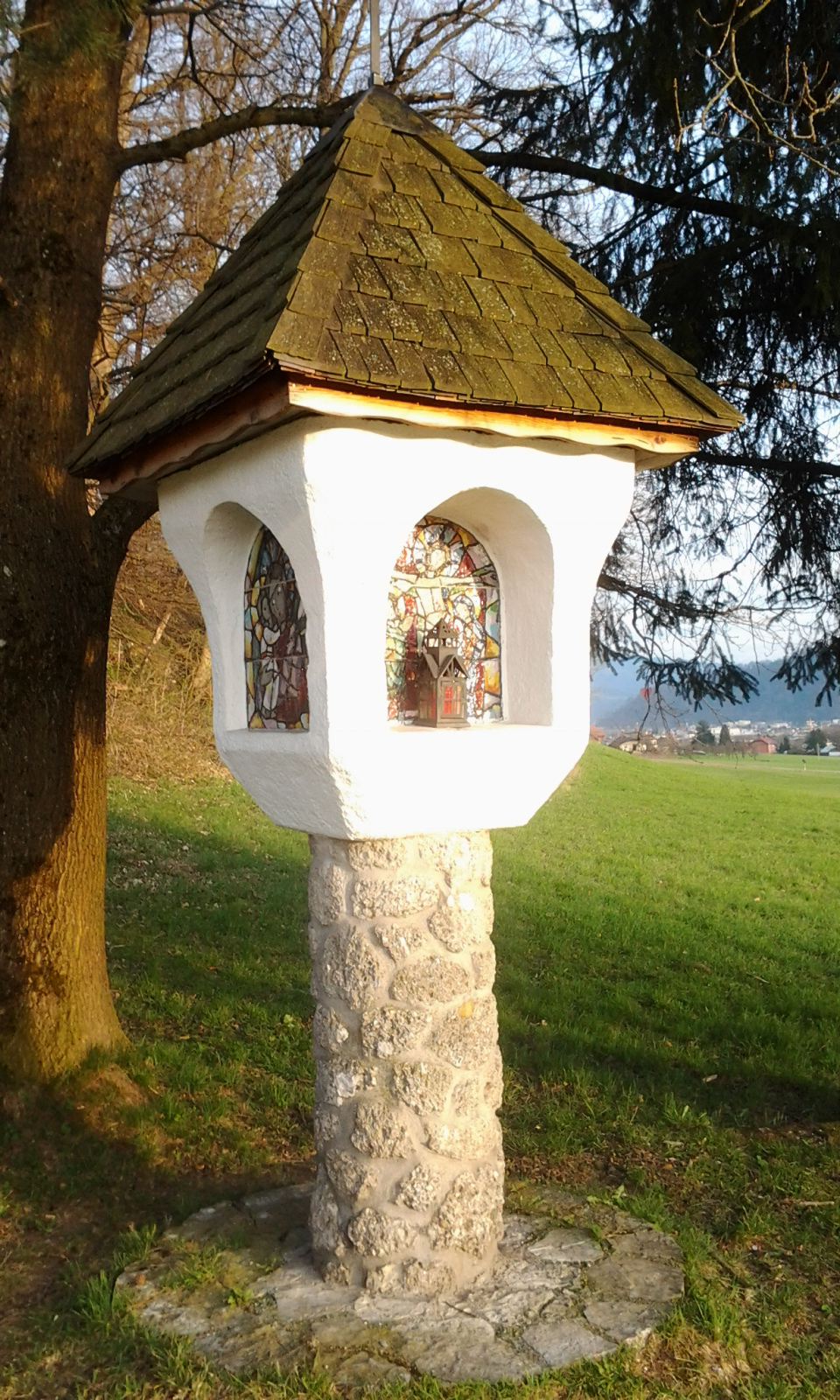
Wayside shrine on the path from Bergheim to the Plain church

=== Religious processions ===
In Catholic tradition, alongside pilgrimages and other processions, the supplicatory procession is a form of religiously motivated walk, typically led by a cross-bearer and often involving the blessing of agricultural fields. In Bergheim, such processions, known as Rogation Days, were held for centuries on the three days before Ascension Day. On the Plainberg, an annual cross procession occurred until 1993 on the day before Ascension Day, and from 1704, an additional procession took place on the Sunday after Corpus Christi. Following a reorganization, a star pilgrimage to Maria Plain now occurs annually on the Tuesday before Pentecost, starting from the Bergheim parish church, the Radeck chapel, and Lengfelden. Additionally, every other year (alternating with another route), a supplicatory procession travels from the Bergheim parish church to Radeck on the Tuesday before Ascension Day.

=== The Augenbründl ===
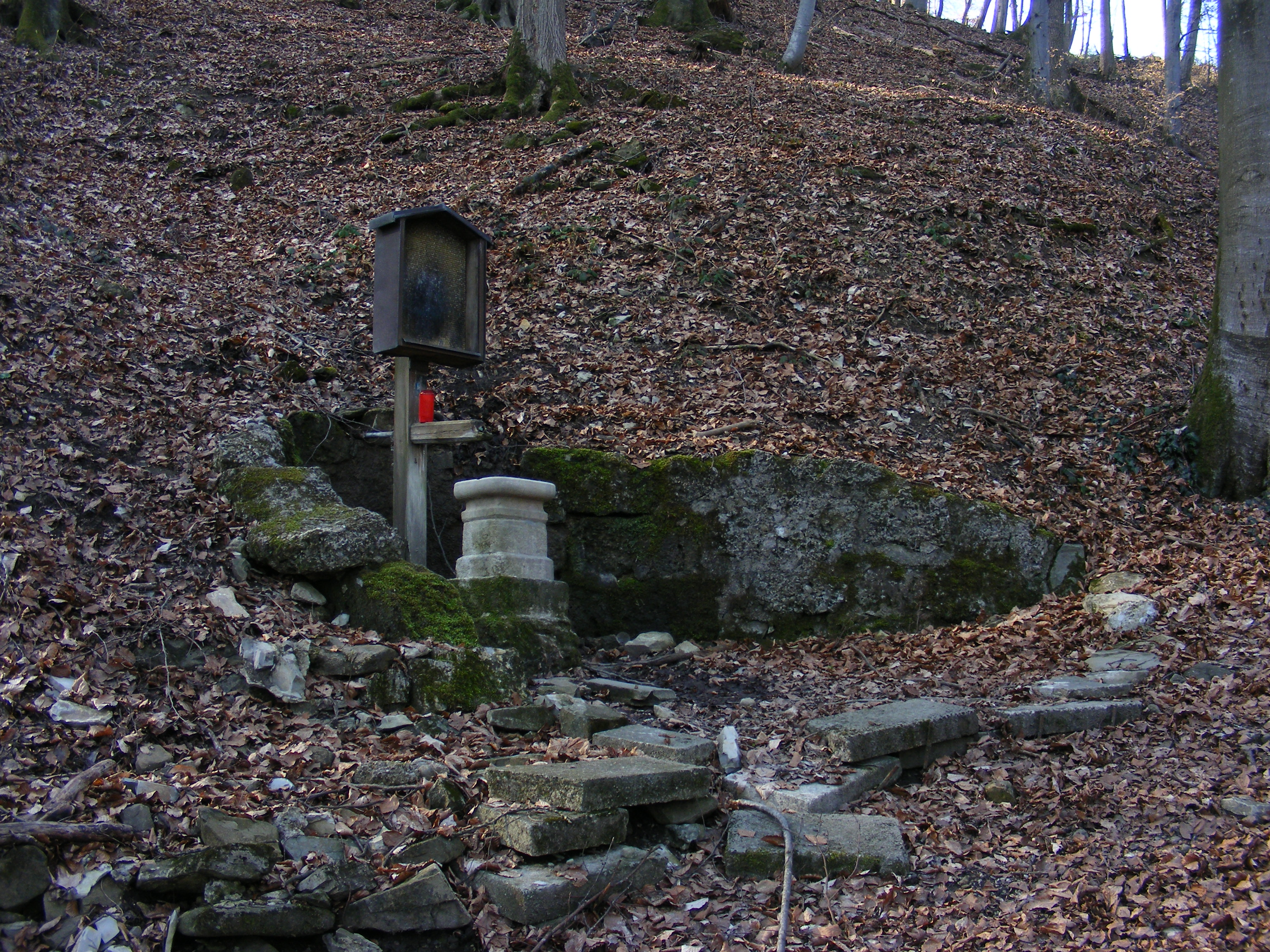
The Augenbründl

Near the hilltop with the Maria Plain church, on the northern side beside the Plainstiege, lies the “Jakobsbründl” or “Augenbründl,” a spring considered holy in folk belief. The following legend explains its origin:

Once […] a priest was walking from the Plainberg to Lengfelden to bring the viaticum to a sick person and bless their soul. It was deep winter, and an icy crust covered the steps of the Plainstiege. Lost in prayer, the priest slipped, and to his horror, the host fell into the snow. In his distress, he prayed to the Miraculous Mother of Plain […] When he rose with the help of the sacristan, he noticed that the snow had melted where the holy host had fallen, and a small spring bubbled up […]

— Salzburger Bauernkalender 1928, p. 68

Previously, a stone shrine with a triptych stood at the spring. The central image depicted Jesus at the Jacob's Well, with an inscription along the frame: “The water you draw here quenches thirst only briefly, but the water I give you quenches it for eternity.” Today, a simple, now-deteriorated wooden shrine with an image of the Maria Plain miraculous image stands beside the spring. The water is believed to have health benefits, and the site is considered a “place of power” in esoteric circles.

=== Customs and music ===
In 1965–66, the Radeck rifle shooters’ association was formed. Its flag features the coat of arms of the former Lords of Radeck on one side and an image of the Radeck castle chapel on the other. The traditional attire includes a hat with cock feathers.

Midsummer bonfires are occasionally lit on the Plainberg during the summer solstice.

The hill has inspired the names of a folk music ensemble and a Krampus group. The Bergheim-based Vocalensemble Maria Plain performs works from the Baroque period and First Viennese School. Additionally, a Bavarian polka called “Plainberg-Boarischer” was composed by Salzburg musician Tobi Reiser.
