= Bergheim, Austria =

Bergheim
- Municipality
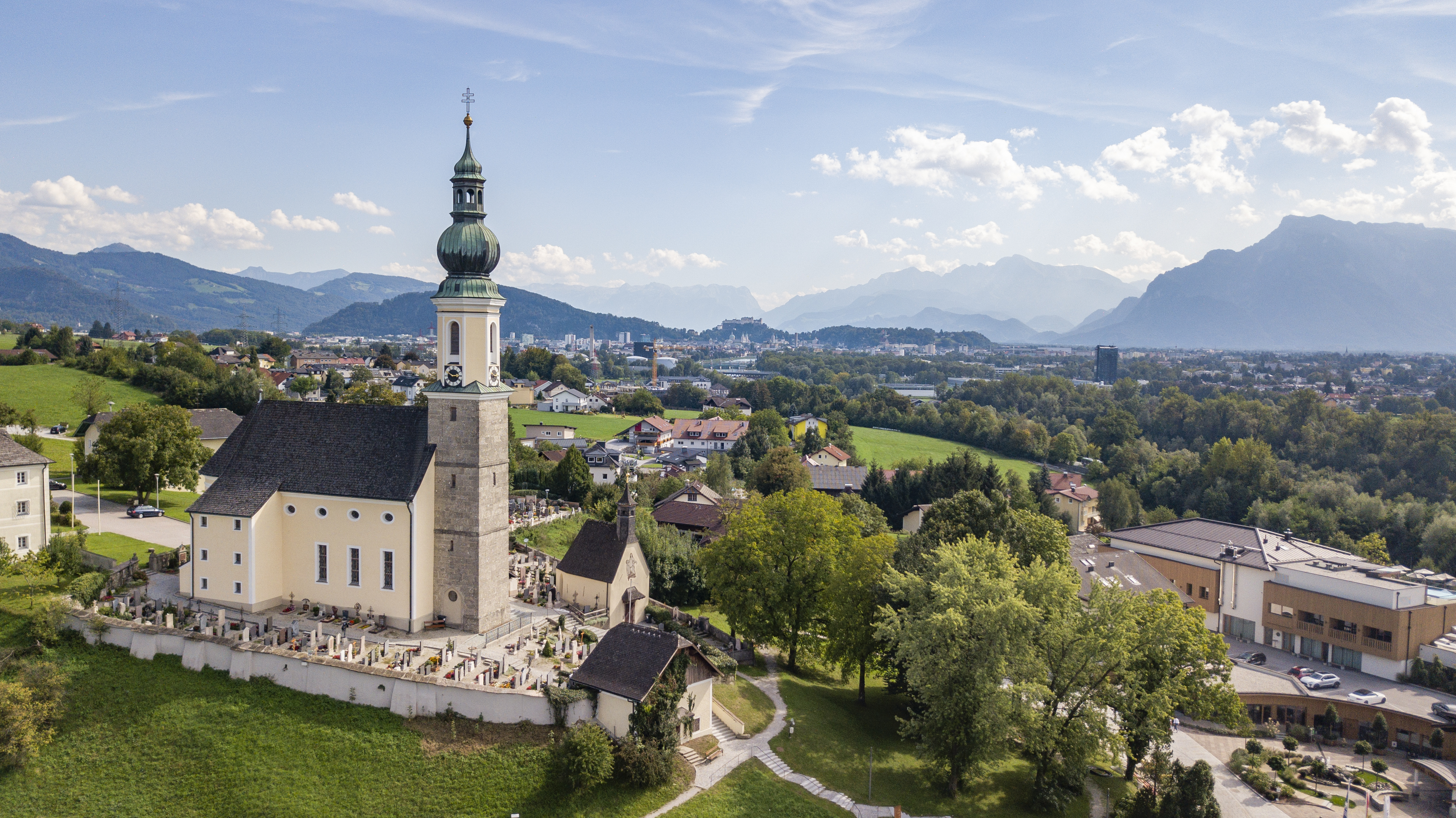

- Flag Coat of arms

- Location within Austria
- Coordinates: 47°50′25″N 13°01′20″E
- Country: Austria
- State: Salzburg
- District: Salzburg-Umgebung

Government
  - Mayor: Johann Hutzinger (ÖVP)

Area
  - Total: 15.2 km^{2} (5.9 sq mi)
- Elevation: 435 m (1,427 ft)

Population (2018-01-01)
  - Total: 5,388
  - Density: 354/km^{2} (918/sq mi)
- Time zone: UTC+1 (CET)
  - Summer (DST): UTC+2 (CEST)
- Postal code: 5101
- Area code: 0662
- Vehicle registration: SL
- Website: www.bergheim.at

Bergheim (German pronunciation: [ˈbɛʁkˌhaɪ̯m]) is a municipality in the district of Salzburg-Umgebung in the state of Salzburg in Austria. The Plainberg with its Maria Plain pilgrimage church forms the border between Bergheim and the city of Salzburg to the south.

== History ==
The area occupied by modern-day Bergheim has been constantly inhabited since Paleolithic times (10,000 B.C.), as evidenced by archaeological finds on Muntigler Hill. Other finds from the Neolithic (3rd century B.C.) point to uninterrupted inhabitation of the area from prehistoric times onward.

In the first century, B.C., the Celts began settling in the area. The Celtic kingdom of Noricum was incorporated into the Roman Empire in 16 B.C. Two Roman manors believed to date from this period have been excavated in nearby Kerath and Kemating. In the year 488 B.C. the Romans withdrew on the orders of King Odoacer.

Around the year 650 the Germanic Bavarii began to settle in the Salzburg area. One of the largest burial grounds in the Flachgau district, unearthed in 1896 near the parish church, dates from this period. The name Bergheim is believed to have originated during this period, the suffix -heim being a typical place name given by the Bavarii. The earliest documented appearance of the name dates from 927 A.D. in a title transferring ownership of the church and its goods from Archbishop Adalbert to a Deacon Reginold.

In the 12th and 13th centuries, the Lords of Bergheim held important positions in the Archbishopric of Salzburg, benefitting the municipality with fishing rights and the right to tithe and hold court. After the ruling Bergheim and Radecker families died out in the late 14th century, ownership transferred to the Archbishopric of Salzburg and the law court was moved to Radeck.

During the Napoleonic Wars (1792–1815) much of Bergheim was destroyed as the French Army crossed the SalzachRiver at Laufen and laid siege to Salzburg. When the Kingdom of Bavaria ceded the state of Salzburg to the Austrian Empire in 1816, Bergheim became a border town and has remained on the Austrian-German border ever since.
