= 2015 Morocco Tennis Tour – Casablanca II – Singles =

Casablanca II – Singles
- 2015 Morocco Tennis Tour – Casablanca II

Final
- Champion: (Bosnia and Herzegovina) Damir Džumhur
- Runner-up: (Spain) Daniel Muñoz de la Nava
- Score: 3–6, 6–3, 6–2

Events
Singles	Doubles
- Morocco Tennis Tour – Casablanca II

This was the first edition of the tournament, Damir Džumhur won the title defeating Daniel Muñoz de la Nava in the final

== Seeds ==
1. (Italy) Paolo Lorenzi (first round)
2. (Spain) Daniel Gimeno-Traver (first round)
3. (Spain) Daniel Muñoz de la Nava (final)
4. (Bosnia and Herzegovina) Damir Džumhur (champion)
5. (Spain) Íñigo Cervantes (quarterfinals)
6. (Spain) Albert Montañés (semifinals)
7. (Japan) Taro Daniel (semifinals)
8. (Spain) Roberto Carballés Baena (quarterfinals)

== Draw ==
Key

- Q = Qualifier
- WC = Wild card
- LL = Lucky loser
- Alt = Alternate
- ITF = ITF entry
- PR = Protected ranking
- SR = Special ranking
- SE = Special exempt
- JE = Junior exempt
- JR = Junior Accelerator Programme entrant
- CO = College Accelerator Programme entrant
- NG = Next Gen Accelerator Program entrant
- w/o = Walkover
- r = Retired
- d = Defaulted

=== Finals ===
Semifinals
6	(Spain) Albert Montañés	4	3
3	(Spain) Daniel Muñoz de la Nava	6	6
4	(Bosnia and Herzegovina) Damir Džumhur	4	6	7
7	(Japan) Taro Daniel	6	1	5

Final
3	(Spain) Daniel Muñoz de la Nava	6	3	2
4	(Bosnia and Herzegovina) Damir Džumhur	3	6	6

=== Top half ===
First round
1	(Italy) P Lorenzi	3	2
Q	(Serbia) L Djere	6	6
(France) M Chazal	6	6
WC	(Morocco) Y Idmbarek	2	1
(Slovakia) J Kovalík	7^{11}	2	7^{7}
(Spain) R Ramírez Hidalgo	6^{9}	6	6^{1}
WC	(Morocco) H Khaddari	2	2
6	(Spain) A Montañés	6	6
3	(Spain) D Muñoz de la Nava	3	6	6
Q	(Serbia) D Petrović	6	1	3
SE	(Poland) K Majchrzak	6	6
WC	(Morocco) A Ahouda	0	3
PR	(Spain) J Martí	6	6
(Italy) S Caruso	3	2
(France) M Bourgue	0	3
8	(Spain) R Carballés Baena	6	6

Second round
Q	(Serbia) L Djere	6	6
(France) M Chazal	3	3
(Slovakia) J Kovalík	5	7	3
6	(Spain) A Montañés	7	5	6
3	(Spain) D Muñoz de la Nava	6	6
SE	(Poland) K Majchrzak	2	4
PR	(Spain) J Martí	5	4
8	(Spain) R Carballés Baena	7	6

Quarterfinals
Q	(Serbia) L Djere	7^{7}	4	1
6	(Spain) A Montañés	6^{5}	6	6
3	(Spain) D Muñoz de la Nava	6	7^{7}
8	(Spain) R Carballés Baena	3	6^{2}

Semifinals
6	(Spain) A Montañés	4	3
3	(Spain) D Muñoz de la Nava	6	6

=== Bottom half ===
First round
5	(Spain) Í Cervantes	6	7^{7}
(Serbia) M Zekić	4	6^{2}
Q	(France) M Hamou	3	2
(Spain) O Roca Batalla	6	6
Q	(Poland) M Gawron	4	6	5
(Egypt) M Safwat	6	4	7
(Romania) A Ungur	5	3
4	(Bosnia and Herzegovina) D Džumhur	7	6
7	(Japan) T Daniel	7^{7}	6
(Argentina) P Cachin	6^{5}	3
(Spain) P Riba	6	6
WC	(Morocco) Y Rachidi	1	2
(Lithuania) L Grigelis	5	0
(Morocco) L Ouahab	7	6
(Netherlands) T de Bakker	6	6
2	(Spain) D Gimeno-Traver	4	4

Second round
5	(Spain) Í Cervantes	6	6
(Spain) O Roca Batalla	2	4
(Egypt) M Safwat	4	1
4	(Bosnia and Herzegovina) D Džumhur	6	6
7	(Japan) T Daniel	3	6	6
(Spain) P Riba	6	2	3
(Morocco) L Ouahab	3	5
(Netherlands) T de Bakker	6	7

Quarterfinals
5	(Spain) Í Cervantes	4	6	2
4	(Bosnia and Herzegovina) D Džumhur	6	3	6
7	(Japan) T Daniel	6^{3}	6	6
(Netherlands) T de Bakker	7^{7}	4	4

Semifinals
4	(Bosnia and Herzegovina) D Džumhur	4	6	7
7	(Japan) T Daniel	6	1	5
