= 2016 Morocco Tennis Tour – Casablanca II – Singles =

Casablanca II – Singles
- 2016 Morocco Tennis Tour – Casablanca II

Final
- Champion: (France) Maxime Janvier
- Runner-up: (Greece) Stefanos Tsitsipas
- Score: 6–4, 6–0

Events
Singles	Doubles
- Morocco Tennis Tour – Casablanca II

Damir Džumhur was the defending champion but lost in the second round to Gianluca Mager.

Maxime Janvier won the title after defeating Stefanos Tsitsipas 6–4, 6–0 in the final.

== Seeds ==
1. (Bosnia and Herzegovina) Damir Džumhur (second round, retired)
2. (Austria) Gerald Melzer (first round)
3. (Spain) Daniel Gimeno-Traver (withdrew)
4. (Slovakia) Andrej Martin (second round)
5. (Spain) Roberto Carballés Baena (second round)
6. (Belgium) Arthur De Greef (semifinals)
7. (Serbia) Laslo Đere (quarterfinals)
8. (Serbia) Peđa Krstin (first round)

== Draw ==
Key

- Q = Qualifier
- WC = Wild card
- LL = Lucky loser
- Alt = Alternate
- ITF = ITF entry
- PR = Protected ranking
- SR = Special ranking
- SE = Special exempt
- JE = Junior exempt
- JR = Junior Accelerator Programme entrant
- CO = College Accelerator Programme entrant
- NG = Next Gen Accelerator Program entrant
- w/o = Walkover
- r = Retired
- d = Defaulted

=== Finals ===
Semifinals
(Poland) Kamil Majchrzak	6	6^{1}	4
SE	(Greece) Stefanos Tsitsipas	4	7^{7}	6
6	(Belgium) Arthur De Greef	4	3
Q	(France) Maxime Janvier	6	6

Final
SE	(Greece) Stefanos Tsitsipas	4	0
Q	(France) Maxime Janvier	6	6

=== Top half ===
First round
1	(Bosnia and Herzegovina) D Džumhur	6	6
(Russia) A Karatsev	2	4
Q	(Italy) G Mager	6	1
(Egypt) M Safwat	4	0^{r}
(Romania) A Ungur	5	3
(Poland) K Majchrzak	7	6
(Czech Republic) Robin Staněk	6	3	6
8	(Serbia) P Krstin	3	6	3
4/WC	(Slovakia) A Martin	7	6
(Spain) J Samper-Montaña	5	1
WC	(Morocco) Reda Karakhi	2	4
SE	(Greece) S Tsitsipas	6	6
Q	(Spain) C Taberner	6	3	2
(Czech Republic) V Šafránek	4	6	6
(Germany) Jeremy Jahn	5	2
7	(Serbia) L Đere	7	6

Second round
1	(Bosnia and Herzegovina) D Džumhur	4	0^{r}
Q	(Italy) G Mager	6	4
(Poland) K Majchrzak	6	6
(Czech Republic) R Staněk	4	2
4/WC	(Slovakia) A Martin	3	6	4
SE	(Greece) S Tsitsipas	6	4	6
(Czech Republic) V Šafránek	3	4
7	(Serbia) L Đere	6	6

Quarterfinals
Q	(Italy) G Mager	4	5
(Poland) K Majchrzak	6	7
SE	(Greece) S Tsitsipas	2	7	7
7	(Serbia) L Đere	6	5	5

Semifinals
(Poland) K Majchrzak	6	6^{1}	4
SE	(Greece) S Tsitsipas	4	7^{7}	6

=== Bottom half ===
First round
6	(Belgium) A De Greef	6	6
(Germany) Marc Sieber	3	4
WC	(Morocco) Khalid Allouch	1	0
(Belarus) U Ignatik	6	6
(Belgium) Y Reuter	6	1	3
(Spain) A Menéndez-Maceiras	4	6	6
(Belgium) Clément Geens	2	6	2
LL	(Spain) B Zapata Miralles	6	4	6
5	(Spain) R Carballés Baena	7^{7}	6
(Italy) L Giustino	6^{1}	1
WC	(Morocco) A Ahouda	2	0
Q	(Serbia) D Petrović	6	6
Q	(France) M Janvier	6	7^{7}
(Kazakhstan) D Popko	3	6^{5}
(Austria) D Novak	7^{7}	6
2	(Austria) G Melzer	6^{4}	4

Second round
6	(Belgium) A De Greef	6	7^{7}
(Belarus) U Ignatik	3	6^{2}
(Spain) A Menéndez-Maceiras	2	5
LL	(Spain) B Zapata Miralles	6	7
5	(Spain) R Carballés Baena	5	4
Q	(Serbia) D Petrović	7	6
Q	(France) M Janvier	6	6
(Austria) D Novak	4	2

Quarterfinals
6	(Belgium) A De Greef	7^{7}	6
LL	(Spain) B Zapata Miralles	6^{3}	3
Q	(Serbia) D Petrović	3	7^{7}	2
Q	(France) M Janvier	6	6^{4}	6

Semifinals
6	(Belgium) A De Greef	4	3
Q	(France) M Janvier	6	6
