= 2009 Concurso Internacional de Tenis – Vigo – Doubles =

Vigo – Doubles
- 2009 Concurso Internacional de Tenis – Vigo

Final
- Champions: (Netherlands) Thiemo de Bakker; (Netherlands) Raemon Sluiter
- Runners-up: (Spain) Pedro Clar Rosselló; (Spain) Albert Ramos Viñolas
- Score: 7–5, 6–2

Events
Singles	Doubles
← 2008 ·	Concurso Internacional de Tenis – Vigo	· 2010 →

Alessandro Motti and Marco Crugnola were the defending champions, but they did not start in this tournament.
Thiemo de Bakker and Raemon Sluiter defeated Pedro Clar Rosselló and Albert Ramos Viñolas in the final 7–5, 6–2.

== Seeds ==
1. (Spain) David Marrero / (Spain) Rubén Ramírez Hidalgo (semifinals)
2. (Spain) Pablo Andújar / (Spain) Santiago Ventura (semifinals, withdrew)
3. (Argentina) Martín Alund / (Spain) Miguel Ángel López Jaén (quarterfinals)
4. (Italy) Andrea Arnaboldi / (Italy) Alberto Brizzi (first round)

== Draw ==
=== Key ===
- Q = Qualifier
- WC = Wild card
- LL = Lucky loser
- Alt = Alternate
- SE = Special exempt
- PR = Protected ranking
- ITF = ITF entry
- JE = Junior exempt
- w/o = Walkover
- r = Retired
- d = Defaulted
- SR = Special ranking

=== Draw ===
First round

Quarterfinals

Semifinals

Finals

1
- (Spain) D Marrero
- (Spain) R Ramírez Hidalgo
6
6

WC
- (Spain) I Coll-Riudavets
- (Spain) J Martí
4
2

1
- (Spain) D Marrero
- (Spain) R Ramírez Hidalgo
6
6

- (Netherlands) M Koning
- (Belgium) Y Mertens
6
6

- (Netherlands) M Koning
- (Belgium) Y Mertens
2
4

(Portugal) Joao Carvalho
(Angola) Nicolau Monteiro
1
1

1
- (Spain) D Marrero
- (Spain) R Ramírez Hidalgo
6^{4}
3

3
- (Argentina) M Alund
- (Spain) MÁ López Jaén
6
6

- (Netherlands) T de Bakker
- (Netherlands) R Sluiter
7
6

- (France) Jeremy Blandin
- (Poland) A Chadaj
2
4

3
- (Argentina) M Alund
- (Spain) MÁ López Jaén
1
3

- (Spain) R Bautista Agut
- (Spain) J Checa Calvo
2
4

- (Netherlands) T de Bakker
- (Netherlands) R Sluiter
6
6

- (Netherlands) T de Bakker
- (Netherlands) R Sluiter
6
6

- (Netherlands) T de Bakker
- (Netherlands) R Sluiter
7
6

- (Spain) P Clar Rosselló
- (Spain) A Ramos Viñolas
6
6

- (Spain) P Clar Rosselló
- (Spain) A Ramos Viñolas
6^{5}
2

WC
(United States) G Hill
(Spain) Emilio Viuda-Hernández
2
3

- (Spain) P Clar Rosselló
- (Spain) A Ramos Viñolas
6
1
[11]

(Spain) I Cervantes Huegun
(Spain) J Genaro-Martínez
6^{6}
7
[11]

(Spain) I Cervantes Huegun
(Spain) J Genaro-Martínez
2
6
[9]

4
- (Italy) Andrea Arnaboldi
- (Italy) A Brizzi
7
5
[9]

- (Spain) P Clar Rosselló
- (Spain) A Ramos Viñolas

- (France) R Jouan
- (France) M Rodrigues
6
6

2
- (Spain) P Andújar
- (Spain) S Ventura
w/o

WC
(Spain) Andres Gallego-Arostegui
(Spain) Pablo Ricardo Rodeiro
2
0

- (France) R Jouan
- (France) M Rodrigues
2
4

(Spain) I Navarro
(Spain) Israel Sevilla
5
4

2
- (Spain) P Andújar
- (Spain) S Ventura
6
6

2
- (Spain) P Andújar
- (Spain) S Ventura
7
6
