= 2012 Campeonato Internacional de Tênis do Estado do Pará – Singles =

Singles
- 2012 Campeonato Internacional de Tênis do Estado do Pará

Final
- Champion: (Brazil) Ricardo Hocevar
- Runner-up: (Netherlands) Thiemo de Bakker
- Score: 7–6^{(7–1)}, 7–6^{(7–4)}

Events
| Singles | Doubles |
| ← 2011 · | Campeonato Internacional de Tênis do Estado do Pará | · 2013 → |

Ricardo Hocevar won the title, defeating Thiemo de Bakker 7–6^{(7–1)}, 7–6^{(7–4)} in the final.

== Seeds ==
1. (Brazil) Thiago Alves (first round)
2. (Brazil) Rogério Dutra da Silva (semifinals)
3. (Brazil) Ricardo Mello (first round)
4. (Netherlands) Thiemo de Bakker (final)
5. (Portugal) Gastão Elias (second round)
6. (Brazil) Leonardo Kirche (quarterfinals)
7. (Argentina) Agustín Velotti (quarterfinals)
8. (Australia) John-Patrick Smith (second round)

== Draw ==
=== Key ===
- Q = Qualifier
- WC = Wild card
- LL = Lucky loser
- Alt = Alternate
- SE = Special exempt
- PR = Protected ranking
- ITF = ITF entry
- JE = Junior exempt
- w/o = Walkover
- r = Retired
- d = Defaulted
- SR = Special ranking

=== Finals ===
Semifinals
(Brazil) Guilherme Clezar | 3 | 4
(Brazil) Ricardo Hocevar | 6 | 6
4 | (Netherlands) Thiemo de Bakker | 6 | 7^{7}
2 | (Brazil) Rogério Dutra da Silva | 1 | 6^{0}

Final
(Brazil) Ricardo Hocevar | 7^{7} | 7^{7}
4 | (Netherlands) Thiemo de Bakker | 6^{1} | 6^{4}

=== Top half ===
First round
1 | (Brazil) T Alves | 4 | 4
(Brazil) G Clezar | 6 | 6
(Austria) N Moser | 3 | 3
WC | (Brazil) JP Sorgi | 6 | 6
(Brazil) A Ghem | 2 | 7^{7} | 7
WC | (Brazil) F Neis | 6 | 6^{1} | 5
WC | (Brazil) N Santos | 3 | 2
6 | (Brazil) L Kirche | 6 | 6
3 | (Brazil) R Mello | 5 | 2
(Brazil) R Hocevar | 7 | 6
(Brazil) T Turini | 7 | 7^{7}
(Brazil) J Silva | 5 | 6^{5}
(Brazil) Tiago Lopes | 6^{4} | 3
(Chile) J Aguilar | 7^{7} | 6
Q | (Romania) C-I Gârd | 2 | 6 | 1
8 | (Australia) J-P Smith | 6 | 3 | 6

Second round
(Brazil) G Clezar | 6 | 6
WC | (Brazil) JP Sorgi | 2 | 3
(Brazil) A Ghem | 6 | 4 | 4
6 | (Brazil) L Kirche | 2 | 6 | 6
(Brazil) R Hocevar | 6 | 6
(Brazil) T Turini | 3 | 3
(Chile) J Aguilar | 7^{7} | 6
8 | (Australia) J-P Smith | 6^{4} | 1

Quarterfinals
(Brazil) G Clezar | 6 | 6
6 | (Brazil) L Kirche | 3 | 4
(Brazil) R Hocevar | 6 | 6
(Chile) J Aguilar | 3 | 2

Semifinals
(Brazil) G Clezar | 3 | 4
(Brazil) R Hocevar | 6 | 6

=== Bottom half ===
First round
7 | (Argentina) A Velotti | 6 | 4 | 6
(Netherlands) T Schoorel | 3 | 6 | 3
Q | (Australia) J Peers | 7^{7} | 6^{4} | 4
(Chile) H Podlipnik | 6^{5} | 7^{7} | 6
(Brazil) T Monteiro | 7^{7} | 6
Q | (New Zealand) M Daniell | 6^{5} | 3
Q | (United States) N Monroe | 6 | 1 | 1
4 | (Netherlands) T de Bakker | 3 | 6 | 6
5 | (Portugal) G Elias | 6 | 6
LL | (Mexico) M Sánchez | 2 | 2
(Brazil) F de Paula | 5 | 6 | 4
WC | (Brazil) J Pereira | 7 | 4 | 6
(Brazil) A Miele | 5 | 4
(Brazil) B Sant'anna | 7 | 6
(Uruguay) M Felder | 4 | 4
2 | (Brazil) R Dutra da Silva | 6 | 6

Second round
7 | (Argentina) A Velotti | 6 | 6
(Chile) H Podlipnik | 4 | 1
(Brazil) T Monteiro | 6 | 6^{2} | 3
4 | (Netherlands) T de Bakker | 3 | 7^{7} | 6
5 | (Portugal) G Elias | 3 | 3
WC | (Brazil) J Pereira | 6 | 6
(Brazil) B Sant'Anna | 0 | 2
2 | (Brazil) R Dutra da Silva | 6 | 6

Quarterfinals
7 | (Argentina) A Velotti | 4 | 4
4 | (Netherlands) T de Bakker | 6 | 6
WC | (Brazil) J Pereira | 1 | 6 | 3
2 | (Brazil) R Dutra da Silva | 6 | 4 | 6

Semifinals
4 | (Netherlands) T de Bakker | 6 | 7^{7}
2 | (Brazil) R Dutra da Silva | 1 | 6^{0}
