= 2015 Morocco Tennis Tour – Casablanca II – Doubles =

Casablanca II – Doubles
- 2015 Morocco Tennis Tour – Casablanca II

Final
- Champions: (Lithuania) Laurynas Grigelis (Egypt) Mohamed Safwat
- Runners-up: (Netherlands) Thiemo de Bakker (Netherlands) Stephan Fransen
- Score: 6–4, 6–3

Events
Singles	Doubles
- Morocco Tennis Tour – Casablanca II

This was the first edition of the tournament, Laurynas Grigelis and Mohamed Safwat won the title defeating Thiemo de Bakker and Stephan Fransen in the final 6–4, 6–3.

== Seeds ==
1. (Italy) Alessandro Motti / (Romania) Adrian Ungur (semifinals)
2. (Poland) Tomasz Bednarek / (Poland) Mateusz Kowalczyk (quarterfinals)
3. (Spain) Íñigo Cervantes / (Netherlands) Mark Vervoort (first round)
4. (Serbia) Ilija Vucic / (Serbia) Miljan Zekić (quarterfinals)

== Draw ==
Key

- Q = Qualifier
- WC = Wild card
- LL = Lucky loser
- Alt = Alternate
- ITF = ITF entry
- PR = Protected ranking
- SR = Special ranking
- SE = Special exempt
- JE = Junior exempt
- JR = Junior Accelerator Programme entrant
- CO = College Accelerator Programme entrant
- NG = Next Gen Accelerator Program entrant
- w/o = Walkover
- r = Retired
- d = Defaulted

First round
(France) M Bourgue (France) M Hamou	6	2	[10]
WC	(Morocco) A Ahouda (Morocco) Y Idmbarek	4	6	[7]
3	(Spain) Í Cervantes (Netherlands) M Vervoort	6^{3}	6^{5}
(Morocco) L Ouahab (Spain) O Roca Batalla	7^{7}	7^{7}
(Bosnia and Herzegovina) D Džumhur (Serbia) D Petrović	4	6^{6}
(Netherlands) T de Bakker (Netherlands) S Fransen	6	7^{8}
(Lithuania) L Grigelis (Egypt) M Safwat	6	6
(Poland) M Gawron (Poland) G Panfil	2	2
WC	(Morocco) H Khaddari (Morocco) Y Rachidi	5	3
4	(Serbia) Ilija Vucic (Serbia) M Zekić	7	6
(Slovakia) J Kovalík (Greece) S Tsitsipas	7	6
WC	(Morocco) M Jdi (Morocco) M Saber	5	2

Quarterfinals
1	(Italy) A Motti (Romania) A Ungur	6	6
(France) M Bourgue (France) M Hamou	0	1
(Morocco) L Ouahab (Spain) O Roca Batalla	6	3	[5]
(Netherlands) T de Bakker (Netherlands) S Fransen	3	6	[10]
(Lithuania) L Grigelis (Egypt) M Safwat	7^{7}	6
4	(Serbia) I Vucic (Serbia) M Zekić	6^{5}	3
(Slovakia) J Kovalík (Greece) S Tsitsipas	6	7^{7}
2	(Poland) T Bednarek (Poland) M Kowalczyk	4	6^{4}

Semifinals
1	(Italy) A Motti (Romania) A Ungur	6^{7}	5
(Netherlands) T de Bakker (Netherlands) S Fransen	7^{9}	7
(Lithuania) L Grigelis (Egypt) M Safwat	6	3	[10]
(Slovakia) J Kovalík (Greece) S Tsitsipas	3	6	[6]

Final
(Netherlands) T de Bakker (Netherlands) S Fransen	4	3
(Lithuania) L Grigelis (Egypt) M Safwat	6	6
