= 2009 Concurso Internacional de Tenis – Vigo – Singles =

Vigo – Singles
- 2009 Concurso Internacional de Tenis – Vigo

Final
- Champion: (Netherlands) Thiemo de Bakker
- Runner-up: (France) Thierry Ascione
- Score: 6–4, 4–6, 6–2

Events
Singles	Doubles
← 2008 ·	Concurso Internacional de Tenis – Vigo	· 2010 →

Pablo Andújar tried to defend his 2008 title, but he was eliminated by Thiemo de Bakker in the semifinal.
de Bakker won in the final 6–4, 4–6, 6–2, against Thierry Ascione.

== Seeds ==
1. (Spain) Marcel Granollers (quarterfinals)
2. (Spain) Rubén Ramírez Hidalgo (quarterfinals)
3. (Spain) Iván Navarro (quarterfinals)
4. (Spain) Santiago Ventura (quarterfinals)
5. (Spain) Pablo Andújar (semifinals)
6. (Spain) Pere Riba (first round)
7. (Netherlands) Thiemo de Bakker (champion)
8. (Spain) David Marrero (second round)

== Draw ==
=== Key ===
- Q = Qualifier
- WC = Wild card
- LL = Lucky loser
- Alt = Alternate
- SE = Special exempt
- PR = Protected ranking
- ITF = ITF entry
- JE = Junior exempt
- w/o = Walkover
- r = Retired
- d = Defaulted
- SR = Special ranking

=== Final four ===
Semifinals
5	(Spain) Pablo Andújar	6	1	2
7	(Netherlands) Thiemo de Bakker	2	6	6
(France) Thierry Ascione	6	6
(Argentina) Martín Alund	4	3

Final
7	(Netherlands) Thiemo de Bakker	6	4	6
(France) Thierry Ascione	4	6	2

=== Top half ===
First round
1	(Spain) M Granollers	7	6
Q	(Spain) A Ramos-Viñolas	5	2
(Argentina) J-M Aranguren	5	0
(Belgium) Y Mertens	7	6
(Italy) A Brizzi	7	4	3
Q	(France) M Rodrigues	5	6	6
(Italy) A Arnaboldi	4	4
5	(Spain) P Andújar	6	6
3	(Spain) I Navarro	6	6
(Spain) R Bautista-Agut	4	2
Q	(Poland) A Chadaj	6	6
WC	(Spain) P Lijo Santos	1	1
(Spain) P Clar-Rosselló	5	4
(Spain) P Santos	7	6
(Netherlands) M Koning	1	1
7	(Netherlands) T de Bakker	6	6

Second round
1	(Spain) M Granollers	6	6
(Belgium) Y Mertens	3	4
Q	(France) M Rodrigues	1	3
5	(Spain) P Andújar	6	6
3	(Spain) I Navarro	6	6
Q	(Poland) A Chadaj	3	3
(Spain) P Santos	4	2
7	(Netherlands) T de Bakker	6	6

Quarterfinals
1	(Spain) M Granollers	2	7	3
5	(Spain) P Andújar	6	6^{6}	6
3	(Spain) I Navarro	5	1
7	(Netherlands) T de Bakker	7	6

Semifinals
5	(Spain) P Andújar	6	1	1
7	(Netherlands) T de Bakker	2	6	6

=== Bottom half ===
First round
8	(Spain) D Marrero	6	7
(Spain) J Checa-Calvo	3	5
(France) T Ascione	6	6
WC	(United States) G Hill	0	0
WC	(Spain) I Coll-Riudavets	3	4
(Spain) I Cervantes-Huegun	6	6
WC	(Russia) A Peskov	0	0
4	(Spain) S Ventura	6	6
6	(Spain) P Riba	2	5
(Argentina) M Alund	6	7
(France) R Jouan	6	7
(Spain) MÁ López Jaén	3	6^{4}
(Netherlands) R Sluiter	6	7
(Germany) A Flock	3	6^{2}
(Brazil) A Ghem	2	3
2	(Spain) R Ramírez Hidalgo	6	6

Second round
8	(Spain) D Marrero	5	6^{12}
(France) T Ascione	7	7
(Spain) I Cervantes-Huegun	2	6^{5}
4	(Spain) S Ventura	6	7
(Argentina) M Alund	5	7	6
(France) R Jouan	7	6^{1}	1
(Netherlands) R Sluiter	4	3
2	(Spain) R Ramírez Hidalgo	6	6

Quarterfinals
(France) T Ascione	6	6
4	(Spain) S Ventura	3	4
(Argentina) M Alund	6	6
2	(Spain) R Ramírez Hidalgo	3	3

Semifinals
(France) T Ascione	6	6
(Argentina) M Alund	4	3
