= 2016 Morocco Tennis Tour – Casablanca II – Doubles =

Casablanca II – Doubles
- 2016 Morocco Tennis Tour – Casablanca II

Final
- Champions: (Czech Republic) Roman Jebavý (Slovakia) Andrej Martin
- Runners-up: (Croatia) Dino Marcan (Croatia) Antonio Šančić
- Score: 6–4, 6–2

Events
Singles	Doubles
- Morocco Tennis Tour – Casablanca II

Laurynas Grigelis and Mohamed Safwat were the defending champions but chose not to defend their title.

Roman Jebavý and Andrej Martin won the title after defeating Dino Marcan and Antonio Šančić 6–4, 6–2 in the final.

== Seeds ==
1. (Czech Republic) Roman Jebavý / (Slovakia) Andrej Martin (champions)
2. (Croatia) Dino Marcan / (Croatia) Antonio Šančić (final)
3. (Poland) Tomasz Bednarek / (Australia) Rameez Junaid (first round)
4. (Italy) Riccardo Ghedin / (Italy) Alessandro Motti (semifinals)

== Draw ==
Key

- Q = Qualifier
- WC = Wild card
- LL = Lucky loser
- Alt = Alternate
- ITF = ITF entry
- PR = Protected ranking
- SR = Special ranking
- SE = Special exempt
- JE = Junior exempt
- JR = Junior Accelerator Programme entrant
- CO = College Accelerator Programme entrant
- NG = Next Gen Accelerator Program entrant
- w/o = Walkover
- r = Retired
- d = Defaulted

First round
(Croatia) M Draganja (Croatia) T Draganja	6^{4}	6	[10]
(Switzerland) L Margaroli (Netherlands) M Vervoort	7^{7}	2	[6]
3	(Poland) T Bednarek (Australia) R Junaid	3	7^{7}	[6]
(Bosnia and Herzegovina) D Džumhur (Serbia) D Petrović	6	6^{2}	[10]
(Belgium) Clément Geens (Czech Republic) V Šafránek	7	6
WC	(Morocco) Reda Karakhi (Morocco) M Saber	5	2
(Spain) A Menéndez-Maceiras (Greece) S Tsitsipas	3	6	[10]
(Russia) A Karatsev (Kazakhstan) D Popko	6	3	[7]
WC	(Morocco) Khalid Allouch (Morocco) M Jdi	6	3	[2]
4	(Italy) R Ghedin (Italy) A Motti	3	6	[10]
WC	(Morocco) A Ahouda (Morocco) Ayoub Chakrouni
(Czech Republic) I Minář (Czech Republic) Robin Staněk	w/o
(Belgium) A De Greef (Belgium) Y Reuter	4	3
2	(Croatia) D Marcan (Croatia) A Šančić	6	6

Quarterfinals
1	(Czech Republic) R Jebavý (Slovakia) A Martin	7	4	[10]
(Croatia) M Draganja (Croatia) T Draganja	5	6	[8]
(Bosnia and Herzegovina) D Džumhur (Serbia) D Petrović	6	6^{1}	[10]
(Belgium) C Geens (Czech Republic) V Šafránek	4	7^{7}	[7]
(Spain) A Menéndez-Maceiras (Greece) S Tsitsipas	7^{7}	3	[4]
4	(Italy) R Ghedin (Italy) A Motti	6^{4}	6	[10]
(Czech Republic) I Minář (Czech Republic) R Staněk	4	6	[7]
2	(Croatia) D Marcan (Croatia) A Šančić	6	3	[10]

Semifinals
1	(Czech Republic) R Jebavý (Slovakia) A Martin	6	6
(Bosnia and Herzegovina) D Džumhur (Serbia) D Petrović	3	2
4	(Italy) R Ghedin (Italy) A Motti	1	7^{12}	[3]
2	(Croatia) D Marcan (Croatia) A Šančić	6	6^{10}	[10]

Final
1	(Czech Republic) R Jebavý (Slovakia) A Martin	6	6
2	(Croatia) D Marcan (Croatia) A Šančić	4	2
