= 2012 Campeonato Internacional de Tênis do Estado do Pará =

- Date: 1–7 October
- Edition: 1st
- Surface: Hard
- Location: Belém, Brazil

Champions

Singles
- (Brazil) Ricardo Hocevar

Doubles
- (Australia) John Peers / (Australia) John-Patrick Smith
Campeonato Internacional de Tênis do Estado do Pará	· 2013 →

The 2012 Campeonato Internacional de Tênis do Estado do Pará was a professional tennis tournament played on hard courts. It was the first edition of the tournament which was part of the 2012 ATP Challenger Tour. It took place in Belém, Brazil between 1 and 7 October 2012.

== Singles main-draw entrants ==
=== Seeds ===
Country	Player	Rank^{1}	Seed
BRA	Thiago Alves	119	1
BRA	Rogério Dutra da Silva	127	2
BRA	Ricardo Mello	155	3
NED	Thiemo de Bakker	159	4
POR	Gastão Elias	176	5
BRA	Leonardo Kirche	214	6
ARG	Agustín Velotti	227	7
AUS	John-Patrick Smith	228	8

- ^{1} Rankings are as of September 24, 2012.

=== Other entrants ===
The following players received wildcards into the singles main draw:

- (Brazil) Fabrício Neis
- (Brazil) José Pereira
- (Brazil) Nicolas Santos
- (Brazil) João Pedro Sorgi

The following players received entry from the qualifying draw:

- (New Zealand) Marcus Daniell
- (Romania) Cătălin-Ionuț Gârd
- (United States) Nicholas Monroe
- (Australia) John Peers

== Champions ==
=== Singles ===
- (Brazil) Ricardo Hocevar def. (Netherlands) Thiemo de Bakker, 7–6^{(7–1)}, 7–6^{(7–4)}

=== Doubles ===
- (Australia) John Peers / (Australia) John-Patrick Smith def. (United States) Nicholas Monroe / (Germany) Simon Stadler, 6–3, 6–2
