= 2015 Morocco Tennis Tour – Casablanca II =

- Date: 12–17 October
- Edition: 1st
- Surface: Clay
- Location: Casablanca, Morocco

Champions

Singles
- (Bosnia and Herzegovina) Damir Džumhur

Doubles
- (Lithuania) Laurynas Grigelis / (Egypt) Mohamed Safwat
- Morocco Tennis Tour – Casablanca II

The 2015 Morocco Tennis Tour – Casablanca II was a professional tennis tournament played on clay courts. It was the first edition of the tournament which was part of the 2015 ATP Challenger Tour. It took place in Casablanca, Morocco between 12 and 17 October 2015.

== Singles main-draw entrants ==
=== Seeds ===
Country	Player	Rank^{1}	Seed
ITA	Paolo Lorenzi	83	1
ESP	Daniel Gimeno Traver	86	2
ESP	Daniel Muñoz de la Nava	88	3
BIH	Damir Džumhur	89	4
ESP	Íñigo Cervantes	103	5
ESP	Albert Montañés	116	6
JPN	Taro Daniel	125	7
ESP	Roberto Carballés Baena	141	8

- ^{1} Rankings are as of October 5, 2015.

=== Other entrants ===
The following players received wildcards into the singles main draw:

- (Morocco) Yassine Idmbarek
- (Morocco) Hicham Khaddari
- (Morocco) Amine Ahouda
- (Morocco) Younès Rachidi

The following player received entry using a special exemption:

- (Poland) Kamil Majchrzak

The following player received entry into the singles main draw using a protected ranking:

- (Spain) Javier Martí

The following players received entry from the qualifying draw:

- (Serbia) Laslo Đere
- (Serbia) Danilo Petrović
- (France) Maxime Hamou
- (Poland) Marcin Gawron

== Champions ==
=== Singles ===
- (Bosnia and Herzegovina) Damir Džumhur def. (Spain) Daniel Muñoz de la Nava, 3–6, 6–3, 6–2.

=== Doubles ===
- (Lithuania) Laurynas Grigelis / (Egypt) Mohamed Safwat def. (Netherlands) Thiemo de Bakker / (Netherlands) Stephan Fransen, 6–4, 6–3.
