= Morocco Tennis Tour =

Morocco Tennis Tour may refer to one of eight Moroccan professional tennis tournaments, all part of the ATP Challenger Tour:

- Morocco Tennis Tour – Casablanca, held annually since 2011
- Morocco Tennis Tour – Casablanca II, held annually since 2015
- Morocco Tennis Tour – Kenitra, held annually since 2013
- Morocco Tennis Tour – Marrakech, held annually since 2007
- Morocco Tennis Tour – Meknes, held annually since 2008
- Morocco Tennis Tour – Mohammedia, held annually since 2014
- Morocco Tennis Tour – Rabat, held annually since 2007
- Morocco Tennis Tour – Tanger, held annually since 2008
