= 2009 Concurso Internacional de Tenis – Vigo =

- Date: August 10 – August 16
- Edition: 5th
- Location: Vigo, Spain

Champions

Singles
- (Netherlands) Thiemo de Bakker

Doubles
- (Netherlands) Thiemo de Bakker / (Netherlands) Raemon Sluiter
← 2008 ·	Concurso Internacional de Tenis – Vigo	· 2010 →

The 2009 Concurso Internacional de Tenis – Vigo was a professional tennis tournament played on outdoor red clay courts. It was part of the 2009 ATP Challenger Tour. It took place in Vigo, Spain between 10 and 16 August 2009.

== Singles entrants ==
=== Seeds ===
Nationality	Player	Ranking*	Seeding
ESP	Marcel Granollers	98	1
ESP	Rubén Ramírez Hidalgo	99	2
ESP	Iván Navarro	112	3
ESP	Santiago Ventura	113	4
ESP	Pablo Andújar	124	5
ESP	Pere Riba	157	6
NED	Thiemo de Bakker	208	7
ESP	David Marrero	216	8

- Rankings are as of August 3, 2009.

=== Other entrants ===
The following players received wildcards into the singles main draw:

- (Spain) Ignacio Coll Riudavets
- (United States) Gregg Hill
- (Spain) Pablo Lijo Santos
- (Russia) Anton Peskov

The following players received entry from the qualifying draw:

- (Poland) Adam Chadaj
- (Spain) Pedro Clar Rosselló
- (Spain) Albert Ramos Viñolas
- (France) Mathieu Rodrigues

== Champions ==
=== Singles ===
(Netherlands) Thiemo de Bakker def. (France) Thierry Ascione, 6–4, 4–6, 6–2

=== Doubles ===
(Netherlands) Thiemo de Bakker / (Netherlands) Raemon Sluiter def. (Spain) Pedro Clar Rosselló / (Spain) Albert Ramos Viñolas, 7–5, 6–2
