= 2012 Campeonato Internacional de Tênis do Estado do Pará – Doubles =

Doubles
- 2012 Campeonato Internacional de Tênis do Estado do Pará

Final
- Champions: (Australia) John Peers (Australia) John-Patrick Smith
- Runners-up: (United States) Nicholas Monroe (Germany) Simon Stadler
- Score: 6–3, 6–2

Events
Singles	Doubles
← 2011 ·	Campeonato Internacional de Tênis do Estado do Pará	· 2013 →

John Peers and John-Patrick Smith won the final by defeating Nicholas Monroe and Simon Stadler 6–3, 6–2 in the final.

== Seeds ==
1. (United States) Nicholas Monroe / (Germany) Simon Stadler (final)
2. (Australia) John Peers / (Australia) John-Patrick Smith (champion)
3. (Brazil) Rogério Dutra da Silva / (Uruguay) Marcel Felder (semifinals)
4. (Brazil) Guilherme Clezar / (Brazil) André Ghem (semifinals)

== Draw ==
=== Key ===
- Q = Qualifier
- WC = Wild card
- LL = Lucky loser
- Alt = Alternate
- SE = Special exempt
- PR = Protected ranking
- ITF = ITF entry
- JE = Junior exempt
- w/o = Walkover
- r = Retired
- d = Defaulted
- SR = Special ranking

=== Draw ===
First round
1	(United States) N Monroe (Germany) S Stadler	6	6
(Uruguay) A Behar (Argentina) A Velotti	4	2
WC	(Brazil) Victor Maynard (Brazil) Jaime Oncins	3	2
(Brazil) A Miele (Brazil) T Turini	6	6
4	(Brazil) G Clezar (Brazil) A Ghem	5	7^{7}	[10]
(Brazil) R Hocevar (Brazil) L Kirche	7	6^{5}	[5]
(Brazil) F de Paula (Brazil) F Neis	4	6	[10]
(Brazil) Thiago Monteiro (Brazil) Bruno Sant'anna	6	3	[5]
(Chile) J Aguilar (Brazil) Diego Matos	w/o
(Romania) C-I Gârd (Chile) H Podlipnik
WC	(Brazil) Tiago Lopes (Brazil) J Pereira	1	1
3	(Brazil) R Dutra da Silva (Uruguay) M Felder	6	6
(Brazil) N Santos (Brazil) JP Sorgi	5	5
(New Zealand) M Daniell (United States) V Mirzadeh	7	7
WC	(Brazil) Marcos Vinicius Dias (Brazil) Alexandre Tsuchiya	1	1
2	(Australia) J Peers (Australia) J-P Smith	6	6

Quarterfinals
1	(United States) N Monroe (Germany) S Stadler	6	6
(Brazil) A Miele (Brazil) T Turini	4	4
4	(Brazil) G Clezar (Brazil) A Ghem	7^{7}	6
(Brazil) F de Paula (Brazil) F Neis	6^{5}	4
(Chile) J Aguilar (Brazil) Diego Matos	4	4
3	(Brazil) R Dutra da Silva (Uruguay) M Felder	6	6
(New Zealand) M Daniell (United States) V Mirzadeh	1	1
2	(Australia) J Peers (Australia) J-P Smith	6	6

Semifinals
1	(United States) N Monroe (Germany) S Stadler	7	4	[10]
4	(Brazil) G Clezar (Brazil) A Ghem	5	6	[6]
3	(Brazil) R Dutra da Silva (Uruguay) M Felder	6^{3}	5
2	(Australia) J Peers (Australia) J-P Smith	7^{7}	7

Final
1	(United States) N Monroe (Germany) S Stadler	3	2
2	(Australia) J Peers (Australia) J-P Smith	6	6
