= 2016 Morocco Tennis Tour – Casablanca II =

- Date: 10–15 October
- Edition: 2nd
- Surface: Clay
- Location: Casablanca, Morocco

Champions

Singles
- (France) Maxime Janvier

Doubles
- (Czech Republic) Roman Jebavý / (Slovakia) Andrej Martin
- Morocco Tennis Tour – Casablanca II

The 2016 Morocco Tennis Tour – Casablanca II was a professional tennis tournament played on clay courts. It was the second edition of the tournament which was part of the 2016 ATP Challenger Tour. It took place in Casablanca, Morocco, between 10 and 15 October 2016.

== Singles main-draw entrants ==
=== Seeds ===
Country	Player	Rank^{1}	Seed
BIH	Damir Džumhur	77	1
AUT	Gerald Melzer	87	2
ESP	~~Daniel Gimeno Traver~~	~~116~~	~~3~~
SVK	Andrej Martin	121	4
ESP	Roberto Carballés Baena	126	5
BEL	Arthur De Greef	138	6
SRB	Laslo Đere	174	7
SRB	Peđa Krstin	193	8

- ^{1} Rankings are as of October 3, 2016.

=== Other entrants ===
The following players received wildcards into the singles main draw:

- (Slovakia) Andrej Martin
- (Morocco) Reda Karakhi
- (Morocco) Amine Ahouda
- (Morocco) Khalid Allouch

The following player received entry using a special exemption:

- (Greece) Stefanos Tsitsipas

The following players received entry from the qualifying draw:

- (Italy) Gianluca Mager
- (Spain) Carlos Taberner
- (France) Maxime Janvier
- (Serbia) Danilo Petrović

The following player entered as a lucky loser:

- (Spain) Bernabé Zapata Miralles

== Champions ==
=== Singles ===
- (France) Maxime Janvier def. (Greece) Stefanos Tsitsipas, 6–4, 6–0.

=== Doubles ===
- (Czech Republic) Roman Jebavý / (Slovakia) Andrej Martin def. (Croatia) Dino Marcan / (Croatia) Antonio Šančić, 6–4, 6–2.
