= Campeonato Internacional de Tênis do Estado do Pará =

2012 tennis tournament in Belém, Brazil

ATP Challenger Tour
- Location: Belém, Brazil
- Category: ATP Challenger Tour
- Surface: Hard
- Draw: 32S/16Q/16D
- Prize money: US$35,000+H
- Website: Website

The Campeonato Internacional de Tênis do Estado do Pará was a tennis tournament held in Belém, Brazil, in 2012. The event was part of the ATP Challenger Tour and was played on hardcourts.

== Past finals ==
=== Singles ===
Year	Champion	Runner-up	Score
2012	(Brazil) Ricardo Hocevar	(Netherlands) Thiemo de Bakker	7–6^{(7–1)}, 7–6^{(7–4)}

=== Doubles ===
Year	Champions	Runners-up	Score
2012	(Australia) John Peers (Australia) John-Patrick Smith	(United States) Nicholas Monroe (Germany) Simon Stadler	6–3, 6–2
