= Concurso Internacional de Tenis – Vigo =

ATP Challenger Tour
- Location: Vigo; Spain
- Venue: Club de Campo de Vigo
- Category: ITF Men's Circuit
- Surface: Red clay / Outdoors
- Draw: 32S/30Q/16D
- Prize money: $15,000

The Concurso Internacional de Tenis – Vigo (formerly Cidade de Vigo) was a tennis tournament held in Vigo, Spain. It was played on outdoor red clay courts. Between 2005 and 2009, the event was part of the ATP Challenger Tour. In 2010, the tournament became part of the ITF Men's Circuit.

== Past finals ==
=== Singles ===
| Year | Champion | Runner-up | Score | Ref. |
|---|---|---|---|---|
| 2009 | (Netherlands) Thiemo de Bakker | (France) Thierry Ascione | 6–4, 4–6, 6–2 | |
| 2008 | (Spain) Pablo Andújar | (Italy) Marco Crugnola | 6–1, 3–6, 6–3 | |
| 2007 | (Argentina) Máximo González | (Spain) Marc López | 6–2, 6–4 | |
| 2006 | (Spain) Pablo Andújar | (Spain) Fernando Vicente | 7–5, 7–6(6) | |
| 2005 | (Spain) Albert Portas | (Spain) Iván Navarro | 6–4, 6–4 | |

=== Doubles ===
| Year | Champions | Runners-up | Score |
|---|---|---|---|
| 2009 | (Netherlands) Thiemo de Bakker (Netherlands) Raemon Sluiter | (Spain) Pedro Clar Rosselló (Spain) Albert Ramos Viñolas | 7–5, 6–2 |
| 2008 | (Italy) Alessandro Motti (Italy) Marco Crugnola | (Spain) Pedro Clar Rosselló (Spain) Pablo Martín-Adalia | 6–3, 4–6, [10–4] |
| 2007 | (Italy) Leonardo Azzaro (Algeria) Lamine Ouahab | (Spain) Pablo Santos (Netherlands) Igor Sijsling | 2–6, 6–4, [10–7] |
| 2006 | (Spain) Pablo Andújar (Spain) Marcel Granollers | (France) Augustin Gensse (Argentina) Horacio Zeballos | 7–6(4), 6–1 |
| 2005 | (Germany) Lars Uebel (Czech Republic) Jan Vacek | (Spain) Guillem Burniol (Spain) José Antonio Sánchez de Luna | 6–4, 6–3 |
