= Thiemo de Bakker =

Dutch tennis player (born 1988)

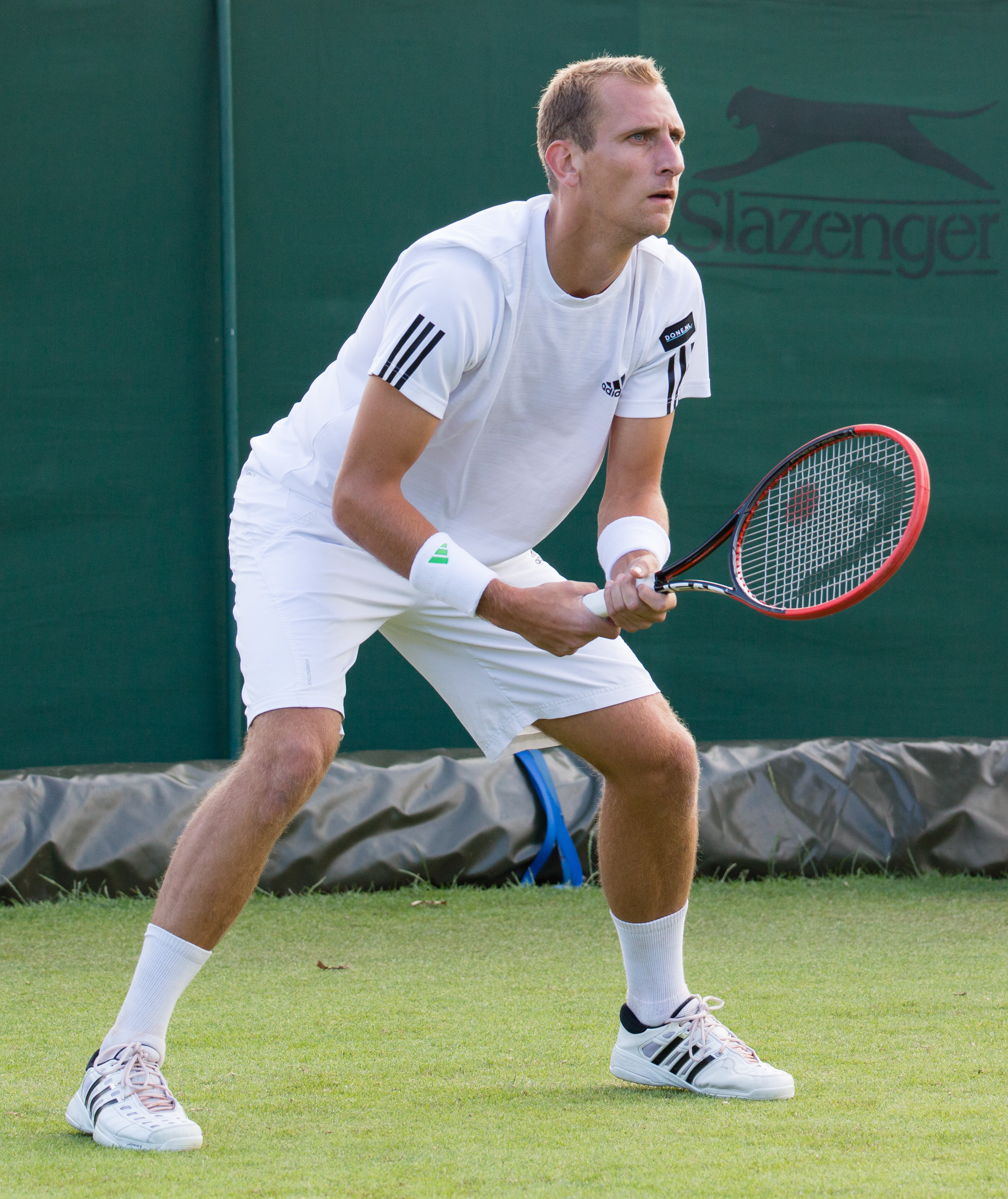
- Thiemo de Bakker at the 2015 Wimbledon Qualifying
- Country (sports): Netherlands
- Residence: 's-Gravenzande, Netherlands
- Born: 19 September 1988 (age 37) The Hague, Netherlands
- Height: 1.93 m (6 ft 4 in)
- Turned pro: 2006
- Retired: Nov 2024 (Oct 2023 last match played)
- Plays: Right-handed (two-handed backhand)
- Coach: Remko de Rijke and Huib Troost
- Prize money: $ 1,841,293

Singles
- Career record: 70–94
- Career titles: 0
- Highest ranking: No. 40 (19 July 2010)

Grand Slam singles results
- Australian Open: 1R (2010, 2011, 2016)
- French Open: 3R (2010)
- Wimbledon: 3R (2010)
- US Open: 3R (2010)

Doubles
- Career record: 18–29
- Career titles: 0
- Highest ranking: No. 115 (10 February 2014)
- Last updated on: 24 November 2024.

Thiemo Carsten Jannick de Bakker (Dutch pronunciation: [ˈtimoː də ˈbɑkər]; born 19 September 1988) is a Dutch tennis coach and a former professional player. He has an ATP career-high ranking in singles of World No. 40 achieved on 19 July 2010.

== Career ==
Considered a top prospect of his generation as a junior, he also made an impressive breakthrough as a young pro, reaching a career-high ranking in July 2010, before his career became largely marked by injuries, inconsistencies and a decline in his performances which coincided with the death of his father in 2011.

=== Junior career ===
De Bakker finished 2006 as the ITF Junior Champion, after having won the Boys' Singles title at the 2006 Wimbledon Championships.

=== Early career ===
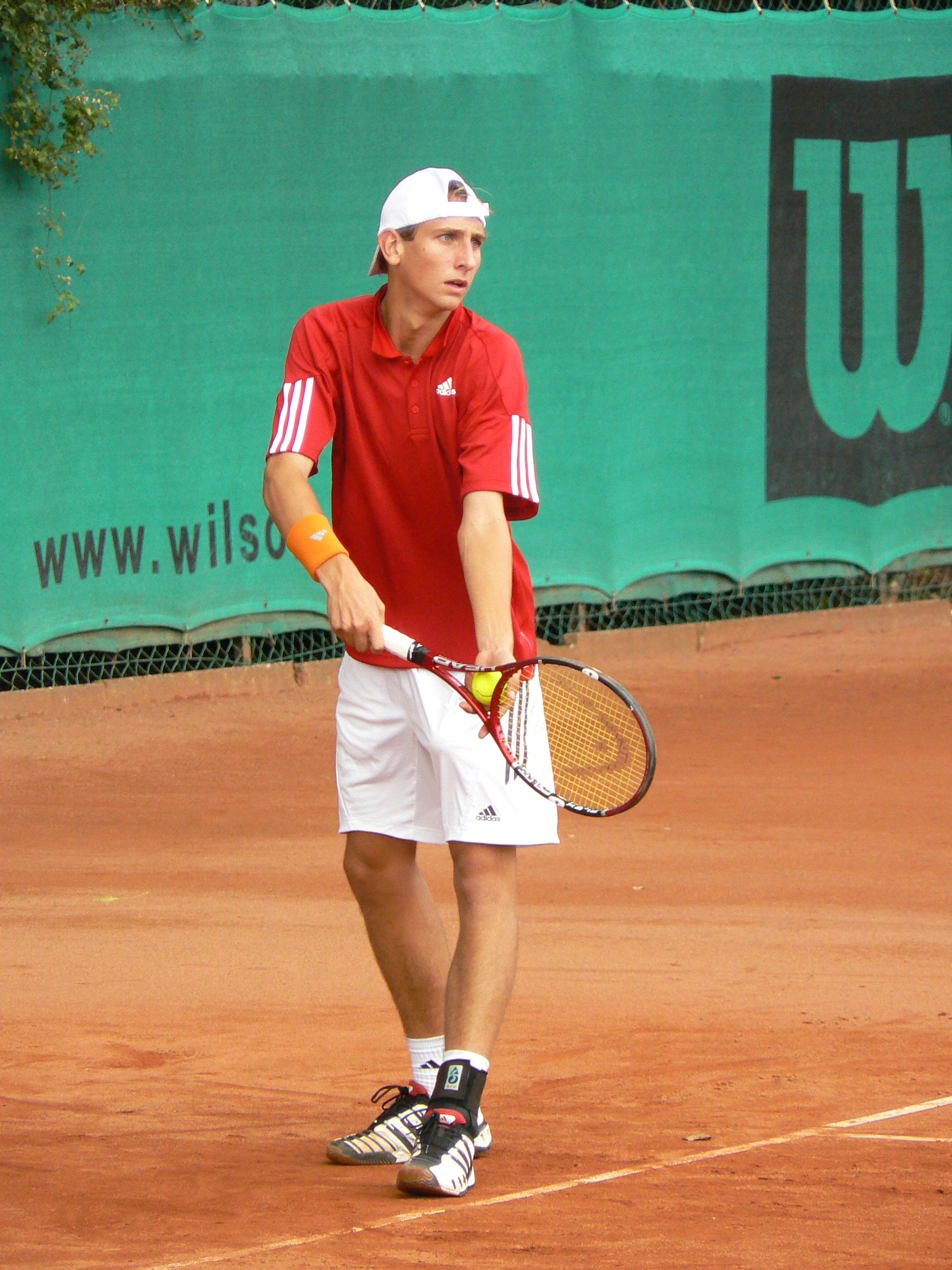
Serving during the Ricoh NTK 2006 in Amsterdam

De Bakker received a wildcard into the ATP Amersfoort event in July 2006 and defeated top 100 and French Open Quarterfinalist Julien Benneteau in the 1st round, winning in straight sets 6–3, 6–3. In the second round he faced Frenchman Marc Gicquel and lost in three sets. As he was the reigning Junior Champion, De Bakker received a wildcard into the main draw of the 2007 Wimbledon Championships, where he would lose in five tight sets to qualifier Wayne Arthurs.

In October 2006, De Bakker won his first senior international title in a Futures event in Albufeira, Portugal, where he beat Briton Morgan Phillips in the final. This was followed by another win in a Futures tournament two weeks later in San Miguel, Portugal. He reached a career high ATP ranking of 228 on 25 August 2008.

=== 2009 ===
On 22 March 2009, he finished as runner-up in the Caltanissetta Challenger tournament to compatriot Jesse Huta Galung, losing in straight sets. On 5 May 2009, as a qualifier and ranked 236, he defeated the 5th seed Rainer Schüttler in the first round of the BMW Open in Münich in straight sets, before losing to former world number one, Lleyton Hewitt. De Bakker would follow this up in the 2009 Ordina Open, by qualifying for the tournament and losing in the second round to Rainer Schüttler, after defeating Björn Phau in three tight sets. De Bakker hit a rich vein of form in August, winning four Challenger tournaments, and bumping his ranking from 256 to 122, in the span of one month. His form continued in Davis Cup competition, by beating World Number 13 Gaël Monfils in 4 sets, and putting the Netherlands up 1–0 on France, but lost to Jo-Wilfried Tsonga in four tight sets. De Bakker would finish the year ranked 96th.

=== 2010 ===
De Bakker started 2010 in much the same way he finished 2009. He reached the quarter-finals of the 2010 Aircel Chennai Open, after defeating the eighth seed, Rajeev Ram, and compatriot Robin Haase, he lost to Janko Tipsarević. This would boost his ranking to number 81 in the world, and gave him a high enough ranking to receive direct entrance into the 2010 Australian Open men's singles. In his first Grand Slam in three years, the Dutchman was paired up against the 6th seed Andy Roddick. After losing the first set, de Bakker lost the second and third set by one break each.

De Bakker's next tournament was his first ever Masters event, the 2010 BNP Paribas Open in Indian Wells. He started off winning his opening match against Marcos Daniel in straight sets, before advancing to the third round after beating 30th seed Janko Tipsarević where he retired just after five games of play at 3–2 first set. In the third round, he fell to eventual finalist Andy Roddick. De Bakker played his second Masters event two weeks later the 2010 Sony Ericsson Open, winning his first round match against Rajeev Ram in straight sets, before falling again to the eventual finalist, this time Tomáš Berdych with the same scoreline as in Indian Wells.

De Bakker's next Masters event was the 2010 Monte-Carlo Rolex Masters, where he had to qualify this time. After defeating Eduardo Schwank, de Bakker lost to the five-time reigning champion, and world number two, Rafael Nadal. De Bakker lost this match in less than an hour, winning one game in a two sets loss. He then appeared at the 2010 Barcelona Open Banco Sabadell. He took out World No.58 Alejandro Falla, followed by a victory over world No.92 Daniel Gimeno-Traver. In the round of 16, he scored a win over World No.16 (and former World #1) Juan Carlos Ferrero. Before the match, Ferrero had an 18–2 record on clay for the year. He followed it up with his best career victory, with a superb performance to take out World No.10 Jo-Wilfried Tsonga, his first win over a top 10 player. However, his run came to an end against World No.8 Robin Söderling in the semifinals. Thiemo rose to a career high World No.50 as a result of his semifinal appearance there.

Following his performance at Barcelona, de Bakker received a Special Exempt to enter the main draw of Rome Masters where he faced Viktor Troicki in the first round, but retired due to a groin injury. At the 2010 French Open, he made a third round showing where he lost to an injured Jo-Wilfried Tsonga in four sets.

At the 2010 Wimbledon Championships, de Bakker advanced to the third round of the men's singles tournament after defeating Colombian Santiago Giraldo in a hotly contested five sets win, followed by a more comprehensive defeat of an exhausted John Isner, the winner of the longest tennis match in history, which finished on its third day of play on 24 June, 6–0, 6–3, 6–2. This made Bakker the first, and one of only two players in history to bagel Isner (the other being Jannik Sinner in 2021), before losing in the third round to Paul-Henri Mathieu of France. De Bakker also participated in the men's doubles tournament, in which his partner was his Dutch colleague Haase. After defeating Viktor Troicki and Christopher Kas in the first round, they lost to the Ratiwatana twins, who entered the main tournament as lucky losers, in 4 sets. As a result, he reached the top 40 in singles on 19 July 2010.

At the 2010 Pilot Pen Tennis, Thiemo reached his second ATP semi-final. Sergiy Stakhovsky defeated him in two sets.

=== 2013: Maiden ATP doubles final ===
He reached his maiden doubles final at the Rotterdam Open with Jesse Huta Galung where he lost to Nenad Zimonjić and Robert Lindstedt.

=== 2024: United Cup debut, retirement, start coaching career ===
In October 2023, he was selected as the No. 2 ATP player at the 2024 United Cup as part of the Netherlands team. In November 2024, de Bakker announced his retirement from professional tennis and started coaching Jesper de Jong.

== ATP career finals ==
=== Doubles: 1 (1 runner-up) ===
Legend Grand Slam tournaments (0–0) ATP World Tour Finals (0–0) ATP World Tour Masters 1000 (0–0) ATP World Tour 500 Series (0–1) ATP World Tour 250 Series (0–0)	Finals by surface Hard (0–1) Clay (0–0) Grass (0–0)	Finals by setting Outdoor (0–0) Indoor (0–1)

Result	W–L	Date	Tournament	Tier	Surface	Partner	Opponents	Score
Loss	0–1	Feb 2013	Rotterdam Open, Netherlands	500 Series	Hard (i)	(Netherlands) Jesse Huta Galung	(Sweden) Robert Lindstedt (Serbia) Nenad Zimonjić	7–5, 3–6, [8–10]

== Challenger and Futures finals ==
=== Singles: 34 (24–10) ===
Legend (singles) ATP Challenger Tour (11–5) ITF Futures Tour (13–5)	Titles by surface Hard (5–3) Clay (19–7)

Result	W–L	Date	Tournament	Tier	Surface	Opponent	Score
Win	1–0	Oct 2006	Portugal F4, Albufeira	Futures	Hard	(United Kingdom) Morgan Phillips	7–6^{(7–5)}, 6–4
Win	2–0	Oct 2006	Portugal F6, Ponta Delgada	Futures	Hard	(Spain) David Cañudas-Fernández	6–2, 6–4
Loss	2–1	Nov 2006	Israel F4, Ramat HaSharon	Futures	Hard	(Austria) Andreas Haider-Maurer	4–6, 4–6
Loss	2–2	Sep 2007	Netherlands F5, Enschede	Futures	Clay	(Netherlands) Nick van der Meer	7–6^{(8–6)}, 6–7^{(3–7)}, 2–6
Loss	2–3	Mar 2008	Portugal F5, Lagos	Futures	Hard	(Portugal) Rui Machado	4–6, 3–6
Win	3–3	Jun 2008	Netherlands F1, Apeldoorn	Futures	Clay	(France) Stéphane Robert	7–6^{(7–2)}, 6–1
Win	4–3	Jun 2008	Netherlands F2, Alkmaar	Futures	Clay	(Netherlands) Melle van Gemerden	4–6, 6–1, 6–2
Loss	4–4	Mar 2009	Caltanissetta, Italy	Challenger	Clay	(Netherlands) Jesse Huta Galung	2–6, 3–6
Win	5–4	Aug 2009	Tampere, Finland	Challenger	Clay	(Australia) Peter Luczak	6–4, 7–6^{(9–7)}
Win	6–4	Aug 2009	Vigo, Spain	Challenger	Clay	(France) Thierry Ascione	6–4, 4–6, 6–2
Win	7–4	Aug 2009	San Sebastián, Spain	Challenger	Clay	(Serbia) Filip Krajinović	6–2, 6–3
Win	8–4	Sep 2009	Braşov, Romania	Challenger	Clay	(Spain) Pere Riba	7–5, 6–0
Loss	8–5	May 2012	Spain F13, Getxo	Futures	Clay	(Italy) Andrea Arnaboldi	6–3, 6–7^{(4–7)}, 4–6
Win	9–5	Jun 2012	Netherlands F1, Zuidwolde	Futures	Clay	(Netherlands) Nick van der Meer	6–4, 4–6, 6–3
Win	10–5	Jun 2012	Netherlands F2, Alkmaar	Futures	Clay	(Austria) Gerald Melzer	6–4, 7–5
Loss	10–6	Jul 2012	Netherlands F3, Breda	Futures	Clay	(China) Zhang Ze	4–6, 6–3, 4–6
Win	11–6	Jul 2012	Bercuit, Belgium	Challenger	Clay	(Romania) Victor Hănescu	6–4, 3–6, 7–5
Win	12–6	Sep 2012	Alphen, Netherlands	Challenger	Clay	(Germany) Simon Greul	6–4, 6–2
Loss	12–7	Oct 2012	Belém, Brazil	Challenger	Hard	(Brazil) Ricardo Hocevar	6–7^{(1–7)}, 6–7^{(4–7)}
Win	13–7	Oct 2012	San Juan, Argentina	Challenger	Clay	(Argentina) Martín Alund	6–2, 3–6, 6–2
Loss	13–8	Mar 2013	Santiago, Chile	Challenger	Clay	(Argentina) Facundo Bagnis	6–7^{(2–7)}, 6–7^{(3–7)}
Win	14–8	Apr 2014	Santiago, Chile	Challenger	Clay	(Australia) James Duckworth	4–6, 7–6^{(12–10)}, 6–1
Loss	14–9	Jun 2014	Marburg, Germany	Challenger	Clay	(Argentina) Horacio Zeballos	6–3, 3–6, 3–6
Loss	14–10	May 2015	Bordeaux, France	Challenger	Clay	(Australia) Thanasi Kokkinakis	4–6, 6–1, 6–7^{(5–7)}
Win	15–10	Oct 2015	Las Vegas, USA	Challenger	Hard	(Slovenia) Grega Žemlja	3–6, 6–3, 6–1
Win	16–10	Oct 2015	Monterrey, Mexico	Challenger	Hard	(Dominican Republic) Víctor Estrella Burgos	7–6^{(7–1)}, 4–6, 6–3
Win	17–10	Jun 2017	Netherlands F1, Alkmaar	Futures	Clay	(France) Maxime Chazal	6–3, 7–5
Win	18–10	Jul 2017	Netherlands F3, Middelburg	Futures	Clay	(Netherlands) Botic van de Zandschulp	6–3, 6–4
Win	19–10	Aug 2017	Netherlands F6, Rotterdam	Futures	Clay	(Netherlands) Gijs Brouwer	6–2, 6–3
Win	20–10	Oct 2017	Egypt F29, Sharm El Sheikh	Futures	Hard	(Netherlands) Gijs Brouwer	6–3, 7–6^{(7–3)}
Win	21–10	Mar 2018	Italy F2, Santa Margherita di Pula	Futures	Clay	(Hungary) Attila Balázs	6–2, 5–7, 6–1
Win	22–10	Jul 2018	Scheveningen, Netherlands	Challenger	Clay	(Germany) Yannick Maden	6–2, 6–1
Win	23–10	Sep 2019	M25 Santa Margherita di Pula, Italy	World Tennis Tour	Clay	(Germany) Lucas Gerch	6–2, 6–4
Win	24–10	Aug 2023	M15 Huy, Belgium	World Tennis Tour	Clay	(Netherlands) Sidané Pontjodikromo	6–3, 6–3

=== Doubles: 18 (13–5) ===
Legend (doubles) ATP Challenger Tour (6–2) ITF Futures Tour (7–3)	Titles by surface Hard (4–0) Clay (9–5) Grass (0–0) Carpet (0–0)

Result	W–L	Date	Tournament	Tier	Surface	Partner	Opponents	Score
Win	1–0	Sep 2006	Netherlands F7, Almere	Futures	Clay	(Netherlands) Antal van der Duim	(Netherlands) Jesse Huta Galung (Netherlands) Igor Sijsling	4–6, 6–1, 6–4
Loss	1–1	May 2007	Great Britain F10, Edinburgh	Futures	Clay	(Canada) Pierre-Ludovic Duclos	(France) Olivier Charroin (France) Ludwig Pellerin	4–6, 6–1, 2–6
Loss	1–2	May 2007	Italy F15, Parma	Futures	Clay	(Netherlands) Igor Sijsling	(Italy) Alberto Brizzi (Italy) Giancarlo Petrazzuolo	6–1, 4–6, 3–6
Win	2–2	Aug 2007	Netherlands F4, Vlaardingen	Futures	Clay	(Netherlands) Igor Sijsling	(Netherlands) Danny Spierenburg (Netherlands) Serinho Wijdenbosch	6–4, 7–6^{(8–6)}
Win	3–2	Aug 2009	Vigo, Spain	Challenger	Clay	(Netherlands) Raemon Sluiter	(Spain) Pedro Clar-Rosselló (Spain) Albert Ramos	7–5, 6–2
Win	4–2	Sep 2011	Alphen, Netherlands	Challenger	Clay	(Netherlands) Antal van der Duim	(Netherlands) Matwé Middelkoop (Netherlands) Igor Sijsling	6–4, 6–7^{(4–7)}, [10–6]
Win	5–2	Jun 2012	Netherlands F1, Zuidwolde	Futures	Clay	(Netherlands) Antal van der Duim	(Sweden) Patrik Rosenholm (Sweden) Michael Ryderstedt	6–4, 6–0
Win	6–2	Aug 2013	Rio de Janeiro, Brazil	Challenger	Clay	(Brazil) André Sá	(Brazil) Marcelo Demoliner (Brazil) João Souza	6–3, 6–2
Win	7–2	May 2015	Bordeaux, France	Challenger	Clay	(Netherlands) Robin Haase	(France) Lucas Pouille (Ukraine) Sergiy Stakhovsky	6–3, 7–5
Loss	7–3	Oct 2015	Casablanca, Morocco	Challenger	Clay	(Netherlands) Stephan Fransen	(Lithuania) Laurynas Grigelis (Egypt) Mohamed Safwat	4–6, 3–6
Win	8–3	Oct 2015	Monterrey, Mexico	Challenger	Hard	(Netherlands) Mark Vervoort	(Italy) Paolo Lorenzi (Brazil) Fernando Romboli	w/o
Win	9–3	Jan 2018	Egypt F1, Sharm El Sheikh	Futures	Hard	(Belgium) Yannick Mertens	(Italy) Roberto Marcora (Ukraine) Artem Smirnov	7–5, 6–2
Win	10–3	Jan 2018	Egypt F2, Sharm El Sheikh	Futures	Hard	(Netherlands) Michiel de Krom	(Tunisia) Moez Echargui (Tunisia) Anis Ghorbel	6–3, 6–4
Win	11–3	Apr 2019	Sophia Antipolis, France	Challenger	Clay	(Netherlands) Robin Haase	(France) Enzo Couacaud (France) Tristan Lamasine	6–4, 6–4
Loss	11–4	May 2019	Ostrava, Czech Republic	Challenger	Clay	(Netherlands) Tallon Griekspoor	(Switzerland) Luca Margaroli (Slovakia) Filip Polášek	4–6, 6–2, [8–10]
Win	12–4	Sep 2019	M25 Santa Margherita di Pula, Italy	World Tennis Tour	Clay	(France) Clement Tabur	(Italy) Jacopo Berrettini (Italy) Alessandro Petrone	2–6, 6–1, [10–7]
Loss	12–5	Mar 2023	M25 Palma Nova, Spain	World Tennis Tour	Clay	(Netherlands) Mats Hermans	(Italy) Stefano Travaglia (Italy) Alexander Weis	5–7, 3–6
Win	13–5	Jun 2023	M15 Jakarta, Indonesia	World Tennis Tour	Hard	(Indonesia) Justin Barki	(India) Siddhant Banthia (India) Nitin Kumar Sinha	6–4, 6–3

== Singles performance timeline ==
Key
W	F	SF	QF	#R	RR	Q#	P#	DNQ	A	Z#	PO	G	S	B	NMS	NTI	P	NH

(W) winner; (F) finalist; (SF) semifinalist; (QF) quarterfinalist; (#R) rounds 4, 3, 2, 1; (RR) round-robin stage; (Q#) qualification round; (P#) preliminary round; (DNQ) did not qualify; (A) absent; (Z#) Davis/Fed Cup Zonal Group (with number indication) or (PO) play-off; (G) gold, (S) silver or (B) bronze Olympic/Paralympic medal; (NMS) not a Masters tournament; (NTI) not a Tier I tournament; (P) postponed; (NH) not held; (SR) strike rate (events won / competed); (W–L) win–loss record.
To avoid confusion and double counting, these charts are updated at the conclusion of a tournament or when the player's participation has ended.

Current till 2018 Rotterdam Open.

Tournament	2006	2007	2008	2009	2010	2011	2012	2013	2014	2015	2016	2017	2018	2019	SR	W–L
Grand Slam tournaments
Australian Open	A	A	A	A	1R	1R	Q3	Q2	Q3	Q2	1R	A	A	A	0 / 3	0–3
French Open	A	A	A	Q2	3R	1R	A	1R	Q1	Q2	1R	A	A	Q2	0 / 4	2–4
Wimbledon	A	1R	A	A	3R	A	A	1R	A	Q2	Q1	A	A	Q1	0 / 3	2–3
US Open	A	A	A	A	3R	1R	Q1	1R	Q1	Q1	Q2	A	Q1	A	0 / 3	2–3
Win–loss	0–0	0–1	0–0	0–0	6–4	0–3	0–0	0–3	0–0	0–0	0–2	0–0	0–0	0–0	0 / 13	6–13
ATP World Tour Masters 1000
Indian Wells Masters	A	A	A	A	3R	1R	A	A	Q1	1R	2R	A	A	0 / 4	3–4	
Miami Open	A	A	A	A	2R	A	A	1R	3R	Q2	A	A	A	0 / 3	3–3	
Monte-Carlo Masters	A	A	A	A	2R	A	A	Q2	A	Q2	Q1	A	A	0 / 1	1–1	
Madrid Open	A	A	A	A	A	2R	A	A	A	A	A	A	A	0 / 1	1–1	
Italian Open	A	A	A	A	1R	1R	A	Q1	A	A	A	A	A	0 / 2	0–2	
Canadian Open	A	A	A	A	2R	A	A	A	A	A	A	A	A	0 / 1	1–1	
Cincinnati Masters	A	A	A	A	2R	A	A	A	A	A	A	A	A	0 / 1	1–1	
Shanghai Masters	Not Held			A	2R	A	A	A	A	A	A	A	A	0 / 1	1–1	
Paris Masters	A	A	A	A	1R	A	A	A	A	A	A	A	A	0 / 1	0–1	
Win–loss	0–0	0–0	0–0	0–0	7–8	1–3	0–0	0–1	2–1	0–1	1–1	0–0	0–0	0 / 15	11–15	
National representation
Summer Olympics	NH		A	Not Held			A	Not Held			A	NH		0 / 0	0–0	
Davis Cup	A	A	PO	1R	Z1	Z1	PO	PO	1R	PO	Z1	PO	1R	0 / 2	16–13	
Win–loss	0–0	0–0	3–1	1–3	2–1	1–0	3–1	2–0	0–2	1–2	1–1	1–2	1–0	0 / 2	16–13	
Career statistics
Titles / Finals	0 / 0	0 / 0	0 / 0	0 / 0	0 / 0	0 / 0	0 / 0	0 / 0	0 / 0	0 / 0	0 / 0	0 / 0	0 / 0	0 / 0		
Overall win–loss	1–1	1–4	4–2	3–6	28–24	3–11	3–3	10–10	6–8	3–7	6–13	1–2	1–1	70–92		
Year-end ranking	464	444	249	96	43	223	124	146	144	99	257	372	242	43%		

== Wins over top 10 players ==
#	Player	Rank	Event	Surface	Rd	Score	TdB Rank
2010
1.	(France) Jo-Wilfried Tsonga	10	Barcelona, Spain	Clay	QF	6–4, 3–6, 6–3	67
2.	(Spain) Fernando Verdasco	9	Shanghai, China	Hard	1R	7–6^{(7–4)}, 7–5	47
2013
3.	(Czech Republic) Tomáš Berdych	6	Båstad, Sweden	Clay	QF	7–5, 7–5	104

Awards
Preceded by (United States) Donald Young	ITF Junior World Champion; 2006	Succeeded by (Lithuania) Ričardas Berankis
