= Morocco Tennis Tour – Casablanca II =

- 2016 Morocco Tennis Tour – Casablanca II

ATP Challenger Tour
- Event name: Morocco Tennis Tour – Casablanca II
- Location: Casablanca, Morocco
- Venue: Racing Universitaire de Casablanca
- Category: ATP Challenger Tour
- Surface: Clay
- Draw: 32S/32Q/16D
- Prize money: €42,500

The Morocco Tennis Tour – Casablanca II was a professional tennis tournament played on clay courts. It was part of the Association of Tennis Professionals (ATP) Challenger Tour. It was held annually in Casablanca, Morocco since 2015.

== Past finals ==
=== Singles ===
Year	Champion	Runner-up	Score
2016	(France) Maxime Janvier	(Greece) Stefanos Tsitsipas	6–4, 6–0
2015	(Bosnia and Herzegovina) Damir Džumhur	(Spain) Daniel Muñoz de la Nava	3–6, 6–3, 6–2

=== Doubles ===
Year	Champions	Runners-up	Score
2016	(Czech Republic) Roman Jebavý (Slovakia) Andrej Martin	(Croatia) Dino Marcan (Croatia) Antonio Šančić	6–4, 6–2
2015	(Lithuania) Laurynas Grigelis (Egypt) Mohamed Safwat	(Netherlands) Thiemo de Bakker (Netherlands) Stephan Fransen	6–4, 6–3
