= 2019 Murcia Open =

Professional tennis tournament

- Date: 8–14 April
- Edition: 1st
- Surface: Clay
- Location: Murcia, Spain

Champions

Singles
- (Spain) Roberto Carballés Baena

Doubles
- (New Zealand) Marcus Daniell / (Spain) David Marrero
- Murcia Open

The 2019 Murcia Open was a professional tennis tournament played on clay courts. It was the 1st edition of the tournament which was part of the 2019 ATP Challenger Tour. It took place in Murcia, Spain between 8 and 14 April 2019.

== Singles main-draw entrants ==
=== Seeds ===
Country	Player	Rank^{1}	Seed
POR	Pedro Sousa	103	1
ESP	Roberto Carballés Baena	110	2
BRA	Thiago Monteiro	112	3
CZE	Lukáš Rosol	132	4
ESP	Pedro Martínez	151	5
ITA	Salvatore Caruso	159	6
BEL	Ruben Bemelmans	164	7
BEL	Arthur De Greef	174	8
GER	Rudolf Molleker	182	9
ESP	Daniel Gimeno Traver	183	10
ARG	Facundo Argüello	188	11
ESP	Enrique López Pérez	189	12
BEL	Kimmer Coppejans	195	13
SWE	Mikael Ymer	196	14
NED	Tallon Griekspoor	206	15
ESP	Sergio Gutiérrez Ferrol	209	16

- ^{1} Rankings are as of 1 April 2019.

=== Other entrants ===
The following players received wildcards into the singles main draw:

- (Spain) Carlos Alcaraz
- (Spain) Nicolás Almagro
- (Russia) Ivan Gakhov
- (Spain) Gerard Granollers
- (Spain) Carlos López Montagud

The following player received entry into the singles main draw as a special exempt:

- (Spain) Pedro Martínez

The following player received entry into the singles main draw as an alternate:

- (Spain) Pere Riba

The following players received entry into the singles main draw using their ITF World Tennis Ranking:

- (Italy) Riccardo Bonadio
- (Italy) Raúl Brancaccio
- (Russia) Ivan Nedelko
- (Spain) David Pérez Sanz
- (Spain) Oriol Roca Batalla

The following players received entry from the qualifying draw:

- (Italy) Andrea Vavassori
- (Spain) David Vega Hernández

The following player received entry as a lucky loser:

- (Brazil) Fabrício Neis

== Champions ==
=== Singles ===
- (Spain) Roberto Carballés Baena def. (Sweden) Mikael Ymer 2–6, 6–0, 6–2.

=== Doubles ===
- (New Zealand) Marcus Daniell / (Spain) David Marrero def. (Australia) Rameez Junaid / (Belarus) Andrei Vasilevski 6–4, 6–4.
