= 2021 Murcia Open – Doubles =

Tennis tournament

Doubles
- 2021 Murcia Open

Final
- Champions: (Italy) Raúl Brancaccio (Spain) Flavio Cobolli
- Runners-up: (Spain) Alberto Barroso Campos (Spain) Roberto Carballés Baena
- Score: 6–3, 7–6^{(7–4)}

Events
Singles	Doubles
- Murcia Open

Marcus Daniell and David Marrero were the defending champions but chose not to defend their title.

Raúl Brancaccio and Flavio Cobolli won the title after defeating Alberto Barroso Campos and Roberto Carballés Baena 6–3, 7–6^{(7–4)} in the final.

== Seeds ==
1. (India) Sriram Balaji / (India) Ramkumar Ramanathan (semifinals)
2. (Netherlands) Jesper de Jong / (Netherlands) Bart Stevens (quarterfinals)
3. (Ukraine) Vladyslav Manafov / (Poland) Piotr Matuszewski (quarterfinals)
4. (Spain) Alberto Barroso Campos / (Spain) Roberto Carballés Baena (final)

== Draw ==
Key

- Q = Qualifier
- WC = Wild card
- LL = Lucky loser
- Alt = Alternate
- ITF = ITF entry
- PR = Protected ranking
- SR = Special ranking
- SE = Special exempt
- JE = Junior exempt
- JR = Junior Accelerator Programme entrant
- CO = College Accelerator Programme entrant
- NG = Next Gen Accelerator Program entrant
- w/o = Walkover
- r = Retired
- d = Defaulted

First round
(Italy) Davide Galoppini (Italy) F Passaro	7^{9}	5	[10]
WC	(Spain) Pablo Martínez Gómez (Spain) D Rincón	6^{7}	7	[4]
(Spain) R Ortega Olmedo (Spain) C Sánchez Jover	5	1
(France) C Denolly (France) M Martineau	7	6
(Italy) R Brancaccio (Italy) F Cobolli	6	7^{8}
PR	(India) A Chandrasekar (India) Manish Sureshkumar	2	6^{6}
(Argentina) A Collarini (Argentina) M Kestelboim	5	4
PR	(Belgium) J De Loore (Belgium) Jeroen Vanneste	7	6

Quarterfinals
1	(India) S Balaji (India) R Ramanathan	7^{7}	6
(Italy) D Galoppini (Italy) F Passaro	6^{5}	3
4	(Spain) A Barroso Campos (Spain) R Carballés Baena	6	7^{7}
(France) C Denolly (France) M Martineau	1	6^{2}
(Italy) R Brancaccio (Italy) F Cobolli	6	6
3	(Ukraine) V Manafov (Poland) P Matuszewski	4	4
PR	(Belgium) J De Loore (Belgium) J Vanneste	6	4	[10]
2	(Netherlands) J de Jong (Netherlands) B Stevens	4	6	[7]

Semifinals
1	(India) S Balaji (India) R Ramanathan	5	6^{6}
4	(Spain) A Barroso Campos (Spain) R Carballés Baena	7	7^{8}
(Italy) R Brancaccio (Italy) F Cobolli	7^{7}	7
PR	(Belgium) J De Loore (Belgium) J Vanneste	6^{4}	5

Final
4	(Spain) A Barroso Campos (Spain) R Carballés Baena	3	6^{4}
(Italy) R Brancaccio (Italy) F Cobolli	6	7^{7}
