= 2026 Murcia Open – Singles =

Singles
- 2026 Murcia Open

Final
- Champion: (Spain) Pablo Carreño Busta
- Runner-up: (Spain) Roberto Carballés Baena
- Score: 6–4, 6–3

Events
Singles	Doubles
- Murcia Open

Carlos Taberner was the defending champion but chose not to defend his title.

Pablo Carreño Busta won the title after defeating Roberto Carballés Baena 6–4, 6–3 in the final.

== Seeds ==
1. (Netherlands) Jesper de Jong (semifinals)
2. (Lithuania) Vilius Gaubas (first round)
3. (Spain) Pablo Carreño Busta (champion)
4. (Austria) Sebastian Ofner (quarterfinals)
5. (Denmark) Elmer Møller (first round)
6. (United Kingdom) Jan Choinski (second round)
7. (Italy) Andrea Pellegrino (quarterfinals)
8. (Spain) Roberto Carballés Baena (final)

== Draw ==
Key

- Q = Qualifier
- WC = Wild card
- LL = Lucky loser
- Alt = Alternate
- ITF = ITF entry
- PR = Protected ranking
- SR = Special ranking
- SE = Special exempt
- JE = Junior exempt
- JR = Junior Accelerator Programme entrant
- CO = College Accelerator Programme entrant
- NG = Next Gen Accelerator Program entrant
- w/o = Walkover
- r = Retired
- d = Defaulted

=== Finals ===
Semifinals
1	(Netherlands) Jesper de Jong	6	4	4
8	(Spain) Roberto Carballés Baena	2	6	6
3	(Spain) Pablo Carreño Busta	6	6
(Belgium) Kimmer Coppejans	2	3

Final
8	(Spain) Roberto Carballés Baena	4	3
3	(Spain) Pablo Carreño Busta	6	6

=== Top half ===
First round
1	(Netherlands) J de Jong	6	3	6
(Lebanon) B Hassan	3	6	3
Q	(Germany) L Wessels	2	2
(Netherlands) M Houkes	6	6
(Spain) P Llamas Ruiz	6	6
Q	(Spain) D Jordà Sanchis	1	2
(Spain) M Damas	6	4	4
6	(United Kingdom) J Choinski	4	6	6
4	(Austria) S Ofner	6	7^{7}
Q	(Portugal) F Ferreira Silva	2	6^{4}
WC	(Italy) R Brancaccio	7^{7}	6
WC	(Spain) A Sánchez Quílez	6^{4}	2
(Lithuania) E Butvilas	6^{4}	4
(Kazakhstan) M Kukushkin	7^{7}	6
(Spain) N Sánchez Izquierdo	3	6^{5}
8	(Spain) R Carballés Baena	6	7^{7}

Second round
1	(Netherlands) J de Jong	6	6
(Netherlands) M Houkes	1	3
(Spain) P Llamas Ruiz	6	6^{4}	6
6	(United Kingdom) J Choinski	2	7^{7}	3
4	(Austria) S Ofner	6	6
WC	(Italy) R Brancaccio	0	4
(Kazakhstan) M Kukushkin	1	6	2
8	(Spain) R Carballés Baena	6	3	6

Quarterfinals
1	(Netherlands) J de Jong	6	6
(Spain) P Llamas Ruiz	3	2
4	(Austria) S Ofner	6^{4}	6	1
8	(Spain) R Carballés Baena	7^{7}	2	6

Semifinals
1	(Netherlands) J de Jong	6	4	4
8	(Spain) R Carballés Baena	2	6	6

=== Bottom half ===
First round
7	(Italy) A Pellegrino	6	6
(Spain) P Martín Tiffon	4	4
(Germany) J Engel	6	3	7
Alt	(Jordan) A Shelbayh	3	6	5
Q	(United Kingdom) F Gill	6	3	7^{7}
Q	(Poland) F Pieczonka	3	6	6^{5}
Alt	(Spain) C Sánchez Jover	6^{3}	1
3	(Spain) P Carreño Busta	7^{7}	6
5	(Denmark) E Møller	4	1
(Belgium) K Coppejans	6	6
I Gakhov	1	2
Q	(Germany) C Negritu	6	6
(Belgium) GA Bailly	6	4	6
LL	(Georgia (country)) S Purtseladze	3	6	4
(Spain) A Moro Cañas	7^{7}	6
2	(Lithuania) V Gaubas	6^{2}	2

Second round
7	(Italy) A Pellegrino	3	6	7
(Germany) J Engel	6	2	5
Q	(United Kingdom) F Gill	6	3	2
3	(Spain) P Carreño Busta	4	6	6
(Belgium) K Coppejans	7	6
Q	(Germany) C Negritu	5	4
(Belgium) GA Bailly	7	6^{5}	6
(Spain) A Moro Cañas	5	7^{7}	2

Quarterfinals
7	(Italy) A Pellegrino	3	4
3	(Spain) P Carreño Busta	6	6
(Belgium) K Coppejans	6	3	6
(Belgium) GA Bailly	0	6	3

Semifinals
3	(Spain) P Carreño Busta	6	6
(Belgium) K Coppejans	2	3
