= 2016 San Luis Open Challenger Tour =

- Date: 21 – 27 March
- Edition: 23rd
- Draw: 32S / 16D
- Prize money: $50,000+H
- Surface: Clay
- Location: San Luis Potosí, Mexico

Champions

Singles
- (Serbia) Peđa Krstin

Doubles
- (New Zealand) Marcus Daniell / (New Zealand) Artem Sitak
- San Luis Open Challenger Tour

The 2016 San Luis Open Challenger Tour was a professional tennis tournament played on hard courts. It was the 23rd edition of the tournament which was part of the 2016 ATP Challenger Tour. It took place in San Luis Potosí, Mexico between 21 and 27 March.

== Singles main-draw entrants ==
=== Seeds ===
Country	Player	Rank^{1}	Seed
GER	Michael Berrer	112	1
ESP	Albert Montañés	133	2
BRA	André Ghem	154	3
ESP	Adrián Menéndez Maceiras	159	4
ITA	Matteo Donati	181	5
FRA	Mathias Bourgue	187	6
CHI	Hans Podlipnik	196	7
IRL	James McGee	203	8

- ^{1} Rankings are as of March 14, 2016.

=== Other entrants ===
The following players received wildcards into the singles main draw:

- (Mexico) Mauricio Astorga
- (Mexico) Lucas Gómez
- (Mexico) Manuel Sánchez
- (Mexico) Tigre Hank

The following player received entry as an alternate:

- (Colombia) Nicolás Barrientos

The following players received entry from the qualifying draw:

- (El Salvador) Marcelo Arévalo
- (Czech Republic) Robin Staněk
- (Argentina) Agustín Velotti
- (Brazil) Caio Zampieri

== Champions ==
=== Singles ===
- (Serbia) Peđa Krstin def. (El Salvador) Marcelo Arévalo, 6–4, 6–2

=== Doubles ===
- (New Zealand) Marcus Daniell / (New Zealand) Artem Sitak def. (Mexico) Santiago González / (Croatia) Mate Pavić, 6–3, 7–6^{(7–4)}
