= 2019 Murcia Open – Doubles =

Doubles
- 2019 Murcia Open

Final
- Champions: (New Zealand) Marcus Daniell (Spain) David Marrero
- Runners-up: (Australia) Rameez Junaid (Belarus) Andrei Vasilevski
- Score: 6–4, 6–4

Events
| Singles | Doubles |
- Murcia Open

This was the first edition of the tournament.

Marcus Daniell and David Marrero won the title after defeating Rameez Junaid and Andrei Vasilevski 6–4, 6–4 in the final.

== Seeds ==
1. (New Zealand) Marcus Daniell / (Spain) David Marrero (champions)
2. (Brazil) Fabrício Neis / (Spain) David Vega Hernández (semifinals)
3. (Uruguay) Ariel Behar / (Italy) Andrea Vavassori (semifinals)
4. (Australia) Rameez Junaid / (Belarus) Andrei Vasilevski (final)

== Draw ==
Key

- Q = Qualifier
- WC = Wild card
- LL = Lucky loser
- Alt = Alternate
- ITF = ITF entry
- PR = Protected ranking
- SR = Special ranking
- SE = Special exempt
- JE = Junior exempt
- JR = Junior Accelerator Programme entrant
- CO = College Accelerator Programme entrant
- NG = Next Gen Accelerator Program entrant
- w/o = Walkover
- r = Retired
- d = Defaulted

First round
1 | (New Zealand) M Daniell (Spain) D Marrero | 4 | 6 | [10]
WC | (Argentina) F Argüello (Argentina) P Cachin | 6 | 3 | [8]
(Brazil) T Bellucci (Argentina) G Durán | 6 | 4 | [10]
ITF | (Spain) D Pérez Sanz (Spain) O Roca Batalla | 4 | 6 | [6]
3 | (Uruguay) A Behar (Italy) A Vavassori | 6 | 6
WC | (Spain) N Almagro (Costa Rica) JA Marín | 1 | 3
(Belgium) K Coppejans (Czech Republic) L Rosol | 6 | 6
WC | (Spain) Carlos Boluda-Purkiss (Spain) S Gutiérrez Ferrol | 3 | 4
ITF | (Italy) R Brancaccio (Spain) S Martos Gornés | 6 | 6
(France) B Bonzi (Netherlands) M Vervoort | 1 | 4
(Spain) G Granollers (Spain) P Martínez | 7 | 2 | [4]
4 | (Australia) R Junaid (Belarus) A Vasilevski | 5 | 6 | [10]
(Finland) H Heliövaara (Venezuela) LD Martínez | 4 | 4
(Russia) I Gakhov (Spain) E López Pérez | 6 | 6
(Belgium) R Bemelmans (Belgium) A De Greef | 2 | 7 | [7]
2 | (Brazil) F Neis (Spain) D Vega Hernádez | 6 | 5 | [10]

Quarterfinals
1 | (New Zealand) M Daniell (Spain) D Marrero | 6^{4} | 6 | [10]
(Brazil) T Bellucci (Argentina) G Durán | 7^{7} | 2 | [7]
3 | (Uruguay) A Behar (Italy) A Vavassori | w/o
(Belgium) K Coppejans (Czech Republic) L Rosol
ITF | (Italy) R Brancaccio (Spain) S Martos Gornés | 3 | 3
4 | (Australia) R Junaid (Belarus) A Vasilevski | 6 | 6
(Russia) I Gakhov (Spain) E López Pérez | 4 | 1
2 | (Brazil) F Neis (Spain) D Vega Hernádez | 6 | 6

Semifinals
1 | (New Zealand) M Daniell (Spain) D Marrero | 4 | 6 | [10]
3 | (Uruguay) A Behar (Italy) A Vavassori | 6 | 3 | [2]
4 | (Australia) R Junaid (Belarus) A Vasilevski | 6 | 6^{3} | [10]
2 | (Brazil) F Neis (Spain) D Vega Hernádez | 3 | 7^{7} | [4]

Final
1 | (New Zealand) M Daniell (Spain) D Marrero | 6 | 6
4 | (Australia) R Junaid (Belarus) A Vasilevski | 4 | 4
