= 2017 Antonio Savoldi–Marco Cò – Trofeo Dimmidisì =

- Date: 21–27 August
- Edition: 16th
- Location: Manerbio, Italy

Champions

Singles
- (Spain) Roberto Carballés Baena

Doubles
- (Monaco) Romain Arneodo / (France) Hugo Nys
← 2016 ·	Antonio Savoldi–Marco Cò – Trofeo Dimmidisì	· 2019 →

The 2017 Antonio Savoldi–Marco Cò – Trofeo Dimmidisì was a professional tennis tournament played on clay courts. It was the sixteenth edition of the tournament which was part of the 2017 ATP Challenger Tour. It took place in Manerbio, Italy between 21 and 27 August 2017.

== Singles main-draw entrants ==
=== Seeds ===
Country	Player	Rank^{1}	Seed
ESP	Guillermo García López	136	1
CZE	Adam Pavlásek	138	2
ESP	Roberto Carballés Baena	141	3
BEL	Arthur De Greef	144	4
GER	Oscar Otte	146	5
FRA	Mathias Bourgue	152	6
ESP	Tommy Robredo	182	7
ESP	Ricardo Ojeda Lara	226	8

- ^{1} Rankings are as of 14 August 2017.

=== Other entrants ===
The following players received wildcards into the singles main draw:

- (Italy) Julian Ocleppo
- (Italy) Andrea Pellegrino
- (Italy) Gianluigi Quinzi
- (Italy) Andrea Vavassori

The following player received entry into the singles main draw as a special exempt:

- (Sweden) Elias Ymer

The following player received entry into the singles main draw as an alternate:

- (Serbia) Miljan Zekić

The following players received entry from the qualifying draw:

- (Italy) Federico Gaio
- (Italy) Gianluca Mager
- (Austria) Maximilian Neuchrist
- (Italy) Lorenzo Sonego

The following player received entry as a lucky loser:

- (Austria) Lenny Hampel

== Champions ==
=== Singles ===
- (Spain) Roberto Carballés Baena def. (Spain) Guillermo García López 6–4, 2–6, 6–2.

=== Doubles ===
- (Monaco) Romain Arneodo / (France) Hugo Nys def. (Russia) Mikhail Elgin / (Czech Republic) Roman Jebavý 4–6, 7–6^{(7–3)}, [10–5].
