= 2021 Murcia Open – Singles =

Tennis tournament

Singles
- 2021 Murcia Open

Final
- Champion: (Netherlands) Tallon Griekspoor
- Runner-up: (Spain) Roberto Carballés Baena
- Score: 3–6, 7–5, 6–3

Events
Singles	Doubles
- Murcia Open

Roberto Carballés Baena was the defending champion but lost in the final to Tallon Griekspoor.

Griekspoor won the title after defeating Carballés Baena 3–6, 7–5, 6–3 in the final.

== Seeds ==
1. (Spain) Roberto Carballés Baena (final)
2. (Netherlands) Tallon Griekspoor (champion)
3. (Australia) Marc Polmans (first round)
4. (Spain) Mario Vilella Martínez (first round)
5. (Argentina) Marco Trungelliti (second round, withdrew)
6. (India) Ramkumar Ramanathan (first round)
7. (Slovakia) Filip Horanský (second round)
8. (France) Mathias Bourgue (semifinals, retired)

== Draw ==
Key

- Q = Qualifier
- WC = Wild card
- LL = Lucky loser
- Alt = Alternate
- ITF = ITF entry
- PR = Protected ranking
- SR = Special ranking
- SE = Special exempt
- JE = Junior exempt
- JR = Junior Accelerator Programme entrant
- CO = College Accelerator Programme entrant
- NG = Next Gen Accelerator Program entrant
- w/o = Walkover
- r = Retired
- d = Defaulted

=== Finals ===
Semifinals
1	(Spain) Roberto Carballés Baena	6	3
8	(France) Mathias Bourgue	3	0^{r}
(Italy) Flavio Cobolli	6^{4}	1
2	(Netherlands) Tallon Griekspoor	7^{7}	6

Final
1	(Spain) Roberto Carballés Baena	6	5	3
2	(Netherlands) Tallon Griekspoor	3	7	6

=== Top half ===
First round
1	(Spain) R Carballés Baena	6	6
WC	(Spain) P Llamas Ruiz	3	2
WC	(Spain) D Rincón	3	2
Q	(United States) A Rybakov	6	6
(France) E Furness	7	4	6
(Spain) J Barranco Cosano	5	6	4
(Russia) A Shevchenko	6^{3}	6^{1}
5	(Argentina) M Trungelliti	7^{7}	7^{7}
3	(Australia) M Polmans	6	4	4
Q	(United States) Em Nava	3	6	6
PR	(Belgium) J De Loore	6	2	3
(Argentina) A Collarini	4	6	6
PR	(Belgium) Jeroen Vanneste	4	6	3
(Spain) R Ortega Olmedo	6	3	6
(Netherlands) J de Jong	6^{0}	5
8	(France) M Bourgue	7^{7}	7

Second round
1	(Spain) R Carballés Baena	6	6
Q	(United States) A Rybakov	2	2
(France) E Furness	w/o
5	(Argentina) M Trungelliti
Q	(United States) Em Nava	5	3
(Argentina) A Collarini	7	6
(Spain) R Ortega Olmedo	6^{4}	4
8	(France) M Bourgue	7^{7}	6

Quarterfinals
1	(Spain) R Carballés Baena	6	6
(France) E Furness	1	0
(Argentina) A Collarini	6	4	4
8	(France) M Bourgue	2	6	6

Semifinals
1	(Spain) R Carballés Baena	6	3
8	(France) M Bourgue	3	0^{r}

=== Bottom half ===
First round
7	(Slovakia) F Horanský	3	6	6
Q	(Italy) F Passaro	6	3	2
(Spain) N Kuhn	6	6
(Kazakhstan) T Skatov	2	4
(Czech Republic) D Svrčina	2	5
(Italy) R Brancaccio	6	7
(Italy) F Cobolli	7	6
4	(Spain) M Vilella Martínez	5	3
6	(India) R Ramanathan	6	4	3
(Serbia) M Zekić	3	6	6
Q	(Germany) M Rosenkranz	6	6
(France) M Martineau	0	4
(United States) A Ritschard	6	7^{8}
WC	(Spain) Á López San Martín	1	6^{6}
(Spain) N Sánchez Izquierdo	3	1
2	(Netherlands) T Griekspoor	6	6

Second round
7	(Slovakia) F Horanský	4	6	4
(Spain) N Kuhn	6	3	6
(Italy) R Brancaccio	6^{7}	6	6^{5}
(Italy) F Cobolli	7^{9}	2	7^{7}
(Serbia) M Zekić	6	6
Q	(Germany) M Rosenkranz	4	4
(United States) A Ritschard	6^{3}	3
2	(Netherlands) T Griekspoor	7^{7}	6

Quarterfinals
(Spain) N Kuhn	5	1
(Italy) F Cobolli	7	6
(Serbia) M Zekić	0	6	3
2	(Netherlands) T Griekspoor	6	0	6

Semifinals
(Italy) F Cobolli	6^{4}	1
2	(Netherlands) T Griekspoor	7^{7}	6
