= 2021 Murcia Open =

Tennis tournament

- Date: 27 September – 3 October
- Edition: 2nd
- Surface: Clay
- Location: Murcia, Spain

Champions

Singles
- (Netherlands) Tallon Griekspoor

Doubles
- (Italy) Raúl Brancaccio / (Italy) Flavio Cobolli
- Murcia Open

The 2021 Costa Cálida Región de Murcia was a professional tennis tournament played on clay courts. It was the 2nd edition of the tournament which was part of the 2021 ATP Challenger Tour. It took place in Murcia, Spain, between 27 September and 3 October 2021.

== Singles main-draw entrants ==
=== Seeds ===
Country	Player	Rank^{1}	Seed
ESP	Roberto Carballés Baena	89	1
NED	Tallon Griekspoor	132	2
AUS	Marc Polmans	165	3
ESP	Mario Vilella Martínez	171	4
ARG	Marco Trungelliti	176	5
IND	Ramkumar Ramanathan	192	6
SVK	Filip Horanský	204	7
FRA	Mathias Bourgue	213	8

- ^{1} Rankings are as of 20 September 2021.

=== Other entrants ===
The following players received wildcards into the singles main draw:

- (Spain) Pablo Llamas Ruiz
- (Spain) Álvaro López San Martín
- (Spain) Daniel Rincón

The following players received entry into the singles main draw using protected rankings:

- (Belgium) Joris De Loore
- (Belgium) Jeroen Vanneste

The following players received entry from the qualifying draw:

- (United States) Emilio Nava
- (Italy) Francesco Passaro
- (Germany) Mats Rosenkranz
- (United States) Alex Rybakov

== Champions ==
=== Singles ===
- (Netherlands) Tallon Griekspoor def. (Spain) Roberto Carballés Baena 3–6, 7–5, 6–3.

=== Doubles ===
- (Italy) Raúl Brancaccio / (Italy) Flavio Cobolli def. (Spain) Alberto Barroso Campos / (Spain) Roberto Carballés Baena 6–3, 7–6^{(7–4)}.
