= 2022 Murcia Open – Singles =

Singles
- 2022 Murcia Open

Final
- Champion: (Chinese Taipei) Tseng Chun-hsin
- Runner-up: (Slovakia) Norbert Gombos
- Score: 6–4, 6–1

Events
Singles	Doubles
- Murcia Open

Tallon Griekspoor was the defending champion but chose not to defend his title.

Tseng Chun-hsin won the title after defeating Norbert Gombos 6–4, 6–1 in the final.

== Seeds ==
1. (Slovakia) Norbert Gombos (final)
2. (Argentina) Juan Manuel Cerúndolo (first round, retired)
3. (Austria) Dennis Novak (semifinals)
4. (Chinese Taipei) Tseng Chun-hsin (champion)
5. (Spain) Mario Vilella Martínez (withdrew)
6. (Germany) Maximilian Marterer (first round)
7. (Argentina) Marco Trungelliti (quarterfinals)
8. (Italy) Andrea Pellegrino (first round)

== Draw ==
Key

- Q = Qualifier
- WC = Wild card
- LL = Lucky loser
- Alt = Alternate
- ITF = ITF entry
- PR = Protected ranking
- SR = Special ranking
- SE = Special exempt
- JE = Junior exempt
- JR = Junior Accelerator Programme entrant
- CO = College Accelerator Programme entrant
- NG = Next Gen Accelerator Program entrant
- w/o = Walkover
- r = Retired
- d = Defaulted

=== Finals ===
Semifinals
1	(Slovakia) Norbert Gombos	1	6	7^{7}
3	(Austria) Dennis Novak	6	1	6^{2}
4	(Chinese Taipei) Tseng Chun-hsin	6	6
WC	Ivan Gakhov	4	4

Final
1	(Slovakia) Norbert Gombos	4	1
4	(Chinese Taipei) Tseng Chun-hsin	6	6

=== Top half ===
First round
1	(Slovakia) N Gombos	6	6
(United States) Em Nava	4	4
(Spain) O Roca Batalla	7	6
WC	(Spain) C Sánchez Jover	5	4
(Spain) J Barranco Cosano	4	6	6^{6}
Q	(Belgium) M Geerts	6	3	7^{8}
A Kuznetsov	3	2^{r}
7	(Argentina) M Trungelliti	6	5
3	(Austria) D Novak	6	7
(Austria) F Misolic	3	5
Q	(United States) U Blanch	2	4
Q	(Spain) M Damas	6	6
(Germany) N Kuhn	6	2	1
WC	(Spain) C Gimeno Valero	3	6	6
A Shevchenko	4	6^{2}
LL	(Belgium) Christopher Heyman	6	7^{7}

Second round
1	(Slovakia) N Gombos	5	6	7^{7}
(Spain) O Roca Batalla	7	3	6^{2}
Q	(Belgium) M Geerts	3	6	3
7	(Argentina) M Trungelliti	6	3	6
3	(Austria) D Novak	6	6
Q	(Spain) M Damas	0	2
WC	(Spain) C Gimeno Valero	6	6
LL	(Belgium) C Heyman	3	3

Quarterfinals
1	(Slovakia) N Gombos	6	6
7	(Argentina) M Trungelliti	0	4
3	(Austria) D Novak	3	7^{7}	6
WC	(Spain) C Gimeno Valero	6	6^{4}	3

Semifinals
1	(Slovakia) N Gombos	1	6	7^{7}
3	(Austria) D Novak	6	1	6^{2}

=== Bottom half ===
First round
6	(Germany) M Marterer	0	7^{7}	3
(Argentina) P Cachin	6	6^{4}	6
(Austria) S Ofner	3	3
(Italy) R Brancaccio	6	6
(Spain) N Álvarez Varona	6	3	4
Q	(Spain) D Mérida	2	6	6
Q	(Ukraine) O Krutykh	3	3
4	(Chinese Taipei) C-h Tseng	6	6
8	(Italy) A Pellegrino	3	6	3
(Slovakia) L Klein	6	1	6
(Czech Republic) J Forejtek	7	6
Q	(Germany) R Molleker	5	3
(Italy) L Giustino	7^{7}	4	6
(Switzerland) J Nikles	6^{5}	6	4
WC	I Gakhov	3	7^{7}	2
2	(Argentina) JM Cerúndolo	6	6^{3}	0^{r}

Second round
(Argentina) P Cachin	6	6
(Italy) R Brancaccio	1	3
Q	(Spain) D Mérida	2	3
4	(Chinese Taipei) C-h Tseng	6	6
(Slovakia) L Klein	3	5
(Czech Republic) J Forejtek	6	7
(Italy) L Giustino	4	3
WC	I Gakhov	6	6

Quarterfinals
(Argentina) P Cachin	6^{5}	3
4	(Chinese Taipei) C-h Tseng	7^{7}	6
(Czech Republic) J Forejtek	6^{5}	6	5
WC	I Gakhov	7^{7}	4	7

Semifinals
4	(Chinese Taipei) C-h Tseng	6	6
WC	I Gakhov	4	4
