= 2019 Murcia Open – Singles =

Singles
- 2019 Murcia Open

Final
- Champion: (Spain) Roberto Carballés Baena
- Runner-up: (Sweden) Mikael Ymer
- Score: 2–6, 6–0, 6–2

Events
Singles	Doubles
- Murcia Open

This was the first edition of the tournament.

Roberto Carballés Baena won the title after defeating Mikael Ymer 2–6, 6–0, 6–2 in the final.

== Seeds ==
All seeds receive a bye into the second round.

1. (Portugal) Pedro Sousa (third round)
2. (Spain) Roberto Carballés Baena (champion)
3. (Brazil) Thiago Monteiro (second round)
4. (Czech Republic) Lukáš Rosol (third round)
5. (Spain) Pedro Martínez (second round)
6. (Italy) Salvatore Caruso (quarterfinals)
7. (Belgium) Ruben Bemelmans (second round)
8. (Belgium) Arthur De Greef (second round)
9. (Germany) Rudolf Molleker (quarterfinals)
10. (Spain) Daniel Gimeno Traver (second round)
11. (Argentina) Facundo Argüello (second round)
12. (Spain) Enrique López Pérez (quarterfinals)
13. (Belgium) Kimmer Coppejans (semifinals)
14. (Sweden) Mikael Ymer (final)
15. (Netherlands) Tallon Griekspoor (semifinals, withdrew)
16. (Spain) Sergio Gutiérrez Ferrol (third round)

== Draw ==
Key

- Q = Qualifier
- WC = Wild card
- LL = Lucky loser
- Alt = Alternate
- ITF = ITF entry
- PR = Protected ranking
- SR = Special ranking
- SE = Special exempt
- JE = Junior exempt
- JR = Junior Accelerator Programme entrant
- CO = College Accelerator Programme entrant
- NG = Next Gen Accelerator Program entrant
- w/o = Walkover
- r = Retired
- d = Defaulted

=== Finals ===
Quarterfinals
15	(Netherlands) Tallon Griekspoor	7^{7}	6
6	(Italy) Salvatore Caruso	6^{4}	4
14	(Sweden) Mikael Ymer	7	6
9	(Germany) Rudolf Molleker	5	0
(Spain) Bernabé Zapata Miralles	6	6^{8}	5
13	(Belgium) Kimmer Coppejans	1	7^{10}	7
12	(Spain) Enrique López Pérez	1	7^{7}	6^{2}
2	(Spain) Roberto Carballés Baena	6	6^{3}	7^{7}

Semifinals
15	(Netherlands) Tallon Griekspoor
14	(Sweden) Mikael Ymer	w/o
13	(Belgium) Kimmer Coppejans	6	2	3
2	(Spain) Roberto Carballés Baena	4	6	6

Final
14	(Sweden) Mikael Ymer	6	0	2
2	(Spain) Roberto Carballés Baena	2	6	6

=== Top half ===
==== Section 1 ====
First round
WC	(Spain) G Granollers	6	6
ITF	(Spain) D Pérez Sanz	3	2
Alt	(Spain) P Riba	4	6	3^{r}
ITF	(Spain) O Roca Batalla	6	4	5
(Argentina) P Cachin	6	6
(Austria) L Miedler	3	3
(Spain) Carlos Boluda-Purkiss	6	6
ITF	(Russia) I Nedelko	2	0

Second round
1	(Portugal) P Sousa	6	6
WC	(Spain) G Granollers	2	3
ITF	(Spain) O Roca Batalla	6	2	6^{5}
15	(Netherlands) T Griekspoor	3	6	7^{7}
10	(Spain) D Gimeno Traver	6	3	3
(Argentina) P Cachin	3	6	6
(Spain) C Boluda-Purkiss	0	5
6	(Italy) S Caruso	6	7

Third round
1	(Portugal) P Sousa	5	6^{6}
15	(Netherlands) T Griekspoor	7	7^{8}
(Argentina) P Cachin	2	4
6	(Italy) S Caruso	6	6

Quarterfinals
15	(Netherlands) T Griekspoor	7^{7}	6
6	(Italy) S Caruso	6^{4}	4

==== Section 2 ====
First round
LL	(Brazil) F Neis	7^{7}	6^{2}	3
ITF	(Italy) R Brancaccio	6^{3}	7^{7}	6
Q	(Spain) D Vega Hernández	3	3
(United Kingdom) J Choinski	6	6
(Serbia) D Petrović	2	6	4
(Spain) T Robredo	6	2	6
(France) G Sakharov	6^{6}	4
WC	(Spain) C Alcaraz	7^{8}	6

Second round
3	(Brazil) T Monteiro	6	4	6^{1}
ITF	(Italy) R Brancaccio	4	6	7^{7}
(United Kingdom) J Choinski	2	4
14	(Sweden) M Ymer	6	6
9	(Germany) R Molleker	6	4	6
(Spain) T Robredo	3	6	2
WC	(Spain) C Alcaraz	6	7^{7}
5/SE	(Spain) P Martínez	3	6^{4}

Third round
ITF	(Italy) R Brancaccio	5	3
14	(Sweden) M Ymer	7	6
9	(Germany) R Molleker	6	6^{5}	6
WC	(Spain) C Alcaraz	1	7^{7}	3

Quarterfinals
14	(Sweden) M Ymer	7	6
9	(Germany) R Molleker	5	0

=== Bottom half ===
==== Section 3 ====
First round
(France) J Tatlot	2	6	1
(Spain) B Zapata Miralles	6	1	6
WC	(Spain) N Almagro	2	2
(Spain) M Vilella Martínez	6	6
ITF	(Italy) R Bonadio	2	1
(Hungary) A Balázs	6	6
(France) B Bonzi	6	3	6
WC	(Russia) I Gakhov	3	6	3

Second round
8	(Belgium) A De Greef	4	1
(Spain) B Zapata Miralles	6	6
(Spain) M Vilella Martínez	6	6
11	(Argentina) F Argüello	1	4
13	(Belgium) K Coppejans	6	3	6
(Hungary) A Balázs	4	6	3
(France) B Bonzi	6	4	5
4	(Czech Republic) L Rosol	2	6	7

Third round
(Spain) B Zapata Miralles	7^{7}	6
(Spain) M Vilella Martínez	6^{1}	4
13	(Belgium) K Coppejans	7	2	7
4	(Czech Republic) L Rosol	5	6	5

Quarterfinals
(Spain) B Zapata Miralles	6	6^{8}	5
13	(Belgium) K Coppejans	1	7^{10}	7

==== Section 4 ====
First round
(Dominican Republic) J Hernández-Fernández	6	3	7^{7}
Q	(Italy) A Vavassori	2	6	6^{3}
(Spain) R Ortega Olmedo	6	6
WC	(Spain) Carlos López Montagud	4	1
(Brazil) T Bellucci	3	6	6
(Portugal) J Domingues	6	4	0
(Italy) F Gaio	6	6
(Germany) T Kamke	1	4

Second round
7	(Belgium) R Bemelmans	6	5	2
(Dominican Republic) J Hernández-Fernández	3	7	6
(Spain) R Ortega Olmedo	1	3
12	(Spain) E López Pérez	6	6
16	(Spain) S Gutiérrez Ferrol	7^{7}	6
(Brazil) T Bellucci	6^{4}	3
(Italy) F Gaio	0	4
2	(Spain) R Carballés Baena	6	6

Third round
(Dominican Republic) J Hernández-Fernández	4	1^{r}
12	(Spain) E López Pérez	6	3
16	(Spain) S Gutiérrez Ferrol	1	4
2	(Spain) R Carballés Baena	6	6

Quarterfinals
12	(Spain) E López Pérez	1	7^{7}	6^{2}
2	(Spain) R Carballés Baena	6	6^{3}	7^{7}
