= 2024 Murcia Open – Doubles =

Doubles
- 2024 Murcia Open

Final
- Champions: (France) Théo Arribagé (Romania) Victor Vlad Cornea
- Runners-up: (India) Arjun Kadhe (India) Jeevan Nedunchezhiyan
- Score: 7–5, 6–1

Events
Singles	Doubles
- Murcia Open

Daniel Rincón and Abdullah Shelbayh were the defending champions but chose not to defend their title.

Théo Arribagé and Victor Vlad Cornea won the title after defeating Arjun Kadhe and Jeevan Nedunchezhiyan 7–5, 6–1 in the final.

== Seeds ==
1. (France) Théo Arribagé / (Romania) Victor Vlad Cornea (champions)
2. (Netherlands) Bart Stevens / (Greece) Petros Tsitsipas (quarterfinals)
3. (United Kingdom) Luke Johnson / (Venezuela) Luis David Martínez (first round)
4. (India) Anirudh Chandrasekar / (India) Vijay Sundar Prashanth (quarterfinals)

== Draw ==
Key

- Q = Qualifier
- WC = Wild card
- LL = Lucky loser
- Alt = Alternate
- ITF = ITF entry
- PR = Protected ranking
- SR = Special ranking
- SE = Special exempt
- JE = Junior exempt
- JR = Junior Accelerator Programme entrant
- CO = College Accelerator Programme entrant
- NG = Next Gen Accelerator Program entrant
- w/o = Walkover
- r = Retired
- d = Defaulted

=== Draw ===
First round
1	(France) T Arribagé (Romania) VV Cornea	6	6
(Pakistan) A-u-H Qureshi (Spain) D Vega Hernández	1	4
(United Kingdom) J Choinski (Kazakhstan) D Yevseyev	6	6
WC	(Spain) J Barranco Cosano (Spain) P Llamas Ruiz	1	4
4	(India) A Chandrasekar (India) VS Prashanth	6	6
(India) RC Bollipalli (India) N Kaliyanda Poonacha	3	3
(Switzerland) L Margaroli (Argentina) S Rodríguez Taverna	4	6	[10]
(Spain) S Martos Gornés (Spain) O Roca Batalla	6	3	[8]
(India) S Balaji (Germany) A Begemann	6	6
(Sweden) A Göransson (Italy) A Pellegrino	3	2
(Portugal) F Cabral (Portugal) H Rocha	6	4	[12]
3	(United Kingdom) L Johnson (Venezuela) LD Martínez	2	6	[10]
(India) A Kadhe (India) J Nedunchezhiyan	6	6
I Liutarevich (Ukraine) V Manafov	4	4
WC	I Gakhov (Romania) A Jecan	3	6	[10]
2	(Netherlands) B Stevens (Greece) Pe Tsitsipas	6	3	[12]

Quarterfinals
1	(France) T Arribagé (Romania) VV Cornea	7	6
(United Kingdom) J Choinski (Kazakhstan) D Yevseyev	5	3
4	(India) A Chandrasekar (India) VS Prashanth	3	5
(Switzerland) L Margaroli (Argentina) S Rodríguez Taverna	6	7
(India) S Balaji (Germany) A Begemann	6	3	[7]
(Portugal) F Cabral (Portugal) H Rocha	4	6	[10]
(India) A Kadhe (India) J Nedunchezhiyan	6	6
2	(Netherlands) B Stevens (Greece) Pe Tsitsipas	4	2

Semifinals
1	(France) T Arribagé (Romania) VV Cornea	6	6
(Switzerland) L Margaroli (Argentina) S Rodríguez Taverna	4	4
(Portugal) F Cabral (Portugal) H Rocha	4	6^{4}
(India) A Kadhe (India) J Nedunchezhiyan	6	7^{7}

Final
1	(France) T Arribagé (Romania) VV Cornea	7	6
(India) A Kadhe (India) J Nedunchezhiyan	5	1
