= 2024 Murcia Open – Singles =

Singles
- 2024 Murcia Open

Final
- Champion: (Portugal) Henrique Rocha
- Runner-up: (Georgia (country)) Nikoloz Basilashvili
- Score: 3–6, 7–6^{(7–0)}, 7–5

Events
Singles	Doubles
- Murcia Open

Matteo Arnaldi was the defending champion but chose not to defend his title.

Henrique Rocha won the title after defeating Nikoloz Basilashvili 3–6, 7–6^{(7–0)}, 7–5 in the final.

== Seeds ==
1. (Spain) Albert Ramos Viñolas (semifinals)
2. (France) Richard Gasquet (quarterfinals)
3. (France) Grégoire Barrère (second round)
4. (Netherlands) Jesper de Jong (first round)
5. (Moldova) Radu Albot (quarterfinals)
6. (Spain) Pablo Llamas Ruiz (semifinals)
7. (Italy) Andrea Pellegrino (second round)
8. (Italy) Stefano Napolitano (first round)

== Draw ==
Key

- Q = Qualifier
- WC = Wild card
- LL = Lucky loser
- Alt = Alternate
- ITF = ITF entry
- PR = Protected ranking
- SR = Special ranking
- SE = Special exempt
- JE = Junior exempt
- JR = Junior Accelerator Programme entrant
- CO = College Accelerator Programme entrant
- NG = Next Gen Accelerator Program entrant
- w/o = Walkover
- r = Retired
- d = Defaulted

=== Finals ===
Semifinals
1	(Spain) Albert Ramos Viñolas	4	2
Q	(Georgia (country)) Nikoloz Basilashvili	6	6
Alt	(Portugal) Henrique Rocha	6	4	6
6	(Spain) Pablo Llamas Ruiz	3	6	2

Final
Q	(Georgia (country)) Nikoloz Basilashvili	6	6^{0}	5
Alt	(Portugal) Henrique Rocha	3	7^{7}	7

=== Top half ===
First round
1	(Spain) A Ramos Viñolas	6	7^{7}
Q	(Spain) C Taberner	3	6^{5}
(France) C Hemery	3	1
LL	(Spain) D Jordà Sanchis	6	6
Q	(Germany) N Kuhn	4	6	3
(China) Y Bu	6	3	6
Q	(Spain) N Álvarez Varona	6	2	6
8	(Italy) S Napolitano	0	6	4
4	(Netherlands) J de Jong	3	2
Q	(Georgia (country)) N Basilashvili	6	6
(France) U Blanchet	4	6	6
Alt	(Spain) A Moro Cañas	6	3	3
WC	(Spain) J Barranco Cosano	6	4	3
(Argentina) M Trungelliti	4	6	6
WC	(Spain) D Mérida	4	7^{7}	3
7	(Italy) A Pellegrino	6	6^{4}	6

Second round
1	(Spain) A Ramos Viñolas	6	3	7^{8}
LL	(Spain) D Jordà Sanchis	2	6	6^{6}
(China) Y Bu	7^{7}	6
Q	(Spain) N Álvarez Varona	6^{5}	3
Q	(Georgia (country)) N Basilashvili	6	7
(France) U Blanchet	2	5
(Argentina) M Trungelliti	7	3	6
7	(Italy) A Pellegrino	5	6	3

Quarterfinals
1	(Spain) A Ramos Viñolas	7	3	6
(China) Y Bu	5	6	1
Q	(Georgia (country)) N Basilashvili	4	6	6
(Argentina) M Trungelliti	6	3	4

Semifinals
1	(Spain) A Ramos Viñolas	4	2
Q	(Georgia (country)) N Basilashvili	6	6

=== Bottom half ===
First round
5	(Moldova) R Albot	6	6
(Italy) M Cecchinato	4	3
Alt	(France) M Bourgue	7	6
WC	(Spain) N Sánchez Izquierdo	5	3
Alt	(Portugal) H Rocha	6	6
(Spain) O Roca Batalla	4	2
Q	(Portugal) G Elias	6^{4}	2
3	(France) G Barrère	7^{7}	6
6	(Spain) P Llamas Ruiz	7^{7}	7^{8}
(United Kingdom) J Choinski	6^{3}	6^{6}
SE	(Chinese Taipei) C-h Tseng	4	6	3
I Gakhov	6	3	6
Q	(Italy) Samuel Vincent Ruggeri	7^{7}	6
(South Africa) L Harris	6^{4}	2
(Argentina) S Rodríguez Taverna	4	4
2	(France) R Gasquet	6	6

Second round
5	(Moldova) R Albot	7^{7}	2	6
Alt	(France) M Bourgue	6^{5}	6	4
Alt	(Portugal) H Rocha	6	7^{7}
3	(France) G Barrère	4	6^{3}
6	(Spain) P Llamas Ruiz	6	7
I Gakhov	3	5
Q	(Italy) S Vincent Ruggeri	3	6	0
2	(France) R Gasquet	6	4	6

Quarterfinals
5	(Moldova) R Albot	2	2
Alt	(Portugal) H Rocha	6	6
6	(Spain) P Llamas Ruiz	6	3	7
2	(France) R Gasquet	2	6	5

Semifinals
Alt	(Portugal) H Rocha	6	4	6
6	(Spain) P Llamas Ruiz	3	6	2
