= 2022 Murcia Open – Doubles =

Doubles
- 2022 Murcia Open

Final
- Champions: (Spain) Íñigo Cervantes (Spain) Oriol Roca Batalla
- Runners-up: (Argentina) Pedro Cachin (Uruguay) Martín Cuevas
- Score: 6–7^{(4–7)}, 7–6^{(7–4)}, [10–7]

Events
Singles	Doubles
- Murcia Open

Raúl Brancaccio and Flavio Cobolli were the defending champions but only Brancaccio chose to defend his title, partnering Javier Barranco Cosano. Brancaccio lost in the quarterfinals to Íñigo Cervantes and Oriol Roca Batalla.

Cervantes and Roca Batalla won the title after defeating Pedro Cachin and Martín Cuevas 6–7^{(4–7)}, 7–6^{(7–4)}, [10–7] in the final.

== Seeds ==
1. (Argentina) Pedro Cachin / (Uruguay) Martín Cuevas (final)
2. (Spain) Alberto Barroso Campos / (Spain) Sergio Martos Gornés (semifinals)
3. (Belgium) Michael Geerts / (Netherlands) Mats Hermans (quarterfinals)
4. Ivan Liutarevich / (Ukraine) Vladyslav Manafov (first round)

== Draw ==
Key

- Q = Qualifier
- WC = Wild card
- LL = Lucky loser
- Alt = Alternate
- ITF = ITF entry
- PR = Protected ranking
- SR = Special ranking
- SE = Special exempt
- JE = Junior exempt
- JR = Junior Accelerator Programme entrant
- CO = College Accelerator Programme entrant
- NG = Next Gen Accelerator Program entrant
- w/o = Walkover
- r = Retired
- d = Defaulted

First round
1	(Argentina) P Cachin (Uruguay) M Cuevas	6^{4}	7^{7}	[10]
WC	(Spain) P Llamas Ruiz (Spain) Pablo Martínez Gómez	7^{7}	6^{4}	[3]
(Ukraine) O Krutykh (Israel) Y Oliel	7^{7}	7
(Spain) N Álvarez Varona; I Gakhov	6^{3}	5
3	(Belgium) M Geerts (Netherlands) M Hermans	6	6
WC	(Spain) D Marrero (United States) Dhruva Mulye	4	1
Alt	(Spain) Carlos López Montagud (Switzerland) J Nikles	6	6
(Germany) R Molleker; A Shevchenko	4	4
PR	(Spain) Í Cervantes (Spain) O Roca Batalla	7	7
Alt	(India) A Chandrasekar (India) VS Prashanth	5	5
(Spain) J Barranco Cosano (Italy) R Brancaccio	6	6
4	I Liutarevich (Ukraine) V Manafov	4	2
(Italy) A Pellegrino (Chinese Taipei) C-h Tseng	6	3	[10]
(Romania) A Jecan (Ukraine) V Orlov	1	6	[6]
(Croatia) Z Babić (Bulgaria) A Donski	4	4
2	(Spain) A Barroso Campos (Spain) S Martos Gornés	6	6

Quarterfinals
1	(Argentina) P Cachin (Uruguay) M Cuevas	7	6
(Ukraine) O Krutykh (Israel) Y Oliel	5	3
3	(Belgium) M Geerts (Netherlands) M Hermans	1	6	[6]
Alt	(Spain) C López Montagud (Switzerland) J Nikles	6	2	[10]
PR	(Spain) Í Cervantes (Spain) O Roca Batalla	4	6	[10]
(Spain) J Barranco Cosano (Italy) R Brancaccio	6	2	[8]
(Italy) A Pellegrino (Chinese Taipei) C-h Tseng	6^{5}	4
2	(Spain) A Barroso Campos (Spain) S Martos Gornés	7^{7}	6

Semifinals
1	(Argentina) P Cachin (Uruguay) M Cuevas	6	5	[18]
Alt	(Spain) C López Montagud (Switzerland) J Nikles	3	7	[16]
PR	(Spain) Í Cervantes (Spain) O Roca Batalla	6	3	[10]
2	(Spain) A Barroso Campos (Spain) S Martos Gornés	3	6	[7]

Final
1	(Argentina) P Cachin (Uruguay) M Cuevas	7^{7}	6^{4}	[7]
PR	(Spain) Í Cervantes (Spain) O Roca Batalla	6^{4}	7^{7}	[10]
