= 2026 Murcia Open – Doubles =

Doubles
- 2026 Murcia Open

Final
- Champions: (Lebanon) Benjamin Hassan (Austria) Sebastian Ofner
- Runners-up: (Poland) Karol Drzewiecki (Poland) Piotr Matuszewski
- Score: 6–3, 6–4

Events
| Singles | Doubles |
- Murcia Open

Grégoire Jacq and Orlando Luz were the defending champions but chose not to defend their title.

Benjamin Hassan and Sebastian Ofner won the title after defeating Karol Drzewiecki and Piotr Matuszewski 6–3, 6–4 in the final.

== Seeds ==
1. (New Zealand) Finn Reynolds / (New Zealand) James Watt (first round)
2. (Poland) Karol Drzewiecki / (Poland) Piotr Matuszewski (final)
3. (Romania) Alexandru Jecan / (Japan) Seita Watanabe (first round)
4. (Ukraine) Denys Molchanov / (Romania) Bogdan Pavel (first round)

== Draw ==
Key

- Q = Qualifier
- WC = Wild card
- LL = Lucky loser
- Alt = Alternate
- ITF = ITF entry
- PR = Protected ranking
- SR = Special ranking
- SE = Special exempt
- JE = Junior exempt
- JR = Junior Accelerator Programme entrant
- CO = College Accelerator Programme entrant
- NG = Next Gen Accelerator Program entrant
- w/o = Walkover
- r = Retired
- d = Defaulted

First round
1 | (New Zealand) F Reynolds (New Zealand) J Watt | 6^{4} | 6^{4}
(Spain) S Martos Gornés (India) VSP Natarajan | 7^{7} | 7^{7}
(Belgium) GA Bailly (Germany) J Engel | 0 | 4
(Lebanon) B Hassan (Austria) S Ofner | 6 | 6
3 | (Romania) A Jecan (Japan) S Watanabe | 6^{5} | 3
I Liutarevich (Spain) B Pujol Navarro | 7^{7} | 6
(Spain) Í Cervantes (Romania) V Cornea | 2 | 5
(India) N Kaliyanda Poonacha (Poland) S Walków | 6 | 7
(Netherlands) J de Jong (Netherlands) M Houkes | 7^{8} | 3 | [9]
(Czech Republic) A Paulson (Czech Republic) M Vrbenský | 6^{6} | 6 | [11]
(Peru) A Merino (Germany) C Negritu | 6 | 6
4 | (Ukraine) D Molchanov (Romania) B Pavel | 3 | 4
WC | (Italy) R Brancaccio (Spain) Pablo de la Cierva | 3 | 4
WC | (Spain) P Llamas Ruiz (Spain) B Winter López | 6 | 6
(Spain) M Mansilla Díez (Spain) D Vega Hernández | 2 | 2
2 | (Poland) K Drzewiecki (Poland) P Matuszewski | 6 | 6

Quarterfinals
(Spain) S Martos Gornés (India) VSP Natarajan | 1 | 3
(Lebanon) B Hassan (Austria) S Ofner | 6 | 6
I Liutarevich (Spain) B Pujol Navarro | 6 | 3 | [10]
(India) N Kaliyanda Poonacha (Poland) S Walków | 4 | 6 | [8]
(Czech Republic) A Paulson (Czech Republic) M Vrbenský | 3 | 0
(Peru) A Merino (Germany) C Negritu | 6 | 6
WC | (Spain) P Llamas Ruiz (Spain) B Winter López | 1 | 4
2 | (Poland) K Drzewiecki (Poland) P Matuszewski | 6 | 6

Semifinals
(Lebanon) B Hassan (Austria) S Ofner | 6 | 2 | [10]
I Liutarevich (Spain) B Pujol Navarro | 4 | 6 | [8]
(Peru) A Merino (Germany) C Negritu | 5 | 1
2 | (Poland) K Drzewiecki (Poland) P Matuszewski | 7 | 6

Final
(Lebanon) B Hassan (Austria) S Ofner | 6 | 6
2 | (Poland) K Drzewiecki (Poland) P Matuszewski | 3 | 4
