= 2026 Murcia Open =

- Date: 16 – 22 March
- Edition: 7th
- Surface: Clay
- Location: Murcia, Spain

Champions

Singles
- (Spain) Pablo Carreño Busta

Doubles
- (Lebanon) Benjamin Hassan / (Austria) Sebastian Ofner
- Murcia Open

The 2026 VII Challenger Costa Cálida Región de Murcia was a professional tennis tournament played on clay courts. It was the 7th edition of the tournament which was part of the 2026 ATP Challenger Tour. It took place in Murcia, Spain, between 16 and 22 March 2026.

== Singles main-draw entrants ==
=== Seeds ===
Country	Player	Rank^{1}	Seed
NED	Jesper de Jong	86	1
LTU	Vilius Gaubas	101	2
ESP	Pablo Carreño Busta	107	3
AUT	Sebastian Ofner	108	4
DEN	Elmer Møller	121	5
GBR	Jan Choinski	122	6
ITA	Andrea Pellegrino	125	7
ESP	Roberto Carballés Baena	168	8

- ^{1} Rankings are as of 2 March 2026.

=== Other entrants ===
The following players received wildcards into the singles main draw:

- (Spain) ~~Javier Barranco Cosano~~
- (Italy) Raúl Brancaccio
- (Spain) Alejo Sánchez Quílez

The following players received entry into the singles main draw as alternates:

- (Spain) Carlos Sánchez Jover
- (Jordan) Abdullah Shelbayh

The following players received entry from the qualifying draw:

- (Portugal) Frederico Ferreira Silva
- (United Kingdom) Felix Gill
- (Spain) David Jordà Sanchis
- (Germany) Christoph Negritu
- (Poland) Filip Pieczonka
- (Germany) Louis Wessels

The following player received entry as a lucky loser:

- (Georgia (country)) Saba Purtseladze

== Champions ==
=== Singles ===
- (Spain) Pablo Carreño Busta def. (Spain) Roberto Carballés Baena 6–4, 6–3.

=== Doubles ===
- (Lebanon) Benjamin Hassan / (Austria) Sebastian Ofner def. (Poland) Karol Drzewiecki / (Poland) Piotr Matuszewski 6–3, 6–4.
