= 2024 Murcia Open =

- Date: 18 – 24 March
- Edition: 5th
- Surface: Clay
- Location: Murcia, Spain

Champions

Singles
- (Portugal) Henrique Rocha

Doubles
- (France) Théo Arribagé / (Romania) Victor Vlad Cornea
- Murcia Open

The 2024 Costa Cálida Región de Murcia, was a professional tennis tournament played on clay courts. It was the 5th edition of the tournament which was part of the 2024 ATP Challenger Tour. It took place in Murcia, Spain, between 18 and 24 March 2024.

== Singles main-draw entrants ==
=== Seeds ===
| Country | Player | Rank^{1} | Seed |
|---|---|---|---|
| ESP | Albert Ramos Viñolas | 102 | 1 |
| FRA | Richard Gasquet | 118 | 2 |
| FRA | Grégoire Barrère | 121 | 3 |
| NED | Jesper de Jong | 137 | 4 |
| MDA | Radu Albot | 152 | 5 |
| ESP | Pablo Llamas Ruiz | 153 | 6 |
| ITA | Andrea Pellegrino | 157 | 7 |
| ITA | Stefano Napolitano | 163 | 8 |

- ^{1} Rankings are as of 4 March 2024.

=== Other entrants ===
The following players received wildcards into the singles main draw:

- (Spain) Javier Barranco Cosano
- (Spain) Daniel Mérida
- (Spain) Nikolás Sánchez Izquierdo

The following player received entry into the singles main draw as a special exempt:

- (Chinese Taipei) Tseng Chun-hsin

The following players received entry into the singles main draw as alternates:

- (France) Mathias Bourgue
- (Spain) Alejandro Moro Cañas
- (Portugal) Henrique Rocha

The following players received entry from the qualifying draw:

- (Spain) Nicolás Álvarez Varona
- (Georgia (country)) Nikoloz Basilashvili
- (Portugal) Gastão Elias
- (Germany) Nicola Kuhn
- (Spain) Carlos Taberner
- (Italy) Samuel Vincent Ruggeri

The following player received entry as a lucky loser:

- (Spain) David Jordà Sanchis

== Champions ==
=== Singles ===
- (Portugal) Henrique Rocha def. (Georgia (country)) Nikoloz Basilashvili 3–6, 7–6^{(7–0)}, 7–5.

=== Doubles ===
- (France) Théo Arribagé / (Romania) Victor Vlad Cornea def. (India) Arjun Kadhe / (India) Jeevan Nedunchezhiyan 7–5, 6–1.
