= 2022 Murcia Open =

- Date: 4 – 10 April
- Edition: 3rd
- Surface: Clay
- Location: Murcia, Spain

Champions

Singles
- (Chinese Taipei) Tseng Chun-hsin

Doubles
- (Spain) Íñigo Cervantes / (Spain) Oriol Roca Batalla
- Murcia Open

The 2022 Costa Cálida Región de Murcia was a professional tennis tournament played on clay courts. It was the 3rd edition of the tournament which was part of the 2022 ATP Challenger Tour. It took place in Murcia, Spain, between 4 and 10 April 2022.

== Singles main-draw entrants ==
=== Seeds ===
Country	Player	Rank^{1}	Seed
SVK	Norbert Gombos	112	1
ARG	Juan Manuel Cerúndolo	122	2
AUT	Dennis Novak	140	3
TPE	Tseng Chun-hsin	148	4
~~ESP~~	~~Mario Vilella Martínez~~	~~172~~	~~5~~
GER	Maximilian Marterer	192	6
ARG	Marco Trungelliti	194	7
ITA	Andrea Pellegrino	196	8

- ^{1} Rankings are as of 21 March 2022.

=== Other entrants ===
The following players received wildcards into the singles main draw:

- Ivan Gakhov
- (Spain) Carlos Gimeno Valero
- (Spain) Carlos Sánchez Jover

The following players received entry from the qualifying draw:

- (United States) Ulises Blanch
- (Spain) Miguel Damas
- (Belgium) Michael Geerts
- (Ukraine) Oleksii Krutykh
- (Spain) Daniel Mérida
- (Germany) Rudolf Molleker

The following player received entry as a lucky loser:

- (Belgium) Christopher Heyman

== Champions ==
=== Singles ===
- (Chinese Taipei) Tseng Chun-hsin def. (Slovakia) Norbert Gombos 6–4, 6–1.

=== Doubles ===
- (Spain) Íñigo Cervantes / (Spain) Oriol Roca Batalla def. (Argentina) Pedro Cachin / (Uruguay) Martín Cuevas 6–7^{(4–7)}, 7–6^{(7–4)}, [10–7].
