= 2016 San Luis Open Challenger Tour – Singles =

Singles
- 2016 San Luis Open Challenger Tour

Final
- Champions: (Serbia) Peđa Krstin
- Runners-up: (El Salvador) Marcelo Arévalo
- Score: 6–4, 6–2

Events
Singles	Doubles
- San Luis Open Challenger Tour

Guido Pella was the defending champion, but chose not to defend his title.

Peđa Krstin won the title, defeating Marcelo Arévalo 6–4, 6–2 in the final.

== Seeds ==
1. (Germany) Michael Berrer (first round)
2. (Spain) Albert Montañés (semifinals)
3. (Brazil) André Ghem (quarterfinals)
4. (Spain) Adrián Menéndez Maceiras (first round)
5. (Italy) Matteo Donati (second round)
6. (France) Mathias Bourgue (second round)
7. (Chile) Hans Podlipnik (quarterfinals)
8. (Republic of Ireland) James McGee (first round)

== Draw ==
Key

- Q = Qualifier
- WC = Wild card
- LL = Lucky loser
- Alt = Alternate
- ITF = ITF entry
- PR = Protected ranking
- SR = Special ranking
- SE = Special exempt
- JE = Junior exempt
- JR = Junior Accelerator Programme entrant
- CO = College Accelerator Programme entrant
- NG = Next Gen Accelerator Program entrant
- w/o = Walkover
- r = Retired
- d = Defaulted

=== Finals ===
Semifinals
(Italy) Federico Gaio	1	4
Q	(El Salvador) Marcelo Arévalo	6	6
(Serbia) Peđa Krstin	6	6
2	(Spain) Albert Montañés	2	4

Final
Q	(El Salvador) Marcelo Arévalo	4	2
(Serbia) Peđa Krstin	6	6

=== Top half ===
First round
1	(Germany) M Berrer	3	7^{7}	5
(Italy) F Gaio	6	6^{5}	7
(Serbia) N Milojević	6	6
(Spain) O Roca Batalla	4	3
WC	(Mexico) M Sánchez	3	2
(Spain) J Samper Montaña	6	6
(Chinese Taipei) J Jung	4	0
7	(Chile) H Podlipnik	6	6
3	(Brazil) A Ghem	7	7^{7}
(Austria) D Novak	5	6^{2}
WC	(Mexico) L Gómez	6	6
(Kazakhstan) D Popko	2	0
Q	(El Salvador) M Arévalo	6	6
WC	(Mexico) Mauricio Astorga	2	3
(United States) D Nguyen	4	4
5	(Italy) M Donati	6	6

Second round
(Italy) F Gaio	6	6
(Serbia) N Milojević	3	1
(Spain) J Samper Montaña	3	4
7	(Chile) H Podlipnik	6	6
3	(Brazil) A Ghem	6	6
WC	(Mexico) L Gómez	3	2
Q	(El Salvador) M Arévalo	6^{1}	6	6
5	(Italy) M Donati	7^{7}	4	3

Quarterfinals
(Italy) F Gaio	6	6
7	(Chile) H Podlipnik	4	1
3	(Brazil) A Ghem	3	6^{5}
Q	(El Salvador) M Arévalo	6	7^{7}

Semifinals
(Italy) F Gaio	1	4
Q	(El Salvador) M Arévalo	6	6

=== Bottom half ===
First round
6	(France) M Bourgue	5	6	6
Alt	(Colombia) N Barrientos	7	2	0
(Serbia) P Krstin	6	6
WC	(Mexico) T Hank	3	4
Q	(Czech Republic) Robin Staněk	6	6
(Spain) R Ramírez Hidalgo	3	4
Q	(Brazil) C Zampieri	6	1	7
4	(Spain) A Menéndez Maceiras	1	6	5
8	(Republic of Ireland) J McGee	4	2
(Egypt) M Safwat	6	6
(Ecuador) G Lapentti	4	3
(Italy) L Giustino	6	6
Q	(Argentina) A Velotti	5	6	0
(Serbia) L Djere	7	3	6
(Argentina) P Cachin	7	3	6^{5}
2	(Spain) A Montañés	5	6	7^{7}

Second round
6	(France) M Bourgue	3	4
(Serbia) P Krstin	6	6
Q	(Czech Republic) R Staněk	3	1
Q	(Brazil) C Zampieri	6	6
(Egypt) M Safwat	7^{9}	6
(Italy) L Giustino	6^{7}	4
(Serbia) L Djere	5	6^{5}
2	(Spain) A Montañés	7	7^{7}

Quarterfinals
(Serbia) P Krstin	7^{7}	6
Q	(Brazil) C Zampieri	6^{4}	3
(Egypt) M Safwat	6	2	6^{5}
2	(Spain) A Montañés	4	6	7^{7}

Semifinals
(Serbia) P Krstin	6	6
2	(Spain) A Montañés	2	4
