= 2017 Antonio Savoldi–Marco Cò – Trofeo Dimmidisì – Doubles =

Marco Cò – Trofeo Dimmidisì – Doubles
- 2017 Antonio Savoldi–Marco Cò – Trofeo Dimmidisì

Final
- Champions: (Monaco) Romain Arneodo (France) Hugo Nys
- Runners-up: (Russia) Mikhail Elgin (Czech Republic) Roman Jebavý
- Score: 4–6, 7–6^{(7–3)}, [10–5]

Events
Singles	Doubles
← 2016 ·	Antonio Savoldi–Marco Cò – Trofeo Dimmidisì	· 2019 →

Nikola Mektić and Antonio Šančić were the defending champions but chose not to defend their title.

Romain Arneodo and Hugo Nys won the title after defeating Mikhail Elgin and Roman Jebavý 4–6, 7–6^{(7–3)}, [10–5] in the final.

== Seeds ==
1. (Russia) Mikhail Elgin / (Czech Republic) Roman Jebavý (final)
2. (Uruguay) Ariel Behar / (United Kingdom) Joe Salisbury (semifinals)
3. (Sweden) Johan Brunström / (India) Jeevan Nedunchezhiyan (quarterfinals)
4. (Belgium) Sander Gillé / (Belgium) Joran Vliegen (first round)

== Draw ==
=== Key ===
- Q = Qualifier
- WC = Wild card
- LL = Lucky loser
- Alt = Alternate
- SE = Special exempt
- PR = Protected ranking
- ITF = ITF entry
- JE = Junior exempt
- w/o = Walkover
- r = Retired
- d = Defaulted
- SR = Special ranking

First round
1	(Russia) M Elgin (Czech Republic) R Jebavý	2	6	[10]
(Croatia) M Draganja (Croatia) T Draganja	6	4	[8]
(Italy) J Ocleppo (Italy) A Vavassori	6	6
WC	(Italy) G Mager (Italy) A Pellegrino	3	4
4	(Belgium) S Gillé (Belgium) J Vliegen	2	4
(Canada) S Diez (Spain) D Vega Hernández	6	6
(Austria) L Miedler (Netherlands) D Pel	6	7
(Turkey) T Altuna (Italy) A Motti	3	5
(France) S Doumbia (Germany) A Mies	6	5	[2]
(Monaco) R Arneodo (France) H Nys	2	7	[10]
(Poland) K Majchrzak (Poland) G Panfil	2	4
3	(Sweden) J Brunström (India) J Nedunchezhiyan	6	6
WC	(Italy) F Cipolla (Italy) M Donati	7^{7}	4	[7]
(Austria) M Neuchrist (Austria) T-S Weissborn	6^{5}	6	[10]
WC	(Italy) Andrea Agazzi (Italy) Davide Pontoglio	2	5
2	(Uruguay) A Behar (United Kingdom) J Salisbury	6	7

Quarterfinals
1	(Russia) M Elgin (Czech Republic) R Jebavý	6	7
(Italy) J Ocleppo (Italy) A Vavassori	4	5
(Canada) S Diez (Spain) D Vega Hernández	1	7^{7}	[4]
(Austria) L Miedler (Netherlands) D Pel	6	6^{2}	[10]
(Monaco) R Arneodo (France) H Nys	6	7
3	(Sweden) J Brunström (India) J Nedunchezhiyan	2	5
(Austria) M Neuchrist (Austria) T-S Weissborn	6	1	[14]
2	(Uruguay) A Behar (United Kingdom) J Salisbury	3	6	[16]

Semifinals
1	(Russia) M Elgin (Czech Republic) R Jebavý	6	4	[10]
(Austria) L Miedler (Netherlands) D Pel	2	6	[2]
(Monaco) R Arneodo (France) H Nys	1	6	[18]
2	(Uruguay) A Behar (United Kingdom) J Salisbury	6	2	[16]

Final
1	(Russia) M Elgin (Czech Republic) R Jebavý	6	6^{3}	[5]
(Monaco) R Arneodo (France) H Nys	4	7^{7}	[10]
