= 2017 Antonio Savoldi–Marco Cò – Trofeo Dimmidisì – Singles =

Marco Cò – Trofeo Dimmidisì – Singles
- 2017 Antonio Savoldi–Marco Cò – Trofeo Dimmidisì

Final
- Champion: (Spain) Roberto Carballés Baena
- Runner-up: (Spain) Guillermo García López
- Score: 6–4, 2–6, 6–2

Events
Singles	Doubles
← 2016 ·	Antonio Savoldi–Marco Cò – Trofeo Dimmidisì	· 2019 →

Leonardo Mayer was the defending champion but chose not to defend his title.

Roberto Carballés Baena won the title after defeating Guillermo García López 6–4, 2–6, 6–2 in the final.

== Seeds ==
1. (Spain) Guillermo García López (final)
2. (Czech Republic) Adam Pavlásek (quarterfinals)
3. (Spain) Roberto Carballés Baena (champion)
4. (Belgium) Arthur De Greef (second round)
5. (Germany) Oscar Otte (quarterfinals)
6. (France) Mathias Bourgue (second round)
7. (Spain) Tommy Robredo (semifinals)
8. (Spain) Ricardo Ojeda Lara (second round)

== Draw ==
=== Key ===
- Q = Qualifier
- WC = Wild card
- LL = Lucky loser
- Alt = Alternate
- SE = Special exempt
- PR = Protected ranking
- ITF = ITF entry
- JE = Junior exempt
- w/o = Walkover
- r = Retired
- d = Defaulted
- SR = Special ranking

=== Finals ===
Semifinals
1	(Spain) Guillermo García López	6	3	6
SE	(Sweden) Elias Ymer	4	6	4
3	(Spain) Roberto Carballés Baena	6	6
7	(Spain) Tommy Robredo	4	3

Final
1	(Spain) Guillermo García López	4	6	2
3	(Spain) Roberto Carballés Baena	6	2	6

=== Top half ===
First round
1	(Spain) G García López	6	6
LL	(Austria) Lenny Hampel	4	3
(Italy) A Arnaboldi	4	3
(Serbia) D Petrović	6	6
(Canada) S Diez	6	4	6
(Italy) M Donati	3	6	1
(France) S Doumbia	2	4
5	(Germany) O Otte	6	6
4	(Belgium) A De Greef	6	6
Q	(Italy) F Gaio	3	4
WC	(Italy) J Ocleppo	6^{4}	3
(Spain) C Taberner	7^{7}	6
SE	(Sweden) E Ymer	6	6
(Poland) K Majchrzak	3	4
(France) A Müller	2	0^{r}
8	(Spain) R Ojeda Lara	6	0

Second round
1	(Spain) G García López	6	1	6
(Serbia) D Petrović	4	6	3
(Canada) S Diez	2	1
5	(Germany) O Otte	6	6
4	(Belgium) A De Greef	6^{6}	6	1
(Spain) C Taberner	7^{8}	3	6
SE	(Sweden) E Ymer	6	6
8	(Spain) R Ojeda Lara	2	1

Quarterfinals
1	(Spain) G García López	7^{7}	6
5	(Germany) O Otte	6^{3}	0
(Spain) C Taberner	6^{5}	5
SE	(Sweden) E Ymer	7^{7}	7

Semifinals
1	(Spain) G García López	6	3	6
SE	(Sweden) E Ymer	4	6	4

=== Bottom half ===
First round
6	(France) M Bourgue	6	6
(Italy) M Viola	3	4
Q	(Italy) L Sonego	7^{7}	6
WC	(Italy) A Pellegrino	6^{4}	2
WC	(Italy) G Quinzi	4	6	6
(Spain) B Zapata Miralles	6	4	1
Alt	(Serbia) M Zekić	5	6	3
3	(Spain) R Carballés Baena	7	4	6
7	(Spain) T Robredo	6	7^{7}
Q	(Italy) G Mager	3	6^{3}
WC	(Italy) A Vavassori	5	3
(Belgium) K Coppejans	7	6
(France) T Lamasine	4	2
(Czech Republic) Marek Jaloviec	6	6
Q	(Austria) M Neuchrist	6	1	4
2	(Czech Republic) A Pavlásek	1	6	6

Second round
6	(France) M Bourgue	3	3
Q	(Italy) L Sonego	6	6
WC	(Italy) G Quinzi	5	3
3	(Spain) R Carballés Baena	7	6
7	(Spain) T Robredo	6	6
(Belgium) K Coppejans	1	1
(Czech Republic) M Jaloviec	0	2
2	(Czech Republic) A Pavlásek	6	6

Quarterfinals
Q	(Italy) L Sonego	7	2	4
3	(Spain) R Carballés Baena	5	6	6
7	(Spain) T Robredo	6	6
2	(Czech Republic) A Pavlásek	4	2

Semifinals
3	(Spain) R Carballés Baena	6	6
7	(Spain) T Robredo	4	3
