= 2016 San Luis Open Challenger Tour – Doubles =

Tennis tournament in Mexico

Doubles
- 2016 San Luis Open Challenger Tour

Final
- Champions: (New Zealand) Marcus Daniell (New Zealand) Artem Sitak
- Runners-up: (Mexico) Santiago González (Croatia) Mate Pavić
- Score: 6–3, 7–6^{(7–4)}

Events
| Singles | Doubles |
- San Luis Open Challenger Tour

Guillermo Durán and Horacio Zeballos were the defending champions but chose not to participate.

Marcus Daniell and Artem Sitak won the title, defeating Santiago González and Mate Pavić 6–3, 7–6^{(7–4)} in the final.

== Seeds ==
1. (Mexico) Santiago González / (Croatia) Mate Pavić (final)
2. (Chile) Julio Peralta / (Chile) Hans Podlipnik-Castillo (semifinals)
3. (New Zealand) Marcus Daniell / (New Zealand) Artem Sitak (champions)
4. (Peru) Sergio Galdós / (Argentina) Andrés Molteni (semifinals)

== Draw ==
Key

- Q = Qualifier
- WC = Wild card
- LL = Lucky loser
- Alt = Alternate
- ITF = ITF entry
- PR = Protected ranking
- SR = Special ranking
- SE = Special exempt
- JE = Junior exempt
- JR = Junior Accelerator Programme entrant
- CO = College Accelerator Programme entrant
- NG = Next Gen Accelerator Program entrant
- w/o = Walkover
- r = Retired
- d = Defaulted

First round
1 | (Mexico) S González (Croatia) M Pavić | 3 | 6 | [10]
(Brazil) A Ghem (Brazil) F Neis | 6 | 3 | [8]
(Uruguay) A Behar (Italy) A Motti | 2 | 7^{7} | [5]
(El Salvador) M Arévalo (Colombia) N Barrientos | 6 | 6^{4} | [10]
4 | (Peru) S Galdós (Argentina) A Molteni | 7 | 6
(Venezuela) LD Martínez (India) D Sharan | 5 | 4
(Spain) O Roca Batalla (Spain) J Samper-Montaña | 6 | 6
WC | (Mexico) Mauricio Astorga (Mexico) M Sánchez | 4 | 2
(South Africa) D O'Brien (Mexico) MÁ Reyes-Varela | 7^{7} | 2 | [10]
WC | (Mexico) H Hach Verdugo (Mexico) L Patiño | 6^{3} | 6 | [5]
(Italy) F Gaio (Austria) D Novak | 1 | 6^{5}
3 | (New Zealand) M Daniell (New Zealand) A Sitak | 6 | 7^{7}
(India) P Raja (South Africa) R Roelofse | 7 | 6^{9} | [10]
WC | (Mexico) D Garza (Mexico) T Hank | 5 | 7^{11} | [4]
(Spain) A Menéndez-Maceiras (Spain) R Ramírez Hidalgo | 4 | 6 | [8]
2 | (Chile) J Peralta (Chile) H Podlipnik-Castillo | 6 | 4 | [10]

Quarterfinals
1 | (Mexico) S González (Croatia) M Pavić | 6 | 6
(El Salvador) M Arévalo (Colombia) N Barrientos | 4 | 3
4 | (Peru) S Galdós (Argentina) A Molteni | 6 | 7^{7}
(Spain) O Roca Batalla (Spain) J Samper-Montaña | 3 | 6^{5}
(South Africa) D O'Brien (Mexico) MÁ Reyes-Varela | 6 | 6^{6} | [4]
3 | (New Zealand) M Daniell (New Zealand) A Sitak | 4 | 7^{8} | [10]
(India) P Raja (South Africa) R Roelofse | 7^{7} | 6^{5} | [7]
2 | (Chile) J Peralta (Chile) H Podlipnik-Castillo | 6^{5} | 7^{7} | [10]

Semifinals
1 | (Mexico) S González (Croatia) M Pavić | 3 | 6 | [10]
4 | (Peru) S Galdós (Argentina) A Molteni | 6 | 3 | [8]
3 | (New Zealand) M Daniell (New Zealand) A Sitak | 5 | 7^{7} | [10]
2 | (Chile) J Peralta (Chile) H Podlipnik-Castillo | 7 | 6^{2} | [5]

Final
1 | (Mexico) S González (Croatia) M Pavić | 3 | 6^{4}
3 | (New Zealand) M Daniell (New Zealand) A Sitak | 6 | 7^{7}
