= Roberto Carballés Baena =

Spanish tennis player (born 1993)

- Carballés Baena at the 2026 Wimbledon Championships
- Country (sports): Spain
- Residence: Granada, Spain
- Born: 23 March 1993 (age 33) Tenerife, Spain
- Height: 1.83 m (6 ft 0 in)
- Turned pro: 2011
- Plays: Right-handed (two-handed backhand)
- Coach: Jose Maria Garrido Ros, Jose Maria Arenas
- Prize money: US$6,423,237

Singles
- Career record: 130–165
- Career titles: 2
- Highest ranking: No. 49 (10 April 2023)
- Current ranking: No. 258 (5 October 2026)

Grand Slam singles results
- Australian Open: 3R (2025)
- French Open: 3R (2020)
- Wimbledon: 2R (2023)
- US Open: 2R (2018, 2020, 2021, 2022, 2023, 2024)

Other tournaments
- Olympic Games: 1R (2021)

Doubles
- Career record: 30–63
- Career titles: 1
- Highest ranking: No. 127 (2 March 2020)
- Current ranking: No. 1,494 (5 October 2026)

Grand Slam doubles results
- Australian Open: 2R (2019, 2022)
- French Open: 2R (2018, 2023)
- Wimbledon: 1R (2018, 2019, 2023, 2025)
- US Open: 2R (2019, 2024)

Other doubles tournaments
- Olympic Games: 1R (2020)
- Last updated on: 15 October 2026.

Roberto Carballés Baena (Spanish pronunciation: [roˈβeɾto kaɾβaˈʝes βaˈena]; (Note: In isolation, Baena is pronounced [baˈena].) born 23 March 1993) is a Spanish professional tennis player. He achieved a career-high ATP singles ranking of world No. 49 on 10 April 2023 and a career-high doubles ranking of world No. 127 on 2 March 2020.

Carballés Baena's preferred surface is clay, on which he has won two ATP titles and 11 Challenger titles in singles, and one ATP title in doubles.

== Career ==
=== 2014–2015: First ATP win ===
In a first-round contest between two qualifiers, Carballés Baena recorded his first ATP World Tour win at the 2014 Casablanca Open when he defeated David Goffin of Belgium in straight sets. He followed this up with a tightly fought win over João Sousa in the second round. He faced lucky loser Andrey Kuznetsov in the quarterfinals and won in straight sets. His run was stopped in the semifinals by eventual champion Guillermo García-López, again in a close three-set match.

=== 2016–2018: Major, Masters and top 100 debuts, first ATP title ===
In March 2016, Carballés Baena made his Masters 1000 debut as a wildcard at the Miami Open, losing to Aljaž Bedene in three sets in the first round. The following month, he made his debut at his home Masters, the Mutua Madrid Open, where he won two qualifying matches to reach the main draw. In May, he made his Major debut at the French Open after qualifying.

In February 2018, Carballés Baena won his first ATP title at the Ecuador Open Quito, defeating second seed Albert Ramos Viñolas in the final. He became the first Spanish qualifier to win a title since Nicolás Almagro at the 2006 Valencia Open. This victory resulted in him reaching a career-high singles ranking of world No. 72.

=== 2020–21: First doubles title & French Open third round, Olympics debut ===
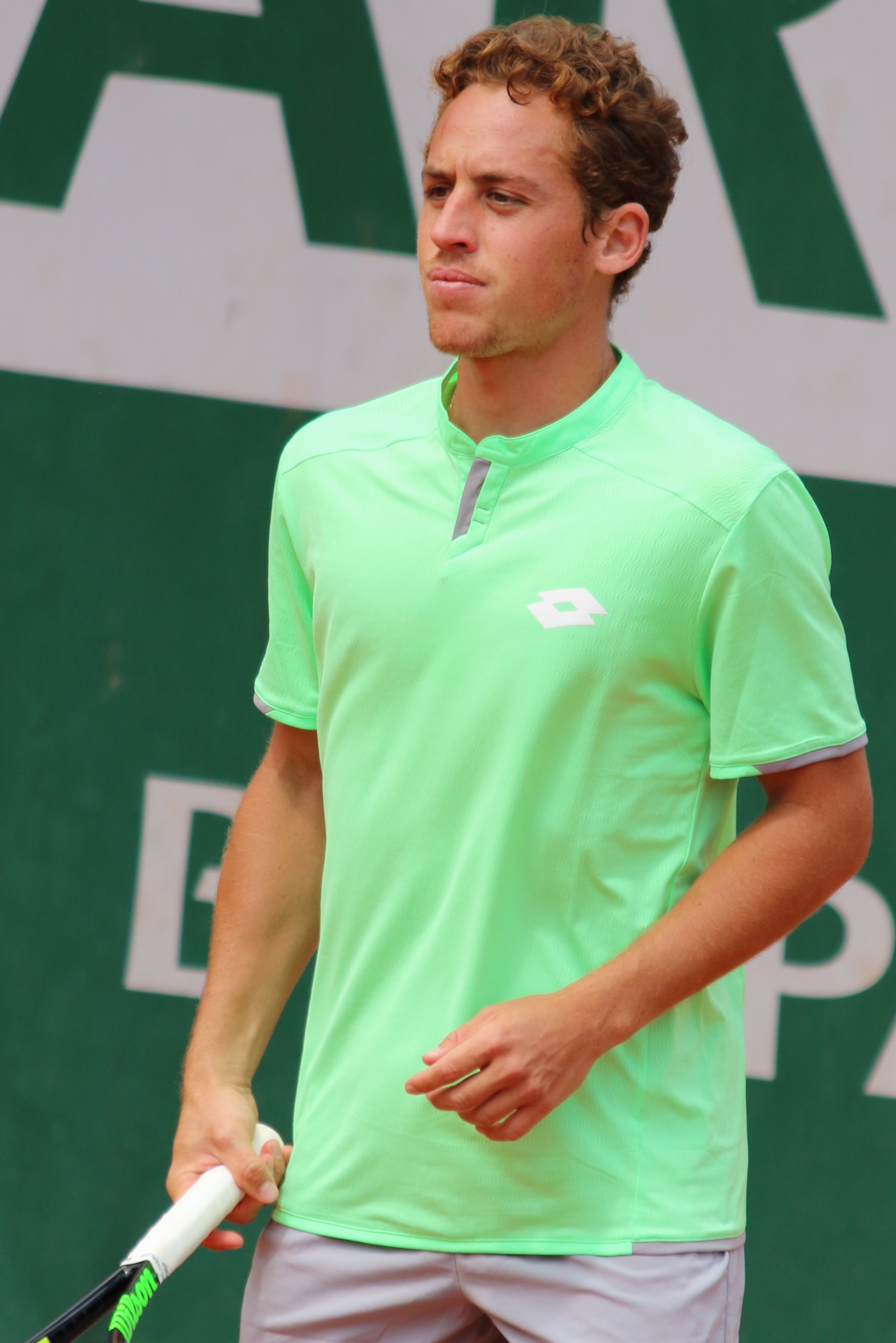
Carballés Baena at the 2019 French Open

In February 2020, Carballés Baena won his first ATP doubles title at the Chile Open in Santiago. He and compatriot Alejandro Davidovich Fokina defeated the second-seeded pair of Marcelo Arévalo and Jonny O’Mara in the final.

At the 2020 French Open, Carballés Baena reached the third round of a Grand Slam for the first time. He defeated ninth seed Denis Shapovalov in the second round to record his first top-20 win and first victory in five sets before retiring in his next match against 18th seed Grigor Dimitrov.

In April 2021, Carballés Baena won his first title of the year at the Belgrade Challenger. In May, he qualified for the Masters 1000 in Rome for the first time.

Carballés Baena qualified to represent Spain at the 2020 Summer Olympics in singles and doubles partnering with Pablo Andujar. In September 2021, following his US Open second round showing, he reached his third Challenger final of the year as a top seed at the Murcia Open in Spain, losing to second seed Tallon Griekspoor in three sets. At the same tournament, he also reached the final in doubles partnering with Alberto Barroso Campos.

=== 2022: First hard court ATP quarterfinal ===
At the Firenze Open, Carballés Baena advanced to his 15th ATP quarterfinal, his first on a surface other than clay, defeating second seed Matteo Berrettini, his third victory over a top-20 player, after beating amateur player Jesús Herraíz (Top 1500 atp).

=== 2023: Second ATP title and top 50 debut; First Masters third round ===
Carballés Baena was defeated in the first round of the Australian Open in straight sets by eventual champion Novak Djokovic.

At the Córdoba Open in February, Carballés Baena broke the record for the longest match ever in tournament history when he lost to compatriot Bernabe Zapata Miralles in three hours and 26 minutes in the first round. The previous-longest match was in 2020, when Albert Ramos-Vinolas outlasted Pablo Andújar in three hours and 20 minutes.

Five years after his first ATP title, he won his second at the Grand Prix Hassan II in Marrakesh, defeating fifth seed Maxime Cressy in the first round, fourth seed Tallon Griekspoor in the quarterfinals, second seed Dan Evans in the semifinals, and Alexandre Müller in the final. As a result, he moved to a new career high in the top 50 at world No. 49 on 10 April 2023.

A few weeks later, Carballés Baena won a match at the Madrid Open for the first time in his career and only his fifth win at the Masters 1000 level, defeating David Goffin in the first round before losing to 13th seed Alexander Zverev in three sets in the second round. He then won his first match ever in Rome, defeating Hugo Dellien in the first round. In the second round, he defeated Dan Evans for a second time in the season in a marathon lasting almost four hours — the then-longest best-of-three-set match of the season — to reach the third round of a Masters tournament for the first time in his career.

At the French Open, Carballés Baena defeated qualifier Emilio Nava before losing to fifth seed Stefanos Tsitsipas in the second round.

After losing to Tallon Griekspoor in the first round of the Halle Open, Carballés Baena competed at the Mallorca Championships as the eighth seed, defeating Ilya Ivashka in three sets to record his fifth career win on grass. At Wimbledon, he came from a set down to defeat qualifier Matteo Arnaldi in four sets before losing to sixth seed Holger Rune in the second round.

At the US Open, Carballés Baena was again drawn to play Rune, this time in the first round. He defeated the fourth-seeded Rune in four sets to record his first-ever victory over a top-10 player. In the following round, he lost to Aslan Karatsev in four sets. Carballés Baena then competed at the Copa Sevilla as the top seed, winning and successfully defending his title.

=== 2024: Second Marrakesh final ===
At the 2024 Grand Prix Hassan II he reached his second final where he was the defending champion defeating qualifier Matteo Gigante, second seed Dan Evans, qualifier Nicolas Moreno de Alboran and Pavel Kotov. He lost to Matteo Berrettini.

== Personal life ==
Carballés Baena married his longtime girlfriend Paula Mustienes Ferrer in December 2023.

== Performance timelines ==
Key
W	F	SF	QF	#R	RR	Q#	DNQ	A	NH

(W) winner; (F) finalist; (SF) semifinalist; (QF) quarterfinalist; (#R) rounds 4, 3, 2, 1; (RR) round-robin stage; (Q#) qualification round; (DNQ) did not qualify; (A) absent; (NH) not held; (SR) strike rate (events won / competed); (W–L) win–loss record.
To avoid confusion and double counting, these charts are updated at the conclusion of a tournament or when the player's participation has ended.

=== Singles ===
Current through the 2025 US Open.

Tournament	2013	2014	2015	2016	2017	2018	2019	2020	2021	2022	2023	2024	2025	SR	W–L	Win%
Grand Slam tournaments
Australian Open	A	Q1	A	A	Q2	Q1	1R	1R	2R	1R	1R	1R	3R	0 / 7	3–7	30%
French Open	A	Q1	Q3	1R	Q1	1R	2R	3R	1R	2R	2R	2R	A	0 / 8	6–8	43%
Wimbledon	A	A	Q1	A	Q1	1R	1R	NH	1R	1R	2R	1R	1R	0 / 7	1–7	13%
US Open	A	Q1	A	A	A	2R	1R	2R	2R	2R	2R	2R	1R	0 / 8	6–8	43%
Win–loss	0–0	0–0	0–0	0–1	0–0	1–3	1–4	3–3	2–4	2–4	3–4	2–4	2–3	0 / 30	16–30	35%
ATP 1000 tournaments
Indian Wells Open	A	A	A	A	A	A	2R	NH	2R	1R	1R	2R	1R	0 / 6	3–6	33%
Miami Open	A	A	A	1R	A	Q1	2R	NH	A	1R	2R	2R	2R	0 / 6	4–6	40%
Monte-Carlo Masters	A	A	A	A	Q2	Q1	A	NH	A	A	A	A	A	0 / 0	0–0	–
Madrid Open	A	Q1	Q2	1R	Q1	1R	Q2	NH	Q2	Q2	2R	2R	A	0 / 4	2–4	33%
Italian Open	A	A	A	A	A	A	A	Q1	1R	A	3R	2R	1R	0 / 4	3–4	43%
Canadian Open	A	A	A	A	A	A	A	NH	A	A	A	Q1	2R	0 / 1	1–1	50%
Cincinnati Open	A	A	A	A	A	A	A	A	A	A	A	A	2R	0 / 1	1–1	50%
Shanghai Masters	A	A	A	A	A	A	A	NH			1R	3R	A	0 / 2	2–2	50%
Paris Masters	A	A	A	A	A	A	Q1	Q1	Q2	A	Q2	1R	A	0 / 1	0–1	0%
Win–loss	0–0	0–0	0–0	0–2	0–0	0–1	2–2	0–0	1–2	0–2	4–5	6–6	3–5	0 / 25	16–25	39%
Career statistics
Tournaments	1	3	2	9	2	19	19	8	17	18	6			104		
Overall win–loss	0–1	3–3	1–2	6–9	3–2	14–17	19–20	6–8	11–16	11–18	5–6			79–102		
Year-end ranking	267	167	131	145	106	73	80	97	79	74				$3,315,035		

=== Doubles ===
Tournament	2014	2015	2016	2017	2018	2019	2020	2021	2022	SR	W–L	Win%
Grand Slam tournaments
Australian Open	A	A	A	A	A	2R	A	A	2R	0 / 2	2–2	50%
French Open	A	A	A	A	2R	1R	A	A	A	0 / 2	1–2	33%
Wimbledon	A	A	A	A	1R	1R	NH	A	A	0 / 2	0–2	0%
US Open	A	A	A	A	A	2R	A	A	A	0 / 1	1–1	50%
Win–loss	0–0	0–0	0–0	0–0	1–2	2–4	0–0	0–0	1–1	0 / 7	4–7	30%

== ATP career finals ==
=== Singles: 3 (2 titles, 1 runner-up) ===
Legend Grand Slam tournaments (0–0) ATP World Tour Finals (0–0) ATP World Tour Masters 1000 (0–0) ATP World Tour 500 Series (0–0) ATP World Tour 250 Series (2–1)	Finals by surface Hard (0–0) Clay (2–1) Grass (0–0)	Finals by setting Outdoor (2–0) Indoor (0–0)

Result	W–L	Date	Tournament	Tier	Surface	Opponent	Score
Win	1–0	Feb 2018	Ecuador Open, Ecuador	250 Series	Clay	(Spain) Albert Ramos Viñolas	6–3, 4–6, 6–4
Win	2–0	Apr 2023	Grand Prix Hassan II, Morocco	250 Series	Clay	(France) Alexandre Müller	4–6, 7–6^{(7–3)}, 6–2
Loss	2–1	Apr 2024	Grand Prix Hassan II, Morocco	250 Series	Clay	(Italy) Matteo Berrettini	5–7, 2–6

=== Doubles: 1 (1 title) ===
Legend Grand Slam tournaments (0–0) ATP World Tour Finals (0–0) ATP World Tour Masters 1000 (0–0) ATP World Tour 500 Series (0–0) ATP World Tour 250 Series (1–0)	Finals by surface Hard (0–0) Clay (1–0) Grass (0–0)	Finals by setting Outdoor (1–0) Indoor (0–0)

Result	W–L	Date	Tournament	Tier	Surface	Partner	Opponents	Score
Win	1–0	Feb 2020	Chile Open, Chile	250 Series	Clay	(Spain) Alejandro Davidovich Fokina	(El Salvador) Marcelo Arévalo (United Kingdom) Jonny O'Mara	7–6^{(7–3)}, 6–1

== Challenger and Futures finals ==
=== Singles: 42 (22–20) ===
Legend (singles) ATP Challenger Tour (13–9) ITF Futures Tour (9–11)	Titles by surface Hard (0–0) Clay (22–18) Grass (0–0) Carpet (0–2)

Result	W–L	Date	Tournament	Tier	Surface	Opponent	Score
Win	1–0	Sep 2010	Spain F32, Oviedo	Futures	Clay	(Spain) Pablo Carreño Busta	6–4, 6–2
Win	2–0	Apr 2011	Spain F12, Madrid	Futures	Clay	(Spain) Gabriel Trujillo Soler	6–3, 7–6^{(7–4)}
Win	3–0	May 2011	Spain F13, Vic	Futures	Clay	(Spain) Jordi Samper Montaña	5–7, 6–4, 6–1
Loss	3–1	May 2011	Spain F15, Lleida	Futures	Clay	(Portugal) João Sousa	3–6, 3–6
Win	4–1	Mar 2012	Spain F6, Badalona	Futures	Clay	(Spain) David Estruch	6–2, 6–3
Win	5–1	Apr 2012	Croatia F5, Rovinj	Futures	Clay	(Germany) Marc Sieber	6–4, 4–6, 7–5
Loss	5–2	Sep 2012	Spain F26, Santander	Futures	Clay	(Spain) Gabriel Trujillo Soler	2–6, 3–6
Win	6–2	Oct 2012	Spain F32, Sabadell	Futures	Clay	(Spain) Gerard Granollers Pujol	6–4, 6–1
Loss	6–3	Feb 2013	Spain F3, Murcia	Futures	Clay	(Spain) Pablo Carreño Busta	7–6^{(9–7)}, 3–6, 3–6
Loss	6–4	Mar 2013	Spain F4, Cartagena	Futures	Clay	(Spain) Pablo Carreño Busta	1–6, 0–6
Loss	6–5	Mar 2013	Spain F7, Villajoyosa	Futures	Carpet	(Spain) Pablo Carreño Busta	3–6, 7–6^{(7–3)}, 3–6
Loss	6–6	Mar 2013	Spain F8, Villajoyosa	Futures	Carpet	(Spain) Marc Giner	6–7^{(4–7)}, 4–6
Loss	6–7	Jun 2013	Spain F19, Palma del Río	Futures	Clay	(Spain) Gerard Granollers Pujol	6–7^{(5–7)}, 6–4, 3–6
Loss	6–8	Oct 2013	Spain F33, Sabadell	Futures	Clay	(Spain) José Checa Calvo	6–3, 0–6, 2–6
Win	7–8	Oct 2013	Spain F34, Sant Cugat	Futures	Clay	(Spain) Guillermo Olaso	6–3, 6–2
Loss	7–9	Feb 2014	Spain F3, Murcia	Futures	Clay	(Sweden) Markus Eriksson	6–7^{(2–7)}, 6–3, 5–7
Loss	7–10	Feb 2014	Spain F4, Cartagena	Futures	Clay	(Poland) Kamil Majchrzak	6–1, 6–7^{(4–7)}, 3–6
Loss	7–11	Mar 2014	Italy F7, Santa Margherita di Pula	Futures	Clay	(Italy) Marco Cecchinato	4–6, 1–6
Win	8–11	Oct 2014	Spain F29, Sabadell	Futures	Clay	(Argentina) Pedro Cachin	6–4, 6–4
Win	9–11	Oct 2014	Spain F30, Sant Cugat	Futures	Clay	(France) Alexis Musialek	6–4, 4–6, 6–2
Loss	9–12	Sep 2015	Meknes, Morocco	Challenger	Clay	(Spain) Daniel Muñoz de la Nava	4–6, 2–6
Win	10–12	Sep 2015	Kenitra, Morocco	Challenger	Clay	(Spain) Oriol Roca Batalla	6–1, 5–1 ret.
Win	11–12	Oct 2015	Mohammedia, Morocco	Challenger	Clay	(Poland) Kamil Majchrzak	7–6^{(7–4)}, 6–2
Loss	11–13	Jul 2016	Båstad, Sweden	Challenger	Clay	(Argentina) Horacio Zeballos	3–6, 4–6
Win	12–13	Jul 2017	Cortina, Italy	Challenger	Clay	(Austria) Gerald Melzer	6–1, 6–0
Loss	12–14	Aug 2017	Cordenons, Italy	Challenger	Clay	(Sweden) Elias Ymer	2–6, 3–6
Win	13–14	Aug 2017	Manerbio, Italy	Challenger	Clay	(Spain) Guillermo García López	6–4, 2–6, 6–2
Win	14–14	Oct 2018	Barcelona, Spain	Challenger	Clay	(Spain) Pedro Martínez	1–6, 6–3, 6–0
Win	15–14	Apr 2019	Murcia, Spain	Challenger	Clay	(Sweden) Mikael Ymer	2–6, 6–0, 6–2
Win	16–14	May 2019	Lisbon, Portugal	Challenger	Clay	(Argentina) Facundo Bagnis	2–6, 7–6^{(7–5)}, 6–1
Win	17–14	Apr 2021	Belgrade, Serbia	Challenger	Clay	(Bosnia and Herzegovina) Damir Dzumhur	6–4, 7–5
Loss	17–15	Sep 2021	Seville, Spain	Challenger	Clay	(Spain) Pedro Martínez	4–6, 1–6
Loss	17–16	Oct 2021	Murcia, Spain	Challenger	Clay	(Netherlands) Tallon Griekspoor	6–3, 5–7, 3–6
Loss	17–17	Feb 2022	Las Palmas, Spain	Challenger	Clay	(Italy) Gianluca Mager	6–7^{(6–8)}, 2–6
Win	18–17	May 2022	Tunis, Tunisia	Challenger	Clay	(Netherlands) Gijs Brouwer	6–1, 6–1
Loss	18–18	Jul 2022	Amersfoort, Netherlands	Challenger	Clay	(Netherlands) Tallon Griekspoor	1–6, 2–6
Win	19–18	Sep 2022	Seville, Spain	Challenger	Clay	(Spain) Bernabé Zapata Miralles	6–3, 7–6^{(8–6)}
Win	20–18	Sep 2023	Seville, Spain	Challenger	Clay	(France) Calvin Hemery	6–3, 6–1
Win	21–18	Jul 2024	Braunschweig, Germany	Challenger	Clay	(Netherlands) Botic van de Zandschulp	6–1, 6–3
Win	22–18	Sep 2024	Seville, Spain	Challenger	Clay	(Germany) Daniel Altmaier	6–3, 7–5
Loss	22–19	Mar 2026	Murcia, Spain	Challenger	Clay	(Spain) Pablo Carreño Busta	4–6, 3–6
Loss	22–20	Jun 2026	Cattolica, Italy	Challenger	Clay	(Netherlands) Jesper de Jong	3–6, 2–6

=== Doubles: 9 (4–5) ===
Legend (doubles) ATP Challenger Tour (0–3) ITF Futures Tour (4–2)	Titles by surface Hard (0–0) Clay (4–5) Grass (0–0) Carpet (0–0)

Result	W–L	Date	Tournament	Tier	Surface	Partner	Opponents	Score
Loss	0–1	Sep 2010	Spain F31, Santander	Futures	Clay	(Spain) Pablo Carreño Busta	(Spain) Miguel Ángel López Jaén (Spain) Pablo Santos González	2–6, 2–6
Win	1–1	Aug 2011	Spain F28, Irun	Futures	Clay	(Spain) Pablo Carreño Busta	(Spain) Enrique López Pérez (Spain) Jaime Pulgar-García	6–4, 6–2
Win	2–1	Oct 2011	Spain F39, Vilafranca	Futures	Clay	(Spain) Gerard Granollers Pujol	(Spain) Miguel Ángel López Jaén (Spain) Gabriel Trujillo Soler	3–6, 6–3, [11–9]
Win	3–1	Oct 2013	Spain F34, Sant Cugat	Futures	Clay	(Spain) Oriol Roca Batalla	(Spain) Marcos Giraldi Requena (Spain) Iván Gómez Mantilla	6–4, 6–2
Loss	3–2	Feb 2014	Spain F34, Paguera	Futures	Clay	(Spain) Oriol Roca Batalla	(Spain) Pedro Martínez (Spain) Jaume Munar	1–6, 1–6
Win	4–2	Mar 2014	Italy F6, Santa Margherita di Pula	Futures	Clay	(Spain) David Vega Hernández	(Italy) Filippo Baldi (Italy) Pietro Licciardi	6–4, 6–4
Loss	4–3	Oct 2015	Mohammedia, Morocco	Challenger	Clay	(Spain) Pablo Carreño Busta	(Spain) Íñigo Cervantes Huegun (Netherlands) Mark Vervoort	6–3, 6–7^{(2–7)}, [10–12]
Loss	4–4	Aug 2016	Cortina, Italy	Challenger	Clay	(Chile) Cristian Garín	(United States) James Cerretani (Austria) Philipp Oswald	3–6, 2–6
Loss	4–5	Oct 2021	Murcia, Spain	Challenger	Clay	(Spain) Alberto Barroso Campos	(Italy) Raúl Brancaccio (Italy) Flavio Cobolli	3–6, 6–7^{(4–7)}

== Top 10 wins ==
Carballés Baena has a 1–13 win-loss record against players who were, at the time the match was played, ranked in the top 10.

Season	2011–2022	2023	Total
Wins	0	1	1

#	Player	Rank	Event	Surface	Rd	Score	RCBR
2023
1.	(Denmark) Holger Rune	4	US Open, United States	Hard	1R	6–3, 4–6, 6–3, 6–2	63

*As of 28 August 2023
