= Marcus Daniell =

New Zealand tennis player (born 1989)

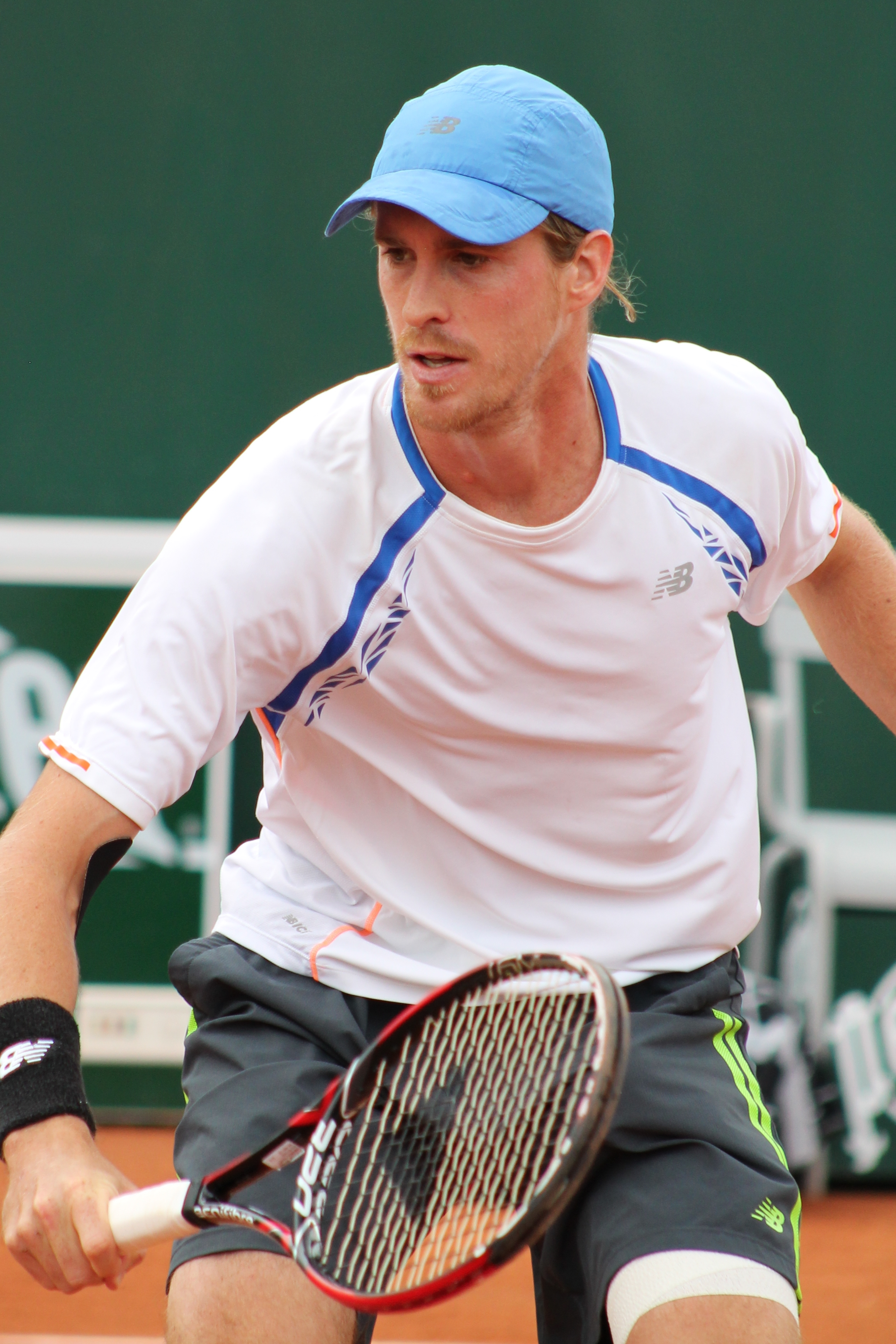
- Daniell in 2015
- Country (sports): New Zealand
- Residence: New York, NY, USA
- Born: 9 November 1989 (age 37) Masterton, New Zealand
- Height: 1.90 m (6 ft 3 in)
- Turned pro: 2008
- Retired: 7 January 2025
- Plays: Right-handed (two-handed backhand)
- Coach: David Sammel, Ian MacDonald, Rob Smith
- Prize money: $ 1,141,554

Singles
- Career record: 2–1 (at ATP Tour level, Grand Slam level, and in Davis Cup)
- Career titles: 0
- Highest ranking: No. 500 (21 July 2014)

Doubles
- Career record: 160–148 (at ATP level, Grand Slam level, and in Davis Cup)
- Career titles: 5
- Highest ranking: No. 34 (29 January 2018)
- Current ranking: No. 302 (24 June 2024)

Grand Slam doubles results
- Australian Open: QF (2018, 2021)
- French Open: 3R (2016)
- Wimbledon: QF (2019)
- US Open: 3R (2016)

Other doubles tournaments
- Olympic Games: Bronze (2021)

Grand Slam mixed doubles results
- Australian Open: 1R (2018)
- Wimbledon: 3R (2019)
- US Open: 2R (2021)
Medal record
Olympic Games
Bronze medal – third place	2020 Tokyo	Men's doubles
- Last updated on: 25 June 2024.

Marcus Daniell (born 9 November 1989) is a New Zealand former professional tennis player. He reached his career-high ATP doubles ranking of world No. 34 on 29 January 2018 after reaching the quarterfinals of the Australian Open. He won a bronze medal in the men's doubles at the 2020 Summer Olympics, alongside Michael Venus.

Daniell is a philanthropist and an advocate for effective altruism through his work as the founder of High Impact Athletes and as a member of Giving What We Can.

== Career ==
=== 2010: ATP debut and first title ===
While mainly playing in futures events, Daniell received a doubles wildcard entry to play in the 2010 Heineken Open, an ATP 250 event in his home country of New Zealand. With new doubles partner, Horia Tecău, they had an improbable run to the finals of the event. The pair first dispatched fellow New Zealanders the Statham brothers, 6–3, 6–2. Daniell and Tecău then won a three set showdown against the third seeded Spaniards Tommy Robredo and Marcel Granollers, 3–6. 7–6(5), 10–8. In the semifinal match Daniell and Tecău faced Johan Brunström and Jean-Julien Rojer who had defeated grand slam winners Lukáš Dlouhý and Leander Paes. Daniell and Tecău prevailed 3–6, 7–6(4), 10–8 to set up a final with Brazilians Marcelo Melo and Bruno Soares. In the championship match, Daniell and Tecău won against the Brazilians 7–5, 6–4, each player winning their first ATP Tour title.

Daniell was to represent New Zealand in both the singles and the doubles, paired with Rubin Statham, at the 2010 Commonwealth Games. However, he had to withdraw due to an ongoing back injury, leaving Statham to compete in the singles alone.

=== 2015-17: Two titles and four finals in doubles ===
In 2015, Daniell first teamed up with Brazilian Marcelo Demoliner in the ATP Challenger grass series leading up to Wimbledon. They followed their runner-up finish to Ken and Neal Skupski at Surbiton by beating the same opponents a week later in the final at Ilkley.

Daniell won the 2016 Stuttgart Open with Artem Sitak before again teaming up with Demoliner. They reached their first ATP World Tour final at the 2016 Swedish Open.

Daniell competed with Michael Venus at the 2016 Summer Olympics, losing a close first round match to Canadians Daniel Nestor and Vasek Pospisil 6–4, 3–6, 6–7 (6).

In 2017, Daniell and Demoliner reached three ATP World Tour finals, in São Paulo, Lyon and Chengdu, although they were unable to win any of them, and improved their ranking as a team to World No. 15. He achieved his best win when, having had to qualify for the 2017 Swiss Indoors in Basel because Demoliner was playing in Vienna, he and new partner Dominic Inglot beat the top seeds, the world's second-ranked pair of Henri Kontinen and John Peers, in the first round. They eventually lost in the semifinal to Fabrice Martin and Édouard Roger-Vasselin.

=== 2018 ===
After losing in first-round match tie-breaks in both Brisbane and Auckland, Daniell and Inglot won through to the quarter-finals in the Australian Open. In a high quality three-set match, where they saved match points in both the second and third sets, they lost to the eventual tournament winners, Oliver Marach and Mate Pavić, 4–6, 7–6 (10), 6–7 (5). Daniell also played in the Mixed Doubles, teaming up with Chinese player Xu Yifan. They drew third seeds and eventual semi-finalists Ekaterina Makarova and Bruno Soares as their first-round opponents and, although winning the second set, were outclassed in the match tie-break, the final score being 6–3, 5–7, 10–2.

Daniell and Artem Sitak teamed up for the doubles in the Davis Cup tie against China, but were beaten by Gong Mao-Xin and Zhang Ze. He then returned to the ATP tour with Inglot, losing in the first round in Montpellier before finishing runners-up to Michael Venus and Raven Klaasen in Marseille. Although Daniell had previously faced a New Zealander (Rubin Statham) in a Challenger doubles final, this was the first time that New Zealanders had been on opposite sides of the net in an ATP World Tour doubles final. Daniell and Inglot then moved to Dubai, where they lost in a match tie-break in the first round to second seeds Jean-Julien Rojer and Horia Tecău.

Moving on to Indian Wells, Daniell teamed as a one-off with Diego Schwartzman. After a tough opening match, and a much easier second round, they lost in the quarter-finals to Bob and Mike Bryan, 7–5, 6–1. The following week in Miami he and Inglot faced the Bryan brothers in the first round, winning the first set but losing the second and being well-beaten in the match tie-break. They used the Marrakech tournament to start their clay court season, winning in the first round but losing in the second to Divij Sharan and Jan-Lennard Struff. In that match Daniell aggravated an injury to his right wrist which he had picked up during the Davis Cup tie against China, and announced later that he would miss the rest of the clay court season to concentrate on his rehabilitation. After the French Open it was revealed that Inglot had decided to seek another partner for the grass court season, due to his uncertainty over whether or not Daniell would be fit, and that Daniell would be teaming up with fellow New Zealander Artem Sitak's former partner in Wesley Koolhof.

Daniell returned to tournament play at Queen's Club in London. He and Koolhof lost in qualifying, but became lucky losers and beat the wildcard combination of Novak Djokovic and Stan Wawrinka in the first round, before going down to Jamie Murray and Bruno Soares in a match tie-break. In their last tournament before Wimbledon, Daniell and Koolhof lost in the first round at Eastbourne to Ryan Harrison and Nicholas Monroe, again in a match tie-break.

At Wimbledon Daniell and Koolhof lost to qualifiers Sriram Balaji and Vishnu Vardhan in the first round, while in the mixed doubles he and Nadiia Kichenok won their first match, but lost in the second round to 10th seeds Juan Sebastian Cabal and Abigail Spears. They then returned to the European clay courts, losing in the quarter-finals of the Swedish Open, the semi-finals of the German Open in Hamburg (to Oliver Marach and Mate Pavic), and the first round in Kitzbühel, the latter to Jürgen Melzer and Philipp Petzschner, who had also beaten them in Sweden.

In their last tournament before the US Open, Daniell and Koolhof played at Winston-Salem, losing in the quarter-finals to eventual champions Jean-Julien Rojer and Horia Tecau. At Flushing Meadows they won their first round match, but lost the second to fourth seeds Jamie Murray and Bruno Soares.

Daniell then travelled to Korea, where he joined the rest of the New Zealand Davis Cup team in Gimcheon. Scheduled to play the doubles rubber with Artem Sitak, Daniell had to withdraw on the morning of the match due to a recurrence of a back injury, his place being taken by Ajeet Rai. New Zealand lost the tie 2–3, being relegated to Asia/Oceania Group II for the first time in five years.

Daniell and Koolhof next played in Shenzhen, losing in the quarter-finals to Max Mirnyi and Philipp Oswald. They found Marach and Pavic too strong again in the China Open, losing 14–12 in a match tie-break in the quarter-finals. Daniell returned to play a Challenger event in his home city of Barcelona after that match, losing in his third successive quarter-final, and then teamed up again with Koolhof to play in the Stockholm Open. They were the only seeded team to reach the semi-finals, where they beat Julien Benneteau and Lucas Pouille, and they met the British pair of Luke Bambridge and Jonny O'Mara in the final. Losing the first set, they held four set points in the second set tie-break, but were unable to convert any, and then a fifth set point went by as well. Bambridge and O'Mara won on their second match point, the score being 7–5, 7–6 (8).

Their next event was the Austrian Open, where they lost in a first round match tie-break to Joe Salisbury and Neal Skupski. Daniell's final tournament for the year was a Challenger event in Eckental, Germany, where he teamed up with his former long-term partner in Marcelo Demoliner. They were top seeds, but both their first two matches went to three tie-breaks, winning both the deciders 10–7. Their semi-final was against the German fourth seeds, Kevin Krawietz and Andreas Mies, who had raucous vocal support from the local crowd. Yet another match tie-break was required, with the crowd going wild as Krawietz and Mies prevailed 10–8. They went on to win the title.

=== 2019 ===
Daniell and Koolhof began their year in Brisbane, needing tie-breaks of one kind or another in all three matches on their way to the final, where they defeated fourth seeds Rajeev Ram and Joe Salisbury in straight sets, 6–4, 7–6 (6). It was the fourth ATP World Tour title for each of them, but their first together. In Auckland they lost in a very close quarter-final, 7–6 (4), 7–6 (5), to the eventual champions, Ben McLachlan and Jan-Lennard Struff, in a match which didn't start until 11.15 pm due to Struff having had a three-hour singles quarter-final match earlier that evening.

In the Australian Open they beat the wildly popular home pair of Lleyton Hewitt and John-Patrick Smith in three sets, before falling to Michael Venus and Raven Klaasen in the second round. With yet another injury break intervening, it was another month before Daniell played again, he and Koolhof losing in the first round in Acapulco to Feliciano and Marc López.

Phoenix was their next stop, where they lost a very tight quarter-final match in the Phoenix Challenger to eventual champions Jamie Murray and Neal Skupski, 6–7 (8), 6–4, 12–10. Daniell and Koolhof went in different directions after that, with Daniell losing in the first round of a Challenger at Sophia Antipolis in France, and then partnering David Marrero to victory in the Challenger tournament in Murcia.

Reunited with Koolhof, Daniell next played in the Hungarian Open in Budapest, where they lost in the final to Ken and Neal Skupski. They made the semi-finals in Estoril before losing to top seeds Łukasz Kubot and Marcelo Melo in the second round of the French Open. Daniell and Luke Bambridge reached the semi-finals at Surbiton before he and Koolhof were beaten in the final at 's-Hertogenbosch by Dominic Inglot and Austin Krajicek.

Daniell partnered with Leander Paes at Ilkley, losing in the final to Santiago González and Aisam-ul-Haq Qureshi, before rejoining Koolhof at Eastbourne. They again found Inglot and Krajicek to be a stumbling block, losing in a match tie-break in the quarter-finals. In a career-best performance for the New Zealander at a Grand Slam event, Daniell and Koolhof got to the quarter-finals at Wimbledon, where they were beaten in straight sets by Ivan Dodig and Filip Polášek. In another career-best effort, Daniell and Jennifer Brady made the third round of the mixed doubles before losing to eventual semi-finalists Matwé Middelkoop and Yang Zhaoxuan.

Daniell's partnership with Koolhof came to an end at Wimbledon, and he rejoined Paes for the only American grass court tournament, at Newport, where they reached the semi-finals. First round losses followed at Montreal, Winston-Salem and the US Open, the latter two with Ken Skupski. Daniell also played mixed doubles at the US Open, partnering Croatia's Darija Jurak, but they were well-beaten in the first round by the second seeds, Gabriela Dabrowski and Mate Pavić.

In September he and Michael Venus won the doubles rubber in New Zealand's Davis Cup tie against Indonesia, before Daniell linked up with what he hoped would be his new long-term partner, Philipp Oswald. They reached the semi-finals in Moscow and Vienna before finishing the year with a second round loss in the Paris Masters.

=== 2020 ===
Daniell and Oswald resumed in the ASB Classic in Auckland, losing in the final to Luke Bambridge and Ben McLachlan. They then lost in the first round four times in a row, at the Australian Open to sixth seeds Marcel Granollers and Horacio Zeballos, in New York and Delray Beach to Marcelo Arevalo and Jonny O'Mara and, in somewhat of an upset, to Grigor Dimitrov and Taylor Fritz in Acapulco.

After that it was back to New Zealand for the Davis Cup tie against Venezuela in Auckland, where Daniell teamed up with Artem Sitak for the first time in two years. New Zealand won the tie 3–1, with Daniell and Sitak beating Luis David Martínez and Jordi Muñoz Abreu 6–3, 7–6 (3) in the doubles rubber. International play was suspended because of the COVID-19 coronavirus just a few days later.

Daniell resumed his career in the US Open at the beginning of September, where he and Oswald defeated Raven Klaasen and Oliver Marach in the first round, but were upset by the American wild card pair of Christopher Eubanks and Mackenzie McDonald in the second. They lost in the quarter-finals in Kitzbühel and Forli in the lead-up to the rescheduled French Open, where they lost in the first round to seventh seeds Mate Pavić and Bruno Soares. That was also their fate when top seeds in Parma, but they followed that by winning the title as third seeds at the new ATP250 tournament in Santa Margherita di Pula, upsetting top seeds Juan Sebastián Cabal and Robert Farah in the final.

Daniell and Oswald then moved on to Cologne, where they lost to French Open champions Kevin Krawietz and Andreas Mies in the semi-finals, and followed that with a quarter-final loss in Nur-Sultan. Their final tournament for the year was the Paris Masters, where they beat Krawietz and Alexander Zverev in the first round before losing to Jürgen Melzer and Édouard Roger-Vasselin. Although that was the extent of their on-court activity, Daniell was elected to the ATP Player Council in December as one of the two doubles representatives, replacing Melzer, who retired from competitive tennis after the ATP Finals.

=== 2021-24: Olympics Bronze medalist, hiatus, retirement ===
At the 2020 Summer Olympics he won the bronze medal in doubles with fellow New Zealander Michael Venus defeating Austin Krajicek and Tennys Sandgren.

He suffered a knee injury in April 2022 which ruled him out of Wimbledon and for the rest of the 2022 season.

In December 2023, after a long injury break, he resumed his career by finishing runner-up in the non-tour Wellington Open, and then won the ITF M15 event at the same venue a week later, both times with Finn Reynolds as his partner.

He entered the 2024 Australian Open in doubles using protected ranking partnering Marcelo Demoliner. He entered the 2024 BNP Paribas Open as an alternate pair with John-Patrick Smith. He used protected ranking for Roland Garros, for Wimbledon and for the US Open.

He retired at his home tournament, the 2025 ASB Classic.

== Olympic medal finals ==
=== Doubles: 1 (1 bronze medal) ===
Result	Year	Tournament	Surface	Partner	Opponents	Score
Bronze	2021	2020 Summer Olympics, Japan	Hard	(New Zealand) Michael Venus	(United States) Austin Krajicek (United States) Tennys Sandgren	7–6^{(7–3)}, 6–2

== ATP career finals ==
=== Doubles: 15 (5 titles, 10 runners-up) ===
Legend Grand Slam tournaments (0–0) ATP World Tour Finals (0–0) ATP World Tour Masters 1000 (0–0) ATP World Tour 500 Series (0–0) ATP World Tour 250 Series (5–10)	Titles by surface Hard (3–5) Clay (1–4) Grass (1–1)	Titles by setting Outdoor (4–8) Indoor (1–2)

Result	W–L	Date	Tournament	Tier	Surface	Partner	Opponents	Score
Win	1–0	Jan 2010	Auckland Open, New Zealand	250 Series	Hard	(Romania) Horia Tecău	(Brazil) Marcelo Melo (Brazil) Bruno Soares	7–5, 6–4
Win	2–0	Feb 2015	Open Sud de France, France	250 Series	Hard (i)	(New Zealand) Artem Sitak	(United Kingdom) Dominic Inglot (Romania) Florin Mergea	3–6, 6–4, [16–14]
Win	3–0	Jun 2016	Stuttgart Open, Germany	250 Series	Grass	(New Zealand) Artem Sitak	(Austria) Oliver Marach (France) Fabrice Martin	6–7^{(4–7)}, 6–4, [10–8]
Loss	3–1	Jul 2016	Swedish Open, Sweden	250 Series	Clay	(Brazil) Marcelo Demoliner	(Spain) Marcel Granollers (Spain) David Marrero	2–6, 3–6
Loss	3–2	Mar 2017	Brasil Open, Brazil	250 Series	Clay	(Brazil) Marcelo Demoliner	(Brazil) Rogério Dutra Silva (Brazil) André Sá	6–7^{(5–7)}, 7–5, [7–10]
Loss	3–3	May 2017	Lyon Open, France	250 Series	Clay	(Brazil) Marcelo Demoliner	(Argentina) Andrés Molteni (Canada) Adil Shamasdin	3–6, 6–3, [5–10]
Loss	3–4	Oct 2017	Chengdu Open, China	250 Series	Hard	(Brazil) Marcelo Demoliner	(Israel) Jonathan Erlich (Pakistan) Aisam-ul-Haq Qureshi	3–6, 6–7^{(3–7)}
Loss	3–5	Feb 2018	Open 13, France	250 Series	Hard (i)	(United Kingdom) Dominic Inglot	(South Africa) Raven Klaasen (New Zealand) Michael Venus	7–6^{(7–2)}, 3–6, [4–10]
Loss	3–6	Oct 2018	Stockholm Open, Sweden	250 Series	Hard (i)	(Netherlands) Wesley Koolhof	(United Kingdom) Luke Bambridge (United Kingdom) Jonny O'Mara	5–7, 6–7^{(8–10)}
Win	4–6	Jan 2019	Brisbane International, Australia	250 Series	Hard	(Netherlands) Wesley Koolhof	(United States) Rajeev Ram (United Kingdom) Joe Salisbury	6–4, 7–6^{(8–6)}
Loss	4–7	Apr 2019	Hungarian Open, Hungary	250 Series	Clay	(Netherlands) Wesley Koolhof	(United Kingdom) Ken Skupski (United Kingdom) Neal Skupski	3–6, 4–6
Loss	4–8	May 2019	Rosmalen Championships, Netherlands	250 Series	Grass	(Netherlands) Wesley Koolhof	(United Kingdom) Dominic Inglot (United States) Austin Krajicek	4–6, 6–4, [4–10]
Loss	4–9	Jan 2020	Auckland Open, New Zealand	250 Series	Hard	(Austria) Philipp Oswald	(United Kingdom) Luke Bambridge (Japan) Ben McLachlan	6–7^{(3–7)}, 3–6
Win	5–9	Oct 2020	Sardegna Open, Italy	250 Series	Clay	(Austria) Philipp Oswald	(Colombia) Juan Sebastián Cabal (Colombia) Robert Farah	6–3, 6–4
Loss	5–10	Mar 2021	Qatar Open, Qatar	250 Series	Hard	(Austria) Philipp Oswald	(Russia) Aslan Karatsev (Russia) Andrey Rublev	5–7, 4–6

== AtP Challenger and ITF Tour finals ==
=== Singles: 4 (2 titles, 2 runners-up) ===
Legend (singles) ATP Challenger Tour (0–0) ITF Futures Tour (2–2)	Titles by surface Hard (0–2) Clay (0–0) Grass (2–0)

Result	W–L	Date	Tournament	Tier	Surface	Opponent	Score
Loss	0–1	Sep 2009	Israel F6, Ramat HaSharon	Futures	Hard	(Israel) Noam Okun	6–7^{(4–7)}, 2–6
Loss	0–2	Oct 2011	Mexico F12, Veracruz	Futures	Hard	(Mexico) Luis Díaz Barriga	4–6, 6–3, 3–6
Win	1–2	Jul 2013	Great Britain F13, Ilkley	Futures	Grass	(United Kingdom) Tom Farquharson	6–3, 3–6, 6–3
Win	2–2	Jul 2014	Great Britain F13, Ilkley	Futures	Grass	(United Kingdom) Lewis Burton	6–2, 7–5

=== Doubles: 40 (25 titles, 15 runners-up) ===
Legend (doubles) ATP Challenger Tour (8–6) ITF Futures/WT Tour (16–8)	Titles by surface Hard (17–10) Clay (2–1) Grass (5–1) Carpet (1–2)

Result	W–L	Date	Tournament	Tier	Surface	Partner	Opponents	Score
Loss	0–1	Mar 2009	New Zealand F3, Wellington	Futures	Hard	(Australia) Joel Lindner	(New Zealand) G.D. Jones (New Zealand) Daniel King-Turner	2–6, 4–6
Loss	0–2	Sep 2009	Israel F5, Ramat HaSharon	Futures	Hard	(Slovakia) Miloslav Mečíř	(United States) John Paul Fruttero (New Zealand) G.D. Jones	6–3, 2–6, [4–10]
Win	1–2	Sep 2009	Israel F6, Ramat HaSharon	Futures	Hard	(Israel) Amir Weintraub	(United States) John Paul Fruttero (New Zealand) G.D. Jones	6–1, 6–7^{(4–7)}, [10–5]
Loss	1–3	May 2010	Australia F3, Ipswich	Futures	Clay	(New Zealand) Logan Mackenzie	(Australia) Brydan Klein (Australia) Dane Propoggia	2–6, 3–6
Win	2–3	Jun 2010	USA F13, Loomis	Futures	Hard	(New Zealand) Michael Venus	(Australia) Nima Roshan (New Zealand) Rubin Statham	6–4, 6–4
Win	3–3	Feb 2011	Turkey F5, Antalya	Futures	Hard	(New Zealand) Michael Venus	(Russia) Alexander Rumyantsev (Russia) Dmitri Sitak	2–6, 6–1, [11–9]
Win	4–3	Jun 2011	Mexico F7, Morelia	Futures	Hard	(New Zealand) Artem Sitak	(Philippines) Ruben Gonzales (United States) Chris Kwon	6–0, 6–3
Win	5–3	Apr 2012	Switzerland F3, Fällanden	Futures	Carpet (i)	(Hungary) Márton Fucsovics	(Switzerland) Adrian Bodmer (Austria) Philipp Oswald	6–7^{(3–7)}, 6–3, [10–8]
Win	6–3	Apr 2012	Turkey F15, Antalya	Futures	Hard	(Germany) Gero Kretschmer	(Bosnia and Herzegovina) Tomislav Brkić (Croatia) Mislav Hižak	6–0, 6–2
Win	7–3	May 2012	Israel F8, Ramat HaSharon	Futures	Hard	(Chinese Taipei) Chen Ti	(Israel) Noam Behr (Israel) Noam Okun	7–6^{(7–1)} ret.
Win	8–3	May 2012	Israel F9, Ramat HaSharon	Futures	Hard	(Chinese Taipei) Chen Ti	(Israel) Aviv Ben Shabat (Israel) Noam Okun	6–0, 6–2
Loss	8–4	Sep 2012	Great Britain F15, Roehampton	Futures	Hard	(Mexico) Manuel Sánchez	(South Africa) Jean Andersen (South Africa) Ruan Roelofse	2–6, 6–4, [10–12]
Win	9–4	Nov 2012	Cambodia F1, Phnom Penh	Futures	Hard	(United Kingdom) Richard Gabb	(China) Gao Peng (China) Gao Wan	6–0, 6–0
Win	10–4	Dec 2012	Cambodia F2, Phnom Penh	Futures	Hard	(United Kingdom) Richard Gabb	(China) Gao Wan (India) Jeevan Nedunchezhiyan	6–1, 7–6^{(7–5)}
Win	11–4	Dec 2012	Cambodia F3, Phnom Penh	Futures	Hard	(United Kingdom) Richard Gabb	(China) Gao Peng (China) Gao Wan	7–5, 6–2
Loss	11–5	Dec 2012	Hong Kong F3, Hong Kong	Futures	Hard	(Australia) Kaden Hensel	(United States) Sekou Bangoura (United States) Daniel Nguyen	4–6, 2–6
Win	12–5	May 2013	Greece F7, Marathon	Futures	Hard	(United Kingdom) Richard Gabb	(South Africa) Keith-Patrick Crowley (South Africa) Tucker Vorster	6–1, 6–1
Win	13–5	Jul 2013	Great Britain F13, Ilkley	Futures	Grass	(United Kingdom) Richard Gabb	(United Kingdom) George Coupland (United Kingdom) Joe Salisbury	6–3, 4–6, [10–8]
Win	14–5	Jul 2013	Great Britain F14, Felixstowe	Futures	Grass	(United Kingdom) Richard Gabb	(United Kingdom) Robin Goodman (United Kingdom) Euan Mcintosh	7–6^{(9–7)}, 6–4
Loss	14–6	Jul 2013	Ireland F1, Dublin	Futures	Carpet	(United Kingdom) Richard Gabb	(Republic of Ireland) John Morrissey (Republic of Ireland) Colin O'Brien	4–6, 7–6^{(7–1)}, [7–10]
Loss	14–7	Sep 2013	Turkey F34, Antalya	Futures	Hard	(United Kingdom) Richard Gabb	(Israel) Dekel Bar (Sweden) Tobias Blomgren	6–2, 4–6, [8–10]
Win	15–7	Sep 2013	Turkey F34, Antalya	Futures	Hard	(United Kingdom) Richard Gabb	(Italy) Matteo Marfia (Italy) Francesco Vilardo	6–2, 7–5
Loss	15–8	Nov 2013	Toyota, Japan	Challenger	Carpet (i)	(New Zealand) Artem Sitak	(United States) Chase Buchanan (Slovenia) Blaž Rola	6–4, 3–6, [4–10]
Win	16–8	Feb 2014	West Lakes, Australia	Challenger	Hard	(United States) Jarmere Jenkins	(Australia) Dane Propoggia (New Zealand) Rubin Statham	6–4, 6–4
Win	17–8	Feb 2014	Australia F1, Happy Valley	Futures	Hard	(Australia) Dane Propoggia	(Japan) Takuto Niki (Japan) Yasutaka Uchiyama	6–3, 6–2
Loss	17–9	Apr 2014	León, Mexico	Challenger	Hard	(New Zealand) Artem Sitak	(Australia) Sam Groth (Australia) Chris Guccione	3–6, 4–6
Win	18–9	Jul 2014	Granby, Canada	Challenger	Hard	(New Zealand) Artem Sitak	(Australia) Jordan Kerr (France) Fabrice Martin	7–6^{(7–5)}, 5–7, [10–5]
Loss	18–10	Aug 2014	Vancouver, Canada	Challenger	Hard	(New Zealand) Artem Sitak	(United States) Austin Krajicek (Australia) John-Patrick Smith	3–6, 6–4, [8–10]
Loss	18–11	Aug 2014	Canada F8, Winnipeg	Futures	Hard	(Canada) Philip Bester	(Bulgaria) Dimitar Kutrovsky (India) Saketh Myneni	5–7, 5–7
Loss	18–12	Nov 2014	Traralgon, Australia	Challenger	Hard	(New Zealand) Artem Sitak	(United Kingdom) Brydan Klein (Australia) Dane Propoggia	6–7^{(6–8)}, 6–3, [6–10]
Loss	18–13	Nov 2014	Yokohama, Japan	Challenger	Hard	(New Zealand) Artem Sitak	(United States) Bradley Klahn (Australia) Matt Reid	6–4, 4–6, [7–10]
Loss	18–14	Jun 2015	Surbiton, UK	Challenger	Grass	(Brazil) Marcelo Demoliner	(United Kingdom) Ken Skupski (United Kingdom) Neal Skupski	3–6, 4–6
Win	19–14	Jun 2015	Ilkley, UK	Challenger	Grass	(Brazil) Marcelo Demoliner	(United Kingdom) Ken Skupski (United Kingdom) Neal Skupski	7–6^{(7–3)}, 6–4
Win	20–14	Mar 2016	Puebla, Mexico	Challenger	Hard	(New Zealand) Artem Sitak	(Mexico) Santiago González (Croatia) Mate Pavić	3–6, 6–2, [12–10]
Win	21–14	Mar 2016	San Luis Potosí, Mexico	Challenger	Clay	(New Zealand) Artem Sitak	(Mexico) Santiago González (Croatia) Mate Pavić	6–3, 7–6^{(7–4)}
Win	22–14	Mar 2017	Irving, US	Challenger	Grass	(Brazil) Marcelo Demoliner	(Austria) Oliver Marach (France) Fabrice Martin	6–3, 6–4
Win	23–14	Jun 2017	Surbiton, UK	Challenger	Grass	(Pakistan) Aisam-ul-Haq Qureshi	(Philippines) Treat Huey (United States) Denis Kudla	6–3, 7–6^{(7–0)}
Win	24–14	Apr 2019	Murcia, Spain	Challenger	Clay	(Spain) David Marrero	(Australia) Rameez Junaid (Belarus) Andrei Vasilevski	6–4, 6–4
Loss	24–15	Jun 2019	Ilkley, UK	Challenger	Grass	(India) Leander Paes	(Mexico) Santiago González (Pakistan) Aisam-ul-Haq Qureshi	3–6, 4–6
Win	25–15	Dec 2023	Wellington, New Zealand	M15 WTT	Hard	(New Zealand) Finn Reynolds	(Australia) Joshua Charlton (United Kingdom) Emile Hudd	6–4, 6–2

== Davis Cup ==
Legend Group membership World Group (0) Group I (11–3) Group II (2–3) Group III (0) Group IV (0)	Results by surface Hard (12–3) Grass (1–0) Clay (0–3) Carpet (0–0)	Results by setting Outdoors (5–2) Indoors (8–4)

Note: walkover victory when Pakistan abandoned the tie in 2013 is not counted as a match played

- ▲ ▼ indicates the outcome of the Davis Cup match followed by the score, date, place of event, the zonal classification and its phase, and the court surface.

Rubber outcome	No.	Rubber	Match type (partner if any)	Opponent nation	Opponent player(s)	Score
▲3–2; 5–7 March 2010; Sri Lanka Tennis Association, Colombo, Sri Lanka; Group II Asia/Oceania First round; Clay surface
Defeat	1.	III	Doubles (with Daniel King-Turner)	Sri Lanka	Harshana Godamanna / Rajeev Rajapakse	6–7^{(5–7)} , 4–6, 3–6
▲3–2; 9–11 July 2010; TSB Hub, Hāwera, New Zealand; Group II Asia/Oceania Second round; Hard (i) surface
Defeat	2.	III	Doubles (with Michael Venus)	Pakistan	Aqeel Khan / Aisam-ul-Haq Qureshi	6–7^{(6–8)} , 3–6, 2–6
▼2–3; 4–6 March 2011; Sport Complex Pahlavon, Namangan, Uzbekistan; Group I Asia/Oceania First round; Clay (i) surface
Defeat	3.	III	Doubles (with Michael Venus)	Uzbekistan	Farrukh Dustov / Denis Istomin	6–7^{(5–7)} , 3–6, 4–6
▲5–0; 8–10 July 2011; TSB Hub, Hāwera, New Zealand; Group I Asia/Oceania Relegation Play-off, First round play-off; Hard (i) surface
Victory	1.	III	Doubles (with Artem Sitak)	Philippines	Ruben Gonzales / Cecil Mamiit	7–6^{(7–0)}, 6–3, 6–2
Victory	2.	IV	Singles (dead rubber)	Philippines	Jeson Patrombon	4–6, 6–3, 6–3
▲5–0; 1–3 February 2013; Albany Tennis Centre, Auckland, New Zealand; Group II Asia/Oceania First round; Hard (i) surface
Victory	3.	III	Doubles (with Daniel King-Turner)	Lebanon	Ibrahim Abou Chahine / Karim Alayli	6–1, 6–1, 6–1
▲4–1; 5–7 April 2013; Pun Hlaing Golf & Country Club, Yangon, Myanmar; Group II Asia/Oceania Second round; Grass surface
Victory	(not counted as match played)	III	Doubles (with Daniel King-Turner)	Pakistan	Aqeel Khan / Aisam-ul-Haq Qureshi	won by walkover
▲3–2; 13–15 September 2013; Plantation Bay Resort & Spa, Lapu-Lapu City, Philippines; Group II Asia/Oceania Third round; Clay surface
Defeat	4.	III	Doubles (with Artem Sitak)	Philippines	Francis Casey Alcantara / Treat Huey	4–6, 3–6, 4–6
▼1–3; 27–29 January 2014; Tianjin Tennis Centre, Tianjin, China; Group I Asia/Oceania First round; Hard (i) surface
Victory	4.	III	Doubles (with Michael Venus)	China	Gong Maoxin / Li Zhe	6–3, 7–6^{(7–3)}, 7–5
▲4–1; 24–26 October 2014; Wilding Park Tennis Centre, Christchurch, New Zealand; Group I Asia/Oceania Relegation Play-off, Second round play-off; Hard (i) surface
Victory	5.	III	Doubles (with Artem Sitak)	Chinese Taipei	Peng Hsien-yin / Wang Chieh-fu	6–0, 6–4, 6–2
Victory	6.	V	Singles (dead rubber)	Chinese Taipei	Hung Jui-chen	7–6^{(7–3)}, 7–5
▲4–1; 6–8 March 2015; ASB Tennis Centre, Auckland, New Zealand; Group I Asia/Oceania First round; Hard surface
Victory	7.	III	Doubles (with Artem Sitak)	China	Li Zhe / Zhang Ze	6–7^{(3–7)}, 6–7^{(4–7)}, 7–6^{(7–1)}, 6–3, 6–2
▼2–3; 17–19 July 2015; Wilding Park Tennis Centre, Christchurch, New Zealand; Group I Asia/Oceania Second round; Hard (i) surface
Victory	8.	III	Doubles (with Artem Sitak)	India	Rohan Bopanna / Saketh Myneni	6–3, 7–6^{(7–1)}, 6–3
Defeat	5.	IV	Singles	India	Somdev Devvarman	4–6, 4–6, 4–6
▲5–0; 16–18 September 2016; Wilding Park Tennis Centre, Christchurch, New Zealand; Group I Asia/Oceania Relegation Play-off, Second round play-off; Hard (i) surface
Victory	9.	III	Doubles (with Michael Venus)	Pakistan	Mohammad Abid Ali Khan Akbar / Aqeel Khan	6–0, 6–1, 6–2
▲3–2; 7–9 April 2017; ASB Tennis Centre, Auckland, New Zealand; Group I Asia/Oceania Relegation Play-off, First round play-off; Hard surface
Victory	10.	III	Doubles (with Artem Sitak)	South Korea	Chung Hong / Lee Jea-moon	6–2, 4–6, 6–4, 7–6^{(7–4)}
▼1–3; 2–3 February 2018; Tianjin Tennis Centre, Tianjin, China; Group I Asia/Oceania First round; Hard (i) surface
Defeat	6.	III	Doubles (with Artem Sitak)	China	Gong Maoxin / Zhang Ze	4–6, 4–6
▲3–1; 14–15 September 2019; Gelora Bung Karno Sports Complex, Jakarta, Indonesia; Group II Asia/Oceania First round; Hard surface
Victory	11.	III	Doubles (with Michael Venus)	Indonesia	Anthony Susanto / David Agung Susanto	6–0, 6–2
▲3–1; 6–7 March 2020; ASB Tennis Centre, Auckland, New Zealand; World Group I Play-off, Play-off round; Hard surface
Victory	12.	III	Doubles (with Artem Sitak)	Venezuela	Luis David Martínez / Jordi Muñoz Abreu	6–3, 7–6^{(7–3)}
▼1–3; 18–19 September 2021; International Tennis Hall of Fame, Newport, Rhode Island, USA; World Group I; Grass surface
Victory	13.	III	Doubles (with Michael Venus)	South Korea	Nam Ji-sung / Song Min-kyu	4–6, 6–2, 6–4

== Performance timelines ==
Key
W	F	SF	QF	#R	RR	Q#	DNQ	A	NH

(W) winner; (F) finalist; (SF) semifinalist; (QF) quarterfinalist; (#R) rounds 4, 3, 2, 1; (RR) round-robin stage; (Q#) qualification round; (DNQ) did not qualify; (A) absent; (NH) not held; (SR) strike rate (events won / competed); (W–L) win–loss record.
To avoid confusion and double counting, these charts are updated at the conclusion of a tournament or when the player's participation has ended.

=== Doubles ===
Current through the 2024 US Open (tennis).

Tournament	2015	2016	2017	2018	2019	2020	2021	2022	..	2024	!SR	W–L
Grand Slam tournaments
Australian Open	A	1R	3R	QF	2R	1R	QF	2R		1R	0 / 8	10–8
French Open	1R	3R	1R	A	2R	1R	2R	A		2R	0 / 7	5–7
Wimbledon	3R	1R	3R	1R	QF	NH	2R	A		1R	0 / 7	7–7
US Open	2R	3R	2R	2R	1R	2R	2R	A		1R	0 / 8	7–8
Win–loss	3–3	4–4	5–4	4–3	5–4	1–3	6–4	1–1		1–4	0 / 30	29–30
ATP Tour Masters 1000
Indian Wells Masters	A	A	A	QF	A	NH	A	A		1R	0 / 2	2–2
Miami Open	A	A	1R	1R	A	NH	1R	A			0 / 3	0–3
Monte-Carlo Masters	A	A	A	A	A	NH	A	A			0 / 0	0–0
Madrid Open	A	A	A	A	A	NH	A	A			0 / 0	0–0
Italian Open	A	A	A	A	A	A	2R	A			0 / 1	1–1
Canadian Open	A	A	A	A	1R	NH	A	A			0 / 1	0–1
Cincinnati Masters	A	A	A	A	A	A	1R	A			0 / 1	0–1
Shanghai Masters	A	A	A	A	A	NH					0 / 0	0–0
Paris Masters	A	A	A	A	2R	2R	A	A			0 / 2	2–2
Win–loss	0–0	0–0	0–1	2–2	1–2	1–1	1–3	0–0		0–1	0 / 10	5–10

=== Mixed doubles ===
Although the US and French Opens took place in 2020, mixed doubles were not included in either event due to the COVID-19 pandemic.

Grand Slam tournaments
Tournament	2017	2018	2019	2020	2021	2022	W–L
Australian Open	A	1R	A	A	A	A	0–1
French Open	A	A	A	NH	A	A	0–0
Wimbledon	1R	2R	3R	NH	A	A	3–3
US Open	A	A	1R	NH	2R	A	1–2
Win–loss	0–1	1–2	2–2	0–0	1–1	0–0	4–6

Awards
Preceded by (United States) Frances Tiafoe	Arthur Ashe Humanitarian of the Year; 2021	Succeeded by (United Kingdom) Andy Murray
