= Murcia Open =

Costa Cálida Región de Murcia
- 2026 Murcia Open

ATP Challenger Tour
- Event name: Challenger Costa Cálida Región de Murcia (2021-)
- Location: Murcia, Spain
- Venue: Real Murcia Club de Tenis 1919
- Category: ATP Challenger Tour
- Surface: Clay
- Draw: 32S/24Q/16D
- Prize money: €91,250 (2025), 45,730
- Website: Official Website

Current champions (2026)
- Singles: (Spain) Pablo Carreño Busta
- Doubles: (Lebanon) Benjamin Hassan (Austria) Sebastian Ofner

The Challenger Costa Cálida Región de Murcia is a professional tennis tournament played on clay courts. It is currently part of the ATP Challenger Tour. It is held annually in Murcia, Spain since 2019.

== Past finals ==
=== Singles ===
Year	Champion	Runner-up	Score
2026	(Spain) Pablo Carreño Busta	(Spain) Roberto Carballés Baena	6–4, 6–3
2025	(Spain) Carlos Taberner	(Netherlands) Jesper de Jong	7–6^{(7–3)}, 4–6, 6–2
2024	(Portugal) Henrique Rocha	(Georgia (country)) Nikoloz Basilashvili	3–6, 7–6^{(7–0)}, 7–5
2023	(Italy) Matteo Arnaldi	(Croatia) Borna Gojo	6–4, 7–6^{(7–4)}
2022	(Chinese Taipei) Tseng Chun-hsin	(Slovakia) Norbert Gombos	6–4, 6–1
2021	(Netherlands) Tallon Griekspoor	(Spain) Roberto Carballés Baena	3–6, 7–5, 6–3
2020	Not Held		
2019	(Spain) Roberto Carballés Baena	(Sweden) Mikael Ymer	2–6, 6–0, 6–2

=== Doubles ===
Year	Champions	Runners-up	Score
2026	(Lebanon) Benjamin Hassan (Austria) Sebastian Ofner	(Poland) Karol Drzewiecki (Poland) Piotr Matuszewski	6–3, 6–4
2025	(France) Grégoire Jacq (Brazil) Orlando Luz	(Netherlands) Jesper de Jong (Netherlands) Mats Hermans	6–4, 6–4
2024	(France) Théo Arribagé (Romania) Victor Vlad Cornea	(India) Arjun Kadhe (India) Jeevan Nedunchezhiyan	7–5, 6–1
2023	(Spain) Daniel Rincón (Jordan) Abedallah Shelbayh	(Italy) Marco Bortolotti (Spain) Sergio Martos Gornés	7–6^{(7–3)}, 6–4
2022	(Spain) Íñigo Cervantes (Spain) Oriol Roca Batalla	(Argentina) Pedro Cachin (Uruguay) Martín Cuevas	6–7^{(4–7)}, 7–6^{(7–4)}, [10–7]
2021	(Italy) Raúl Brancaccio (Italy) Flavio Cobolli	(Spain) Alberto Barroso Campos (Spain) Roberto Carballés Baena	6–3, 7–6^{(7–4)}
2020	Not Held		
2019	(New Zealand) Marcus Daniell (Spain) David Marrero	(Australia) Rameez Junaid (Belarus) Andrei Vasilevski	6–4, 6–4
