= 2023 Murcia Open =

- Date: 3 – 9 April
- Edition: 4th
- Surface: Clay
- Location: Murcia, Spain

Champions

Singles
- (Italy) Matteo Arnaldi

Doubles
- (Spain) Daniel Rincón / (Jordan) Abedallah Shelbayh
- Murcia Open

The 2023 Costa Cálida Región de Murcia, was a professional tennis tournament played on clay courts. It was the 4th edition of the tournament which was part of the 2023 ATP Challenger Tour. It took place in Murcia, Spain, between 3 and 9 April 2023.

== Singles main-draw entrants ==
=== Seeds ===
Country	Player	Rank^{1}	Seed
CRO	Borna Gojo	113	1
ITA	Matteo Arnaldi	116	2
ITA	Raúl Brancaccio	136	3
JPN	Kaichi Uchida	159	4
SUI	Alexander Ritschard	186	5
ARG	Andrea Collarini	191	6
~~SUI~~	~~Henri Laaksonen~~	~~203~~	~~7~~
ITA	Lorenzo Giustino	219	8

- ^{1} Rankings are as of 20 March 2023.

=== Other entrants ===
The following players received wildcards into the singles main draw:

- (United Kingdom) Kyle Edmund
- (Spain) Martín Landaluce
- (Spain) Feliciano López

The following player received entry into the singles main draw as an alternate:

- (Portugal) João Domingues

The following players received entry from the qualifying draw:

- (Lithuania) Edas Butvilas
- (Netherlands) Jesper de Jong
- (Spain) Pablo Llamas Ruiz
- (Spain) Daniel Mérida
- (Spain) Alejandro Moro Cañas
- (Spain) Carlos Sánchez Jover

The following player received entry as lucky losers:

- (Norway) Viktor Durasovic
- (Spain) Álvaro López San Martín

== Champions ==
=== Singles ===
- (Italy) Matteo Arnaldi def. (Croatia) Borna Gojo 6–4, 7–6^{(7–4)}.

=== Doubles ===
- (Spain) Daniel Rincón / (Jordan) Abedallah Shelbayh def. (Italy) Marco Bortolotti / (Spain) Sergio Martos Gornés 7–6^{(7–3)}, 6–4.
