= 2023 Murcia Open – Singles =

Singles
- 2023 Murcia Open

Final
- Champion: (Italy) Matteo Arnaldi
- Runner-up: (Croatia) Borna Gojo
- Score: 6–4, 7–6^{(7–4)}

Events
Singles	Doubles
- Murcia Open

Tseng Chun-hsin was the defending champion but chose not to defend his title.

Matteo Arnaldi won the title after defeating Borna Gojo 6–4, 7–6^{(7–4)} in the final.

== Seeds ==
1. (Croatia) Borna Gojo (final)
2. (Italy) Matteo Arnaldi (champion)
3. (Italy) Raúl Brancaccio (first round)
4. (Japan) Kaichi Uchida (first round)
5. (Switzerland) Alexander Ritschard (second round)
6. (Argentina) Andrea Collarini (second round)
7. (Switzerland) Henri Laaksonen (withdrew)
8. (Italy) Lorenzo Giustino (first round)

== Draw ==
Key

- Q = Qualifier
- WC = Wild card
- LL = Lucky loser
- Alt = Alternate
- ITF = ITF entry
- PR = Protected ranking
- SR = Special ranking
- SE = Special exempt
- JE = Junior exempt
- JR = Junior Accelerator Programme entrant
- CO = College Accelerator Programme entrant
- NG = Next Gen Accelerator Program entrant
- w/o = Walkover
- r = Retired
- d = Defaulted

=== Finals ===
Semifinals
1	(Croatia) Borna Gojo	7^{7}	6^{3}	6
Q	(Spain) Pablo Llamas Ruiz	6^{4}	7^{7}	4
(Argentina) Marco Trungelliti	6^{4}	4
2	(Italy) Matteo Arnaldi	7^{7}	6

Final
1	(Croatia) Borna Gojo	4	6^{4}
2	(Italy) Matteo Arnaldi	6	7^{7}

=== Top half ===
First round
1	(Croatia) B Gojo	6	6
(Spain) N Álvarez Varona	3	2
I Gakhov	7^{7}	6
WC	(Spain) M Landaluce	6^{4}	4
Q	(Netherlands) J de Jong	6	6
Q	(Spain) C Sánchez Jover	4	3
(Belgium) M Geerts	6	4	3
5	(Switzerland) A Ritschard	4	6	6
4	(Japan) K Uchida	4	6^{7}
(Australia) M Polmans	6	7^{9}
(Brazil) D Dutra da Silva	7	4	7
(South Korea) G Campaña Lee	5	6	5
(Jordan) A Shelbayh	7^{7}	6
Alt	(Portugal) J Domingues	6^{3}	4
Q	(Spain) P Llamas Ruiz	6	6
8	(Italy) L Giustino	2	2

Second round
1	(Croatia) B Gojo	7^{8}	3	7^{7}
I Gakhov	6^{6}	6	6^{5}
Q	(Netherlands) J de Jong	6	6
5	(Switzerland) A Ritschard	4	1
(Australia) M Polmans	3	6	3
(Brazil) D Dutra da Silva	6	4	6
(Jordan) A Shelbayh	6^{4}	6^{5}
Q	(Spain) P Llamas Ruiz	7^{7}	7^{7}

Quarterfinals
1	(Croatia) B Gojo	6	2	6
Q	(Netherlands) J de Jong	1	6	3
(Brazil) D Dutra da Silva	3	1
Q	(Spain) P Llamas Ruiz	6	6

Semifinals
1	(Croatia) B Gojo	7^{7}	6^{3}	6
Q	(Spain) P Llamas Ruiz	6^{4}	7^{7}	4

=== Bottom half ===
First round
6	(Argentina) A Collarini	6	6
Q	(Spain) D Mérida	2	2
WC	(United Kingdom) K Edmund	6	3	3
(Argentina) M Trungelliti	1	6	6
LL	(Norway) V Durasovic	7^{7}	3
(Spain) O Roca Batalla	6^{2}	1^{r}
Q	(Spain) A Moro Cañas	6	6
3	(Italy) R Brancaccio	3	4
LL	(Spain) Á López San Martín	6	6^{2}	6
Q	(Lithuania) E Butvilas	2	7^{7}	2
(France) G Debru	2	3
(Kazakhstan) M Kukushkin	6	6
(Australia) O Jasika	4	4
(Belgium) K Coppejans	6	6
WC	(Spain) F López	3	6^{4}
2	(Italy) M Arnaldi	6	7^{7}

Second round
6	(Argentina) A Collarini	6	2	3
(Argentina) M Trungelliti	4	6	6
LL	(Norway) V Durasovic	7^{9}	6
Q	(Spain) A Moro Cañas	6^{7}	4
LL	(Spain) Á López San Martín	1	6^{r}
(Kazakhstan) M Kukushkin	6	6
(Belgium) K Coppejans	6	4	4
2	(Italy) M Arnaldi	3	6	6

Quarterfinals
(Argentina) M Trungelliti	6	6
LL	(Norway) V Durasovic	4	4
(Kazakhstan) M Kukushkin	4	1
2	(Italy) M Arnaldi	6	6

Semifinals
(Argentina) M Trungelliti	6^{4}	4
2	(Italy) M Arnaldi	7^{7}	6
