= 2023 LTP Men's Open – Doubles =

Doubles
- 2023 LTP Men's Open

Final
- Champions: (United Kingdom) Luke Johnson (Tunisia) Skander Mansouri
- Runners-up: (United States) Nicholas Bybel (United States) Oliver Crawford
- Score: 6–4, 6–4

Events
Singles	Doubles
← 2022 ·	LTP Men's Open	· 2024 →

There were no defending champions as the previous edition of the tournament was canceled due to Hurricane Ian.

Luke Johnson and Skander Mansouri won the title after defeating Nicholas Bybel and Oliver Crawford 6–4, 6–4 in the final.

== Seeds ==
1. (United States) Evan King / (United States) Reese Stalder (semifinals)
2. (United Kingdom) Luke Johnson / (Tunisia) Skander Mansouri (champions)
3. (United States) Christian Harrison / (Latvia) Miķelis Lībietis (semifinals)
4. (Mexico) Hans Hach Verdugo / (New Zealand) Artem Sitak (first round)

== Draw ==
Key

- Q = Qualifier
- WC = Wild card
- LL = Lucky loser
- Alt = Alternate
- ITF = ITF entry
- PR = Protected ranking
- SR = Special ranking
- SE = Special exempt
- JE = Junior exempt
- JR = Junior Accelerator Programme entrant
- CO = College Accelerator Programme entrant
- NG = Next Gen Accelerator Program entrant
- w/o = Walkover
- r = Retired
- d = Defaulted

First round
1	(United States) E King (United States) R Stalder	6	6
WC	(United States) Carter Pate (United States) Jacob Smith	1	1
(United States) M Kiger (Canada) B Sigouin	7	4	[10]
(Denmark) A Holmgren (United States) E Zhu	5	6	[7]
4	(Mexico) H Hach Verdugo (New Zealand) A Sitak	3	4
(United States) D Kudla (United States) T Zink	6	6
(United States) T-S Kwiatkowski (Switzerland) A Ritschard	0	6	[7]
Alt	(United States) Nicholas Bybel (United States) O Crawford	6	2	[10]
(Argentina) FA Gómez (Canada) K Stevenson	3	2
(United States) A Lawson (Finland) E Vasa	6	6
(United States) M Krueger (Venezuela) LD Martínez	4	6	[9]
3	(United States) C Harrison (Latvia) M Lībietis	6	3	[11]
(Australia) T Schoolkate (Australia) A Walton	2	6	[10]
WC	(United States) R Seggerman (United States) P Trhac	6	3	[7]
Alt	(United States) G Johns (United Kingdom) R Peniston	6	5	[3]
2	(United Kingdom) L Johnson (Tunisia) S Mansouri	4	7	[10]

Quarterfinals
1	(United States) E King (United States) R Stalder	6	6
(United States) M Kiger (Canada) B Sigouin	2	4
(United States) D Kudla (United States) T Zink	4	3
Alt	(United States) N Bybel (United States) O Crawford	6	6
(United States) A Lawson (Finland) E Vasa	1	6^{4}
3	(United States) C Harrison (Latvia) M Lībietis	6	7^{7}
(Australia) T Schoolkate (Australia) A Walton	4	6	[3]
2	(United Kingdom) L Johnson (Tunisia) S Mansouri	6	3	[10]

Semifinals
1	(United States) E King (United States) R Stalder	6	3	[8]
Alt	(United States) N Bybel (United States) O Crawford	2	6	[10]
3	(United States) C Harrison (Latvia) M Lībietis	3	4
2	(United Kingdom) L Johnson (Tunisia) S Mansouri	6	6

Final
Alt	(United States) N Bybel (United States) O Crawford	4	4
2	(United Kingdom) L Johnson (Tunisia) S Mansouri	6	6
