= 2022 LTP Men's Open – Singles =

Singles
- 2022 LTP Men's Open

Events
Singles	Doubles
LTP Men's Open	· 2023 →

This was the first edition of the tournament. The tournament was canceled after completion of play on September 28 due to the forecasted impacts of Hurricane Ian on South Carolina.

== Seeds ==
1. (Australia) Jordan Thompson
2. (United States) Stefan Kozlov (withdrew)
3. (Switzerland) Dominic Stricker (first round)
4. (Argentina) Juan Pablo Ficovich (second round)
5. (United States) Michael Mmoh
6. (Argentina) Facundo Mena
7. (Germany) Dominik Koepfer (withdrew)
8. (United States) Emilio Nava (first round)

== Draw ==
Key

- Q = Qualifier
- WC = Wild card
- LL = Lucky loser
- Alt = Alternate
- ITF = ITF entry
- PR = Protected ranking
- SR = Special ranking
- SE = Special exempt
- JE = Junior exempt
- JR = Junior Accelerator Programme entrant
- CO = College Accelerator Programme entrant
- NG = Next Gen Accelerator Program entrant
- w/o = Walkover
- r = Retired
- d = Defaulted

=== Finals ===
Semifinals
(United States)

Final

=== Top half ===
First round
1	(Australia) J Thompson	6	6
(Canada) A Galarneau	1	4
(Germany) S Fanselow	6	3	3
WC	(United States) E Quinn	4	6	6
Q	(Italy) G Oradini	5	6	6
(United States) E Escobedo	7	4	3
WC	(United States) Gianni Ross	3	7	1
Q	(United States) G Johns	6	5	6
4	(Argentina) JP Ficovich	6	7
Alt	(United Kingdom) C Broom	3	5
(France) E Couacaud	6^{7}	6^{1}
(United States) Z Svajda	7^{9}	7^{7}
Q	(United States) D Young	2	6	6
LL	(United States) O Kumar	6	2	1
LL	(United States) G Nanda	5	6	7
8	(United States) E Nava	7	2	5

Second round
1	(Australia) J Thompson	6	2	6
WC	(United States) E Quinn	2	6	3
Q	(Italy) G Oradini	6	6
Q	(United States) G Johns	3	3
4	(Argentina) JP Ficovich	3	5
(United States) Z Svajda	6	7
Q	(United States) D Young	1	6	6
LL	(United States) G Nanda	6	2	2

Quarterfinals
1	(Australia) J Thompson
Q	(Italy) G Oradini
(United States) Z Svajda
Q	(United States) D Young

Semifinals
(United States)

=== Bottom half ===
First round
5	(United States) M Mmoh	6	6
LL	(United States) T Sandgren	1	2
Alt	(United Kingdom) A McHugh	4	3
Q	(Denmark) A Holmgren	6	6
(United States) M Krueger	5	6	2
(United Kingdom) P Jubb	7	4	6
(Colombia) N Mejía	6	6
3	(Switzerland) D Stricker	1	3
6	(Argentina) F Mena	7	6
(Monaco) V Vacherot	5	4
Q	(United States) S Kirchheimer	1	0
(Switzerland) L Riedi	6	6
(Ecuador) R Quiroz	6	7
WC	(United States) C Kingsley	4	5
(United States) E Zhu	5	2
Q	(United States) P Kypson	7	6

Second round
5	(United States) M Mmoh
Q	(Denmark) A Holmgren
(United Kingdom) P Jubb
(Colombia) N Mejía
6	(Argentina) F Mena
(Switzerland) L Riedi
(Ecuador) R Quiroz
Q	(United States) P Kypson

Quarterfinals

Semifinals
