= 2024 LTP Men's Open – Doubles =

Doubles
- 2024 LTP Men's Open

Final
- Champions: (Australia) Luke Saville (Australia) Tristan Schoolkate
- Runners-up: (Australia) Calum Puttergill (Australia) Dane Sweeny
- Score: 6–7^{(3–7)}, 6–1, [10–3]

Events
Singles	Doubles
← 2023 ·	LTP Men's Open	· 2025 →

Luke Johnson and Skander Mansouri were the defending champions but chose not to defend their title.

Luke Saville and Tristan Schoolkate won the title after defeating Calum Puttergill and Dane Sweeny 6–7^{(3–7)}, 6–1, [10–3] in the final.

== Seeds ==
1. (Mexico) Hans Hach Verdugo / (Japan) James Trotter (quarterfinals)
2. (Australia) Luke Saville / (Australia) Tristan Schoolkate (champions)
3. (United States) Christian Harrison / (United States) JJ Tracy (first round)
4. (United States) Trey Hilderbrand / (United States) Alex Lawson (quarterfinals)

== Draw ==
Key

- Q = Qualifier
- WC = Wild card
- LL = Lucky loser
- Alt = Alternate
- ITF = ITF entry
- PR = Protected ranking
- SR = Special ranking
- SE = Special exempt
- JE = Junior exempt
- JR = Junior Accelerator Programme entrant
- CO = College Accelerator Programme entrant
- NG = Next Gen Accelerator Program entrant
- w/o = Walkover
- r = Retired
- d = Defaulted

=== Draw ===
First round
1	(Mexico) H Hach Verdugo (Japan) J Trotter	6	3	[10]
(United States) C Kingsley (Canada) K Stevenson	4	6	[6]
(Australia) P Harper (United States) P Trhac	5	4
(Ecuador) A Andrade (Jordan) A Shelbayh	7	6
4	(United States) T Hilderbrand (United States) A Lawson	6	6
WC	(United States) A Martin (United States) W Woodall	4	4
(Australia) C Puttergill (Australia) D Sweeny	2	7	[10]
(Australia) K Pearson (United States) J Sheehy	6	5	[6]
(Switzerland) R Bertola (Switzerland) D Stricker	7	0	[4]
(United States) M Kiger (Canada) B Sigouin	5	6	[10]
WC	(United States) E Spizzirri (United States) T Zink	6	7^{7}
3	(United States) C Harrison (United States) JJ Tracy	2	6^{4}
(Brazil) Gabriel Roveri Sidney (United States) Tennyson Whiting	6	7^{7}
(Canada) A Galarneau (United States) B Holt	4	6^{5}
(United Kingdom) R Peniston (United Kingdom) D Stevenson	6	3	[7]
2	(Australia) L Saville (Australia) T Schoolkate	4	6	[10]

Quarterfinals
1	(Mexico) H Hach Verdugo (Japan) J Trotter	5	3
(Ecuador) A Andrade (Jordan) A Shelbayh	7	6
4	(United States) T Hilderbrand (United States) A Lawson	7^{7}	6^{3}	[7]
(Australia) C Puttergill (Australia) D Sweeny	6^{2}	7^{7}	[10]
(United States) M Kiger (Canada) B Sigouin	2	0
WC	(United States) E Spizzirri (United States) T Zink	6	6
(Brazil) G Roveri Sidney (United States) T Whiting	2	6^{10}
2	(Australia) L Saville (Australia) T Schoolkate	6	7^{12}

Semifinals
(Ecuador) A Andrade (Jordan) A Shelbayh	5	4
(Australia) C Puttergill (Australia) D Sweeny	7	6
WC	(United States) E Spizzirri (United States) T Zink	4	6	[5]
2	(Australia) L Saville (Australia) T Schoolkate	6	3	[10]

Final
(Australia) C Puttergill (Australia) D Sweeny	7^{7}	1	[3]
2	(Australia) L Saville (Australia) T Schoolkate	6^{3}	6	[10]
