= 2024 LTP Men's Open – Singles =

Singles
- 2024 LTP Men's Open

Final
- Champion: (Lithuania) Edas Butvilas
- Runner-up: (United States) Nishesh Basavareddy
- Score: 6–4, 6–3

Events
Singles	Doubles
← 2023 ·	LTP Men's Open	· 2025 →

Abdullah Shelbayh was the defending champion but lost in the second round to Alexis Galarneau.

Edas Butvilas won the title after defeating Nishesh Basavareddy 6–4, 6–3 in the final.

== Seeds ==
1. (United States) Christopher Eubanks (semifinals)
2. (United States) Learner Tien (quarterfinals)
3. (Australia) Tristan Schoolkate (second round)
4. (United States) J. J. Wolf (quarterfinals)
5. (United States) Denis Kudla (first round)
6. (United States) Patrick Kypson (withdrew)
7. (Jordan) Abdullah Shelbayh (second round)
8. (United States) Tristan Boyer (semifinals)
9. (United States) Brandon Holt (first round)

== Draw ==
=== Key ===
- Q = Qualifier
- WC = Wild card
- LL = Lucky loser
- Alt = Alternate
- ITF = ITF entry
- PR = Protected ranking
- SR = Special ranking
- SE = Special exempt
- JE = Junior exempt
- JR = Junior Accelerator Programme entrant
- CO = College Accelerator Programme entrant
- NG = Next Gen Accelerator Program entrant
- w/o = Walkover
- r = Retired
- d = Defaulted

=== Finals ===
Semifinals
1	(United States) Christopher Eubanks	4	6^{5}
(United States) Nishesh Basavareddy	6	7^{7}
LL	(Lithuania) Edas Butvilas	6	6
8	(United States) Tristan Boyer	4	3

Final
(United States) Nishesh Basavareddy	4	3
LL	(Lithuania) Edas Butvilas	6	6

=== Top half ===
First round
1	(United States) C Eubanks	6	6^{4}	6
Q	(Slovenia) B Artnak	4	7^{7}	3
(Ecuador) A Andrade	2	5
WC	(United States) A Martin	6	7
(Canada) A Galarneau	7^{7}	6
(United Kingdom) J Pinnington Jones	6^{5}	4
(United Kingdom) J Monday	5	3
7	(Jordan) A Shelbayh	7	6
4	(United States) JJ Wolf	6	6
(Australia) D Sweeny	4	0
Q	(United States) Felix Corwin	3	4
(Switzerland) D Stricker	6	6
Q	(United States) A Rybakov	6	4	4
(United States) N Basavareddy	4	6	6
(United States) E Quinn	7^{7}	7^{7}
9	(United States) B Holt	6^{4}	6^{5}

Second round
1	(United States) C Eubanks	6	6
WC	(United States) A Martin	3	2
(Canada) A Galarneau	6	6
7	(Jordan) A Shelbayh	3	0
4	(United States) JJ Wolf	6	3	7^{7}
(Switzerland) D Stricker	3	6	6^{1}
(United States) N Basavareddy	6	7
(United States) E Quinn	2	5

Quarterfinals
1	(United States) C Eubanks	6	3	6
(Canada) A Galarneau	4	6	2
4	(United States) JJ Wolf	5	2
(United States) N Basavareddy	7	6

Semifinals
1	(United States) C Eubanks	4	6^{5}
(United States) N Basavareddy	6	7^{7}

=== Bottom half ===
First round
5	(United States) D Kudla	4	6	6^{3}
(Australia) B Tomic	6	2	7^{7}
WC	(United States) Henry Lieberman	2	2
SE	(Japan) N Nakagawa	6	6
SE	(Japan) J Trotter	2	6	5
LL	(Lithuania) E Butvilas	6	2	7
Q	(United States) S Dostanic	0	6	1^{r}
3	(Australia) T Schoolkate	6	4	2
8	(United States) T Boyer	6	6
WC	(United States) Micah Braswell	3	2
(United States) A Mayo	4	7	4
(Switzerland) R Bertola	6	5	6
Q	(Mexico) E Escobedo	6	6
Q	(United States) G Nanda	2	4
(France) Jules Marie	1	2
2	(United States) L Tien	6	6

Second round
(Australia) B Tomic	6	6
SE	(Japan) N Nakagawa	1	3
LL	(Lithuania) E Butvilas	7^{9}	6
3	(Australia) T Schoolkate	6^{7}	4
8	(United States) T Boyer	6	6
(Switzerland) R Bertola	3	2
Q	(Mexico) E Escobedo
2	(United States) L Tien	w/o

Quarterfinals
(Australia) B Tomic	6	3	2
LL	(Lithuania) E Butvilas	3	6	6
8	(United States) T Boyer	7^{8}	2	6
2	(United States) L Tien	6^{6}	6	3

Semifinals
LL	(Lithuania) E Butvilas	6	6
8	(United States) T Boyer	4	3
