= 2022 LTP Men's Open – Doubles =

Doubles
- 2022 LTP Men's Open

Events
| Singles | Doubles |
| LTP Men's Open | · 2023 → |

This was the first edition of the tournament. The tournament was canceled after completion of play on September 28 due to the forecasted impacts of Hurricane Ian on South Carolina.

== Seeds ==
1. (United Kingdom) Julian Cash / (United Kingdom) Henry Patten
2. (Australia) Andrew Harris / (Australia) Luke Saville
3. (Tunisia) Malek Jaziri / (Colombia) Nicolás Mejía
4. (United Kingdom) Aidan McHugh / (United States) Reese Stalder

== Draw ==
Key

- Q = Qualifier
- WC = Wild card
- LL = Lucky loser
- Alt = Alternate
- ITF = ITF entry
- PR = Protected ranking
- SR = Special ranking
- SE = Special exempt
- JE = Junior exempt
- JR = Junior Accelerator Programme entrant
- CO = College Accelerator Programme entrant
- NG = Next Gen Accelerator Program entrant
- w/o = Walkover
- r = Retired
- d = Defaulted

First round
1 | (United Kingdom) J Cash (United Kingdom) H Patten | 6 | 6
(United States) Christian Langmo (Italy) G Oradini | 2 | 2
(Spain) C Gómez-Herrera (Argentina) F Mena | 6 | 6
WC | (United States) Alec Fritzinger (United States) Carter Pate | 4 | 4
4 | (United Kingdom) A McHugh (United States) R Stalder | 1
(United States) N Chappell (United States) G Nanda | 0^{r}
(Germany) S Fanselow (Germany) T Sandkaulen | 3 | 6 | [10]
(United States) Ezekiel Clark (United States) E Zhu | 6 | 2 | [5]
(Switzerland) L Riedi (Monaco) V Vacherot | 4 | 4
(United States) E King (United States) M Krueger | 6 | 6
(United Kingdom) C Broom (Germany) C Frantzen | 6^{3} | 7^{7} | [7]
3 | (Tunisia) M Jaziri (Colombia) N Mejía | 7^{7} | 6^{4} | [10]
Alt | (Ghana) Abraham Asaba (United States) A Mayo | 6^{6} | 2
(Canada) A Galarneau (Philippines) R Gonzales | 7^{8} | 6
(France) E Couacaud (France) Maxime Mora | 2 | 4
2 | (Australia) A Harris (Australia) L Saville | 6 | 6

Quarterfinals
1 | (United Kingdom) J Cash (United Kingdom) H Patten
(Spain) C Gómez-Herrera (Argentina) F Mena
4 | (United Kingdom) A McHugh (United States) R Stalder
(Germany) S Fanselow (Germany) T Sandkaulen
(United States) E King (United States) M Krueger
3 | (Tunisia) M Jaziri (Colombia) N Mejía
(Canada) A Galarneau (Philippines) R Gonzales
2 | (Australia) A Harris (Australia) L Saville

Semifinals

Final
