= 2023 LTP Men's Open – Singles =

Singles
- 2023 LTP Men's Open

Final
- Champion: (Jordan) Abdullah Shelbayh
- Runner-up: (United States) Oliver Crawford
- Score: 6–2, 6–7^{(5–7)}, 6–3

Events
Singles	Doubles
← 2022 ·	LTP Men's Open	· 2024 →

There was no defending champion as the previous edition of the tournament was canceled due to Hurricane Ian.

Abdullah Shelbayh won the title after defeating Oliver Crawford 6–2, 6–7^{(5–7)}, 6–3 in the final. Shelbayh became the first Jordanian player to win a Challenger title.

== Seeds ==
1. (France) Enzo Couacaud (second round)
2. (Ecuador) Emilio Gómez (withdrew)
3. (Canada) Vasek Pospisil (first round)
4. (United States) Tennys Sandgren (first round)
5. (Canada) Alexis Galarneau (first round)
6. (Australia) Adam Walton (quarterfinals)
7. (United States) Denis Kudla (quarterfinals)
8. (Switzerland) Alexander Ritschard (first round)

== Draw ==
Key

- Q = Qualifier
- WC = Wild card
- LL = Lucky loser
- Alt = Alternate
- ITF = ITF entry
- PR = Protected ranking
- SR = Special ranking
- SE = Special exempt
- JE = Junior exempt
- JR = Junior Accelerator Programme entrant
- CO = College Accelerator Programme entrant
- NG = Next Gen Accelerator Program entrant
- w/o = Walkover
- r = Retired
- d = Defaulted

=== Finals ===
Semifinals
Q	(Mexico) Ernesto Escobedo	4	1^{r}
WC	(United States) Oliver Crawford	6	2
(Jordan) Abdullah Shelbayh	4	6	6
(United Kingdom) Ryan Peniston	6	4	3

Final
WC	(United States) Oliver Crawford	2	7^{7}	3
(Jordan) Abdullah Shelbayh	6	6^{5}	6

=== Top half ===
First round
1	(France) E Couacaud	6	4	6
(Croatia) M Poljičak	3	6	3
Q	(Mexico) E Escobedo	6	5	7^{7}
(Australia) B Tomic	3	7	6^{3}
(France) G Mpetshi Perricard	4	6^{4}
WC	(United States) G Johns	6	7^{7}
(Australia) T Schoolkate	4	5
7	(United States) D Kudla	6	7
4	(United States) T Sandgren	5	2
WC	(United States) O Crawford	7	6
(France) L Lokoli	6	7
(United States) M Krueger	4	5
Q	(United States) S Kirchheimer	6^{4}	6	4
WC	(United States) T Kodat	7^{7}	3	1^{r}
Q	(United States) S Dostanic	6	6
8	(Switzerland) A Ritschard	4	4

Second round
1	(France) E Couacaud	6^{6}	5
Q	(Mexico) E Escobedo	7^{8}	7
WC	(United States) G Johns	3	3
7	(United States) D Kudla	6	6
WC	(United States) O Crawford	7^{8}	6
(France) L Lokoli	6^{6}	2
Q	(United States) S Kirchheimer	6^{3}	3
Q	(United States) S Dostanic	7^{7}	6

Quarterfinals
Q	(Mexico) E Escobedo	6	7^{7}
7	(United States) D Kudla	3	6^{3}
WC	(United States) O Crawford	6	6
Q	(United States) S Dostanic	1	2

Semifinals
Q	(Mexico) E Escobedo	4	1^{r}
WC	(United States) O Crawford	6	2

=== Bottom half ===
First round
5	(Canada) A Galarneau	2	6^{5}
(United States) E Quinn	6	7^{7}
(Belgium) M Geerts	4	6^{6}
Q	(United States) A Mayo	6	7^{8}
(Estonia) M Lajal	6	4	4
(Jordan) A Shelbayh	1	6	6
(United States) B Holt	6	6
3	(Canada) V Pospisil	1	3
6	(Australia) A Walton	7^{7}	6
LL	(Tunisia) S Mansouri	6^{5}	2
(Tunisia) A Dougaz	6	6
Q	(Denmark) A Holmgren	3	4
(United States) P Kypson	2	4
(United Kingdom) R Peniston	6	6
PR	(United States) C Harrison	6^{6}	7^{7}	6
Q	(United States) T-S Kwiatkowski	7^{8}	6^{1}	2

Second round
(United States) E Quinn	7	7
Q	(United States) A Mayo	5	5
(Jordan) A Shelbayh	7	7
(United States) B Holt	5	5
6	(Australia) A Walton	6	7^{7}
(Tunisia) A Dougaz	3	6^{4}
(United Kingdom) R Peniston	6	6
PR	(United States) C Harrison	2	3

Quarterfinals
(United States) E Quinn	2	4
(Jordan) A Shelbayh	6	6
6	(Australia) A Walton	5	6	3
(United Kingdom) R Peniston	7	1	6

Semifinals
(Jordan) A Shelbayh	4	6	6
(United Kingdom) R Peniston	6	4	3
