= 2022 LTP Men's Open =

- Date: September 26 – October 2
- Edition: 1st
- Surface: Hard
- Location: Charleston, United States

Champions

Singles
- no champion

Doubles
- no champions
| LTP Men's Open | · 2023 → |

The 2022 LTP Men's Open was a professional tennis tournament played on hardcourts in Charleston, United States. It was the first edition of the tournament and was organized as an event on the 2022 ATP Challenger Tour. It was scheduled to be played between September 26 and October 2, 2022, but the tournament was canceled after completion of play on September 28 due to the forecasted impacts of Hurricane Ian on South Carolina. All players received the ranking points and prize money they would have earned for the rounds they reached.

== Singles main-draw entrants ==
=== Seeds ===
| Country | Player | Rank^{1} | Seed |
|---|---|---|---|
| AUS | Jordan Thompson | 98 | 1 |
| ~~USA~~ | ~~Stefan Kozlov~~ | ~~108~~ | ~~2~~ |
| SUI | Dominic Stricker | 126 | 3 |
| ARG | Juan Pablo Ficovich | 129 | 4 |
| USA | Michael Mmoh | 133 | 5 |
| ARG | Facundo Mena | 151 | 6 |
| ~~GER~~ | ~~Dominik Koepfer~~ | ~~165~~ | ~~7~~ |
| USA | Emilio Nava | 173 | 8 |

- ^{1} Rankings are as of 19 September 2022.

=== Other entrants ===
The following players received wildcards into the singles main draw:

- (United States) Cannon Kingsley
- (United States) Ethan Quinn
- (United States) Gianni Ross

The following player received entry into the singles main draw using a protected ranking:

- (Australia) ~~Andrew Harris~~

The following players received entry into the singles main draw as alternates:

- (United Kingdom) Charles Broom
- (United Kingdom) Aidan McHugh

The following players received entry from the qualifying draw:

- (Denmark) August Holmgren
- (United States) Garrett Johns
- (United States) Strong Kirchheimer
- (United States) Patrick Kypson
- (Italy) Giovanni Oradini
- (United States) Donald Young

The following players received entry as lucky losers:

- (United States) Omni Kumar
- (United States) Govind Nanda
- (United States) Tennys Sandgren

== Champions ==
=== Singles ===
- tournament canceled after first round

=== Doubles ===
- tournament canceled after first round
