= 2023 LTP Men's Open =

- Date: 25 September – 1 October
- Edition: 2nd
- Surface: Hard
- Location: Charleston, United States

Champions

Singles
- (Jordan) Abdullah Shelbayh

Doubles
- (United Kingdom) Luke Johnson / (Tunisia) Skander Mansouri
| ← 2022 · | LTP Men's Open | · 2024 → |

The 2023 LTP Men's Open was a professional tennis tournament played on hardcourts. It was the second edition of the tournament which was part of the 2023 ATP Challenger Tour. It took place in Charleston, United States between September 25 and October 1, 2023.

== Singles main-draw entrants ==
=== Seeds ===
| Country | Player | Rank^{1} | Seed |
|---|---|---|---|
| FRA | Enzo Couacaud | 178 | 1 |
| ~~ECU~~ | ~~Emilio Gómez~~ | ~~187~~ | ~~2~~ |
| CAN | Vasek Pospisil | 188 | 3 |
| USA | Tennys Sandgren | 197 | 4 |
| CAN | Alexis Galarneau | 202 | 5 |
| AUS | Adam Walton | 204 | 6 |
| USA | Denis Kudla | 205 | 7 |
| SUI | Alexander Ritschard | 212 | 8 |

- ^{1} Rankings are as of 18 September 2023.

=== Other entrants ===
The following players received wildcards into the singles main draw:

- (United States) Oliver Crawford
- (United States) Garrett Johns
- (United States) Toby Kodat

The following player received entry into the singles main draw using a protected ranking:

- (United States) Christian Harrison

The following players received entry from the qualifying draw:

- (United States) Stefan Dostanic
- (Mexico) Ernesto Escobedo
- (Denmark) August Holmgren
- (United States) Strong Kirchheimer
- (United States) Thai-Son Kwiatkowski
- (United States) Aidan Mayo

The following player received entry as a lucky loser:

- (Tunisia) Skander Mansouri

== Champions ==
=== Singles ===
- (Jordan) Abdullah Shelbayh def. (United States) Oliver Crawford 6–2, 6–7^{(5–7)}, 6–3.

=== Doubles ===
- (United Kingdom) Luke Johnson / (Tunisia) Skander Mansouri def. (United States) Nicholas Bybel / (United States) Oliver Crawford 6–4, 6–4.
