= 2025 Crete Challenger – Doubles =

Doubles
- 2025 Crete Challenger

Final
- Champions: (Bolivia) Juan Carlos Prado Ángelo (United Kingdom) Mark Whitehouse
- Runners-up: (Austria) Dennis Novak (Hungary) Zsombor Piros
- Score: 7–6^{(9–7)}, 6–2

Events
Singles	Doubles
- Crete Challenger

This was the first edition of the tournament.

Juan Carlos Prado Ángelo and Mark Whitehouse won the title after defeating Dennis Novak and Zsombor Piros 7–6^{(9–7)}, 6–2 in the final.

== Seeds ==
1. (Peru) Alexander Merino / (Germany) Christoph Negritu (first round)
2. (Italy) Filippo Romano / (Italy) Augusto Virgili (quarterfinals)
3. (Bulgaria) Anthony Genov / (Poland) Szymon Kielan (first round)
4. (Sweden) Erik Grevelius / (Sweden) Adam Heinonen (first round)

== Draw ==
Key

- Q = Qualifier
- WC = Wild card
- LL = Lucky loser
- Alt = Alternate
- ITF = ITF entry
- PR = Protected ranking
- SR = Special ranking
- SE = Special exempt
- JE = Junior exempt
- JR = Junior Accelerator Programme entrant
- CO = College Accelerator Programme entrant
- NG = Next Gen Accelerator Program entrant
- w/o = Walkover
- r = Retired
- d = Defaulted

=== Draw ===
First round
1	(Peru) A Merino (Germany) C Negritu	5	1
(Bulgaria) D Kuzmanov (Kazakhstan) T Skatov	7	6
(Lithuania) R Berankis (Lithuania) E Butvilas	7	4	[10]
WC	(Greece) Christos Antonopoulos (Greece) Dimitris Azoidis	5	6	[7]
4	(Sweden) E Grevelius (Sweden) A Heinonen	5	6	[8]
(Austria) D Novak (Hungary) Z Piros	7	3	[10]
(Luxembourg) C Rodesch (Colombia) A Soriano Barrera	6	4	[10]
(Slovakia) N Gombos (Slovakia) M Karol	3	6	[8]
(Spain) J Barranco Cosano (Spain) N Sánchez Izquierdo	3	3
(Greece) S Sakellaridis (Greece) Pe Tsitsipas	6	6
Alt	(Bolivia) JC Prado Ángelo (United Kingdom) M Whitehouse	3	6	[10]
3	(Bulgaria) A Genov (Poland) S Kielan	6	3	[7]
WC	(Germany) Henri Haupt (Greece) Pa Tsitsipas	2	6^{4}
(France) A Géa (Turkey) E Kırkın	6	7^{7}
(Uzbekistan) K Sultanov (Ukraine) V Uzhylovskyi	5	6^{4}
2	(Italy) F Romano (Italy) Augusto Virgili	7	7^{7}

Quarterfinals
(Bulgaria) D Kuzmanov (Kazakhstan) T Skatov	6^{5}	3
(Lithuania) R Berankis (Lithuania) E Butvilas	7^{7}	6
(Austria) D Novak (Hungary) Z Piros	7^{7}	6
(Luxembourg) C Rodesch (Colombia) A Soriano Barrera	6^{4}	3
(Greece) S Sakellaridis (Greece) Pe Tsitsipas	2	6	[7]
Alt	(Bolivia) JC Prado Ángelo (United Kingdom) M Whitehouse	6	3	[10]
(France) A Géa (Turkey) E Kırkın	5	6	[10]
2	(Italy) F Romano (Italy) A Virgili	7	4	[4]

Semifinals
(Lithuania) R Berankis (Lithuania) E Butvilas
(Austria) D Novak (Hungary) Z Piros	w/o
Alt	(Bolivia) JC Prado Ángelo (United Kingdom) M Whitehouse	7^{7}	6
(France) A Géa (Turkey) E Kırkın	6^{1}	2

Final
(Austria) D Novak (Hungary) Z Piros	6^{7}	2
Alt	(Bolivia) JC Prado Ángelo (United Kingdom) M Whitehouse	7^{9}	6
