= 2024 LTP Men's Open =

- Date: 23 – 29 September
- Edition: 3rd
- Surface: Hard
- Location: Charleston, United States

Champions

Singles
- (Lithuania) Edas Butvilas

Doubles
- (Australia) Luke Saville / (Australia) Tristan Schoolkate
← 2023 ·	LTP Men's Open	· 2025 →

The 2024 LTP Men's Open was a professional tennis tournament played on hardcourts. It was the third edition of the tournament which was part of the 2024 ATP Challenger Tour. It took place in Charleston, United States between September 23 and September 29, 2024.

== Singles main-draw entrants ==
=== Seeds ===
Country	Player	Rank^{1}	Seed
USA	Christopher Eubanks	116	1
USA	Learner Tien	151	2
AUS	Tristan Schoolkate	168	3
USA	J. J. Wolf	170	4
USA	Denis Kudla	181	5
~~USA~~	~~Patrick Kypson~~	~~186~~	~~6~~
JOR	Abdullah Shelbayh	193	7
USA	Tristan Boyer	200	8
USA	Brandon Holt	205	9

- ^{1} Rankings are as of 16 September 2024.

=== Other entrants ===
The following players received wildcards into the singles main draw:

- (United States) Micah Braswell
- (United States) Henry Lieberman
- (United States) Andres Martin

The following players received entry into the singles main draw as special exempts:

- (Japan) Naoki Nakagawa
- (Japan) James Trotter

The following players received entry from the qualifying draw:

- (Slovenia) Bor Artnak
- (United States) Felix Corwin
- (United States) Stefan Dostanic
- (Mexico) Ernesto Escobedo
- (United States) Govind Nanda
- (United States) Alex Rybakov

The following player received entry as a lucky loser:

- (Lithuania) Edas Butvilas

== Champions ==
=== Singles ===
- (Lithuania) Edas Butvilas def. (United States) Nishesh Basavareddy 6–4, 6–3.

=== Doubles ===
- (Australia) Luke Saville / (Australia) Tristan Schoolkate def. (Australia) Calum Puttergill / (Australia) Dane Sweeny 6–7^{(3–7)}, 6–1, [10–3].
