= 2026 Knoxville Challenger – Singles =

Singles
- 2026 Knoxville Challenger

Final
- Champion: (France) Clément Chidekh
- Runner-up: (Jordan) Abdullah Shelbayh
- Score: 6–1, 2–0 ret.

Events
| Singles | Doubles |
- Knoxville Challenger

Mitchell Krueger was the defending champion but lost in the qualifying competition to Lui Maxted.

Clément Chidekh won the title after Abdullah Shelbayh retired trailing 1–6, 0–2 in the final.

== Seeds ==
1. (United States) Marcos Giron (second round)
2. (United States) Michael Zheng (semifinals)
3. (Colombia) Nicolás Mejía (second round)
4. (France) Clément Chidekh (champion)
5. (United States) Darwin Blanch (first round)
6. (United States) Michael Mmoh (second round)
7. (Canada) Liam Draxl (quarterfinals)
8. (Canada) Alexis Galarneau (first round)

== Draw ==
Key

- Q = Qualifier
- WC = Wild card
- LL = Lucky loser
- Alt = Alternate
- ITF = ITF entry
- PR = Protected ranking
- SR = Special ranking
- SE = Special exempt
- JE = Junior exempt
- JR = Junior Accelerator Programme entrant
- CO = College Accelerator Programme entrant
- NG = Next Gen Accelerator Program entrant
- w/o = Walkover
- r = Retired
- d = Defaulted

=== Finals ===
Semifinals
Alt | (Jordan) Abdullah Shelbayh | 7^{8} | 6
Q | (United States) Daniel Milavsky | 6^{6} | 3
4 | (France) Clément Chidekh | 3 | 6 | 7
2 | (United States) Michael Zheng | 6 | 3 | 5

Final
Alt | (Jordan) Abdullah Shelbayh | 1 | 0^{r}
4 | (France) Clément Chidekh | 6 | 2

=== Top half ===
First round
1/WC | (United States) M Giron | 7^{7} | 2 | 6
(Poland) M Kaśnikowski | 6^{2} | 6 | 2
Alt | (Jordan) A Shelbayh | 6 | 6
(United Kingdom) H Wendelken | 4 | 3
WC | (Israel) Orel Kimhi | 3 | 4
Q | (Slovenia) Filip Jeff Planinšek | 6 | 6
(United Kingdom) A Gray | 6 | 6
5 | (United States) Dar Blanch | 2 | 3
3 | (Colombia) N Mejía | 6 | 6
JR | (United States) J Kennedy | 3 | 1
NG | (United States) T Svajda | 4 | 4
(Germany) MH Rehberg | 6 | 6
Q | (United States) D Milavsky | 6 | 6
(United States) M Cassone | 1 | 4
SE | (United States) A Mayo | 2 | 4
6 | (United States) M Mmoh | 6 | 6

Second round
1/WC | (United States) M Giron | 3 | 6 | 6^{5}
Alt | (Jordan) A Shelbayh | 6 | 3 | 7^{7}
Q | (Slovenia) FJ Planinšek | 6^{4} | 4
(United Kingdom) A Gray | 7^{7} | 6
3 | (Colombia) N Mejía | 3 | 5
(Germany) MH Rehberg | 6 | 7
Q | (United States) D Milavsky | 6 | 7^{7}
6 | (United States) M Mmoh | 2 | 6^{2}

Quarterfinals
Alt | (Jordan) A Shelbayh | 6 | 6
(United Kingdom) A Gray | 4 | 4
(Germany) MH Rehberg | 3 | 6 | 5
Q | (United States) D Milavsky | 6 | 1 | 7

Semifinals
Alt | (Jordan) A Shelbayh | 7^{8} | 6
Q | (United States) D Milavsky | 6^{6} | 3

=== Bottom half ===
First round
7 | (Canada) L Draxl | 6 | 6
CO | (Canada) D Chan | 4 | 3
(Bulgaria) P Nesterov | 6 | 2 | 6
Q | (France) T Legout | 2 | 6 | 4
Q | (United Kingdom) L Maxted | 6^{6} | 6 | 6
(Czech Republic) H Bartoň | 7^{8} | 3 | 4
WC | (United States) M Latak | 6^{4} | 4
4 | (France) C Chidekh | 7^{7} | 6
8 | (Canada) A Galarneau | 3 | 6^{4}
(United States) S Kozlov | 6 | 7^{7}
(United States) B Shick | 1 | 6 | 6
LL | (Japan) Kenta Miyoshi | 6 | 4 | 4
Q | (United States) O Baris | 6 | 6
Alt | (United Kingdom) O Tarvet | 4 | 4
Q | (United Kingdom) G Hussey | 6 | 4 | 4
2 | (United States) M Zheng | 2 | 6 | 6

Second round
7 | (Canada) L Draxl | 6 | 6
(Bulgaria) P Nesterov | 3 | 3
Q | (United Kingdom) L Maxted | 6^{4} | 3
4 | (France) C Chidekh | 7^{7} | 6
(United States) S Kozlov | 6 | 6
(United States) B Shick | 3 | 3
Q | (United States) O Baris | 1 | 5
2 | (United States) M Zheng | 6 | 7

Quarterfinals
7 | (Canada) L Draxl | 4 | 6 | 2
4 | (France) C Chidekh | 6 | 0 | 6
(United States) S Kozlov | 3 | 5
2 | (United States) M Zheng | 6 | 7

Semifinals
4 | (France) C Chidekh | 3 | 6 | 7
2 | (United States) M Zheng | 6 | 3 | 5
