= 2025 Crete Challenger – Singles =

Singles
- 2025 Crete Challenger

Final
- Champion: (Lithuania) Edas Butvilas
- Runner-up: (United Kingdom) Stuart Parker
- Score: 6–3, 6–3

Events
Singles	Doubles
- Crete Challenger

This was the first edition of the tournament.

Edas Butvilas won the title after defeating Stuart Parker 6–3, 6–3 in the final.

== Seeds ==
1. (Kazakhstan) Timofey Skatov (second round)
2. (Uzbekistan) Khumoyun Sultanov (second round)
3. (Chinese Taipei) Wu Tung-lin (first round)
4. (Lithuania) Edas Butvilas (champion)
5. (Spain) Javier Barranco Cosano (second round)
6. (Luxembourg) Chris Rodesch (second round)
7. (Hungary) Zsombor Piros (semifinals)
8. (Italy) Lorenzo Giustino (second round)

== Draw ==
Key

- Q = Qualifier
- WC = Wild card
- LL = Lucky loser
- Alt = Alternate
- ITF = ITF entry
- PR = Protected ranking
- SR = Special ranking
- SE = Special exempt
- JE = Junior exempt
- JR = Junior Accelerator Programme entrant
- CO = College Accelerator Programme entrant
- NG = Next Gen Accelerator Program entrant
- w/o = Walkover
- r = Retired
- d = Defaulted

=== Finals ===
Semifinals
7	(Hungary) Zsombor Piros	6	4	3
4	(Lithuania) Edas Butvilas	4	6	6
Q	(United Kingdom) Stuart Parker	6	7
Q	(United Kingdom) Ryan Peniston	2	5

Final
4	(Lithuania) Edas Butvilas	6	6
Q	(United Kingdom) Stuart Parker	3	3

=== Top half ===
First round
1	(Kazakhstan) T Skatov	6	6
(Czech Republic) J Veselý	4	4
WC	(Greece) Pa Tsitsipas	3	1
(Austria) D Novak	6	6
WC	(Greece) S Sakellaridis	6	6
(Bolivia) JC Prado Ángelo	2	4
(Netherlands) J Sels	4	1^{r}
7	(Hungary) Z Piros	6	3
4	(Lithuania) E Butvilas	6	6
Q	(United States) K Smith	1	4
(Australia) Matthew Dellavedova	3	2
(Germany) C Negritu	6	6
Q	(Slovakia) M Karol	3	2
(United Kingdom) H Searle	6	6
(Slovakia) M Kližan	3	0
5	(Spain) J Barranco Cosano	6	6

Second round
1	(Kazakhstan) T Skatov	4	6	3
(Austria) D Novak	6	3	6
WC	(Greece) S Sakellaridis	2	6^{8}
7	(Hungary) Z Piros	6	7^{10}
4	(Lithuania) E Butvilas	4	6	7^{7}
(Germany) C Negritu	6	3	6^{5}
(United Kingdom) H Searle	6	6
5	(Spain) J Barranco Cosano	3	4

Quarterfinals
(Austria) D Novak	6^{3}	4
7	(Hungary) Z Piros	7^{7}	6
4	(Lithuania) E Butvilas	2	7	6
(United Kingdom) H Searle	6	5	2

Semifinals
7	(Hungary) Z Piros	6	4	3
4	(Lithuania) E Butvilas	4	6	6

=== Bottom half ===
First round
6	(Luxembourg) C Rodesch	6	6
(Turkey) E Kırkın	4	1
Q	(United Kingdom) S Parker	7	2	6
(Spain) N Sánchez Izquierdo	5	6	3
(France) A Géa	3	2
(Bulgaria) D Kuzmanov	6	6
(Lithuania) R Berankis	7^{7}	7
3	(Chinese Taipei) T-l Wu	6^{3}	5
8	(Italy) L Giustino	6	7
LL	(Italy) A Binda	3	5
(Croatia) D Prižmić	4	6^{3}
Q	A Karatsev	6	7^{7}
Q	(United Kingdom) R Peniston	6	6
(Colombia) A Soriano Barrera	4	4
Q	(Italy) Marcello Serafini	6^{6}	5
2	(Uzbekistan) K Sultanov	7^{8}	7

Second round
6	(Luxembourg) C Rodesch	4	4
Q	(United Kingdom) S Parker	6	6
(Bulgaria) D Kuzmanov	7	6
(Lithuania) R Berankis	5	4
8	(Italy) L Giustino	5	6	1
Q	A Karatsev	7	2	6
Q	(United Kingdom) R Peniston	6	6
2	(Uzbekistan) K Sultanov	4	2

Quarterfinals
Q	(United Kingdom) S Parker	6	6
(Bulgaria) D Kuzmanov	4	4
Q	A Karatsev	4	4
Q	(United Kingdom) R Peniston	6	6

Semifinals
Q	(United Kingdom) S Parker	6	7
Q	(United Kingdom) R Peniston	2	5
