= 2025 Crete Challenger =

- Date: 3 – 9 March
- Edition: 1st
- Surface: Hard
- Location: Hersonissos, Greece

Champions

Singles
- (Lithuania) Edas Butvilas

Doubles
- (Bolivia) Juan Carlos Prado Ángelo / (United Kingdom) Mark Whitehouse
- Crete Challenger

The 2025 Crete Challenger was a professional tennis tournament played on hardcourts. It was the first edition of the tournament which was part of the 2025 ATP Challenger Tour. It took place in Hersonissos, Greece between 3 and 9 March 2025.

== Singles main-draw entrants ==
=== Seeds ===
Country	Player	Rank^{1}	Seed
KAZ	Timofey Skatov	181	1
UZB	Khumoyun Sultanov	220	2
TPE	Wu Tung-lin	235	3
LTU	Edas Butvilas	236	4
ESP	Javier Barranco Cosano	249	5
LUX	Chris Rodesch	264	6
HUN	Zsombor Piros	265	7
ITA	Lorenzo Giustino	268	8

- ^{1} Rankings are as of 24 February 2025.

=== Other entrants ===
The following players received wildcards into the singles main draw:

- (Italy) ~~Federico Cinà~~
- (Greece) Stefanos Sakellaridis
- (Greece) Pavlos Tsitsipas

The following players received entry from the qualifying draw:

- Aslan Karatsev
- (Slovakia) Miloš Karol
- (United Kingdom) Stuart Parker
- (United Kingdom) Ryan Peniston
- (Italy) Marcello Serafini
- (United States) Keegan Smith

The following player received entry as a lucky loser:

- (Italy) Alexandr Binda

== Champions ==
=== Singles ===
- (Lithuania) Edas Butvilas def. (United Kingdom) Stuart Parker 6–3, 6–3.

=== Doubles ===
- (Bolivia) Juan Carlos Prado Ángelo / (United Kingdom) Mark Whitehouse def. (Austria) Dennis Novak / (Hungary) Zsombor Piros 7–6^{(9–7)}, 6–2.
