= 2023 Murcia Open – Doubles =

Doubles
- 2023 Murcia Open

Final
- Champions: (Spain) Daniel Rincón (Jordan) Abedallah Shelbayh
- Runners-up: (Italy) Marco Bortolotti (Spain) Sergio Martos Gornés
- Score: 7–6^{(7–3)}, 6–4

Events
Singles	Doubles
- Murcia Open

Íñigo Cervantes and Oriol Roca Batalla were the defending champions but withdrew before their match in the quarterfinals.

Daniel Rincón and Abedallah Shelbayh won the title after defeating Marco Bortolotti and Sergio Martos Gornés 7–6^{(7–3)}, 6–4 in the final.

== Seeds ==
1. (Finland) Patrik Niklas-Salminen / (Netherlands) Bart Stevens (semifinals)
2. (Italy) Marco Bortolotti / (Spain) Sergio Martos Gornés (final)
3. (South Korea) Nam Ji-sung / (South Korea) Song Min-kyu (first round)
4. (India) Arjun Kadhe / (Japan) Kaichi Uchida (quarterfinals)

== Draw ==
Key

- Q = Qualifier
- WC = Wild card
- LL = Lucky loser
- Alt = Alternate
- ITF = ITF entry
- PR = Protected ranking
- SR = Special ranking
- SE = Special exempt
- JE = Junior exempt
- JR = Junior Accelerator Programme entrant
- CO = College Accelerator Programme entrant
- NG = Next Gen Accelerator Program entrant
- w/o = Walkover
- r = Retired
- d = Defaulted

First round
1	(Finland) P Niklas-Salminen (Netherlands) B Stevens	6	6^{7}	[10]
(Norway) V Durasovic (New Zealand) A Sitak	3	7^{9}	[4]
Alt	(Brazil) D Dutra da Silva (Spain) Á López San Martín	6	7^{7}
(Switzerland) L Margaroli (Brazil) F Romboli	3	6^{3}
3	(South Korea) J-s Nam (South Korea) M-k Song	7	4	[4]
Alt	(Spain) D Rincón (Jordan) A Shelbayh	5	6	[10]
B Bobrov (Italy) L Giustino	3	4
(Belgium) M Geerts (Switzerland) A Ritschard	6	6
(Croatia) B Gojo; E Karlovskiy	6^{4}	5
(United Kingdom) B Harris (Australia) A Santillan	7^{7}	7
WC	(Spain) A Barroso Campos (Spain) P Llamas Ruiz	7	2	[13]
4	(India) A Kadhe (Japan) K Uchida	5	6	[15]
(Spain) Í Cervantes (Spain) O Roca Batalla	2	6	[13]
(Brazil) O Luz (Brazil) M Zormann	6	3	[11]
(Argentina) A Collarini (Belgium) K Coppejans	4	4
2	(Italy) M Bortolotti (Spain) S Martos Gornés	6	6

Quarterfinals
1	(Finland) P Niklas-Salminen (Netherlands) B Stevens	w/o
Alt	(Brazil) D Dutra da Silva (Spain) Á López San Martín
Alt	(Spain) D Rincón (Jordan) A Shelbayh	6^{4}	6	[12]
(Belgium) M Geerts (Switzerland) A Ritschard	7^{7}	4	[10]
(United Kingdom) B Harris (Australia) A Santillan	6^{5}	7	[10]
4	(India) A Kadhe (Japan) K Uchida	7^{7}	5	[6]
(Spain) Í Cervantes (Spain) O Roca Batalla
2	(Italy) M Bortolotti (Spain) S Martos Gornés	w/o

Semifinals
1	(Finland) P Niklas-Salminen (Netherlands) B Stevens	6	3	[4]
Alt	(Spain) D Rincón (Jordan) A Shelbayh	4	6	[10]
(United Kingdom) B Harris (Australia) A Santillan	4	6^{4}
2	(Italy) M Bortolotti (Spain) S Martos Gornés	6	7^{7}

Final
Alt	(Spain) D Rincón (Jordan) A Shelbayh	7^{7}	6
2	(Italy) M Bortolotti (Spain) S Martos Gornés	6^{3}	4
