= Hurricane Tax Relief Act =

United States legislation

- Long title: A bill to amend the Internal Revenue Code of 1986 to provide special rules for casualty losses incurred by reason of Hurricane Ian, Hurricane Nicole, and Hurricane Fiona.

Legislative history
- Introduced in the Senate as S. 764 by Rick Scott (R‑FL; on February 27, 2023 (118th Congress); Committee consideration by Finance

The Hurricane Tax Relief Act is pending United States legislation introduced in 2023. Introduced by Florida legislators Rick Scott in the Senate and Byron Donalds in the House of Representatives, and generally supported by Republicans holding political office in Florida, the act seeks to reduce the amount of federal taxes that victims of hurricanes Ian and Nicole will have to pay and more explicitly qualify Hurricane Ian as a disaster, which can qualify for tax write-offs. The bill additionally extends its protection to Puerto Ricans who suffered from Hurricane Fiona.

== Background ==
Southwest Florida was hardly hit by Hurricane Ian particularly during the 2022 Atlantic hurricane season; the storm, per an estimate from Moody's, caused $67 billion worth of damage. Scott and Donalds, both residents of Naples, proposed with Republican senator Marco Rubio a bill which would better serve. Generally, since 2020, legislation has been enacted which reduced tax bills for hurricane victims and natural disasters. While the technical ability to claim losses on hurricane damage was potential in its existence, Southwest Florida residents expressed confusion towards the ability. Congresspeople in Florida have foreshadowed a bill before the House and Senate was coming soon to more easily enable tax write-offs.

== Provisions ==
The bill modifies the deduction for personal casualty losses in the hurricane disaster area to eliminate a requirement for losses to exceed 10% of adjusted gross income to qualify for the deduction and the requirement to itemize. To achieve this, should the bill be passed, the Internal Revenue Code of 1986 will be modified in accordance. For defining the areas hit by Fiona, Ian, and Nicole, the legislation refers to the Stafford Disaster Relief and Emergency Assistance Act for defining the boundaries of the impact zones for each hurricane.

Puerto Rico will be under special rules regarding its tax cuts. For the purposes of the act, the territory will be under a "mirror code tax system", which the bill defines as the income tax system of Puerto Rico if the income tax liability of the residents of such possession under such system is determined by reference to the income tax laws of the United States as if such possession were the United States. For damages claimed in Puerto Rico, the US treasury will pay that equivalent amount to Puerto Rico.

== Legislative history and support ==
Donalds and Scott introduced the bill on March 23, 2023, as Senate Bill 764, with Marco Rubio joining as a senate cosponsor and Jenniffer González joining Donalds in the house. In his announcement, Scott stated that the last thing that his constituents and Puerto Ricans needed "as they recover from devastating storms like Ian, Nicole and Fiona is a big tax bill".

Numerous other Florida Republicans have come out in support of the bill. These include Representatives Scott Franklin, Mario Díaz-Balart, Gus Bilirakis, and Bill Posey.

== See also ==
- United States Congress hearing on Hurricane Ian
