= Edas Butvilas =

Lithuanian tennis player

- Butvilas at the 2026 Wimbledon Championships
- Country (sports): Lithuania
- Born: 23 July 2004 (age 22) Klaipėda, Lithuania
- Height: 1.91 m (6 ft 3 in)
- Plays: Right-handed (two-handed backhand)
- Coach: Iván Navarro
- Prize money: US $331,844

Singles
- Career record: 5–5 (at ATP Tour level, Grand Slam level, and in Davis Cup)
- Career titles: 0
- Highest ranking: No. 194 (14 September 2026)
- Current ranking: No. 194 (14 September 2026)

Grand Slam singles results
- French Open: Q1 (2025)
- Wimbledon: Q1 (2025, 2026)
- US Open: Q1 (2025)

Doubles
- Career record: 2–5 (at ATP Tour level, Grand Slam level, and in Davis Cup)
- Career titles: 0
- Highest ranking: No. 586 (16 October 2023)
- Current ranking: No. 671 (14 September 2026)
- Last updated on: 14 September 2026.

Edas Butvilas (born 23 July 2004) is a Lithuanian professional tennis player. He has a career-high ATP singles ranking of No. 194 achieved on 14 September 2026 and a best doubles ranking of No. 586, reached on 16 October 2023. He is currently the No. 2 singles player from Lithuania.

== Junior career ==
Butvilas had good results as a junior player. He won two major jr. doubles titles, at the 2021 Wimbledon and the 2022 French Open. He reached an ITF junior combined ranking of world No. 7 on 31 January 2022.

== Career ==
=== 2024-2025: Maiden Challenger title, top 205 ===
In September 2024, Butvilas won his maiden ATP Challenger title at the 2024 LTP Men's Open in Charleston, SC, after entering the main draw as a lucky loser. He defeated Nishesh Basavareddy in the final in straight sets.

Butvilas won his second title at the 2025 Crete Challenger and moved 33 positions up to world No. 201 in the rankings on 17 March 2025.

== ATP Challenger Tour finals ==
=== Singles: 3 (3 titles) ===
Legend ATP Challenger Tour (3–0)

Result	W–L	Date	Tournament	Tier	Surface	Opponent	Score
Win	1–0	Sep 2024	LTP Men's Open, US	Challenger	Hard	(United States) Nishesh Basavareddy	6–4, 6–3
Win	2–0	Mar 2025	Crete Challenger, Greece	Challenger	Hard	(United Kingdom) Stuart Parker	6–3, 6–3
Win	3–0	Aug 2026	Lexington Open, US	Challenger	Hard	(United States) Andre Ilagan	6–2, 1–6, 7–6^{(8–6)}

== ITF World Tennis Tour finals ==
=== Singles: 6 (2 titles, 4 runner-ups) ===
Legend ITF WTT (2–4)	Finals by surface Hard (1–3) Clay (1–1)

Result	W–L	Date	Tournament	Tier	Surface	Opponent	Score
Win	1–0	Jan 2023	M15 Vilnius, Lithuania	WTT	Hard	(Poland) Szymon Kielan	6–1, 7–5
Loss	1–1	Mar 2024	M15 Heraklion, Greece	WTT	Hard	(Slovakia) Martin Kližan	4–6, 3–6
Loss	1–2	Mar 2024	M15 Heraklion, Greece	WTT	Hard	(Australia) Jacob Bradshaw	6–7^{(3–7)}, 1–6
Win	2–2	May 2024	M15 Kursumlijska Banja, Serbia	WTT	Clay	(Australia) Matthew Dellavedova	6–4, 6–0
Loss	2–3	Jun 2024	M25 La Nucia, Spain	WTT	Clay	(Germany) Nicola Kuhn	6–7^{(3–7)}, 1–6
Loss	2–4	Aug 2024	M25 Idanha-a-Nova, Portugal	WTT	Hard	(Uzbekistan) Khumoyun Sultanov	4–6, 5–7

=== Doubles: 4 (2 titles, 2 runner-ups) ===
Legend ITF WTT (2–2)	Finals by surface Hard (1–0) Clay (1–2)

Result	W–L	Date	Tournament	Tier	Surface	Partner	Opponents	Score
Loss	0–1	Sep 2021	M15 Melilla, Spain	WTT	Clay	(Spain) Alejandro Manzanera Pertusa	(Chile) Miguel Fernando Pereira (Spain) Oscar Mesquida Berg	2–6, 7–6^{(7–3)}, [9–11]
Win	1–1	Nov 2022	M15 Benicarló, Spain	WTT	Clay	(Spain) Alejandro Manzanera Pertusa	(Switzerland) Noah Lopez (Spain) David Naharro	6–2, 6–2
Loss	1–2	May 2023	M15 Antalya, Turkey	WTT	Clay	(France) Gabriel Debru	(Argentina) Mateo del Pino (Argentina) Juan Manuel La Serna	2–6, 6–1, [9–11]
Win	2–2	Jan 2024	M15 Manacor, Spain	WTT	Hard	(Spain) Carlos López Montagud	Yaroslav Demin (Hong Kong) Coleman Wong	6–2, 7–6^{(8–6)}

== Junior Grand Slam finals ==
=== Doubles: 2 (2 titles) ===
Result	Year	Tournament	Surface	Partner	Opponents	Score
Win	2021	Wimbledon	Grass	(Spain) Alejandro Manzanera Pertusa	(Spain) Daniel Rincón (Jordan) Abedallah Shelbayh	6–3, 6–4
Win	2022	French Open	Clay	(Croatia) Mili Poljičak	(Peru) Gonzalo Bueno (Peru) Ignacio Buse	6–4, 6–0
