= LTP Men's Open =

Defunct tennis tournament
- Event name: LTP (Live to Play) Men's Open
- Location: Charleston, United States
- Category: ATP Challenger Tour
- Surface: Hard
- Prize money: $82,000
- Website: Website

The LTP Men's Open was a professional tennis tournament played on hardcourts. It was held in Charleston, United States and was part of the Association of Tennis Professionals (ATP) Challenger Tour in 2023 and in 2024.

== Past finals ==
=== Singles ===
Year	Champion	Runner-up	Score
2024	(Lithuania) Edas Butvilas	(United States) Nishesh Basavareddy	6–4, 6–3
2023	(Jordan) Abdullah Shelbayh	(United States) Oliver Crawford	6–2, 6–7^{(5–7)}, 6–3
2022	Canceled after first round due to Hurricane Ian		

=== Doubles ===
Year	Champions	Runners-up	Score
2024	(Australia) Luke Saville (Australia) Tristan Schoolkate	(Australia) Calum Puttergill (Australia) Dane Sweeny	6–7^{(3–7)}, 6–1, [10–3]
2023	(United Kingdom) Luke Johnson (Tunisia) Skander Mansouri	(United States) Nicholas Bybel (United States) Oliver Crawford	6–4, 6–4
2022	Canceled after first round due to Hurricane Ian		
