= Hurricane Ian =

Category 5 Atlantic hurricane in 2022

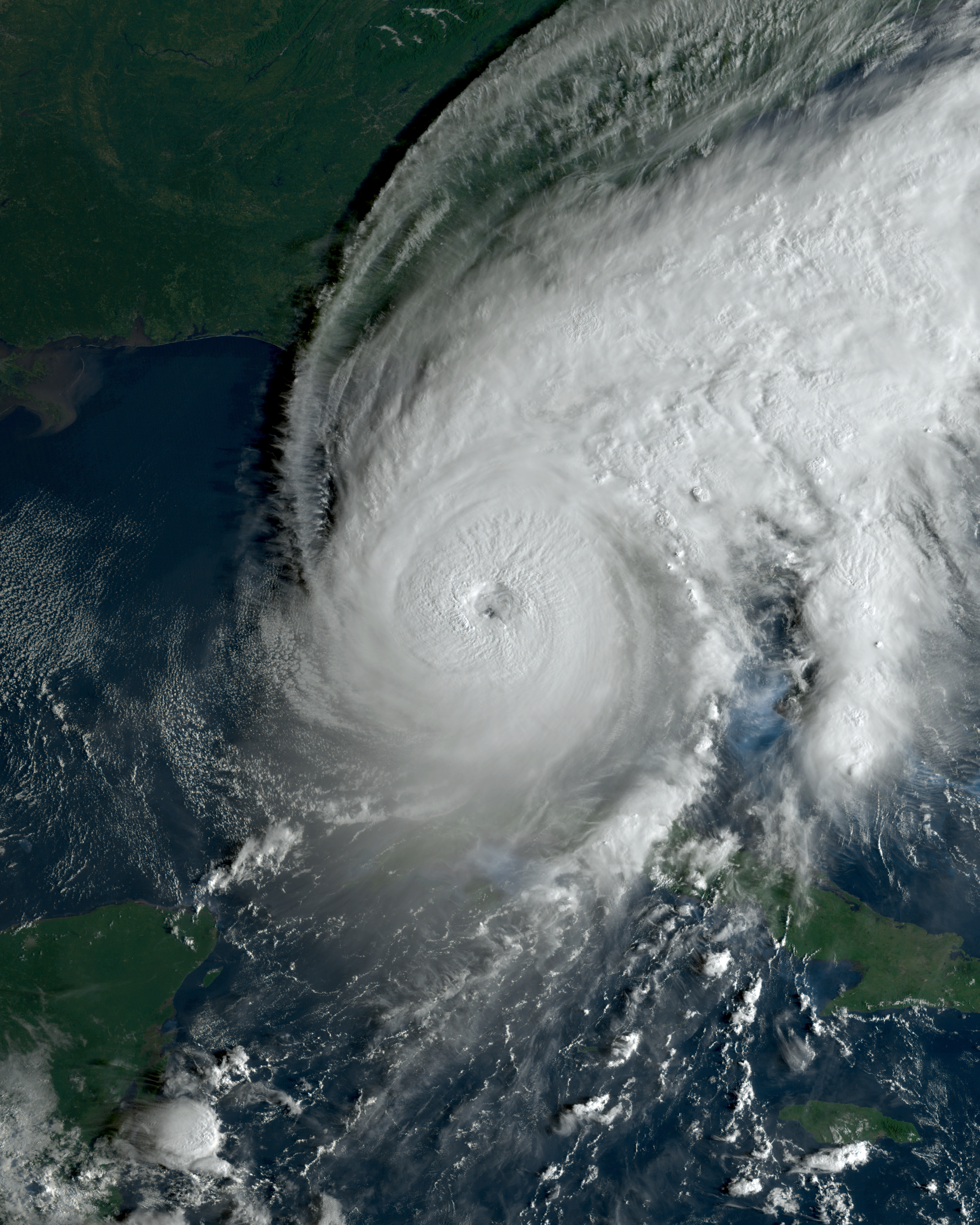
- Hurricane Ian at peak intensity while approaching Florida on September 28

Meteorological history
- Formed: September 23, 2022
- Extratropical: September 30, 2022
- Dissipated: October 1, 2022

Category 5 major hurricane
- 1-minute sustained (SSHWS/NWS)
- Highest winds: 160 mph (260 km/h)
- Lowest pressure: 937 mbar (hPa); 27.67 inHg

Overall effects
- Fatalities: 161 total
- Missing: 13
- Damage: $112 billion (2022 USD) (Third-costliest tropical cyclone on record; costliest in Florida history)
- Areas affected: Trinidad and Tobago, Venezuela, Colombia, ABC islands, Jamaica, Cayman Islands, Cuba, Southeast United States (especially Florida and the Carolinas)
- IBTrACS /
- Part of the 2022 Atlantic hurricane season
- Effects: Florida; Other wikis: Commons: Ian images

Hurricane Ian was a large and catastrophic tropical cyclone that became the third costliest weather disaster on record worldwide. It was also the deadliest hurricane to strike the state of Florida since the 1935 Labor Day hurricane, and the strongest hurricane to make landfall in Florida since Michael in 2018. Ian caused widespread damage across western Cuba, Florida, and the Carolinas. The ninth named storm, fourth hurricane, and second major hurricane of the 2022 Atlantic hurricane season, Ian was the first Category 5 hurricane in the Atlantic since Lorenzo in 2019.

Ian originated from a tropical wave that moved off the coast of West Africa and across the central tropical Atlantic towards the Windward Islands. The wave moved into the Caribbean Sea on September 21 bringing heavy rain and gusty winds to Trinidad and Tobago, the ABC islands, and the northern coast of South America. On the morning of September 23, the wave had enough organization to be designated as a tropical depression, after which it strengthened into Tropical Storm Ian early the next day while it was southeast of Jamaica. As Ian rapidly intensified into a Category 3 hurricane, it made landfall in western Cuba. Heavy rainfall caused widespread flooding across the area resulting in a nationwide power outage. Ian lost a minimal amount of strength while over land and soon re-strengthened while over the southeastern Gulf of Mexico. It peaked as a Category 5 hurricane with sustained winds of 160 mph (260 km/h) early on September 28, while progressing towards the west coast of Florida, and made landfall just below peak intensity in Southwest Florida on Cayo Costa Island. In doing so, Ian tied with several other storms to become the 5th-strongest hurricane on record to make landfall in the contiguous U.S. After moving inland, Ian quickly weakened to a tropical storm before moving back offshore into the Atlantic. There it re-strengthened to become a hurricane once again before making its final landfall in South Carolina on September 30. Ian became an extratropical cyclone shortly after landfall and fully dissipated by early the next day.

Hurricane Ian caused 161 fatalities: 5 in Cuba, 150 in Florida, (Note: The Charlotte County Sheriff's Office has claimed that 24 deaths have occurred. However, the Florida Medical Examiners Commission has only been able to verify 9 deaths from Ian.) 5 in North Carolina, and 1 in Virginia. Ian caused catastrophic damage with losses estimated to be around $112 billion, making it the costliest hurricane in Florida's history, surpassing Irma of 2017, as well as the third-costliest in U.S. history, behind only Katrina of 2005 and Harvey of 2017. Much of the damage was from flooding brought about by a storm surge of 10–15 ft (3.0–4.6 m). The cities of Fort Myers, Cape Coral, and Naples were particularly hit hard, leaving millions without power in the storm's wake and numerous inhabitants forced to take refuge on their roofs. Sanibel Island, Fort Myers Beach, and Pine Island bore the brunt of Ian's powerful winds and its accompanying storm surge at landfall, which leveled thousands of standing structures in the region and collapsed the Sanibel Causeway and the Pine Island Causeway to Pine Island, entrapping those left on the islands for several days. The destruction led to the United States Congress holding a televised investigative hearing regarding the federal government's response to and overall recovery efforts from Ian. The hearing discovered numerous issues with how the Federal Emergency Management Agency (FEMA) responded to the aftermath of Ian. Following the conclusion of the season, the name Ian was retired from the rotating list of names due to the destruction and loss of life it caused. Its name will be replaced by Idris, starting in the 2028 season.

== Meteorological history ==
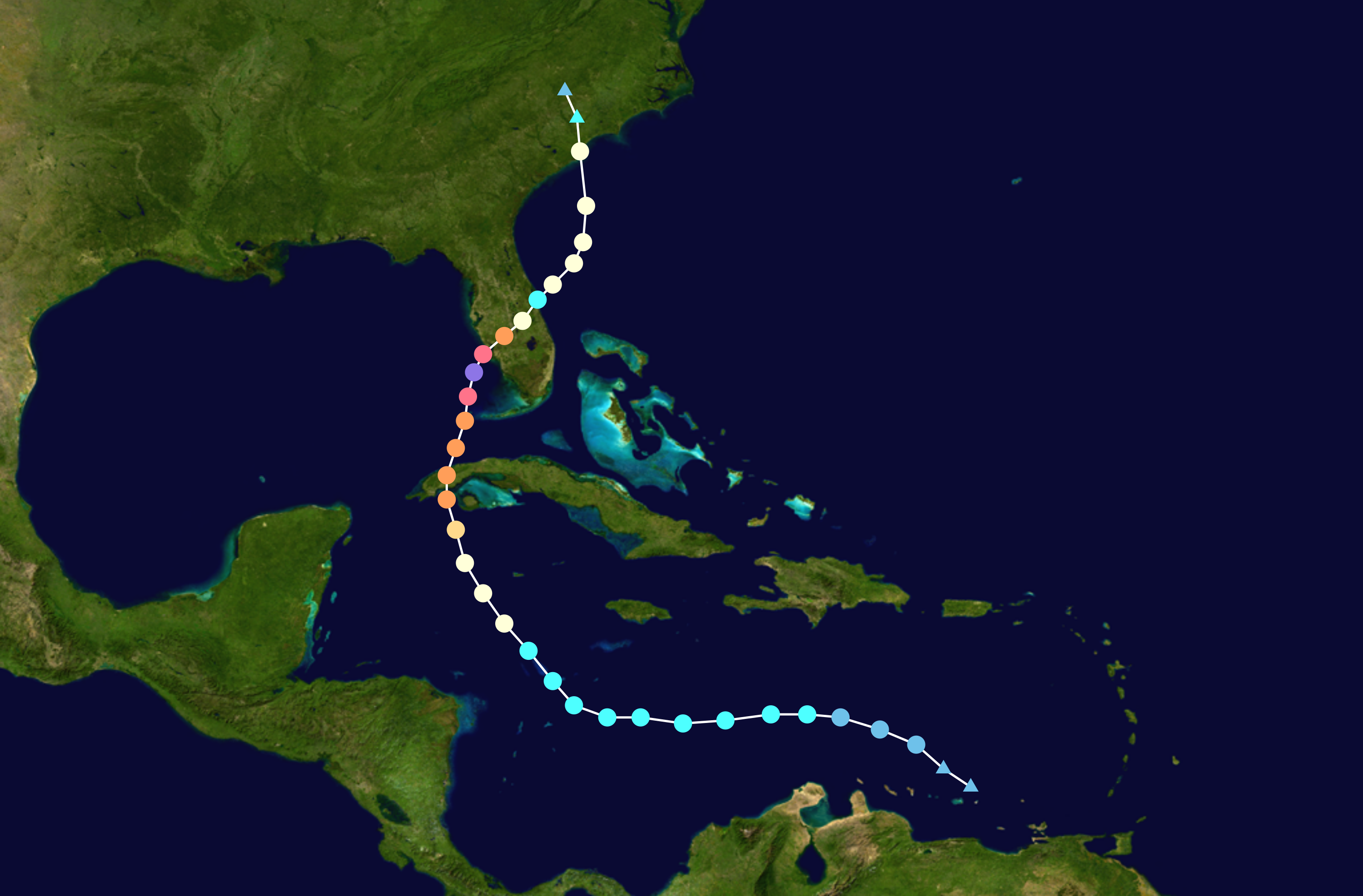
Map plotting the storm's track and intensity, according to the Saffir–Simpson scale Map key Saffir–Simpson scale Tropical depression (≤38 mph, ≤62 km/h) Tropical storm (39–73 mph, 63–118 km/h) Category 1 (74–95 mph, 119–153 km/h) Category 2 (96–110 mph, 154–177 km/h) Category 3 (111–129 mph, 178–208 km/h) Category 4 (130–156 mph, 209–251 km/h) Category 5 (≥157 mph, ≥252 km/h) Unknown Storm type Tropical cyclone Subtropical cyclone Extratropical cyclone, remnant low, tropical disturbance, or monsoon depression

Ian originated from a tropical wave producing a large amount of showers and thunderstorms moving off the west coast of Africa on September 14–15. The wave subsequently moved westward, passing south of the Cape Verde Islands with occasional bursts of convection during the ensuing six days. On September 22, as the disturbance tracked west-northwestward it showed signs of increasing organization. Strong wind shear with 30–35 mph (45–55 km/h) winds generated by the upper-level outflow from Hurricane Fiona inhibited development into a tropical depression. A well-defined circulation was still able to form within the disturbance by 06:00 September 23; its convection then increased and became persistent overnight into the next day. As a result, it was designated Tropical Depression Nine at that time.

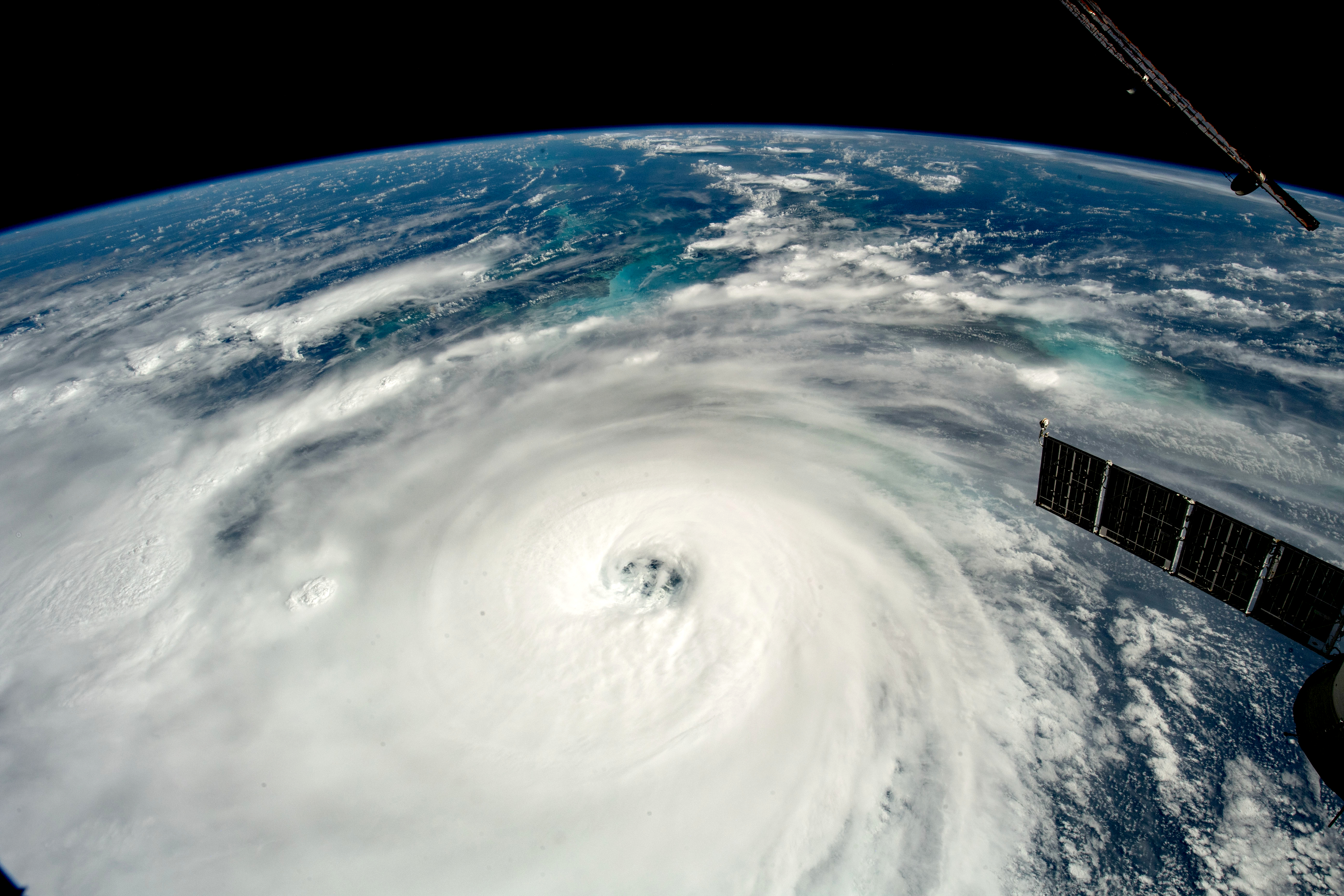
Hurricane Ian viewed by the Expedition 67 crew on board the International Space Station on September 28

By 00:00 UTC on September 24, the depression's wind speed had increased to 40 mph (64 km/h), at which time it became Tropical Storm Ian. Moderate-to-strong vertical wind shear hindered development of Ian until late the following day; it began rapidly intensifying at 18:00 UTC September 25. Ian became a hurricane 12 hours later and a major hurricane after another 24 hours. At approximately 08:30 UTC on September 27, Ian made landfall on western Cuba as a high-end Category 3 hurricane with sustained winds of 125 mph (205 km/h) and a pressure of 947 mbar (27.96 inHg), becoming the strongest tropical cyclone to impact Pinar del Río Province since Hurricane Gustav in 2008. Ian weakened to a low-end major hurricane with 115 mph (185 km/h) winds as it emerged off the coast of Cuba and into the southeastern Gulf of Mexico around 14:00 UTC. Ian strengthened slightly once offshore, then initiated an eyewall replacement cycle causing its wind speed to remain steady at 120 mph (195 km/h) for about 12 hours. Its central pressure continued to fall to a minimum of 947 mbar (27.96 inHg) before temporarily rising to 952 mbar (28.11 inHg) by 02:00 UTC, when it moved over the Dry Tortugas with winds of 125 mph (205 km/h). Ian completed the eyewall replacement cycle shortly afterwards and began rapidly intensifying once more. By 12:00 UTC on September 28, Ian strengthened further to its peak intensity as a Category 5 hurricane with sustained winds of 160 mph (260 km/h) and an estimated central pressure of 937 mbar (27.67 inHg) as it neared Southwest Florida, despite outflow being restricted in its southwestern quadrant by moderate wind shear. Operationally, the NHC classified Ian as a high-end Category 4 hurricane with winds of 155 mph (250 km/h), but during post-season reanalysis concluded a peak wind speed of 160 mph (260 km/h) based on stepped frequency microwave radiometer measurements of 158–159 mph (254–256 km/h) (these observations had been flagged as being unreliable operationally). At around this time, a NOAA weather drone measured wind gusts reaching up to 216 mph (348 km/h). Ian maintained its intensity for several hours before weakening to a Category 4 hurricane as it approached the coast of Florida due to worsening environmental conditions. At 19:05 UTC, Ian made landfall on Cayo Costa with sustained winds of 150 mph (240 km/h) and an estimated central pressure of 941 mbar (27.79 inHg), becoming the first Category 4 hurricane to impact Southwest Florida since Charley in 2004, which made landfall at the same location. Ian then made a second landfall just south of Punta Gorda near Pirate Harbor at 20:35 UTC with 145 mph (230 km/h) winds.

Ian weakened to Category 3 strength by 00:00 UTC the next day. Continual land interaction resulted in the frictional displacement of the system, and that coupled with high vertical wind shear caused Ian to quickly degrade to a tropical storm by 12:00 UTC as it moved north-northeast off of the eastern Florida coastline. At 00:00 UTC, the system's low-level circulation had completely emerged off of the coast of Florida, and although the convection was slightly offset to the north, Ian reintensified to a Category 1 hurricane at that time. The system turned northward on the morning of September 30 and accelerated toward the South Carolina coast. It strengthened some during this time, as deep convection re-developed near the center and hybrid frontal features moved away. The system made its final landfall that afternoon near Georgetown, South Carolina, at 18:05 UTC, with sustained winds of 80 mph (130 km/h). Ian became extratropical a few hours later over northeastern South Carolina, and fully dissipated over central North Carolina by 12:00 UTC on October 1.

== Preparations ==
=== Caribbean ===
==== Jamaica ====
The Meteorological Service of Jamaica issued tropical storm watches for the island of Jamaica on September 23. Flood warnings and marine warnings were issued simultaneously.

==== Cayman Islands ====
The government of the Cayman Islands issued hurricane watches for its three islands, Grand Cayman, Cayman Brac, and Little Cayman, on September 23 at 21:00 UTC as Ian was projected to pass over the British Overseas Territory as a hurricane. The National Emergency Operations Centre had gone into full activation mode. Along with the emergency services, the Cayman Islands Regiment and Cayman Islands Coast Guard saw the full mobilization and deployment of their personnel. In addition, the Governor of the Cayman Islands, Martyn Roper, requested for the United Kingdom to further deploy additional military assets to the islands for Humanitarian Aid and Disaster Relief Operations. Subsequently, HMS Medway was deployed to the Cayman Islands. Helicopters from Royal Cayman Islands Police Service were also deployed to assist in the operation. At the time one of the helicopters was deployed to the Turks and Caicos Islands before the development of Ian to assist recovery efforts there after the passage of Hurricane Fiona. The Royal Navy also deployed its helicopter to assist. Schools, universities, and education centers closed on the evening of September 23. On September 24 at 18:00 UTC, the hurricane watch for Grand Cayman was upgraded to a hurricane warning, and the hurricane watch for Cayman Brac and Little Cayman was changed to a tropical storm watch. Flood warnings along with marine warnings were also issued for Grand Cayman. The Cayman Islands Airports Authority continued operating the airports until the afternoon of September 25. Then the airports closed and the aircraft at the airports were evacuated.

==== Cuba ====
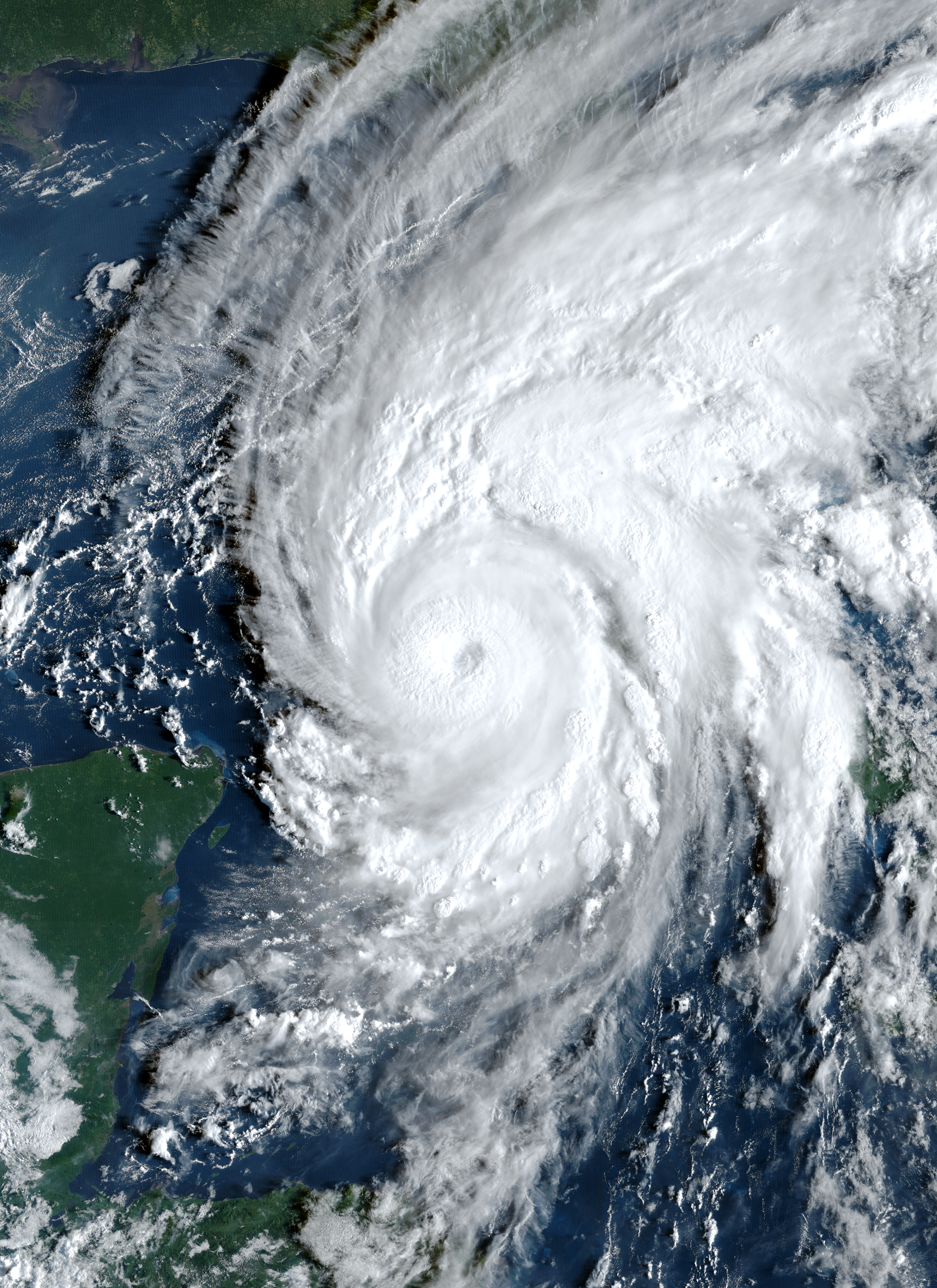
Hurricane Ian shortly after its landfall over western Cuba early on September 27

Authorities in Cuba issued evacuation orders for around 50,000 people in the Pinar del Rio province and set up around 55 shelters before the storm. State media stated that steps were being taken to protect food and crops in warehouses. Locals removed fishing boats in Havana, and city workers inspected and unclogged storm drains.

=== United States ===
Amtrak suspended its Auto Train service for September 27–28 and truncated the September 26 southbound Silver Star service, which was already on a modified schedule due to the suspension of the Silver Meteor service, at Jacksonville, Florida, on September 27. Silver Star service was canceled for September 27–28 with the northbound Silver Star for September 29 also canceled. Ian's updated track forecast then prompted them to suspend those services through October 1. Palmetto service was also truncated for Washington D.C., on September 30 and October 1. As Ian dissipated over the Carolinas, Amtrak modified its schedule, truncating the October 2 southbound Silver Star at Jacksonville, which would be the origin of the October 3 northbound Silver Star. Bus transportation was provided for Orlando and Tampa. Additionally, the resumption of the Silver Meteor service, which had been suspended since January 24, 2022, due to a resurgence of the Omicron variant of COVID-19, was pushed back from October 3 to 11. The modified schedule and the resumption of service for the Silver Meteor was then pushed out to October 13 due to the extensive damage inflicted along the Central Florida Rail Corridor. Full resumptions of both of these services would occur over a period from October 14–17.

Satellite image showing Hurricane Ian making landfall in southwestern Florida on September 28

The ninth public hearing of the United States House Select Committee on the January 6 Attack, scheduled for September 28 was postponed. The governors of North Carolina, South Carolina, and Virginia declared a state of emergency in preparation for the incoming storm. Over 3,500 flights were canceled as a direct result of Ian. Amazon canceled warehouse operations in some facilities.

==== Florida ====
On September 24, Governor Ron DeSantis declared a state of emergency for all of Florida. Tampa Bay area schools also announced closures, and several colleges and universities, including the University of South Florida, the University of Tampa, and Eckerd College announced that they were canceling classes and closing. By September 27, 55 public school districts across the state announced cancellations, many through the end of the week. Officials at the Kennedy Space Center delayed the launch of NASA's Artemis 1, and the rocket was returned to the Vehicle Assembly Building. President Joe Biden approved a state of emergency declaration for Florida on September 24. Many airports and ports in Tampa, Tampa Bay, Orlando, St. Petersburg, Key West, and other places announced that they would be suspending operations. Walt Disney World and Universal Orlando said that they would be closing attractions. A number of stores and restaurants like Walmart and Waffle House were closed because of the impending dangerous weather.

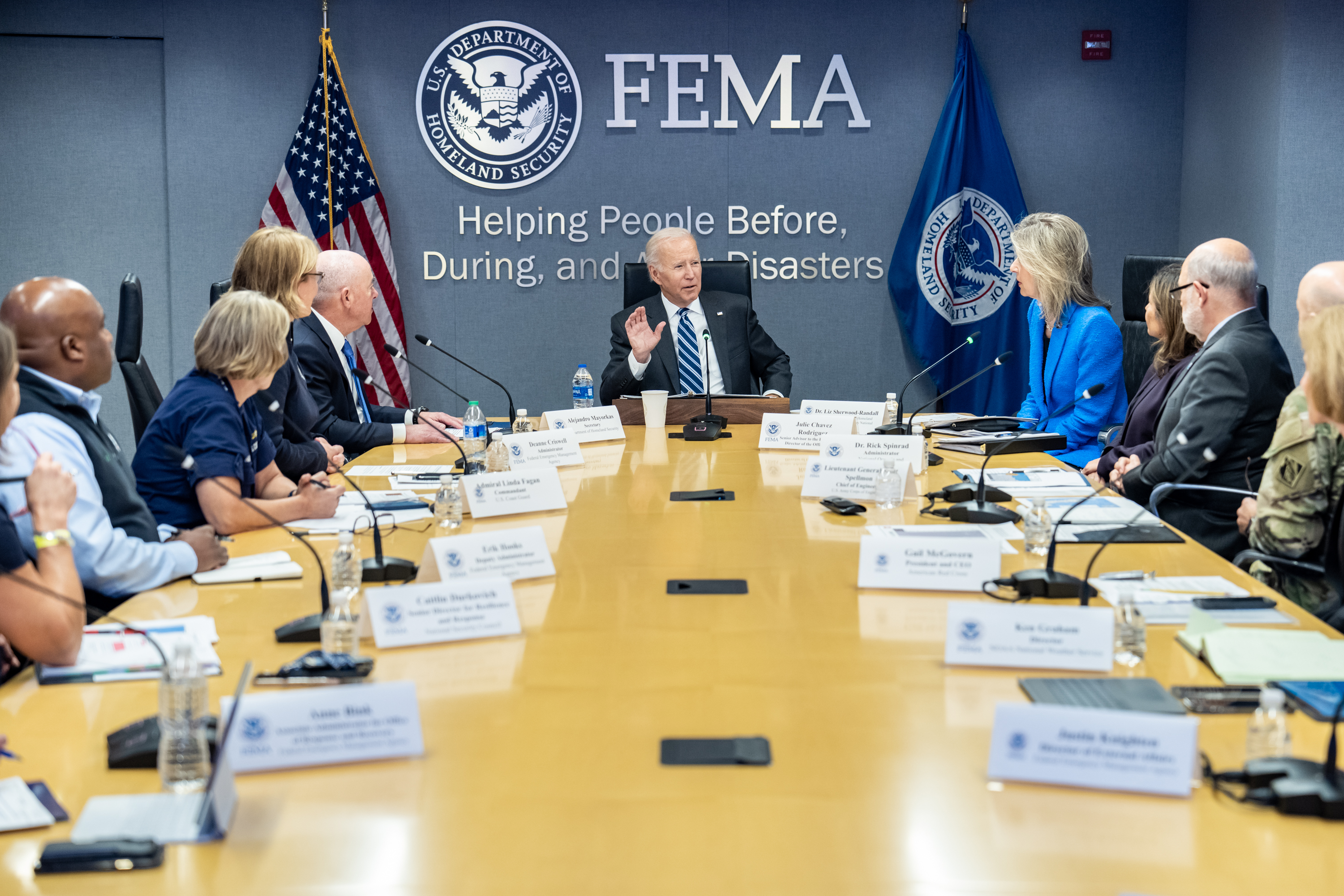
President Biden meeting with FEMA officials in advance of the hurricane on September 29

Mandatory evacuation orders were issued for parts of multiple counties. Around 300,000 people were evacuated in Hillsborough County (which centers on Tampa) with schools and other locations being used as shelters. Before the impact school closures and mandatory evacuations were made across much of the Florida peninsula. DeSantis mobilized 5,000 Florida state national guard troops. Another 2,000 were deployed on standby in neighboring states. Officials in Tallahassee and nearby cities commissioned the monitoring of local power lines and scouring of storm-water systems to make them prepared and secure.

The college football game between the East Carolina Pirates and the South Florida Bulls was moved from South Florida's stadium in Tampa to Boca Raton. The Tampa Bay Buccaneers of the National Football League moved practices from Tampa south to the Miami Dolphins training facility in Miami Gardens.

All three national parks in Florida (Biscayne National Park, Dry Tortugas National Park, and Everglades National Park) closed in preparation for the hurricane. The Florida section of Gulf Islands National Seashore was also closed.

==== Georgia ====
Governor Brian Kemp ordered the activation of the State Operations Center on September 26 which began preparations for the impact of the storm in the later part of the week. Many farmers prepared before the storm by turning off irrigation systems attempting to dry out the ground while harvesting what they could (much of the state's cotton crop had not been harvested yet). Atlanta Motor Speedway opened their campgrounds to hurricane evacuees. The construction project to improve I-16 in Chatham County was put on hold until the storm passed as well.

==== South Carolina ====
Governor Henry McMaster declared a state of emergency and activated the emergency operations plan for the state. The college football game between the South Carolina State Bulldogs and South Carolina Gamecocks scheduled for October 1 at 12:00 p.m. was moved up to September 29 at 7:00 p.m. on account of the storm. On September 29, the National Park Service announced that Congaree National Park will be closed until at least October 2. The National Forest Service, meanwhile, closed both Francis Marion National Forest and Sumter National Forest.

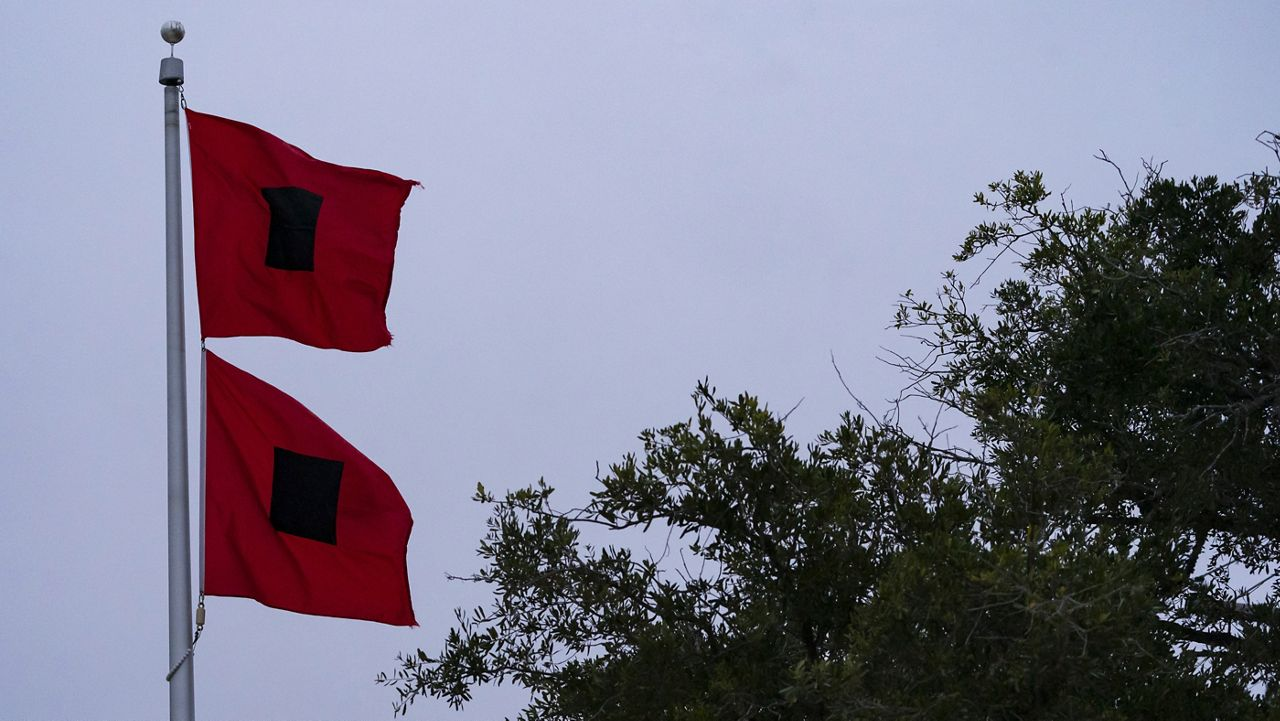
Hurricane Warning flags seen in Sullivan's Island, South Carolina as Ian approaches on September 29.

On September 30, the Weather Prediction Center issued a moderate risk of excessive rainfall for a large portion of South Carolina and North Carolina. In the afternoon of September 30, Hurricane Ian made landfall just south of Georgetown, South Carolina causing moderate flooding in the streets.

==== Elsewhere ====
Talladega Superspeedway in Alabama and Charlotte Motor Speedway in North Carolina opened their campgrounds to hurricane evacuees. In Washington, D.C., a Major League Baseball game between the Philadelphia Phillies and Washington Nationals was rescheduled. Another Major League Baseball game in Baltimore between the Baltimore Orioles and Toronto Blue Jays was also rescheduled. A third Major League Baseball game in New York City between the New York Mets and Washington Nationals was rescheduled as well.

=== The Bahamas ===
The eastward shift in Ian's track as well as the increasing size of the hurricane prompted the issuance of a tropical storm warning for Bimini and Grand Bahama in the Bahamas late on September 27.

== Impact ==
Fatalities and monetary damage
Country	Region	Deaths	Damage (USD)
Jamaica	—N/a	0	$5.86 million
Cuba	Pinar del Río	5	$200 million (Per Karen Clark & Company)
United States	Florida	150*	$111.8 billion (Per NOAA)
United States	South Carolina	0	$111.8 billion (Per NOAA)
United States	North Carolina	5	$111.8 billion (Per NOAA)
United States	Virginia	1	$111.8 billion (Per NOAA)
Total:		161	$112 billion
* Includes 7 Cuban migrant deaths offshore counted by Florida

=== Caribbean ===
==== Southern Caribbean and South America ====
The disturbance brought gusty winds and heavy rain to Trinidad and Tobago, the ABC islands, and to the northern coasts of Venezuela and Colombia, causing flooding and minor damage.

==== Jamaica ====
Ian brought light to moderate rainfall in the southern part of the island, resulted in minor flooding. Prime Minister Andrew Holness said that the total damage of Ian stood at J$889 million (US$5.86 million).

==== Cayman Islands ====
Minimal impacts were felt on the Cayman Islands as the storm passed to its west. The all-clear for the Islands was called at 3:00 pm. EDT on September 26 from the National Emergency Operations Center. Several inches of rain and wind gusts of up to 50 mph (80 km/h) were observed at Seven Mile Beach on Grand Cayman, along with minor storm surge flooding. Minor damage and scattered power outages were also reported.

==== Cuba ====
Striking western Cuba as a Category 3 hurricane, Ian caused extensive damage throughout Pinar del Río and Mayabeque provinces. The storm made landfall at 4:30 local time on September 27, in Pinar del Río. A peak wind gust of 129 mph (208 km/h) was observed in San Juan y Martínez. A 24-hour rainfall total of 4.3 in (108.3 mm) was measured on Isla de la Juventud. Significant storm surge inundation occurred along the coasts of the Gulf of Guanahacabibes and Isla de la Juventud. Ian caused a power outage in Pinar del Río, cutting power to the entire province, which had a population of 850,000. The Cuba Institute of Meteorology located in Havana reported a sustained wind of 56 mph (90 km/h) with a gust to 87 mph (140 km/h) during the afternoon of September 27. Five people were killed in Cuba: a man in San Juan y Martínez who was electrocuted while disconnecting a wind turbine used for irrigating his field, a 43-year-old woman who died when one of the walls of her house collapsed, two state technicians who were working on repairing breakdowns caused by Ian, and a fifth person of unknown cause.

In the early morning of September 28, the storm knocked out power to the entirety of Cuba after a collapse of its power grid; it left 11 million people without power.

=== United States ===
In the United States, over 9 million people lost power.

==== Florida ====
Radar loop showing Hurricane Ian making landfall in the Southwest Florida region

On September 29, Lee County Sheriff Carmine Marceno, whose jurisdiction covers Cape Coral and Fort Myers, estimated that thousands of people may still be trapped in floodwaters. President Biden said the storm could end up as the deadliest in Florida's history. In an interview on September 29, Marceno said that hundreds of deaths may have occurred, but he and Governor DeSantis later downplayed the remark.

According to the Florida Medical Examiners Commission, as of February 3, 2023, 149 people were confirmed to have died across Florida as a direct result of Hurricane Ian. 72 of those deaths occurred in Lee County, and 9 occurred in neighboring Charlotte County. In the Florida Keys, seven Cuban migrants drowned when their boat capsized off Stock Island, in Monroe County, as Ian moved through; 11 others were missing. In addition, ten people died in Sarasota and Collier Counties; seven in Monroe and Volusia Counties; five in Hillsborough, Manatee, and Osceola Counties; four in Hardee County; three in Orange and Putnam Counties; two each in Hendry and Polk Counties; and one each in DeSoto, Lake, and Martin, Miami-Dade and St. Lucie Counties. Ian also caused two indirect deaths in Sarasota County, a 94-year-old man, and an 80-year-old woman, both due to disabled oxygen machines that they were using. Another from Lee County reportedly died by suicide after seeing the extent of damage done to his property after the storm.

Overall, more than 2.4 million people in Florida lost power during the storm and in its aftermath. Rainfall in Ponce Inlet was recorded at 31.52 inches (801 mm). Total damage in Florida was estimated at $109.5 billion.

==== The Carolinas ====
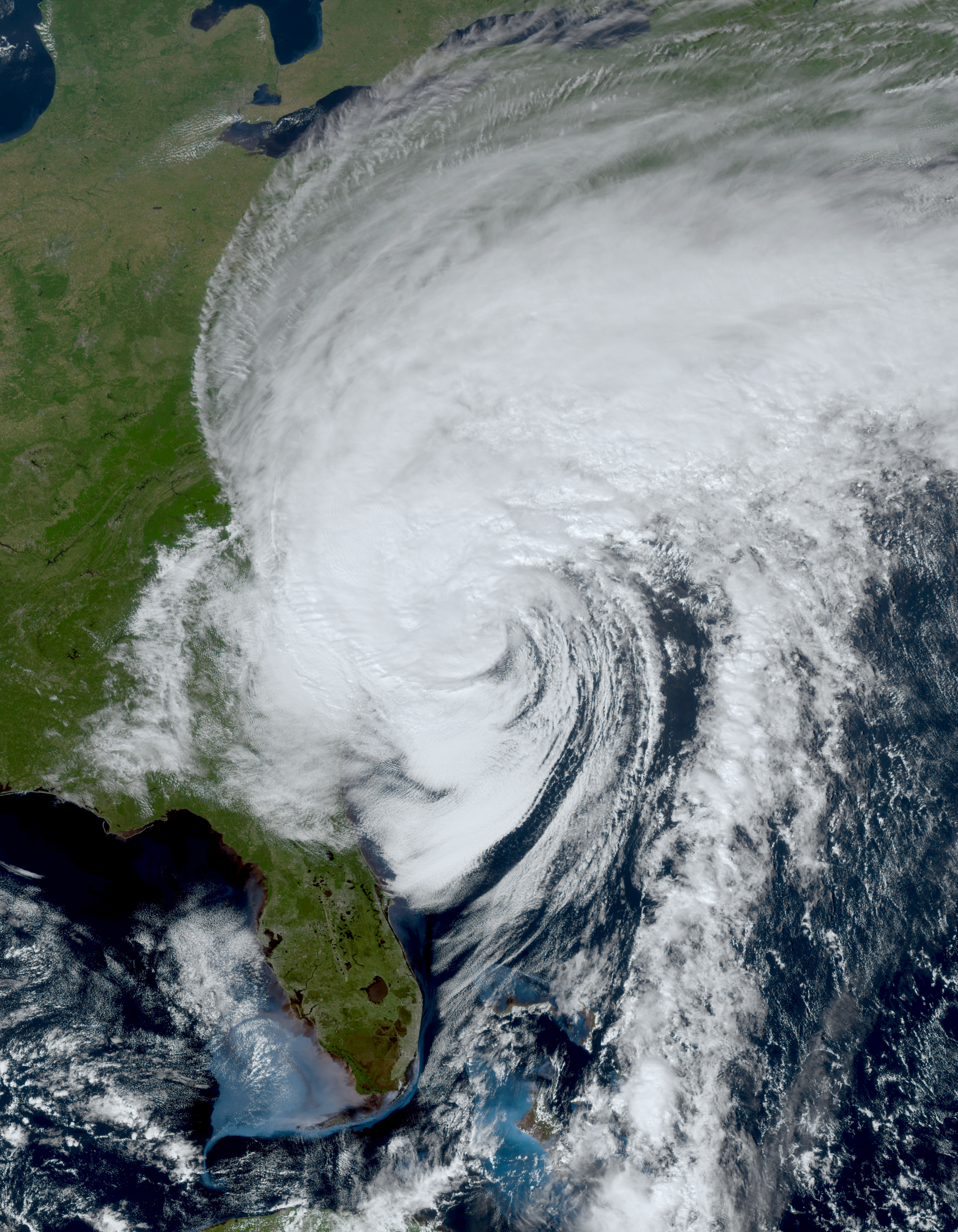
Hurricane Ian making landfall near Georgetown, South Carolina on September 30

In South Carolina, over 210,000 customers had lost power from the hurricane by 3:00 pm EDT on September 30. A tidal gauge at Springmaid Pier in Myrtle Beach reached 10.77 feet (3.28 m), beating the record of 9.8 feet (3.0 m) set by Hurricane Isaias which struck two years prior. Rainfall totals reached 8.14 in (207 mm) in Charleston. As of 11:00 am EDT on October 1, an estimated 63,000 customers remained without power, primarily in Horry, Georgetown, Charleston, Florence, Williamsburg, and Berkeley Counties.

In North Carolina, over 76,000 customers had lost power by 3:30 pm EDT on September 30, with 65,000 in Wake County alone. An EF0 tornado also touched down in Holden Beach, damaging multiple homes in the town, while an EFU tornado touched down northeast of Aurora. There were five storm-related deaths in the state: three in Johnston County, one in Martin County, and one in Moore County.

==== Elsewhere ====
Strong winds and rain moved through the Mid-Atlantic region. 95,000 people lost power in Virginia. Wind gusts reached as high as 69 mph (111 km/h) in Cape Henry and 68 mph (109 km/h) in the Chesapeake Bay Bridge Tunnel. In Delaware, gusts reached 48 mph (77 km/h) in Dewey Beach. On October 3, flooding resulted in Delaware Route 1 shutting down between Bethany Beach and Dewey Beach. The storm surge in Lewes, Delaware reached 3.48 ft (1.06 m), the seventh highest level on record.

A separate low-pressure area formed to the northeast of Ian as it dissipated on October 1, which stalled off the coast of New Jersey for nearly a week. Widespread coastal flooding occurred along the Jersey Shore, with Sea Isle City receiving 8.14 inches (207 mm) of rain between October 1 and 3. In addition, Philadelphia set a daily precipitation record due to the storm on October 2, at 1.99 in (51 mm). AccuWeather described the system as a nor'easter which produced storm surge levels comparable to those of Hurricane Sandy. The rainfall alleviated drought conditions throughout much of New Jersey, and lasted until October 5. The system also produced unseasonably cold temperatures across the region, with Trenton having a maximum temperature of 53 °F (12 °C) on October 4, one degree shy of the record lowest daily high for that date. Several ferries between Cape May, New Jersey and Lewes, Delaware were canceled due to the storm on October 3. Due to the storm drenching New Jersey, the state realized their tenth wettest October on record. In New York, Seastreak ferry service suspended all service on October 2 until the next day due to high winds; however, Staten Island Ferry and NYC Ferry continued operations. The system brought the coldest daily high for October 3 on record to John F. Kennedy International Airport, with a high of 52 °F (11 °C). Minor coastal flooding occurred in New York City as well. Nearly 1,500 customers across Connecticut, including 11% of Weston's customers, lost power.

== Aftermath ==
Costliest U.S. Atlantic hurricanes (Note: The storm category color indicates the intensity of the hurricane when landfalling in the U.S.)
Rank	Hurricane	Season	Damage
1	3 Katrina	2005	$125 billion
1	4 Harvey	2017	$125 billion
3	4 Ian	2022	$112 billion
4	4 Maria	2017	$90 billion
5	4 Helene	2024	$78.7 billion
6	4 Ida	2021	$75 billion
7	ET Sandy	2012	$65 billion
8	4 Irma	2017	$52.1 billion
9	3 Milton	2024	$34.3 billion
10	2 Ike	2008	$30 billion

=== Cuba ===
Mass power outages and a nationwide blackout led to protests in Cuba, with at least 400 demonstrators demanding the central government restore power and Internet access. A rare request of emergency assistance from the U.S. was approved by Biden on September 30 after Ian passed. The European Union announced a package of €1 million in aid while the Ministry of Foreign Affairs and Worship of Argentina sent pills for the potabilization of nearly one million liters of water via the White Helmets Commission. The government of Japan also dispatched help to Cuba through its Japan International Cooperation Agency.

=== United States ===
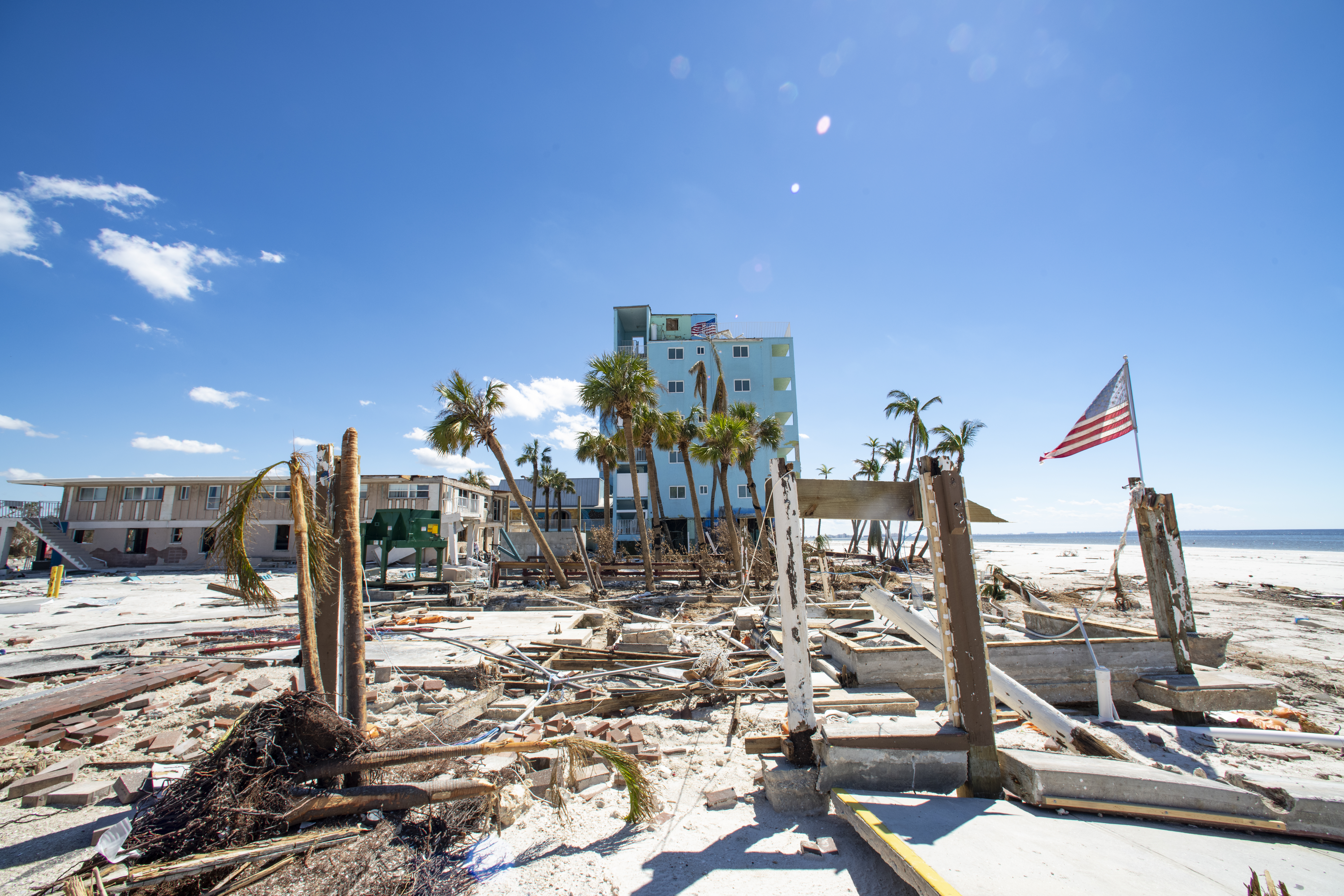
An American flag stands in Fort Myers Beach, Florida in the aftermath of Ian

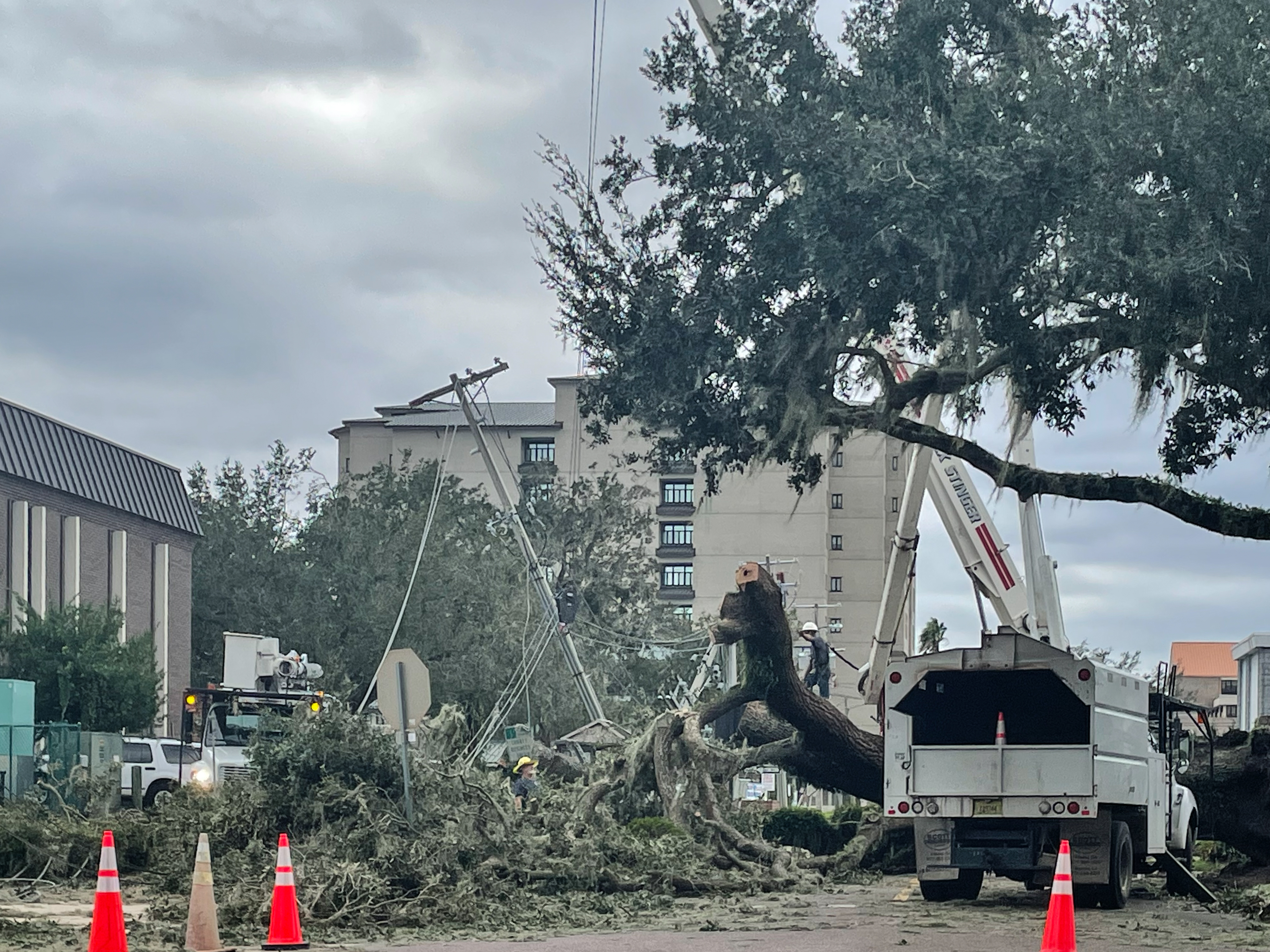
Downed trees and cleanup efforts in Bartow, Florida

Soon after the conditions improved in impacted parts of Florida, search and rescue teams, first responders, and utility workers from un-impacted parts of Florida and across the country deployed to the area. The American Red Cross mobilized and began to provide shelter and supplies to those who needed it as well. Various other international, federal and local organizations also mobilized to help spread donations throughout affected populations in the form of both monetary and physical donations. On October 3, The Guardian reported 10,000 people remained unaccounted for. However, the next day, FEMA's statement did not include numbers about people remaining unaccounted for.

There were sporadic reports of looting and burglaries at several businesses in Lee County, Florida; alleged thefts of non-essential items such as sports apparel and athletic shoes during the height of the storm prompted officials to enforce a curfew in the county. Door-to-door scams posing as charities were carried out across the nation. According to DeSantis, Florida was working with SpaceX CEO Elon Musk to use the Starlink satellite Internet service to help restore communication across the state.

At least eight school districts suffered closures as a result of Ian. The Lee County and DeSoto County Public School Districts reopened on October 17. The Charlotte County Public School District reopened October 18. Sarasota County Schools were closed due to damage from storm, with classes resuming on October 10 for most of the county, while several schools that sustained more damage remaining closed until October 17.

Critics have noted that federally subsidized flood insurance is one of the reasons that people continue to move to hurricane-prone areas of Florida. Since the National Flood Insurance Program (NFIP) began, millions of people moved to Florida in the past 50 years into areas that were part of Hurricane Ian's path in part, critics note, due to the subsidized flood insurance offered by the federal government and insurance companies. NBC News described most of the deaths as preventable, blaming a lack of communication on the government's side and care on the citizen's side.

Many insurance companies went out of business and 200,000 claims could not be paid.

Lee County also saw a sharp rise in infections and death from flesh-eating bacteria that live in warm brackish water. By October 18, 2022, 29 cases and four deaths had been recorded since landfall due to infection from Vibrio vulnificus, at least one of whom was from out of state. At least one Lee County man was infected with Mycobacterium haemophilum.

Around 15% of the bees in the United States, which were found in Florida, were affected by Ian. Upwards of 150,000 bee hives were destroyed in the storm. Surviving bees were malnourished due to Brazilian peppertrees, which bloom in the autumn, being stripped.

Weeks later several coast side condominiums and hotels damaged by Ian in Volusia County were deemed unsafe and evacuated as Hurricane Nicole approached on November 10. Many structures fell into the ocean.

On February 10, 2024, a fire station in Sanibel was demolished after suffering wind and flood damage. The station moved temporarily into a mobile home that month.

==== Damage estimates ====
Early estimates of Ian's cost ranged $42 billion to $258 billion, with Ian being by far the most costly climate-related event of 2022. Shown: Christian Aid estimates of ten most costly of such 2022 disasters.

Preliminary estimates of damages from Hurricane Ian are wide-ranging. Various analytic agencies and insurance companies have placed losses in the tens of billions. CoreLogic reported potential insured losses at $28–47 billion. Verisk Analytics indicated a total of $42–57 billion and potentially over $60 billion when losses not covered under the NFIP are included. Moody's Analytics calculated potential damages of $45–55 billion in Florida alone with billions more in South Carolina. Total economic losses were estimated at $56 billion by Enki Research. Karen Clark & Co. placed insured damages at nearly $63 billion with total economic losses over $100 billion. On October 10, Risk Management Solutions, a subsidiary of Moody's Corporation, placed private market damages at $53–74 billion with an additional $10 billion from the NFIP. Beyond physical and economic losses, The Triple-I Corporation estimated litigation costs in Florida would reach $10–20 billion.

On January 10, 2023, the National Oceanic and Atmospheric Administration estimated total losses at $112 billion, making Ian the costliest hurricane in Florida's history, surpassing Hurricane Irma of 2017, as well as the third-costliest in US history, behind only Hurricane Katrina of 2005 and Hurricane Harvey of 2017 respectively. Ian marked the 15th billion-dollar disaster for the country in 2022.

In 2023, Florida senator Rick Scott introduced the Hurricane Tax Relief Act into the 118th Congress, which would enable Ian's victims, as well as victims of Hurricanes Nicole and Fiona in the US and Puerto Rico to more easily claim damage relief on their 2022 tax bills.

==== Congressional investigation ====
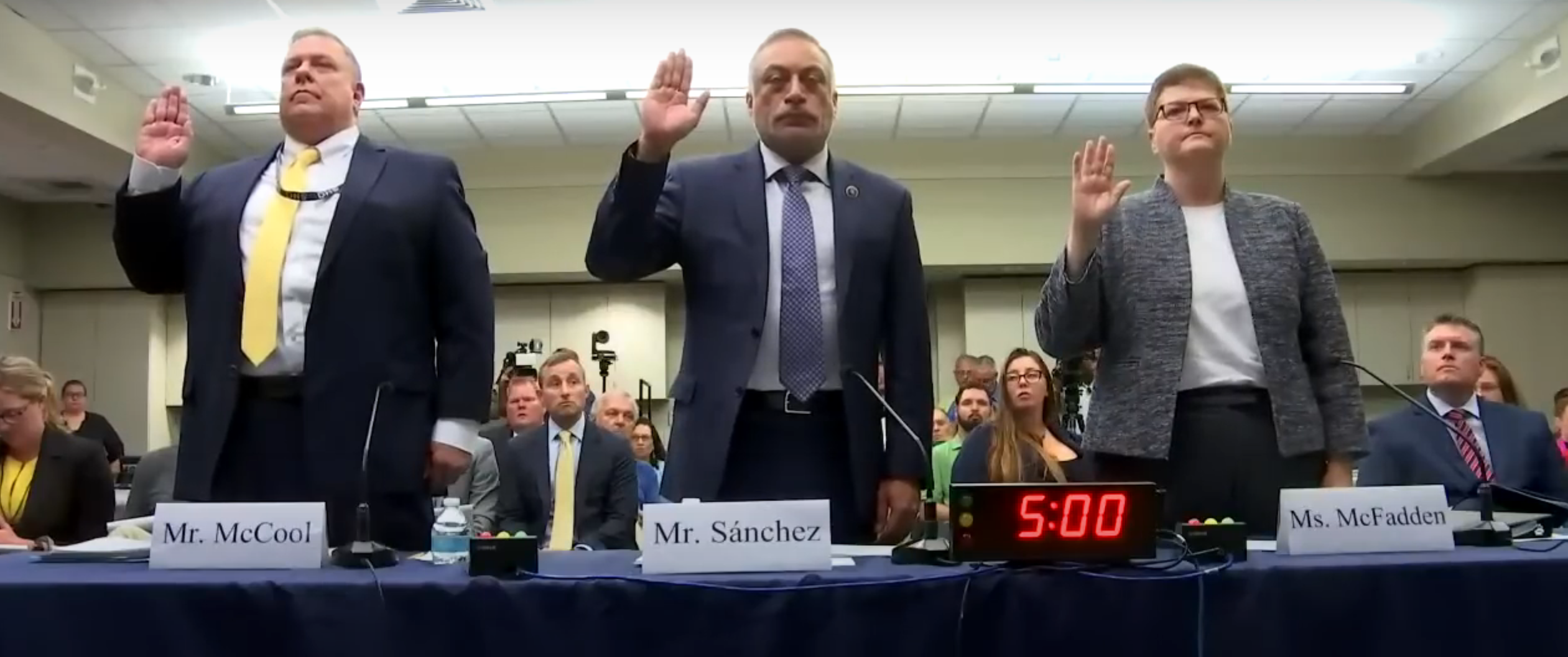
FEMA, SBA, and HUD officials giving an oath to testify truthfully during the hearing

In August 2023, the House Committee on Oversight and Government Reform launched an investigation into the government's response to and overall recovery efforts from Hurricane Ian. During the investigation, witnesses from Federal Emergency Management Agency (FEMA), the Small Business Administration (SBA), the Department of Housing and Urban Development (HUD), along with others were called to provide testimony.

== Depiction in media ==
The storm had heavy coverage in both traditional media and social media. Coverage of Hurricane Ian was the most viewed by cable viewership on September 28 with the Weather Channel occupying eight of the top ten cable spots with continuous coverage of the storm. Fox Weather, the weather streaming service from Fox News reported an average of 552,000 viewers on September 28 between 1:00–4:00 pm ET when the storm made landfall in Florida. This was by far their most ever daily views. Internet personality Ryan Hall, Y'all was ranked number three on YouTube during a livestream covering Ian's landfall on September 29.

Photos and videos of the hurricane were posted throughout social media with a large amount seen on TikTok where videos posted under the hashtag #HurricaneIan had about 3.5 billion views by September 28, while on Instagram there were more than 65,000 posts with the same hashtag. Others provided livestream feeds of their homes and surrounding areas during the hurricane. Many Floridians who posted about the storm to social media found humor while discussing preparing for the hurricane, the storm, and its aftermath. Some people who sheltered in place at Walt Disney World documented or livestreamed their experiences and the storm, and in some cases monetized the videos which drew criticism from many. In one case a Floridian YouTuber's video was disliked more than double the number of times it was liked on the platform.

Many asked for help on social media looking for loved ones after losing contact with them or getting pleas from them for aid. While Florida authorities urged Floridians to use official emergency channels to report emergencies and to limit personal information that could be shared, many discovered informal digital structures or relied on ones from previous disasters to help provide aid or finding missing individuals.

== Retirement ==
Due to the extreme damage and number of deaths the hurricane caused, particularly in Florida, the World Meteorological Organization retired the name Ian from its rotating name lists in March 2023, and it will never be used again for another Atlantic tropical cyclone. It was replaced with Idris, which will first appear on the 2028 season list.

== See also ==
- Weather of 2022
- Tropical cyclones in 2022
- List of Category 5 Atlantic hurricanes
- List of Florida hurricanes (2000–present)
- List of South Carolina hurricanes
- List of costliest Atlantic hurricanes
