= Abdullah Shelbayh =

Jordanian tennis player (born 2003)

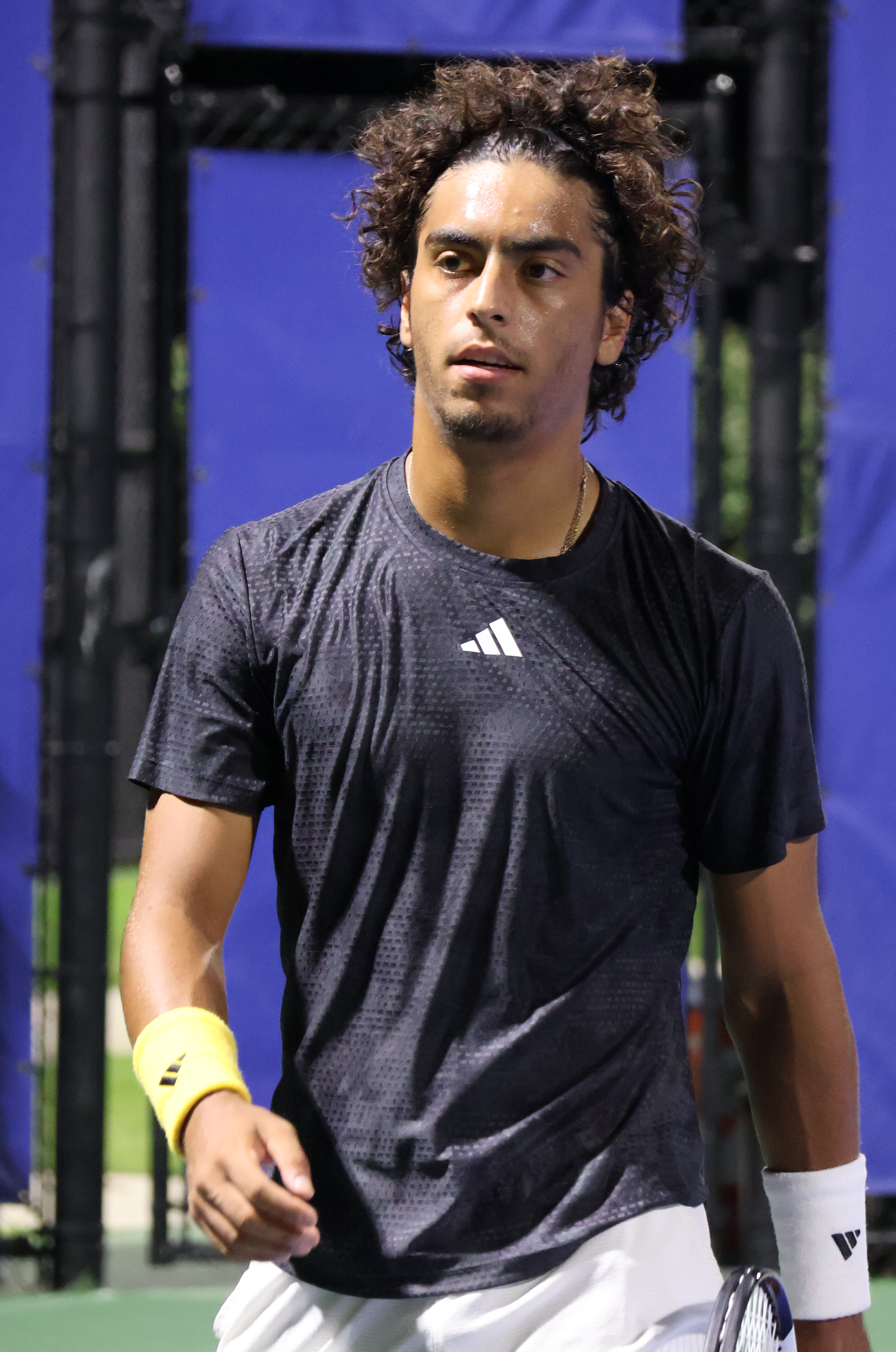
- Shelbayh at the 2023 Cary Challenger
- ITF name: Abedallah Shelbayh
- Country (sports): Jordan
- Born: 16 November 2003 (age 23) Amman, Jordan
- Height: 1.80 m (5 ft 11 in)
- Plays: Left-handed (two-handed backhand)
- College: University of Florida
- Coach: Fernando Verdasco, Diego Dinomo
- Prize money: US $787,694

Singles
- Career record: 4–14 (at ATP Tour level, Grand Slam level, and in Davis Cup)
- Career titles: 0
- Highest ranking: No. 181 (29 January 2024)
- Current ranking: No. 255 (16 November 2026)

Grand Slam singles results
- Australian Open: Q3 (2024)
- US Open: Q2 (2024)

Doubles
- Career record: 1–3 (at ATP Tour level, Grand Slam level, and in Davis Cup)
- Career titles: 0
- Highest ranking: No. 177 (2 December 2024)
- Current ranking: No. 569 (16 November 2026)

Team competitions
- Davis Cup: 10–1
- Last updated on: 16 November 2026.

Abedallah Shelbayh (Arabic: عبد الله شلبايه, romanized: eabd allah shalabih; also known as Abdullah Shelbayh (Arabic: عبدالله شلبايه, romanized: eabdallah shalabih); born 16 November 2003) is a Jordanian tennis player. Shelbayh has a career-high ATP singles ranking of world No. 181 achieved on 29 January 2024 and is the first Jordanian tennis player to achieve an ATP world ranking and a career-high ATP doubles ranking of world No. 177 achieved on 2 December 2024.

He had a career-high ITF juniors ranking of 27 achieved on 12 July 2021. Shelbayh has won three ITF singles titles and one doubles title on the ITF Men's Circuit and one on the ATP Challenger Tour.

Shelbayh represents Jordan at the Davis Cup, where he has a win-loss record of 10–1.

== Early life ==
Shelbayh was introduced to tennis by his father, who was a recreational player. He was training in Jordan until he was 14 years old, switching his tennis play to being left-handed in order to emulate his idol, Rafael Nadal. In 2018, Shelbayh moved to Mallorca to join the Rafa Nadal Academy. Princess Lara Faisal asked Toni Nadal to come to Jordan and see if Shelbayh had what it took to join the academy. Toni Nadal was impressed by his talent, prompting Faisal to establish the Rise for Good Sports Fund to help Shelbayh and other young Jordanian prospects in sports.

During his last junior tennis year, Shelbayh enrolled at the University of Florida for a year and played collegiate tennis. In June 2022, he went back to Mallorca to work on turning professional. Shelbayh speaks three languages: Arabic, English and Spanish.

== Career ==
=== 2022: Top 500 ===
In September, Shelbayh reached the semifinals of the Manacor Challenger after receiving a wildcard into the main draw, defeating the top seed and world No. 127 Dominic Stricker in his opening match. Shelbayh became the first player from Jordan to win a match in ATP Challenger Tour history. Following his run to the semifinals, Shelbayh made his debut in the world's top 500.

On December 1, 2022, after one year as part of the Florida Gators men's tennis team at the University of Florida, Shelbayh announced that he would forego his remaining collegiate eligibility in order to turn professional. The following week, Shelbayh won his third ITF singles title in Trnava, Slovakia, defeating Daniel Rincón in the final.

On December 28, 2022, Shelbayh won the second edition of the Arab Masters Tennis Tournament, held in Kuwait City, defeating Benjamin Hassan in the final. In addition to prize money of $25,000, the win gave Shelbayh a wildcard to compete in the main draw of the 2023 Qatar Open in Doha.

=== 2023: Historic maiden Challenger title ===
In February, Shelbayh reached his first ATP Challenger Tour final at the 2023 Bahrain Ministry of Interior Tennis Challenger, defeating the No. 1 seed and world No. 79 Jason Kubler en route. He became the first Jordanian player in history and the youngest Arab to reach a final at Challenger level. Shelbayh was defeated by Thanasi Kokkinakis in the final. As a result of this run, Shelbayh moved up more than 120 positions in ranking, entering the top 300 for the first time at world No. 276 on 20 February 2023.

Shelbayh made his ATP tour-level main draw debut at the 2023 Qatar ExxonMobil Open as a wildcard, the first Jordanian to play in an ATP Tour match, but lost to Kwon Soon-woo in the first round in three sets. In April, Shelbayh won his first doubles title at Challenger level at the 2023 Murcia Open, partnering Daniel Rincón. The pair received entry into the doubles draw as alternates. Later in April, he qualified for the Banja Luka Open in Bosnia and Herzegovina, having received an alternate spot in the qualifying competition. He defeated fellow qualifier Elias Ymer in straight sets in the first round, becoming the first Jordanian player to win an ATP tour-level match.

Shelbayh received a wildcard at the 2023 Mutua Madrid Open, where he made his Masters 1000 debut. He lost to Pedro Cachin in the opening round.

In October, at the LTP Men's Open in Charleston, Shelbayh defeated wildcard Oliver Crawford to become the first Jordanian player to win a Challenger title. In November, he qualified for the 2023 Moselle Open in Metz, France, where he defeated Hugo Gaston in the first round. He lost in the second round to defending champion Lorenzo Sonego. Shelbayh was announced as the wildcard entry into the 2023 Next Gen ATP Finals.

=== 2025: Second Challenger title ===
In September, Shelbayh won the second singles Challenger title of his career at the 2025 Las Vegas Challenger, defeating Alex Rybakov in the final.

=== 2026: First top 50 win, two Challenger finals ===
Entering the 2026 Mallorca Championships as a lucky loser, Shelbayh defeated the number 6 seed, Corentin Moutet, in his opening round match, in doing so recording his first win on the ATP tour since 2023, and his first victory over a top-50 opponent. He lost to wildcard Grigor Dimitrov in the second round.

In September, Shelbayh reached the final of the 2026 Columbus Challenger, where he lost to Dylan Dietrich. In November, he reached the final of the 2026 Knoxville Challenger, defeating top seed and world number 89 Marcos Giron en route. He lost to Clement Chidekh in the final, retiring in the second set.

== Performance timeline ==
=== Singles ===
Current through the 2024 US Open.

Tournament	2022	2023	2024	2025	2026	SR	W–L	Win%
Grand Slam tournaments
Australian Open	A	A	Q3	A	A	0 / 0	0–0	–
French Open	A	A	A	A	A	0 / 0	0–0	–
Wimbledon	A	A	A	A	A	0 / 0	0–0	–
US Open	A	A	Q2	A	A	0 / 0	0–0	–
Win–loss	0–0	0–0	0–0	0–0	0–0	0 / 0	0–0	–
ATP Masters 1000
Indian Wells Masters	A	A	A	A	A	0 / 0	0–0	–
Miami Open	A	Q1	A	A	A	0 / 0	0–0	–
Monte-Carlo Masters	A	A	A	A	A	0 / 0	0–0	–
Madrid Open	A	1R	Q1	A	A	0 / 1	0–1	0%
Italian Open	A	A	A	A	A	0 / 0	0–0	–
Canadian Open	A	A	A	A	A	0 / 0	0–0	–
Cincinnati Masters	A	A	A	A	A	0 / 0	0–0	–
Shanghai Masters	NH	A	A	A	A	0 / 0	0–0	–
Paris Masters	A	A	A	A	A	0 / 0	0–0	–
Win–loss	0–0	0–1	0–0	0–0	0–0	0 / 1	0–1	0%
Career statistics
	2022	2023	2024	2025	2026	Career		
Tournaments	0	8	2			10		
Titles	0	0	0			0		
Finals	0	0	0			0		
Overall win–loss	0–0	3–8	0–2			3–10		
Year-end ranking	470	195	250			23%		

== ATP Challenger and ITF Tour finals ==
=== Singles: 9 (5 titles, 4 runner-ups) ===
Legend (singles) ATP Challenger Tour (2–3) Futures/ITF World Tennis Tour (3–1)	Finals by surface Hard (5–4) Clay (0–0)

Result	W–L	Date	Tournament	Tier	Surface	Opponent	Score
Win	1–0	Jul 2022	M15 Monastir, Tunisia	World Tennis Tour	Hard	(Spain) Daniel Rincón	2–1 ret.
Win	2–0	Jul 2022	M15 Monastir, Tunisia	World Tennis Tour	Hard	(Tunisia) Skander Mansouri	7–6^{(7–3)}, 6–4
Win	3–0	Dec 2022	M15 Trnava, Slovakia	World Tennis Tour	Hard (i)	(Spain) Daniel Rincón	6–1, 6–4
Loss	3–1	Jan 2023	M25 Manacor, Spain	World Tennis Tour	Hard	(Spain) Daniel Rincón	6–7^{(0–7)}, 6–3, 6–7^{(9–11)}
Loss	3–2	Feb 2023	Manama, Bahrain	Challenger	Hard	(Australia) Thanasi Kokkinakis	1–6, 4–6
Win	4–2	Oct 2023	Charleston, USA	Challenger	Hard	(United States) Oliver Crawford	6–2, 6–7^{(5–7)}, 6–3
Win	5–2	Sep 2025	Las Vegas, USA	Challenger	Hard	(United States) Alex Rybakov	6–2, 6–4
Loss	5–3	Sep 2026	Columbus, USA	Challenger	Hard (i)	(Switzerland) Dylan Dietrich	3–6, 2–6
Loss	5–4	Nov 2026	Knoxville, USA	Challenger	Hard (i)	(France) Clément Chidekh	1–6, 0–2 ret.

=== Doubles: 9 (5 titles, 4 runner-ups) ===
Legend (doubles) ATP Challenger Tour (3–2) Futures/ITF World Tennis Tour (2–2)	Finals by surface Hard (2–3) Clay (3–1)

Result	W–L	Date	Tournament	Tier	Surface	Partner	Opponents	Score
Win	1–0	Nov 2020	M15 Valldoreix, Spain	World Tennis Tour	Clay	(Spain) Pedro Vives Marcos	(Denmark) Holger Rune (Ukraine) Eric Vanshelboim	7–5, 6–3
Loss	1–1	Jul 2021	M15 Monastir, Tunisia	World Tennis Tour	Hard	(Spain) Pedro Vives Marcos	(France) Arthur Bouquier (Argentina) Santiago Rodríguez Taverna	7–6^{(7–2)}, 3–6, [6–10]
Win	2–1	Oct 2021	M15 Naples, United States	World Tennis Tour	Clay	(United States) Bruno Kuzuhara	(Denmark) Johannes Ingildsen (Portugal) Duarte Vale	6–4, 6–1
Loss	2–2	Dec 2022	M15 Trnava, Slovakia	World Tennis Tour	Hard (i)	(Hong Kong) Coleman Wong	(Spain) Daniel Rincón (Paraguay) Daniel Vallejo	4–6, 2–6
Win	3–2	Apr 2023	Murcia, Spain	Challenger	Clay	(Spain) Daniel Rincón	(Spain) Sergio Martos Gornés (Italy) Marco Bortolotti	7–6^{(7–3)}, 6–4
Win	4–2	Jan 2024	Canberra, Australia	Challenger	Hard	(Spain) Daniel Rincón	(Sweden) André Göransson (France) Albano Olivetti	7–6^{(7–4)}, 6–3
Loss	4-3	Jun 2024	Tyler, Texas	Challenger	Hard	(Ecuador) Andres Andrade	(Mexico) Hans Hach Verdugo (Japan) James Trotter	6-7^{(3–7)}, 4–6
Loss	4-4	Nov 2024	Torremolinos, Spain	Challenger	Hard	(Spain) Daniel Rincón	(Poland) Karol Drzewiecki (Poland) Piotr Matuszewski	3-6, 4–6
Win	5–4	Feb 2026	Tenerife, Spain	Challenger	Hard	(Spain) David Vega Hernández	(Spain) Pablo Llamas Ruiz (Spain) Benjamín Winter López	6–2, 6–4

== Junior Grand Slam finals ==
=== Doubles: 1 (1 runner-up) ===
Result	Year	Tournament	Surface	Partner	Opponents	Score
Loss	2021	Wimbledon	Grass	(Spain) Daniel Rincón	(Lithuania) Edas Butvilas (Spain) Alejandro Manzanera Pertusa	3–6, 4–6
