= 2011 Antonio Savoldi–Marco Cò – Trofeo Dimmidisì – Doubles =

Marco Cò – Trofeo Dimmidisì – Doubles
- 2011 Antonio Savoldi–Marco Cò – Trofeo Dimmidisì

Final
- Champions: (Germany) Dustin Brown (Croatia) Lovro Zovko
- Runners-up: (Italy) Alessio di Mauro (Italy) Alessandro Motti
- Score: 7–6^{(7–4)}, 7–5

Events
Singles	Doubles
← 2010 ·	Antonio Savoldi–Marco Cò – Trofeo Dimmidisì	· 2015 →

Robin Haase and Thomas Schoorel were the defending champions, but decided not to participate.

Dustin Brown and Lovro Zovko won against Alessio di Mauro and Alessandro Motti 7–6^{(7–4)}, 7–5 in the final and got the title.

== Seeds ==
1. (Germany) Dustin Brown / (Croatia) Lovro Zovko (champions)
2. (Germany) Martin Emmrich / (United Kingdom) Ken Skupski (semifinals)
3. (France) Olivier Charroin / (India) Purav Raja (semifinals)
4. (Australia) Colin Ebelthite / (Australia) Adam Feeney (first round)

== Draw ==
=== Key ===
- Q = Qualifier
- WC = Wild card
- LL = Lucky loser
- Alt = Alternate
- SE = Special exempt
- PR = Protected ranking
- ITF = ITF entry
- JE = Junior exempt
- w/o = Walkover
- r = Retired
- d = Defaulted
- SR = Special ranking

=== Draw ===
First round
1	(Germany) D Brown (Croatia) L Zovko	6	6^{7}	[10]
(Romania) V Crivoi (Germany) D Gremelmayr	3	7^{9}	[5]
(Italy) W Trusendi (Italy) S Vagnozzi	6	6
WC	(Argentina) Kevin Konfederak (Spain) R Ramírez Hidalgo	3	2
3	(France) O Charroin (India) P Raja	6	6
(Italy) M Crugnola (Romania) A Ungur	3	2
(Czech Republic) J Pospíšil (France) F Serra	6	6
(Kazakhstan) E Korolev (Czech Republic) D Škoch	4	2
(Italy) A di Mauro (Italy) A Motti	6	6
(Austria) N Moser (Austria) P Oswald	3	4
WC	(Italy) S Ianni (Italy) M Trevisan	6	7
4	(Australia) C Ebelthite (Australia) A Feeney	4	5
(Spain) P Carreño-Busta (Spain) I Navarro	1	6	[7]
WC	(Argentina) F Delbonis (Argentina) Nicolás Pastor	6	1	[10]
(Germany) S Greul (Netherlands) R Wassen	3	4
2	(Germany) M Emmrich (United Kingdom) K Skupski	6	6

Quarterfinals
1	(Germany) D Brown (Croatia) L Zovko	3	6	[10]
(Italy) W Trusendi (Italy) S Vagnozzi	6	4	[4]
3	(France) O Charroin (India) P Raja	7^{7}	3	[10]
(Czech Republic) J Pospíšil (France) F Serra	6^{4}	6	[8]
(Italy) A di Mauro (Italy) A Motti	6	6
WC	(Italy) S Ianni (Italy) M Trevisan	4	4
WC	(Argentina) F Delbonis (Argentina) Nicolás Pastor	4	2
2	(Germany) M Emmrich (United Kingdom) K Skupski	6	6

Semifinals
1	(Germany) D Brown (Croatia) L Zovko	6	3	[10]
3	(France) O Charroin (India) P Raja	3	6	[7]
(Italy) A di Mauro (Italy) A Motti	7^{7}	7^{9}
2	(Germany) M Emmrich (United Kingdom) K Skupski	6^{4}	6^{7}

Final
1	(Germany) D Brown (Croatia) L Zovko	7^{7}	7
(Italy) A di Mauro (Italy) A Motti	6^{4}	5
