= 2015 Antonio Savoldi–Marco Cò – Trofeo Dimmidisì – Singles =

Marco Cò – Trofeo Dimmidisì – Singles
- 2015 Antonio Savoldi–Marco Cò – Trofeo Dimmidisì

Final
- Champion: (Russia) Andrey Kuznetsov
- Runner-up: (Spain) Daniel Muñoz de la Nava
- Score: 6–4, 3–6, 6–1

Events
Singles	Doubles
← 2011 ·	Antonio Savoldi–Marco Cò – Trofeo Dimmidisì	· 2016 →

This was the first edition of the tournament since 2011.

Andrey Kuznetsov won the tournament, defeating Daniel Muñoz de la Nava in the final.

== Seeds ==
1. (Spain) Daniel Muñoz de la Nava (final)
2. (Russia) Andrey Kuznetsov (champion)
3. (France) Kenny de Schepper (quarterfinals)
4. (Argentina) Carlos Berlocq (first round)
5. (Slovakia) Andrej Martin (second round)
6. (Chile) Hans Podlipnik-Castillo (second round)
7. (Spain) Roberto Carballés Baena (first round)
8. (Italy) Filippo Volandri (semifinals, retired)

== Draw ==
=== Key ===
- Q = Qualifier
- WC = Wild card
- LL = Lucky loser
- Alt = Alternate
- SE = Special exempt
- PR = Protected ranking
- ITF = ITF entry
- JE = Junior exempt
- w/o = Walkover
- r = Retired
- d = Defaulted
- SR = Special ranking

=== Finals ===
Semifinals
1	(Spain) Daniel Muñoz de la Nava	6	2
8	(Italy) Filippo Volandri	3	0^{r}
Q	(Italy) Lorenzo Giustino	1	4
2	(Russia) Andrey Kuznetsov	6	6

Final
1	(Spain) Daniel Muñoz de la Nava	4	6	1
2	(Russia) Andrey Kuznetsov	6	3	6

=== Top half ===
First round
1	(Spain) D Muñoz de la Nava	6	6
(Switzerland) A Bossel	3	2
WC	(Italy) Riccardo Sinicropi	1	3
(Germany) D Brands	6	6
(France) A Musialek	3	6^{2}
WC	(Italy) F Gaio	6	7^{7}
(Spain) R Ramírez Hidalgo	4	7^{7}	1
5	(Slovakia) A Martin	6	6^{2}	6
4	(Argentina) C Berlocq	5	7	1
Q	(Chile) C Garin	7	5	6
(Austria) D Novak	4	3
(Italy) S Caruso	6	6
(Romania) A Ungur	6^{4}	3
(Argentina) P Cachin	7^{7}	6
(Italy) A Giannessi	6	2	0^{r}
8	(Italy) F Volandri	4	6	2

Second round
1	(Spain) D Muñoz de la Nava	7^{10}	6
(Germany) D Brands	6^{8}	4
WC	(Italy) F Gaio	7^{7}	6
5	(Slovakia) A Martin	6^{3}	0
Q	(Chile) C Garin	4	6	3
(Italy) S Caruso	6	1	6
(Argentina) P Cachin	2	3
8	(Italy) F Volandri	6	6

Quarterfinals
1	(Spain) D Muñoz de la Nava	6	1	7^{7}
WC	(Italy) F Gaio	1	6	6^{5}
(Italy) S Caruso	1	3
8	(Italy) F Volandri	6	6

Semifinals
1	(Spain) D Muñoz de la Nava	6	2
8	(Italy) F Volandri	3	0^{r}

=== Bottom half ===
First round
6	(Chile) H Podlipnik-Castillo	6	6
(Belarus) M Dubarenco	4	0
WC	(Italy) Erik Crepaldi	3	6^{2}
Q	(Italy) L Giustino	6	7^{7}
SE	(Spain) P Riba	6	6
WC	(Italy) L Sonego	3	2
(Romania) V Hănescu	6	4	1
3	(France) K de Schepper	3	6	6
7	(Spain) R Carballés Baena	2	5
(Chile) JC Sáez	6	7
(Italy) R Bellotti	4	6	4
(Argentina) M Trungelliti	6	4	6
Q	(Portugal) FF Silva	7^{7}	6
Q	(Slovenia) G Žemlja	6^{4}	3
(Croatia) A Veić	2	2
2	(Russia) A Kuznetsov	6	6

Second round
6	(Chile) H Podlipnik-Castillo	2	6	3
Q	(Italy) L Giustino	6	4	6
SE	(Spain) P Riba
3	(France) K de Schepper	w/o
(Chile) JC Sáez	3	6	7
(Argentina) M Trungelliti	6	3	5
Q	(Portugal) FF Silva	4	6^{5}
2	(Russia) A Kuznetsov	6	7^{7}

Quarterfinals
Q	(Italy) L Giustino	3	6	6
3	(France) K de Schepper	6	4	3
(Chile) JC Sáez	6^{2}	0
2	(Russia) A Kuznetsov	7^{7}	6

Semifinals
Q	(Italy) L Giustino	1	4
2	(Russia) A Kuznetsov	6	6
