= 2010 Antonio Savoldi–Marco Cò – Trofeo Dimmidisì – Singles =

Marco Cò – Trofeo Dimmidisì – Singles
- 2010 Antonio Savoldi–Marco Cò – Trofeo Dimmidisì

Final
- Champion: (Netherlands) Robin Haase
- Runner-up: (Italy) Marco Crugnola
- Score: 6–3, 6–2

Events
Singles	Doubles
← 2009 ·	Antonio Savoldi–Marco Cò – Trofeo Dimmidisì	· 2011 →

Federico del Bonis was the defending champion but decided not to participate this year.
Robin Haase won the final against Marco Crugnola 6–3, 6–2.

== Seeds ==
1. (Italy) Filippo Volandri (quarterfinals)
2. (Netherlands) Robin Haase (champion)
3. (Belgium) Steve Darcis (quarterfinals)
4. (Austria) Daniel Köllerer (first round)
5. (Netherlands) Jesse Huta Galung (first round)
6. (Belgium) Christophe Rochus (first round, retired)
7. (France) Laurent Recouderc (second round)
8. (Argentina) Diego Junqueira (first round, retired)

== Draw ==
=== Key ===
- Q = Qualifier
- WC = Wild card
- LL = Lucky loser
- Alt = Alternate
- SE = Special exempt
- PR = Protected ranking
- ITF = ITF entry
- JE = Junior exempt
- w/o = Walkover
- r = Retired
- d = Defaulted
- SR = Special ranking

=== Finals ===
Semifinals
WC	(Italy) Alberto Brizzi	7	6^{3}	2
Q	(Italy) Marco Crugnola	6^{5}	7	6
(Romania) Victor Crivoi	6^{4}	6	1
2	(Netherlands) Robin Haase	7	0	6

Final
Q	(Italy) Marco Crugnola	3	2
2	(Netherlands) Robin Haase	6	6

=== Top half ===
First round
1/WC	(Italy) F Volandri	3	6	7
(Australia) R Junaid	6	2	5
PR	(Czech Republic) J Vaněk	6	6
(Colombia) A González	4	0
Q	(Chile) A García	6	6
(Italy) S Galvani	2	4
WC	(Italy) A Brizzi	6	1
8	(Argentina) D Junqueira	1	0	r
4	(Austria) D Köllerer	4	6	5
Q	(Italy) M Crugnola	6	4	7
Q	(Germany) M Zimmermann	3	2
(Spain) P Santos	6	6
(Netherlands) T Schoorel	6	6
(Spain) C Poch-Gradin	1	2
Q	(Germany) M Sieber	1	3
7	(France) L Recouderc	6	6

Second round
1/WC	(Italy) F Volandri	6	6
PR	(Czech Republic) J Vaněk	4	4
Q	(Chile) A García	4	4
WC	(Italy) A Brizzi	6	6
Q	(Italy) M Crugnola	6	2
(Spain) P Santos	3	2	r
(Netherlands) T Schoorel	6	6^{4}	6
7	(France) L Recouderc	3	7	4

Quarterfinals
1/WC	(Italy) F Volandri	3	7	4
WC	(Italy) A Brizzi	6	5	6
Q	(Italy) M Crugnola	4	6	6
(Netherlands) T Schoorel	6	3	3

Semifinals
WC	(Italy) A Brizzi	7	6^{3}	2
Q	(Italy) M Crugnola	6^{5}	7	6

=== Bottom half ===
First round
6	(Belgium) C Rochus	2	0	r
(Romania) V Crivoi	6	2
(Spain) A Boje-Ordóñez	1	6^{4}
(Spain) G Trujillo-Soler	6	7
WC	(Italy) F Aldi	3	2
(Chile) J Aguilar	6	6
PR	(Argentina) D Hartfield	4	4
3	(Belgium) S Darcis	6	6
5	(Netherlands) J Huta Galung	4	6	3
(Argentina) M Alund	6	4	6
(Italy) A di Mauro	6	6
WC	(Italy) M Trevisan	4	4
(Germany) M Bachinger	1	4
(Portugal) J Sousa	6	6
(Argentina) J-M Aranguren	2	6^{3}
2	(Netherlands) R Haase	6	7

Second round
(Romania) V Crivoi	6	6
(Spain) G Trujillo-Soler	4	2
(Chile) J Aguilar	6^{2}	1
3	(Belgium) S Darcis	7	6
(Argentina) M Alund	1	2
(Italy) A di Mauro	6	6
(Portugal) J Sousa	2	6^{6}
2	(Netherlands) R Haase	6	7

Quarterfinals
(Romania) V Crivoi	1	6	6
3	(Belgium) S Darcis	6	3	4
(Italy) A di Mauro	3	0
2	(Netherlands) R Haase	6	6

Semifinals
(Romania) V Crivoi	6^{4}	6	1
2	(Netherlands) R Haase	7	0	6
