= 2010 Antonio Savoldi–Marco Cò – Trofeo Dimmidisì – Doubles =

Marco Cò – Trofeo Dimmidisì – Doubles
- 2010 Antonio Savoldi–Marco Cò – Trofeo Dimmidisì

Final
- Champions: (Netherlands) Robin Haase (Netherlands) Thomas Schoorel
- Runners-up: (Argentina) Diego Junqueira (Spain) Gabriel Trujillo-Soler
- Score: 6–4, 6–4

Events
Singles	Doubles
← 2009 ·	Antonio Savoldi–Marco Cò – Trofeo Dimmidisì	· 2011 →

Alessio di Mauro and Simone Vagnozzi were the defending champions, but Vagnozzi decided not to participate.
di Mauro partnered with Alessandro Motti, but they lost to Diego Junqueira and Gabriel Trujillo-Soler in the quarterfinals.
Robin Haase and Thomas Schoorel won the title, defeating Diego Junqueira and Gabriel Trujillo-Soler 6–4, 6–4 in the finals.

== Seeds ==
1. (United States) James Cerretani / (Canada) Adil Shamasdin (semifinals)
2. (United States) Brian Battistone / (United Kingdom) Jonathan Marray (first round)
3. (Poland) Mateusz Kowalczyk / (Germany) Frank Moser (quarterfinals)
4. (Poland) Tomasz Bednarek / (Australia) Rameez Junaid (first round)

== Draw ==
=== Key ===
- Q = Qualifier
- WC = Wild card
- LL = Lucky loser
- Alt = Alternate
- SE = Special exempt
- PR = Protected ranking
- ITF = ITF entry
- JE = Junior exempt
- w/o = Walkover
- r = Retired
- d = Defaulted
- SR = Special ranking

=== Draw ===
First round
1	(United States) J Cerretani (Canada) A Shamasdin	6	6
WC	(Italy) F Aldi (Italy) M Crugnola	4	2
(Colombia) A González (Spain) P Santos	1	5
(Argentina) M Alund (Spain) C Poch-Gradin	6	7
4	(Poland) T Bednarek (Australia) R Junaid	2	1
(Italy) A di Mauro (Italy) A Motti	6	6
(Argentina) D Junqueira (Spain) G Trujillo-Soler	3	6	[10]
WC	(Argentina) J-M Aranguren (Italy) G Naso	6	4	[8]
(Romania) V Crivoi (Austria) R Eitzinger	3	6	[7]
(Netherlands) R Haase (Netherlands) T Schoorel	6	2	[10]
(Switzerland) Y Allegro (Netherlands) J Huta Galung	2	4
3	(Poland) M Kowalczyk (Germany) F Moser	6	6
ALT	(Chile) J Aguilar (Chile) A García	4	2
PR	(Czech Republic) D Škoch (Czech Republic) J Vaněk	6	6
WC	(Italy) A Brizzi (Italy) W Trusendi	7	7
2	(United States) B Battistone (United Kingdom) J Marray	6^{1}	6^{2}

Quarterfinals
1	(United States) J Cerretani (Canada) A Shamasdin	6	6
(Argentina) M Alund (Spain) C Poch-Gradin	2	1
(Italy) A di Mauro (Italy) A Motti	4	3
(Argentina) D Junqueira (Spain) G Trujillo-Soler	6	6
(Netherlands) R Haase (Netherlands) T Schoorel	6	6
3	(Poland) M Kowalczyk (Germany) F Moser	2	3
PR	(Czech Republic) D Škoch (Czech Republic) J Vaněk	6	5	[12]
WC	(Italy) A Brizzi (Italy) W Trusendi	1	7	[10]

Semifinals
1	(United States) J Cerretani (Canada) A Shamasdin	5	3
(Argentina) D Junqueira (Spain) G Trujillo-Soler	7	6
(Netherlands) R Haase (Netherlands) T Schoorel	6	6
PR	(Czech Republic) D Škoch (Czech Republic) J Vaněk	4	4

Finals
(Argentina) D Junqueira (Spain) G Trujillo-Soler	4	4
(Netherlands) R Haase (Netherlands) T Schoorel	6	6
