= 2016 Antonio Savoldi–Marco Cò – Trofeo Dimmidisì – Doubles =

Marco Cò – Trofeo Dimmidisì – Doubles
- 2016 Antonio Savoldi–Marco Cò – Trofeo Dimmidisì

Final
- Champion: (Croatia) Nikola Mektić (Croatia) Antonio Šančić
- Runner-up: (Argentina) Juan Ignacio Galarza (Argentina) Leonardo Mayer
- Score: 7–5, 6–1

Events
Singles	Doubles
← 2015 ·	Antonio Savoldi–Marco Cò – Trofeo Dimmidisì	· 2017 →

Flavio Cipolla and Daniel Muñoz de la Nava were the defending champions but chose not to defend their title.

Nikola Mektić and Antonio Šančić won the title after defeating Juan Ignacio Galarza and Leonardo Mayer 7–5, 6–1 in the final.

== Seeds ==
1. (Croatia) Nikola Mektić / (Croatia) Antonio Šančić (champions)
2. (Germany) Gero Kretschmer / (Germany) Alexander Satschko (first round)
3. (Italy) Alessandro Motti / (Chinese Taipei) Peng Hsien-yin (quarterfinals)
4. (Netherlands) Mark Vervoort / (Serbia) Ilija Vučić (semifinals)

== Draw ==
=== Key ===
- Q = Qualifier
- WC = Wild card
- LL = Lucky loser
- Alt = Alternate
- SE = Special exempt
- PR = Protected ranking
- ITF = ITF entry
- JE = Junior exempt
- w/o = Walkover
- r = Retired
- d = Defaulted
- SR = Special ranking

First round
1	(Croatia) N Mektić (Croatia) A Šančić	7^{9}	6
(Argentina) P Cachin (France) K de Schepper	6^{7}	3
Alt	(Portugal) FF Silva (Spain) D Vega Hernández	w/o
(Japan) T Daniel (Japan) A Santillan
3	(Italy) A Motti (Chinese Taipei) H-y Peng	7^{10}	6
PR	(Uruguay) A Behar (Brazil) F de Paula	6^{8}	3
(Spain) D Gimeno-Traver (Spain) P Martínez	6^{2}	6	[9]
(Lithuania) L Grigelis (Romania) A Ungur	7^{7}	0	[11]
WC	(Italy) F Baldi (Italy) A Pellegrino	7	5	[3]
(Slovakia) A Martin (Austria) G Melzer	5	7	[10]
(Switzerland) L Margaroli (Austria) L Miedler	1	2
4	(Netherlands) M Vervoort (Serbia) Ilija Vučić	6	6
(Argentina) Juan Ignacio Galarza (Argentina) L Mayer	6	6
WC	(Romania) V-M Anagnastopol (Romania) VV Cornea	2	2
(Belarus) A Bury (Czech Republic) R Jebavý	7^{7}	1	[10]
2	(Germany) G Kretschmer (Germany) A Satschko	6^{4}	6	[5]

Quarterfinals
1	(Croatia) N Mektić (Croatia) A Šančić	6	6
Alt	(Portugal) FF Silva (Spain) D Vega Hernández	2	3
3	(Italy) A Motti (Chinese Taipei) H-y Peng	6	3	[8]
(Lithuania) L Grigelis (Romania) A Ungur	4	6	[10]
(Slovakia) A Martin (Austria) G Melzer	4	4
4	(Netherlands) M Vervoort (Serbia) I Vučić	6	6
(Argentina) JI Galarza (Argentina) L Mayer	7^{7}	6
(Belarus) A Bury (Czech Republic) R Jebavý	6^{4}	3

Semifinals
1	(Croatia) N Mektić (Croatia) A Šančić	6	6
(Lithuania) L Grigelis (Romania) A Ungur	1	2
4	(Netherlands) M Vervoort (Serbia) I Vučić	4	6^{1}
(Argentina) JI Galarza (Argentina) L Mayer	6	7^{7}

Final
1	(Croatia) N Mektić (Croatia) A Šančić	7	6
(Argentina) JI Galarza (Argentina) L Mayer	5	1
