= 2011 Antonio Savoldi–Marco Cò – Trofeo Dimmidisì – Singles =

Marco Cò – Trofeo Dimmidisì – Singles
- 2011 Antonio Savoldi–Marco Cò – Trofeo Dimmidisì

Final
- Champion: (Romania) Adrian Ungur
- Runner-up: (Germany) Peter Gojowczyk
- Score: 4–6, 7–6^{(7–4)}, 6–2

Events
Singles	Doubles
- Antonio Savoldi–Marco Cò – Trofeo Dimmidisì

Robin Haase was the defending champion, but decided to participate in the Winston-Salem Open instead.

Adrian Ungur won the tournament after defeating qualifier and sensation of this tournament Peter Gojowczyk 4–6, 7–6^{(7–4)}, 6–2 in the final.

== Seeds ==
1. (France) Stéphane Robert (second round)
2. (Netherlands) Thiemo de Bakker (first round)
3. (Slovakia) Martin Kližan (semifinals)
4. (Germany) Dustin Brown (quarterfinals)
5. (Czech Republic) Jaroslav Pospíšil (first round)
6. (France) Florent Serra (second round)
7. (Italy) Simone Bolelli (second round)
8. (Spain) Rubén Ramírez Hidalgo (semifinals)

== Draw ==
Key

- Q = Qualifier
- WC = Wild card
- LL = Lucky loser
- Alt = Alternate
- ITF = ITF entry
- PR = Protected ranking
- SR = Special ranking
- SE = Special exempt
- JE = Junior exempt
- JR = Junior Accelerator Programme entrant
- CO = College Accelerator Programme entrant
- NG = Next Gen Accelerator Program entrant
- w/o = Walkover
- r = Retired
- d = Defaulted

=== Finals ===
Semifinals
(Romania) Adrian Ungur	6	6
8	(Spain) Rubén Ramírez Hidalgo	3	2
3	(Slovakia) Martin Kližan	6^{5}	3
Q	(Germany) Peter Gojowczyk	7^{7}	6

Final
(Romania) Adrian Ungur	4	7^{7}	6
Q	(Germany) Peter Gojowczyk	6	6^{4}	2

=== Top half ===
First round
1	(France) S Robert	6	6
SE	(Argentina) Nicolás Pastor	2	1
Alt	(Italy) M Crugnola	3	6	7
(Italy) A di Mauro	6	1	5
(Romania) A Ungur	6	7^{7}
(Germany) S Greul	4	6^{4}
(Chile) J Aguilar	4	2
6	(France) F Serra	6	6
4	(Germany) D Brown	5	7^{7}	6
WC	(Italy) M Trevisan	7	6^{2}	4
WC	(Kazakhstan) E Korolev	6	6
(Spain) P Carreño-Busta	3	1
Q	(Italy) W Trusendi	3	6	6
(Argentina) Facundo Argüello	6	1	2
(Belarus) U Ignatik	7^{7}	1	0^{r}
8	(Spain) R Ramírez Hidalgo	6^{4}	6	4

Second round
1	(France) S Robert	5	4
Alt	(Italy) M Crugnola	7	6
(Romania) A Ungur	6^{3}	7^{8}	7
6	(France) F Serra	7^{7}	6^{6}	5
4	(Germany) D Brown	7^{7}	6
WC	(Kazakhstan) E Korolev	6^{2}	2
Q	(Italy) W Trusendi	4	5
8	(Spain) R Ramírez Hidalgo	6	7

Quarterfinals
Alt	(Italy) M Crugnola	6	3	2
(Romania) A Ungur	1	6	6
4	(Germany) D Brown	1	4
8	(Spain) R Ramírez Hidalgo	6	6

Semifinals
(Romania) A Ungur	6	6
8	(Spain) R Ramírez Hidalgo	3	2

=== Bottom half ===
First round
5	(Czech Republic) J Pospíšil	4	2
WC	(Argentina) F Delbonis	6	6
(Italy) S Vagnozzi	6	6
(Romania) V Crivoi	0	3
Q	(Switzerland) M Lammer	6	2	6
(Germany) D Gremelmayr	3	6	1
(Kazakhstan) Y Schukin	5	3
3	(Slovakia) M Kližan	7	6
7	(Italy) S Bolelli	6	6
(Czech Republic) J Hájek	3	3
Q	(Serbia) B Pašanski	6	6
(Spain) I Navarro	0	4
(Spain) D Muñoz-De La Nava	6	6
WC	(Austria) T Muster	2	3
Q	(Germany) P Gojowczyk	7	6
2	(Netherlands) T de Bakker	5	3

Second round
WC	(Argentina) F Delbonis	6	6
(Italy) S Vagnozzi	3	0
Q	(Switzerland) M Lammer	4	3
3	(Slovakia) M Kližan	6	6
7	(Italy) S Bolelli	4	6	6^{4}
Q	(Serbia) B Pašanski	6	1	7^{7}
(Spain) D Muñoz-De La Nava	1	4
Q	(Germany) P Gojowczyk	6	6

Quarterfinals
WC	(Argentina) F Delbonis	3	6	4
3	(Slovakia) M Kližan	6	4	6
Q	(Serbia) B Pašanski	6^{3}	2
Q	(Germany) P Gojowczyk	7^{7}	6

Semifinals
3	(Slovakia) M Kližan	6^{5}	3
Q	(Germany) P Gojowczyk	7^{7}	6
