= 2016 Antonio Savoldi–Marco Cò – Trofeo Dimmidisì – Singles =

Marco Cò – Trofeo Dimmidisì – Singles
- 2016 Antonio Savoldi–Marco Cò – Trofeo Dimmidisì

Final
- Champion: (Argentina) Leonardo Mayer
- Runner-up: (Serbia) Filip Krajinović
- Score: 7–6^{(7–3)}, 7–5

Events
Singles	Doubles
← 2015 ·	Antonio Savoldi–Marco Cò – Trofeo Dimmidisì	· 2017 →

Andrey Kuznetsov was the defending champion but chose not to defend his title.

Leonardo Mayer won the title after defeating Filip Krajinović 7–6^{(7–3)}, 7–5 in the final.

== Seeds ==
1. (Austria) Gerald Melzer (quarterfinals)
2. (Japan) Taro Daniel (quarterfinals)
3. (Slovakia) Andrej Martin (first round)
4. (Spain) Daniel Gimeno-Traver (second round)
5. (Argentina) Leonardo Mayer (champion)
6. (Italy) Marco Cecchinato (first round)
7. (Sweden) Elias Ymer (second round)
8. (Serbia) Filip Krajinović (final)

== Draw ==
=== Key ===
- Q = Qualifier
- WC = Wild card
- LL = Lucky loser
- Alt = Alternate
- SE = Special exempt
- PR = Protected ranking
- ITF = ITF entry
- JE = Junior exempt
- w/o = Walkover
- r = Retired
- d = Defaulted
- SR = Special ranking

=== Finals ===
Semifinals
5	(Argentina) Leonardo Mayer	3	7^{8}	6
(Italy) Matteo Donati	6	6^{6}	4
Q	(France) Jonathan Eysseric	5	1
8	(Serbia) Filip Krajinović	7	6

Final
5	(Argentina) Leonardo Mayer	7^{7}	7
8	(Serbia) Filip Krajinović	6^{3}	5

=== Top half ===
First round
1	(Austria) G Melzer	6	6
WC	(Italy) A Pellegrino	2	4
Q	(Italy) W Trusendi	6	3
(Belgium) Clément Geens	1	0^{r}
Q	(Croatia) N Mektić	4	6	6
(Serbia) M Janković	6	3	2
Q	(Lithuania) L Grigelis	4	2
5	(Argentina) L Mayer	6	6
4	(Spain) D Gimeno-Traver	6	6
(Portugal) FF Silva	2	2
(Italy) M Donati	6	7^{9}
(Italy) F Volandri	3	6^{7}
Alt	(Argentina) P Cachin	6	3	5
(France) K de Schepper	4	6	7
(Germany) N Langer	6	6
6	(Italy) M Cecchinato	4	4

Second round
1	(Austria) G Melzer	6	6
Q	(Italy) W Trusendi	2	2
Q	(Croatia) N Mektić	4	4
5	(Argentina) L Mayer	6	6
4	(Spain) D Gimeno-Traver	6^{5}	6	4
(Italy) M Donati	7^{7}	1	6
(France) K de Schepper	4	5
(Germany) N Langer	6	7

Quarterfinals
1	(Austria) G Melzer	6	4	4
5	(Argentina) L Mayer	2	6	6
(Italy) M Donati	6^{2}	6	6
(Germany) N Langer	7^{7}	4	3

Semifinals
5	(Argentina) L Mayer	3	7^{8}	6
(Italy) M Donati	6	6^{6}	4

=== Bottom half ===
First round
7	(Sweden) E Ymer	6	7^{7}
WC	(Italy) Edoardo Eremin	4	6^{4}
Q	(France) J Eysseric	2	6	6
(France) G Sakharov	6	1	1
SE	(Germany) M Marterer	6	6
(Austria) B Trinker	1	4
WC	(Italy) L Sonego	6	6
3	(Slovakia) A Martin	3	2
8	(Serbia) F Krajinović	6	6
(Japan) A Santillan	3	3
(Chile) C Garin	1	1
(Romania) A Ungur	6	6
PR	(Brazil) F de Paula	7^{7}	6^{3}	7
WC	(Greece) S Tsitsipas	6^{4}	7^{7}	5
(Czech Republic) J Mertl	6^{10}	2
2	(Japan) T Daniel	7^{12}	6

Second round
7	(Sweden) E Ymer	2	4
Q	(France) J Eysseric	6	6
SE	(Germany) M Marterer	6^{5}	5
WC	(Italy) L Sonego	7^{7}	7
8	(Serbia) F Krajinović	6	6
(Romania) A Ungur	3	4
PR	(Brazil) F de Paula	1	3
2	(Japan) T Daniel	6	6

Quarterfinals
Q	(France) J Eysseric	4	6	7
WC	(Italy) L Sonego	6	3	5
8	(Serbia) F Krajinović	6	6
2	(Japan) T Daniel	4	3

Semifinals
Q	(France) J Eysseric	5	1
8	(Serbia) F Krajinović	7	6
