= 2009 Antonio Savoldi–Marco Cò – Trofeo Dimmidisì – Singles =

Marco Cò – Trofeo Dimmidisì – Singles
- 2009 Antonio Savoldi–Marco Cò – Trofeo Dimmidisì

Final
- Champion: (Argentina) Federico del Bonis
- Runner-up: (Portugal) Leonardo Tavares
- Score: 6–1, 6–3

Events
Singles	Doubles
← 2008 ·	Antonio Savoldi–Marco Cò – Trofeo Dimmidisì	· 2010 →

Victor Crivoi didn't try to defend his 2008 title.
Qualifier Federico del Bonis became the new champion, after defeating another qualifier Leonardo Tavares 6–1, 6–3 in the final.

== Seeds ==
1. (Spain) Pere Riba (second round)
2. (Czech Republic) Jan Hájek (first round)
3. (Italy) Tomas Tenconi (first round)
4. (Czech Republic) Jiří Vaněk (semifinals)
5. (Argentina) Eduardo Schwank (quarterfinals)
6. (Italy) Alessio di Mauro (second round)
7. (Ukraine) Oleksandr Dolgopolov Jr. (first round)
8. (Croatia) Antonio Veić (second round)

== Draw ==
=== Key ===
- Q = Qualifier
- WC = Wild card
- LL = Lucky loser
- Alt = Alternate
- SE = Special exempt
- PR = Protected ranking
- ITF = ITF entry
- JE = Junior exempt
- w/o = Walkover
- r = Retired
- d = Defaulted
- SR = Special ranking

=== Final four ===
Semifinals
ALT	(Monaco) Benjamin Balleret	2	6	2
Q	(Argentina) Federico del Bonis	6	4	6
4	(Czech Republic) Jiří Vaněk	6	5	6^{2}
Q	(Portugal) Leonardo Tavares	4	7	7

Final
Q	(Argentina) Federico del Bonis	6	6
Q	(Portugal) Leonardo Tavares	1	3

=== Top half ===
First round
1	(Spain) P Riba	6	7
(Germany) A Flock	4	6^{3}
(Argentina) M Alund	6	6^{4}	6
(Spain) F Vicente	3	7	0
SE	(Spain) P Clar-Rosselló	1	4
ALT	(Monaco) B Balleret	6	6
(Italy) A Arnaboldi	1	6	2
6	(Italy) A di Mauro	6	2	6
3	(Italy) T Tenconi	5	6	1
WC	(Italy) D Giorgini	7	4	6
(Italy) S Vagnozzi	6	6
WC	(Lithuania) L Grigelis	4	4
WC	(Italy) M Trevisan	3	1
Q	(Argentina) F del Bonis	6	6
WC	(Serbia) F Tomanić	1	1
8	(Croatia) A Veić	6	6

Second round
1	(Spain) P Riba	5	2
(Argentina) M Alund	7	6
ALT	(Monaco) B Balleret	6	2	6
6	(Italy) A di Mauro	4	6	3
WC	(Italy) D Giorgini	6	6
(Italy) S Vagnozzi	4	0
Q	(Argentina) F del Bonis	6	6
8	(Croatia) A Veić	2	2

Quarterfinals
(Argentina) M Alund	4	6	2
ALT	(Monaco) B Balleret	6	4	6
WC	(Italy) D Giorgini	3	3
Q	(Argentina) F del Bonis	6	6

Semifinals
ALT	(Monaco) B Balleret	2	6	2
Q	(Argentina) F del Bonis	6	2	6

=== Bottom half ===
First round
5	(Argentina) E Schwank	6	3	6
SE	(Austria) P Oswald	2	6	3
(Spain) F Volandri	4	6	5
(Spain) MÁ López Jaén	6	3	7
(Slovakia) P Červenák	6	4	6
(Netherlands) J Huta Galung	3	6	2
(Argentina) J-M Aranguren	6	2	1
4	(Czech Republic) J Vaněk	3	6	6
7	(Ukraine) O Dolgopolov Jr.	6^{3}	5
(France) R Jouan	7	7
Q	(Portugal) L Tavares	5	7	6
(Netherlands) M Middelkoop	7	5	2
Q	(Italy) S Ianni	5	2	r
(Italy) A Brizzi	7	4
Q	(Argentina) C Berlocq	7	6
2	(Czech Republic) J Hájek	5	2

Second round
5	(Argentina) E Schwank	7	6
(Spain) MÁ López Jaén	6^{1}	3
(Slovakia) P Červenák	3	4
4	(Czech Republic) J Vaněk	6	6
(France) R Jouan	4	3
Q	(Portugal) L Tavares	6	6
(Italy) A Brizzi	3	6	3
Q	(Argentina) C Berlocq	6	3	6

Quarterfinals
5	(Argentina) E Schwank	3	7	3
4	(Czech Republic) J Vaněk	6	6^{6}	6
Q	(Portugal) L Tavares	6	7
Q	(Argentina) C Berlocq	3	6^{2}

Semifinals
4	(Czech Republic) J Vaněk	6	5	6^{2}
Q	(Portugal) L Tavares	4	7	7
