= 2009 Antonio Savoldi–Marco Cò – Trofeo Dimmidisì – Doubles =

Marco Cò – Trofeo Dimmidisì – Doubles
- 2009 Antonio Savoldi–Marco Cò – Trofeo Dimmidisì

Final
- Champions: (Italy) Alessio di Mauro (Italy) Simone Vagnozzi
- Runners-up: (Switzerland) Yves Allegro (Netherlands) Jesse Huta Galung
- Score: 6–4, 3–6, [10–4]

Events
Singles	Doubles
← 2008 ·	Antonio Savoldi–Marco Cò – Trofeo Dimmidisì	· 2010 →

Thomas Fabbiano and Boris Pašanski won the doubles competition in 2008.
Fabbiano teamed up with Matteo Marrai, but they were eliminated by Philipp Marx and Rogier Wassen already in the first round. Alessio di Mauro and Simone Vagnozzi won in the final 6–4, 3–6, [10–4], against Yves Allegro and Jesse Huta Galung.

== Seeds ==
1. (Germany) Philipp Marx / (Netherlands) Rogier Wassen (quarterfinals)
2. (Thailand) Sanchai Ratiwatana / (Thailand) Sonchat Ratiwatana (quarterfinals)
3. (India) Rohan Bopanna / (Germany) Frank Moser (semifinals)
4. (Israel) Amir Hadad / (Croatia) Lovro Zovko (quarterfinals)

== Draw ==
=== Key ===
- Q = Qualifier
- WC = Wild card
- LL = Lucky loser
- Alt = Alternate
- SE = Special exempt
- PR = Protected ranking
- ITF = ITF entry
- JE = Junior exempt
- w/o = Walkover
- r = Retired
- d = Defaulted
- SR = Special ranking

=== Draw ===
First round
1	(Germany) P Marx (Netherlands) R Wassen	6^{5}	7	[12]
WC	(Italy) T Fabbiano (Italy) M Marrai	7	5	[10]
WC	(Italy) F Aldi (Italy) A Brizzi	5	3
(Switzerland) Y Allegro (Netherlands) J Huta Galung	7	6
4	(Israel) A Hadad (Croatia) L Zovko	7	3	[10]
(Italy) T Tenconi (Italy) U Vico	5	6	[5]
(Spain) MÁ López Jaén (Spain) P Riba	3	6^{3}
(Russia) D Sitak (Croatia) A Veić	6	7
(United Kingdom) J Delgado (United Kingdom) J Murray	4	6	[10]
WC	(Argentina) C Berlocq (Argentina) D Junqueira	6	1	[6]
(Australia) R Junaid (Austria) P Oswald	3	4
3	(India) R Bopanna (Germany) F Moser	6	6
(India) H Mankad (Italy) A Motti	4	4
(Italy) A di Mauro (Italy) S Vagnozzi	6	6
(Czech Republic) J Hájek (Czech Republic) D Karol	5	6^{4}
2	(Thailand) Sa Ratiwatana (Thailand) So Ratiwatana	7	7

Quarterfinals
1	(Germany) P Marx (Netherlands) R Wassen	5	4
(Switzerland) Y Allegro (Netherlands) J Huta Galung	7	6
4	(Israel) A Hadad (Croatia) L Zovko	2	5
(Russia) D Sitak (Croatia) A Veić	6	7
(United Kingdom) J Delgado (United Kingdom) J Murray	3	3
3	(India) R Bopanna (Germany) F Moser	6	6
(Italy) A di Mauro (Italy) S Vagnozzi	6	6
2	(Thailand) Sa Ratiwatana (Thailand) So Ratiwatana	2	4

Semifinals
(Switzerland) Y Allegro (Netherlands) J Huta Galung	6	6
(Russia) D Sitak (Croatia) A Veić	3	4
3	(India) R Bopanna (Germany) F Moser	4	4
(Italy) A di Mauro (Italy) S Vagnozzi	6	6

Finals
(Switzerland) Y Allegro (Netherlands) J Huta Galung	4	6	[6]
(Italy) A di Mauro (Italy) S Vagnozzi	6	3	[10]
