= 2015 Antonio Savoldi–Marco Cò – Trofeo Dimmidisì – Doubles =

Marco Cò – Trofeo Dimmidisì – Doubles
- 2015 Antonio Savoldi–Marco Cò – Trofeo Dimmidisì

Final
- Champions: (Italy) Flavio Cipolla (Spain) Daniel Muñoz de la Nava
- Runners-up: (Germany) Gero Kretschmer (Germany) Alexander Satschko
- Score: 7–6^{(7–5)}, 3–6, [11–9]

Events
Singles	Doubles
- Antonio Savoldi–Marco Cò – Trofeo Dimmidisì

This was the first edition of the tournament since 2011.

Flavio Cipolla and Daniel Muñoz de la Nava won the tournament, defeating Gero Kretschmer and Alexander Satschko in the final.

== Seeds ==
1. (Argentina) Carlos Berlocq / (Czech Republic) František Čermák (first round)
2. (Germany) Gero Kretschmer / (Germany) Alexander Satschko (final)
3. (Croatia) Dino Marcan / (Croatia) Antonio Šančić (semifinals)
4. (Slovakia) Andrej Martin / (Slovakia) Igor Zelenay (quarterfinals)

== Draw ==
Key

- Q = Qualifier
- WC = Wild card
- LL = Lucky loser
- Alt = Alternate
- ITF = ITF entry
- PR = Protected ranking
- SR = Special ranking
- SE = Special exempt
- JE = Junior exempt
- JR = Junior Accelerator Programme entrant
- CO = College Accelerator Programme entrant
- NG = Next Gen Accelerator Program entrant
- w/o = Walkover
- r = Retired
- d = Defaulted

First round
1	(Argentina) C Berlocq (Czech Republic) F Čermák	5	6	[8]
(Italy) F Cipolla (Spain) D Muñoz de la Nava	7	4	[10]
(Chinese Taipei) H-h Lee (Italy) A Motti	6^{5}	3
(United States) J Cerretani (Romania) C Pavăl	7^{7}	6
3	(Croatia) D Marcan (Croatia) A Šančić	7	4	[10]
WC	(Italy) F Gaio (Italy) A Giannessi	5	6	[8]
WC	(Italy) A Virgili (Italy) Matteo Volante	6	6
(Romania) Alexandru-Daniel Carpen (France) K de Schepper	4	1
(Monaco) R Arneodo (Monaco) B Balleret	4	6^{3}
(Uruguay) A Behar (Spain) E López-Pérez	6	7^{7}
(Spain) R Carballés Baena (Spain) P Riba	3	3
4	(Slovakia) A Martin (Slovakia) I Zelenay	6	6
(Republic of Ireland) J Cluskey (Lithuania) L Grigelis	7	4	[7]
WC	(Italy) S Caruso (Italy) Erik Crepaldi	5	6	[10]
(Poland) T Bednarek (United Kingdom) N Skupski	2	6	[7]
2	(Germany) G Kretschmer (Germany) A Satschko	6	3	[10]

Quarterfinals
(Italy) F Cipolla (Spain) D Muñoz de la Nava	7	3	[12]
(United States) J Cerretani (Romania) C Pavăl	5	6	[10]
3	(Croatia) D Marcan (Croatia) A Šančić	7^{8}	6^{6}	[10]
WC	(Italy) A Virgili (Italy) M Volante	6^{6}	7^{8}	[7]
(Uruguay) A Behar (Spain) E López-Pérez	6	7^{8}
4	(Slovakia) A Martin (Slovakia) I Zelenay	1	6^{6}
WC	(Italy) S Caruso (Italy) E Crepaldi	6^{2}	6	[6]
2	(Germany) G Kretschmer (Germany) A Satschko	7^{7}	4	[10]

Semifinals
(Italy) F Cipolla (Spain) D Muñoz de la Nava	5	6	[10]
3	(Croatia) D Marcan (Croatia) A Šančić	7	3	[8]
(Uruguay) A Behar (Spain) E López-Pérez	3	6^{2}
2	(Germany) G Kretschmer (Germany) A Satschko	6	7^{7}

Final
(Italy) F Cipolla (Spain) D Muñoz de la Nava	7^{7}	3	[11]
2	(Germany) G Kretschmer (Germany) A Satschko	6^{5}	6	[9]
