= Aimo =

Aimo or AIMO can refer to:

- Saint Aimo, French monk
- Aimo (name)
- Aircraft Integrated Maintenance Operations, U.S. agency
- Artificial Intelligence Mathematical Olympiad
- Asia International Mathematics Olympiad; see List of mathematics competitions
