= Aimo (name) =

Aimo can be a masculine given name, a middle name, or a surname. Notable people with the name include:

== Given name ==
- Aimo Aaltonen, Finnish construction worker and politician
- Aimo Aho (1951–2014), Finnish javelin thrower
- Aimo Cajander (1879–1943), former prime minister of Finland
- Aimo Diana (born 1978), Italian football manager and former footballer
- Aimo Heilmann (born 1974), German freestyle swimmer
- Aimo Jokinen (1931–2014), Finnish cyclist
- Aimo Koivunen (1917–1989), Finnish soldier
- Aimo Lahti (1896–1970), Finnish weapons designer
- Aimo Laiho, Finnish parliamentarian
- Aimo Mäenpää (1937–2018), Finnish wrestler
- Aimo Maggi, Italian painter
- Aimo Moroni (1934–2025), Italian chef
- Aimo Nieminen (1940–2018), Finnish weightlifter
- Aimo Pagin, French pianist
- Aimo Pulkkinen (1928–2018), Finnish footballer
- Aimo Sommarberg (footballer) (1931–2022), Finnish football defender
- Aimo Tepsell (1932–2017), Finnish orienteer
- Aimo Tukiainen (1917–1996), Finnish sculptor
- Aimo Vartiainen (1947–2023), Finnish alpine skier

== Middle name ==
- Tapani Aimo Vuorenhela (born 1947), Finnish former racing cyclist

== Surname ==
- Angelo Aimo (born 1964), Italian former football midfielder
- Bartolomeo Aimo (1889–1970), Italian road bicycle racer
- Tony Aimo (born 1960), Papua New Guinean politician
