= 2016 Antonio Savoldi–Marco Cò – Trofeo Dimmidisì =

- Date: 22–28 August
- Edition: 15th
- Location: Manerbio, Italy

Champions

Singles
- (Argentina) Leonardo Mayer

Doubles
- (Croatia) Nikola Mektić / (Croatia) Antonio Šančić
← 2015 ·	Antonio Savoldi–Marco Cò – Trofeo Dimmidisì	· 2017 →

The 2016 Antonio Savoldi–Marco Cò – Trofeo Dimmidisì was a professional tennis tournament played on clay courts. It was the fifteenth edition of the tournament which is part of the 2016 ATP Challenger Tour. It took place in Manerbio, Italy between 22 and 28 August 2016.

== ATP entrants ==
=== Seeds ===
Country	Player	Rank^{1}	Seed
AUT	Gerald Melzer	89	1
JPN	Taro Daniel	120	2
SVK	Andrej Martin	121	3
ESP	Daniel Gimeno Traver	126	4
ARG	Leonardo Mayer	130	5
ITA	Marco Cecchinato	140	6
SWE	Elias Ymer	148	7
SRB	Filip Krajinović	153	8

- ^{1} Rankings are as of August 15, 2016.

=== Other entrants ===
The following players received wildcards into the singles main draw:

- (Italy) Andrea Pellegrino
- (Italy) Edoardo Eremin
- (Italy) Lorenzo Sonego
- (Greece) Stefanos Tsitsipas

The following player received entry into the singles main draw as a special exempt :

- (Germany) Maximilian Marterer

The following player received entry into the singles main draw with a protected ranking:

- (Brazil) Fabiano de Paula

The following player received entry as an alternate:

- (Argentina) Pedro Cachin

The following players received entry from the qualifying draw:

- (France) Jonathan Eysseric
- (Lithuania) Laurynas Grigelis
- (Croatia) Nikola Mektić
- (Italy) Walter Trusendi

== Champions ==
=== Singles ===
- (Argentina) Leonardo Mayer def. (Serbia) Filip Krajinović, 7–6^{(7-3)}, 7–5.

=== Doubles ===
- (Croatia) Nikola Mektić / (Croatia) Antonio Šančić def. (Argentina) Juan Ignacio Galarza / (Argentina) Leonardo Mayer, 7–5, 6–1.
