= 2015 Antonio Savoldi–Marco Cò – Trofeo Dimmidisì =

- Date: 24–30 August
- Edition: 14th
- Location: Manerbio, Italy

Champions

Singles
- (Russia) Andrey Kuznetsov

Doubles
- (Italy) Flavio Cipolla / (Spain) Daniel Muñoz de la Nava
← 2011 ·	Antonio Savoldi–Marco Cò – Trofeo Dimmidisì	· 2016 →

The 2015 Antonio Savoldi–Marco Cò – Trofeo Dimmidisì was a professional tennis tournament played on clay courts. It was the fourteenth edition of the tournament which is part of the 2015 ATP Challenger Tour. It took place in Manerbio, Italy between 24 and 30 August 2015.

== ATP entrants ==
=== Seeds ===
Country	Player	Rank^{1}	Seed
ESP	Daniel Muñoz de la Nava	104	1
RUS	Andrey Kuznetsov	116	2
FRA	Kenny de Schepper	145	3
ARG	Carlos Berlocq	151	4
SVK	Andrej Martin	158	5
CHI	Hans Podlipnik	163	6
ESP	Roberto Carballés Baena	168	7
ITA	Filippo Volandri	210	8

- ^{1} Rankings are as of August 17, 2015.

=== Other entrants ===
The following players received wildcards into the singles main draw:

- (Italy) Erik Crepaldi
- (Italy) Federico Gaio
- (Italy) Riccardo Sinicropi
- (Italy) Lorenzo Sonego

The following players received entry as a special exempt into the singles main draw:

- (Spain) Pere Riba

The following players received entry from the qualifying draw:

- (Chile) Cristian Garín
- (Italy) Lorenzo Giustino
- (Portugal) Frederico Ferreira Silva
- (Slovenia) Grega Žemlja

== Champions ==
=== Singles ===
(Russia) Andrey Kuznetsov def. (Spain) Daniel Muñoz de la Nava, 6–4, 3–6, 6–1

=== Doubles ===
(Italy) Flavio Cipolla / (Spain) Daniel Muñoz de la Nava def. (Germany) Gero Kretschmer / (Germany) Alexander Satschko, 7–6^{(7–5)}, 3–6, [11–9]
