= Angelo Aimo =

Italian footballer (born 1964)

Personal information
- Date of birth: 17 November 1964 (age 61)
- Place of birth: Manerbio, Italy
- Height: 1.78 m (5 ft 10 in)
- Position: Midfielder

Senior career*
Years	Team	Apps	(Gls)
1982–1984	Perugia	15	(0)
1984–1985	Fano	29	(2)
1985–1986	Ospitaletto	28	(7)
1986–1988	Treviso	59	(7)
1988–1989	Modena	34	(4)
1989–1990	Prato	28	(1)
1990–1992	Cosenza	60	(6)
1992–1993	Como	19	(1)
1993–1994	Viareggio	18	(3)
1994–1995	Ponsacco	25	(3)
- * Club domestic league appearances and goals as of 21 February 2015

Angelo Aimo (born 17 November 1964) is an Italian former footballer. He played as midfielder.
