= 2009 Antonio Savoldi–Marco Cò – Trofeo Dimmidisì =

- Date: August 24 – August 30
- Edition: 11th
- Location: Manerbio, Italy

Champions

Singles
- (Argentina) Federico del Bonis

Doubles
- (Italy) Alessio di Mauro / (Italy) Simone Vagnozzi
← 2008 ·	Antonio Savoldi–Marco Cò – Trofeo Dimmidisì	· 2010 →

The 2009 Antonio Savoldi–Marco Cò – Trofeo Dimmidisì was a professional tennis tournament played on outdoor red clay courts. It was the eleventh edition of the tournament which was part of the 2009 ATP Challenger Tour. It took place in Manerbio, Italy between 24 and 30 August 2009.

== ATP entrants ==
=== Seeds ===
Nationality	Player	Ranking*	Seeding
ESP	Pere Riba	152	1
CZE	Jan Hájek	153	2
ITA	Tomas Tenconi	155	3
CZE	Jiří Vaněk	166	4
ARG	Eduardo Schwank	170	5
ITA	Alessio di Mauro	177	6
UKR	Oleksandr Dolgopolov Jr.	195	7
CRO	Antonio Veić	221	8

- Rankings are as of August 17, 2009.

=== Other entrants ===
The following players received wildcards into the singles main draw:

- (Italy) Daniele Giorgini
- (Lithuania) Laurynas Grigelis
- (Serbia) Filip Tomanić
- (Italy) Matteo Trevisan

The following players received wildcards into the singles main draw:

- (Spain) Pedro Clar-Rosselló
- (Austria) Philipp Oswald

The following players received entry from the qualifying draw:

- (Argentina) Carlos Berlocq
- (Argentina) Federico del Bonis
- (Italy) Stefano Ianni
- (Portugal) Leonardo Tavares

== Champions ==
=== Singles ===
(Argentina) Federico del Bonis def. (Portugal) Leonardo Tavares, 6–1, 6–3

=== Doubles ===
(Italy) Alessio di Mauro / (Italy) Simone Vagnozzi def. (Switzerland) Yves Allegro / (Netherlands) Jesse Huta Galung, 6–4, 3–6, [10–4]
