= 2010 Antonio Savoldi–Marco Cò – Trofeo Dimmidisì =

- Date: August 23 – August 29
- Edition: 12th
- Location: Manerbio, Italy

Champions

Singles
- (Netherlands) Robin Haase

Doubles
- (Netherlands) Robin Haase / (Netherlands) Thomas Schoorel
← 2009 ·	Antonio Savoldi–Marco Cò – Trofeo Dimmidisì	· 2011 →

The 2010 Antonio Savoldi–Marco Cò – Trofeo Dimmidisì was a professional tennis tournament played on outdoor clay courts. It was the twelfth edition of the tournament which is part of the 2010 ATP Challenger Tour. It took place in Manerbio, Italy between 23 and 29 August 2010.

== ATP entrants ==
=== Seeds ===
Nationality	Player	Ranking*	Seeding
ITA	Filippo Volandri	94	1
NED	Robin Haase	99	2
BEL	Steve Darcis	110	3
AUT	Daniel Köllerer	134	4
NED	Jesse Huta Galung	149	5
BEL	Christophe Rochus	179	6
FRA	Laurent Recouderc	182	7
ARG	Diego Junqueira	185	8

- Rankings are as of August 16, 2010.

=== Other entrants ===
The following players received wildcards into the singles main draw:

- (Italy) Francesco Aldi
- (Italy) Alberto Brizzi
- (Italy) Matteo Trevisan
- (Italy) Filippo Volandri

The following players received entry from the qualifying draw:

- (Italy) Marco Crugnola
- (Chile) Adrián García
- (Germany) Marc Sieber
- (Germany) Marcel Zimmermann

== Champions ==
=== Singles ===
(Netherlands) Robin Haase def. (Italy) Marco Crugnola, 6–3, 6–2.

=== Doubles ===
(Netherlands) Robin Haase / (Netherlands) Thomas Schoorel vs (Argentina) Diego Junqueira / (Spain) Gabriel Trujillo-Soler, 6–4, 6–4
