= 2011 Antonio Savoldi–Marco Cò – Trofeo Dimmidisì =

- Date: 22–28 August
- Edition: 13th
- Location: Manerbio, Italy

Champions

Singles
- (Romania) Adrian Ungur

Doubles
- (Germany) Dustin Brown / (Croatia) Lovro Zovko
← 2010 ·	Antonio Savoldi–Marco Cò – Trofeo Dimmidisì	· 2015 →

The 2011 Antonio Savoldi–Marco Cò – Trofeo Dimmidisì was a professional tennis tournament played on clay courts. It was the thirteenth edition of the tournament which is part of the 2011 ATP Challenger Tour. It took place in Manerbio, Italy between 22 and 28 August 2011.

== ATP entrants ==
=== Seeds ===
Country	Player	Rank^{1}	Seed
FRA	Stéphane Robert	108	1
NED	Thiemo de Bakker	117	2
SVK	Martin Kližan	119	3
GER	Dustin Brown	124	4
CZE	Jaroslav Pospíšil	127	5
FRA	Florent Serra	132	6
ITA	Simone Bolelli	136	7
ESP	Rubén Ramírez Hidalgo	137	8

- ^{1} Rankings are as of August 15, 2011.

=== Other entrants ===
The following players received wildcards into the singles main draw:

- (Argentina) Federico Delbonis
- (Kazakhstan) Evgeny Korolev
- (Austria) Thomas Muster
- (Italy) Matteo Trevisan

The following players received entry as a special exempt into the singles main draw:

- (Argentina) Nicolás Pastor

The following players received entry from the qualifying draw:

- (Germany) Peter Gojowczyk
- (Switzerland) Michael Lammer
- (Serbia) Boris Pašanski
- (Italy) Walter Trusendi

== Champions ==
=== Singles ===
(Romania) Adrian Ungur def. (Germany) Peter Gojowczyk, 4–6, 7–6(7–4), 6–2

=== Doubles ===
(Germany) Dustin Brown / (Croatia) Lovro Zovko def. (Italy) Alessio di Mauro / (Italy) Alessandro Motti, 7–6^{(7–4)}, 7–5
