= Robin Haase =

Dutch tennis player (born 1987)

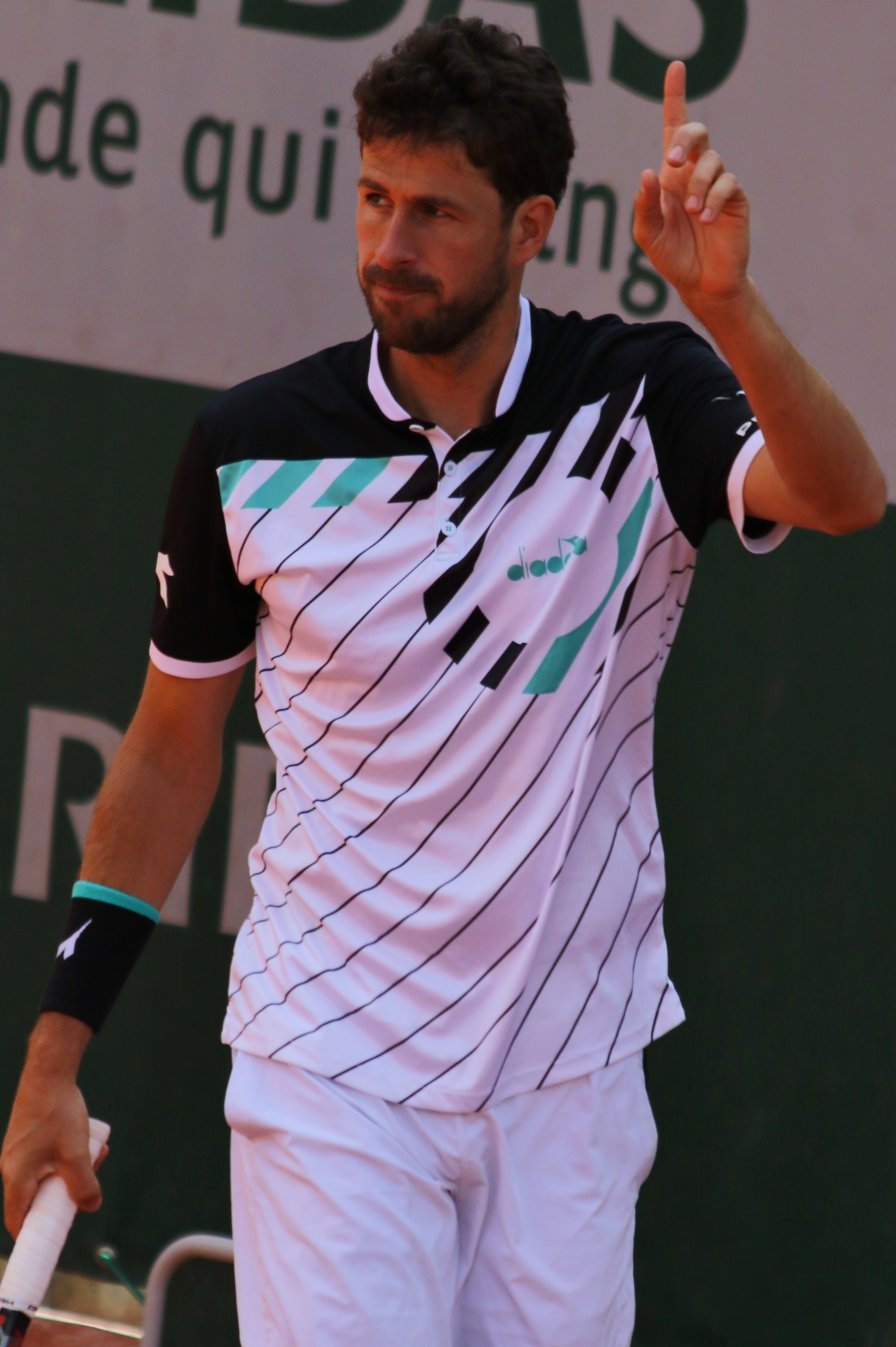
- Haase at the 2019 French Open
- Country (sports): Netherlands
- Residence: The Hague, Netherlands
- Born: 6 April 1987 (age 39) The Hague, Netherlands
- Height: 1.91 m (6 ft 3 in)
- Turned pro: 2005
- Retired: 2024 (singles)
- Plays: Right-handed (two-handed backhand)
- Coach: Raymond Knaap
- Prize money: $8,657,212

Singles
- Career record: 234–273
- Career titles: 2
- Highest ranking: No. 33 (30 July 2012)

Grand Slam singles results
- Australian Open: 3R (2011)
- French Open: 2R (2011, 2012, 2013, 2014, 2017)
- Wimbledon: 3R (2011)
- US Open: 2R (2011, 2015, 2018)

Other tournaments
- Olympic Games: 1R (2012, 2016, 2024)

Doubles
- Career record: 246–260
- Career titles: 10
- Highest ranking: No. 29 (22 May 2023)
- Current ranking: No. 30 (24 August 2026)

Grand Slam doubles results
- Australian Open: F (2013)
- French Open: 3R (2014, 2019, 2021)
- Wimbledon: QF (2018)
- US Open: QF (2017, 2025)

Other doubles tournaments
- Olympic Games: 2R (2024)

Grand Slam mixed doubles results
- Australian Open: 1R (2023)
- Wimbledon: 3R (2018)
- Last updated on: 23 August 2026.

Robin Haase (Dutch pronunciation: [ˈrɔbɪn ˈɦaːzə]; born 6 April 1987) is a Dutch professional tennis player. He reached his career-high ATP singles ranking of world No. 33 in July 2012 and his highest doubles ranking of No. 29 in May 2023.

In doubles, he has won ten titles on the ATP Tour, most notably the 2022 Rotterdam Open with Matwé Middelkoop. Haase reached the final of the 2013 Australian Open in doubles alongside compatriot Igor Sijsling, and has also reached four doubles finals at Masters 1000 level. He has represented the Netherlands in the Davis Cup since 2006, and also competed at the 2012 and 2016 Olympic Games. In singles, he has won two titles, at the Austrian Open in 2011 and 2012. He also reached the semifinals of the 2017 Canadian Open, and his best Grand Slam singles result was reaching the third round at the Australian Open and Wimbledon Championships in 2011.

== Career ==
=== 2005: Juniors ===
Haase was a promising junior player, compiling a singles win–loss record of 76–41 and reaching as high as No. 3 in the junior world rankings in March 2005. Later in 2005, he lost in the final of Junior Wimbledon to Jérémy Chardy in his last junior-level tournament.

=== 2006: ATP and Davis Cup debut, First Challenger title ===
Haase started 2006 ranked No. 665. In June, he played his first ATP tournament at Rosmalen, losing in the first round against Juan Carlos Ferrero.

In September, he made his debut for the Dutch Davis Cup team in the World Group play-offs against the Czech Republic, losing against Tomáš Berdych in straight sets and winning over Jan Hernych after the competition already was decided.

In November, Haase won his first Challenger tournament in Nashville, beating two top-100 players in the process.

In December, he won his first Dutch Masters title by beating defending champion Raemon Sluiter in the finals of the 2006 Sky Radio Tennis Masters.

Haase further reached three semifinals on the ATP Challenger Tour and ended the year ranked No. 164.

=== 2007: First Top-10 win, Grand Slam debut ===
In March, he won his second Challenger in Wolfsburg.

In July, Haase reached his first ATP Tour semifinal at the Dutch Open in Amersfoort, where in the quarterfinals. he beat a top-100 player Florent Serra. He eventually lost in straight sets to Werner Eschauer. Capping off a good week, he reached the final in doubles with compatriot Rogier Wassen, but lost in straight sets.

In August, Haase for the first time defeated a top-10 player at the Rogers Cup, beating Tomáš Berdych.

Haase made his Grand Slam debut at the US Open as a lucky loser, due to the withdrawal of Mario Ančić. He lost in the first round in straight sets to the third seed and eventual runner-up, Novak Djokovic.

=== 2008–2010: Australian and Wimbledon first wins ===
At the 2008 Chennai Open, Haase claimed another top-20 win when he defeated the second-seeded Marcos Baghdatis in the first round.

Haase pushed Lleyton Hewitt to five sets in the first round of Wimbledon 2008, with Hewitt finally winning.

Using protected ranking, Haase returned to Wimbledon two years later, where he upset James Blake in straight sets in the first round. He was narrowly defeated by world No. 1 and eventual champion, Rafael Nadal, in the second round in five sets.

=== 2011: First ATP title, top 50 year-end ranking ===
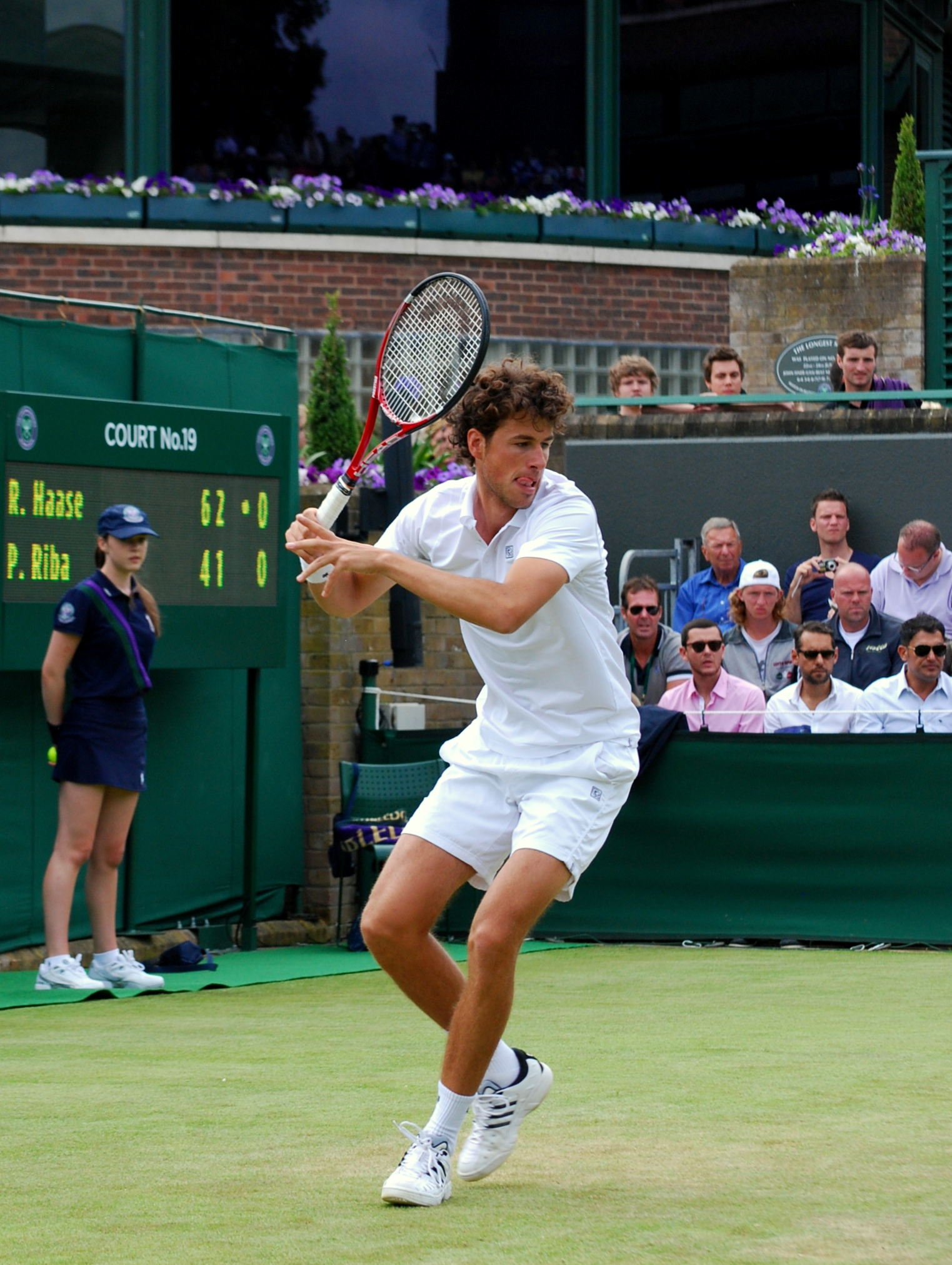
Robin Haase at the 2011 Wimbledon Championships

At Wimbledon, Haase beat world No. 22, Fernando Verdasco, in the second round in four sets. In the third round, he trailed against Mardy Fish, before retiring with a knee problem.

Haase then landed his first ATP title at the Austrian Open in Kitzbühel. In the opening round, he led Potito Starace, 6–3, 2–0, before his opponent retired due to injury. In the second round, he defeated second seed Feliciano López in a rain-delayed match that spanned two days. Hours later on the same day, he beat Andreas Seppi in the quarterfinals. In the semifinals, he defeated qualifier João Souza. In the final, he came out on top against experienced clay-courter Albert Montañés.

At the US Open, Haase reached the second round after beating Portuguese Rui Machado in straight sets. In the second round, Haase led fourth seed Andy Murray by two sets to love, but was eventually beaten in five sets, despite coming back from 4–0 to 4–4 in the deciding set.

Haase ended the year ranked No. 45, his highest end-of-year ranking in his professional career.

=== 2012–14: Australian Open doubles final, top 40 career-high in singles ===
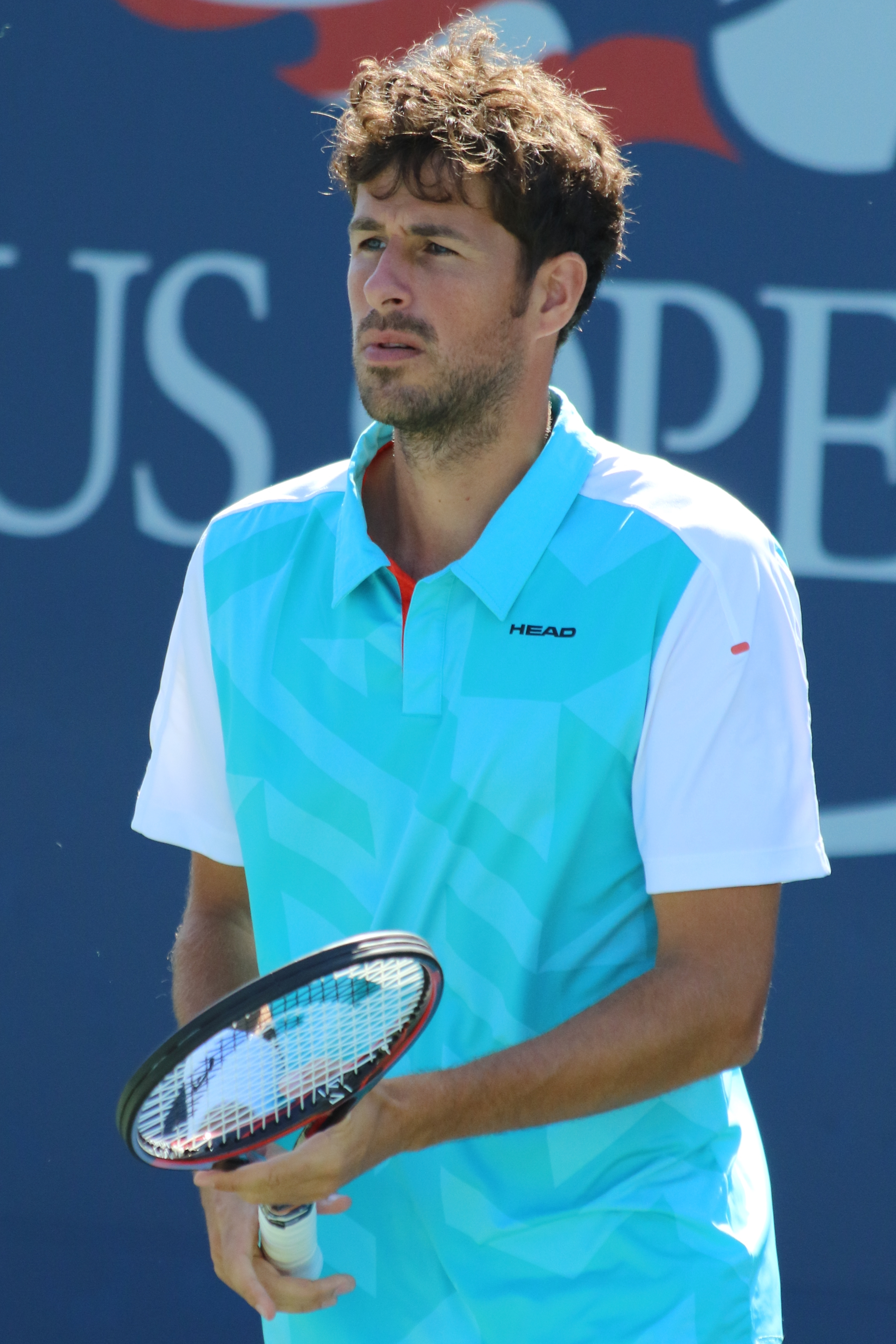
Haase at the 2016 US Open

Robin Haase meant to start the year playing in Chennai, but because of troubles obtaining a visa, he had to withdraw. In Australia, he lost first-round matches in Sydney and Melbourne, losing first to Alex Bogomolov Jr. and then to Andy Roddick. At the indoor tournament of Zagreb, Haase was seeded seventh and reached the quarterfinals, losing to Lukáš Lacko.

In February, he helped the Dutch Davis Cup team to a 5–0 victory over Finland in World Group I, playing a singles match and partnering in the doubles with Jean-Julien Rojer. In Rotterdam and Indian Wells, Haase lost again in the first round, this time to Nikolay Davydenko and Pablo Andújar.

In a Challenger tournament in Dallas, Hasse reached the quarterfinals. In the Miami Masters, he lost in the second round to Jürgen Melzer after winning against Marinko Matosevic.

In the second round of World Group I, the Netherlands won 5–0 against the Romanian team. Haase played two singles matches. In Casablanca, Haase was seeded sixth, but lost in the first round to Algerian Lamine Ouahab, ranked No. 752.

In the next week, Haase played the 2012 Monte-Carlo Masters. In the first round, his opponent Juan Mónaco retired in the third set. In the second round, Haase faced Fabio Fognini, defeating him in straight sets. In the third round facing Brazilian Thomaz Bellucci, who defeated fifth seed, David Ferrer in the previous round, Haase won in straight sets. In the quarterfinals, playing top seed, Novak Djokovic, who defeated him in straight sets, despite Haase breaking his serve four times. Robin Haase was the first Dutch player in nine years to reach a Masters Tournament quarterfinals, the last being Martin Verkerk. Haase then won the tournament in Kitzbühel for the second year in a row, beating Philipp Kohlschreiber. He then lost in the first round of the 2012 London Olympics in both singles and doubles.

In 2013, Robin Haase partnering with fellow Dutch Igor Sijsling reached the finals of the 2013 Australian Open where they lost to the Bryan brothers.

Haase finished the year 2013 ranked at World No. 43 in singles, his best career year ending thus far, and World No. 56 in doubles.

=== 2017–18: Two Major doubles quarters, Masters semis & two Top 50 singles year-ends ===
Haase reached the quarterfinals in doubles at the 2017 US Open (tennis) with Matwé Middelkoop and at the 2018 Wimbledon Championships with Robert Lindstedt.

Haase made it to the 2017 singles semifinals of the Canadian Open, his best showing at Masters 1000 level in his career, and also to the singles quarterfinals of the 2018 Canadian Open.

=== 2019–22: Two Masters finals & ATP 500 title & Top 30 in doubles ===
Haase partnering Wesley Koolhof made the finals of two Masters 1000 at the 2019 Monte-Carlo Masters and at the Canadian Open. As a result, he reached a career-high in doubles of No. 30 on 20 May 2019.

He reached also two ATP 500 doubles finals at the 2019 Hamburg European Open with Koolhof and at the 2022 ABN AMRO World Tennis Tournament with Matwé Middelkoop, winning the latter. He also reached the semifinals in doubles with Middelkoop at the 2022 Libéma Open.

At the 2022 Swiss Open Gstaad he reached the final in doubles with Philipp Oswald, where they lost to Tomislav Brkić and Francisco Cabral. He reached also with Oswald the semifinals at the 2022 Generali Open Kitzbühel where they lost to Lorenzo Sonego and Pedro Martínez and the third round at the US Open.

His singles ranking dropped out of the top 300 on 10 October 2022 but following a semifinal showing at the Challenger in Hamburg, where he lost to Henri Laaksonen, he climbed 35 positions back to No. 257 in the rankings on 24 October 2022.

=== 2023: First ATP singles win in two years, 20th final & 8th doubles title ===
He entered the 2023 Adelaide International 2 as a lucky loser replacing Maxime Cressy in the last minute after being an alternate in qualifying, and won his first singles match since February 2021 against Benjamin Bonzi in three tight sets 3–6, 7–6(8), 7–6(3). As a result, he climbed more than 20 positions in the rankings back into the top 250 at No. 235.

At the 2023 Open Sud de France he reached his twentieth doubles final partnering compatriot Middelkoop. He won his eight title defeating Maxime Cressy / Albano Olivetti.

== Style of play ==
Haase has a powerful serve, which often exceeds 200 km/h. It is also very accurate. Although his double-handed backhand is weaker than his forehand, he can attack and defend with both. When he hits the ball very flat, he is a threat to top players, as he led Nadal by two sets to one in Wimbledon before losing in 5 sets, and holding a two sets to love lead against three time Grand Slam champion Andy Murray in the US Open before eventually losing in five sets. He is capable of producing spectacular shots, such as powerful forehands down the line on the run, à la Sampras, or backhand winners while taking the ball on the rise, his left foot in the air. An accomplished doubles player, Haase does not shun the odd net point. Haase is a very spirited player, who has problems maintaining his temper when a match turns for the worse. Haase is left-handed but plays right-handed.

== Performance timelines ==
Key
W	F	SF	QF	#R	RR	Q#	P#	DNQ	A	Z#	PO	G	S	B	NMS	NTI	P	NH

(W) winner; (F) finalist; (SF) semifinalist; (QF) quarterfinalist; (#R) rounds 4, 3, 2, 1; (RR) round-robin stage; (Q#) qualification round; (P#) preliminary round; (DNQ) did not qualify; (A) absent; (Z#) Davis/Fed Cup Zonal Group (with number indication) or (PO) play-off; (G) gold, (S) silver or (B) bronze Olympic/Paralympic medal; (NMS) not a Masters tournament; (NTI) not a Tier I tournament; (P) postponed; (NH) not held; (SR) strike rate (events won / competed); (W–L) win–loss record.
To avoid confusion and double counting, these charts are updated at the conclusion of a tournament or when the player's participation has ended.

=== Singles ===
Tournament	2005	2006	2007	2008	2009	2010	2011	2012	2013	2014	2015	2016	2017	2018	2019	2020	2021	2022	2023	2024	SR	W–L
Grand Slam tournaments
Australian Open	A	A	Q1	2R	A	1R	3R	1R	1R	1R	1R	1R	1R	1R	2R	A	1R	Q2	A	A	0 / 12	4–12
French Open	A	A	Q2	1R	A	1R	2R	2R	2R	2R	1R	1R	2R	1R	1R	Q2	Q1	A	A	A	0 / 11	5–11
Wimbledon	A	A	A	1R	A	2R	3R	1R	1R	2R	2R	2R	1R	2R	2R	NH	Q2	A	A	A	0 / 11	8–11
US Open	A	A	1R	A	A	A	2R	1R	1R	1R	2R	1R	1R	2R	1R	A	Q2	A	A	A	0 / 10	3–10
Win–loss	0–0	0–0	0–1	1–3	0–0	1–3	6–4	1–4	1–4	2–4	2–4	1–4	1–4	2–4	2–4	0–0	0–1	0–0	0–0	0–0	0 / 44	20–44
National representation
Summer Olympics	not held			A	not held			1R	not held			1R	not held				A	not held		1R	0 / 3	0–3
Davis Cup	A	PO	Z1	PO	A	Z1	Z1	PO	PO	1R	PO	Z1	PO	1R	RR	QR	G1	QR	A	A	0 / 3	32–15
ATP Masters 1000
Indian Wells Open	A	A	A	2R	A	A	1R	1R	1R	2R	3R	2R	1R	A	2R	NH	A	A	A	A	0 / 9	6–9
Miami Open	A	A	1R	1R	A	A	1R	2R	1R	1R	2R	A	2R	2R	3R	NH	A	A	A	A	0 / 10	6–10
Monte-Carlo Masters	A	A	A	A	A	A	2R	QF	1R	1R	1R	1R	2R	1R	A	NH	A	A	A	A	0 / 8	5–8
Madrid Open	A	A	A	A	A	A	A	A	2R	1R	A	Q2	2R	2R	Q2	NH	A	A	A	A	0 / 4	3–4
Italian Open	A	A	A	A	A	A	A	1R	A	1R	A	Q2	1R	2R	Q1	A	A	A	A	A	0 / 4	1–4
Canadian Open	A	A	2R	A	A	A	A	A	A	A	A	A	SF	QF	Q1	NH	A	A	A	A	0 / 3	8–3
Cincinnati Open	A	A	A	A	A	A	A	1R	A	A	A	A	1R	3R	A	A	A	A	A	A	0 / 3	2–3
Shanghai Masters	NMS				A	A	1R	A	A	A	A	A	1R	1R	A	NH			A	A	0 / 3	0–3
Paris Masters	A	A	A	A	A	A	A	A	2R	A	Q1	1R	3R	1R	A	A	A	A	A	A	0 / 4	3–4
Win–loss	0–0	0–0	1–2	1–2	0–0	0–0	1–4	4–5	2–5	1–5	3–3	1–3	9–9	8–8	3–2	0–0	0–0	0–0	0–0	0–0	0 / 48	34–48
Career statistics
Titles	0	0	0	0	0	0	1	1	0	0	0	0	0	0	0	0	0	0	0	0	2	
Finals	0	0	0	0	0	0	1	1	2	0	0	1	0	0	0	0	0	0	0	0	5	
Overall win–loss	0–0	1–3	13–12	14–13	0–0	9–12	27–26	19–28	30–26	18–23	15–21	16–22	28–30	24–31	15–18	1–2	2–3	1–1	1–1	0–1	234–273	
Year-end ranking'	669	167	114	116	447	65	45	56	43	83	66	59	42	50	162	197	230	258	756	1202	46%	

=== Doubles ===
Current through the 2026 Barcelona Open.

Tournament	2005	2006	2007	2008	2009	2010	2011	2012	2013	2014	2015	2016	2017	2018	2019	2020	2021	2022	2023	2024	2025	2026	SR	W–L
Grand Slam tournaments
Australian Open	A	A	A	A	A	A	A	1R	F	2R	1R	2R	1R	1R	1R	A	1R	2R	3R	1R	1R	1R	0 / 14	10–13
French Open	A	A	A	2R	A	A	1R	1R	1R	3R	2R	1R	1R	2R	3R	1R	3R	2R	1R	2R	1R		0 / 16	11–16
Wimbledon	A	A	A	1R	A	2R	1R	1R	1R	1R	1R	A	1R	QF	3R	NH	3R	A	1R	1R	1R		0 / 14	8–14
US Open	A	A	1R	A	A	A	1R	1R	1R	2R	1R	2R	QF	3R	3R	A	1R	3R	2R	1R	QF		0 / 15	15–15
Win–loss	0–0	0–0	0–1	1–2	0–0	1–1	0–3	0–4	5–4	4–4	1–4	2–2	3–4	6–4	6–4	0–1	4–4	4–3	3–4	1–4	3–4	0–1	0 / 59	44–58
National representation
Summer Olympics	not held			A	not held			1R	not held			1R	not held				A	not held		2R	not held		0 / 3	1–3
Davis Cup	A	PO	Z1	PO	A	Z1	Z1	PO	PO	1R	PO	Z1	PO	1R	RR	QR	G1	QR	A	A	A		0 / 3	10–10
ATP Masters 1000
Indian Wells Open	A	A	A	A	A	A	A	A	1R	1R	A	A	A	A	A	NH	A	A	A	A	A	QF	0 / 3	2–3
Miami Open	A	A	A	A	A	A	A	A	A	2R	A	A	A	1R	1R	NH	A	A	2R	1R	A	1R	0 / 6	2–6
Monte-Carlo Masters	A	A	A	A	A	A	A	A	A	A	2R	A	A	A	F	NH	A	A	A	A	A	A	0 / 2	5–2
Madrid Open	A	A	A	A	A	A	A	A	A	A	A	A	2R	2R	2R	NH	A	A	A	1R	A		0 / 4	3–4
Italian Open	A	A	A	A	A	A	A	A	A	F	A	A	A	2R	A	A	A	A	F	1R	A		0 / 4	8–4
Canadian Open	A	A	A	A	A	A	A	A	A	A	A	A	A	1R	F	NH	A	A	1R	A	A		0 / 3	4–3
Cincinnati Open	A	A	A	A	A	A	A	2R	A	A	A	A	A	2R	1R	A	A	A	2R	A	A		0 / 4	3–3
Shanghai Masters	NMS				A	A	A	A	A	A	A	A	A	1R	A	NH			QF	A	1R		0 / 3	2–3
Paris Masters	A	A	A	A	A	A	A	A	A	A	A	A	A	1R	1R	A	A	A	A	A	A		0 / 2	0–2
Win–loss	0–0	0–0	0–0	0–0	0–0	0–0	0–0	1–0	0–1	5–3	1–1	0–0	1–1	3–7	9–6	0–0	0–0	0–0	7–5	0–3	0–1	2–2	0 / 31	29–30
Career statistics
Titles	0	0	0	0	0	0	1	0	0	1	0	0	0	3	1	0	0	1	1	0	2	0	10	
Finals	0	0	1	0	0	0	3	0	1	2	1	0	1	3	5	0	0	2	3	1	2	2	27	
Overall win–loss	0–1	0–2	3–4	4–7	0–0	2–5	16–12	10–16	9–14	17–16	12–16	7–12	18–18	30–23	30–21	2–3	5–8	15–10	29–28	16–26	19–16	12–11	256–269	
Year-end ranking	586	249	177	243	–	156	82	152	56	45	77	148	81	38	33	35	70	44	41	70	55		49%	

== Grand Slam tournaments finals ==
=== Doubles: 1 (runner-up) ===
Result	Year	Tournament	Surface	Partner	Opponents	Score
Loss	2013	Australian Open	Hard	(Netherlands) Igor Sijsling	(United States) Bob Bryan (United States) Mike Bryan	3–6, 4–6

== Other significant finals ==
=== ATP Masters 1000 ===
==== Doubles: 5 (5 runner-ups) ====
Result	Year	Tournament	Surface	Partner	Opponents	Score
Loss	2014	Italian Open	Clay	(Spain) Feliciano López	(Canada) Daniel Nestor (Serbia) Nenad Zimonjić	4–6, 6–7^{(2–7)}
Loss	2019	Monte-Carlo Masters	Clay	(Netherlands) Wesley Koolhof	(Croatia) Nikola Mektić (Croatia) Franko Škugor	7–6^{(7–3)}, 6–7^{(3–7)}, [9–11]
Loss	2019	Canadian Open	Hard	(Netherlands) Wesley Koolhof	(Spain) Marcel Granollers (Argentina) Horacio Zeballos	5–7, 5–7
Loss	2023	Italian Open	Clay	(Netherlands) Botic van de Zandschulp	(Monaco) Hugo Nys (Poland) Jan Zieliński	5–7, 1–6
Loss	2026	Cincinnati Open	Hard	(Germany) Constantin Frantzen	(Brazil) Orlando Luz (Brazil) Rafael Matos	4–6, 6–3, [7–10]

== ATP Tour finals ==
=== Singles: 5 (2 titles, 3 runner-ups) ===
Legend Grand Slam (–) ATP 1000 (–) ATP 500 (–) ATP 250 (2–3)	Finals by surface Hard (0–1) Clay (2–2) Grass (–)	Finals by setting Outdoor (2–2) Indoor (0–1)

Result	W–L	Date	Tournament	Tier	Surface	Opponent	Score
Win	1–0	Aug 2011	Austrian Open Kitzbühel, Austria	ATP 250	Clay	(Spain) Albert Montañés	6–4, 4–6, 6–1
Win	2–0	Jul 2012	Austrian Open Kitzbühel, Austria (2)	ATP 250	Clay	(Germany) Philipp Kohlschreiber	6–7^{(2–7)}, 6–3, 6–2
Loss	2–1	Jul 2013	Swiss Open Gstaad, Switzerland	ATP 250	Clay	(Russia) Mikhail Youzhny	3–6, 4–6
Loss	2–2	Oct 2013	Vienna Open, Austria	ATP 250	Hard (i)	(Germany) Tommy Haas	3–6, 6–4, 4–6
Loss	2–3	Jul 2016	Swiss Open Gstaad, Switzerland	ATP 250	Clay	(Spain) Feliciano López	4–6, 5–7

=== Doubles: 28 (10 titles, 18 runner-ups) ===
Legend Grand Slam (0–1) ATP 1000 (0–5) ATP 500 (1–3) International / ATP 250 (9–9)	Finals by surface Hard (7–8) Clay (3–8) Grass (0–2)	Finals by setting Outdoor (5–15) Indoor (5–3)

Result	W–L	Date	Tournament	Tier	Surface	Partner	Opponents	Score
Loss	0–1	Jul 2007	Dutch Open, Netherlands	International	Clay	(Netherlands) Rogier Wassen	(Argentina) Juan Pablo Brzezicki (Argentina) Juan Pablo Guzmán	2–6, 0–6
Loss	0–2	Jan 2011	Chennai Open, India	ATP 250	Hard	(United States) David Martin	(India) Mahesh Bhupathi (India) Leander Paes	2–6, 7–6^{(7–3)}, [7–10]
Win	1–2	Feb 2011	Open 13, France	ATP 250	Hard (i)	(United Kingdom) Ken Skupski	(France) Julien Benneteau (France) Jo-Wilfried Tsonga	6–4, 6–7^{(4–7)}, [13–11]
Loss	1–3	Jun 2011	Halle Open, Germany	ATP 250	Grass	(Canada) Milos Raonic	(India) Rohan Bopanna (Pakistan) Aisam-ul-Haq Qureshi	6–7^{(8–10)}, 6–3, [9–11]
Loss	1–4	Jan 2013	Australian Open, Australia	Grand Slam	Hard	(Netherlands) Igor Sijsling	(United States) Bob Bryan (United States) Mike Bryan	3–6, 4–6
Loss	1–5	May 2014	Italian Open, Italy	ATP 1000	Clay	(Spain) Feliciano López	(Canada) Daniel Nestor (Serbia) Nenad Zimonjić	4–6, 6–7^{(2–7)}
Win	2–5	Jul 2014	Swiss Open, Switzerland	ATP 250	Clay	(Germany) Andre Begemann	(Australia) Rameez Junaid (Slovakia) Michal Mertiňák	6–3, 6–4
Loss	2–6	Aug 2015	Austrian Open, Austria	ATP 250	Clay	(Finland) Henri Kontinen	(Spain) Nicolás Almagro (Argentina) Carlos Berlocq	7–5, 3–6, [9–11]
Loss	2–7	Feb 2017	Open 13, France	ATP 250	Hard (i)	(United Kingdom) Dominic Inglot	(France) Julien Benneteau (France) Nicolas Mahut	4–6, 7–6^{(11–9)}, [5–10]
Win	3–7	Jan 2018	Maharashtra Open, India	ATP 250	Hard	(Netherlands) Matwé Middelkoop	(France) Pierre-Hugues Herbert (France) Gilles Simon	7–6^{(7–5)}, 7–6^{(7–5)}
Win	4–7	Feb 2018	Sofia Open, Bulgaria	ATP 250	Hard (i)	(Netherlands) Matwé Middelkoop	(Croatia) Nikola Mektić (Austria) Alexander Peya	5–7, 6–4, [10–4]
Win	5–7	Jul 2018	Croatia Open, Croatia	ATP 250	Clay	(Netherlands) Matwé Middelkoop	(Czech Republic) Roman Jebavý (Czech Republic) Jiří Veselý	6–4, 6–4
Loss	5–8	Jan 2019	Qatar Open, Qatar	ATP 250	Hard	(Netherlands) Matwé Middelkoop	(Belgium) David Goffin (France) Pierre-Hugues Herbert	7–5, 4–6, [4–10]
Loss	5–9	Apr 2019	Monte-Carlo Masters, Monaco	ATP 1000	Clay	(Netherlands) Wesley Koolhof	(Croatia) Nikola Mektić (Croatia) Franko Škugor	7–6^{(7–3)}, 6–7^{(3–7)}, [9–11]
Win	6–9	Jul 2019	Croatia Open, Croatia (2)	ATP 250	Clay	(Austria) Philipp Oswald	(Austria) Oliver Marach (Austria) Jürgen Melzer	7–5, 6–7^{(2–7)}, [14–12]
Loss	6–10	Jul 2019	Hamburg Open, Germany	ATP 500	Clay	(Netherlands) Wesley Koolhof	(Austria) Oliver Marach (Austria) Jürgen Melzer	2–6, 6–7^{(3–7)}
Loss	6–11	Aug 2019	Canadian Open, Canada	ATP 1000	Hard	(Netherlands) Wesley Koolhof	(Spain) Marcel Granollers (Argentina) Horacio Zeballos	5–7, 5–7
Win	7–11	Feb 2022	Rotterdam Open, Netherlands	ATP 500	Hard (i)	(Netherlands) Matwé Middelkoop	(South Africa) Lloyd Harris (Germany) Tim Pütz	4–6, 7–6(7–5), [10–5]
Loss	7–12	Jul 2022	Swiss Open, Switzerland	ATP 250	Clay	(Austria) Philipp Oswald	(Bosnia and Herzegovina) Tomislav Brkić (Portugal) Francisco Cabral	4–6, 4–6
Win	8–12	Feb 2023	Open Sud de France, France	ATP 250	Hard (i)	(Netherlands) Matwé Middelkoop	(United States) Maxime Cressy (France) Albano Olivetti	7–6^{(7–4)}, 4–6, [10–6]
Loss	8–13	May 2023	Italian Open, Italy	ATP 1000	Clay	(Netherlands) Botic van de Zandschulp	(Monaco) Hugo Nys (Poland) Jan Zieliński	5–7, 1–6
Loss	8–14	Jun 2023	Mallorca Open, Spain	ATP 250	Grass	(Austria) Philipp Oswald	(India) Yuki Bhambri (South Africa) Lloyd Harris	3–6, 4–6
Loss	8–15	Feb 2024	Rotterdam Open, Netherlands	ATP 500	Hard (i)	(Netherlands) Botic van de Zandschulp	(Netherlands) Wesley Koolhof (Croatia) Nikola Mektić	3–6, 5–7
Win	9–15	Feb 2025	Open Occitanie, France (2)	ATP 250	Hard (i)	(Netherlands) Botic van de Zandschulp	(Netherlands) Tallon Griekspoor (Netherlands) Bart Stevens	6–7^{(7–9)}, 6–3, [10–5]
Win	10–15	Sep 2025	Chengdu Open, China	ATP 250	Hard	(Germany) Constantin Frantzen	(United States) Vasil Kirkov (Netherlands) Bart Stevens	4–6, 6–3, [10–7]
Loss	10–16	Feb 2026	Open Occitanie, France	ATP 250	Hard (i)	(Germany) Constantin Frantzen	(France) Théo Arribagé (France) Albano Olivetti	6–7^{(6–8)}, 1–6
Loss	10–17	Feb 2026	Rio Open, Brazil	ATP 500	Clay	(Germany) Constantin Frantzen	(Brazil) João Fonseca (Brazil) Marcelo Melo	6–4, 3–6, [8–10]
Loss	10–18	Aug 2026	Cincinnati Open, United States	ATP 1000	Hard	(Germany) Constantin Frantzen	(Brazil) Orlando Luz (Brazil) Rafael Matos	4–6, 6–3, [7–10]

== ATP Challenger Tour finals ==
=== Singles: 19 (13–6) ===
Finals by surface
Hard (3–1)
Clay (9–5)
Carpet (1–0)

Result	W–L	Date	Tournament	Surface	Opponent	Score
Win	1–0	Nov 2006	Nashville, United States	Hard (i)	(Denmark) Kristian Pless	7–6^{(11–9)}, 6–3
Win	2–0	Mar 2007	Wolfsburg, Germany	Carpet (i)	(Germany) Daniel Brands	6–2, 3–6, 6–1
Win	3–0	Mar 2008	Sunrise, United States	Hard	(France) Sébastien Grosjean	5–7, 7–5, 6–1
Win	4–0	Mar 2010	Caltanissetta, Italy	Clay	(Italy) Matteo Trevisan	7–5, 6–3
Win	5–0	Jun 2010	Fürth, Germany	Clay	(Germany) Tobias Kamke	6–4, 6–2
Win	6–0	Aug 2010	San Marino, San Marino	Clay	(Italy) Filippo Volandri	6–2, 7–6^{(10–8)}
Win	7–0	Aug 2010	Manerbio, Italy	Clay	(Italy) Marco Crugnola	6–3, 6–2
Win	8–0	Sep 2010	Como, Italy	Clay	(Czech Republic) Ivo Minář	6–4, 6–3
Loss	8–1	Jun 2013	Caltanissetta, Italy	Clay	(Serbia) Dušan Lajović	6–7^{(4–7)}, 3–6
Loss	8–2	Jul 2013	Scheveningen, Netherlands	Clay	(Netherlands) Jesse Huta Galung	3–6, 7–6^{(7–2)}, 4–6
Win	9–2	Nov 2014	Réunion Island, Réunion	Hard	(France) Florent Serra	3–6, 6–1, 7–5
Win	10–2	May 2015	Aix-en-Provence, France	Clay	(France) Paul-Henri Mathieu	7–6^{(7–1)}, 6–2
Win	11–2	Sep 2015	Trnava, Slovakia	Clay	(Argentina) Horacio Zeballos	6–4, 6–1
Win	12–2	Jul 2016	Scheveningen, Netherlands	Clay	(Czech Republic) Adam Pavlásek	6–4, 6–7^{(9–11)}, 6–2
Loss	12–3	Sep 2016	Alphen, Netherlands	Clay	(Germany) Jan-Lennard Struff	4–6, 1–6
Win	13–3	Sep 2016	Sibiu, Romania	Clay	(Italy) Lorenzo Giustino	7–6^{(7–2)}, 6–2
Loss	13–4	Oct 2016	Rome, Italy	Clay	(Czech Republic) Jan Šátral	3–6, 2–6
Loss	13–5	Jan 2020	Bangkok, Thailand	Hard	(Italy) Federico Gaio	1–6, 6–4, 2–4 ret.
Loss	13–6	May 2022	Shymkent, Kazakhstan	Clay	(Uzbekistan) Sergey Fomin	6–7^{(4–7)}, 3–6

=== Doubles: 25 (14–11) ===
Finals by surface
Hard (4–3)
Clay (10–8)

Result	W–L	Date	Tournament	Surface	Partner	Opponents	Score
Loss	0–1	Aug 2006	Saransk, Russia	Clay	(Israel) Dekel Valtzer	(Kazakhstan) Alexey Kedryuk (Ukraine) Orest Tereshchuk	4–6, 7–5, [5–10]
Loss	0–2	Sep 2006	Brașov, Romania	Clay	(Czech Republic) Michal Navrátil	(North Macedonia) Lazar Magdinčev (North Macedonia) Predrag Rusevski	4–6, 6–7^{(9–11)}
Win	1–2	Nov 2005	Louisville, United States	Hard (i)	(Netherlands) Igor Sijsling	(United States) Amer Delić (United States) Robert Kendrick	w/o
Loss	1–3	Jan 2007	Wrexham, United Kingdom	Hard (i)	(United Kingdom) Richard Bloomfield	(France) Thomas Oger (France) Nicolas Tourte	7–6^{(7–4)}, 5–7, [10–12]
Loss	1–4	Apr 2010	Athens, Greece	Hard	(Netherlands) Igor Sijsling	(South Africa) Rik de Voest (Chinese Taipei) Lu Yen-hsun	3–6, 4–6
Win	2–4	Aug 2010	Cordenons, Italy	Clay	(Netherlands) Rogier Wassen	(United States) James Cerretani (Canada) Adil Shamasdin	7–6^{(16–14)}, 7–5
Win	3–4	Aug 2010	Manerbio, Italy	Clay	(Netherlands) Thomas Schoorel	(Argentina) Diego Junqueira (Spain) Gabriel Trujillo Soler	6–4, 6–4
Loss	3–5	Sep 2014	Trnava, Slovakia	Clay	(Netherlands) Stephan Fransen	(Czech Republic) Roman Jebavý (Czech Republic) Jaroslav Pospíšil	4–6, 2–6
Win	4–5	Nov 2010	Réunion Island, Réunion	Hard	(Croatia) Mate Pavić	(France) Jonathan Eysseric (France) Fabrice Martin	7–5, 4–6 [10–7]
Win	5–5	May 2015	Aix-en-Provence, France	Clay	(Pakistan) Aisam Qureshi	(United States) Nicholas Monroe (New Zealand) Artem Sitak	6–1, 6–2
Win	6–5	May 2015	Bordeaux, France	Clay	(Netherlands) Thiemo de Bakker	(France) Lucas Pouille (Ukraine) Sergiy Stakhovsky	6–3, 7–5
Loss	6–6	Sep 2016	Alphen, Netherlands	Clay	(Netherlands) Boy Westerhof	(Germany) Daniel Masur (Germany) Jan-Lennard Struff	4–6, 1–6
Win	7–6	Sep 2016	Sibiu, Romania	Clay	(Germany) Tim Pütz	(France) Jonathan Eysseric (France) Tristan Lamasine	6–4, 6–2
Win	8–6	Apr 2019	Sophia Antipolis, France	Clay	(Netherlands) Thiemo de Bakker	(France) Enzo Couacaud (France) Tristan Lamasine	6–4, 6–4
Loss	8–7	Aug 2021	Meerbusch, Germany	Clay	(Germany) Dustin Brown	(Poland) Szymon Walków (Poland) Jan Zieliński	3–6, 1–6
Loss	8–8	Mar 2022	Saint-Brieuc, France	Hard (i)	(France) Jonathan Eysseric	(Netherlands) Sander Arends (Netherlands) David Pel	3-6, 3-6
Win	9–8	Jul 2022	Lüdenscheid, Germany	Clay	(Netherlands) Sem Verbeek	(Germany) Fabian Fallert (Germany) Hendrik Jebens	6–2, 5–7, [10–3]
Win	10–8	Jul 2022	Amersfoort, Netherlands	Clay	(Netherlands) Sem Verbeek	(Colombia) Nicolás Barrientos (Mexico) Miguel Ángel Reyes-Varela	6–4, 3–6, [10–7]
Win	11–8	Aug 2022	Grodzisk Mazowiecki, Poland	Hard	(Austria) Philipp Oswald	(Monaco) Hugo Nys (France) Fabien Reboul	6–3, 6–4
Win	12–8	Oct 2022	Alicante, Spain	Hard	(France) Albano Olivetti	(Uzbekistan) Sanjar Fayziev (Uzbekistan) Sergey Fomin	7–6^{(7–5)}, 7–5
Win	13–8	Jul 2024	Braunschweig, Germany	Clay	(Netherlands) Sander Arends	(India) Sriram Balaji (Ecuador) Gonzalo Escobar	4–6, 6–4, [10–8]
Loss	13–9	May 2025	Turin, Italy	Clay	(Germany) Hendrik Jebens	(Uruguay) Ariel Behar (Belgium) Joran Vliegen	2–6, 4–6
Loss	13–10	Jun 2025	Perugia, Italy	Clay	(United States) Vasil Kirkov	(Monaco) Romain Arneodo (France) Manuel Guinard	6–3, 3–6, [5–10]
Loss	13–11	Jul 2025	Trieste, Italy	Clay	(Denmark) Johannes Ingildsen	(Switzerland) Jakub Paul (Czech Republic) Matěj Vocel	5–7, 1–6
Win	14–11	May 2026	Valencia, Spain	Clay	(Germany) Constantin Frantzen	(Netherlands) Sander Arends (Netherlands) David Pel	6–4, 6–7^{(5–7)}, [11–9]

== ITF Futures finals ==
=== Singles: 5 (2–3) ===
Finals by surface
Hard (2–2)
Clay (0–1)

Result	W–L	Date	Tournament	Surface	Opponent	Score
Win	1–0	Nov 2005	Israel F1, Ashkelon	Hard	(Israel) Dekel Valtzer	6–1, 3–6, 6–2
Loss	1–1	Mar 2006	Canada F1, Laval	Hard (i)	(United States) Brian Wilson	6–4, 2–6, 4–6
Win	2–1	Mar 2006	Canada F2, Rock Forest	Hard (i)	(United States) Tyler Cleveland	6–4, 6–7^{(2–7)}, 6–3
Loss	2–2	Mar 2006	Canada F3, Montreal	Hard (i)	(United States) Nikita Kryvonos	6–4, 5–7, 3–6
Loss	2–3	Aug 2006	Netherlands F4, Vlaardingen	Clay	(Australia) Joseph Sirianni	4–6, 6–4, 3–6

=== Doubles: 4 (2–2) ===
Finals by surface
Hard (0–2)
Clay (2–0)

Result	W–L	Date	Tournament	Surface	Partner	Opponents	Score
Win	1–0	Aug 2005	Italy F24, L'Aquila	Clay	(Netherlands) Igor Sijsling	(Switzerland) Frédéric Nussbaum (Switzerland) Benjamin-David Rufer	6–4, 7–6^{(10–8)}
Loss	1–1	Nov 2005	Israel F1, Ashkelon	Hard	(Netherlands) Igor Sijsling	(Czech Republic) Roman Kutáč (Czech Republic) Michal Navrátil	6–7^{(2–7)}, 6–3, 2–6
Loss	1–2	Feb 2006	Croatia F2, Zagreb	Hard (i)	(Netherlands) Igor Sijsling	(Croatia) Petar Jelenić (Croatia) Vilim Višak	4–6, 6–4, 6–7^{(2–7)}
Win	2–2	Jul 2006	Netherlands F3, Heerhugowaard	Clay	(Belgium) Dominique Coene	(Germany) Martin Emmrich (Switzerland) Sven Swinnen	2–6, 6–3, 6–3

== Junior Grand Slam finals ==
=== Singles: 1 (runner-up) ===
Result	Year	Tournament	Surface	Opponent	Score
Loss	2005	Wimbledon	Grass	(France) Jérémy Chardy	4–6, 3–6

=== Doubles: 1 (runner-up) ===
Result	Year	Tournament	Surface	Partner	Opponents	Score
Loss	2004	Wimbledon	Grass	(Serbia) Viktor Troicki	(United States) Scott Oudsema (United States) Brendan Evans	4–6, 4–6

== Wins over top 10 players ==
- Haase's match record against players who were, at the time the match was played, ranked in the top 10.

Year	2005	2006	2007	2008	2009	2010	2011	2012	2013	2014	2015	2016	2017	2018	2019	2020	2021	Total
Wins	0	0	1	1	0	0	0	0	1	0	1	0	2	1	0	0	0	7

#	Player	Rank	Event	Surface	Rd	Score	RH Rank
2007
1.	(Czech Republic) Tomáš Berdych	10	Montreal, Canada	Hard	1R	6–4, 7–5	103
2008
2.	(United Kingdom) Andy Murray	10	Rotterdam, Netherlands	Hard (i)	1R	7–5, 6–3	94
2013
3.	(France) Jo-Wilfried Tsonga	8	Vienna, Austria	Hard (i)	SF	7–5, 7–6^{(7–4)}	63
2015
4.	(Switzerland) Stan Wawrinka	7	Indian Wells, United States	Hard	2R	6–3, 3–6, 6–3	104
2017
5.	(Austria) Dominic Thiem	8	Halle, Germany	Grass	2R	6–3, 7–6^{(9–7)}	42
6.	(Germany) Alexander Zverev	4	Paris, France	Hard (i)	2R	3–6, 6–2, 6–2	43
2018
7.	(Germany) Alexander Zverev	4	Cincinnati, United States	Hard	2R	5–7, 6–4, 7–5	55
