= Daniel Muñoz de la Nava =

Spanish tennis player (born 1982)

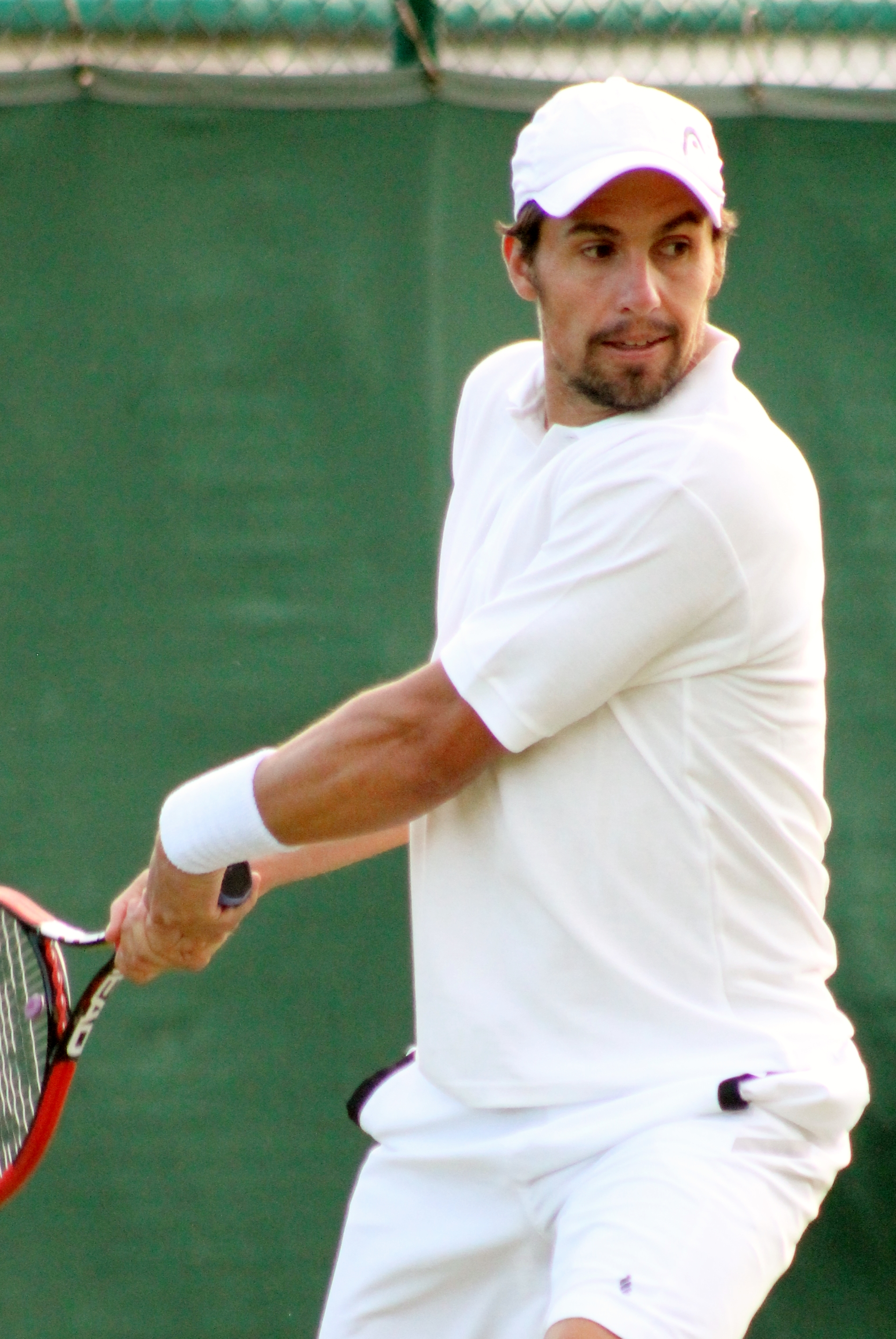
- Country (sports): Spain
- Residence: Madrid, Spain
- Born: 29 January 1982 (age 43) Madrid, Spain
- Height: 1.75 m (5 ft 9 in)
- Turned pro: 1999
- Retired: 2019
- Plays: Left-handed (two-handed backhand)
- Coach: Ignacio Truyol
- Prize money: US$1,104,595

Singles
- Career record: 9–28
- Career titles: 0
- Highest ranking: No. 68 (29 February 2016)

Grand Slam singles results
- Australian Open: 1R (2013, 2016)
- French Open: 1R (2012, 2013, 2016)
- Wimbledon: Q3 (2009, 2013)
- US Open: Q3 (2010)

Doubles
- Career record: 6–14
- Career titles: 0
- Highest ranking: No. 94 (16 May 2011)

Grand Slam doubles results
- Australian Open: 1R (2016)
- Last updated on: 15 February 2022.

Daniel Muñoz de la Nava (Spanish pronunciation: [daˈnjel muˈɲoθ ðe la ˈnaβa]; (Note: In isolation, de is pronounced [de].) born 29 January 1982 in Madrid, Spain) is a Spanish professional tennis player.

He reached the quarterfinals of Estoril in 2012 and Delray Beach in 2013, both as a qualifier.

== ATP career finals ==
=== Doubles: 1 (1 runner-up) ===
Legend Grand Slam Tournaments (0–0) ATP World Tour Finals (0–0) ATP Masters 1000 Series (0–0) ATP 500 Series (0–1) ATP 250 Series (0–0)	Finals by surface Hard (0–0) Clay (0–1) Grass (0–0) Carpet (0–0)	Finals by setting Outdoors (0–1) Indoors (0–0)

Result	W–L	Date	Tournament	Tier	Surface	Partner	Opponents	Score
Loss	0–1	Jul 2012	Hamburg, Germany	500 Series	Clay	(Brazil) Rogério Dutra da Silva	(Spain) David Marrero (Spain) Fernando Verdasco	4–6, 3–6

== ATP Challenger and ITF Futures finals ==
=== Singles: 34 (11–23) ===
Legend ATP Challenger (4–11) ITF Futures (7–12)	Finals by surface Hard (0–6) Clay (11–17) Grass (0–0) Carpet (0–0)

Result	W–L	Date	Tournament	Tier	Surface	Opponent	Score
Loss	0-1	Nov 2001	Barbados F1, Bridgetown	Futures	Hard	(Netherlands) Fred Hemmes	6–1, 5–7, 6–7^{(3–7)}
Loss	0-2	Jul 2003	Spain F15, Gandia	Futures	Clay	(Spain) Mario Munoz-Bejarano	3–6, 2–6
Loss	0-3	May 2004	Great Britain F2, Edinburgh	Futures	Clay	(France) Éric Prodon	4–6, 3–6
Loss	0-4	Jun 2004	Spain F10, La Palma	Futures	Hard	(Spain) Bartolomé Salvá Vidal	6–7^{(4–7)}, 6–2, 4–6
Loss	0-5	Jun 2004	Spain F11, Lanzarote	Futures	Hard	(France) Jo-Wilfried Tsonga	5–7, 3–6
Loss	0-6	Nov 2004	Spain F31, Gran Canaria	Futures	Clay	(Spain) Frank Condor-Fernandez	6–7^{(3–7)}, 6–3, 4–6
Win	1-6	Nov 2004	Spain F32, Gran Canaria	Futures	Clay	(Portugal) Rui Machado	5–7, 7–6^{(9–7)}, 7–6^{(4–7)}
Loss	1-7	Sep 2005	Spain F23, Madrid	Futures	Hard	(Denmark) Frederik Nielsen	4–6, 6–2, 6–7^{(4–7)}
Loss	1-8	Feb 2006	Colombia F2, Bucaramanga	Futures	Clay	(Uruguay) Marcel Felder	3–6, 4–6
Loss	1-9	Mar 2006	Portugal F2, Lagos	Futures	Hard	(Spain) Adrián Menéndez Maceiras	6–3, 4–6, 3–6
Win	2-9	May 2006	Spain F14, Lleida	Futures	Clay	(Spain) José Checa Calvo	6–3, 6–4
Win	3-9	May 2006	Spain F15, Balaguer	Futures	Clay	(Spain) Pablo Santos González	6–3, 3–6, 7–5
Loss	3-10	Feb 2007	France F3, Bressuire	Futures	Hard	(France) Thierry Ascione	2–6, 6–7^{(5–7)}
Win	4-10	Jun 2007	France F8, Blois	Futures	Clay	(Monaco) Jean-Rene Lisnard	7–5, 6–4
Loss	4-11	Aug 2008	Timişoara, Romania	Challenger	Clay	(Germany) Daniel Brands	4–6, 6–7^{(0–7)}
Loss	4-12	Apr 2009	Athens, Greece	Challenger	Clay	(Portugal) Rui Machado	3–6, 6–7^{(4–7)}
Win	5-12	Mar 2010	Spain F10, Zaragoza	Futures	Clay	(Spain) Pablo Carreño Busta	6–3, 6–4
Loss	5-13	Aug 2010	Cordenons, Italy	Challenger	Clay	(Belgium) Steve Darcis	2–6, 4–6
Win	6-13	Aug 2011	Cordenons, Italy	Challenger	Clay	(Argentina) Nicolás Pastor	6–4, 2–6, 6–2
Loss	6-14	Oct 2011	Quito, Ecuador	Challenger	Clay	(Argentina) Sebastián Decoud	3–6, 6–7^{(3–7)}
Loss	6-15	Nov 2012	Marbella, Spain	Challenger	Clay	(Spain) Albert Montañés	6–3, 2–6, 3–6
Loss	6-16	Jun 2014	Mohammedia, Morocco	Challenger	Clay	(Spain) Pablo Carreño Busta	6–7^{(2–7)}, 6–2, 2–6
Loss	6-17	Sep 2014	Alphen, Netherlands	Challenger	Clay	(Netherlands) Jesse Huta Galung	3–6, 4–6
Win	7-17	Apr 2015	Napoli, Italy	Challenger	Clay	(Italy) Matteo Donati	6–2, 6–1
Win	8-17	Jun 2015	Moscow, Russia	Challenger	Clay	(Moldova) Radu Albot	6–0, 6–1
Loss	8-18	Jun 2015	Blois, France	Challenger	Clay	(France) Mathias Bourgue	6–2, 4–6, 2–6
Loss	8-19	Aug 2015	Manerbio, Italy	Challenger	Clay	(Russia) Andrey Kuznetsov	4–6, 6–3, 1–6
Win	9-19	Sep 2015	Meknes, Morocco	Challenger	Clay	(Spain) Roberto Carballés Baena	6–4, 6–2
Loss	9-20	Oct 2015	Casablanca, Morocco	Challenger	Clay	(Bosnia and Herzegovina) Damir Džumhur	6–3, 3–6, 2–6
Loss	9-21	Feb 2017	Spain F5, Murcia	Futures	Clay	(Spain) Ricardo Ojeda Lara	7–6^{(7–3)}, 2–6, 6–7^{(3–7)}
Loss	9-22	Jul 2017	Perugia, Italy	Challenger	Clay	(Serbia) Laslo Djere	6–7^{(2–7)}, 4–6
Win	10-22	Sep 2017	Spain F29, Seville	Futures	Clay	(Argentina) Pedro Cachin	7–6^{(7–5)}, 6–2
Loss	10-23	Jan 2018	Spain F1, Mallorca	Futures	Clay	(Russia) Evgenii Tiurnev	4–6, 0–6
Win	11-23	Jan 2018	Spain F2, Mallorca	Futures	Clay	(Italy) Lorenzo Giustino	6–4, 5–7, 6–3

=== Doubles: 38 (23–15) ===
Legend ATP Challenger (16–9) ITF Futures (7–6)	Finals by surface Hard (4–4) Clay (19–11) Grass (0–0) Carpet (0–0)

Result	W–L	Date	Tournament	Tier	Surface	Partner	Opponents	Score
Win	1–0	Jul 2003	Spain F15, Gandia	Futures	Clay	(Spain) Jordi Marse-Vidri	(Egypt) Karim Maamoun (Portugal) Rui Machado	6–7^{(1–7)}, 7–6^{(8–6)}, 6–4
Win	2–0	Aug 2003	Spain F16, Dénia	Futures	Clay	(Spain) Jordi Marse-Vidri	(China) Zeng Shaoxuan (China) Zhu Ben-Qiang	3–6, 6–3, 6–3
Loss	2–1	Jun 2004	Spain F9, Tenerife	Futures	Hard	(Spain) Ivan Esquerdo-Andreu	(Spain) Javier Genaro-Martinez (Togo) Komlavi Loglo	4–6, 6–3, 1–6
Win	3–1	Jun 2004	Spain F10, La Palma	Futures	Hard	(Spain) Daniel Monedero-Gonzalez	(Spain) Jose-Pablo Serna-Perez (Spain) Juan-Miguel Such-Perez	walkover
Loss	3–2	Aug 2004	Segovia, Spain	Challenger	Hard	(Spain) Iván Navarro	(Russia) Igor Kunitsyn (Belarus) Vladimir Voltchkov	6–3, 3–6, 2–6
Loss	3–3	Oct 2004	France F19, La Roche-sur-Yon	Futures	Hard	(Slovakia) Igor Zelenay	(France) Xavier Audouy (France) Jean-François Bachelot	6–3, 1–6, 2–6
Win	4–3	Oct 2004	France F20, Rodez	Futures	Hard	(Italy) Alessandro Motti	(France) Gilles Simon (France) Cyril Spanelis	6–2, 6–2
Win	5–3	Nov 2004	Spain F31, Gran Canaria	Futures	Clay	(Spain) Carles Reixach Itoiz	(Spain) Antonio Baldellou-Esteva (Spain) Germán Puentes Alcañiz	6–3, 7–6^{(8–6)}
Loss	5–4	Jul 2005	Spain F15, Elche	Futures	Clay	(Spain) Pablo Santos González	(Spain) Pablo Andújar (Japan) Jun Kato	5–7, 1–4 ret.
Loss	5–5	Sep 2005	Spain F22, Oviedo	Futures	Clay	(Spain) Cesar Ferrer-Victoria	(Spain) Esteban Carril-Caso (Spain) Gabriel Trujillo Soler	2–6, 2–6
Win	6–5	Mar 2006	Great Britain F3, Sunderland	Futures	Hard	(Italy) Alessandro Motti	(France) Jean-François Bachelot (Pakistan) Aisam Qureshi	6–3, 6–4
Win	7–5	Apr 2006	Spain F10, Loja	Futures	Clay	(Spain) Jordi Marse-Vidri	(Czech Republic) Dušan Karol (United Kingdom) Morgan Phillips	4–6, 7–6^{(7–4)}, ret.
Loss	7–6	May 2006	Telde, Spain	Challenger	Clay	(Spain) David Marrero	(Poland) Adam Chadaj (Sweden) Michael Ryderstedt	7–5, 3–6, [7–10]
Loss	7–7	Jul 2006	Mantova, Italy	Challenger	Clay	(Italy) Alessandro Motti	(Spain) Pablo Andújar (Spain) Marcel Granollers	3–6, 7–5, [7–10]
Loss	7–8	Aug 2006	Trani, Italy	Challenger	Clay	(Italy) Alessandro Motti	(Italy) Leonardo Azzaro (Italy) Daniele Giorgini	4–6, 6–3, [6–10]
Loss	7–9	Oct 2006	Spain F33, Córdoba	Futures	Hard	(Spain) Miguel Ángel López Jaén	(Greece) Alexandros Jakupovic (Spain) Carles Poch Gradin	6–2, 6–7^{(6–8)}, 4–6
Loss	7–10	Jun 2007	France F8, Blois	Futures	Clay	(Spain) David Marrero	(France) Adrian Mannarino (France) Josselin Ouanna	2–6, 1–6
Win	8–10	Sep 2007	Cherkassy, Ukraine	Challenger	Clay	(Spain) Santiago Ventura	(Ukraine) Sergey Bubka (Russia) Alexander Kudryavtsev	6–2, 7–6^{(7–4)}
Loss	8–11	Oct 2007	Tarragona, Spain	Challenger	Clay	(Spain) Pablo Andújar	(Spain) Marcel Granollers (Spain) Santiago Ventura	4–6, 6–7^{(3–7)}
Win	9–11	Mar 2008	Meknes, Morocco	Challenger	Clay	(Spain) Alberto Martín	(Russia) Mikhail Elgin (Russia) Yuri Schukin	6–4, 6–7^{(2–7)}, [10–6]
Win	10–11	Apr 2008	Saint Brieuc, France	Challenger	Clay	(Romania) Adrian Cruciat	(China) Yu Xinyuan (China) Zeng Shaoxuan	4–6, 6–4, [10–4]
Win	11–11	May 2008	Telde, Spain	Challenger	Clay	(Spain) Daniel Gimeno Traver	(Spain) Miguel Ángel López Jaén (Spain) José Antonio Sánchez de Luna	6–3, 6–1
Win	12–11	Aug 2008	Timişoara, Romania	Challenger	Clay	(Spain) Rubén Ramírez Hidalgo	(Romania) Adrian Cruciat (Romania) Florin Mergea	3–6, 6–4, [11–9]
Win	13–11	Sep 2008	Brașov, Romania	Challenger	Clay	(Spain) David Marrero	(Spain) Carles Poch Gradin (Spain) Pablo Santos González	6–4, 6–3
Loss	13–12	Mar 2009	Marrakech, Morocco	Challenger	Clay	(Spain) Alberto Martín	(Spain) Rubén Ramírez Hidalgo (Spain) Santiago Ventura	3–6, 6–7^{(5–7)}
Loss	13–13	May 2010	Alessandria, Italy	Challenger	Clay	(Italy) Marco Crugnola	(Croatia) Ivan Dodig (Croatia) Lovro Zovko	4–6, 4–6
Win	14–13	Jul 2010	Arad, Romania	Challenger	Clay	(Spain) Sergio Perez-Perez	(Croatia) Franko Škugor (Croatia) Ivan Zovko	6–4, 6–1
Win	15–13	Jul 2010	Poznań, Poland	Challenger	Clay	(Portugal) Rui Machado	(United States) James Cerretani (Canada) Adil Shamasdin	6–2, 6–3
Win	16–13	Sep 2010	Seville, Spain	Challenger	Clay	(Spain) Santiago Ventura	(Serbia) Nikola Ćirić (Spain) Guillermo Olaso	6–2, 7–5
Win	17–13	Oct 2010	Napoli, Italy	Challenger	Clay	(Italy) Simone Vagnozzi	(Austria) Andreas Haider-Maurer (Germany) Bastian Knittel	1–6, 7–6^{(7–5)}, [10–6]
Win	18–13	Oct 2010	Santiago, Chile	Challenger	Clay	(Spain) Rubén Ramírez Hidalgo	(Serbia) Nikola Ćirić (Montenegro) Goran Tošić	6–4, 6–2
Loss	18–14	Oct 2010	São Paulo, Brazil	Challenger	Clay	(Portugal) Rui Machado	(Brazil) Franco Ferreiro (Brazil) André Sá	6–3, 6–7^{(2–7)}, [8–10]
Win	19–14	May 2011	Zagreb, Croatia	Challenger	Clay	(Spain) Rubén Ramírez Hidalgo	(Croatia) Mate Pavić (Croatia) Franko Škugor	6–2, 7–6^{(12–10)}
Win	20–14	Sep 2011	Seville, Spain	Challenger	Clay	(Spain) Rubén Ramírez Hidalgo	(Spain) Gerard Granollers (Spain) Adrián Menéndez Maceiras	6–4, 6–7^{(4–7)}, [13–11]
Win	21–14	Mar 2012	Marrakech, Morocco	Challenger	Clay	(Slovakia) Martin Kližan	(Spain) Íñigo Cervantes (Argentina) Federico Delbonis	6–3, 1–6, [12–10]
Win	22–14	Mar 2015	Guangzhou, China	Challenger	Hard	(Kazakhstan) Aleksandr Nedovyesov	(France) Fabrice Martin (India) Purav Raja	6–2, 7–5
Win	23–14	Aug 2015	Manerbio, Italy	Challenger	Clay	(Italy) Flavio Cipolla	(Germany) Gero Kretschmer (Germany) Alexander Satschko	7–6^{(7–5)}, 3–6, [11–9]
Loss	23–15	Aug 2018	Cordenons, Italy	Challenger	Clay	(Slovakia) Andrej Martin	(Ukraine) Denys Molchanov (Slovakia) Igor Zelenay	6–3, 3–6, [9–11]

== Performance timeline ==
Key
W	F	SF	QF	#R	RR	Q#	DNQ	A	NH

(W) winner; (F) finalist; (SF) semifinalist; (QF) quarterfinalist; (#R) rounds 4, 3, 2, 1; (RR) round-robin stage; (Q#) qualification round; (DNQ) did not qualify; (A) absent; (NH) not held; (SR) strike rate (events won / competed); (W–L) win–loss record.
To avoid confusion and double counting, these charts are updated at the conclusion of a tournament or when the player's participation has ended.

=== Singles ===
Tournament	2008	2009	2010	2011	2012	2013	2014	2015	2016	2017	SR	W–L	Win%
Grand Slam tournaments
Australian Open	A	A	A	A	Q1	1R	A	Q2	1R	A	0 / 2	0–2	0%
French Open	Q1	Q2	A	Q2	1R	1R	A	Q2	1R	Q1	0 / 3	0–3	0%
Wimbledon	A	Q3	Q2	Q2	Q1	Q3	A	Q1	Q2	A	0 / 0	0–0	–
US Open	Q2	A	Q3	A	A	Q2	A	A	A	A	0 / 0	0–0	–
Win–loss	0–0	0–0	0–0	0–0	0–1	0–2	0–0	0–0	0–2	0–0	0 / 5	0–5	0%
ATP Tour Masters 1000
Indian Wells	A	A	A	Q2	A	1R	1R	A	1R	A	0 / 3	0–3	0%
Miami	A	A	A	Q2	A	A	A	A	A	A	0 / 0	0–0	–
Monte Carlo	A	A	A	A	Q2	A	A	A	A	A	0 / 0	0–0	–
Marid	A	A	2R	Q2	Q2	Q1	Q1	A	A	Q1	0 / 1	1–1	50%
Win–loss	0–0	0–0	1–1	0–0	0–0	0–1	0–1	0–0	0–1	0–0	0 / 4	1–4	20%
