= Manerbio =

Manerbio Manèrbe
- Comune
- Città di Manerbio
- Coat of arms

- Location within Italy Location within Lombardy
- Coordinates: 45°22′N 10°08′E
- Country: Italy
- Region: Lombardy
- Province: Brescia (BS)

Government
  - Mayor: Paolo Vittorielli

Area
  - Total: 27.81 km^{2} (10.74 sq mi)
- Elevation: 64 m (210 ft)

Population (2011)
  - Total: 13,195
  - Density: 474.5/km^{2} (1,229/sq mi)
- Demonym: Manerbiesi
- Time zone: UTC+1 (CET)
  - Summer (DST): UTC+2 (CEST)
- Postal code: 25025
- Dialing code: 030
- Patron saint: St. Lawrence
- Saint day: August 10
- Website: Official website

Manerbio (Brescian: Manèrbe) is a town and comune in the province of Brescia, in Lombardy, northern Italy. It received the honorary title of city with a presidential decree on May 14, 1997.

== Toponomy ==
The name Manerbio derives from Latin Minervium, due to the ancient necropolis found in its territory which was sacred to Minerva, a Roman goddess.

== History ==
The territory was inhabited since the Neolithic. During the Bronze Age, where are actually present the Madonna della Stalla and the Fornasetta farmhouses, there were two etruscan villages. Afterwards, the Celts inhabited the area. In the Manerbio countryside, has been founded some celtic phaleras from the 1st century BC (now contained in the Santa Giulia Museum, in Brescia) and 4200 dracme padane, silver money from the 2nd and the 1st century BC.

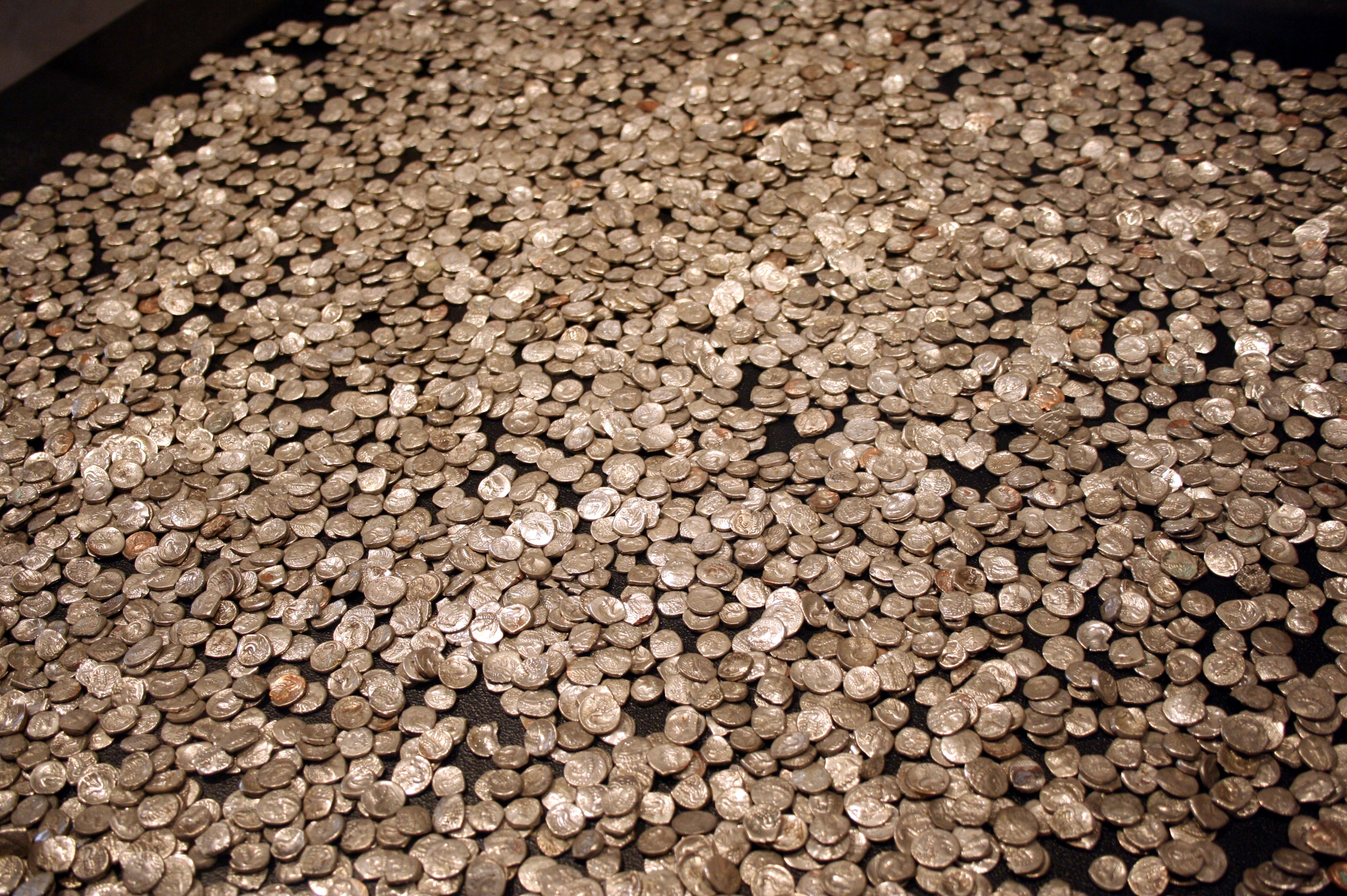
The treasure of Manerbio, a chest containing three different types of silver coins, coined on the model of silver pieces of the Greek city of Marseille between 150 and 135 BC. 2/3 of the treasure get robbed before the archaeologists' arrival and the remaining money are now located in Santa Giulia Museum.

During the Roman era, Manerbio (lat. Minervium) was crossed by the Via Brixiana, a Roman consular road which connected Cremona (lat. Cremona) to Brescia (lat. Brixia), from which Roman roads passed and then branched out towards the entire Cisalpine Gaul. Between the 1st century BC and the 3rd century AD, in Manerbio was located a necropolis sacred to Minerva. During this period, in Manerbio was also located at least five Roman villas.

During the Middle Ages, in Manerbio was located a castle which during the conflict between Guelphs and Ghibellines get besieged and destroyed by the Holy Roman Emperor Henry IV (1191) and by the King of Sicily Charles of Anjou (1271). Due to the conflict between the Duchy of Milan and the Republic of Venice, it get renewed and engaged in sieges several times.

During the Venetian rule, the town was at the head of its Quadra.

Manerbio began to be a point of reference for the neighbouring town when, due to the Battle of Solferino (1859), arose many rescue facilities which subsequently evolved in a hospital.

In 1907 started the Lanificio di Manerbio's activity, which became Marzotto in 1927. It was the biggest industrial building in the Bassa Bresciana until its closure (2003).

== Transportation ==
Manerbio has a railway station on the Brescia–Cremona line.

== Notable people ==
- Angelo Aimo, Italian retired footballer
