= Internazionali di Tennis di Manerbio – Trofeo Dimmidisì =

- 2019 Internazionali di Tennis di Manerbio – Trofeo Dimmidisì

ATP Challenger Tour
- Location: Manerbio, Italy
- Category: ATP Challenger Series
- Surface: Clay / Outdoors
- Draw: 32S/16Q/16D
- Prize money: €64,000
- Website: Website

The Internazionali di Tennis di Manerbio – Trofeo Dimmidisì was a tennis tournament held in Manerbio, Italy since 1999. The event was part of the ATP Challenger Series and was played on outdoor clay courts.

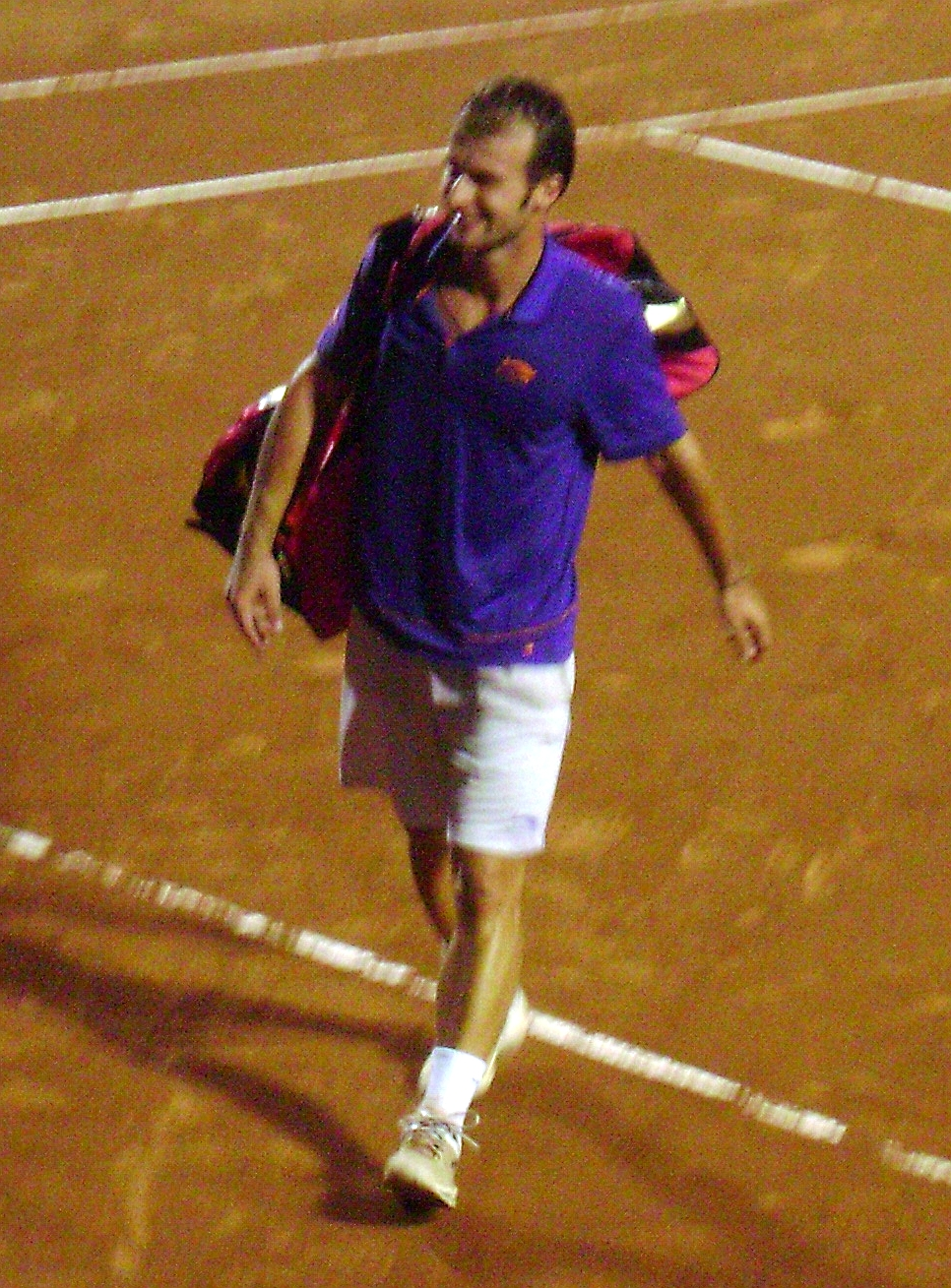
Romanian Adrian Ungur lifted the doubles trophy in 2006 and the singles one in 2011

== Past finals ==
=== Singles ===
Year	Champion	Runner-up	Score
2019	(Italy) Federico Gaio	(Italy) Paolo Lorenzi	6–3, 6–1
2017	(Spain) Roberto Carballés Baena	(Spain) Guillermo García López	6–4, 2–6, 6–2
2016	(Argentina) Leonardo Mayer	(Serbia) Filip Krajinović	7–6^{(7–3)}, 7–5
2015	(Russia) Andrey Kuznetsov	(Spain) Daniel Muñoz de la Nava	6–4, 3–6, 6–1
2011	(Romania) Adrian Ungur	(Germany) Peter Gojowczyk	4–6, 7–6^{(7–4)}, 6–2
2010	(Netherlands) Robin Haase	(Italy) Marco Crugnola	6–3, 6–2
2009	(Argentina) Federico Delbonis	(Portugal) Leonardo Tavares	6–1, 6–3
2008	(Romania) Victor Crivoi	(Belgium) Christophe Rochus	7–6, 6–2
2007	(Czech Republic) Jiří Vaněk	(France) Éric Prodon	6–0, 6–4
2006	(Sweden) Andreas Vinciguerra	(Chile) Adrián García	7–6, 6–1
2005	(Austria) Oliver Marach	(Netherlands) Melle van Gemerden	6–3, 6–2
2004	(Spain) Nicolás Almagro	(Italy) Francesco Aldi	7–6, 6–4
2003	(France) Olivier Patience	(Argentina) Martín Vassallo Argüello	3–6, 6–3, 7–6
2002	(Spain) David Ferrer	(Uzbekistan) Vadim Kutsenko	6–2, 6–0
2001	(Hungary) Attila Sávolt	(Georgia (country)) Irakli Labadze	7–5, 6–2
2000	(Italy) Stefano Tarallo	(Belgium) Kris Goossens	6–3, 6–4
1999	(Hungary) Attila Sávolt	(France) Thierry Guardiola	6–4, 7–6

=== Doubles ===
Year	Champion	Runner-up	Score
2019	(Brazil) Fabrício Neis (Brazil) Fernando Romboli	(France) Sadio Doumbia (France) Fabien Reboul	6–4, 7–6^{(7–4)}
2017	(Monaco) Romain Arneodo (France) Hugo Nys	(Russia) Mikhail Elgin (Czech Republic) Roman Jebavý	4–6, 7–6^{(7–3)}, [10–5]
2016	(Croatia) Nikola Mektić (Croatia) Antonio Šančić	(Argentina) Juan Ignacio Galarza (Argentina) Leonardo Mayer	7–5, 6–1
2015	(Italy) Flavio Cipolla (Spain) Daniel Muñoz de la Nava	(Germany) Gero Kretschmer (Germany) Alexander Satschko	7–6^{(7–5)}, 3–6, [11–9]
2011	(Germany) Dustin Brown (Croatia) Lovro Zovko	(Italy) Alessio di Mauro (Italy) Alessandro Motti	7–6^{(7–4)}, 7–5
2010	(Netherlands) Robin Haase (Netherlands) Thomas Schoorel	(Argentina) Diego Junqueira (Spain) Gabriel Trujillo-Soler	6–4, 6–4
2009	(Italy) Alessio di Mauro (Italy) Simone Vagnozzi	(Switzerland) Yves Allegro (Netherlands) Jesse Huta Galung	6–4, 3–6, [10–4]
2008	(Italy) Thomas Fabbiano (Serbia) Boris Pašanski	(Italy) Massimo Dell'Acqua (Italy) Alessio di Mauro	7–6, 7–5
2007	(Netherlands) Antal van der Duim (Netherlands) Boy Westerhof	(Portugal) Frederico Gil (Spain) Alberto Martín	7–6, 3–6, [10–8]
2006	(Romania) Gabriel Moraru (Romania) Adrian Ungur	(Poland) Michał Przysiężny (Italy) Federico Torresi	6–3, 6–3
2005	(Netherlands) Melle van Gemerden (Netherlands) Rogier Wassen	(Austria) Daniel Köllerer (Austria) Oliver Marach	6–3, 6–4
2004	(Czech Republic) Petr Luxa (Czech Republic) Martin Štěpánek	(Sweden) Johan Landsberg (Netherlands) Rogier Wassen	6–4, 6–2
2003	(Poland) Mariusz Fyrstenberg (Poland) Marcin Matkowski	(Spain) Nicolás Almagro (Spain) Roberto Menendez-Ferre	6–2, 6–4
2002	(Poland) Mariusz Fyrstenberg (Poland) Marcin Matkowski	(Australia) Anthony Ross (Socialist Federal Republic of Yugoslavia) Dušan Vemić	6–4, 7–6
2001	(Hungary) Attila Sávolt (Austria) Thomas Strengberger	(Italy) Alessandro Da Col (Italy) Andrea Stoppini	7–5, 7–5
2000	(Australia) Jordan Kerr (South Africa) Damien Roberts	(Portugal) Bernardo Mota (Slovakia) Ladislav Švarc	7–6, 6–4
1999	(Austria) Thomas Strengberger (Italy) Massimo Valeri	(Argentina) Federico Browne (Argentina) Francisco Cabello	6–3, 6–3
